= Wade Von Grawbadger =

Comic book artist

- Born: Wade von Grawbadger
- Area: Inker
- Notable works: Starman; Empress
- Awards: Eisner Award Best Penciller/Inker Team, 1995; Inkwell Awards Best Inker, 2009; Harvey Awards Best Inker, 2014; Inkwell Awards Props Award, 2015; Inkwell Awards Props Award, 2016; Inkwell Awards Favorite Inker Award, 2024

Wade von Grawbadger is a comic book artist who is known mostly for his inking work for Marvel and DC comics. He is well known for his collaborations with Stuart Immonen.

== Inker ==
=== DC Comics ===
- Alpha Centurion Special #1
- Batman Black and White vol. 5 #5
- Birds of Prey: Manhunt #1, 3, 4
- Showcase '95 #1–2
- Starman #0–10, 12–27, 29–37, 39–40, 42–45, 47, 50 (October 1994 – February 1999)

=== Marvel Comics ===
- Avengers vol. 3 #26
- Captain Marvel vol. 3 #8
- New Avengers vol. 1 #55–62; vol. 2 #1–7
- Fear Itself vol. 1 #1–7
- Secret Avengers vol. 1 #21
- Empress vol. 1 #1–7 (April – November 2016)
- Ultimate Spider-Man Vol. 19: "Death of a Goblin"

== Awards ==
- 1995: Nominated for "Best Penciller/Inker or Penciller/Inker Team" Eisner Award, with Tony Harris for Starman
- 1997:
  - Won the "Best Serialized Story" Eisner Award, with James Robinson, Tony Harris and Guy Davis for Starman #20-23: "Sand and Stars"
  - Nominated for "Best Continuing Series" Eisner Award, with James Robinson and Tony Harris for Starman
  - Nominated for "Best Penciller/Inker or Penciller/Inker Team" Eisner Award, with Tony Harris for Starman
- 2009: Won "Best Inker," Inkwell Awards
- 2011: Nominated for "Best Inker," Inkwell Awards
- 2014: Won "Best Inker," Harvey Awards
- 2015: Won "Props Award," Inkwell Awards
- 2016: Nominated "Favorite Inker," Inkwell Awards
- 2016: Nominated "Most Adaptable Inker," Inkwell Awards
- 2016: Won "Props Award," Inkwell Awards
- 2024: Won "Favorite Inker Award," Inkwell Awards
