= Kathryn Immonen =

Canadian comic book and webcomic writer (born 1971)

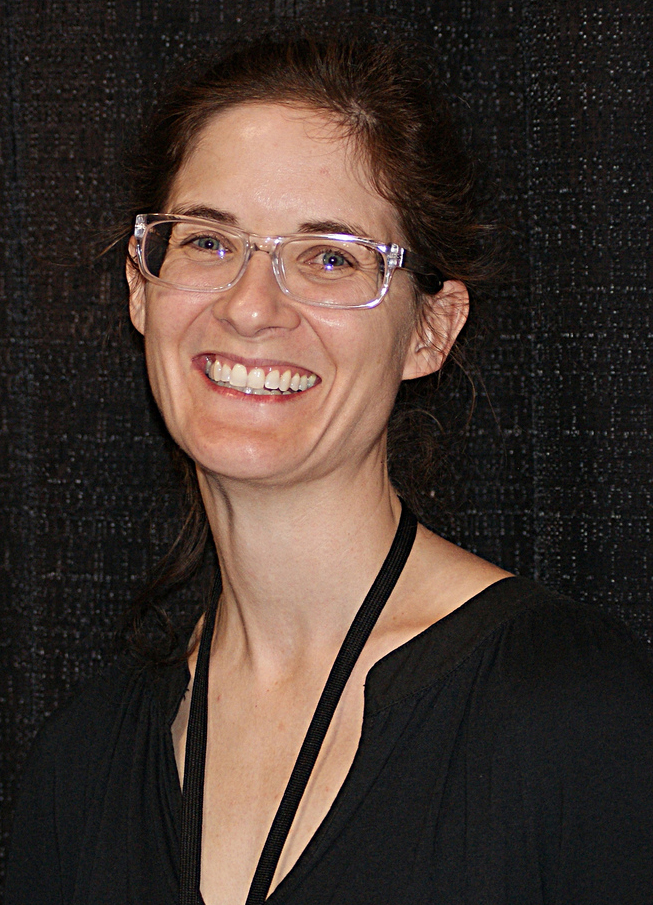
- Immonen in June 2011
- Born: Kathryn Kuder; 1971 (age 54–55)
- Area: Writer
- Notable works: Hellcat, Journey into Mystery
- Spouse: Stuart Immonen

Kathryn Immonen (/ˈɪmoʊnən/; née Kuder; born 1971) is a Canadian comic book and webcomic writer. She has written extensively for Marvel Comics since 2007, with notable works including Runaways, Journey into Mystery, and the Patsy Walker: Hellcat limited series. In 2010, she received the Kimberly Yale Award for Best New Talent for her work on Runaways.

Alongside her print work, Immonen has co-created several webcomics with her husband, artist Stuart Immonen, including Never as Bad as You Think and Moving Pictures, the latter published in print by Top Shelf Productions in 2010.

== Biography ==
In 2007 Immonen began working for Marvel Comics writing a Hellcat story, with Stuart providing the art, for the first four issues of Marvel Comics Presents. This was followed in 2008 by a five issue Patsy Walker: Hellcat mini-series, this time with artist David Lafuente.

In May 2009, Immonen became writer for Marvel Comics' series Runaways with artist Sara Pichelli.

Kathryn and Stuart Immonen have been creating various webcomics alongside their print work for Marvel Comics. Their first webcomic was Never as Bad as You Think, which was published by Boom! Studios in December 2008. The webcomic was followed by Moving Pictures, which was published in print by Top Shelf Productions in April 2010. The latter webcomic took on a darker tone than the humorous Never as Bad as You Think, taking place in 1940s France during World War II and starring a Nazi protagonist. The A.V. Club described Moving Pictures as "illustrative of what a major writing talent Immonen really is."

Immonen and artist Tonči Zonjić collaborated on Marvel's mini-series Heralds, featuring an all-female cast of main characters.

In January 2011, the four-part miniseries Wolverine and Jubilee was released, with art by Phil Noto. In 2012, Immonen took over the Journey into Mystery title with issue #646, transitioning the series' focus from Loki to Sif as the main character.

== Awards ==
- 2010 Kimberly Yale Award for Best New Talent for Runaways

== Bibliography ==
=== DC Comics ===
- The Flash vol. 2 #226 (with Stuart Immonen, credited as Kathryn Kuder November, 2005)
- Superman 80-Page Giant #1 one-shot (November, 2010)

=== Boom! Studios ===
- Never as Bad as You Think (graphic novel) (with Stuart Immonen, hc, 64 pages, ISBN 1-93450-673-7, January, 2008)

=== Marvel Comics ===
- Patsy Walker: Hellcat (limited series) (July 2008-November 2008)
  - Patsy Walker: Hellcat (tpb, 2009, ISBN 0-7851-3379-8) collects:
    - "Snowball Effect"(with David Lafuente, in #1-5, 2008)
    - "The Girl Who Could Be You!" (with Stuart Immonen, in Marvel Comics Presents vol. 2 #1-4, 2007–2008)
- Runaways vol. 3 (August 2009-November 2009)
  - Homeschooling (hc, 136 pages, 2009, ISBN 0-7851-4037-9) collects:
    - "Homeschooling" (with Sara Pichelli, in #11-14, 2009)
- Spider-Man: A Chemical Romance #1, (with Lara West, December 2009)
- Marvel Heartbreakers, one-shot, "Untitled" (with Elena Casagrande, February 2010)
- X-Men: Pixie Strikes Back (limited series) (February 2010-May 2010)
  - X-Men: Pixie Strikes Back (tpb, 96 pages, 2010, ISBN 0-7851-4676-8) collects:
    - "Pixie Strikes Back!" (with Sara Pichelli, #1-4, 2010)
- Breaking into Comics the Marvel Way! #1, "It's Not Lupus!" (with Serena Ficca, March 2010)
- Girl Comics vol. 2 #2, "Good To Be Lucky" (with Colleen Coover, May 2010)
- Heralds (limited series) (June 2010)
  - Heralds (tpb, 120 pages, 2011, ISBN 0-7851-4761-6) collects:
    - "Heaven or Las Vegas" (with Tonči Zonjić, #1, 2010)
    - "Dreams Never End" (with Tonči Zonjić and James Harren, in #2, 2010)
    - "Burning Up The Future" (with Tonči Zonjić and James Harren, in #3, 2010)
    - "Gods Will Be Gods" (with Tonči Zonjić, James Harren and Emma Ríos, in #4, 2010)
    - "Sister of Mine, Home Again" (with Tonči Zonjić and James Harren, in #5, 2010)
- Wolverine and Jubilee (limited series) (January 2011-April 2011)
  - Curse of the Mutants (hc, 120 pages, 2011, ISBN 0-7851-5775-1) collects:
    - "Cursed" (with Phil Noto, in #1-4, 2011)
- X-Men: To Serve and Protect #4, "Queen, King, Off-Suit!" (with Stuart Immonen, February 2011)
- Captain America and the First Thirteen, One-shot, "Cherchez La Femme!" (with Ramón K. Pérez, March 2011)
- Avengers Origins: Thor, One-shot (with Al Barrionuevo, November 2011)
- AVX: VS #1, "The Thing vs. Namor the Sub-Mariner", #6, "Science Battle!" (with Stuart Immonen, April, October 2012) collected in Avengers vs. X-Men: VS (tpb, 160 pages, 2013, ISBN 0-7851-6520-7)
- Avenging Spider-Man #7, "Wadjetmacallit?!" (with Stuart Immonen, May 2012)
- Journey into Mystery (November 2012-August 2013)
  - Volume 1: Stronger Than Monsters (tpb, 120 pages, 2013, ISBN 0-7851-6108-2) collects:
    - "Stronger Than Monsters" (with Valerio Schiti, in #646-650, 2012-2013)
  - Volume 2: Seeds of Destruction (tpb, 112 pages, 2013, ISBN 0-7851-8447-3) collects:
    - "A Child's Garden of Verses" (with Pepe Larraz, in #651, 2013)
    - "Seeds of Destruction" (with Valerio Schiti, in #652-655, 2013)
- A+X #5, "Epic Matryoshka" (with David LaFuente, March 2013) collected in Volume 1: =Awesome (tpb, 144 pages, 2013, ISBN 0-7851-6674-2)
- Ultron #1.AU (with Amilcar Pinna, April 2013) collected in Age of Ultron Companion (tpb, 200 pages, 2014, ISBN 0-7851-8485-6)
- Avengers Annual vol. 5 #1, "It's the most loneliest time of the year!" (with David Lafuente, December 2013) collected in Avengers: Revelations (tpb, 136 pages, 2015, ISBN 0-7851-9340-5)
- Amazing X-Men vol. 2 #7, "No Goats, No Glory" (with Paco Medina, May, 2014) collected in Volume 2: World War Wendingo (tpb, 136 pages, 2015, ISBN 0-7851-8822-3)
- Spider-Verse #2, "Anansi: A Spider in Sheep's Clothing" (with David Lafuente, January 2015) collected in Spider-Verse (hc, 648 pages, 2015, ISBN 0-7851-9035-X)
- Operation S.I.N. (five-issue limited series, with Rich Ellis, January–May 2015, collected in Operation: S.I.N.: Agent Carter (tpb, 144 pages, 2015, ISBN 0-7851-9713-3)
- Agent Carter: S.H.I.E.L.D. 50th Anniversary, one-shot (with Rich Ellis, September 2015)

=== Top Shelf Productions ===
- Moving Pictures (graphic novel) (with Stuart Immonen, tpb, 144 pages, ISBN 1-60309-049-5, June, 2010)

Preceded by Terry Moore	Runaways writer 2009	Succeeded by ND Stevenson
Preceded by Kieron Gillen	Journey into Mystery writer 2013	Succeeded by n/a
