= Stuart Immonen =

Canadian comics artist

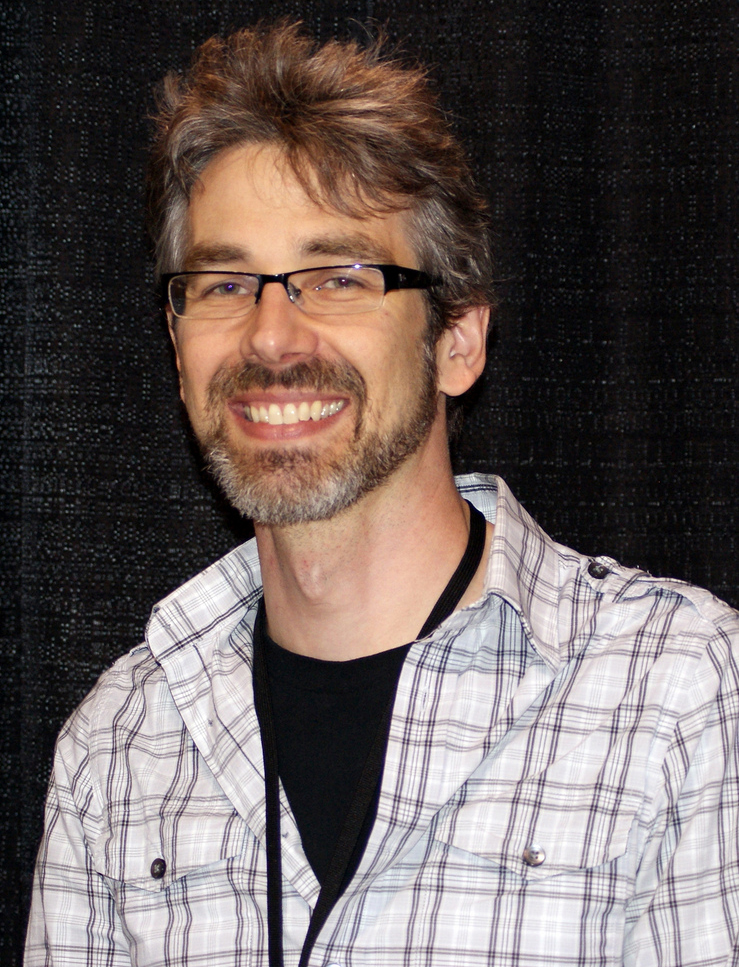
- Immonen in June 2011
- Born: 1967 (age 58–59)
- Areas: Writer, Penciller, Inker, Colourist
- Notable works: Action Comics; The Adventures of Superman; Nextwave; The Amazing Spider-Man; Ultimate X-Men; Ultimate Spider-Man; Fear Itself; Empress
- Spouse: Kathryn Immonen

Stuart Immonen (/ˈɪmoʊnən/; born 1967) is a Canadian comics artist. He is best known for his work on the Marvel Comics series Nextwave, Ultimate X-Men, The New Avengers, The Amazing Spider-Man, and Ultimate Spider-Man, the DC Comics series Action Comics and The Adventures of Superman, as well as for the original Millarworld series Empress, co-created with Mark Millar. His pencils are usually inked by Wade Von Grawbadger.

== Early life ==
Stuart Immonen grew up in a Finnish Canadian family in Canada. The first comics he read as a child were Disney comics and Harvey Comics. He would later seek out superhero comics from Marvel Comics. Sporadic distribution in the 1970s and 1980s led to the development of an eclectic sense of taste in titles, as he was often only able to find a few issues available per series. A later increase in self-publishing in Toronto spurred him to pursue a career in comics following his studies at university.

== Career ==
Immonen's first published work was the self-published series titled Playground which was released in 1988. From 1990 through 1992, he drew several issues of Rock 'N' Roll Comics for Revolutionary Comics, including issues on Prince, 2 Live Crew and Public Enemy, ZZ Top, Anthrax, and more. He worked at several smaller comic book companies before being hired by DC Comics in 1993. Since then, Immonen has drawn such high-profile characters as Superman, the Hulk, and the X-Men. His work since 2004 includes stints on the titles Ultimate Fantastic Four and Ultimate X-Men with writers Warren Ellis and Brian K. Vaughan respectively, as well as a 12-issue run pencilling Nextwave, which again paired him with Warren Ellis.

Stuart Immonen has also done work for Top Cow and Image Comics.

In 1993 and 1994, Immonen drew the Legion of Super-Heroes and with writers Mark Waid and Tom McGraw created a new Legion continuity, beginning with a retelling of the team's origin story starting in Legion of Super-Heroes vol. 4 #0 (Oct. 1994). In 1996, writer Karl Kesel and Immonen produced The Final Night limited series. That same year, Immonen was one of the many creators who contributed to the Superman: The Wedding Album one-shot wherein the title character married Lois Lane. Immonen wrote and drew part of the Superman Red/Superman Blue one-shot which launched the storyline of the same name which ran through the various Superman titles. Immonen ended his ongoing involvement with the Superman franchise with the Superman: End of the Century graphic novel in 2000 but returned to the character for the Superman: Secret Identity limited series in 2004.

In 2000, Immonen was one of the founders of Gorilla Comics, a company formed with Mark Waid, Kurt Busiek and several others. Immonen and Busiek collaborated on the Shockrockets limited series and the Superstar: As Seen on TV one-shot but the company folded after a short time.

In 2005, Immonen published 50 Reasons to Stop Sketching at Conventions, a series of fifty comics that detail why he no longer does sketches for fans. Besides self-publishing, Immonen also maintains a webcomic called Never as Bad as You Think which is co-authored by his wife, Kathryn. In 2010, Top Shelf Productions released Moving Pictures a graphic novel drawn by Immonen and co-authored by him and his wife

Immonen illustrated Marvel Comics' Ultimate Spider-Man from issue #111 to issue #133. He subsequently worked on The New Avengers from issue #55 to issue #64. He continued to be the series artist when The New Avengers relaunched during the "Heroic Age" storyline and was the regular artist for the first seven issues as well as issue #11.

In 2011, Immonen illustrated Marvel's Fear Itself miniseries which formed the core of a company-wide crossover storyline of the same name. In November 2012, he and writer Brian Michael Bendis started the series All-New X-Men.

In 2014, Immonen drew the six-issue limited series, All-New Captain America, for Marvel's Avengers NOW! relaunch.

From 2017 to 2018 he drew The Amazing Spider-Man #25 to 31, 789 to 791, 794, and 797 to 800, which included long-time series writer Dan Slott's last major storyline, titled "Go Down Swinging".

== Reception ==
In 2010, Immonen won the Joe Shuster Award for Outstanding Artist.

Doug Zawisza, reviewing the 2011 Fear Itself miniseries for Comic Book Resources, praised Immonen's art. He consistently singled out Immonen for his simple but detailed storytelling, and his ability to render varied subject matter, from Nazis to sea monsters. Zawisza called his art "incredible" and "gorgeous", and Immonen a "modern master" whose ability to convey a large amount of story in a small portion of a page Zawisza compared to that of George Pérez. Though Zawisza was not reluctant to note the occasional error, he praised specific visuals, including Immonen and Laura Martin's depiction of Yggdrasil in issue #1, as well as numerous scenes in issue #4, such as the scenes of global chaos, the Odin-Serpent framing sequence and the shots of British Columbia, which he called "chilling". Jennifer Margret Smith, reviewing the first issue for Newsarama, while praising the entire creative team, commented, "but it's Immonen who really shines", in reference to Immonen's storytelling and skill at crowd scenes. Similar reactions was garnered among reviewers at Comics Bulletin, with Danny Djeljosevic echoing Zawisza's comments regarding Immonen's ability to effectively render different subjects, from as sleepy seaside Canadian towns to superhero battles, saying, "Immonen is easily the most versatile artist in comics, who will surely go down as one of the greats with his striking layouts and dynamic, varied panel to panel storytelling. Immonen reminds me of the old-school Marvel Comics artists, who were capable of delivering strong, consistent work every month with little need for fill-ins." Alex Evans and Dean Stell of Weekly Comic Book Review thought the art and colors were vibrant and detailed, and Immonen the perfect choice for the series, though Stell thought it looked a bit rushed in issue #6, and not up to Immonen's usual standards in issue #7.

== Bibliography ==
=== DC Comics ===
- Action Comics #738–748, 750–755, 758 (1997-1999)
- Adventures of Superman #520–525, 527–535, 537–538, 541, 543–544, 546–550, 576–577 (artist), #530 (with Karl Kesel), 534, 573-577 (573-576 with Mark Millar) (577 with Jay Faerber) (writer) (1995–2000)
- The Final Night miniseries #1–4 (1996)
- Inferno miniseries #1–4 (1997)
- Legends of the DC Universe 80-Page Giant (Legion of Super-Heroes) #2 (2000)
- Legion of Super-Heroes vol. 4 #39–50, 52–56, 58–61, 0, 94, Annual #6 (full art); #94, Annual #4–5 (among other artists) (1993–1997)
- Legionnaires #10 (among other artists) (1994)
- Plunge #1–6 (2020)
- Secret Files President Luthor #1 (2001)
- Showcase '93 (Martian Manhunter) #10 (1993)
- Showcase '95 (Supergirl) #1–2 (1995)
- Showcase '96 (King Faraday) #12 (1996)
- Starman vol. 2 #14 (among other artists) (1995)
- Superman vol. 2 #87–88 (1994)
- Superman and Batman: World's Funnest (among other artists) (2001)
- Superman: End of the Century (2000)
- Superman Forever #1 (1998)
- Superman Metropolis Secret Files (among other artists) (2000)
- Superman Red/Superman Blue (among other artists) (1998)
- Superman Secret Files #2 (1999)
- Superman: Secret Identity, miniseries, #1–4 (2004)
- Superman: The Wedding Album (among other artists) (1996)
- Superman/Toyman (1994)
- Superman Villains Secret Files (1998)

=== Marvel Comics ===
- All-New Captain America #1–6 (2014–2015)
- All-New X-Men #1–5, 9–14, 16–18, 22–24, 26–29 (2012–2014)
- The Amazing Spider-Man vol. 4 #25–31, 789–791, 794, 797–800 (2017–2018)
- The Avengers vol. 3 #0, #26 (1999–2000)
- Captain America vol. 3 #50 (2002)
- Empress (2016) (Icon Comics imprint)
- Fantastic Four vol. 3 #42, 55–56, 569 (2001–2009)
- Fear Itself miniseries #1–7 (2011)
- Hero Initiative: Mike Wieringo Book ("Fantastic Four" feature) (among other artists, 2008)
- The Incredible Hulk Annual #20 (1994)
- The Incredible Hulk vol. 3 #44–49 (2002–2003)
- Marvel Comics Presents vol. 2 (Hellcat) #1–4 (2007–208)
- The Mighty Thor vol. 2 #33, 38–42, 44 (2001–2002)
- The New Avengers #55–60 (full art); #61–62 (with Daniel Acuña) (2009–2010)
- The New Avengers vol. 2 #1–7 (2010–2011)
- Nextwave: Agents of H.A.T.E. #1–12 (2006–2007)
- Secret Avengers #21 (2012)
- Spider-Man/Gen 13 (1996)
- Spider-Man Unlimited #6 (2005)
- Star Wars vol. 2 #8–12 (2015)
- Ultimate Fantastic Four #7–12, Annual #2 (2004–2006)
- Ultimate Spider-Man #111–133 (2007–2009)
- Ultimate X-Men #54–57, 59–65 (2005–2006)
- What If vol. 2 (Spider-Man) #76 (1995)
- Wonder Man Annual #1 (1992)
- X-Men vol. 2 Annual #1 (among other artists) (1992)

=== Other publishers ===
- The Beatles Experience #1–8 (Revolutionary Comics, 1991)
- Superstar: As Seen on TV! (Image Comics/Gorilla Comics, 2001)
- Shockrockets #1–6 (Image Comics/Gorilla Comics, 2000)
- Sojourn #7 (CrossGen, 2002)

Preceded by Jason Pearson	Legion of Super-Heroes vol. 4 artist 1993–1994	Succeeded by Lee Moder
Preceded by Barry Kitson	The Adventures of Superman artist 1995–1997	Succeeded by Tom Grummett
Preceded by Tom Grummett	Action Comics artist 1997–1999	Succeeded by Ron Frenz
Preceded by Randall Frenz	The Adventures of Superman writer (with Mark Millar); 1999–2000	Succeeded by J. M. DeMatteis
Preceded by Mark Bagley	Ultimate Spider-Man artist 2007–2009	Succeeded by David Lafuente
