= Spider-Man (Ultimate Marvel character) =

- Spider-Man as depicted in the Ultimate Spider-Man comic book series. Character concept art by Mark Bagley.

Publication information
- First appearance: Ultimate Spider-Man #1 (September 2000)
- Created by: Brian Michael Bendis; Mark Bagley; Bill Jemas; Ralph Macchio; Mark Millar; Bryan Hitch Based on Spider-Man by: Stan Lee; Steve Ditko

In-story information
- Alter ego: Peter Benjamin Parker
- Species: Human mutate
- Place of origin: Ultimate Marvel (Earth-1610)
- Team affiliations: Daily Bugle; Ultimates
- Partnerships: Mary Jane Watson; Kitty Pryde
- Notable aliases: Webhead, Wall-crawler, Spidey, Spider-Boy, Punk in a Onesie
- Abilities: Superhuman strength, speed, stamina, durability, agility, reflexes, coordination, and balance; Clinging to solid surfaces; Accelerated healing; Genius-level intellect; Proficient scientist; Utilizes wrist-mounted webshooters; Precognitive spider-sense; Master hand-to-hand combatant and acrobat

Spider-Man (Peter Parker) is a superhero appearing in American comic books published by Marvel Comics. He is a modernized, alternate universe counterpart of Spider-Man, a superhero first created by Stan Lee and Steve Ditko in 1962. The Ultimate version of the character is significantly younger than the original and was created for Ultimate Marvel, a line of comic books launched in 2000 that is set in a parallel universe (dubbed "Earth-1610") from the main continuity of Marvel Comics stories, which began in the 1960s.

Ultimate Spider-Man, the first and flagship title of the Ultimate line, was created by writer Brian Michael Bendis and artist Mark Bagley and debuted in September 2000, featuring the first appearance of the Ultimate version of Peter Parker. Based on the original Earth-616 incarnation of the character, this version has a similar origin story, being bitten by a genetically-mutated spider, which gives him superhuman spider-like abilities. Inspired to fight crime after the murder of his Uncle Ben, Peter creates the masked superhero persona of Spider-Man. The most significant difference between this incarnation of Peter and the original is the character's age; the Ultimate version becomes Spider-Man at the age of 16, and his superhero career spans only one year in-universe, being killed in the 2011 storyline "The Death of Spider-Man", which ended the original Ultimate Spider-Man run.

Following Peter's death, a new incarnation of Spider-Man in the Ultimate universe, Miles Morales, was introduced in Ultimate Fallout #4 (August 2011). After the events of the 2015–2016 Secret Wars storyline, Miles and his family were retconned into the history of Earth-616, while the Peter Parker of Earth-1610 was resurrected and resumed his role as Spider-Man. To differentiate him from other incarnations of the character, the Peter Parker of this universe is commonly dubbed Ultimate Spider-Man.

== Fictional character biography ==
At around the age of six, Peter Parker was orphaned after the death of his parents in a plane crash and was raised by his father's brother, Ben Parker, and his wife May. Nine years later, Peter grew to be an exceptionally bright teen and a high school genius, being particularly skilled in physics and chemistry. However, he was also an introverted outcast among his peers and was frequently bullied and tormented by Fred "Flash" Thompson and Kenny "King Kong" McFarlane. On a school field trip to the scientific corporation Oscorp, he was bitten by a genetically-mutated spider, which gave him spider-like superhuman abilities. The head of Oscorp, Norman Osborn, discovered this and experimented with the same mutagen injected within the spider's bloodstream on himself, but the experiment went awry, mutating him into a monstrous, green-coloured and hulking goblin-like creature later known as the Green Goblin.

After discovering his new abilities, Peter used his powers for personal gain, like his standard counterpart, to financially support his family as a professional wrestler and to become popular by becoming the school's top basketball player thanks to his enhanced spider-powers. However, he began to selfishly utilise his abilities and started to act irresponsibly, which adversely affected his studies and behavior, all of which worried his aunt and uncle. Peter was later fired from his job as a wrestler under suspicions that he was responsible for a recent robbery, much to his chagrin and disappointment. Later that night, as he was walking to his house, he encountered an armed robber escaping from a nearby convenience store, but refused to stop him out of spite and continued to walk home. After returning home and having a heated argument with his aunt and uncle over his failing grades and increasingly reckless nature, Peter ran away from home out of anger. After regretting his argument with his aunt and uncle, he returned home intending to apologise and reveal his spider-powers to them, but upon arriving, he saw a police car and an ambulance parked outside his house, and to his horror, he discovered that Uncle Ben had been murdered by an armed thief. Fueled with rage and a thirst for vengeance, a masked Peter hunted down his uncle's killer. After cornering the criminal within an abandoned warehouse, Peter managed to subdue him and found out, to his shock, that the killer was the same robber whom he refused to stop earlier that night. He then handed over the killer to the arriving police. Guilt-ridden, Peter vowed to follow his uncle's motto, "with great power comes great responsibility", and became the masked vigilante Spider-Man in order to utilise his spider-powers for a noble purpose and to atone for his uncle's death.

In his first year as Spider-Man, Peter encountered the Green Goblin, who later disappeared into the river below the Brooklyn Bridge, following his defeat. Peter Parker later got a job as a web designer for the Daily Bugle upon being hired by J. Jonah Jameson, the snarky and cynical editor of the Daily Bugle, who disliked Spider-Man and constantly ran defamatory smear campaigns against the vigilante. Later, he confessed his identity to his classmate, crush and childhood friend: Mary Jane Watson and they formed a close romantic relationship. Peter Parker later met Gwen Stacy, which initially put pressure on Spider-Man's current relationship with Mary Jane Watson. This issue was later resolved and the three became good friends.

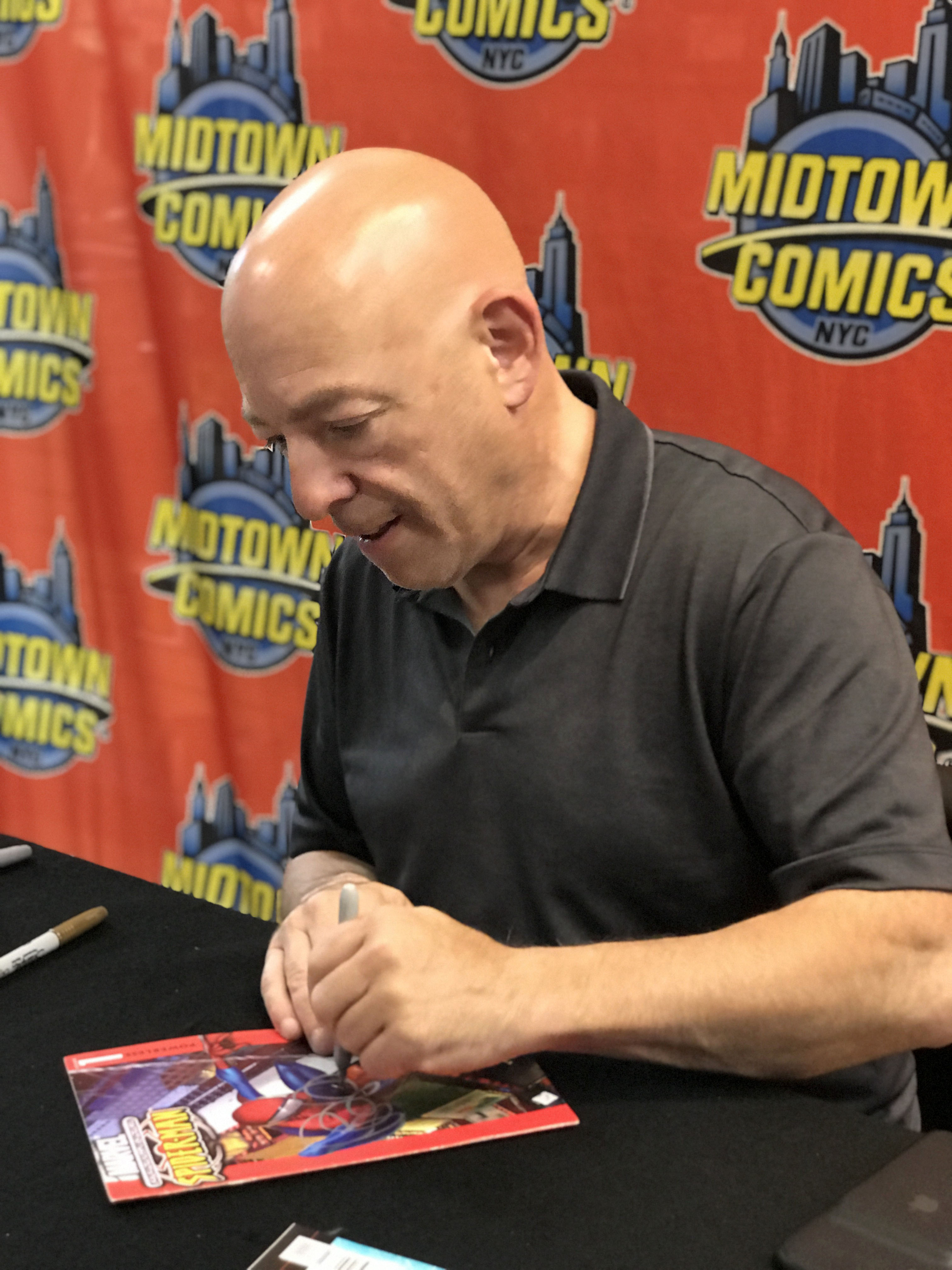
Writer Brian Michael Bendis signing a copy of Ultimate Spider-Man #1, featuring the character's first appearance, at Midtown Comics in Manhattan.

After being defeated by Spider-Man in a sudden reappearance, the Green Goblin was apprehended and incarcerated in the Triskelion alongside Doctor Octopus, Electro, Kraven the Hunter, and Sandman. They escaped from the Triskelion and formed the Ultimate Six. When the Green Goblin threatened to harm Aunt May, Spider-Man reluctantly allied with the Ultimate Six and they attacked the White House. When Captain America confirmed that Aunt May is safe, Spider-Man assisted the Ultimates in fighting the Ultimate Six.

In a later encounter with Nick Fury, Spider-Man learned that Nick Fury learned his secret identity upon finding evidence including footage of the spider that bit Peter Parker and the fact that Doctor Octopus was ranting in his cell about Peter Parker being Spider-Man.

During the "Ultimatum" storyline, Peter and those in his life survived the Ultimatum Wave caused by Magneto, with Peter helping save civilians. While Spider-Man was doing heroic acts, J. Jonah Jameson started publishing his heroic acts. While working with the Hulk, Spider-Man found the body of Daredevil, who became one of the casualties of the Ultimatum Wave. When the two of them arrived at the ruins of the Sanctum Sanctorum, Spider-Man and the Hulk found a rift open where Dormammu and different demons were emerging while Doctor Strange was possessed by Nightmare. When the Hulk caused an explosion during the fight, Spider-Man was caught in the explosion. Following the death of Magneto, the Ultimates found Spider-Man unconscious while searching for survivors.

As Spider-Man was no longer having problems with the police following the Ultimatum Wave incident, Peter Parker had to take a temporary job at the Burger Frog when the Daily Bugle was temporarily shut down during the Ultimatum Wave incident.

During "The Death of Spider-Man" storyline, Spider-Man learns that Norman Osborn has reformed the Ultimate Six with Vulture replacing Spider-Man. While searching for them following Doctor Octopus' death, Spider-Man throws himself in front of Captain America when he is targeted by Punisher and is shot in his place. After dressing the wound, Spider-Man battles the Ultimate Six, who injure him further. Before Electro can attack Spider-Man, Aunt May shoots him, causing him to discharge energy that knocks out Kraven the Hunter, Sandman, and Vulture. Spider-Man and the Green Goblin continue their fight, which leads to them mortally wounding each other.

Sometime later, under unknown circumstances, Peter awakens in an abandoned laboratory and makes his way back to New York City. To investigate if he is still dead, he and Mary Jane go to his grave, learning that somebody dug his body out of his grave. Not wanting to surprise Aunt May, Peter goes to retrieve his web-shooters from Miles Morales' apartment, only for Miles to enter his room. The two of them fight over the part of telling Aunt May, which leads to a short scuffle ending with Peter knocking Miles out and making off with his web-shooters. After the also-resurrected Green Goblin ambushes Miles in Queens, Peter comes to his aid, finally clad in his old costume. Peter's intervention to stop the Green Goblin from killing Miles surprises those who witness his return. It is later discovered that the OZ Formula that gave Peter and Norman Osborn their powers also made them seemingly immortal. Once the Green Goblin is defeated, Detective Maria Hill shoots him and immolates his body. Peter retires as Spider-Man and gives his web-shooters to Miles, as well as his blessing to uphold the Spider-Man mantle. Bidding farewell to Aunt May and Gwen, Peter and Mary Jane leave New York to find out how he came back to life.

Following the Secret Wars storyline, the Ultimate Universe is restored and Peter resumes the mantle of Spider-Man, as Miles now resides in the prime universe. After helping the Ultimates fight and detain the Green Goblin once more, Peter attends a party to welcome Kenny McFarlane home from army service.

== Other versions ==
In November 2023, writer Jonathan Hickman and artist Marco Chechetto announced they would be relaunching the Ultimate Universe under the new designation of Earth-6160. Following the events of Ultimate Invasion, the Maker created a new universe completely devoid of superheroes, having gone back in time and personally prevented the origins of several famous heroes. One such hero was Peter Parker, whose spider bite at the Oscorp Research Facility was prevented by the Maker.

Years later, following a terrorist attack that killed hundreds of civilians (most notably the Aunt May and Norman Osborn of this world), an older Peter, now married to Mary Jane Watson with two children named Richard and May, is visited by a hologram of Tony Stark, who presents Peter with the same spider the Maker had captured nearly twenty years earlier. Providing him with a synthetic stealth suit, Stark's message encourages Peter to let the spider bite him and transform him into the hero he was destined to be before the Maker took that away from him. This leads into the events of the Ultimate Spider-Man series, written by Hickman and illustrated by Chechetto, which ran from January 2024 to February 2026.

== In other media ==
=== Television ===
- Before Spider-Man: The New Animated Series became a loose continuation of Sam Raimi's 2002 Spider-Man film (see below), the series was originally going to be a direct adaptation of the Ultimate Spider-Man comics, with Brian Michael Bendis as a producer.
- Elements of Ultimate Peter Parker / Spider-Man and his universe are used in The Spectacular Spider-Man, such as Peter Parker and his friends being teenagers in high school, his personal relationship with Eddie Brock, and Spider-Man bonding with the Venom symbiote while it was kept in a secured lab. The character Kenny Kong is based on Kong from the Ultimate series, a friend of Flash Thompson.
- Elements of Ultimate Peter Parker / Spider-Man are used in an unrelated animated series of the same name, with the series' primary versions of Peter and the Green Goblin either closely resembling or incorporating design aspects of their comic book counterparts. Moreover, both the Venom and Carnage symbiotes are artificial beings created in a lab rather than aliens, with the former primarily bonding with Harry Osborn, while the latter initially bonds with Peter before becoming a self-sustaining organism requiring no host (similarly to the Ultimate version of Carnage).
  - The four-part episode "The Spider-Verse" features a variation of the Ultimate universe, in which its Peter Parker died fighting the Green Goblin. Similarly to his comic book counterpart, Peter was eventually succeeded in the role of Spider-Man by Miles Morales, who later abandons his home reality and relocates to the prime universe. Following Miles' disappearance, Gwen Stacy, who was a close friend of Peter, becomes Spider-Woman with Aunt May's help.

=== Film ===
- Elements of Ultimate Peter Parker / Spider-Man and his universe are used in Spider-Man (2002), such as Peter Parker and Harry Osborn being friends in high school and the latter protecting the former from bullies, Parker being bitten by a genetically-altered spider during a school field trip, and him letting a burglar escape due to his disappointment after participating in a wrestling exhibit.
- Elements of Ultimate Peter Parker / Spider-Man and his universe are used in The Amazing Spider-Man (2012), such as Peter Parker's angst-ridden personality, him being bitten by a genetically-altered spider at Oscorp, storming off from a conversation with his Uncle Ben about his father Richard Parker and the importance of responsibility, Peter letting a thief steal from a convenience store, and Gwen Stacy dating Peter during high school.
  - In the sequel The Amazing Spider-Man 2 (2014), Peter discovers an old recording of Richard on a computer inside an abandoned subway station lab, which explains why he had to leave Peter at a young age and his fears that his research will fall into the wrong hands. While Richard created Venom as a cure for cancer in the comics, the film depicts him creating the mutated spiders that would go on to give Peter his powers. Furthermore, Peter's friendship with Harry Osborn is also modeled after that of his and Eddie Brock Jr.'s, being childhood friends who had not seen each other in a long time and whose fathers worked together before Norman Osborn betrayed Richard.
- Elements of Ultimate Peter Parker / Spider-Man are used in Spider-Man: Homecoming (2017), such as a more youthful Peter Parker and Aunt May, Tony Stark / Iron Man serving as a mentor for Peter and developing a familial relationship with him, the presence of Aaron Davis, allusions to Miles Morales, and Peter's best friend Ned Leeds being modeled after Morales' best friend Ganke Lee.
  - In the sequel Spider-Man: Far From Home (2019), Nick Fury adopts a mentor role towards Peter like in the comics while Peter's classmate MJ, who is inspired by Mary Jane Watson, deduces his identity like her and only confirms her suspicion once he indirectly reveals it to her.
- Ultimate Peter Parker / Spider-Man appears in Spider-Man: Into the Spider-Verse (2018), voiced by Chris Pine. This version is blonde, lived into his mid-20s, married Mary Jane Watson, and licensed his likeness to merchandising to provide funds for his superheroics, allowing him to build an underground lair beneath his house to fashion tools and spare costumes. While fighting a monstrous Green Goblin and Aaron Davis / Prowler, Peter gives a flash drive containing a kill code for the Kingpin's Super-Collider to Miles Morales before being trapped under rubble and dying at Kingpin's hands. Following this, Morales is eventually galvanized into becoming the new Spider-Man.

=== Video games ===
- Ultimate Peter Parker / Spider-Man appears on the instructions booklet pages in Spider-Man 2: Enter Electro.
- Elements of Ultimate Peter Parker / Spider-Man and the comic book are used in the Spider-Man (2002) film tie-in game.
- Ultimate Peter Parker / Spider-Man appears in a self-titled video game, voiced by Sean Marquette. The game explores Peter's relationship with Eddie Brock / Venom, taking place three months after the events of the "Ultimate Venom" arc (issues #33–38) from the comics. In addition to Venom, Peter faces other antagonists such as R.H.I.N.O., Beetle, the Green Goblin, and Silver Sable, and is briefly transformed into Carnage after being injected with a makeshift sample of the Venom symbiote.
- Ultimate Peter Parker / Spider-Man appears as a playable character in Spider-Man: Battle for New York, voiced by James Arnold Taylor.
- Ultimate Peter Parker / Spider-Man appears as a playable character in Spider-Man: Toxic City.
- Ultimate Peter Parker / Spider-Man appears as a playable character in the PlayStation 3, Xbox 360, Windows and Wii versions of Spider-Man: Shattered Dimensions, voiced by Josh Keaton. Madame Web grants him his symbiote costume and uses her telepathic powers to keep it from taking over so he can retrieve fragments of the Tablet of Order and Chaos from his universe's versions of Electro, Deadpool, and Carnage. After Mysterio claims the reassembled tablet, Ultimate Spider-Man joins forces with his Amazing, Noir, and 2099 counterparts to defeat him.
- Ultimate Peter Parker / Spider-Man appears as a playable character in Ultimate Spider-Man: Total Mayhem, voiced by Andrew Chaikin.
- Elements of Ultimate Peter Parker / Spider-Man and his universe are incorporated into the Marvel's Spider-Man video game series developed by Insomniac Games. Similarly to his Ultimate counterpart, Peter was born to government agents who were killed in action during his childhood, in a publicized plane crash incident. Peter also became friends with Harry Osborn and Mary Jane Watson at a young age, though this iteration befriended them during middle school as opposed to high school or college. His scientific idol and eventual mentor, Otto Octavius, retains his affiliation with Oscorp, though in this version he was one of the corporation's co-founders rather than an employee. Peter also becomes acquainted with Miles Morales and mentors him to become the second Spider-Man after he is bitten by a genetically-altered spider recovered from Oscorp, similarly to how Peter and Miles gained their powers in the Ultimate universe.

=== Miscellaneous ===
An amalgamated incarnation of Spider-Man based on his Ultimate and mainstream counterparts appears in an interactive attraction built in Niagara Falls as part of "Marvel Superhero Adventure City". His appearance is based on the Ultimate version, but he is more experienced like his mainstream counterpart.

== Reception ==
Brian Michael Bendis' modernized re-imagining of Spider-Man has been met with a widely positive response from fans and critics, with many considering the Ultimate Marvel version of Spider-Man to be one of the best interpretations of the character. Bendis' Ultimate Spider-Man run proved extremely popular and went on to influence adaptations of Spider-Man and his mythos in television, video games, and film.

Many critics and fans have praised Ultimate Peter Parker/Spider-Man as a fresh, unique and distinctively contemporary, yet familiar and faithful twist on the classic Spider-Man mythos. The character has been called well-rounded and likable, but also vulnerable, humanly flawed and a struggling everyman teen hero, with a commendable arc that saw him grow from a selfish, angry teen to someone who understood the consequences of his own actions and learned to use his powers responsibly. Readers have also praised the depiction of Peter's struggles with leading a double life as realistic, reflecting how being a superhero would negatively affect one's personal life and relationships, similarly to Stan Lee and Steve Ditko's original Spider-Man comic book run in the 1960s.
