= Nextwave =

Fictional comic book series

- Nextwave: Agents of H.A.T.E. #11, art by Stuart Immonen. The cover parodies Marvel's Civil War.

Publication information
- Publisher: Marvel Comics
- Schedule: Monthly
- Format: Ongoing series
- Genre: Superhero
- Publication date: March 2006 – February 2007
- No. of issues: 12
- Main character(s): Dirk Anger; Elsa Bloodstone; The Captain; Monica Rambeau; Tabitha Smith; Aaron Stack

Creative team
- Created by: Warren Ellis; Stuart Immonen
- Written by: Warren Ellis
- Artist: Stuart Immonen

Collected editions
- This Is What They Want: ISBN 0-7851-2278-8
- I Kick Your Face: ISBN 0-7851-2855-7
- Ultimate Collection: ISBN 0-7851-4461-7

Nextwave: Agents of H.A.T.E. is a comedy comic book series by Warren Ellis and Stuart Immonen, published by Marvel Comics between 2006 and 2007. The simultaneously satirizes and celebrates Marvel's superhero comics. The series frequently uses flashback scenes in which existing Marvel characters such as Captain America, Ulysses Bloodstone and the Celestials act grossly out of character for comedic purposes. In an interview, Ellis said: "I took The Authority and I stripped out all the plots, logic, character and sanity. It's an absolute distillation of the superhero genre. No plot lines, characters, emotions, nothing whatsoever. It's people posing in the street for no good reason. It is people getting kicked, and then exploding. It is a pure comic book, and I will fight anyone who says otherwise. And afterwards, they will explode." The series is also notable for featuring the first appearance of the modern redheaded version of Elsa Bloodstone, redesigning and recharacterising the blonde character concept by that name from the Bloodstone miniseries.

== Concept ==
The series was written exclusively in two-issue story arcs. Each issue began with a humorous FAQ, in which questions were answered with enthusiastic marketing copy that veers into the strange or disturbing. It was also used to answer questions posed by uninformed readers.

The series features a collection of minor Marvel superheroes: monster hunter Elsa Bloodstone; Monica Rambeau, the former Captain Marvel; Tabitha Smith, formerly of X-Force; Aaron Stack, the Machine Man; and new character the Captain, previously called Captain ☠☠☠☠ (the obscured words being so horrible that Captain America allegedly "beat seven shades of it out of [him]" and left him in a dumpster with a bar of soap in his mouth). These individuals are assembled by H.A.T.E., the Highest Anti-Terrorism Effort, to fight Unusual Weapons of Mass Destruction (U.W.M.D.s). The Nextwave team learns that H.A.T.E. is funded by the Beyond Corporation, an organization formerly known as terrorist group S.I.L.E.N.T. As a result, the heroes leave H.A.T.E., stealing a vehicle called the Shockwave Rider. They destroy the U.W.M.D.s that the Beyond Corporation and H.A.T.E. have hidden around the United States, while being pursued by H.A.T.E. Director Dirk Anger, a parody of Nick Fury. The U.W.M.D.s include Fin Fang Foom, Broccoli Men, Ultra Samurai, and the Mindless Ones. Using the Shockwave Rider as a mobile base of operations (the vehicle is larger on the inside than out, implied to be the TARDIS of Doctor Who), Nextwave is able to rapidly mount missions in widely separated locations including central Illinois, Wyoming, North Dakota, and Nevada.

== Publication history ==
Nextwave: Agents of H.A.T.E. debuted in 2006 and was cancelled after issue #12, which was published in February 2007. The run of the series was written by Warren Ellis, drawn by Stuart Immonen and colored by Dave McCaig. Warren Ellis (on his website) stated in October 2006 that he had initially planned to write the series for twelve issues, then pass it off to another writer. However the initial plan was changed and the series was placed on hiatus until Ellis should choose to return. According to Ellis, this was at least partly because monthly sales could not justify keeping artist Stuart Immonen on the project at his then current pay rate. Ellis has stated that "there will be more Nextwave to come, presented as a sequence of limited series".

Starting with issue #3, Marvel changed the series title from Nextwave to Nextwave: Agents of H.A.T.E. Artist Stuart Immonen said that the title change was due to trademark issues.

A variant edition of issue #5, called the "Crayon Butchery Variant", was printed in black and white on newsprint. Marvel (through the website Comic Book Resources) encouraged readers to color the issue with crayons and enter the results, for a chance to win original artwork from the issue. The winner was announced in the letter column of the tenth issue. Issue #11 contains a series of splash pages that Warren Ellis and Stuart Immonen devised so that in order to get the full impact of the scene, a reader might have to purchase six copies. On the last of the pages, a caption reads: "Nextwave: Blatantly wasting your money since 2006".

A theme song was created by series editor Nick Lowe and his brother Matt, by their band Thunder Thighs. It was advertised on their Myspace page and lyrics printed in the "Director's Cut" edition of the first issue. The tabs and lyrics are also in the Volume 1 hardcover collected edition.

=== Awards ===
The Young Adult Library Services Association (YALSA) released their Best of 2007 lists and Nextwave: Agents of H.A.T.E. was named among the 2007 Top Ten Great Graphic Novels for Teens. Nextwave writer Warren Ellis was happy to learn of the title's recognition by YALSA, saying that he did it all for the children. In keeping with the off-beat humor of his book, Ellis added: "It is good to know that the young people of today are ready and waiting for me to form a Church."

The series also won three Eagle Awards for Favourite New Comicbook, Favourite Comics Story Published During 2006 (for issues #1–6), and Favourite Comics Villain (for Dirk Anger).

== Continuity ==
In a 2005 interview, writer Warren Ellis commented on his Nextwave: Agents of H.A.T.E. stories: "I think it has to be a self contained universe. It takes from Marvel history, but I wouldn't necessarily want to drag mainstream Marvel into it for fear of what I would do to it." In 2006, Marvel Editor-in-Chief Joe Quesada said that "for the time being" Nextwave was to be considered set in a universe separate from the main Marvel continuity. In contradiction to these earlier statements, Marvel publications such as Official Handbook of the Marvel Universe and Civil War: Battle Damage Report seemed to portray Nextwave's activities as occurring in the mainstream Marvel continuity. To further complicate matters, Nextwave's entry in Civil War: Battle Damage Report states: "Recent intelligence suggests some or all Nextwave members unknowingly had their memories and/or personalities altered by their new employers (H.A.T.E.)." In Captain America and the Mighty Avengers, it is definitively stated that Nextwave happened, with the Beyond Corporation, now revealed to be members of The Beyonders returning, and tauntingly telling Luke Cage and Jessica Jones to ask Monica about "Beyond", making her realize those events were, in fact, real, and reverting to her Nextwave outfit.

=== Other versions ===
A version of the team appears in the Marvel Zombies universe in Marvel Zombies vs. The Army of Darkness where they engage in battle with the infected superheroes. They are killed off-panel by the infected Power Pack.

== Collected editions ==
The series has been collected into a number of volumes:

- Nextwave: Agents of H.A.T.E. Volume 1 – This Is What They Want (2006), collects issues #1–6
  - Hardcover edition: ISBN 0-7851-2278-8
  - Softcover edition: ISBN 0-7851-1909-4
- Nextwave: Agents of H.A.T.E. Volume 2 – I Kick Your Face (2007), collects issues #7–12
  - Hardcover edition: ISBN 0-7851-2855-7
  - Softcover edition: ISBN 0-7851-1910-8

In March 2010, all twelve issues were collected into a paperback Ultimate Collection (ISBN 0-7851-4461-7).

=== Merchandise ===
The entire Nextwave team was represented in HeroClix form in the Giant Size X-Men (GSX) set. The team of five figures equals an even 500 points.

== The Captain ==
Captain

Publication information
- Publisher: Marvel Comics
- First appearance: Nextwave #1 (January 2006)
- Created by: Warren Ellis; Stuart Immonen

In-story information
- Team affiliations: H.A.T.E. Nextwave
- Notable aliases: Captain ☠☠☠☠, Captain Power, Captain Ron, Captain L. Ron, Captain Universe, Captain Ultra, Captain Avenger, Captain Avalon, Captain Marvel, Captain Kerosene
- Abilities: Superhuman strength and endurance Flight; Enhanced sight

The Captain (formerly Captain ☠☠☠☠, with the crosses denoting censorship of an expletive) is a fictional character appearing in American comic books published by Marvel Comics. He is a satiric superhero appearing in the book Nextwave. He was created by Warren Ellis and Stuart Immonen and first appeared in Nextwave #1 (January 2006).

In 2006, Marvel editor-in-chief Joe Quesada stated that Nextwave's setting was in a universe separate from the main Marvel continuity. However, issues of Official Handbook of the Marvel Universe, as well as Civil War: Battle Damage Report, place Nextwave's activities in mainstream continuity.

According to Warren Ellis's series proposal (within Volume 1's collection of stories), he stated that the Captain was pretty much every pointless character who utilized "Captain" in his codename.

=== Nextwave ===
Little is known about the Captain's past before he joined H.A.T.E., the organization which assembled Nextwave. One flashback shows that when he was a child, his mother hanged his favorite teddy bear, Special Bear; due to this, he dislikes teddy bears even in adulthood. As with all of the flashbacks shown in the series, the accuracy of this memory is suspect, as Civil War: Battle Damage Report states that members of Nextwave may have had memories altered by the Beyond Corporation. He claims to be "from ☠☠☠☠ Brooklyn".

The Captain gained his powers from "the Heartstar of the space between the galaxies", also referred to as the "Messianic Siddhe-complex", which was bestowed upon him by a pair of small, green, altruistic extraterrestrials named Spa-Fon and Squa-Tront in order to make Brooklyn a better place. As the Captain was incredibly drunk at the time, it is unknown if he remembers this event exactly, as he immediately attacked both aliens, believing them to be gold-bearing leprechauns.

By his own admission, he used to go by Captain ☠☠☠☠, a moniker so offensive that, when he met Captain America, the Avenger beat him severely and left him unconscious in a dumpster with a bar of soap in his mouth. The Captain used a lot of codenames as well, all of them starting with 'Captain', and had to abandon them all because someone else was already using them. In Nextwave #7 he mentions that he had to pay a "marine-looking melon farmer" to even use his current codename.

The Captain continues to use his codename in the Nextwave group while the other members have dropped them; according to Aaron Stack, this is due to an inability to remember his real name. According to the official theme song of the comic, in tone with the satirical quality of the stories, he no longer has a name, with "The Captain" serving both as a moniker and as an impromptu first name.

Similar to the rest of Nextwave, the Captain dresses in civilian clothes—sneakers, camouflage pants, a trenchcoat, and a white T-shirt with a black star which resembles the Heartstar—despite becoming a superhero "for the mask", as he stated in issue #1.

The Captain is extremely cynical, foul-mouthed, and hard-drinking. His age is as yet undetermined, but he has said his mother conceived him while listening to Roxy Music's 1982 album Avalon.

A text box in one issue states that, despite his name, he is not actually the captain of anything.

=== Initiative ===
The Captain and other Nextwave members appear on the solicited cover to Avengers: The Initiative.

=== Civil War II ===
The Captain resurfaces in the 2016 Civil War II storyline, reduced to possible homelessness and whiling away his time in New York City's dive bars. He is spurred back into action when Nova's battle with the forces of Mole Monster causes his beer to spill, an innocuous occurrence that the Captain interprets as an epiphany-inducing "metaphor for something".
