= Spider-Man: Toxic City =

2009 video game

- Developer(s): Gameloft
- Publisher(s): Gameloft
- Producer(s): Jerome Levy; Eric Chort
- Designer(s): Stephane Varrault; Mei Dong Sheng
- Programmer(s): Brice Ramard
- Artist(s): Arthur Hugot; Mikael Robert
- Composer(s): Nicola Archambault
- Platform(s): BlackBerry, Windows Phone, Java ME
- Release: BlackBerry: WW: June 2009; Windows Phone: WW: November 27, 2009
- Genre(s): Action
- Mode(s): Single-player

Spider-Man: Toxic City is a 2009 action game developed and published by Gameloft, and is based on the Ultimate Spider-Man comics set within the Ultimate universe. It was designed and released for BlackBerry, Windows Phone and Java ME phones.

== Gameplay ==
There are a total of 13 missions in which there are 4 bonus stages. In the game there are many collectibles, such as golden spiders (to increase power, health, endurance meter) and golden heart (to fill health). In addition there are comic collections during the gameplay. There is also a suit selection for Spider-Man, in which he can play with his original as well as his Black Suit.

== Plot ==
At Oscorp, the Green Goblin is holding hostages going through a genetic procedure inside a lab, and claims they "should be proud to go through the next level of evolution" as the group mutates into creatures called Goblonites. Spider-Man then sees a squad of police cars heading towards a commotion nearby and starts to fight his way through gangsters and complains about how late he is for his date with Mary Jane Watson until he encounters Shocker, who is angry that in all the chaos Spider-Man had to run into him. After Shocker is defeated, Spider-Man asks him what's all the commotion about and Shocker responds saying that he took advantage of someone else's chaos. After fighting some more gangsters, he runs into Rhino, and defeats him. When Peter gets out the school, he talks to MJ, who is angry at him and walks away with Peter wondering what will he do. He suddenly sees Goblonites and starts fighting his way through until he sees the Green Goblin. Peter asks him what is he doing out of prison, and the Green Goblin answers he should be asking who broke out with him and refers to the Goblonites as "the newest members of the family". Peter teases him about their appearance and the Green Goblin throws Peter through the school wall in which he follows and tells Peter this is his last chance to join him and he jumps away and Peter starts chasing him fighting his way through the goblonites. When Peter runs into the Goblin again, he throws him back into the school through the ceiling. Peter continues fighting his way through the Goblonites until he reaches the Green Goblin and starts fighting him. The Green Goblin confirms that the Goblonites are the first of his creations of super humans. Peter classifies them as sub-human rather than super human and continues to fight the Green Goblin. Before Peter can finish off the Green Goblin, he runs away but not before telling Peter that he can't run away from his destiny.

== Reception ==
Reception

Review scores
Publication	Score
Slide to Play	7/10 (Windows Phone)
Pocket Gamer	4/10 (Java ME)

Spider-Man: Toxic City received mixed reviews from critics. Pocket Gamer gave the Java ME version of Toxic City an overall score of 4 out of 10, calling it a "rather repetitive button-masher", further stating that its combat is "basic" and the gameplay is "shallow and uninvolving". Pocket Gamer praised the game's graphics, calling them "impressive" due to the "highly detailed" stages and "fluid" animation, but noted that they don't make up for the game's gameplay issues.

Slide to Play gave the Windows Phone version of the game an overall score of 7 out of 10, calling it a "very good" sidescroller with varied level design and visuals, but criticized the game's "clunky" controls that impede gameplay, noting that they make some platforming segments "a lot less fun" as a result.
