= Kenny McFarlane =

Kenny "Kong" McFarlane
- Kenny "Kong" McFarlane as depicted in Ultimate Spider-Man #15 (January 2002). Art by Mark Bagley.

Publication information
- Publisher: Marvel Comics
- First appearance: Ultimate Spider-Man #1 (September 2000)
- Created by: Brian Michael Bendis (writer); Mark Bagley (artist)

In-story information
- Full name: Kenneth McFarlane
- Supporting character of: Spider-Man
- Notable aliases: Kong, King Kong

Kenneth "Kong" McFarlane (also known as King Kong) is a fictional character appearing in American comic books published by Marvel Comics. Created by Brian Michael Bendis and Mark Bagley, the character appears in the pages of Ultimate Spider-Man. Kenny McFarlane is one of the few characters not based on a counterpart from Marvel's main continuity, being an original Ultimate Marvel invention to the comics, and is indirectly based on Bendis himself. However, his personality is based on Flash Thompson of the main continuity during his high school years. Several versions of the character are later introduced in the main continuity.

In Ultimate Spider-Man, despite his apparent lack of intelligence based on being a stereotypical high school bully, Kenny is actually a perceptive teenager and able to deduce Spider-Man's secret identity but keeps this knowledge to himself; he respects the hero's wishes of secrecy and covertly helps him maintaining it. Knowing that Peter Parker is Spider-Man inspires Kenny to be a better person and occasionally help others in need.

== Fictional character biography ==
Kenny McFarlane is a student of Midtown High School and friend of Flash Thompson who often works with him to bully Peter Parker. However, he is significantly nicer without Flash's influence.

Kenny is present when Peter is bitten by the radioactive spider, and later deduces his secret identity as Spider-Man. He later enters a relationship with Kitty Pryde after defending her from Flash's discrimination.

Following the destruction and restoration of Earth-1610 in Secret Wars, Kenny joins the U.S. army after graduating.

== Other versions ==
=== Marvel Universe ===
==== Kenny "King" Kong ====
Kenny "King" Kong made his debut in the mainstream Marvel Universe in Starbrand & Nightmask #1 (February 2016), and was created by writer Greg Weisman and artist Dominike Stanton. This version, designed after and based on the adaptation of the character in the animated series The Spectacular Spider-Man (2008–2009), is an Asian-American student at Empire State University who works at a barista and is in a relationship with his coworker and fellow student Shelley Conklin.

==== Kenny McFarlane Jr. ====
Kenny McFarlane's son, Kenny McFarlane Jr., appears in Venom vol 4 #35 (June 2021), and was created by Donny Cates and Mark Bagley.

== Character's name ==
Writer Brian Michael Bendis did not name Kenny McFarlane consistently during his run on Ultimate Spider-Man. In the first scenes, he is called by his nickname King Kong or simply Kong or even his real name. His last name was hinted to be Harlan in the first issue and his mother called him Clifford in issue #15. While in Ultimate Marvel Team-Up around the same time, in a story also written by Brian Michael Bendis, a teacher calls him Kenny. As a result of this information, in the "Official Handbook of the Ultimate Marvel Universe", he was referred to as "Kong Harlan, a.k.a. Clifford Kenneth Harlan". However, in issue Ultimate Spider-Man #82, his name is finally revealed to be "Kenny McFarlane". He now refers to himself as Kenny McFarlane, and in an interview with Bendis, it is confirmed that this is his real name.

== In other media ==
Kenny Kong as depicted in The Spectacular Spider-Man.

- A character based on Kenny McFarlane named Kenny Kong appears in The Spectacular Spider-Man, voiced by Andrew Kishino. He is an Asian-American member of the Midtown High football team.
- Kenny McFarlane makes a non-speaking cameo appearance in Ultimate Spider-Man.
