= Moving Pictures (webcomic) =

- Ila Gardner in Moving Pictures
- Author: Kathryn Immonen
- Illustrator: Stuart Immonen
- Current status/schedule: Completed
- Publisher: Top Shelf Productions

Moving Pictures is a late 2000s webcomic written by Kathryn Immonen and illustrated by Stuart Immonen. Set in occupied France in World War II, the webcomic presents the complex relationship of Nazi officer Rolf Hauptman and Canadian museum curator Ila Gardner. The historical setting of Moving Pictures serves purely to frame the "fucked up" relationship between its two protagonists.

The webcomic was published by Top Shelf Productions in 2010 in the form of a graphic novel, which was praised by critics for its sharp black and white artstyle and dark storytelling.

== Synopsis ==
"The history is just a backdrop to tell a fucked up love story that's about how we assign value to things and people, how we behave when not everyone is playing by the same rules."

— Kathryn Immonen

The plot of Moving Pictures is set in Paris during its German occupation in World War II, following the officer of the fictional "German Military Art Commission", Rolf Hauptman. The story is presented by Hauptman interrogating museum curator Ila Gardner about certain missing artworks. As Hauptman's questions persist, Gardner's memories reveal that the relationship between the two characters is more complex than simply that of "interrogator and suspect".

During the interrogation, Gardner recalls how she traveled from Canada to France because of her love for art. After the German occupation of the country, Gardner found herself working both with and against German forces in order to preserve as much artwork as she can. As the character was assigned to relocate the museum's entire collection, Gardner had to cooperate with Hauptman, who she both hates and finds an inexplicable affection to. Writing for Bleeding Cool, Greg Baldino described this relation as an "affair fueled by passions and paradoxes."

== Creation ==
=== Conception ===
Moving Pictures is the second webcomic created by Kathryn and Stuart Immonen, who both had experience creating comic books together for Marvel Comics. The pair's first webcomic, Never as Bad as You Think, is a comedic slapstick comic strip with little to no story. Greg Burgas of Comic Book Resources noted the difference in tone between the Never as Bad as You Think and Moving Pictures, the latter taking on a much darker subject matter and more complex story. The two webcomics share a "sharp" artstyle, with characters being rendered as "skinny and pointy".

Kathryn Immonen came with the idea to create Moving Pictures after reading Janet Flanner's reports from Paris, which Flanner sent to The New Yorker during World War II. One of these reports was a quip in which she "thanked" the Nazis for "letting the Louvre staff get some good dusting and mopping in", a satirical piece Immonen described as "pretty irresistible". It took some time before the Immonens could find the opportunity to work on the webcomic, as Stuart still had a lot of stories from Marvel to work on.

=== Development ===
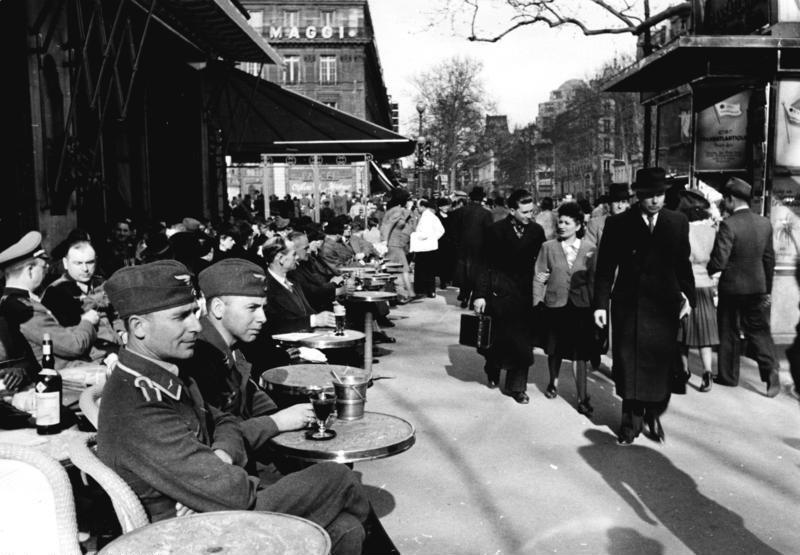
Stuart Immonen frequently referred to photographs of 1940s France while illustrating Moving Pictures.

Though it was initially written as a one-act play, Kathryn and Stuart Immonen started uploading Moving Pictures as a webcomic in the late 2000s because of "scheduling mechanics", allowing them to create the comic in a timely fashion through weekly deadlines. The Immonens had a small buffer of pages to upload in case they couldn't make a deadline, and the two shared "post-script duties" such as Photoshop processing, lettering, making the pages ready for upload, and posting itself. Stuart described this sharing of work as "easier than the conventional writer/artist relationship". The script of Moving Pictures wasn't broken down into pages or panels, which allowed the Immonens to expand or contract the narrative in a more freeform style.

The Immonen's researched the setting of the story, but kept the setting somewhat vague, blanking newspapers and documents shown in the webcomic and leaving out the names of historical figures. Stuart argued that he doesn't mean to romanticize the war period and only means to use the setting as a backdrop for what Kathryn describes as a "fucked up love story." The tone of Moving Pictures was inspired by Au Passage du Pourquoi-Pas by Anne Baraou and Stanislas Barthélémy, as well as works by Michel Rabagliati. Stuart said that he was mostly inspired by photographs of the time and place itself, expressing that he "tried to render the period with respect."

A print publication by Top Shelf Productions was planned in May 2009, a publisher suggested to the Immonens by Brian Wood. The graphic novel was published a year later than initially planned, in June 2010.

== Reception ==
After the print release of Moving Pictures in June 2010, the comic got the attention of various publications. Baldino of Bleeding Cool reacted positively to the black and white artstyle, saying that the simplicity of the lines and shapes were reminiscent to the works of Ivan Brunetti and Andi Watson. Bladino also lauded the "nuances of gestures and expression, the interplay of body language and spatial relationships," and said that Kathryn Immonen's storytelling is of high quality. Publishers Weekly similarly praised the simplistic artstyle for its sharp contrasts. Burgas of Comic Book Resources praised the comic's "beautiful" lettering and striking use of silhouette.

Jason Michelitsch of ComicsAlliance described Ila Gardner as a "ballsy choice as a main character", as he said that the entire book hinges on the character. Characterizing Gardner as a character who "works at being unlikeable, ... cold and nihilist", Michelitch asserted that all other characters in the graphic novel are defined in terms of their relationship to the curator. Partly because of this, Michelitch described the sensation of reading Moving Pictures as that of "creeping, suffocating emptiness", with powerful use of negative space and obscuring faces in shadow, "literally removing the humanity". The A.V. Club praised Gardner's character and difficult storytelling as "powerful experimentalism ... illustrative of what a major writing talent Kathryn Immonen really is," and they praised Stuart's artwork for its "skillful use of light and shadow."

The Moving Pictures graphic novel was nominated for a Doug Wright Award in 2011 for the "Best Book" category. Stuart Immonen was nominated for a Stumptown Award that same year, for the category "Best Artist".
