= Original Sin (comics) =

2014 Marvel comic book series

- Cover to Original Sin #1 (April 2014). Art by Julián Totino.
- Publisher: Marvel Comics
- Publication date: April – September 2014
- Genre: Superhero; Crossover
- Main character(s): Avengers; Winter Soldier; Gamora; Moon Knight; Thing; Doctor Strange; Emma Frost; Ant-Man; Black Panther; The Punisher; Daredevil; Nova; Nick Fury; Mindless Ones; Doctor Midas; Exterminatrix

Creative team
- Writer: Jason Aaron
- Artist: Mike Deodato
- Colorist: Frank Martin

"Original Sin" is a 2014 comic book storyline published by Marvel Comics. The story features Nick Fury and the Avengers investigating the murder of Uatu the Watcher, only to suffer trauma from what they see in his eyes. They also come into conflict with a group of misled self-appointed investigators led by Black Panther and Punisher.

== Publication history ==
Writer Jason Aaron and Mike Deodato conceived the "Original Sin" storyline as one in which different heroes worked together in different investigations to find out who murdered Uatu the Watcher.

== Main plot ==
Sam Alexander, while training with Uatu the Watcher at his moon base, stumbles across Uatu's weapons storage. Sam asks about it and Uatu tells him the origin story of the Watchers. Sam learns that Uatu's father was the Watcher who originally gave nuclear technology to the Prosilicans, with Uatu's search of parallel universes being motivated by the desire to find the one world where his father's act of charity was proved to be the right thing to do. Uatu reveals that Sam's missing father, Jesse Alexander, is alive.

Later on the Moon, Uatu realizes something big is going to happen to him. Though scared, he confronts his soon-to-be-killer and tells him "I see you." With that, his base explodes. On Earth, Captain America, Wolverine, Black Widow, and Nick Fury are contacted by a panicked Thor. The group journeys to the Moon, where they discover Uatu dead, killed by gunshots to the head, his eyes missing. They deduce that the killer was a professional, and that Uatu's equipment was stolen.

Fury warns that given the few people who knew of Uatu's existence and had the ability to murder him, his killer could be one of their allies, but Captain America insists on discovering the truth. In Wakanda, a shadowy source whose face is not revealed gives Black Panther various possible leads. The source tells Panther that while the trail goes in different directions, they all lead back to one: the unseen "original sin". Three teams are formed to investigate the leads: Emma Frost, Scott Lang and Black Panther go to the center of the Earth; Moon Knight, Winter Soldier, and Gamora head into deep space; and Doctor Strange and Punisher travel to another dimension. On the Moon, Black Widow removes fragments from Uatu's skull that Captain America believes may be bullet fragments. He and Fury are alerted to a battle between a Mindless One and the Thing in New York. Spider-Man arrives and observes that the creature has telepathic abilities, which the Mindless Ones typically do not have. The Mindless One screams in agony over the things he has seen and done, and kills himself with the Ultimate Nullifier. When Fury and the Avengers arrive, Fury declares the battle zone a crime scene and assumes authority over it. Elsewhere, Orb and Exterminatrix realize that they and the other Mindless Ones are evolving. Orb wants to know what is inside one of Uatu's eyes, which they have in their possession.

Panther, Frost, and Ant-Man discover a graveyard of giant monsters that Panther believes were killed by the same person who murdered Uatu. Ant-Man examines one of the creatures, and finds evidence. Meanwhile, Doctor Strange and Punisher's investigation takes them to an extradimensional realm where they discover a giant dead monster, out of whose corpse the Punisher extracts a giant, green, glowing bullet. The Avengers and their allies trace the evolved Mindless One back to Orb and Exterminatrix, and a battle ensues between the two forces, during which Orb activates Uatu's eye in order to reveal its secrets.

Ant-Man reveals that the glowing green bullets are gamma-irradiated, leading Panther to conclude that the murderer has been killing large creatures for some time, and that Uatu was murdered because he observed something that compromised the murderer's activities. The Orb reveals to Fury that he was hired by Doctor Midas to break into Uatu's home, but that he did not commit the murder. Moon Knight, Gamora and Winter Soldier find the murdered hulk of a sentient planetoid, but their actions are observed by Panther's shadowy source, who tells a subordinate that they will need more gamma bullets. Winter Soldier maroons his comrades there while he teleports to another location and kills Fury, decapitating him.

Doctor Strange deduces that the Panther's source, who sent them on the various trails the Avengers have been following, is the murderer himself. They find Wolverine and the Hulk with Fury's corpse at Avengers Tower, and after a brief confrontation, take the corpse and the Orb. Panther traces the signal his source used to contact him to a satellite in orbit around the Earth, where Fury's corpse is found, and where all three teams converge to confront one another. Winter Soldier reveals that the Fury he killed was a Life Model Decoy (LMD). They are then confronted by Panther's shadowy source, a real, elderly Fury, and several of his LMDs.

Fury tells the heroes an account from 1958, when as a member of U.S. Army Intelligence, he fought off an invasion of alien Tribellians in Kansas. It was in that battle that he witnessed the heroic death of Woodrow McCord, who defeated the aliens before being fatally injured. When McCord's partner Howard Stark arrived on the scene, he recruited Fury to continue McCord's work as defender of Earth, single-handedly neutralizing any potential threat to the planet. Over the decades, Fury secretly fought superhuman threats, from aliens to subterranean monsters and extra-dimensional beings, as a side job to his work with the Army, the CIA, and later, S.H.I.E.L.D., one that no one at either organization ever knew about. The corpses discovered by the superhero investigators were threats that Fury had neutralized. Orb says there is more Fury has not revealed, but Orb collapses, due to his body's absorption of what he stole from Uatu.

Fury reveals that he has rapidly grown elderly and is dying because the Infinity Formula in his body has been depleted. He explains that he chose each of the heroes assembled so that one of them can replace him. His refusal to answer Panther's demand for an explanation of what happened to Uatu leads to a battle between the heroes and the LMDs, during which Fury activates Uatu's eyes. The Avengers try to stop Nick Fury but fail. Fury whispers something into Thor's ear during their fight and Thor becomes incapable of picking up his hammer. At the same time, Orb escapes Fury's custody just as Doctor Midas arrives.

Fury confronts Doctor Midas, who is trying to acquire more power by attacking the citadel. Nick fought Midas' Mindless Ones during which fight one of the Watcher's eyes was taken from him by the Orb and was almost defeated, until the heroes chosen by Fury got to him, and also managed to get the confession from Fury that he was the one who had killed Uatu and taken the second eye. Fury had done this because when he went to aid Uatu after being attacked and robbed by the Orb and Midas, the Watcher refused to tell him the names of the culprits, as it was against the Watchers' oath of non-interference. Fury had realized the eyes were where Uatu kept what he had seen, and that the only way to know the identities of the criminals before they did something with Uatu's armory was to kill Uatu and take his remaining eye. Fury then confronted Midas, who was becoming more powerful by absorbing the powers from Uatu's corpse. By forcing Midas to absorb the power of the Watcher's eye, Fury overloads him and kills the villain in an explosion, which also seemingly kills Fury. The Avengers arrive, but find nothing. After the Avengers leave the Moon, Fury reveals himself to be alive and to have absorbed Uatu's powers. Because of this, he has become the new watcher of Earth, called The Unseen. Meanwhile, the Winter Soldier takes the mantle of the "Man on the Wall".

== Tie-ins ==
=== The Amazing Spider-Man #4–5 ===
At Parker Industries, Peter Parker (a.k.a. Spider-Man) is summoned by the Avengers. Hoping to rehabilitate his reputation after it was damaged during the period when his body was occupied by Doctor Octopus' mind, he goes to assist in their battle with the Mindless Ones. When he arrives there, the Orb activates the gouged-out eye of Uatu, causing everyone present to instantly attain heretofore hidden knowledge about their lives, Spider-Man sees that the spider whose bite granted him his superhuman abilities had also bitten a girl named Cindy Moon. Unable to control her powers, Ezekiel Sims convinced her parents to allow him to take her into his custody. Seeing that her mastery over her powers was growing "too fast", Sims placed her inside a sealed vault. Spider-Man departs the battle scene to search for Moon. He recalls Madame Web's prior statement to him (during the 2011 "Spider-Island" storyline) that someone would take his place if he chose not to continue being Spider-Man. He also recalls the hideout that Sims offered to him to hide from Morlun (during the 2005–2006 storyline "The Other"). Although Sims told him that he made the room years before he knew Spider-Man's identity, Spider-Man realizes that Sims knew his secret from the outset, and that the vault in which Moon has been imprisoned was built for him as well. Spider-Man frees Moon, an event that causes Morlun, residing far away, to sense her presence. Moon fashions a costume out of her spider webbing, takes the name Silk, and leaves the facility. She angrily informs Spider-Man that opening the vault will alert Morlun, and after Spider-Man tells her that he has come back from the dead at least once, she realizes Morlun could be at large. Despite her anger at Spider-Man's flippant attitude toward the danger they are both in, the two superhumans find themselves in a romantic embrace. Meanwhile, Black Cat kidnaps Sajani Jaffrey, Parker's partner at Parker Industries.

The crime boss Eel is confronted by Black Cat and Electro, who inform him that they are taking over his criminal enterprise. Black Cat then arrives at a meeting of criminal bosses and tells Mister Negative that she wants in on "the big leagues". Despite her low standing in the criminal community on account of how she was previously humbled by Spider-Man, she informs them that she intends to destroy Spider-Man. Meanwhile, during their moment of passion, Silk reveals that she knows Spider-Man' is Peter Parker, which brings both back to their senses, after having succumbed to "a primal connection", which Silk suggests may be because they were bitten by the same spider. Returning to Parker's apartment, Parker explains the recent events and introduces Moon to his employee and confidant Anna Maria Marconi, who tells him that Sajani Jaffrey, who was due to make an announcement on the Fact Channel on behalf Parker Industries on the news, is missing. Parker goes to the Fact Channel studio to make the announcement himself, but the Black Cat and Electro attack the studio, leading to a battle with Spider-Man and Silk. During the battle, Spider-Man is incapacitated, and Black Cat prepares to unmask him in front of the running TV cameras. J. Jonah Jameson ruins this by standing in front of the camera and announcing that Spider-Man's identity will be revealed, only for the angle that he is standing at preventing anyone from seeing Spider-Man's face long enough for Silk to knock Black Cat back and Spider-Man to put his mask back on. Although Electro accepts being depowered when his uncontrollable abilities prove dangerous even to himself, Black Cat continues her vendetta against Spider-Man regardless of who is behind the mask.

=== Original Sin #3.1–3.4 ===
When confronted by the eye of the murdered Uatu, Bruce Banner experiences some of Tony Stark's memories of their first meeting before they became the Hulk or Iron Man. During this vision, Banner witnesses Stark's modifications of the gamma bomb, prompting Banner to realize that Stark had a hand in his becoming the Hulk. Experiencing the same vision, Stark tries to deny that he could have done such a thing, but his research only confirms that he repressed the memory of making the modifications while Banner uses a modified Extremis virus to transform into the Hulk while retaining his intellect. Attempting to escape the Hulk, Iron Man flees to his new city of Troy, incredulous at what their vision revealed. While retreating into the undercity, he experiences a new epiphany of something else he did to Banner in the past. After Hulk destroys Iron Man's latest Hulkbuster armor and takes him back to the original gamma bomb test site where he first became the Hulk, Iron Man reveals that when he analyzed the gamma bomb, he determined that Banner's modifications had actually concentrated the original explosive potential of the bomb, while Stark's changes had reduced the blast enough for Banner and other observers to have survived. Accepting that Iron Man's interference, although unwanted, had been for the best, Banner departs, unaware of another secret of Stark's: He had sent Banner an e-mail warning Banner about the mutative consequences of the gamma bomb that Banner did not read, meaning that the Hulk's creation was caused by Banner's own frustration and ego preventing him from listening to Stark.

=== Original Sin #5.1–5.5 ===
When Thor is confronted by the eye of the murdered Uatu, it is revealed that Angela is the daughter of Odin, making her Thor and Loki's sister. She was "killed" as an infant during Asgard's war with the Angels of the Tenth Realm, a crime that resulted in Odin severing the tenth realm from the other nine as "punishment" for their attack. Upon learning this, Thor returns to Asgard to confront his mother Frigga about this. He subsequently travels to the Tenth Realm with Loki to learn more about his sister, unaware that the evil adult future Loki is working behind the scenes.

Upon arriving in the Tenth Realm, known as Heven, Thor and young Loki are attacked by Heven's guards. The realm is a predominantly female caste society focused on wealth acquisition with little to no desire for honor. The Queen of Angels convinces Loki to sit down and talk. Meanwhile, the Guardians of the Galaxy and Angela are attacked in warp space by a band of pirates called Warpjackers but Angela abandons the Guardians when the adult Loki telepathically tells her that the portal to Heven is once again open and that she can go home now. Meanwhile, as Thor battles Heven's guards, Angela appears, having been guided to the doorway to Heven by Loki, and prepares to battle Thor.

As Thor and Angela battle, the Queen of Angels tells young Loki another shocking secret about Odin. During the times before recorded history, the Angels were protectors of ancient mankind from rogue Asgardians who hunted man for sport. But in reality, Odin hired the Angels to kill the rogues as a secret way of keeping his people in line. As time went on, Odin learned that Asgard's enemies at the time collectively paid the Queen to betray Asgard to weaken it for an invasion. The Queen stole Odin's newborn daughter Aldrif (baby Angela) and "killed" her as compensation. In response, Odin severed the Tenth Realm as punishment, but the Queen convinced her people Odin was a liar who refused to pay his debt and severed her realm from Yggdrasil. Loki tells the Queen that despite the good he has done for Asgard in recent times, his people do not trust him. The Queen offers Loki a position among her advisors and Loki accepts, turning himself into a woman known as Mistress of Strategies. As Angela defeats a tired Thor, the Queen of Angels brought him before her, and the now-female Loki tells Thor that being on the winning sides seems just perfect.

While Loki led an Angel fleet to Asgard, under the false pretense to help them destroy it, Thor escaped captivity and, once again, engaged Angela in combat. Odin was later freed from his self-exile by Loki as he is set to return to Asgardia alongside a revived Serpent.

Before Thor defeats Angela the battle is interrupted when Odin arrives where he recognized Angela as his daughter and revealed Angela's true lineage. Time ago, the Angel tasked to dispose Aldrif's body found out the baby was alive and raised her as one of the Angels under the name of Angela. Due to her services for the Angels, the Queen pardoned Angela her life, but exiled her from Heven due to her lineage. After leaving Heven, Odin tells Thor, Loki, and Angela that he still loves his children. Angela then decides to leave in order to explore the other realms.

=== Original Sins ===
Original Sins is an anthology title, each issue of which consists of three to four stories.

==== Issue #1 ====
Henry Hayes, the cyborg assassin known as Deathlok, is stopped at Grand Central Terminal by a stranger named Seth Horne who gained knowledge of Hayes' identity when Orb activated Uatu's eyeball in New York in Original Sin #1 -2. Horne claims to be a fan of Hayes' work, but Hayes denies this and walks away. Hayes is then sent a command that activates his cybernetic left eye, which glows red. His behavior suddenly changes, and he goes to confronts Horne in a Terminal restroom, and kills him because, as Hayes says, he knows too much.

==== Issue #2 ====
Black Legacy: An author named Rebecca Stevens seeks out Dane Whitman, telling him she knows the legacy of the Ebony Blade and how every wielder of it succumbs to its dark curse. She says the explosion of the Watcher's Eye let her see how Whitman, as the Black Knight, nearly killed an armored criminal. She insists she can help but Whitman tells her to go away, claiming he has it under control while in reality barely holding on.

Before Your Eyes: As he flies through the air from a car accident gone wrong, Howard the Duck reflects on how the Watcher's Eye revealed he was destined to be the most brilliant mind on his planet (and perhaps the galaxy) but hid from it. He uses his knowledge to save himself, falling into a dumpster as a sign of how much he has wasted his potential.

==== Issue #3 ====
Whispers of War: Lineage, an Inhuman with the ability to absorb the life force of other Inhumans and have their faces appear on his skin, hears from a "seedling" Inhuman killed during the Orb's attack. The man tells Lineage of how, in the past, Black Bolt fought a Kree force trying to use the Terrigen Mists, wiping them out. Lineage realizes Black Bolt thus kicked off the war between the Inhumans and the Kree and plans to use this for his own ends.

Bury the Lead: The eye of the murdered Uatu revealed that J. Jonah Jameson had fired a former Daily Bugle employee for viewing an embarrassing article that he wrote in which he praised Spider-Man in his early days of being a wrestler.

==== Issue #4 ====
A Wall Street wheeler-dealer learns a secret about Doctor Doom and plans to use this to blackmail his way to wealth, boasting about it to a friend who urges him not to do this. Just as the meeting is about to take place, the man learns that everyone he sent the information to has been violently murdered. He is then ushered in, realizing too late Doom has been steps ahead of him all along.

==== Issue #5 ====
Dum Dum Dugan arrives at Fury's base, shocked to see the elderly Fury. When Fury says his Infinity Formula is running out, Dugan says his body still contains copious amounts of it, and offers a transfusion. However, Fury brings Dugan into a lab to see various Life Model Decoys, and reveals that Dugan's youth is not derived from the formula, but from the fact that he is an LMD. Fury relates that the real Dugan was killed in an early S.H.I.E.L.D. mission in 1966, something only Fury knows about. Unable to handle the loss of his best friend, Fury used a special LMD to rebuild him, occasionally killed off but rebuilt. Fury says he needed Dugan as his conscience, but the LMD Dugan is angered by this, declaring that it is the last thing that he wanted. He says he is a reminder of all the dark things Fury has done and that as long as he feels bad about it, he can still call himself the good guy. He declares the real Dugan died believing Fury to be a hero and he can still be that way. The Dugan LMD then puts his pistol to his head, asks Fury not to bring him back, and fatally shoots himself. Looking at the fallen LMD, Fury states "Sorry, Dum Dum, but that's not how the world works" as a new LMD Dugan is activated.

== Titles involved ==
Title	Issue(s)	Citation(s)
Core miniseries
Original Sin	#0–8	
Tie-ins
All-New Invaders	#6–7	
The Amazing Spider-Man	#4–5	
Avengers	#29–34	
Daredevil	#6–7	
Deadpool	#29–33	
Fantastic Four	#6–8	
Guardians of the Galaxy	#18–20	
Mighty Avengers	#10–12	
Nova	#18–20	
Operation S.I.N.	#1–5	
Original Sin Annual	#1	
Original Sin: Iron Man vs. Hulk	#3.1–3.4	
Original Sin: Secret Avengers (Infinite Comic)	#1–2	
Original Sin: Thor & Loki: The Tenth Realm	#5.1–5.5	
Original Sins	#1–5	
Uncanny X-Men	#23–25	

== Collected editions ==
=== Hardcover ===
Title	Material collected	Publication date	ISBN
Original Sin	Original Sin #0–8, Annual #1; Original Sins #1–5, Original Sin: Secret Avengers Infinite Comic #1–2 and material from Point One #1	November 18, 2014	978-0785190691
Original Sin Companion	Avengers (vol. 5) #29–34; Deadpool (vol. 5) #29–34; Mighty Avengers (vol. 2) #10–12; All-New Invaders #6–7; Nova (vol. 5) #18–20; Original Sin #3.1–3.4, 5.1–5.5; Fantastic Four (vol. 5) #6–8, Daredevil (vol. 4) #6–7; Amazing Spider-Man (vol. 3) #4–5; Uncanny X-Men (vol. 3) #23–25; Guardians of the Galaxy (vol. 3) #18–20; Original Sin: Secret Avengers Infinite Comic #1–2	January 27, 2015	978-0785192121

=== Paperback ===
Title	Material collected	Publication date	ISBN
Original Sin	Original Sin #0–8 and material from Point One #1	April 28, 2015	978-0785154914
Original Sin: Hulk vs. Iron Man	Original Sin #3.1-3.4	November 4, 2014	978-0785191568
Original Sin: Thor & Loki: The Tenth Realm	Original Sin #5.1-5.5	November 25, 2014	978-0785191698
Original Sins	Original Sins #1–5; Original Sin Annual #1	April 28, 2015	978-0785191513
Guardians of the Galaxy Vol. 4: Original Sin	Guardians of the Galaxy (vol. 3) #18–23; Guardians of the Galaxy Annual (vol. 2) #1	March 18, 2015	978-1846536519
Deadpool Vol. 6: Original Sin	Deadpool (vol. 5) #29–34	December 9, 2014	978-0785189343
Mighty Avengers Vol. 3: Original Sin	Mighty Avengers (vol. 2) #11–14	December 23, 2014	978-0785190721
Nova Vol. 4: Original Sin	Nova (vol. 5) #17–22	January 6, 2015	978-0785189589
Fantastic Four Vol. 2: Original Sin	Fantastic Four (vol. 5) #6–10	November 25, 2014	978-0785154754
All-New Invaders Vol. 2: Original Sin	All-New Invaders #6–10	December 9, 2014	978-0785189152
Operation: S.I.N.: Agent Carter	Operation S.I.N. #1–5; Captain America and the First Thirteen #1	August 25, 2015	978-0785197133

== Critical reception ==
The event overall received mixed reviews, with critics criticizing the plot and pacing. On ComicbookRoundup, the series received an average rating of 6.9 out of 10 based on 214 reviews.
