= Empress (comics) =

Comic book series by Mark Millar

Publication information
- Publisher: Marvel Comics
- Format: Limited series
- Genre: Space opera/science fiction
- Publication date: April – November 2016
- No. of issues: 7
- Main characters: Queen Emporia; Dane Havelok; King Morax

Creative team
- Created by: Mark Millar; Stuart Immonen
- Written by: Mark Millar
- Artists: Stuart Immonen: Skottie Young (variant covers); Sean Murphy (variant covers); Steve McNiven (variant covers)
- Penciller: Stuart Immonen
- Inker: Wade Von Grawbadger
- Letterer: Peter Doherty
- Colorist: Ive Svorcina
- Editor(s): Nicole Boose; Rachael Fulton (associate)

Collected editions
- Book One: ISBN 1-302-90206-7

Empress is a creator-owned comic book limited series written by the Scottish writer Mark Millar, illustrated by the Canadian artist Stuart Immonen and published by the Icon Comics imprint of Marvel Comics in 2016. Set in the Millarworld, the series follows Queen Emporia, Empress of the Royal Empire that ruled Earth 65 million years ago, as she decides to leave her husband King Morax along with their three children.

In 2023, a stand-alone prequel series, Big Game, written by Millar and illustrated by Pepe Larraz, was published by Image Comics.

== Publication history ==
The publicity was launched in October 2015 via The Hollywood Reporter, with Empress announced as "a big, fun, bombastic space opera" from Mark Millar and Stuart Immonen, described by Millar in later interviews with IGN and Vox as a series his (young) daughters could read. On the developing the series' protagonist of Queen Emporia, Millar described her:

[Emporia] was young and impressionable when she married [Morax], just twenty years old, but now she's in her mid-thirties and realizes she has to get out of there. What seemed glamorous at 20 suddenly feels terrifying and for both her own sake and the sake of her kids she knows she has to leave. The trouble is, her husband is the most feared tyrant in the universe. How do you leave him and where do you go? I think all the best science fiction has a very human element at the heart of it and a mother wanting to leave a dangerous relationship is very easy for readers to relate to. I'm not really interested in high-concept ideas as much as human emotions being the driving force of a story. Even Star Wars was really just a lonely kid who wondered who his real father was.

The series also gained pre-publication attention when Millar revealed the series would take place on prehistoric Earth 65 million years in the past, where a galactic empire once considered the planet its capital, and that he credited an unnamed "pal" of his who ran the Millarworld chat rooms with giving him the concept for the series; on developing the antagonist of the series, King Morax, Millar noted:

The bad guy in this, Morax, rules ancient Earth and [actually] utterly adores his wife and children. He's not abusive to them in any way and actually has this strong streak of morality when it comes to his family and doing the right thing. The idea [with Emporia] is more that she's now in her late thirties and realises that all the things he does which keeps them in their incredible lifestyle is just unforgivable and she realises that by carving out what she thinks was a nice future for her kids she's actually doomed them to inherit this guy's appalling mantle. Her son is a lovely, gentle kid and she's especially worried about how he'd cope, but the big thing is that she just wants them to have a normal life. It's a bit like Carmela Soprano in that when she was nineteen this all seemed very glamorous, but the reality of it all has been growing on her and as she hits her late thirties she comes up with a plan.

While originally intended to consist of three six-issue arcs, only the seven-issue first volume of the series, collected as Empress Book One, was published by the Icon Comics imprint of Marvel Comics from April 6 to November 23, 2016, before the publication of subsequent volumes entered development hell.

In 2017, a one-shot, Empress: Rulebook, written by Will McLaren and illustrated by Luana Vecchio, was published by Image Comics as part of the Millarworld New Talent Annual 2017, an anthology annual consisting of one-shot specials containing winning entries from the online contest for up-and-coming creators held by Millar in 2016. Set before the events of Empress, the story explores the beginning of Emporia's struggles with living up to the image of empress, and ultimate decision to leave.

In 2023, Big Game, a crossover between every Millarworld property illustrated by Pepe Larraz, was published by Image Comics; while the majority of the story takes place on present-day Earth, 65 million years after the events of Empress, the Empress portion of the storyline is a direct prequel to Empress, seeing Hit-Girl accidentally travelling back in time to the reign of the Royal Empire of King Morax, who on seeing no record of his empire in modernity, sends one of his armies to invade the future under the command of Diabolos the Sorcerer. A new volume of Empress will be published by Dark Horse Comics, who also published an omnibus edition of the first volume.

== Plot synopsis ==
=== Chapter I ===
On prehistoric Earth, deciding to leave her husband, Queen Emporia and her bodyguard Dane Havelok commander one of the Royal Empire's starships, taking with them Emporia's three children with galactic emperor King Morax: the fifteen-year-old Princess Aine, who aims to be exactly like her father and does not wish to leave; the ten-year-old Prince Adam, a "gentle soul" whom Emporia fears would not survive the trials ahead to become an elite ruler; and Puck, Emporia's youngest child, at eighteen-months-old.

=== Chapter II ===
While Queen Emporia is on the run, with the forces of the Royal Empire in pursuit, Dane painted as the royal family's kidnapper in order to prevent a scandal in the eyes of the Imperial public, a plea for help on an alien stopover world along with a broken transporter could end the empress' adventure before it's properly begun, as Dane recruits his pilot, Tor.

=== Chapter III ===
Facing off against a new fleet of security sent by King Morax, willing to stop at nothing to get the boss' children back, Emporia and Dane must battle intergalactic beasts at every turn as they teleport between alien war zones and dead worlds in evading the forces pursuing them.

=== Chapter IV ===
Stranded on barren planet Golgoth without hope of escape, shrouded by a massive dust cloud, when two passing scrap-merchants think they can make a quick profit by selling Emporia's children as slaves, unaware of who they are, the family is torn apart again and left fighting for their lives.

=== Chapter V ===
With the heirs stolen to be sold into slavery at an auction, Emporia, Dane, and Tor, find themselves falling into the lap of a tribal priestess thirsty to use them as a blood sacrifice. Meanwhile, King Morax makes progress in tracking down his stolen children, executing everyone in his path, while Aine comes into her own as a warrior against the merchants that had planned on selling her off.

=== Chapter VI ===
After an intrepid chase across the galaxies, Emporia arrives at her long-lost sister's planet to escape King Morax, unaware that she is on psychic vacation, and someone else currently possesses her body. Embedded within her new-age sanctuary, Dane and Emporia decide to enjoy each other's company, secretly observed by Aine, who outraged, contacts her father and brings him to the planet.

=== Chapter VII ===
As King Morax finally tracks his wife and children down, family turns against one other and old secrets come out into the light.

== Reception ==
Issue #	Publication date	Critic rating	Critic reviews	Ref.
1	April 2016	8.4/10	17	
2	May 2016	8.6/10	6	
3	June 2016	8.2	6	
4	July 2016	9.1	6	
5	August 2016	8.8	8	
6	September 2016	8.9	4	
7	November 2016	9.7	3	
Overall		8.8/10	50	

== Collected editions ==
Title	Material collected	Format	Publication date	ISBN
Empress Book One	Empress #1–7	Trade paperback Hardback	February 8, 2017 July 5, 2017	978-1-302-90206-3
Prequel: Big Game	Big Game #1–5	Trade paperback	December 20, 2023	978-1-5343-9911-2

== Film ==
In May 2016, an Empress feature film was in development. Mark Millar was hired to produce along with Joe Roth and Jeff Kirschenbaum, and F. Scott Frazier was attached to write the script, with the film being pitched to studios as "part Star Wars, part Guardians of the Galaxy", after Millar had claimed an "A-list" actress to have already been cast to star on Twitter. In August 2017, Netflix acquired Millar's comic book publishing company Millarworld, and in July 2018, it had green-lit several adaptations of his works, including Empress, now to be written by Lindsey Beer, before the project entered development hell.
