= Ultimate Six =

Comic book series

- Ultimate Six #1 (November 2003). Art by John Cassaday.

Publication information
- Publisher: Marvel Comics
- Schedule: Monthly
- Format: Limited series
- Genre: Superhero
- Publication date: November 2003 – June 2004
- No. of issues: 7
- Main character(s): Spider-Man; Ultimates; Green Goblin; Sandman; Doctor Octopus; Electro; Kraven the Hunter

Creative team
- Written by: Brian Michael Bendis
- Penciller(s): Trevor Hairsine; Joe Quesada (#1)
- Inker: Danny Miki
- Letterer: Chris Eliopoulos
- Colorist(s): Dave Stewart (#1–3); Richard Isanove (#1); Ian Hannin (#4–5, 7); Avalon Studios (#6)
- Editor(s): MacKenzie Cadenhead; C. B. Cebulski; Nick Lowe; Ralph Macchio; Joe Quesada

Collected editions
- Ultimate Spider-Man Volume 9: ISBN 0-7851-1312-6

Ultimate Six is a seven-issue comic book limited series and crossover between Spider-Man and the Ultimates (2003), featuring the Ultimate Marvel version of the Sinister Six. The series was written by Brian Michael Bendis, penciled by Trevor Hairsine and inked by Danny Miki.

== Publication history ==
Ultimate Six is a seven-issue limited series published by Marvel Comics from November 2003 to June 2004. The series is a crossover featuring Spider-Man and The Ultimates against the Ultimate universe incarnation of the Sinister Six. Each issue of the series was released monthly and formed a connected story arc following the events of Ultimate Spider-Man #46. The first issue debuted in November 2003, with the final issue published in June 2004.

The series has been collected in various trade paperbacks, including Ultimate Spider-Man Volume 9: Ultimate Six (2004), which collects all seven issues plus Ultimate Spider-Man #46. A hardcover collecting this and 'Ultimate Spider-Man Volume 10: Hollywood' was also released in November 2004

The story takes place after the events shown in Ultimate Spider-Man #46.

== Plot summary ==
Electro wakes up from his three-week coma and goes on a rampage before being confronted by Captain America, Iron Man, and Black Widow. After appearing on TV, Kraven the Hunter and his lawyer are confronted by Captain America, Thor, Iron Man, Wasp, and Hawkeye to question him about his "enhancements". Hawkeye prevents Kraven from running off while Wasp disables the camera run by Kraven the Hunter's camera operator. The Ultimates detain the two villains in a maximum-security S.H.I.E.L.D. superhuman prison beneath the Triskelion along with Sandman, Doctor Octopus, and Green Goblin. As Hank Pym tries to get information from them during his interrogation on them, Nick Fury informs the five captives that they are detained because they have illegally altered their genetic code. Sharon Carter is having Kraven taken to his cell when he briefly assumes an animalistic appearance before his inhibitor collar activates. Osborn is convinced that "There will be six" prisoners.

Pym continues his interrogation on the criminal. Osborn starts to turn into Green Goblin as Pym grows big to subdue him. Six weeks later, Pym gives a status report on his interrogation to Nick Fury and the rest of the Ultimates. Otto Octavius wants to cooperate with his captors and is granted access to a laboratory, where his metal tentacles are held. He wills his tentacles to attack and then shuts down the prison's power, releasing the others.

Iron Man investigates the ruins where he finds Pym injured and unconscious under some rubble which does not bode well for Wasp who goes to meet up with Iron Man. Nick Fury immediately sends agents to collect Peter Parker just in case Osborn goes after him. Fury introduces him to the Ultimates, who do not believe that Spider-Man is a teenager and reminds them that he has defeated all five escapees on his own. From a secret retreat, Norman Osborn places a call to Chief of Staff Stone in regard to Nick Fury.

Norman Osborn and his fellow villains take refuge in Kingpin's house in The Hamptons. The President chews out Nick Fury in regard to the call from Osborn who blackmails the government or he would publicize his treatment at the hands of S.H.I.E.L.D. Fury dispatches the Ultimates. After Doctor Octopus hacks into the Triskelion, the five escapees then attack the Triskelion. Nick Fury asks for the status of Bruce Banner and Magneto. A S.H.I.E.L.D. agent states that Magneto is still locked up.

S.H.I.E.L.D. takes Spider-Man's Aunt May into protective custody while Fury and the Ultimates pick up the pieces at the Triskelion. Nick Fury is informed by Iron Man that Banner fell asleep after reading some magazines where he'll be awake in three days and that Magneto nearly suffocated when his oxygen supply was cut off during the blackout until the back-up systems for it kicked in. The escaped villains have abducted Peter Parker who was in costume and unmasked. They tie him to a chair as Kraven assumes his animalistic form and attacks Peter for costing him his TV show and causing his wife to leave him. Otto subdues Kraven as Osborn reprimands Kraven while stating that he is the weakest of the group. Osborn then humiliates Peter by recounting the accident that created him as he claims that he and Otto were Peter's parents in a way while calling him "my boy". Osborn then tells Peter that they will attack the White House and he wants Peter to join them. Peter refuses and breaks free. Osborn then threatens Aunt May and Mary Jane if Peter does not join them. The six attack the White House, but a S.H.I.E.L.D. helicarrier arrives on the scene.

The six and the Ultimates battle it out on the White House lawn. Captain America tells Parker that his aunt is safe and he turns on the Green Goblin. Iron Man has S.H.I.E.L.D. Control upload a genetic code sequence to his armor which enables him to do a temporary genetic paralysis on Sandman, Wasp defeats Doctor Octopus, and Thor defeats Electro while also defeating Kraven before he can attack Spider-Man in the Oval Office. Goblin attacks Captain America when his son Harry appears on the lawn asking him to stop.

While Harry talks to his father, the Ultimates bring him down. Harry tells Peter that he will kill all of them for what they did to his father. All villains are detained again and Peter Parker is reunited with his Aunt. Electro claims that he was biding his time to attack Osborn, Kraven is strapped to the bed claiming that either Doctor Octopus and Green Goblin mind-controlled him, Sandman is placed in different jars, and Doctor Octopus is told that his tentacles are in a different facility. A doctor tells Wasp the status of her husband and to inform Nick Fury of when Pym wakes from his coma. With Norman Osborn in a cryogenic chamber with half of his face in Green Goblin form, Captain America and Nick Fury talk about how the next war will be a genetic war and that the people in power decide what the wars will be fought over.

== Collected editions ==
The series has been collected into a trade paperback:

- Ultimate Spider-Man Volume 9: Ultimate Six (collects Ultimate Six #1-7 and Ultimate Spider-Man #46, 208 pages, June 2004, ISBN 0-7851-1312-6)

As well as a larger hardcover which collects the trades Ultimate Spider-Man Volume 9: Ultimate Six and Ultimate Spider-Man Volume 10: Hollywood:

- Ultimate Spider-Man Volume 5 (collects Ultimate Six #1-7 and Ultimate Spider-Man #46 and 54–59, hardcover, 352 pages, November 2004, ISBN 0-7851-1401-7)
