= Operation S.I.N. =

Comic book

- Cover of issue 1

Publication information
- Publisher: Marvel Comics
- Genre: Spy, superhero
- Publication date: 2015
- No. of issues: 5
- Main character: Peggy Carter

Creative team
- Written by: Kathryn Immonen
- Penciller: Rich Ellis
- Inker: Rich Ellis
- Letterer(s): Virtual Calligraphy; Joe Sabino
- Colorist: Jordan Boyd
- Editor(s): Axel Alonso; Jon Moisan

Operation S.I.N. is a five issue comic book miniseries published by Marvel Comics.

== Publication history ==
The series was published in 2015 and designed to capitalize on the premiere of Marvel's Agent Carter on ABC and to tie into the 2014 Marvel crossover event Original Sin.

== Plot ==
In the early 1950s, an alien energy source is discovered in Russia. Peggy Carter and Howard Stark try to find it - but a newly risen terrorist group named Hydra is also on the hunt for it. When the mysterious Woodrow McCord enters the picture and Stark accidentally causes a UFO to fire on Moscow, Peggy and her team must go underground. They discover a Hydra-run gulag that hides a mysterious woman just as Soviet scientists open a portal between worlds, and ancient terror is released.

== Reception ==
Matt Little of CBR.com expressed that the comic had a well-designed debut full of great art and stylish dialogue, but it didn't do much to distinguish itself outside of being a period piece. Jesse Schedeen of IGN stated that story in this issue is pretty unremarkable but that the characters are charming and have a good relationship, the setting is well-done and the art is good.

== Collected editions ==
Title	Material collected	Publication date	ISBN
Operation: S.I.N.: Agent Carter	Operation S.I.N. #1-5; Captain America and the First Thirteen #1	August 25, 2015	978-0785197133

== See also ==
- 2015 in comics
