= Ultimate Spider-Man =

Comic book series

- First issue of Ultimate Spider-Man, with the original cover by Joe Quesada.

Publication information
- Publisher: Marvel Comics (Ultimate Marvel imprint)
- Schedule: Monthly
- Format: Ongoing
- Publication date: September 2000 – June 2011
- No. of issues: 160 (+ 3 Annuals, 1 Special)
- Main character: Peter Parker / Spider-Man

Creative team
- Written by: Brian Michael Bendis
- Penciller(s): Mark Bagley; Stuart Immonen; David Lafuente

Ultimate Spider-Man is a superhero American comic book that was published by Marvel Comics from 2000 to 2011. The series is a modernized re-imagining of Marvel's long-running Spider-Man comic book franchise as part of the company's Ultimate Marvel imprint. Ultimate Spider-Man exists alongside other revamped Marvel characters in Ultimate Marvel titles including Ultimate X-Men, Ultimate Fantastic Four and The Ultimates in the fictional setting of Earth-1610.

Orphaned at the age of six, Peter Parker is an outcast and withdrawn teenaged science prodigy, who lives in Queens, New York. While attending a field trip to a scientific corporation, he is bitten by a genetically-modified spider and as a result, begins to develop spider-like superpowers, including enhanced strength, speed, agility, stamina, durability and reflexes, along with the ability to crawl solid surfaces and a sixth sense, which warns him of imminent danger, all of which he decides to utilize for personal gain. When an armed thief, whom Peter had encountered earlier and refused to stop out of spite, later murders his foster father/uncle in a robbery, a guilt-ridden Peter is later driven to use his abilities to atone for his partial responsibility in his uncle's murder, as the costumed vigilante Spider-Man. Now equipped with a responsibility to do good and help others under his Spider-Man alter-ego, Peter struggles to balance high school life and studies, his job as a web designer for the Daily Bugle, his relationship with his girlfriend Mary-Jane Watson, his family life with his widowed aunt, and his double life as Spider-Man, as he faces off against both superhuman and criminal threats to his home of New York City and contends with the hostility of the general public and the police authorities.

Ultimate Spider-Man first saw print in 2000 under veteran Spider-Man artist Mark Bagley and writer Brian Michael Bendis, who expanded the original 11-page origin story into a 180-page, seven-issue story arc. This duo continued to collaborate until issue #111, when Mark Bagley left the book and was replaced by Stuart Immonen.

The series was an unexpected commercial success, selling roughly 20 million copies worldwide and received critical acclaim from readers and critics, with specific praise to Bendis’s writing, Bagley's and Immonen's artwork, and the updated re-imagining of the classic Spider-Man mythos. Bendis and Bagley's run on Ultimate Spider-Man set the record for the longest continual run on a Marvel Comics series by two people, an honor previously held by Stan Lee and Jack Kirby on Fantastic Four. After issue #133, the series was relaunched, still written by Bendis with art by David Lafuente, though this relaunch was short-lived. It resumed the Ultimate Spider-Man title with issue #3 and continued with the original numbering with the 16th issue (#150) before the series was again cancelled with #160. It relaunched as Ultimate Comics: Spider-Man with artist Sara Pichelli in 2011, centering on the character Miles Morales. The direct edition of Ultimate Spider-Man #1 is a highly sought after comic book and considered to be one of the most valuable comic books of the Modern Age. The Ultimate Spider-Man branding would later be re-used in 2024 for a new comic book series set on Earth-6160, written by Jonathan Hickman and drawn by Marco Checchetto.

== History ==
=== Creation and development ===
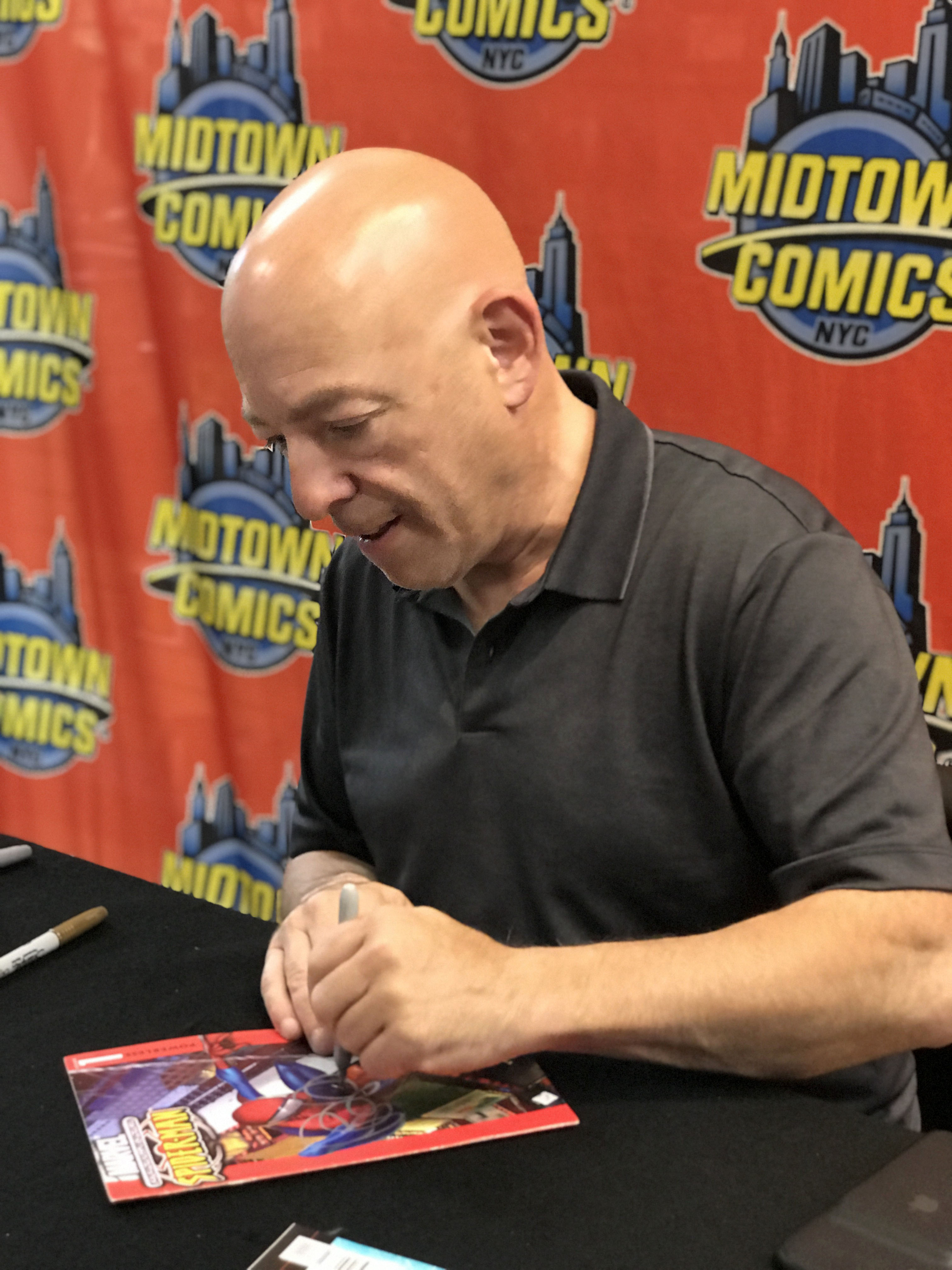
Writer Brian Michael Bendis signing a copy of the series' first issue at Midtown Comics in Manhattan.

Ultimate Spider-Man was the first series to be published in the Ultimate Marvel line. Publisher Bill Jemas wanted to re-invent the Marvel Universe because he felt that, with over 40 years of backstory, it had become inaccessible to new readers, and he wanted to start with a re-invented Spider-Man. Initially, Marvel Editor-in-Chief Joe Quesada was skeptical because 1998's Spider-Man: Chapter One, a previous attempt at re-envisioning Spider-Man's early adventures, had failed both critically and commercially.

Though Spider-Man's original origin story in Amazing Fantasy #15 was only 11 pages long, Bendis' retelling of Spider-Man's origin was seven issues long. Bagley was at first wary of Bendis' notoriously slow pace in advancing plot, describing it as a "real shock" at first. Jemas originally intended the comic to feature single-issue stories only, but Bendis chose to make each story roughly six issues long.

The first several issues were greeted with enthusiasm from fans and critics, sold well, and gave Ultimate Marvel a boost in credibility. After the release of Ultimate Spider-Man (along with Ultimate X-Men), Quesada and Jemas broadened the Ultimate Marvel line with The Ultimates (a re-imagining of the Avengers) and Ultimate Fantastic Four. Ultimate Spider-Man #1 was voted the "ninth-greatest Marvel Comic of All Time" in 2001 by readers of Wizard: The Guide to Comics. In addition to critical success, Ultimate Spider-Man grew to outsell the flagship Spider-Man title, The Amazing Spider-Man. Bendis would later describe issue #13, in which Peter tells Mary Jane his secret identity, as his favorite issue because it showed the trust that the Marvel editorial staff had in him.

As the series progressed within the next two years, reception and sales stayed strong, helped by the fact that Bendis and Bagley quickly found chemistry and enjoyed working together. Over the years, many 'mainstream' characters were introduced, often with different origins, costumes, and/or personalities.

Mark Bagley last issue on the book was Ultimate Spider-Man #111 in July 2007. Bagley and writer Brian Michael Bendis had worked on the series together since it began. Artist Stuart Immonen, already familiar with the Ultimate Universe from his work on Ultimate Fantastic Four and Ultimate X-Men, took over after Bagley. Issue #111, named "The Talk", featured Immonen's art for the first time. The issue was divided into two parts, with Bagley covering the art for one section, and Immonen doing the other. Issue #133 was the final issue of the series before a two-issue follow-up entitled Ultimatum: Spider-Man Requiem was released, revealing the status of the title's characters after the events of the "Ultimatum" storyline. Despite the book's apparent cancellation, in August 2009 Ultimate Spider-Man was relaunched with Brian Michael Bendis returning as writer and David Lafuente as artist. The book finished its run with #160 and subsequently was relaunched as Ultimate Comics: Spider-Man with art by Sara Pichelli.

=== Story arcs, issue numbering, and collected editions ===
The renumbering for Vol 2 #16/#150 was confusing to many readers. The letter page for Ultimate Comics: Spider-Man (2011) #8 mentions that issue 0.5 (1/2) was included in the total.

For issues 200 and 234 up, Marvel Legacy considers #54–133 and #150–160 to be wrongly numbered, and accounts for all major Ultimate Spider-Man comics written by Bendis:

1. 1–53 Ultimate Spider-Man (vol. 1) #1–53
2. 54–60 Ultimate Six #1-7
3. 61–140 Ultimate Spider-Man (vol. 1) #54–133
4. 141–142 Ultimatum Spider-Man: Requiem (vol. 1) #1–2
5. 143–157 Ultimate Comics Spider-Man (vol. 1) #1–15
6. 158–168 Ultimate Spider-Man (vol. 1) #150–160

== Characters ==
=== Main characters ===
- Peter Parker / Spider-Man – A shy, withdrawn and academically-gifted high school student, who lives in Forest Hills, Queens, New York City, with his Uncle Ben and Aunt May Parker. He is 15 years old and was orphaned when he was a child, after his parents were killed in a plane crash. Bookish, introverted, quiet and reserved, Peter was a lonely outcast among his high school peers, but was a good-humoured, bright and well-meaning young man, with a keen scientific intellect and was the brightest student in his class. On a science field trip to Oscorp Industries, a mutated spider exposed to the drug OZ, bites Peter in his hand. Instead of dying as expected, Peter begins to manifest various superhuman, arachnid-like powers, such as super-strength, speed, agility, stamina, reflexes and durability, along with the ability to crawl solid surfaces and a precognitive sixth sense, which detects and warns him of unseen danger. During a fight at his school, Peter blocks a punch from Flash Thompson, and this thrust of the punch accidentally breaks Flash's hand. He earns money to pay off the resulting medical bill by wrestling professionally in a red-blue costume provided by the wrestling promoters, until he was later fired from wrestling, due to being suspected of robbing the wrestling promoters' money. On his way home, Peter crosses a market. While he walks through, an armed burglar runs toward him from the market, having robbed a nearby store. When faced with the choice of stopping the armed robber or not, a spiteful Peter refuses to stop him and ignores the robber, since he was still angry from being fired from his wrestling job. The burglar later kills his Uncle Ben in an attempted home invasion. Wracked with guilt, he managed to apprehend his uncle's killer. Driven by his uncle's motto that "with great power comes great responsibility", he modifies his wrestling costume and decides to use his powers under the name "Spider-Man" to do good and help others in a bid to atone for his partial responsibility in his uncle's death. He manages to complete his father's research on adhesives, creating a formula used to create artificial spider webbing and utilizes the formula, as a crime-fighting tool, through the use of special wrist-worn mechanical devices called "web-shooters", which fire out strands of the artificial webbing. As he struggles from his innate guilt over his role in his uncle's death, Peter tries to balance studies, a job, a girlfriend, his family life with Aunt May and his dual life as the super-human vigilante Spider-Man, which more often than not, proves to be very difficult for him and in which he manages to barely succeed. Peter is killed in "The Death of Spider-Man" storyline, in a battle against the Green Goblin, although he is later revealed to have survived his death, thanks to his immortality, as the result of the same OZ compound that gave him his powers in the first place. Many years after the second Secret War is over where the Ultimate Universe is one of the few universes that has been restored, Peter returned to the role of Spider-Man, and is a member of the Ultimates.
- Mary Jane Watson – Peter's girlfriend and next-door neighbor. She is the first person Peter reveals his secret identity to, and the one who often fixes his costume and treats his injuries. Although Peter and Mary Jane love each other, Peter's life as Spider-Man is often a burden on their relationship. She was once transformed into the Demogoblin after being kidnapped from her bedroom by a facially disfigured clone of Peter Parker, who is determined to give her powers so that she is no longer in danger from his enemies. He pumps in her bloodstream an unquantified amount of OZ, the drug responsible for the creation of the Green Goblin, the Hobgoblin and also Spider-Man. Upon learning this, she becomes very angry and transforms into a huge, hairy, horned, red goblin-type creature. When the real Peter Parker and Spider-Woman show up, she calms down and resumes her original form, just in time for Peter (her ex) to render his evil clone unconscious. MJ is taken to the Fantastic Four's Baxter Building and when she wakes up, she is afraid and angry, causing another transformation. When she spots the Peter clone who was in the building, she calms down once again and reverts to her normal self. She is then given by Reed Richards what is believed to be a cure to the effects of the OZ formula, yet the ordeal has left her badly traumatized, and she is shown to be affected by panic issues and haunted by the scarred visage of Peter's disfigured clone.
- May Parker – Peter's independent aunt, who is in her 50s working as a secretary and regularly sees a therapist to deal with the death of her husband Ben. May used to hate Spider-Man because she believed he had no regard for innocent bystanders and hid his face behind a mask. In Ultimate Spider-Man #99, she learns Peter's secret identity, something that initially makes her angry, but after some time she accepts it. Aunt May seems to be scared of the idea of Peter risking his life on a constant basis, but supports him anyway. After the death of her nephew, she and Gwen Stacy emigrate to France. Writer Brian Michael Bendis based his depiction of Aunt May on his mother.
- Gwen Stacy – A street-wise girl who befriends Peter and Mary Jane. Mark Bagley's rendition of Gwen Stacy was inspired by an early-career Madonna. Mary Jane is initially jealous of Gwen for the time she spends with Peter, but Gwen ultimately reveals that she loves Peter only as a surrogate brother. Her father is NYPD Captain John Stacy. He is killed by a criminal in a Spider-Man suit, and she blames the real Spider-Man for his death because he became someone criminals could copy in order to hide their identities. Aunt May opens her and Peter's home to Gwen after her mother refuses to take her. While living with the Parkers, Gwen is killed by Carnage, which instills in Peter even more guilt. In Ultimate Spider-Man #98, Gwen Stacy appears again mysteriously, alive and well, and in Ultimate Spider-Man #100, she is revealed, in a hideous twist of fate, to be the new Carnage, her mind having been preserved within the symbiote before getting a new clone body. In Ultimate Spider-Man #128, the Carnage symbiote is absorbed back into Venom (Eddie Brock) and an examination of Gwen by Tony Stark reveals that Gwen is a 'molecular copy' and is the real Gwen come back to life rather than being a simple clone. The examination also reveals no trace of the symbiote.
- Harry Osborn – The troubled son of Norman Osborn, who is Peter's best friend and one of the few friends he ever had in school, who helps him out from being picked on by the school bullies and has known him since they were children. Having witnessed the accident that turned his father into the Green Goblin, he was trained by a psychiatrist to repress these memories. Disturbed by recurring images of his past, Harry develops hallucinations of a man named Shaw, who serves as Harry's guide to avenge his father's downfall. After being exposed to the OZ formula during his father's first transformation accident at Oscorp a few months prior, Harry becomes the Hobgoblin during a verbal confrontation with Peter, turning his skin orange with the ability to produce fire. After reverting to his regular form, Harry is detained by S.H.I.E.L.D, much to the dismay of Peter. As the Hobgoblin, his powers are similar to the Green Goblin's. When he first transformed, he was much larger than his father's original form; when he returns in issue #116 he is much smaller. He is seemingly murdered by his father in Ultimate Spider-Man #117. However, as revealed by a revived Green Goblin that the OZ makes him and Spider-Man immortal, it is possible that Harry might be alive somewhere.
- Liz Allan – Mary Jane's best friend. For the majority of the series, she is mutant-phobic. It was revealed that she herself is a mutant, with her father being the villain Blob. She eventually becomes Firestar. Shortly after that, Peter revealed to Liz that he was Spider-Man.
- Fred "Flash" Thompson – A bully who torments Peter Parker, and apparently had a crush on Gwen Stacy. He was the last of the recurring characters to discover Peter's identity as Spider-Man (after his death).
- Kenny "Kong" McFarlane – A former bully of Peter, who now has an on-and-off friendship with him. Initially a big fan of Spider-Man, Kong eventually figured out that Peter is secretly Spider-Man. Although he dated Kitty Pryde for a short period, they have ostensibly broken up. Kong has not been seen for a number of issues and may have moved out to the Midwest.
- Kitty Pryde – A member of the X-Men who dates Peter after he breaks up with Mary Jane. As her identity is public, Kitty wears a green and yellow masked costume when she fights alongside Spider-Man to avoid giving away his identity. Their relationship is hard, as they live quite far away from each other. Their relationship is silently torn apart when Kitty sees Peter kissing Mary Jane. In Ultimate Spider-Man #106, at the end of the issue, Kitty turns up as the new student at Midtown High, following her leaving the Xavier Institute in the wake of Professor Xavier's death. Despite her breakup with Peter, she still retains strong feelings for him. After Peter's death, Kitty leaves with Bobby Drake (the Iceman) and Johnny Storm (the Human Torch) to join Karen Grant (Jean Grey) in her new X-Men group.
- Johnny Storm / Human Torch – A member of the Fantastic Four and Susan Storm's younger brother. After the events of the Ultimatum wave, he moves in with Peter Parker. He also dyes his hair black to avoid exposing his secret identity.
- Bobby Drake / Iceman – The youngest founding member of the X-Men who had the ability to form ice around him. After the events of the Ultimatum wave, Bobby Drake is kicked out of his home for being a mutant. With nowhere else to go, Kitty suggests to Peter Parkers' Aunt May that he move in with her, Peter, Gwen Stacy, and Johnny Storm (who also recently moved in their household). Aunt May agrees and enrolls Bobby at Midtown High under the guise of Bobby Parker, one of Peters' cousins and shaves his hair off to help keep his, Peter's and Johnny's secret identities safe.
- J. Jonah Jameson – The editor-in-chief of the Daily Bugle, who hates Spider-Man and runs a smear campaign against him, which stems from the death of his son John a year prior to Spider-Man's existence. His most important employees are his right-hand man Robbie Robertson, and his best reporter Ben Urich whose articles helped to take down the Kingpin. Other members include Peter Parker working as a freelance photographer and web designer (who unbeknownst to Jameson is actually Spider-Man), Betty Brant, who works as one of the main secretaries, and Ned Leeds, also working as a reporter.
- Nick Fury – The tough, powerful, and connected head of S.H.I.E.L.D., who wants Peter to join the Ultimates when he is an adult. In Ultimate Spider-Man #27, he tells Peter that he becomes the property of S.H.I.E.L.D. when he turns 18 whether he likes it or not, but later replies that he will work with the Ultimates when that happens. It is unknown whether Fury will hold on to his promise, as the Ultimates have broken off from S.H.I.E.L.D. At the end of the "Hobgoblin" arc, he personally told one of his subordinates that he wanted everything figured out about OZ, and after witnessing him angrily responding to Harry becoming the Hobgoblin, Fury says "I think it's about time Peter Parker loses those Spider powers". During the "Ultimate Clone Saga", it is revealed that Fury had the Tinkerer create the Spider Slayers that were created to 'handle' Peter if he lost it. After the "Ultimate Clone Saga", Nick Fury has become more supportive of Peter. However, in Ultimate Power, he was taken to another universe, removing him from Peter Parker's universe. He later returned during the events of "Ultimatum", to finish off Magneto with the help of the X-Men.
- Ben Parker – Peter's kindly, understanding and avuncular uncle/father-figure, who is closely bonded with his nephew and along with his wife: May Parker, raised Peter like his own son and tries to teach him to be a good person, while also encouraging his academic pursuits and his rapport with Mary Jane. He is later killed by an armed robber early on in the series, which serves as a constant source of guilt and torment for Peter, due to his partial role in his uncle's murder, but not before he imparts Peter with the motto that "with great power comes great responsibility", which inspires Peter to use his powers for the greater good and to undertake his Spider-Man vigilante alter-ego.
- Richard Parker – Peter's late father. A brilliant biochemist, he was selected to be part of Nick Fury's team to redevelop Captain America's lost Super-Soldier Serum. He and Mary were injured in a related lab accident when Peter was an infant, which led to his adamant refusal to allow his and Edward Brock Sr.'s anti-cancer super-suit to be weaponized by Trask Industries later in life. It was during the legal battle with Trask when Richard, Mary, Edward Brock, Sr. and Edward's wife died in a plane crash. Recently, Richard resurfaced; allegedly back from the dead, claiming he did not get on the plane because he did not want involvement in the Venom (anti-cancer) project anymore. Since that time, he has been working as an underground scientist for the CIA to combat Nick Fury when and if he one day got out of control. After Gwen Stacy returns to the Parker's old house, he reappears to try to clear everything up. In Ultimate Spider-Man #103, Sue Storm tests Richard's DNA to confirm that he is really an aged clone of Peter. He is last seen in Ultimate Spider-Man #104 aging more rapidly and dying. Before he died from old age, "Richard" requested Sue Storm and the rest of the Fantastic Four to look after Peter. The real Richard Parker is still deceased. Richard was also the source of Spider-Man's "web fluid". Before his death, Richard was working on a "molecular adhesive". Peter finished the formula after becoming Spider-Man and uses it to fight crime (see Powers and abilities).
- Mary Parker – May Parker's sister-in-law, and Peter's mother. She died in the plane crash with her husband while Peter was a child.
- Dr. Curt Connors – A professor at Empire State University who sponsors Eddie Brock's Venom project. He tries to re-grow the arm he lost in the Vietnam War with lizard DNA, accidentally becoming the Lizard. Using a sample of Peter's blood, he inadvertently creates Carnage, which resulted in the deaths of many people. Connors later turns himself in to the police afterward for his creation of Carnage.
- Jessica Drew / Spider-Woman – A female clone of Peter Parker. In Ultimate Spider-Man #98, while investigating Mary Jane Watson's disappearance, Spider-Man encounters a mysterious masked woman who knocks him unconscious. The character is able to shoot organic webbing out of her fingertips, without the need of web-shooters. During a panel discussion at the New York Comic Con 2006, writer Brian Michael Bendis mentioned that the Ultimate version of Spider-Woman would make an appearance during the "Ultimate Clone Saga", which ran in Ultimate Spider-Man #97 – 104. In Ultimate Spider-Man #102, she rescues Peter from being arrested, and reveals that she is Peter's female clone, called Jessica Drew, but still retained all of his memories. She leads Peter to an Oscorp building in an effort to find MJ, where they end up finding the truth about Peter's clones. Jessica also discovers, much to her disgust, that her creator is none other than Otto Octavius. Together, they manage to defeat him. However, whereas Peter is ready to turn himself in to Nick Fury, Jessica promptly leaves to escape incarceration. Peter eventually finds her again, who tells him she has finally decided to embrace her Jessica Drew identity. After Peter updates her on MJ, Nick Fury, and Aunt May, and she gives him "the most awkward hug in the history of the planet". In Ultimate Spider-Man #129, she made her public debut as a superhero. At the conclusion of the Ultimate Doom story arc, she enlists in S.H.I.E.L.D. as an agent.
- Felicia Hardy / Black Cat – A cat burglar who blames her father's death on the Kingpin. Taking revenge, she steals a priceless artifact that he was going to use on his comatose wife. Hardy is interested in Spider-Man romantically, but in Ultimate Spider-Man #85, when she sees that he is a 15-year-old boy, she vomits on his costume out of embarrassment.
- Jean DeWolff – A captain in the NYPD. She offers support and comfort to Spider-Man whenever the strain of being a crime-fighter becomes too much for him. She was secretly working for the Kingpin, and was rumored to have been his lover as well. Punisher killed her in Ultimate Spider-Man Annual #2.

=== Villains ===
- Norman Osborn / Green Goblin – The unscrupulous CEO of Oscorp, an industrialist and scientist and the arch-enemy of Spider-Man. He develops an experimental drug called "OZ". After witnessing Peter's spider bite and seeing the resulting effects that OZ has on him, Osborn injects OZ into his body, and is changed into an insane, powerful, green-skinned monster. He has a physical structure similar to the Hulk's and has the ability to generate fireball projectiles from his hands. He is a scientific genius, especially in genetics. He knows Peter's secret identity, and uses that against him on several occasions. He is killed by Carol Danvers after he requested it, due to feelings of guilt over killing his own son, but is later revealed that he survived, and that neither Danvers nor S.H.I.E.L.D ever figured out a way to actually kill him after that. He eventually escapes and breaks out the Sinister Six for one final vengeful assault on Peter Parker's home, which ends with both he and Peter killing each other. This seems to be one of the first (if not the first) version of him where he does not wear a costume, but his body is actually mutated into a monster to be the Green Goblin. He is responsible for the death of Spider-Man in the Ultimate universe, prior to his revival. Like Spider-Man, the Green Goblin's OZ also gives him immortality. Brian Michael Bendis instructed artist Mark Bagley to pattern Osborn's appearance after that of actor Brian Dennehy.
- Otto Octavius / Doctor Octopus – One of Osborn's scientists and an industrial spy. He is described as "scary smart" by Harry. The four cybernetic arms he uses to manipulate hazardous matter were permanently melded to his flesh in the explosion that turns Osborn into the Green Goblin. He has been shown to have good fighting abilities, and once even managed to capture Spider-Man. In "Hollywood", he says that all he wanted was "a decent life". In the same story, he captures, unmasks, humiliates and tortures Peter for recent defeats and for ruining his life. During the "Ultimate Clone Saga", Doctor Octavius reveals that he played a huge role in the creation of the clones. Also during the saga, he reveals that he in fact controls metal, similar to Magneto, and does not need actual "arms", but he has become good at using his mechanical "arms". Octavius was murdered by Norman Osborn in the "Death of Spider-Man" story arc, because Octavius had decided that he no longer bore a grudge against Peter nor wished to continue being a criminal, and tried to back out as well as asking Norman to do the same and give up his vendetta.
- Eddie Brock / Venom – A childhood friend of Peter Parker who goes to college and works as a lab assistant for Dr. Connors. Their late fathers were lab partners who were at the second stage of developing a genetically created "suit" designed as a cure for terminal malady, meant to bond to the user and protect them from internal and external harm. The suit is tailored for a specific DNA, and the person to whom it belongs can control the suit more easily. If, however, someone uses a suit designed for somebody else, they are constantly damaged by the suit which requires nourishment, gained by feeding on organic flesh, to function. If bonded to an incompatible host, the Venom suit begins consuming them almost immediately, forcing them to feed to sustain it or die themselves. When taking a host, the organic matter that comprises the suit completely envelops the host, regardless of resistance, temporarily blinding it, before encasing itself in a hard, purple casing, similar to a pupa, as it bonds further with the host. When the host emerges, the suit then shifts its appearance and function to assist its host, such as creating eyes for it to see through, or tries to take it over, inducing a homicidal rage and attempting to feed itself if bonded with an incompatible host. When bonded with a host and forcibly removed, the Venom suit leaves trace amounts of itself in their bloodstream, which attracts other samples of Venom to itself, and can overload Peter's spider-sense. In the 2005 video game adaptation, it is revealed that absorbing the trace amounts in Peter's blood allowed Eddie to take complete control of the suit, gaining a greater ability to talk and a spider symbol on his chest. He was captured by the Beetle and delivered to Latveria, after which he has a cameo in The Ultimates 3 attacking the team. The whole Ultimates 3 and "Ultimatum" scenarios, including Venom's attack on the Ultimates, has all been orchestrated by Doctor Doom.
- Wilson Fisk / Kingpin – The head of New York organized crime. Fisk's wife is in a coma. He carried on an affair with police officer Jeanne De Wolfe, who he used to control Spider-Man. He knows Spider-Man is a teenager, but he does not know his name. The Kingpin was later murdered by Mysterio.
- Max Dillon / Electro – One of the Kingpin's hit men. Dillon gained his powers from a genetic tampering experiment orchestrated by Justin Hammer. During his final battle against Peter Parker, Electro was shot in the chest by May Parker, defending her nephew, and causing Electro to short out. He survived and fought Miles Morales twice.
- Flint Marko / Sandman – A ruthless criminal who gained the power to turn his body into a malleable sand-like material when he underwent a genetic tampering experiment which was orchestrated by Justin Hammer.
- Sergei Kravinoff / Kraven the Hunter – The Russian-Australian host of an action reality show. He wants to kill Spider-Man to boost his ratings. After his defeat, he briefly tampers with his DNA that enables him to assume a gruesome animalistc-like appearance.
- Herman Shultz / Shocker – A common criminal who wears devices on his hands that shoot sonic vibrations. He has no fighting skills and is nothing more than an annoyance to Spider-Man, whom he has fought against on at least five separate occasions. In "The Worst Day Of Peter Parker's Life", however, he manages to capture Spider-Man. He unmasks Peter and tortures him until Peter is saved by M.J. and Kitty.
- Alex O' Hirn / R.H.I.N.O. – A man wearing an impenetrable armor who has appeared several times to battle both Spider-Man and Iron Man, causing a lot of damage in the process.
- Blackie Drago / Vulture – A disgruntled former S.H.I.E.L.D. agent who has been hired by the Tinkerer. Drago's mission is to kill Donald Roxxon. Brian Michael Bendis instructed Mark Bagley to pattern the Vulture's appearance after that of actor Jason Statham.
- Mysterio – A mysterious magician who can create special effects and illusions with his advanced technology. It was later revealed that this Mysterio was an android sent by the Earth-616 Mysterio to subjugate the Ultimate Universe.
- Carnage – A vampiric organism created when Dr. Curt Connors experiments on his own blood, Peter's blood, and some of the material from the creation of Venom. Needing to feed on others constantly to repair his damaged DNA, he kills Gwen Stacy. In Ultimate Spider-Man #100, an over-stressed Gwen Stacy clone transforms into Carnage when she panics. It is later revealed that this Carnage was cloned by Ben Reilly and Doctor Octopus as part of a government super-soldier program and later escaped after awakening prematurely. In the War of the Symbiotes arc, Venom absorbs the Carnage symbiote, leaving a completely human Gwen Stacy. This Carnage was referred to as 'the Stacy Project'.
- Enforcers – A group of three henchmen that includes whip-wielding "Montana" Bale, strongman Bruno "Ox" Sanchez and gunslinger "Fancy Dan" Crenshaw. Their secondary leader after Kingpin was Mr. Big, who was scheming to overthrow him by using Spider-Man as a secret weapon. When the plan backfired and Kingpin discovered that Mr. Big was responsible for Spider-Man's assault on his office, he crushed the mobster's head while having him wear Spider-Man's mask (which was removed from Peter after he was knocked unconscious and thrown out a window during the assault the night before). Another Frederick Foswell also exists in the Ultimate Universe. His name is seen on a byline in The Daily Bugle in a published story on the death of Spider-Man.
- Elektra – The Kingpin's right-hand assassin. She later ended up in a coma when Moon Knight threw one of his crescent blades at her, embedding it in the back of her head when she was about to kill Black Cat. She was then thrown out a window by Black Cat and landed on a police car, but was mentioned by Jean DeWolff to have survived.
- Silver Sablinova / Silver Sable – A trained mercenary who leads a group called the Wild Pack. Sable had a troubled childhood, ignored by her father and abused by her alcoholic mother. Her father hunted Nazis and she forgave him at his deathbed and decided to follow in his footsteps. She has fought Spider-Man when hired by Roxxon, and manages to capture and unmask him for Roxxon.
- Beetle – An agent of the Latverians who was sent to New York City to retrieve a symbiote sample from Roxxon who debuted in the "War of the Symbiotes" storyline. During and before his theft, he was approached by Spider-Man. At first, the Beetle tried to avoid having to fight him. Ultimately, Spider-Man's interference foiled the Beetle's theft by inadvertently causing him to drop the symbiote sample, and making it worthless to retrieve.
- Elijah Stern / Tinkerer – A mechanic who used the Vulture, Killer Shrike, and Omega Red to attack his former employer Donald Roxxon. Brian Michael Bendis instructed Mark Bagley to pattern the Tinkerer's appearance after that of actor Paul Giamatti.
- Deadpool – A disfigured cyborg and anti-mutant extremist who hunts mutants for sport on a reality TV show, at one point capturing the X-Men and Spider-Man. While this version of Deadpool appears in the 2010 video game Spider-Man: Shattered Dimensions in the Ultimate Universe, that version acts like the Deadpool from the main Marvel Universe. It is unknown if Ultimate Deadpool can break the 4th wall like his main universe counterpart.
- Kaine Parker – A flawed clone of Peter Parker, amongst many others created by Doctor Octopus after being liberated from jail to secretly produce super-soldiers for the CIA and FBI. Needing a superhuman genetic template for his experiments, Octavius delighted in using Parker's DNA to desecrate the life of his foe. Kaine was mentally unstable, possessed a disfigured face, a sightless eye, and incomplete skin development. Believing himself to be the true Spider-Man, he kidnapped Parker's ex-girlfriend, Mary Jane Watson, and took her to the abandoned Oscorp lab in New Jersey. Thinking he would enable her to defend herself from super-powered threats, he exposed her to the mutagenic "Oz" formula he obtained from Dr. Octopus. He is later killed during the end of the "Ultimate Clone Saga" by Nick Fury's Spider Slayers while trying to protect Mary Jane from being taken into S.H.E.I.L.D. custody.
- Arkady Gregorivich Rossovich / Omega Red – A mutant with a hatred for humans. He at some point became a hired thug and was hired to attack a cargo boat belonging to Roxxon Industries in a conspiracy against the head of the company, Donald Roxxon. After his fight with Spider-Man at Roxxon industries he was captured by S.H.I.E.L.D., but escaped when the Green Goblin caused a mass prison break.
- Ringer – appeared, but ended up defeated by both Spider-Man and Shadowcat. He was handed over to the police. He would not again appear until the 150th issue where Spider-Man is fighting him after he stole $11,000 worth of diamonds. During the battle, the two caused millions of dollars in damages. Spider-Man beats him and he is again taken off to jail. He later appears attempting to rob a bank, until stopped by the new Spider-Man.

== In other media ==
=== Television ===
- Before Spider-Man: The New Animated Series became a loose continuation of Sam Raimi's 2002 Spider-Man film, the series was originally going to be a direct adaptation of the Ultimate Spider-Man comics. Brian Michael Bendis also worked as a producer on the series.
- The Spectacular Spider-Man animated series took many elements from the Ultimate comics, such as Peter Parker, Gwen Stacy, Harry Osborn, and Mary Jane Watson remaining as teenagers in high school during the majority of the series, the introduction of Kenny McFarlane into animated medium, Eddie Brock's personal relationship with Peter while working as a lab assistant for Dr. Curt Connors at Empire State University, Rhino's real name being Alex O'Hirn, Dr. Octavius working as an Oscorp scientist until his electromagnetic accident, both Spider-Man and later Eddie bonding with the Symbiote being kept in a secured lab, Venom's body being more monstrous in both size and shape, and Kraven the Hunter having his own DNA by Miles Warren which transformed him into a black-maned lion-like creature with elements of leopard and cheetah DNA.
- An unrelated animated series of the same name aired in the United States on Disney XD from April 2012 to January 2017. The four-part episode "The Spider-Verse" also featured a variation of the show's Ultimate universe, which confirmed that Ultimate Peter Parker had died fighting an unspecified threat while his mantle was long since taken up by a guilt-ridden Miles Morales. This series' Peter Parker is modeled after his appearance in the comics. Also in this series, Harry Osborn is the host for Venom instead of Eddie Brock and takes the form of Spider-Man's black suit, as Spider-Man's suit does not bond with the symbiote.
- In the 2017 Spider-Man series, there was also a season one episode with the same name and that this show's Kraven the Hunter had TV show-hosting traits of his Ultimate Marvel version.

=== Films ===
==== Live-action ====
- Sam Raimi's 2002 Spider-Man film uses many elements from the Ultimate comics, such as Peter Parker going to high school with Harry Osborn and Mary Jane Watson (who much like her Ultimate counterpart remains indecisive about dating Harry at first and lives with her abusive father and depressed mother), Peter being bitten by a genetically-altered spider during a school field trip, Norman Osborn working on developing a serum to create super soldiers and later injecting himself with the same serum to become Green Goblin (albeit only as an alternate personality and not a complete transformation), Peter letting a burglar escape after a bad experience from participating in a wrestling exhibit using his powers, Green Goblin threatening to drop Mary Jane from the Queensboro Bridge as opposed to Gwen Stacy in the mainstream universe, and Green Goblin's obsession with Spider-Man at wanting to form an alliance.
- The 2004 sequel Spider-Man 2, also adapts similar ideas from the Ultimate comics, such as Dr. Octavius working on behalf of Oscorp to fund his experiments, who also has a wife named Roselita (Rosie for short in the film). Doc Ock also sports a brown trench coat, which he wore for some issues in the Ultimate comics. In addition, an unused concept from earlier versions of the film's script reveal that Dr. Octavius is the creator of one of the genetically-altered spiders from the first film, and at one point also provides Peter with an antidote should he ever consider removing his own powers.
- The 2007 sequel Spider-Man 3 uses minor elements from the Ultimate comics Venom arc, such as Spider-Man's anger being fueled by the death of his Uncle Ben while wearing the Black Suit, Mary Jane's jealousy over Peter spending time with Gwen Stacy, and Eddie Brock being romantically interested in Gwen.
- Marc Webb's 2012 film The Amazing Spider-Man adapts several elements and aesthetics from the Ultimate comics, such as Peter Parker's personality, being bitten by a genetically-altered spider at Oscorp, Flash Thompson being a basketball player over football, Peter furiously leaving from a conversation with his Uncle Ben about his father and the importance of responsibility, Peter letting a thief steal from a convenience store, Gwen and Peter dating during high school and the Lizard and Police Captain George Stacy being visually inspired by their Ultimate incarnations.
- The 2014 sequel The Amazing Spider-Man 2 once again adapts several elements from the Ultimate comics, such as Richard Parker being a scientist working on a cure for diseases and Peter discovering old recordings of his father that explain why he had to leave Peter at a very young age, fearing that his research will fall into the wrong hands. Harry Osborn and friendship with Peter was similar to the one shared between Ultimate Peter and Eddie Brock Jr. His transformation in the Green Goblin is similar to his father in the Ultimate comics (with the Cross-Species spider venom being inspired by the OZ serum), and Electro and Rhino's designs are modeled after their Ultimate incarnations.
- The 2017 Marvel Studios film Spider-Man: Homecoming adapts several elements from the Ultimate comics, such as a more conventionally youthful Peter Parker and Aunt May, Tony Stark playing the role of Parker's mentor where here it extends to a father-son figure relationship while wearing an armor similar to his Ultimate incarnation, Ned Leeds being inspired by the Ultimate comics character Ganke Lee, and Miles Morales' uncle Aaron Davis' being involved in illegal activities. The bank robbery scene featuring criminals wearing plastic masks of the Avengers members is based on one of the panels of issue #42 (titled "Temptations) of the Ultimate comics. A building in the background of one of the film's scenes has graffiti with the name Bagley written on it, referencing Mark Bagley, the penciller for the first 111 issues of the Ultimate Spider-Man comics.
- In the 2019 film Spider-Man: Far From Home, Peter and Nick Fury's interactions are inspired by their relationship from the Ultimate Comics, although Fury is a lot less warmer to Peter. A twist in the post-credits revealed that this Nick Fury was actually Talos the Untamed in disguise.
- In the 2026 film Spider-Man: Brand New Day, Peter takes a bullet the Punisher shot at Jean Grey in a similar manner to what his Ultimate counterpart did for Captain America in the "Death of Spider-Man" storyline, though he survives thanks to Jean and Castle's intervention.

==== Animation ====
- A version of the Ultimate universe appears as the setting in the 2018 Sony animated film Spider-Man: Into the Spider-Verse. Unlike the comics, the film's version of Ultimate Peter Parker is blond, lived into his mid '20s, married Mary Jane Watson, and licensed his likeness to merchandising to provide funds for his superheroics, allowing him to build an underground lair beneath his house to fashion tools and spare costumes. The rest of the movie is loosely inspired by Ultimate Comics: Spider-Man. Peter Parker is not explicitly killed by Green Goblin, but Green Goblin is a pivotal part of the showdown that leads up to his death. Miles purchases a Spider-Man Halloween costume like in the comics, but it is not given to him by Ganke (who plays an overtly minor role but still appears and is Miles’ roommate). Ganke is also a fan of Spider-Man like in the comics. Miles creates his own suit which loosely resembles his red-and-black one, but it is given to him by Aunt May instead of S.H.I.E.L.D. Aunt May plays a role similar to the comics and also gives Miles his web shooters. Prowler is in his Aaron Davis incarnation and has a relationship with Miles adapted directly from the comics. Jefferson and Rio Morales are very similar to their comic appearances, though Jefferson does not resemble his comic incarnation physically. Kingpin does not play a role in the Miles Morales comics, but has his personality adapted from the Learning Curve storyline of the original comics. Scorpion is Latino like the Ultimate comics version, but also has weaponry similar to that of his original incarnation. Green Goblin heavily resembles his Ultimate incarnation, but borrows some elements from his original and MC2 incarnations.
  - In the 2023 sequel Spider-Man: Across the Spider-Verse, a band poster referencing the first issue of Ultimate Fallout, under which Gwen Stacy is mostly positioned, can be seen in her room while she speaks with her father in the beginning.

=== Video games ===
- A video game adaptation also titled Ultimate Spider-Man was released in 2005 for the PlayStation 2, GameCube, Xbox, Microsoft Windows, Nintendo DS, and Game Boy Advance. The game serves as a non-canon continuation of the Venom storyline, with an original story and cutscenes also provided by Ultimate comics creators Brian Michael Bendis and Mark Bagley. The game's plot would eventually be loosely recreated during issues #123-128 of the War of the Symbiotes arc in the Ultimate Spider-Man comics.
- In Marvel: Ultimate Alliance Venom has his Ultimate universe costume.
- A handheld prequel to the 2005 Ultimate Spider-Man game titled Spider-Man: Battle for New York, was released in 2006 for the Nintendo DS and Game Boy Advance. The game features an alternate retelling of Ultimate Spider-Man's first encounter with Green Goblin and features both as playable characters.
- A mobile game loosely based on the Ultimate comics titled Spider-Man: Toxic City was released in 2009.
- Ultimate Peter Parker/Spider-Man appears as a playable character in Spider-Man: Shattered Dimensions, voiced by Josh Keaton. In the game, Madame Web grants him his symbiote costume and uses her telepathic powers to keep it from taking over so he can retrieve fragments of the Tablet of Order and Chaos from his universe's versions of Electro, Deadpool, and Carnage more effectively. This section is not included in the Nintendo DS version.
- Another mobile game loosely based on the Ultimate comics titled Ultimate Spider-Man: Total Mayhem, was released in 2011.
- The Ultimate incarnation of Venom appears as a playable character in the 2013 game Lego Marvel Super Heroes.
- Minor elements of the Ultimate comics were incorporated into the 2018 Spider-Man game, such as Peter Parker, Mary Jane Watson, and Harry Osborn having known each other since childhood and Spider-Man and Kingpin's long standing enmity, with the former trying to take down the latter ever since he became the superhero and Mary Jane's job as a reporter, an idea that was inspired by Ultimate MJ's aspirations to become a reporter. The follow-up game Spider-Man: Miles Morales is also visually inspired by the Ultimate universe and the main storyline incorporates Tinkerer's vendetta due to a family tragedy against Roxxon Energy Corporation, an organisation that plays a significant role in the Ultimate comics.
- Marvel's Spider-Man 2 the 2023 video game also uses elements from Ultimate comics, such as Peter Parker having a similar hairstyle to his Ultimate counterpart during his high school years with Harry Osborn. The Venom symbiote is also used as a cure to heal the world from any disease or illness and Peter losing control over the Venom Suit.

=== Attractions ===
- An interactive attraction based on the Ultimate and mainstream Marvel universes was built in Niagara Falls as part of Marvel Superhero Adventure City. The ride has guests help Spider-Man stop different villains by shooting them with lasers. Spider-Man's look is based on his Ultimate version, but he is more experienced like his mainstream Marvel counterpart.

== See also ==
- Ultimate Spider-Man (2024 comic book), an unrelated comic book series set in on Earth-6160, following an older Peter Parker who becomes Spider-Man for the first time in his late 30s, already married with children.
- Ultimate Marvel Team-Up
- Ultimate Six
- Ultimate Comics: Spider-Man
- List of Ultimate Spider-Man story arcs
- Ultimate Spider-Man (video game)
- Ultimate Spider-Man (TV series)
- List of Spider-Man titles
