= List of Sinister Six members =

The members of the original Sinister Six

The Sinister Six are a group of supervillains in the Marvel Comics universe, drawn from Spider-Man's rogues gallery. There are several different formations of the group along the history of Marvel Comics' publications whose objectives vary from joining forces against Spider-Man or another common enemy to world domination mostly facing spider-man. The original Sinister Six first appeared in The Amazing Spider-Man Annual #1 (1964), with Doctor Octopus, Electro, Kraven the Hunter, Mysterio, Sandman, and the Vulture.

== Membership ==
=== Founding members ===
Character	Real name	Joined in	Notes
Founding members
Doctor Octopus (a.k.a. The Superior Spider-Man / The Superior Octopus)	Otto Gunther Octavius	The Amazing Spider-Man Annual #1 (October 1964)	Current member and leader of the Sinister Six. Left team after the third incarnation had disbanded. Founded the seventh incarnation of the team during the Superhuman Registration Act and disbanded after Ends of the Earth. While Octavius' mind was in Peter Parker's body, he captured and assembled his own "superhero team" which he controlled through tech implanted in the villains. The team later disbanded once the villains regained control; the team reassembled once again while under the influence of Kindred. Former member of the Masters of Evil, the Thunderbolts, the Avengers, Parker Industries, the Spider-Army/Web-Warriors and Hydra.
Electro	Maxwell "Max" Dillon	The Amazing Spider-Man Annual #1 (October 1964)	Current member. Left team after the fifth incarnation had disbanded. Re-joined team during Ends of the Earth and disbanded when captured. Later was brainwashed by Octavius (while in the body of Peter Parker) to join the "Superior Six". He regained control of his mind and left the team. Dillon re-joined the team while under the influence of Kindred. Former member of the Emissaries of Evil, the Frightful Four and the Sinister Twelve.
Kraven the Hunter	Sergei Nikolaevich Kravinoff	The Amazing Spider-Man Annual #1 (October 1964)	Current member. Left team after the first incarnation had disbanded.
Mysterio	Quentin Beck	The Amazing Spider-Man Annual #1 (October 1964)	Current member. Left team after the fourth incarnation had disbanded. Re-joined team during Ends of the Earth and disbanded when captured. Later was brainwashed by Octavius (while in the body of Peter Parker) to join the "Superior Six". He regained control of his mind and left the team. Beck re-joined the team while under the influence of Kindred.
Sandman	William Baker (a.k.a. Flint Marko)	The Amazing Spider-Man Annual #1 (October 1964)	Current member. Left team after the second incarnation had disbanded. Formed and led the fifth incarnation to get revenge on Doctor Octopus. Re-joined team during Ends of the Earth and disbanded when captured. Later was brainwashed by Octavius (while in the body of Peter Parker) to join the "Superior Six". He regained control of his mind and left the team. Joined a new incarnation led by Aaron Davis and later left the team. Baker re-joined the team while under the influence of Kindred. Former member of the Avengers, the Frightful Four, the Wild Pack and the Sinister Twelve.
Vulture	Adrian Toomes	The Amazing Spider-Man Annual #1 (October 1964)	Current leader of the Savage Six under the influence of Kindred. Founding member, left the team after the fifth incarnation had disbanded. Re-joined team during the Superhuman Registration Act and disbanded after Ends of the Earth. Later was brainwashed by Octavius (while in the body of Peter Parker) to join the "Superior Six". He regained control of his mind and left the team. Former member of the Sinister Twelve.

=== Sinister Six #2 ===
The second incarnation was formed by Doctor Octopus.

- Doctor Octopus (leader)
- Electro
- Hobgoblin (Jason Macendale)
- Sandman
- Mysterio
- Vulture (Adrian Toomes)

=== Sinister Six #3 ===
- Doctor Octopus (leader)
- Electro
- Hobgoblin (Jason Macendale)
- Gog
- Mysterio
- Vulture (Adrian Toomes)

=== Sinister Seven ===
- Hobgoblin (Jason Macendale, leader)
- Beetle
- Electro
- Mysterio
- Scorpia
- Shocker
- Vulture (Adrian Toomes)

=== Sinister Six #4 ===
The fourth incarnation was formed by Sandman to get revenge on Doctor Octopus.

- Sandman (leader)
- Electro
- Kraven the Hunter (Alyosha Kravinoff)
- Mysterio (Daniel Berkhart)
- Venom (Eddie Brock)
- Vulture (Adrian Toomes)

=== Sinister Twelve ===
This team was formed by Norman Osborn at the time when he was unmasked as the Green Goblin.

- Green Goblin (Norman Osborn, leader)
- Boomerang
- Chameleon
- Electro
- Hammerhead
- Hydro-Man
- Lizard
- Sandman
- Shocker
- Tombstone
- Venom (Mac Gargan)
- Vulture (Adrian Toomes)

=== Sinister Six #5 ===
The fifth incarnation was formed during the Civil War storyline.

- Doctor Octopus (leader)
- Grim Reaper
- Lizard
- Shocker
- Trapster
- Vulture (Adrian Toomes)

=== Sinister Six #6 ===
The sixth incarnation was formed following the Origin of the Species storyline and were the main antagonists of the Ends of the Earth storyline:

- Doctor Octopus (leader)
- Chameleon
- Electro
- Mysterio (Quentin Beck)
- Rhino
- Sandman

=== Sinister Six #7 ===
The seventh incarnation debuted in the Marvel NOW! event. After their defeat by the Superior Spider-Man, who took the Living Brain to be his own assistant, the remaining five became the lead characters in The Superior Foes of Spider-Man:

- Boomerang (leader)
- Beetle (Janice Lincoln)
- Living Brain
- Overdrive
- Shocker
- Speed Demon

=== Superior Six ===
The Superior Spider-Man (Doctor Octopus' mind in Spider-Man's body) captures and assembles his own "superhero team" which he controls through tech implanted in the villains. This incarnation debuted in Superior Spider-Man Team-Up #5 (2013). The roster corresponds closely to the original lineup.

- Spider-Man (Otto Octavius, leader)
- Chameleon (mind controlled)
- Electro (mind controlled)
- Mysterion (mind controlled)
- Sandman (mind controlled)
- Vulture (mind controlled)

=== Sinister Sixteen ===
In order to steal valuables from the Chameleon, Boomerang's Sinister Six (minus the Living Brain and the Shocker) ally themselves with the Owl, who hires 11 others to create the "Sinister Sixteen".

- Boomerang (leader)
- Owl (leader)
- Armadillo
- Beetle (Janice Lincoln)
- Bi-Beast
- Clown (half-brother of Eliot Franklin)
- Cyclone (Pierre Fresson)
- Human Fly (Richard Deacon)
- Kangaroo (Brian Hibbs)
- Man Mountain Marko
- Mirage (Desmond Charne)
- Overdrive
- Scorcher
- Shriek
- Speed Demon
- Spot
- Squid (Don Callahan)

=== Sinister Sixty-Six ===
Mojo and the Chameleon abduct Spider-Man and his X-Men students, and force them to star in a show which pits them against the Sinister Sixty-Six. The group, which is not seen in its entirety, consists of holographic stand-ins of various enemies of Spider-Man.

- Beetle
- Carnage
- Demogoblin
- Doctor Octopus
- Electro
- Gibbon
- Green Goblin
- Grizzly
- Hammerhead
- Hobgoblin
- Jackal
- Jack O'Lantern
- Kingpin
- Kraven the Hunter
- Lizard
- Morbius the Living Vampire
- Mysterio
- Puma
- Rhino
- Ringer
- Sandman
- Scorpion
- Shocker
- Tombstone
- Venom
- Vermin
- Vulture

=== Sinister Six #8 ===
The eighth incarnation is assembled by Swarm in Spider-Man and the X-Men. While stealing a delivery of gold, the group is confronted by Spider-Man and his X-Men students; after Swarm is defeated by Hellion, his teammates surrender.

- Swarm (leader)
- 8-Ball
- Delilah
- Killer Shrike
- Melter
- Squid (Don Callahan)

=== Sinister Six #9 ===
The ninth incarnation is assembled by Miles Morales' uncle Aaron Davis, who is wearing a re-colored and modified version of the Iron Spider armor.

- Iron Spider (Aaron Davis, leader)
- Bombshell (Lana Baumgartner)
- Electro (Francine Frye)
- Hobgoblin
- Sandman
- Spot

=== Sinister Sixty ===
In Friendly Neighborhood Spider-Man (vol. 2) #6, Spider-Man plays with Nathan, a cancer patient, where they envision that Nathan becomes Spider-Bite and they "fight" the Sinister Sixty who wish to obtain Spider-Bite's action figure of Spider-Man.

- Stilt-Man (leader)
- Absorbing Man
- Big Man (Frederick Foswell)
- Black Cat
- Black Tarantula
- Boomerang
- Calypso
- Carrion
- Carnage
- Chameleon
- Demogoblin
- Doctor Octopus
- Doppelganger
- Electro
- Enforcers
  - Fancy Dan
  - Montana
  - Ox
- Fusion
- Green Goblin
- Grey Goblin
- Hammerhead
- Hobgoblin
- Hydro-Man
- Jack O'Lantern
- Jackal
- Joystick
- Juggernaut
- Kaine
- Kingpin
- Kraven the Hunter
- Kraven the Hunter (Alyosha Kravinoff)
- Kraven the Hunter (Ana Kravinoff)
- Lady Octopus
- Lizard
- Mephisto
- Mister Negative
- Molten Man
- Morbius the Living Vampire
- Morlun
- Mysterio
- Raptor
- Rhino
- Sandman
- Sasha Kravinoff
- Scorpia
- Scorpion
- Scream
- Screwball
- Shocker
- Shriek
- Silvermane
- Sin-Eater
- Alistair Smythe
- Stunner
- Swarm
- Tarantula
- Tombstone
- Venom
- Vermin
- Vulture

=== Sinister War ===
In "Sinister War", six teams with 36 villains total are formed under the influence of Kindred and paired up in a contest to see who can take out Spider-Man first.

"Classic" Sinister Six (sinister six #10)

- Doctor Octopus (leader)
- Electro
- Kraven the Hunter - This version is a clone of Kraven the Hunter who was formerly known as the "Last Son of Kraven".
- Lizard - This version was separated from Curt Connors by the Isotope Genome Accelerator.
- Mysterio
- Sandman

Savage Six

- Vulture (leader)
- King Cobra
- Rhino
- Scorpion
- Stegron
- Tarantula

The Syndicate

- Beetle (leader)
- Electro (Francine Frye)
- Lady Octopus
- Scorpia
- Trapster
- White Rabbit
- Kraven the Hunter (Ana Kravinoff)

Superior Foes

- Boomerang (leader)
- Hydro-Man (replacing Beetle)
- Overdrive
- Shocker
- Speed Demon

Wild Pack

- Foreigner (leader)
- Black Ant
- Chance
- Jack O'Lantern
- Slyde
- Taskmaster

"Sinful Six"

- Sin-Eater (leader)
- Grey Gargoyle
- Juggernaut
- Living Laser
- Morlun
- Whirlwind

=== Sinister Six #11 ===
This incarnation of the Sinister Six fought the students of the Avengers Academy:

- Squid Kid (leader) - An A.I.M. operative and self-proclaimed Scientist Supreme with cybernetic squid-like tentacles that are a variation of Doctor Octopus' cybernetic tentacles.
- Apostate - Ailouros was a former Dora Milaje who was turned into a vampire when infiltrating a vampire hive called the Temple of the Shifting Sun.
- Lizard Boy - The son of Lizard, Billy Connors was given the Lizard formula to save his life, transforming him into a lizard-like form. He sustained amnesia and was left unable to remember his own name. Squid Kid later recruited Billy into the Sinister Six, promising him that he would be able to return to the surface world from his sewer home and eventually be restored to his human form.
- Mysteriant - Qaari Beck is the son of Maggie Beck and the first cousin once removed of Mysterio. Before dying from cancer, Mysterio gifted Qaari a ring that gives him illusion-casting abilities.
- Rhinoceress - Cindy Shears sported a variance in her DNA distinct from the X-Gene which gave her super-strength. She later wore a pink variant of the Rhino armor.
- Willow-Wisp - Ignacio Fuentes was once abducted by Alchemax during Norman Osborn's ownership of the company alongside his sister Lucy for a super-soldier experiment that ended up giving him a flaming skull. He then made off with a copy of the Green Goblin equipment.

== Other versions ==
=== Age of Apocalypse ===
In the Age of Apocalypse 10th anniversary limited series, Mister Sinister assembles his own group dubbed the Sinister Six to fight Magneto's X-Men. However, this group is unrelated to the more established lineup of criminals.

- Blob
- Cloak
- Dagger
- Phoenix
- Sauron
- Sonique

=== Avataars: Covenant of the Shield ===
On the planet Earth created by the Shaper of Worlds, the Sinister Six are known as the Six Most Sinister, a group of criminals operating a tollbooth in the Webwood who are led by the Goblin King. When the Champions of the Realm attempt to pass through the Webwoods, they are attacked by the Six Most Sinister, who they easily deal with and leave defeated as they move on.

- Tentaclus
- Jolt
- Huntsman
- Mysterium
- Sandstorm
- Talon

=== Devil's Reign ===
Doctor Octopus faces an unprecedented opportunity to scour the Multiverse, amassing an army of himself - the Superior Four.

- Doctor Octopus (Otto Octavius, leader)
- Ghost Rider (Otto Blaze)
- Hulk (Otto Banner)
- Wolverine (Otto Howlett)

=== The Fist's 2099 A.D. ===
In an alternate reality in 2099 A.D., where the Fist – a splinter group of The Hand – succeeded in destroying the country, the Sinister Six have taken over Alchemex and rule the dystopian New York. Their leader, the Goblin, however, is secretly an informant working for the resistance. After being discovered, she is killed by Doctor Octopus, and they instead find a new leader in Venture, who now employs them with the Fist, in the past.

- Venture (Qweeg)
- Venom (Kron Stone)
- Doctor Octopus (an unnamed Atlantean scientist)
- Vulture (Snidely)
- Electro (an android)
- Sandwoman
- Goblin (Jennifer D'Angelo, former leader, mole; deceased)

=== Gentleman's Sinister Six ===
In a trilogy of Spider-Man novels written by Adam-Troy Castro, a criminal mastermind calling himself the Gentleman formed a Sinister Six as part of an elaborate scheme to claim vengeance on Spider-Man.

- Chameleon
- Doctor Octopus
- Electro
- Mysterio (Quentin Beck)
- Pity (the Gentleman's bodyguard – and possibly Peter Parker's long-lost sister)
- Vulture (Adrian Toomes)

=== Insidious Six ===
The Insidious Six are a band of Demons from the "Dark Web" event. They are a collection of characters parodying important Spider-Man villains. They battled Spider-Man and Rek-Rap.

- The Grave Goblin
- Doctor Octoball
- Gorepion
- Kraken the Hunter
- Lizarro
- Rhiceratops

=== Marvel Universe: Millennial Visions ===
Millennial Visions brings a brand-new look at the entire Marvel Universe, including a Noxious Nine that was formed after the members of the Sinister Six joined with Rhino, Scorpion and Carnage in order to take out the Blin Quay Nuclear Power Station. Carnage was atomized in a containment field that caused an overload, releasing high levels of radiation and fusing the genetic material of the remaining members to their costumes, greatly increasing their power and making them more animals than men.

- Doctor Octopus
- Vulture
- Lizard
- Rhino
- Scorpion
- Frog-Man
- Carnage (atomized)
- Electro (deceased)
- Mysterio (deceased)
- Sandman (deceased)

=== Marvel Zombies ===
A zombified version of the Sinister Six appears in Marvel Zombies: Dead Days. They are seen attacking innocent civilians upon the S.H.I.E.L.D. helicarrier, but are repelled by Wolverine and Magneto.

- Doctor Octopus
- Electro
- Green Goblin
- Mysterio
- Sandman
- Vulture (Adrian Toomes)

=== Marvel Zombies Return ===
In the Marvel Zombies series, the Sinister Six appear in an alternative universe that Zombie Spider-Man enters, working for the Kingpin. They are quickly and violently ripped apart, bitten, and zombified (except the Sandman, who hopefully flees by turning into sand and disguising himself as the dirt that Zombie Spider-Man stood on), and end up eating Spider-Man's friends, which causes them to be killed in retaliation.

- Doctor Octopus
- Electro
- Kraven the Hunter
- Mysterio
- Sandman
- Vulture (Adrian Toomes)

=== Secret Invasion ===
Several variants of the Super-Skrull appear, including a Sinister Six Skrull with the combined powers of Sandman (William Baker), Hydro-Man (Morris Bench), Rhino (Aleksei Sytsevich), Electro (Maxwell Dillon), Venom (MacDonald Gargan), and Lizard (Curtis Connors).

=== Secret Wars (2015) ===
Various versions of the Sinister Six appear over various domains of Battleworld.

==== Spider-Verse ====
- Doctor Octopus
- Scorpion
- Kraven the Hunter
- Electro
- Sandman
- Vulture

==== Amazing Spider-Man: Renew Your Vows ====
- Doctor Octopus
- Hobgoblin
- Kraven the Hunter
- Mysterio
- Shocker
- Vulture
- Beetle (replacement member)
- Boomerang (replacement member)
- Rhino (replacement member)

==== Spider-Man: Spider's Shadow ====
After Peter Parker (Spider-Man) is consumed by the Venom symbiote, he goes on a killing spree, eliminating his rogues gallery one by one. J. Jonah Jameson begrudgingly calls upon Doctor Octopus to bring together the Sinister Six and combat him.

- J. Jonah Jameson (using a Spider-Slayer suit) (leader)
- Doctor Octopus (killed by Eddie Brock)
- Electro
- Mysterio
- Kraven the Hunter
- Rhino
- Eddie Brock (using Doctor Octopus' metallic arms after killing him)

=== The Sinister Syndicate ===
Formed by the super-villain Abner Jenkins a.k.a. the Beetle to act as a mercenary group that worked for the highest bidder. The group later reformed as the Deadly Foes of Spider-Man, before tearing themselves apart with in-fighting. When Boomerang became the leader of the Sinister Six, the Shocker suggested going back to the name "Sinister Syndicate", but the idea was shot down by Speed Demon, objecting, "the Sinister Syndicate were losers!"

- Beetle (Abner Jenkins)
- Hydro-Man (Morris Bench)
- Rhino (Aleksei Sytsevich)
- Boomerang (Frederick Myers)
- Speed Demon (James Sanders)
- Shocker (Herman Schultz)
- Leila Davis (mole)

=== The Sinner Six ===
An elderly version of the Sinister Six, dubbed the Sinner Six, appeared in Spider-Man: Reign. This version of the team is forced into the employ of New York's fascist Mayor Waters via microchips placed inside them that would detonate if they attempted to leave the city. If they succeeded in killing Spider-Man, they would be given their freedom. When the enraged (and elderly) Spider-Man returned to the superhero game, he seemingly killed the Scorpion by throwing him out of a window and Hydro-Man and Electro by throwing them into each other, as well as badly beating Kraven and Mysterio, before the Sandman revealed the existence of the bombs and handed a detonator to Spider-Man, sacrificing himself to stop Mayor Waters' plans after Waters was revealed to be nothing more than a pawn of his aide, Eddie Brock.

- Electro
- Hydro-Man
- Kraven the Hunter
- Mysterio
- Sandman
- Scorpion

=== Spider-Verse ===
A version of the Sinister Six names the Six Men of Sinestry appears in Spider-Verse in the dimension of Earth-803. Their objective was to steal the mayor's plan. They battled Lady Spider and were forced to retreat after they were overwhelmed, yet they were able to accomplish their task.

- Green Goblin (Lord Norman Osborne)
- Doctor Octopus (Otto Octavius)
- Electro (Max Dillon)
- Kraven the Hunter (Sergei Kravinoff)
- Mysterio (Quentin Beck)
- Vulture (Adrian Toomes)

=== Swinester Six ===
The Swinester Six was an alliance of Spider-Ham villains.

- Doctor Octopussycat (Otto, Leader)
- Buzzard
- Ducktor Doom
- Eelectro
- Green Gobbler (Norman Osbird Jr.)
- M.O.O.D.O.K.
- Mysteriape
- Pork Grind
- Raven the Hunter (Sergei Ravenoff)
- Sandmanatee

=== The Ultimate Six ===
In the Ultimate Marvel universe, the Sinister Six is renamed the Ultimate Six. The original five villainous members initially attempted to recruit Spider-Man as the sixth member, but failed to do so. The Vulture would later join the team.

- Green Goblin (leader)
- Doctor Octopus
- Electro
- Kraven the Hunter
- Sandman
- Vulture

=== Web-Warriors ===
The Sinister Sextet of Earth-311 is founded by the dimension's version of Carnage.

- Carnage
- Electro
- Hobgoblin
- Kraven the Hunter
- Mysterio
- Lizard

=== Kingpin's Sinister Six ===
The Sinister Six of Earth-6160 is formed by Kingpin.

- Kingpin (leader) - The shadow governor of New York City who is loyal to Maker's Council and nicknamed the "Kingpin of Manhattan".
- Black Cat (Walter Hardy) - A former master thief who manages the Bronx on Fisk's behalf.
- Black Cat (Felicia Hardy) - The daughter of Walter Hardy who fills in for him while he was recuperating from being knocked off a building during a fight with Spider-Man and Green Goblin.
- Kraven the Hunter - A billionaire oligarch exiled during the "Rasputin Purge" who manages Staten Island on Kingpin's behalf. Killed by Mysterio.
- Mister Negative - The leader of the Inner Demons who manages Queens on Kingpin's behalf.
- Mole Man - A friend of Kingpin who manages New York City's underground and Subterranea on Kingpin's behalf.
- Mysterio - A mysterious individual who manages Brooklyn on Kingpin's behalf.

=== Insectoid Six ===
- Doc-Roach (Otto Octavius)
- Dragonfly (Adrian Toomes)
- Lightning Bug (Francine Frye)
- Morbsquito (Michael Morbius)
- Rhino-Beetle (Aleksei Sytsevich)
- Scorpion (MacDonald Gargan)

=== Symbiote Six ===
The Symbiote Six was the Earth-11964 version of the Sinister Six that all bonded with the feral Venom symbiote after it had killed Spider-Man.

- Doctor Octopus (Otto Octavius) (leader)
- Electro (Max Dillon)
- Kraven the Hunter (Sergei Kravinoff)
- Lizard (Curtis Connors)
- Rhino (Aleksei Sytsevich)
- Vulture (Adrian Toomes)

== Film ==
=== Spider-Man: Into the Spider-Verse ===
The team appears under the corporate holding "Alchemax", attempting to create portals to alternate universes.

- Doctor Octopus (Olivia Octavius)
- Green Goblin (Norman Osborn)
- Kingpin (Wilson Fisk)
- Prowler (Aaron Davis)
- Scorpion (Maximus Gargan)
- Tombstone (Lonnie Lincoln)

=== Spider-Man: No Way Home ===
The Marvel Cinematic Universe (MCU) film Spider-Man: No Way Home features a 5-member supervillain team which very closely resembles the Sinister Six. This variation of the team consists of alternate timeline variations of the characters from the Sony Sam Raimi and Marc Webb Spider-Man films. In a post-credits scene Venom (Eddie Brock) is revealed to have also been brought to the MCU timeline from Sony's Spider-Man Universe, though he does not join the other characters.

- Norman Osborn / Green Goblin
- Dr. Otto Octavius / Doctor Octopus
- Flint Marko / Sandman
- Dr. Curt Connors / The Lizard
- Max Dillon / Electro

== Television ==
Former members and replacements listed last

=== Spider-Man: The Animated Series ===
A version of the Sinister Six appeared in Spider-Man: The Animated Series, renamed the Insidious Six. This incarnation was formed by the Kingpin and is assisted remotely by Alistair Smythe.

- Doctor Octopus (Otto Octavius, leader)
- Scorpion (Mac Gargan)
- Rhino
- Shocker
- Chameleon
- Mysterio (Quentin Beck, former member, deceased)
- Vulture (Adrian Toomes, replacing Mysterio)

=== The Spectacular Spider-Man ===
The Sinister Six appears in the Spectacular Spider-Man animated series, a group of supervillains led and formed by Doctor Octopus in order to physically beat Spider-Man.

- Doctor Octopus / Master Planner (Otto Octavius, leader)
- Electro (Max Dillon)
- Rhino (Alexander O'Hirn)
- Sandman (Flint Marko)
- Vulture (Adrian Toomes)
- Shocker / Montana (Jackson Brice, former members)
- Mysterio (Quentin Beck, replacing the Shocker)
- Kraven the Hunter (Sergei Kravinoff, substituting in the field for Doctor Octopus)

=== Ultimate Spider-Man ===
Several versions of the Sinister Six (later, the "Sinister Seven" and the "Superior Sinister Six") appear in the Ultimate Spider-Man animated series, led by Doctor Octopus.

- Doctor Octopus is a member in all four versions of the group.
- Kraven the Hunter is a member in all four versions of the group.
- Rhino is a member in all four versions of the group.
- Electro is a member of the first, second, and third versions of the group.
- Lizard (Curt Connors) is a member of the first and second groups.
- Beetle is a member of the first group.
- Scorpion is a member of the second and fourth groups.
- Green Goblin is a member of the third group.
- Hydro-Man is a member of the third group.
- Scarlet Spider is a member of the third group.
- Vulture is a member of the fourth group.
- Crossbones is a member of the fourth group.

=== Marvel's Spider-Man ===
The Sinister Six appear in the 2017 Spider-Man animated series, led by Doctor Octopus. At first, the group is formed by Norman Osborn as the "Osborn Commandos" until Octopus takes over. Unlike other incarnations, this team is known as the "Sinister Five" until Octopus brainwashes Spider-Man into being their sixth member.

- Doctor Octopus (leader)
- Vulture
- Rhino
- Alistair Smythe / Spider-Slayer
- Steel Spider
- Spider-Man

== Live action ==
=== The Amazing Adventures of Spider-Man ===
The Sinister Six appear as the Sinister Syndicate in the theme park attraction The Amazing Adventures of Spider-Man. The group has captured the Statue of Liberty with an anti-gravity gun, and attacks the guests.

- Doc Ock (Otto Octavius)
- Electro (Maxwell Dillon)
- Hobgoblin (Edward Leeds)
- Hydro-Man (Morris Bench)
- Scream (Donna Diego)

=== Spider-Man: Turn Off the Dark ===
The Sinister Six appears in the musical Spider-Man: Turn Off the Dark. In this version, their comic book origins are ignored. Instead, they share a common origin as former research scientists whom the Green Goblin deliberately mutates into "freaks" as punishment for having abandoned Osborn Industries. Swiss Miss is an original character created for the musical. In the story, she is created by the narrator of the play who felt the team could use a "woman's touch".

- Carnage
- Electro
- Kraven the Hunter
- Lizard
- Swarm
- Swiss Miss

=== Marvel Universe Live! ===
- Green Goblin (Norman Osborn, leader)
- Doctor Octopus (Otto Octavius, second-in-command)
- Black Cat (Felicia Hardy)
- Electro (Maxwell "Max" Dillon)
- Lizard (Dr. Curtis Connors)
- Rhino (Aleksei Sytsevich)

== Audio ==
=== Marvel's Squirrel Girl: The Unbeatable Radio Show! ===
The Sinister Six became the Frightful Five after Kraven the Hunter was fired from the group after trying to quit it. Kraven befriended Squirrel Girl who convinced him to turn good; he moved to the Savage Land to protect dinosaurs from poachers. The Shocker stole some Pym Particles and was set to style himself as "The Giant Sized Shocker" before being talked down and inspired to do good by Squirrel Girl on her podcast, encouraging him to use his powers to turn turbines and generate clean and affordable electricity, making more money than bank robberies, and being a hero. The Scorpion has the ability to talk to scorpions.

- Electro
- Sandman
- The Scorpion (Mac)
- The Vulture (Adrian)
- an unidentified fifth member
- Kraven the Hunter (former)
- The Shocker (Herman) (former)

== Video games ==
=== The Amazing Spider-Man ===
The game does not explicitly identify the game's antagonists as the Sinister Six, though all six of them have been members of the team in other media.

- Mysterio
- Hobgoblin
- Scorpion
- Rhino
- Doctor Octopus
- Venom

=== Spider-Man: Return of the Sinister Six ===
In the NES game Spider-Man: Return of the Sinister Six, the Sinister Six is featured with the same line-up as the story arc the game is named for.

- Doctor Octopus (leader)
- Electro
- Hobgoblin (Jason Macendale)
- Mysterio
- Sandman
- Vulture

=== Spider-Man 2: The Sinister Six ===
The Sinister Six are the primary enemies of the video game Spider-Man 2: The Sinister Six.

- Doctor Octopus (leader)
- Kraven the Hunter
- Mysterio
- Sandman
- Scorpion
- Vulture

=== Spider-Man vs. The Sinister Six ===
The Sinister Six are the main antagonists Spider-Man vs. The Sinister Six for MS-DOS.

- Chameleon
- Doctor Octopus
- Hobgoblin
- Mysterio
- Vulture
- Shocker

=== Spider-Man: Shattered Dimensions ===
The team went by The Ultimate Six, Norman Osborn's Six, and simply The Six.

- Green Goblin (Norman Osborn) (leader)
- Electro (Maxwell Dillon)
- Spider-Man (Peter Parker)

=== Spider-Man: Edge of Time ===
- Doctor Octopus (Otto Octavius) (leader)
- Kraven (Sergei Kravinoff)
- Mysterio (Quentin Beck)
- Sandman (William Baker)
- Electro (Max Dillon) (retired)
- Green Goblin (Norman Osborn) (retired)
- Vulture (Adrian Toomes) (retired)

=== Marvel: Avengers Alliance ===
The Sinister Six made their in-game debut as group during the level "Special Operations - Along Came the Spiders".

- Doctor Octopus (leader)
- Electro
- Kraven the Hunter
- Lizard
- Mysterio (Quentin Beck)
- Vulture (Adrian Toomes)
- Beetle (Janice Lincoln)

=== Marvel Super Hero Squad Online ===
Marvel Super Hero Squad Online was an MMO and card collecting game featuring the Sinister Six as the Sinister Syndicate.

- Dr. Octopus (Otto Octavius)
- Green Goblin (Norman Osborn)
- Kingpin (Wilson Fisk)
- Electro (Max Dillon)
- Lizard (Curtis Connors)
- Mysterio (Quentin Beck)
- Sandman (William Baker)
- Venom
- Carnage (Cletus Kasady)

=== Marvel Contest of Champions ===
- Doctor Octopus
- Vulture
- Green Goblin
- Iron Patriot
- Venom (former members)
- Mysterio (replacing Venom)
- Electro
- Rhino
- Kraven The Hunter
- Sandman
- Shocker
- Scorpion
- Lizard

=== Spider-Man Unlimited ===
A Multiverse Sinister Six, consisting of various members of themselves, invade dimensions to harvest the mineral ISO-8. They command an army of Sinister Soldiers. During updates, various villains appear, either aiding them or just joining in the battles, such as Jack O' Lantern, Hydro-Man, Silver Sable and Demogoblin. Superior Spider-Man was invited to the team, but declined.

Goblins

- Green Goblin (Norman Osborn)
- Gold Goblin (Norman Osborn)
- Grey Goblin (Gabriel Stacy)
- Menace (male version)
- House of M Goblin (Peter Parker)
- Green Gobbler (Norman Osbird)

Vultures

- Vulture (Adrian Toomes)
- Classic Vulture (Adrian Toomes)
- Ultimate Vulture (Blackie Drago)
- Red Vulture (Adrian Toomes)
- Dark Vulture (Adrian Toomes)

Electros

- Electro (Max Dillon)
- Ultimate Electro (Max Dillon)
- Modern Electro (Max Dillon)
- Pure Energy Electro (Max Dillon)
- Classic Electro (Max Dillon)

Sandmen

- Sandman (William Baker)
- Sandman Noir (Flint Marko)
- Classic Sandman (William Baker/"Flint Marko")
- Dark Sandman (William Baker)
- Pure Sand Sandman (William Baker)

Doctor Octopuses

- Doctor Octopus (Otto Octavius)
- Classic Doctor Octopus (Otto Octavius)
- Chapter One Doctor Octopus (Otto Octavius)
- Ultimate Doctor Octopus (Otto Octavius)
- Doctor Octopus Noir (Otto Octavius)

Mysterios

- Mysterio (Quentin Beck)
- Classic Mysterio (Quentin Beck)
- Mysterion
- Superior Mysterion
- Dark Mysterio (Quentin Beck)

The Sinister Six were also aided by autonomous robotic henchman, the "Sinister Soldiers", sometimes also known as "Portal Troops". Besides their base versions, they also came in Golden, 2099, Underwater, and Mysterio variants.

=== Marvel: Future Fight ===
A special mission features the Sinister Six in collaboration with A.I.M. This version, however, is led by Mysterio, who disguised himself as Doctor Octopus and tricks the other members, as well as A.I.M., to take control of the group and the A.I.M. faction in New York. It is unknown if the Vulture is an official member, but he assists the other villains against their fight with Spider-Man and his allies. In game, Electro does get the team tag, though Rhino does not, despite being in the event.

- Mysterio (leader, disguised as Doctor Octopus)
- Lizard
- Kraven the Hunter
- Sandman
- Rhino
- Vulture (Adrian Toomes)
- Electro (Maxwell Dillon)

=== Marvel's Spider-Man ===
This team was formed by Otto Octavius, after he loses control of himself due to the dysfunctional AI in his tentacles influencing him and his darkest thoughts. He breaks out Martin Li and other villains Spider-Man has defeated and put in jail, offering them their personal desires and outfitting them with gear in exchange for their help to get revenge on and expose Mayor Norman Osborn and his involvement in the creation of Devil's Breath.

- Doctor Octopus (Otto Octavius, leader)
- Mister Negative (Martin Li, second-in-command)
- Electro (Max Dillon)
- Vulture (Adrian Toomes)
- Rhino (Alexsei Sytsevich)
- Scorpion (Mac Gargan)

=== Marvel Ultimate Alliance 3: The Black Order ===
This team was formed at Ryker's Island by Norman Osborn, who has the hands of the Infinity Stone, following Star-Lord's attempt to separate the six stones from the hands of Thanos, which instead fell into other villains' hands on Earth. After gaining the Time Stone, Osborn released all villains who were imprisoned and recruit one of the supervillains to cause riot at the prison, with Otto Octavius as a second-in-command.

- Green Goblin (Norman Osborn, leader)
- Doctor Octopus (Otto Octavius, second in-command)
- Electro (Max Dillon)
- Venom (Eddie Brock)
- Sandman (Flint Marko)
- Mysterio (Quentin Beck)

=== Marvel Strike Force ===
Sinister Six

The Sinister Six has two further sub groups: the Insidious Six, and the Superior Six.

- Doctor Octopus (leader; Superior Six)
- Electro (Francine Frye)
- Green Goblin
- Green Goblin [Classic] (Superior Six)
- Hobgoblin (Insidious Six)
- Kraven the Hunter (Superior Six)
- Lizard (Superior Six)
- Mysterio
- Rhino
- Scorpion (Insidious Six)
- Shocker
- Spider-Slayer (Superior Six)
- Superior Spider-Man (Insidious Six, Superior Six)
- Swarm
- Vulture

Symbiote Six

- Knull
- Quicksilver [Symbiote]
- Riot
- Toxin
- Venom

== Board games ==
=== Marvel Champions: The Card Game ===
Players battle Marvel villains with unique teams of iconic heroes.

==== The Hood Scenario Pack ====
The Hood's budding criminal empire is swiftly becoming a formidable threat to the people of New York City. Under the Hood's rule, players encounter the Sinister Syndicate as an additional side scheme.

- Beetle
- Boomerang
- Shocker
- Speed Demon
- White Rabbit

==== Sinister Motives Expansion ====
In this expansion, players take on a rogues gallery of classic Spider-Man villains, the Sinister Six and their sinister schemes.

- Doctor Octopus
- Electro
- Hobgoblin
- Kraven the Hunter
- Scorpion
- Vulture

=== Sinister Six ===
Players play as the Sinister Six to pull off heists and escape Spider-Man and his friends, and come away with the most loot.

- Doctor Octopus
- Electro
- Green Goblin
- Kraven the Hunter
- Lizard
- Mysterio
- Rhino
- Sandman
- Venom
- Vulture

== Trading cards ==
=== Marvel Universe Cards ===
First released in 1990 with Series I, the Sinister Six first appear in the "Team Pictures" set. They appear again in 1993 in Series IV featured on the card 'Spider-Man vs Sinister Six'.

- Doctor Octopus
- Electro
- Hobgoblin
- Mysterio
- Sandman
- Vulture
