= Spider-Man Unlimited (comics) =

US comic book

Spider-Man Unlimited (vol. 1)
- Cover of Spider-Man Unlimited #1

Publication information
- Publisher: Marvel Comics
- Schedule: Quarterly
- Publication date: May 1993–November 1998
- No. of issues: 22
- Main character: Spider-Man

Creative team
- Written by: Various
- Artist: Various

Spider-Man Unlimited is the title of three comic book series published by Marvel Comics. The first series began in 1993 and was named in its indicia as Volume 1. It was set in the main Marvel Universe. The second series was based on the animated television series Spider-Man Unlimited, and was not set in the Marvel Universe. It is called Volume 2. The third series, which began in 2004, did not have a volume number listed and was also set in the main Marvel Universe.

== 1993 series (vol. 1) ==
Originally announced under the title Spider-Man Giant Size, the 1993 series was a quarterly series with double-length stories, which at the time was notable for being printed on glossy stock paper (a practice discontinued in later issues before being adopted by the entire Marvel line in the 2000s). Earlier issues played a part in Spider-Man crossovers; the first issue was the first part of "Maximum Carnage" and the second issue was the last part of "Maximum Carnage". Issues #7-14 formed part of the Clone Saga. Later in the series, the focus shifted to stand-alone stories. Ron Lim penciled the lead story in the first eight issues of the book. Most of the later issues were written by Christopher Golden and drawn by Joe Bennett.

=== Issue #1 ===
Spider-Man Unlimited #1 was published in May 1993. The issue credits are:

- Title: "Maximum Carnage Part 1"
- Editor: Danny Fingeroth
- Writers: Tom DeFalco, Mike W. Barr, Terry Kavanagh
- Pencils: Ron Lim, Jerry Bingham, Mark Bagley
- Inkers: Jim Sanders, III, Jerry Bingham, Tom Palmer

=== Plot ===
Cletus Kasady has been transferred from the Vault to Ravencroft for some tests. He there reveals that the alien symbiote which made him the supervillain Carnage infected his bloodstream before it died, allowing Kasady's metabolism to produce an imitation of the symbiote. Using this faux symbiote, he kills the guards and doctors. Carnage comes across a fellow Ravencroft inmate, Shriek, who persuades him to free her so she can join his killing spree.

Peter Parker and Mary Jane Watson are at the wake after Harry Osborn's funeral. J. Jonah Jameson thinks Spider-Man was responsible for Harry's downfall (as the Green Goblin). Peter is incredibly mixed up as he comforts Harry's wife Liz Allan. Mary Jane is upset from the whole Harry fallout and asks Peter to give up being Spider-Man, for a couple of weeks at least, so things can settle down. He agrees.

Out on the streets, Carnage is attacked by Spider-Man's doppelganger. Carnage ensnares and attempts to kill it, but Shriek stops him with a sonic blast and says she is adopting the doppelganger. Peter goes for a takeout and hears on the radio about Carnage's escape. He changes to Spider-Man and goes swinging off to find Carnage. He is attacked by Shriek and the doppelganger instead, who quickly defeat him. Spider-Man topples off a building into a back alley as the doppelganger and Shriek swing off.

Because Carnage used him as a hostage before, Jonah is immediately informed by the authorities of his escape. Jonah enters his Bugle office with plans to flee New York, only to find himself in a meeting with Carnage, who neglected to make an appointment.

== 1999 series (vol. 2) ==
Spider-Man Unlimited (vol. 2)

Publication information
- Publisher: Marvel Comics
- Schedule: Monthly
- Publication date: December 1999–April 2000
- No. of issues: 6
- Main character: Spider-Man

=== Spider-Man Unlimited Wizard Edition ===
Spider-Man Unlimited Wizard Edition is a Marvel comic book series that was printed in 1999, and told the story of Spider-Man's new adventures in the Spider-Man Unlimited television series. In this storyline, Spider-Man sports a new costume - one similar to that worn by Ben Reilly and May "Mayday" Parker - made using nanotechnology "discretely borrowed" from Reed Richards. In this series, Spider-Man also confronts a species known as the Bestials: monsters created by the High Evolutionary which rule a planet called Counter-Earth and outnumber the planet's human population.

=== Issues #1/2, 1 and 2 ===
Peter Parker meets with J. Jonah Jameson to take picture of his son, astronaut John Jameson, before a space mission to a hidden planet on the other side of the Sun called Counter-Earth, but it is quickly revealed that Venom and Carnage have joined forces in a plot against the space mission. Following the two to the launch site, Spider-Man attempts to thwart their plot, but fails.

Blamed for Jameson losing contact with Earth after the battle with the two symbiotes, Spider-Man becomes a target of persecution by the media and the public. This causes Peter to temporarily retire from his life as Spider-Man. After a brief hiatus, Peter Parker decides to board a new spaceship on a flight to Counter-Earth and save John.

The first three issues, the first of which is a half-issue, are based on the first three episodes of the television series.

=== Issue #3 ===
In issue #3, Peter is assigned by the Daily Byte to follow the Counter-Earth version of Reed Richards. It is suspected that Reed has knowledge of a mysterious creature called the Brute. The only thing Peter finds out is that Richards is a really uptight individual. Together, they go to a party which requires everyone to have ID chips. Before Peter is discovered not to have one, the Brute shows up to crash the party. After a fight between Spider-Man and the Brute, it is revealed to him that the creature is none other than Reed Richards. The Brute is helping the rebels against the Beastials; as Reed, he is a spy. He is also aided in his mission by his friend Ben Grimm. Reed reveals that, after a tested flight similar to the one which created the Fantastic Four, the Counter-Earth Reed was transformed by cosmic rays into the Brute, while Ben Grimm was unaffected, Johnny Storm was killed and Susan Richards was left in a coma.

=== Issue #4 ===
Peter decides to take a look at life outside the city after Naoko Jones is hesitant to tell him what lies beyond Manhattan; as Spider-Man, he asks the Green Goblin for help in leaving the island, which the Goblin only grants after Spider-Man tells him that he does not have the sub-dermal ID chip with which the High Evolutionary tracks human residents. As soon as he reaches the other side of an exit tunnel, he is dragged into the water by a tentacled creature; when he reawakens, he finds himself in a tree house in a hidden forest refuge known as "Harmony", where humans and Beastials live together. However, his stay is short-lived when he raises the ire of one of the human leaders of the area, a man named Brixton, and he barely escapes from what suddenly turns out to be a police state when he stumbles on a human Gwen Stacy double; she assists him by secretly housing him and then guiding him to the tunnel back to Manhattan.

=== Issue #5 ===
Peter Parker and Naoko Jones finally succeed in putting her son Shayne to sleep after he was hiding from the mysterious serial killer that was lurking on the streets. This mysterious serial killer was attacking people and viciously removing their subdermal ID chips.

Later, Peter notices a picture of Naoko, Shayne and Naoko's husband, who is a decorated soldier. Suddenly, Peter's spider sense alerts him to danger outside the house, where he encounters another of the killer's victims, who looks like a Wolverine Beastial.

After an enormous fight, the Wolverine Beastial and Spider-Man stopped fighting, after which they started to talk things out, until they noticed a robber kidnapping Naoko.

They followed the robber with the Wolverine Beastial's sense of smell and easily found him. They teamed up and started to fight the robber, who then transforms into a lizard-like Beastial and calls himself "the Chameleon from Counter-Earth".

After beating the Chameleon, the Wolverine Beastial said that this neighborhood is not his home any more and gave Spider-Man a medal that looks just like the one that Naoko's husband wore in the picture, which confirmed that the Wolverine Beastial is Shayne's father and Naoko's missing husband.

== 2004 series (vol. 3) ==
Spider-Man Unlimited (vol. 3)
- Cover of Spider-Man Unlimited (vol. 3) #3

Publication information
- Publisher: Marvel Comics
- Schedule: Bimonthly
- Format: Anthology
- Publication date: March 2004–May 2006
- No. of issues: 15
- Main character: Spider-Man

Creative team
- Written by: Various
- Artist: Various

The third series, launched concurrently with X-Men Unlimited (vol. 2), was a bimonthly anthology featuring two stories per issue, usually by writers without a significant body of previously published comics work.

== Collected editions ==
- Spider-Man: Maximum Carnage (contains Spider-Man Unlimited #1-2)
- Spider-Man: The Complete Clone Saga Epic Book 1 (contains Spider-Man Unlimited #7)
- Spider-Man: The Complete Clone Saga Epic Book 2 (contains Spider-Man Unlimited #8)
- Spider-Man: The Complete Clone Saga Epic Book 3 (contains Spider-Man Unlimited #9)
- Spider-Man: The Complete Clone Saga Epic Book 5 (contains Spider-Man Unlimited #10)
- Spider-Man: The Complete Ben Reilly Epic Book 1 (contains Scarlet Spider Unlimited #1)
- Spider-Man: The Complete Ben Reilly Epic Book 3 (contains Spider-Man Unlimited #11)
- Spider-Man: The Complete Ben Reilly Epic Book 4 (contains Spider-Man Unlimited #12)
- Spider-Man: The Complete Ben Reilly Epic Book 5 (contains Spider-Man Unlimited #13)
- Spider-Man: The Complete Ben Reilly Epic Book 6 (contains Spider-Man Unlimited #14)
