= Mighty Muggs =

Toy line made by Hasbro

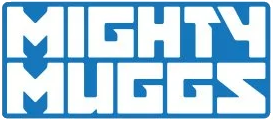
- Type: Figurine
- Company: Hasbro
- Country: United States
- Availability: 2008–2017
- Materials: Vinyl–plastic
- Features: Characters from franchises: Star Wars; Marvel Comics; Indiana Jones; G.I. Joe; Transformers

Mighty Muggs are a brand of vinyl–plastic collectible toy series made by Hasbro. The figurines resemble super deformed versions of characters from the following franchises: Star Wars, Marvel Comics, Indiana Jones, G.I. Joe, and Transformers.

There is a line of smaller figures, called "Mini Muggs", as well as blank Mighty Muggs for customization. The line was commercially dormant for a few years, but certain retailers received exclusive 'continuation' lines. Comic-Con International 2011 had an exclusive Avengers line.

In 2017, Hasbro announced the return of Star Wars, Marvel & Transformers-themed Mighty Muggs for release in 2018.

== Figures ==
=== Star Wars ===
- Wave 1
  - Boba Fett
  - Chewbacca with bowcaster
  - Darth Maul with red double-sided lightsaber
  - Darth Vader with red lightsaber
  - Han Solo with gun
  - Stormtrooper with gun
- Wave 2
  - C-3PO
  - Luke Skywalker with blue lightsaber
  - Mace Windu with purple lightsaber
  - Obi-Wan Kenobi (from Revenge of the Sith) with blue lightsaber
- Wave 3
  - Clone Commander Cody with gun
  - Jango Fett with two guns
  - Lando Calrissian with cape
  - Princess Leia with gun
- Wave 4
  - Palpatine with force lightning bolt
  - General Grievous with blue and green lightsabers
  - Luke Skywalker (in Cloud City attire from The Empire Strikes Back) with blue lightsaber
  - Yoda with green lightsaber
- Wave 5
  - Anakin Skywalker (from The Clone Wars) with blue lightsaber
  - Asajj Ventress with two red lightsabers
  - Captain Rex with two guns
  - Count Dooku with red lightsaber and force lightning bolt
- Wave 6
  - Helmetless Darth Vader with red lightsaber
  - Grand Moff Tarkin
  - Han Solo (in Hoth attire from The Empire Strikes Back) with gun
  - Plo Koon with blue lightsaber
- Wave 7
  - Shirtless Darth Maul with red double-sided lightsaber
  - Darth Revan with red lightsaber

After Wave 7, the line was discontinued, but two waves were made available through online exclusive waves:

- Wave 8
  - Qui-Gon Jinn with green lightsaber
  - Royal Guard with staff
  - Wampa with bone and detachable arm
  - Wicket with spear
- Wave 9
  - Gamorrean Guard with axe
  - Luke Skywalker (in Hoth attire from Episode V) with blue lightsaber
  - Obi-Wan Kenobi (from Episode IV) with blue lightsaber
  - Scout Trooper with gun
- Exclusive
  - Commander Gree with gun (Comic Con 2008)
  - Admiral Ackbar (Previews Exclusive, 2008)
  - Shadow Trooper with gun (Previews Exclusive, 2008)
  - Biggs Darklighter (Target – March 2009)
  - Bossk (Target – March 2009)
  - Shock Trooper (Target – March 2009)
  - Snow Trooper (Target – March 2009)
  - Teebo (Target – March 2009)
- Mini Muggs
  - Original Trilogy 3 Pack: Darth Vader, Yoda & Stormtrooper (Target – Oct 2010)
  - Bounty Hunter 3 Pack: Bossk, Boba Fett & IG-88 (Target – Oct 2010)
  - Clone Wars 3 Pack: Cad Bane, General Grievous & Captain Rex (Target – Oct 2010)

=== Marvel Universe ===
- Wave 1
  - Iron Man
  - Spider-Man
  - Venom
  - Wolverine
- Wave 2
  - Captain America with shield
  - Doctor Doom
  - Hulk
  - Thing
- Wave 3
  - Doc Ock
  - Ghost Rider
  - Spider-Man (in black costume)
  - Thor with Mjolnir
- Wave 4
  - Galactus
  - Human Torch
  - Silver Surfer with surfboard
- Wave 5
  - Ultimate Captain America with shield
  - Iron Man (Mark I armor)
  - Skrull
  - Vision with cape
- Wave 6 (not available through "big-box" retail outlets)
  - Cyclops
  - Logan with cowboy hat
  - Sabretooth
  - Phoenix
- Iron Man 2 Movie Wave
  - Iron Man Mark VI
  - War Machine
- Exclusive
  - Movie Iron Man (Comic Con 2008)
  - Peter Parker with Spider-sense face (Comic Con 2008)
  - Red Skull (Previews Exclusive 2008)
  - Thanos (Previews Exclusive 2008)
  - Jigsaw with gun (Toys 'R' Us - December 2008)
  - Punisher with gun (Toys 'R' Us - December 2008)
  - Wolverine with retractable claws (Comic Con 2009)
  - Iron Man Mark VI with Flip up visor (Comic Con 2010)
  - Spider-Man with removable cloth mask (Comic Con 2011)
- Mini Muggs
  - Avengers 5-pack: Captain America, Thor, Iron Man, Hulk, and Giant-Man (traditional Mighty Muggs size) (Comic Con 2011)
  - Maximum Carnage 5-pack: Spider-Man, Carnage, Venom, J. Jonah Jameson, and Demogoblin (New York Comic Con 2011)
  - Avengers 2-Packs
    - Captain America vs Red Skull
    - Hulk vs Abomination
    - Thor vs Loki
    - Iron Man (Silver Centurion Armor) vs Iron Monger
  - The Avengers Movie Wave
    - Captain America
    - Iron Man
    - Hulk
    - Thor
    - Hawkeye
    - Nick Fury
  - Micro Muggs
    - Iron Man 3 Blind Box
      - Wave 1
        - Mark XLII Armor
        - Mark V Armor
        - Tony Stark
        - Mark IV (no mask)
        - Mark XV Armor "Sneaky"
        - Mark XVI Armor "Nightclub"
        - Mark XVII Armor "Heartbreaker"
        - Mark XXXVII Armor "Hammerhead"
        - Mark XXXIX Armor "Gemini"
        - Mark XLI Armor "Bones"
        - War Machine Mark II
        - Hammer Drone
      - Wave 2
        - Mark I Armor
        - Mark VII Armor
        - Mark XXV Armor "Striker"
        - Mark XXXIII Armor "Silver Centurion"
        - Mark XXXV Armor "Red Snapper"
        - Iron Patriot
        - Mark VI Armor Hologram
        - Iron Monger
        - Ivan Vanko
        - Bleeding Edge Armor
        - Hulkbuster Armor
    - The Avengers 4-pack
      - Captain America
      - Hulk
      - Iron Man
      - Thor
    - Avengers Assemble Blind Box
      - Wave 1
        - Nick Fury
        - Captain America
        - Hawkeye
        - Hulk
        - Thor
        - Iron Man
        - Kang
        - Ultron
        - Red Skull
        - Loki
        - World War II Captain America
        - M.O.D.O.K

=== Indiana Jones ===
- Wave 1
  - Cairo Swordsman with scimitar
  - Indiana Jones with dark brown hat and whip
  - Mola Ram with fiery heart
- Wave 2
  - Henry Jones
  - Monkey Man with monkey
  - Mutt Williams with sword
- Exclusive
  - Fertility Idol (Comic Con 2008)
  - Sallah (Entertainment Earth 2008)
  - Short Round (Entertainment Earth 2008)

Un-produced figures for the Indiana Jones line include Spalko (Crystal Skull), Saitpo & Toht (Raiders of the Lost Ark), and three versions of Indiana Jones: College Professor, White Tuxedo (Temple of Doom), and Young Boy Scout (The Last Crusade).

=== G.I. Joe ===
- Wave 1
  - Cobra Commander with gun and cape
  - Duke with gun
  - Snake Eyes with gun and sword
  - Storm Shadow with sword
- Wave 2
  - Baroness with gun
  - Destro with gun
- Wave 3 (Wave Cancelled)
  - Serpentor with gun and cape
  - Cobra Trooper with gun
  - Shipwreck with parrot
  - Zartan with gun

=== Transformers Universe ===
- Wave 1
  - Bumblebee
  - Megatron with arm cannon
  - Optimus Prime with cannon
  - Soundwave with gun
- Wave 2
  - Grimlock with sword
  - Starscream with removable wings
- Wave 3 (January 2010)
  - Bumblebee (Movie version)
  - Jazz with gun and removable wings
  - Optimus Prime (Movie version)
  - Shockwave with gun
- Exclusives
  - Optimus Prime with cannon (glossy repaint) - San Diego Comic-Con 2009 Exclusive
  - Prowl with gun and removable wings - San Diego Comic-Con 2010 Exclusive
- Unproduced
  - Ironhide

=== 2018 ===
- January, Star Wars & Marvel (These switch between three different facial expressions when you press down on the heads.)
  - Darth Vader
  - Princess Leia Organa
  - Luke Skywalker
  - Rey
  - Kylo Ren
  - Black Widow
  - Spider-Man
  - Groot
  - Star-Lord
  - Captain America
  - Hulk
