= Spider-Man and Venom: Maximum Carnage =

1994 video game

- North American SNES box art
- Developer: Software Creations
- Publisher: Acclaim Entertainment (Note: Released under the LJN brand name on the SNES.)
- Producers: John Pickford; Mark Flitman
- Designer: Chun Wah Kong
- Programmer: Paul Murray
- Composers: Super NES; Chris Jojo; Green Jellÿ; Genesis/Mega Drive; Tony Williams; Paul Tonge
- Series: Spider-Man
- Platforms: Genesis/Mega Drive, Super NES
- Release: Genesis/Mega Drive: NA/EU: September 16, 1994; JP: May 26, 1995; Super NES: NA/EU: September 16, 1994
- Genre: Beat 'em up
- Mode: Single-player

Spider-Man and Venom: Maximum Carnage is a 1994 beat 'em up video game developed by Software Creations and published by Acclaim Entertainment and its subsidiary LJN for the Super Nintendo Entertainment System and Sega Genesis. The game, based on the comic book story arc of the same name, features numerous heroes, including Spider-Man, Venom, and their allies from the Marvel Comics fictional universe like Captain America, Black Cat, Iron Fist, Cloak and Dagger, Deathlok, Morbius and Firestar, all teaming up to battle an onslaught of villains led by Carnage, including Shriek, Doppelganger, Demogoblin and Carrion.

The game received mixed reviews upon its release, but in later years, reviews have been more positive and it is regarded as one of the better Spider-Man games in the 16-bit era. It was followed by the sequel Venom/Spider-Man: Separation Anxiety in 1995. Both versions of the game were re-released on the compilation Marvel MaXimum Collection on 2026.

== Plot ==
Eddie Brock is proven innocent after being in jail for a while, and promises to not use the Venom symbiote for evil. While leaving prison, the symbiote bonds to Brock's former cellmate, Cletus Kasady. Later, Spider-Man meets Venom and asks him if his promise to do good was true, but Brock says he is still thinking about it, angering Spider-Man. The two fight, with the showdown being broken up by Kasady, who has become Carnage via the symbiote. Brock, desperate to stop Carnage, attempts to attack him, but the two are evenly matched and Carnage manages to escape into the city. Spider-Man and Venom vow to stop Carnage, despite their rivalry. In the city, Carnage begins a criminal empire in the sewers, and hires Shriek as his second in command. Hobgoblin attempts to join, but is rejected by Carnage, causing him to gain demonic power and become Demogoblin, who Carnage hires. Later, Carnage finds a six-armed reproduction of Spider-Man called Doppelganger, who he manages to employ after restraining him. Finally, Carnage finds the degrading clone of Jackal named Carrion, who he hires as the final part of his team. Carnage then attacks New York with his team, causing Venom and Spider-Man to almost be killed when they confront them. Spider-Man and Venom retreat, but create a "resistance" out of his previous allies, who they finally confront Carnage with. Despite the power of his team, Carnage is defeated after an epic battle, retreating into the sewers. Spider-Man thanks Venom, saying he hopes he will work with him in the future, but Venom retreats before replying. Meanwhile, the Carnage symbiote escapes the scene.

== Gameplay ==
In this single-player side-scrolling beat 'em up (with a format similar to Double Dragon and Final Fight), the player controls Spider-Man and Venom through various levels to stop the supervillain Carnage and his team, as well as hundreds of criminals they inspire in their wake, from taking over the city. The two 16-bit versions are virtually identical.

One of the game's comic-styled cutscenes. This one is based on the final panel of Spider-Man Unlimited #1.

Other Marvel heroes can be summoned by collecting appropriate items hidden within certain levels. The locations of the power-ups necessary to summon aid are set. Depending on which character summoned them, the summoned heroes may help out in different ways, usually being more effective for whichever character (Spider-Man or Venom) they favor.

== Development ==
Maximum Carnage is one of the first video games to be directly based on a comic book story, rather than simply using comics characters in a standard video game "action/adventure" plot. Many of the game's cutscenes feature semi-animated versions of art taken directly from the comics. It was also the first Spider-Man video game to receive a teen rating (while the SNES re-release version had a rating of K-A, the Genesis version was rated MA-13). The game is notable for its red-colored cartridge, being the only official Sega Genesis game with a non-black cartridge and one of three SNES games with a non-grey cartridge, the others being Doom (which was also red) and Killer Instinct (which was black).

The game's soundtrack was written and produced by American rock group Green Jellÿ. The title screen theme song appears as the first track on the band's 1994 album 333 as "Carnage Rules". Due to the limited storage capacity of SNES and Genesis cartridges, the soundtrack was not recorded music, but a computerized rendition of the songs. Additionally, an uncredited version of Black Sabbath's "The Mob Rules" appears in the soundtrack, during the boss battles against the supervillains.

== Reception ==
Reception

Aggregate score
Aggregator	Score
GameRankings	66.33% (SNES); 80% (Genesis)

Review score
Publication	Score
Electronic Gaming Monthly	5/10, 5/10, 5/10, 5/10, 5/10 (SNES)

The game received "mixed or average" and "generally favorable" reviews. The reviewers of Electronic Gaming Monthly scored the SNES version a unanimous 5 out of 10, commenting that the appearances by other superheroes are "cool", but outweighed by the "sloppy" graphics and mediocre control. The SNES version was also given a 3.45/5 from Nintendo Power. Reviewing the Genesis port, GamePro commented that "all the graphics, features, and fighting action are identical on the Genesis version—unfortunately, so are the drawbacks that made this only an average SNES game". They elaborated that the game controls well but is overly long and repetitive due to the player character's limited selection of moves, the lack of objects to interact with, the low variety of enemies, and the similar look to all the backgrounds.

Overall, critical reception of the game remarkably improved as the game received a cult following over later years, where it was praised for its inspired soundtrack, its faithful comic book adapting and the challenging difficulty, as well as the ability to switch between Spider-Man and Venom, as many called it "one of the best beat'em up games".

IGN gave the game a positive review, where they listed the game 85th in their list of the "Top 100 SNES games of all time". In 2013, Arcade Sushi ranked the game eighth on their list of the "10 Best Retro Beat 'em Ups". In 2018, Complex rated the game 63rd on their list of "The Best Super Nintendo Games of All Time".

Comic book website CBR.com has given a more positive review about the game, calling it "the superhero game that changed and revolutionized the beat'em up genre and the superhero genre in a positive way, and becoming one of the great beat 'em up games of its era".
