= Carrion (comics) =

Marvel Comics character

- Interior artwork from Spider-Man: The Jackal Files vol. 1, 1 (August 1994 Marvel Comics); Art by Guy Dorian

Publication information
- Publisher: Marvel Comics
- First appearance: As Miles Warren's clone: Spectacular Spider-Man #25 (December 1978); As Malcolm McBride: Spectacular Spider-Man #149 (April 1989); As William Allen: Spider-Man: Dead Man's Hand (April 1997)
- Created by: Bill Mantlo; Jim Mooney; Frank Springer

In-story information
- Alter ego: Miles Warren (clone); Malcolm McBride; William Allen
- Place of origin: New York
- Team affiliations: Carnage Family/Maximum Carnage (as Malcolm McBride); S.H.I.E.L.D. (as William Allen)
- Partnerships: As Malcolm McBride; Shriek; Carnage; Doppelganger; Demogoblin
- Notable aliases: Miles Warren; Malcolm McBride; William Allen
- Abilities: Telepathy; Levitation; Density control Ability to disintegrate organic matter at a touch

Carrion is a supervillain appearing in American comic books published by Marvel Comics. The character is usually depicted as an enemy of Spider-Man.

== Publication history ==
The Miles Warren clone version of Carrion first appeared in The Spectacular Spider-Man #25 and was created by Bill Mantlo, Jim Mooney, and Frank Springer. Carrion emerged as part of a storyline that was a sequel to the original Clone Saga and as a result he has one of the most complicated histories of any Spider-Man villain.

According to Jenny Blake Isabella, in Mantlo's original plans for the story, Carrion would have been revealed as the Peter Parker clone using the discarded gear of the then-deceased Green Goblin. Marv Wolfman, then writer of The Amazing Spider-Man book, had second thoughts. He decided he did not want a second Spider-Man running around, so Bill Mantlo was asked to change the planned revelation of his extended story even though the first chapter had already been published.

The character's history has been retconned several times as successive writers changed the status of the various clones, the plans and motivations of Miles Warren, and other aspects from the stories. Often these changes took place in stories which did not directly involve Carrion, resulting in further stories trying to tie up gaps. Three separate incarnations of the character have appeared.

William Allen first appeared in Spider-Man: Dead Man's Hand #1 (April 1997), created by Roger Stern and Dan Lawlis. McBride was created by Sal Buscema and Gerry Conway in The Spectacular Spider-Man #149 (April 1989).

== Fictional character biography ==
=== Miles Warren clone ===
The original Carrion first appears seeking to destroy Spider-Man, somehow knowing his secret identity as Peter Parker. He unsuccessfully approaches the Maggia with a plan to kill Spider-Man. Carrion attacks Peter Parker, blaming him for the death of Gwen Stacy.

Carrion seeks to destroy Spider-Man several times before capturing him and revealing himself to be a decayed clone of Miles Warren, also known as the Jackal. Warren had created the clone and left it in a capsule to mature to full development. However, Warren seemingly died and the clone was left alone in the capsule. Something went wrong and the clone's body became like a living corpse. Carrion blamed Spider-Man for the deaths of both Warren and Gwen Stacy and sought to bring him to justice with the help of Randy Vale, a student who he manipulated into helping him. Carrion captures Peter Parker and prepares to kill him with a giant "Spider-Amoeba" created using Peter's genetic material. In the subsequent fight, a fire breaks out in the laboratory. The Spider-Amoeba suffocates Carrion to death before dying in the fire.

=== Malcolm McBride ===
Many years later, Spider-Man learns from the High Evolutionary that Miles Warren had not achieved cloning but had instead created a genetic virus that could transform humans into genetic duplicates of other people. Spider-Man searches through Warren's laboratory and is followed by his university research student rival Malcolm McBride, who discovers a test tube containing a strange substance. The substance consumes McBride, turning him into a second incarnation of Carrion who possesses the knowledge and powers of the first Carrion.

Initially, Carrion believes himself to be another clone of Warren, but McBride's memories and personality begin resurfacing in his mind. Carrion joins forces with the Hobgoblin against Spider-Man and later sacrifices himself to save McBride's mother. Carrion turns up alive again, and works with Carnage, Doppelganger, Demogoblin, and Shriek on a killing spree across New York City. The mentally unstable Shriek begins viewing Carrion and the others as her and Carnage's "sons". The villains are defeated and confined to the Ravencroft mental institution.

Shriek attempts to dominate Carrion even further and encourages him to destroy all aspects of Malcolm McBride's life. However, McBride's mother is able to reach her son's true identity. Carrion is driven to despair and attempts to turn the Carrion virus upon himself, only to be cured by Shriek. McBride is returned to Ravencroft.

=== William Allen ===
Following the death of Jackal, his corpse is examined by agents of S.H.I.E.L.D. Dr. William Allen ignores safety protocols and in the process is infected by a new, stronger version of the Carrion virus, transforming him into the third Carrion. He exhibits the additional ability to use a "zombie plague" to control the minds of others, but is plagued by Miles Warren's mind, which threatens to overtake his body. As Carrion seeks to infect the city with the Red Dust plague, Spider-Man confronts the High Evolutionary, who confirms that he had deliberately sought to distort Warren's achievements by faking the journals and evidence to make it seem that Warren had never achieved true cloning. Spider-Man discovers Warren's old notes, which are used to generate a cure to the Red Dust, while he confronts Carrion. It is revealed that the original Carrion had indeed been a clone of Warren, created to incubate a virus to destroy humanity, but it had been released too early and failed in its mission. Spider-Man subdues the new Carrion, who is taken into S.H.I.E.L.D. custody and placed in stasis.

Carrion later appears as a member of the Shadow Council's incarnation of the Masters of Evil.

=== Sentient virus ===
A new version of Carrion, engineered by Jackal, ran rampant through New York, jumping between host bodies. After being pursued across the city by Superior Spider-Man (Doctor Octopus' mind in Peter Parker's body), the Carrion virus takes control of Hyperion's body. After a brief battle with the Avengers, the Carrion virus is apparently destroyed. However, it is able to regenerate itself and return to its creator.

During the Dead No More: The Clone Conspiracy storyline, Kaine Parker and Spider-Woman of Earth-65 rescue Spider-Man from Jackal. Kaine reveals to Spider-Man that he and Spider-Woman of Earth-65 came to this world to assist Spider-Man because they saw that apparently Spider-Man allying with the Jackal's offer on other worlds results in a global disaster caused by the Carrion virus. Doctor Octopus pulls a switch which activates the Carrion virus in all of the clones and causes them to start rapidly decaying. Spider-Man hacks into the Webware Emergency System and sends out a signal that stops some of the clones from decaying.

== Powers and abilities ==
The creature called Carrion is created when a genetic replicator virus derived from the mutated DNA of Professor Miles Warren comes into contact with a human being. The original Carrion had superhuman strength and durability, and could reduce the density of his body to become virtually intangible. He could disintegrate organic matter to ash just by touching it. He also had the powers of telepathy, self-levitation, and telekinesis of organic matter. Carrion also developed a chemical substance called Red Dust which can either render a victim unconscious, or act as a corrosive acid that can burn through flesh, metal, and other substances. Carrion has access to the scientific equipment used by Miles Warren in his "cloning" experiments.

Malcolm McBride, as Carrion, apparently had access to the same set of powers as the original, but had not yet taken the time to explore and hone his powers to the extent of his predecessor. He had not yet demonstrated the ability to become intangible or use telekinesis, and merely has a sense of intuition bordering on telepathy.

The sentient Carrion virus is able to infect and control victims without altering their bodies, allowing it to hide within them. If allowed to remain in one body long enough, it will be permanently bonded to it. The virus is resilient enough to reform itself after near-destruction. It can assume a bodily form of its own, one which resembles the previous Carrions. In this form, it can create a vapor that, when breathed in, allows him to control minds.

== Other versions ==
Malcom McBride appears in Spider-Man: Heroes & Villains.

== In other media ==
- The Malcolm McBride incarnation of Carrion appears in Spider-Man and Venom: Maximum Carnage as an associate of Carnage.
- Two original incarnations of Carrion, Stanley Carter and his uncle Emory Carter, appear in the novel Spider-Man: Requiem, by Jeff Mariotte.
