= Demogoblin =

Fictional character from Marvel Comics

- Demogoblin. Art by Tom Lyle.

Publication information
- Publisher: Marvel Comics
- First appearance: As Hobgoblin: Spectacular Spider-Man #147 (February 1989); As Demogoblin: Web of Spider-Man #86 (March 1992)
- Created by: Gerry Conway; Sal Buscema

In-story information
- Species: Demon
- Place of origin: Limbo
- Team affiliations: Carnage Family/Maximum Carnage
- Partnerships: Shriek; Carnage; Doppelganger; Carrion
- Notable aliases: Hobgoblin/Jason Philip Macendale Jr. (original host form)
- Abilities: Superhuman strength, agility, stamina, reflexes and resistance to injury High-level intellect Hellfire projection Skills and memories retained from original host Use of magical glider and weaponry

Demogoblin is a fictional character appearing in American comic books published by Marvel Comics. The character is a darker, mystical version of the Hobgoblin persona. Demogoblin is a demon and a self-proclaimed servant of the Lord. He seeks redemption for his own sins by exterminating other demons and by destroying evil wherever he finds it.

== Publication history ==
Demogoblin first appeared as Demogoblin in Web of Spider-Man #86 (March 1992), and had previously appeared as an unnamed demon in Spectacular Spider-Man #147.

== Fictional character biography ==
Demogoblin was originally an unnamed demon who inhabited Limbo and was banished there eons ago for unknown reasons. His essence was fused with the Hobgoblin (Jason Macendale) when Macendale asked N'astirh for more power in exchange for his soul. Hobgoblin quickly realizes the downsides of his powers and expels his demon half. This creates the Demogoblin, a darker, mystical version of the Hobgoblin persona.

Demogoblin believes himself to be on a holy mission and kills everyone whom he deems a sinner; however, his definition of a sinner is extreme and excludes only children. He often tries to kill heroes and even holy men. He claims that he is a member of a demonic group known as the "Righteous"—demons who seek redemption for their sins as self-proclaimed servants of the Lord by exterminating other demons and destroying evil wherever they find it.

During the events of "Maximum Carnage", Demogoblin joins Carnage, Shriek, Carrion, and Doppelganger on their killing spree throughout Manhattan. He battles Spider-Man, Venom, Iron Fist, Captain America, Deathlok, Cloak and Dagger, and Firestar. He ultimately becomes repulsed by his comrades' internal feuding and decides to leave them, but is apprehended before he can make good on this decision.

Demogoblin's physical form is killed in a showdown with Hobgoblin, who has gained greater strength than before. He dies trying to save a child from collapsing debris inside a church, where he is crushed to death.

Demogoblin returns in the "Absolute Carnage" event as "Demagoblin", bound to the recently killed Shriek.

== Powers and abilities ==
Demogoblin is a demonic being with numerous supernatural powers granted by magic. He is endowed with superhuman strength, stamina, agility, reflexes, and resistance to injury. He has a magical ability to mentally control and levitate a miniature "goblin glider" composed of hellfire and propel it at high speeds. He can project hellfire from his hands. He can also summon demons from hell that will attack anyone he instructs to be destroyed.

Demogoblin is able to mystically create "pumpkin bombs", similar to those of the Green Goblin or Hobgoblin. Orange pumpkin bombs explode conventionally as concussion and incendiary Jack O' Lanterns while black pumpkin bombs cause their target to be overwhelmed by massive feelings of despair and helplessness. He also can create wraith-shaped smoke and gas-emitting bombs, and bat-shaped razor-edged throwing blades.

== Reception ==
In 2020, CBR ranked Demogoblin 4th in their "10 Most Powerful Comic Book Villains With Demonic Origins" list.

== Other versions ==
=== Ultimate Marvel ===
In the Ultimate Marvel universe (Earth-1610), Mary Jane Watson becomes the Demogoblin after being kidnapped by Kaine Parker. Kaine injects Mary Jane with OZ, the drug that gave Spider-Man and Green Goblin their powers, transforming her into a horned goblin-like creature. However, when Spider-Man and Spider-Woman appear to rescue her, Mary Jane calms down and returns to her human form. Mary Jane is given a cure to the OZ formula, but is left traumatized and worries that she may transform again.

=== Spider-Geddon ===
An alternate universe version of Demogoblin from Earth-11580 appears in Spider-Geddon.

== In other media ==
=== Video games ===
- Demogoblin appears as a boss in Spider-Man and Venom: Maximum Carnage.
- Demogoblin appears in the handheld version of Lego Marvel Super Heroes.
- Demogoblin appears as a boss in Spider-Man Unlimited.

=== Merchandise ===
- Hasbro released a Demogoblin figure for their Spider-Man: Origins toy line in 2007. This figure was a repaint of a previously released Hobgoblin figure.
- In 2011, Hasbro released a Mini Muggs figure of Demogoblin, which was exclusively available at the 2011 New York Comic Con.
- Hasbro released Demogoblin as the Build-A-Figure for a 2020 Marvel Legends wave.
- Wizkids released a Demogoblin figure as part of their Amazing Spider-Man HeroClix set.
