= Cletus Kasady =

Marvel Comics fictional character

- Cletus Kasady as he appeared prior to becoming Carnage, in Absolute Carnage #5 (November 2019). Art by Ryan Stegman.

Publication information
- Publisher: Marvel Comics
- First appearance: The Amazing Spider-Man #344 (March 1991)
- Created by: David Michelinie (writer); Erik Larsen (artist)

In-story information
- Full name: Cletus Cortland Kasady
- Species: Human
- Team affiliations: Carnage Family; Astonishing Avengers; Poisons; Symbiote Imperium
- Partnerships: Shriek; Demogoblin; Doppelganger; Carrion
- Notable aliases: Carnage; The Red Slayer; Poison Carnage; Prophet of the Void
- Abilities: Alien symbiote grants: All powers of the progenitor's first human host, Spider-Man; Limited shapeshifting and camouflage; Symbiote's autonomous defense capabilities; Undetectable by Spider-Man's spider-sense

Cletus Cortland Kasady is a supervillain appearing in American comic books published by Marvel Comics. Created by writer David Michelinie and artist Erik Larsen, the character first appeared in The Amazing Spider-Man #344 (March 1991) as the first and most infamous host of the Carnage symbiote, an offspring of Venom.

A deranged serial killer, Kasady bonded with the Carnage symbiote while sharing a cell with Venom's human host, Eddie Brock, and broke out of prison using the super-human abilities granted by it. Since then, he went on to menace both Venom and Spider-Man, resulting in various unlikely alliances between the two to defeat him. Kasady and Carnage are a perfect match, as they both have sadistic personalities, and the symbiote only increases Kasady's already existent violent tendencies. After separating from the symbiote following the events of Absolute Carnage, Kasady nonetheless continued calling himself Carnage, bonding with the Extrembiote symbiote as his new primary symbiote avatar.

Since his introduction in comics, the character has been adapted into several other forms of media, including television series and video games. Woody Harrelson portrayed Cletus Kasady in the live-action Sony's Spider-Man Universe (SSU) films Venom (2018) and Venom: Let There Be Carnage (2021), bonding with Carnage in the latter film. In 2009, Kasady was ranked as IGN's 90th Greatest Comic Book Villain of All Time.

== Publication history ==
Writer David Michelinie intended to have Venom's human alter ego, Eddie Brock, be killed off in The Amazing Spider-Man #400 and have the symbiote continue to bond with a series of hosts. However, as Brock and Venom's popularity increased, Marvel would not allow him to be killed. Michelinie decided to create a new character: a total psychopath who, unlike Venom, had no sense of morality. The human component of Carnage's first host, Cletus Kasady, was designed by artist Erik Larsen, who modeled the character after the DC Comics supervillain the Joker.

Kasady was introduced in The Amazing Spider-Man #344 and first appeared as Carnage in issue #361. As the host of the Carnage symbiote, he is the main villain in the 1993 "Maximum Carnage" crossover, a 14-part storyline that spanned through all the Spider-Man titles. In 1996, two one-shot comics centered entirely around Carnage were released, entitled Carnage: Mind Bomb and Carnage: It's a Wonderful Life, both of which expand on his character.

After a 2004 appearance in New Avengers, the character was presumed dead and was absent from comics for nearly six years. A 2010–2011 limited series titled Carnage featured the return of Kasady as Carnage. The comic was released as a tie-in to the "Big Time" storyline in The Amazing Spider-Man. This was followed by another five-issue limited series titled Carnage U.S.A. and published in 2011–2012. Carnage was next seen in the 2012 "Minimum Carnage" crossover storyline between Scarlet Spider vol. 2, Venom vol. 2, and two one-shots titled Minimum Carnage Alpha and Minimum Carnage Omega. The character crosses over with the Superior Spider-Man in the 2013 five-issue limited series called Superior Carnage, written by Kevin Shinick.

A new Carnage series, starting in November 2015, as part of Marvel's post-"Secret Wars" relaunch, was written by Gerry Conway and Mike Perkins.

== Fictional character biography ==
=== Early life ===
Cletus Kasady is a psychopath and a homicidal sadist. He is a deeply disturbed individual whose dark past is revealed only through secondhand accounts and his own flawed recollections: he was born in a psychiatric prison at Ravencroft to a mother with paranoid schizophrenia, who died shortly after his birth. Kasady's mother died either by trying to kill Kasady, in retaliation for killing her dog, and then being beaten to the brink of death by Kasady's father, Roscoe, or by trying to defend Kasady from his father who was beating him, who then pushed her away, causing her to hit her neck against a table. Either way, Roscoe received no defense from him during the trial. As an orphan, Kasady was sent to the St. Estes Home for Boys, where his antisocial behavior made him the target of abuse from both the other orphans and the staff. Kasady gained revenge by murdering the disciplinarian administrator and burning down the orphanage. Kasady came to believe that life was essentially meaningless and futile, that "laws are only words", and came to see the spreading of chaos through random, unpatterned bloodshed as "the ultimate freedom" and thinking that he was actually "freeing" people.

=== Rebirth ===
Kasady becomes a serial killer and is convicted of eleven murders, though he claims to have killed a dozen more people. He is eventually captured and sent to Ryker's Island. His cellmate is Eddie Brock, host of the alien symbiote Venom. After escaping prison, Brock and Venom inadvertently leave behind Venom's offspring, which bonds to Kasady. Kasady escapes prison and begins a series of murders, writing "Carnage" on the walls with his own blood. The Carnage symbiote is defeated and apparently destroyed with sonic weaponry, but survives via its bond with Kasady. After entering Kasady's body through a small cut, Carnage bonds to his blood, taking on a red coloration. Kasady is able to regenerate the symbiote simply by bleeding himself.

=== Maximum Carnage ===
Kasady is taken to the Vault, a prison for super-villains, then to Ravencroft. A doctor at the facility, hoping to find a "cure" for his madness, draws blood from him. This unwittingly enables Kasady to transform into Carnage. Kasady goes on to recruit an army of psychopathic supervillains including Shriek, Demogoblin, Carrion, and Doppelganger, to take over New York City. Using Shriek's "psychic channel" powers, he also drives ordinary New Yorkers to attack one another. Carnage and his "family" are ultimately driven back by Spider-Man and Venom, with Carnage and Shriek being remanded to Ravencroft.

=== Web of Carnage ===
Carnage leaves Kasady's body and briefly bonds with John Jameson before transferring to Ben Reilly. Reilly attempts to destroy the symbiote by subjecting himself to microwave energy, but the symbiote flees back to the weakening Kasady.

Kasady escapes prison when a new governor at Ravencroft decides to try and save money by turning off some of the defenses around Kasady's cell. During this escape, Kasady is confronted by Spider-Man and the Silver Surfer. Carnage—driven to panic due to genetic memories of Galactus devouring a planet of symbiotes—leaves Kasady and bonds to the Surfer to stop him while Spider-Man is forced to take Kasady to a hospital. Spider-Man learns that Kasady is dying of a stomach tumor that had been kept in check by the symbiote.

=== Death and resurrection ===
Having tracked Kasady to a prison specially designed to hold him, Venom absorbs Carnage into himself. Without the symbiote, Kasady attempts to re-assume the Carnage persona by costuming himself in red paint and continuing his killing sprees, claiming that he still possesses at least some of Carnage's strength. Kasady later ends up in the Negative Zone, where he is guided by a strange voice to another symbiote that was kept sealed somewhere in the Zone. This voice is revealed to be a regenerated Carnage.

=== Breakout ===
Carnage is one of several supervillains trying to escape from the Raft. Sentry flies Carnage outside the Earth's atmosphere and rips him in half. Kasady survives, but both of his legs are severed. His body is preserved by the symbiote and given prosthetics. Kasady reclaims the symbiote and becomes Carnage once more, attempting to avenge his captivity while Spider-Man and Iron Man struggle to stop him. It is then revealed that Carnage is once again pregnant, and the suit's spawn briefly bonds to Shriek before being torn from her. Scared of Shriek's malice, the symbiote bonds to Tanis Nieves, becoming Scorn.

=== Minimum Carnage ===
Carnage escapes prison yet again with the help of microns. Agent Venom is sent to the prison and discovers Kasady has escaped. Carnage flees to Houston, Texas, and causes havoc, attracting the attention of the Scarlet Spider. Carnage takes the scientist Dr. Ketola, an expert in inter-dimensional transportation, as a hostage and escapes into the Microverse. He is defeated by Venom and Scarlet Spider, who use a sonic bomb from the Microverse to temporarily separate Kasady from the symbiote. Scarlet Spider then impales Kasady through the eye, lobotomizing him. Carnage goes into a catatonic state: the symbiote is keeping his body alive, but Kasady's brain and mind are irreparably damaged.

=== Superior Carnage ===
Kasady, now lobotomized, is broken out of prison by Wizard and Klaw, who intend to recruit him into the Frightful Four and turn him into their own version of Venom. Carnage breaks free from Wizard's control and nearly kills him, but is subdued by Klaw. Taking Carnage into their hideout, Wizard tries to take control of Kasady's mind but fails due to it being too damaged. Wizard then transfers the Symbiote to Karl Malus, who dubs himself "Superior Carnage". Carnage manages to repair Kasady's brain damage, followed by Kasady writing "CARNAGE RULES" on his cell wall.

=== AXIS ===
During the 2014 "AXIS" storyline, Carnage is among the villains recruited to battle Red Onslaught. During the battle with Red Onslaught, Doctor Doom and Scarlet Witch cast a spell which alters the moralities of almost everyone present, Carnage included. Filled with the irresistible urge to be a hero, Carnage returns to New York and goes around "saving" people, oblivious to the fact that he is causing more harm than good.

Faced with the threat of the morally inverted Avengers seeking to enforce their power and the inverted X-Men working with Apocalypse to take control of Manhattan, Spider-Man and the aged Steve Rogers are forced to work with Magneto and the "Astonishing Avengers" of Carnage and the other inverted villains. Although unable to destroy the X-Men's gene-bomb, which would have killed all humans in the blast radius, Carnage sacrifices himself to contain the blast with his own symbiote, Spider-Man describing Kasady's sacrifice as the worst man he ever knew doing the noblest thing he had ever seen.

=== Post-AXIS ===
Kasady is revealed to have cheated death again, though he has lost the lower half of his body again. He travels to Carefree, Arizona, to visit Sam Alexander / Nova, who he befriended during the time he was inverted. Kasady murders a bystander who he had asked to help find Nova as proof that his morality had returned to normal.

While attacking Sam at school, Carnage sees Nova flying around the area and is convinced that he is not Sam. In reality, Sam's mother had been wearing his helmet. Enraged, Carnage follows the false Nova, but loses sight of her. He then starts to attack civilians to try to get Nova's attention, which he succeeds in. Carnage is stopped by Nova and imprisoned in Ryker's Island.

=== Venomized ===
As the Poisons launch an all-out assault on the Marvel Universe, they are determined, since their last encounter with the alternate Carnage, not to leave such wildcard individuals which they designated as anomalies to be played against them. In that order, for his ability to summon monsters, they seek to consume Kid Kaiju while Thanos and Doctor Doom send Black Cat and others to fetch Cletus Kasady so they can separate him from Carnage. However, they learn that he is no longer bonded with Carnage. Kasady is later consumed by a Poison, but resists being assimilated by it. He is tossed into space by Venom and Danger, becoming one of the few Poisons to survive the death of the Poison Queen.

=== Absolute Carnage ===
Kasady survives and returns to Earth, badly burnt but alive. Scorn has established a cult dedicated to worshiping Knull, who intend to retrieve Kasady's body and bond him to the Grendel symbiote, forming a connection between him and Knull. Bonding to Grendel restores Kasady's body.

=== Rebirth ===
As a result of its journey through the multiverse, Carnage has all the power that it wanted in its desire to be a god, but desires worshippers and a host. After it is transported back to Ryker's Island, he consumes an inmate, incorporating into its body the DNA, and the memories of Kasady, creating a younger version of him to become whole again.

== In other media ==
=== Television ===
- Cletus Kasady / Carnage appears in Spider-Man: The Animated Series (1994), voiced by Scott Cleverdon. In the episodes "Venom Returns" and "Carnage", Kasady is captured by the police after threatening to detonate a bomb in New York and becomes Eddie Brock's cellmate in prison. After the Venom symbiote infiltrates the prison, re-bonds with Brock, and escapes, Baron Mordo appears before Kasady, telling him of another symbiote and offering him its powers in exchange for serving Dormammu. Kasady accepts and bonds with the new symbiote, becoming Carnage before escaping as well. After receiving the ability to steal life energy so Dormammu can escape his dimension and consume the human dimension, Carnage abducts Ashley Kafka, leading to Brock and Venom joining forces with Spider-Man and Iron Man to save her. In the ensuing battle, Carnage tries to drag Kafka into Dormammu's realm with him, but Brock and Venom sacrifice themselves to save her and fall through the portal with Carnage to ensure Dormammu's defeat.
- Cletus Kasady / Carnage appears in Spider-Man Unlimited (1999), voiced by Michael Donovan.
- Cletus Kasady makes a non-speaking cameo appearance in The Spectacular Spider-Man episode "Reinforcement" as a patient of Ravencroft. Had the series continued, he would have become Carnage.

=== Film ===
Woody Harrelson as Cletus Kasady in Venom (2018)

Cletus Kasady appears in films set in Sony's Spider-Man Universe, portrayed by Woody Harrelson. This version is a victim of extreme physical and psychological abuse dealt by his mother, father, and grandmother, the last of whom he killed to escape the abuse, and became a serial killer because the media labeled him a monster and canonized his abusers. Following his capture by the authorities, he was sent to San Quentin Prison and placed on death row, as California's governor decided to end the state's moratorium on executions in light of the exceptionally horrific nature of Kasady's crimes.

- Kasady first appears in the mid-credits scene of Venom, being interviewed by Eddie Brock in prison and promising "carnage" after his escape. Following the film's release, Harrelson stated that Kasady would play a major role in the sequel, having been unable to read its script until he signed on for the first film.
- Kasady returns in Venom: Let There Be Carnage. In this film, he becomes Carnage after biting Eddie Brock's hand during one of their interviews and absorbing part of the Venom symbiote. The symbiote, calling itself Carnage, saves Kasady from his execution and helps him free his childhood lover, Frances Barrison, in exchange for killing Brock and Venom. After going on a rampage through San Francisco and capturing Patrick Mulligan and Anne Weying to lure out Brock and Venom, Kasady and Barrison attempt to get married at a cathedral. They are interrupted by Brock and Venom, who trick Barrison into attacking Kasady and Carnage with her sonic powers and destroying the cathedral. As Kasady and Carnage's bond was incomplete, the former is separated from the symbiote, which Venom promptly devours before decapitating Kasady.

=== Video games ===
- Cletus Kasady / Carnage appears as a boss in The Amazing Spider-Man 2 (1992), Spider-Man and the X-Men in Arcade's Revenge, The Amazing Spider-Man: Lethal Foes, Spider-Man and Venom: Maximum Carnage, and Venom/Spider-Man: Separation Anxiety.
- Cletus Kasady / Carnage appears as a boss in Spider-Man (2000), voiced by Dee Bradley Baker. He assists Doctor Octopus in a plot to launch a symbiote invasion using clones made from his symbiote until he is defeated by Spider-Man. The symbiote later leaves Kasady to bond with Doctor Octopus and is seemingly killed, along with Kasady, when Doctor Octopus' base explodes.
- Cletus Kasady / Carnage appears as a playable character in the PSP version of Spider-Man: Friend or Foe, voiced by Fred Tatasciore.
- Cletus Kasady / Carnage appears as a playable character in the PS3, Xbox 360, PS4, Xbox One, and PC versions of Marvel: Ultimate Alliance 2. He also appears as a DLC character for the PS3 and Xbox 360 versions.
- Cletus Kasady / Carnage appears as a playable character in Marvel Super Hero Squad Online.
- Cletus Kasady / Carnage appears as a boss in Marvel: Avengers Alliance.
- Cletus Kasady / Carnage appears as a team-up character in Marvel Heroes.
- Cletus Kasady / Carnage appears as a playable character in Marvel Puzzle Quest.
- Cletus Kasady / Carnage appears as a playable character in Lego Marvel Super Heroes.
- Cletus Kasady / Carnage appears as the final boss of The Amazing Spider-Man 2 (2014), voiced by David Agranov. This version is a serial killer dubbed the "Carnage Killer" who murders other criminals and sees Spider-Man as a kindred spirit. Wilson Fisk secretly frees Kasady from prison to terrorize New York's citizens so that they will support the former's plans to redevelop the city. However, Kasady goes too far, forcing Fisk to call in Kraven the Hunter to stop him. After being defeated by Spider-Man and Kraven, Kasady is arrested and sent to Ravencroft, where Fisk funds an experiment to have Kasady injected with a symbiote-esque, nanite-based serum called "Venom". Once he gains control of it, Kasady escapes and infects others with it. After discovering the symbiote's weaknesses, Spider-Man defeats Kasady again and removes his symbiote before ensuring he is re-incarcerated.
- Cletus Kasady / Carnage appears as a playable character and boss in Spider-Man Unlimited.
- Cletus Kasady / Carnage appears as a playable character in Marvel: Contest of Champions.
- Cletus Kasady / Carnage appears as a playable character in Marvel: Future Fight.
- Cletus Kasady / Carnage appears as a playable character in Lego Marvel Super Heroes 2.
- Cletus Kasady / Carnage appears as a playable character in Marvel Strike Force.
- Cletus Kasady appears in Spider-Man 2 (2023), voiced by Chad Doreck. This version is an arsonist and cult leader known as "The Flame" who promises to bring his followers to "The Crimson Hour" and is a longtime adversary of former NYPD captain Yuri Watanabe, who recently became a ruthless vigilante called the Wraith. After Spider-Man and Wraith stop his attempts to blow up Brooklyn by derailing an Oscorp train, Kasady reveals his true intention was to steal a piece of the Venom symbiote that the train was carrying so he can use it to bring about the Crimson Hour before escaping with his followers.
- Cletus Kasady / Carnage appears as a playable character in Marvel Tokon: Fighting Souls, voiced by Kellen Goff in English and by Kosuke Okano in Japanese.

=== Miscellaneous ===
Cletus Kasady / Carnage appears in Spider-Man: Turn Off the Dark, played by Collin Baja. This version was originally an Oscorp scientist who was manipulated by the Green Goblin into becoming a member of his Sinister Six.
