= Shriek (character) =

Marvel Comics supervillainess

- Shriek as depicted in Spider-Man: The Jackal Files #1 (August 1994). Art by Michael Bair.

Publication information
- Publisher: Marvel Comics
- First appearance: Spider-Man Unlimited #1 (May 1993)
- Created by: Tom DeFalco; Ron Lim

In-story information
- Alter ego: Frances Louise Barrison
- Species: Human mutant
- Place of origin: New York
- Team affiliations: Doom Maidens; Carnage Family; Sinister Sixteen
- Partnerships: Carrion; Cletus Kasady/Carnage; Demogoblin; Doppelganger; Caroline le Fay
- Notable aliases: Sandra Deel
- Abilities: Flight; Sound manipulation; Sonic shield; Sonic energy blasts; Ability to tap into people's minds and bring out their inner darkness (fear, anger, hate) making them act violently

Shriek (Frances Louise Barrison) is a supervillain appearing in American comic books published by Marvel Comics. She is usually depicted as an enemy of Venom and Spider-Man. She is also the lover of Cletus Kasady, the first and best known incarnation of Carnage.

Naomie Harris portrayed the character in her first live-action appearance in the Sony's Spider-Man Universe film Venom: Let There Be Carnage (2021).

== Publication history ==
Shriek first appeared in Spider-Man Unlimited #1 (May 1993) and was created by writer Tom DeFalco and artist Ron Lim.

== Fictional character biography ==
Shriek's origins and real name were, at first, uncertain. She was named Sandra Deel in her earliest appearances, but named Frances Louise Barrison in later appearances. It is later clarified that Frances Louise Barrison is her birth name and Sandra Deel an alias.

During her childhood, Frances was abused by her mother for being overweight, driving her to drugs and leading to her later fixation on becoming a mother herself. She became a drug dealer, which exposed her to situations that ultimately damaged her sanity; namely, being shot in the head by a police officer, and being put in Cloak's Darkforce, which awakened Shriek's latent mutant abilities.

Shriek debuted at the start of the "Maximum Carnage" crossover. During Carnage's violent escape from the Ravencroft mental institution, he came across Shriek, who was also incarcerated and wished to join him. He freed her, and the pair embarked on a killing spree. They attracted the company of several other homicidal supervillains (Demogoblin, Doppelganger, and Carrion), and formed a "family," with Carnage and Shriek as the "parents" and the others as their "sons". The killers fight a number of heroes, led by Spider-Man, but succumbed to in-fighting. Carnage kills Doppelganger and left the others to their defeat and capture.

Carrion and Shriek in The Amazing Spider-Man #392. Art by Mark Bagley.

When Ashley Kafka brings Malcolm McBride near Shriek's cell at Ravencroft, Shriek recognizes Malcolm as her "son" Carrion, breaks out of her room, and escapes from Ravencroft with Malcolm. Agitated by Malcolm's refusal to acknowledge her as his mother, Shriek becomes violent towards him, and uses her powers to turn him back into Carrion after an encounter with Spider-Man, who Shriek plans on making her new "husband" after sensing a growing darkness within him. In an attempt to make Carrion fully embrace her as his mother, Shriek takes him to Beatrice McBride, the biological mother of Malcolm, with the intent of having Carrion murder the woman. The duo are tracked by Spider-Man, and in the ensuing brawl, Shriek abandons her plans to convert Spider-Man to her side, and forces Carrion to choose between her and Beatrice. The distraught Carrion instead begins to commit suicide with his own powers, which Beatrice tries to stop. Shriek absorbs the Carrion virus, incapacitating herself, and returning Carrion to his human form.

The symbiote-enhanced Shriek in Carnage #4. Art by Clayton Crain.

After Carnage is returned to Earth by Hall Industries, the company purchases Ravencroft with the intention of using Shriek as a power source for the Carnage symbiote. Shriek is brought to Hall Industries, where exposure to the Carnage symbiote, coupled with her witnessing guards beating Doppelganger (who had been attempting to rescue her) causes her to snap, and return to homicidal mania. After Cletus Kasady reunites with his symbiote, Shriek and Doppelganger aid him in causing chaos throughout New York City, with Shriek gaining additional powers from another symbiote that Carnage had spawned. Growing fearful of Shriek, the symbiote leaves her in favor of Tanis Nieves, its initial host, to create Scorn. Shriek is rendered comatose after Scorn damages her brain.

Shriek regains consciousness, and is recruited by Caroline le Fay to battle the Fearless Defenders as a member of the new Doom Maidens. After the Doom Maidens are disbanded, Shriek reunites with Carnage, and saves him from Deadpool in Tulsa, Oklahoma. The two killers flee pursued by Deadpool, who crashes their car with a combine harvester, severely injuring Shriek. Carnage flings Deadpool away, and escapes with Shriek. Carnage, troubled by Deadpool making him question his nihilistic beliefs, has Shriek help him break into a psychiatric hospital, where they try to force the patients and staff to answer Carnage's questions about being controlled by higher powers, a concept which disgusts Carnage. After a skirmish with Carnage, Deadpool captures Shriek, uses his symbiotes to disguise her as himself, and tricks Carnage into nearly killing her, causing Carnage to suffer a mental breakdown. Shriek is hospitalized, and Carnage willingly allows himself to be arrested.

Shriek recovers and is hired onto the Sinister Sixteen by Boomerang and Owl. After being manipulated and abandoned by Boomerang, Shriek and three other members of the Sinister Sixteen seek revenge on him, only to be defeated by Boomerang, Beetle, Overdrive, and Speed Demon.

== Powers and abilities ==
Being a mutant and following exposure to Cloak's Darkforce, Shriek has the ability to manipulate sound in a number of elaborate ways. She can harness it for destructive concussive force or use it to disorient and agitate her enemies. She can apparently hypersonically induce intense emotion in those around her (generating fear, hate, or despair). She also has moderate powers of levitation that she can use to make herself fly and possibly some low level of psionic ability.

She is able to sense the darkest side to a person's psyche so that she can use her powers to specifically manipulate that person's emotions.

== Reception ==
- In 2021, Screen Rant included Shriek in their "Spider-Man: 10 Best Female Villains" list.
- In 2022, Comic Book Resources (CBR) ranked Shriek and Carnage 6th in their "10 Most Violent Spider-Man Villains" list.

== Other versions ==
=== Marvel Zombies ===
A zombified alternate universe version of Shriek from Earth-13264 appears in Secret Wars.

=== Spider-Man: Heroes & Villains ===
Shriek appears in Spider-Man: Heroes & Villains Collection.

== In other media ==
=== Television ===
Shriek appears in Ultimate Spider-Man, voiced by Ashley Eckstein.

=== Film ===
Frances Barrison appears in Venom: Let There Be Carnage, portrayed by Naomie Harris. This version fell in love with Cletus Kasady in her youth while they were both at the St. Estes Home for Unwanted Children before she was taken to the Ravencroft Institute. On the way there, Barrison tried to use her sonic powers to escape but was shot by police officer Patrick Mulligan. While Mulligan believed that he had killed her, Barrison survived, but was left heavily scarred, blind in her left eye, and subsequently imprisoned within a reinforced glass cell. In the present, after Kasady becomes Carnage, he breaks Barrison out of Ravencroft, and together they go on a rampage through San Francisco before capturing Mulligan and Anne Weying to lure out Venom. As Kasady and Barrison attempt to get married in a cathedral, they are confronted by Venom. In the ensuing fight, Barrison kills Mulligan before Carnage tries to kill her for using her powers near him. Venom tricks her into attacking Kasady and Carnage with her powers, demolishing the cathedral and causing a bell to fall and crush her.

=== Video games ===
- Shriek appears as a boss in Spider-Man and Venom: Maximum Carnage.
- Shriek appears as a boss in Spider-Man 3, voiced by Courtenay Taylor. This version is the leader of the Waster Tribe gang, derives her powers from a symbiote, and is married to Michael Morbius, whom she unwittingly turned into a vampire. Shriek manages to cure Morbius of his vampirism, but is left severely weakened and rendered comatose. Spider-Man leaves the unconscious Shriek in Morbius and Curt Connors' care so they may help her.
