= Maximum Carnage =

1993 comic book crossover

- Cover of Spider-Man: Maximum Carnage (2005), trade paperback collected edition
- Publisher: Marvel Comics
- Publication date: May – August 1993
- Genre: Superhero; Crossover
Title(s)
The Amazing Spider-Man #378-380
Spider-Man #35-37
The Spectacular Spider-Man #201-203
Spider-Man Unlimited #1-2
Web of Spider-Man #101-103
- Main character(s): Spider-Man; Venom; Eddie Brock; Carnage; Cletus Kasady; Carrion; Demogoblin; Doppleganger; Shriek; Cloak and Dagger

Creative team
- Writer(s): Tom DeFalco; J.M. DeMatteis; Terry Kavanagh; David Michelinie
- Maximum Carnage: ISBN 0-7851-0987-0

"Maximum Carnage" is a 14-part comic book crossover published in Marvel Comics' Spider-Man family of titles in 1993. It featured Spider-Man, Venom, and a host of other superheroes teaming up to face Venom's murderous offspring Carnage and his team of supervillains.

== Plot ==
Since the alien symbiote to which he was bonded was destroyed during his capture, Cletus Kasady is presumed powerless and jailed at Ravencroft Asylum. However, the symbiote mutated his blood before its destruction, enabling Kasady to reconstitute the symbiote and break out. During his escape, Kasady—again calling himself Carnage—frees fellow inmate Shriek.

Over the course of their ensuing killing spree through New York City, they recruit Doppelganger, Demogoblin, and Carrion. Carnage dubs himself their "father", but the three despise Carnage and stay with the group out of devotion to Shriek. As the death toll increases, Spider-Man, Venom, Captain America, Black Cat, Nightwatch, Cloak and Dagger, Iron Fist, Deathlok, Morbius, and Firestar all join the cause of stopping them, but the heroes are polarized between Venom's desire to stop Carnage at all costs and Spider-Man's refusal to use violent methods, and Spider-Man ultimately abandons Venom to Carnage's mercies. In addition, Shriek uses her psychic powers to turn the populace of New York City into a bloodthirsty rabble, allowing the killers to continue their rampage with impunity.

Carnage finally turns on the rest of his gang, and, in the ensuing battle, Shriek is distracted from using her psychic power. Taking advantage of the lull, the heroes acquire a device from the Rand Corporation which projects feelings of love and hope into the villains, overwhelming them. Carnage flees, faking his death by covering a victim in a mock symbiote costume, and the others are captured. Once the heroes are dispersed, Carnage ambushes Venom. The device has left Carnage frantic and confused, and Venom pounds him relentlessly before tackling him into an electrical generator. Carnage is knocked senseless and left to be incarcerated.

== Publications ==
=== Original printing ===
Part 1: Spider-Man Unlimited #1

Part 2: Web of Spider-Man #101

Part 3: The Amazing Spider-Man #378

Part 4: Spider-Man #35

Part 5: The Spectacular Spider-Man #201

Part 6: Web of Spider-Man #102

Part 7: The Amazing Spider-Man #379

Part 8: Spider-Man #36

Part 9: The Spectacular Spider-Man #202

Part 10: Web of Spider-Man #103

Part 11: The Amazing Spider-Man #380

Part 12: Spider-Man #37

Part 13: The Spectacular Spider-Man #203

Part 14: Spider-Man Unlimited #2

== Collected editions ==
Title	Material collected	Published date	ISBN
Spider-Man: Maximum Carnage	Amazing Spider-Man #378-380, Spectacular Spider-Man #201-203, Spider-Man #35-37, Web of Spider-Man #101-103 and material from Spider-Man Unlimited #1-2	September 1994	978-0785100386
Amazing Spider-Man Epic Collection: Maximum Carnage	Amazing Spider-Man #378-380, Spectacular Spider-Man #201-203, Spider-Man #35-37, Web of Spider-Man #101-103, Spider-Man/Punisher/Sabretooth: Designer Genes #1 and material from Spider-Man Unlimited #1-2	January 2020	978-1302921903
Carnage Epic Collection: Born in Blood	Amazing Spider-Man #361-363 and #378-380, Web of Spider-Man #101-103, Spider-Man #35-37, Spectacular Spider-Man #201-203 and material from Spider-Man Unlimited #1-2 and Amazing Spider-Man Annual #28	March 2022	978-1302946623

== In other media ==
=== Television ===
- Elements of the Maximum Carnage and Spider-Island storylines are adapted in the Ultimate Spider-Man episode "The Symbiote Saga".

=== Film ===
- Maximum Carnage, as well as the Spider-Man: The Animated Series story arc The Venom Saga (1996), serves as the primary inspiration for the 2021 film Venom: Let There Be Carnage.

=== Video games ===
- Maximum Carnage served as the basis for LJN's 1994 video game Spider-Man and Venom: Maximum Carnage, which was released for the Genesis and the Super NES video game platforms.

=== Pinball ===
- The wizard mode of Zen Studios' virtual pinball adaptation of the Marvel Comics character Venom is named after the comic book storyline, representing Spider-Man, Venom, Captain America, Deathlok and Dagger's efforts to defeat Carnage.

=== Merchandise ===
- An action figure line was released by Toy Biz to capitalize on the crossover's success. The line featured Spider-Man, Venom, and Carnage.

=== Theme parks ===
- During Halloween Horror Nights 12 at Universal Orlando's Islands of Adventure, Marvel Super Hero Island was converted into a scarezone based on the story arc, and a full haunted house called Maximum Carnage was created. In this version, Carnage has killed all of the Marvel superheroes that came after him, resulting in criminal gangs running the streets. Certain items gave the island the appearance that famous superheroes fought (and lost) on the scenery, resulting in their death.
