= Cloak and Dagger (characters) =

Marvel Comics characters

- Cloak and Dagger taken from a print ad promoting the characters' 1983 eponymous comic book mini-series Art by Rick Leonardi.

Publication information
- Publisher: Marvel Comics
- First appearance: Peter Parker, the Spectacular Spider-Man #64 (March 1982)
- Created by: Bill Mantlo (writer); Ed Hannigan (artist)

In-story information
- Alter ego: Cloak; Tyrone "Ty" Johnson; Dagger; Tandy Bowen
- Species: Both; Human mutate
- Team affiliations: Both; X-Men; Dark X-Men; Secret Avengers; Runaways; The Assembly of Evil; Dagger; New Warriors; Secret Defenders; Marvel Knights
- Partnerships: Mayhem
- Notable aliases: Cloak; Cloak; Demon of Darkness; Dagger; Dagger; Lady Light
- Abilities: Cloak: Teleportation via the Darkforce; Insanity and paranoia inducement; Darkness manipulation; Darkforce Telekinesis; Can see and manipulate the fear of others; Flight and Levitation; Cloak manipulation; Darkforce Tendrils/Appendages; Transportation to the Darkforce Dimension via his cloak; Drawing strength from the fears of those he touches; Physic and Telepathic link with Dagger; Density manipulation and Intangibility; Invisibility; Dagger: Only living generator of Lightforce and can generate a limitless amount of it endlessly.; Light-speed movement and reflexes.; Can manipluate the very concept of Light to do things like bending light around her body to render herself invisible and even bend lasers.; Can Create constructs made of light like Daggers, weapons, chains, armor, and much more.; Use her daggers of Lightforce to cleanse addictions and corruption from people; Create a barrage of daggers of Lightforce to dazzle opponents from a distance; Use her Lightforce daggers to inflict physical pain from a distance; Use her Lightforce dagger to pacify Cloak's darkness; Purifying Blast via her Lightforce; Can see, steal, and manipulate hope of other people typically by touching them; Physic and Telepathic link with Cloak; Healing light

Cloak (Tyrone "Ty" Johnson) and Dagger (Tandy Bowen) are a superhero duo appearing in American comic books published by Marvel Comics. Created by writer Bill Mantlo and artist Ed Hannigan, the characters first appeared in Peter Parker, the Spectacular Spider-Man #64 (March 1982). Cloak and Dagger started out as two teenagers who both ran away from home and ended up meeting each other at a fateful bus stop in New York. After being kidnapped and experimented on, they found themselves both possessing the twin superpowers of Light and Darkness control. Cloak can teleport, manipulate Darkness, and alter his body's density from impenetrably solid to intangible, while Dagger can heal people with her light, manipulate light, create daggers of light and other light-based constructs that can either heal or harm people. They can also both draw power from the emotions of those they touch, Dagger through hope and Cloak through fear.

Marvel Television produced a two-season self-titled live-action television series set in the Marvel Cinematic Universe, with Aubrey Joseph as Ty Johnson and Olivia Holt as Tandy Bowen. Additionally, Joseph and Holt reprised their roles in the third season of Runaways following the former series' cancellation.

== Concept and creation ==
The inspiration for Cloak and Dagger came to Bill Mantlo after a visit to Ellis Island. He recounted, "They came in the night, when all was silent and my mind was blank. They came completely conceived as to their powers and attributes, their origin and motivation. They embodied between them all that fear and misery, hunger and longing that had haunted me on Ellis Island."

Ed Hannigan, Mantlo's artist collaborator on Peter Parker, the Spectacular Spider-Man, recalled that he and Mantlo jointly came up with the characters' visual design: "Bill had a short page or two synopsis of the story that he showed me, and we discussed what the characters would look like. He gave me a lot of leeway, but it was fairly obvious that Cloak would be black and have a big 'animated' black cloak and Dagger would be white with a skintight leotard-type thing. I am not sure, but I think I might have come up with her ballet angle. I put the same kind of amulet/clasp on both costumes and came up with the dagger-shaped cutout on her costume, which was quite daring at the time."

== Publication history ==
Cloak and Dagger first appeared in Peter Parker, the Spectacular Spider-Man #64 (March 1982). After a number of additional Spider-Man guest appearances, they were given their own four-issue limited series, written by creator Bill Mantlo, penciled by Rick Leonardi, and inked by Terry Austin. It debuted in October 1983 and was a success, prompting Marvel Comics to launch an ongoing bi-monthly Cloak and Dagger series in 1985, with the same creative team. Costumed supervillains rarely appeared in the series, which focused on Cloak and Dagger's quest to end the drug trade completely, and frequently explored the issue of vigilantism. Leonardi left after issue #6 and was replaced by a series of fill-in pencillers.

After issue #11, Marvel combined the bi-monthly titles Cloak and Dagger and Doctor Strange into a monthly revival of the double-feature series Strange Tales. The title change was accompanied by Bret Blevins stepping in as both penciller and inker. Austin would briefly return, but as the series writer this time, Mantlo having ended his run with issue #6. Though still successful, Cloak and Dagger's sales had been declining for some time, and Marvel's editorial staff felt that a new writer was needed to revitalize the characters. Austin immediately introduced Cloak and Dagger's first nemesis, Mister Jip. In 1988, they starred in Marvel Graphic Novel #34: Cloak and Dagger: Predator and Prey, which was written by Mantlo before his departure from the series. Strange Tales ran 19 issues before Marvel decided to split Cloak and Dagger and Doctor Strange back into separate bi-monthly titles.

The series, The Mutant Misadventures of Cloak and Dagger, was written by Austin and penciled by Mike Vosburg. Dagger was rendered blind in the first issue, and her struggles to deal with this new disability were a major theme of the series. Austin did extensive research at the American Foundation for the Blind so he could authentically depict the physical and psychological impacts of blindness and the coping techniques used by blind people. With issue #14, Steve Gerber and Terry Kavanagh took over the writing, but sales began to falter and the series was canceled with issue #19.

The pair continued to make numerous appearances as guest stars in titles such as Runaways and the Spider-Man "Maximum Carnage" story arc, as well as starring in their own adventures in anthology titles like Marvel Comics Presents. Cloak made a solo appearance in issues of the miniseries House of M, as a member of an underground human resistance movement. It was uncertain if Dagger also existed in the altered reality of "House of M" as there were no mentions of her during that storyline.

They have appeared in various other Marvel Universes, one of which included a storyline where Cloak was killed. Dagger also served as a member of Marvel Knights in a short running mini-series.

It was announced at the 2008 San Diego Comic-Con that the team would be reappearing once again in their own five-part mini-series by writer Valerie D'Orazio, with pencils by Irene Flores and colors by Emily Warren. The series was never published.

They appeared in the Dark Avengers/Uncanny X-Men crossover "Utopia", in which writer Matt Fraction stated they would be presented with a chance "to have their reputations exonerated and their records sealed [if they join the Dark X-Men]." Fraction explained, "Osborn presents it to them as the ultimate public service, [in which] they can work off their past indiscretions—[such as] Cloak's dealings with the Avengers during the Skrull invasion." Fraction claimed the more appealing part of Dark X-Men was to see how Cloak and Dagger react in a real superhero team scenario.

To tie in with the 2015 storyline "Secret Wars", ND Stevenson and Sanford Greene created a spin-off series based on Runaways.

== Fictional character biography ==
=== Origin ===
Tyrone "Ty" Johnson (Cloak) and Tandy Bowen (Dagger) meet in New York City as runaways. Tyrone was a 17-year-old boy from Boston, Massachusetts, with a stutter who ran away from his home and his parents to New York City when his speech impediment prevented him from stopping his friend from being shot by the police, who mistakenly believed he had just robbed a store. Tandy was a 16-year-old girl from a privileged upbringing (born in Shaker Heights, Ohio) who ran away because her multi-millionaire mother neglected Tandy for her supermodel career and social life and left Tandy feeling alone and unloved because her mother didn't care to spend time with her daughter. When they meet both Ty and Tandy felt alone and scared in a place neither of them had ever been before this was until Tyrone leaped into action to pursue a thief that stole Tandy's purse, Tandy would offer to buy dinner and the two would become fast friends. When a naïve Tandy accepts an offer of shelter from some strange men, a wary Tyrone goes along to protect her. The two teens would end up being forcibly kidnapped delivered to Simon Marshall, a criminal chemist who's developing a new synthetic drug for Silvermane and the Maggia with tests on runaway teens that have fatal results. Johnson and Bowen would be the only two runaway teens to somehow survive the drug injections and experimentations and they fled. During their escape, the experiment turns them into super-powered beings. Tyrone finds himself engulfed in darkness and seized by a strange hunger that eases in the presence Tandy who now burned with a brilliant and scorching light, burning so bright that only the cool energies of Ty's Darkness could temper her light and bring her soul comfort. Tyrone tries to hide his shadowy appearance in a makeshift cloak by absorbing Marshall's thugs into his darkness while Tandy strikes them down with daggers of light. The two teens dub themselves "Cloak & Dagger", and vowed to protect the innocent making sure that the tragedy that befell them wouldn't happen to another soul. Cloak and Dagger created an environment of symbiotic mutualism between themselves, operating and functioning as two halves of a whole that represent balance. Their powers changed their body's chemistry in a way that they became dependent on each other for living, Dagger's light burns too bright and needs the cool energies of Cloak's Darkforce to temper her while Cloak's darkness is an abyss of hunger that needs the energy of Lightforce/Lifeforce that only Dagger can provide to be satiated. Their codependence at first started as a means of survival, but over time their fondness for each other emerged and it transformed into romance and their form of release. They portray unity through dichotomy on various things like; race, powers, upbringings, world views, and more. They are aided by local priest Father Delgado and Detective Brigid O'Reilly.

During Cloak and Dagger's travels around the world, Dagger is briefly reunited with her father, a type of guru in India who develops an ability to manipulate personal "light" like Tandy, but uses as a form of control over others to increase his own power, seemingly killing Ty when he interferes with personal plans. Cloak and Dagger oppose the Lord of Light who flings himself into Cloak's portal.

Later it is revealed that during this time, D'Spayre had been manipulating these events from behind the scenes.

=== War on Drugs and other heroes ===
Cloak and Dagger became vigilantes who then hunt down and kill Simon Marshall's drug-dealing crime-ring responsible for activating their powers. They first encountered Spider-Man during these events. They next murdered Silvermane's reanimated cyborg form in revenge. They next teamed with Spider-Man to thwart the Punisher's murder attempt on the Kingpin.

When their activities became too damaging for the illegal drug trade, some dealers kidnapped members of the New Mutants and tried to control them by injecting them with a drug similar to that which gave the duo their powers. For a time, they lost their powers to the heroes Sunspot and Wolfsbane but they cooperated in retrieving them when it was learned the others were not handling it well. Cloak and Dagger saved them with Spider-Man, but turned down an offer to join the X-Men's School for Gifted Youngsters. Cloak and Dagger battled Silvermane and the Answer. Kingpin wanted Dagger to help heal Vanessa Fisk, but Dagger refused to help. Cloak and Dagger befriended the superpowered preteens Power Pack and twice aided the New Mutants, junior trainees of the X-Men. The duo eventually learned they were mutants themselves, which is also the reason why they were the only test subjects to survive the drug's administration in the first place. Though they tend to target ordinary street criminals, they have faced such diverse foes as Doctor Doom, the Beyonder, Vermin, the Zapper, the Disciplinarian, the Warlord of Kampuchea, Mephisto, Thanos, the Assembly of Evil, Firebrand, and Lightmaster.

Dagger was later corrupted by Night having her powers swapped from Darkness to light, and battled X-Factor, and lost her sight temporarily. Cloak and Dagger battled Hydro-Man, the second Jester, the Hulk android, Rock, and Fenris alongside the Avengers. Dagger later regained her sight, and helped defeat Mister Jip. Cloak later unknowingly met his twin sister. Cloak and Dagger later battled D'Spayre, learning that he gave them their Dark Form and Light Form, which had been pieces of his soul, which interfered with their natural mutations.

Cloak and Dagger played a small part in the Infinity Gauntlet saga. When Thanos used the Infinity Gauntlet to sacrifice half of the population of the universe to Death, Dagger was among the superheroes who vanished. Cloak answered the summons of Adam Warlock to join a task force of the remaining superheroes to fight Thanos. During the assault on Thanos by the assembled team, Cloak pulls Thanos into the Darkforce, but is killed by Thanos. Cloak is resurrected after Nebula claims the Gauntlet and undoes most of the preceding events.

The two often lived in churches, supported by friends and priests. Cloak has run away many times, struggling to understand that Dagger is fully willing to use her light powers to help contain his darkness. Though deeply connected in their mission, Dagger sometimes yearns for more out of life. During an international case, Tandy performed with Eurocirque as Lady Light. Tandy found new friends in the New Warriors who teamed with Cloak, Dagger, and other heroes to defeat the shadow-lunatic Darkling. She also joined the team for a brief period, leading to further tension with Cloak.

=== Maximum Carnage ===
During the 1993 "Maximum Carnage" event, Cloak and Dagger teamed up with Spider-Man, Captain America, Black Cat, Nightwatch, Iron Fist, Deathlok, Morbius, Venom, and Firestar to halt Carnage and his allies' murderous rampage across New York City. Dagger was apparently killed by Shriek while saving Spider-Man, but she was later revealed to be only severely wounded and recuperating within Cloak's shroud and was instrumental in defeating Carnage.

=== Marvel Knights ===
After Tyrone leaves Tandy's side, he is no longer able to control his hunger and consumes any and every lawbreaker, no matter how small the offense. While searching for him in churches she meets the Black Widow who she teams up with to prevent a church from being robbed. Daredevil later appears and both assist him on a mission he received from the Punisher.

Dagger becomes a member of the now-defunct "Marvel Knights" team, partnering up with many different heroes, including Shang-Chi, Luke Cage, Moon Knight, and Daredevil. During her time with the Knights, Dagger developed a deep friendship with the Black Widow (Natasha Romanova). Natasha brings Tandy to the guidance of Doctor Strange in the hopes of finding Tyrone. The Marvel Knights and Strange locate and battle Cloak, during which most of the group are absorbed into his cape. Strange reveals that Cloak has been possessed by Nightmare. Tandy manages to overpower and absorb Cloak's powers, freeing everyone from his cape.

For some time, the Black Widow lets Ty and Tandy live in her apartment, which was later attacked by a homicidal Life Model Decoy of Nick Fury. Though at this point he was a normal human, Ty managed to defeat the robot.

=== Runaways ===
Cloak and Dagger make their return in Runaways, in which Tyrone appears repowered and stable. At one stage, the LAPD recruited the team to locate the Runaways. During their initial encounter, Dagger quickly knocked out Nico Minoru with her light and Cloak easily absorbed Chase Stein, Karolina Dean, Alex Wilder, and Nico. Gertrude Yorkes was able to halt Dagger's light attacks with her dinosaur Old Lace, as Dagger's light had no effect on animals, and Molly Hayes managed to pull Cloak's cloak from his body, severing his connection to the Darkforce. This caused a ceasefire, during which time Gertrude and Molly explained to Cloak and Dagger that the LAPD were actually corrupt and under the control of the Runaways' supervillain parents, the Pride. Cloak managed to reconnect to his cloak and rescue the Runaways he had absorbed, and he and Dagger both promised to return to New York and bring back the Avengers to stop the Pride and rescue the Runaways. However, the traitor in the Runaways—Alex—instead contacted the LAPD, which had the Pride erase Tandy's and Ty's actual memories of the group, thus preventing them from helping the Runaways.

Cloak was later impersonated by Reginald Mantz who was using Mutant Growth Hormone to replicate Cloak's powers. Mantz, stalked and attacked Dagger, leaving her hospitalized. After a fight with the New Avengers led to him sustaining a blow to the head, Cloak regained his memories and requested the Runaways' assistance in clearing his name, as he had been framed for attacking Dagger. Cloak appealed to the fact that they all shared bonds in being runaways and explains the reasons he and Dagger never helped them as planned. They agreed to help, and successfully helped Cloak apprehend his impostor, the delusional orderly, Reginald Mantz, who believed that he and Tandy were in a relationship.

=== "Civil War" ===
Cloak and Dagger are revealed to be members of Captain America's faction of super heroes who oppose the Superhuman Registration Act during the 2006 "Civil War" storyline.

Cloak is shot by S.H.I.E.L.D. tranquilizers while teleporting Captain America and the rebel faction to a chemical plant where they believed a catastrophic accident had taken place. It turns out to be a trap set by Iron Man waiting with the pro-registration faction. Dagger is hit with a lightning attack by a clone of Thor.

It is then revealed that the pair were captured during a mission in Queens and jailed in the Negative Zone prison. They are freed by Hulkling, who was disguised as the pro-registration Hank Pym, which leads to the climactic battle between the two sides, both of which Cloak teleports to Times Square, New York.

=== "Secret Invasion" ===
During the "Secret Invasion" storyline, Luke Cage calls Cloak who drops the New Avengers at the top of Stark Tower to steal one of Tony Stark's quinjets. When Cage offers to take him with them to find the downed Skrull ship, Cloak refuses, and vanishes.

=== Dark X-Men and "Utopia" ===
During the "Dark Reign" storyline, Norman Osborn tracks down Tandy and Tyrone in Colombia, burning down drug fields and approaches them to join his new team of X-Men. Initially against it, as they know of Osborn's past and do not consider themselves mutants, Osborn tells them that they can take their war on drugs to a global scale as well as having no trouble with police anymore. Dagger agrees to the deal for them both, but Cloak remains hesitant.

Cloak and Dagger are later recruited into the Dark X-Men by Osborn. After Emma Frost's and Namor's betrayal of the team, Emma offers them the opportunity to join the real X-Men and their exodus from the US, to which both instantly agree. During their time with the X-Men, Cloak becomes involved with Wolverine's plan to kill Romulus along with Bruce Banner and Skaar. Dagger is kidnapped and Romulus orders her to be beaten. Wolverine and Cloak manage to save her, and Wolverine kills her kidnapper, much to her chagrin. However, she tells Tyrone to continue helping Wolverine, as he needs his help. Aiding Wolverine, Cloak uses his power to trap Romulus in the Darkforce. However, Romulus later escapes and fights with Wolverine and Cloak.

=== 2010 Cloak and Dagger one-shot ===
After doing tests on Dagger, Doctor Nemesis confirms that they are not mutants, disappointing her as she enjoyed being on a team. It is revealed later that Tyrone was dating Tia, a girl from his old neighborhood, behind Dagger's back. Eventually, Tia reveals that she knows his secret identity as Cloak and has him kidnapped, torturing him to keep him from using his powers. Dagger becomes worried after he does not return home after a few days and manages to track him down. With the help of X-Men Anole and Dr. Nemesis, she fights off his captors whereupon Tia reveals that she has powers as well and has been brainwashed to hate them. Tia manages to escape the fight and Tandy and Tyrone decide to leave Utopia and the X-Men and return to New York to work on rekindling their relationship.

=== "Spider-Island" ===
In the "Spider-Island" storyline as Cloak and Dagger are established to have been left homeless after their church was determined by authorities to be in violation of building codes. They then were confronted by the Avengers who informed them about the present spider problem at hand. It is also revealed that Dagger is attending college classes as an attempt to normalize her life. Cloak has contradicting views as he acknowledges them as "special". After Mister Negative hears of a prophecy that he is destined to be killed by Dagger, he kidnaps her and corrupts her with his negative touch; her powers are changed, now working through the Darkforce. Similar to Cloak, she gets the "hunger" for light and starts dying from the lack of it. Cloak pleads with Negative to give him the touch. He surprisingly agrees, altering Cloak's abilities to be powered by light. Cloak feeds Dagger his light, causing an explosion. In the aftermath it is revealed that Dagger now has Cloak's original powers, and Cloak has Dagger's. This change in powers recalls the reference to D'Spayre's influence on their life, as according to him in the final issue of their original run, these were the power sets they were always originally meant to have, but D'Spayre interfered, resulting in Cloak and Dagger having 'reversed' power sets, and considered weaker than what they would have been had D'Spayre not gotten involved in their lives.

=== All-New, All-Different Marvel ===
Following the Secret Wars storyline as part of the All-New, All-Different Marvel' initiative, Cloak and Dagger have returned, still using the other's powers, but are now evil due to the corrupting influence of Mister Negative. Although Martin Li was arrested at some point, Cloak and Dagger have been using Shade patches, which dose them with a drug that simulates the effects of Negative's touch, ensuring that their criminal personas will 'remain' loyal to him. After Cloak, Dagger, and the Inner Demons break Li out of the prison ship where he was being kept and restore him to Negative, he has the duo bring him to Parker Industries in Shanghai. Although Peter is able to escape being corrupted by Negative thanks to Negative's prior corruption of Spider-Man, Cloak and Dagger manage to escape when Peter tracks them to a drug lab by secretly placing a Spider-Tracer on Cloak. Using this tracer, Peter is able to inject Cloak with a cure for Shade that he later uses to cure Dagger, apparently restoring their original powers. Although Negative has escaped, Cloak and Dagger decide to remain in Shanghai to guard it from any future attacks.

During the "Blood Hunt" storyline, Cloak is among the Darkforce users who lose control of their powers, blocking out the sun and enabling a vampire invasion. With Cloak indisposed, Dagger is left to battle the vampires on her own.

== Powers and abilities ==
Cloak and Dagger both have moderate experience at street fighting. Dagger's combat techniques utilize her Lightforce powers and ballet-dance training as well as her sense of spatial relations, which had been heightened by her temporary blindness.

The two's powers were swapped by Mister Negative in "Spider-Island", with Cloak using light powers and Dagger using Darkforce daggers. After being injected with an antidote developed by Parker Industries for Mister Negative's drug, the pair swapped back to their original powers.

=== Cloak ===
Tyrone Johnson's body is a living portal to the Darkforce Dimension, which he uses to teleport himself and others. By folding into his own shadow-form, he can enter this alternate realm, walk a few steps, and emerge miles away back on Earth. He can also teleport by stepping through nearby shadows or manipulating the fabric of reality around him.

While there is no limit to the number of people or objects Tyrone can transport, he usually reserves this for his partner, Dagger. Most beings cannot safely endure the Darkforce Dimension and anyone trapped in this darkness experiences a piercing, numbing cold alongside terrifying visions of their worst nightmares, which can cause permanent insanity over prolonged periods.

As Cloak, Tyrone is naturally intangible but can solidify his body through pure willpower or by temporarily absorbing enough light. He suffers from a constant, supernatural hunger that can only be satisfied by consuming light, either projected by Dagger or drained from victims he banishes to the dark dimension. Over time, he learns to develop better control over this hunger.

=== Dagger ===
Tandy can form constructs made of Lightforce. Primarily, these have been 6-inch 'light daggers' which she can throw from her fingertips. Though she usually wills her Daggers to be, her daggers may automatically form under certain conditions, such as another person in danger. The maximum effective range is unknown, Tandy has the ability to control their flight and reinforce them by compelling them to seek targets. They can track a being, but it is most effective when searching for her partner Cloak. Those hit by these knives have their own lifeforce disrupted. Dagger can then drain a portion of their lifeforce; enough to kill if she wishes. Normally she chooses to leave them in a state of shock where they will see a vision of how their life might be different. The experience is powerful enough to make most individuals rethink their choices, although a hardened criminal or evil being is unlikely to change their ways. During her membership of the Savage Avengers, however, she discovered that she could create more complex constructs, including armor, mech-suits, chains, swords, a swing, a bow and arrows, and a scale model of a temple the team was about to assault. Tandy now believes that her only limitation is her imagination. Tandy can also generate lethal and non-lethal Lighforce blast often seen using these blasts to either heal large groups of her allies in battle or take down massive enemy groups. To add her Lightforce blasts can be very destructive as is best displayed when she used her blasts to destroy the walls of her college room to evade capture from Mr. Negative. The most destructive form of her Light blasts however is her 'Supernova' blasts that happens if Dagger has not expelled the excess of her Lightforce, she will unleash a fury of pure Light made of both the Lightforce and the very concept of Light itself which has the capability to completely wipe out an entire city full of vampires..

== Species ==
Cloak and Dagger were considered latent mutants in earlier appearances, whose powers were activated when they were injected with an experimental illegal drug. In later years, they have been listed as mutates, meaning that their powers were derived from an external mutagenic source. This designation was used for them in the Civil War: Battle Damage Report. Some mutants, such as Sunfire, Polaris, and Thunderbird, also required external stimuli to awaken their latent powers.

Uncanny X-Men writer Matt Fraction said, "No, they don't [think of themselves as part of the mutant community], and that's the thing: in a time when there are so few mutants left, can they afford to not at least acknowledge the existence of this community, this family?" In the Utopia crossover, when recruited by Norman Osborn as part of his "Dark X-Men", Cloak and Dagger comment that they are not mutants. This is confirmed by Doctor Nemesis, who runs a full range of genetics scans on Dagger, reporting that her powers were derived solely from the drug that changed her and Cloak.

== Reception ==
=== Accolades ===
- In 2017, Screen Rant ranked Cloak 10th in their "15 Most Powerful Teleporting Superheroes" list.
- In 2020, Scary Mommy included Dagger in their "Looking For A Role Model? These 195+ Marvel Female Characters Are Truly Heroic" list.
- In 2020, Comic Book Resources (CBR) ranked Cloak and Dagger 14th in their "25 Best Anti-Heroes In Marvel Comics" list.
- In 2022, Screen Rant included Cloak and Dagger in their "10 Best X-Men Who Aren't Mutants" list and in their "10 Best Marvel Characters Who Made Their Debut In Spider-Man Comics" list.
- In 2022, CBR ranked Cloak 9th in their "10 Strongest Black Superheroes" list.

== Other versions ==
=== Age of Apocalypse ===
Alternate universe versions of Cloak and Dagger from Earth-295 who were brainwashed into joining the Sinister Six appear in Age of Apocalypse.

=== House of M ===
An alternate universe version of Cloak from Earth-58163 appears in House of M. This version is a member of Luke Cage's resistance against the mutant-led society and regards him as a father figure.

=== League of Losers ===
Dagger features in an arc of Robert Kirkman's Marvel Team-Up vol. 3, featuring a group of C-list heroes dubbed "The League of Losers". A group of heroes including Speedball, Darkhawk, Dagger, Araña, Gravity, X-23, Sleepwalker, and Terror go to the future to prevent the villain Chronok from stealing Reed Richards' time machine, Chronok having come to the present and already having killed all of Marvel's major heroes.

=== Marvel Zombies ===
Zombified alternate universe versions of Cloak and Dagger from Earth-2149 appear in the Marvel Zombies series.

=== Secret Wars (2015) ===
In "Secret Wars", several alternate universe versions of Cloak and Dagger reside in the domains of Battleworld:

- In the Battleworld domain of the Regency, Cloak was among the superheroes killed by Regent.
- A version of Cloak and Dagger came from the Battleworld domain of Arachnia (Earth-22191). They are depicted as siblings and have opposite powers. They are students of the Victor von Doom Institute for Gifted Youths.
- A version of Cloak and Dagger resided in the Battleworld domain of the Kingdom of Manhattan. They are seen as members of the Young Ultimates.
- A version of Cloak and Dagger resided in the Battleworld domain of the Warzone (Earth-32323). Cloak is killed by the self-destructing Prison 42 after failing to close a portal to the Negative Zone.

=== Spider-Ham ===
Croak and Badger, funny animal versions of Cloak and Dagger from Earth-8311, appear in Spider-Ham.

=== Ultimate Marvel ===
Alternate universe versions of Cloak and Dagger from Earth-1610 appear in the Ultimate Marvel universe. These versions are high school sweethearts who were critically injured in a car accident while traveling to senior prom. Roxxon had them declared legally dead, and Phillip Roxxon used them in experiments with dark matter, resulting in them gaining superpowers.

=== "Universe X" ===
In the 2000 miniseries Universe X, Ty Johnson is dead, but his cloak is still carried by Dagger. Mar-Vell is given the cloak by Dagger and uses it as a teleportation device and a gateway to the Realm of the Dead.

== In other media ==
=== Television ===
- Cloak and Dagger appear in Ultimate Spider-Man, voiced by Phil LaMarr and Ashley Eckstein respectively. These versions are initially members of Taskmaster's Thunderbolts before Spider-Man convinces them to defect to his New Warriors.
- Cloak and Dagger appear in television series set in the Marvel Cinematic Universe (MCU), portrayed by Aubrey Joseph and Olivia Holt as young adults respectively, and Maceo Smedley and Rachel Ryals as children respectively.
  - They first appear in a self-titled TV series, which relocated them to a post-Hurricane Katrina New Orleans and depicted them developing their powers after being exposed to mysterious energy released when the Roxxon Gulf Platform collapsed.
  - The duo also appear in the third season of Runaways, wherein they help the eponymous Runaways rescue Alex Wilder.
- Cloak and Dagger appear in Spider-Man, with Aubrey Joseph and Olivia Holt reprising their respective roles. These versions gained their powers after being experimented on by Alchemax and Tiberius Stone.
- Cloak and Dagger appear in the X-Men '97 episode "Tolerance is Extinction - Part 3".

=== Film ===
In May 2001, Dimension Films signed a deal to create a live-action Cloak and Dagger film, written by David Tischman, produced by Marvel Studios president Avi Arad and Rick Alexander, and executive produced by Kevin Feige. In 2006, Cloak and Dagger were chosen as one of the many properties in Marvel's film deal with Paramount Pictures.

=== Video games ===
- Cloak and Dagger appear as assist characters in Spider-Man and Venom: Maximum Carnage.
- Cloak and Dagger appear as non-player characters (NPCs) and bosses in Marvel: Ultimate Alliance 2, voiced by Ahmed Best and America Young respectively.
- Cloak and Dagger appear as NPCs in Marvel Heroes, voiced by Rick D. Wasserman and Tara Strong respectively.
- Cloak and Dagger appear as hybrid playable characters in Marvel Avengers Alliance.
- Cloak and Dagger appear as playable characters in Marvel Puzzle Quest.
- Cloak and Dagger appear as playable characters in Marvel Avengers Academy.
- Cloak and Dagger appear as playable characters in Lego Marvel Super Heroes 2 via a self-titled DLC pack.
- Cloak and Dagger appear in Marvel Snap.
- Cloak and Dagger appear as hybrid playable characters in Marvel Rivals, voiced by Hakeem Ysaguirre and Xanthe Huynh respectively.

=== Miscellaneous ===
Cloak and Dagger appear in the Wolverine versus Sabretooth motion comic, voiced by Adrian Holmes and Mariee Devereux respectively.

=== Merchandise ===
- In 1997, Toy Biz released a Cloak and Dagger 5" figure box set containing a "collector tin".
- In September 2013, Marvel Universe released Cloak and Dagger action figures in wave 23.
- In 2018, Hasbro released action figures of Cloak and Dagger in their Marvel Legends line.

== Collected editions ==
Title	Material collected	Year	ISBN
Cloak & Dagger: Crime and Punishment	Peter Parker, the Spectacular Spider-Man #64, 69–70, 81–82, 94–96; Marvel Team-Up Annual #6; Marvel Fanfare #19	June 2012	978-0785161295
Cloak & Dagger: Child of Darkness, Child of Light	Cloak & Dagger (vol. 1) #1-4	May 2009	978-0785137832
Cloak & Dagger: Shadows and Light	Peter Parker, The Spectacular Spider-Man #64, 69–70, 81–82, 94–96; Cloak & Dagger (vol. 1) #1-4; Marvel Team-Up Annual #6; Marvel Fanfare #19; New Mutants (vol. 1) #23-25	February 2017	978-1302904241
Cloak & Dagger: Lost and Found	Cloak & Dagger (vol. 2) #1-11; Strange Tales (vol. 2) #1-2	March 2017	978-1302904234
Cloak & Dagger: Runaways and Reversals	Runaways (vol. 1) #11-12; Runaways (vol. 2) #9-12; Cloak and Dagger (vol. 4) #1; Spider-Island Cloak and Dagger #1-3; Amazing Spider-Man (vol. 3) #6-8; material from Strange Tales: Dark Corners; Marvel Knights Double Shot #3; Dark X-Men: The Beginning #2; Amazing Spider-Man #663; Amazing Spider-Man Annual (vol. 3) #1	March 2018	978-1302910587
Cloak & Dagger: Predator and Prey	Strange Tales (vol. 2) #3-6 (A Stories), #7, #8-19 (A Stories); Marvel Graphic Novel #34 - Cloak & Dagger: Predator and Prey; Marvel Graphic Novel: Cloak & Dagger and Power Pack: Shelter From the Storm; Mutant Misadventures of Cloak & Dagger #1-4	August 2018	978-1302913892
Cloak & Dagger: Agony and Ecstasy	Mutant Misadventures of Cloak & Dagger #5-13; Cloak and Dagger (vol. 3) 14-19; Doctor Strange (vol. 2) #78	June 2019	978-1302918811
Cloak & Dagger Omnibus Vol. 1	Peter Parker, The Spectacular Spider-Man (#64, 69-70, 81-82, 94-96; Cloak and Dagger (vol. 1) #1-4; Marvel Team-Up Annual #6; Marvel Fanfare #19; New Mutants (vol. 1) #23-25; Cloak And Dagger (vol. 2) #1-11; Doctor Strange (vol. 2) #78; Marvel Graphic Novel: Cloak And Dagger/Power Pack - Shelter From The Storm; material from Strange Tales (vol. 2) #1-2	September 2020	978-1302924669
Cloak & Dagger Omnibus Vol. 2	Marvel Graphic Novel: Cloak and Dagger - Predator and Prey, Strange Tales (vol. 2) #7, Mutant Misadventures of Cloak and Dagger #1-13, Cloak and Dagger (vol. 3) 14-19, and material from Strange Tales (vol. 2) #3-6 and 8-19	November 2021	978-1302930677
Cloak & Dagger: Shades of Gray	Cloak and Dagger: Marvel Digital Original - Shades of Gray #1-3	December 2018	978-1302911614
Cloak & Dagger: Negative Exposure	Cloak and Dagger: Marvel Digital Original - Negative Exposure #1-3	April 2019	978-1302915100
