= Jason Macendale =

Jason Macendale Jack O'Lantern / Hobgoblin
- Interior artwork of The Amazing Spider-Man #289 (June 1987); Art by Alan Kupperberg

Publication information
- Publisher: Marvel Comics
- First appearance: As Jack O'Lantern: Machine Man #19 (February 1981); As Hobgoblin: The Amazing Spider-Man #289 (June 1987)
- Created by: Tom DeFalco; Steve Ditko

In-story information
- Full name: Jason Philip Macendale, Jr.
- Species: Human mutate-cyborg
- Place of origin: Boston, Massachusetts
- Team affiliations: Army of Evil; Sinister Six
- Partnerships: Gaunt
- Notable aliases: Jack O'Lantern, Hobgoblin
- Abilities: Highly trained hand-to-hand combatant, martial artist, and spy Expert mechanical engineer and physicist Superhuman physical abilities due to Kraven the Hunter's formula and cybernetic implants. Use of various goblin-themed weapons and paraphernalia When possessed by demon: Superhuman strength, speed, and agility Hellfire powers Ability to create organic fibers

Jason Philip Macendale Jr. (/ˈmeɪsəndeɪl/) is a fictional character appearing in American comic books published by Marvel Comics.

== Publication history ==
The character first appears in Machine Man #19 (Feb. 1981), created by writer Tom DeFalco and artist Steve Ditko.

From 1987 to 1997, Macendale initially wielded only the Hobgoblin identity and weaponry but the 1988–89 Inferno crossover writer Gerry Conway had Macendale imbued with demonic powers by N'astirh. In addition to power over hellfire and increased strength and speed far greater than the original Hobgoblin, these powers also disfigure Macendale so that his head is even more grotesque than the Hobgoblin mask, and ultimately alters his mind so that he was deluded into thinking that his appearance is normal. Macendale eventually succeeds in purging himself of his demonic powers and was later revamped again with cybernetic implants.

The character was killed off in Spider-Man: Hobgoblin Lives #1 to make room for Roderick Kingsley to take back the Hobgoblin mantle. Writer Roger Stern recounted being initially uncertain of how to resolve the situation of there being two Hobgoblins:

When I was preparing to revisit the Hobgoblin, I went over the story that Howard [Mackie] and JR had done in Spider-Man #68, which was still fairly recent at the time, and I said to the editors, "Wow, they did all this work to revamp the second Hobgoblin—what do you want me to do? I can have Macendale beat my guy [Kingsley], anything you want, because you just went to all this trouble." I heard back and was told that I could open my story by having my guy kill Macendale. That left things pretty open![emphasis in original]

== Fictional character biography ==
Interior artwork of Web of Spider-Man #93 (October 1993) illustrating Jason Macendale as Jack O'Lantern and Hobgoblin. Pencils by Alex Saviuk.

Jason Macendale was a mercenary who was recruited out of college and trained by the CIA and various para-military organizations. Considered a liability due to his violent nature and amoral personality, this rejection turned Macendale to be a mercenary and ultimately a costumed terrorist. He initially assumes the alter ego Jack O'Lantern and battles Machine Man, followed by Spider-Man.

Macendale is hired to retrieve the Hobgoblin's lost battle van, pulling off the mission successfully despite Spider-Man's intervention. Macendale forms an alliance with the Hobgoblin, who ultimately betrays him. Vowing revenge, Macendale hires the Foreigner to have Hobgoblin killed. After Hobgoblin's supposed death, Macendale is given Hobgoblin's weaponry and assumes the Hobgoblin identity.

During the 1989 "Inferno" storyline, Macendale, feeling dejected and humiliated by his recent defeats, offers to sell his soul to the demon N'astirh in exchange for a demon's power. N'astirh fuses Macendale with the demon Demogoblin, granting him magical abilities coupled with a demonic appearance. Blaming his suffering on Spider-Man, Macendale attempts to seek revenge. Macendale defeats Spider-Man easily, but Mary Jane Watson intervenes before he can kill Spider-Man.

Having finally been made into the notorious supervillain he hoped to be at the cost of his humanity, Macendale puts his personal enmity for Spider-Man aside and uses his powers to become a contract killer. Macendale is later stiff-armed by Doctor Octopus into joining the Sinister Six.

Macendale ultimately expels Demogoblin out of his body. When Demogoblin allies with Doppelganger, Macendale is forced to work with Spider-Man to stop them. Macendale later obtains Kraven the Hunter's strength formula, which enables him to easily defeat Demogoblin. Demogoblin is subsequently killed while saving a young child.

After being incarcerated, Macendale is freed by Gaunt, combating against the second Spider-Man (Ben Reilly). In exchange for doing his bidding, Gaunt converts Macendale into a cyborg, which includes removing his left eye and giving him a high-tech cybernetic replacement.

Macendale is taken to trial and found guilty on several counts (including convictions for the original Hobgoblin's acts). He claims that Ned Leeds had been his predecessor. His continued testimony leads to Spider-Man recounting encounters with the original Hobgoblin, and thus realizing that Leeds could not have been Hobgoblin due to him lacking powers. Roderick Kingsley breaks into Macendale's cell, taunting him as an unworthy successor, and then murders him.

During the "Dead No More: The Clone Conspiracy" storyline, Jason Macendale / Hobgoblin is among the villains who are resurrected by Jackal in clone bodies.

== Powers and abilities ==
Jason Macendale originally possessed no superhuman powers, but used similar paraphernalia to the Hobgoblin and the Green Goblin; both his Jack O'Lantern and Hobgoblin personas used a rocket-powered glider, pumpkin bombs, and gauntlet blasters. During the time in which a demon was grafted to him, he had superhuman strength, speed, and agility, as well as hellfire powers enabling him to create weapons and gliders at will. It is implied that his demonic abilities allowed him to create organic fibers strong enough to bind a normal person. After acquiring Kraven the Hunter's formula, Macendale had enhanced his physical abilities to superhuman levels, thanks to anomalies in his blood left over when he and Demogoblin were one, but this formula's effects seemed to have later wore off. His later cybernetically enhanced body thanks to Mendel Stromm further increased his strength, speed, reflexes, durability, and stamina. Macendale had extensive military training in hand-to-hand combat, martial arts, espionage, and knowledge of conventional weaponry. He often used conventional military weapons. When he adopted the Hobgoblin persona, he was able to make improvements to the Goblin gilder's maneuverability by utilizing skills he gained from his master's degrees in both mechanical engineering and physics. Macendale was also a sociopath and a sadist, which led to his dishonorable discharge from the military.

== In other media ==
=== Television ===
- Jason Macendale serves as partial inspiration for Spider-Man' amalgamated incarnation of the Hobgoblin, voiced by Mark Hamill. (Note: Roderick Kingsley had yet to be established as the original Hobgoblin in the comics when Spider-Man: The Animated Series was produced, so the show's version of the character was instead an amalgamation of the original Hobgoblin's personality and ambitions, Jason Macendale's name and mercenary background, and Lefty Donovan's past as a petty crook.)

=== Video games ===
- Jason Macendale as the Hobgoblin appears as a boss in The Amazing Spider-Man.
- Jason Macendale as the Hobgoblin appears in Spider-Man vs. The Kingpin.
- Jason Macendale as the Hobgoblin appears in Spider-Man: The Video Game, voiced by David Hadinger.
- Jason Macendale as the Hobgoblin appears as a boss in The Amazing Spider-Man 2.
- Jason Macendale as the Hobgoblin appears as a boss in Spider-Man: Return of the Sinister Six. This version is a member of the titular team.
- Jason Macendale as Jack O'Lantern appears as a mini-boss in Spider-Man. He is part of the Ravencroft Prison for the Insane level in the Sega Genesis version and in the Coney Island level in the SNES version.
- Jason Macendale as Jack O'Lantern appears as an alternate skin for the Green Goblin in Marvel Heroes.
- Jason Macendale as Jack O'Lantern appears as a boss in Spider-Man Unlimited, voiced by Travis Willingham.
