= Doppelganger (Marvel Comics) =

- Doppelganger, as featured in the artwork for the cover of Spider-Man #24 (Jul, 1992). Art by Mark Bagley.

Publication information
- Publisher: Marvel Comics
- First appearance: The Infinity War #1 (July 1992)
- Created by: Jim Starlin; Ron Lim; Al Milgrom

In-story information
- Place of origin: Dimension of Manifestations
- Team affiliations: Carnage's Family; Spider-Army/Web-Warriors
- Partnerships: Magus; Shriek; Carnage; Demogoblin; Carrion
- Notable aliases: Spider-Doppelganger
- Abilities: Superhuman strength, agility, stamina, reflexes and speed Ability to adhere to solid surfaces Ability to produce razor-sharp organic webbing Hardened talons

The Doppelganger, also called the Spider-Doppelganger, is a supervillain appearing in American comic books published by Marvel Comics. It is a near-mindless duplicate of Spider-Man with a vicious, animal-like mind who primarily acts as a servant to other villains rather than having a full will of its own. Along with Peter Parker's agility, speed, and power to cling to walls, the Spider-Doppelganger possesses greater strength, six arms, talons, and organic web-spinnerets on each forearm that fire "razor-sharp" webbing.

== Publication history ==
Doppelganger first appeared in The Infinity War #1 in 1992 and was created by Jim Starlin, Ron Lim, and Al Milgrom. The character was among several villainous doubles of superheroes (referred to as doppelgängers) who were created by Magus. Spider-Man's battle is unseen, but it is shown that his double (referred to as the "Spider-Doppelganger" or simply "Doppelganger") is killed. The same month, Spider-Man #24 (1992) presented a full version of the battle and revealed that Doppelganger was revived.

The Doppelganger acts as Demogoblin's follower in Web of Spider-Man #94-96 (1992) and then later becomes a pet to the villains Shriek and Carnage in the 1993 storyline Maximum Carnage, where the character was apparently killed. Seventeen years after its apparent death, Doppelganger returned to the series Carnage in 2010.

== Fictional character biography ==
During the events of "The Infinity War", the Magus works with the other-dimensional entity Anthropomorpho to create monstrous "doppelgängers" of Earth's superheroes, creating a small army. Some of these doppelgangers make advance strikes on Earth's heroes, attempting to defeat and then merge with them, taking over the hero's identity. One such Doppelganger is a bloodthirsty, near-mindless duplicate of Spider-Man. The Spider-Doppelganger confronts the hero in a battle that ends up involving Demogoblin and Hobgoblin. Intending to kill Spider-Man, Hobgoblin unintentionally seems to kill Doppelganger instead. After Spider-Man leaves to find help and information, Demogoblin revives Doppelganger with supernatural energy.

Demogoblin recruits Doppelganger as his aid against Spider-Man and Hobgoblin, leading to the pair also encountering Ghost Rider, Blaze, the demonic Deathspawn, and Venom. Separating from Demogoblin, the bestial Doppelganger eventually encounters Carnage and Shriek, the latter of whom adopts the creature as a loyal pet. Joined by Demogoblin and Carrion, the group engages in a campaign of terror and murder. Doppelganger comes to see Shriek as a mother and later defends her from attack by Carnage, who kills Doppelganger.

Doppelganger returns in Carnage #1. Art by Clayton Crain.

Doppelganger turns up alive years later, now capable of some speech and with an altered appearance. Attempting to free Shriek, it fails and is seemingly killed again, only to then wake up on an autopsy table. Shriek and Doppelganger wreak havoc on New York. Carnage overtakes a Colorado town with Doppelganger's aid, but the creature flees after Carnage is captured.

Doppelganger is among the Spiders assembled to help combat Morlun and the Inheritors in the Spider-Verse storyline. The creature eventually reunites with Carnage and Shriek when they form a cult dedicated to worshiping Knull.

== Powers and abilities ==
The Doppelganger's abilities are very similar to Spider-Man's, including superhuman agility, stamina, reflexes, and speed. While Spider-Man's superhuman strength limit is around 10 tons, the Spider-Doppelganger's superior strength can press approximately 65 tons. The creature can also cling to walls and surfaces through will. Instead of relying on artificial web-shooters, it has organic spinnerets that shoot razor-sharp webbing from the palms of its hands. It has two extra sets of arms, each hand possessing hardened talons that can easily tear through human tissue.

The Spider-Doppelganger is savage and largely unintelligent, seemingly limited to animal instinct, although it was capable of following basic instructions from its 'mother' Shriek. When it reappeared years later with a different body, it was capable of rudimentary speech. Its body is also somewhat malleable, although this attribute was not apparent during its earliest stories and Maximum Carnage.

== Reception ==
- In 2022, CBR.com ranked Doppelganger 7th in their "10 Most Violent Spider-Man Villains" list.

== Other versions ==
=== Deadpool Kills the Marvel Universe Again ===
An illusionary version of Doppelganger appears in Deadpool Kills the Marvel Universe Again.

=== Ultimate Spider-Man ===
An alternate universe version of Doppelganger appears in Ultimate Spider-Man. This version is a six-armed clone of Spider-Man created by Doctor Octopus. He attempts to help Spider-Man and Spider-Woman against his maker, but is killed as a result.

== In other media ==
=== Television ===
A hallucinatory version of Doppelganger appears in the Spider-Man: The Animated Series episode "The Wedding".

=== Film ===
Doppelganger makes non-speaking cameo appearances in Spider-Man: Across the Spider-Verse as a member of the Spider-Society.

=== Video games ===
- Doppelganger appears as a boss in Spider-Man and Venom: Maximum Carnage.
- Doppelganger appears as a playable character in Spider-Man Unlimited.

=== Merchandise ===
- Doppelganger received a figure in Toy Biz's Spider-Man Animated Series line in 1996.
- Doppelganger received a figure in Toy Biz's Spider-Man Classics line.
- Doppelganger received a figure in Diamond Select Toys's "Marvel Minimates" line.
- Doppelganger received a figure in Hasbro's Marvel Legends line.
