= If This Be My Destiny...! =

Story arc featuring Marvel Comics superhero Spider-Man

- Cover to The Amazing Spider-Man #33, depicting Spider-Man trapped under heavy machinery. Art by Steve Ditko.
- Publisher: Marvel Comics
- Publication date: December 1965 – February 1966
- Genre: Superhero
- Title(s): The Amazing Spider-Man #31–33
- Main character(s): Spider-Man; Doctor Octopus

Creative team
- Writer(s): Steve Ditko; Stan Lee
- Artist: Steve Ditko
- Letterer: Art Simek
- Colorist: Stan Goldberg
- Editor: Stan Lee

"If This Be My Destiny...!" is a story arc in the Marvel Comics series The Amazing Spider-Man. The three-part story was written by Stan Lee, drawn by Steve Ditko, and published in issues #31–33 (1965–1966). The story arc is regarded as one of the best stories featuring Spider-Man. It is famed for a four-page sequence at the beginning of issue #33 in which Spider-Man is trapped under heavy machinery and agonizingly lifts it in the air. The scene has been adapted in other works featuring Spider-Man, including the 2017 film Spider-Man: Homecoming.

The story follows Peter Parker, the superhero Spider-Man, as he investigates an anonymous criminal mastermind known as the Master Planner while tending to his Aunt May as she suffers from a life-threatening illness. When the Master Planner's henchmen steal the serum that could cure Aunt May, Spider-Man's pursuit of the Master Planner becomes more aggressive and he discovers that the Master Planner is his recurring villain Doctor Octopus. He defeats Doctor Octopus, escapes the villain's headquarters, and cures Aunt May with the serum.

"If This Be My Destiny" features Spider-Man's first day at Empire State University and introduces two major characters of his supporting cast: Harry Osborn and Gwen Stacy. It also progresses the storyline of Spider-Man's romance with Betty Brant as he chooses to push her away. The story continues the common theme in Spider-Man stories of having the character suffer personal misfortunes amid his heroism. It revisits the death of his Uncle Ben, which he feels guilty for not preventing, and his desire to avoid repeating his failure.

== Background and creation ==
Peter Parker, the comic book superhero Spider-Man, was created by Stan Lee and Steve Ditko in 1962 for Marvel Comics. The story arc "If This Be My Destiny" was written by Lee and drawn by Ditko, using the company's Marvel Method where Ditko drew the panels and Lee then added dialogue on top of them. "If This Be My Destiny" introduces two major characters in Spider-Man's supporting cast—Harry Osborn and Gwen Stacy—as it depicts Peter Parker attending university for the first time. It also introduces the minor character Professor Miles Warren, who would later be reintroduced as a supervillain, the Jackal. "If This Be My Destiny" reframes the story in The Amazing Spider-Man #10, the issue in which Spider-Man gives Aunt May a blood transfusion. What was initially a noble act created a new problem for Spider-Man to solve as his blood poisons her.

"If This Be My Destiny" was created at a time when Lee and Ditko were regularly feuding with and avoiding one another. This caused an error in the lead up to "If This Be My Destiny". The henchmen in issue #30 were meant to be working for the story arc's villain, the Master Planner. Because of the lack of communication, Lee mistakenly wrote their dialogue as if they worked for the villain of issue #30, The Cat. This was corrected in issue #31.

The story is known for a sequence in which Spider-Man is trapped under heavy machinery and struggles to lift it from his back. Ditko decided to dramatize the moment and drew Spider-Man trying to lift the machinery in a sequence across four pages. Lee assumed that Ditko would draw Spider-Man lifting the machinery in a single moment instead of a full sequence, and he said that he "almost shouted in triumph" when he first saw Ditko's art. In a 2005 interview, Lee described "If This Be My Destiny" as one of his "all-time favorite stories".

"If This Be My Destiny" was published in The Amazing Spider-Man issues #31–33. The issues' cover dates are listed as December 1965, January 1966, and February 1966, respectively.

== Synopsis ==
The Amazing Spider-Man #31: "If This Be My Destiny...!" begins with Spider-Man fighting masked men armed with knock-out gas, working for the anonymous Master Planner as they get away with a stolen nuclear device and escape into the ocean. The next day, Aunt May falls over and is hospitalized with an unknown illness. Distracted by her condition, Peter Parker is aloof on his first day at Empire State University and alienates his fellow students, including Harry Osborn and Gwen Stacy; not used to being rebuffed, Gwen becomes interested in Peter. At the Daily Bugle, Betty Brant struggles to choose between Peter and Ned Leeds. Reporter Frederick Foswell learns of the stolen device while undercover and flags Spider-Man down to tell him that the next theft will happen at the pier. Spider-Man thwarts them by wearing a gas mask, and they flee into the water.

The Amazing Spider-Man #32: "Man on a Rampage!" reveals that the Master Planner is Doctor Octopus. Peter sees Betty at the Daily Bugle and acts dismissively to scare her away, thinking she would not want to date Spider-Man, but she is not fooled by his act. At the hospital, Peter learns Aunt May was poisoned by the radiation in his blood when he had given her a transfusion. He goes to the scientist Curt Connors, who suggests ordering the ISO-36 serum to treat her. Doctor Octopus also wants the serum and has his men steal the shipment. Spider-Man rampages through criminal hideouts demanding information as Aunt May goes into a coma. Upon finding the Master Planner's underwater headquarters, Spider-Man encounters Doctor Octopus and they fight. Spider-Man fights aggressively and destroys the facility. As it collapses, he is trapped under heavy machinery. Exhausted from the last few days, he watches as water drips in, threatening to wash away the serum.

The Amazing Spider-Man #33: "The Final Chapter!" returns to Spider-Man as he tries to escape from under the machinery. Unwilling to let Aunt May down the way he did his Uncle Ben, Spider-Man struggles under the weight until he triumphantly lifts it over his head. With an injured leg, he fights through more masked men and stumbles into Conners' lab with the serum. Conners creates the medicine and Spider-Man delivers it to the hospital. To distract himself while waiting for the treatment to take effect, he returns to the crime scene to take photographs that he can sell to the Daily Bugle. Encountering Betty, he successfully scares her away by telling her about the danger of his job as a freelance photojournalist. After selling the pictures, Peter returns to the hospital to see Aunt May as she recovers.

== Analysis and themes ==
The main focus of "If This Be My Destiny" is the pressure Spider-Man faces as he balances his many responsibilities. Besides his superhero work and investigating the Master Planner, he also has to manage his classwork in university and tending to his ailing Aunt May. These distractions cause him to eschew a social life and come across as dismissive to his classmates. This reinforced the original premise of Spider-Man's character as a superhero who has to overcome personal misfortunes, encouraging Marvel Comics to publish more tragic stories for the character in the future.

Ditko's Objectivist beliefs influenced his work, and he preferred to have characters overcome challenges through personal strength instead of through dependence on others. His design in "If This Be My Destiny" was to have Spider-Man develop confidence in his self-identity, rather than define himself based on his social status among his classmates. In contrast to the death of his father figure Uncle Ben, which Spider-Man did not prevent, his character matures in "If This Be My Destiny" as he persists in his efforts to protect Aunt May. Aunt May and Uncle Ben become symbols for Spider-Man's grief and fear of failure. Spider-Man shifts from his usual humorous persona as the story builds to one motivated by anger and frustration, and he becomes more aggressive with his opponents. It is his rage against Doctor Octopus that causes him to destroy the underwater headquarters in their battle, and Spider-Man is trapped under a physical weight caused by the emotional weight that he carries. Upon resolving the conflict within himself and finding the emotional strength to continue, he draws upon newfound physical strength to free himself.

The final panel of issue #32 uses a deep focus perspective; Ditko placed the vial in the foreground as the water drips over it, while Spider-Man is crushed under the machinery in the background. Issue #33 opens with small, constrained panels of Spider-Man trapped, but the panels become wider as he processes his emotional turmoil and frees himself, culminating in a single full-page spread when he frees himself.

One frequent theme in Spider-Man stories is that anyone could be Spider-Man, as he is defined by his character rather than his abilities. While lifting the machinery, Spider-Man contemplates whether he deserves the strength he possesses, deciding that he is only worthy if he persists. This reinforces Spider-Man's character as someone who fights to protect others; knowing that Aunt May's life is at risk, he continues fighting even after he seems to be defeated.

== Reception ==
The full-page illustration of Spider-Man lifting the machinery has become an iconic depiction of the character.

The arc is celebrated as one of the best in Spider-Man's publication history. Several comic book writers have praised the story. Batton Lash praised the anatomy of the sequence's final panel and said that there was "no careless brushstroke or pen line" in Ditko's art by the time he drew this story. Matthew K. Manning described it as "an inspiring tale of mind over matter and the power of willpower and determination". In 2019, Kurt Busiek described "If This Be My Destiny" as his favorite Spider-Man story.

Fantasy writer Keith DeCandido cited "If This Be My Destiny" as an example of Spider-Man's weaknesses making him a compelling character, as opposed to a more powerful character such as Superman. Preeti Chhibber of Polygon listed it one of the character's greatest stories and credited it with demonstrating the character's humanity, also commenting on Peter's actions toward Betty, describing it as misogyny typical of its time. The final issue of the story was chosen as #15 in the 100 Greatest Marvels of All Time poll of readers' favorite Marvel comic book issues in 2001. It was the only entry in the top 25 that did not feature the introduction or reintroduction of a superhero.

The sequence of Spider-Man lifting the machinery from his back has become an iconic moment in the history of comic books. Comic book historian Les Daniels said that Ditko "squeezes every ounce of anguish" from the scene, drawing attention particularly to the images of Aunt May and Uncle Ben that appear in front of Spider-Man. Comic book editor Robert Greenberger described the sequence as "a modern-day equivalent to Shakespeare", citing the pacing and Peter's soliloquy. Marvel's marketing consultant Steve Saffel stated the image of Spider-Man lifting the machinery "is one of the most powerful ever to appear in the series" and credited it for influencing future writers and artists. Comic book critic Brian Cronin also praised the sequence after Spider-Man lifts the machinery, in which he fights the masked men. According to Cronin, the art is "so well done that you could still totally see what Peter is thinking just by his body movement".

== In other media ==
=== Television ===
- The animated series The Spectacular Spider-Man (2008–2009) adapted "If This Be My Destiny" in its season two episode "Shear Strength". This episode included both the premise of the Master Planner and an adaptation of the lifting sequence.
- The season one finale of the animated series Your Friendly Neighborhood Spider-Man (2025–present) is named after the eponymous storyline.

=== Film ===
The film Spider-Man: Homecoming (2017) adapted the lifting sequence in a scene where Spider-Man is crushed under rubble, caused by the Vulture destroying pillars and causing the structure they are in to collapse. The film version of the sequence retains the characterization and tone of the comic book version as Spider-Man draws on his strength to prove that he is worthy of his power. His motivation differs in the film; instead of trying to save Aunt May and honor Uncle Ben, Spider-Man is trying to save innocent people from the Vulture and prove himself to Iron Man.

=== Video games ===
The video game Spider-Man (2018) featured a reference to the lifting sequence at the beginning of the game, when Spider-Man lifts rubble to keep it from falling on civilians. The scene is brief and only replicates the visual element of the comic book.

== Collected editions ==
- Marvel Masterworks: The Amazing Spider-Man volume 4 (264 pages, hardcover, Marvel Comics, August 1991, ISBN 978-0785111894)
- The Essential Spider-Man volume 2 (530 pages, softcover, Marvel Comics, July 1997, ISBN 0-7851-0989-7)
- Marvel Visionaries: Steve Ditko (352 pages, hardcover, Marvel Comics, 2005, ISBN 0-7851-1783-0)
- The Amazing Spider-Man Omnibus volume 1 (1096 pages, hardcover, Marvel Comics, April 2007, ISBN 0-7851-2509-4)
- Mighty Marvel Masterworks: The Amazing Spider-Man Vol. 4 – The Master Planner (216 pages, softcover, Marvel Comics, July 2023, ISBN 978-1302948993)
