= Deadline (Marvel Comics) =

2002 Marvel Comics mini-series

- Cover of the 1st issues

Publication information
- Publisher: Marvel Comics
- Format: Mini-series
- Genre: Superhero
- Publication date: June 2002 – September 2002
- No. of issues: 4
- Main character: Daily Bugle

Creative team
- Written by: Bill Rosemann
- Artist: Guy Davis
- Inker: Greg Horn

Deadline is a four-issue mini-series that was printed by Marvel Comics in 2002, chronicling the first appearance of Kat Farrell as a newspaper reporter in New York City, stumbling onto a murder case. Kat works at the Daily Bugle, and dealt with major Bugle employees Betty Brant, Ben Urich, Robbie Robertson and J. Jonah Jameson. The series was written by Bill Rosemann, with art by Guy Davis.

A precursor to The Pulse (a series which also featured Kat as a character), the story focuses on a journalist whose career is centered on superpowered beings (much to Kat's chagrin).

== Issue 1 ==
A reporter at the Bugle named Katherine Farrell covering "Capes"as she comes to call all superpowers individuals hates interviewing super-heroes and wants to move to covering the crime dept. Betty Brant, another worker at the daily bugle, tips her off about a position opening up. She has one week to show them she can land a big story. She investigates a man referred to as Judge "No Hart", a suspect in the murdering of several costumed criminals and his own wife. Her investigation shows that Michael Hart was a former defense attorney specializing in capes and was good in acquitting capes. Later, he was appointed judge and during his tenure, he became known for convicting capes. Later, in his home, his wife was found dead and Michael Hart cannot be found. During the investigation Farrell follows a villain trying to get some type of lead for her case. Unfortunately, in an alley, the villain had noticed her and was waiting for her, before any serious harm was done, the Judge appeared and sucked the life out of the assailant, saving Farrell.

== Issue 2 ==
While still attempting to crack the story of who killed judge Michael Hart's wife and turned him into a super-villain serial killer, Kat Farrell travels to Doctor Pow's "Hospital" in Chinatown. Doctor Pow treats super-criminals. After all her other leads give out, Farrell goes to the Bar with No Name, a bar for super-villains trying to get any resemblance to a lead she can muster up. Farrell is later approached by Hart and tells her what he remembers of the night of his wife's murder and directs her to the Tinkerer for the rest of the answers. The Tinkerer claims that he found a nearly lifeless Hart about three months previously and took him back to his lab to try and save his life. He was successful, but claims that he is not responsible for what can back with the judge. He claims that he wants Farrell to tell the world Michael Hart's story and to tell everyone that he is still seeking justice. Farrell later recounts the entire conversation to her friend and mentor Betty Brant, believing that the Tinkerer is using Hart to find and kill the super-criminal murderer of his son, Rick Mason. While walking home, Farrell realizes that she is being followed by Tombstone and runs into St. Xavier's Church to avoid him. He finds her, however, and relays a message from his employer, the Kingpin, to leave Hart's case alone before something unfortunate happens to her. After Tombstone leaves, Hart again appears before Farrell and asks her to go with him.

== Issue 3 ==
While continuing to search for the killer of Michael Hart's wife, Farrell is taken by Hart, as the Judge, to a realm he calls the "Zeitgeist." The Zeitgeist acts as a purgatory and Farrell witnesses the brutal murders of those who do not realize that they are already dead from various time periods. The last scene she and Hart encounter is the murder of Hart's own wife and despite the Judge's warnings that this is a dangerous place for mortals, Kat attacks the murderer, getting slammed out a window. She is rescued by Hart and wakes up on a park bench in Central Park, still clutching the candlestick that she attacked the murderer with. When she arrives home, she is shocked to open a package containing the dead body of her stolen pet goldfish.

== Issue 4 ==
The police investigate Farrell's apartment after she was sent a package containing her dead goldfish which had been stolen days earlier. Later that day, she questions the doorman at Michael Hart's apartment building and discovers that Hart had been helped out of the building by a "friend" on the night he went missing. The doorman was told that he was drunk and was being taken to sleep it off. Back at her apartment, Farrell speaks to her nosy neighbor and discovers that the perpetrator in her apartment was actually a reporter from the Bugle. After she identified Paul Swanson, he is arrested and fired from his job at the Bugle. Afterwards, Farrell goes for a walk with Ben Urich, and he tells her that she reminds him of himself as a young reporter. The next day, Farrell puts some facts together and visits the tinkerer. she promptly accuses the Tinkerer of attacking Hart and killing his wife in retaliation for a super-criminal that Hart had defended as a lawyer who had killed his son. As the Tinkerer our ready to attack farrel the judge stops the conflict saving her in the process. The Tinkerer then after a brief period confesses to having accidentally killed Hart's wife and injuring him before taking him back to his lab to save his life. The Judge enraged attempts to kill the tinkerer but ultimately decided agent this. figuring they could do more good working together. Farrell ultimately decides not to publish her story to prevent the tinkerer from ending up in prison. then the final panels are of farrell explaining her choice to not publish the story to Urich and Mrs. Brant . With Urich explaining a similar time he ultimately decided against running a story to protect the identity of a superpower individual.
