= Glory Grant =

Marvel Comics character

- Glory Grant, as depicted in a pin-up of The Amazing Spider-Man Annual #16 (December 1982). Art by John Romita Jr.

Publication information
- Publisher: Marvel Comics
- First appearance: The Amazing Spider-Man #140 (January 1975)
- Created by: Gerry Conway (writer); Ross Andru (artist)

In-story information
- Full name: Gloriana Grant
- Team affiliations: Daily Bugle
- Supporting character of: Spider-Man; Spider-Woman

Gloriana "Glory" Grant is a fictional character appearing in American comic books published by Marvel Comics. She is usually depicted as a supporting character of Spider-Man. She is introduced in The Amazing Spider-Man #140 (January 1975) as a neighbor of Peter Parker. Peter then helps her secure a position as J. Jonah Jameson's secretary at the Daily Bugle, replacing Betty Brant.

The character made her cinematic debut in Spider-Man: Across the Spider-Verse (2023), voiced by Ayo Edebiri.

== Publication history ==
Glory Grant first appeared in The Amazing Spider-Man #140 (January 1975) and was created by Gerry Conway and Ross Andru.

== Fictional character biography ==
When first introduced, Glory Grant is pursuing a modeling career and meets Daily Bugle photographer Peter Parker who has just moved into her Lower West Side apartment building. They then become fast friends. When Glory is looking for work, Peter brought her to the Daily Bugle where the publisher J. Jonah Jameson has been going through secretaries since the departure of his long-time secretary Betty Brant. She works for Jameson and, later, Robbie Robertson who becomes editor-in-chief.

Grant falls in love with gang boss Eduardo Lobo. He and his brother Carlos wage a gang war against the Kingpin, and he uses Glory to access the Daily Bugle's research files on the Kingpin. However, he falls in love with her, and Glory is conflicted over the romance. Peter suggests she follow her heart. When Eduardo ends up battling Spider-Man, Glory shoots and kills Eduardo with a silver bullet. Spider-Man thanks her but she reveals that she was aiming at Spider-Man, having followed her heart as Peter suggested.

Despite Glory harboring a deep resentment for Spider-Man, he helps her and government agent Shotgun against the late voodoo witch Calypso, who spiritually possesses Grant long enough to engineer a scheme that brings Calypso fully back from the dead.

When Jameson becomes Mayor of Manhattan, Grant becomes one of his aides, appearing with him at the Raft on the day of Alistair Smythe's execution. However, she later quit his administration when she saw that Jameson would never end his personal vendetta against Spider-Man.

== Other versions ==
=== Marvel Noir ===
An alternate universe version of Glory Grant appears in the Marvel Noir story Spider-Man: Eyes Without a Face. This version is the girlfriend of Robbie Robertson.

=== Spider-Gwen ===
An alternate universe version of Glory Grant from Earth-65 appears in Spider-Gwen. This version is a teenager, friend of Gwen Stacy, and member of a band called the Mary Janes.

== In other media ==
=== Television ===
- Rita Conway, a character based on Glory Grant, appears in The Amazing Spider-Man, portrayed by Chip Fields.
- Glory Grant appears in Spider-Man: The Animated Series, voiced by Nell Carter. This version is a secretary at the Daily Bugle.
- Glory Grant appears in The Spectacular Spider-Man, voiced by Cree Summer. This version is a teenager, classmate of Peter Parker at Midtown High, and Kenny Kong's girlfriend.
- Glory Grant appears in Marvel Rising: Initiation, voiced by Skai Jackson. Similar to her Earth-65 incarnation, this version is the teenage bandmate of Gwen Stacy.

=== Film ===
Glory Grant appears in Spider-Man: Across the Spider-Verse, voiced by Ayo Edebiri.
