= Ned Leeds =

Comic book character

- Ned Leeds, in The Amazing Spider-Man vol. 1 #245 (October 1983). Art by John Romita Jr.

Publication information
- Publisher: Marvel Comics
- First appearance: Anonymous cameo: The Amazing Spider-Man #18 (November 1964) as Ned Leeds: The Amazing Spider-Man #19 (December 1964)
- Created by: Stan Lee (writer); Steve Ditko (artist)

In-story information
- Full name: Edward "Ned" Leeds
- Species: Human mutate
- Place of origin: Huntington, New York
- Team affiliations: Daily Bugle
- Supporting character of: Spider-Man; Baron Mordo
- Notable aliases: Hobgoblin
- Abilities: Expert As the Hobgoblin: Use of goblin-themed weapons and paraphernalia; Enhanced strength, speed, durability, and healing; Wields chaos magic

Edward "Ned" Leeds is a character appearing in American comic books published by Marvel Comics, usually as a supporting character in stories featuring the superhero Spider-Man. Leeds is a reporter for the Daily Bugle and the husband of Betty Brant. In 1987, Leeds was revealed to be the alter ego of the supervillain Hobgoblin shortly after he was killed off in an assassination. In 1997, Leeds was retroactively established to have been a brainwashed stand-in for Roderick Kingsley, the original Hobgoblin. Leeds was revived in a 2018–2022 storyline in which he served the Queen Goblin as the Hobgoblin. Synergetic with his MCU adaptation, Leeds is revealed to be a sorcerer who trained with Baron Mordo to learn chaos magic.

Jacob Batalon portrays Ned Leeds in the Marvel Cinematic Universe (MCU), appearing in Spider-Man: Homecoming (2017), Avengers: Infinity War (2018), Avengers: Endgame and Spider-Man: Far From Home (both 2019), the web series The Daily Bugle and Spider-Man: No Way Home (both 2021), and returned in Spider-Man: Brand New Day (2026).

== Publication history ==
Created by Stan Lee and Steve Ditko, Ned Leeds made his first appearance in The Amazing Spider-Man #18 (November 1964) as an unnamed employee at the Daily Bugle. In the following issue, he is introduced to Peter by Betty as Ned Leeds.

His character is killed off in the one-shot Spider-Man vs. Wolverine (February 1987), written by then Spider-Man editor Jim Owsley. Tom DeFalco, Ron Frenz, and Peter David (of the creative teams on the ongoing Spider-Man books) found this objectionable, saying that Owsley gave them no warning that he was going to kill Leeds, then a regular cast member in the Spider-Man books. Frenz remarked:

Owsley let Tom [DeFalco] and I continue with our plans without telling us in advance that he was going to kill Ned. We had no heads up until Spider-Man vs. Wolverine came out that Ned Leeds was killed in that story. I can't speak to why he did it, but I can speak to the way he did it. He kept it a big secret until we felt screwed.

Leeds was revealed to be the Hobgoblin in The Amazing Spider-Man #289.

== Fictional character biography ==
Ned Leeds was a reporter for the Daily Bugle. He and Peter Parker compete for the affections of Daily Bugle secretary Betty Brant, but Peter drops out of the running due to realizing that Brant will not be able to accept Spider-Man's double identity. He would win outright when Brant goes into stress induced shock after J. Jonah Jameson is attacked by the Scorpion. Leeds and Brant are married shortly after. However, the couple's marriage is often strained, eventually becoming abusive.

When Spider-Man battles the Hobgoblin, Leeds follows Hobgoblin to a hideout. When Hobgoblin realizes Leeds is present, Leeds is captured and brainwashed to act as a scapegoat in case Hobgoblin is exposed. Leeds's brainwashing causes his marriage with Brant and professional relationships to fall apart. Increasingly mentally unstable, Leeds drives Brant to seek solace in Flash Thompson. While Thompson makes statements about Hobgoblin and events are staged so Thompson is revealed as the enigmatic villain, Leeds and Fisk reach a disagreement. Leeds decides to turn Fisk in to the Kingpin.

After Thompson is cleared of being framed, the New York underworld empire is known that Leeds is actually Hobgoblin and that he will soon be traveling to Berlin. Leeds and Peter go on an assignment in Berlin, where Leeds is murdered by the Foreigner at Jason Macendale's request.

During the "Dead No More: The Clone Conspiracy" storyline, a clone of Ned Leeds is created by Ben Reilly. Leeds is among the few surviving clones after many of them die from the Carrion virus; he later disguises himself as a hobo to continue watching over Betty Brant. The clone later dies during a conflict between Spider-Man, Rhino, Taskmaster, and Black Ant.

In Symbiote Spider-Man: Alien Reality, set before Leeds's death, Leeds is revealed to have become the sorcerer apprentice of Baron Mordo while serving as Hobgoblin, training under him in the art of reality-altering chaos magic. While assisting Mordo in reshaping reality to make Mordo Sorcerer Supreme, Leeds also makes himself Spider-Man's main archenemy, before luring Spider-Man to the Sanctum Sanctorum to do battle with him, killing his Aunt May in front of Peter's newly resurrected uncle. Swearing revenge, Peter retreats into his own body, with Venom taking over his body. Venom trains for years in a pocket dimension with Doctor Strange to defeat Leeds, eventually traveling into the realm of Nightmare to return reality to its normal state. Peter and Leeds both lose their memories of the alternate reality as a result.

Leeds is revealed to have been alive all along, his body having resurrected immediately following his assassination due to him having ingested Norman Osborn's Goblin Formula beforehand. After spending years in hiding, stalking Betty Brant, he reveals himself to her and convinces her to let him back into her life, getting back together with her and eventually even having a child together. In "The Hobgoblins' Last Stand", both Leeds and Kingsley are both turned into Hobgoblin by the Queen Goblin, serving as her enforcers.

== Powers and abilities ==
Ned Leeds had a Bachelor of Arts degree in Journalism, and was a master of deductive reasoning and investigation. He was a normal man who engaged in regular exercise, which increased to more intensive levels after assuming the Hobgoblin role. As the Hobgoblin, Ned wore his signature uniform and used the glider and equipment which included Jack O'Lantern bombs, razor bats and electrical shock gloves. However, he had no healing factor or superhuman strength, prior to ingesting the Goblin Formula, after which he developed superhuman strength, speed, reflexes, and stamina as well as a low-level rapid healing factor that allows him to survive otherwise fatal wounds.

== Other versions ==
=== Ultimate Marvel ===
An alternate universe version of Ned Leeds from Earth-1610 appears in Ultimate Spider-Man #121. This version is an alcoholic Daily Bugle reporter who has an antagonistic relationship with Betty Brant.

=== Spider-Man Loves Mary Jane ===
A teenage alternate universe version of Ned Leeds appears in Spider-Man Loves Mary Jane. This version is the boyfriend of Betty Brant who previously dated Mary Jane Watson.

== In other media ==
=== Television ===
- Ned Leeds appears in Spider-Man: The Animated Series, voiced by Bob Bergen. This version is a reporter for the Daily Bugle.
- The character renamed Ned Lee appears in The Spectacular Spider-Man, voiced by Andrew Kishino. This version is a Korean-American reporter for the Daily Bugle who is convinced that he can uncover Spider-Man's secret identity and that the Green Goblin is connected. He also displays an attraction to his co-worker Betty Brant. He primarily makes minor appearances, investigating leads on Spider-Man's identity throughout the series, most notably determining it cannot be Peter Parker after Venom tried unsuccessfully to out the hero's identity.

=== Film ===
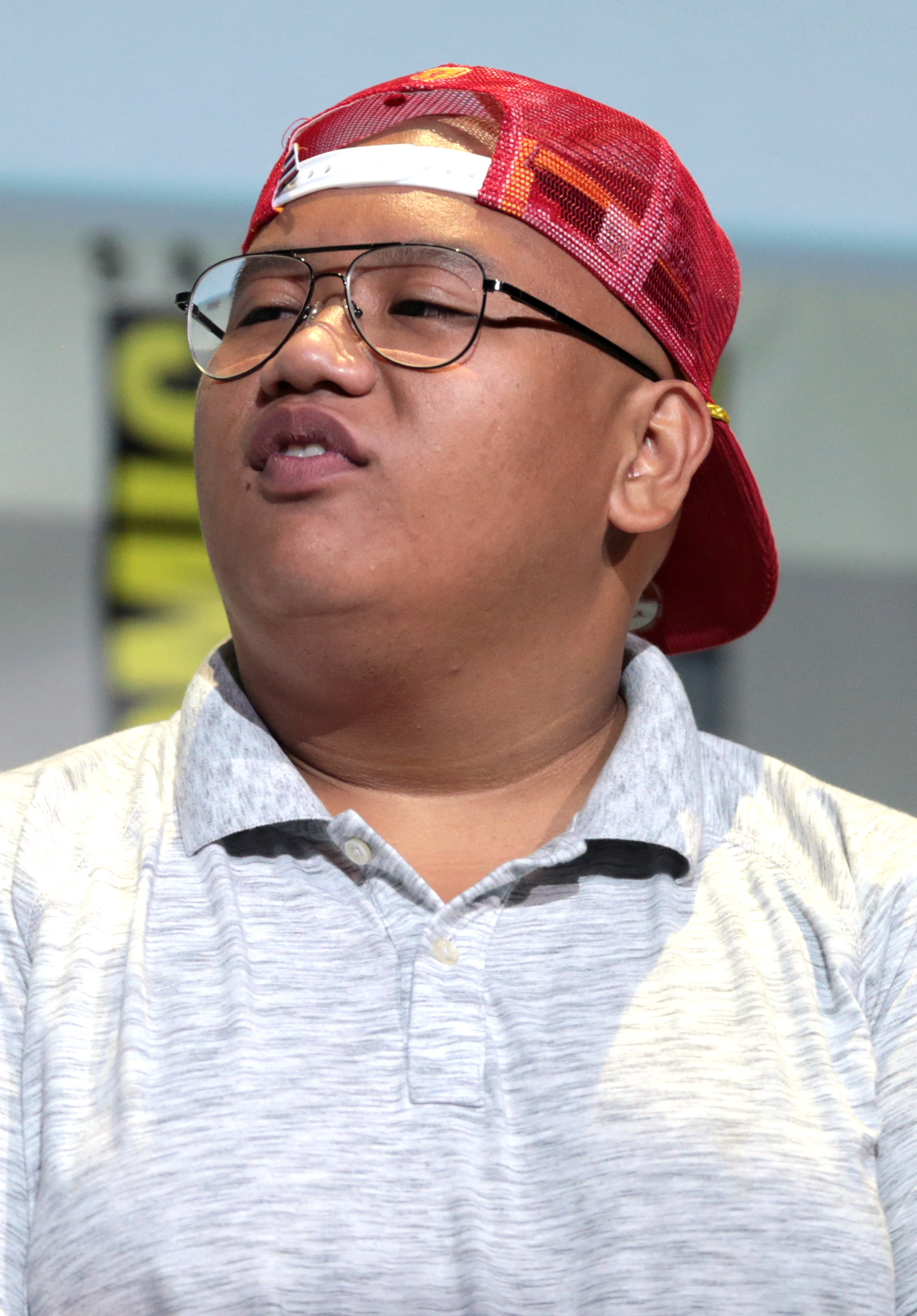
Actor Jacob Batalon portrayed Ned Leeds in the Marvel Cinematic Universe.

- Ned Leeds appears in films set in the Marvel Cinematic Universe (MCU), portrayed by Jacob Batalon. This version is Filipino-American and Peter Parker's best friend who is initially unaware of the latter's secret identity as Spider-Man and is inspired by Miles Morales' best friend in the comics, Ganke Lee.
  - Introduced in Spider-Man: Homecoming, Leeds is a student at the Midtown School of Science and Technology alongside Parker and a member of the Academic Decathlon team. After discovering Parker's secret identity, he begins supporting him as his self-proclaimed "guy in the chair", to help him in his quest to find and defeat the Vulture before he could sell high-tech hybrid weapons to the criminal underworld.
  - Leeds makes a cameo appearance in Avengers: Infinity War, aiding Parker by distracting their classmates so the latter can leave and help the Avengers.
  - Leeds makes a voiceless cameo appearance in Avengers: Endgame, where he reunites with Parker after the two are resurrected from the Blip.
  - In Spider-Man: Far From Home, Leeds becomes romantically involved with classmate Betty Brant despite his initial claims of being a single bachelor throughout a school field trip to Europe while supporting Parker's feelings for MJ. When their journey was cut short due to the Elemental Crisis, Leeds would do his best to cover for Parker while he investigated and fought the perpetrator, Mysterio, so that his secret identity as Spider-Man would not be revealed. After Leeds learned that MJ also discovered Parker's secret identity, he, MJ, and Happy Hogan teamed up alongside Brant and Flash Thompson to escape from the Stark Industries Combat Drones sent by Mysterio before being saved by Spider-Man. Following the end of the trip, Leeds and Brant mutually break up and remain friends.
  - In Spider-Man: No Way Home, Leeds, Parker, and MJ have trouble applying to colleges after Mysterio publicly exposed Parker's identity. Parker seeks help from Doctor Strange for help in making everyone forget. However, Strange's spell backfires and pulls in supervillains who fought Spider-Man from across the multiverse. Strange tasks Parker, Leeds, and MJ with capturing the villains, but Parker traps Strange in the Mirror Dimension in an attempt to reform the villains. While using Strange's Sling Ring to find Parker, Leeds and MJ encounter two alternate universe variants of Parker that they nickname "Peter-Two" and "Peter-Three". Once the three Spider-Men defeat and cure the villains, Strange returns the displaced individuals to their respective home universes before Parker asks him to erase all memory of the latter from everyone in their universe, resulting in Leeds forgetting his friendship with Parker and Spider-Man's secret identity. Weeks after forgetting Parker, Leeds greets MJ at her store, and they are both accepted to MIT.
  - In Spider-Man: Brand New Day, after graduating from MIT, Leeds and MJ rented an apartment together in New York City. During the housewarming party, Leeds shows up with Parker, who had brought flowers as a welcome gift and presented them to him before introducing himself as Maynard, pretending to be a neighbor. He demonstrates his invention called the "Spidey Tracker", designed to track Spider-Man's location, and tries to uncover his identity. Leeds notices that MJ invited Spider-Man to spend time with him, upon hearing about the experience with the telepath named Jean Grey, realizing that the director of the DODC, Bill Metzger, had lied to Spider-Man about Jean's motives, and rushes off to rescue her after his conversation with Yelena Belova. After Jean loses control of her abilities by psionically locking down the city around her, Leeds and MJ are frozen in place. When things return to normal, Leeds views a news report stating that Spider-Man was seriously injured, and he reunites with Parker, who finally remembers him with his secret handshake.
- An alternate universe version of Ned Leeds from Earth-65 makes a minor non-speaking appearance in Spider-Man: Across the Spider-Verse as one of Peter Parker's bullies.

=== Video games ===
Ned Leeds as the Hobgoblin appears in The Amazing Spider-Man and Captain America in Dr. Doom's Revenge!.

=== Miscellaneous ===
The Ned Leeds incarnation of the Hobgoblin appears in The Amazing Adventures of Spider-Man, voiced by Pat Fraley.
