= Hobgoblin (Marvel Comics) =

Marvel Comics fictional character

- The original Hobgoblin in The Amazing Spider-Man #238 (March 1983). Art by John Romita Sr. and John Romita Jr.

Publication information
- Publisher: Marvel Comics
- First appearance: The Amazing Spider-Man #238 (March 1983)
- Created by: Roger Stern; John Romita Jr.

In-story information
- Alter ego: Roderick Kingsley; Ned Leeds; Jason Macendale; Phil Urich
- Species: Human mutate (Note: In Marvel Comics, the term "mutate" is used as a noun to designate characters that received superpowers from an external source, as opposed to Marvel's mutants.)
- Abilities: Criminal mastermind; Superhuman strength, intelligence, speed, durability, and healing; Uses Halloween-themed paraphernalia, high-tech gadgetry, and a Goblin Glider equipped with various weapons

The Hobgoblin is the alias of several supervillains appearing in American comic books published by Marvel Comics, most of whom are depicted as enemies of the superhero Spider-Man and belong to the collective of adversaries that make up his rogues gallery. Created by writer Roger Stern and artist John Romita Jr., the original Hobgoblin first appeared in The Amazing Spider-Man #238 (1983) as a criminal mastermind equipped with an arsenal of Halloween-themed weapons similar to those used by the Green Goblin, including grenade-like Pumpkin Bombs, razor-sharp bat-shaped blades, and a flying Goblin Glider. Having perfected the experimental chemical formula that transformed Norman Osborn into the Green Goblin, the Hobgoblin possesses Osborn's enhanced strength and intelligence without his insanity, and vies to take control of New York City's criminal underworld.

The original Hobgoblin's true identity was one of the longest-running mysteries in Spider-Man comics, as he often used brainwashed body doubles and stand-ins. Stern's original plan was for the character's alter ego to be Roderick Kingsley, an amoral billionaire fashion designer and Mary Jane Watson's former boss, but editorial conflicts following Stern's departure from Marvel led to the Hobgoblin instead being revealed as Ned Leeds, Peter Parker's journalist co-worker at the Daily Bugle, in 1987. Stern was dissatisfied with this revelation and, upon returning to Marvel in 1997, retroactively established Kingsley as the original Hobgoblin with Leeds reframed as one of Kingsley's many fall guys. Other characters that have been framed or manipulated into serving as Kingsley's decoys over the years include Lefty Donovan, Flash Thompson, his twin brother Daniel Kingsley, and his butler Claude.

The Hobgoblin mantle has also been assumed independently of Kingsley by Jason Macendale and Phil Urich, while Robin Borne and Harry Osborn have adopted the persona in alternate continuities.

The Hobgoblin has been adapted in various media incarnations, including television series and video games.

== Publication history ==
Cover of The Amazing Spider-Man #238 (March 1983), which featured the Hobgoblin's debut. Art by John Romita Sr..

The Hobgoblin was created by writer Roger Stern and artist John Romita Jr. for The Amazing Spider-Man #238 (March 1983). Like other writers, Stern found himself under pressure to have Spider-Man fight the Green Goblin again, but did not wish to bring Norman Osborn or Bart Hamilton back from the dead, have Harry Osborn be a villain again, or create yet another Green Goblin. Stern instead created a new goblin as heir to the Green Goblin's legacy and developed the Hobgoblin. Stern recounts that he directed Romita to base the costume on the Green Goblin's costume but to make it "a little more medieval-looking", while Romita asserts that he was given no direction beyond using the Green Goblin as a basis. Both agree, however, that the costume was chiefly Romita's design.

The Hobgoblin's identity was not initially revealed, generating one of the longest-running mysteries in the Spider-Man comics. According to Stern, "I plotted that first story with no strong idea of who the Hobgoblin was. As I was scripting those gorgeous pages from [John Romita, Jr.], particularly the last third of the book, and developing the Hobgoblin's speech pattern, I realized who he was. It was Roderick Kingsley, that sunuvabitch corporate leader I had introduced in my first issue of [The] Spectacular [Spider-Man]." A handful of readers deduced that Kingsley was the Hobgoblin almost immediately. To throw them off the scent and in the same stroke provide a retroactive explanation for Kingsley's inconsistent characterization in his early appearances, Stern came up with the idea of Kingsley having a brother named Daniel who sometimes impersonates him, sealing the deception by having the Hobgoblin conspicuously appear in the same room as Daniel Kingsley in The Amazing Spider-Man #249.

Stern's original plan was to have the Hobgoblin's mystery identity run exactly one issue longer than that of the Green Goblin's identity, meaning the truth would be revealed in The Amazing Spider-Man #264. However, Stern left after The Amazing Spider-Man #251, and editor Tom DeFalco took his place. Wanting to resolve the mystery in a manner that would do justice to Stern's stories, DeFalco asked Stern who the Hobgoblin was, but objected when Stern said it was Kingsley. DeFalco argued that the "twin brother" scheme was cheating the readers since there had been no hint that Roderick even had a brother (aside from a single thought bubble), much less one who could serve as a body double. Stern disagreed but said that DeFalco should feel free to choose whoever he wanted for the Hobgoblin's secret identity, reasoning that "I knew that whomever Tom chose, he would make it work." Upon reviewing the clues, DeFalco decided that the Hobgoblin was Richard Fisk. He opted to prolong the mystery of his identity as long as possible, since it was the chief element that made the Hobgoblin interesting. Through both Stern and DeFalco's runs, the answer was continuously teased on the cover art, with the covers of The Amazing Spider-Man #245, 251, and 276 all showing Spider-Man having unmasked the Hobgoblin.

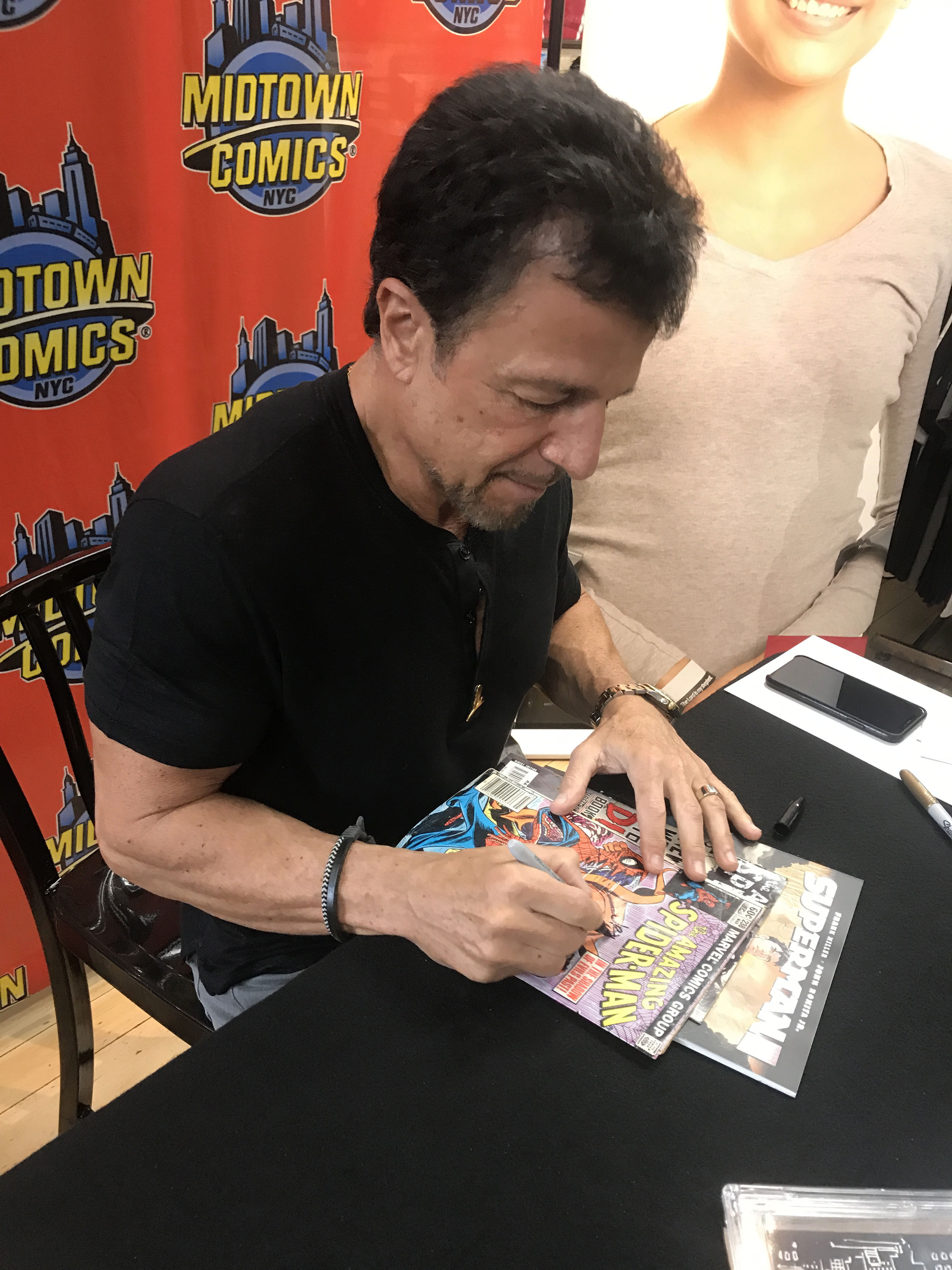
Artist John Romita Jr. signing a copy of The Amazing Spider-Man #238, in which the Hobgoblin first appeared, at Midtown Comics in Manhattan

The mystery was further complicated after James Owsley came on as editor of the Spider-Man titles. Owsley's relationship with DeFalco and artist Ron Frenz was strained from the beginning. When Owsley asked who the Hobgoblin was at a creators conference, DeFalco lied and said it was Ned Leeds. Owsley then wrote the one-shot Spider-Man vs Wolverine in which Leeds is killed off (though the actual death is not shown), and instructed The Spectacular Spider-Man writer Peter David to reveal the Hobgoblin's identity as the Foreigner. David objected and argued that the only person who fit the clues was Leeds. Having been present at the Spider-Man creator's conference, David also thought that Leeds was who DeFalco intended it to be. Because Spider-Man vs. Wolverine had already been drawn, however, it was too late to undo Leeds's death. Thus, the Hobgoblin's identity was revealed posthumously in the double-sized The Amazing Spider-Man #289. With Spider-Man's archenemy now dead, a new storyline was created from Jason Macendale's hatred of the Hobgoblin. Though the Hobgoblin's posthumous unmasking as Leeds was unpopular with fans, David said in a 2009 interview of still being proud of the story, arguing that the Hobgoblin being unmasked in a climactic battle with Spider-Man was the sort of tale readers had already seen countless times before, whereas having an archvillain unmasked in a flashback after having been brutally killed by nameless assassins was unprecedented and shocking.

Macendale supplanted the original Hobgoblin for a decade (1987-1997). Initially he wielded only the weaponry of his predecessor, but during the 1988–1989 "Inferno" crossover writer Gerry Conway had Macendale imbued with demonic powers by the demon N'astirh. In addition to power over hellfire and strength and speed far greater than his predecessor, N'astirh also disfigures Macendale so that his head resembles the Hobgoblin mask, and ultimately alters his mind so that he is deluded into thinking that his appearance is normal. Several years later, in issues of The Amazing Spider-Man, Macendale succeeds in purging himself of his demonic powers, leaving the demon that N'astirh imbued him with to become Demogoblin. Towards the end of Macendale's run as the Hobgoblin he was revamped again, this time with cybernetic implants.

Stern was unhappy with the revelation that the Hobgoblin's civilian identity was Leeds and wrote the three-issue miniseries Spider-Man: Hobgoblin Lives in 1997, with the retcon that Kingsley was the original Hobgoblin while Leeds was brainwashed into serving as a fall guy. In this miniseries Macendale is killed off. According to Stern, initially he had not known how to resolve the situation of having two Hobgoblins, and it was at the suggestion of the editorial staff that he had Kingsley kill Macendale and return to operating as the Hobgoblin. Leeds returns as an independent Hobgoblin in the 2019 miniseries Symbiote Spider-Man: Alien Reality, revealed to have trained as a sorcerer under Baron Mordo in the art of reality-altering chaos magic. Leeds and Kingsley are brainwashed to serve as the Hobgoblin enforcers of the Queen Goblin in the 2022 storyline "The Hobgoblins' Last Stand" by Zeb Wells.

== Fictional character biography ==
=== Roderick Kingsley ===
Roderick Kingsley unmasked as the original Hobgoblin in Spider-Man: Hobgoblin Lives #3 (March 1997). Art by Ron Frenz.

Roderick Kingsley became a socialite, fashion designer and billionaire with criminal underworld connections by using unethical business practices and corporate raiding. Kingsley was an employer of Mary Jane Watson for a time. As a means of avoiding the drill of day-to-day appearances, he has his timid identical twin brother Daniel Kingsley pose as him to run his corporation. Kingsley's activities give him many enemies, one of which is Bella Donna (Narda Ravanna), a rival fashion designer whose business he ruined. She attempts revenge on Kingsley but is twice thwarted by Spider-Man.

After these incidents, Kingsley seeks to protect himself and his empire by gaining more power. The thug George Hill reports to Kingsley of stumbling upon Norman Osborn's secret lair in hopes of earning a reward. Kingsley instead kills Hill to make sure that no one else gets wind of the discovery. Upon examining the lair and gleaning its secrets, Kingsley decides to use the Goblin equipment. Arriving to the conclusion that all the previous Green Goblin mantle wearers went mad, he creates a similar but different mantle: the Hobgoblin identity. He uses some of Osborn's files to blackmail prominent figures, and attempts to buy Osborn's old corporation Oscorp and merge it with his own. These schemes bring him into conflict with Spider-Man, to whom he repeatedly loses, as he lacks raw physical power. Among Osborn's notes, Kingsley finds remnants of Mendel Stromm's strength enhancing potion and eventually perfects it, but, aware that Osborn was driven insane, Kingsley opts to test on someone else first. He tricks small-time hood Lefty Donovan by using a mind-control equipment developed by Gerhard Winkler (Osborn's former employee), the "Winkler Device", able to turn anyone into a Hobgoblin enthralled to another. Kingsley monitors his pawn's vital signs and behavior from a distance. When Spider-Man overwhelms and unmasks Donovan and the brainwashing begins to fail, Kingsley acts to protect his identity by programming Donovan's glider to crash into a building, killing Donovan. Judging the experiment a success, Kingsley immerses himself in his completed formula derivative and gains greater strength than the original Goblin. Despite his increased abilities, he is still narrowly defeated by Spider-Man. Worse, he attracts the attention of powerful criminal interests who perceive him as a threat, including the Kingpin. After a bitter encounter with Spider-Man, Kingsley discovers Daily Bugle reporter Ned Leeds investigating his lair. Kingsley captures and brainwashes Leeds into being the Hobgoblin.

The Hobgoblin kidnaps Harry Osborn. He battles Osborn who uses his own father's weaponry against the Hobgoblin. During the events of Secret Wars II, the Hobgoblin is recruited by Mephisto to join the Legion Accursed, a team of supervillains who try to destroy the Beyonder. Leeds works with Richard Fisk on a plan to bring down the Kingpin's empire as Richard adopts the Rose crime lord identity, using Leeds to handle some negotiations. As Leeds gets too erratic to function as a decoy, Kingsley arranges for Leeds to be assassinated by Jason Macendale and the Foreigner while on a trip to Berlin, and retires from the Hobgoblin identity.

After several years, Kingsley returns to New York. He kills Macendale to prevent him from giving the authorities information that would jeopardize his secret identity in addition to seeing Macendale as an unworthy successor. Learning that Betty Brant has begun to investigate Leeds's activities as the Hobgoblin—informed of the truth by Spider-Man after deciding that the Foreigner's human operatives could never have killed Leeds if Leeds had been super-powered—Kingsley kidnaps Betty and sets a trap for Spider-Man. In the final fracas, Daniel is captured and the Hobgoblin is unmasked, clearing Ned's name. Roderick is taken to prison, imprisoned in the same cell where he killed Macendale.

Furious at Norman Osborn's return and denial of being the Green Goblin, Kingsley spreads rumors of a secret journal that proves that Osborn was the Goblin, actually a ruse, knowing Osborn has been sending spies on him: all of the journals in his possession were destroyed during a battle with Spider-Man years before. He offers to barter this information, for his freedom, with the district attorney, guessing that Osborn will try to get to him first. Osborn, deciding to make a deal with Kingsley, breaks him out of prison. Kingsley is confronted by both Osborn and another Green Goblin. Osborn provides Kingsley with new Goblin equipment, and both Goblins swoop in to collect Daniel, now in protective custody, who Roderick claims knows the final journal's location. Spider-Man defends Daniel, but is drugged and both men are taken back to Osborn. Osborn knew Kingsley was lying about the journal and has bought Kingsley's company out from underneath him; the purpose of helping Kingsley escape is for Osborn to personally eliminate the one person who can prove that he is the Goblin. Kingsley attacks Osborn, who is shocked that Kingsley fails at killing him despite being stronger. The building burns as a result of their battle, and Spider-Man escapes with Daniel. With several million dollars hidden in foreign bank accounts, Kingsley moves to a small island in the Caribbean to retire.

Kingsley is seemingly killed by Phil Urich, who takes on the Hobgoblin mantle, but this was in fact Daniel with Roderick still active in Ecuador under the alias of Devil-Spider. Roderick learns of his brother's murder and returns to New York City and the Hobgoblin role, intending to go after Urich. Kingsley attacks Urich and the Kingpin in Shadowland. After a brief battle between the Hobgoblins, Peter and Max Modell escape with the Goblin Key (a key to one of the Goblin warehouses). Kingsley and Urich call a brief truce and go after them. After accessing the warehouse, Peter uses the Goblin tech to make himself a "Spider-Glider" and escapes. Urich insists on going after but Kingsley stuns Urich with a taser so they can both escape. Kingsley decides to let Urich remain the Hobgoblin, but only if Urich gives him a cut of whatever profits are made.

Hobgoblin ends up in a gang war with the Goblin Nation, selling equipment to low-level criminals. He is killed by the first Goblin King while his henchmen are claimed for the Goblin Nation. It is later revealed that Kingsley's butler Claude died in his place and that Kingsley is actually in Paris.

During the "AXIS" storyline, Kingsley appears as a member of Magneto's unnamed supervillain group during the fight against the Red Skull. When Magneto arrives to recruit him, Kingsley attacks and is subjugated and forced to join Magneto's team. The inversion spell caused by Doctor Doom and Scarlet Witch affects the Red Skull and all those present in Genosha, making the superheroes present evil and the supervillains present good. Following his inversion, Kingsley returns to New York and finds himself happier with his inversion, although still motivated by greed rather than altruism. He reactivates his franchises where he leases the personas and costumes of deceased or retired superheroes to ordinary people, but remains a wanted criminal. He also enfranchises his Hobgoblin persona to various people to perform heroic deeds as Hobgoblin and publishes a comic about the group for promotion. After the reinversion spell is cast to restore the Avengers and X-Men members that were affected by it back to the side of good, Kingsley is evil again.

=== Lefty Donovan ===
Arnold Samuel "Lefty" Donovan was a petty thug until he was exposed to the Goblin formula, disfiguring his face and granting him superhuman abilities. Donovan is taken to a hospital. Brainwashed by the Winkler Device, Donovan eventually escapes the hospital and follows preprogrammed instructions to go to a hidden cache of Goblin weapons and dress up as the Hobgoblin. Donovan attacks New York City but Spider-Man confronts and unmasks him. Spider-Man recognizes Donovan. As Donovan shakes off some of his programming and starts talking, Kingsley programs the Goblin glider to crash into the side of a building, killing Donovan on impact.

=== Ned Leeds ===
Edward "Ned" Leeds, a reporter for the Daily Bugle, was initially revealed as the Hobgoblin's secret identity in 1987 at around the same time Leeds was murdered by the Foreigner. In 1997, Leeds was retroactively established to have been brainwashed by Roderick Kingsley to act as a stand-in on many occasions and fool the underworld into thinking that he was the Hobgoblin, and Kingsley takes back over the role. A clone of the character is introduced in Dead No More: The Clone Conspiracy. Leeds is revived in a 2021 story showing that, under the influence of the brainwashing, he ingested a copy of the Goblin formula which revived him shortly after his initial assassination, and went into hiding. In a 2022 story, Leeds and Kingsley are brainwashed by the Queen Goblin into both resuming their roles as Hobgoblins once more. In Symbiote Spider-Man: Alien Reality, Leeds is revealed to have trained as a sorcerer under Baron Mordo in the art of reality-altering chaos magic.

=== Jason Macendale ===
Jason Philip Macendale Jr. is a mercenary and former CIA agent who once operated as the supervillain Jack O'Lantern. Mistakenly believing that Ned Leeds is the original Hobgoblin, Macendale hires the Foreigner to kill Leeds so that he can replace him as the second Hobgoblin. Macendale is later killed by Roderick Kingsley.

=== Fifth version ===
An unidentified fifth Hobgoblin was introduced in the series Secret War. He received his equipment from the Tinkerer. Hobgoblin is sent along with Lady Octopus to attack Captain America in his civilian identity by a terrorist. This Hobgoblin is jailed along with the various defeated villains after the conclusion of the Secret War.

=== Daniel Kingsley ===
Daniel Kingsley is Roderick Kingsley's twin brother. He acts as a body double until he is exposed by Betty Brant while the true Hobgoblin is unmasked by Spider-Man. In protective custody, Daniel is unknowingly used by Roderick to blackmail Norman Osborn, resulting in the Hobgoblin swooping in to collect Daniel. Spider-Man defends Daniel but is drugged while Daniel passes out and both are taken to Osborn. As Kingsley and Osborn fight each other, Daniel is rescued by Spider-Man.

Kingsley later returns to New York, posing as his twin brother as the Hobgoblin. Kingsley investigates an old lair at OsCorp which has a flaming energy sword, but discovers Phil Urich trying to retrieve the same gear. Kingsley is stunned by Urich's "Lunatic Laugh" long enough for Urich to kill him.

=== Phil Urich ===
Phillip Benjamin "Phil" Urich (who once used the Green Goblin identity to operate as a superhero) took on the Hobgoblin identity as a supervillain with new body armor, a winged jetpack, and a flaming energy sword.

=== Norman Osborn ===
Norman Osborn briefly impersonated the original Hobgoblin.

=== Claude ===
Claude was Roderick's butler who was sent in place and to talk like his master to distract the Goblin Nation. He fought against and was killed in battle by the Goblin Knight. Afterwards, Goblin Knight discovered it was Claude who was killed and destroyed his body to keep the Goblin King from finding out about the imposter Hobgoblin.

== Powers, abilities, and equipment ==
Roderick Kingsley as the Hobgoblin as depicted on the artwork of 1986 Marvel Comics house advertisement promoting the Spider-Man storyline "The Saga of the Hobgoblin". Art by Ron Frenz.

As the Hobgoblin, Roderick Kingsley wears bulletproof mail with an overlapping tunic, cape, and cowl. A computerized system cybernetically causes the finger-blasters to randomly vary their attack vectors when trained on a particular target. He uses a Goblin glider, a one-man miniature turbo-fan-powered vertical thrust, cybernetically controlled vehicle. It can reach high velocities and is extremely maneuverable. He uses concussion and incendiary Jack O'Lanterns, wraith-shaped smoke and gas-emitting bombs, bat shaped razor-edged throwing blades, and gloves woven with micro-circuited power conducting filaments which channel pulsed discharges of electricity. He wore a shoulder bag to carry his small, portable weaponry.

Prior to his assassination, Ned Leeds wore the Hobgoblin's uniform and used the Goblin glider and equipment which included Jack O'Lantern bombs, razor bats and electrical shock gloves. However, he had no healing factor or superhuman strength. Following his ingesting the Goblin Formula and subsequent resurrection, Leeds developed superhuman strength, speed, reflexes, and stamina as well as a low-level rapid healing factor, the latter of which allow him to survive otherwise fatal gunshot wounds. Wielding chaos magic following his training as a sorcerer under Baron Mordo, Leeds is capable of sensing other magic users, as well as casting spells relating to flight, teleportation, time manipulation, elemental manipulation, and reality warping.

As the Hobgoblin, Phil Urich wears an orange Hobgoblin costume with wings on the back that allow him to fly without the use of a Goblin glider and he took the Hobgoblin mask as his own. He uses the traditional Pumpkin Bombs all Green Goblins and Hobgoblins before him have used, but he also has a new flaming sword. He still retains his "Lunatic Laugh" and he also has superhuman strength, speed, durability, stamina, reflexes and senses, and enhanced intellect. For unknown reasons, he no longer needs his Goblin mask to activate this power. With the help of Reverbium, his "Lunatic Laugh" was able to cause a building to collapse.

== Other versions ==
Various alternate universe versions of Hobgoblin have appeared throughout the character's publication history.

=== Amazing Spider-Man: Renew Your Vows ===
An alternate version of Roderick Kingsley / Hobgoblin appear in The Amazing Spider-Man: Renew Your Vows.

=== Earth-001 ===
An unidentified Earth-001 equivalent of Hobgoblin appears as a member of Verna's Hounds.

=== Hobgoblin 2211 ===
Hobgoblin 2211
- Hobgoblin 2211 (left) and Spider-Man 2211.

Publication information
- Publisher: Marvel Comics
- First appearance: Spider-Man 2099 Meets Spider-Man (November 1995)
- Created by: Peter David; Rick Leonardi

In-story information
- Alter ego: Robin Borne
- Species: Human mutate
- Abilities: Superhuman strength, speed, agility, stamina, durability and reflexes Genius-level intellect Use of goblin-themed weapons and paraphernalia

Hobgoblin 2211 first appears in Spider-Man 2099 Meets Spider-Man. While her costume sports the twentieth-century Green Goblins' green and purple color scheme, she boasted that she was the Hobgoblin of 2211. Her identity was not revealed to readers (or to the visiting Spider-Men of previous eras) at the time, but her later reappearance in Friendly Neighborhood Spider-Man (also written by Peter David) revealed her true identity and origin.

Hobgoblin 2211 is Robin "Hobby"/"Hob" Borne, Spider-Man's daughter. Her father always seemed to put his superhero career before raising his own daughter. She wanted to save the universes from 'intersecting'; in other words, having other parallel universes merge with the existing one, causing it to override. She was later arrested by her father for something that she would have done in future: unauthorized travel across time and space. She was held in a virtual reality prison where she lives a benign and trouble-free existence in what appears to be Kansas. Her boyfriend attempts to free her by uploading a virus into the prison, but inadvertently causes her to be driven insane. She attacked her father with a 'retcon bomb' (a variation on the original Goblins' pumpkin bombs) but it hit her boyfriend instead, erasing (or 'retconning') him from existence.

Now suited up as the Hobgoblin, Robin managed to time-travel to the current year, attacking the current Spider-Man in his reality and derailing an Uncle Ben from another reality into the present one causing a time paradox. Later, in a confrontation with her father, she threw a 'retcon bomb' at him. Spider-Man, believing it to be no more harmful than a regular pumpkin bomb, caught it with his web and threw it back to Robin, unwittingly erasing her from existence.

=== MC2 ===
An alternate version of Roderick Kingsley / Hobgoblin appears in the MC2 imprint.

=== Old Man Logan ===
An alternate version of Roderick Kingsley / Hobgoblin appears in the pages of Old Man Logan.

=== Ultimate Marvel ===
The Ultimate Marvel equivalent of the Hobgoblin is Harry Osborn under the influence of an alternate personality.

== Reception ==
In 2009, IGN ranked the Roderick Kingsley incarnation of the Hobgoblin 57th in their "Top 100 Comic Book Villains" list.

== In other media ==
=== Television ===
The Hobgoblin as depicted in Spider-Man: The Animated Series

- An original incarnation of the Hobgoblin appears in Spider-Man: The Animated Series, (Note: Roderick Kingsley had yet to be established as the original Hobgoblin in the comics when Spider-Man: The Animated Series was produced, so the show's version of the character was instead an amalgamation of the original Hobgoblin's personality and ambitions; Jason Macendale's name and, initially, his mercenary occupation; and Lefty Donovan's background as a former petty crook.) voiced by Mark Hamill. This version is Felicia Hardy's fiancé Jason Philips. Additionally, an alternate reality version of the Hobgoblin appears as Spider-Carnage's enforcer in the two-part series finale.
- Roderick Kingsley appears in The Spectacular Spider-Man episode "Accomplices", voiced by Courtney B. Vance. This version is an African-American crime lord and the owner of a perfume company.
- The Harry Osborn incarnation of the Hobgoblin appears in Spider-Man, voiced by Max Mittelman. This version possesses Phil Urich's flaming energy sword and sonic scream.
- The Roderick Kingsley incarnation of the Hobgoblin appears in Marvel Super Hero Adventures, voiced by Andrew Francis.

=== Video games ===
- The Ned Leeds incarnation of the Hobgoblin appears in Spider-Man and Captain America in Doctor Doom's Revenge.
- The Jason Macendale incarnation of the Hobgoblin appears as a boss in The Amazing Spider-Man.
- The Jason Macendale incarnation of the Hobgoblin appears in Spider-Man vs. The Kingpin.
- The Jason Macendale incarnation of the Hobgoblin appears in Spider-Man: The Video Game, voiced by David Hadinger.
- The Jason Macendale incarnation of the Hobgoblin appears as a boss in The Amazing Spider-Man 2.
- The Jason Macendale incarnation of the Hobgoblin appears as a boss in Spider-Man: Return of the Sinister Six.
- The Roderick Kingsley incarnation of the Hobgoblin appears as an assist character in the PSP and PS2 versions of Spider-Man: Web of Shadows.
- The Roderick Kingsley incarnation of the Hobgoblin appears in Marvel: Ultimate Alliance 2 as an alternate costume for the Green Goblin.
- An original Marvel 2099 incarnation of the Hobgoblin appears in Spider-Man: Shattered Dimensions, voiced by Steve Blum. This version is a mercenary hired by Alchemax and possesses nanofiber/bio-organic circuitry wings and "psy-powers".
- The Roderick Kingsley incarnation of the Hobgoblin appears in Lego Marvel Super Heroes 2.
- The Earth-21205 version of Peter Parker / Hobgoblin appears as a playable character in Spider-Man Unlimited.
- The Phil Urich incarnation of the Hobgoblin appears as a playable character in Marvel Contest of Champions.
