= Daily Bugle =

Fictional New York City newspaper

Publication information
- Publisher: Marvel Comics
- First appearance: Marvel Mystery Comics #18 (April 1941) (historical); Fantastic Four #2 (January 1962) (modern)
- Created by: Historical Carl Burgos; Modern Stan Lee Jack Kirby

In-story information
- Type of business: Newspaper
- Owner(s): J. Jonah Jameson (former); Thomas Fireheart (former); William Walter Goodman (former); Norman Osborn (former); Dexter Bennett (former); Robbie Robertson (current)
- Employee(s): Kat Farrell; Betty Brant; Glory Grant; Formerly: Joe "Robbie" Robertson; Irene Merryweather; Frederick Foswell; Andrew "Andy" Anderson; Ben Urich; Ned Leeds; Peter Parker; Eddie Brock

The Daily Bugle (at one time The DB!) is a fictional New York City tabloid newspaper appearing as a plot element in American comic books published by Marvel Comics. The Daily Bugle is a regular fixture in the Marvel Universe, most prominently in Spider-Man comic titles and their derivative media. The newspaper first appeared in the Human Torch story in Marvel Mystery Comics #18 (April 1941). It returned in Fantastic Four #2 (January 1962), and its offices were first depicted in The Amazing Spider-Man #1 (March 1963).

The Daily Bugle was first featured on film in the 2002 film Spider-Man. The fictional newspaper is meant to be a pastiche of both the New York Daily News and the New York Post, two popular real-life New York City tabloids. The outlet appears in Sam Raimi's Spider-Man trilogy (2002–07), Marc Webb's The Amazing Spider-Man duology (2012–14) and Sony's Spider-Man Universe (2018–24). The agency is reimagined as a sensationalist news website in the Marvel Cinematic Universe (MCU) films Spider-Man: Far From Home (2019) and Spider-Man: No Way Home (2021), the SSU film Venom: Let There Be Carnage (2021), and the web series The Daily Bugle (2019–22), headlined by J. K. Simmons and Angourie Rice as J. Jonah Jameson and Betty Brant. An alternate version of the web series hosted by Nicque Marina was featured in promotional material for the SSU film Morbius (2022).

== Publishing history ==
The Daily Bugle is featured prominently in many Marvel Comics titles, especially those in which Spider-Man is the lead character. In 1996, a three-issue (black and white) limited series was printed.

Since 2006, Marvel has published a monthly Daily Bugle newspaper reporting on the company's publications and authors. Marvel earlier used the newspaper format to promote Marvel's crossover events Civil War and House of M—reporting on storyline events as if the comic book Daily Bugle had come to life. Marvel restored this promotional function for the 2007 death of Captain America.

== Fictional history ==
The Daily Bugle was founded in 1898 and has been published daily ever since. The Daily Bugle is printed in tabloid format like its rival the Daily Globe. The editor and publisher of the Bugle, J. Jonah Jameson, began his journalistic career as a reporter for the Bugle while still in high school. Jameson purchased the then-floundering Bugle with inheritance funds, from his recently deceased father-in-law and turned the paper into a popular success. Other magazines published from time-to-time include the revived Now magazine and the now-defunct Woman magazine, edited by Carol Danvers.

J. Jonah Jameson, Inc. purchased the Goodman Building on 39th Street and Second Avenue in 1936 and moved its entire editorial and publishing facilities there. Now called the Daily Bugle Building, the office complex is forty-six stories tall, and is capped by the Daily Bugle logo in 30-foot (9.1 m) letters on the roof. There are loading docks in the rear of the building, reached by a back alley. Three floors are devoted to the editorial office of the Bugle and two sub-basement levels to the printing presses, while the rest of the floors are rented.

The newspaper is noted for its anti-superhero slant, especially concerning Spider-Man, whom the paper constantly smears as a part of its editorial policy. However, the editor-in-chief, Robbie Robertson, the only subordinate to Jameson who is not intimidated by him, has worked to moderate it. More positively, the newspaper has also published important exposés of political corruption and organized crime in the city, and also takes a strong stance in favor of mutant rights, which has led to its being targeted by various criminals and hate groups.

Due to declining circulation, Jameson has conceded to Robertson's objections and has created a special feature section of the paper called The Pulse, which focuses on superheroes. In addition, the paper also intermittently ran a glossy magazine called Now Magazine.

Soon after the team's formation, the New Avengers decided to strike a deal with Jameson regarding exclusive content in exchange for removing the strong anti-Spider-Man sentiment from the newspaper, to which Jameson agreed. Merely one day later, Jameson broke the spirit (though not the letter) of his agreement with Iron Man, using the headline "a wanted murderer (Wolverine), an alleged ex-member of a terrorist organization (Spider-Woman) and a convicted heroin-dealer (Luke Cage) are just some of the new recruits set to bury the once good name of the Avengers," but refraining from attacking Spider-Man. This prompted Jessica Jones to sell the first pictures of her newborn baby to one of the Bugle's competitors instead.

In the first issue of Runaways (vol. 2), Victor Mancha states in an exchange about Spider-Man that "The only people who think he's a criminal are Fox News and the Daily Bugle. And the Bugle is, like, the least respected newspaper in New York City." The paper's major named competitors are the Daily Globe, which implicitly takes a more balanced look at superheroes, Front Line, run by EIC Ben Urich and Sally Floyd, and The Alternative. After Peter Parker revealed that he is Spider-Man and the Bugle planned to sue him for fraud, the paper itself was put on the defensive with front page accusations from the Globe (with information secretly supplied by Bugle reporter Betty Brant) of libeling the superhero.

The adventures of the staff of the newspaper beyond Peter Parker have been depicted in two series, Daily Bugle and The Pulse.

=== The DB ===
After Jameson suffered a near-fatal heart attack, his wife sold the Bugle to rival newspaper man Dexter Bennett, who changed the name to The DB! (either standing for Dexter Bennett or Daily Bugle), and transformed it into a scandal sheet. Since after Brand New Day no one knows the secret identity of Spider-Man anymore, the animosity between Jameson and Parker is retconned as a simple financial question, with Jameson's heart attack coming right after a monetary request from Peter.

The reputation of the DB! since the mention in Runaways (vol. 2) has plummeted downward because of the new, scandalistic angle Bennett gives it. Several reporters unwilling, or refusing the new course, like Peter himself, are forced to go away, finding a new safe haven in the Front Line, the only magazine willing to accept people that were fired by Bennett, pursuing a scorched earth policy over them.

The villain Electro targeted Dexter Bennett because of a government bailout plan for the financially strapped paper. Spider-Man intervened, and during a battle inside the DB! offices, the entire building was demolished, bringing an end to the newspaper as well.

=== Front Line ===
Front Line was a newspaper founded and run by Ben Urich and Sally Floyd. The organization was formed in Civil War: Front Line #11 as Frontlines.com. The newspaper appeared in the miniseries World War Hulk: Front Line and Siege: Embedded. Originally it was not competitive with the Daily Bugle while Jameson was still in charge, but it became an alternative view to The DB! once Bennett took control.

=== Reborn ===
Sometime after the DB!'s destruction, Jameson, now the mayor of New York, cashed in the DB! shares that he acquired from Bennett and gave the money to Robbie Robertson. Jameson asked Robertson to remake Front Line (which itself was on hard times) into the new Daily Bugle.

== Fictional staff members ==
=== Current ===
- Betty Brant (reporter), Secretary (formerly)
- Abner Abernathy
- Tom Amos (reporter) – Named but yet to be seen
- Alejandro Arbona (copy editor) – based on an actual person
- Johanna Audiffred (Jeff Suter's assistant)
- Connor Austen (reporter) – attended SHIELD press conference
- Chris Baiocchi (staff writer) – interviewed Tony Stark
- John Barber (copy editor)
- Ron Barney (reporter) – Named but yet to be seen.
- Joe Bazooka (reporter) – Named but yet to be seen.
- Noel Beckford (reporter)
- Aaron "Abe" Benerstein (film critic)
- Mike Berino Bering (reporter) – Named but yet to be seen.
- Miriam Birchwood (gossip columnist) – Attended Reed and Sue Richards' wedding.
- Phil Bostwich (reporter) – Named but yet to be seen.
- Tom Brevoort (executive editor) – based on actual person
- Kenny Brown
- Blaine Browne (reporter)
- Isabel "Izzy" Bunsen (science editor)
- Ed Brubaker (reporter) – based on actual person, co-wrote report of Captain America's assassination with Kat Farrell.
- Dan Buckley (J. Jonah Jameson's assistant)
- Marge Butler (Receptionist)
- Harrison Cahill (chairman of the board)
- Ken Clarke (reporter)
- George Clum (theater critic)
- Ksitigarbha "Miss Kay" Cohn (reporter)
- Peggy Collins (Intern)
- Cole Cooper (photographer)
- Kathryn "Kate" Cushing (city editor)
- Vickie Danner (Washington DC liaison)
- Peter David (reporter) – based on actual person
- Dan Davis (reporter)
- Albert Jack Dickinson (reporter)
- Nick Dillman (reporter)
- Herman Donaldson (fact checker)
- Kim Drunter (financial reporter)
- Rich DuFour (reporter)
- Sam Dunne (national editor)
- Anthea Dupres (reporter)
- Edwin E. Edwards (photographer)
- Ken Ellis (reporter) – dubbed the Scarlet Spider... the Scarlet Spider.
- Christine Everhart
- Steve Epting (photographer) – Based on the comic book artist
- Mark Ewing (reporter) – Investigated the alleged conspiracy involving the group Control
- Samuel Exmore (apprentice editor)
- Tony Falcone (copy writer)
- Debby Ferraro
- Nicholas Finch (reporter)
- Bob Fisck (political correspondent) – interviewed Valerie Cooper
- Sid Franken (reporter)
- Colm Glover (reporter) – Named but yet to be seen
- Tim Gluohy (reporter) – Named but yet to be seen.
- Melvin Gooner (reporter)
- Glory Grant (Administrative Assistant)
- Justin Gray (reporter) – based on actual person
- Marc Guggenheim (reporter) – based on actual person
- Banning Gumpart
- Toni Harris (apprentice editor)
- Matt Hicksville (reporter) – Named but yet to be seen
- David Hine (reporter)
- Jean-Paul Hoffman
- Russ Holmes
- Edward Holt (purchasing officer)
- Matt Idelson (reporter) – Named but yet to be seen
- Max Igoe (sports writer)
- Frank Janson (rewrite editor)
- Hal Jerkins (typesetter)
- Bud Johnson (page designer)
- Charles Jones (member of the board of directors)
- Richard Jones (Phantom Reporter) – offered a job as a reporter
- David L. Kanon (photographer)
- Richard "Dick" Katrobousis (editor)
- Steve Keene (accountant)
- Samuel Kingston (syndicated columns editor) – offered Phantom Reporter a job because of his "unique" perspective.
- Lee "Your Man at the Bugle" Kirby (Entertainment Writer), based on actual persons
- Richard "Andy" Lessman (reporter)
- Yusef Lichtenstein (editor)
- Maggie Lorca (reporter)
- Nick Lowe (entertainment editor)
- Judy Lumley (society & fashion editor)
- Karen Lynch
- Eileen Lutomski (proofreader)
- Ann MacIntosh (columnist and classified editor)
- Jerome Maida (reporter)
- Midge Marder (editor)
- Ralfie Markarian (reporter)
- Michael Marts (reporter) – Named but yet to be seen
- Tom Marvelli (Art Director)
- Mike Mayhew (photographer)
- Maggie McCulloch (chief librarian)
- Jim Mclaughlin (reporter)
- Patrick McGrath (Graphic Designer) – Based on a real person
- Joy Mercado (reporter) – A tough, intelligent, sassy investigative reporter, a friend of Peter Parker who may suspect he is really Spider-Man.
- Clifford Meth (reporter) – interviewed Tony Stark and Wasp
- Dawn Michaels (investigative reporter)
- Harvey Michaelson (reporter)
- Kirk Morello (reporter) – interviewed Misty Knight & Colleen Wing
- Daniel Morton (photographer)
- Terry Morrow (staff writer)
- Danny Nasimoff (night editor)
- Jim Nausedas (Jeff Suter's assistant)
- Ben O'Malley (freelance writer) – wrote article on Super-Hero imitation
- Sean O'Reilly (reporter)
- Marge O'Toole
- Bill Oakley (reporter)
- Jan Parsec (reporter) – Named but yet to be seen
- Trevor Parsons (reporter)
- Victor Paunchilito (Reporter/Columnist)
- Victor Pei (assistant photography editor)
- Suzie Pelkey (receptionist)
- Ryan Penagos (reporter) – based on actual person, interviewed Tony Stark and David Purdin.
- Robert Pitney (typesetter)
- Bill Price (reporter)
- Gus Qualen (photographer)
- Joe Quesada (Joe Robertson's assistant) – based on actual person
- David Rabinowitz (reporter)
- Ralph Reddin (security guard)
- Brian Reed (reporter) – based on actual person
- Carl Reed-Duxfield (reporter)
- Tony Reeves (photographer)
- Patrick Reynolds (reporter)
- Jim Richardson
- Kim Robinson
- Bill Rosemann (editor) – based on actual person
- Fabio Rossi (Advertising Salesman)
- Mike Sangiocomo (correspondent)
- Andy Schmidt (political editor) – based on an actual person
- Cory Sedlmeier (photo editor) – based on actual person
- Arnold Sibert (entertainment editor and movie critic) – became involved in opposing a plot of Mysterio
- Joe Sidesaddle (reporter) – Named but yet to be seen
- Warren Simons (sports editor) – based on actual person
- Sanjay Sinclair (reporter)
- Dan Slott (reporter) – based on actual person
- Charles "Charley" Snow (reporter)
- John Snow (White House Spokesperson)
- Jeff Stern (reporter)
- J. Michael Straczinski (reporter) – based on actual person, worked for the Marvel Comics universe version of Marvel Comics.
- Jeff Suter (Senior Art Director) – based on actual person
- Bill Tatters (reporter) – Named but yet to be seen
- Leila Taylor (reporter)
- Duke Thomas (reporter)
- Wendy Thorton (sports columnist)
- Maury Toeitch (reporter) – Named but yet to be seen
- Reginald Lance Toomey
- Dilbert Trilby (obituary writer)
- Charlie Verreos (reporter)
- Bill Webb (photographer)
- David Weiss (copy editor)
- Sydney Weiss (reporter)
- Zeb Wells (reporter) – based on actual person
- Jill Whyte-Blythe (reporter)
- Sarah Williams (photographer)
- Spence Williams (Intern)
- Richard Wormly (editor-in-chief's assistant)
- Bill Xanthis (rewrite editor)
- Angela Yin (photographer) – Sister of the criminal Dragonfly
- Callum Broom (photographer)
- Mickey Zimmer (photographer)
- Lester (reporter)

=== Former ===
- Dexter Bennett (former owner)
- J. Jonah Jameson (publisher)
- Joseph "Robbie" Robertson (Editor-in-Chief) – Presently the Editor-in Chief for Frontline.
- Nick Bandouveris (reporter) – Killed by Bastion; his murder is the reason JJJ didn't take the Xavier files from Bastion
- Lance Bannon (photographer) – killed by F.A.C.A.D.E.
- Eleanore Arlene Brant (Jameson's former secretary) – Betty's mother; put into a coma
- Meredith Campbell (intern)
- Jack "Flash Gun" Casey (Reporter circa 1940s)
- Jacob Conover (reporter) – In jail after being revealed to be the criminal Rose
- Ethan Edwards (Virtue/Tiller/Moral-Man) (reporter)
- Katherine "Kat" Farrell (reporter)
- Ian Fate (reporter)
- Thomas Fireheart (Owner)
- Frederick Foswell (reporter) – Got fired from the Bugle then rehired again; he later dies saving Spider-Man
- Phil Fox (reporter) – deceased
- Cliff Garner (reporter) – formerly of the Air Force, investigated the possible conspiracy of Control. Garner was killed by co-conspiracy theorist General Edward Harrison
- Simon J. Goodman (publisher) – publisher in the 1940s, name is probably a reference to Martin Goodman, first publisher of Marvel Comics.
- William Walter Goodman (Owner/Publisher)
- Irving Griffin
- Derek Gratham (intern)
- Unknown female reporter (reporter) – Mystique in disguise, seen working as a Daily Bugle reporter in X-Factor
- Amber Grant (freelance photographer) – made Peter Parker envious of her ability to tell off Jameson and still sell to him; current status unknown
- Jeffrey Haight (photographer) – former boyfriend of Anna Kefkin, made alliance with Doctor Octopus in desperate effort to gain a front-page photograph. Sent to prison for assisting in Dr. Octopus' escape.
- Walter "Old Man" Jameson (Editor/Reporter) – Mistakenly assumed to be JJJ's father, David Jameson.
- Jessica Jones (Superhero correspondent and consultant) – Resigned after Jameson trashed then-boyfriend, Luke Cage in an article about the New Avengers
- Nick Katzenberg (reporter) – died of lung cancer
- Terri Kidder (reporter) – killed by the Green Goblin
- Simon LaGrange (reporter) – fired
- Ned Leeds (Hobgoblin) (reporter) – killed by the Foreigner's men
- Sean Lowe (editor)
- Laurie Lynton (columnist)
- Jeff Mace (Patriot/Captain America) (Reporter circa 1940)
- James Jonah "JJ" McTeer (reporter) – deceased
- Irene Merryweather (reporter) – freelance and then became salaried, Fired
- Mary Morgan (Miss Patriot) (Reporter circa 1940s)
- Glorianna O'Breen (photographer) – deceased
- Norman Osborn (Green Goblin) (Owner) – Bought then lost control of the Bugle
- Peter Parker (photographer, usually freelance): Fired for refusing to accept Dexter Bennett's way of doing business. Presently works as a freelance photographer for the "Frontline".
- Jess Patton (Secretary) – Killed and body taken over by the Thousand
- Addie Pinckney (Los Angeles Correspondent) – status unknown, was elderly when depicted.
- Armando Ruiz (Janitor) – deceased
- Christine Ryan (reporter) – resigned
- Chuck Self (reporter) – Handcuffed himself to the Punisher to get a story; died from falling into a woodchipper
- Phil Sheldon (photographer) – Retired after the death of Gwen Stacy
- Gabriel Simms (Security Guard) – deceased
- C. Thomas Sites (Reporter circa 1940s)
- Paul Swanson (reporter) – fired
- Ben Urich (reporter) – Resigns after the Civil War and creates Frontline.
- Phil Urich (cameraman for Norah Winters, current Hobgoblin); fired after secret identity was exposed. – Currently working in LA with the Loners
- Lynn Walsh (Intern)
- William "Billy" Walters (photographer) – Left the Bugle to care for his aging mother.
- Norah Winters (reporter); fired due to affiliation with Phil Urich after his secret identity was exposed.
- Ray Rothman (employee) – fired by J. Jonah Jameson for viewing article.

== Reception ==
=== Accolades ===
- In 2019, CBR.com ranked the Daily Bugle 2nd in their "Top 10 Fictional Marvel Companies" list.

=== Impact ===
- The Daily Bugle appears on a newspaper in the 1977 horror movie Death Bed: The Bed That Eats.

== Other versions ==
=== Age of Apocalypse ===
An alternate universe iteration of the Daily Bugle appears in Age of Apocalypse. This version is run by Robbie Robertson and is a clandestine paper meant to inform the public about the secrets of Apocalypse.

=== Amalgam Comics ===
The Gotham Bugle (an amalgamation of the Daily Bugle and DC Comics' the Gotham Gazette) appears in the Amalgam Comics imprint, with J. Jonah White, Jimmy Urich, Tana Moon, Jack Ryder and Pete Ross as prominent employees.

=== 1602 ===
An alternate universe iteration of the Daily Bugle appears in Marvel 1602. This version is the Daily Trumpet, the first "news-sheet" in the New World.

=== House of M ===
An alternate universe iteration of the Daily Bugle appears in House of M. This version largely serves as a propaganda machine for the ruling mutant hierarchy. Stories can be and are repressed if they are not favorable enough to mutants.

=== Ultimate Marvel ===
An alternate universe iteration of the Daily Bugle appears in the Ultimate Marvel imprint. After the events of "Ultimatum", the Daily Bugle, much like the rest of New York, was heavily damaged. Rather than being rebuilt, the Bugle was made into an online newspaper.

=== Ultimate Universe ===
An alternate universe iteration of the Daily Bugle appears in the Ultimate Universe imprint. This version is owned by Wilson Fisk. J. Jonah Jameson and Ben Parker are depicted as former employees of the Daily Bugle until they resigned upon being disgusted at nobody wanting to investigate Tony Stark's "attack on New York City", opting to instead start their own journalism company, The Paper.

== In other media ==
=== Television ===
- The Daily Bugle appears in Spider-Man (1967).
- The Daily Bugle appears in The Amazing Spider-Man (1978).
- A Daily Bugle newspaper appears in the Spider-Woman episode "The Kongo Spider".
- The Daily Bugle appears in Spider-Man: The Animated Series. This version of the Bugle has a sister program called J3 Communications, a broadcasting station hosted by J. Jonah Jameson.
- A Daily Bugle newspaper appears in the X-Men: Evolution episode "On Angel's Wings".
- The Daily Bugle appears in Spider-Man: The New Animated Series.
- A parody of the Daily Bugle appears in a skit called "The X-Play Bugle", with Adam Sessler as the editor-in-chief, in the X-Play episode "Spider-Man 3".
- The Daily Bugle appears in The Spectacular Spider-Man. Similar to the depictions seen in the Sam Raimi film trilogy and the Marvels, this version of the newspaper is also housed in the Flatiron Building.
- The Daily Bugle appears in The Avengers: Earth's Mightiest Heroes episode "Along Came a Spider...".
- The Daily Bugle appears in Ultimate Spider-Man. This version is called Daily Bugle Communications, which serves as a television news outlet, with J. Jonah Jameson (voiced by J. K. Simmons) as its CEO as well as its most prominent anchorman.
  - The Daily Bugle appears again in Avengers Assemble.
  - The Daily Bugle appears again in Hulk and the Agents of S.M.A.S.H..
- The Daily Bugle appears in Marvel's Spider-Man.
- A parody of the Daily Bugle called the Daily Guardian appears in the Guardians of the Galaxy episode "Black Vortex, Part 1".
- A Daily Bugle newspaper appears in the X-Men '97 episode "To Me, My X-Men".
- The Daily Bugle appears in Spider-Noir, with the editor, Howard Walters, portrayed by Richard Robichaux.

=== Film ===
- A Portland City Edition of The Daily Bugle appears in The Shawshank Redemption (1994), it is the newspaper Andy Dufresne mails the evidence of the Warden's criminal activity to, leading to his suicide
- The Daily Bugle appears in Spider-Man (2002), Spider-Man 2 (2004), and Spider-Man 3 (2007), all directed by Sam Raimi. This version is housed in the Flatiron Building like in the Marvels miniseries, with J. Jonah Jameson (portrayed by J. K. Simmons) as the editor-in-chief, Robbie Robertson (portrayed by Bill Nunn) as associate editor, and Betty Brant (portrayed by Elizabeth Banks), Peter Parker (portrayed by Tobey Maguire), and Eddie Brock (portrayed by Topher Grace) as employees. One Bugle employee who appears exclusively in the films is Hoffman (portrayed by Ted Raimi), who serves as comic relief and is frequently harassed by Jameson.
- The Daily Bugle appears in The Amazing Spider-Man (2012) and The Amazing Spider-Man 2 (2014), both directed by Marc Webb. This version of the company is a newspaper outlet and television station. Additionally, a Daily Bugle blog was hosted on Tumblr, where promotional material was posted as in-universe articles.
- The Daily Bugle appears in a flashback depicted in Spider-Man: Into the Spider-Verse (2018).
- The Daily Bugle appears in films set in Sony's Spider-Man Universe.

=== Marvel Cinematic Universe ===
A controversial online news outlet called TheDailyBugle.net appears in media set in the Marvel Cinematic Universe (MCU). First appearing in the mid-credits scene of the film Spider-Man: Far From Home (2019), the outlet makes further appearances in the film Spider-Man: No Way Home (2021) and the web series The Daily Bugle (2019–22).

=== Video games ===
- The Daily Bugle appears as a stage in Marvel Super Heroes.
- The Daily Bugle appears in X-Men: Mutant Academy 2.
- The Daily Bugle appears in Spider-Man (2000).
- The Daily Bugle appears in Spider-Man 2: Enter: Electro.
- The Daily Bugle appears in Spider-Man (2002) film tie-in game.
- The Daily Bugle appears in the Spider-Man 2 film tie-in game.
- The Daily Bugle appears as a stage in Marvel Nemesis: Rise of the Imperfects.
- The Daily Bugle appears in Ghost Rider's challenge mode.
- The Daily Bugle appears as a landmark in the Spider-Man 3 film tie-in game.
- The Daily Bugle appears in The Incredible Hulk.
- The Daily Bugle appears in Spider-Man: Web of Shadows.
- The Daily Bugle appears as a stage in Marvel vs. Capcom 3: Fate of Two Worlds and Ultimate Marvel vs. Capcom 3.
- Daily Bugle Communications appears in Disney Infinity: 2.0.
- A Marvel Noir-inspired version of the Daily Bugle appears in Lego Marvel Super Heroes 2.
- The Daily Bugle appears in Marvel's Spider-Man.
- The Daily Bugle appears in Fortnite.
- The Daily Bugle appears in Marvel Snap.

=== Miscellaneous ===
- An unrelated Daily Bugle appears in the untelevised DC Comics-related pilot The Adventures of Superpup.
- The Daily Bugle appears in the Broadway musical Spider-Man: Turn Off the Dark.
