= Foreigner (character) =

Marvel Comics fictional character

- The Foreigner battling Spider-Man on the cover of The Spectacular Spider-Man #209 (February 1994). Art by Sal Buscema.

Publication information
- Publisher: Marvel Comics
- First appearance: Peter Parker, the Spectacular Spider-Man #116 (July 1986)
- Created by: Peter David; Rich Buckler

In-story information
- Species: Human
- Team affiliations: 1400 Club
- Notable aliases: Kris Keating
- Abilities: Trained assassin and master of disguise Minor hypnotic abilities

The Foreigner is a supervillain appearing in American comic books published by Marvel Comics. He was formerly married to Silver Sable. The Foreigner is a mercenary and assassin. Although he has no superhuman abilities, he has trained his body to be in absolute peak physical condition, is among the greatest martial arts practitioners in the Marvel Universe, and as a professional assassin who has evaded detection by various international law enforcement agencies, is highly intelligent. He is often depicted as being exceedingly competent.

Christopher Abbott played the Foreigner in the Sony's Spider-Man Universe (SSU) film Kraven the Hunter.

== Publication history ==
Writer Peter David created the Foreigner as a master assassin character to be a nemesis for Spider-Man. According to David, the character was designed to bear a strong resemblance to actor Patrick McGoohan. The character's voice was first heard on a telephone in a scene in Web of Spider-Man #15 (June 1986), which was written by David Michelinie, but he did not make a full, visual appearance until the following month in Peter Parker, the Spectacular Spider-Man #116 (July 1986).

Editor Jim Owsley favored Foreigner as the Hobgoblin's true identity.

== Fictional character biography ==
The Foreigner first appears as a foe of Spider-Man when making a wager with another villain, Chance, that the latter could not defeat and kill Spider-Man. The Foreigner wins this wager. In an attempt to impress the Foreigner, the assassin Sabretooth volunteers to kill Black Cat, who has stolen a solid gold notebook from the Foreigner's office, but Spider-Man intervenes and defeats Sabretooth. Eventually, Foreigner defeats Black Cat himself and decides to start a relationship with her under the pretense of forming an alliance in order to destroy Spider-Man. In truth, Foreigner plans to enlist Spider-Man to join the 1400 Club, his club of assassins. Spider-Man turns him down.

The Foreigner is hired to kill Ned Leeds by Jason Macendale. It is later revealed that Leeds was a puppet of Hobgoblin (Roderick Kingsley), who had abandoned the persona to avoid such an assassination. Foreigner hires Whisper, Pulse, Swift, and Warfare to kill Betty Brant, Leeds' widow, who is seeking to expose the Foreigner's role in his death. Foreigner reveals to Betty that Leeds was supposedly the original Hobgoblin.

Peggy Carter, operating as Dryad, takes down Foreigner's New York-based safe houses. Carter confronts Foreigner and fights him until Crossbones and Sin shoot a missile at them. Carter survives the attack, while Foreigner is presumed dead.

Foreigner and Chance learn that Empire State University student Jamie Tolentino used the Clairvoyant to win all bets and racked up a debt when it ran out of battery power. Tolentino tells the two that he they can get him the Catalyst as a power source for the Clairvoyant. They succeed despite the intervention of Spider-Man. It is then revealed that Jack O'Lantern, Grizzly, and many of the Palace's patrons are actually sleeper agents of Finisher and Chameleon. Spider-Man and Tolentino prevent the Palace from crashing into Manhattan. With his bank accounts drained by Spider-Man and Ned Leeds, Foreigner hires Taskmaster and Black Ant to assist in his payback plot.

During the Sinister War storyline, Foreigner is among the villains sent by Kindred to attack Spider-Man.

== Powers and abilities ==
The Foreigner has no superhuman abilities. However, he has trained his body to be in peak physical condition. He is stronger, faster, more agile, and has better reaction time than any Olympic athlete. He is adept in all known forms of martial arts, and most forms of conventional hand weaponry. He is among the greatest pugilists in the Marvel Universe, similar in ability to Captain America and Wolverine. His skills are such that even without superhuman abilities, he is able to pull off seemingly inhuman feats of strength through intense concentration, and has even battled Spider-Man to a standstill.

He possesses a near-mystic ability to place an opponent in a 10-second hypnotic trance through eye contact. This leaves the target disoriented, making them believe that the Foreigner can move at superhuman speeds.

He is a master of disguises and has assumed various identities all over the world. He is a skilled strategist, tactician, and intelligence gatherer, which has helped him escaped much notice from governments and their agencies, leaving it to Spider-Man and other superheroes to handle him.

== In other media ==
The Foreigner appears in Kraven the Hunter, portrayed by Christopher Abbott. This version is an associate of Aleksei Sytsevich and an assassin who uses ocular hypnosis to disorient his targets. He attempts to poison Kraven the Hunter only to be shot and killed by Calypso.
