= J. Jonah Jameson =

Marvel Comics character

- J. Jonah Jameson in Marvel Knights: Spider-Man #4 (Sept. 2004); Art by Terry Dodson

Publication information
- Publisher: Marvel Comics
- First appearance: The Amazing Spider-Man #1 (March 1963)
- Created by: Stan Lee (writer); Steve Ditko (artist)

In-story information
- Full name: John Jonah Jameson Jr.
- Species: Human
- Place of origin: New York City
- Team affiliations: Daily Bugle; Now Magazine; Jameson Publications; Jameson News Digest; Women Magazine; Fact Channel; Just the Facts with J. Jonah Jameson
- Supporting character of: Spider-Man; Spider-Woman; Silk
- Notable aliases: J. Jonah Jameson (title), Jojo

John Jonah Jameson Jr. is a character appearing in American comic books published by Marvel Comics, most commonly in association with the superhero Spider-Man. The character was created by writer Stan Lee and artist Steve Ditko, and he first appeared in The Amazing Spider-Man issue #1 (March 1963).

Jameson is typically depicted as the publisher or editor-in-chief of the Daily Bugle, a fictional New York City newspaper. Recognizable by his moustache, flattop haircut, and ever-present cigar, he carries out a smear campaign against Spider-Man (and to a lesser extent, other superheroes such as Daredevil and the Avengers), frequently referring to him as a "threat" or "menace" and a criminal, but occasionally and reluctantly allying with him. This usually stems from his deep-seated belief in law enforcement and government agencies. Jameson thus despises superheroes for working outside the system. In the early comics as well as most media interpretations, he employs photojournalist Peter Parker to take pictures of Spider-Man in the hopes of catching him in the middle of wrongdoing, unaware that Peter is the superhero himself. Over the course of the comics, Jameson has done various other jobs, such as being the Mayor of New York City for several years before resigning. Peter has revealed his identity to Jameson twice: first during the "Civil War" event, which is undone by the events of "One More Day"; and the second time years later, which causes him to finally give up his crusade against Spider-Man and become a permanent ally and advocate of him.

Portrayals of Jameson in both the comics and external media have varied throughout the years. Sometimes he is shown as a foolishly grumpy, stubborn and pompous demagogue and micromanager whose resentment of Spider-Man is actually a thinly veiled exercise in envy. Other writers have portrayed him more empathetically, as a humorously obnoxious yet caring boss and family man who nevertheless has shown great bravery and integrity in the face of the assorted villains with which the Bugle comes into contact, and whose campaign against Spider-Man comes more from the aforementioned political motivations. Peter Parker's Aunt May became Jameson's stepmother when she married his father. Jameson's son John Jameson is a Marvel Universe supporting character who, in addition to his job as a famous astronaut, has become Man-Wolf and Star-God and also married She-Hulk, making Jonah her father-in-law before she and John divorced. In addition to Man-Wolf, he also serves as a principal figure in the creation of Spider-Man foes Spider-Slayer and Scorpion, as well as being the adoptive father of his niece Mattie Franklin, the third Spider-Woman.

The character has appeared in numerous media adaptations related to Spider-Man; he usually assumes his early role as Peter's employer, but this has lessened in recent years as depictions of Spider-Man focused around his science and superhero careers, with Jameson simply being Spider-Man's tormentor. Most famously, J. K. Simmons portrayed the character in Sam Raimi's Spider-Man trilogy (2002–2007) and in the Marvel Cinematic Universe films Spider-Man: Far From Home (2019) and Spider-Man: No Way Home (2021). Simmons also voices him in various additional works, such as Ultimate Spider-Man (2012–2017) and the animated film Spider-Man: Across the Spider-Verse (2023).

== Publication History ==
Created by writer Stan Lee and artist Steve Ditko, Jameson first appeared in The Amazing Spider-Man issue #1 (March 1963). Stan Lee stated in an interview on Talk of the Nation that he modeled J. Jonah Jameson as a much grumpier version of himself. Later Spider-Man writers Tom DeFalco and Gerry Conway agreed that J. Jonah Jameson was as close as Lee ever came to a self-portrayal, with Conway elaborating that "just like Stan is a very complex and interesting guy who both has a tremendously charismatic part of himself and is an honestly decent guy who cares about people, he also has this incredible ability to go immediately to shallow. Just, BOOM, right to shallow. And that's Jameson". Conway stated that whenever he wrote Jameson's dialogue, he would hear it in Lee's voice, and on one occasion even wrote a Jameson speech that was almost directly quoted from a Stan Lee speech.

The Spider-Man creative staff considered Jameson's wedding to Marla Madison in Amazing Spider-Man Annual #18 (1984) a momentous enough event that they asked Stan Lee to script the story, while the art team on the issue emulated Steve Ditko's style.

Jameson has been a mainstay of the Spider-Man supporting cast, and on a few rare occasions has been given a starring role, including Peter Parker, the Spectacular Spider-Man #80 (July 1983), Web of Spider-Man #52 (July 1989) (in which Spider-Man himself only appears in a single panel), and Spider-Man's Tangled Web #20 (January 2003).

== Fictional Character Biography ==
=== Background ===
According to "Behind the Mustache", a story featured in Spider-Man's Tangled Web #20 (January 2003), Jameson was raised as a child by David and Betty Jameson. David was an officer of the United States Army, a war veteran decorated as a hero; at home, however, David regularly abused his wife and son. As a result, J. Jonah Jameson grew convinced that "No one's a hero every day of the week" and "Even the real heroes can't keep it up all the time". Later issues of The Amazing Spider-Man clarified that David Jameson was in fact Jonah's foster father, and the brother of J. Jonah Jameson Sr., Jonah's biological father, who had to leave his son behind for undisclosed reasons.

He was a Boy Scout during his childhood. In high school, his interests were mainly boxing and photography. He met his first wife Joan when they both joined their high school's photo club. When the school's three top athletes started bullying him, he fought back and beat all three of them to a pulp. This impressed Joan and they started dating. They married as soon as they finished school.

After school, Jameson sought employment as a journalist. In Marvels #1, a young reporter brags to his colleagues that he would one day run the Daily Bugle; according to writer Kurt Busiek, he and artist Alex Ross intended this to be J. Jonah Jameson, but the editor of the Spider-Man line objected that Jameson was too young to have been alive during the early 1940s, when the story was set. Since it was too late to redraw the scene, the editor settled for having Jameson's name removed from the issue. When the U.S.A. joined World War II in 1941, Jameson served as a war correspondent in Europe. Sergeant Fury and His Howling Commandos #110 featured him as covering a mission of Sergeant Nicholas Fury, who was heading a team of commandos during the war.

After the war, he and Joan had a son John Jonah Jameson III, who grew up to become an astronaut. When Jameson returned from a journalistic mission in Korea, he was grieved to find that his wife Joan Jameson had died in a mugging incident. Focusing on his professional life to dull the pain, he was promoted to editor-in-chief of the Daily Bugle, and eventually came to own the paper, thereby fulfilling his earlier boasts.

=== Spider-Man ===
J. Jonah Jameson in The Amazing Spider-Man #29 (Oct. 1965), art by Steve Ditko

J. Jonah Jameson was part of the audience that saw Spider-Man's first TV broadcast. However, when Spider-Man becomes a masked vigilante, Jameson strives to blacken Spider-Man's reputation; casting the masked hero as an unhinged vigilante not only boosts the Daily Bugle's circulation, but also punishes Spider-Man for overshadowing John Jameson. When Spider-Man tries to counter the bad press by rescuing his son from danger, Jameson accuses the hero of staging the situation for his own benefit.

This episode sets a pattern with Jameson's and Spider-Man's relationship: Jameson publicly accusing Spider-Man of numerous crimes and misdeeds, only to feel continually obliged to print almost as many retractions after being proven wrong. The lead story of Amazing Spider-Man #2 (May 1963) sets another part of the pattern: Peter Parker selling pictures of himself as Spider-Man to the Bugle with few questions asked, and Jonah using the pictures to support his editorials against Spider-Man, unaware that he is giving him gainful employment in the process. After his accusations that Spider-Man is the notorious criminal overlord The Big Man are debunked, Jameson admits that he is jealous of Spider-Man's courage and selflessness. Jameson believes that he cannot look at himself as a good man while a hero like Spider-Man exists. Despite this, he openly idolizes Captain America, and Mary Jane Watson has suggested that Jameson hates Spider-Man mainly because he acts outside the law. A psychiatrist suggests that it is the mask that bothers him, and that when Jameson sees people who "claimed to be heroes, but covered their faces", he is subconsciously sure that they're hiding a horrible secret like his foster father was.

Jameson posts rewards for Spider-Man's capture or secret identity, hunts him with Spencer Smythe's Spider-Slayer robots, and even commissions superpowered agents to take down Spider-Man. Though best known for his crusades against vigilante superheroes like Spider-Man, Jameson does not hesitate to use the power of his paper against supervillains, crooked politicians, and crime bosses, including the Kingpin. (Note: In fact, the Kingpin's attempt to silence Jameson, and Spider-Man's attempt to rescue him, are central plot elements in the Kingpin's very first appearance.)

=== Relinquishing Control ===
The guilt for creating the Scorpion catches up with Jameson when the Hobgoblin blackmails him about it. When he receives the threats, rather than succumb to the Hobgoblin, Jameson chooses instead to reveal it to the world in a public editorial. He steps down as the Bugle's editor-in-chief, delegating the post to his immediate subordinate, Joseph "Robbie" Robertson, but Jameson remains its publisher.

Jonah's control of the Daily Bugle is bought out from under him by multimillionaire Thomas Fireheart. Fireheart had felt that he owed Spider-Man a debt of honor and in an attempt to repay the hero, he purchases the Daily Bugle and begins a pro-Spider-Man campaign. Jameson starts up a rival magazine which continues to produce anti-Spider-Man articles. Spider-Man finds Fireheart's campaign embarrassing at best, and after he repeatedly demands that he stop, Fireheart challenges Spider-Man to a battle to the death in New Mexico. He then sells the Bugle back to Jameson for the sum of one dollar, on the condition that he print an obituary "For either me, or Spider-Man". Jameson, though shocked by the request, takes the deal.

He is blackmailed into selling the Bugle to Norman Osborn after threats were made against his family; simultaneously, he is attacked and hounded by the supervillain Mad Jack. The time spent as a subordinate to Osborn took a heavy mental toll, almost driving him to attempted murder, but he is finally able to reclaim the Bugle after Osborn is driven underground by temporary insanity.

=== "Death" ===
When a duplicate of Spider-Man created by Mysterio jumps in front of Jameson's car while he is driving home from work one day, Jameson crashes his car into a tree. He is believed to have been killed in the car crash, dying upon impact, and the media blames Spider-Man for his tragic and untimely demise. Later, he is shown ascending to "the light", only for him to be condemned for all the injustices he committed in life. He is then shown descending into Mysterio's staged version of Hell, where he is tormented by a Spider-Man-themed demon, though this is revealed to just be a part of Mysterio's revenge on Jameson, but Spider-Man rescues him.

=== Spider-Man unmasked ===
Jameson's influence on the paper as its publisher is shown in the 2006–2007 Civil War: Front Line when he pressures his staff into supporting the federal government's Superhuman Registration Act, still directing the general tone of the paper, despite losing his more hands-on position. When Spider-Man unmasks and reveals himself to be Peter Parker, Jameson faints in shock at the realization that the man he had been calling a menace had actually been on his payroll for years. On top of the Parker revelation, Jameson is forced to deal with the notion that She-Hulk had now become his daughter-in-law. This was not helped by the fact that She-Hulk and Spider-Man had previously sued him for libel.

Jameson's reaction to the unmasking of Spider-Man as seen through the reflection on a television

It has been since revealed that Jameson had always believed that between him and Peter Parker was a bond of trust, and he had always regarded him as another son, the "last honest man" in the world; he had always bought Parker's photos, even the ones that he considered inferior, to help him financially in a discreet manner. After Peter's public confession, Jameson feels so betrayed and humiliated that it shatters their bond. He is determined to make Peter "pay", despite Parker (as enforcer) and Jameson both actively supporting the Superhuman Registration Act. He plans to sue Parker for fraud, demanding back all the money he paid Peter over the years. However, he learns that the government has granted Parker amnesty for all the acts he had done to protect his secret identity, which included taking photos of himself. Both this and his son's marriage to She-Hulk drive Jameson into a fit of rage, and he attacks his new daughter-in-law with the original Spider-Slayer. She easily destroys it, and to smooth things over, remarks that she will handle the lawsuit for fraud against Spider-Man (while privately intending to drag it out as long as possible).

Spider-Man later defects from the government's side in enforcing the Registration Act and joins with Captain America's Secret Avengers, openly rebelling against the new law and fighting those attempting to enforce it. Issues of Friendly Neighborhood Spider-Man reveal that Jameson posted a reward to capture Parker. He also commits libel against Parker by coercing his former girlfriend Debra Whitman into writing an untrue account of him; Betty Brant secretly supplies information about this to The Daily Globe, which publishes a front-page exposé.

Jameson's editor-in-chief and closest friend Robbie Robertson stands up to Jameson and his shoddy treatment of Peter/Spider-Man over the years. Unable or unwilling to admit that he has gone too far in his hatred of Spider-Man, Jameson fires Robertson. Later, Spider-Man learns of this from Betty Brant and decides that he and Jameson should have a long overdue "chat". Some time later, Jameson visits the Robertson house with two black eyes and a broken hand after being allowed to repeatedly attack Spider-Man and accidentally being hit in the face with a door.

=== Heart attacks and recuperation ===
Jameson has his first heart attack, a mild one, in The Amazing Spider-Man #70, while being threatened by Spider-Man when the latter finally loses his temper after many years of abuse and defamation.

After the status quo was revised in the "Brand New Day" storyline, Peter's identity is once again a secret. The Daily Bugle is suffering financially with Peter not selling as many Spider-Man pictures as usual and star reporter Ben Urich gone. These circumstances lead to Jameson facing a buyout from Dexter Bennett. Needing money for an apartment, Peter goes to the Bugle, claiming he is owed money. Jameson yells at him, causing Peter to snap and yell back, stating that his photographs kept the Bugle selling while Jameson raked in the profits and paid Peter a pittance. This causes Jameson to yell at Peter again, but he stops short, owing to a second heart attack. Peter provides CPR for Jameson to try and save him until the paramedics arrive; they rush Jameson to the hospital, where he rests before surgery. His wife talks to a lawyer about power of attorney and selling the final shares of the Bugle without Jameson having a say. When Peter, as Spider-Man, visits Jameson, he accidentally reveals that the Daily Bugle has sold to Dexter Bennett. This causes Jameson to have another heart attack, forcing Spider-Man to give him CPR.

Jameson's condition improves to the point where he has physiotherapy sessions and tai chi classes. However, he loses his temper if he sees or hears about Dexter Bennett and the Daily Bugle. He is also apparently facing problems with his wife, as he has yet to forgive her for selling the Bugle.

=== Mayor of New York ===
In a 2009 storyline, Jameson is elected the Mayor of New York City. Spider-Man is in another dimension with the Fantastic Four, resulting in a month going by on Earth while they are only away for a few hours. In his new office, Jameson receives a visit from his estranged father, J. Jonah Jameson Sr., demanding that Jameson cease his vendetta against Spider-Man — the reasons being Spider-Man's many heroic deeds and the fact that the Avengers and even Captain America had accepted Spider-Man. Spider-Man then enters the mayor's office, hoping to establish a truce with Jameson, only for Jameson to announce that he has assembled an "Anti-Spider Squad" to capture Spider-Man. Spider-Man responds by increasing his superhero work, committing heroic deeds all over the city simply to enrage Jameson. Jameson responds by putting his squad on double-shifts, severely straining the city council's budget.

==== Dark Reign ====
In the "Dark Reign" storyline, with Norman Osborn's rise to power, Dark Avengers member Spider-Man (really Mac Gargan) seeks revenge on Jameson. When Jameson arrives home, he finds a dead stripper on his bed. When Gargan starts a gang war, Jameson goes to Osborn to help and is given "Spider-Man". He later discovers this Spider-Man has caused the gang war and tries to confront Osborn, though Spider-Man's name is cleared when he appears to save the Big Apple Festival from Bullseye, Daken, and the gangs involved. Jameson's popularity jumps from having worked with Spider-Man to solve the problem, though he does not realize during the course of the events that he is dealing with a different Spider-Man.

Jameson also eventually learns that his father is marrying May Parker, something he personally does not like. But, he begrudgingly accepts it in the end. He even offers to pay for their ceremony out of his own pocket, and preside over it. The marriage also technically makes him Peter Parker's brother/cousin, something he very clearly dislikes.

==== The Gauntlet ====
During "The Gauntlet" storyline, Spider-Man tries to stop the Chameleon from exploding a bomb that would kill thousands. Jameson has his squad wearing Mandroid suits to attack Spider-Man, but Spider-Man cleverly uses his knowledge of the Mandroid suits to disarm the bomb instead. The squad decide not to follow their orders to arrest Spider-Man. Instead, they let him go. The next day, Jameson is shocked to learn that every member of the squad has resigned, and his aide tells him that Jameson is getting out of control, and that Spider-Man's heroics do not deserve a criminal's treatment. When Jameson yells about how much the public has to see Spider-Man as a menace, the aide snaps that this was not the Daily Bugle. The aide resigns, telling Jameson that he has to choose between Spider-Man or actually helping the city.

Jameson later gives a financial bailout to Dexter Bennett to keep the Bugle afloat. This leads to a public backlash which Electro uses to his advantage. Electro espouses taking down the Bugle. He sees it as a greedy corporation and draws energy from his citywide supporters by turning on all their electrical appliances. In a showdown with Spider-Man inside the Daily Bugle building, Dexter Bennett is crushed by rubble and the building is destroyed.

During Spider-Man's encounter with Vulture in Amazing Spider-Man #623–624, it is falsely stated by a mob boss that Jameson was responsible for his creation to get that Vulture to attack Jameson. As a result, Spider-Man has to fight with the Vulture to protect Jameson. Security guard Gabriel Graham, whom Jameson did not even know the name of before, gives up his life to protect Jameson from the Vulture. The self-sacrifice of Gabriel Graham greatly affects Jameson, and makes Peter decide to make a doctored photo showing Jameson trying to fight back against the Vulture. While the picture does, in fact, get back support for Jameson from the public, and eventually makes several people admit the truth of the situation, Jameson exposes the picture as a fake, and publicly fires Peter Parker.

==== Heroic Age ====
During the "Spider-Island" storyline, J. Jonah Jameson's popularity as the mayor has plummeted and his Anti-Spider-Man Squad is considered to be a huge tax drain. Jameson is shown to have been infected with spider powers and mutates into a spider-like creature. Jameson nearly kills Alistair Smythe, partly due to fact that he was responsible for the death of Jameson's wife. Jameson is eventually cured of the spider-virus, along with the rest of the citizens of New York.

During the Ends of the Earth storyline, Jameson shuts down Horizon Labs on the accusation that it conducts dangerous experiments and harbors criminals such as Morbius. Max Modell's lawyer Hector Baez fights the company's accusations. Jameson places the city under martial law, with his Anti-Spider-Man Squad patrolling the streets to prevent any looting.

==== Working with Superior Spider-Man ====
After Superior Spider-Man (Doctor Octopus controlling Spider-Man's body) stops the Sinister Six, Jameson comes to thank him personally, while Peter Parker's consciousness is shocked to see Jameson's drastically changed attitude towards the hero. On the top of the police station building Jameson, Chief Pratchett and Carlie Cooper stand near to the improvised "Spider-Signal". Jameson boasts about his wise ruling policy while Carlie doubts Superior Spider-Man will ever show up. But he finally does and short-circuits the signal. Jameson discharges oaths about wasted taxpayer dollars, and Superior Spider-Man explains they can hinder him using the signal, humiliating Jameson between the lines. When Massacre rigs the doors of Grand Central Station to explode, this even worries Jameson. While speaking in a press conference, Jameson is suddenly attacked by criminal pranksters Jester and Screwball, who assault their victims and broadcast it through the internet in a web-show called "Jested". Both pranksters humiliate Jameson and transmit it all over the world, where even Superior Spider-Man laughs it off. Then he gets summoned by Jameson himself to the City Hall, where he asks him to arrest Jester and Screwball. Superior Spider-Man dismisses it at first, but after Jameson reminded him of all the times Superior Spider-Man has pulled pranks on him, he agrees to catch them putting his Patrol App on course. Superior Spider-Man beats up Jester and Screwball where his brutality being watched all over the city including Jameson (who is enjoying the punishment).

During the attacks of the Goblin King's Goblin Underground, Jameson unveils the Goblin-Slayers, which he plans to use to combat the Goblin threat. Jameson orders to send one of the Goblin Slayers to the robbery location and then head to chase Superior Spider-Man. However, the Goblin-Slayers are taken over by Green Goblin. After regaining control of his body, Spider-Man visits Jameson's office to confront him after what happened and returns him the Spider-Bot that Doctor Octopus used to record his blackmail material. Jameson replies that he will not accept it since he would not believe whatever Spider-Man says, regarding him now as a "monster" that does not own up to the consequences of his actions and instead stomps on others. Spider-Man replies that he will not expect him to believe this but says that he should not fear him, and should not take the blame for everything that Green Goblin caused, but to stay and fight. Once Spider-Man leaves, Jameson reveals that he has resigned as Mayor of New York City.

=== A new direction ===
During the Original Sin storyline, the eye of Uatu revealed that J. Jonah Jameson had fired a former Daily Bugle employee for viewing an embarrassing article that he wrote in which he praised Spider-Man in his early days of being a wrestler. Jameson later established the Fact Channel. As Silk battles against Electro and Spider-Man deals with Black Cat, Jameson remains on the channel forcing the cameraman to film the action. Black Cat deviate one of Electro's bolts hitting Spider-Man, knocking him down in the process. Black Cat attempts to unmask Spider-Man as Jameson (who hears the truth concerning Doctor Octopus) aims the camera. However, Jameson's angle prevents anyone seeing Spider-Man's face long enough for Silk to knock Black Cat back and Spider-Man to put his mask back on.

After his father is hospitalized, Jameson visits New U Technologies to speak to the doctor. To give proof to Jameson that their talents of using a subject's DNA to clone replacement parts work, Jameson is surprised when the doctor calls in an apparent revived Marla Jameson. With his father's health having taken a turn for the worse, Peter has to endure Jameson's and May's concerns for his extreme skepticism for using New U, with his secret identity preventing him from informing them of the real reason he doubts them. Peter remains adamant of sticking to the conventional procedure and Jay has sided with him. Peter's superheroic endeavors prevent him from accompanying May and Jameson as Jay's health reaches critical status and he undergoes conventional surgery. To make matters worse, this is not enough and Jay dies. It is revealed that the revived Marla Jameson is a clone that the Jackal had gathered to grow clones with false memories that span all the way to their deaths.

After J. Jonah Jameson is taken to Haven with his clone wife, he asked the Jackal to revive his father. Jackal told him to head upstairs to promote New U Technologies on television. When Jameson is about to send out a broadcast message of New U Technologies, Jackal reactivated the broadcast to tell the world that they will all die and be reborn as the Carrion virus in all of the clones and causes them to start rapidly decaying. Jameson's broadcast causes the Carrion virus to spread worldwide. Spider-Man and Anna Maria Marconi arrive to stop the broadcast as Mattie reveals to Jameson her superpowers. After Spider-Man sends out the Webware Emergency Signal, Jameson and Silk find Marla and Mattie dead.

Following a tense confrontation with Spider-Man provoked by a rogue branch of S.H.I.E.L.D., Spider-Man agreed to an exclusive interview with Jameson that culminated in the wall-crawler revealing his secret identity, prompting Jameson to vow to be more supportive of the hero's efforts in future.

== Family members ==
Jameson family

Benjamin Franklin "Ben" Parker (Note: See also: Spider-Man family tree.) | Maybelle "May" Parker (née Reilly) | John Jonah "Jay" Jameson Sr. | Betty Burnoll | David Burnoll
Peter Benjamin Parker; Spider-Man | Joan Jameson | J. Jonah Jameson; John Jonah Jameson Jr. | Marla Madison | Bernice Franklin | Jerry Franklin
Mary Jane "MJ" Watson (Note: Ex-fiancée; Spider-Man (Sam Raimi film series) only.) | John Jonah Jameson III; Colonel Jupiter / Man-Wolf / Stargod | Jennifer Walters; She-Hulk (Note: Annulled; see also: Hulk family tree.) | Martha "Mattie" Franklin; Spider-Woman

Notes:

Here are the known family members of J. Jonah Jameson:

- David Jameson Burnoll — The stepfather of J. Jonah Jameson. Later revealed to be also his paternal uncle, having taken his wife's name after she left Jay Jameson for him.
- J. Jonah "Jay" Jameson Sr. — The estranged father of J. Jonah Jameson. He later becomes married to Aunt May. In The Clone Conspiracy storyline, Jay later died in the hospital.
- Betty Burnoll — The mother of J. Jonah Jameson.
- Joan Jameson — The first wife of J. Jonah Jameson.
- John Jameson — The son of J. Jonah Jameson who works as an astronaut.
- Marla Madison — The second wife of J. Jonah Jameson. She was later killed by Alistair Smythe.
- Peter Parker — The step-cousin (self-declared step-brother) of J. Jonah Jameson.
- May Parker — The step-mother of J. Jonah Jameson, and maternal aunt (and adoptive mother) of Peter Parker.
- Jennifer Walters — The daughter-in-law of J. Jonah Jameson and ex-wife of John Jameson.
- Martha "Mattie" Franklin — The adoptive daughter and biological niece of J. Jonah Jameson who is secretly the superhero Spider-Woman. She is later killed by Sasha Kravinoff.
- Jerry Franklin — The brother-in-law of J. Jonah Jameson, husband of Bernice and father of Mattie, who is in a cult with Norman Osborn, Morris Maxwell, Cassandra Webb, and Gregory Herd.
- Bernice Franklin — The deceased younger sister of Marla Madison, wife of Jerry and mother of Mattie.
- Mary Jane Watson — The ex-fiancée of John Jameson in Sam Raimi's Spider-Man 2 (2004).

== Other versions ==
Various alternate universe versions of J. Jonah Jameson have appeared throughout the character's publication history.

- In 1602: New World, Jameson is an Irish colonist and friend of Ananias Dare.
- In Edge of Spider-Verse, Jameson is a spider-powered hero also known as Headline.
- In Earth X, Jameson was transformed into a donkey-like form after being exposed to Terrigen Mist.
- In House of M, Jameson is the publicist of Peter Parker, here a celebrity without a secret identity.
- In Spider-Man: Life Story, a series that does not adhere to a floating timeline, Jameson is arrested in 1966 for his role in creating the Spider-Slayers and Scorpion. After his release in 2001, Jameson finds an exosuit gifted to him by Norman Osborn and kills Scorpion before dying of a heart attack.
- In the Ultimate Universe imprint, Jameson is a family friend of the Parker family.

=== What If? ===
J. Jonah Jameson appeared in various issues of What If?, which imagines changes to Marvel continuity during crucial points in history. What If? #24 of the first volume (December 1980), in which Jameson exposes Spider-Man's secret identity to the public, is one of the most highly regarded stories of the series. Issue #82 of the second volume ponders history had Jameson adopted Parker. While this version of Jameson is actually more supportive of Peter, he still harbors his hatred of Spider-Man, until he has a change of heart. In another issue that imagines history had Parker's uncle, Ben Parker, not died as a result of Parker's initial lack of responsibility, Spider-Man becomes a successful entertainer, and uses his wealth and influence to shut down Jameson's paper and ruin his life. Jameson in turn becomes a criminal who organizes the Sinister Six to get revenge on Spider-Man.

== In other media ==
=== Television ===
- J. Jonah Jameson appears in Spider-Man (1967), voiced by Paul Kligman. This version is an egotistical, greedy, and cowardly braggart who constantly berates his employees and automatically accuses Spider-Man of any crime, even when the evidence contradicts him. While he maintains these traits throughout the series, the second season prequel episode "King Pinned" portrays Jameson's attitude toward Spider-Man as being originally warmer, even going as far as to stand up to the Kingpin, help the web-slinger defeat him, and expose the Kingpin's drug counterfeiting racket during their first meeting.
- J. Jonah Jameson appears in Spider-Man (1977) and The Amazing Spider-Man (1978), portrayed by David White and Robert F. Simon respectively. Both versions are portrayed as a more avuncular figure, with his abrasive, flamboyant personality being toned down.
- J. Jonah Jameson appears in Spider-Man (1981), voiced by Bill Woodson. This version has a sniveling nephew named Mortimer, who also works at the Daily Bugle.
- J. Jonah Jameson appears in Spider-Man and His Amazing Friends, voiced again by Bill Woodson.
- J. Jonah Jameson appears in Spider-Man: The Animated Series, voiced by Ed Asner. This version's dislike of Spider-Man is based less on his powers and deeds and more on his hiding his identity behind a mask as his wife was killed by a masked gunman. Furthermore, he owns a station called "J3 Communications" in addition to the Daily Bugle and previously worked as a cub reporter nicknamed "Jigsaw". The series also portrays his integrity as a journalist as he refuses to cover up the truth even when it is in his best interests and demonstrates loyalty to his employees, such as helping Peter Parker by hiring Matt Murdock as his defense attorney when Parker was framed by Richard Fisk for selling government secrets to foreign powers and aiding Robbie Robertson when Tombstone and Fisk frame him for their crimes.
  - An alternate reality version of Jameson who does not hate Spider-Man and became Peter Parker's godfather appears in the series finale "Farewell Spider-Man".
- J. Jonah Jameson makes a cameo appearance in the pilot episode of Spider-Man Unlimited (1999), voiced by Richard Newman.
- J. Jonah Jameson appears in Spider-Man: The New Animated Series, voiced by Keith Carradine.
  J. Jonah Jameson in The Spectacular Spider-Man
- J. Jonah Jameson appears in The Spectacular Spider-Man, voiced by Daran Norris. This version sports a soul patch along with his trademark mustache and displays a level of hyperactivity not seen in any of his previous incarnations as well as an obsession with time, punctuality, and deadlines similar to J. K. Simmons' portrayal. Aside from these traits, he retains his dislike of Spider-Man, though he displays a fondness for Peter Parker, and maintains his cynical, avuncular, brusque attitude with his staff. In the second season, Jameson's hatred for Spider-Man is worsened after the former convinces his son John Jameson to become a superhero, only for John to be sent to Ravencroft following a fight with the web-slinger.
- J. Jonah Jameson appears in The Avengers: Earth's Mightiest Heroes episode "Along Came a Spider", voiced by J. K. Simmons. Following the Skrulls' invasion of Earth, Jameson believes that Captain America betrayed the world, not knowing it was a Skrull disguised as him. Several high-level individuals, such as Tony Stark and the President, attempted to convince him otherwise, but to no avail. Despite this, Jameson is willing to send Peter Parker and Betty Brant to find proof of Captain America's innocence. After Spider-Man and Captain America save people from the Serpent Society, Jameson begrudgingly has the Daily Bugle print the story and changes his mind about Captain America.
- J. Jonah Jameson appears in Ultimate Spider-Man, voiced again by J. K. Simmons. This version is an anchorman for Daily Bugle Communications who defaces and mistrusts masked vigilantes based on the collateral damage they cause.
  - Additionally, the four-part episode "The Spider-Verse" features several alternate reality versions of Jameson all voiced by J.K. Simmons: a Marvel 2099 incarnation, J. Joanna Jameson from a gender-inverted universe, a Marvel Noir incarnation who specializes in radio broadcasts, J. Jonah Jackal from Spider-Ham's universe, a town crier from a medieval-themed universe, and a variation of Jameson's Ultimate Marvel counterpart who views Miles Morales as a menace.
- J. Jonah Jameson appears in Avengers Assemble, voiced again by J. K. Simmons.
- J. Jonah Jameson appears in Hulk and the Agents of S.M.A.S.H., voiced again by J. K. Simmons.
  - Additionally, the five-part episode "Days of Future Smash" features several alternate timeline versions of Jameson all voiced by J.K. Simmons: a dinosaur named J. Jonah Jamesasaurus, a vampire who advocates for humans to convert to vampirism, and a Hydra-affiliated version subservient to the Leader.
- J. Jonah Jameson appears in Marvel Disk Wars: The Avengers.
- J. Jonah Jameson appears in Lego Marvel Super Heroes: Maximum Overload, voiced again by J. K. Simmons.
- J. Jonah Jameson appears in Spider-Man (2017), voiced by Bob Joles.
- J. Jonah Jameson appears in Lego Marvel Avengers: Strange Tails, voiced by Steve Blum.

=== Film ===
- James Cameron's original script for what eventually became Spider-Man (2002) depicted Jameson as a TV executive instead of editor-in-chief of the Daily Bugle who has a strong dislike for the titular hero and attempts to defame him. Additionally, Cameron had wanted R. Lee Ermey for the role.
- While J. Jonah Jameson does not appear in The Amazing Spider-Man film series, he is referenced as Peter Parker's employer in The Amazing Spider-Man 2 (2014) and tie-in comics. J. K. Simmons, who previously portrayed Jameson in Sam Raimi's Spider-Man trilogy, expressed interest in returning as Jameson for the films.

==== Raimi trilogy ====
J. Jonah Jameson appears in Raimi's Spider-Man film trilogy (Spider-Man, Spider-Man 2, and Spider-Man 3), portrayed by J. K. Simmons. This version is a blustering, bombastic, obsessive, hyperactive man who retains his dislike for Spider-Man, taking delight in anything that might discredit or defame him. Nonetheless, he remains a good man at his core.

==== Spider-Verse ====
J. Jonah Jameson, based on his counterpart from Spider-Man (1967), appears in the post-credits scene of Spider-Man: Into the Spider-Verse (2018), voiced by the film's editorial associate production manager, Adam Brown.

In the sequel Spider-Man: Across the Spider-Verse (2023), J. K. Simmons reprised his role as several alternate reality versions of Jameson from Earth-1610, Earth-65, and Earth-42, designed after the balding MCU Jameson, providing original dialogue; a Lego figure of Jameson from Earth-13122 also makes a cameo appearance, voiced by archival audio of Simmons as Jameson from Sam Raimi's Spider-Man (2002).

==== Marvel Cinematic Universe ====
Simmons reprised the role of J. Jonah Jameson in Spider-Man: Far From Home, making him the first live-action character to be portrayed by the same actor in two different franchises.

J. Jonah Jameson appears in media set in the Marvel Cinematic Universe (MCU), portrayed by J. K. Simmons. He appears in the film Spider-Man: Far From Home (2019), The Daily Bugle web series (2019–2022), and the film Spider-Man: No Way Home (2021). Simmons also makes an uncredited cameo appearance as the MCU Jameson in the mid-credits scene of the Sony's Spider-Man Universe (SSU) film Venom: Let There Be Carnage (2021), and in a deleted scene in Morbius (2022).

Introduced in Far From Home, this version is unrelated to the version that Simmons first portrayed in Raimi's trilogy. Instead, this Jameson appears as the host of TheDailyBugle.net, a sensationalist "InfoWars-type video platform". While he has the same hair color as his Raimi films' counterpart, Simmons does not wear a toupée to emulate Jameson's flattop hairstyle; appearing bald instead to differentiate his differing portrayals. Additionally, Simmons announced that he has signed on to play Jameson for more films in the MCU and SSU.

=== Video games ===
- J. Jonah Jameson appears in The Amazing Spider-Man vs. The Kingpin.
- J. Jonah Jameson appears in Marvel Super Heroes vs. Street Fighter via the "Night-Cooking" game show stage if Spider-Man is one of the fighters present.
- J. Jonah Jameson appears in Spider-Man (2000), voiced by Dee Bradley Baker.
- J. Jonah Jameson appears in the Xbox version of Spider-Man (2002), voiced by Jay Gordon.
- J. Jonah Jameson appears in the Spider-Man 2 film tie-in game, voiced again by Jay Gordon and by J. K. Simmons in the PSP version. He initially supports Quentin Beck's claims that Spider-Man is a fraud, but accuses the two of working together after learning Beck is Mysterio.
- J. Jonah Jameson appears in the Spider-Man 3 film tie-in game, voiced by J. K. Simmons.
- J. Jonah Jameson appears in the Spider-Man pinball machine by Stern Pinball, voiced again by J. K. Simmons.
- J. Jonah Jameson appears in the PlayStation 2 and PlayStation Portable versions of Spider-Man: Web of Shadows, voiced again by Daran Norris.
- J. Jonah Jameson appears in Marvel vs. Capcom 3: Fate of Two Worlds via the Daily Bugle stage and Spider-Man's arcade mode ending. In the latter, he claims to Peter Parker that Spider-Man defeating Galactus is a hoax and that he was actually working with him the entire time.
- J. Jonah Jameson makes a cameo appearance in Spider-Man: Edge of Time, voiced by Fred Tatasciore.
- J. Jonah Jameson appears in Marvel Heroes, voiced by Kyle Hebert.
- J. Jonah Jameson appears in Lego Marvel Super Heroes, voiced by John DiMaggio.
- J. Jonah Jameson appears in The Amazing Spider-Man 2 film tie-in game, voiced again by Fred Tatasciore.
- J. Jonah Jameson appears in Spider-Man Unlimited (2014), voiced again by Kyle Hebert. He is initially a non-playable character (NPC) before a mutated version of Jameson from the "Spider-Island" storyline was added as a playable character in a later update.
- J. Jonah Jameson appears in Disney Infinity 2.0, voiced again by Kyle Hebert.
- J. Jonah Jameson appears in Marvel vs. Capcom: Infinite via the New Metro City stage.
- J. Jonah Jameson appears in Lego Marvel Super Heroes 2, voiced by Glenn Wrage.
- J. Jonah Jameson appears in Insomniac Games' Spider-Man series, voiced by Darin De Paul. Following the events of the tie-in prequel novel Spider-Man: Hostile Takeover, he has begun his own podcast called "Just the Facts with J. Jonah Jameson".
  - In Marvel's Spider-Man (2018), he takes the role of a conspiracy theorist, airing his own uncensored, unsubstantiated, personal views on what he feels is wrong with New York. These usually tie back to Spider-Man in some way, such as blaming him for the fallout of Wilson Fisk's arrest and claiming he was in league with the Sinister Six. Another podcast reveals Mac Gargan has filed a lawsuit against Jameson for his role in turning the former into the Scorpion.
  - In Spider-Man: Miles Morales (2020), Jameson continues to air his podcast while directing his attention towards the new Spider-Man and frequently clashing with Danika Hart, who hosts a pro-Spider-Man podcast called "The Danikast".
  - In Spider-Man 2 (2023), Jameson has returned to running the Daily Bugle, with Mary Jane Watson working directly under him until she eventually quits. Near the beginning of the game the Spider-men have to save him from a limo after Sandman’s attack, a situation he is not happy with.

=== Parodies ===
- Parodies of the Sam Raimi Spider-Man trilogy incarnation of J. Jonah Jameson appear in The Simpsons, all voiced by J. K. Simmons. In the episode "Moe'N'a Lisa", Simmons guest stars as Jameson, now a publisher who demands pictures, stories, and poems about Spider-Man. In the episode "Homerazzi", Simmons voices a similar character who works as the publisher of The Springfield Inquisitor. In the episode "3 Scenes Plus a Tag from a Marriage", Simmons voices J.J. Gruff, Marge Simpson's editor.
- J. Jonah Jameson appears in VH1's ILL-Ustrated's Spider-Man 2 parody, in which he is portrayed as a Dr. Dre look-alike.
- A parody of J. Jonah Jameson based on J. K. Simmons' portrayal appears in Superhero Movie, portrayed by John Getz. This character is a mental patient who claims that hamburgers can tell the future, he knows the mayor of Venus, and that he can start fires with his mind.
- Two characters inspired by J. Jonah Jameson, both based on J. K. Simmons' performance, appear in the Ben 10 franchise: J. Jonah "Jimmy" Jones (voiced by Scott Menville), a child who exposes Ben Tennyson's identity to the world in Ben 10: Ultimate Alien, and Will Harangue (voiced by John DiMaggio), a news anchor and host of Harangue Nation who believes Ben to be a "menace" to society and often attempts to have him killed.
- J. Jonah Jameson appears in the Robot Chicken episode "Gimme That Chocolate Milk", voiced again by J. K. Simmons. In the first sketch, he attends a press conference held by the Mayor of Santa Fe revolving around the Santa Fe High School shooting and demands that Spider-Man be arrested. In the second sketch, he receives Peter Parker's latest picture of Spider-Man and adds it to his secret room of Spider-Man pictures as he secretly likes him.

=== Novelizations ===
- J. Jonah Jameson appears in the 1978 novel Mayhem in Manhattan, written by Len Wein and Marv Wolfman.
- Reference is made to J. Jonah Jameson in the 2005 Fantastic Four film novelization, although the character is never explicitly named as such. After he and his team save people on a bridge, Mister Fantastic is shown on numerous television channels talking about the Fantastic Four and recognizes a man with a small mustache. This is accompanied by the headline FANTASTIC FOUR: HEROES OR MENACE, which came from the owner of a major newspaper.
- J. Jonah Jameson appears in the Spider-Man (2018) prequel novel Spider-Man: Hostile Takeover. Having retired from the Daily Bugle some time ago, Echo convinces Jameson to launch a radio segment, which he plans to use to help turn the public's opinion against Spider-Man. After learning Echo's funding came from the Kingpin and following the crime lord's public fall from grace, Jameson immediately cuts all ties with them and subsequently plans to launch his own independent podcast.

=== Theatre ===
J. Jonah Jameson appears in Spider-Man: Turn Off the Dark, portrayed by Michael Mulheren.

=== Theme parks ===
J. Jonah Jameson appears in The Amazing Adventures of Spider-Man at Islands of Adventure, voiced by Chris Edgerly. With the Daily Bugle's staff having fled due to an attack by the Sinister Syndicate, Jameson recruits the riders to cover the story. At the end of the ride, Jameson is seen floating in his office due to Spider-Man rigging Doctor Octopus' anti-gravity cannon on him.

=== Miscellaneous ===
In the BBC radio play adapting the early Spider Man issues, which was produced by Dirk Maggs, Jameson is voiced by Bill Roberts. Maggs considered Roberts' performance "the definitive version" of the character.
