= Amazing Spider-Man/Venom: Death Spiral =

2026 comic book storyline by Marvel Comics

"Death Spiral"
- Publisher: Marvel Comics
- Publication date: February – May 2026
- Main characters: Spider-Man (Peter Parker); Venom (Mary Jane Watson); Eddie Brock / Carnage; Torment

Creative team
- Writer(s): Joe Kelly; Al Ewing; Charles Soule

Amazing Spider-Man/Venom: Death Spiral is a 2026 comic book storyline published by Marvel Comics. It was written by Joe Kelly, Al Ewing, and Charles Soule. The storyline follows Spider-Man, Mary Jane Watson / Venom, and Eddie Brock / Carnage as they contend with a mysterious serial killer named Torment. Torment targets specific people and their relatives, beginning with the most distant relatives and progressing toward those closest to the target.

== Production ==
Joe Kelly and Al Ewing announced the Amazing Spider-Man/Venom: Death Spiral storyline in January 2026, a crossover between The Amazing Spider-Man Volume 7, Venom Volume 6, and the recently-ended Eddie Brock: Carnage. Death Spiral involves Spider-Man, Venom, and Carnage contending with a mysterious serial killer called Torment. The story was notable for killing off Paul Rabin, a highly unpopular character of the series.

== Plot ==
A serial killer begins killing various people with the last names of Parker and Brock, with two stories covered by the Daily Bugle. Meanwhile, Eddie Brock works to keep Carnage under control as the two go looking for someone named Torment. While in Central Park with Agent Anti-Venom, Mary Jane Watson gets a call from Paul Rabin about Eddie Brock, causing her to leave and transform into Venom. As Eddie sleeps, Carnage unlocks his phone and sees a text from Torment, stating that Torment plans to go after Mary Jane.

Venom confronts Lady Octopus and Shocker about Tombstone's activities as Spider-Man arrives. After Spider-Man mistakes her for Eddie Brock, Mary Jane reveals her identity as Venom to him. After returning home, Shocker is attacked by Torment, who reveals that Shocker is distantly related to Mary Jane Watson through his aunt, who married into Mary Jane's family. Meanwhile, Peter reveals to Mary Jane that Carnage knows his secret identity and is coming after him and his loved ones. The police arrive at Shocker's apartment to find him dead and a message on the wall stating "Carnage Ruled".

Spider-Man and Venom go to the Bar with No Name and visit Boomerang, who agrees to spread the news of Shocker's death and the potential whereabouts of Torment. Spider-Man and Venom are called to meet with Tombstone, who blames Carnage for Shocker's murder and intends to kill him. Eddie Brock learns about the death of his relatives and believes that his father Carl Brock is Torment's next target. Eddie attempts to save Carl, but is unsuccessful. Torment kills Carl Brock and is revealed to have taken Shocker's gauntlets for his use.

Eddie confronts Torment, who dodges his attacks and attacks him with Shocker's gauntlets. Back in Manhattan, Spider-Man recovers as he and Venom continue to go after Carnage. Spider-Man and Venom catch up to Torment, but are trapped by Carnage, who reveals that Eddie is unconscious within it. With Eddie Brock unconscious, Spider-Man and Venom struggle against Torment and Carnage. As Venom lunges towards Carnage and Torment, Torment blasts Venom off Mary Jane's body. Eddie wakes up and retakes control of Carnage, intending to get answers from it. Across town, Miles Morales is with Norman Osborn, who plans to train Miles and the younger spiders to defend themselves against him. (Note: Norman Osborn's story is continued in the series Amazing Spider-Man: Spider-Versity.) Mary Jane calls Agent Anti-Venom to protect her aunt Anna Watson. Meanwhile, Torment arrives at Paul Rabin and Dylan Brock's apartment. Paul tries to protect Dylan, but is stabbed by Torment and dies as Torment escapes. As Spider-Man and Carnage fight Torment, Carnage separates from Eddie and bonds with Torment.

Spider-Man states that Torment will complete the "spiral" by going after Aunt May and Anna Watson, who are currently at the F.E.A.S.T. center. Spider-Man follows Torment to Chez Marco and saves a man who Torment states to be Spider-Man's cousin. Using Shocker's gauntlets, Torment knocks Spider-Man out and flees as the restaurant is set on fire. The man who Spider-Man saved helps him out of the building as Torment heads to the F.E.A.S.T. center. Torment attacks May and Anna, but they are saved by Agent Anti-Venom. Carnage's killing of homeless people proves too much for Torment, who blasts Carnage away. An injured Carnage leaves Torment and bonds with Spider-Man.

Possessed by Carnage, Spider-Man continues his fight with Torment, removing his left gauntlet. Eddie takes the gauntlet and knocks out Carnage, allowing Spider-Man to get free. As Torment catches up to May and Anna, Venom arrives to save them as Venom removes Torment from the building and drops him off the roof, killing him. Eddie surrenders to the police in exchange for leniency. Carnage, presumed dead, survives by bonding with small animals. Somewhere in Hudson Valley, a man named Mr. Crane is driving in his car and arranges a genetic screening after what he found out about his relatives. Crane is implied to be related to Spider-Man.

=== Aftermath ===
In a flashback set prior to Torment's death, he confronts a man named Rory Conway whose parents, brother, uncle, and cousin were killed. It is revealed that Torment's real name is Graham and that he had a large family, including his great-aunt Gladys. Graham would later sneak his girlfriend Laura Weddle out late at night, where she discovered that Graham killed her mother. Torment kills Rory and then states that he often chooses his targets who are at the center of a spiral. Torment receives a text about Peter Parker and Eddie Brock while also learning that Peter Parker is Spider-Man. In the present, following Graham's funeral, Gladys tells Graham's siblings that they better not turn out like Graham and tells Susan to redeem the family name. Susan then starts to see spirals like Torment did.

== Issues involved ==
The involved issues are listed in order of publication:

- Amazing Spider-Man/Venom: Death Spiral #1
- The Amazing Spider-Man (vol. 7) #23
- Venom (vol. 6) #255
- The Amazing Spider-Man (vol. 7) #24
- The Amazing Spider-Man (vol. 7) #25
- Venom (vol. 6) #256
- The Amazing Spider-Man (vol. 7) #26
- Venom (vol. 6) #257
- The Amazing Spider-Man (vol. 7) #27
- Amazing Spider-Man/Venom: Death Spiral Body Count #1
- The Amazing Spider-Man (vol. 7) #28
- Venom (vol. 6) #258

== Reception ==
Amazing Spider-Man/Venom: Death Spiral #1 received generally positive reviews from critics. Comic Book RoundUp lists a critic rating of 8.4 out of 10, based on five professional reviews.

Collier Jennings of AIPT rated the issue 8.5 out of 10, praising its character work and artwork. He described the issue as a strong foundation for the crossover, while criticizing Torment's introduction for lacking the impact of previous Spider-Man villains.

TravisComicHaven of Nerd Initiative gave the issue a 9.5 out of 10, praising its storytelling, artwork, mystery, and character development.

Henry Davis of Comic Watch gave the issue a 7 out of 10, describing it as a slow yet methodical beginning to the crossover. Davis praised the development of Peter Parker, Mary Jane Watson, and Eddie Brock, while noting that it establishes the emotional and character stakes for the crossover and has considerable potential.

Howard Smith of Impulse Gamer rated the issue 4 out of 5, praising its storytelling, artwork, coloring, and lettering. Smith also highlighted the issue's surprises and its exploration of the struggle of finding oneself again, as well as the introduction of a new character who could affect the direction of the Spider-Man storyline.
