= Clayton Crain =

American comic book artist

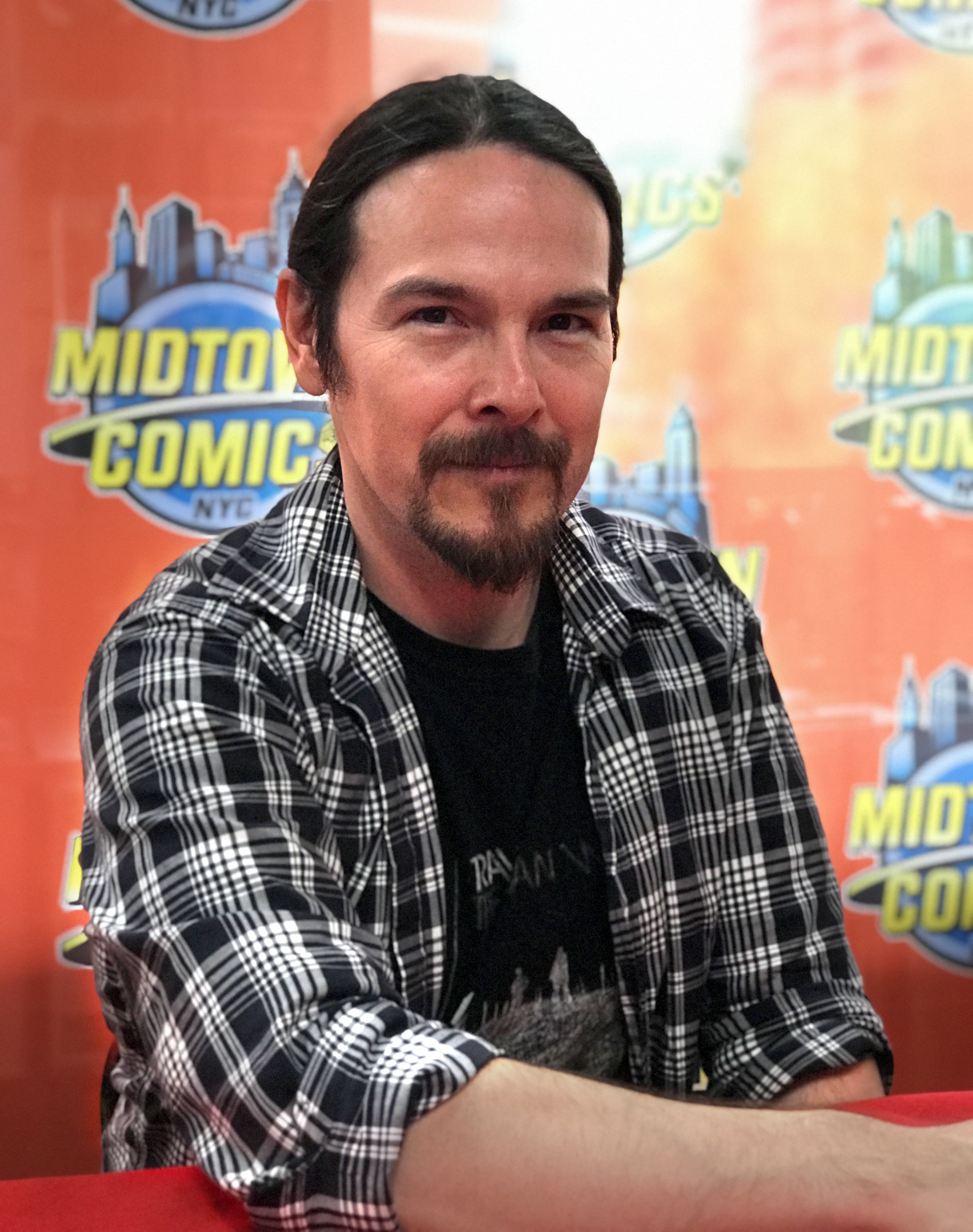
- Crain at a signing for Avengers (Vol 8) #1 at Midtown Comics in Manhattan
- Born: 1975 (age 50–51)
- Area: Digital painting
- Notable works: Ghost Rider: Trail of Tears; Ghost Rider: Road to Damnation; Venom vs. Carnage; X-Force; Carnage: Family Feud; Carnage, U.S.A.

Clayton Crain (born 1975) is an American comic book artist known for his digital painted work on Marvel Comics books such as Ghost Rider, X-Force, and Carnage, and also on the Valiant Comics series Rai. Crain is also known for his work with Todd McFarlane, covers for DC, and his unique sketch cover acrylic paintings.

== Early life ==
Clayton Crain grew up in Moxee, Washington with his parents and older sister. He was sketching on his schoolwork from a very early age and made the definitive choice to be a comic book illustrator at the age of 14 after seeing The Amazing Spider-Man #315.

== Career ==
Crain's career began with Acclaim Comics after he showed editor Fabian Nicieza a 5-page original story board of his artwork. His first book was Shadowman issues 16–20. Crain went on to work on various projects for Todd McFarlane, Top Cow Productions, Marvel Comics, and DC Comics.

Crain works for Valiant Comics on the book Rai, with writer Matt Kindt.

== Bibliography ==
=== Self-published ===
- Impure #1-?
- 342 #1-?

=== Acclaim ===
- Shadowman #16-20 (1998), his first professional work (as Klayton Krain)

=== Image ===
- Curse of the Spawn #24-29 (1998–99)
- Kiss Psycho Circus #18-31 (1999–2000)
- Darkness, vol. 1, #34-36
- Sam & Twitch #14
- No Honor #1-4
- Universe #1-8
- Tom Judge: End Of Days #1
- "Savior" 1-8 (2015)

=== Marvel ===
- Amazing Spider-Man #538 (variant cover, 2007)
- Ant-Man #1-4 (unpublished)
- Carnage: Family Feud #1–5 (2010–2011)
- Carnage, U.S.A. #1–5 (2012)
- Four #29 (cover, 2006)
- Ghost Rider: Road to Damnation miniseries, #1-6 (2005–06)
- Ghost Rider: Trail of Tears miniseries, #1-6 (2007)
- Wolverine/Punisher miniseries, #4 (Marvel Knights (cover, 2004)
- Sensational Spider-man vol. 2 (interiors): #26, 28, 39–40; (covers): #27, #30-33 (2006–07)
- Silver Surfer, vol. 3, #10 (cover, 2004)
- Spider-Geddon, Limited Series, #0 (interiors, cover) (2018)
- Superior Carnage #1–5 and Superior Carnage Annual #1 (covers, 2013–2014)
- Toxin, miniseries, #2 (cover, 2005)
- Thunderbolts #114 (variant cover, 2007)
- Ultimate Comics Fallout #4 (2011)
- Venom #14 (cover, 2004)
- Venom/Carnage, miniseries, #1-4 (2004)
- X-Force vol. 3 #1-6, 11–16, 21-25 (2009–2010)

=== Collections ===
Trade paperback collections include:

- Ghost Rider:
  - Road to Damnation (Marvel, 6-issue mini-series, 2005, July 2006 ISBN 0-7851-1592-7)
  - Trail of Tears (Marvel, 6-issue mini-series, 2007, September 2007, ISBN 0-7851-2003-3)
