= Lady Octopus =

Marvel Comics supervillain

- Marvel Masterpieces (1996) lithograph of Lady Octopus. Art by Boris Vallejo.

Publication information
- Publisher: Marvel Comics
- First appearance: The Amazing Spider-Man #406 (October 1995)
- Created by: J. M. DeMatteis; Angel Medina

In-story information
- Alter ego: Carolyn Trainer
- Species: Human
- Team affiliations: Sinister Syndicate; Sinister Squadron
- Notable aliases: Doctor Octopus
- Abilities: Genius-level intellect; Wears super-strong and highly-resistant mechanical appendages, impervious to conventional attacks and armed with lasers; Force-field generation via harness

Lady Octopus (Carolyn Trainer), also known as Doctor Octopus, is a supervillain appearing in American comic books published by Marvel Comics, primarily as an enemy of the superheroes Spider-Man and Scarlet Spider. The character is the protégée of Otto Octavius, the original Doctor Octopus, and assumes her mentor's mantle and an upgraded version of his tentacle harness following Octavius' death in the "Clone Saga". After Octavius' resurrection only a few years later, she becomes Lady Octopus to distinguish herself from him, and has made minor appearances in several stories since.

== Publication history ==
Lady Octopus first appeared in The Amazing Spider-Man #406 (October 1995) and was created by writer J.M. DeMatteis and artist Angel Medina.

== Fictional character biography ==
Carolyn Trainer is the daughter of Seward Trainer and a student of Otto Octavius. After Octavius is killed by Kaine Parker during the "Clone Saga", Carolyn sought to continue his legacy.

Trainer obtains a four-tentacle harness identical to the one used by Octavius, which she upgrades with a force field. She takes the "Doctor Octopus" name in honor of her instructor and begins a campaign to steal her father's research in merging reality and virtual reality.

Doctor Octopus works for the Master Programmer, a digitized copy of Otto Octavius' mind, and works with the Hand to resurrect the real Octavius.

Carolyn Trainer made a small appearance in "Secret War". She now calls herself Lady Octopus to distinguish her from her mentor. She was given a new suit of armor by Lucia von Bardas and Tinkerer. She and Hobgoblin are sent to assassinate Captain America, but are defeated. Von Bardas activates the devices in the villains' suits, linking them together to a giant bomb. After Daisy Johnson stops von Bardas, Lady Octopus and the other villains von Bardas manipulated are hospitalized with severe injuries.

Lady Octopus is among the villains hired by Walter Declun to battle Black Panther and the Fantastic Four after they uncover his plot to destabilize all of Wakanda on Doctor Doom's behalf. Declun upgrades the villains' technological equipment to aid them.

In The Amazing Spider-Man (vol. 5), Lady Octopus joins the Sinister Syndicate. Lady Octopus appears with the Sinister Syndicate in "Sinister War", where they are among the factions manipulated by Kindred to target Spider-Man.

During the "Gang War" storyline, Lady Octopus accompanies Beetle, Scorpia, and Trapstr in providing aid to White Rabbit and her henchman Kareem when they are attacked by Black Mariah's group. Lady Octopus and the Sinister Syndicate raid Sugar Hill and battle members of Diamondback's gang, finding that the rest of Diamondback's gang were defeated by Rose and Digger. Lady Octopus and the Sinister Syndicate fight Rose and Digger, with Digger ripping off some of Lady Octopus' tentacles. A group of armored soldiers arrive and capture Rose, leaving Digger behind. While Beetle has a parley with Madame Masque, Lady Octopus works on repairing her tentacles. Lady Octopus later takes part in the fight in Central Park.

In the miniseries Spider-Society, Lady Octopus joins the Sinister Squadron in attacking the eponymous Spider-Society in an attempt to prevent it from forming.

During the "Amazing Spider-Man/Venom: Death Spiral" storyline, Mary Jane Watson as Venom pursues Lady Octopus to get information on Tombstone's activities. Shocker attacks Spider-Man, allowing him and Lady Octopus to escape. Shocker is later murdered by Torment; Lady Octopus is with Tombstone when he explains his intents to kill Carnage, blaming him for Shocker's murder.

== Powers and abilities ==
Lady Octopus demonstrating a personal force-field.

Lady Octopus possesses no superhuman abilities. Instead, she wears a special harness, similar to the one used by the original Doctor Octopus, which incorporates four strong and highly-resistant mechanical appendages, which can be extended or retracted at will. These "tentacles" can lift weights far greater than any human, be used as a means of transportation, and respond faster than human reaction times. They are also armed with lasers and can generate a force-field; the result of upgrades she had made to the harness. The force-field is resistant to most traumatic concussive force and conventional weapons attack, though the tentacles themselves are still vulnerable.

Through the tentacles, Lady Octopus can interface with appropriately equipped computer systems and enter virtual reality interfaces telepathically. Additionally, Lady Octopus possesses a genius-level intellect; having studied robotics, information technology, applied physics, and mechanical engineering.

== Reception ==
- In 2020, CBR.com ranked Lady Octopus 8th in their "10 Most Powerful Members of the Sinister Syndicate" list.
- In 2021, Screen Rant included Lady Octopus in their "Spider-Man: 10 Best Female Villains" list.

== Other versions ==
=== Heroes Reborn (2021) ===
An alternate universe version of Carolyn Trainer appears in "Heroes Reborn". This version is a classmate of Peter Parker.

=== MC2 ===
An alternate future version of Carolyn Trainer appears in the MC2 series Spider-Girl. This version works for Black Tarantula.

== In other media ==
=== Television ===
- Lady Octopus appears in the Spider-Man (2017) episode "Between an Ock and a Hard Place", voiced by Kari Wahlgren. This version has a PhD in electronics.
- A female incarnation of Doctor Octopus loosely based on Carolyn Trainer appears in Spidey and His Amazing Friends, voiced by Kelly Ohanian.

=== Film ===
A character loosely based on Lady Octopus named Dr. Olivia "Liv" Octavius appears in Spider-Man: Into the Spider-Verse and Spider-Man: Across the Spider-Verse, voiced by Kathryn Hahn.

=== Video games ===
- Serena Patel, an original character inspired by Carolyn Trainer, appears as a boss in Spider-Man: Shattered Dimensions, voiced by Tara Strong. She is the head scientist of Alchemax's Shadow Division in the year 2099, which is dedicated to the secretive creation of dangerous super-weapons and DNA splicing-based experiments. Patel later creates a battle suit with mechanical arms and calls herself "Doctor Octopus" after her idol Otto Octavius. Upon obtaining a fragment of the Tablet of Order and Chaos, she attempts to use it as a power source but is defeated by Spider-Man 2099.
- Lady Octopus appears in a teaser image for Marvel: Avengers Alliance as a victim of the Circle of Eight.

=== Miscellaneous ===
Lady Octopus appears in Marvel Battleworld: Treachery at Twilight.
