= Aunt May =

Marvel Comics fictional character

- Art by Joe Quinones

Publication information
- Publisher: Marvel Comics
- First appearance: As Aunt May: Strange Tales #97 (January 1962); As May Parker: Amazing Fantasy #15 (August 1962)
- Created by: Stan Lee (writer); Steve Ditko (artist); Maxxis Hunter (writer)

In-story information
- Full name: Maybelle Jewel Parker-Jameson
- Place of origin: Brooklyn, New York
- Supporting character of: Spider-Man
- Notable aliases: Aunt May, May Reilly, May Fitzgerald, Golden Oldie, May Morgan

Maybelle Jewel "May" Parker-Jameson (née Reilly), commonly known as Aunt May, is a fictional character appearing in American comic books published by Marvel Comics, frequently in association with the superhero Spider-Man. Making her first full appearance in Amazing Fantasy #15 (August 1962), the character was created by writer Stan Lee and artist Steve Ditko, and went on to play an influential role in the Spider-Man comic books.

May is the widow of Ben Parker and the paternal aunt by marriage of Peter Parker, who leads a secret life as Spider-Man. She is a supportive mother figure to Peter, although throughout most of Spider-Man's history, she has not known of his secret life and considered Spider-Man frightening. In modern renditions, May has been known to support the hero, and in rare cases suspects or knows his true identity. Later in life, she marries J. Jonah "Jay" Jameson Sr., the estranged father of Peter's boss and Spider-Man's harshest critic J. Jonah Jameson, making him her step-son and by extension Peter's step-cousin (and self-declared step-brother), much to Jameson's discomfort.

Since May's conception, the character has appeared in several media adaptations of Spider-Man, often playing a supporting role. May was portrayed by Rosemary Harris in Sam Raimi's Spider-Man trilogy, Sally Field in Marc Webb's The Amazing Spider-Man duology and Marisa Tomei in the Marvel Cinematic Universe (MCU) films. In the Spider-Verse franchise, the character was voiced by Lily Tomlin in Into the Spider-Verse and Elizabeth Perkins in Across the Spider-Verse.

== Fictional character biography ==
May Parker was born in Brooklyn, New York on May 5. After the death of her brother-in-law and his wife, May and her husband Ben Parker took in their only nephew, Peter, and raised him at their home at 20 Ingram Street, Forest Hills, Queens. She remained an important influence in Peter's life even during college as she was the only family he had left. Her continued belief that Peter was still the fragile boy he had been before he gained his powers could be frustrating for him at times.

In the early years of his superhero career, Peter feared for May's well-being and worried shock could end her life if she ever learned of his dual identity as Spider-Man. Consequently, Peter often felt anguish over dealing with major crises while his aunt needed nearly constant care. This conflict took on an unusual turn when May became sweethearts with his enemy, Otto Octavius (also known as Doctor Octopus), and Peter struggled to deal with his enemy's schemes while not hurting his aunt.

During a period of convalescence at a nursing home, May met wheelchair user Nathan Lubensky. Gradually, May and Nathan fell in love. She invited Nathan into her Forest Hills home after converting it into a boarding house, and the couple was briefly engaged. However, May's heart was broken when Nathan suffered a fatal heart attack while protecting her from being taken hostage by Adrian Toomes, the costumed villain known as the Vulture. Some time thereafter, a guilt-stricken Toomes confronted May, begging her to forgive him for his role in Nathan's death. (Ironically, Nathan had befriended Toomes when the two briefly resided at the same nursing home). May refused to do so, stating that only God could provide the villain with the redemption he was seeking.

As part of a plan by Peter's arch-foe Norman Osborn, May was replaced by a "genetically altered actress" who impersonated her while May was held captive by villains until the actress died, Osborn returning May to Peter with a device planted inside her that would detonate a series of gene bombs if removed, decimating Earth. Mister Fantastic was able to disable the device without removing it, saving the world and May, who apparently retained no memory of her time in captivity. May finally learned about her nephew's secret life when she walked into his room after he had sustained a serious beating from the villain Morlun, the two later talking about May's discovery as May came to accept her nephew's real life.

When Spider-Man joins the Avengers, Peter, Aunt May, and Mary Jane Watson move into Stark Tower after May loses her house to a fire. During the Superhero Civil War, she and Mary Jane convince Peter to unmask himself in front of a press conference. Later, she is targeted by the Chameleon, but outwits him by feeding him cookies filled with Ambien.

When Peter changes his mind about the Superhuman Registration Act, he moves his family from Stark Tower to a motel. An assassin hired by Kingpin tries to kill Peter, but hits May instead. Peter takes May to a hospital where she lapses into a coma and is likely to die. However, Aunt May receives a radioactive blood transfusion from Peter, which he hoped would save her life due to his mutated healing factor.

The demon Mephisto offers to restore May's health in exchange for erasing Peter's marriage from history, and Peter and Mary Jane agree. May lives, and Spider-Man's identity is once again a secret.

At the beginning of Brand New Day, May is doing volunteer work for a homeless shelter named FEAST, run by Martin Li, the supervillain crime boss Mister Negative. At this point, her knowledge of Peter being Spider-Man was erased. During her work at the shelter, she met John Jonah "Jay" Jameson (the father of J. Jonah Jameson) and started a relationship with him. The following issue, Peter caught the two of them in bed. However, he approved of this relationship, mainly because Jay supports Spider-Man, who had previously saved his life, and saw through Norman Osborn as a thug who holds nothing but contempt for the people.

Jay walked with May in Central Park and asked her to marry him, and May accepted. Despite Doctor Octopus' subconscious efforts to halt his former fiancé's wedding plans, May and Jay were reluctantly wedded by New York Mayor J. Jonah Jameson, who expressed displeasure at Peter calling them stepbrothers (due to May being his adoptive mother).

Upon her return from her honeymoon, she stops by the FEAST offices, only to accidentally walk in on Martin Li, along with Hammerhead, torturing one of Mr. Negative's Inner Demons. Trying to escape, Li touches her with his corrupting touch. She then returns to meet her husband and Peter. When Jay suggests going somewhere nice for dinner, Aunt May sarcastically proceeds to insult Peter over his fluctuating jobs and his dependence on them, culminating with calling her nephew "One damn big disappointment". A heartbroken Peter runs off. Peter returns, after a physically and mentally exhausting battle against the Lizard, tries talking to Aunt May, looking for someone to help give him hope after seeing the death of Curt Connors' humanity. She continues to be bad-tempered and at first, rebuffs him. However, after seeing Peter suffering mentally, she feels guilty and undergoes an intense mind battle, breaking the corruption, and is shown simply sitting next to Peter.

Prior to the events of Spider-Island, after Martin Li's secret identity is exposed to the public, May and Jay formally announce their intention to leave New York for good, for their own safety, and move to Boston. Jay explains this was the result of all the recent major incidents towards them and their friends and family. They put May's old house up for sale and leave once the moving van is packed. After spending their last night in New York at Jay's apartment, the following day she and Jay head to an airport in New Jersey with Peter and Carlie and they say their goodbyes before flying off. Following the Ends of the Earth storyline, when May and Jay are returning home to New York on their private jet, the superhero Alpha uses his powers recklessly in his battle with Terminus, causing many aircraft to shut down. The Avengers rescue everybody and Spider-Man saves his May and Jay from Jameson's malfunctioning private jet just before it crashes. Later Peter arrives at the hospital to see that his Aunt May and Jay are okay, although she has sustained minor nerve damage to her leg that will require the use of a cane for the rest of her life. In The Superior Spider-Man storyline, Aunt May's leg is fully healed from operation and completion surgery with gratitude of Elias Wirtham.

As part of the All-New, All-Different Marvel, May and Jay became part of the Parker Industries foundation, a charity focused on providing help for the less fortunate. However, her husband Jay had coughed up blood and collapsed. Aunt May was heartbroken after Jay died in the hospital.

After Peter Parker had his doctorate revoked for "copying" Doctor Octopus' thesis and getting fired from the Daily Bugle, May confronted her nephew about his actions. While stating that he should take responsibility for his actions, May leaves stating that Uncle Ben should have raised him better.

Shortly afterwards, May was diagnosed with cancer. While she initially does not tell Peter to avoid overwhelming him, she eventually relents. Peter accompanies her to chemotherapy, and asks Stephen Strange if he can use his mystic powers to cure her, but he refuses. She decides to dedicate her remaining time to serving the homeless community, and reopens F.E.A.S.T. An operation to cure her is successful.

When Peter is a coma due to his exposure to poison gas and radiation in a fight with the U-Foes, May enlists Otto Octavius to help her find a cure. Together, they track down the U-Foes and obtain samples from them. Octavius breaks down the components of the gas, allowing doctors to cure Peter.

After taking care of a homeless Ned Leeds, May decides to reopen F.E.A.S.T., where she eventually meets a elderly charity worker named Ric Bernal and moves in with him. When Peter is sent into space by the powerful villain Hellgate, his clone, Ben Reilly, takes over his personal life and cuts off communication with May. Peter returns and attempts to mend his relationship with her, though Ric remains distrustful of him.

She and other relatives of the Parker family are targeted by the serial killer Torment in the "Death Spiral" storyline. During the attacks, a businessman named Cormac "Mac" Crane is targeted and Torment claims he and Spider-Man are cousins. Crane gets a blood test and discovers that he is May and Ben's son. May confirms that she and Ben attempted to have a child when they were younger and were told the baby was a stillborn, but he was taken away and adopted by a different family.

Mac is revealed to be a supervillain named Ravage and has the ability to absorb and manipulate memories. He uses his powers to make May completely forget Peter's existence. He attempts to kill Peter to establish himself as May's true son, but Spider-Man defeats him and blackmails him into letting May go by threatening to reveal his secret, giving Peter the chance to rebuild their relationship and try to find a way to restore her memories.

== Other versions ==
=== Earth-24122 ===
On Earth-24122, an alternate version of Aunt May operated as Madame Web. Following Uncle Ben's death and her nephew operating as Spider-Man, she approached Norman Osborn to gain omniscience powers. When that was done, Madame Web formed the Sinister Squadron and targeted the Spider-Society. She was apparently killed when the Gwen Stacy version of Green Goblin turned against her and threw them both into the Web of Life and Destiny.

=== Golden Oldie ===
May Parker was transformed by Galactus into the cosmically powered being Golden Oldie to serve as his herald. Rather than lead him to populated worlds, Oldie discovered an extraterrestrial baker who bakes planet-sized snack cakes that sate Galactus's hunger. May's transformation is ultimately revealed as a dream. The issue, a parody of an old Hostess snack cake advertising campaign, was part of Marvel's "Assistant Editors Month" series of humorous issues.

May also appeared as "Golden Oldie" (this time an Iron Man parody) as well as "The Astonishing Aunt Ant" and "Auntie Freeze" in an issue of What If?.

=== Marvel Noir ===
In the Marvel Noir reality, Aunt May is depicted as a political activist and social reformer.

=== MC2 ===
In the alternate timeline known as MC2, May Parker's death in The Amazing Spider-Man #400 was valid. It was May who died in this continuum, rather than an actress. Peter's daughter, May "Mayday" Parker, was named for her. Mayday became the super-heroine Spider-Girl and met the original May when she found herself displaced in time, although Mayday makes no attempt to explain who she really was.

In the final arc of Amazing Spider-Girl, Aunt May acts a spiritual advisor to May to help her grandniece reclaim her identity and save Peter from Norman Osborn. In this form, she initially appears as a younger version of herself, which prevents May from recognizing her. However, May finally figures it out when she sees Aunt May through her father's eyes.

=== Spider-Man: Life Story ===
In this continuity, the characters age naturally after Peter Parker became Spider-Man in 1962. Sometime before 1977, May married Otto Octavius, but she later divorced him due to his anger management problems. In the 1980s, Mary Jane struggles to take care of May as she shows early signs of dementia around the time Mary Jane and Peter's twins are born. It puts a further rift in Peter and Mary Jane's marriage as Peter refuses to put her in a senior's home while Mary Jane is sick of being the sole caretaker of May and their children. Mary Jane later leaves Peter and takes the twins with her as Peter looks after May. May later dies sometime before 1995.

=== Spider-Verse ===
During the "Spider-Verse" storyline, several alternate versions of Aunt May that are featured:

- An alternate Aunt May from Earth-14512 appears in a flashback along with her version of Uncle Ben. They are depicted as scientists and the ones who informed Peni Parker that she was the only person able to carry on the SP//dr project after her father, the original pilot, died in battle. Peni accepted the responsibility, allowing the radioactive spider that formed the other half of SP//dr's CPU to bite her. When Addy Brock lost control of VEN#m, May flew in to the mech to manually shut it down, only to be consumed by it. After SP//dr defeats VEN#m, she finds Addy and May gone.
- In an unknown reality, Aunt May and Uncle Ben are with their nephew Peter at the hospital after he suffers an allergic reaction to the radioactive spider bite, leaving him in a coma. Because of this, they are out of their house when it is burgled by the thief that killed Ben in the 616 universe. Peter transforms into Man-Spider and attacks May and Ben, but gets stopped by Spider-Man Noir. Six-Armed Spider-Man creates a cure for this Peter, allowing him to live a normal life with May and Ben.
- On Earth-803, May Reilly is a young woman living in a 19th-century steampunk-inspired New York. Her father studied animals, and one day when she let a spider out of its cage to get it comfort and to pet it, she got bit and learned that it was important not to let anyone cage her. After her father died, she used spare parts to create a suit with four mechanical arms that allowed her to climb walls as well as web shooters. While attending a ball, the mayor was kidnapped by the Six Men of Sinestry, so she stepped in to stop them; making her debut as Lady Spider. Though the villains manage to get the mayor's plans, she defeats them and forces them to retreat. Following this, she is recruited into the Spider-Army. The Inheritors attacked them, separating her from the rest, though she accompanied Spider-Man 2099 to his dimension to fend off the Inheritor Daemos. They then traveled to Earth-13 before going back to her dimension to fix the Japanese Spider-Man's Leopardon before they piloted it into battle against the Inheritors in Loomworld.
- Earth-11's May Parker is the aunt of Penelope Parker, who told her about the spider bite she received during an accident at Osborn Labs, how she developed spider-like abilities, and how she wanted to hide her powers so people would think she was normal. However, Aunt May convinced her niece being normal was overrated and that she should embrace what happened to her to help people.
- On Earth-3123, Aunt May is known as Spider-Ma'am. She ended up getting bitten by the radioactive spider instead of Peter as she showed up to the science demonstration to give Peter his lunch. After revealing her identity to Ben and Peter, Peter develops web shooters and the two help May with her heroic activities on the sidelines. During the events of Spider-Verse, she and her family were confronted by Karn of the Inheritors. Sensing that he was too strong for her, she proposed to offer her life for the sake of her family, causing Karn to temporarily hesitate as she reminded him of his mother. He nearly killed her, but several multiversal Spider-Men intervened and convinced him to join them. During the "Spider-Geddon" storyline, Spider-Ma'am joined the fight against the Inheritors. When the villains are defeated, Superior Spider-Man cloned them as babies. After talking with her husband, Spider-Ma'am agreed to take them in as foster children.

=== Spider-Geddon ===
During the "Spider-Geddon" storyline, an unidentified Earth has a Hispanic version of May who is unaware that her husband and nephew have spider powers after a blood transfusion saved Uncle Ben's life.

=== Amazing Spider-Man: Renew Your Vows ===
In this Secret Wars Warzone, when Peter is captured by Regent and his life is flashing before his eyes, one of his memories was him standing in front of Aunt May's open casket at her funeral, confirming that she died sometime before the events of the comic.

=== Ultimate Marvel ===
In the Ultimate Marvel universe Aunt May is based on writer Brian Michael Bendis' mother. This version of the character is a strong and independent woman in her late forties or early fifties, significantly younger than her original Marvel Universe counterpart. She is the biological sister of Mary Parker, and wife to Ben Parker.

Peter reveals his secret identity to May after he finds Gwen Stacy's clone at her old house, resulting in May evicting Peter from her home, as she despises Spider-Man. This coincides with the appearance of a man who appears to be Richard Parker, Peter's father. Peter learns that May had known this man, actually an artificially-aged clone of Peter, and she kept this secret from Peter to "protect him". After a long talk between Peter and his "father", Nick Fury and a team of Spider Slayers surround the Parker home, which triggers a transformation in Gwen, turning her into Carnage. May then suffers a heart attack. She is rescued from dying by Sue Storm of the Fantastic Four, reconciles with Peter and accepts his life as Spider-Man, though she is not at all fond of his costume. Peter later explains to May why he became Spider-Man, and May tells him that Ben would be proud of him for doing so.

== In other media ==
=== Television ===
- May Parker appears in Spider-Man (1967), voiced by Peg Dixon.
- May Parker appears in Spider-Man (1977) and its follow-up television series The Amazing Spider-Man (1978), portrayed by Jeff Donnell and Irene Tedrow respectively.
- May Parker appears in Spider-Man (1981), voiced by Morgan Lofting.
- May Parker appears in Spider-Man and His Amazing Friends, voiced by June Foray. This version's house serves as the Spider-Friends' headquarters, though she remains unaware of their activities.
- May Parker appears in Spider-Man: The Animated Series, voiced by Linda Gary in the first three seasons and Julie Bennett in the final two seasons. This version displays a strong dislike of Spider-Man, but loves Peter Parker dearly. Additionally, she is friends with Keane Marlowe and Anna Watson, despite the latter's lack of respect for Peter, and goes on to give her and her husband Ben's wedding rings to Peter and Mary Jane Watson.
- May Parker appears in The Spectacular Spider-Man, voiced by Deborah Strang. In the first season, she suffers a heart attack while seeing a show on Broadway with her friend Anna Watson amidst Spider-Man's first fight with the Sinister Six. Due to the Venom symbiote's influence, Peter remains unaware of what happened until Mary Jane Watson tells him May was hospitalized. By the season finale, May is released and has Thanksgiving dinner with Peter, her physician Nicholas Bromwell, and Captain George and Gwen Stacy. In the second season, May has fully recovered, though Peter remains concerned for her, and has taken a mutual liking to Bromwell.
- May Parker appears in Ultimate Spider-Man, voiced by Misty Lee. This version is in her late 40s and is less fragile than traditional depictions. Additionally, she is involved in various hobbies such as yoga and cooking classes. In the third season, May reveals that she knew Peter Parker's secret identity as Spider-Man and assures him of her pride in him. In the fourth season, May helps reform the Scarlet Spider and suggests naming him Ben.
  - An alternate reality version of May from Miles Morales' universe appears in the episode "Return to the Spider-Verse" Pt. 4, also voiced by Misty Lee. After Morales is stranded in Peter's universe, she helps Spider-Woman fight crime.
- May Parker appears in Marvel's Spider-Man (2017), voiced by Nancy Linari. This version is younger than traditional depictions.
- May Parker appears in Spidey and His Amazing Friends, voiced by Melanie Minichino.

=== Film ===
- May Parker appears in Sam Raimi's Spider-Man trilogy, portrayed by Rosemary Harris. This version is a housewife who encourages Peter Parker with words of wisdom like her husband Ben Parker had before his death.
- May Parker appears in The Amazing Spider-Man and The Amazing Spider-Man 2, portrayed by Sally Field. This version is slightly younger than previous depictions. Additionally, in the latter film, she has become a nursing student to support herself and her nephew Peter Parker financially after he graduates from high school.
- May Parker appears in Spider-Man: Into the Spider-Verse, voiced by Lily Tomlin. After her nephew Peter Parker dies, she ends up housing "Spider-People" from across the multiverse and gives them access to her Peter's underground hideout. She later assists Miles Morales in creating his own Spider-Man suit and provides him with modified versions of Peter's web shooters.
- Alternate universe versions of May Parker, such as one from Earth-65 and Lady Spider, make minor appearances in Spider-Man: Across the Spider-Verse, with the former voiced by Elizabeth Perkins while the latter has no dialogue.

=== Marvel Cinematic Universe ===
May Parker appears in media set in the Marvel Cinematic Universe (MCU), portrayed by Marisa Tomei. This version is much younger than previous depictions and is Italian American. She first appears in Captain America: Civil War (2016) before making subsequent appearances in Spider-Man: Homecoming (2017), Avengers: Endgame (2019), Spider-Man: Far From Home (2019), Spider-Man: No Way Home (2021), and Spider-Man: Brand New Day (2026).

In Homecoming, May remains oblivious of Peter's secret identity as Spider-Man until the end of the film. She continues to support Peter in his heroic activities in the following films, and also briefly dates Tony Stark's head of security, Happy Hogan. In No Way Home, she is fatally wounded by the Green Goblin and teaches Peter that with great power, there must also come great responsibility before dying. In Brand New Day, May appears in flashback sequences where she embraces Peter's superhero identity and comforts him. The same sequence is later viewed from Jean Grey's perspective when she enters Peter's mind, causing her to relent from her search for revenge on Bill Metzger.

Additionally, an alternate universe variant of May appears in Your Friendly Neighborhood Spider-Man, voiced by Kari Wahlgren.

=== Video games ===
- May Parker makes a cameo appearance in Marvel Super Heroes vs. Street Fighter.
- May Parker appears in the Spider-Man 2 film tie-in game, voiced by Mindy Sterling.
- May Parker appears in Lego Marvel Super Heroes, voiced by Kari Wahlgren.
- May appears in The Amazing Spider-Man 2 film tie-in game, voiced by Diane Michelle.
- May Parker's Spider-Ma'am and Lady Spider counterparts appear as playable characters in Spider-Man Unlimited, with the former voiced again by Misty Lee.
- May Parker appears as a playable character in Lego Marvel Super Heroes 2, with her Lady Spider counterpart appearing later as a DLC character.
- May Parker appears in Marvel's Spider-Man (2018), voiced again by Nancy Linari. This version volunteers at Martin Li's homeless assistance group F.E.A.S.T. and is later put in charge of one of its centers after Li turns into Mister Negative to seek revenge on Mayor Norman Osborn. After Otto Octavius releases the Devil's Breath virus on New York as part of his own plans to seek revenge on Osborn, May falls victim to it, but continues to help others until she is left bed-ridden. While her nephew Peter Parker procures an anti-serum, there is not enough to mass-produce it in time to save her and the rest of New York. Despite this, she urges him not to use it on her, admits she knew of his work as Spider-Man, and expresses how proud she is of him before dying. Following this, May is buried next to Ben Parker and a standing commemorative plaque is added to the F.E.A.S.T. center in her honor.
  - May Parker appears in a flashback depicted in Spider-Man 2, voiced again by Nancy Linari.
- May Parker makes a cameo appearance in the Amazing Guardians' story in Marvel Tokon: Fighting Souls.

=== Miscellaneous ===
May Parker appears in the novel What if... Wanda Maximoff and Peter Parker Were Siblings?.

== See also ==
- Spider-Man: Back in Black
- Spider-Man: One More Day
- Spider-Man: Brand New Day
- One Moment in Time (comics)
