= Sinister Six =

Comic book supervillains

- The original Sinister Six – Kraven the Hunter, Mysterio, Doctor Octopus, Vulture, Sandman, and Electro – battling Spider-Man. Art by Alex Ross.

Publication information
- Publisher: Marvel Comics
- First appearance: The Amazing Spider-Man Annual #1 (October 1964)
- Created by: Stan Lee; Steve Ditko

In-story information
- Base(s): New York City
- Member(s): List of Sinister Six members

The Sinister Six are a group of supervillains in American comic books published by Marvel Comics, mainly those featuring Spider-Man. The members are drawn from the character's list of enemies, with the original members forming the team in The Amazing Spider-Man Annual #1 (October 1964). Led by Doctor Octopus (introduced in issue #3), the team in its premiere followed swiftly the very early appearances of many of the most enduring members of Spider-Man's rogues gallery: the Vulture (issue #2), the Sandman (issue #4), Electro (issue #9), Mysterio (issue #13), and Kraven the Hunter (issue #15). While Doctor Octopus has generally remained its leader, the Sinister Six has had multiple variations of composition.

The team has been adapted into various forms of media, mainly in animated series and video games.

== Publication history ==
The Sinister Six first appeared in The Amazing Spider-Man Annual #1 (October 1964).

== Fictional team biography ==
=== Original Sinister Six ===
After suffering two defeats from Spider-Man, (Note: As seen in The Amazing Spider-Man #3 and 11-12.) Doctor Octopus is separated from his tentacle pack. After his tentacle pack breaks free and helps Doctor Octopus get out of prison, he contacts every known supervillain who had crossed paths with Spider-Man. Only Electro, Kraven the Hunter, Mysterio, Sandman, and Vulture respond. As none of the members are willing to relinquish the honor of killing Spider-Man themselves, they decide to challenge Spider-Man individually with the order in which they face him determined by a random drawing. The Sinister Six kidnap Aunt May and Daily Bugle secretary Betty Brant, holding them hostage in order to force Spider-Man to confront them. Spider-Man defeats the Sinister Six members one-by-one, mocking their decision to battle him individually instead of as a team in front of Doctor Octopus, the last one to be defeated.

=== "The Return of the Sinister Six" ===
In The Amazing Spider-Man #334–339, Doctor Octopus recruits Electro, Sandman, Mysterio, and Vulture, along with the demonic Jason Macendale version of Hobgoblin (since Kraven the Hunter had recently died), as part of his plan to take over the world. However, this was a trick, part of a larger plan by which Doctor Octopus alone would be the master of the world, by releasing a chemical into the atmosphere that would cause pain in anyone who attempted to use cocaine; he would then sell his cure for the chemical to the rich and powerful. Sandman, who at this point in his career had reformed and was blackmailed into joining, aids Spider-Man in defeating the Sinister Six, and ultimately stopping Doctor Octopus's plans to conquer the world. Because Doctor Octopus' chemical is eating away the ozone layer, Spider-Man has no choice but to release the cure into the atmosphere.

=== "Revenge of the Sinister Six" ===
In Spider-Man #18-23, Electro, Mysterio, Vulture, and Hobgoblin reunite in a bid to take revenge on Doctor Octopus. To trick Sandman into joining them, they hit his foster family with a bomb, leading him to believe Doctor Octopus attacked them as punishment for betraying him. Sandman contacts Spider-Man and asks him to shadow the group as insurance against him being double-crossed. Doctor Octopus easily defeats the other members of the six with his newly reacquired adamantium arms, then zaps Sandman with a weapon that transforms his body into glass and beats Spider-Man nearly to death. When police surround the building, the other members of the Sinister Six agree to serve Doctor Octopus in exchange for his helping them escape. The assembled Sinister Six go off on a rampage, stealing advanced weapons and technology from several sources, including an alien dimension and a facility specializing in cybernetics. To again complete their quorum of six, they recruit Gog. Eventually, Spider-Man and several other heroes (including Ghost Rider, Deathlok, Nova, Hulk, and Solo) confront the villains as they are seizing a Hydra base to gain access to deadly, world-devastating weapons. Most of the members are again incarcerated, but Vulture and Hobgoblin escape.

=== Sinister Seven ===
A variation known as the Sinister Seven is formed by Hobgoblin to fight Kaine after he killed Doctor Octopus and the Grim Hunter (Kraven the Hunter's son Vladimir). Hobgoblin's Sinister Seven includes Beetle, Electro, Mysterio, Scorpia, Shocker, and Vulture. They finally find Kaine and a battle erupts. Spider-Man saves Kaine from being executed; the two then work together and defeat the Sinister Seven.

=== Sandman's Sinister Six ===
Eventually, the Sandman (who had been turned back into a villain by his former ally Wizard) and the second Mysterio (the original had committed suicide following his fight with Daredevil) form a new version of the Sinister Six, with Venom temporarily replacing Doctor Octopus and the other members consisting of Electro, the second Kraven the Hunter (another son of the dead original), and Vulture. The Sandman uses the Sinister Six in order to get revenge on Doctor Octopus for turning him into glass in "The Revenge of the Sinister Six" storyline. The Sinister Six are defeated again, and Venom subsequently attacks the various members of the group after being betrayed by them. He nearly kills the Sandman and badly injures Electro and Kraven the Hunter before he and his symbiote are briefly separated from each other by the mysterious Senator Ward.

=== Sinister Twelve ===
The Sinister Twelve

In Marvel Knights Spider-Man, Norman Osborn is unmasked to the public as the Green Goblin and imprisoned. Osborn contacts a group of supervillains who also bear grudges against Spider-Man, all of whom had been financed by Osborn's fortunes for years. Eager to retaliate, the villains agree to band together, and the Sinister Twelve is formed.

Mac Gargan is the de facto leader of the Twelve while Osborn is in prison, and he kidnaps Peter Parker's Aunt May and threatens to kill her if Spider-Man does not help Osborn escape from jail. Spider-Man, with help from Black Cat, breaks Osborn out only to be confronted by Vulture, Sandman, Electro, Chameleon, Lizard, Hydro-Man, Shocker, Hammerhead, Boomerang, and Tombstone. Osborn, now in the guise of the Goblin, introduces them as the Sinister Twelve.

Spider-Man and Black Cat are rescued by Captain America, Iron Man, Daredevil, Yellowjacket and the Fantastic Four. Furious, Goblin rockets away and kidnaps Mary Jane Watson and Spider-Man pursues him. Spider-Man and the Goblin clash upon a bridge (not the one where Gwen Stacy was killed). Finally, Osborn gives a vital clue as to Aunt May's whereabouts before being knocked into the river below. In the aftermath, Aunt May is found and saved. The rest of the Sinister Twelve are subdued by the other heroes and arrested.

=== Civil War's Sinister Six ===
A new version of the Sinister Six apparently bands together during the Civil War storyline. The line-up consists of Doctor Octopus, Grim Reaper, Lizard, Shocker, Trapster, and Vulture. They are stopped by Captain America and his Secret Avengers off-panel and discovered bound and subdued by S.H.I.E.L.D.

=== "Big Time" Sinister Six ===
Following the events of the "Origin of the Species" storyline which involves Doctor Octopus assembling Spider-Man's enemies into targeting Harry Osborn's baby (who Doctor Octopus thought had some of Norman Osborn's DNA), only Chameleon, Electro, Mysterio, Rhino, and the Sandman remain with Doctor Octopus to reform the Sinister Six when the baby does not inherit Norman Osborn's DNA. Their first plot involves sending Micro-Octobots to blow up an Air Force base. This is prevented by Spider-Man, the Avengers, and the Fantastic Four.

Spider-Man and the Future Foundation stumble on a plot on a Caribbean Island by the Sinister Six which involves the use of a zombie pirate crew. During the fight with the Sinister Six, Spider-Man realizes that the Doctor Octopus, Electro, Rhino, and Sandman that they are fighting are robots, while Mysterio and the Chameleon are the only real ones present. Meanwhile, the real Doctor Octopus infiltrates the Baxter Building to look for specific technology plans.

While the adult Avengers are dealing with the eruption of Mount Etna, Tigra and the Avengers Academy students learn that Electro has broken into a French laboratory. Once on the scene, the students discover that Electro is accompanied by the rest of the Sinister Six. The Sinister Six overpower the students and Doctor Octopus steals a device containing self-sustaining power.

Doctor Octopus and Mysterio coordinate the Octobots who have infiltrated the Apogee 1 Space Station and taken over some of the crew members. When Mysterio notices that some of the Octobots were disabled, Doctor Octopus orders the Octobots to finish their mission and then destroy the space station. When Spider-Man arrives on the Apogee 1 Space Station, Doctor Octopus pushes a button that starts to move the Apogee 1 Space Station close to Earth. After Apogee 1 Space Station is destroyed and the crew is evacuated by Spider-Man, the Human Torch and John Jameson, Doctor Octopus tells the rest of the Sinister Six that his master plan is about to begin.

==== Ends of the Earth ====
In the "Ends of the Earth" storyline, all of Doctor Octopus' preparations come to fruition in a plan to conquer the world. Doctor Octopus activates a giant antenna array called the Octahedral which, in turn, activates Earth-orbiting satellites he calls the Octavian Lens. The Lens works to speed up the greenhouse effect, which in turn heats up the Earth. At Palazzo Senatorio, an international gathering of world leaders and the planet's greatest minds meet to discuss Doctor Octopus's supposed offer to save the world. The Avengers crash the assembly and Spider-Man captures the Chameleon, who is at the meeting disguised as Vice President Al Gore. Spider-Man lets Chameleon go, but he secretly places a Spider-Tracer on him, which allows Spider-Man and the Avengers to follow the Chameleon to the Mediterranean Coast where the rest of the Sinister Six is waiting. The Six subdue the Avengers, leaving only Spider-Man standing. Spider-Man is taken down when trying to gain control of Doctor Octopus's tentacles with his helmet.

Doctor Octopus demands control of 200 missile facilities, as well as two billion dollars for each of the members of the Sinister Six. After Spider-Man, Black Widow, and Silver Sable enter the facility and defeat the Sandman, Doctor Octopus contacts the United Nations and orders them to kill Spider-Man in retaliation. In a subsequent missile facility raid, Spider-Man and his allies manage to defeat the Rhino, but they are unable to capture him after being attacked by S.H.I.E.L.D. Forced to flee, Spider-Man and his allies then attempt to rally support from Earth's other heroes after Titanium Man alerts them to the fact that Doctor Octopus has been recruiting other villains. Tracking down a final facility, Spider-Man learns that Doctor Octopus has already launched all of his satellites. However, this is revealed to be a deception created by Mysterio and the Chameleon. Spider-Man defeats the Chameleon when he attempts to attack them in a "Doc-Ock" suit of armor. Spider-Man and his allies then convince Mysterio to help them track down Doctor Octopus's base. While they find the base, they also find themselves pitted against the 'new' Sinister Six—in the form of the mind-controlled Avengers. Despite Doctor Octopus's confidence, the heroes prevail against their mind-controlled teammates.

Mysterio uses an EMP generator to negate the Octobots controlling Thor, Iron Man and Red Hulk. The three set out to take out Doctor Octopus's missiles, while Spider-Man and Silver Sable confront Doctor Octopus in his base. The two are first met by the Rhino, who decides to drown himself and take Sable with him in an attempt to psychologically beat Spider-Man into submission. Spider-Man musters his strength, manages to destroy Doctor Octopus's arms and equipment and ultimately hauls his foe away to a doctor.

=== Marvel NOW!'s Sinister Six ===
As part of the Marvel NOW! event, the Superior Spider-Man (Doctor Octopus's mind in Spider-Man's body) encounters a new Sinister Six consisting of Boomerang, Overdrive, Shocker, Speed Demon, Living Brain, and the female Beetle who previously fought Captain America and the Black Widow. The group of villains attacks Horizon Labs, but the Superior Spider-Man defeats them, using a power-dampening field to disable their equipment. He is preparing to kill Boomerang when the still-living consciousness of Peter Parker stops him. Otto gives the villains to the NYPD and the EMTs upon their arrival.

This version of the Sinister Six (minus the Living Brain) then appears in its own series The Superior Foes of Spider-Man. The Sinister Six later assaulted the Owl's base. Overdrive and the Speed Demon were captured by the Owl and interrogated. The Beetle tried to blackmail the Owl into releasing them while covertly dialing for back-up. Unimpressed, the Owl got ready to execute her when reinforcements arrived in the form of Tombstone (who was revealed to be the Beetle's father). At one point to steal valuables from the Chameleon, including a portrait of Doctor Doom, the Sinister Six allied with the Owl, where they expand the group into a "Sinister Sixteen". Besides Boomerang, the Beetle, Overdrive, Owl, and Speed Demon, the group consists of Armadillo, Bi-Beast, Clown, Cyclone, Human Fly, Kangaroo, Man Mountain Marko, Mirage, Scorcher, Shriek, Spot, and Squid.

==== Superior Six ====
Following the deletion of Peter Parker's memories and acquiring the Raft as his new base, the Superior Spider-Man captures former Sinister Six members - Sandman, Electro, Chameleon, Mysterio, and Vulture - with the implied intention to create a new team as the Superior Spider-Man.

The Superior Spider-Man debuts with mind-controlled members as the supposedly-reformed "Superior Six" while Lightmaster is invading Alchemax to obtain an invention that would work in sync with his own light powers. The Superior Six ended up fighting the Wrecking Crew (who were hired by Lightmaster to assist him). Due to Sun Girl's widespread attack, the Superior Spider-Man lost control of the Superior Six.

==== Sinister Sixty-Six ====
Mojo and the Chameleon abduct Spider-Man and his X-Men students and force them to star in a show which pits them against the Sinister Sixty-Six. The group, which is not seen in its entirety, consists of holographic stand-ins of various enemies of Spider-Man: Beetle, Carnage, Demogoblin, Doctor Octopus, Duster, Electro, Gibbon, Green Goblin, Grizzly, Hammerhead, Hobgoblin, Jackal, Jack O'Lantern, Kingpin, Kraven the Hunter, Lizard, Morbius the Living Vampire, Mysterio, Puma, Rhino, Ringer, Sandman, Scorpion, Shocker, Shriek, Sludge, Tombstone, Vermin, and Vulture.

==== Swarm's Sinister Six ====
Spider-Man and the students of the Jean Grey School for Higher Learning encounter the eighth incarnation of the Sinister Six led by Swarm and consisting of 8-Ball, Delilah, Killer Shrike, the third Melter, and Squid. After Hellion defeats Swarm, the other members of the Sinister Six surrender.

=== Iron Spider's Sinister Six ===
Purchasing a recolored and modified version of the Iron Spider armor, Miles Morales' uncle Aaron Davis forms an incarnation of the Sinister Six consisting of Bombshell, the Francine Frye version of Electro, the Roderick Kingsley version of the Hobgoblin, Sandman, and Spot. Their first mission was to steal a decommissioned S.H.I.E.L.D. Helicarrier.

=== Sinister Sixty ===
Spider-Man plays with a cancer patient named Nathan where they envision that Nathan becomes Spider-Bite and they "fight" the Stilt-Man's Sinister Sixty who wish to obtain Spider-Bite's action figure of Spider-Man. The line-up consists of Absorbing Man, Big Man, Black Cat, Black Tarantula, Boomerang, Calypso, Carrion, Carnage, the Chameleon, Demogoblin, Doctor Octopus, Doppelganger, Electro, Enforcers, Fusion, Green Goblin, Grey Goblin, Hammerhead, Hobgoblin, Hydro-Man, Jack O'Lantern, Jackal, Joystick, Juggernaut, Kaine, the Kingpin, Kraven the Hunter, Kraven the Hunter (Alyosha Kravinoff), Kraven the Hunter (Ava Kravinoff), Lady Octopus, Lizard, Mephisto, Mister Negative, Molten Man, Morbius the Living Vampire, Morlun, Mysterio, Raptor, Rhino, Sandman, Sasha Kravinoff, Scorpia, Scorpion, Scream, Screwball, Shocker, Shriek, Silvermane, Sin-Eater, Alistair Smythe, Stunner, Swarm, Tarantula, Venom, Vermin, and Vulture. Spider-Man and Spider-Bite defeat the Sinister Sixty at Grand Central Station and keep the Stilt-Man from claiming the Spider-Man action figure.

=== Sinister War ===
In a lead-up to "Sinister War", Kindred tells Doctor Octopus that he can help him with his missing memories, but he will need to gather five more people. Upon building a special machine, Doctor Octopus resurrects Electro with his powers intact as Kindred comments on Electro's abilities while stating that Doctor Octopus is getting closer to his true self. Doctor Octopus and Electro find Kraven the Hunter in the Savage Land hunting a dinosaur. Electro shocks the dinosaur, and Doctor Octopus recruits Kraven into the Sinister Six. Doctor Octopus coerces Curt Connors into using the Isotope Genome Accelerator on himself, which splits his Lizard persona into a separate being. Kindred then completes the Sinister Six by having Mysterio join him.

=== Squid Kid's Sinister Six ===
A.I.M. operative and self-proclaimed Scientist Supreme Squid Kid formed a version of the Sinister Six consisting of Apostate, Mysteriant, Rhinoceress, Willow-Wisp, and an amnesiac Billy Connors, who became known as Lizard Boy. They targeted Stanley Osborn only to fight the students of Avengers Academy.

== Other versions ==
=== Age of Apocalypse ===
An alternate universe iteration of the Sinister Six appears in the "Age of Apocalypse" 10th anniversary limited series. This version of the group is assembled by Mister Sinister and consists of Cloak and Dagger, Sonique, Sauron, Blob, and Phoenix.

=== Avataars: Covenant of the Shield ===
A medieval fantasy-inspired iteration of the Sinister Six called the Six Most Sinister appear in Avataars: Covenant of the Shield #2, led by the Goblin King and consisting of the Huntsman, Jolt, Mysterium, Sandstorm, Talon, and Tentaclus. This version of the group operate a tollbooth in the Webwood.

=== Marvel 1602 ===
An alternate universe iteration of the Sinister Six from Earth-311 called the Sinister Sextet appears in The Amazing Spider-Man (vol. 4) #1, consisting of Canice Cassidy, Electro, Hobgoblin, Karnov, Magus, and the Serpent.

=== Marvel 2099 ===
A future iteration of the Sinister Six from a Marvel 2099-related timeline appears in Spider-Man 2099 (vol. 3) #11-12, consisting of Venom, the Goblin, Doctor Octopus, Vulture, Electro, and the Sandwoman. After the Goblin is revealed to be a mole helping Spider-Man 2099, he is killed by Doctor Octopus and replaced with Venture.

=== Marvel Zombies ===
- A zombified iteration of the Sinister Six make a minor appearance in Marvel Zombies: Dead Days, consisting of Doctor Octopus, the Green Goblin, the Vulture, the Sandman, Electro, and Mysterio.
- An alternate universe iteration of the Sinister Six appear in Marvel Zombies Return, consisting of Doctor Octopus, the Sandman, the Vulture, Mysterio, Electro, and Kraven the Hunter. This version of the group work for the Kingpin until all except the Sandman are attacked and converted by a dimension-hopping zombified Spider-Man.

=== Secret Wars (2015) ===
Three iterations of the Sinister Six from Battleworld appear in "Secret Wars" (2015).

- The first iteration appears in issue #2 of the Spider-Verse tie-in, consisting of Doctor Octopus, Kraven the Hunter, the Scorpion, Mysterio, the Shocker, and the Vulture. This version of the group hail from the Battleworld domain of Arachnia and work for Mayor Norman Osborn. Additionally, the fugitive Spider-Gwen, Spider-UK, Spider-Man Noir, Spider-Girl, Spider-Man India, and Spider-Ham are referred to by Osborn as the Sinister Six.
- The second iteration appears in Amazing Spider-Man: Renew Your Vows #2, consisting of Doctor Octopus, Kraven the Hunter, the Hobgoblin, Mysterio, the Shocker, and the Vulture. This version of the group hail from the Battleworld domain of the Regency, all wield advanced technology, and work for the Regent. Additionally, they are tasked with capturing naturally powered superhumans. After being tasked with capturing the recently resurfaced Spider-Man, Doctor Octopus is killed, the Hobgoblin is caught in an explosion, and the Vulture is incapacitated. In response, the Regent recruits the Beetle, Boomerang, and the Rhino to replace them, though the group is defeated by Spider-Man and the Avengers.

=== Spider's Shadow ===
An alternate universe iteration of the Sinister Six appear in the Spider-Man: Spider's Shadow miniseries, formed and led by J. Jonah Jameson / Spider-Slayer and consisting of Doctor Octopus, the Rhino, Electro, Mysterio, and Kraven the Hunter. This version of the group was formed in response to Peter Parker fully bonding to his symbiote suit and killing or assaulting his enemies. After Eddie Brock kills Octavius in an attempt to join the group, Parker grievously injures him and kills the Rhino, Electro, and Mysterio before a burning building forces the symbiote off of Parker. Realizing he was wrong about him, Jameson saves Parker while Kraven retreats.

=== Spider-Man: Reign ===
A possible future iteration of the Sinister Six called the "Sinner Six" appears in Spider-Man: Reign, consisting of the Scorpion, Electro, Mysterio, Kraven the Hunter, the Sandman, and Hydro-Man. This version of the group were forcibly recruited by New York's fascist mayor Mayor Waters via microchips implanted in their bodies that are rigged to detonate should they attempt to leave the city and tasked with killing Spider-Man in exchange for their freedom. Over the course of the series, Spider-Man defenestrates the Scorpion and kills Electro and Hydro-Man before subduing Kraven and Mysterio. While Spider-Man is confronting Waters, Sandman sacrifices himself to get the former the detonator.

=== Spider-Man Adventures ===
An alternate universe iteration of the Sinister Six appears in the Spider-Man Adventures magazine, formed by Doctor Doom and consisting of Doctor Octopus, the Vulture, Electro, the Rhino, the Sandman, and Eddie Brock / Venom.

=== Spider-Verse ===
A steampunk-themed iteration of the Sinister Six from Earth-803 called the Six Men of Sinestry appears in Spider-Verse #1 and the accompanying Spider-Man 2099 tie-in, led by the Green Goblin and consisting of Doctor Octopus, Electro, Kraven the Hunter, Mysterio, and the Vulture.

=== Spider-Ham ===
An alternate universe iteration of the Sinister Six called the Swinester Six from Earth-8311 appear in the Spider-Ham 25th Anniversary Special, consisting of the Green Gobbler, Doctor Octopuss, Sandmanatee, Eelectro, the Buzzard, and Mysteriape.

=== Ultimate Marvel ===
An alternate universe iteration of the Sinister Six from Earth-1610 called the Ultimate Six appears in the Ultimate Marvel imprint, initially consisting of the Sandman, Doctor Octopus, Kraven the Hunter, Electro, and the Green Goblin, with Spider-Man as a temporary member. This version of the group illegally altered their genetic codes, which led to them being defeated by Spider-Man and the Ultimates and incarcerated by S.H.I.E.L.D.

=== Ultimate Universe ===
An alternate universe iteration of the Sinister Six from Earth-6160 appears in Ultimate Spider-Man (vol. 3), led by Wilson Fisk and consisting of Mister Negative, Walter Hardy, Sergei Kravinoff, Mysterio, and Mole Man. This version of the group control New York's criminal underworld via its boroughs, with Fisk controlling Manhattan, Negative controlling Queens, Hardy controlling the Bronx, Kravinoff controlling Staten Island, Mysterio controlling Brooklyn, and Mole Man controlling New York's underground.

== In other media ==
=== Television ===
- The Sinister Six, renamed the Insidious Six, appear in Spider-Man: The Animated Series, assembled by Kingpin and consisting of Doctor Octopus, Mysterio, Shocker, Chameleon, Rhino, and Scorpion. The Insidious Six return in the five-part episode "Six Forgotten Warriors", with the Vulture replacing Mysterio, who died in a previous episode. They attempt to help the Kingpin unlock a doomsday machine, but the Chameleon betrays the group to help his foster father, the Red Skull. After the team is defeated again, it is disbanded for good.
- The Sinister Six appear in The Spectacular Spider-Man. Introduced in the episode "Group Therapy", Doctor Octopus, Sandman, Shocker, Vulture, Rhino, and Electro pool their resources together and organize a jail break, then go after Spider-Man, though they are defeated by his symbiote suit. In the episode "Reinforcement", Doctor Octopus arranges for the Sinister Six's reformation, with Kraven the Hunter and Mysterio replacing Shocker. The Sinister Six are again defeated by Spider-Man, though only Mysterio is arrested as the others escape. In the episode "Shear Strength", the remaining members help Doctor Octopus with his plan to take over the world by hacking into the FBI's servers, but Spider-Man thwarts them and captures Electro. In later episodes, Rhino, Vulture, and Doctor Octopus are captured, while Sandman fakes his death.
- The Sinister Six appear in Ultimate Spider-Man, initially consisting of Doctor Octopus, Electro, Kraven the Hunter, Rhino, Beetle, and a mind-controlled Lizard. In the episode "Return of the Sinister Six", Doctor Octopus reforms the team with Scorpion replacing Beetle and provides them all with high-tech armor made from stolen Oscorp technology, but they are defeated by Spider-Man and his team again, with help from Iron Patriot. Throughout the fourth season, Ultimate Spider-Man vs. the Sinister Six, Doctor Octopus secretly forms a Sinister Seven with help from Hydra. While Spider-Man and the Web Warriors defeat and capture supervillains to thin out Doctor Octopus's potential candidates, he goes on to recruit Kraven, Electro, a demonic Green Goblin from another universe, Hydro-Man, and a mind-controlled Rhino; with Scarlet Spider serving as a mole within Spider-Man's team. The Sinister Seven is defeated by Spider-Man and his allies in the episode "The New Sinister Six" after Scarlet Spider defects to the heroes' side, though Doctor Octopus escapes. In the two-part series finale, "Graduation Day", Doctor Octopus forms the Superior Sinister Six with Kraven, the Scorpion, and a mind-controlled Vulture, Rhino, and Crossbones mutated into a new Lizard to eliminate Spider-Man after learning his secret identity. Spider-Man defeats them once more, freeing the brainwashed villains from Doctor Octopus's control before persuading him to surrender.
- The Sinister Six appears in Spider-Man (2017). Introduced in the episode "The Rise of Doc Ock", they were originally the Osborn Commandos, a fighting force brought together by Norman Osborn and consisting of Doctor Octopus, Vulture, Rhino, Alistair Smythe, and Steel Spider. However, Doctor Octopus goes rogue and places the team under mind control, re-branding the team as the Sinister Five. In the episode "Hobgoblin", Doctor Octopus also places Spider-Man under mind control and has him join the team to make it the Sinister Six. However, Harry Osborn becomes the Hobgoblin and frees Spider-Man and the rest of the team from Doctor Octopus's control. All of the group's members are defeated and arrested by the end of the first season.

=== Film ===
==== Amazing Spider-Man series ====
In December 2013, Sony announced two spin-offs of The Amazing Spider-Man franchise, The Sinister Six and Venom, with Drew Goddard attached to write and direct the former. Throughout the live-action film The Amazing Spider-Man 2, a line-up for the team was teased. During the end credits, weapons and technology belonging to the Rhino, the Vulture, Doctor Octopus, Mysterio, and Kraven the Hunter were revealed, confirming them as members, with the Green Goblin serving as the leader. However, this line-up is left to be debated as Goddard stated he wanted to adopt a more classic adaptation of the group which would have included Sandman and Doctor Octopus as the leader. The film was said to be a redemption story for the characters, and would probably not feature Spider-Man. As the Sinister Six's original goal, however, was to kill him, there would seem to be a chance that he would appear. The film was originally scheduled for release on November 11, 2016. However, following the announcement in February 2015 of a new Spider-Man franchise with Marvel Studios, the spin-offs were postponed and eventually canceled.

==== Marvel Cinematic Universe ====
In an email from Amy Pascal leaked during the Sony Pictures hack, Pascal revealed that she planned for Tom Holland's Spider-Man to appear in a Sinister Six film set in the Marvel Cinematic Universe dependent on the success of the then-upcoming licensing agreement with Marvel Studios.

==== Sony's Spider-Man Universe ====
Following the collaboration between Marvel Studios and Sony Pictures, many spin-offs that had been in development before were revived, with the first of these, the live-action film Venom, being released on October 5, 2018. Sony's December 2013 plans for their own expanded universe included a film based on the Sinister Six, with Drew Goddard attached to write and potentially direct. Goddard was confirmed to be directing the film in April 2014. The film was believed to have been canceled by November 2015 when Sony was focusing on its new reboot with Marvel. In October 2018, Goddard acknowledged that his script could eventually be used for a film. By December of the same year, producer Amy Pascal confirmed that the studio intends to use the script in an upcoming project and expressed the company's desire for the filmmaker to direct the film as well.

In the post-credits scene of Morbius (2022), Adrian Toomes from the MCU approaches Dr. Michael Morbius in an effort to form a team. The team is intended to be the Sinister Six, with director Daniel Espinosa expressing interest in having Norman Osborn be part of the group.

Following the financial failures of Madame Web and Kraven the Hunter, and the underperformance of Venom: The Last Dance, it was announced that Sony would cease making spin-off films that did not feature Spider-Man, most likely including this film.

The Sinister Six are mentioned in the film Spider-Man: Across the Spider-Verse, when Miles finds himself on Earth-42, in a broadcast by Jameson due to there being no Spider-Man to fight them, run amok in New York as the "Sinister Six Cartel".

=== Video games ===
- The Sinister Six appear in Spider-Man: Return of the Sinister Six, consisting of Doctor Octopus, Electro, Sandman, Mysterio, the Vulture, and the Hobgoblin.
- The Sinister Six appear in Spider-Man 2: The Sinister Six, consisting of Doctor Octopus, Mysterio, Sandman, the Vulture, the Scorpion, and Kraven the Hunter.
- The Sinister Six appear in the MS-DOS game Spider-Man: The Sinister Six, consisting of Doctor Octopus, the Chameleon, Mysterio, the Hobgoblin, the Vulture, and the Shocker.
- A multiversal Sinister Six appear in Spider-Man Unlimited, consisting of several multiversal versions of the Green Goblin, the Vulture, Electro, Sandman, Doctor Octopus, and Mysterio. They came together to invade multiple dimensions and harvest iso-8 crystals, with an army of "Sinister Soldiers" aiding them in their conquest.
- The Sinister Six appear in Marvel: Avengers Alliance, consisting of Doctor Octopus, the Vulture, Mysterio, Kraven the Hunter, the Lizard, and Electro. They aim to capture a Spider-Man, many of whom have been gathering because of the threat of Karn of the Inheritors, and sacrifice them to Doctor Octopus' machine to hide their dimension from the threat of incursions.
- The Sinister Six appear in Lego Marvel Super Heroes, consisting of Doctor Octopus, Sandman, Mysterio, Kraven the Hunter, Electro, and Vulture.
- The Sinister Six appear in Marvel: Contest of Champions, consisting of Doctor Octopus, the Green Goblin, Venom, Electro, the Vulture, and the Rhino. They are hired by the Grandmaster to eliminate Spider-powered champions. The team re-appear in a promotional video, with Mysterio replacing Venom.
- The Sinister Six appear in Marvel: Future Fight, consisting of Mysterio disguised as Doctor Octopus, the Vulture, the Rhino, Kraven the Hunter, Sandman, and the Lizard.
- The Sinister Six appear in Marvel Strike Force, consisting of Doctor Octopus, the Green Goblin, the Rhino, Mysterio, the Shocker, and the Vulture. Additionally, Electro and Swarm appear as optional members.
- The Sinister Six appear in Marvel's Spider-Man, consisting of Doctor Octopus, Electro, the Rhino, the Scorpion, the Vulture, and Mister Negative. Everyone but Doctor Octopus were originally imprisoned at the Raft before the latter releases and recruits them in an attempt to exact revenge on his former business partner-turned-mayor, Norman Osborn. While he shares this goal with Mister Negative, he promises the others their greatest desires in exchange for their assistance. The group clashes with Spider-Man when he interferes, though they easily defeat him during their first fight. Following this, the Sinister Six split up to attack different Oscorp properties while Doctor Octopus secures the company's Devil's Breath virus and releases it in Times Square in an attempt to expose Norman's crimes, infecting numerous people and causing Manhattan to descend into chaos. After capturing the Vulture, Electro, the Rhino, and the Scorpion, Spider-Man defeats Mister Negative before he can steal the antidote for Devil's Breath, but Doctor Octopus escapes with it and Norman. Spider-Man is eventually able to save Norman, reclaim the antidote, and defeat Doctor Octopus. By the end of the game, the Sinister Six are re-captured and re-imprisoned at the Raft, although their mission was a partial success, as Norman resigns from the mayor's office out of shame.
- The Sinister Six appear in Marvel Ultimate Alliance 3: The Black Order, consisting of the Green Goblin, Doctor Octopus, Sandman, Mysterio, Electro, and Venom. The Goblin freed the other members from the Raft after obtaining the Time Stone and they took over the prison. After a team of heroes, including Spider-Man, arrive at the prison to secure the inmates, Venom defects to the heroes' side at Spider-Man's behest while the remaining Sinister Six members are defeated and imprisoned once more.

=== Miscellaneous ===
- The Sinister Six appear in Adam-Troy Castro's trilogy of Spider-Man novels, consisting of Doctor Octopus, the Vulture, Electro, Mysterio, the Chameleon, and an original character called Pity. This version of the group is formed by the Gentleman, who wishes to kill Peter Parker as revenge for the actions of his parents, Richard and Mary Parker, in the 1960s and cause a global financial collapse via an electromagnetic generator powered by Electro to erase all digital records and an ink-destroying catalyst to erase all paper records. The Vulture, Electro and Mysterio are defeated before the generator can be activated and Spider-Man convinces Pity to help him find the Gentleman when he realizes that Doctor Octopus will seek revenge on him for his arrogance, only to learn that the Chameleon had already killed the Gentleman for the same reason.
- The Sinister Six appear in Spider-Man: Turn Off the Dark, consisting of Electro, Carnage, Swarm, Kraven the Hunter, the Lizard, and an original character called Swiss Miss. This version of the group were all originally research scientists who were transformed by the Green Goblin as punishment for abandoning Osborn Industries and to destroy Spider-Man.
- The Sinister Six appear in Marvel Universe Live!, consisting of the Green Goblin, Doctor Octopus, the Rhino, the Lizard, Electro, and the Black Cat. They seek to claim a fragment of the recently shattered Cosmic Cube, only to be defeated by Spider-Man and Thor.
- The Sinister Six appear in the "Return of the Sinister Six" expansion pack for the Marvel United CMON Limited board game, consisting of Doctor Octopus, Electro, Kraven the Hunter, Mysterio, the Sandman, and the Vulture.

== See also ==
- Sinister Syndicate – A similar group of Spider-Man villains assembled by Beetle
- Savage Six – Two similar groups of villains assembled to fight Spider-Girl and Agent Venom
