= Venom vs. Carnage =

Comic book series by Peter Milligan

- Cover for Venom vs. Carnage #1 (September 2004). Art by Clayton Crain

Publication information
- Publisher: Marvel Comics
- Schedule: Monthly
- Format: Limited series
- Genre: Superhero
- Publication date: September – December 2004
- No. of issues: 4
- Main characters: Venom; Carnage; Toxin; Spider-Man; Black Cat

Creative team
- Written by: Peter Milligan
- Artist: Clayton Crain

Venom vs. Carnage is a comic book limited series written by Peter Milligan with art by Clayton Crain published by Marvel Comics. It has a total of four issues and has been reprinted in trade paperback form under the extended title of Spider-Man: Venom vs. Carnage. It features the first appearance of the Toxin symbiote.

Venom and Carnage are both symbiotes, Venom being attached and relying on his host, Eddie Brock, to survive. While Carnage, the offspring of Venom, is more connected to his host, Cletus Kasady, due to carnage residing in Cletus's bloodstream. Cletus is a more cold blooded, evil villain causing Carnage to be more violent and rampage. Eddie Brock was a journalist and a harmless guy, after having patience with Venom being blood thirsty and somewhat violent, they came to an agreement, to only eat the bad guys and spare the innocent.

The first time Venom appeared was in May of 1988, and the first movie was in October of 2018. Spider-Man originally mistook Venom as a black suit, unaware he would eventually be taken over by the symbiote. Spider-Man ends up rejecting Venom, where they eventually work with each other when needed but also becoming archenemies.

== Collected edition ==
All four issues were collected in the 96-page softcover trade paperback Spider-Man: Venom vs. Carnage.
