= Anna Watson (comics) =

Publication information
- Publisher: Marvel Comics
- First appearance: The Amazing Spider-Man #15 (August 1964)
- Created by: Stan Lee (writer); Steve Ditko (artist)

In-story information
- Supporting character of: Spider-Man

Anna May Watson is a character appearing in American comic books published by Marvel Comics. The character is depicted as a supporting character of Spider-Man.

== Publication history ==
The character, created by Stan Lee and Steve Ditko, first appeared in The Amazing Spider-Man #15. Her first appearance helped foreshadow the first appearance of Mary Jane Watson as Mary Jane would be referenced as the niece of Anna.

== Fictional character biography ==
Anna Watson is depicted as Mary Jane Watson's aunt, an old friend of Aunt May, and a recurring character in various Spider-Man titles. She is depicted as filling the same role of surrogate mother in Mary Jane's life as May does for Peter Parker. For a period of time when May was believed to be dead, she moved in with Peter and Mary Jane. While initially very supportive of Peter, she becomes suspicious with his long absences and unreliability.

== Other versions ==
=== Amazing Spider-Man: Renew Your Vows ===
An alternate universe version of Anna Watson appears in "Amazing Spider-Man: Renew Your Vows". This version is the great-aunt of Annie Parker. She is later mentioned to have died.

=== MC2 ===
In the "MC2" reality, Anna Watson is the great-aunt of Mayday Parker.

=== Ultimate Universe ===
An alternate universe version of Anna Watson from Earth-6160 appears in Ultimate Spider-Man.

== In other media ==
- Anna Watson appears in the Spider-Man: The Animated Series, voiced by Majel Barrett. Additionally, an alternate reality incarnation who is more supportive of Peter appears in the series finale "Farewell Spider-Man".
- Anna Watson appears in The Spectacular Spider-Man, voiced by Kath Soucie.
