= Ghost Rider: Road to Damnation =

Miniseries

- Cover to Ghost Rider - Road to Damnation #2. Art by Clayton Crain

Publication information
- Publisher: Marvel Comics
- Publication date: November 2005–April 2006
- No. of issues: 6

Creative team
- Written by: Garth Ennis
- Artist(s): Clayton Crain

Ghost Rider: Road to Damnation is a six-issue comics miniseries starring the supernatural biker superhero Ghost Rider. It is written by Garth Ennis, illustrated by Clayton Crain, and was first published under the Marvel Knights imprint of Marvel Comics from 2005 to 2006. Although "Road to Damnation" was the title of the story, the title of the book was simply Ghost Rider when it was first published. When the miniseries was collected into a single edition in 2006, it was published under the name: Ghost Rider: Road to Damnation.

== Plot ==
A demon by the name of Kazaan found a way to bring hell to the world. Ghost Rider has been trapped in hell for two years where every night, he rides from one side of hell to the other towards the gates, which are slowly inching closed. Should he ever reach the Gates of Hell and pass through them, he will be free. However, every single night, the worst demons in hell chase him to the gates and tear him apart, to be put back together in the morning and repeat the torment again. One night he meets an angel named Malachi. Malachi tells Ghost Rider that if he can stop Kazaan, he will be free from hell. Ghost Rider also has to beat an archangel named Ruth and a demon named Hoss to Kazaan. He eventually teams up with Hoss to beat Ruth. In the end, Kazaan is sent back to hell.

Malachi tells Ghost Rider that he lied, and no one can ever truly escape the pit. Malachi is suddenly attacked; his wings being ripped off thereby made mortal by Ruth. Though the Ghost Rider succeeded in his mission, and cannot be set free from hell, he is told, "Ya gotta take your pleasure where ya can." The Ghost Rider returns to his punishment of racing to the gates every night, however, he now drags Malachi in chains behind his motorcycle to be forever tortured with him.

== In other media ==
The comic series served as an inspiration for the 2011 film Ghost Rider: Spirit of Vengeance, directed by Mark Neveldine and Brian Taylor.
