= Shocker (character) =

Fictional Marvel supervillain

- Cover artwork of the Shocker in The Amazing Spider-Man #579B (alternate cover) (December 2008). Art by Mike McKone.

Publication information
- Publisher: Marvel Comics
- First appearance: The Amazing Spider-Man #46 (March 1967)
- Created by: Stan Lee (writer); John Romita Sr. (artist)

In-story information
- Alter ego: Herman Schultz
- Species: Human
- Team affiliations: Sinister Six; Masters of Evil; Sinister Syndicate; Thunderbolts; Villains for Hire
- Notable aliases: Quilty
- Abilities: Skilled inventor, engineer, martial artist and acrobat; Uses battlesuit equipped with vibro-shock gauntlets that project air blasts and deflect physical attacks

The Shocker (Herman Schultz) is a supervillain appearing in American comic books published by Marvel Comics. Created by Stan Lee and John Romita Sr, the character debuted in The Amazing Spider-Man #46 (March 1967). He is usually depicted as an enemy of the superhero Spider-Man, and belongs to the collective of adversaries that make up his rogues gallery.

Herman Schultz is a self-taught engineer and renowned safe cracker who becomes a professional criminal known as the Shocker, named after his signature gauntlets that can fire compressed air and produce vibrational shock waves. A yellow and red costume with a checkered design serves as the character's visual leitmotif. Unlike the majority of Spider-Man's recurring rogues, the Shocker is not driven by powerlust or revenge against the hero, but by a desire to settle down with his ill-gotten gains. This sets him apart from Spider-Man's more villainous foes, as his primary motivation for turning to crime is self-gain, and he strives to avoid civilian casualties during his criminal activities. The character was killed in the 2026 storyline "Amazing Spider-Man/Venom: Death Spiral", which also revealed him as a distant relative of Mary Jane Watson.

The Shocker has been adapted from the comics into various forms of media, having been voiced by Jim Cummings in Spider-Man: The Animated Series (1994), Jeff Bennett in The Spectacular Spider-Man (2008), and David B. Mitchell in the video game Marvel's Spider-Man (2018). Two iterations of the character were featured in the Marvel Cinematic Universe film Spider-Man: Homecoming (2017), with Herman Schultz portrayed by Bokeem Woodbine and Jackson Brice portrayed by Logan Marshall-Green.

== Publication history ==
The Shocker first appeared in The Amazing Spider-Man #46 (March 1967) and was created by Stan Lee and John Romita Sr. In an interview, Romita discussed how he designed the character: "I used a lot of very subliminal feeling. While designing the Shocker costume, for some reason, I thought 'cushion' and 'quilt.' I'm thinking, if the guy has a shocking power and vibrates buildings so they fell apart by shaking them, then there's got to be some kind of cushion effect, and so, subliminally, I did it."

The Shocker appeared as a regular character in Thunderbolts from issue #157 to 162, when he deserted the team. He was also one of the main characters in "The Superior Foes of Spider-Man" series.

== Fictional character biography ==
Herman Schultz was born in New York City to Marianne Sinek and Henrik Schultz. He was a high school dropout who had brilliant talents as both an inventor and an engineer. Instead of using such talents to gain legitimate employment, he became a successful burglar and the world's best safe-cracker (according to him in later stories). After finally being caught and incarcerated for his crimes, he developed a pair of gauntlets designed to shoot air blasts, vibrating at high frequency. Schultz uses his gauntlets to escape from prison and becomes the supervillain known as "the Shocker". He defeats Spider-Man in their first confrontation during a robbery. While robbing a bank, he was later beaten and sent back to prison after Spider-Man pinned Schultz's thumbs away from the gauntlets' triggers with his webbing and then knocked him out.

Shocker joins Egghead's Masters of Evil (with Radioactive Man, Tiger Shark, Moonstone, and Beetle) to incriminate Hank Pym, then on trial for treason. The Masters battle the Avengers in this encounter; Shocker is brainwashed and purposely abandoned by Egghead to deliver a false testimony, and subsequently cooperated with the authorities in exonerating the ex-Avenger. Shocker was later hired by the Nazi war criminal Baron Von Lundt to kill Dominic Fortune, and built the vibro-shock units into his entire uniform to do so.

Shocker escapes prison with the help of fellow inmate Boomerang. By this time, he has developed severe confidence issues and has become terrified that the Scourge of the Underworld is going to kill him. A tipping point occurs when Spider-Man apprehends him and seems to not take him seriously. Enraged, Shocker defeats Spider-Man and is about to finish him off when a Scourge imposter intervenes, causing Shocker to flee. When he next appeared his confidence issues are gone. He aims to hunt down Scourge himself and kill him first.

Shocker has proven to be a constant presence among Spider-Man's gallery of enemies. He often works as a member of a team (including the Sinister Six, the Sinister Syndicate, and the Masters of Evil) or in partnership with at least one other villain. He also teamed up with a large group of villains during the Acts of Vengeance, when he helped them unsuccessfully attack the Fantastic Four.

During the Origin of the Species storyline, Shocker is invited by Doctor Octopus to rejoin the reestablished Sinister Six, where he exchange for securing some specific items. He and Tombstone go after Menace's infant until Spider-Man interferes. After he passes out from his fight, the police arrive; Shocker is carried away by Tombstone who escapes. When Spider-Man goes on a rampage against the villains after the infant is stolen by Chameleon, Shocker is attacked in his hideout and tells Spider-Man that Chameleon has the baby at the Kravinoff Mansion.

Shocker features as one of the main characters in The Superior Foes of Spider-Man, which concludes with Silvermane crowning him the new don of the New York underworld after Shocker saves dozens of mobsters by singlehandedly defeating the Punisher. Shocker shares a meal with She-Hulk while they discuss a memory that she cannot remember. Shocker helps her by telling what little he remembers because she treated him well and bought him lunch, whereas other heroes would just beat him up and ask questions later.

During the "Devil's Reign" storyline, Shocker was seen as a member of Mayor Wilson Fisk's incarnation of the Thunderbolts after Fisk made superhero activities illegal. After defeating Darkhawk, Shocker tried to get Luke Cage and Jessica Jones to surrender only to be defeated by them.

During the "Amazing Spider-Man/Venom: Death Spiral" storyline, Shocker is murdered by Torment, a mysterious serial killer targeting relatives of Peter Parker, Mary Jane Watson, and Eddie Brock. Shocker is revealed to be related to Watson through his cousin's marriage to a member of the Watson family.

== Characterization ==
=== Skills and equipment ===
Shocker wears a pair of gauntlets he designed with vibro-shock units known as "vibro-smashers" that, when activated by a pump-action thumb trigger, can project a concentrated blast of compressed air that vibrates at an intense frequency. This creates a series of rapid-succession high-pressure air blasts that result in a series of powerful impacts. This allows Shocker to both effectively throw long range vibrational punches from a distance, creating destructive vibrations that can crumble solid concrete and cause extensive damage to the human body and its internal organs, as well as throw shock waves which vibrate the structure of something to weaken or destroy it. A lesser known ability of the gauntlets allows Shocker to make incredible leaps, by directing the air blasts toward the ground in front of him. Holding the thumb triggers down for an extended period of time increases the intensity, speed, and even spread of the air blasts.

Shocker's costume contains patches designed to absorb the force of his gauntlets and prevent them from harming him. The costume is made of foam-lined synthetic fabric which absorbs all vibrations and establishes a vibrational shield which deflects normal blows and allows him to slip from any grasp.

Shocker later created a number of built-in shock units, which generate a protective vibrational field when triggered by accompanying motion detectors. Besides deflecting most physical blows, this makes it difficult, if not impossible for someone to physically assault or grasp him by surprise.

=== Personality ===
While most Spider-Man villains usually shift from their original goals to a vendetta against the hero, Shocker is still concerned largely with making a living and protecting his reputation. As such, the character is usually portrayed as behaving in a more professional manner than the majority of Spider-Man's maniacal peers.

Shocker has a notably rational personality among Spider-Man's enemies. He has often been shown to recognize his own limitations amongst a universe of super-powered individuals. He was once stricken with chronic anxiety and paranoia (in the Deadly Foes of Spider-Man series) stemming from his fears about being targeted by anti-heroes Scourge and the Punisher. While partnered with the Trapster, he mentions that he engages in psychotherapy.

In later stories ("Venomous" and "Senseless Violence"), Shocker has revealed that he is extremely frustrated with his place in life, not wanting to be known as a punching bag for superheroes like Spider-Man. He unsuccessfully attempts to purchase the Venom symbiote at an auction to gain some respect. When temporarily partnered with Hydro-Man, he rebukes Morrie's suggestion that they go kill Spider-Man, being far more interested in financially lucrative ventures and trying to rebuild his professional reputation.

== Other characters named Shocker ==
=== Dalt Kendall ===
Dalt Kendall was a brilliant scientist who was obsessed with electric eels. He began breeding a pair of gigantic electric eels in his secret lab, slowly exposing himself to their electricity. Over time, his body developed an immunity to electricity and the ability to discharge electricity at will. Using his new powers, he began a life of crime, calling himself the Shocker. Madeline Joyce witnessed his first robbery and, in her costumed identity of Miss America, attempted to apprehend the Shocker. Shocker managed to evade capture several times before Miss America finally discovered the entrance to his secret lab. Once he discovered she was in his hideout, Shocker began to divulge the source of his powers before taking the opportunity to attack the heroine. Miss America then tricked him into thinking she was unconscious and struck back at him, punching him into his pet electric eel aquarium. Shocker is unable to absorb the eels' electricity, resulting in his death.

=== Randall Darby ===
Randall Darby is a mutant who took the Shocker codename after being recruited by Magneto to become a member of his Brotherhood of Mutants. After Magneto abandons him, Darby changes his codename to Paralyzer.

== Reception ==
In a 2014 list by IGN ranking Spider-Man's 25 greatest villains, Shocker was ranked 23rd.

In 2020, CBR.com ranked Shocker 6th in their "10 Most Powerful Members of the Sinister Syndicate" list.

== Other versions ==
Various alternate universe versions of Shocker have appeared throughout the character's publication history.

=== Amazing Spider-Man: Renew Your Vows ===
In The Amazing Spider-Man: Renew Your Vows, Shocker is an enforcer of Regent and member of the Sinister Six.

=== Marvel Noir ===
In Marvel Noir, Shocker is an ally of the Nazis who built a battle suit for their use.

=== Ultimate Marvel ===
In the Ultimate Marvel universe, Shocker is a former employee of Roxxon Industries.

=== Ultimate Universe ===
In the Ultimate Universe imprint, Shocker stole his gauntlets from a package sent by Tony Stark to an unknown recipient who died of a heart attack rather than creating them himself.

== In other media ==
=== Television ===
- The Herman Schultz incarnation of the Shocker appears in the Spider-Man and His Amazing Friends episode "Along Came a Spidey", voiced by John Stephenson.
- The Herman Schultz incarnation of the Shocker appears in Spider-Man: The Animated Series, voiced by Jim Cummings. This version is a member of Kingpin's Insidious Six whose gauntlets fire electricity rather than compressed air.
- A composite character incarnation of the Shocker appears in The Spectacular Spider-Man, voiced by Jeff Bennett. This version is Montana of the Enforcers, a change which was made because series producer Greg Weisman believed Montana to be more interesting and menacing than Herman Schultz.
- The Herman Schultz incarnation of the Shocker appears in Ultimate Spider-Man (2012), voiced by Troy Baker.
- Herman Schultz appears in the Spider-Man (2017) episode "Osborn Academy", voiced by Cameron Boyce. This version is a teenage student of the titular school who specializes in vibration technology and a friend of Clayton Cole.

=== Film ===
The Herman Schultz incarnation of the Shocker appears in Spider-Man: Homecoming, portrayed by Bokeem Woodbine. This version is an employee of Adrian Toomes' salvaging company who turned to crime alongside the rest of the group once they were put out of business by the Department of Damage Control. Additionally, Schultz is the second individual to use the Shocker alias after Toomes accidentally kills the first, Jackson Brice (portrayed by Logan Marshall-Green), and wields a modified version of Crossbones' vibro-blast emitting gauntlet. Schultz assists Toomes in his criminal operations until he is defeated by Spider-Man and arrested by the authorities.

=== Video games ===
- Android replicas of the Shocker appear as mini-bosses in Spider-Man/X-Men: Arcade's Revenge.
- The Herman Schultz incarnation of the Shocker appears as a mini-boss in Spider-Man (1995).
- The Herman Schultz incarnation of the Shocker appears in Spider-Man: The Sinister Six, voiced by David Hadinger. This version is a member of the titular team.
- The Herman Schultz incarnation of the Shocker appears as the first boss of Spider-Man 2: Enter Electro, voiced by Daran Norris. This version is an underling of Electro.
- The Herman Schultz incarnation of the Shocker appears in Spider-Man (2002), voiced by Michael Beattie.
- The Herman Schultz incarnation of the Shocker appears in Spider-Man 2, voiced again by Michael Beattie. This version's gauntlets produce electricity instead of shockwaves.
- The Ultimate Marvel incarnation of Herman Schultz / Shocker appears as a boss in Ultimate Spider-Man (2005), voiced by Brian George.
- The Herman Schultz incarnation of the Shocker appears as a mini-boss in Marvel: Ultimate Alliance, voiced by Michael Gough. This version is a member of Doctor Doom's Masters of Evil.
- The Herman Schultz incarnation of the Shocker appears as a boss and an optional assist character in the PSP and PS2 versions of Spider-Man: Web of Shadows, voiced by Liam O'Brien. He is sought out by Spider-Man for his gauntlets, which can be used to construct a sonic emitter to counter symbiotes. After being defeated, the player can choose to turn Shocker over to the authorities, or let him go after he promises to return the favor by assisting Spider-Man.
- The Herman Schultz incarnation of the Shocker appears as a mini-boss in the next-gen versions of Marvel: Ultimate Alliance 2, voiced by Rick D. Wasserman.
- The Herman Schultz incarnation of the Shocker appears in the Nintendo DS version of Spider-Man: Edge of Time, voiced by Steve Blum.
- The Herman Schultz incarnation of the Shocker appears in Marvel Heroes, voiced by Dave Boat.
- The Herman Schultz incarnation of the Shocker appears as a playable character in Lego Marvel Super Heroes, voiced by Greg Cipes.
- The Herman Schultz incarnation of the Shocker appears as a boss and playable character in Marvel Avengers Alliance.
- The Herman Schultz incarnation of the Shocker appears as the first boss of The Amazing Spider-Man 2, voiced by Ryan Alosio. This version is a low-level gang boss and arms dealer who acquires his Shocker equipment while raiding Oscorp for advanced weapons. He is defeated by Spider-Man and subsequently arrested.
- The Herman Schultz incarnation of the Shocker appears as a mini-boss in Marvel: Avengers Alliance 2.
- The Herman Schultz incarnation of the Shocker appears as a playable character and boss in Lego Marvel Super Heroes 2. Additionally, the Spider-Man: Homecoming incarnation is also playable and serves as a mini-boss.
- The Herman Schultz incarnation of the Shocker appears in Marvel Strike Force as a member of the Sinister Six.
- The Herman Schultz incarnation of the Shocker appears as a boss in Marvel's Spider-Man (2018), voiced by Dave B. Mitchell. This version sports a modernized costume, can use his gauntlets to jump great lengths, and has fought Spider-Man in the past, being regarded as his first real "super" adversary. He also explicitly avoids civilian casualties and only engages in criminal activities to make a living. After being released from prison on parole, Shocker is blackmailed by Mister Negative's gang into committing robberies to finance their operations until he is defeated by Spider-Man and re-incarcerated.
