= The Amazing Spider-Man: Renew Your Vows =

Comic book series

- Cover of The Amazing Spider-Man: Renew Your Vows #1. Art by Adam Kubert and Justin Ponsor.

Publication information
- Publisher: Marvel Comics
- Schedule: Monthly
- Format: Ongoing series
- Publication date: Volume 1 June – September 2015; Volume 2 November 2016 – September 2018
- No. of issues: Volume 1: 5 Volume 2: 23
- Main characters: Spider-Man (Peter Parker); Spinneret (Mary Jane Watson); Spiderling (Anna-May "Annie" Parker)

Creative team
- Written by: Dan Slott & Adam Kubert (Secret Wars); Gerry Conway & Ryan Stegman (Brawl in the Family and The Venom Experiment); Jody Houser (Eight Years Later and Are You Okay, Annie?)
- Penciller(s): Adam Kubert & Nick Roche
- Inker: John Dell
- Letterer: Joe Caramagna
- Colorist: Justin Ponsor
- Editor(s): Nick Lowe & Devin Lewis

The Amazing Spider-Man: Renew Your Vows is two series of comic books published by Marvel Comics. The series revolves around Peter Parker / Spider-Man and Mary Jane Watson having remained married and raising a daughter named Anna-May "Annie" Parker, with Mary Jane and Annie further becoming the superheroes Spinneret and Spiderling. The original series was a 2015 comic book limited series that tied into that year's Secret Wars event. Following the event's end, the popularity of the series led to a sequel ongoing series set in the alternate reality of Earth-18119, which was published from 2016 to 2018.

Mary Jane and Annie from this series make cameo appearances in the 2023 feature film Spider-Man: Across the Spider-Verse, depicted as members of Miguel O'Hara's Spider-Society.

== Publication history ==
The first volume takes place during the "Secret Wars" storyline and was published as a limited series in 2015. Dan Slott and Adam Kubert's story occurs in a Battleworld which was a "drastically reimagined incarnation of New York City".

A second volume, now as an ongoing series part of the 2016 "Marvel NOW!" relaunch, details the further tales of Spider-Man and his family after their reality was restored. Originally, Gerry Conway was the lead writer of the volume; Ryan Stegman joined as both co-writer and artist with issue #8. With issue #13, "the series new creative team of writer Jody Houser and artist Nick Roche kicked off their run by jumping eight years into the Parker family's future". The second volume is followed by the three issue limited series Spider-Girls which was part of the 2018 comics event Spider-Geddon.

CBR highlighted that while events of the "One More Day" storyline still "haven't been totally undone in the Marvel comic continuum", as a result of Renew Your Vows, both MJ and Peter of Earth 616 share "small fragments of memories of their life and decided to begin again, with a fresh new start".

== Plot ==
=== Volume one: Secret Wars ===
During the "Secret Wars" storyline, heroes from all over the Battleworld domain of the Regency have gone missing. With the X-Men missing, the Avengers suspect that Augustus Roman is behind this. As Spider-Man hears of this, Hawkeye mentions a mass-breakout at Ryker's Island. While the Avengers head out to fight Regent, Spider-Man heads home to meet with his wife Mary Jane Watson where he finds his daughter Annie in the clutches of Venom. Spider-Man brutally defeats Venom. As the superheroes are being defeated by Regent, Mary Jane uses a fire truck's siren to help Spider-Man force Venom into a burning building and brings the structure down on Venom. With the superheroes defeated by Regent, Peter Parker retires as Spider-Man to keep his family safe.

In light of Regent's victory, Peter obtains inhibitor bracelets so that Regent will not detect him or Annie. When Annie's inhibitor bracelet breaks down before school, she must keep her abilities in check. Peter takes pictures of Demolition Man protesting the Regent's rule when he is defeated by Boomerang, Rhino, and Shocker. Arriving at the Daily Bugle, Peter hears about the news that superpowered people were sighted at the school which Annie attends. Using a hood as a disguise, Peter jumps from building to building where he arrives to find the Power Pack fighting Regent's minions. As Peter distracts Regent's minions so that the Power Pack can escape, Mary Jane arrives and makes off with Annie. At Regent's headquarters, Regent figures out that Spider-Man has been sighted and unleashes his Sinister Six (consisting of Doctor Octopus, Hobgoblin, Kraven the Hunter, Mysterio, Shocker, and Vulture) to hunt down Spider-Man.

When Spider-Man goes to get some inhibitor bracelets from Tinkerer, he discovers that Tinkerer has tipped off the Sinister Six. Spider-Man violently kills Doctor Octopus before the rest of the Sinister Six arrive where they learn that Spider-Man made off with the only inhibitor bracelet. Arriving home, Peter works to reconfigure the inhibitor bracelet for Annie. Regent broadcasts that he will be doing a compulsory screening at Annie's school, 122 Mamie Fay. Though Peter, Mary Jane, and Annie pass the scans, another kid doesn't, causing Peter to turn into Spider-Man to defend him. While Spider-Man faces the Sinister Six which results in Hobgoblin getting caught in the explosion of his own Pumpkin Bomb, Mary Jane and Annie are taken to safety by Mockingbird and Prowler who are posing as Regent's agents.

Noticing that Mary Jane and Annie are missing, Spider-Man brutally takes down the Sinister Six which results in Vulture being incapacitated. Sandman appears and asks Peter to come to S.H.I.E.L.D. with him, but are both subdued when Regent arrives. Meanwhile, Mary Jane and Annie are introduced to S.H.I.E.L.D. and its leader Hawkeye. At Regent's base, Spider-Man and Sandman have been taken prisoner. Back at S.H.I.E.L.D., Dr. Johnathon Ohnn reverse-engineers Annie's inhibitor bracelet to create an arrowhead that would neutralize Regent's powers, though they will need a DNA sample from him in order for it to work. After Regent reads Sandman's mind, he recruits Beetle, Boomerang, and Rhino to fill in the membership of the Sinister Six and sends them to attack the S.H.I.E.L.D. base. When Dr. Ohnn uses his portals to help with the escape, Annie jumps into action. With one of Dr. Ohnn's portals sewn into him, Sandman activates it so that Mary Jane, Annie, Hawkeye, Mockingbird, and Prowler can get into it.

As S.H.I.E.L.D. faces the Regent, Mary Jane and Annie confront his scientists, who are led by Dr. Shannon Stillwell. Using the same type of armor as the Regent, Mary Jane helps Annie to disable the mechanism that held the captive heroes in order for Regent to draw in their powers. When this attracts the attention of Regent, Spider-Man escapes and takes the fight with Regent to the streets. Annie joins the fight and uses the special arrowhead on Regent. Despite this, Regent is still powerful enough to grab and threaten Annie. Spider-Man uses a bluff to get close to Regent so that he can defeat him. Using an improvised restraining unit made by Prowler, S.H.I.E.L.D takes Regent into their custody as Spider-Man and his family resume their normal lives.

=== Volume two: Gerry Conway & Ryan Stegman era ===
Mary Jane Watson soon decides she wants to share in her husband's crimefighting life and that their daughter should join her. Peter Parker develops a costume for her using technology acquired from the aftermath of the battle with The Regent, this suit enables Mary Jane to borrow powers and abilities from her husband, but its side-effects leave Peter weakened. Annie is given a new costume and acquires the codename "Spiderling," whereas Mary Jane becomes "Spinneret."

After fighting off threats from the Mole Man, the Brotherhood of Mutants, and Mysterio, Mary Jane considers trying an alternative means of supporting her husband in his crime-fighting as her costume is siphoning off too much of his strength, and so she agrees to bond with an experimental bio-suit supplied by former family friend Liz Allan, but unbeknown to her, the suit is the Venom symbiote. The symbiote attempts to assert control of Mary Jane, causing her to inflict pain on some criminals. With the help of Peter and her own mental durability, Mary Jane eventually brings the symbiote under control.

Shortly after, Mary Jane is recruited to battle the inter-dimensional threat of the Poisons during the Venomverse while Peter and Annie save a young Normie Osborn from The Lizard and his son Billy. Normie, still resentful of Spider-Man's involvement in the death of Harry Osborn, arranges Annie's capture with the aid of his mother's personal assistant Ms. January. After a conversation with Annie, Normie has a change of heart and lets her go, but Ms. January attacks the Spider-Family with a giant mechanical version of the Green Goblin. The Spider-Family defeat the Goblin, but not before it destroys the Venom symbiote, leaving Mary Jane no choice but to return to her original outfit. Normie makes peace with the family.

=== Volume two: Jody Houser era ===
Eight years later, Annie Parker has grown into a temperamental teenager frustrated with her "silly" codename of Spiderling. Having trained with the X-Men, she is eager to prove herself. A special family day out for the Parkers leads to them combating the forces of Mister Sinister.

Peter, having learned that the Bugle is paying less and less for photos as virtually anyone can take one now on their digital devices, decides to take up the task of teaching once more at Annie's school, which leads to awkward moments between him and his daughter as Annie becomes embarrassed to be in the same hallway as him, fearing he will cramp her style. She befriends two students at the school whose experiments mutate them. Falling in with a bad crowd, Annie eventually prevents the students from killing Normie Osborn, now also older. It is revealed Annie (as Spiderling), and Normie had hung out a lot in their childhood but had lost touch.

Shortly after this, Peter tells Annie of a time earlier in his and Mary Jane's lives when they saved a passenger ship together during a vacation. Back in the present, the Spider-Family again battle Mister Sinister and save the X-Mansion from an attack by him and several genetically modified Spider-Clones. The day is won, but the Parker family car is destroyed.

=== Spider-Geddon and Spider-Girls ===
With Annie's parents assisting the war effort against the Inheritors on Earth-616, Annie, with the help of Anya Corazon/Spider-Girl of Earth-616 and May "Mayday" Parker/Spider-Woman of Earth-982, unlocks the mysteries of the Spider-Scrolls and find a means of stopping their enemies. Annie learns that she is the "Patternmaker", the fourth Spider involved in the prophecy alongside Mayday's brother Benjy (The Scion), Silk (The Bride), and The Other.

After battling two of the Inheritors on Annie's world, Mayday, Anya, and Annie retreat to Loomworld where they find the Web of Destiny has been sabotaged. They then use the scrolls to return to Earth-616 and use Annie's web-weaving powers to help the web warriors defeat the Inheritors and their leader Solus. As the Web Warriors say their respective goodbyes, Mayday wonders what had become of "The Other," Annie revealing that the totem is still in play and that it's closer to her than she knows. Back on Mayday's world, a hand bursts out of a grave, revealing that the Other has fused with Mayday's late father, her world's Peter Parker, resurrecting him. Peter and MJ later attend the funeral of Karn on Loomworld.

Sometime after the events of Spider-Geddon, Annie was tangled in the Web of Destiny while reforging it. After Miles Morales and Spider-Zero free her, she untangles the web and sets everything back to normal.

== Reception ==
=== Volume one ===
In January 2020, when Diamond Comics released its list of the "Top 100 Best-Selling Comics of the Decade", Renew Your Vows issue #1 was ranked at #67.

Reviewing the first issue for ComicBook.com, Chase Magnett gave it a C grade and wrote that it "is an uneven issue from all creators involved. Slott capably embraces the fun and strangeness of this period in Marvel Comics history, but his pacing leaves something to be desired. Kubert and Dell, on the other hand, are at the top of their game as long as they are portraying characters in masks. The story's arrangement as a prologue leaves a lot of interesting ideas to be explored and time to iron out the flaws. It's an issue filled with potential, but it's fulfillment is far from certain". Reviewing the fifth issue for IGN, Jesse Schedeen gave it a 6.8/10. He wrote that "Renew Your Vows doesn't quite live up to the promise it showed in earlier issues. It's fun seeing the entire Parker family united in battling evil, but said evil is still a bland, unremarkable villain. This finale issue doesn't pack enough of a punch, and it offers no indication of what elements might cross over into the relaunched Amazing Spider-Man".

Stephen Totilo, in his review of all 44 Secret Wars tie-in comics for Kotaku, put Renew Your Vows in the second highest category at "very good". Totilo wrote that the series was "a more harrowing than expected what-if featuring a Peter Parker who stayed married to Mary Jane and had a daughter with her. Longtime Spider-Man writer Dan Slott tells the tale which has Peter and Mary Jane in perpetual panic as they try to keep their daughter safe in a New York that is ruled by a hero-destroying tyrant. The one drawback is that the series feels like a thought experiment and lacks any connection to the very long Peter Parker story that Slott has been telling for about a decade. For some, that will likely be a plus".

=== Volume two ===
Reviewing the first post-Secret Wars issue for IGN, Schedeen commented that the issue was worth the cover price and rated the issue as 8.7/10. He wrote that "the resulting blend of familiar and new elements works very well. [...] Conway's script is funny, charming, and most importantly, really nails the Parker family dynamic. [...] It's great seeing Stegman on a Spider-Man comic again after the great work he delivered on Scarlet Spider and Superior Spider-Man. [...] The series doesn't just coast by on nostalgia, as the fact that Peter is now a loving husband and father adds crucial new layers to his story".

Reviewing issue #15 for IGN, Blair Marnell gave it a 6.7/10 and wrote that "Renew Your Vows hasn't quite found its spider legs under the new creative team, and it feels like it's missing the mandate that the earliest issues had. Jody Houser has put the focus squarely on Spiderling, which has somewhat marginalized Peter and MJ. [...] Roche's style also takes some getting used to, and his faces for Mary Jane and Anna-May get a little bit too similar at times". Marnell commented that "there's still some real potential here" and "I'm willing to stick with this book for now to see where it goes from here". Reviewing issue #16 for IGN, Kat Calamia gave it a 7.0/10 and commented that each character was given plot points allowing each "their own individual storylines, while also allowing family to stay at the heart of the comic book. The Amazing Spider-Man: Renew Your Vows #16 touches upon some classic Spider-Man themes, but still struggles to find its own voice in the mix". In January 2018, Rich Johnston, for Bleeding Cool, commented on the recent Marvel Comics sales chart; he highlighted that Renew Your Vows was at #102 which was "a massive drop — the biggest fall of the chart. Maybe people don't want to read about a married Spider-Man and Mary Jane after all".

== Collected editions ==
Title	Material collected	Publication date	ISBN
Amazing Spider-Man: Renew Your Vows Vol. 1: Secret Wars	Amazing Spider-Man: Renew Your Vows (vol. 1) #1–5, Secret Wars: Secret Love #1	December 16, 2015	ISBN 978-0-7851-9886-4
Amazing Spider-Man: Renew Your Vows Vol. 2: Brawl in the Family	Amazing Spider-Man: Renew Your Vows (vol. 2) #1–5	June 14, 2017	ISBN 978-1-302-90580-4
Amazing Spider-Man: Renew Your Vows Vol. 3: The Venom Experiment	Amazing Spider-Man: Renew Your Vows (vol. 2) #6–12	November 29, 2017	ISBN 978-1-302-90581-1
Amazing Spider-Man: Renew Your Vows Vol. 4: Eight Years Later	Amazing Spider-Man: Renew Your Vows (vol. 2) #13–18	May 30, 2018	ISBN 978-1-302-90582-8
Amazing Spider-Man: Renew Your Vows Vol. 5: Are You Okay, Annie?	Amazing Spider-Man: Renew Your Vows (vol. 2) #19–23	November 21, 2018	ISBN 978-1-302-91061-7

== In other media ==
The titular family of Peter Parker / Spider-Man, Mary Jane Watson-Parker / Spinneret, and Anna-May "Annie" Watson-Parker / Spiderling made their cinematic debuts in the 2023 feature film Spider-Man: Across the Spider-Verse, depicted as members of Miguel O'Hara's Spider-Society.
