= Eddie Brock: Carnage =

Comic book series by Marvel Comics

Publication information
- Publisher: Marvel Comics
- Schedule: Monthly
- Format: Limited series
- Genre: Horror; Superhero
- Publication date: February 12, 2025 – November 12, 2025
- No. of issues: 10
- Main character(s): Eddie Brock; Carnage; Muse; Misty Knight

Creative team
- Written by: Charles Soule
- Artist(s): Jesús Saiz; Juanan Ramirez

Eddie Brock: Carnage is an American comic book published by Marvel Comics, based on the characters Eddie Brock and Carnage. The 10-issue limited series–written by Charles Soule, and illustrated by Jesús Saiz and Juanan Ramirez–began publication on February 12, 2025, and concluded on November 12, 2025.

== Publication history ==
Eddie Brock: Carnage began publication on February 12, 2025, and concluded on November 12, 2025.

=== Issues ===
| Issue | Publication date | Ref. |
|---|---|---|
| #1 | February 12, 2025 | |
| #2 | March 19, 2025 | |
| #3 | April 23, 2025 | |
| #4 | May 28, 2025 | |
| #5 | June 11, 2025 | |
| #6 | July 16, 2025 | |
| #7 | August 13, 2025 | |
| #8 | September 10, 2025 | |
| #9 | October 8, 2025 | |
| #10 | November 12, 2025 | |

== See also ==
- List of Venom titles
