= Carnage (character) =

Character in the Marvel Universe

- Interior art from The Amazing Spider-Man #361 (April 1992) depicting Cletus Kasady as Carnage. Art by Mark Bagley.

Publication information
- Publisher: Marvel Comics
- First appearance: Unnamed:The Amazing Spider-Man #345 (March 1991); Cameo appearance: The Amazing Spider-Man #360 (March 1992); Full appearance: The Amazing Spider-Man #361 (April 1992)
- Created by: David Michelinie (writer); Mark Bagley (artist); Chris Marrinan (artist); Stan Lee (name and conceptual input)

In-story information
- Alter ego: Various hosts
- Species: Symbiote
- Place of origin: Rikers Island, New York
- Team affiliations: Carnage's Family; Astonishing Avengers; Frightful Four; Goblin Nation; New Avengers
- Partnerships: Shriek; Chthon; Knull; Maker; Magneto
- Notable aliases: Spider-Carnage, Carnage Cosmic, Superior Carnage, Red Goblin, The Red Slayer, Goblin Childe, The Crimson Leviathan
- Abilities: All powers of the predecessor's first human host, Spider-Man; Limited shapeshifting and camouflage; Symbiote's autonomous defense capabilities; Undetectable by Spider-Man's spider-sense

Carnage is a supervillain appearing in American comic books published by Marvel Comics, usually as an adversary of Spider-Man and the archenemy of its parent Venom, in particular the Eddie Brock incarnation. The character made its first full appearance in The Amazing Spider-Man #361 (April 1992), and was created by writer David Michelinie and artist Mark Bagley, although the first published artwork of Carnage was penciled by Chris Marrinan. Stan Lee would also have some input in the character's name and attributes, pushing for a villain who was darker and more vicious than Venom, due to the latter's scrupulous character development and evolution into an antihero.

Carnage belongs to a race of amorphous parasitic extraterrestrial organisms known as symbiotes, which form a symbiotic bond with their hosts and give them super-human abilities. Originating as an offspring of Venom, Carnage is much more powerful than its parent symbiote because of the symbiotes' biology, and is in many ways a darker version of him. Like Venom, Carnage has had multiple hosts over the years, but its most infamous one remains its first – serial killer Cletus Kasady, whose sadistic personality perfectly matches that of the symbiote. Other notable hosts include Ben Reilly, Karl Malus, and Norman Osborn, as well as Gwen Stacy and Mary Jane Watson in the alternate Ultimate Marvel (Earth-1610) and Spider-Gwen (Earth-65) continuities. The Carnage symbiote gave birth to its first significant offspring, Toxin, in 2004.

Since its original introduction in comics, the character has been adapted into other forms of media, such as television series and video games. Woody Harrelson voiced Carnage in its first live-action appearance in the film Venom: Let There Be Carnage (2021), set in Sony's Spider-Man Universe (SSU), and also portrayed Cletus Kasady, reprising his cameo role from Venom (2018). In 2009, the Cletus Kasady version of Carnage was ranked as IGN's 90th Greatest Comic Book Villain of All Time.

== Conception and creation ==
The Carnage symbiote was derived by writer David Michelinie while Mark Bagley designed the character. The symbiote was perceived to be a darker version of Venom, and was created due to the writers not wanting a replacement for Eddie Brock as Venom. Carnage was in part only created due to Venom's immense popularity with fans. The character was originally meant to be named "Chaos", until a different company came out with a character with the same name. Then "Ravage" was considered before Michelinie discovered Ravage 2099 was soon to be released. Finally, assistant editor Eric Fein suggested "Carnage". Marvel co-founder and chairman Stan Lee would also have some input for the human host, having come up with the name "Cletus Kasady", with the idea of Carnage's host being a remorseless psychopath whose bond with his Symbiote was far more complete than Eddie Brock and Venom Symbiote's, and therefore would refer to himself as "I" instead of Venom's "we", signifying his Symbiote had little agency of its own and acted more as a weapon and extension of Kasady's will, maximizing his ability to murder people in creative and gruesome ways.

== Hosts ==
=== Cletus Kasady ===
When Eddie Brock's Venom symbiote soon returned to be bonded again, allowing Venom to escape prison, the symbiote left its offspring in the cell; due to its alien mindset, the symbiote felt no emotional attachment to its offspring, regarding it as insignificant, and thus never communicated its existence to Brock via their telepathic link. The new symbiote then bonded with Cletus Kasady through a cut on his hand, transforming him into Carnage. The bond between the Carnage symbiote and Kasady was not as strong as the bond between Brock and the Venom symbiote. However, Cletus Kasady was also a serial killer and thought of as insane. As a result, Carnage is far more violent, powerful, and deadly than Venom. Kasady and the symbiote would then be the main antagonist in "Maximum Carnage" and Kasady would continually be the most recurring character to use the Carnage symbiote in many publications.

=== Spider-Carnage (Ben Reilly) ===
The Carnage symbiote briefly managed to escape Kasady by traveling through the plumbing in his cell. It briefly used John Jameson as its host, but eventually transferred itself to Spider-Man— Ben Reilly at the time— when Ben bonded with it to prevent it from hurting any innocent people, creating Spider-Carnage. Ben's willpower held out against the symbiote's murderous desires long enough for him to return it to Ravencroft. Reilly subsequently attempted to destroy the symbiote by subjecting himself to a potentially lethal blast of microwaves, but it escaped back to Kasady after the microwaves forced it to separate from Reilly.

=== Superior Carnage (Karl Malus) ===
After Kasady was lobotomized, he was broken out of prison by Wizard and Klaw, who intended to recruit him into the Frightful Four and turn him into their version of Venom. After a failed attempt to control Kasady, Wizard transferred the Symbiote to Dr. Karl Malus. Malus was enraged and under the influence of the Symbiote tried to kill his teammates, but he was subdued by Klaw and controlled by Wizard, who renamed him "Superior Carnage" and equipped him with weapons.

The trio are confronted by the Superior Spider-Man and during their battle Wizard loses his control over Carnage and he is fatally injured once Spider-Man accidentally drops him due to the shock of finding out Wizard read his mind and knows about Otto Octavius. Carnage, now free, goes on a rampage and starts to kill anyone in front of him. Klaw tries to stop him, but due to his weapon being damaged, he fails and realizes that the only way is for Wizard to take back control. Both Carnage and Klaw make their way outside. Carnage fights the Superior Spider-Man and admits that although he liked using weapons, for him ripping and slashing the bodies is better. Klaw tries to get Wizard to control Carnage again but is killed by Carnage and the explosion separates the Symbiote from its host, only to bond with the injured Wizard.

=== Red Goblin (Norman Osborn) ===
Following the events of Secret Empire, the Carnage symbiote was stolen from an old S.H.I.E.L.D. storehouse by the then-powerless Norman Osborn. He initially found himself overwhelmed by the symbiote's desire for mindless slaughter when he allowed it to merge with him, but he has been able to 'persuade' the symbiote to let him take control of Carnage's powers to show it something other than 'boring' mindless slaughter. Part of Carnage is later transferred to Normie Osborn, turning him into a miniature version of Red Goblin.

=== Eddie Brock ===
==== Eddie Brock: Carnage ====
After the "Venom War" storyline, Eddie bonds with Carnage to survive, in Eddie Brock: Carnage, with Carnage joining the New Avengers.

=== Arthur Krane ===
Following the confrontation with the new King in Black, a piece of the symbiote survived and chooses a fish for a host and then attacks a shark. It eventually moves up the food chain and arrives on a fishing boat and begins again a killing spree. Inspired by what Eddie had done, Carnage formulated a new plan to make a comeback using the power Knull had bequeathed to create a rival Hive with itself as its nexus. Carnage slowly made its way back to New York – restoring itself by devouring everyone it came across en route. Once back in Manhattan, Carnage bonded to Senator Arthur Krane who was running a campaign to rid Earth of aliens. Carnage also began to infect many of the symbiotes left behind on Earth with its will, including Phage, Lasher, Riot, and Agony. However, Carnage's failed attempt to corrupt the Anti-Venom symbiote alerted Flash Thompson and Iron Man.

=== Other hosts ===
There have been other, shorter-term hosts for the symbiote.

==== John Jameson ====
Though bonded to Kasady's bloodstream the symbiote found a way to abandon its host by travelling through the Ravencroft Institute's water pipes overwhelming Ravencroft's chief, John Jameson. Carnage used him to commit further murders before eventually bonding with Spider-Man (who was Ben Reilly at the time).

==== Carnage Cosmic (Norrin Radd) ====
During a subsequent rampage, the Carnage symbiote briefly attempted to take control of the Silver Surfer, who was visiting Earth at the time to welcome the Fantastic Four after their return to life following the battle with Onslaught. As it turned out, Galactus had consumed a planet that many Symbiotes lived on, and the species had made it a race memory so that each future Symbiote could remember it, as well as the Surfer who had been Galactus's herald at the time. Upon seeing the Silver Surfer, the Carnage Symbiote abandoned Kasady and bonded with the Silver Surfer, becoming the Carnage Cosmic. Spider-Man and the Surfer managed to return the Symbiote to Kasady, who was dying from stomach cancer, and then the Silver Surfer proceeded to seal both host and Symbiote in an unbreakable prison in an attempt to force them both to reflect on their sins for eternity.

==== Scorn (Tanis Nieves) ====
After Carnage was ripped in half by the Sentry outside the Earth atmosphere, it is later discovered that, although the host was presumably killed, the symbiote survived by becoming dormant and returned to Earth, where it was discovered by Michael Hall, a competitor of Tony Stark. He brought Shriek and her doctor, Tanis Nieves, so he could use Shriek to keep the symbiote alive to use the properties of the symbiote, to create prosthetic limbs and exo-suits which respond in the same ways as a symbiote. Nieves is outfitted with one of these prosthetic arms after she is caught in an attack by Doppelganger, who tried to rescue Shriek. When near the symbiote, her arm goes wild and forces her to kill several scientists before the symbiote forcefully bonds to her, becoming the new Carnage. After the symbiote uses Nieves to break into a Hall Corporation facility, it is revealed that Kasady is alive (although both of his legs have been severed), his body preserved by the symbiote and repaired by Hall's prosthetics. Kasady reclaims the symbiote and becomes Carnage once more, attempting to avenge his captivity while Spider-Man and Iron Man struggle to stop him. It is then revealed that Carnage is once again pregnant, and the suit's spawn briefly bonds to Nieves, but she removes it from herself and the symbiote bonds to Shriek before being torn from her. Scared of Shriek's malice, the symbiote arm then rebounds to Nieves, creating Scorn.

==== Wizard (Bentley Wittman) ====
Ultimately, Spider-Man brings out Kasady's body to successfully draw the symbiote into it, which immediately devours Karl Malus and then prepares to finish off Wizard. However, Klaw's ephemeral spirit focuses his sound manipulation powers one last time for a split second to create a powerful sonic blast that disables Carnage, allowing the symbiote to be recaptured. In the epilogue it is shown that the symbiote has managed to repair Wizard's and Kasady's brain damage.

==== Carla Unger ====
After the symbiote had died in captivity, a sample of the symbiote was examined by Dr. Carla Unger, until the sample entered her body. When she went home, the symbiote formed around her and then she with the symbiote killed her abusive husband. After that, the symbiote consumed her and went to other hosts to get back to Kasady. When the symbiote arrived at an injured Kasady, a scientist, who wanted the symbiote for himself tried to kill Kasady, but the symbiote rebonded to Cletus.

== Powers and abilities ==
As Eddie Brock explained, the Carnage symbiote was born with abilities even more singular than those of its progenitor due to the fact that it gestated in an environment alien to it: Earth. Carnage endows Cletus Kasady with physical strength greater than that of Spider-Man and the Venom symbiote combined and shape-shifting abilities, allows it to project a web-like substance from any part of his body including the formation of weapons, and enables it to plant thoughts into a person's head using a symbiote tendril. Much like Spider-Man, Carnage has the ability to cling to virtually any surface, and has a version of Spider-Man's spider-sense, as the symbiote can relay information to him from any angle and grants Kasady the ability to "see" in any direction, warning him of incoming threats. As a result, Carnage can rapidly crawl, walk, or run across even slick surfaces. Carnage has abilities similar to those of Spider-Man as a direct result of Venom bonding to Peter Parker who transferred some of Spider-Man's power into the symbiote.

Kasady is able to regenerate damaged body tissues much faster and more extensively than that of an ordinary human. This has been shown as powerful enough to allow him to regenerate from losing any part of body, from head to feet. However, after being torn in half by the Sentry, he was fitted with artificial legs, but this occurred while he was separated from the symbiote. Kasady is also immune to the effects of all Earthly diseases and infections as long as he remains bonded with the symbiote. Like Venom, Carnage is vulnerable to sound (to a much smaller degree than Venom) and heat (to a much larger degree than Venom), and is undetectable to Spider-Man's spider-sense. Unlike Venom, Carnage can launch parts of itself at enemies in the form of solid weapons such as darts, spears, knives, axes, etc., although they disintegrate into dust within ten seconds of leaving Carnage's body. Carnage also has the unique ability to warp its appendages into different arms, legs, and even wings. This is shown on several occasions when Carnage mutates fingers and arms into what look like large swords.

Kasady has full control over the size, shape, color (usually red and black), texture, and hardness of the symbiote (and any part thereof). Like Venom, he can make the symbiote look like normal clothing (which he has done on rare occasion), or act as "camouflage" to an extent. With the symbiote bonded to his bloodstream, he can "regenerate" his costume from scratch simply by bleeding. The symbiote has the peculiar ability to block its parent Venom's ability to sense and track it. The symbiote is also able to rapidly adapt to new environments: when Kasady was taken into space by the Sentry, the symbiote was able to save his life by growing small sacks around his mouth that converted carbon dioxide into oxygen, allowing Kasady to stay alive long enough to be recovered.

In some interpretations, the Carnage symbiote is vampiric, feeding on and thus endangering its victims by only a mere touch. The symbiote has also shown the ability to call parts of itself back to the main symbiote, reintegrating them. It can also send irresistible commands to parts of itself that are in technology; these were used to break the bones of the Iron Rangers when they challenged Carnage while wearing symbiote-enhanced technological exo-suits. Using these last two abilities, Carnage absorbed the five Iron Rangers, grew to an enormous size, and became blue.

Finally, Carnage's powers have always been abnormally enhanced from the maniacal will and insane worldview that Kasady has had from the age of 8 years old. Kasady sees chaos and random, undirected violence as reality, and considers order and virtue to be illusions. He takes an almost artistic pride in his mayhem, likes to leave a trail for others to follow (usually leaving the phrase "Carnage Rules" written in his blood), and is recklessly willing to take on the most dangerous and powerful opponents and victims. On rare occasions, however, he has deliberately spared individuals to serve as witnesses for others: for instance, Joe Robertson's wife Martha during Savage Rebirth. Kasady is essentially taking revenge on the whole world for the torments, both real and imagined, of his childhood.

When the Carnage symbiote was joined with Norman Osborn, the resulting combination was immune to traditional symbiote weaknesses of sound and fire, although Anti-Venom's touch was still dangerous.

== Reception ==
- In 2020, CBR.com ranked Carnage 2nd in their "Marvel: Dark Spider-Man Villains, Ranked From Lamest To Coolest" list.
- In 2022, Screen Rant included Carnage in their "10 Spider-Man Villains That Are Smarter Than They Seem" list.
- In 2022, CBR.com ranked Carnage 1st in their "10 Most Violent Spider-Man Villains" list.

== Other versions ==
Many alternate versions of Carnage have appeared throughout the character's publication history.

=== Amalgam Comics ===
In the Amalgam Comics universe, Bizarnage is a composite character based on Carnage and DC Comics character Bizarro.

=== Earth-15 ===
On Earth-15, Carnage bonded with Spider-Man and went on to join Weapon X, a counterpart to the Exiles.

=== Earth-65 ===
On Earth-65, home universe of Spider-Woman, Mary Jane Watson was forcibly bonded with Carnage, drawing power from her secret love-hate and envy of Spider-Woman.

=== Marvel 2099 ===
In the unified Marvel 2099 reality of Earth-2099, Carnage is a modified version of the Venom symbiote.

=== MC2 ===
In the MC2 future timeline, Carnage, also known as Specimen 297, bonds with Spider-Girl's friend Moose Mansfield, who wants to use the symbiote to cure his father from cancer. In a later timeline, samples of the symbiote are used to create living weapons called Biopreds.

=== Ultimate Marvel ===
In the Ultimate Marvel universe, Carnage is a self-regenerating vampiric organism that was created by scientist Ben Reilly from DNA samples of Spider-Man and Lizard and the samples from Richard Parker's symbiotic suit research.

== In other media ==
=== Television ===
- The Cletus Kasady incarnation of Carnage and an alternate reality incarnation of Spider-Carnage appear in Spider-Man: The Animated Series, voiced by Scott Cleverdon and Christopher Daniel Barnes respectively. This version of the Carnage symbiote split off from the Venom symbiote after the latter returned to Earth. In the episodes "Venom Returns" and "Carnage", Baron Mordo takes possession of the former and gives it to Kasady in exchange for serving Dormammu, but Eddie Brock and Venom sacrifice themselves to pull Kasady and Carnage into Dormammu's realm. In the two-part series finale "Spider-Wars", the Carnage symbiote emerges from an interdimensional portal and bonds to a clone of Spider-Man from an alternate universe, turning him into Spider-Carnage before attempting to destroy the multiverse. However, the Beyonder and Madame Web summon a group of multiversal Spider-Men to stop Spider-Carnage.
- The Cletus Kasady incarnation of Carnage appears in Spider-Man Unlimited, voiced by Michael Donovan. This version of the Carnage symbiote evolved into a more powerful form, gaining full control of its host's body as well as acquiring elastic powers instead of webs and the ability to change into a liquid-like form. He and Venom travel to Counter-Earth to join the Synoptic, a hive mind of symbiotes, and ally themselves with the High Evolutionary while secretly helping the Synoptic grow powerful enough to infect the planet's population with symbiotes. In the series finale, the two symbiotes succeed in unleashing the Synoptic on Counter-Earth.
- Cletus Kasady makes a non-speaking appearance in The Spectacular Spider-Man episode "Reinforcement" as a patient of Ravencroft. Had the series continued, he would have become Carnage.
- Multiple incarnations of Carnage appear in Ultimate Spider-Man, voiced again by Dee Bradley Baker.
  - The first version is a mutated form of the Venom symbiote that appears in a self-titled second season episode and is created by the Green Goblin after injecting Peter Parker with a symbiote sample to turn him into the perfect symbiote. However, Peter's cells create Carnage, an unstable organism that can generate spikes all over its body. Carnage ultimately leaves Peter's body and is re-absorbed by Harry Osborn, who turns into Venom.
  - The second version appears in the fourth season, Ultimate Spider-Man vs. The Sinister Six, as a similar creature. Introduced in the three-part episode "The Symbiote Saga", it is created by Hydra scientist Dr. Michael Morbius after stealing a sample of the Venom symbiote from Agent Venom. The newly formed Carnage symbiote bonds with Doctor Octopus before Spider-Man and Agent Venom separate them. However, Carnage attains sentience and fights the heroes, eventually growing into a bomb that detonates and spreads across New York, infecting multiple hosts, such as the Hulk and Shriek. The Anti-Venom symbiote is eventually used to neutralize Carnage's swarm, but Carnage regenerates into a giant form which turns into an evolving hive of spiders and wasps led by Mary Jane Watson as the Carnage Queen. Spider-Man, Agent Venom, and the Patrioteer manage to separate them and seemingly destroy the symbiote. However, Watson retains traces of it, which she later uses to become Spider-Woman.
- Carnage appears in Guardians of the Galaxy. This version was created by Thanos during an experiment with symbiotes, was genetically modified to be obedient to Thanos, and can control all other symbiotes and their hosts.

=== Film ===
Carnage as depicted in Venom: Let There Be Carnage (2021)

- The Cletus Kasady incarnation of Carnage appears in Venom: Let There Be Carnage, portrayed by Woody Harrelson. This version of the Carnage symbiote was created when Kasady bit Eddie Brock's hand and absorbed part of the Venom symbiote. After saving Kasady from being executed by lethal injection and escaping from San Quentin State Prison, Carnage allies with him to kill Brock and Venom in exchange for also releasing Kasady's lover, Frances Barrison. Together, they go on a violent rampage through San Francisco and capture Detective Patrick Mulligan and Brock's ex, Anne Weying, to lure him and Venom out. After defeating Venom, Carnage is weakened by Dan Lewis, Anne's fiancé, who sprays him with flaming gasoline. This, coupled with Carnage and Kasady's incomplete bond, allows Venom to overpower and separate them before consuming the symbiote and killing Kasady.
- In Venom: The Last Dance, a symbiote based on the Ultimate Marvel version of Carnage, nicknamed "Lava" by the film's visual effects supervisors, helps Venom and other symbiotes fight against a Xenophage until being devoured by it.

=== Video games ===
- The Cletus Kasady incarnation of Carnage appears as a boss in The Amazing Spider-Man 2 (1992), Spider-Man and the X-Men: Arcade's Revenge, The Amazing Spider-Man: Lethal Foes, Spider-Man and Venom: Maximum Carnage, and Venom/Spider-Man: Separation Anxiety.
- The Cletus Kasady incarnation of Carnage appears in Spider-Man (2000), voiced by Dee Bradley Baker. While helping Doctor Octopus infect New York with symbiotes cloned from itself, the Carnage symbiote separates from Kasady and merges with Doc Ock, turning him into Monster Ock, only to be defeated by Spider-Man. The symbiote later sacrifices itself to save Doc Ock from his exploding lab.
- The Ultimate Marvel incarnation of the Carnage symbiote appears as a boss in Ultimate Spider-Man (2005). Unlike its comics counterpart, this version requires a host to survive and was created by Trask Industries using a sample of the Venom symbiote. After Adrian Toomes injects Peter Parker with the makeshift symbiote sample, he transforms into Carnage and breaks free, going on a rampage through the Trask building until he is defeated by Venom, who absorbs the symbiote from Peter's body.
- The Cletus Kasady incarnation of Carnage appears as a playable character in the PSP version of Spider-Man: Friend or Foe, voiced by Fred Tatasciore.
- The Cletus Kasady incarnation of Carnage appears as a playable character in the PS3, PS4, Xbox 360, Xbox One, and PC versions of Marvel: Ultimate Alliance 2. He also appears as a DLC character for the PS3 and Xbox 360 versions.
- The Ultimate Marvel incarnation of Carnage appears as a boss in Spider-Man: Shattered Dimensions, voiced again by Fred Tatasciore. After being captured and experimented on by S.H.I.E.L.D., the symbiote was merged with a fragment of the Tablet of Order and Chaos, increasing its powers and allowing it to drain the life energy of others. Carnage used these powers to break free and take over the S.H.I.E.L.D. base, infecting countless agents with its symbiote. Alerted to the situation, Spider-Man arrives to stop Carnage, eventually facing the symbiote and its spawns in its nest, where he is able to defeat Carnage with the aid of S.H.I.E.L.D.'s Spider-Slayers and separate it from the Tablet fragment.
- The Cletus Kasady incarnation of Carnage appears as a playable character in Marvel Super Hero Squad Online.
- The Cletus Kasady incarnation of Carnage appears as a boss in Marvel Avengers Alliance.
- The Cletus Kasady incarnation of Carnage appears as a team-up character in Marvel Heroes.
- The Cletus Kasady incarnation of Carnage appears as a playable character in Marvel Puzzle Quest.
- The Cletus Kasady incarnation of Carnage appears as a playable character in Lego Marvel Super Heroes.
- The Cletus Kasady incarnation of Carnage appears as the final boss of The Amazing Spider-Man 2 (2014), voiced by David Agranov. This version of the Carnage symbiote, code-named "Venom", was a set of nanite-based regenerating armor created by Oscorp as a means of curing Norman Osborn.
- The Carnage symbiote, via Cletus Kasady as Carnage, Ben Reilly as Spider-Carnage, Karl Malus as Superior Carnage, Norman Osborn as the Red Goblin, and the Venomverse incarnation of Carnage, all appear as playable characters in Spider-Man Unlimited (2014). Additionally, Kasady / Carnage serves as a boss in the "Symbiote Dimension" limited-time event.
- The Cletus Kasady incarnation of Carnage appears as a playable character in Marvel: Contest of Champions.
- The Cletus Kasady incarnation of Carnage appears as a playable character in Marvel: Future Fight.
- The Cletus Kasady incarnation of Carnage appears as a playable character in Lego Marvel Super Heroes 2. During the game, Green Goblin 2099 uses a shard of the Nexus of All Realities to fuse Venom and Carnage into a new creature he can control that Spider-Man dubs "Carnom".
- The Cletus Kasady incarnation of Carnage appears as a playable character in Marvel Strike Force.
- The Cletus Kasady incarnation of Carnage, along with Carnage-themed cosmetics, appear in Fortnite as part of a tie-in update for Venom: Let There Be Carnage.
- The Carnage symbiote appears in Marvel Snap.
- The Cletus Kasady incarnation of Carnage appears as a playable character in Marvel Tokon: Fighting Souls, voiced by Kellen Goff in English and by Kosuke Okano in Japanese.

=== Miscellaneous ===
- The comedy rock group Green Jellÿ released a song called "Carnage Rules" for their album 333, which focuses on Carnage. It would later be used as the theme song for the video game Spider-Man and Venom: Maximum Carnage in 1994.
- During the 2002 Halloween Horror Nights, Universal Orlando's Islands of Adventure featured a haunted maze entitled "Maximum Carnage". The maze was designed to be a trip through Carnage's hideout and contained all of his henchmen and the bloody remains of various Marvel superheroes. The house was located at Marvel Super Hero Island under the scare zone "Island Under Siege". Carnage was also the icon chosen to represent that specific island for the event, as he killed all of the superheroes and took over the "island", allowing criminals, gangbangers, and villains to roam free with no regard for law and order. The event's main icon, "The Caretaker", chose him based on his disregard for life and desire to see total chaos.
- The Cletus Kasady incarnation of Carnage appears in Spider-Man: Turn Off the Dark, played by Collin Baja. This version was an Oscorp scientist before the Green Goblin manipulated him into becoming a member of his Sinister Six.

== Collected editions ==
=== Omnibus ===
Title	Material collected	Publication date	ISBN
Carnage Omnibus	Venom vs. Carnage #1–4, Carnage (vol. 1) #1–5, Carnage U.S.A. #1–5, Minimum Carnage: Alpha and Omega, Scarlet Spider (vol. 2) #10–11, Venom (vol. 2) #26–27, Superior Carnage #1–5 and Annual #1, Deadpool vs. Carnage #1–4, Axis: Carnage #1–3, Nova (vol. 5) #26–27, Carnage (vol. 2) #1–16 and material from All-New, All-Different Point One.	April 2018	978-1302912277
Absolute Carnage Omnibus	Absolute Carnage #1–5, Absolute Carnage vs. Deadpool #1–3, Absolute Carnage: Captain Marvel #1, Absolute Carnage: Immortal Hulk #1, Absolute Carnage: Symbiote Spider- Man #1, Absolute Carnage: Symbiote Of Vengeance #1, Absolute Carnage: Lethal Protectors #1–3, Absolute Carnage: Avengers #1, Absolute Carnage: Miles Morales #1–3, Absolute Carnage: Weapon Plus #1, Absolute Carnage: Scream #1–3, Absolute Carnage: Separation Anxiety #1, Amazing Spider-Man (vol. 5) #29–31, Venom (vol. 4) #16–20, and Absolute Carnage Stinger Pages	September 2020	978-1302925291

=== Epic Collection ===
Title	Material collected	Publication date	ISBN
Carnage Epic Collection: Born in Blood	Amazing Spider-Man #361–363 and #378–380, Web of Spider-Man #101–103, Spider-Man #35–37, Spectacular Spider-Man #201–203 and material from Spider-Man Unlimited #1–2 and Amazing Spider-Man Annual #28	March 2022	978-1302946623
Carnage Epic Collection: Web of Carnage	Amazing Spider-Man #403, 410; Venom: Carnage Unleashed #1–4; Carnage: Mind Bomb #1; Sensational Spider-Man #3; Spider-Man (vol. 1) #67; Spectacular Spider-Man #233; Carnage: It's a Wonderful Life #1; Venom: On Trial #2–3; and material from material from Amazing Spider-Man Super Special, Spider-Man Super Special, Venom Super Special, Spectacular Spider-Man Super Special and Web of Spider-Man Super Special	March 2023	978-1302951092
Carnage Epic Collection: The Monster Inside	Amazing Spider-Man #430–431, Peter Parker: Spider-Man #13, Webspinners: Tales of Spider-Man #13–14, Venom vs. Carnage #1–4, Toxin #1–6, X-Men/Spider-Man #3 and What If? (vol. 2) #108	March 2024	978-1302956363

=== Modern Era Epic Collection ===
Title	Material collected	Publication date	ISBN
Carnage Modern Era Epic Collection: Carnage, U.S.A.	Carnage (vol. 1) #1–5, Carnage, U.S.A. #1–5, Minimum Carnage: Alpha #1, Scarlet Spider (vol. 2) #10–11, Venom (vol. 2) #26–27, Minimum Carnage: Omega #1, Superior Carnage #1–5	September 2025	978-1302965846
Carnage Modern Era Epic Collection: Prophecy of the Darkhold	Superior Carnage Annual #1, Deadpool vs. Carnage #1–4, AXIS: Carnage #1–3, Nova (vol. 5) #26–27, Carnage (vol. 2) #1–5 and material from All-New, All-Different Point One	October 2026	978-1302970031

=== Complete Collections ===
Title	Material collected	Publication date	ISBN
Venom: Carnage Unleashed	Venom: Carnage Unleashed #1–4, Venom: Sinner Takes All #1–5; and material from Amazing Spider-Man Super Special, Spider-Man Super Special, Venom Super Special, Spectacular Spider-Man Super Special and Web of Spider-Man Super Special	November 2017	978-1302907969
Carnage Classic	Amazing Spider-Man #361–363, 410, 430–431, Venom: Carnage Unleashed #1–4, Carnage: Mind Bomb #1, Carnage: It's A Wonderful Life #1, Sensational Spider-Man #3, Spider-Man #67, Spectacular Spider-Man #233, Peter Parker: Spider-Man #13, Webspinners: Tales of Spider-Man #13–14 and material from Amazing Spider-Man Annual #28	July 2016	978-1302900595

=== Carnage Vol. 2 ===
Title	Material collected	Publication date	ISBN
Carnage Vol. 1: The One That Got Away	Carnage (vol. 2) #1–5 and All-New, All-Different Point One (Carnage story)	May 2016	978-0785196341
Carnage Vol. 2: World Tour	Carnage (vol. 2) #6–10	November 2016	978-0785196358
Carnage Vol. 3: What Dwells Beneath	Carnage (vol. 2) #11–16	May 2017	978-1302902964

=== Carnage Vol. 3 ===
Title	Material collected	Publication date	ISBN
Carnage Vol. 1: In the Court of Crimson	Carnage (vol. 3) #1–5 and Carnage Forever #1	September 2022	978-1302934606
Carnage Vol. 2: Carnage in Hell	Carnage (vol. 3) #6–12	May 2023	978-1302934613
Carnage Reigns	Carnage Reigns Alpha #1, Miles Morales: Spider-Man (vol. 2) #6–7, Carnage (vol. 3) #13–14, Red Goblin #5 and Carnage Reigns Omega #1	September 2023	978-1302954222

=== Carnage Vol. 4 ===
Title	Material collected	Publication date	ISBN
Carnage Vol. 1: Born Again	Carnage (vol. 4) #1–4	May 2024	978-1302956790
Carnage: Symbiosis Necrosis	Carnage (vol. 4) #5–8, Miles Morales: Spider-Man (vol. 2) #18–19	September 2024	978-1302956806

=== Eddie Brock: Carnage ===
Title	Material collected	Publication date	ISBN
Eddie Brock: Carnage Vol. 1: Killing Me	Eddie Brock: Carnage #1–5	October 7, 2025	978-1302962760
Eddie Brock: Carnage Vol. 2: The Killing Muse	Eddie Brock: Carnage #6–10	March 17, 2026	978-1302962777

=== Miniseries and one-shots ===
Title	Material collected	Publication date	ISBN
Venom vs. Carnage	Venom vs. Carnage #1–4	January 2021	978-1302928476
Carnage: Family Feud	Carnage (vol. 1) #1–5	March 2012	978-0785151135
Carnage, U.S.A.	Carnage, U.S.A. #1–5	March 2017	978-1302907419
Minimum Carnage	Minimum Carnage: Alpha and Omega, Scarlet Spider (vol. 2) #10–11, Venom (vol. 2) #26–27	January 2013	978-0785167266
Superior Carnage	Superior Carnage #1–5	January 2014	978-1846535673
Deadpool vs. Carnage	Deadpool vs. Carnage #1–4	September 2014	978-1846536137
AXIS: Carnage & Hobgoblin	AXIS: Carnage #1–3 and AXIS: Hobgoblin #1–3	March 2015	978-0785193111
Venom Unleashed	Web of Venom: Carnage Born #1, Web of Venom: Ve'Nam #1, Web of Venom: Venom Unleashed #1, Web of Venom: Funeral Pyre #1	September 2019	978-1302917234
Spider-Man: The Many Hosts Of Carnage	Amazing Spider-Man #361, 410, 431; Spider-Man #67; Spectacular Spider-Man #233; Carnage #3; Carnage U.S.A #1–5; Superior Carnage #3–5 and Annual #1; Amazing Spider-Man #798–800	September 2019	978-1302919641
Absolute Carnage	Absolute Carnage #1–4	January 2020	978-1302919085
King in Black: Gwenom vs. Carnage	King In Black: Gwenom vs. Carnage #1–3, King in Black: Scream #1, King in Black: Spider-Man #1	August 2021	978-1302928117
Extreme Carnage	Extreme Carnage Alpha #1, Extreme Carnage: Scream #1, Extreme Carnage: Phage #1, Extreme Carnage: Riot #1, Extreme Carnage: Lasher #1, Extreme Carnage: Agony #1, Extreme Carnage: Toxin #1, Extreme Carnage Omega #1	February 2022	978-1302932077
Carnage: Black, White & Blood	Carnage: Black, White & Blood #1–4	March 2022	978-1302930158
Death of the Venomverse	Death of the Venomverse #1–5	December 2023	978-1302951993
