= Alternative versions of Captain America =

Alternate versions of Captain America
- Publisher: Marvel Comics
- First appearance: Captain America Comics #1 (December 1940)
- Created by: Joe Simon and Jack Kirby
- Characters: Primary continuity: Steve Rogers; Bucky Barnes; Jeffrey Mace; John Walker; Sam Wilson; William Burnside; William Naslund; Alternative continuities: American Dream; Captain America (Ultimate Marvel); Full list
- See also: Captain America in other media

Captain America is the alter ego of Steve Rogers, a superhero created by Joe Simon and Jack Kirby who appears in American comic books published by Marvel Comics. Multiple other characters have used the title of "Captain America" in Marvel's primary narrative continuity in addition to Steve Rogers. Additionally, alternate versions of Captain America exist in the parallel universes that compose the Marvel Comics Multiverse.

== Primary continuity (Earth-616) ==
=== Bob Russo, Scar Turpin, and Roscoe Simons ===
All three made one attempt to become Captain America when Steve Rogers quit.

Bob Russo is a professional baseball player. After he discovers that Captain America has retired, he decides he can do the job. On his first outing he swings into a building, breaks his arm, and quits.

Motorcycle thug Scar Turpin wants to be the next Captain America. On his first outing, he takes on a gang of six. He gets beat up badly and quits.

Roscoe Simons manages the gym where Steve Rogers trains. After Steve quits as Captain America, Simons tries to find Steve to see if he wil train him as the new Captain America; not actually knowing that Steve was Captain America. Falcon agrees to give Simons some training, but actually hopes he will quit. On his first mission, Simons is captured by the Red Skull, who kills him for being an imposter of his greatest foe. Simons's death convinces Steve to give up his Nomad persona and return as Captain America.

=== Isaiah Bradley ===
The 2003 limited series Truth: Red, White & Black introduced Isaiah Bradley as an African-American man who was used as a test subject during World War II in American government experiments that attempted to re-create the Super-Soldier Serum. In defiance of the government, he traveled to Europe to fight in the war.

=== Bucky Barnes ===
Steve Rogers' longtime partner Bucky Barnes assumed the role of Captain America following Steve Rogers' death in the 2007 storyline "The Death of Captain America".

=== David Rickford ===
Ex-special forces soldier Dave Rickford was augmented by the Power Broker and Karl Malus. After Steve becomes the head of S.H.I.E.L.D., and Bucky finds himself in legal trouble, Rickford takes up the mantle. On his first day he is captured by A.I.M., and rescued by Steve Rogers, who convinces him to quit as Captain America. Rickford argues that the world still needs a Captain America.

=== Sam Wilson ===
As part of Marvel's 2012 rebranding initiative Marvel Now!, Rogers' partner Sam Wilson (The Falcon) took over the mantle of Captain America. Series editor Tom Brevoort said, "While Sam shares many of Steve's beliefs in a general sense, he's also a very different person with a very different background. He didn't grow up in the 1930s, he's a modern day man in touch with the problems of the 21st Century. For most of his professional life, Sam has worked as a social worker, so he's seen the worst of urban society up close, and how crime, poverty, lack of social structure and opportunity can affect the community."

=== "The United States of Captain America" ===
The 2021 limited series The United States of Captain America introduced four costumed individuals who independently use the moniker of Captain America:

==== Aaron Fischer ====
Aaron Fischer is the "Captain America of the Railways" who is the first LGBTQ character to hold the title of Captain America. Fischer is one of the main characters in the series Avengers Academy: Marvel's Voices (2024–2025), in which he attends the eponymous school.

==== Nichelle Wright ====
Nichelle Wright is the "Captain America of Harrisburg".

==== Joe Gomez ====
Joe Gomez is the "Captain America of the Kickapoo Tribe".

==== Arielle Agbayani ====
Arielle Agbayani is the "Campus Captain America".

=== David Colton ===
Following the conclusion of the eleventh volume of Captain America in February 2025, a new Captain America run written by Chip Zdarsky was launched on July 2, 2025. Zdarsky's run introduces David Colton, who was billed by Zdarsky as a U.S. sponsored Captain America created in a post-9/11 world. In the 2026 storyline Avengers: Armageddon, Colton is empowered by an Origin Box and becomes Miracleman.

== Alternative continuities ==
=== Age of Ultron ===
In the Age of Ultron story wherein Ultron takes over the world, Captain America is one of the few surviving heroes. He is a shattered hero whose spirit is gone and shield is broken. He and the remaining heroes are tasked with coming up with a plan to stop Ultron, which takes them to the Savage Land. Captain America travels to the future with Iron Man, Nick Fury, Red Hulk, Storm and Quicksilver in an attempt to stop Ultron with the use of Doctor Doom's time platform, but is ambushed by Ultron drones and killed.

=== Age of X ===
In the Age of X reality, Steve Rogers is the leader of the Avengers, here a strike team intended to hunt down mutants. Although he initially believed in his mission to contain the danger that mutants could pose to the world, an encounter with a mutant 'nursery' protecting young children forced Rogers to recognize that he was on the wrong side, he and his team subsequently sacrificing themselves to stop the psychotic Hulk from launching a bioweapon at the mutant stronghold. Rogers' memories are 'stored' by Legacy, a mutant who was able to convey his plan of using various mutants to generate force fields around the facility to cut it off from the outside world.

=== Amalgam Comics ===
In the Amalgam Comics universe, Captain America is combined with DC's Superman to create Super-Soldier. In this reality, Clark Kent is given a Super-Soldier serum created from DNA harvested from Kal-El's corpse. The serum gives him the powers of the main universe Superman. Frozen in ice after a battle with Ultra-Metallo at the end of World War II, Super-Soldier is revived decades later and continues his fight for justice.

=== Avataars ===
In Avataars: Covenant of the Shield, Earth's version of Captain America is Captain Avalon. He is the leader of the Champions of the Realm and the King of Avalon.

=== Bullet Points ===
The five-issue limited series Bullet Points, written by J. Michael Straczynski and illustrated by Tommy Lee Edwards, tells of an alternative reality in which Abraham Erskine is killed the day before implementing the Captain America program. Steve Rogers, still frail, volunteers for the 'Iron Man' program, which bonds him to a robotic weapons-suit. He uses this to achieve victories against the Axis. Years after the end of the war, Rogers is killed in a battle with Peter Parker, who is the Hulk of that reality.

=== Captain America Corps ===
A future incarnation of Captain America, known as Commander A, is a major character in the Captain America Corps limited series, and is stated to be of mixed Japanese, African-American, Latino, and Native American descent. He is also implied to be a descendant of Luke Cage. Commander A wields two energy force-field shields, similar to the one that Steve Rogers used once when he temporarily lost his vibranium shield.

=== Captain Colonies ===
A member of the Captain Britain Corps, Captain Colonies (Stephen Rogers) appears in Excalibur #44. His name, combined with his membership in the Captain Britain Corps imply that in his universe, the Thirteen Colonies never gained independence from Britain.

=== Cellblock Steve ===
The series Avengers: Forever introduces holding numerous alternate versions of Steve Rogers, who are being held in the same prison. The group is later recruited by other versions of Captain America to combat the Masters of Evil.

=== Civil War ===
The Battleworld domain of the Warzone seen in the 2015 series Secret Wars contains a world in which Civil War never ended where it did in the original comics and continued for six more years. Captain America runs the west side of the United States, called the Blue.

=== DC vs. Marvel ===
Captain America appears in the Marvel/DC crossover DC vs. Marvel. He first appears fighting with Hydra before being summoned to the DC Earth. He is later shown in a brawl with Bane, winning when he throws his shield so that it strikes Bane in the back of the head before Bane can break his back. He is then seen fighting with Batman in the sewers of Manhattan. After a pitched hand-to-hand standoff, they realize that neither one of them can gain an advantage over the other. Afterward, they team up with each other to stop the entities, the fundamental similarities between the two unique men who trained themselves to the peak of human development—and their lack of interest in 'proving' their superiority over their counterpart forcing the Brothers to halt their conflict.

=== Deadpool: Samurai (Earth-346) ===
In the manga series Deadpool: Samurai, which takes place on Earth-346, Deadpool travels to Japan and joins Samurai Squad, the Japanese division of the Avengers. While he is a member of Samurai Squad, Deadpool receives briefings from Captain America in Japan about his mission objectives.

=== Earth-398 ===
In Morgan le Fay's reality of Earth-398, there is a version of Captain America called Yeoman America who operates as a knight. Yeoman America is among the versions of Captain America recruited to combat the Masters of Evil.

=== Earth-666 ===
On Earth-666 which is inhabited by monsters like mummies, vampires, and werewolves, a version of Captain America is a werewolf. A similar story arc, "Man and Wolf", saw Earth-616's Captain America turned into a werewolf. (Note: As seen in Captain America #405-408.) He goes by the name of Cap-Wolf and is a member of this world's version of the Avengers.

Cap-Wolf is among the versions of Captain America recruited to combat the Masters of Evil.

=== Earth-61311 ===
The storyline "Secret Empire" introduces a version of Captain America from Earth-61311, (Note: Earth-61311 was designated in Spider-Geddon Handbook #1.) an alternate universe created by Kobik altering reality. In this universe, Steve Rogers has been a double agent of Hydra since his early youth. In "Secret Empire", Rogers is the head of S.H.I.E.L.D, using a subsequent alien invasion and a mass supervillain assault to control the United States. While Rick Jones uses the Cosmic Cube to help the remaining Avengers, the true Steve Rogers survives within the Cosmic Cube. He is able to mostly reassemble the Cosmic Cube, but Falcon and the Winter Soldier use a fragment to restore his true counterpart to defeat his Hydra self, subsequently using the Cosmic Cube to undo most of Hydra's damage. The alternate Rogers continues to exist as a separate entity from the original Captain America and is held in Shadow Pillar, where he is the only inmate.

Hydra Supreme later receives a pardon from the President of the United States on the Power Elite's suggestion. However, he is ambushed and killed by Selene when leaving Shadow Pillar. Hydra Supreme is resurrected by Orchis and steals the Captain Krakoa armor. After being defeated, Hydra Supreme begins using the name Grant Rogers, using his middle name to distinguish himself from his Earth-616 counterpart.

=== Earth X ===
In the 1999 Earth X series, in a post-apocalyptic alternative present, Captain America is a war-worn hero, with a bald head, a ragged United States flag for a top and an A-shaped scar on his face, but still holding on to his shield and well-built. In the Universe X: Cap one-shot comic, he sacrifices himself to save the reborn Mar-Vell. Captain America later returns in an angel-like form with blue skin.

=== Elseworlds ===
Captain America and his sidekick Bucky appear in Batman and Captain America, a 1996 title that is part of the DC Comics Elseworlds series. The story is set in an alternative World War II, with Captain America and Bucky meeting Batman and Robin in the course of a mission and working together as a result. The two heroes' principal archvillains, the Red Skull and the Joker, also work together to steal an American atomic bomb. When the Joker realizes that the Skull is actually a Nazi, he double-crosses him and causes the atomic bomb to be detonated prematurely, apparently killing the two villains. 20 years later, Dick Grayson and Bruce Wayne Jr. recover Captain America, who had been frozen in an iceberg.

=== Exiles ===
In the Exiles arc "A World Apart", Earth was conquered by Skrull forces in the nineteenth century. Captain America has become a gladiator known as the Captain, fighting for the Skrulls against other superhumans in contests. He is defeated by Mimic, who is disgusted at Captain America having become nothing but a puppet to the Skrulls rather than the symbol he should be.

In "Forever Avengers", the Exiles visit a timeline where Captain America was turned into a vampire by Baron Blood. He later turns the Avengers into vampires and becomes the new Vampire King. The now Cursed Avengers plan to turn New York's population into zombies, but their plans are thwarted by the Exiles with the help of that Earth's Union Jack, Kenneth Crichton. One of the Exiles, Sunfire, is bitten by a vampire. Before she can completely turn, Baron Crichton destroys Captain America and reveals himself to be the grandnephew of the original Baron Blood and a vampire as well, and becomes the newest King of the Vampire by blood right.

=== House of M ===
In the altered world of House of M, Steve Rogers was not frozen in suspended animation and lived through World War II and the years afterward. Rogers became an astronaut and was the first man to walk on the Moon in 1956. By the present time, Rogers is said as being nearly 100 years old. His Earth-616 memories are not reactivated, to spare him from a severe mental shock.

=== Larval Earth ===
In Larval Earth (Earth-8311), a reality containing anthropomorphic animal versions of Marvel Comics characters, a character known as Captain Americat (Steve Mouser) exists. The character debuted in Marvel Tails Starring Peter Porker the Spectacular Spider-Ham #1 (August, 1983). Captain Americat makes a cameo appearance in the Ultimate Spider-Man episode "The Spider-Verse" Pt. 2.

=== Last Avengers Story ===
The two-issue limited series The Last Avengers Story (November–December 1995) tells of a possible alternative future for Captain America and the Avengers. Appalled with the American government after the "Villain Massacre", Captain America leaves his life as a superhero and runs for president. His presidency is a large success, but he is shot and seemingly killed in his third term, causing the other heroes to lose faith. Captain America is placed in suspended animation in a secret location until the technology to heal him can be developed. Using a sophisticated series of computer monitors, Captain America watches his friends win their final battle and records it for historical purposes.

=== Little Marvel ===
Two younger versions of Captain America were created by writer/artist Skottie Young. The first appears in the 2015 Secret Wars tie-in, Giant Size Little Marvel, written and illustrated by Young. In the Battleworld town of Marville, the mainstream superheroes are all children who engage in destructive roughhousing. This Captain America is still the leader of the Avengers, though their headquarters are in a tree house instead of Avengers Mansion. As in the mainstream "Avengers vs. X-Men" storyline, Captain America faces off against Cyclops and the X-Men, only this time in an attempt to get two new kids on the block to join their respective group.

An even younger version of Captain America appears in A-Babies vs X-Babies, a 2012 Skottie Young scripted story, illustrated by Gurihiru. In this story, Captain America and his fellow superheroes are all babies, but still superpowered. When baby Captain America's favorite stuffed bear Bucky goes missing, he assembles his baby Avengers and battles the baby X-Men for its return. This issue and the four Giant Size Little Marvel issues were collected into the Giant Size Little Marvel 2016 trade edition (ISBN 978-0785198703). The young Captain America is among the versions of Captain America recruited to combat the Masters of Evil.

=== Marvel 1602 ===
The Marvel 1602 limited series presents an alternative history, Earth-311, in which a Captain America from the late 21st century is transported to the year 1602 after the Purple Man takes over the world – his enemy wanting to dispose of Rogers in such a way that there is nothing left of him in the present to inspire others – where he assumes the identity of Rojhaz a white Native American who is presumed by the Europeans to be of Welsh ancestry. His arrival causes numerous alterations in reality, causing analogues of various Marvel Universe characters to appear in the 17th century instead, speculated by Uatu to be the result of the universe attempting to generate a means of repairing the damage caused to reality. Rogers refuses to return to the future because he wants to nurture a new United States free of prejudice from its very beginnings, but the 1602 version of Nick Fury forces him to return, accompanying him on the journey. Rogers noted that in his version of the late 21st century, he was the last true superhero and was left alone fighting his own country – the United States – which had fallen under the rule of a tyrannical life-term President.

=== Marvel 1872 ===
1872 is a Marvel miniseries during the Secret Wars comics featuring characters in a Western-style adventure in the small boom town of Timely. A dam constructed for mining projects is diverting water away from nearby native territories, so Red Wolf attempts to blow it up. Sheriff Steve Rogers prevents the corrupt Mayor Fisk (Kingpin) from having him killed, in order to give him a fair trial. However, as Rogers goes to help his friend Tony Stark (Iron Man) from being attacked, Red Wolf is taken and Rogers kills more of Fisk's men, further angering the mayor. Red Wolf is denied a trial, and Fisk's team of assassins, including Elektra, Grizzly, Bullseye, and Otto Octavius, are sent to kill them both. Sheriff Rogers, having Bullseye at gunpoint, attempts to rally the people of Timely into taking back their government, but is distracted and then shot by Bullseye, thrown into a pig pen by Fisk to die.

Red Wolf, taking up the role of Sheriff, Widow Barnes (Black Widow), Doctor Banner (Hulk), Carol Danvers (Captain Marvel) and Tony Stark join to get rid of the dam, as well as avenge Steve Rogers, and they succeed in both with Banner sacrificing himself to blow up the dam, and Widow Barnes killing Fisk. The remaining characters become Sheriff Roger's Avengers, protecting the town of Timely.

=== Marvel 2099 ===
In Marvel 2099, a man masquerading as the original Captain America became ruler of the U.S. after a successful coup deposed Doom 2099. The man was killed when Doom 2099 dropped nano-machines on the Red House. The real Captain America appears in 2099: Manifest Destiny and takes up the role of Thor before giving Mjolnir to Spider-Man 2099.

In Secret Wars, a new version of Captain America was created by Alchemax and resides in the Battleworld domain of 2099. Roberta Mendez was forcefully subjected to take the Super-Soldier Serum by her husband, Harry and became the leader of Alchemax's Avengers. Roberta and Captain America are two different personas of the same woman, with Roberta unknowing of her counterpart. She physically and mentally becomes Captain America if her trigger words, "Avengers Assemble", are said, and she reverts to Roberta if someone says "Dismissed".

Following Secret Wars, an unidentified 2099 reality version of Roberta is transported to the prime Marvel Universe with hallucinations of her past life. She was a supporting character in the All-New, All-Different Marvel Spider-Man 2099 comic, where she was an employee at Parker Industries with Miguel O'Hara as her boss.

In the unified 2099 reality of Earth-2099, Roberta Mendez appears as a member of the 2099 version of the New Avengers after the Avengers are killed by the Masters of Evil.

=== Marvel Apes ===
In the Marvel Apes Universe, a version of Captain America called Captain Ape-Merica leads the Ape-vengers. Secretly, he is a vampire along with his version of the Invaders, and plots to enter the 616 universe for sustenance. To accomplish this, he has already killed his world's version of Mister Fantastic. The vampire Captain Ape-Merica is really Baron Blood, who disguised himself as Captain America and increases his strength through the Super-Soldier Serum. The real Captain Ape-Merica was still frozen in ice up to the modern era, and helped fight off the vampire Namor. The real Captain Ape-Merica turns out to be nearly as brutal as his impersonator; for example he is willing to kill Spider-Monkey for the 'crime' of helping innocent dimensional travelers.

Captain Ape-Merica is among the versions of Captain America recruited to combat the Masters of Evil.

=== Marvel Comics 2 ===
In the alternative reality MC2 universe, Captain America leads the original Avengers on a mission to an alternative reality, which claims the majority of the team. He stays behind to aid the rebels in that reality, thus adding to the list of the dead or missing in action. The next iteration of MC2 Avengers aids him in A-Next #10-11, at the end of which he gives American Dream the shield that had belonged to that universe's Captain America. Captain America and Thunderstrike return to their home universe to aid in the fight against Seth

In the 2005 limited series Last Hero Standing, the MC2 Captain America is fatally injured leading a group of young heroes in battle against the Norse god Loki. Thor uses his power to transform Captain America into a new star. In the sequel, Last Planet Standing, Galactus states that this new star is the key to his escaping his world-devouring hunger.

=== Marvel Mangaverse ===
In the Marvel Mangaverse, Steve Rogers is both leader of the Avengers and the President of the United States. When he is killed by Doctor Doom, the mantle of Captain America is assumed by Carol Danvers.

=== Marvel Zombies ===
In the 2005–2006 miniseries Marvel Zombies, and the follow-up 2007 Marvel Zombies vs. The Army of Darkness, Captain America is known as Colonel America and once served as the President of the United States. He is among the superheroes infected, along with his other fellow Avengers, by the zombified Sentry. Colonel America is responsible for infecting Spider-Man in Marvel Zombies vs. The Army Of Darkness by biting him on the shoulder. He is apparently killed by Red Skull, who rips off his left arm and removes most of his brain before he himself is decapitated by a zombified Spider-Man. Ant-Man then steps on the Red Skull. As his intellect was partly retained in the remaining portion of his brain, he was transplanted into Black Panther's son T'Channa's dead body, and given a mechanical left arm. The transplant is successful, but the resulting brain damage turns Colonel America into a battle-crazed zombie leader, manageable but unable to focus on anything that is not related to war, confrontation, and battle. Colonel America (Steve Rogers/T'Channa) also has a role in Marvel Zombies Return, where he was transported to Earth-Z.

Marvel Zombies 3 features a zombie version called "Captain Mexica", who comes from an alternate universe in which the Aztec Empire in Mexico never fell. He is killed after Machine Man cuts him in half.

=== Mutant X ===
In the Mutant X universe, a mutant succeeds Rogers as Captain America, joining Havok's team of superheroes, "The Six", in order to protect mutants from a deranged Nick Fury and S.H.I.E.L.D. He has powerful energy manipulating abilities which manifest when America is threatened. Using that power he manages to kill a platoon of Super Soldiers and the Avengers, which consist of Black Widow, Deathlok, Typhoid Mary, Hawkeye and Iron Giant Man (Tony Stark). He is defeated by Havok and is then drawn below the earth by the Beyonder, who kills him after he finds out what he needs to know.

=== Old Man Logan ===
In Old Man Logan, all the Marvel Universe superheroes were killed when the supervillains combined forces. The villains then conquer and divide up control of the United States. Captain America is shown in a flashback as having been killed by the Red Skull in the ruins of the U.S. Capitol. The Red Skull subsequently takes Captain America's costume and wears it as President of America.

=== Revolutionary War Era ===
Captain Steven Rogers was the 18th century ancestor of Earth-616 Steve Rogers. He fought in the American Revolutionary War, wearing a colorful costume and carried a round cast iron shield.

=== Ruins ===
Warren Ellis's Ruins limited series explored a version of the Marvel Universe where "everything went wrong". In this continuity, Captain America himself makes no physical appearance in the series aside from the cover for issue #1 and in a dream sequence in issue #2. He was a member of the Avengers, a revolutionary cell formed by Tony Stark bent on liberating California from the corrupt rule of President Charles Xavier, but along with many other members of the team, he is killed aboard the Quinjet. His shield is recovered by soldiers, who celebrate the deaths of the Avengers.

=== Spider-Gwen ===
Captain America is a S.H.I.E.L.D. agent on Earth-65, who apprehends Spider-Gwen during her battle with the Lizard (this reality's Peter Parker). This Captain America is an African American woman named Samantha Wilson, a genderbent version of Sam Wilson/Falcon. During the 1940s, Samantha volunteered for Project: Rebirth after other test subjects were shot and killed or badly injured by Nazis. She became trapped in an alternate dimension after seemingly sacrificing herself to stop Arnim Zola, but later managed to return home to find that 75 years had passed. Steve Rogers would go on to become a famous comic creator, who writes stories of Samantha's dimensional journeys that he saw in his dreams, which Sam confirmed as being accurate.

=== Spider-Island ===
In a retelling of Spider-Island as part of the "Secret Wars" storyline, Captain America and the other heroes are mutated into monster spiders and he is still the Spider Queen's "Spider King" in the Battleworld domain of Spider-Island. However, Agent Venom gives Captain America the Godstone and turns him into a Man-Wolf, releasing Steve from the Spider Queen's control. He uses his new form to fight for the resistance.

=== Spider-Man: Life Story ===
Spider-Man: Life Story takes place in an alternate continuity where characters naturally age after Peter Parker debuts as Spider-Man in 1962. In 1966, Captain America is pressured by the public to join the efforts in Vietnam and decides to go to see the conflict for himself. A year later, American soldiers label Captain America as a traitor when he decides to protect a Vietnamese village. By 1974, he is on the run, having gone rogue from the US to save lives on both sides of the conflict, and is seen in 1984 fighting in the Secret Wars. Captain America also gets himself involved in the Superhuman Civil War in the 2000s. In the 2010s, it is unknown if he is dead or in hiding after Doctor Doom took over the planet.

=== U.S.Avengers ===
In U.S.Avengers, Danielle Cage operates as Captain America in an alternate future where New York City has been flooded. She uses the magnetic components Steve once used on the shield in order to better control it, and has the abilities of both her parents. She first appears in Ultron Forever, and returns to the present as a member of the U.S.Avengers.

=== Ultimate Marvel ===
In addition to the WWII era hero, a 1960s version of Captain America (a.k.a. "Captain America of the Vietnam War") exists as an Ultimate Marvel Universe parallel to the William Burnside/Captain America of the 1950s, who succeeded Rogers in the role after he is accidentally frozen. The 1960s Captain America is in fact Frank Simpson, better known in the Earth-616 Marvel Universe as Nuke. As scientists were unable to recreate the Super-Soldier Serum, they used cybernetics and steroids to enhance Simpson, which eventually eroded his sanity.

In an alternate future of the Ultimate Universe, Scott Summers assumes the mantle of Captain America after Steve Rogers dies and leads a small team of X-Men to fight for mutant justice.

=== Ultimate Universe ===
An alternate universe version of Captain America appears in the Ultimate Universe imprint. This version was recovered from ice by Iron Lad and Doom, who intended to save him from being exploited by the Maker. Six months later, Iron Lad unthaws Captain America and briefs him on how the world had changed. Captain America goes on to work with the Ultimates, a superhero resistance network against the Maker's council.

=== What If? ===
Alternative versions of Steve Rogers are seen within several issues of the What If? series.

- In "What If Captain America and Bucky Had Both Survived World War Two?", Steve is able to hold onto the drone plane and deactivate the bomb, allowing both men to survive. Baron Zemo is shot by the Red Skull for failing to kill Captain America and Bucky, but it is later revealed that the Skull shot him with a weapon which put him to sleep for 20 years. Bucky and Cap continue to fight in the 1950s and 1960s against Communists, though Nick Fury is killed in the Korean War. In the mid-1960s, Bucky goes his own way. Contacted by President Lyndon Johnson, the aged Steve is offered the job as the head of the newly created S.H.I.E.L.D., but Steve declines and suggests Barnes instead. S.H.I.E.L.D. and Barnes battle Hydra, but fail to capture the Supreme Hydra. Joining Steve on one of his missions, the pair run into the Hulk and Rick Jones. Steve is knocked out, forcing Bucky to use Cap's shield and rescue Rick from the Hulk's rampage. Bucky decides to take on the role of Captain America, to which Steve agrees. Overhearing the conversation, Rick light-heartedly blackmails the two for the chance to be the new Bucky. Steve becomes the new leader of S.H.I.E.L.D. Tracking the final group of Hydra to an uncharted island, Steve and S.H.I.E.L.D. agent Sharon Carter team up with the new Cap and Bucky. The group infiltrate the island's volcano, which turns out to be fake and created as a hideaway for Hydra forces. The four are captured, and the Supreme Hydra is revealed to be Baron Zemo, who has not aged for 20 years due to the Red Skull's weapon. Believing that Captain America is still Rogers, he prepares to kill Bucky, but Rogers escapes and frees the others. A fierce battle ensues, resulting in Zemo and Bucky being killed.
- "What If...Captain America Fought in the Civil War?" features a continuum where Captain America lived during the American Civil War. In this universe, Steve Rogers is a corporal attached to a Northern regiment called the Redlegs, led by Colonel Buck "Bucky" Barnes. Rogers's first mission turns out to be an attack on a group of civilians, and he refuses to follow Barnes' orders. Barnes shoots Rogers, but only wounds him after Barnes is attacked by an eagle. Rogers passes out while trying to escape, and has visions of We-pi-ahk the Eagle-Chief. Waking, he is greeted by a black man, Private Wilson, who brought him back to an Indian reserve. Wilson believes Steve's vision of We-pi-ahk means he is destined to be the one that will bring union to all people. Wilson begins a mystical ceremony that he says will make Rogers "as you are on the inside, so shall you become on the outside." Barnes breaks into the hut as the ceremony is underway. Rogers is mystically given superhuman strength and a magical shield that can transform into an eagle, while Barnes' head is turned into a fleshless skull. Barnes orders his men to open fire and kill everyone in the camp, and Wilson is fatally shot. Before the troops can escape, Rogers appears as Captain America, and captures Barnes and his men. Thanks to Captain America's involvement, the Civil War ends earlier than in the mainline universe, and Abraham Lincoln is never assassinated. Rogers helps the South rebuild after the war, and suppresses the rise of the Ku Klux Klan. As a representative of the Indian people, he is able to prevent the Indian wars of 1870. Barnes, now known as the White Skull, forms a group even more dangerous than the K.K.K. The descendants of Rogers and Barnes continue to fight up to the present.
- In the 2006 What If Age of Apocalypse one shot, Captain America is the leader of the Defenders (this reality's version of the Avengers), alongside Logan (not bonded with any adamantium), Captain Britain (who uses Iron Man's armor), Brother Voodoo (this reality's Sorcerer Supreme, after Doctor Strange's death), Colossus, the Thing (who has a prosthetic arm), Molecule Man, Sauron, and Nate Summers. Captain America no longer wears a mask, and wields Thor's hammer, Mjolnir, along with his shield.
- "What If... Captain America Was Revived in 2099?" features a continuity where Steve's frozen body does not drift south towards the Avengers. Instead, his body remains frozen in the Arctic until 2099, where it is founded by an anti-pollution corporation known as Eco Central owned by Ravage. He meets other heroes from the era, who inform him that while the Heroic Age still happened, it ended in 2006 as a result of the Civil War (this time between Thor and Iron Man). The heroes are attempting to rise up against Alchemax Stark-Fujikawa, a corporation that's been controlling the United States for years. Their authoritarian rule includes strict curfews and labeling anyone with minor genetic anomalies as a mutant and arresting them. Steve agrees to lead their revolution against the corporate overlords as Captain America 2099. After they inspire the people and suffer several casualties, Steve confronts the CEO of Alchemax Stark-Fujikawa and President of the United States, George Maxon. Maxon reveals himself to be Red Skull, and that he was elected to the office despite his past thanks to oligarchs that control the media. Steve defeats the Red Skull and then makes an impassioned speech to the people encouraging them to vote for a government that places their needs over corporate greed.

== Film, television, and games ==
=== Civil Warrior ===
The 2014 mobile game Marvel: Contest of Champions includes an exclusive version of Captain America named Civil Warrior. This version of Steve Rogers, who originates from an unnumbered universe, killed Tony Stark during the Civil War. Rogers then incorporated Stark's armor into his uniform, and uses a modified shield containing a version of the ARC reactor.
