= Fantastic Five =

Marvel Comics superhero team

- Cover to Fantastic Five #1. Art by Paul Ryan.

Publication information
- Publisher: Marvel Comics' MC2 imprint
- First appearance: What If #105 (February 1998)
- Created by: Tom DeFalco; Ron Frenz

In-story information
- Base(s): Baxter Building
- Member(s): Human Torch; Ms. Fantastic; Thing; Psi-Lord; Grim

Fantastic Five is a superhero team appearing in American comic books which were published by Marvel Comics. The team exists in the MC2 Universe, an alternate future to the Marvel Universe. A continuation of the Fantastic Four, the team was initially composed of the Human Torch, his wife Ms. Fantastic/Lyja (a Skrull), the Thing, Big Brain (Reed Richards' remote-controlled robotic body), and Psi-Lord (Franklin Richards, Sue and Reed's son).

== Fictional team biography ==
The Fantastic Five first appeared in What If #105 (February 1998), an issue that focused on Spider-Girl, the daughter of Spider-Man. Spider-Girl became popular and was given her own series, along with the other characters in the MC2 universe (including the Fantastic Five). The Fantastic Five's series lasted only five issues, but they remained recurring characters in the Spider-Girl title, which lasted for 100 issues in its first volume.

In the first series, "Big Brain" is a drone controlled from the Negative Zone, where Sue Storm is held in stasis, with her powers holding back a breach in reality. When this problem is corrected, Reed and Sue return to Earth.

The team also appears in Last Hero Standing and Last Planet Standing.

In Spider-Girl and Last Planet Standing, additional children of the original Fantastic Four are shown as members of the Fantastic Five, including Super-Storm (Torus Storm, son of Lyja and Johnny Storm, who possesses the powers of both parents), Grim (Jacob "Jake" Grimm, son of Ben Grimm, stuck in a rock-like form like his father), and Rad (Alyce Grimm, daughter of Ben Grimm, sister of Jacob, appears to have radiation-oriented powers, including flight). Doom, aka Kristoff Vernard, is also a member of the "young" Fantastic Five; he wears armor similar to Doctor Doom's.

A new Fantastic Five mini-series was published in 2007, after the success of two mini-series events set in the MC2 line. In this series, the titular characters battle Dr. Doom.

== Roster ==
=== Active ===
- Johnny Storm, the Human Torch - While Reed and Sue were in the Negative Zone, Johnny took command of the team. On their return, however, Johnny would clash with Reed over leadership techniques, even considering whether to form his own team.
- Ben Grimm, the Thing - Badly injured in a final battle with Terrax, Ben was outfitted with mechanical implants. His injured flesh has shown signs of regeneration.
- Lyja Storm, Ms. Fantastic - Johnny's wife, a member of the shape-shifting Skrull race.
- Franklin Richards, Psi-Lord - Son of Reed and Sue, and master of telepathy and telekinesis. After absorbing a large amount of cosmic radiation, his head now has the appearance of a glowing skull, and he must wear a helmet to protect others from the excess energies.
- Jacob Grimm, Grim - The son of Ben Grimm and Sharon Ventura, he is similar in appearance to his father, and also possesses his strength levels. He joins the F5 in Reed's absence.

=== Former ===
- Sue Storm, the Invisible Woman - Badly injured during a battle with Hyperstorm, she too was occupied in the Negative Zone until recently. She decides to remain in Latveria and care for her catatonic husband.
- Alyce Grimm, Rad - Jacob's sister, she is able to control and project cosmic radiation. She decides to forgo the superhero life and returns home with her mother Sharon Ventura.
- Torus Storm, Super-Storm - Johnny and Lyja's young son. Whilst he is not an actual member of the team, he insists on leaping into the fray whenever he can. He has his father's fire powers and his mother's shape-shifting abilities. In battle, he regularly takes the form of an older version of himself wearing an F5 uniform with a "6" on its chest.

== Other versions ==
- What If..? #1 is set in an alternative universe where Spider-Man joins the Fantastic Four (rather than leaving when he learns there isn't a salary, as happened in The Amazing Spider-Man #1), and they become the Fantastic Five. This universe is revisited in What If..? #21, by which time Susan Storm has left the team and chosen to marry Namor of Atlantis.
- What If..? (vol. 2) #27 showed Namor joining the Fantastic Four, briefly making it the Fantastic Five until Reed Richards left to found Richards Technology.
- In Exiles #44, the Weapon X team—led by Hyperion—began their conquest of the actual world they were on, by killing its superhero teams. At the beginning of the issue, they began killing the members of the Fantastic Five, which consisted of Mister Fantastic, the Invisible Woman, the Human Torch, the Thing, and Spider-Man as a fifth member.
- In Excalibur #51, the Fantastic Five was the Earth-99476 counterpart of the Fantastic Four, consisting of dinosaur versions of the Fantastic Four and Spider-Man.
- "The All New Fantastic Five?!?" also appears in Spider-Girl #87. Co-creator Tom DeFalco states that the new F5 were to appear in Fantastic Five #6 had the series continued.
- Fatal Five - Due to Seth's return to action, Spider-Girl and American Dream travel to an alternate universe that was last seen in A-Next #11 to recruit Thunderstrike. During their trip, they encounter an evil version of the Fantastic Five consisting of:
  - Reed Richards (he and that world's Baron Zemo first appeared in A-Next #10-11 as assistants to Victor von Doom)
  - Johnny Storm/Blow Torch
  - Ben Grimm/The Brute
  - Franklin Richards/Psi-Slayer
  - Peter Parker/The Spider

== Bibliography ==
- Fantastic Five #1–5 (October 1999 – February 2000)
- Last Hero Standing #1–5 (June – July 2005)
- Spider-Girl #86-88
- Last Planet Standing #1–5 (July – September 2006)
- Brief bios of Fantastic Five characters at Spider-Girl/MC2 fansite
- Fantastic Five (vol. 2) #1-5 (July 2007-November 2007)
