= Darkdevil =

Fictional superhero appearing in American comic books published by Marvel Comics

- Darkdevil as depicted in Darkdevil #1 (November 2000). Art by Ron Frenz.

Publication information
- Publisher: Marvel Comics
- First appearance: Spider-Girl #2 (November 1998)
- Created by: Tom DeFalco; Pat Olliffe

In-story information
- Alter ego: Reilly Tyne
- Species: Human mutate / Demon hybrid
- Team affiliations: New Warriors
- Notable aliases: Hornhead; Daredevil; Darkdevil
- Abilities: Superhuman strength, speed, and agility; Ability to create flaming constructs; Regenerative healing factor; Precognitive "Spider-Sense"; Wall-crawling; Teleportation

Darkdevil (Reilly Tyne) is a superhero appearing in American comic books published by Marvel Comics. Created by Tom DeFalco and Pat Olliffe, the character first appeared in Spider-Girl #2 (November 1998). Darkdevil primarily appears in the Marvel Comics 2 future of the Marvel Universe.

== Publication history ==
Darkdevil debuted in Spider-Girl #2 (November 1998), by writer Tom DeFalco and artist Pat Olliffe. He appeared in the 2000 Darkdevil series, his first solo comic book series. He appeared in the 2005 Last Hero Standing series.

== Fictional character biography ==
Reilly Tyne is the son of Ben Reilly (Spider-Man's clone) and Elizabeth Tyne. Before he reached his teens, his inherited powers manifest, causing his body to degenerate. Kaine, the first clone of Peter Parker, finds Reilly and places him within a regeneration tank to slow the degeneration process. Kaine attempts to resurrect Daredevil, who had previously died saving Kaine, and to heal Tyne. Kaine summons the demon Zarathos, which attempts to possess Tyne, but he is saved by the soul of Daredevil, who repels Zarathos. Part of Daredevil and Zarathos' souls to enter Reilly, giving him a demonic appearance. Through meditation and concentration, Reilly eventually learns to project a human appearance, but he now appears to be in his twenties, almost twice his actual age. Following in both of Daredevil's paths, he studies law and becomes an attorney, while taking on a costume bearing a resemblance to Daredevil's and using his demonic abilities to fight crime as Darkdevil.

Darkdevil has fought alongside Spider-Girl several times, as well as the semi-retired Spider-Man. Neither Spider-Man nor Spider-Girl are aware of his genetic relation to them, but Darkdevil has hinted that he owes his existence to the original Daredevil, Spider-Man, and Kaine. Mary Jane Watson notices Reilly at Normie Osborn and Brenda Drago's wedding party and attempts to point out to her husband the boy that resembled him. Peter Parker cluelessly mentions that Reilly resembles Tobey Maguire, a sly nod by writers to the fact that Maguire played Spider-Man in four films.

After the Spider-Verse event, Darkdevil was later seen with the New Warriors (and Uncle Ben/Spider-Man of Earth-3145) on helping Spider-Girl (now known as Spider-Woman) stopping Hope Pym/Red Queen and Entralla by freeing the mind-controlled A-Next.

== Powers and abilities ==
Darkdevil possesses abilities similar to Spider-Man, including superhuman physical abilities, a healing factor, and a precognitive "Spider-Sense". Due to possessing part of Zarathos' soul, he is also able to generate fire and teleport.

== Reception ==
=== Critical response ===
Darby Hart of Screen Rant included Darkdevil in their "9 Best Daredevil Variants From Marvel Comics" list.
