= Lyja =

Marvel Comics character

- Lyja as depicted in Secret Invasion: Fantastic Four #2 (August 2008). Art by Alan Davis and Mark Farmer.

Publication information
- Publisher: Marvel Comics
- First appearance: As Alicia Masters: Fantastic Four #265 (April 1984); As Lyja: Fantastic Four #357 (October 1991)
- Created by: Tom DeFalco (writer); Paul Ryan (artist)

In-story information
- Species: Skrull
- Team affiliations: Fantastic Four; Skrull Empire
- Notable aliases: Alicia Masters Storm; The Lazerfist; Bridget O'Neil; Laura Green; Invisible Woman
- Abilities: Shapeshifting; Energy blasts; Heat resistance; Force field creation

Lyja is a fictional character appearing in American comic books published by Marvel Comics. A Skrull, she possesses the ability to shapeshift into almost any humanoid or animal form. Modifications on her body give her the power to generate energy blasts.

== Publication history ==
Lyja the Laserfist first appeared in Fantastic Four #357 (Oct. 1991), and was created by Tom DeFalco and Paul Ryan. She was revealed to have been impersonating Alicia Masters ever since Fantastic Four #265 (April 1984). Lyja remained a supporting character in the series until the launch of the "Heroes Reborn" storyline in 1996. She returned in a tie-in to the Secret Invasion limited series in 2008.

== Fictional character biography ==
The Skrull Empire—longtime enemies of the Fantastic Four—embarked on a plan to infiltrate the team by impersonating Alicia Masters. The author of the plan, Paibok, selected the warrior Lyja to be the spy and espionage agent—possibly as retribution because they had once had a failed affair. Nevertheless, Lyja trained extensively to pull off the disguise, even using contact lenses to make herself blind in human form to learn how to navigate the world as Alicia did.

Soon after Lyja's arrival on Earth, a near-omnipotent being known as the Beyonder kidnapped numerous super-powered beings (including three members of the Fantastic Four), transporting them to a makeshift Battleworld, where they participated in a series of "Secret Wars" between the so-called forces of good and evil. Lyja took the opportunity of their distraction to replace Alicia, greeting the Fantastic Four on their return to Earth from Battleworld. The Skrull plan almost hit a snag when Lyja discovered that the Thing opted to remain on Battleworld at the end of the war, instead of returning home to Earth. Lyja instead seduced Johnny Storm, the Human Torch. When the Thing learned that Johnny and "Alicia" were lovers, they became estranged. Lyja fell in love with Johnny and eventually they were married under the false pretense of her as Alicia Masters.

Eventually Alicia's stepfather, the Puppet Master, realized that Alicia was an imposter, and took his suspicions to the Thing, who exposed her. She disclosed her true identity, as well as the fact that the Skrulls had imprisoned the real Alicia. She aided the Fantastic Four in finding the real Alicia Masters in the Skrull Empire, but was believed to be slain when she threw herself in the path of a blast which Paibok had meant for the Human Torch.

In actuality, Paibok recovered Lyja and revealed to Devos the Devastator that she was still alive. Paibok, with the assistance of Devos, awoke Lyja from her comatose state, and bestowed her with the power to fly and fire energy blasts from her hands becoming "Lyja the Lazerfist". These powers were later revealed to come from a special device implanted into her. Joining them in search of vengeance, the three arrived on Earth, and isolated and battled the Torch at Empire State University. Panicking, the Torch burst into his Nova Flame and destroyed the campus. Alongside Devos and Paibok, Lyja witnessed a battle between the Fantastic Four and an alternate Fantastic Four. Lyja still bore feelings for the Torch and once again betrayed her cohorts to side with the Four.

Lyja then first encountered Aron the Watcher, and aided the Fantastic Four against Doctor Doom. Alongside the Fantastic Four, Lyja battled Devos, Paibok, Klaw, and Huntara. Lyja impersonated Bridget O'Neil, and became jealous on discovering Johnny Storm's affection for Bridget.

After returning to the Fantastic Four and Johnny, Lyja claimed she was pregnant with Johnny's child. Over time, Lyja and Johnny began to grow close again. When Lyja delivered the "child" (an egg), the implant that gave her the "Lazerfist" powers was also removed, returning Lyja to an ordinary Skrull with no extra powers beyond her shapeshifting. The implant was subsequently absorbed by a normal human, apparently an electronics expert named Raphael Suarez, who gained the "Lazerfist" powers, and attempted to contact the Fantastic Four for their assistance but after the hectic events that followed the hatching of the "egg", Raphael wandered off, realizing the Fantastic Four were not going to be of any help in their current state, and has not been referenced since.

Although Lyja and Johnny were growing close, Lyja was continuously torn about telling Johnny something. She was too scared to risk shattering the bonds they had managed to form again, and kept putting it off. Ultimately, it was too late. The "egg" was revealed, not to be their child, but rather a Skrull bio-weapon, which Lyja subsequently destroyed after it hatched. Johnny, enraged at being betrayed and deceived again by Lyja, broke up with her again.

Lyja was still in love with Johnny and stalked him while as a human, Laura Green. Johnny was initially interested in a fellow college student but when he realized nothing was going to materialize with her his focus shifted to Laura/Lyja. Lyja, having learned her lessons well, eventually decided to reveal herself before Johnny felt betrayed again. After sharing a kiss with Laura, Johnny already knew that his ex-wife was in fact Laura Green. During the Onslaught crisis when Lyja was injured she attempted to tell Johnny the truth but he informed her that he already knew. The couple seemed to be on track to reconciling their relationship until the Fantastic Four were presumed dead after a devastating fight with Onslaught, and as a result, Lyja left to attempt a normal life, masquerading again as a human woman. Soon after the Fantastic Four's were revealed to have survived the fight with Onslaught, Johnny mentions that he can not locate Lyja.

=== Secret Invasion ===
During the Secret Invasion storyline, Lyja poses as the Invisible Woman to send the Baxter Building to the Negative Zone. She reveals herself to her former spouse and attacks him, angered that he had forgotten her. The two reconcile, but a Negative Zone creature attacks them, knocking Lyja unconscious. Some time later, when the "new" Fantastic Four fly off to the prison, Lyja rescues Franklin and Valeria Richards from Negative Zone creatures. She informs Johnny that she had been working in a book store when a Skrull approached her, insisting she join them. They attempted to convince her to help them destroy the Baxter Building, but instead she sends the Fantastic Four to the Negative Zone in an attempt to protect them. When Ben, Johnny, Franklin, Val and the Tinkerer were ready to leave the Negative Zone, she refused to leave, as she wanted to stay behind and find out who she really was.

=== Future Foundation ===
Lyja later assists the Future Foundation in locating Molecule Man's remnants. Having assumed the identity of Yondu Udonta to escape persecution for being a Skrull, she helped Foundation member Julie Power infiltrate a galactic prison where one of these remnants (which was attached to Rikki Barnes) was located. She later killed Kl'Rath, a Zn'rx ally of The Maker, for him having killed innocent Skrull children, impersonated him and helped in thwarting The Maker's plans. Upon Alex Power's invitation, she subsequently joined the Future Foundation.

== Powers and abilities ==
Lyja's Deviant Skrull heritage gives her the ability to change size, shape, and color at will, thus taking on any appearance, but not the characteristics of other beings or objects.

After receiving implants from Paibok, Lyja temporarily gained the ability to project laser-like beams from her hands and fly by using them as propulsion.

Lyja wears body armor of unspecified materials. She wore special contact lenses that rendered her blind while impersonating Alicia Masters.

Lyja had been trained in armed and unarmed combat, as well as acting. She was educated in Earth culture, history, and language by Skrull tutors. Lyja is a talented creator of abstract sculptures to avoid making representative ones.

In the Secret Invasion storyline, Lyja regains her energy projection abliities and gains the additional abilities of fire resistance and force field generation.

== Other versions ==
=== Marvel Zombies ===
A zombified alternate universe variant of Lyja from Earth-2149 appears in Black Panther (vol. 4). This version gained the Invisible Woman's powers following a failed attempt to recreate the Super-Skrull before being killed by Black Panther.

=== MC2 ===
An alternate universe variant of Lyja from Earth-982 who remained married to the Human Torch and joined the Fantastic Five appears in the MC2 universe.

=== Power Pack ===
An alternate universe variant of Lyja from Earth-5631 appears in Skrulls vs. Power Pack.

== In other media ==
Lyja appears in Fantastic Four, voiced by Katherine Moffat. This version is a commander of the Skrull Empire.
