= Kickers, Inc. =

Comic book series

- Cover to issue #1

Publication information
- Publisher: Marvel Comics
- Schedule: Monthly
- Format: Ongoing series
- Publication date: 1986-1987
- No. of issues: 12
- Main character(s): Kickers, Inc.

Creative team
- Created by: Tom DeFalco; Ron Frenz
- Written by: Tom DeFalco; Mary Jo Duffy; Ron Altaville; Terry Kavanagh; Mark Gruenwald; Dwight Zimmerman; Adam Blaustein; Howard Mackie
- Artist(s): Ron Frenz; Howard Bender; Paul Ryan; Rod Whigham; Larry Alexander; Alan Kupperberg

Kickers, Inc. is a twelve-issue comic book series published by Marvel Comics from 1986 to 1987 as part of the New Universe imprint. Created by Tom DeFalco and Ron Frenz, the series featured a group of former professional American football players for the fictional New York Smashers team who became a group of heroes for hire, calling themselves "Kickers Inc." They were led by Jack Magniconte, a Smashers player who gained super-human strength and endurance from a combination of exposure to radiation from the "White Event" and an experimental muscle-enhancing device.

== Publication history ==
Tom DeFalco and Ron Frenz created the series, then titled "Mr. Magnificent and his Team Supreme", for the New Universe line before the concept of the New Universe itself had been fleshed out. Frenz explained:

They were going to have a vehicle called the Ultramobile that could travel all-terrain and it was much more broad adventure, à lá the Challengers of the Unknown. As things started to form, there was more information about what the New Universe was going to be trickling down from [editor-in-chief Jim] Shooter. We found out Shooter was pushing this idea that the books would be ultra-realistic. Tom wanted to do very tongue-in-cheek, seat-of-your-pants adventures. The characters were going to be off-season football players, but he was seeing something much broader. When Tom saw that Shooter wanted things more grounded in realism, he tried to take the strip back. But Jim wanted a sports book. Tom tried to tell him it wasn't a sports book, but Shooter told Tom, 'Trust me, it'll be great. I want it for New Universe.'

DeFalco and Frenz modified the series according to the New Universe premise, but Kickers, Inc. still did not fit well within the New Universe's stated editorial goal of being more grounded in realism than the regular Marvel Comics Universe, its stories, characters and concepts being recognizably based on standard superhero tropes. The series also suffered from creative instability to an even greater extent than the rest of the 1986-87 New Universe lineup, with nearly every issue being produced by a different creative team. DeFalco himself lost interest early on; half of issue #3 and all of issues #4 and 5 were scripted by guest writers over DeFalco's plots, and by issue #6 neither he nor Frenz were involved with Kickers, Inc. at all. It was canceled with issue #12, along with other New Universe comics such as Nightmask and Merc, though Jack Magniconte continued to make occasional appearances in the remaining New Universe titles.

Tom DeFalco and Ron Frenz had previously teamed up on The Amazing Spider-Man and would later work together on Thor as well as DeFalco's MC2 titles.

== Writers ==
- Tom DeFalco - Kickers, Inc. #1-5 (November 1986-March 1987)
- Mary Jo Duffy - Kickers, Inc. #3 (January 1987)
- Ron Altaville - Kickers, Inc. #4, 6-8, 12 (February 1987, April 1987-June 1987, October 1987)
- Terry Kavanagh - Kickers, Inc. #4, 6-8, 12 (February 1987, April 1987-June 1987, October 1987)
- Mark Gruenwald - Kickers, Inc. #5 (March 1987)
- Dwight Zimmerman - Kickers, Inc. #9, 11 (July 1987, September 1987)
- Adam Blaustein - Kickers, Inc. #10 (August 1987)
- Howard Mackie - "Choices" in D.P. 7 #21 (May 1988) [Jack Magniconte back-up story]

== Art ==
- Ron Frenz - Kickers, Inc. #1-3 (November 1986-January 1987); "Choices" in D.P. 7 #21 (May 1988) [Jack Magniconte back-up story]
- Howard Bender - Kickers, Inc. #4 (February 1987)
- Paul Ryan - Kickers, Inc. #5 (March 1987)
- Rod Whigham - Kickers, Inc. #6-7, 10, 12 (April 1987-May 1987, August 1987, October 1987)
- Larry Alexander - Kickers, Inc. #8, 11 (June 1987, September 1987)
- Alan Kupperberg - Kickers, Inc. #9 (July 1987)

== See also ==
- NFL SuperPro
