= Last Hero Standing =

- Cover of the 1st issue

Publication information
- Publisher: Marvel Comics
- Schedule: Weekly
- Format: Limited series
- Genre: Superhero
- Publication date: August 2005
- No. of issues: 5
- Main character: Most MC2 heroes

Creative team
- Created by: Tom DeFalco; Pat Olliffe
- Written by: Tom DeFalco (plot and script); Pat Olliffe (plot)
- Penciller: Pat Olliffe
- Inker: Scott Koblish
- Letterer: Dave Sharpe
- Colorist: Rob Ro
- Editor(s): Tom Brevoort; Molly Lazer; Stephanie Moore; Joe Quesada

Collected editions
- Last Hero Standing: ISBN 0-7851-1823-3

Last Hero Standing is a 5-issue comic book limited series published by Marvel Comics in 2005. The series was written by Tom DeFalco and drawn by Pat Olliffe (who also co-plotted the series).

The series stars many characters from the MC2 universe, such as A-Next and the Fantastic Five. Although these characters existed prior to this miniseries, Marvel wished to reintroduce them to the public quickly following the success of Spider-Girl in digest size format. The series was released weekly and then reprinted as a trade paperback.

== Plot summary ==
While "joy-hunting" together in Canada, Wild Thing is shocked when her father Wolverine is kidnapped in front of her eyes. Elsewhere across the world, one of the Ladyhawk sisters is abducted as well. These events get the attention of the Watcher Uatu.

After the first appearances of the original Fantastic Four, and the defeat of Loki which caused the creation of the first group of Avengers, a new line of heroes have emerged in a possible future timeline. These heroes now form the groups of A-Next and the Fantastic Five (F5), while other heroes such as Spider-Girl, the Green Goblin, and Darkdevil remain solo.

Peter later discusses recent events with Phil Urich, alias Green Goblin. They are attacked by a gigantic robot which manages to abduct Peter. A panicking Phil contacts May about this. She, Buzz, the other Lady-hawk and the Green Goblin dive into a tunnel that was created by the robot that kidnapped Peter. There, they meet up with all the members of A-Next who discovered the same tunnel earlier.

Doctor Strange tries to gain the assistance of Doc Magus, but he prefers to work on his own. Doc Magus uses his astral form to scan the entire world for the missing heroes, which leads him to a dark cave. There, he is attacked by a dark entity that defeats and then kidnaps him as well.

At Avengers Compound, Captain America is exercising alone. Thunderstrike realizes Cap is feeling down because of his old age and promises him that he does not have to worry about it because A-Next will follow him anywhere. Cap and Thunderstrike are called to an A-Next meeting where they discuss possible villains who could be behind the kidnappings. They also inform the X-People of the situation, but Jubilee, their leader, decides that they work better on their own, causing J2 and Wild Thing to wonder why they ever bothered to try join the X-People; they are glad they decided to stay with A-Next. The team decides to split up to investigate the different possibilities.

Spider-Girl, Captain America and Thunderstrike learn about the kidnappings at Barton's Dojo. They jump into the hole together with J2 and Wild Thing and discover a portal. After entering it, the heroes are immediately attacked by robot-like creatures and start to fight them. Soon the mastermind villain reveals himself to be Loki. He wants revenge on the Avengers, realizing he helped create them years earlier, and shows that he holds the missing heroes prisoner in life-size crystals.

Vision returns to the Avengers Compound where he finds Stinger discussing matters with Jubilee, who promises to contact them when she learns anything new. Vision explains that he has arrived at the request of the President of the United States, G. W. Bridge, who believes that the kidnappings could threaten the nation. Edwin Jarvis arrives to inform the two that all of the missing heroes have mysteriously returned.

J2 and Spider-Girl return to the caves and set their teammates free. They later find Nova captured in the same crystals as before and set him free as well. Meanwhile, Loki has set up two sides of heroes against each other: the ones he kidnapped and turned evil against the unaffected heroes.

Spider-Girl's spider-sense warns her of a mysterious presence which she cannot see. Dormagus and the Vizier use their combined magic powers to make Loki reveal himself, and the heroes all fight each other. Captain America notices a gem hanging on Loki's neck, and smashes it with his shield. Once the gem is destroyed, his corrupting influence over the heroes is broken.

Loki attacks Captain America, mortally wounding him. Thor releases a blast from his hammer which will send Loki into Limbo, with Hulk joining Loki in Limbo to make sure that he does not escape. Captain America dies from his wounds, but Thor uses his hammer to preserve his soul. Captain America's soul floats into the skies, and creates a star in the shape of his shield.

== Collected editions ==
The limited series has been collected in a trade paperback:

- Last Hero Standing (120 pages, October 2005, ISBN 0-7851-1823-3)

== Aftermath ==
- This miniseries has two sequels:
  - In Spider-Girl #94–95, Ant-Man, Hawkeye, Vision and Scarlet Witch return to active duty and join A-Next.
  - A follow-up limited series, Last Planet Standing, was published the following year.
