= Eric Masterson =

Eric Masterson may refer to:

- Thunderstrike (Eric Masterson), a comic book superhero in the Marvel universe
- Eric Masterson (actor) (born 1970), adult film actor
