= American Dream (character) =

Comics character

- Art by Ron Frenz

Publication information
- Publisher: Marvel Comics
- First appearance: A-Next #1 (August 1998)
- Created by: Tom DeFalco; Brent Anderson

In-story information
- Alter ego: Shannon Carter
- Species: Human
- Place of origin: Earth-982
- Team affiliations: Dream Team; A-Next
- Abilities: Peak physical condition; Olympic level athlete; Skilled martial artist; Excellent aim; Carries an indestructible shield; Use of disc weapons

American Dream (Shannon Carter) is a superhero appearing in American comic books published by Marvel Comics. Created by writer Tom DeFalco and artist Brent Anderson, the character first appeared in A-Next #1 (August 1998). Shannon Carter comes from an alternative future timeline of the Marvel Universe known as the MC2 Universe. She wears a costume similar to that of the comic book superhero Steve Rogers / Captain America. Her weapons are throwing disks and the trademark shield.

== Publication history ==
American Dream debuted in A-Next #1 (August 1998), created by writer Tom DeFalco and artist Brent Anderson. She later appeared in the 2008 American Dream series, her first solo comic book series. She appeared in the 2011 Captain America Corps series.

== Fictional character biography ==
Shannon Carter as American Dream on the cover of A-Next #4 (1999). Artwork by Ron Frenz & Brett Breeding.

Shannon Carter is the cousin of S.H.I.E.L.D. agent Sharon Carter. She grew up idolizing Captain America. She is hired by Edwin Jarvis as a tour guide for the Avengers Headquarters, at the time functioning only as a museum. When the new Avengers team is formed, she is determined to join. She wears a costume based on Captain America's and carries on her arms disc weapons resembling miniature versions of his shield. Her strength and agility are honed by intensive physical training. After joining the team as the American Dream, Shannon soon proves herself to be an effective Avenger, and when the team saves the original Avengers from a dark parallel world, Captain America himself judges her worthy to wield the shield of the alternate Captain. She also proves to be an important character in defeating Galactus in the Last Planet Standing limited series. She, along with Stinger and Spider-Girl, take down Galactus from the inside. They survive the imminent explosion by shrinking to microscopic size.

Carter is the leader of the "Dream Team", consisting of herself, Bluestreak, Crimson Curse and Freebooter. All members of the Dream Team become members of the new Avengers team in A-Next #4. American Dream is also an ally of Spider-Girl, Earth Sentry, Blacklight, Coal Tiger, Argo and Captain America.

American Dream has fought against the Sons of the Serpent, Seth, the Revengers, Fatal Force and Loki. When Superia launches a cross-temporal attack to eliminate Steve Rogers' post-war career as Captain America and take his place herself, American Dream is one of five heirs to Rogers' legacy that were assembled by the Contemplator to thwart her plans, the others being Rogers early in his career, John Walker shortly after his own time as Cap, Bucky during his time as Captain America, and Commander A from the twenty-fifth century. She receives an invitation to join the newly established Avengers squad. She has designed a suit, made disc weapons that resembled miniaturized copies of Captain America's shield, and engaged in extensive physical training to become the strongest and most agile person on the planet.

== Powers and abilities ==
American Dream is in peak physical condition. She is a skilled martial artist and an Olympic level athlete.

She has disc weapons similar to Ricochet's and has a superb aim. She now also carries a version of Captain America's shield, which she uses both defensively and offensively to great effect. Her fighting skills are matched by her leadership ability.

== Reception ==
=== Critical response ===
Comic Book Resources ranked American Dream 10th in their "10 Most Muscular Women In Marvel Comics" list, 13th in their "8 Captain Americas Better Than Steve Rogers (And 7 Who Couldn't Handle It)" list, and 17th in their "Shield Of Dreams: The Very Best Captain Americas" list.

== Literary reception ==
=== Volumes ===
==== American Dream - 2008 ====
According to Diamond Comic Distributors, American Dream #1 sold out in May 2008. American Dream #1 was the 131st best selling comic book in May 2008. American Dream #2 was the 147th best selling comic book in May 2008.

== Other versions ==
=== Secret Wars ===
An alternative version of American Dream appears in the 2017 Secret Wars storyline. Ellie Rogers is the daughter of Steve Rogers and Sharon Carter in the Battleworld domain of the Hydra Empire. She is part of the Resistance when a group of female assassins and infected by Venom. Ellie escapes while most of the Resistance was killed and eventually turned into the symbiote-powered Viper, but uses these abilities to help Nomad.

== In other media ==
=== Video games ===
- Shannon Carter / American Dream appears as a playable character in Marvel Super Hero Squad Online, voiced by Tara Strong.
- Shannon Carter / American Dream appears as a female enhanced costume for Steve Rogers / Captain America in Marvel Heroes, voiced by Melissa Disney.
- Shannon Carter / American Dream appears as a playable character in Marvel: Future Fight. This version is named Sharon Rogers. As part of Captain America's 75th anniversary, she is the daughter of Steve Rogers and Peggy Carter from an alternate timeline where she now serves as Captain America.

== Collected editions ==
- American Dream: Beyond Courage. Marvel. 2008-10-15. ISBN 978-0-7851-3184-7.
