= Webspinners: Tales of Spider-Man =

- Cover to Webspinners: Tales of Spider-Man #1.

Publication information
- Publisher: Marvel Comics
- Schedule: Monthly
- Publication date: January 1999 – June 2000
- No. of issues: 18
- Main character: Spider-Man

Webspinners: Tales of Spider-Man is a comic book series starring Spider-Man published by Marvel Comics for 18 issues from January 1999 to June 2000.

== Publication history ==
Webspinners was created in 1999 after a consolidation of Marvel's Spider-Man comics line that saw cancellations and relaunches of the existing ongoing series. The title was conceived as a new anthology series that was divided into multi-issue story arcs, each of which featured a different creative team and told a story from a different part of Spider-Man's history. Writers for the series include creators new and old to the franchise such as J. M. DeMatteis, Keith Giffen, Joe Kelly, Paul Jenkins, Howard Mackie, Rurik Tyler, and Tom DeFalco.

The series was cancelled in June 2000, but would be replaced by successive releases of Spider-Man mini-series with similar concepts to the cancelled title that lasted until June 2001: Spider-Man: Death & Destiny, Spider-Man: Revenge of the Green Goblin, Spider-Man: Mysterio Manifesto, and Spider-Man: Lifeline.

== Creators ==
Issues	Writer(s)	Penciller(s)
1-3	J. M. DeMatteis	Michael Zulli
1 (backup)	J. M. DeMatteis	John Romita Sr.
4-6	Eric Stephenson	Keith Giffen (4-5); Andy Smith (6)
7-9	Joe Kelly	Bart Sears (7); Andy Smith (7-9)
10-12	Paul Jenkins	Sean Phillips (10-11); J. G. Jones (12)
13-14	Howard Mackie	Graham Nolan
15-16	Rurik Tyler	
17-18	Tom DeFalco; Ron Frenz	Ron Frenz

== Collected editions ==
- Spider-Man: Webspinners - The Complete Collection ISBN 978-1302906818 - Collects all 18 issues of Webspinners as well as material from Shadows & Light #2 & 3
- Peter Parker: Spider-Man - A Day in the Life ISBN 978-0785107774 - A collection of Peter Parker: Spider-Man issues written by Paul Jenkins which includes his Webspinners story in issues 10-12
- Carnage Classic ISBN 978-1302900595 - A collection of stories featuring Carnage including Webspinners #13-14
