= Untold Tales of Spider-Man =

Comic book series

- Cover to Untold Tales of Spider-Man #1, art by Pat Olliffe.

Publication information
- Publisher: Marvel Comics
- Schedule: Monthly
- Format: Ongoing
- Genre: Superhero
- Publication date: September 1995 – October 1997
- No. of issues: 26 (#1-22, -1 and 23-25), plus 2 Annuals, 1 one-shot issue and stories in Amazing Fantasy #16-18 and The Amazing Spider-Man Annual #37
- Main character: Spider-Man

Creative team
- Created by: Stan Lee; Steve Ditko
- Written by: Kurt Busiek
- Penciller: Pat Olliffe
- Inker(s): Al Vey; Al Williamson
- Colorist: Steve Mattsson

Untold Tales of Spider-Man is an American comic book series starring Spider-Man published by Marvel Comics between 1995 and 1997. It was published for 26 issues (#1–25, with a #-1 issue (July 1997) added between issues #22 (June 1997) and 23 (August 1997)) and two Annuals (Annual '96 and Annual '97) from September 1995 to October 1997. The series was preceded by three Spider-Man flashback stories in Amazing Fantasy #16-18 (December 1995-March 1996). In February 1999, a one-shot issue called Untold Tales of Spider-Man: Strange Encounter was published. Finally, The Amazing Spider-Man Annual #37 (2010) featured another interconnected story that ended the series.

The series was part of an experiment for Marvel, where they published a number of new titles for only 99 cents in the hopes that they would attract new, young readers who might have been put off by the then-U.S.$1.50/$1.95 standard prices for comic books at the time. Uniquely among those titles, Untold Tales of Spider-Man presented new stories set in the early days of Spider-Man's superhero career.

The series was primarily written by Kurt Busiek and penciled by Pat Olliffe, though Roger Stern, Tom DeFalco, Glenn Greenberg (writing under the pseudonym "G.L. Lawrence"), and Ron Frenz also contributed.

== Collected editions ==
| # | Title | Material collected | Released | Format | Pages | ISBN |
|---|---|---|---|---|---|---|
| | Untold Tales Of Spider-Man | Untold Tales of Spider-Man #1-8 | 16 Feb 1997 | TPB | 176 | 978-0785102632 |
| | Spider-Man Visionaries: Kurt Busiek Vol. 1 | Untold Tales of Spider-Man #1-8 | 2006 | TPB | 176 | 978-0785122043 |
| 1 | Untold Tales Of Spider-Man: The Complete Collection Vol. 1 | Amazing Fantasy (vol. 2) #16-18, Untold Tales of Spider-Man #1-14 | 23 Nov 2021 | TPB | 400 | 978-1302931773 |
| 2 | Untold Tales Of Spider-Man: The Complete Collection Vol. 2 | Untold Tales of Spider-Man #15-25, -1; Annual '96, Annual '97; Untold Tales of Spider-Man: Strange Encounter; material from Amazing Spider-Man Annual #37 | | TPB | | 978-1302933654 |
| | Untold Tales Of Spider-Man Omnibus | Amazing Fantasy (vol. 2) #16-18, Untold Tales of Spider-Man #1-25, -1, Annual '96, Annual '97, Untold Tales of Spider-Man: Strange Encounter, material from Amazing Spider-Man Annual #37 | 25 Aug 2012 | Omnibus | 808 | 978-0785162476 |
| | Untold Tales Of Spider-Man Omnibus | Amazing Fantasy (vol. 2) #16-18, Untold Tales of Spider-Man #1-25, -1, Annual '96, Annual '97, Untold Tales of Spider-Man: Strange Encounter, material from Amazing Spider-Man Annual #37 | 11 May 2021 | Omnibus | 808 | 978-1302928612 |
