= Tom Brevoort =

American comic book editor

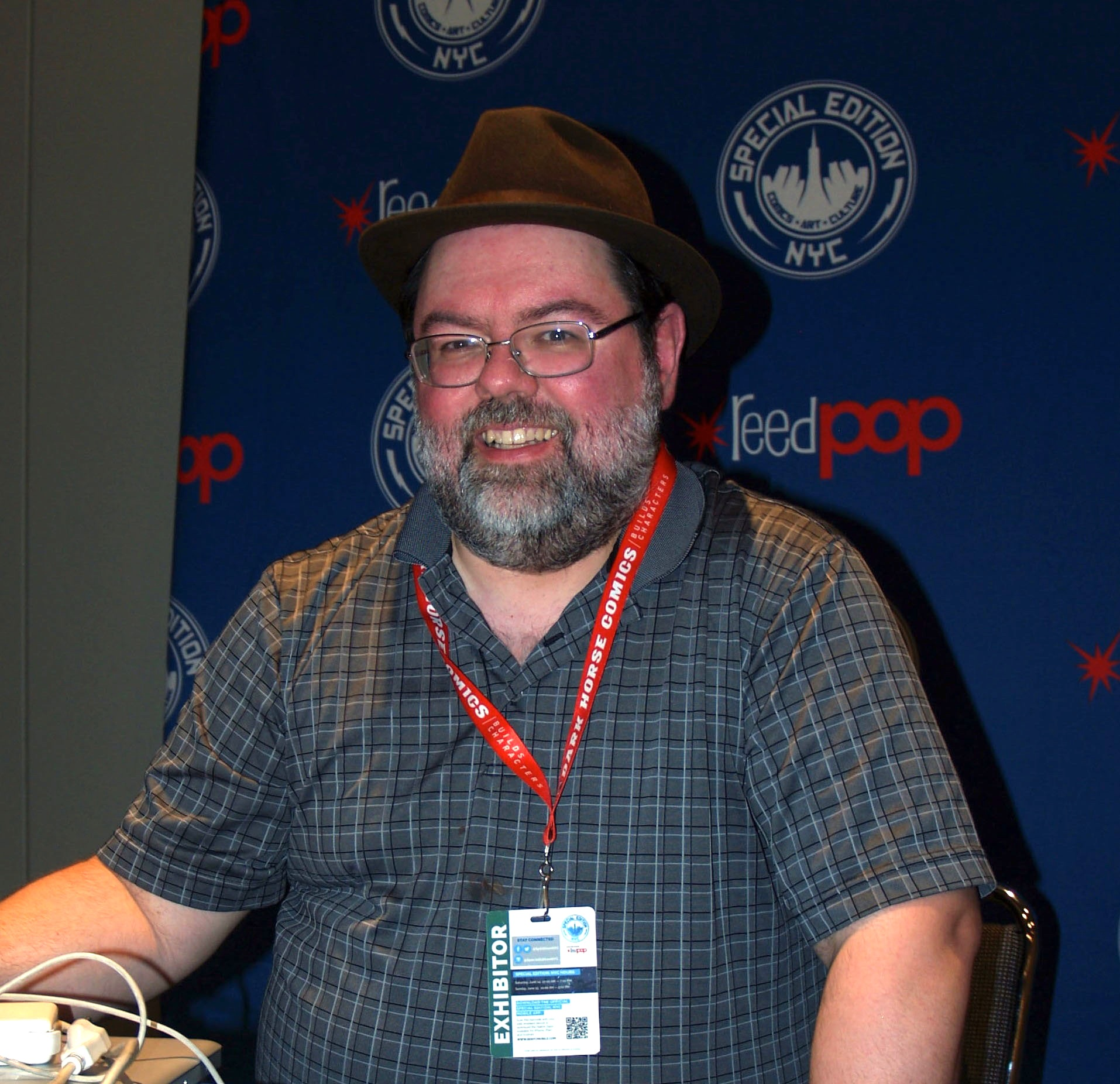
- Brevoort at the 2014 Special Edition NYC
- Area: Editor

Tom Brevoort (/ˈbriːvɔːrt/) is an American comic book editor, known for his work for Marvel Comics, where he has overseen titles such as New Avengers, Civil War, and Fantastic Four. He became Executive Editor in 2007, and in January 2011, was promoted to additionally serve as Senior Vice President of Publishing. As of 2024, he is also the Group Editor of the X-Men.

== Career ==
Tom Brevoort began working for Marvel Comics as a college intern in 1989. Commenting on his rationale for taking a non-paying entry-level job, Brevoort recalls, "Well, obviously, to get a leg up on getting into the business." He went on to say, "In the illustration program I attended at the University of Delaware, senior students were required to get and serve an internship at some company or institution related to the field of illustration. In our initial freshman orientation, the head of the department mentioned that they had previously placed one student at Marvel Comics, so I figured that was where I would set my sights."

Brevoort worked his way up to an assistant editor and later an editor in his own right. From 2007, he held the title of Executive Editor with Marvel and was responsible for multiple series including New Avengers, Civil War, and Fantastic Four.

In July 2010, Brevoort and fellow Marvel editor Axel Alonso began a weekly column on Comic Book Resources called "Marvel T&A", a new installment of which appears every Friday, along with Joe Quesada's "Cup O' Joe" column.

On January 4, 2011, Brevoort was promoted to Senior Vice President of Publishing of Marvel Comics.

As of 2020, Brevoort was Marvel's longest-serving editor.

In 2024, he became the Group Editor of the X-Men for the X-Men: From the Ashes publishing relaunch while "keeping his VP and Executive Editor titles". Brevoort, in his newsletter, commented that the shift was "because the characters were going to be of greater importance to Studios in the years to come, it made sense to have a more senior editorial presence overseeing the book". IGN stated that Brevoort replaced X-Men Group Editor Jordan D. White in what "is easily the biggest internal shake-up at Marvel since C.B. Cebulski was promoted to Editor-in-Chief in 2017". IGN highlighted that he "has spent the past 25 years overseeing Marvel's Avengers line" and helmed "numerous major crossovers like 2006's Civil War, 2012's Avengers vs. X-Men and 2015's Secret Wars" which may indicate "that Marvel is looking for Brevoort to parlay his experience in overseeing large-scale superhero stories that impact the fabric of the Marvel Universe". Popverse commented that it is "hard to underestimate the influence Tom Brevoort has had on the modern era of Marvel, be it Marvel Comics, Marvel Studios, or Marvel bedsheets even". Popverse speculated that "given Kevin Feige's start at Marvel in helping shepherd 20th Century Fox's X-Men movies back in the late '90s and early '00s, and his well-known history as a comics fan turned movie studios exec, there is something bigger going on. Think about it this way: Marvel just moved their highest-qualified editor and shepherd of comics, characters, creators and fellow editorial/design/publishing talent to re-focus his energies centrally on the X-Men".

== Awards ==
- 1997 Nominated for the Best Editor Eisner Award (for Untold Tales of Spider-Man and Daily Bugle)
