= Tom DeFalco =

American comic book writer (born 1950)

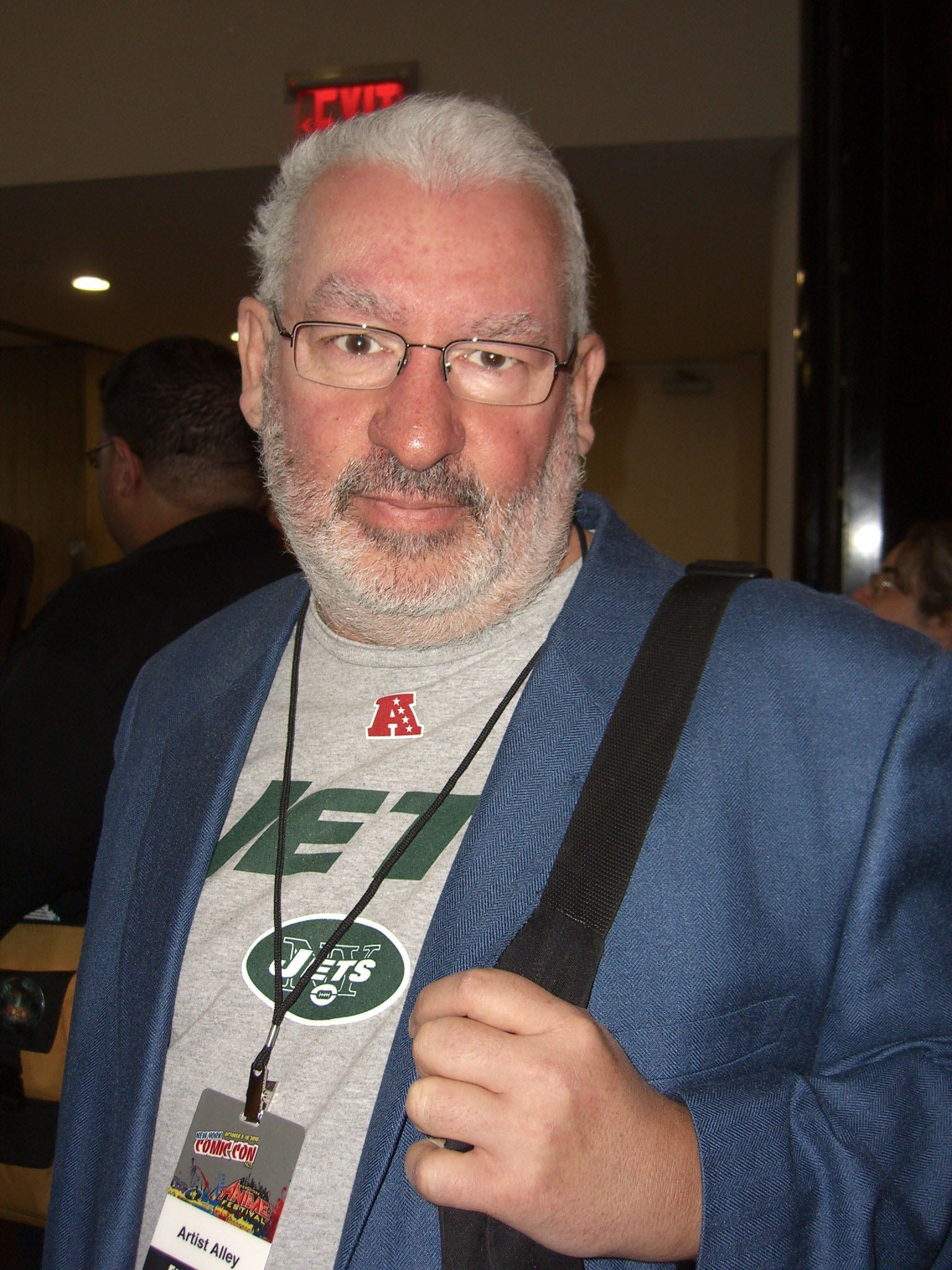
- DeFalco at the 2010 New York Comic Con
- Born: June 26, 1950 (age 76) Queens, New York City, U.S.
- Areas: Writer, Editor
- Notable works: The Amazing Spider-Man; Fantastic Four; Machine Man; Spider-Girl; Thor; Thunderstrike; New Warriors
- Awards: Inkpot Award (1990)

Tom DeFalco (born June 26, 1950) is an American comic book writer and editor well known for his association with Marvel Comics, with long runs on Amazing Spider-Man, Thor, Fantastic Four, and Spider-Girl, for which he created Mayday Parker/Spider-Girl.

== Career ==
While in college, DeFalco "wrote for a few local newspapers, a weekly comic strip and did a few short stories", and after graduation "got in touch with the various comic book companies", which led to him beginning his comics career as an editorial assistant with Archie Comics in mid-1972. During his tenure with Archie Comics, he "initiated and developed the Archie Comics Digest Series, which is still being produced today and remains the company's most profitable publishing series". Learning fast, DeFalco was soon writing for the flagship title Archie as well as for other titles including Scooby-Doo and Josie and the Pussycats.

DeFalco briefly wrote for DC Comics in the late 1970s. He scripted several Jimmy Olsen and Lois Lane stories for the Superman Family title; the final issue of Starfire (Oct.–Nov. 1977); and a Cain story in House of Mystery #258 (May–June 1978). DeFalco then moved to Marvel, where he spent the next twenty years of his career. There he wrote two issues of The Avengers and the final five issues of Machine Man plus a Machine Man issue of Marvel Team-Up, before launching Dazzler in March 1981. DeFalco wrote Marvel Two-In-One stories featuring team ups with the Thing from 1981-1982. DeFalco later wrote a Machine Man limited series in 1984, with art by Herb Trimpe and Barry Windsor-Smith.

DeFalco was the chief designer and author for Dazzler, and later became one of the writers for the Spider-Man comic book series while at the same time rising through the editorial ranks. While writing Dazzler, he wrote a couple of issues of Marvel Team-Up, before taking over from Dennis O'Neil as editor of that title, as well as assuming editorial duties on Ghost Rider, What If...? and the Spider-Man titles, which he edited throughout the early 1980s.

=== G.I. Joe and Hasbro ===
DeFalco worked closely with toy manufacturer Hasbro in the early 1980s, heading the creative team that "produced the backstory and dossiers that served as the basis for the relaunch of the phenomenally successful G.I. Joe toy line and animated television show", in 1985. As part of this relaunch, Marvel produced a comic titled G.I. Joe: A Real American Hero in June 1982. DeFalco personally edited the first six issues (handing over to Denny O'Neil in January 1983), as well as assorted issues of the G.I. Joe series' throughout the 1980s. The core G.I. Joe: A Real American Hero series ran for 155 issues over the next 12 years.

DeFalco was "part of the creative team that introduced the Transformers to the American public" in 1984.

=== Spider-Man ===
In August 1983, DeFalco wrote the first four issues of the third series of Red Sonja and after shedding his Spider-Man editorial duties to Danny Fingeroth, he took over from Roger Stern as writer of The Amazing Spider-Man. The two collaborated on April–May's #251–252 (the Secret Wars crossover issues), before DeFalco took over fully with #253, for a two-year run, chiefly in collaboration with artist Ron Frenz. Concurrent with editing Jim Shooter's Secret Wars, DeFalco introduced Spider-Man's "black costume" in the pages of Amazing. DeFalco co-created the Rose, Black Fox, and Silver Sable during his tenure on the series.

DeFalco and Frenz were both removed from The Amazing Spider-Man by then Spider-editor Jim Owsley, who stated that they had chronically failed to meet deadlines. DeFalco and Frenz both state they met their deadlines more diligently than any other Marvel creative team at the time, and that Owsley caused them to miss deadlines by repeatedly changing his production schedules. Issue #285 (Feb 1987) was their final issue, after which Owsley assumed writing duties. While writing Amazing, DeFalco continued editing various comics.

=== Editor-in-chief ===
After co-writing two issues of Fantastic Four (#301–302; April–May 1987), DeFalco took over writing duties on Thor with #383 in September. DeFalco became Marvel's tenth editor-in-chief on April 15, 1987. This change was effective in comics cover-dated November 1987. He served from 1987 to 1994, making him one of the longest serving individuals to hold that post. The only Editors-in-Chief with longer service than him were Stan Lee (1941–1942, 1944–1972), Shooter (1978–1987), and Joe Quesada (2000–2011).

Early in DeFalco's run as editor-in-chief, executive editor Mark Gruenwald remarked, "Tom does not seem to have as strong a personal vision for Marvel [as Shooter], and as a result he's more open to other people's visions. It remains to be seen if that's good or bad." In an interview with The Comic Book Gazette, DeFalco described his experiences as editor-in-chief as being "A lot like those old Bullpen Bulletins comic strips, but with significantly more yelling!"

He was a key member of the management team that took Marvel public, and under his leadership, Marvel's net profits from publishing rose by over 500%. Under DeFalco's guidance, Marvel entered a phase of expansion that provided an opportunity for "new talent" to enter the comic book industry, and released a number of new titles with original characters. After clashing with the company's upper management, DeFalco resigned in 1994.

During his tenure as editor-in-chief, DeFalco had continued to write as well, with noted runs on Thor where he created the New Warriors with artist Ron Frenz and the spin-off Thunderstrike, as well as Fantastic Four with artist Paul Ryan, and comics for Marvel children's imprint Star Comics.

=== Return to Spider-Man and creation of Spider-Girl ===
Defalco was one of the writers on the "Maximum Carnage" storyline in 1993. His resignation as editor-in-chief coincided with a run on The Spectacular Spider-Man (#215–229 Aug. 1994 – Oct. 1995), after which he returned to The Amazing Spider-Man in January 1996 for issues #407–439. During this time he helped co-write the "Clone Saga" which revealed (temporarily, at least) that Peter Parker was a clone of the original that had been active since 1975. Peter was replaced by the original Spider-Man under the alias "Ben Reilly". Following several changes of creators and fan reaction, this was soon reversed.

DeFalco created Spider-Girl, who first appeared in an issue of What If? which led to him writing the MC2 line launched in 1998 including the Spider-Girl ongoing series which ran for 100 issues. Spider-Girl went on to star in Amazing Spider-Girl (30 issues) and the most recent volume, The Spectacular Spider-Girl, making her Marvel's longest-running female star of a solo series. The character also made appearances in Amazing Spider-Man Family #5–8 and Web of Spider-Man vol. 2 #1–7.

In early 2009, as the Spider-Girl series was drawing to a close, DeFalco said it might be some of his last work for Marvel as he was in danger of being typecast because of his long run with the characters.

The bad news about working on the same thing for that many years is that editors start to believe that it is the only thing you can do. So the only way I can get non-Spider-related work is to work for other companies.

The Spider-Girl series was cancelled in 2010.

In 2009, DeFalco revisited the "Clone Saga" with the six-part mini series Spider-Man: The Clone Saga, based on the original outline of this controversial storyline. As guest writer he contributed two issues to Sensational Spider-Man vol. 2 in 2012, as well as stories for Spider-Ham 25th Anniversary Special #1 (2010), Spider-Verse Team-Up #3 (2015) and the one-shot Sensational Spider-Man: Self-Improvement in 2019.

=== Other work ===
DeFalco is the author of over a dozen graphic novels, several hundred comic book stories, several dozen cyber-comics, three novels and six children's books, including the best-selling Dorling Kindersley guides to Marvel comics characters. These include: Spider-Man: The Ultimate Guide, Avengers: The Ultimate Guide, Fantastic Four: The Ultimate Guide and Hulk: The Incredible Guide. For Titan Books he has compiled three volumes in their "Comic Creators On..." series of essays and thoughts on Marvel characters (Spider-Man, the Fantastic Four and the X-Men, between 2004 and 2006).

DeFalco has personally created and developed over three dozen characters that have all been licensed for television, toys, T-shirts, posters, trading cards and other merchandise, and has written Khan and The Phantom for Moonstone Books.

In April 2010, Archie Comics announced DeFalco would be returning to his roots to write a four-part storyline, "The Man from R.I.V.E.R.D.A.L.E.", beginning with Archie Comics issue #610.

DeFalco returned to DC Comics in August 2011 with the plot for a Superman one-shot, Superman Beyond, and in 2012 as guest writer on Nightwing and helping on the Ravagers for DC's The New 52 line. DeFalco began scripting the Superboy series over Scott Lobdell's plots with issue #6 (April 2012) and became the full writer with issue #12 (October 2012). His Superboy run ended with #18, which was co-scripted by Tony Lee. He also wrote Legion Lost #0 and 6–18 and the final four issues (#17–20) of Savage Hawkman.

In December 2016, Archie Comics launched a new ongoing Reggie & Me series by DeFalco and artist Sandy Jarrell. In 2021, Apex Comics Group launched a successful crowdfunding campaign for The R.I.G.H.T. Project, a new comic book written by DeFalco with pencils by Ron Frenz and inks by Sal Buscema. For Marvel Comics, DeFalco wrote the limited series Marvel Super Heroes Secret Wars: Battle World in 2023, drawn by Pat Oliffe, a sequel to Marvel's Secret Wars from the 1980s. In 2026, he wrote the oneshot G.I. Joe: Sssilent Missions: Zartan with art by Pat Oliffe for Image Comics.

== Bibliography ==
=== Ape Entertainment ===
- Richie Rich: Rich Rescue #2 (2011)

=== Apex Comics Group ===
- The R.I.G.H.T. Project #1 (2022)

=== Archie Comics ===
- Archie #254–256, 258–262, 610–613, 621–622, 645, 648–649, 655, 657–658, 666 (1976–1977, 2010–2015)
- Archie & Friends #153 (2011)
- Archie Christmas Spectacular #1 (2022 oneshot)
- Archie Christmas Spectacular #1 (2023 oneshot)
- Archie Double Digest #220, 221, 262, 266, 270, 273, 338, 341 (2011–2016, 2023)
- Archie Halloween Spectacular oneshot (2023)
- Archie's Funhouse Double Digest #15 (2015)
- Archie's Girls Betty and Veronica #254 (1977)
- Archie's Super Hero Comics Digest Magazine #2 (1979)
- The Archies Anniversary Spectacular #1 (2022)
- Betty #193 (2011)
- Betty and Me #105 (1979)
- Betty and Veronica vol. 2 #256, 271 (2011–2014)
- Betty and Veronica Double Digest #234, 319, 322 (2015, 2023–2024)
- Betty and Veronica: Summer Spectacular #1 (2024)
- Jughead and Archie Double Digest #15 (2015)
- Jughead's Double Digest #175–177 (2012)
- Laugh Comics #281, 311 (1974–1977)
- Life with Archie #182, 205 (1977–1979)
- Mighty Crusaders #9 (1984)
- Reggie and Me #1–5 (2017)
- Sam Hill: In the Crosshairs OGN (2015)
- World of Archie Double Digest #64, 129, 132, 133, 137 (2017, 2023–2024)

=== Charlton Comics ===
- Scoobie Doo, Where Are You #3, 7–8 (1975–1976)
- Wheelie and the Chopper Bunch #4–5 (1976)
- Yogi Bear #25, 31 (1975–1976)

=== Dark Horse Comics ===
- 9-11: Artists Respond #1 (among others) (2002)

=== DC Comics ===
- Adventures of Superman vol. 3 #4 (2013)
- The Best of DC #58 (Super Jrs. Holiday Special) (1985; originally planned for All-New Collectors' Edition in 1977)
- Cancelled Comic Calvacade #1 (Claw the Unconquered) (1978)
- House of Mystery #258 (1978)
- Justice League of America vol. 3 #7.3 (2013)
- Justice League of America vol. 4 #23 (2017)
- Legion Lost vol. 2 #0, 6–16 (2012–2013)
- Nightwing #13–14 (2013)
- Ravagers #2 (2012)
- Savage Hawkman #17–20 (2013)
- Secrets of Haunted House #16 (1979)
- Starfire #8 (1977)
- Superboy vol. 5 #0, 6–18, Annual #1 (2012–2013)
- Superman Beyond #0 (2011)
- Superman Family #185–194 (Jimmy Olsen/Lois Lane) (1977–1979)
- Teen Titans vol. 4 #9, Annual #1 (2012)
- Young Love #126 (1977)

=== Dynamite Entertainment ===
- Red Sonja Halloween Special One-Shot (2018)

=== Image Comics ===
- Randy O'Donnell is the M@n #1–3 (2001)
- G.I. Joe: A Real American Hero Sssilent Missions: Zartan #1 (2026)

=== Marvel Comics ===
- Amazing Scarlet Spider #2 (1995)
- Amazing Spider-Girl #0–30 (2006–2009)
- Amazing Spider-Man #251–261, 263, 265, 268–285, 365, 375, 407–439, -1, Annual #18, 22, 24, '96, '98 (1984–1998)
- Amazing Spider-Man Family #1–8 (Spider Girl feature in #5–8) (2008–2009)
- American Dream #1–5 (2008)
- A-Next #1–12 (1998–1999)
- Avengers #179–180, Annual #16 (1979, 1987)
- Avengers Next #1–5 (2007)
- Avengers Unlimited Infinity Comic #37-38 (2023)
- Battlestar Galactica #10 (1979)
- Bizarre Adventures #31–32 (1982)
- Black Knight oneshot (2009)
- Buzz #1–3 (2000)
- Captain America #383 (1991)
- Captain America vol. 3 #24 (1999)
- Conan Saga #14 (1988)
- Crazy Magazine #22–26, 29, 36, 42, 64 (1977–1980)
- Darkdevil #1–3 (2000–2001)
- Dazzler #1–7 (1981)
- Doom 2099 #42 (1996)
- Fantastic Five #1–5 (1999–2000)
- Fantastic Five vol. 2 #1–5 (2007)
- Fantastic Four #301–302, 356–416, 645, Annual #25 (1987, 1991–1996, 2015)
- Fantastic Four: Atlantis Rising #1–2 (1995)
- Fantastic Four Fanfare #3 (2025)
- Fear Itself: The Worthy oneshot (2011)
- Firestar #1–4 (1986)
- Generation X #32 (1997)
- Green Goblin #1–13 (1995–1996)
- Hawkeye: Earth's Mightiest Marksman oneshot (1998)
- Hercules: Heart of Chaos #1–3 (1997)
- Hulk Smash Avengers #1 (2012)
- Iron Age 2020 #1 (2020)
- J2 #1–12 (1998–1999)
- Journey into Mystery #503–513, -1 (Lost Gods) (1996–1997)
- Kickers Inc. #1–5 (1986–1987)
- Kid Colt oneshot (2009)
- Last Hero Standing #1–5 (with Pat Oliffe) (2005)
- Last Planet Standing #1–5 (with Pat Oliffe) (2005)(2006)
- Machine Man #15–19 (1980–1981)
- Machine Man vol. 2 #1–4 (1984)
- Machine Man 2020 #1–2 (2020)
- Marvel 75th Anniversary Celebration (among others) #1 (2014)
- Marvel Comics #1000 (among others) (2020)
- Marvel Holiday Special #1 (Thor) (1991)
- Marvel Holiday Special 1996 (X-Men) (1996)
- Marvel Holiday Special 2004 (Spider-Man) (2004)
- Marvel Mystery Comics 70th Anniversary Special #1 (Sub-Mariner/Human Torch) (2009)
- Marvel Super Heroes Secret Wars: Battle World #1–4 (2023–2024)
- Marvel Super Special #23 (Annie adaptation) (1982)
- Marvel Valentine Special #1 (1997)
- Marvel Tails Starring Peter Porker the Spectacular Spider-Ham #1 (1983)
- Marvel Team-Up #99, 106–107, 109, 138, 140–41 (1980–1984)
- Marvel Team-Up vol. 2 #6 (1998)
- Marvel Two-in-One #40, 75–87, 91–93, 96, Annual #7 (1978, 1981–1983)
- Red Sonja vol. 3 #1–4 (1983–1984)
- Sensational Spider-Man vol. 2 #33.1–33.2 (2012)
- Sensational Spider-Man: Self-Improvement #1 (backup story) (2019)
- Silver Surfer #132–133, 136 (with J.M. DeMatteis), #146 (with Glenn Greenberg), #1/2 (1997–1998)
- Silver Surfer/Thor '98 (1998)
- Solo Avengers #1–17 (Hawkeye) (1987–1989)
- Spectacular Spider-Girl #1–4 (2010)
- Spectacular Spider-Man #41, 215–229, 254–255 (1980, 1994–1998)
- Speedball #1 (with Steve Ditko and Roger Stern) (1988)
- Spider-Girl #1–100, 1/2, Annual '99 (1998–2006)
- Spider-Girl: The End #1 (2010)
- Spider-Ham 25th Anniversary Special #1 (2010)
- Spider-Man #1/2 (1998)
- Spider-Man and His Amazing Friends #1 (1981)
- Spider-Man Family oneshot (Spider-Girl) (2005)
- Spider-Man/Kingpin oneshot (with Stan Lee) (1997)
- Spider-Man: Maximum Clonage Alpha #1 (1995)
- Spider-Man: The Clone Journal #1 (1995)
- Spider-Man: The Clone Saga #1–6 (2009–2010)
- Spider-Man: The Mysterio Manifesto #1–3 (2001)
- Spider-Man Unlimited #1–6, 15, 18 (1993–1997)
- Spider-Verse Team-Up #3 (2015)
- Star Trek #7 (1980)
- Star Trek: Mirror Mirror #1 (1997)
- Tales of the Marvel Universe #1 (Fantastic Four) (1997)
- Tales to Astonish vol. 2 #12 (1979)
- Team America #11 (1983)
- Thor vol. 1 #383–384, 386–400, 402–459, 490, Annual #16 (1987–1993, 1995)
- Thor: The Legend #1 (1996)
- Thor vol. 6 #25 (2022)
- Thor Corps #1–4 (1993)
- Thor: The Worthy #1 (Thunderstrike) (2020)
- Thundercats #13, 15, 23 (1987–1988)
- Thunderstrike #1–24 (1993–1995)
- Thunderstrike vol. 2 #1–5 (2011)
- Uncanny X-Men #228 (with Chris Claremont) (1988)
- Untold Tales of Spider-Man #23 (with Kurt Busiek) (1997)
- Venom #252 (plot) (2025)
- Web of Scarlet Spider #1–2 (1995)
- Web of Spider-Man vol. 2 #1–7 (Spider-Girl) (2009–2010)
- Webspinners: Tales of Spider-Man #17–18 (2000)
- West Coast Avengers #41 (1989)
- What If #20, 37 (1980–1983)
- What If vol. 2 #105–108, 111 (1998)
- Wild Thing #0–5 (1999–2000)
- Wolverine #123–124 (1998)
- Wolverine: Bloody Choices OGN (1991)
- X-Factor #32 (1988)
- X-Men Unlimited #18 (1998)
- X-Men vs. The Avengers #4 (1987)

=== Moonstone Books ===
- Airfighters #1–2 (2010)
- Khan #1 (2005)
- Kolchak Tales: Ghost Stories #1 (2006)
- Moonstone Monsters: Vampire Vixens oneshot (2002)
- The Phantom: Generations #2 (2009)
- The Phantom: Valley of the Golden Men oneshot (2004)

Preceded by Jim Shooter	Marvel Comics Editor-in-Chief; 1987–1994	Succeeded by Group Editors-in-Chief: Bob Budiansky, Spider-Man titles; Bobbie Chase, Marvel Edge titles; Mark Gruenwald, Heroes & Cosmic titles; Bob Harras, X-Men titles; Carl Potts, licensed-property titles
Preceded by Jim Shooter	The Avengers writer 1979	Succeeded by David Michelinie
Preceded by n/a	Dazzler writer 1981	Succeeded by Danny Fingeroth
Preceded by Roger Stern	The Amazing Spider-Man writer 1984–1987	Succeeded by Jim Owsley
Preceded by Walt Simonson	Thor writer 1987–1993 (with Ron Frenz credited as co-writer from 1989–1993)	Succeeded by Ron Marz and Jim Starlin
Preceded by Walt Simonson	Fantastic Four writer 1991–1996	Succeeded by Brandon Choi and Jim Lee
Preceded by Ann Nocenti	The Spectacular Spider-Man writer 1994–1995	Succeeded by Todd Dezago
Preceded by J. M. DeMatteis	The Amazing Spider-Man writer 1996–1998	Succeeded by John Byrne
