= A-Next =

Group of fictional characters

- The A-Next Team

Group publication information
- Publisher: Marvel Comics' MC2
- First appearance: What If? #105
- Created by: Tom DeFalco; Ron Frenz

In-story information
- Base(s): Avengers Mansion
- Agent(s): Current roster American Dream; Bluestreak; J2; Kate Power; Sabreclaw; Thena; Thunderstrike; Warp Reserve members Argo the Almighty; Blacklight; Coal Tiger; Earth Sentry; Spider-Girl Former members Ant-Man; Captain America; Crimson Curse; Freebooter; Hawkeye; Mainframe; Scarlet Witch; Stinger; Vision

A-Next

Series publication information
- Schedule: Monthly
- Format: Limited series
- Genre: Superhero
- Publication date: (A-Next); Oct. 1998 – Sept. 1999 (Avengers Next); Jan. – March 2007

Creative team
- Writer(s): Tom DeFalco; Ron Frenz (A-Next); Ron Lim (Avengers Next)
- Penciller(s): Ron Frenz (A-Next); Ron Lim (Avengers Next)
- Inker(s): Brett Breeding, Al Milgrom (A-Next); Scott Koblish (Avengers Next)
- Letterer(s): Jim Novak (A-Next); Dave Sharpe (Avengers Next)
- Colourist(s): Bob Sharen (A-Next); Rob Ro, Avalon Studio (Avengers Next)
- Creator(s): Tom DeFalco; Ron Frenz
- Editor(s): Bob Harras (A-Next); Molly Lazar (Avengers Next)

A-Next is a team of superheroes appearing in American comic books published by Marvel Comics. It is the Marvel Comics 2 universe version of the Avengers. The team made its first appearance in What If? #105, the first comic featuring Spider-Girl, and the team's origin story was told in A-Next #1 (Oct. 1998).

== Publication history ==
The first issue of A-Next paid homage to The Avengers #1, with an Asgardian menace prompting new superheroes to band together, all of them analogues to the original team. Future stories introduced new heroes and villains, most of them based on pre-existing Marvel characters. Characters and story elements created by DeFalco in the comic were used in other comics in the MC2 Universe.

A five issue miniseries entitled Avengers Next ran from November 2006 to January 2007, written by Tom DeFalco and with artwork by Ron Lim, that followed on from the events of Last Hero Standing and Last Planet Standing. It reunited the remaining members of A-Next and added new members to the team, namely Sabreclaw, Kate Power (of Power Pack), Thena, the daughter of Thor, and a former criminal teleporter called Warp.

== Fictional team biography ==
Art from A-Next comic series.

The new team comes together when Avengers Museum (formerly Avengers Mansion) is attacked by Asgardian trolls commanded by Loki, prompting the museum's caretaker and former butler Edwin Jarvis to send out a distress signal.

The summons is responded to by several heroes including Thunderstrike (Kevin Masterson, son of the original Thunderstrike, who was visiting the mansion at the time of the attack); Stinger (Scott Lang's daughter Cassie Lang, now an entomologist, who was testing Ant-Man's old uniform); Mainframe (a mysterious armored individual); J2 (Zane Yama, high school student and teenage son of the Juggernaut) and the adult Speedball, Jubilee and Jolt.

The heroes are transported to Asgard by Loki, who wants to retrieve the Thunderstrike mace's powers for himself, but Kevin disrupts the spell, absorbing the mace into himself and transforming into a new Thunderstrike in the process. Loki and the trolls are then defeated by the heroes, with assistance from Thor, now the King of Asgard. Thunderstrike, Stinger, J2, and Mainframe decide to stay together as the new Avengers. The adult heroes decline to stay with the reformed team.

A downed Kree spaceship leads to the transformation of Bill Foster's son John into Earth Sentry, an analog of Captain Marvel. Doc Magus, the new Sorcerer Supreme, then recruits the Avengers into fighting the reformed Defenders.

Four new members are then inducted into the Avengers by Mainframe and Jarvis. The new members: American Dream, (a female analogue of Captain America); Freebooter (who modeled himself on Hawkeye and the Swordsman); Crimson Curse (an analogue to the Scarlet Witch) and Bluestreak (an analogue to Quicksilver); known collectively as the Dream Team, save N'kano, the Wakandan ambassador, from the racist Soldiers of the Serpent (an amalgam of the Sons of the Serpent and elements from the Egyptian god Set), with the assistance of the Coal Tiger, the son of the Black Panther.

Afterwards, the team investigates the apparent return of Doctor Doom, who is revealed to be Kristoff Vernard in disguise. The team is then attacked by Argo, who claims to be Hercules' son, followed by an encounter with the villainous Ion Man, prompting Mainframe to reveal he is a sentient computer program based on Tony Stark's personality.

The new Avengers discover the Scarlet Witch in suspended animation in the mansion's subterranean levels, powering a gate to an alternate Earth. After defeating the Soldiers of the Serpent again, with the help of Blacklight (the daughter of Monica Rambeau), the Avengers travel to the alternate dimension, which had been conquered by Red Skull after World War II, and was now ruled by the Skull's adopted son, Dr. Doom, who had murdered the Skull. During the battle, they discover Captain America is alive and leading the resistance, and the Avengers help them defeat the Nazi forces, including the Thunder Guard, an alternate version of the Avengers.

Thunderstrike elects to stay on the alternate Earth, and the remaining Avengers return to Earth, receiving a reprimand from Tony Stark and Clint Barton. Immediately afterwards, they're attacked by a team of villains known as the Revengers, led by Red Queen and Big Man, the children of Hank and Janet Pym, out for revenge. The Avengers, alongside their reserve members Earth Sentry, Coal Tiger, Argo and Blacklight, defeat the Revengers.

The team was occasionally seen aiding Spider-Girl, and also appeared during Last Hero Standing and Last Planet Standing. The team also made a cameo within Fantastic Five vol. 2 #4, in which they were fighting one of the cosmic-powered Doombots.

== Team members ==
=== Founding members ===
==== J2 ====
The only minor in the team, J2 is Zane Yama, a 15-year-old high school student and the son of the original Juggernaut (Cain Marko) and district attorney Sachi Yama. Picked on by bullies at school, he manifested the ability to grow to a huge size, in which he gains super strength and invulnerability. His uniform, which includes his father's favorite flannel shirt tied around his waist over his armor, manifests itself automatically upon metamorphosis. He can only stay this way for about an hour.

==== Mainframe ====
Mainframe is a self-aware computer program, created by Tony Stark, which inhabits a series of identical armors. When an armor is damaged or destroyed, he simply transfers his consciousness to another body. His robot body utilizes Stark technology similar to the one found in the Iron Man armor. His personality is based on his creator's, possibly created by the same process as the Vision's.

==== Stinger ====
Dr. Cassandra Lang is the daughter of the second Ant-Man, Scott Lang. Although she is the oldest member, in her mid-20s, and the only one on the team with a professional life and a scientific background, she is still doted on by her father, who constantly worries about her new-found superhero life. She possesses many abilities originally engineered by Henry Pym, including resizing, flying, communication with insects and artificial "stingers", all based on her costume and helmet.

==== Thunderstrike ====
18-year-old Kevin Masterson is the son of the original Thunderstrike. He absorbed his father's mace into his body, and has gained the ability to produce "thunderclaps"; bursts of concussive force from his hands. He can use them to simulate super strength or to propel him in huge Hulk-like leaps. Although he doesn't possess real super strength, he has limited invulnerability. In his civilian identity, he is a college student.

=== Dream Team ===
The Dream Team is a fictional group of heroes in the Marvel Comics MC2 universe. They first appeared in A-Next #4, and are based upon the "kooky quartet" of replacement Avengers introduced in Avengers #16. In their first appearance, Mainframe accepts them as members of the Avengers without consulting the existing members, which initially creates conflict between the original A-Next team and the Dream Team.

The team roster comprises:

==== American Dream ====
Shannon Carter is the niece of Sharon Carter. Her uniform design is based on Captain America's and includes a set of stun discs (similar to Nomad's) that can be thrown at opponents. She does not possess any powers, but is an Olympic-level athlete, a skilled fighter and a strategist. American Dream was later rewarded the shield of an alternate-reality Captain America after saving that world from destruction.

==== Bluestreak ====
Blue Kelso is impatient and straightforward. Her main power is superspeed. She was once affiliated with the X-People (successors to the X-Men), until she joined the Avengers, thinking the move would net her more publicity.

==== Crimson Curse ====
Aerika Harkness is related to the witch Agatha Harkness, former teacher to the Scarlet Witch. She possesses control over magical energies, although the exact nature of those energies is not known. They appear similar to the way the Scarlet Witch's powers were originally portrayed, and she can control it with relative ease. She died stopping an alternate Doctor Doom from attempting to use the Cosmic Cube to invade the Avengers' Earth.

==== Freebooter ====
Brandon Cross was trained by Hawkeye and Swordsman and has shown proficiency with a variety of weapons as well as athletic skills. His costume design draws from both Hawkeye and the Swordsman. Freebooter was romantically linked to Crimson Curse.

=== Other recruits ===
==== Kate Power ====
Kate Power, originally known as Energizer, is the youngest member of Power Pack, a team of pre-teen superheroes formed by her and her three siblings after gaining their powers from a Kymellian named Aelfyre Whitemane. Her abilities involve disintegrating matter, absorbing its energy and unleashing it as powerballs. Kate joined the Avengers after Franklin Richards recommended Kate to them in their search for Thunderstrike.

==== Sabreclaw ====
Hudson Logan is the son of Wolverine and half-brother to Wild Thing. He possesses claws and a healing factor similar to Wolverine's. He was once a member of the Revengers, but joined the Avengers when he claimed to have reformed.

==== Thena ====
Thena is the daughter of Thor. She was sent to Earth by Thor to search for Kevin Masterson and restore his powers. Initially, she showed great dislike for J2, especially after she realized her abilities had no effect on him, and broke her hammer on his helmet. After J2 saved her from Sylene's cauldron, she was more amicable with him, even giving him a kiss.

==== Warp ====
Warp is a thief with the power to teleport. He originally worked for Sylene (the daughter of Loki) and Ulik. When he learned that they planned to turn Earth into a new version of Asgard, he defected to the Avengers.

=== Reserve members ===
==== Argo the Almighty ====
Argo is the son of former Avenger Hercules. Argo is trying to find his missing father and, needing help, turns to A-Next. Using their S.H.I.E.L.D. contacts, the team is able to locate Hercules, who is suffering from mental trauma from witnessing an event which nearly destroyed the Avengers. Argo attacks his father, enraged that his father "abandoned" his mother and his son, but Thunderstrike intervenes. When Argo sees the emotional state his father is in, the two reconcile. Argo states that he was going to help his father recover, and try to bring his family back together. Later, when A-Next is attacked by the Revengers, Argo fights for his friends (along with other allies of A-Next) and when they won the battle, Argo accepts membership in A-Next.

==== Blacklight ====
Kendra Freeman is the daughter of Photon and Derek Freeman. Blacklight has the ability to manipulate solid light constructs, and use it to fire blasts of destructive energy. She can also focus her energies into solid form and create energy-constructs out of dark force in virtually any form she can envision (ramps, stop signs, giant shovels, etc.). She can also use her energy powers to fly at high speed.

==== Coal Tiger ====
Coal Tiger is the son of Black Panther - named after his grandfather - and the prince of Wakanda. He is able to transform into a humanoid cat-like being. In this feline form, he has superhuman strength and agility, enhanced senses and retractable razor-sharp claws on his fingers and toes.

The character has received accolades from critics.

- In 2020, CBR.com ranked Coal Tiger 2nd in their "10 Most Powerful Alternate Versions Of Black Panther" list.
- In 2022, Screen Rant included Coal Tiger in their "15 Most Powerful Variants Of Black Panther In Marvel Comics" list.

==== Earth Sentry ====
John Foster is the son of Bill Foster. When John and his father Bill were investigating a UFO crash site, they discovered a Kree space probe. When they neared the ship, the automated defenses activated, and a robotic sentry was released. Bill activated a distress signal which was picked up by Mainframe and the rest of A-Next.

==== Spider-Girl ====
Spider-Girl is May "Mayday" Parker, the daughter of Spider-Man and Mary Jane Watson. She possesses the same spider-powers as her father and wears a costume similar to that of her father's clone, the Scarlet Spider, when he briefly wore the mantle of Spider-Man.

== In other media ==
Mainframe appears in Hulk and the Agents of S.M.A.S.H., voiced by Jeffrey Combs. This version is a gaming A.I. created by Iron Man that gained sentience. In the episode "Wheels of Fury", he threatened to destroy a city if Iron Man lost his real-life game, which Mainframe merely saw as continuing Iron Man's challenge as ordered. In response, the agents of S.M.A.S.H. went up against Mainframe's robots in a roller derby. After the agents of S.M.A.S.H. and Iron Man defeat Mainframe's robots, Mainframe is persuaded not to attack the city. Desiring to learn more about the real world, Mainframe creates a new body and leaves to see the world. In the episode "Planet Monster" Pt. 2, Mainframe is among several heroes who help the agents of S.M.A.S.H. and the Avengers fight the Supreme Intelligence's forces.

== Collected editions ==
Title	Material collected	Published date	ISBN
Spider-Girl Presents Avengers Next Volume 1: Second Coming	A-Next #1-6	August 2006	978-0785121312
Avengers Next: Rebirth	Avengers Next #1-5	June 2007	978-0785125181
