= Last Planet Standing =

Marvel comic book series (2006)

- Cover of Last Planet Standing #1

Publication information
- Publisher: Marvel Comics
- Schedule: Bi-weekly
- Format: Limited series
- Genre: Superhero
- Publication date: July – September 2006
- No. of issues: 5
- Main character: Most MC2 heroes

Creative team
- Created by: Tom DeFalco; Pat Olliffe
- Written by: Tom DeFalco (plot and script); Pat Olliffe (plot)
- Penciller: Pat Olliffe
- Inker: Scott Koblish
- Letterer: Dave Sharpe
- Colorist: Rob Ro (Avalon Studios)
- Editor(s): Molly Lazer; Joe Quesada

Collected editions
- Last Planet Standing: ISBN 0-7851-1998-1

Last Planet Standing is a 5-issue comic book limited series, published by Marvel Comics in 2006. The series was written by Tom DeFalco and drawn by Pat Olliffe (who also co-plotted the series). It stars many characters from the MC2 Universe and is a sequel to the 2005 miniseries Last Hero Standing.

== Plot summary ==
Reed and Sue Richards investigate a strange phenomena in another galaxy and determine that Earth may be in danger within a week. Before Reed can send a message to warn Earth, an alien vessel piloted by Dominas causes a sun in the middle of the galaxy to overload and implode, creating a massive shockwave that destroys Reed's ship.

On Earth, the Fantastic Five receive Reed's transmission. They rush into a rescue operation while Doom stays behind to warn the President and the other heroes. Doom informs A-Next of the current situation, but they are busy dealing with the Revengers. Edwin Jarvis sends A-Next the emergency call and Stinger calls her team back, realizing that protecting Earth is more important than fighting the Revengers.

Dominas continues to wreak havoc on the Shi'ar Throneworld, and his master Galactus prepares to devour it completely. Despite the Imperial Guard's efforts, Galactus destroys the Throneworld, with empress Lilandra Neramani escaping to safety. Galactus reveals to Dominas that he no longer desires to merely sate his hunger, but to gather energy with the intention of evolving to the next level. The newly birthed Captain America star is vital to his plan. Galactus decides to absorb Asgard next.

The Fantastic Five discover that Reed and Sue survived, having been protected by Sue's force field. Once the F5 find their missing teammates, they advise the President about the situation and head back home to help deal with it. Reed has a long-standing plan to stop Galactus if it should ever become necessary.

Meanwhile, Thor leads his warriors into battle against Galactus, but is overwhelmed in battle. While Thor is taken prisoner by Galactus, the other Asgardians escape. Dominas also apprehends the Odinsword for its cosmic power, allowing him to absorb Asgard.

Back on Earth, Vision has agreed to send in a few members of A-Next to battle the Revengers, including Spider-Girl, Stinger, Mainframe, and Thunderstrike. As Thunderstrike faces Sabreclaw, he suddenly loses his powers due to the destruction of Asgard. As Thunderstrike's secret identity is revealed, Spider-Girl and the rest decide to let the Revengers escape to bring their teammate into safety.

Galactus arrives on Earth, causing tremendous planet-wide destruction and chaos. While the heroes do their best to keep everyone safe, Dominas reveals that Galactus plans to destroy and recreate the universe. The Silver Surfer learns of his former master's plans, and arrives on Earth to deal with it. He and Dominas face each other. The Surfer triumphs, absorbing Dominas's Power Cosmic and becoming even more powerful than before. The Surfer's Power Cosmic and Scarlet Witch's reality-altering power combined enable Reed's machine to destroy Galactus's barrier, and Stinger, American Dream and Spider-Girl manage to reverse the effect of Galactus' device, causing him immense pain.

As the Surfer faces the dying, energy-saturated Galactus, they merge into a new unnamed entity who declares that a new form of energy, the "Power Essential", has been born through the union. Instantly repairing the damage Galactus caused on Earth, the entity vows to be a builder of worlds and a guardian of life, bringing life to dead planets.

== Collected editions ==
The limited series has been collected in a trade paperback:

- Last Planet Standing (120 pages, October 2006, ISBN 0-7851-1998-1)

== Significance and reception ==
When this miniseries was first introduced to the fans, Marvel revealed that it would be the final adventures of the MC2 universe. Likewise, in the ongoing Spider-Girl series, a storyline took place in which she was supposed to die. When the fans "revolted" against this decision, it was quickly made clear that the final pages of the miniseries were not yet completed and that if this series was well by the public, the MC2 universe would be spared. With many unresolved plot lines, and Last Planet Standing being well-received, it was decided to let the MC2 universe continue. While the original Spider-Girl series would be cancelled by issue #100, a few months later it was relaunched as Amazing Spider-Girl #1.
