= Ron Frenz =

American comics artist

- Born: Ronald Wade Frenz; February 1, 1960 (age 66) Pittsburgh, Pennsylvania, U.S.
- Areas: Writer, Penciller
- Notable works: The Amazing Spider-Man; Spider-Girl; Superman; Thor; Thunderstrike

Ronald Wade "Ron" Frenz (born February 1, 1960) is an American comics artist known for his work for Marvel Comics. He is well known for his 1980s work on The Amazing Spider-Man, particularly introducing the hero's black costume, and later for his work on Spider-Girl and Thor, for which he respectively co-created the characters of Mayday Parker as well as Thunderstrike and the New Warriors with writer Tom DeFalco.

== Career ==
Frenz began working for Marvel Comics in the early 1980s. Frenz's early work includes such titles as Ka-Zar the Savage, Star Wars, The Further Adventures of Indiana Jones, and Marvel Saga. His first credited story for Marvel was published in Ka-Zar the Savage #16 (July 1982).

Frenz has a history of working on comic book series in which the characters were not in their original costumes/identities. Spider-Man wore his black costume, Thor took on a new secret identity and look, and Superman changed costumes and powers while Frenz was the regular artist on their titles.

Frenz became the regular artist on The Amazing Spider-Man in 1984 and the stories he pencilled included "The Kid Who Collects Spider-Man" in issue #248 (Jan. 1984) and the first appearance of Spider-Man's black costume in issue #252 (May 1984). Among the new characters introduced during his run were the Puma in issue #256 (Sept. 1984) and Silver Sable in #265 (June 1985). Frenz and Tom DeFalco revealed that the "black suit" was an alien creature in issue #258 (Nov. 1984). Frenz drew The Amazing Spider-Man Annual #18 (1984), a story written by Stan Lee, which featured the wedding of Spider-Man supporting characters J. Jonah Jameson and Marla Madison. Frenz had originally been brought onto the series as a short-term substitute for John Romita Jr., but was retained when it became apparent that he meshed well with series writer DeFalco. Frenz recounted:

Initially, I was hired to only do six issues, while Romita, Jr. went off to get X-Men up and running. And he was supposed to come back and do both X-Men and The Amazing Spider-Man. And six issues in, I found out from [editor] Danny Fingeroth that JR had come into the office and said he'd seen the stuff that Tom and I were doing, and Danny said, "Yeah, I'm really happy with what they're doing." And JR said, "You are, aren't you?" And Danny said, "Yeah, I think they're really gelling as a team." And JR said, "If you're really happy with these guys, give it to them." And the first time I met JR, I thanked him for my run on Spider-Man.

Jim Owsley, editor of the Spider-Man titles at the time, has noted that "Frenz was passionate about Spider-Man, verging on fanatical." In 1986, Frenz and DeFalco were removed from The Amazing Spider-Man by Owsley. Frenz and DeFalco became the creative team on Thor in 1987 and introduced the Eric Masterson character in Thor #391 (May 1988). Eric Masterson later became the superhero known as Thunderstrike and received his own series by DeFalco and Frenz in 1993.

In 1995, Frenz moved to DC Comics and became the artist on Superman. The following year, he was one of the many creators who contributed to the Superman: The Wedding Album one-shot wherein the title character married Lois Lane. Superman received a new costume, designed by Frenz himself, and new superpowers in Superman vol. 2 #123 (May 1997). Frenz drew part of the Superman Red/Superman Blue one-shot which launched the storyline of the same name which ran through the various Superman titles.

Frenz returned to Marvel with the Spider-Man: Hobgoblin Lives limited series, written by Roger Stern, in 1997. DeFalco and Frenz reunited and introduced Spider-Girl in What If ...? vol. 2 #105 (Feb. 1998). Spider-Girl became an ongoing series in October 1998 and ran until issue #100 (Sept. 2006). A new series, The Amazing Spider-Girl, was launched the following December, Frenz drew all 30 issues until the series' cancellation in 2009.

On June 4, 2009, Ron Frenz was the recipient of the 2009 Nemo Award for Excellence in the Cartoon Arts.

In 2017, Ron Frenz and long-time inking collaborator Sal Buscema began working on The Blue Baron, written by Darin Henry and published by Sitcomics. In 2021, Frenz also started to pencil another Sitcomics title: The Heroes Union which was written by Roger Stern.

He rejoined Tom DeFalco to co-create and pencil The R.I.G.H.T. Project for Apex Comic Group, again inked by Sal Buscema. The one-shot comic book was crowdfunded via Indiegogo and sent to its backers in February 2022.

== Bibliography ==
=== Apex Comics Group ===
- The R.I.G.H.T. Project #1 (2022)

=== Archie Comics ===
- Archie & Friends #153 (2011)
- Jughead's Double Digest #175–177 (2012)
- The Mighty Crusaders: The Lost Crusade oneshot (2015)

=== Big Bang ===
- The National Guardians #1, 3 (2012, 2023)

=== Binge Books (Sitcomics) ===
- Blue Baron #1–3 (2017–2020)
- Heroes Union #1 (2021)
- Heroes Union: The Witch and the Warriors #1 (2025)

=== Capstone Publishers ===
- John Sutter and the California Gold Rush (2006)
- Winter at Valley Forge (2006)

=== DC Comics ===
- Action Comics #759 (1999)
- The Adventures of Superman #556, 572 (1998–1999)
- Booster Gold: Futures End #1 (2014)
- The Flash Annual #3 (2014)
- Green Lantern: Emerald Warriors #13 (2011)
- Legion Lost #9–12, #0 (2011–2012)
- The Ravagers #8 (2013)
- Superboy vol. 5 #15–16 (2013)
- Superman vol. 2 #106–113, 115–120, 122–128, 131–135, 149, Annual #1–2 (1987–1988, 1995–1999)
- Superman Beyond #0 (2011)
- Superman Red/Superman Blue #1 (1998)
- Superman: Secret Files #1 (1998)
- Superman: The Man of Steel #94 (1999)
- Superman: The Wedding Album #1 (1996)
- Team 7 #1–2 (2012–2013)
- Who's Who in Star Trek #1–2 (1987)
- Who's Who in the Legion of Super-Heroes #2, 5–6 (1988)
- Who's Who: The Definitive Directory of the DC Universe #20, 24 (1986–1987)
- Who's Who: Update '87 #5 (1987)

=== Future Comics ===
- Freemind #6 (2003)

=== Hamster Press ===
- The Eye Collection (2002)

=== IDW Publishing ===
- G.I. Joe: A Real American Hero #177, 182, Annual 2012 (2012)

=== Image Comics ===
- Randy O'Donnell is the M@n #1 (flipside comic Mr. Right #0) (2001)
- Savage Dragon #200 (2014)

=== Kingstone ===
- The Christ #7 (2016)

=== Marvel Comics ===
- A-Next #1–12 (1998–1999)
- Amazing Spider-Girl #1–30 (2006–2009)
- The Amazing Spider-Man #248, 251–252, 255–261, 263, 265, 268–271, 273, 275–277, 280, 283, Annual #18, Annual '96 (1984–1986, 1996)
- The Amazing Spider-Man Family #1–2, 5–8 (2008–2009)
- The Avengers Annual #16 (1987)
- Black Knight oneshot (2010)
- Buzz #1–3 (2000)
- Captain America #290, 383, Annual #9 (1984–1991)
- Captain America vol. 3 #24 (1999)
- Captain America: Sentinel of Liberty #6–7 (1999)
- The Clone Conspiracy #1 (2016)
- D.P. 7 #21 (1988)
- Darkdevil #1–3 (2000)
- Defenders vol. 2 #4, 8–9 (2001)
- Fantastic Four #296 (1986)
- Fantastic Four Fanfare #3 (2025)
- Further Adventures of Indiana Jones #4–5 (1983)
- Hercules and the Heart of Chaos #1–3 (1997)
- Hulk #10 (2000)
- Hulk Smash Avengers #1 (2012)
- Iron Age #2 (2011)
- Iron Man #257 (1990)
- Ka-Zar the Savage #16–17, 20–22, 25–26, 29 (1982–1983)
- Kickers, Inc. #1–3 (1986–1987)
- King Conan #12 (1982)
- Magik #3 (1984)
- Many Loves of the Amazing Spider-Man #1 (2010)
- Marvel Comics #1000 (2019)
- Marvels Comics: Captain America #1 (2000)
- Marvel Knights 4 #21 (2005)
- Marvel Saga #1, 3 (1985–1986)
- Marvel Team-Up #134–136, 140, Annual #6 (1983–1984)
- The Saga of Crystar #3 (1983)
- The Sensational Spider-Man: Self-Improvement #1 (2019)
- She-Hulk #9 (2006)
- Silver Surfer #32 (1989)
- The Spectacular Spider-Man #80 (1983)
- The Spectacular Spider-Girl #1–4 (2010)
- Spider-Girl #½, 18, 32, 42, 47, 52, 57–70, 72–73, 75–79, 81–100 (1999–2006)
- Spider-Girl: The End #1 (2010)
- Spider-Island #1–5 (MC2 feature) (2015)
- Spider-Man #26 (1992)
- Spider-Man: Hobgoblin Lives #1–3 (1997)
- Spider-Man: Revenge of the Green Goblin #1–3 (2000)
- Spider-Verse Team-Up #3 (2015)
- Superior Spider-Man Team-Up #11–12 (2014)
- Star Wars #67, 71–77, 79–82, 99 (1983–1985)
- Thor vol. 1 #383–384, 386–400, 402–414, 416–430, 432–444, 447–450, 453–454, 456–459, 490, Annual #16 (1987–1995)
- Thor vol. 6 #25 (2022)
- Thor: The Worthy #1 (Thunderstrike) (2020)
- Thunderstrike #1–10, 12–24 (1993–1995)
- Thunderstrike vol. 2 #1–5 (2011)
- Untold Tales of Spider-Man #9, 25 (1996–1997)
- Venom #252 (2026)
- Web of Spider-Man vol. 2 #1–7 (Spider-Girl feature) (2009–2010)
- Webspinners: Tales of Spider-Man #17–18 (2000)
- What If...? #42, 46 (1983–1984)
- What If vol. 2 #105, 107 (1998)
- Wild Thing #0 (1999)

=== Moonstone Books ===
- Kolchak: Tales of the Night Stalker #3 (2003)
- Kolchak Tales: Ghost Stories #1 (2006)

=== MW Communications ===
- Questar Science Fiction/Fantasy Adventure vol. 4 #1 (1981)

=== Thrilling Nostalgia ===
- The Liberty Brigade #1 (2021)
- Lost Tales of the Golden Age #2 (2023)

=== Weldon Owen ===
- This Happened to Me! (anthology) (2013)

Preceded by John Romita Jr.	The Amazing Spider-Man artist 1984–1987	Succeeded by Alan Kupperberg
Preceded by Sal Buscema	Thor artist 1987–1993	Succeeded by Bruce Zick
Preceded by Tom DeFalco	Thor writer 1989–1993 (with Tom DeFalco)	Succeeded by Ron Marz and Jim Starlin
Preceded by José Luis García-López	Superman vol. 2 artist 1995–1998	Succeeded by Paul Ryan
Preceded by Pat Olliffe	Spider-Girl artist 2003–2006	Succeeded by n/a
