= Thunderstrike (character) =

Eric Masterson Thunderstrike
- Eric Masterson as Thunderstrike, taken from the variant cover of The Mighty Thor #2 (December 2015). Art by Ron Frenz.

Publication information
- Publisher: Marvel Comics
- First appearance: Thor #391 (May 1988)
- Created by: Tom DeFalco (writer); Ron Frenz (artist)

In-story information
- Team affiliations: Asgard; Avengers; Secret Defenders; Thor Corps; Legion of the Unliving
- Notable aliases: Thor
- Abilities: Formidable hand-to-hand combatant Highly skilled architect Superhuman strength, speed, agility, durability, reflexes and endurance As Thunderstrike: Flight; Dimensional travel Energy blasts

Thunderstrike is the name of two fictional characters appearing in American comic books published by Marvel Comics.

Eric Masterson has appeared as Thor and later Thunderstrike. The character was introduced as a supporting character in the Thor title, but continued in several other comic books, including the self-titled series Thunderstrike in 1993.

Later interpretations of Thunderstrike would appear in both the Marvel Comics 2 and Heroic Age Marvel Comics storylines, featuring the character's son Kevin Masterson as the hero.

== Publication history ==
Eric Masterson first appeared in Thor #391 (May 1988), as a supporting character. Thor #408 featured the merging of the character Eric Masterson with Thor, Masterson being utilized as the God of Thunder's alter ego until issue #432. Thor #432 featured the character assuming the role of Thor, and appearing as the title character until Thor #459. Following Thor #459, Masterson was introduced as "Thunderstrike" in the eponymous series starting in June 1993. The series lasted approximately two years. Thunderstrike ran for 24 issues, the series canceled in September 1995. Creator Tom DeFalco has often claimed that the book outsold Thor and The Avengers combined at the time of its cancellation; although this has been shown to be extremely unlikely. Masterson also appeared in the mini-series Thor Corps as Thunderstrike, and appeared as a guest star in the Thor series. The character was featured in the Avengers from issue #343 until issue #374, and crossover series "Operation: Galactic Storm". Masterson also appeared in the mini-series Infinity Gauntlet and Infinity War. Outside the many appearances in Thor and Avengers, Thunderstrike was used to launch an ongoing series Blackwulf, and a limited series Code: B.L.U.E.

It was announced that the Thunderstrike character would return in a new miniseries by co-creators Tom DeFalco and Ron Frenz in November 2010. Promotionals leading into the event began in August depicting the mace stating "One will rise..." and "The World Still Needs Heroes." Ultimately, the new Thunderstrike miniseries featured Eric Masterson's son Kevin Masterson in the role once inhabited by his father.

== Fictional character biography ==
=== Eric Masterson ===
==== First encounter ====
Eric Masterson was working as an architect when he met Thor. Masterson is injured by falling girders and taken to a hospital by Thor. Now on crutches, Masterson is attacked by Quicksand, but saved by Thor.

In a later incident, Masterson is mortally wounded by Mongoose. Odin merges Masterson with Thor, giving him Thor's form and powers, to save his life. Recognizing that his new life as Thor is too dangerous for a child, Masterson gives up custody of his son Kevin to his ex-wife Marcy, reasoning that Kevin would be safer with her.

==== Surrogate of Thor ====
Eric Masterson as the new Thor on the cover of Thor #433. Art by Ron Frenz

Heimdall separates Thor from Masterson, who retains his powers without being bonded to Thor. Thor gives Masterson his hammer, Mjolnir, and tells him to carry on as Earth's protector in his stead. Masterson later visits Asgard, where he battles the Warriors Three, Balder the Brave, Heimdall, and Sif while trying to discover the whereabouts of the real Thor.

The Enchantress manipulates Masterson into attacking Thor for Sif's affection. Thor defeats Masterson and reclaims Mjolnir, while Odin reveals the Enchantress's manipulations. Odin orders the creation of a new mace for Masterson, called Thunderstrike.

Thunderstrike teams with Beta Ray Bill and Dargo Ktor as the "Thor Corps" against Zarrko and Loki. During his time with the Avengers as Thor, Masterson aids them in such battles as the Kree/Shi'ar war and the Infinity Gauntlet crisis. He is one of only three heroes at the conclusion of that battle to remember the entire confrontation (the other two being Doctor Strange and the Silver Surfer).

Masterson creates his own costume to distinguish himself from Thor, while keeping Thor's reputation intact. He renames himself Thunderstrike, after the mace itself, operating as an adventurer and crimefighter. Masterson defeats Bloodaxe, only to discover that Bloodaxe is actually Jackie Lukus, his love interest at the time.

==== Final conflicts and death ====
After a battle with the god Seth, Masterson realizes that the only way to defeat him is to succumb to the Bloodaxe's curse and increase his strength. After apparently killing Seth, Masterson is confronted by the Avengers, who attempt to arrest him for murder. Masterson defeats the Avengers, but is confronted by Thor. Masterson is forced to fight the Bloodaxe subconsciously, which manifests in the form of Skurge. Masterson defeats the Skurge duplicate, causing a psychic backlash that kills himself and destroys the Bloodaxe and Thunderstrike.

=== Kevin Masterson ===
Kevin Masterson (Eric Masterson's son) first appeared in Thor #392 (June 1988).

An embittered adolescent, Kevin is featured in the 2011 Thunderstrike limited series. The character previously featured as an idealistic child is shown to have anger, behavioral problems, and disillusioned outlook on "spandex-covered glory hounds." He is given his father's enchanted mace by Commander Steve Rogers but, to their mutual disappointment, it does not transform him. On his way home, however, Kevin tries to save a mother and child from Rhino and is transformed. Kevin accepts his new identity as Thunderstrike, along with a new image, and continues his adventures under the mentorship of the Valkyrie Gruenhilda.

During the Fear Itself storyline, Thunderstrike ends up teleported onto a station in the middle of the Pacific Ocean with Amadeus Cho, X-23, Spider-Girl, and Power Man. They end up fighting a bunch of samurai Shark Men. Kevin briefly appeared as part of the new class of students when the Avengers Academy moves to the former headquarters of the West Coast Avengers. He later joins the Asgardians of the Galaxy.

== Powers and abilities ==
Thunderstrike's abilities are derived from the enchanted mace of the same name. In Thunderstrike's human form, the mace appears as a wooden cane. The mace itself can be thrown over great distances and return to the point it is thrown from. By throwing the mace and gripping the strap, Thunderstrike can fly. The mace magically enables him to survive the adverse conditions of outer space, including its lack of oxygen. The mace can also be used for tracking various energy sources and has the ability to create mystical vortices to travel from one place to another. Thunderstrike's physical abilities are enhanced to superhuman levels, including his strength, speed, durability, agility, reflexes, and endurance.

Kevin Masterson manifests the same powers as his father when using his mace, but learned to make his appearance as Thunderstrike a modified form of his own visage. In the MC2 universe, he has the same powers, but he is not reliant upon the mace.

== Other versions ==
In the Marvel Comics 2 alternative universe, Kevin Masterson is a founding member of A-Next after absorbing the powers of the Thunderstrike mace. When Galactus destroys Asgard, Thunderstrike seemingly loses his powers in Last Planet Standing. He is kidnapped by Ulik and Sylene, daughter of Loki, as part of a plan to restore Asgard; but Kevin Masterson struggles against his captors. Ultimately he is responsible for turning the tables on the villains. Thena, daughter of Thor, who had also taken part in the battle against her cousin, is able to restore Kevin's power, allowing him to become Thunderstrike once again.

== In other media ==
=== Television ===
Eric Masterson / Thunderstrike makes a non-speaking appearance in the Avengers Assemble episode "Into the Future" as part of a resistance against Kang the Conqueror in a possible alternate future. Additionally, the Thunderstrike moniker is used by Jane Foster in the present day.

=== Video games ===
- Eric Masterson / Thunderstrike makes a non-speaking cameo appearance in Spider-Man and Venom: Maximum Carnage.
- Eric Masterson / Thunderstrike appears as a playable character in Avengers in Galactic Storm.
- Eric Masterson / Thunderstrike appears as a playable character in Lego Marvel's Avengers.

== Collected editions ==
| Title | Character | Material collected | Published date | ISBN |
|---|---|---|---|---|
| Thor: Thunderstrike | Eric Masterson | Thor #431-433 and #457-459, material from #408, and Thunderstrike #1. | June 2011 | 978-0785156383 |
| Thunderstrike: Youth in Revolt | Kevin Masterson | Thunderstrike (vol. 2) #1-5 and material from Thor Spotlight | June 2011 | 978-0785152712 |
