= Marvel Comics 2 =

Marvel Comics imprint

- Parent company: Marvel Comics
- Founded: 1998
- Defunct: 2011
- Country of origin: United States
- Official website: www.marvel.com

Marvel Comics 2 was an imprint from Marvel Comics whose comic books depict an alternative future timeline for the Marvel Universe. The imprint was spun off from the events of What If? #105 (February 1998), which was the first appearance of the character Spider-Girl, Spider-Man's daughter from an alternative future. This Earth has been designated as Earth-982.

== Publication history ==
The MC2 Universe's superheroes, based on the Marvel Comics' main canon's characters. Cover art of Avengers Next #1 (November 2006). Art by Mike Wieringo.

The MC2 Universe was conceived by writer/editor Tom DeFalco as a possible alternate future for the Marvel Universe, set in the present day, with the first appearances of most Marvel heroes having taken place fifteen years earlier than in main continuity. The goal of the line was to produce comic books that were more accessible to a wider audience than Marvel's main line of books and were not entrenched in years of continuity, which was later repeated with the Ultimate Marvel imprint.

Three MC2 titles were launched in October 1998 as twelve-issue maxiseries:

- Spider-Girl, starring the daughter of Spider-Man.
- A-Next, featuring a new team of Avengers who come together after the original Avengers disbanded.
- J2, starring the Juggernaut's son, a heroic teenager.

A-Next and J2 ended after twelve issues and were replaced by:

- Fantastic Five, featuring the expanded Fantastic Four.
- Wild Thing, starring Wolverine and Elektra's daughter.

Spider-Girl meanwhile continued publication. However, with the collapse of a deal to sell the comics in Kmart and Target both Fantastic Five and Wild Thing were canceled after five issues, leaving Spider-Girl as the only title in the MC2 Universe still published. A few spin-off limited series were launched during the time Spider-Girl was published, such as Darkdevil and Spider-Girl Presents The Buzz.

The Spider-Girl title was nearly canceled several times due to low sales. Each time, campaigns by Tom DeFalco and fans of the title prevented cancelation. Fans created a webpage, savespidergirl.com, to help gain support for the book. In an effort to boost sales on the title, Marvel reprinted Spider-Girl in small "Digest-sized" trade paperbacks.

A five-issue limited series set in the MC2 Universe titled Last Hero Standing was printed. In 2006, Marvel released another limited series set in the MC2 Universe titled Last Planet Standing. The series was intended to wrap up all the loose ends in the MC2 Universe and destroy it at the series' conclusion. As a result, Spider-Girl was slated to be canceled at issue 100, where the character would die. Due to backlash from DeFalco and fans, Marvel quashed the move and announced the relaunching of Spider-Girl under the title of Amazing Spider-Girl. The "Amazing" title lasted until early 2009, when the book was again canceled due to low sales. A third title, The Spectacular Spider-Girl, was then launched. Initially a digital exclusive, the Spectacular book was incorporated into the Amazing Spider-Man Family anthology magazine. After Amazing Spider-Man Family and its successor, Web of Spider-Man, folded, a final four-issue Spectacular Spider-Girl mini-series was produced, allowing many of the long-running plot threads from the book to be tied up. The final MC2-oriented story to date, a one-shot called Spider-Girl: The End, was published in 2010, which gave the title character a happy ending while leaving the door open for further adventures.

In 2008, a prequel strip, Mr. and Mrs. Spider-Man, was launched in the pages of Amazing Spider-Man Family. DeFalco confirmed on the official Spider-Girl boards that this strip would serve as the definitive continuity of the MC2 Spider-Man timeline. However, the Mr. and Mrs. Spider-Man strips were quickly ended so the Spider-Man Family title could make room for the relaunched Spider-Girl book.

American Dream has appeared in both her own 2008 limited series and the 2011 five-issue limited series Captain America Corps, marking the first time an MC2 character has met or teamed up with characters from the mainstream Marvel universe.

Spider-Girl returns in the Spider-Verse storyline in 2014, where she enters Earth-616. During Spider-Verse, the MC2 Peter Parker is killed by Daemos. Following Spider-Geddon, it is revealed that the Other chose Peter as its host, thus resurrecting him.

The MC2 Universe also appears in the Secret Wars event in the Spider-Island tie-in backup. In late 2022, a new serialized adventure starring Mayday was launched on the Marvel Unlimited Infinity Comics app, with the story penned by Stephanie Williams, rather than DeFalco, a first for the series.

In 2023, DeFalco and Frenz reunited for a new A-Next story in Avengers Unlimited Infinity Comic that details the team's first adventure.

== Comments on style ==
DeFalco explained in an interview his views on the MC2 imprint:

The Pulse: "A lot of people characterize the MC2 universe as having an 'old school' feel. Why do you think "modern" comic readers want to read something that feels like the best of the Silver Age?" DeFalco: "We are 'old school' because A) our heroes act like heroes…B) we don't believe in decompression…C) we tell single-issue stories with subplots that build from issue to issue… and D) there's a lot of action and angst in every issue."

== Bibliography ==
=== Titles ===
- What If (volume 2) #105 (Marvel Comics, February 1998)
- Spider-Girl #0–100, (Marvel Comics, October 1998 – July 2006)
  - Spider-Girl #½ (Marvel Comics/Wizard Entertainment, 1999)
  - Spider-Girl Annual 1999 (Marvel Comics, 1999)
- A-Next #1–12 (Marvel Comics, October 1998 – September 1999)
- J2 #1–12 (Marvel Comics, October 1998 – September 1999)
- Fantastic Five (volume 1) #1–5 (Marvel Comics, October 1999 – February 2000)
- Wild Thing #1–5 (Marvel Comics, October 1999 – February 2000)
  - Wild Thing #0 (Marvel Comics/Wizard Entertainment, 1999)
- Spider-Girl presents The Buzz #1–3 (Marvel Comics, July 2000 – September 2000)
- DarkDevil #1–3 (Marvel Comics, November 2000 – January 2001)
- Last Hero Standing #1–5 (Marvel Comics, June 2005)
- Last Planet Standing #1–5 (Marvel Comics, July 2006)
- Amazing Spider-Girl #0–30 (Marvel Comics, October 2006 – March 2009)
- Amazing Spider-Man Magazine "#0" (prose story, Marvel Comics, April 2007)
- Avengers Next #1–5 (Marvel Comics, November 2006 – January 2007)
- Fantastic Five (volume 2) #1–5 (Marvel Comics, July 2007 – September 2007)
- American Dream #1–5 (Marvel Comics, May 2008 – July 2008)
- Amazing Spider-Man Family #1-8 (Marvel Comics, October 2008 - September 2009)
- Web of Spider-Man (volume 2) #1-7 (Marvel Comics, December 2009 - June 2010)
- Spectacular Spider-Girl #1–4 (Marvel Comics, May 2010 – August 2010)
- Spider-Girl: The End One shot (Marvel Comics, September 2010)
- Captain America Corps #1-5 (Marvel Comics, June 2011)
- Amazing Spider-Man (volume 3) #8 (backup story, Marvel Comics, 2014)
- Spider-Verse Team-Up #3 (backup story, Marvel Comics, 2015)
- Spider-Island (2015) #1–5 (backup stories, Marvel Comics, 2015)
- Spider-Girls #1–3 (Marvel Comics, 2018)
- Spider-Verse Unlimited Infinity Comic #26-29 (Marvel Comics, November-December 2022)
- Avengers Unlimited Infinity Comic #37-38 (Marvel Comics, March 2023)

== Collected editions ==
Title	Material collected	ISBN	Release date
Spider-Girl: A Fresh Start	Spider-Girl #1–2	978-0785107200	1998-31-12
Spider-Girl	Spider-Girl #0–8	978-0785108153	2001-05-11
Last Hero Standing	Last Hero Standing #0–5	978-0785118237	2005-12-10
Last Planet Standing	Last Planet Standing #0–5	978-0785119982	2006-18-10
Amazing Spider-Girl vol. 1: Whatever Happened to the Daughter of Spider-Man?	The Amazing Spider-Girl #0–6	978-0785123415	2007-30-05
Avengers Next: Rebirth	Avengers Next #1–5	978-0785125181	2007-13-06
Amazing Spider-Girl vol. 2: Comes the Carnage!	The Amazing Spider-Girl #7–12	978-0785123422	2007-28-11
Fantastic Five: The Final Doom	Fantastic Five vol. 2 #1–5	978-0785127925	2008-09-01
Amazing Spider-Girl vol. 3: Mind Games	The Amazing Spider-Girl #13–18	978-0785125587	2008-28-05
American Dream: Beyond Courage	American Dream #1–5	978-0785131847	2008-15-10
Amazing Spider-Girl vol. 4: Brand New May	The Amazing Spider-Girl #19–24	978-0785129745	2008-24-12
Amazing Spider-Girl vol. 5: Maybreak	The Amazing Spider-Girl #25-30	978-0785131878	2009-01-07
Spectacular Spider-Girl: Who Killed Gwen Reilly?	Spider-Man Family #1–8, Web of Spider-Man #1–4	978-0785143192	2010-24-03
Spectacular Spider-Girl: The Last Stand	Spectacular Spider-Girl #1–4, Spider-Girl: The End, and material from Web of Spider-Man #5–7	978-0785148999	2010-24-03
Captain America Corps	Captain America Corps #1-5	978-0785155638	2011-21-12
Spider-Girl: The Complete Collection Vol. 1	What If? (1989) #105, Spider-Girl #1-15 and #½, Spider-Girl Annual '99	978-1302912482	2018-07-08
Spider-Girl: The Complete Collection Vol. 2	Spider-Girl #16-32	978-1302918446	2019-06-08
Spider-Girl: The Complete Collection Vol. 3	Spider-Girl #33-50	978-1302923716	2021-30-03
Spider-Girl: The Complete Collection Vol. 4	Spider-Girl #51-67	978-1302934798	2022-12-04

=== Digest size paperbacks ===
Title	Material collected	ISBN	Release date
Spider-Girl vol. 1: Legacy	Spider-Girl #0–5	978-0785114413	2004-01-04
Spider-Girl vol. 2: Like Father Like Daughter	Spider-Girl #6–11	978-0785116578	2004-15-12
Spider-Girl vol. 3: Avenging Allies	Spider-Girl #12–16 &Spider-Girl Annual '99	978-0785116585	2005-13-04
Spider-Girl vol. 4: Turning Point	Spider-Girl #17–21 and #½	978-0785118718	2005-21-09
Spider-Girl vol. 5: Endgame	Spider-Girl #22-27	978-0785120346	2006-25-01
Spider-Girl Presents Juggernaut Jr vol. 1: Secrets and Lies	J2 #1-6	978-0785120476	2006-29-03
Spider-Girl vol. 6: Too Many Spiders!	Spider-Girl #28-33	978-0785121565	2006-21-06
Spider-Girl Presents A-Next vol. 1: Second Coming	A-Next #1-6	978-0785121312	2006-23-08
Spider-Girl Presents Fantastic Five vol. 1: In Search of Doom	Fantastic Five #1-5	978-0785121329	2006-20-09
Spider-Girl vol. 7: Betrayed	Spider-Girl #34-38	978-0785121572	2006-15-11
Spider-Girl vol. 8: Duty Calls	Spider-Girl #39-44	978-0785124955	2007-18-04
Spider-Girl Presents The Buzz” and “DarkDevil	The Buzz #1–3, DarkDevil #1–3	978-0785126010	2007-05-09
Spider-Girl vol. 9: Secret Lives	Spider-Girl #45-50	978-0785126027	2007-31-10
Spider-Girl Presents Wild Thing Crash Course	Wild Thing #0–5	978-0785126065	2007-05-12
Spider-Girl vol. 10: Season of the Serpent	Spider-Girl #52-59	978-0785132134	2009-11-02
Spider-Girl vol. 11: Marked for Death	Spider-Girl #60-66	978-0785137412	2009-08-12
Spider-Girl vol. 12: The Games Villains Play	Spider-Girl #67-72	978-0785144823	2010-24-03

=== Epic Collections ===
Title	Material collected	ISBN	Release date
Spider-Girl vol. 1: Legacy	What If? (1989) #105, Spider-Girl #1-15 and #½, Spider-Girl Annual '99	978-1302957957	2024-26-03
Spider-Girl vol. 5: Keeping The Faith	Spider-Girl #68-84	978-1302959821	2024-19-11
Spider-Girl vol. 6: Family Ties	Spider-Girl #85-100; Spider-Man Family #1	978-1302966089	2025-18-11
Spider-Girl vol. 7: Comes the Carnage!	The Amazing Spider-Girl #0-15	978-1302969776	2026-18-08
