= Pat Olliffe =

American comic book artist and penciller

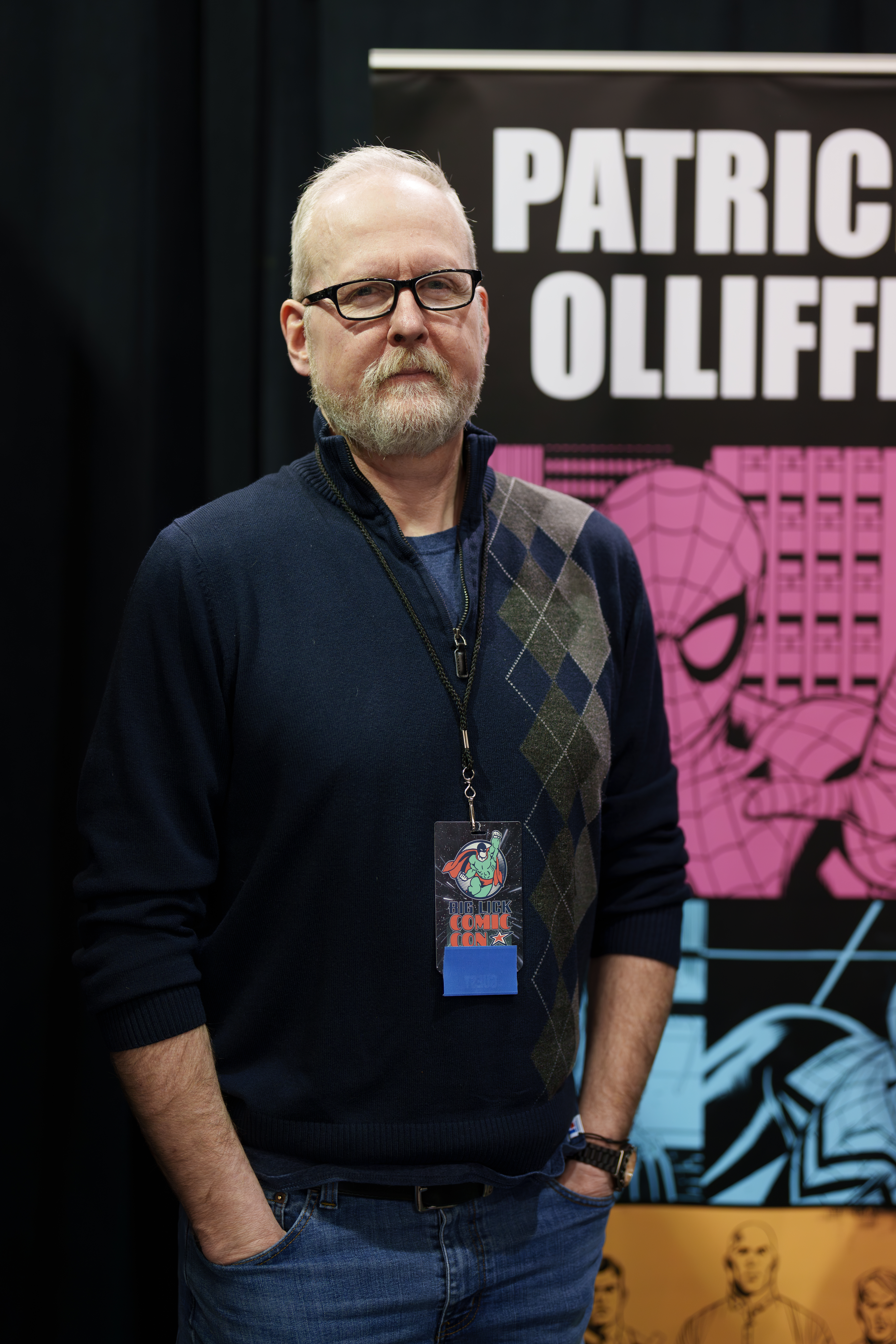
- Ollife at Big Lick Comic Con in Roanoke, Virginia in 2026
- Born: Patrick Olliffe
- Area: Artist
- Notable works: Untold Tales of Spider-Man; Spider-Girl

Patrick Olliffe is an American comic book artist and penciller. His most notable clients include Marvel Comics, DC Comics, Disney Publishing, and AfterShock Comics.

== Career ==
Olliffe is known for his work for Marvel Comics on Untold Tales of Spider-Man (1995) and Spider-Girl (1998).

He is also a published author and an illustrator of children's books and young adult books. Some of the published credits include Spider-Girl Volume 8: Duty Calls Digest (Spider-Girl), Spider-Man: Saga of the Sandman, JSA Classified: Honor Among Thieves, and Avengers: Galactic Storm, Vol. 2. Other titles he has worked on include New Excalibur (2007), Last Planet Standing (2006), Last Hero Standing (2005), Nomad (1992), Thor (1991) and Warlock and the Infinity Watch (1994).

At DC Comics, he worked on a three-issue arc of JSA Classified with Jen Van Meter, was part of the artist rotation for 52, and worked on 52 Aftermath: The Four Horsemen with Keith Giffen.

== Bibliography ==
Spider-Girl #53 cover. Art by Olliffe

- The Amazing Spider-Man (1963)
- Thor (1966)
- Hero Alliance (1989)
- Sensational She-Hulk (1989)
- Nomad (1992)
- Warlock and the Infinity Watch (1992)
- Untold Tales of Spider-Man (1995)
- Marvel Team-Up (1997)
- Unlimited Access (1997)
- Dracula: Lord of the Undead (1998)
- Spider-Girl (1998)
- Kolchak: Tales of the Night Stalker (2003)
- Namor (2003)
- Firestorm (2004)
- Last Hero Standing (2005)
- Legion of Super-Heroes (2005)
- JSA: Classified (2005)
- All New Atom (2006)
- 52 (2006)
- Last Planet Standing (2006)
- Ms. Marvel (2006)
- New Excalibur (2006)
- 52 Aftermath: The Four Horsemen (2007)
- Booster Gold (2007)
- Captain Britain and MI: 13 (2008)
- Edgeworld: Sand (2020)
