= Spider-Girl (comic book) =

Comic book series featuring Marvel character Spider-Girl

- Cover of Spider-Girl vol. 1 #0 (October 1998). Art by Ron Frenz and Matt Webb.

Publication information
- Publisher: Marvel Comics
- Schedule: Monthly
- Format: Ongoing series
- Genre: Superhero
- Publication date: October 1998 – September 2011
- No. of issues: List: Featuring May Parker : Spider-Girl Vol 1: 104 plus one Annual; Amazing Spider-Girl Vol 1: 31; Spectacular Spider-Girl Vol 1: 10; Spectacular Spider-Girl Vol 2: 4; Spider-Girl: The End!: 1; Spider-Island Vol 1: 5; Featuring Anya Corazon: Araña: The Heart of the Spider Vol 1: 12; Amazing Fantasy Vol 2: 20; Spider-Island: The Amazing Spider-Girl Vol 1: 2; Spider-Girl Vol 2: 8; Featuring Maka Akana: Spider-Girl Vol 3: 7

Creative team
- Written by: List: Tom DeFalco; Fiona Avery; Mark Waid; Paul Tobin
- Penciller: List: Pat Olliffe; Ron Frenz; Mark Brooks; Pepe Larraz; Matthew Southworth
- Inker: List: Christie Scheele; Gloria Vasquez; Avalon Studios; Guy Major; Andrew Crossley

Spider-Girl is the name of several comic book titles featuring the character Spider-Girl and published by Marvel Comics, beginning with the original Spider-Girl comic book series which debuted in 1998.

== Publication history ==
The first portrayed Spider-Girl, Mayday Parker, first appeared in a one-shot story in the ongoing series What If. Following positive fan response to the concept, Spider-Girl and two other series (A-Next and J2) set in the same alternate future universe were launched under the MC2 imprint. Although each of these titles were slated to be 12-issue limited series, Spider-Girl's initial sales justified their continuation as ongoing titles.

After initial interest, Spider-Girl drew low sales. The book's active fan base convinced Marvel to revoke several cancellation announcements. Reprints of the series in digest size trade paperbacks sold well. Marvel Associate Editor Nick Lowe revealed in a Nov. 2005 interview that "Spider-Girl, for the first time, is completely safe from cancellation."

Despite Lowe's statement, Marvel announced that No. 100 would be the title's final issue. It was the longest-running superhero book with a lead female character ever published by Marvel. The book was relaunched as The Amazing Spider-Girl, with issue #0 appearing in Oct. 2006.

In November 2010, a new Spider-Girl series was launched that was unconnected to the MC2 universe. The new series featured a new character, Anya Corazon, whose adventures occurred on Earth 616. This monthly Spider-Girl comic debuted on November 17, 2010, as a tie-in to the "Big Time" storyline in The Amazing Spider-Man. The series was canceled after only eight issues, and was collected with the subtitle Family Values. No official reason was given for the cancellation.

In June 2025, Spider-Girl vol. 3 was announced as a spin-off of Spider-Boy vol. 2, following Maka Akana, the former supervillain Funhouse and the protégé of Bullseye as she is stuck with the powers of Spider-Boy after aiming to become his nemesis. The series was canceled after only seven issues, and was collected with the subtitle Breath Through the Fire. No official reason was given for the cancellation.

== Collected editions ==
=== Mayday Parker ===
Title	Material collected	ISBN	Release date
Spider-Girl: A Fresh Start	Spider-Girl #1–2	978-0785107200	December 31, 1998
Spider-Girl	Spider-Girl #0–8	978-0785108153	November 5, 2001
Vol. 1: Legacy	Spider-Girl #0–5	978-0785114413	April 1, 2004
Vol. 2: Like Father, Like Daughter	Spider-Girl #6–11	978-0785116578	December 15, 2004
Vol. 3: Avenging Allies	Spider-Girl #12–16 and Spider-Girl Annual '99	978-0785116585	April 13, 2005
Vol. 4: Turning Point	Spider-Girl #17–21 and Spider-Girl #½	978-0785118718	September 21, 2005
Vol. 5: Endgame	Spider-Girl #22–27	978-0785120346	January 25, 2006
Vol. 6: Too Many Spiders!	Spider-Girl #28–33	978-0785121565	June 21, 2006
Vol. 7: Betrayed	Spider-Girl #34–38 and #51	978-0785121572	November 15, 2006
Vol. 8: Duty Calls	Spider-Girl #39–44	978-0785124955	April 18, 2007
Vol. 9: Secret Lives	Spider-Girl #45–50	978-0785126027	October 31, 2007
Vol. 10: Season of the Serpent	Spider-Girl #52–59	978-0785132134	February 11, 2009
Vol. 11: Marked for Death	Spider-Girl #60–66	978-0785137412	December 8, 2009
Vol. 12: The Games Villains Play	Spider-Girl #67–72	978-0785144823	March 24, 2010
Vol. 13: When Destiny Calls!	Spider-Girl #73–79	978-0785145110	September 15, 2010
Vol. 14: Inside the Beast	Spider-Girl #80–84	978-0785145776	December 1, 2010
Vol. 15: Family Business	Spider-Girl #85–88	978-0785149484	February 25, 2011
Vol. 16: Shadows from the Past!	Spider-Girl #89–96	978-0785192398	April 17, 2011
Vol. 18: If Death Be My Destiny!	Spider-Girl #97–100	978-0785194378	May 7, 2011
Spider-Girl: The Complete Collection Vol. 1: Legacy	What If? (1989) #105, Spider-Girl #1–15 and Spider-Girl #½, and Spider-Girl Annual '99	978-1302912482	August 7, 2018
Spider-Girl Modern Era Epic Collection Vol. 1: Legacy	What If? (1989) #105, Spider-Girl #1–15 and Spider-Girl #½, and Spider-Girl Annual '99	978-1302957957	March 26, 2024
Spider-Girl: The Complete Collection Vol. 2	Spider-Girl #16–32	978-1302918446	August 6, 2019
Spider-Girl: The Complete Collection Vol. 3	Spider-Girl #33–50	978-1302923716	March 30, 2021
Spider-Girl: The Complete Collection Vol. 4	Spider-Girl #51–67	978-1302934798	April 12, 2022
Spider-Girl Modern Era Epic Collection Vol. 5: Keeping the Faith	Spider-Girl #68–84	978-1302959821	November 19, 2024
Spider-Girl Modern Era Epic Collection Vol. 6: Family Ties	Spider-Girl #85–99 and material from #100 and Spider-Man Family #1	978-1302966089	November 18, 2025
Spider-Girl Modern Era Epic Collection Vol. 7: Comes The Carnage!	The Amazing Spider-Girl #0-15	978-1302969776	August 18, 2026
Vol. 1: Whatever Happened to the Daughter of Spider-Man?	The Amazing Spider-Girl #0–6	978-0785123415	May 30, 2007
Vol. 2: Comes the Carnage!	The Amazing Spider-Girl #7–12	978-0785123422	November 28, 2007
Vol. 3: Mind Games	The Amazing Spider-Girl #13–18	978-0785125587	May 28, 2008
Vol. 4: Brand New May	The Amazing Spider-Girl #19–24	978-0785129745	December 24, 2008
Vol. 5: Maybreak	The Amazing Spider-Girl #25–30	978-0785131878	July 1, 2009
Spectacular Spider-Girl: Who Killed Gwen Reilly?	Spectacular Spider-Girl #1–7 (Spider-Man Family #1–8 and Web of Spider-Man #1–4)	978-0785143192	March 24, 2010
Spectacular Spider-Girl: The Last Stand	Spectacular Spider-Girl #8–11, Spider-Girl: The End, and material from Web of Spider-Man #5–7	978-0785148999	March 24, 2010
Spider-Island: Warzones!	Spider-Island #1–5	978-0785198857	November 26, 2015
Web Warriors: Protectors of the Spider-Verse – Electroverse	Web Warriors #1–5 and material from The Amazing Spider-Man (2015) #1	978-1302486341	May 11, 2016
Web Warriors: Protectors of the Spider-Verse – Spiders vs.	Web Warriors #6–11	978-1302495121	December 27, 2016
Spider-Geddon: Covert Ops	Spider-Force #1–3 and Spider-Girls #1–3	978-1302914974	February 27, 2019
Spider-Verse/Spider-Geddon Omnibus	Edge of Spider-Verse #1–5; Spider-Verse (2014) #1–2; The Superior Spider-Man (2013) #32–33; The Amazing Spider-Man (2014) #7–15; Spider-Man 2099 (2014) #5–8; Scarlet Spiders #1–3; Spider-Woman (2014) #1–4; Spider-Verse Team-Up #1-3; Edge Of Spider-Geddon #1-4; Spider-Geddon #0–5; Superior Octopus #1; Spider-Force #1–3; Spider-Girls #1–3; Peter Parker, The Spectacular Spider-Man (2017) #311–313; Spider-Gwen: Ghost Spider #1–4; Vault Of Spiders #1–2; Spider-Geddon: Spider-Man Noir Video Comic; Spider-Geddon: Spider-Gwen – Ghost Spider Video Comic; Spider-Geddon: Spider-Man Video Comic; Spider-Geddon Handbook, and material from Free Comic Book Day 2014 (Guardians Of The Galaxy)	978-1302947422	September 14, 2022

=== Anya Corazon ===
Title	Material collected	ISBN	Release date
Spider-Girl Vol. 1: Family Values	Spider-Girl (vol. 2) #1–8 and Amazing Spider-Man #648	ISBN 978-0785146940	September 14, 2011
Spider-Island: Companion	The Amazing Spider-Girl (vol. 2) #1–3, Spider-Island: Cloak & Dagger #1–3, Spider-Island: Deadly Hands of Kung Fu #1–3, Herc #7–8, Spider-Island: Avengers #1, Spider-Island: Spider-Woman #1, Spider-Island: I Love New York City, Black Panther #524, and Spider-Island: Heroes For Hire #1	ISBN 978-0785162285 (hardcover); ISBN 978-0785162292 (softcover)	February 29, 2012

=== Maka Akana ===
Title	Material collected	ISBN	Release date
Spider-Girl Vol. 1: Breath Through the Fire	Spider-Girl (vol. 3) #1–7	ISBN 978-1302964702	March 24, 2026
