= Spider-Girl (disambiguation) =

Spider-Girl or Spidergirl may refer to:

- Anya Corazon, a Marvel Comics Latina superhero who originally called herself Araña.
- Ashley Barton, a Marvel Comics antihero and granddaughter of Spider-Man Peter Parker and daughter of Clint Barton from the Marvel's Wastelanders universe.
- Gwen Warren, a Marvel Comics superhero and mutant biological daughter of Cyclops Scott Summers, Gwen Stacy, and Spider-Queen Ana Soria, created by Miles Warren.
- Mayday Parker, a Marvel Comics superhero and daughter of Spider-Man Peter Parker and Mary Jane Watson from the MC2 (Marvel Comics 2) universe.
- Petra Parker, an alternate universe superhero who appears in Ultimate Spider-Man, voiced by Olivia Holt.
- Spider Girl (Sussa Paka), a DC Comics superhero
- Spider Girls (born 1969/70), Indian conjoined twins

== See also ==
- Spider-Woman
- SP//dr
- Silk
