= Mayday Parker =

Superheroine in Marvel Comics' MC2 universe

Mayday Parker Spider-Girl
- May "Mayday" Parker as Spider-Girl, as she appeared on the cover of The Amazing Spider-Girl #1 (December 2006). Art by Ron Frenz.

Publication information
- First appearance: What If #105 (February 1998)
- Created by: Tom DeFalco (writer); Ron Frenz (artist)

In-story information
- Alter ego: May "Mayday" Parker
- Species: Human mutate
- Place of origin: Queens, New York, Earth-982
- Team affiliations: A-Next; Fantastic Five; New Warriors; Web Warriors
- Notable aliases: Spidey, Spider-Girl Red, Spider-Woman
- Abilities: Superhuman strength, speed, agility, stamina, durability, reflexes/reaction and endurance; Precognitive spider-sense, ability to stick to any surface and webbing ability; Bio-magnetism manipulation; Ability to sense the weak points in her enemies, and repel objects and people

Spider-Girl (May "Mayday" Parker) is a superheroine appearing in American comic books published by Marvel Comics. She has been referred to as both Spider-Girl and Spider-Woman. The character appears in the MC2 universe. The character was created by Tom DeFalco and Ron Frenz as the teenage daughter of Peter Parker (Spider-Man) and Mary Jane Watson, and first appeared in What If #105 (February 1998). She later acquired her own ongoing comic book, Spider-Girl, written by DeFalco and drawn by Frenz and Pat Olliffe, which was the longest-running superhero book with a lead female character ever published by Marvel. The title was relaunched as The Amazing Spider-Girl and later The Spectacular Spider-Girl. The character would then return in a supporting role in the event series Spider-Verse, Web Warriors, Spider-Girls, Spider-Geddon, End of the Spider-Verse, and Spider-Boy, and in a starring role in the digital series Unlimited Spider-Girl.

The character made her cinematic debut in the 2023 feature film Spider-Man: Across the Spider-Verse, voiced by Michelle Ruff, with an infant Mayday depicted as the daughter of Peter B. Parker and his universe's Mary Jane Watson.

== Publication history ==
Spider-Girl first appeared in a one-shot story in the ongoing series What If. Following positive fan response to the concept, Spider-Girl and two other series (A-Next and J2) set in the same alternate future universe were launched under the MC2 imprint. Although each of these titles were slated to be 12-issue limited series, Spider-Girl's initial sales justified their continuation as ongoing titles.

After initial interest, Spider-Girl drew low sales. The book's active fan base convinced Marvel to revoke several cancellation announcements. Reprints of the series in digest size trade paperbacks sold well. Marvel Associate Editor Nick Lowe revealed in a Nov. 2005 interview that "Spider-Girl, for the first time, is completely safe from cancellation."

Despite Lowe's statement, Marvel announced that No. 100 would be the title's final issue. The book was relaunched as The Amazing Spider-Girl, with issue #0 appearing in Oct. 2006.

On October 11, 2008, Tom DeFalco announced that The Amazing Spider-Girl would be canceled with issue #30, though he revealed that, due to the company's love for the character, she could possibly be given a sixteen-page back-up strip in The Amazing Spider-Man Family. On November 8, 2008, Marvel EIC Joe Quesada confirmed that Spider-Girl would become a feature in the monthly anthology magazine Amazing Spider-Man Family. The series would replace the feature Mr. and Mrs. Spider-Man, written by DeFalco, which served as a prequel series to the Spider-Girl universe.

On March 18, 2009, Marvel announced that Spider-Girl would continue publication as The Spectacular Spider-Girl, a web-comic released through Marvel's Digital Comics Unlimited. The title would continue to be simultaneously published in paper form within Amazing Spider-Man Family. The Amazing Spider-Man Family #5 (published April 2009) through No. 8 (July 2009) contained these Spider-Girl stories until the title's cancellation with issue #8.

The new The Spectacular Spider-Girl stories were then contained in Web of Spider-Man. This lasted for seven issues, completing the storyline Who Killed Gwen Reilly?, before being moved to its own four-issue limited series, Spectacular Spider-Girl, which tied up most of the series plot threads (the earlier stories republished as The Spectacular Spider-Girl #1–7, the remaining four being Spectacular Spider-Girl #8–11). This was followed by one last Spider-Girl tale, Spider-Girl: The End, collected as Spider-Girl: The Last Stand.

Mayday and her family were reintroduced, as part of the Spider-Verse crossover event, in the eighth issue of the third volume of The Amazing Spider-Man, which was the first story with Mayday to be written by Dan Slott, the first time a fully-grown Mayday appeared in the pages of her father's flagship title, and the first story to highlight the "Spider-Marriage" in the regular comics since 2007's controversial One More Day.

She appeared again, handled by the original creative team, in July 2015 as part of Marvel's Secret Wars event, serving as a backup story in Christos Gage's Spider-Island. She also returned for the sequel event to Spider-Verse, Spider-Geddon. Shortly after her father reunited with her family in End of the Spider-Verse, Mayday reverted back to her original Spider-Girl codename. In November 2022, a new serialized adventure starring Mayday was launched on the Marvel Unlimited Infinity Comics app, Unlimited Spider-Girl, with the story penned by Stephanie Williams. She and her family also returned in the 2025 graphic novel Spider-Boy: The Dragon's Challenge, Mayday and her father both active as Spider-Girl and Spider-Man at the same time.

== Fictional character biography ==
May "Mayday" Parker is the daughter of Peter and Mary Jane Parker and the great-niece of Aunt May in the future, alternate universe continuity. Peter and Mary Jane named their daughter after his Aunt May. In the MC2 continuity, they were reunited with their baby girl by Kaine, who found the child living with Alison Mongraine, the con artist who had kidnapped the baby on instruction from the Green Goblin. After they were reunited, Peter lost a leg during the horrific final conflict with the Green Goblin. After the battle, Peter was offered a bionic replacement from Mister Fantastic but, considering it a wake-up call, decided to retire and focus on being a husband and father (the battle is glimpsed in Spider Girl #7, and fully explained in Spider Girl #49). For years, they chose to keep their past from May and hoped that she wouldn't develop powers of her own.

Despite her parents' hopes, May began developing versions of her father's spider-powers when she was 15. At the same time, Normie Osborn, grandson of the original Green Goblin, set out to restore the family name. May donned Ben Reilly's Spider-Man costume to stop him and soon took to crime-fighting, at first hindered, then helped, by her worried real parents.

May shares traits of both of her parents. Like her mother, she is a beautiful, charismatic, and popular student in her high school, and she is intelligent and talented just like her father. She also inherited his love for in-fight bantering and his intolerance for injustice. Even without her spider powers, she is a very good athlete and excelled in her girls' basketball team until she quit, her resignation coming after the manifestation of her powers. On the one hand, May seems to have inherited the "Parker luck" in which her dual identity wreaks havoc in her private life. On the other hand, her superhero career, unlike her father's, begins with her successfully protecting her family. From the early part of her career onward, Spider-Girl has developed a reputation for avoiding unnecessary battles with anyone and reforming her former adversaries, like Normie Osborn and Raptor. Spider-Girl quickly establishes herself in the superhero community and gets along with other superheroes easily, gaining reserve status in the Avengers and allies in the New Warriors and Fantastic Five.

In The Amazing Spider-Girl, May promises to give up costumed super-heroics, dates Eugene Thompson, and runs for student council. When Mary Jane becomes aware that the Hobgoblin poses a threat to her goddaughter's teenage friends, she allows May to resume her activities as Spider-Girl (a situation they wanted to keep secret from Peter). After a battle with the Hobgoblin, May tells her godfather the truth, and after a conversation with Mary Jane, they allowed May to resume her Spider-Girl identity. After Mary Jane has an argument with May's real parents, she realizes that May will come to the truth about Peter someday but Peter planned it all along. Because of this action, she continues her fight to keep the city safe.

After an attempt at helping the S.H.I.E.L.D. government agency, a case filled with a piece of the Carnage symbiote was released. It attaches itself to May's friend Moose, who becomes the new Carnage. In exchange, Carnage will bond itself to Moose's terminally ill father, curing him in the process. Carnage causes a stir at May's school and kidnaps Peter and Baby Ben, forcing May to confront her friend. May tries to talk to Moose within the symbiote but fails, and it bonds with her cousin Ben. Peter escapes as May battles the two symbiotes and gathers sonic gear that may be able to defeat the symbiote. However, it is May who uses the weapons, thereby destroying the piece of the Carnage symbiote. Her success is not without a measure of collateral damage: not only is Moose furious at Spider-Girl for dooming his father, but the sonic weapon renders Ben deaf.

Ben's hearing is eventually restored thanks to the intervention of Normie Osborn. Normie later stumbles on one of Norman Osborn's former labs and discovers a fluid tank containing what appears to be a physical duplicate of May Parker. Notes left behind by his grandfather indicate that this Mayday is the original he kidnapped years ago, hinting that the Mayday raised by Peter and MJ is yet another clone.

Fury the Goblin Queen begins acting out the Green Goblin's final gambit against Peter Parker. While kidnapping the retired Spider-Man, Fury also activates a signal that awakens the unconscious girl within the Osborn labs' tank. The changeling escapes, confronting Mayday on the roof of her high school just as she is changing into Spider-Girl. The two briefly battle before being caught in an explosion. A critically injured May is rescued from the debris by Araña's forces. Araña is suddenly traumatized by her own ordeal, and, thinking that May might not survive her ordeal, offers to merge with her. However, she intervenes in a vision quest that Mayday is undergoing. By aiding her to overcome a force she was meant to overcome alone, she obstructs Spider-Girl from uncovering whether or not she is the true May; mainly because May is half Latina on her father's side and Araña is only going by the trauma she went through not thinking of what could happen to May and her school. Araña also has an ulterior motive: by assuming the body and power of Spider-Girl she hopes to take the Black Tarantula, an adversary and former lover, by surprise and defeat him. Araña successfully completes the merger and temporarily assumes control of May's body, leaving May and a third, blond woman who shares her name (later revealed to be the spirit of Aunt May) trapped within Araña's body.

Meanwhile, the changeling emerges from the blast relatively unharmed and attempts to resume May's life. However, her presence deeply disturbs Benjy. She later receives a call from Normie, telling her about the capture of Peter Parker, leading the changeling into taking on the role of Spider-Girl.

The two women are restored to their rightful bodies while in battle with others. May, in Araña's body, runs into the changeling just as Araña, in May's body, enters the lair of the Black Tarantula. The Black Tarantula is able to see through Araña's trick and nearly knocks her unconscious, just as May, in Araña's body, is knocked unconscious as well, leading the two of them to recover their original bodies.

Normie Osborne, along with Kaine, Phil Urich (in his Green Goblin costume), Darkdevil, and Raptor, tries to rescue Peter Parker from Fury's hands, unaware of the fact that Peter has absorbed the mind and memories of the original Norman Osborn. This leads to a fight between the assembled heroes and Peter, now possessed by the Green Goblin. May arrives just as Peter/Green Goblin reunites with the changeling, who is revealed to have been genetically spliced with the DNA of the Venom symbiote, giving her similar metamorphic powers displayed by Spidercide, but without the need for a host like normal symbiotes.

Bonding with his "daughter" (and, unintentionally, Spider-Girl), the possessed Peter declares himself as "The Goblin God" and begins to go on a rampage, while May finds herself trapped within her father's mental psyche. With the aid of the spiritual influence of her Great Aunt May Parker, as well as flashbacks to the day she healed Normie Osborn's psychological scars, Mayday and Peter are able to overcome Norman in a psychic duel and convince the Brand New May that May is a good person. Norman is seemingly defeated, but not before he denies Mayday the chance to discover whenever or not she is the true daughter of Peter and Mary Jane or the clone. Mary Jane is rescued from near-death by Benjy, who reveals he has developed organic webbing.

With the Brand New May uncertain of her place, May proposes she become a member of the Parker family; Mary Jane agrees, though Peter distrusts her and objects to the idea. May takes a walk, reflecting on how her parents, baby brother, and potential new twin sister have overcome so much and truly become "An Amazing Spider-Man Family".

The following story-line sees Mayday and her clone (now named April) begin to steadily grow as crime-fighting partners, with April proving at times to be unstable and far more intense and ruthless than her "cousin" Mayday. At one point, April murders Tombstone when she believes him to have murdered May.

In the meantime, whilst trying to control the rising gang warfare in New York City as well as keep her unruly cousin in line with both her temper and powers, Mayday's relationship with comic book artist and friend Wesley begins to blossom into a deeper bond, and Wes at times demonstrates hints that he knows May's identity. April briefly attempts to play mischievous match-maker with the pair by posing as May, but Wes sees through her deception. April eventually takes on the name "Mayhem" and embraces her symbiotic, intense, no-nonsense nature and cuts herself off from The Parker family to pursue a life as a vigilante who answers to no one.

The Spectacular Spider-Girl title concludes with May having a nightmare that she sacrificed herself to save April's life. However, in the far future, a future incarnation of April uses Doctor Doom's time machine to return to the present and convince her past self to act responsibly, she does and saves Mayday's life at the cost of her own and at the cost of the future that came to be. May is later united with Wes, who reveals that he does indeed know May's true identity and they kiss, beginning a relationship.

In the Spider-Verse storyline, Daemos, a member of the Inheritors and a relative of Morlun, attacked the Parker home and set it ablaze. Despite Wes' best efforts to help her, May is badly beaten. Peter, whose bionic leg is busted, frees May only to be caught in Daemos' grasp. Mary Jane hands baby Ben to May and tells her to run while she goes to help Peter. Daemos kills Peter and seemingly Mary Jane too. Two alternate universe Spider-Men consisting of Spider-UK and Last Stand Spider-Man appear in time to save May and Ben as Daemos emerges from the Parker home. May vows to avenge her family for what he has done.

May and the alternative Spiders later travel to Earth-616, where they recruit its version of Peter Parker alongside his most recent partner Silk and his clone Kaine. May reveals her identity to Peter, revealing that they have met before earlier in his timeline (when she travelled back in time to the events of The Amazing Spider-Man #25). The Spiders take the three to a safe zone where they eventually also come into contact with a team led by the "Superior Spider-Man" Otto Octavius. When Peter and Octavius clash and do battle with each other, Mayday requests that Captain Universe Spider-Man intervene and stop the fighting, as better time and energy could be spent tracking down the Inheritors, but the Cosmic Spider refuses. Peter eventually wins the fight. The safe zone is then compromised by the Inheritors, led by their father Solus, Cosmic Spider is killed, May is easily defeated, and can only look on helplessly as Benjy is captured, and it is revealed that he is "The Scion", a vital part of a prophecy that also involves "The Other" (Kaine) and "The Bride" (Silk). Despite her earlier vow to kill the Inheritors, after seeing Otto kill the Inheritors' 'Master Weaver' to stop their plans for good, May reconsiders her stance, avoiding destroying a crystal containing the life-essence of the Inheritors' 'father'. With the crisis concluded, Spider-Ham assures May that, if her father was anything like him, he would be proud of what she just did, May accepting the compliment despite Spider-Ham's comical appearance. Returning to her world with the Ben Parker of Earth-3145—a world where Ben became Spider-Man and his family were killed, resulting in Earth being decimated by a nuclear apocalypse—May learns that her mother and Wes survived the Inheritors' attack, although her father gave his life to save them. With Ben deciding to remain on this world to be the grandfather no other Ben Parker had the chance to become, May, on her mother's encouragement, decides to don her father's costume to become Spider-Woman.

Following the events of Secret Wars, the MC2 universe, along with most of the multiverse, is destroyed and is merged with several other alternate realities by God Emperor Doom into the patchwork planet called Battleworld. Mayday continues to protect the innocent as Spider-Woman, but still struggles to come to terms with her father's death. Many citizens still refer to her as Spider-Girl. However, after a battle against the Revengers, she donned a new costume and gained renewed hope for the future.

=== Warriors of the Great Web ===
Sometime within the eight months following the Incursions, in Web Warriors, Mayday joined Spider-Gwen, Spider-Man Noir, Spider-UK, Spider-Man India, Spider-Ham and Anya Corazon in protecting Earths without Spider-Men. After a romp on Earth-3015, Mayday confided to Gwen that she was still too concerned in leaving behind her mom and brother and told them to call her if they needed her. However, when an army of Electros attacked a nearby building in an attempt to steal silver, the two Spider-Women jumped into action, only for Gwen to get captured when Mayday attempted to rally the other Spiders. She then returned to Loomworld and informed Spider-Man (Pavitr Prabhakar), Spider-Ham, and Karn of the situation regarding Gwen's kidnapping. She was later seen alongside the other members of the Warriors of the Great Web in order to investigate the scene of Gwen's kidnapping.

=== Spider-Geddon and Spider-Girls ===
In the 2018 comics event Spider-Geddon and the spin-off mini-series Spider-Girls, Mayday is once again recruited to help the Web Warriors combat The Inheritors, who had managed to escape their confinement and had set up residence on Earth 616. Mayday and Anya are sent to the world of The Amazing Spider-Man: Renew Your Vows to recruit Annie May Parker, the second child Peter and MJ conceived after their version of Mayday died at birth.

With Annie's parents assisting the war effort against The Inheritors on Earth 616, Mayday and Anya try to help Annie unlock the mysteries of the Spider-Scrolls and find a means of stopping their enemies. Annie learns that she is the pattern weaver, the fourth Spider involved in the prophecy alongside Mayday's brother Benjy (The Scion), Silk (The Bride), and The Other. After battling two of the Inheritors on Annie's world, Mayday, Anya and Annie retreat to Loomworld where they find the web of destiny has been sabotaged. They then use the scrolls to return to Earth 616 and use Annie's web-weaving powers to help the web warriors defeat the Inheritors and their leader Solos. Afterwards, it is revealed that The Other has resurrected Mayday's father back on her own world

=== End of the Spider-Verse and Return of Normalcy ===
In the End of the Spider-Verse event, Mayday at some unspecified point is attacked and infected by one of the many Spider-Wasps unleashed on the multiverse by the demonic Shathra, turning her against the other warriors of the web., her father is one of Shathra's prisoners, The Other having transformed him into a savage Spider-Beast. The Other, with the aid of Spinneret and other heroes, helps to free the Spiders from Shathra's control and he and Mayday are finally reunited. Ultimately, it is the 616 variant of Arana who helps restore Mayday's father to normal using her mystic totem powers.

Shortly after this ordeal, Mayday settles back into her regular life, allowing her hair to grow longer again and reverting back to her original Spider-Girl codename. No longer dating Wes, Mayday began to flirt with a new student called Jason, and aided both pairs of Lady Hawks thwart a nearby crime. With her parents reconnecting on date nights, Mayday would babysit her brother Benjy, now having grown into a tyke and able to speak.

Mayday and her family meet Bailey Briggs, a.k.a. Spider-Boy, when he arrives in their universe after becoming unstuck through time and space. Mayday's parents offer him breakfast, and it is revealed Peter has returned to active duty as Spider-Man, a fully healthy leg restored to his body, removing his long-standing handicap. Mayday offers Bailey the use of her old web warrior equipment to contact Anya but Bailey vanishes as he is again pulled through the multiverse.

== Powers and abilities ==
Mayday Parker inherited many of her abilities from her father, Peter Parker. Mayday possesses superhuman strength but has less than her father, can leap several stories high, and can cover the width of a city block. Spider-Girl's reflexes are also heightened to levels well beyond that of an ordinary human. She heals somewhat faster than a normal human, and is more agile than Spider-Man.

Spider-Girl can adhere to almost any surface through a bio-magnetic field her body generates, allowing her to scale the sides of a building, just like a spider. Wall-crawling doesn't come as naturally to Mayday as Peter; she has to concentrate to keep herself from slipping off surfaces. In addition to adhering to surfaces, Mayday can also repel herself like an opposing magnet, or she can repulse and adhere another object or person through a shared medium. For example, she can cause a person to stick to a wall they're touching just by touching that same wall and willing them to, or she can just as easily violently push them away.

Mayday Parker has inherited a "spider-sense", a clairvoyance that warns her of danger, that is somewhat more powerful and reliable than her father's. It tells her the direction a threat is coming from with a high level of accuracy. Through intensive training, she learned to fight blindfolded using only her spider-sense. She can use it to spot weaknesses in an opponent and use them to her advantage. She can also sense mundane threats or observations like her father, but unlike him, she can use it to sense deception. Her spider-sense is also capable of differentiating between various threats, allowing May to "recognize" a familiar danger. By touching her father's clone, Kaine, she experienced a shared precognitive vision, but she does not normally have that ability.

Mayday also has mechanical web-shooters which are based on Ben Reilly's web-shooter design, but longer and narrower. They can fire impact webbing and metal needles called "Stingers". Mayday rarely uses the stingers, thinking them to be "too brutal". Her mobile phone is modified to attach to one of her web-shooters, and looks like one of its cartridges. She occasionally uses spider-tracers, but as they are tuned to her father's spider-sense and not hers, she needs a receiver to detect them. She wears a skin tight spandex unitard which she was uncomfortable with at first because of its revealing characteristics but has grown accustomed to it and even enjoys wearing it as she has been quoted as saying "it feels like a second skin."

Spider-Girl once lost her powers due to an electric shock. However, she borrowed the Green Goblin equipment from Normie Osborn until she regained them.

Mayday has also received martial arts training from the Ladyhawks and Elektra Natchios, as well as being drilled in the use of her powers by her father.

== Cast ==
=== Main cast ===
- Peter Parker – Peter is May and Ben's father, who happens to be Spider-Man but has retired from superhero business. His last battle cost him one of his legs, and he is now working as a police scientist. He also despises May's former boyfriend Gene, because he is the son of his high school bully, Flash Thompson. He has returned to the role of Spider-Man on occasion, although his artificial leg limits his activities. During the Spider-Verse event he dies at the hand of Daemos while giving May and Ben a chance to escape. In the end of Spider-Geddon, The Other resurrects him. The resurrection gives Peter a new leg, removing his long-standing handicap and allowing him to become Spider-Man regularly once again
- Mary Jane Watson-Parker – Mary Jane Watson-Parker is May and Ben's mother. Sharp-witted and responsible, Mary Jane knows her superhero husband and daughter inside and out.
- Phil Urich – Phil is the former Green Goblin (the only hero to use that name in this universe) and a good friend of the Parker family. He has been a friend of the family for so long that May calls him "Uncle Phil." Phil works with Peter Parker at his job in the crime lab. Occasionally, he uses his Goblin powers to help May, at one point taking on the identity of the "Golden Goblin". Later, with the assistance of Norman Osborn, Phil was able to come out of retirement and take on the identity of the Green Goblin again.
- Benjamin Richard Parker – Benjamin is May's beloved little brother, who has shown signs of developing spider-powers despite his young age. Ben was exposed to the Carnage symbiote, which may have sparked the development of his abilities. Ben was briefly rendered deaf due to high-frequency sonics, but eventually recovered. He later gained full-blown spider powers: however, despite Peter's suspicions, no one saw him using his abilities. Ben is affectionately nicknamed "Benjy" by his sister and was named after Uncle Ben and his grandfather Richard Parker. In later stories, Benjy undergoes a growth spurt and he is now a young tyke who has learned to talk. He has developed a weariness of his father's wheatcake servings.
- April Parker – April is a clone of May Parker and a Symbiote hybrid, giving her both the powers of Spider-Girl and Venom. Taking the name "Mayhem", April became a vigilante, and was not above killing criminals; at one point, she tried to end a gang war by killing Black Tarantula, a friend of May's, and she later succeeded in ending the war by killing Hobgoblin. April died saving May from an exploding building, but Peter assures May that clones always come back, so she may have survived.

=== Supporting cast ===
- Darkdevil – Reilly Tyne is a mocking Puck-like superhero who constantly taunts Spider-Girl for her various weaknesses, but has also proven to be a valuable ally. Although May's cousin (although some could call him her genetic half-brother), people mistook him for the currently-deceased Daredevil.
- Gerry Drew – The son of Jessica Drew, the first Spider-Woman. He has spider-powers because of his mother and he has an illness because of her radiation exposure. He once impersonated Spider-Man, but later retires from this alter-ego.
- Courtney Duran – Courtney is May's friend in school. She is a level-headed and bespectacled "Miss Normal" who is in her Science Club, and volunteers in the community along with May.
- Ladyhawk (Rosetta Morgan and Regina Morgan) is the shared codename of skilled martial artist sisters who use bird-themed shuriken and other weapons.
- Heather Noble – Heather is one of May's schoolmates. At first, she acted mean and stuck up towards May, but has since become her friend. She has been dating Jimmy Yama. Heather is later kidnapped by the Hobgoblin but fortunately Spider-Girl rescues her.
- Simone Desantos – Introduced in The Amazing Spider-Girl series, Simone seems to have taken Heather's former position as the stuck-up "mean girl" of May's school. Her father Rene turns out to be the head of the Goblin Cult, and this once led to Fury kidnapping Simone.
- Felicity Hardy – Felicity is the daughter of Felicia Hardy and Flash Thompson as well as the younger sister of Gene Thompson. She knows that May is Spider-Girl and adopted the costume of Scarlet Spider when May took a break from superhero business. However, she abandoned it quickly and helps May in her civilian identity.
- Sara Hingle – Sara is a mutant with either telekinetic or atomic powers. She had trouble accepting her gifts until May and Mary Jane talked to her. After seeing May nimbly dodge one of her energy blasts, Sara believes that she is a mutant too. She was later attacked by the anti-mutant group Humanity First, only to be saved by a pair of anti-human mutants, Impact and Pirouette, who convince her to join their crusade. She later takes on the costumed identity of Nucleus, and battles Spider-Girl. When she discovers that Impact and Pirouette are led by Magneta, she flees the group in terror. Later, she attacks Humanity First's headquarters. Spider-Girl arrives, and manages to talk her down. Magneta then activates a device that sends Sarah's powers out of control, resulting in a huge explosion.
- Jack Jameson – Jack Jameson, also called "JJ", is the grandson of J. Jonah Jameson, and he is secretly the superhero called The Buzz.
- Kaine – Kaine is very protective of Spider-Girl (his niece, and ultimately the source of his redemption). He currently leads a government team of reformed supervillains.
- Davida Kirby – Davida is May's best friend in school and teammate on her basketball team.
- Nancy Lu – Nancy a schoolmate of May who is a mutant with telekinetic powers; she was outed by her classmates, and had to leave the high school. She is an X-Man in-training known as "Push".
- Maurice "Moose" Mansfield – Maurice is a burly footballer who constantly clashes with Jimmy Yama. On a field trip, he witnessed Spider-Girl running out of a toilet in which Courtney had been, and from then on, thought Courtney was Spider-Girl. He later moved away to live with his uncle while his father is in the hospital. When he was bonded with the Carnage symbiote, he attempted to use its power to cure his father's cancer. When Spider-Girl used Reverb's sonic weaponry to destroy the symbiote, Moose was enraged that his only chance to help his father was destroyed.
- Brad Miller – Brad is a good-looking, smart teenager and May's secret crush. She dropped him when she found out he had a hatred for mutants.
- Normie Osborn – Normie is the grandson of Norman Osborn and was this universe's Green Goblin until he ceded that role to Phil Urich. He is both a former enemy and former crush of May's. In later issues, he obtained the Venom-symbiote for his own use until it died in the final battle against Hobgoblin and the Scriers. After the final battle, he married Brenda Drago (Raptor). He still has feelings for May.
- Eugene "Flash" Thompson – Flash is the coach of the basketball team at May's school. He was once married to Felicia Hardy and had a daughter Felicity and a son Gene with her (see above and below), but is unaware that Felicity tried to be May's partner in the hero business. A noticeable difference between this Flash Thompson and his Earth-616 counterpart is that he never lost his legs, and as a result never became the host of the Venom symbiote.
- Eugene "Gene" Thompson – Gene is the son of Felicia Hardy and Flash Thompson, and the older brother of Felicity Hardy. He was dating May, but broke up with her in The Amazing Spider-Girl #13, citing her constant unreliability. Missing her almost immediately, Gene asked Mayday to return to him, with Mayday agreeing. However, his dominating personality and demands for full commitment have placed a strain on Mayday's personal and social life. After beating up Wes Westin, and revealing that he was the one tagging May's campaign posters, May breaks up with him.
- James "Jimmy" Yama – Jimmy is a nerdy Asian schoolmate of May who is in her Science Club. He has a crush on May, a fact that makes May—who likes Jimmy as a friend, but not more–embarrassed. He has since started dating Heather Noble. He has a cousin named Zane, who happens to be the superhero J2, the son of the Juggernaut.
- Wes Westin – Wes is a talented artist, who has collaborated with Jimmy Yama in producing a Spider-Girl comic. He began a short relationship with Davida Kirby, but Davida begins to suspect his true feelings are for Mayday and encourages him to tell her how he feels. He later found out Spider-Girl's true identity by noticing the same scented shampoo. In the finale, he reveals to May that he knows her secret and they begin a relationship. Despite being there for Mayday to help her grieve the death of her father, the two have since broken up and his whereabouts are presently unknown.
- Mad Dog Rassitano – Human bounty hunter who uses equipment taken from the super-powered villains he hunts. He has his own TV show.

=== Villains ===
- Black Tarantula – Fabian LaMuerto is the current Kingpin of Crime. An honorable villain, he is a recurring foe, occasional ally, and possible love-interest for May. In The Spectacular Spider-Girl #4, he decided to retire from crime and return to South America with Arana as his bride. He left his empire to Man Mountain Marko.
  - Chesbro – Chesbro is the assistant of the Black Tarantula. He comes to New York to represent his master. Chesbro originally served Fabian's father.
- Dragon King – Carlton T. Hackmutter is a janitor at Midtown High School who came across a Dragon Medallion that transformed him into the Dragon King.
- Hobgoblin – Roderick Kingsley, an old foe of Spider-Man's who now serves as May's archenemy. Fearing that Kingsley would prove too much for May, Peter risked his life and once again became Spider-Man despite his handicap to aid her against him. After losing, Kingsley then tried his hand at other crimes only leading to his death at the hands of Mayhem.
- Killerwatt – Originally a backstage hand during concerts, the man now known as Killerwatt, was often blamed by the performing band for malfunctioning electrical equipment, until he was electrocuted by a sound board. He gained electrical based powers and set out to become a costumed thief, defeating Spider-Girl during their first battle, only to be driven off by Darkdevil. Soon after, Spider-Girl was able to defeat him in later battles.
- Mr. Abnormal – The identity of Mr. Abnormal was unknown. When he had entered a toy company, a plastic vat exploded where he was exposed to its chemicals and ended up gaining elastic-based powers.
- Raptor – Brenda Drago is the daughter of the second Vulture. Spider-Girl later convinced her to give up crime. She is a member of Kaine's superteam of reformed supervillains and was later married to Normie Osborn.
- Sabreclaw – The son of Wolverine and the half-brother of Wild Thing. He has powers like his father and Sabretooth. He later joined the A-Next as a hero.
- Mister Nobody – The teleporting mob hitman wore a featureless black mask to hide his identity while acting as a personal bagman and assassin for the imprisoned Kingpin of Crime, Wilson Fisk. Mister Nobody was featured in Spider-Girl #1 and would frequently fight her throughout the first half of the series. Up until he was fired, before returning under suspicious circumstances to assassinate Wilson Fisk allowing for a new Kingpin.

== Other versions ==
=== Prime Earth (Earth-616) ===
May Parker also existed in the primary Earth-616 timeline in which most Marvel Comics are set.

Mary Jane became pregnant at the beginning of the Clone Saga. Impending fatherhood was one of the main reasons Peter retired as Spider-Man during that story-line, passing the mantle to Ben Reilly. However, at the end of the story, Mary Jane was poisoned by Alison Mongrain, an agent of the Green Goblin, and the baby was stillborn (or seemed to be, as Mongrain took the infant away with her). The stillbirth of his child, combined with the death of Ben Reilly at the hands of the Green Goblin that same night, prompts Peter to retake the Spider-Man identity.

There were hints during the "Identity Crisis" story-line, one of Tom DeFalco's last story-lines on the title, that Baby May would be returned. Instead, the subplot was dropped, and a few issues later DeFalco was replaced by Howard Mackie and John Byrne. Under that team, Aunt May was brought back instead. In a flashback in Spider-Girl #49, an alternative version of this story was presented, with the younger May returned instead of the elder.

However, baby May and her parents were never reunited in Marvel's main continuity. Editors repeatedly stated that the baby died, or at the very least would never be seen again; the child was considered a major factor in the aging of the characters. In Marvel Knights Spider-Man issue #9, Mac Gargan, while speaking of Norman Osborn, states "He kills your unborn child, you kill his son". To date, this is the most conclusive evidence of the infant's fate.

The action in The Amazing Spider-Man #439 (DeFalco's last on the title) takes place 1,000 years in the future. Two archaeologists stumble across relics belonging to Spider-Man (such as his web-shooters). They speculate on his career, and discuss other heroes who were inspired by him, Spider-Girl and Spider-Man 2099.

In several interviews at Comic Book Resources following the publication of "One More Day," Joe Quesada mentioned that the Spider-Girl title would be the ideal place for disgruntled readers to follow the development of an aged, married Peter and M.J. as they raise a family. Quesada's comments were followed by a feature article on Spider-Girl with an interview with Tom Defalco, who acknowledged that Quesada was a fan of the character and the title. Moreover, during the 'One More Day/Brand New Day' story arc, Peter and Mary Jane have visions of a very young girl with red hair, who, after the deal is made with Mephisto, is revealed to be the daughter they would never have now that the deal is done. Despite this, Quesada has stated that he feels the MC2 universe is the natural progression of the characters.

During the "Sinister War" arc, it is revealed that Mephisto erased the Parkers' marriage to ensure that their daughter would not exist, as she would one day end his eventual reign over the Earth.

=== Earth X ===
There are two variant and alternate universe versions of Spider-Girl. One was raised by a Ben Reilly who survived after her father died during her childhood, as seen What If? vol. 2 #86, and later revealed in the Paradise X: Heralds miniseries. Another version of Spider-Girl is actually Venom, who is seen in the Earth X miniseries and its two sequels, Universe X and Paradise X.

The Venom version of May Parker is later recruited by Kang the Conqueror as part of a scheme against the Apocalypse Twins and the Avengers Unity Squad.

The world of MC2 is designated as "Earth-982". The world where Spider-Girl was raised by Ben Reilly (as May Reilly) is known as "Earth-1122" and the world featuring Venom as Spider-Girl along with the other heroes of the Earth X saga is known as "Earth-9997".

=== Spider-Man: Clone Saga ===
In 2009, Marvel published a miniseries based on the original plans for the Clone Saga. As in the original Clone Saga, Allison Mongraine kidnaps the infant May after she is born. However, the circumstances are a bit different. Mary Jane and Peter actually get to hold May before she is stolen, and Mongraine later hands the baby over to Kaine (who is working for the Green Goblin in this continuity). Holding the baby in his arms makes Kaine begin to doubt the Goblin's plans. His shadowy boss (later revealed to be Harry Osborn) notes to Kaine "You'll have to kill her if things go wrong." At the end of the series, Kaine returns May to Peter and Mary Jane.

=== Spectacular Spider-Girl ===
In a time-travel arc taking place in the UK-based publication The Spectacular Spider-Man, aimed at a much younger audience, Peter meets a Spider-Girl whilst trailing the Sandman in the future. With the aid of Spider-Girl and H.E.R.B.I.E., Peter defeats the Sandman and returns to his own time with H.E.R.B.I.E. At the conclusion of the strip, Spider-Girl returns home to her parents, revealed as Peter and Mary Jane Parker, and unmasks to reveal the features of Mayday Parker. Mayday tells her parents of her experience with a "new Spider-Man", before Peter assures her that the individual she met was a past version of himself. Peter also reveals in the conversation that, like his MC2 counterpart, he was forced to abandon his career as Spider-Man due to a leg injury. This continuity is separate from both MC2 and 616, making this the second continuity to adapt the MC2 version of how Peter relinquished the Spider-Man identity.

Mayday would again cross paths with her father's past self when Lady Octopus travels back in time to assassinate him. Mayday teams with her father but does not reveal her identity to him, despite desperately wanting to, for fear it may damage the timeline. The two defeat Lady Octopus and Mayday returns to the future.

=== Swiney-Girl ===
Tom Defalco briefly returned to his other Marvel creation Spider-Ham, an alternate version of Spider-Man that is a pig, in 2009 and 2010. Within those stories he introduced an alternate version of Spider-Girl known as Swiney-Girl (May "Mayday" Porker), who has similar background history with Spider-Girl, with her being the daughter of Peter Porker and Mary Crane Watsow, her father losing his leg after the final battle between Norman Osbird/Green Gobbler, and saving her father as Swiney-Girl from the grandson of the Green Gobbler, Norman Osbird Jr.

=== The Amazing Spider-Man: Renew Your Vows ===
In this continuity, Peter and Mary Jane have a daughter named Annie May Parker, who eventually becomes the superhero Spiderling. While it was believed she was the world's version of Spider-Girl, it eventually was revealed that the Clone Saga from the 616 continuity still happened in this world, which makes Annie May's younger sister.

=== Spider-Man: Life Story ===
In this continuity, Peter and Mary Jane have twins named Benjy and Claire Parker. Despite having a different name, Claire bears a strong resemblance in both appearance and personality to Mayday. For the first ten years of their lives, the two were solely raised by Mary Jane in Portland, Oregon after she left Peter following a traumatic incident. In 1995, Peter lets Ben Reilly take over his life as Spider-Man and CEO of Parker Industries so he could return to his family. In the mid-2000s, Claire convinces Peter to return to New York and become Spider-Man once more shortly after Morlun kills Ben Reilly so he could stop Tony Stark from taking over Parker Industries and to lure Morlun away from his family. Despite his efforts, Morlun attacks the twins and Mary Jane in Oregon as Peter gets involved in the superhero Civil War. When Benjy discovers that Morlun is vulnerable when he is feeding off someone, he uses himself as bait to allow Claire the chance to impale him on a splintered log of wood. Benjy survives the assault, but is crippled for life. By 2019, Claire has become Spider-Woman (now wearing a costume similar to Ultimate Jessica Drew's), and is instructed by her father to stay behind to protect her brother and mother as he goes to space to end Doctor Doom's reign of terror on the planet with Miles Morales.

=== Ultimate Universe ===
On Earth-6160, the Maker changed the past so that Peter never got his powers as a teenager. In the present, he is happily married to Mary Jane and they have two kids, a teenage son named Richard and a younger daughter named May. After Peter receives the radioactive spider from Tony Stark to become Spider-Man, May becomes the first one to discover his secret after seeing him in their kitchen late at night. She promises to keep his secret from Mary Jane and Richard until the time is right and inspires him to change his black picotech suit into his familiar red and blue costume as the black suit frightened her.

== In other media ==
=== Television ===
A character inspired by Mayday Parker as Spider-Girl named Petra Parker appears in the Ultimate Spider-Man four-part episode "The Spider-Verse", voiced by Olivia Holt. She is a gender-swapped incarnation of Peter Parker / Spider-Man from an alternate universe.

=== Film ===
Two incarnations of Mayday Parker appear in Spider-Man: Across the Spider-Verse (2023), with one being the infant daughter of Peter B. Parker and his universe's Mary Jane Watson, voiced by Michelle Ruff, and the second being an adult with Heterochromia iridum operating as Spider-Girl and a member of Miguel O'Hara's Spider-Society.

=== Video games ===
- Mayday Parker's Spider-Girl suit appears as an alternate costume for Spider-Woman in Marvel Ultimate Alliance.
- Mayday Parker as Spider-Girl makes a cameo appearance in Spider-Man: Shattered Dimensions.
- Mayday Parker as Spider-Girl appears as an unlockable playable character in Marvel Super Hero Squad Online, voiced by Tara Strong.
- Mayday Parker as Spider-Girl appears as an unlockable playable character in Marvel Avengers Alliance.
- Mayday Parker as Spider-Girl appears as an Enhanced Costume for Spider-Man in Marvel Heroes, voiced by Mary Faber.
- Mayday Parker as Spider-Girl appears as an unlockable playable character in Spider-Man Unlimited, voiced by Laura Bailey.
- Mayday Parker as Spider-Girl appears as an unlockable playable character in Marvel Mighty Heroes.
- May Parker as the Amazing Spider-Woman appears as an unlockable playable character in Marvel Avengers Alliance.
- Mayday Parker as Spider-Girl appears as a playable character in Spider-Man & Friends: Secret Missions.

=== Miscellaneous ===
An older, more cynical incarnation of Mayday Parker / Spider-Girl appears in the Spider-Man / X-Men crossover novel Time's Arrow 3: The Future by Tom DeFalco and Rosemary Edghill. This version wears a costume based on that of Jessica Drew's, modified to resemble Spider-Man's, and has the ability to fire venom blasts like Miles Morales.

== Collected editions ==
=== Spider-Girl (1998–2006) ===
Title	Material collected	ISBN	Release date
Spider-Girl: A Fresh Start	Spider-Girl #1–2	978-0785107200	December 31, 1998
Spider-Girl	Spider-Girl #0–8	978-0785108153	November 5, 2001
Vol. 1: Legacy	Spider-Girl #0–5	978-0785114413	April 1, 2004
Vol. 2: Like Father, Like Daughter	Spider-Girl #6–11	978-0785116578	December 15, 2004
Vol. 3: Avenging Allies	Spider-Girl #12–16 and Spider-Girl Annual '99	978-0785116585	April 13, 2005
Vol. 4: Turning Point	Spider-Girl #17–21 and Spider-Girl #½	978-0785118718	September 21, 2005
Vol. 5: Endgame	Spider-Girl #22–27	978-0785120346	January 25, 2006
Vol. 6: Too Many Spiders!	Spider-Girl #28–33	978-0785121565	June 21, 2006
Vol. 7: Betrayed	Spider-Girl #34–38 and #51	978-0785121572	November 15, 2006
Vol. 8: Duty Calls	Spider-Girl #39–44	978-0785124955	April 18, 2007
Vol. 9: Secret Lives	Spider-Girl #45–50	978-0785126027	October 31, 2007
Vol. 10: Season of the Serpent	Spider-Girl #52–59	978-0785132134	February 11, 2009
Vol. 11: Marked for Death	Spider-Girl #60–66	978-0785137412	December 8, 2009
Vol. 12: The Games Villains Play	Spider-Girl #67–72	978-0785144823	March 24, 2010
Vol. 13: When Destiny Calls!	Spider-Girl #73–79	978-0785145110	September 15, 2010
Vol. 14: Inside the Beast	Spider-Girl #80–84	978-0785145776	December 1, 2010
Vol. 15: Family Business	Spider-Girl #85–88	978-0785149484	February 25, 2011
Vol. 16: Shadows from the Past!	Spider-Girl #89–96	978-0785192398	April 17, 2011
Vol. 18: If Death Be My Destiny!	Spider-Girl #97–100	978-0785194378	May 7, 2011
Spider-Girl: The Complete Collection Vol. 1: Legacy	What If? (1989) #105, Spider-Girl #1–15 and Spider-Girl #½, and Spider-Girl Annual '99	978-1302912482	August 7, 2018
Spider-Girl: The Complete Collection Vol. 2	Spider-Girl #16–32	978-1302918446	August 6, 2019
Spider-Girl: The Complete Collection Vol. 3	Spider-Girl #33–50	978-1302923716	March 30, 2021
Spider-Girl: The Complete Collection Vol. 4	Spider-Girl #51–67	978-1302934798	April 12, 2022
Spider-Girl: The Complete Collection Vol. 5: Keeping the Faith	Spider-Girl #68–84	978-1302959821	November 19, 2024
Spider-Girl: The Complete Collection Vol. 6: Family Ties	Spider-Girl #85–99 and material from #100 and Spider-Man Family #1	978-1302966089	November 18, 2025

=== The Amazing Spider-Girl (2006–2009) ===
Title	Material collected	ISBN	Release date
Vol. 1: Whatever Happened to the Daughter of Spider-Man?	The Amazing Spider-Girl #0–6	978-0785123415	May 30, 2007
Vol.2: Comes the Carnage!	The Amazing Spider-Girl #7–12	978-0785123422	November 28, 2007
Vol. 3: Mind Games	The Amazing Spider-Girl #13–18	978-0785125587	May 28, 2008
Vol. 4: Brand New May	The Amazing Spider-Girl #19–24	978-0785129745	December 24, 2008
Vol. 5: Maybreak	The Amazing Spider-Girl #25–30	978-0785131878	July 1, 2009

=== The Spectacular Spider-Girl (2009–2010) ===
Title	Material collected	ISBN	Release date
Spectacular Spider-Girl: Who Killed Gwen Reilly?	Spectacular Spider-Girl #1–7 (Spider-Man Family #1–8 and Web of Spider-Man #1–4)	978-0785143192	March 24, 2010
Spectacular Spider-Girl: The Last Stand	Spectacular Spider-Girl #8–11, Spider-Girl: The End, and material from Web of Spider-Man #5–7	978-0785148999	March 24, 2010

=== Spider-Island (2015) ===
Title	Material collected	ISBN	Release date
Spider-Island: Warzones!	Spider-Island #1–5	978-0785198857	November 26, 2015

=== Web Warriors (2015–2016) ===
Title	Material collected	ISBN	Release date
Web Warriors: Protectors of the Spider-Verse – Electroverse	Web Warriors #1–5 and material from The Amazing Spider-Man (2015) #1	978-1302486341	May 11, 2016
Web Warriors: Protectors of the Spider-Verse – Spiders vs.	Web Warriors #6–11	978-1302495121	December 27, 2016

=== Spider-Girls (2018–2019) ===
Title	Material collected	ISBN	Release date
Spider-Geddon: Covert Ops	Spider-Force #1–3 and Spider-Girls #1–3	978-1302914974	February 27, 2019
Spider-Verse/Spider-Geddon Omnibus	Edge of Spider-Verse #1–5; Spider-Verse (2014) #1–2; The Superior Spider-Man (2013) #32–33; The Amazing Spider-Man (2014) #7–15; Spider-Man 2099 (2014) #5–8; Scarlet Spiders #1–3; Spider-Woman (2014) #1–4; Spider-Verse Team-Up #1-3; Edge Of Spider-Geddon #1-4; Spider-Geddon #0–5; Superior Octopus #1; Spider-Force #1–3; Spider-Girls #1–3; Peter Parker, The Spectacular Spider-Man (2017) #311–313; Spider-Gwen: Ghost Spider #1–4; Vault Of Spiders #1–2; Spider-Geddon: Spider-Man Noir Video Comic; Spider-Geddon: Spider-Gwen – Ghost Spider Video Comic; Spider-Geddon: Spider-Man Video Comic; Spider-Geddon Handbook, and material from Free Comic Book Day 2014 (Guardians Of The Galaxy)	978-1302947422	September 14, 2022

=== Spider-Boy (2024) ===
Title	Material collected	ISBN	Release date
Spider-Boy: The Dragon's Challenge	Spider-Boy #8–12	978-1302960377	July 1, 2025
