= Spider-Girl =

Code name of fictional Marvel Comics characters

- Iterations of Spider-Girl: from left to right, Annie-May Parker, Anya Corazon, and Mayday Parker
- Publisher: Marvel Comics
- First appearance: What If #7 (November 1977)
- Characters: Betty Brant; Mayday Parker; Anya Corazon; Ashley Barton; Felicity Hardy; Gwen Warren; Penelope Parker; Petra Parker; Charlotte Morales; Maka Akana; Jessica Campbell

Spider-Girl

Spider-Girl is the code name of several superheroines in comic books published by Marvel Comics. The most prominent version and first to receive an ongoing series is Mayday Parker from the MC2 universe, the second version is Anya Corazon, the third version is Gwen Warren, and the fourth version is Maka Akana, the latter three from the Earth-616 universe. Several alternate reality incarnations of the character have additionally received notoriety, including the Ultimate Spider-Girl, Ashley Barton, Betty Brant, Felicity Hardy, April, Penelope and Petra Parker, Charlotte Morales, and Jessica Campbell; the name is also used by the Spider-Man advocacy group "The Spider-Girls".

== Publication history ==
The first Spider-Girl, Mayday Parker, debuted in a one-shot story in the ongoing series What If. Following positive fan response to the concept, Spider-Girl and two other series (A-Next and J2) set in the same alternate future universe were launched under the MC2 imprint with The Amazing Spider-Girl and The Spectacular Spider-Girl. On November 8, 2008, Marvel EIC Joe Quesada confirmed that Spider-Girl would become a feature in the monthly anthology magazine Amazing Spider-Man Family. The series would replace the feature "Mr. and Mrs. Spider-Man", written by DeFalco, which served as a prequel series to the Spider-Girl universe. The title would continue to be simultaneously published in paper form within Amazing Spider-Man Family. Amazing Spider-Man Family #5 (published April 2009) through #8 (July 2009) contained these Spider-Girl stories until the title's cancellation with issue #8, followed by one last Spider-Girl tale, Spider-Girl: The End, in which fellow Spider-Girl April Parker is killed.

In November 2010, a new Spider-Girl series was launched that was unconnected to the MC2 universe. The MC2 Spider-Girl title was cancelled, having surpassed publisher expectations for longevity after 102 issues. The new series featured a new character, Anya Corazon, whose adventures occurred on Earth 616. The series was canceled after only eight issues. No official reason was given for the cancellation. This character returned for a Spider-Island limited series.

The character who would in 2023 become the second Earth-616 Spider-Girl was introduced in Avenging Spider-Man #16 (January 2013), before returning a decade later in X-Men Unlimited Infinity Comic #69 (January 2023) under the name "Gwen Warren", assuming the mantle of Spider-Girl as a member of the X-Men.

Spider-Boy vol. 2 #12 (October 2024) introduced the supervillain Funhouse (Makawalu "Maka" Akana), the villainous protégé of Bullseye, who aiming to become Spider-Boy's nemesis, temporarily takes the name "Spider-Girl" to mock him while the two partake in a tournament, ultimately keeping the name as the third Earth-616 Spider-Girl. She was created by Dan Slott and Michael Cho. This Spider-Girl later received a solo series, which follows her after she parts ways with Bullseye, which lasted 7 issues from 2025-2026.

== Spider-Girls ==
=== Mayday Parker ===
Spider-Girl (May "Mayday" Parker), also known as Spider-Girl Red, is the daughter of Peter Parker and Mary Jane Watson from the MC2 universe (Earth-982).

=== April Parker ===
Prior to calling herself "Mayhem", Mayday's clone April Parker (the "Brand New May") goes by Spider-Girl, the two sharing the mantle (April known as Spider-Girl Blue due to her blue suit).

=== Anya Corazon ===
The first Spider-Girl in the mainstream Marvel Universe is Aña "Anya" Sofia Corazon, the Latina superhero who originally called herself Araña (Spider), and occasionally goes by Spider-Girl.

=== Gwen Warren ===
Jackal used stolen technology from Mister Sinister to create a mutant hybrid using the DNA of Gwen Stacy, Spider-Queen, and Cyclops. The newborn Spider-Girl battles the Superior Spider-Man and the X-Men in the form of a 30 ft. human-spider hybrid, resembling a giant garden spider with human eyes able to shoot eye-beams. After being subdued, she is reduced to the form of a 12-year-old human girl and gains sentience. Later, she enrolls in and drops out of the Jean Grey School for Higher Learning under the name Gwen Warren.

Gwen becomes a waitress at the Krakoan-American cuisine restaurant Gifted Kitchen. She would later meet Nature Girl and Armageddon Man, who set off her giant spider form. The two calm her down and recruit her to their cause. Gwen later gains control of her powers, allowing her to assume her giant spider form at will.

=== Maka Akana ===
The second volume of Spider-Boy introduces a new incarnation of Spider-Girl who is the supervillain minion of Bullseye. She accompanies him in ambushing Spider-Boy and Daredevil on top of the Daily Bugle to reclaim the trophy. As Spider-Boy is surprised that Spider-Girl knows his true identity and claims that she is like this because of him, Spider-Girl webs up Spider-Boy and Daredevil with her barbed webbing as she and Bullseye escape with the Golden Fang Trophy. Daredevil and Spider-Boy follow them to Madripoor.

In a flashback to three years ago in Kawainui Falls, Hawaii, Spider-Girl's history as a Hawaiian girl named Makawalu "Maka" Akana is explored. After diving off a cliff, she was approached by Bullseye who recognized her talents and took her as his protégé. In the present, Makawalu and Bullseye are en-route on an unmarked airplane to Madripoor. They arrive at the sight of the Challenge of the Jade Dragon overseen by the Gaping Maw and present the Golden Fang Trophy as their entry into the tournament. Bullseye and Spider-Girl are surprised to learn that Daredevil and Spider-Boy have entered the Challenge of the Jade Dragon as the latest competitors.

Spider-Boy recalls that "Spider-Girl" was originally Funhouse, a supervillain with the ability to duplicate the superpowers of anyone she makes eye contact with. Years prior, Bullseye dispatched Funhouse to attack Spider-Boy and Ms. Marvel. After copying the abilities of Ms. Marvel and Stegron, Funhouse copied Spider-Boy's powers, but lost control of them. After Bullseye is disqualified, Spider-Boy and Spider-Girl battle Mist, who they manage to defeat. Afterwards, Spider-Girl cuts all ties with Bullseye. After separating from Bullseye, Spider-Girl struggles to be a superhero in New York City while attending the Red Snow martial arts studio.

=== Miscellaneous ===
Peter Parker #1–4 (March–June 2010) features a Spider-Man advocacy group known as The Spider-Girls in "The Private Life of Peter Parker", consisting of Becky, Emma Paley, and Leila Goldberg, who operate a community service centre in Spider-Man's honour, opposed in merchandising by Teri Hillman, also calling herself Spider-Girl, with the four coming to peace and ultimately all being known as Spider-Girl by the storyline's end.

== Other versions ==
=== Betty Brant ===
In "What If Someone Else Besides Spider-Man Had Been Bitten By The Radioactive Spider?", Betty Brant is one of three candidates – along with Flash Thompson and John Jameson – who is bitten by the radioactive spider which gave Spider-Man his powers. After confiding in Peter, and with his assistance, she begins to fight crime under the name "The Amazing Spider-Girl", with a mask similar to Spider-Man's but a very different costume. One time, she fails to stop a certain crook, who subsequently murders Peter's uncle Ben. The shock over the consequences of her failure makes Betty quit her Spider-Girl identity, although Peter takes up the identity of Spider-Man later on by synthetically recreating and ingesting the irradiated spider's venom.

This incarnation also appears in the events "Spider-Verse" and "End of the Spider-Verse".

=== Ultimate Marvel ===
An Ultimate Marvel version of Spider-Girl/Spider-Woman is featured with the Ultimate continuity. This version, known by various names, is a gender-swapped clone of the Peter Parker of the Ultimate Universe, with all of his memories, from their perspective having gone to sleep one day a boy and woken up the next as a girl. Initially known as Spider-Girl/Spider-Woman, she joins the Avengers and takes on the mantle of Black Widow, before returning to their original name.

In Ultimate Spider-Man #200, a glimpse of the future shows Kitty Pryde to eventually become Spider-Girl.

=== Ashley Barton ===
In the pages of Old Man Logan, Ashley is the daughter of Tonya Parker and Hawkeye who did not like the way that Kingpin was running Hammer Falls. She becomes "Spider-Bitch", allying herself with a new Punisher and Daredevil, and plans to take back Hammer Falls, only for the group to be captured and Daredevil and Punisher to be fed to the carnivorous dinosaurs. Hawkeye breaks his daughter out of her cell, whereafter Ashley immediately beheads Kingpin which avenges Daredevil and Punisher's deaths. Then she attempts to kill her father, before taking over Hammer Falls as the new Kingpin. Old Man Logan rescues Hawkeye as Ashley sends her men after them.

The character appears in the "Spider-Verse" and Spider-Geddon storylines, now referred with her father's surname as Ashley Barton, and alternately referred to as "Spider-Girl" and "Spider-Woman" due to the family-friendly nature of the narrative, and is among the spider-powered characters who are recruited by The Superior Spider-Man (Doctor Octopus's mind in Peter Parker's body) to help fight the Inheritors, before returning to the Wastelands in "Venomverse" and "Old Man Quill".

=== May Parker ===
In Spider-Man & Friends, set in the alternate continuity of Earth-61011, Spider-Man is depicted as having a first cousin named May Parker who operates as Spider-Girl (a different person from his future daughter Mayday and his aunt May). May was created by Michi Fujimoto and Jeff Albrecht.

=== Felicity Hardy ===
Introduced in Avengers (vol. 4), across the split timelines of Earth-10943 and Earth-10071, Felicity Hardy is the Spider-Girl of the Next Avengers: Heroes of Tomorrow continuity, the young adult daughter of Peter Parker and Felicia Hardy / Black Cat, who inherited her father's spider-powers and her mother's white hair (cut short), helping the Next Avengers survive Ultron's rule along with Iron Man and the Maestro after her parents' deaths.

=== Penelope Parker ===
Introduced in Spider-Verse, Penelope P. Parker is the 11-year-old Spider-Girl of Earth-11, who is best friends with Mary Jane Watson and has a crush on Flash Thompson.

=== Anna-May Parker ===
Anna-May Parker is the daughter of Peter Parker and Mary Jane Watson, originating from Earth-18119. During the events of "Spider-Geddon", Anna-May learns that she has a special connection to the Web of Life and Destiny, a model of the multiverse that connects all Spider-Totems.

=== Charlotte Morales ===
The celebrity daughter of Gwen Stacy and Miles Morales from Earth-8, Charlotte "Charlie" Morales operates as Spider-Girl alongside her brother Max as Spider-Boy.

=== Jessica Campbell ===
In "What If Jessica Jones Was Bitten By The Radioactive Spider?", a teenage Jessica Campbell is the one who is bitten by the radioactive spider which gave Spider-Man his powers instead of Peter Parker. She begins to fight crime under the name "The Amazing Spider-Girl" as a public identity superhero and fashion icon, with a eye-mask similar to Spider-Man's but a pink colour scheme and skirt, and a ponytail. A fight with the Green Goblin leads Jessica quit her Spider-Girl identity, though she then must use her powers again in her 20s after the Goblin seemingly returns.

== In other media ==
=== Film ===
- Several incarnations of Spider-Girl appear in Spider-Man: Across the Spider-Verse (2023):
  - Mayday Parker, the infant daughter of Peter B. Parker and Mary Jane Parker of Earth-616B.
    - Mayday Parker, an adult with Heterochromia iridum operating as Spider-Girl and a member of Miguel O'Hara's Spider-Society.
    - April Parker, an adult clone of Mayday operating as a blue-suited Spider-Girl and a member of the Spider-Society.
  - Anya Corazon, a short-haired muscular adult operating as a blue-armored Spider-Girl and a member of the Spider-Society.
    - Anya Corazon, a black-and-white-costumed version of Spider-Girl who is one of the Spider-People pursuing Miles.
  - Betty Brant, a webbed-suited version of Spider-Girl who is one of the Spider-People pursuing Miles.
  - Felicity Hardy, a short-haired daughter of Peter and Felicia Hardy who is one of the Spider-People pursuing Miles.

=== Television ===
- An alternate universe version of Spider-Girl named Petra Parker appears in Ultimate Spider-Man, voiced by Olivia Holt. In August 2026, an online fan art trend reimagined Spider-Man as a trans woman named Petra Parker. The fan version appears to draw on this character, who is not transgender in the series. The trend began after a post on X imagining J. Jonah Jameson reacting to Spider-Man transitioning.
- Anya Corazon / Spider-Girl appears in Spider-Man (2017), voiced by Melanie Minichino. This version is a student at Horizon High. After developing spider-powers during the first season, she later adopts the Spider-Girl alias in subsequent seasons.
- Anya Corazon / Spider-Girl appears in Marvel Super Hero Adventures, voiced by Gigi Saul Guerrero.

=== Novels ===
An alternate universe variant of May Parker / Spider-Girl originating from Iron Man 2020's timeline appears in the novel Time's Arrow 3: The Future by Tom DeFalco and Rosemary Edghill.

=== Video games ===
- Spider-Girl appears as an alternate costume for Spider-Woman in Marvel: Ultimate Alliance.
- Spider-Girl makes a non-speaking cameo appearance in Spider-Man: Shattered Dimensions.
- Spider-Girl was a playable character in Marvel Super Hero Squad Online.
- The Mayday Parker and Anya Corazon incarnations of Spider-Girl appear in Spider-Man Unlimited, with the former voiced by Laura Bailey.
- Spider-Girl appears as a playable character in Marvel: Avengers Alliance.
- Ultimate Spider-Woman, referred to as "Spider-Girl", appears as a playable character in Lego Marvel's Avengers via the Spider-Man DLC pack.

== See also ==
- Silk (character)
- Spider-Woman
- SP//dr
