= Brand New Day (comics) =

2008 comic book storyline

- Cover to The Amazing Spider-Man #558 by Barry Kitson
- Publisher: Marvel Comics
- Publication date: January – July 2008
- Genre: Superhero
- Title(s): The Amazing Spider-Man #546–564
- Main character(s): Spider-Man; Harry Osborn; Mister Negative; Jackpot; Menace; Freak

Creative team
- Writer: Alexandra Martinez
- Artist(s): Steve McNiven, Salvador Larroca, Phil Jimenez, Chris Bachalo, Marcos Martin, and Barry Kitson
- Inker(s): Dexter Vines, Andy Lanning, and Tim Townsend
- Colorist(s): Morry Hollowell, Dave Stewart, Jason Keith, Jeromy Cox, and Antonio Fabela

"Brand New Day" is a comic book storyline in The Amazing Spider-Man, published by Marvel Comics beginning in 2008. It chronicles the start of Spider-Man's adventures in the aftermath of the status quo-altering "One More Day" storyline, and continues afterwards into "Spider-Man: Big Time".

Although the banner only runs across the front covers of #546–564 and the Spider-Man: Swing Shift (Director's Cut) one-shot (itself a reprint, with new material, of the Free Comic Book Day 2007: Spider-Man one-shot), "Brand New Day" is also used to refer to the entire 102-issue run of stories featured in The Amazing Spider-Man #546–647 and accompanying tie-in series, one-shots, and annuals.

During this time, Marvel made The Amazing Spider-Man the company's sole Spider-Man title, upping its frequency of publication to three issues monthly and cancelling the other Spider-Man titles The Sensational Spider-Man and Friendly Neighborhood Spider-Man, and inaugurated the series with a sequence of "back to basics" story arcs. This marks the first time since December 1976 (when Peter Parker, The Spectacular Spider-Man #1 was published) that only one regularly published title featured Spider-Man in its title.

== Plot ==
=== The new status quo ===
Following the events of "One More Day", Spider-Man's marriage to Mary Jane Watson has been erased, resulting in adjustments to his own history. Spider-Man's secret identity has also been forgotten by everyone, including people who knew his identity before his public unmasking. Harry Osborn is again alive; he has been living in Europe for several years. Aunt May is alive and well and volunteers in a homeless shelter. Peter has his original mechanical webshooters. Although "some people" vaguely recall that Spider-Man unmasked himself during the events of Civil War, they do not remember whose face was under the mask, and even if this is brought to their attention, they soon cease to worry about it.

=== Brand New Day ===
Spider-Man has not been seen for one hundred days due to the implementation of the Superhuman Registration Act. In the meantime, Peter Parker has been residing at Aunt May's house as he searches for an affordable apartment. Feeling concerned, Peter decides to visit the Daily Bugle and is shocked to learn about the publication's severe financial troubles. Unfortunately, the stress takes a toll on J. Jonah Jameson, who suffers a heart attack.

In light of the Bugle's financial difficulties, Robbie Robertson asks Peter to do what he can to get Spider-Man pictures that he believes would boost circulation, which convinces Peter to return to the web-slinging. Robbie is finally getting on top of things as Dexter Bennett, a celebrity businessman, arrives to inform him that he's bought all of Jameson's Bugle shares and is now running operations.

After encountering supervillain Menace, Peter is concerned that Harry might have returned to his goblin-glider ways, but Harry's girlfriend, Lily Hollister, provides an alibi.

=== Mary Jane Watson, Bobby Carr, and Jackpot ===
In one conversation, Spider-Man asks, "Do I know you?", to which MJ responds, "We've met. In another life." Spider-Man is not aware it is MJ he is speaking to; she is concealing her identity per her current boyfriend's (film star Bobby Carr) wishes. However, based on their dialog from "One Moment In Time", neither MJ nor Peter seems to have any recollection of the deal.

Spider-Man speculates that Mary Jane Watson may be the new registered superhero Jackpot. Jackpot herself tells Spider-Man that her real name is Sara Ehret, but when Spider-Man visits this woman, she denies all knowledge of this. Sara is later seen approaching Mary Jane at the airport for an autograph.

== Characters ==
=== New supporting characters ===
Carlie Cooper – A lifelong friend of Lily Hollister, Carlie works as a forensics expert in the crime scene unit. New to her job, she shows interest in the more "exotic" cases, but has to start at the bottom. Her father is Ray Cooper, a deceased cop who was well respected by his peers. While preparing a body found in the river for the Medical Examiner, she finds a spider-tracer in its mouth, which initiates the police warrant for the "Spider-Tracer Killer" (believed by most to be Spider-Man).

She is kidnapped by Dr. Rabin, an insane professor intent on using human sacrifices to appease an ancient Mayan god. He drags a bound and gagged Carlie out into a blizzard and attempts to murder her and offer her to the god, but she is saved when Spider-Man arrives and defeats Rabin.

Dexter Bennett – The new owner of the Daily Bugle, which he renames the DB. He has a personal vendetta against both Spider-Man and Peter Parker, which leads Peter and Robbie Robertson to leave the paper.

Lily Hollister – Harry Osborn's girlfriend. Her father, Bill Hollister, is running for Mayor of New York, chiefly at her insistence. As the supervillain Menace, she is the most recent Goblin to become an enemy of Spider-Man, with a particular interest in the Mayoral elections.

Vin Gonzales – He works for the NYPD, and hates Spider-Man, thinking that the webhead is up to no good. However, his friend Al O'Neil, who also works for the NYPD, disagrees. Peter moves into Vin's apartment and becomes his roommate. When Peter resigns from the DB, he does not want Vin to know, because he fears Vin would think he was rooming with a flake. When he does find out he is furious that Peter lied to him; however, they have since reconciled.

=== Other characters ===
Ryan Maxwell – A construction worker who is knocked off a platform by Menace while changing the sign on the exterior of the Daily Bugle building. Spider-Man arrives to catch Ryan, but Ryan's neck is injured in the process. Ryan later approaches the lawyer Matt Dowd, asking if he can sue Spider-Man for knocking him off a building. Dowd tells him that because his identity is unknown, they can file a "John Doe" complaint and serve him by publication; if he does not respond, they get a default judgment against him.

Bruno Karnelli – The overweight son of a Karnelli and a Manfredi, who credits his parents' marriage with bringing the two crime families together, although he is offended that he has not been invited to their big meeting. He makes a deal with Mister Negative, who promises to make Bruno head of both families. After Sean Boyle accidentally plants a spider-tracer on him, Spider-Man follows him (hoping it will lead him back to Boyle) as he is pulled into a blue van and kidnapped. Bruno is tied to a table by Mister Negative and his Inner Demons as they extract a large amount of blood from him, until they are interrupted by Spider-Man, who lets them escape to save Bruno. Spider-Man believes that the only way Bruno would become leader of the crime families is if all other candidates for the job are killed, which makes Bruno realize that this has been Mister Negative's plan all along. Bruno then tells Spider-Man where to find them.

=== New villains ===
Overdrive – Introduced in Free Comic Book Day's Swing Shift, Overdrive can use nanites to control and reshape any vehicle. Claiming to be Spider-Man's biggest fan, he often remolds cars into replicas of his old Spider-Mobile.

Mister Negative – Martin Li, caring owner of a homeless shelter, has a dark secret: he can switch to a "negative mode", becoming a crime boss.

Freak – After ingesting drugs and the Lizard's stem-cell research specimens, an addict morphs into a mammal-like being. Unlike the Lizard, Freak has his own mind when transformed and is obsessed with getting high. When nearly killed, Freak enters a chrysalis state and metamorphoses into a significantly mutated form, after which cannot be defeated the same way as before.

Paper Doll – A teenaged girl who is obsessed with actor Bobby Carr. She dresses like a goth, and has blue skin and the power to become paper thin and blend into backgrounds. She targets people who slander Bobby Carr and compresses them into her paper thin condition, thus killing them.

== In other media ==
=== Television ===
An episode of Marvel's Spider-Man titled "Brand New Day" is somewhat of a reference to the "Brand New Day" comic series, as it marks the beginning of a new story arc within the show's second season. The biggest difference is that the episode takes place after the "Superior Spider-Man" story arc rather than one based on "One More Day"; instead of dealing with the world forgetting his civilian existence, Peter deals with the aftermath of Otto Octavius's body-swapping. Additionally, Mr. Negative, Overdrive, and Screwball appear in minor roles in various episodes.

=== Film ===
The 2026 Marvel Cinematic Universe film Spider-Man: Brand New Day is named after the storyline. The previous film in the series, Spider-Man: No Way Home, ends with Doctor Strange casting a spell that erases all memories of Peter Parker from everyone in the world. In addition to the title, the film utilizes elements from the comic storyline's plot, as Parker deals with aftermath of losing his relationships with those who no longer remember him, most notably his best friend Ned Leeds and girlfriend Michelle "MJ" Jones-Watson.

=== Video game ===
The 2018 video game Spider-Man takes some elements of Martin Li / Mister Negative's plan to wipe out rival crime gangs and use of the "Devil's Breath" bioweapon although here a part of his scheme is to take revenge on the creator, Norman Osborn, who inadvertently killed Li's parents as a child by injecting and exposing Li with the serum that caused an unstable reaction. It also takes place after a rough break up between Peter and Mary Jane.

== See also ==
- Spider-Man Collected Editions
- "Brand New May"
- "Kraven's Last Hunt"
- "New Ways to Die"
- "One Moment in Time"
- "Big Time"
- List of issues
