= Anya Corazon =

Marvel Comics superheroine

Anya Corazon Araña
- Anya Corazon as seen on the textless cover of Spider-Girl #1 (January 2011). Art by Barry Kitson and Chris Sotomayor.

Publication information
- Publisher: Marvel Comics
- First appearance: As Anya Corazon: Amazing Fantasy #1 (August 2004); As Araña: Amazing Fantasy #2 (September 2004); As Spider-Girl: Young Allies #5 (October 2010)
- Created by: Joe Quesada; Fiona Avery; Mark Brooks

In-story information
- Species: Human mutate
- Place of origin: Brooklyn, New York City
- Team affiliations: Young Allies (Heroic Age); SHRA Training Program; WebCorps; Spider Society; Avengers Academy; Web Warriors
- Partnerships: Ms. Marvel; Spider-Man; Spider-Woman
- Notable aliases: Spider-Girl, Araña, Arañita, the Hunter
- Abilities: Superhuman strength, speed, agility, stamina, reflexes/reactions, coordination, balance and endurance; Spider physiology: ability to stick to solid surfaces and webbing ability; Use of spider-like grappling hooks; Formerly could create a blue carapace-like protective exoskeleton

Aña "Anya" Sofia Corazón (surname alternatively shown without diacritic, Corazon, over the years) is a superhero appearing in American comic books published by Marvel Comics. Created by Marvel editor-in-chief Joe Quesada, writer Fiona Avery, and artist Mark Brooks, the character made her first appearance in Amazing Fantasy #1 (August 2004). She is the Latina daughter of a Puerto Rican father and a Mexican mother. Corazón was the first Marvel character to adopt the identity Araña (Spider), before becoming Spider-Girl (Young Allies #5, October 2010). She is the third Spider-Girl published by Marvel, and the first to appear in the mainstream Marvel universe.

Anya Corazón / Spider-Girl made her cinematic debut in the animated Spider-Man: Across the Spider-Verse (2023), and is played by Isabela Merced in Sony's Spider-Man Universe (SSU) film Madame Web (2024).

== Publication history ==
Anya Corazon was created by Marvel Comics editor-in-chief Joe Quesada, writer Fiona Avery, and artist Mark Brooks, and is based on ideas J. Michael Straczynski used in his run on The Amazing Spider-Man. Araña was the star of the resurrected comic book series Amazing Fantasy, launched in 2004. After her storyline ended in Amazing Fantasy #6, she appeared in her own twelve issue series Araña: The Heart of the Spider, starting in March 2005 as part of Marvel Next. The character next appeared in the Ms. Marvel title as a recruit for service as a licensed superhero under the Superhuman Registration Act.

She next appears teaming up with Nomad to fight the secret empire in a backup story in Captain America #602-605. Chronologically, her next appearance was during the "Grim Hunt" storyline in The Amazing Spider-Man; however, her appearance in the new Young Allies series was published first.

As the new Spider-Girl, she starred in a monthly Spider-Girl comic that debuted on November 17, 2010 as a tie-in to the "Big Time" storyline in The Amazing Spider-Man. With the change of moniker to Spider-Girl, she's the second published character to adopt the "Spider-Girl" alter-ego, but she actually comes prior to the first character in the chronology of the Marvel Universe. It was announced concurrently with the announcement of the series' cancellation that Anya would be receiving a new mini-series as part of the Spider-Island crossover. The first issue of the mini-series was released one month after the final issue of the cancelled series, and one month after the mini-series ended Anya appeared in one issue of Avengers Academy.

Anya was one of the main characters in Marvel's Spider-Verse event, which led to a spinoff miniseries in Secret Wars, which she was also included in. She was one of the stars in the team comic Web Warriors as a part of All-New, All-Different Marvel.

== Fictional character biography ==
=== Origin ===
Anya Corazon as Araña from Araña: The Heart of the Spider #1. Art by Mark Brooks.

On her first day at Milton Summers High School in Fort Greene, Brooklyn, Anya is friends with classmate Lynn Sakura. She is later caught in a skirmish between two mystical clans, the Spider Society and the Sisterhood of the Wasp, and is mortally wounded. To save her life, the mage Miguel Legar from the Spider Society performs a ritual on her by giving her a spider-shaped tattoo that endows her with spider-like powers, and recruits her to be a Hunter for the Spider Society. WebCorps operatives Nina Smith and Ted Mankowski offer her various costumes, but she decides to make her own costume. She designs a costume as "Araña" with red and blue sneakers, blue track pants, red backpack, red gloves with many pockets, and large yellow-lensed goggles. As part of her powers, an insectoid exoskeleton covers most of her body. In place of equipment like web-shooters or spider tracers, Anya created her own modified bolas out of discs that are about the size of her palm and have eight red legs able to grip objects. Anya fights a Hunter from the Sisterhood of the Wasp, adversaries of the Spider Society.

=== Heart of the Spider ===
While interrogating a spy for the Sisterhood of the Wasp, Anya and Miguel discover that the Sisterhood of the Wasp has recruited a fifteen-year-old boy codenamed Amun, a descendant of Egyptian assassins who believes the boy is skilled enough to not need to conceal his own identity. Anya soon meets Amun who has enrolled at her school under the name Jon Kasiya. The two soon deduce each other's dual identities. Later, during a fight with Anya, Miguel, and the Sisterhood of the Wasp, Amun tells her that Amun will attack her loved ones if she opposes. Noting her father Gil Corazon is filming the fight, Anya takes Gil to safety. In her absence, Amun seriously wounds Miguel. The encounter leaves Anya doubting her duty due to the danger it poses to her loved ones. However, in a chance encounter, Spider-Man arrives and, after discussing her origins and adventures, tells her, "With great power comes great responsibility" and that in every age, people are called to be heroes. Soon afterward, Anya fights Amun and, in anger, nearly strangles Amun to death. She is stopped and Amun runs. She learns she had released "the Spirit of the Hunter" and warned not to do it again without Miguel with her. Back at WebCorps, Miguel is revived upon being reunited with Anya, and Miguel tells her the organization's history that would eventually split into Wasps and Spiders. After an encounter with a gunman in a coffee shop, in which Anya saves Lynn and Amun without revealing her secret identity, Amun promises to respect her double life and to stop targeting her friends and family.

=== Night of the Hunter ===
The Sisterhood of the Wasp recruits Jaime Jade, a Mexican crime lord who has mental abilities that allows to hypnotize other people and was involved in the death of Anya's mother Sofia Corazon. Miguel stops Anya from going after Jade alone with the promise that Anya can punish Jade afterwards. Anya and Amun develop a loose truce because Amun has lost his father as well, so he checks into Jade's possible involvement in Sofia's death. Jade hypnotizes Anya into fighting Miguel, but she eventually breaks free of the control and knocks Jade out. When Jade wakes up, the car Jade is in is suspended by a rope over the river. Jade thinks she's bluffing, saying "Little miss super hero won't want my death on her conscience." to which she replies "No, my conscience feels fine," and lets go of the rope. Anya reluctantly dives into the water to save Jade, but the crime lord has already escaped.

=== Spider-Man/Araña: The Hunter Revealed ===
In the one-shot Spider-Man/Araña: the Hunter Revealed, she discovers that her exoskeleton is not an ability from being a Hunter, and she has in fact never been a true Hunter. While facing a gigantic monster summoned by the Wasps, she grants her Hunter abilities to Nina and renounces Webcorps. After Miguel is killed saving Nina from the Wasps' hunter, Nina is Webcorps' chosen champion, and Anya is free to pursue a new fate.

=== Civil War ===
The pro-registration heroes have tasked Carol Danvers and Wonder Man to find Anya, convince her to register, and train her. After foiling an attempted robbery, Anya and her father are taken into custody where Gil learns of Anya's superpowers. Gil is proud to let her train with Ms. Marvel and Wonder Man. Anya's training will essentially comprise her accompanying Wonder Man and Ms. Marvel on missions and playing "sidekick" to the two. Anya accompanies the two to Stark Tower, where she forces herself into a meeting with Iron Man, and then on a mission to capture Shroud and Arachne. Arachne escapes, but the Shroud is captured and taken into S.H.I.E.L.D. custody. A strike team led by Ms. Marvel and Wonder Man arrives at the home of Arachne's parents to take into custody. After a battle between the heroes, Arachne is arrested and her daughter Rachel Carpenter forcibly separated. Anya is deeply shaken by the ordeal and states that if being a hero means separating a mother from her child, she wants no part of it. However, she remains part of the pro-Registration strikeforce.

Before a battle with Doomsday Man, Ms. Marvel asks Anya to go get help if she fails to make contact by a certain time. Eventually, Anya joins the battle, and Doomsday Man rips away her exoskeleton, severely injuring her. Although she eventually recovers, her exoskeleton is gone. Gil takes out a restraining order to keep Ms. Marvel away from her, but Anya secretly visits Ms. Marvel to say she is not to blame for what happened. Soon after, Anya quits her job, and is confronted by Arachne who is enraged and demands to know Rachel's whereabouts. Anya manages to subdue Arachne, but chooses to accompany Ms. Marvel and Arachne in their attempt to find Rachel, even though that means violating the restraining order her father has placed against Ms. Marvel.

Anya gets into a fight with Gil for treating her like a child after Gil accuses her of seeing Ms. Marvel. She tells Gil at least Carol is showing her how to grow up. She is later captured by Chilean soldiers who deliver her to the Puppet Master; she is added to a collection of female heroes that includes Stature, Dusk, Tigra, and Silverclaw. During a battle with Ms. Marvel's team, Anya is partially subdued by Machine Man and Sleepwalker, and resists the Puppet Master's command that she kill Ms. Marvel whom she sees as a mother figure.

=== Grim Hunt ===
During the Kravinoff family's hunt for "Spiders", Anya is targeted as a sacrifice. Spider-Man, Julia, Madame Web, and Kaine come to her aid. Despite their help, Anya is knocked out by Ana Kravinoff, Alyosha Kravinoff, and Vladimir Kravinoff. Anya is captured along with Julia and Madame Web while Kaine (who was dressed as Spider-Man) is sacrificed as part of a ritual for Kraven the Hunter's resurrection. Spider-Man manages to free them and she assists Spider-Man in taking down the Kravinoffs. After the experience, Julia (who received Madame Web's powers) decides to give the old Spider-Girl costume to Anya, despite the fact that Anya has no powers. She is referred to as Spider-Girl, much to her chagrin.

=== Young Allies ===
Anya (still known as Araña) was next seen teaming up with the new Nomad (Rikki Barnes) to investigate the Secret Empire. Although information Araña obtained from her father turned out to be a trap, the pair nonetheless bonded, and shared secret identities. Both she and Rikki join the superhero group Young Allies together.

Anya joins the superhero group Young Allies along with her friend Rikki despite being depowered. During the team's first storyline, Anya and Rikki are kidnapped by a team of teenaged supervillains known as the Bastards of Evil. The Bastards link up a video feed of the bound and gagged heroines across televisions, computers, and cell phones throughout New York City, with the intent of executing the girls to build up reputations. After having the duct tape ripped from her mouth by Electro's daughter Aftershock, Anya divides the villains by informing them that Aftershock has lied about her parentage to get a spot on the Bastards. With their captors distracted, Anya and Rikki escape and ultimately defeat the Bastards once the rest of the Young Allies arrive.

=== Spider-Girl ===
Anya accepts the "Spider-Girl" moniker and begins operating solo, although she frequently interacts with her Young Allies teammates such as Rikki as well as Spider-Man and the Invisible Woman. When Gil is killed, she fights the Red Hulk who she initially believes is responsible. She is eventually convinced that the Red Hulk did not kill Gil, but rather a target of the assassination attempt that also killed her father. Spider-Girl eventually is able to stop the Raven Society organization that was behind Gil's death, and the intervening time shows that she made friends with Rocky Flint and fought Ana Kravinoff, the new Hobgoblin, and Screwball.

Later, the Young Allies and several members of the Avengers Academy are kidnapped by Arcade. Anya manages to escape, and works with Reptil to rescue the remaining captives. The two teens flirt with one another, and Anya ends up giving her phone number to Reptil once Arcade is defeated.

During the Fear Itself storyline, Anya, X-23, Amadeus Cho, Power Man, and Thunderstrike are teleported to a station in the middle of the Pacific Ocean where they fight samurai Shark Men. Later, Anya and the Young Allies are almost beaten by Hydro-Man until Spider-Man shows up.

=== Spider-Island ===
During the Spider-Island storyline, Anya is attacked by the Sisterhood of the Wasp. She ends up getting an unlikely ally in the Hobgoblin, who flies her to see the Kingpin. When Spider-Girl asks why the Kingpin wants her help, the Kingpin reveals that the crime lord has developed Spider abilities and ended up targeted by the Sisterhood of the Wasp. The Kingpin tells Spider-Girl of locating the Central Wasp Nest. Spider-Girl refuses the Kingpin's help and tries enlisting the help of the Young Allies and other heroes, but they are too preoccupied with the Spider outbreak to help. The new Madame Web approaches Spider-Girl and tells her that for better or for worse, she has to team up with her enemy. As they battle against the Society of Wasps, their queen reveals that they have developed a venom to kill all spider-powered people in Manhattan. Spider-Girl, Hobgoblin, the Kingpin, and the Hand fight against the Society of Wasps until Spider-Girl realizes what Madame Web really meant by teaming up with her enemy. She gets everyone fighting the Wasps to temporarily assist the Wasps in fighting the spider invasion so the spiders cannot help Adriana Soria, allowing Spider-Man and the Avengers to defeat the Spider-Queen without being overrun by the spiders. In the aftermath, Anya retains her spider powers.

=== Enrolled at Avengers Academy ===
Anya is part of the new class of students when the Avengers Academy moves to the West Coast Avengers' former headquarters. During the Inhumanity crossover, Anya gets help from various Avengers when trying to track down her social studies teacher who was kidnapped while inside an Inhuman cocoon.

=== Spider-Verse ===
During the "Spider-Verse" storyline, Spider-Girl joined Spider-Man, Spider-Woman and other spider totems from all over the multiverse to fight the Inheritors who threatened to destroy every Spider from all realities in the event Spider-Verse. Her abilities were indispensable for the Spider-Army to discover the Inheritors' plan, as her powers and relationship with the Spider Society allowed her to read their scrolls.

After the Inheritors were defeated and exiled to an irradiated Earth, the spider totems proceeded to return to their respective realities. After the universe of Spider-UK was revealed to have been destroyed while he was fighting the Inheritors, he decided to stay in Loomworld, the former base of the Inheritors, and use the Web of Life and Destiny to reach out to any reality in need of a Spider-Man. Spider-Girl decided to join him to utilize her knowledge of the totems.

=== Secret Wars ===
During the Secret Wars event when all universes were destroyed and their remains formed a single planet called Battleworld, Anya and Spider-UK found themselves in the Battleworld domain called Arachnia with no memories of how they got there. They eventually discovered and teamed up with other Spider-powered people (consisting of Spider-Woman, Spider-Ham, Spider-Man Noir, and Spider-Man of India), neither of whom remembered their previous encounter during the original Spider-Verse.

=== End of the Spider-Verse ===
During the "End of the Spider-Verse" storyline, Anya helps in the fight against Shathra. After Shathra was killed, Anya revives those who were struck by the totem dagger, which also revived the then-unknown Spider-Boy. Spider-Boy later visits Anya in an attempt to restore the universe's memories of him.

== Powers and abilities ==
=== As Araña ===
As Araña, she originally possessed superhuman strength (able to lift three tons), speed, stamina, reflexes/reactions, agility, coordination, balance, and endurance. Anya had the ability to cling to walls, and to sprout a spider-like exoskeleton around her body which enhanced these abilities and protected her from damage. When her exoskeleton was ripped out by Doomsday Man, she retained her primary powers. Anya invented spider-like grappling hooks, which she uses to swing from buildings and as whip-like weapons, though she has found these to be harder to use since losing her abilities.

=== As Spider-Girl ===
Writer Paul Tobin stated In an interview with Newsarama that as Spider-Girl, the character initially lacks superpowers, but Tobin will be "staying away from having her feel crippled by any power loss; it's for sure on her mind, but Anya is a character that wants to focus on what she can do." Tobin revealed that Anya regains her powers in the "Spider-Island" storyline. The Jackal copies Spider-Man's powers into the entire non-superhuman population of New York, including Anya. Anya submits to the mass cure, but retains her copy of these powers nonetheless.

== Other versions ==
=== Marvel Team-Up: League of Losers ===
An alternate timeline version of Araña features in an arc of Robert Kirkman's Marvel Team-Up along with other lesser-known heroes, dubbed the League of Losers. The group travels to the future to prevent the villain Chronok from stealing Reed Richards' time machine and killing many major heroes. Araña is killed in an explosion, while the rest of the team searches for a time machine so that they can travel to the future.

=== MC2 ===
In the MC2 continuity, an adult version of Anya Corazon as Araña, still accompanied by Miguel (sometimes being referred to as Michael), tests Spider-Girl, then covers for her, posing as a fake seer to throw the Hobgoblin off track when he tries to find her weaknesses. She later takes over Spider-Girl's body in an attempt to take down Black Tarantula, but the two end up switching bodies. Using Spider-Girl's body, Anya is able to get close to Black Tarantula to kiss. However, Black Tarantula, who had been kissed by Anya once before, recognizes and attacks her, using his own powers to reverse the mind-switch. It is later revealed Anya and Black Tarantula have a personal history with one another, and they bond once more when the Tarantula is attacked by Spider-Girl's symbiotic clone April. As the gang war concludes, Black Tarantula agrees to give up his title as the current Kingpin of Crime and decides to marry Anya.

=== What If? ===
In the What If? Spider-Man: Grim Hunt, an alternative possibility for the events of Grim Hunt begins with the decision of Spider-Man to kill Kraven. Araña, scarred by things that she should not have seen is transported by the new Madame Web to her residence. Later Madame Web appears in her room in the middle of the night asking Anya to be Spider-Girl. Anya refuses the proposal because she is worried that if she fights against Peter she will make the same decision he made. In the middle of the battle Madame Web teleports herself to get Araña to confront and defeat Peter. Peter ends up blinded by a shotgun he was attempting to use on her. Araña takes over as the head Spider while Peter is left blind and distant from Mary Jane.

== In other media ==
=== Television ===
- Anya Corazon appears in Spider-Man, voiced by Melanie Minichino. This version is a best friend of Peter Parker / Spider-Man, Miles Morales / Ultimate Spider-Man, Gwen Stacy / Ghost-Spider and Harry Osborn / Hobgoblin and a student at Horizon High. After developing spider-powers during the five-part episode "Spider-Island", she later adopts the Spider-Girl alias in subsequent seasons.
- Anya Corazon as Spider-Girl appears in Marvel Super Hero Adventures, voiced by Gigi Saul Guerrero.
- Anya Corazon as Iron Spider appears in Iron Man and His Awesome Friends, voiced by Lena Josephine Marano.

=== Film ===
- Anya Corazon as Spider-Girl makes a non-speaking appearance in Spider-Man: Across the Spider-Verse. This version is a member of Miguel O'Hara's Spider-Society.
- Anya Corazon appears in Madame Web, portrayed by Isabela Merced. This version lives alone due to her father being deported sometime prior. After being targeted by Ezekiel Sims, whose prophetic visions lead him to believe she might kill him in the future, Corazon is rescued by Cassie Web, who eventually trains her in becoming a superhero.

=== Video games ===
- Anya Corazon as Spider-Girl appears as a card in Marvel War of Heroes.
- Anya Corazon as Araña and Spider-Girl appears as separate unlockable playable characters in Spider-Man Unlimited.
- Anya Corazon as Spider-Girl appears as an unlockable playable character in Marvel Avengers Alliance.
- An amalgamated incarnation of Anya Corazon appears as an unlockable playable character in Marvel Avengers Academy, voiced by Daisy Guevera. This version resembles Araña, but is identified as Spider-Girl.
- Anya Corazon as Araña appears in Marvel Snap.

== Collected editions ==
- Araña Collections
  - Araña Vol. 1: Heart of the Spider (collects Amazing Fantasy #1-6, softcover ISBN 978-0785115069)
  - Araña Vol. 2: In The Beginning (collects Araña #1-6, softcover ISBN 978-0785117193)
  - Araña Vol. 3: Night of the Hunter (collects Araña #7-12, softcover ISBN 978-0785118534)
- Spider-Man: Grim Hunt crossover event (collects Amazing Spider-Man: Extra! #3, Web of Spider-Man #7, and Amazing Spider-Man #634-637, hardcover ISBN 978-0785146179, softcover ISBN 978-0785146186)
- Young Allies: Volume 1 (collects Young Allies #1-6, Firestar #1, and material from Age of Heroes #2, softcover ISBN 0-7851-4868-X)
- Spider-Girl Vol. 1: Family Values (collects Spider-Girl #1-8, and Amazing Spider-Man #648, softcover ISBN 978-0785146940)
- Spider-Island: Companion (collects The Amazing Spider-Girl #1-3, Spider-Island: Cloak & DAGGER #1-3, Spider-Island: Deadly Hands of Kung Fu #1-3, Herc #7-8, Spider-Island: Avengers #1, Spider-Island: Spider-Woman #1, Spider-Island: I Love New York City, Black Panther #524, Spider-Island: Heroes For Hire #1, hardcover ISBN 978-0785162285, softcover ISBN 978-0785162292)
