= Big Time (comics) =

2010–2011 Marvel Comics storylines

- Cover to The Amazing Spider-Man #648. Art by Humberto Ramos.
- Publisher: Marvel Comics
- Publication date: November 2010 – March 2011
- Genre: Superhero
- Title(s): The Amazing Spider-Man #648–656
- Main character: Spider-Man

Creative team
- Writer: Dan Slott
- Artist(s): Humberto Ramos; Marcos Martin; Stefano Caselli
- Editor: Stephen Wacker

"Big Time" is a series of comic book storylines in The Amazing Spider-Man, published by Marvel Comics from 2010 to 2011. It follows the 102 consecutive issues of the "Brand New Day" publishing scheme and is the first shift in publishing for The Amazing Spider-Man since "Brand New Day" began. The frequency of publication dropped from three issues monthly to two issues, but the length of the comic book expanded from 22 to 30 pages. This extra length is sometimes used for back-up stories and sometimes for a longer main story. Concurrently with the story going in The Amazing Spider-Man, Marvel also started the new series Spider-Girl vol. 2, Osborn, and Carnage, which are considered part of "Big Time." All nine issues of "Big Time" have sold out at Diamond Comic Distributors and have a second printing with a variant cover.

== Plot summary ==
=== "Kill to be You" ===
In The Amazing Spider-Man #648 through #651, Peter starts a new job at Horizon Labs after a recommendation from Marla Jameson to the head of the lab gets him the job. Phil Urich takes over the Hobgoblin identity after killing Daniel Kingsley, brother of Roderick Kingsley. Spider-Man is unable to stop the theft because of the Hobgoblin's Lunatic Laugh. Peter uses his new job at Horizon Labs to create a suit that uses harmonics to prevent the Lunatic Laugh from affecting him. Spider-Man and the Black Cat infiltrate the building of the Kingpin to get the experimental metal back.

In the back-up stories in The Amazing Spider-Man #649 through #651 Alistair Smythe breaks Mac Gargan out of prison and gives him a new Scorpion costume. These events directly lead into the "Revenge of the Spider-Slayer" story that follows.

=== "Revenge of the Spider-Slayer" ===
In The Amazing Spider-Man #652 through #654, titled the "Revenge of the Spider-Slayer," Alistair Smythe has created an army of Spider-Slayers by giving cybernetic implants to people with a grudge against J. Jonah Jameson. All of the Spider-Slayers, and Mac Gargan as the Scorpion, have a power similar to Spider-Man's spider-sense that makes them harder to hit and for Smythe to telepathically communicate with all of them. Smythe targets Jameson's family and friends so Jameson can feel the same pain Smythe felt when he lost his father. The New Avengers help Spider-Man fight the multiple threats, but Spider-Man is forced to build a bomb that will destroy the spider-sense of the Spider-Slayers so they can be defeated. Gargan prevents Spider-Man from fleeing after he plants the bomb, so he is forced to set it off while he is still within its radius and he loses his spider-sense as well. After his army of Spider-Slayers is stopped Smythe tries to kill Jameson himself, but Marla Jameson jumps in the way to save the life of her husband.

=== "No One Dies" ===
In The Amazing Spider-Man #655 and #656, titled "No One Dies," a funeral is held for Marla Jameson. Peter has a nightmare where he sees everyone who has ever died in his life (including Gwen Stacy, Ben Reilly, Ezekiel Sims, Frederick Foswell, Bennett Brant, George Stacy, and Charlamange from Spider-Man Vs. Wolverine). When Peter wakes up, he determines to be a better Spider-Man by vowing "as long as he's around no one dies". He then faces off against Massacre, a new villain who has no emotion and more incentive to kill. Without his spider-sense Spider-Man is hit by a bullet shot by Massacre, so he builds a new Spider-Armor to combat Massacre. Using this, he defeats the villain and confronts Jameson about his new stance, who wants to give the death penalty to Smythe for killing Marla and to Massacre for the people he killed.

== Reception ==
- The Amazing Spider-Man #648 received an A rating from Weekly Comic Book Review, a rating of 6.5 out of 10 from IGN, and a rating of 4.5 out of 5 from Comic Book Resources.
- The Amazing Spider-Man #649 received an A rating from Weekly Comic Book Review, a rating of 7.5 out of 10 from IGN, and a rating of 4.0 out of 5 from Comic Book Resources.
- The Amazing Spider-Man #650 received an A rating from Weekly Comic Book Review, a rating of 7.5 out of 10 from IGN, and a rating of 3.0 out of 5 from Comic Book Resources.
- The Amazing Spider-Man #651 received a B+ rating from Weekly Comic Book Review a rating of 7.0 out of 10 from IGN, and a rating of 4.0 out of 5 from Comic Book Resources.
- The Amazing Spider-Man #652 received a B rating from Weekly Comic Book Review and a rating of 7.5 out of 10 from IGN.
- The Amazing Spider-Man #653 received a B+ rating from Weekly Comic Book Review and a rating of 6.5 out of 10 from IGN.
- The Amazing Spider-Man #654 received a B− rating from Weekly Comic Book Review, a rating of 7.5 out of 10 from IGN, and a rating of 4.5 out of 5 from Comic Book Resources.
- The Amazing Spider-Man #655 received an A rating from Weekly Comic Book Review, a rating of 9.0 out of 10 from IGN, and a rating of 5.0 out of 5 from Comic Book Resources.
- The Amazing Spider-Man #656 received a B rating from Weekly Comic Book Review, a rating of 7.0 out of 10 from IGN, and a rating of 4.0 out of 5 from Comic Book Resources.

== Collected editions ==
- A comic book reprinting of The Amazing Spider-Man #648-650 was published as Amazing Spider-Man: Big Time #1 in June 2011.
- Spider-Man: Big Time Volume 1 (collects The Amazing Spider-Man #648-651, hardcover, 144 pages, February 16, 2011, ISBN 978-0-7851-4623-0)
- Spider-Man: Matters of Life and Death (collects The Amazing Spider-Man #652-657, 654.1, hardcover, 216 pages, May 25, 2011, ISBN 0-7851-5102-8)

== See also ==
- Spider-Man Collected Editions
- "The Gauntlet" and "Grim Hunt"
- "One Moment in Time"
- "Spider-Island"
- List of issues
