= Mark Brooks (illustrator) =

American comic book artist

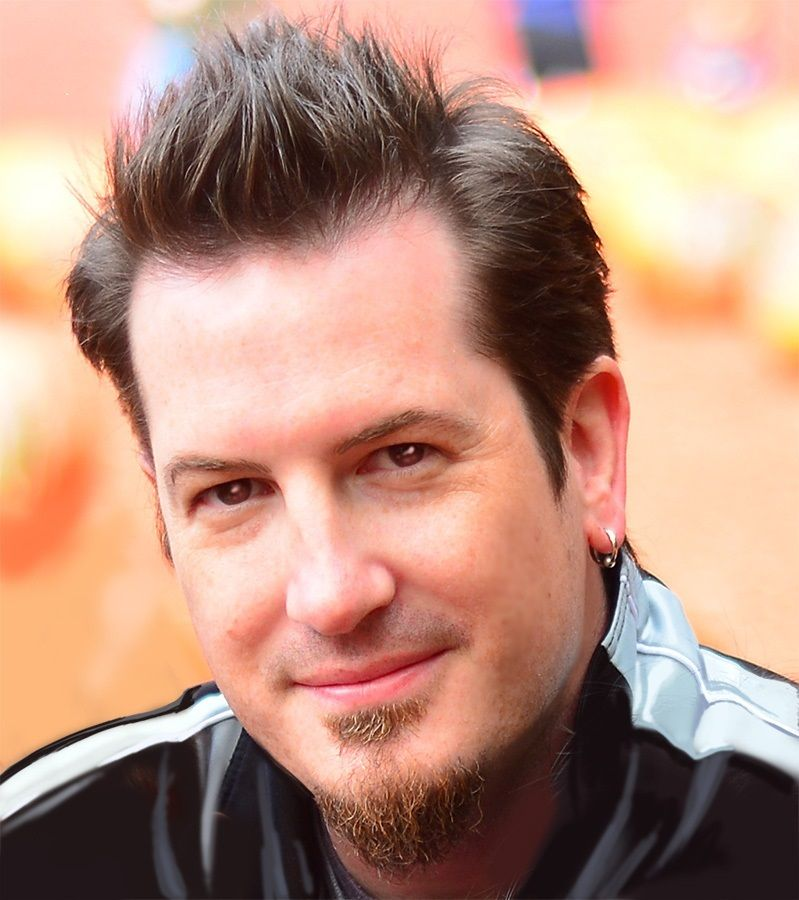
- Born: April 12, 1973 (age 53)
- Areas: Penciller, cover artist
- Notable works: Avengers, Secret Empire, Han Solo
- Awards: Inkpot Award (2014)

Mark Brooks is an American comic book artist. For his cover art, he was awarded the Inkpot Award in 2014.

He has produced designs for a line of Marvel figures manufactured by Sideshow Collectibles.

== Career ==
Brooks' first published work was in 10th Muse, written by Marv Wolfman for Image Comics, in which he penciled the Atlas back-up stories in 2001. His first cover was a variant for the Atlas #1 one-shot from Avatar Press, which he also penciled. His other early work included illustrating the covers for Transformers: More Than Meet the Eyes for Dreamwave Productions, G.I Joe vs. the Transformers for Devil's Due Publishing, and Ultraman Tiga for Dark Horse Comics.

In 2004, Brooks penciled and provided the cover art for a number of issues of Marvel Age Spider-Man, his first collaboration with Marvel. He then worked on Cable & Deadpool for two issues before moving on to illustrate the first arc of Amazing Fantasy (vol.2) featuring Anya Corazon. He signed an exclusive contract with Marvel the same year. Since then he has worked on various projects including penciling issues of The Amazing Spider-Man, Ultimate Spider-Man Annual, Ultimate X-Men, Ultimate Fantastic Four, and providing cover art for titles such as Araña: The Heart of the Spider, Avengers: The Initiative, Dark Reign: Young Avengers, and X-Men: Legacy.

In 2014, Brooks was awarded the Inkpot Award.

In 2016, Brooks gained critical acclaim and was nominated for the Eisner Award in two categories, best penciler/inker and best limited series, for his work in the Han Solo miniseries with writer Marjorie Liu, set between the original Star Wars film and The Empire Strikes Back.

In 2017, Brooks was the main cover artist for the 12-issue Secret Empire crossover storyline written by Nick Spencer.

In 2022, Brooks was the main cover artist for the Judgment Day crossover event written by Kieron Gillen.

== Awards and recognition ==
- June 2010 Inkwell Awards Ambassador (June 2010 – present)
- August 2014 Inkpot Award Winner
- May 2017 Eisner Award Nominee: Best Limited Series (Han Solo)
- May 2017 Eisner Award Nominee: Best Penciler/Inker (Han Solo)

== Technique ==
Brooks primarily pencils his work digitally before colouring and rendering them with markers, coloured pencils, and acrylic paint.

His style has been compared to that of artist Alex Ross, who is known for his realistic depiction of comic book characters.

== Bibliography ==
=== Interior work ===
==== DC Comics ====
- Robotech Sourcebook #1 (with various artists) (2003)

==== Marvel Comics ====
- Marvel Age Spider-Man #1–2, 4, 6 (2004)
- Cable & Deadpool #1–2 (2004)
- Amazing Fantasy (Vol. 2) #1–2, 5–6 (2004)
- Amazing Spider-Man (Vol. 1) #515–518 (with Mike Deodato Jr.) (2004–2005)
- X-Men: Age of Apocalypse One Shot #1 (eight pages, with various artists) (2005)
- X-Men Unlimited (Vol. 2) #9 (11 pages, with Sam Kieth) (2005)
- Ultimate Spider-Man Annual #1–2 (2005–2006)
- New X-Men (Vol. 2) #20–22; (with Paul Pelletier): #23 (2006)
- Ultimate X-Men (Vol. 1) #75 (12 pages, with Ben Oliver), 94–95, 97–100 (2006–2009)
- X-Men Annual (Vol. 3) #1 (2007)
- Ultimate Fantastic Four (Vol. 1) #39–41, 47–49 (2007–2008)
- Young Avengers Presents #4 (2008)
- Ultimate X-Men/Ultimate Fantastic Four Annual #1 (with Dan Panosian) (2008)
- Dark Reign: Young Avengers #1–5 (2009)
- Cloak and Dagger (Vol. 4) #1 (2010)
- Age of Heroes #2 (2010)
- Origins of Marvel Comics: X-Men #1 (one page, with various artists) (2010)
- Spider-Man: Back in Quack #1 (with Ray-Anthony Height and Joe Suitor) (2010)
- Fantastic Four (Vol. 1) #588 (with Nick Dragotta) (2011)
- Thor (Vol. 1) #620.1 (2011)
- Uncanny X-Force (Vol. 1) #11–13 (2011)
- Wolverine and the X-Men: Alpha & Omega #1–5 (with Roland Boschi) (2012)
- AvX: Consequences #4 (2012)
- Avengers: Heroes Welcome #1 (2014)
- Ultimate Spider-Man (Vol. 1) #200 (with various artists) (2014)
- Han Solo #1–5 (2016–2017)
- Star Wars Saga #1 (2017)
- Giant Size X-Men: Tribute to Wein & Cockrum #1 (with various artists) (2020)

==== Other publishers ====
- 10th Muse #7–9 (Image Comics, 2001)
- Atlas #1 (Avatar Press, 2002)
- Judo Girl #1 (Alias Enterprises, 2005)

=== Cover work ===
==== DC Comics ====
- Detective Comics (Vol. 3) #982–989, 991–995, 1002–1004 (variant covers) (2018–2019)
- Heroes in Crisis #1 (variant cover) (2018)
- DCeased #6 (2019)
- Harley Quinn and Poison Ivy #6 (variant covers) (2020)
- Batman/Superman (Vol 2) #13 (variant cover) (2020)

==== Marvel Comics ====
- Marvel Age Spider-Man #1–6 (2004)
- Amazing Fantasy (Vol. 2) #1–6 (2004)
- Cable & Deadpool #5, 29, 34–35 (2004–2006)
- Araña: The Heart of the Spider #1–12 (2005–2006)
- Official Handbook of the Marvel Universe: X-Men - Age of Apocalypse 2005 #1 (2005)
- Ororo: Before the Storm #1 (2005)
- X-Men Unlimited (Vol. 2) #9 (2005)
- New X-Men (Vol. 2) #20–25 (2006)
- Ultimate Spider-Man Annual #2–3 (2006–2008)
- What If? Spider-Man The Other #1 (2006)
- X-Men Annual (Vol. 3) #1 (2007)
- Ultimate Fantastic Four (Vol. 1) #47–49 (2007–2008)
- Avengers: The Initiative #14–20 (2008–2009)
- Ultimate X-Men (Vol. 1) #98–99 (2009)
- Hulk: Broken Worlds #1 (2009)
- Dark Reign: Young Avengers #1–5 (2009)
- Ultimatum: X-Men Requiem #1 (2009)
- Cloak and Dagger (Vol. 4) #1 (2010)
- Uncanny X-Men: The Heroic Age #1 (2010)
- X-Men Origins: Deadpool #1 (2010)
- Rawhide Kid (Vol. 4) #3 (2010)
- Captain America (Vol. 1) #612 (variant cover) (2010)
- Secret Avengers (Vol. 1) #7 (variant cover) (2010)
- The Incredible Hulks #618 (variant cover) (2010)
- New Avengers (Vol. 2) #7 (variant cover) (2011)
- The Amazing Spider-Man (Vol. 1) #651 (variant cover) (2011)
- 5 Ronin #2 (variant cover) (2011)
- Uncanny X-Force (Vol. 1) #11 (variant cover) (2011)
- Wolverine and the X-Men: Alpha & Omega #1–2 (2012)
- X-Men: Legacy #260.1–275 (2012)
- Uncanny Avengers (Vol. 1) #1 (variant cover) (2012)
- AvX: Consequences #4 (variant cover) (2012)
- Avengers (Vol. 5) #1, 3 (variant covers) (2012)
- AAFES #14 (2013)
- A + X #4 (variant cover) (2013)
- Fearless Defenders #1–12 (2013)
- Guardians of the Galaxy (Vol. 3) #1, 5 (variant covers) (2013)
- Secret Avengers (Vol. 2) #4 (variant cover) (2013)
- X-Men (Vol. 4) #1 (variant cover) (2013)
- Age of Ultron #10 (2013)
- Infinity #1 (variant cover) (2013)
- Deadpool (Vol. 5) #21–25.NOW, 27, 30–32, 34–39, 41–42; (variant covers): 28–29 (2013–2015)
- Revolutionary War: Alpha #1 (2014)
- Revolutionary War: Dark Angel #1 (2014)
- Revolutionary War: Knights of Pendragon #1 (2014)
- Revolutionary War: Death's Head II #1 (2014)
- Superior Spider-Man (Vol. 1) #27.NOW (2014)
- Revolutionary War: Supersoldiers #1 (2014)
- Avengers: Heroes Welcome #1 (2014)
- Avengers Undercover #1 (variant cover) (2014)
- Revolutionary War: Motormouth #1 (2014)
- Revolutionary War: Warheads #1 (2014)
- Revolutionary War: Omega #1 (2014)
- Magneto (Vol. 3) #3 (variant cover) (2014)
- Avengers World #7 (2014)
- Original Sins #1–5 (2014)
- Uncanny X-Men Special #1 (variant cover) (2014)
- Iron Man Special #1 (variant cover) (2014)
- Nova Special #1 (variant cover) (2014)
- Ant-Man (Vol. 1) #1–5 (2015)
- Star Wars (Vol. 2) #13–14; (variant cover): #1 (2015–2016)
- Darth Vader (Vol. 1) #14–15, 19–20; (variant cover): #1 (2015–2016)
- Princess Leia #1 (variant cover) (2015)
- Kanan - The Last Padawan #1–5 (2015)
- Secret Wars #1, 5 (variant cover) (2015)
- Spider-Gwen (Vol. 1) #1 (variant cover) (2015)
- X-Tinction Agenda #1 (variant cover) (2015)
- Ant-Man: Last Days #1 (variant cover) (2015)
- Astonishing Ant-Man #1–3, 5–7 (2015–2016)
- Kanan #7–12 (2015–2016)
- Star Wars: Vader Down #1 (2016)
- All-New, All-Different Avengers #4 (variant cover) (2016)
- A-Force (Vol. 2) #3 (variant cover) (2016)
- Black Panther (Vol. 6) #1 (variant cover) (2016)
- Han Solo #1 (variant cover) (2016)
- Champions (Vol. 2) #1 (variant cover) (2016)
- Deadpool (Vol. 6) #25 (variant cover) (2017)
- Star Wars: Darth Maul #1 (variant cover) (2017)
- Secret Empire #0–10 (2017)
- Darth Vader (Vol. 2) #1 (variant cover) (2017)
- Astonishing X-Men (Vol. 4) #1 (variant cover) (2017)
- Journey to Star Wars: The Last Jedi - Captain Phasma #1 (variant cover) (2017)
- Secret Empire Omega #1 (2017)
- Marvel Legacy (Vol. 1) #1 (variant cover) (2017)
- Star Wars: Doctor Aphra (Vol. 1) #14 (variant cover) (2017)
- Phoenix Resurrection: The Return of Jean Grey #1 (variant covers) (2017)
- The Avengers (Vol. 1) #675–690 (2018)
- Avengers Universe (UK) (Vol. 3) #3–5, 7, 9–10, 19 (2018–2019)
- The New Mutants: Dead Souls #1 (variant covers) (2018)
- Cosmic Ghost Rider #1 (variant covers) (2018)
- The Amazing Spider-Man (Vol. 5) #24, 49 (variant covers) (2018–2020)
- Tony Stark: Iron Man #2, 15 (variant covers) (2018)
- Fantastic Four (Vol. 6) #25–36; (variant covers): #1, 5 (2018–2021)
- Extermination #1-5 (2018–2019)
- Uncanny X-Men (Vol. 5) #4 (variant cover) (2019)
- Infinity Wars #6 (variant covers) (2018)
- Captain Marvel (Vol. 10) #1, 9–16 (variant covers) (2019–2020)
- Avengers No Road Home #1 (variant covers) (2019)
- Conan the Barbarian (Vol. 3) #4 (variant cover) (2019)
- Deadpool (Vol. 7) #14 (variant cover) (2019)
- Black Cat (Vol. 1) #2 (variant covers) (2019)
- House of X #1 (variant covers) (2019)
- Powers of X #1 (variant covers) (2019)
- Marvel Comics #1000 (variant covers) (2019)
- X-Men (Vol. 5) #1, 6 (variant covers) (2019)
- Mighty World of Marvel (Vol. 7) #21 (variant cover) (2019)
- Amazing Mary Jane #1 (variant covers) (2019)
- X-Men/Fantastic Four (Vol. 2) #1–4 (variant covers) (2020)
- Iron Man (Vol. 6) #1 (variant cover) (2020)
- X of Swords: Creation #1 (variant cover) (2020)
- Avengers (Vol. 8) #37 (variant cover) (2020)
- Demon Days: X-Men #1 (variant cover) (2021)
- Captain America Anniversary Tribute #1 (variant cover) (2021)
- Black Widow (Vol. 8) #9–10 (variant covers) (2021)
- X-Men: Trial of Magneto #1 (variant cover) (2021)
- Inferno (Vol. 2) #1 (variant covers) (2021)
- X Lives of Wolverine #3 (variant cover) (2022)
- Immortal X-Men #1–8 (2022)
- Captain America (Vol. 10) #0 (variant cover) (2022)
- A.X.E.: Judgment Day #1–6 (2022)
- Avengers Assemble: Alpha #1 (2022)

==== Other publishers ====
- Atlas #1 (variant cover) (Avatar Press, 2002)
- G.I. Joe vs. the Transformers #3–4 (variant covers) (Devil's Due Publishing, 2003)
- Transformers: More than Meets the Eye #3–4 (Dreamwave Productions, 2003)
- Voltron: Defender of the Universe #0 (Dreamwave Productions, 2003)
- Misplaced #2 (Image, 2003)
- Ultraman Tiga #2–3 (Dark Horse, 2003)
- Judo Girl #1 (variant cover) (Alias Enterprises, 2005)
