= End of the Spider-Verse =

Marvel Comics comic book storyline

- Publisher: Marvel Comics
- Publication date: October 2022 – April 2023
- Genre: Superhero
Title(s)
Spider-Man Vol 4 #1-7
- Main characters: Spider-Man; Miles Morales; Morlun; Spider-Gwen; Silk; Julia Carpenter; Black Cat; Spider-Woman; Mayday Parker; Anya Corazon; Spider-Punk; Spider-Man 2099

Creative team
- Writer: Dan Slott
- Artist: Mark Bagley
- Inker: John Dell
- Letterer: Joe Caramagna
- Colorist: Edgar Delgado
- Editor: Nick Lowe

"End of the Spider-Verse" is a 2022–2023 comic book storyline published by Marvel Comics. It features multiple alternative versions of Spider-Man that had appeared in various media, where they team up with Morlun to fight Shathra, the Spider-Wasp goddess. The event included appearances and cameos by a wide array of characters from over 50 years of Spider-Man comics and spinoffs. The event is the conclusion of the Spider-Verse events, and the sequel to Spider-Verse and Spider-Geddon. However, the event received mixed reviews from critics with critics criticizing the treatment of Spider-Gwen, story, and the underwhelming conclusion.

== Publication history ==
In May 2022, Marvel announced that Dan Slott would return to helm "what Slott and Marvel are billing as the final Spider-Verse story: End of the Spider-Verse". This started in August 2022 with a five-issue anthology miniseries, Edge of Spider-Verse, which was then followed by the core storyline beginning in October 2022 with the launch of the monthly Spider-Man ongoing by Slott and Mark Bagley. The anthology focused on multiversal variants of Spider-Man such as Anya Corazon / Araña, Spider-Woman / Gwen Stacy, and new spider-heroes such as Night-Spider (a variant of Felicia Hardy), Hunter-Spider (a variant of Sergei Kravenoff), and Spider-Laird. Following the success of both Edge of Spider-Verse and Spider-Man, Marvel announced a follow-up anthology, entitled Edge of Spider-Verse: Bleeding Edge, which would focus on other Spider-heroes in the aftermath of End of the Spider-Verse, like Spider-Rex, Spinstress, and Spider-Boy.

== Plot ==
=== Lead-up ===
On Earth-1740, the Redcoats are trapped by Spider-Laird who are trying to reclaim a ghost. He then meets three figures in spider-print hooded robes who identify Spider-Laird as Donald MacGargan before Madame Web arrives and helps stop them. On Earth-616, Anya Corazon is web-swinging around Manhattan. She witnesses a robbery and attempts to stop it, only to experience debilitating arm pain that prevents her from doing so. Madame Web later tells her that her totemic powers are reactivating and that the Sisterhood of the Wasp has returned. On Earth-66, flashbacks reveal the origins of Spider-Rex as a Pteranodon named Pter Ptarker who swapped bodies with the Tyrannosaurus Norranosaurman and gained spider-powers after the two were struck by a spider-filled meteor. On Earth-90214, Spider-Man Noir goes out crime-fighting and saves a woman from some criminals. The woman, later identified as Sharon, turns into a giant wasp and attacks him before he falls unconscious.

On Earth-65, Gwen Stacy has a gig with her band the Mary Janes when she gets a tip that Mysterio is nearby. During the concert, it is crashed by Mysterio, who she battles before being stung by a wasp. On Earth-834 in the City of London, Zarina Zahari / Spider-UK battles a mysterious dragon (which she claimed resembled a wyvern) that can transform others into humanoid dragons using its slime. After analyzing the slime, Zarina discovers that it is a prehistoric mutagen and develops an antidote to return the transformed to normal. Later, after Ramadan, she goes out to eat before being confronted by Madame Web. On Earth-001, Spiderling of Earth-18199 is repairing the tears in the Great Web of Life and Destiny. Upon coming across a primal strand, she views the history of the Web as it was created by Neith, the first Spider-Totem, and her sister Shathra. However, Shathra became jealous after her contributions went unrecognized and turned into a black monster who can generate wasps. In a Mini-Marvel story, Spider-Man, Miles Morales, and Ghost-Spider are about to play basketball when Spider-UK appears to warn them about the Sisterhood of the Wasp. They are attacked by a wasp, but Spider-UK is transported elsewhere before he can help.

Meanwhile, Spider-Man India fights various villains in various universes before returning to his own. On Earth-194, Felicia Hardy is attending the Delvarian Embassy and steals a spider-like idol that gives her spider powers. As Night-Spider, she comes into conflict with Jean DeWolff, but Anya Corazon rescues her before she can be arrested. On Earth-346, a young girl named Haruka Hida becomes Sakura Spider after a Hydra agent kills her father and is adopted by her Aunt Mei and Uncle Tsutomu. Sometime later, she is approached by Madame Web who asks her to come with her as the fate of every spider is at stake. (Note: A disclaimer after Sakura Spider's story advertises Sakura Spider's early adventures in Deadpool: Samurai.)

On Earth-616, Spider-Ham narrates that his dimensional travel watch has been malfunctioning as he moves across the rooftops. He ends up helping Pete Spiderman of Earth-91279 deal with muggers before being attacked by a wasp. On Earth-423, Princess Petra is moving through the marketplace when Bishop Octopus attacks looking for a crystal orb. Returning to her palace, Petra is confronted by her mother Mysteria, who locks her in her room to protect her. Petra is later visited by Norma the Fairy Gob-Mother, who gives her spider-powers to help reclaim the orb. Mysteria then takes the orb and becomes the Mysterious Empress before Petra stops her. Petra is later approached by Madame Web, Araña, and Spider-UK of Earth-834, who state that the Spider-Verse needs her magic. On Earth-53591, where everyone is a sentient vehicle, Peter Parkedcar confronts the illusionist REO Speedbuggy, also known as the Great Driver. After climbing up a building, he encounters Spider-UK of Earth-834 who tells him that the Spider-Verse needs him. On Earth-20023, Charlotte "Charlene" Webber operates as Sun-Spider in spite of her Ehlers–Danlos syndrome limiting her movement. After battling Doctor Octopus, she learns that he had only wanted to help her using his tentacles, which could help restore her mobility. Madame Web and Spider-UK later visit and recruit her into their spider-army.

On Earth-31, Sergei Kravinoff is bitten by a giant spider in Zimbabwe and becomes the Hunter-Spider. He battles and kills various animal-themed villains before encountering Madame Web, Araña, and Spider-UK of Earth-834. On Earth-71490, Peter Parker's classmate Cooper Coen saves him from the radioactive spider and gains spider-based abilities. After being outed as gay, he is taken in by his aunt Laurie and her wife Mel who inspire him to become a superhero. He battles the Chameleon during Janet van Dyne's fashion show before Spider-UK recruits him into the spider-army. In a "Syllie Spider" story drawn by P.T. Parker of Earth-22105, Syllie Spider is enjoying the flies he caught. Just then, he is confronted by Kingfisher and his menagerie who want the flies. He fights them off. Syllie Spider later breaks out of his drawing and eats some flies as P.T. Parker is scolded by J. Jonah Jameson about his bad artwork. Syllie Spider beats up Jameson and leaves with a fly to get a drink. He and the fly are then confronted by Madame Web and Spider-UK of Earth-834 who need his help.

=== Main plot ===
Peter Parker has been working with Norman Osborn at Oscorp ever since he was purified of his sins in "Sins Rising". Shathra has taken control of the Web of Life and Destiny on Loomworld and sends her spider wasps to Earth-616. While trying to stop a robber, Morlun appears out of nowhere. Spider-Man tries to fight Morlun, but Morlun easily defeats him, with Miles Morales, Jessica Drew, and Silk arriving to help Spider-Man. During the commotion, Spider-Man Noir arrives to seemingly help the heroes, but he then stabs Jessica Drew with a magic dagger which severs her connection to the Web of Life and causes her to disappear from existence. Morlun saves Spider-Man from Spider-Man Noir, telling him that he is on his side before a mutated Ghost-Spider, Spider-Punk, and Mayday Parker attack the heroes.

Shathra has been taking control of recent Spider-totems by mutating them, and she has been using Nestling (a mutated version of Anna-May Parker), Spider-Ham, and Spider-Man 2099 of Earth-2099) to kidnap other spider-totems. Spider-Man Noir and the rest of the mutated totems start attacking the 616 Spiders when Anya Corazon arrives with Spider-UK of Earth-834 to take them to the new Spider-Sanctuary on Earth-616 Beta. Zarina Zahari explains Earth-616 Beta was a "rough draft" of Earth-616 and it can be used to hide from Shathra due to it not being part of the Great Web. Spider-Man meets up with Night-Spider, Hunter-Spider, Sun-Spider, Princess Spinstress, Webster, and Web-Weaver. Julia Carpenter tells Spider-Man she needs him now because he is the Chosen One while Silk fixes his costume. Morlun tells Peter that following the "Sinister War" where Doctor Octopus knocked him out when Morlun was possessed by Kindred, he traveled back to Loomworld (Earth-001) where he finds out his family was eaten by a mutated Spider-Ma'am (an alternate version of Aunt May) after "Spider-Geddon". Morlun then attempted to confront Shathra, but was overwhelmed by her strength and ran away to team up with Julia Carpenter, Anya Corazon, and Zarina Zahari. As the team try to come up with a plan, Miles Morales learns that he was bitten by a Spider-Wasp and is slowly mutating, with Shathra now knowing where the spider totems are.

Spider-Man tries to stop the rest of the heroes and Morlun from killing Miles Morales. Julia Carpenter realizes that since Miles Morales is a being from two different Earths (due to the aftermath of "Secret Wars"), he is fighting off the mutation. Miles Morales tells everyone he will head back to Loomworld to take down Shathra, with Hunter-Spider going with him. Anya Corazon tells everyone that the first Spider-Totem created the Great Web within a hidden temple in Central America on Earth-616 and had a golden spider that could bring spider-totems back to life by restoring their connection to the Web. Spider-Man, Anya Corazon, and Night-Spider go get the golden spider while Morlun realizes that he can defeat Shathra with the dagger. Sun-Spider, Spinstress, and Web-Weaver go after him to prevent him from killing Spider-Man Noir, but Spinstress is bitten by a spider-wasp. The mutated Spinstress sends Spider-Gwen (who has the Great Web dagger), Mayday Parker, and other mutated totems to where Spider-Man, Night-Spider, and Anya Corazon are, with Spider-Gwen stabbing Spider-Man with the dagger and severing his connection to the Web of Life and Destiny.

Shathra's forces manage to kill the Norman Osborn of Earth-44145 and Spiders-Man of Earth-11580, but fail to prevent Norman Osborn from sending a mysterious canister that Shathra was looking for. Anya Corazon is distraught that Spider-Man is gone, but Night-Spider saves them by triggering a trap that distracts Shathra's forces before escaping. While sneaking in Loomsworld, Miles Morales overhears that Spider-Man is gone and he attacks Shathra but is quickly defeated. Miles Morales is thrown in a dungeon where he sees Mary Jane Watson of Earth-18119 (from "Amazing Spider-Man: Renew Your Vows"), Mayday Parker's father, and other Spider-totems who could not be mutated. Silk tries to convince Morlun that he should not kill other spider totems until they get a cure from Shathra's infection. Julia Carpenter, Anya Corazon, Night-Spider, and Zarina Zahari arrive with their backup: Peter Palmer, the Spider-Man of Earth-616 Beta. Meanwhile, the mysterious canister lands on Earth-616 in Oscorp Plaza where Peter Parker is working.

When Spider-Gwen stabbed Spider-Man, his entire history changed to the point where the spider bit Cindy Moon instead, resulting in the creation of Earth-616 Beta. When the Burglar arrives to rob Uncle Ben and Aunt May, Peter jumps in front of the bullet and his right leg is paralyzed. This gains the respect of Flash Thompson and Peter Parker is no longer an outcast. When Sandman attacks Midtown High School, Silk fights off Sandman and Peter Parker learns her secret identity and creates technology for her. After high school, Norman Osborn decides to hire Peter Parker to work for him. In the present day, Peter Parker receives the mysterious canister that Norman Osborn of Earth-44145 sent which contain the remaining spiders that composed Spiders-Man and ask for Peter's help.

As Shathra grows in power, she creates tendrils that reach across the multiverse, as Silk decides to go through with Morlun's plan with the dagger. Hunter-Spider arrives to tell Silk and Julia Carpenter that Miles Morales was kidnapped, and Julia Carpenter realizes that Peter Parker is still alive because Earth-616 has been transformed to a different world where Silk became the main spider-hero. Morlun tries to kill Silk, but she slashes him with the dagger, releasing the life energy he had consumed and reviving all the Spiders.

Morlun escapes in a weakened state and Peter uses a machine to send Shathra to another dimension and restore her human form. Neith arrives and helps Anya Corazon revive Jessica Drew, Kaine Parker, Peter, and the previously unknown Spider-Boy. He claims to have been Spider-Man's sidekick, but leaves after learning that nobody remembers him, while numerous other spider-people are left stranded on Earth-616.

== Critical reception ==
According to Comicbook Roundup, the entire storyline received an average rating of 7.3 out of 10 based on 46 reviews, which indicates mixed reviews from critics. Keigan Rea from AIPT gave the story a 4.5 out of 10 and wrote "This was a perfectly serviceable Spider-Man comic amidst far better Spider-Man stories. There is little reason to spend time on this, unless you’re the world’s biggest Mark Bagley fan. Even if you love Slott’s take on Peter, you’re probably better off rereading Spider-Island, or waiting for the Superior Spider-Man revival."

== Collected editions ==
=== Softcover ===
Title	Material collected	Year	ISBN
Edge of Spider-Verse: End of the Spider-Verse	Edge of Spider-Verse (2022) #1–5	February 1, 2023	978-1804910924
Spider-Man: End of the Spider-Verse	Spider-Man (2022) #1–7	June 6, 2023	978-1302946562
Edge of Spider-Verse: Bleeding Edge	Edge of Spider-Verse (2023) #1–4	October 3, 2023	978-1302953386
