= The Amazing Spider-Man Family =

Comic book series published by Marvel Comics

- Cover to Spider-Man Family #1 (April 2007)

Publication information
- Publisher: Marvel Comics
- Schedule: Bi-Monthly
- Format: Ongoing
- Publication date: April 2007 – August 2008
- Main character(s): Spider-Man; Spider-Girl

Creative team
- Written by: List: Sean McKeever Fred Van Lente Kurt Busiek Paul Benjamin Paul Tobin Chris Eliopoulos Jeff Parker Kevin Grevioux Dana Moreshead Abby Denson
- Penciller: List: Terrell Bobbett Federica Manfredi Pat Olliffe Yamanaka Akira David LaFuente Pierre Alary Leonard Kirk Clayton Henry Yamanaka Akira David Hahn
- Inker: List: Gary Martin Terry Pallot

Spider-Man Family (later retitled The Amazing Spider-Man Family) is a comic book series published by Marvel Comics.

== Publication history ==
It began as a series of one-shots written and penciled by various writers and artists before becoming a bi-monthly ongoing series with the first issue cover-dated February 2007. Its initial writer was Sean McKeever. Each issue of Spider-Man Family contained brand new stories featuring Spider-Man and his supporting cast, reprints of classic Spider-Man tales, and an English translation of the original Japanese manga, Spider-Man J.

In June 2008, Spider-Man Family was relaunched as The Amazing Spider-Man Family, and became a showcase title for many of the divergent timelines that were present at this point in the franchise. In addition to strips set in the Brand New Day timeline, a strip exploring the early days of Peter Parker's life as Spider-Man was also included. Another feature, Mr. and Mrs. Spider-Man, written by Tom DeFalco, took place within Marvel's MC2 continuity. In November 2008, Joe Quesada confirmed on his blog that cult favourite Spider-Girl would be moving to Amazing Spider-Man Family in April 2009.

On July 13, 2009, Marvel announced a new monthly anthology title, Web of Spider-Man, to replace The Amazing Spider-Man Family. Unlike The Amazing Spider-Man Family, it featured only new stories, with backup stories initially starring Spider-Girl, then switching to Jackpot.

== Contents ==
=== Mr. and Mrs. Spider-Man ===
Mr. and Mrs. Spider-Man is a short comic strip series published in the pages of The Amazing Spider-Man Family, in August 2008. It was written by Tom DeFalco, and illustrated by Ron Frenz and several other artists.

The series took place in the MC2 universe, and bridges the gap between the final issues of DeFalco's run on The Amazing Spider-Man and his future canon in Spider-Girl, taking place shortly after the renegade clone Kaine rescued an infant "Mayday" Parker from the clutches of Norman Osborn's agents and returned her safely to her parents Peter and Mary Jane. Peter continues his career as Spider-Man and begins to cope with the additional headaches of raising an infant daughter with his wife. According to DeFalco, the events of "The Final Chapter" take place two years after this series. Mayday is six months old when the series begins, and is two when Peter loses his leg in a final battle with the Green Goblin, ending his career as Spider-Man. The strip was intended to run in the closing issue of the Spider-Man Family volume, but was held back to launch within the rebranded title. A podcast interview with DeFalco in November 2008 confirmed that, due to Spider-Girl becoming an integral part of Amazing Spider-Man Family, Mr and Mrs. Spider-Man would become a casualty and be concluded. Only four storylines were written. The strips were later collected in a trade paperback of The Spectacular Spider-Girl.

== Collected editions ==
#	Title	Material collected	Released	Format	Pages	ISBN
1	Back in Black	Spider-Man Family #1-3	19 Sep 2007	Digest	104	978-0785126263
2	Untold Team-Ups	Spider-Man Family #4-6	26 Mar 2008	Digest	104	978-0785126270
3	Itsy-Bitsy Battles	Spider-Man Family #7-9	8 Oct 2008	Digest	104	978-0785129882
	Family Ties	Amazing Spider-Man Family #1-3; Marvel Graphic Novel No. 72 - Spider-Man: Fear Itself	27 May 2009	HC	152	978-0785138259
	Family Ties	Amazing Spider-Man Family #1-3; Marvel Graphic Novel No. 72 - Spider-Man: Fear Itself	19 Aug 2009	TPB	152	978-0785135173
	The Short Halloween	Amazing Spider-Man Family #4-6; Spider-Man: The Short Halloween	11 Nov 2009	HC	152	978-0785139027
	The Short Halloween	Amazing Spider-Man Family #4-6; Spider-Man: The Short Halloween	24 Mar 2010	TPB	152	978-0785138785

== See also ==
- Superman Family
- Batman Family
- Super-Team Family
