= Spider-Boy =

Superhero appearing in Marvel Comics publications

- Spider-Boy as seen on the cover of Spider-Boy #1. Art by Humberto Ramos.

Publication information
- Publisher: Marvel Comics
- First appearance: Spider-Man Vol. 4 #7 (April 2023)
- Created by: Dan Slott (writer); Humberto Ramos (artist)

In-story information
- Full name: Bailey Bartholomew Briggs
- Species: Human mutate
- Team affiliations: Spider-Army
- Partnerships: Peter Parker / Spider-Man
- Notable aliases: Spider-Boy; Spider-B
- Abilities: Superhuman strength, agility, stamina, and reflexes; Precognitive spider-sense; Wall-crawling; Venom bite; Spider-speaking

Spider-Boy (Bailey Bartholomew Briggs) is a superhero appearing in American comic books published by Marvel Comics. Created by writer Dan Slott and artist Humberto Ramos, the character first appeared in Spider-Man (End of the Spider-Verse) vol. 4 #7 (April 2023). He is a child superhero with spider-like abilities. Initially Spider-Man's sidekick, Spider-Boy was erased from existence and forgotten by everyone who knew him before being resurrected.

== Development ==
=== Concept and creation ===
Spider-Boy creator Dan Slott stated "So, the idea came from when we were writing. I said to my editor, "Wouldn't it be funny if there was one more guy? And now, no one remembers him." And we started talking about who that [could] be, what kind of character they would be. I was pitching really hard for it to be Spider-Boy. Why? This all-new character would be the youngest spider character we'd ever done because both Miles and Peter, when they got bit, were teenagers. I thought it would be really fun to see the adventures of a preteen Spider-Man character, someone Spider-Man won't want running around. It's child endangerment [laughs]. If you're Spider-Man, you're all about responsibility, and what kind of responsible hero would you be if you let this nine or ten-year-old kid run around and fight crime? So that's kind of where that came from." Slott later said Spider-Boy was created to be an entertaining Spider-Man supporting character, but became popular enough to get his own comic series.

=== Publication history ===
Spider-Boy debuted in Spider-Man vol. 4 #7 (April 2023), created by Dan Slott and Humberto Ramos. He later appeared in the 2023 Edge of Spider-Verse series, and in the 2023 Spider-Boy series, his first solo comic book series. The first monthly issue was released in November 2023. He also appeared in the 2023 Superior Spider-Man series, and in the 2023 Marvel Unlimited exclusive Infinity Comic series.

Slott left Marvel in 2025 to work for DC Comics, writing the series Superman Unlimited. As a result, Spider-Boy was cancelled after 20 issues.

== Fictional character biography ==
Bailey Briggs was originally a normal boy before being kidnapped by Madame Monstrosity, who intended to experiment on him and other humans to create human-animal hybrids. After Bailey's fellow prisoner Eli Hartman learns that Bailey was crossed with a spider, he and Bailey joke about the hypothetical combination of an elephant and a rhinoceros, which they call "Hellifino". Madame Monstrosity overhears this and decides to splice Eli with elephant and rhinoceros DNA, transforming him into a hybrid form dubbed Hellifino. Bailey managed to escape imprisonment and, after training with Daredevil to gain control of his powers, became Spider-Boy, Spider-Man's sidekick.

At some point, Bailey was attacked by Shathra and erased from history, effectively killing him. In the storyline "End of the Spider-Verse", following the defeat of Shathra and Morlun, Bailey is among their victims who are resurrected. After realizing that nobody remembers his existence, he leaves and ends up living at a F.E.A.S.T. building.

Madame Monstrosity sends Hellifino to capture Spider-Boy. When Hellifino battles Spider-Boy, he and Madame Monstrosity uncover a mark that Madame Monstrosity placed on the back of Bailey's neck, proving him as one of her experiments. Spider-Boy breaks the necklace around Hellifino as he advises him not to be a monster like everyone sees him as. Hellifino heads back to the Farm, claiming that Spider-Boy escaped.

After being captured by Madame Monstrosity, Spider-Boy reunites with his mother Tabitha, who has no memory of him and was transformed into a tabby cat Humanimal by Madame Monstrosity. Madame Monstrosity transforms herself into a chimeric form to battle Spider-Boy when he attempts to escape. The rest of the Humanimals learn the truth about Madame Monstrosity unable to restore them to their human forms. Madame Monstrosity is taken away by the High Evolutionary, who plans to experiment on her.

After Madame Monstrosity is defeated, the people she transformed into Humanimals are returned to normal after her husband Jeremy, who she transformed into an owl, works with Squeakerton, Mr. Cricket, Spider-Man, and Toy Soldier to modify her transformation chamber. Jeremy and Hellifino are unable to be returned to a human form and remain on the farm with Tabitha. Tabitha joins the F.E.A.S.T. staff, regains her memories, and learns Bailey's secret identity, but allows him to continue being a superhero.

Spider-Boy and Daredevil travel to Madripoor to take part in the Challenge of the Jade Dragon tournament. There, they take on different opponents, including Bullseye and Spider-Girl. After the tournament, Spider-Boy finds that Boy-Spider, a spider-like clone created by Madame Monstrosity using his DNA, is living with Tabitha after gaining the ability to assume a humanoid form. They have a brief fight until Tabitha breaks it up.

Spider-Boy saves Christina Xu from the Inner Demons, learning that one of the Inner Demons was spliced with an earthworm by Madame Monstrosity. Due to a key that Christina has, Spider-Boy plans to raid a bank that is owned by Mister Negative. Spider-Man confronts them in the bank and learns of why they are "robbing it". Just then, Negative enters with brainwashed police officers. Once in the vault, Spider-Boy and Christina find the files on the Humanimals that Madame Monstrosity made for Negative. Spider-Boy as Bailey Briggs pretends to get brainwashed in order to help defeat Negative and freeing everyone from the brainwashing. After Negative is arrested, Spider-Man tells Spider-Boy that their partnership is done because Spider-Boy broke Spider-Man's rule against battling "A-list villains", causing Spider-Man to briefly confiscate Spider-Boy's gear. Spider-Man eventually allows Bailey to be Spider-Boy again as they go on patrol.

== Powers and abilities ==
Spider-Boy possesses superpowers similar to those of Spider-Man. He can transform into a spider hybrid at will; in this form, Spider-Boy gains paralyzing venom, enhanced vision, and the ability to communicate with spiders. Additionally, he has a variety of the Spider-Sense that manifests as psychometry.

== Supporting characters ==
=== Enemies ===
Name / alter ego	Creator(s)	First appearance	Description
Madame Monstrosity	Dan Slott; Paco Medina	Amazing Spider-Man (vol. 6) #31 (August 2022)	Melodia Stillwell experiments on human beings to turn them into human/animal hybrids called Humanimals. She is the husband of James Stillwell and the mother of Farley Stillwell, Harlan Stillwell, and Shannon Stillwell.
Gutterball	Dan Slott; Paco Medina	Spider-Boy (vol. 2) #1 (November 2023)	A bowling-themed supervillain with a bowling ball for a head.
Balloon Man	Dan Slott; Paco Medina	Spider-Boy (vol. 2) #1 (November 2023)	Emilio Helio possesses gaseous powers after an accident that changed his respiratory system. This enables him to control gases including the helium in balloons.
Killionaire	Dan Slott; Paco Medina	Spider-Boy (vol. 2) #3 (March 2024)	A rich social media influencer.
Red Heron	Steve Foxe; Carola Borelli	Spider-Woman (vol. 8) #5 (May 2024)	A heron-masked villain who Spider-Woman helped Spider-Boy defeat.
Puzzle Man	Dan Slott; Jason Loo	Spider-Boy (vol. 2) #8 (August 2024)	Krys Crossman is a Daily Bugle worker who specializes in puzzles and breaks the fourth wall to challenge readers.
Funhouse / Spider-Girl	Dan Slott; Michael Cho	Spider-Boy (vol. 2) #11 (October 2024)	Maka Akana is the apprentice of the assassin Bullseye who is able to copy the powers of anyone who makes eye contact with her. After making eye contact with Spider-Boy causes her to acquire all his memories and manifesting his powers as a default ability, she makes it her mission to kill him, briefly taking the name "Spider-Girl" to compete against him at the Challenge of the Jade Dragon. Maka later reforms after cutting her ties with Bullseye.
Bada Bros	Dan Slott	Spider-Boy (vol. 2) #17 (May 2025)	Two supervillains who can manifest energy bombs and were hired by Killionaire.
Card Shark	Dan Slott	Spider-Boy (vol. 2) #20 (August 2025)	A villain in a card-themed shark suit.

== Other versions ==
An alternate future timeline version of Spider-Boy appears in Venom War.

== Reception ==
=== Critical response ===
Casey Donahue of Screen Rant named Bailey Briggs one of the best new heroes of 2023. D. R. Bickham of Comic Book Resources called Bailey Briggs one of the most interesting incarnations of Spider-Man, writing, "While his youth, quirkiness, and awkward similarities to his mentor make him immediately endearing to fans, another contributing factor to Spider-Boy's newfound popularity and staying power lies in his unique rogues gallery." George Marston of Newsarama referred to Bailey Briggs as one of Marvel's newest breakout characters.

=== Impact ===
In 2023, the introduction of Bailey Briggs as Spider-Boy in Spider-Man vol. 4 #7 was credited as one of the main reasons the comic book sold out. Matt Devoe of ComicBook.com ranked the comic book 1st in their "Top 10 Comic Books Rising in Value in the Last Week Include Midnight Sons and Tons of Spider-Verse" list. His appearance in Edge of Spider-Verse #3 was also credited as one of the key reasons the comic book sold out.

== Literary reception ==
=== Volumes ===
==== Spider-Boy (2023) ====
Diamond Comic Distributors reported that Spider-Boy #1 was the 3rd top advance-reordered comic book by retailers between November 20 to November 6, 2023. ComicHub reported that Spider-Boy #1 was the best-selling comic in November 2023. The ComicHub Top 200 Comics sales chart reflects sales data collected from the ComicHub system at comic shops across the globe that sell American comics. This report was created based on information from more than 125 stores that used the ComicHub system during the reporting period.

Sayantan Gayen of Comic Book Resources called Spider-Boy #1 a "positive debut issue," asserting that it offers the freshest take on an old formula from Marvel in recent history. He praised the potential for the character, noting that Bailey's future looks bright if the creators invest the necessary love to help him grow. Matthew Aguilar of ComicBook.com gave Spider-Boy #1 a score of 4 out of 5 stars, praising the emotional depth of Bailey's origin story and the poignant reunion that unfolds, calling it a "heartfelt" experience. He noted that the villains in the series have an appealing absurdity, which adds to its charm, with artist Paco Medina and colorist Erick Arciniega effectively embracing this whimsical style in their artwork and character designs. Aguilar also highlighted the entertaining second story, "Balloonacy," by Ty Templeton and Dee Cunniffe, appreciating the inclusion of Squirrel Girl and Tippy-Toe. He remarked that when Spider-Boy takes center stage, the series evokes a unique quality that feels special, leaving him eager to see where the story goes next.

== Collected editions ==
#	Title	Material collected	Pages	Format	Released	ISBN
1	End of the Spider-Verse	Spider-Man (vol. 3) #1–7	176	TPB	June 6, 2023	978-1302946562
2	Who Is Spider-Boy?	Spider-Man (vol. 3) #8–11	112	TPB	November 14, 2023	978-1302946579
1	The Web-Less Wonder	Spider-Boy #1–4; material from Amazing Spider-Man (vol. 6) #31	136	TPB	April 30, 2024	978-1302957155
2	Fun & Games	Spider-Boy #5–8	136	TPB	September 10, 2024	978-1302957162
3	The Dragon's Challenge	Spider-Boy #11–16	136	TPB	July 1, 2025	978-1302960377
4	Full Circle	Spider-Boy #17–20; Kidpool/Spider-Boy (2024) #1	136	TPB	November 11, 2025	978-1302963163
