= Eisner Award for Talent Deserving of Wider Recognition =

Eisner Award for Talent Deserving of Wider Recognition / Special Recognition
- Country: United States
- First award: 1995
- Most recent winner: Chuck BB (2007)
- Website: www.comic-con.org/awards/eisner-awards/

The Eisner Award for Talent Deserving of Wider Recognition was an award for "creative achievement" in American comic books. It was given out every year from 1995 to 2006. In 2007 the judges changed the name of the award from "Talent Deserving of Wider Recognition" to "Special Recognition." In 2009 the judges dropped the award completely.

== Winners and nominees ==
=== Talent Deserving of Wider Recognition ===
Year	Nominee	Titles	Ref.
1990s
1995	Evan Dorkin	Milk and Cheese, Hectic Planet, Dork, Instant Piano	
1995	Paul Grist	Kane, Grendel Tales	
1995	Nina Paley	Nina's Adventures	
1995	Don Simpson	Don Simpson's Bizarre Heroes	
1995	Rumiko Takahashi	Ranma ½, Mermaid Forest	
1996	Stan Sakai	Usagi Yojimbo	
1996	Kim Deitch	Zero Zero, Waldo World, etc.	
1996	Peter Kuper	Kafka: Give it Up!, Stripped, An Unauthorized Autobiography, etc.	
1996	Jeff Nicholson	Father & Son, Through the Habitrails, etc.	
1996	Joe Sacco	Palestine	
1996	Seth	Palooka-Ville	
1997	Ricardo Delgado	Age of Reptiles	
1997	Debbie Drechsler	Daddy's Girl, Nowhere	
1997	Jon "Bean" Hastings	Smith Brown Jones	
1997	Batton Lash	Wolff & Byrd, Counselors of the Macabre	
1997	Gary Spencer Millidge	Strangehaven	
1997	Rob Walton	Ragmop	
1998	Linda Medley	Castle Waiting (Olio Press)	
1998	Bob Fingerman	Minimum Wage (Fantagraphics)	
1998	Paul Grist	Kane (Dancing Elephant Press)	
1998	Bill Morrison	Roswell, Little Green Man (Bongo Comics)	
1998	Gary Shipman and Rhoda Shipman	Pakkins' Land (Caliber Comics)	
1998	Jill Thompson	Scary Godmother (Sirius Comics)	
1999	Brian Michael Bendis	Jinx, A.K.A. Goldfish, Torso (writer/artist)	
1999	Steve Conley	Astounding Space Thrills (writer/artist)	
1999	Nat Gertler	The Factor (writer)	
1999	Lea Hernandez	Cathedral Child (writer/artist)	
1999	Scott Morse	Soulwind (writer/artist), Visitations (writer/artist), etc.	
2000s
2000	Tony Millionaire	Sock Monkey	
2000	Ellen Forney	Monkey Food	
2000	Lawrence Marvit	Sparks	
2000	Ariel Schrag	Potential	
2000	Judd Winick	The Adventures of Barry Ween, Boy Genius	
2001	Alex Robinson	Box Office Poison	
2001	J. Bone	Allison Dare (artist), Solar Stella	
2001	Mike Brennan	Electric Girl	
2001	Catherine Doherty	Can of Worms	
2001	Scott Mills	Big Clay Pot	
2001	Mark Smylie	Artesia	
2002	Dylan Horrocks	Hicksville, Atlas	
2002	Jen Benka and Kris Dresen	Manya	
2002	Nick Bertozzi	The Masochists	
2002	Arthur Dela Cruz	Kissing Chaos	
2002	Dean Haspiel	Opposable Thumbs	
2003	Jason Shiga	Fleep (Sparkplug Comics)	
2003	Richard Hahn	Lumakick (Lumakick Studio)	
2003	Myatt Murphy and Scott Dalrymple	Fade From Blue (Second 2 Some Studios)	
2003	Tyler Page	Stylish Vittles (Dementian Comics)	
2003	Justine Shaw	Nowhere Girl	
2004	Derek Kirk Kim	Same Difference and Other Stories	
2004	Chrstine Norrie	Cheat	
2004	Jeff Parker	The Interman	
2004	Ben Towele	Farewell Georgia	
2004	Brian Wood	The Couriers, Channel Zero: Jennie One	
2005	Sean McKeever	The Waiting Place, Mary Jane, Inhumans, Sentinel	
2005	Frank Cammuso	Max Hamm, Fairy Tale Detective	
2005	Bosch Fawstin	Table One	
2005	Matt Kindt	2 Sisters, Pistolwhip	
2005	Raina Telgemeier	Smile, Take-Out	
2006	Aaron Renier	Spiral-Bound	
2006	Dawn Brown	Ravenous, Little Red Hot	
2006	Zak Sally	Recidivist	
2006	Ursula Vernon	Digger	

=== Special Recognition ===
Year	Nominee	Titles	Ref.
2000s
2007	Hope Larson	Gray Horses (Oni Press)	
2007	Ross Campbell	The Abandoned (Tokyopop), Wet Moon, vol. 2 (Oni Press)	
2007	Svetlana Chmakova	Dramacon (Tokyopop)	
2007	Dash Shaw	The Mother's Mouth (Alternative Comics)	
2007	Kazimir Strzepek	Mourning Star (Bodega Distribution)	
2008	Chuck BB	Black Metal (artist) (Oni Press)	
2008	Matt Silady	The Homeless Channel (writer/artist) (AiT/PlanetLar)	
2008	Jamie Tanner	The Aviary (writer/artist) (AdHouse Books)	
2008	James Vining	First in Space (writer/artist) (Oni Press)	
