= Sean McKeever =

American comic book writer (born 1972)

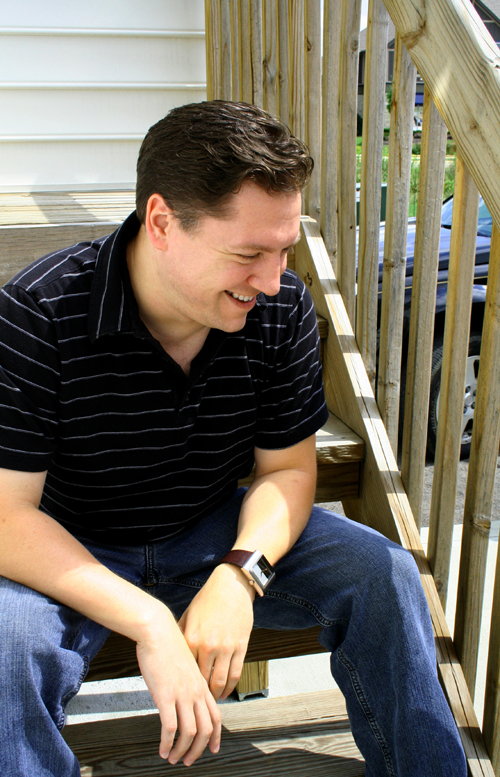
- Born: Sean Kelley McKeever; 1972 (age 53–54) Appleton, Wisconsin
- Area: Writer
- Notable works: The Waiting Place; Sentinel; Spider-Man Loves Mary Jane; Teen Titans; Star Wars: The Old Republic
- Awards: Eisner Award (2005)

Sean Kelley McKeever (born 1972) is an American comic book writer and video game writer. Born in Appleton, Wisconsin he grew up in Eagle River. He is mostly known for his creator-owned series The Waiting Place and Outpost Zero, Spider-Man Loves Mary-Jane and Sentinel for Marvel Comics and his run on Teen Titans for DC Comics. Among the video games he worked on are BioWare's Star Wars: The Old Republic and FoxNext Games' Storyscape: The X-Files.

== Career ==
After dropping out of college, Sean McKeever ran a 250-foot comic store inside his parents' hardware and sporting goods store. Being inspired by comic books like Strangers in Paradise, Stray Bullets and Hate as well as TV series like Seinfeld and ER, he created his self-published comic book series The Waiting Place. After three issues, it was picked up and republished by indie comic publisher Slave Labor Graphics, who published two volumes with 18 issues in total from 1997 to 2002.

Since the end of his creator-owned teen drama series, McKeever has written several series for Marvel Comics, including The Incredible Hulk, Sentinel, Mary Jane, Inhumans and Gravity.

In 2005, he won an Eisner Award for Talent Deserving of Wider Recognition.

He has written for the monthly comic books Gravity, Marvel Adventures Spider-Man, Sentinel and Spider-Man Loves Mary Jane, all for Marvel Comics, and on January 9, 2007, DC Comics announced that McKeever had signed an exclusive contract with the publisher. He was a part of the writing team working on DC's weekly series Countdown, and took over for Gail Simone as the writer of Birds of Prey after issue #112, however, his last issue was #117 due to time constraints with deadlines. Sean also took up writing duties on Teen Titans with the double sized August issue #50 and also wrote the Terror Titans limited series that spun off from this. His run on Teen Titans has ended with issue #71, although he has continued with a Ravager back-up story starting in #72.

It was announced at Wizard World Philadelphia 2009 that McKeever, no longer under exclusive contract to DC, would write the limited series Nomad: Girl Without a World for Marvel Comics. This led into Young Allies, a new series and team formed after the Heroic Age line-wide reboot, all with artist David Baldeon.

In 2009, McKeever wrote a new story for The Waiting Place illustrated by Mike Norton. The story was printed in The Waiting Place: The Definitive Edition from IDW Publishing.

In 2011, with Marvel cancelling several titles and placing a moratorium on new series, and DC launching The New 52, McKeever found himself suddenly out of comic book work. He applied for a game writing position at BioWare and after being accepted, he moved to Austin, TX, to work full-time on the MMORPG Star Wars: The Old Republic. After his time at BioWare, he wrote for other video games, including a The X-Files narrative mobile game, published by FoxNext Games.

He returned to comic book writing with his creator-owned series Outpost Zero (Skybound/Image Comics) in 2018. From 2022 to 2023 he wrote story arcs for Marvel's digital comic series Love Unlimited and Avengers Unlimited. In 2023, he contributed a story to Blood Hunters #3 for Marvel. In 2024, McKeever worked as narrative director on a mobile game from Scopely.

== Bibliography ==
=== Comics ===
==== Self-published ====
- Counter (24-hour comic) (also artist) (2004)
- Looking at the Front Door (2002)
- The Meredith Club (2004)

==== Anarchy ====
- Vampi: Vicious #1–3 (2003)

==== Caliber ====
- Negative Burn #30, 38, 44 (1996–1997)

==== Dark Horse ====
- Sackboy: A Big Adventure - The Gathering Storm (digital motion comic) (2020)

==== DC Comics ====
- Birds of Prey #113–117 (2007–2008)
- Countdown Presents: The Search for Ray Palmer: Crime Society #1 (2007)
- Countdown to Final Crisis #47, 42, 39, 35, 31, 27, 18, 4, 3 & 2 (2007–2008)
- Teen Titans #50–71, #72–80 (Ravager co-feature), Annual 2009 #1 (2007–2010)
- Terror Titans #1–6 (limited series) (2008–2009)
- Titans #11–13 (2009)

==== Devil's Due ====
- G.I. Joe: Frontline #9–10 (2003)
- Lloyd Kaufman Presents: The Toxic Avenger and Other Tromatic Tales #1 (OGN anthology) (2007)

==== IDW ====
- The Waiting Place: The Definitive Edition SC (new story) (2009)

==== Image Comics ====
- Outpost Zero #1–14 (2018–2019)

==== Marvel Comics ====
- Age of Heroes #2 (2010)
- Amazing Fantasy vol. 2 #15 (2006)
- Avengers Origins: Scarlet Witch & Quicksilver #1 (2012)
- Avengers Unlimited #55–57 (digital) (2023)
- Blood Hunters #3 (2024)
- Captain America #602–615 (Nomad backup stories) (2010–2011)
- Elektra: The Official Movie Adaptation (2005)
- Fear Itself: Youth in Revolt #1–6 (2011)
- Firestar #1 (2010)
- Gravity #1–5 (limited series) (2005)
- I Am an Avenger #2–3 (Firestar/Justice) (2010)
- Incredible Hulk #26, 30–32 (2001)
- Inhumans vol. 6 #1–12 (2003–2004)
- Love Unlimited #19–24, 55–60 (digital) (2022–2023)
- Marvel Age Fantastic Four #1–4 (2004)
- Marvel Double Shot #3 (Ant Man/Giant Man) (2003)
- Marvel Adventures Spider-Man #5–12 (2005–2006)
- Mary Jane #1–4 (limited series) (2004)
- Mary Jane: Homecoming #1–4 (limited series) (2005)
- Mega Morphs toy insert mini-comics (6 total) (2005)
- Mega Morphs #1–4 (limited series) (2005)
- Mystique #14–24 (2004–2005)
- Nomad: Girl Without a World #1–4 (limited series) (2009)
- Onslaught Unleashed #1–4 (2011)
- Sentinel #1–12 (2003–2004)
- Sentinel vol. 2 #1–5 (limited series) (2006)
- Siege: Young Avengers #1 (2010)
- Spider-Girl #51 (2002)
- Spider-Man Family #1–2 (2007)
- Spider-Man Family Featuring Spider-Man's Amazing Friends #1 (2006)
- Spider-Man Loves Mary Jane #1–20 (2005–2007)
- Ultimate X-Men #75 (backup story) (2006)
- Web of Spider-Man vol. 2 #1 (2009)
- What If? Spider-Man: House of M #1 (2009)
- Young Allies #1–6 (2010–2011)
- X-Men Origins: Jean Grey #1 (2008)

==== Sirius ====
- Tower oneshot (2002)

==== SLG ====
- The Waiting Place #1–6 (1997)
- The Waiting Place vol. 2 #1–12 (1999–2002)

=== Collected editions ===
==== About Comics ====
- 24 Hour Comics All-Stars (Softcover) (ISBN 0-9753958-4-X)

==== DC Comics ====
- Birds of Prey: Metropolis or Dust (Softcover) (ISBN 978-1-4012-1962-8)
- Countdown to Final Crisis vol. 1 (Softcover) (ISBN 978-1-4012-1789-1); vol. 2 (Softcover) (ISBN 978-1-4012-1824-9); vol. 3 (Softcover) (ISBN 978-1-4012-1911-6); vol. 4 (Softcover) (ISBN 978-1-4012-1912-3)
- Countdown Presents: The Search for Ray Palmer (Softcover) (ISBN 978-1-4012-1798-3)
- Teen Titans vol. 8: Titans of Tomorrow (Softcover) (ISBN 978-1-4012-1807-2)
- Teen Titans vol. 9: On the Clock (Softcover) (ISBN 978-1-4012-1971-0)
- Teen Titans vol. 10: Changing of the Guard (Softcover) (ISBN 978-1-4012-2309-0)
- Teen Titans vol. 11: Deathtrap (Softcover) (ISBN 978-1-4012-2509-4)
- Terror Titans (Softcover) (ISBN 978-1-4012-2294-9)
- Titans vol. 2: Lockdown (Softcover) (ISBN 978-1-4012-2476-9)

==== Devil's Due ====
- G.I. Joe: Frontline vol 4 - One-Shots (Softcover) (ISBN 1-932796-21-5)
- Lloyd Kaufman Presents: The Toxic Avenger And Other Tromatic Tales (Softcover) (ISBN 978-1-932796-90-2)

==== IDW Publishing ====
- The Waiting Place: The Definitive Edition (Softcover) (ISBN 978-1-60010-526-5)

==== Marvel Comics ====
- Elektra: The Official Movie Adaptation (Softcover) (ISBN 0-7851-1713-X)
- Gravity: Big-City Super Hero (Digest) (ISBN 0-7851-1798-9)
- Inhumans vol 1: Culture Shock (Digest) (ISBN 0-7851-1755-5)
- Marvel Age Fantastic Four vol 1: All For One (Digest) (ISBN 0-7851-1468-8)
- Marvel Adventures Spider-Man vol 1 (Hardcover) (ISBN 978-0-7851-2432-0)
- Marvel Adventures Spider-Man vol 2: Power Struggle (Digest) (ISBN 0-7851-1903-5)
- Marvel Adventures Spider-Man vol 3: Doom With a View (Digest) (ISBN 978-0-7851-2000-1)
- Mary Jane vol 1: Circle of Friends (Digest) (ISBN 0-7851-1467-X)
- Mary Jane vol 2: Homecoming (Digest) (ISBN 0-7851-1779-2)
- Mega Morphs (Digest) (ISBN 0-7851-1868-3)
- Mini Marvels: Secret Invasion (Digest) (ISBN 978-0-7851-3717-7)
- Mystique vol. 3: Unnatural (Softcover) (ISBN 0-7851-1556-0)
- Mystique vol. 4: Quiet (Softcover) (ISBN 0-7851-1475-0)
- Sensational Spider-Man: Back in Black (Hardcover) (ISBN 978-0-7851-2920-2); (Softcover) (ISBN 978-0-7851-2997-4)
- Sentinel vol 1: Salvage (Digest) (ISBN 0-7851-1380-0)
- Sentinel vol 2: No Hero (Digest) (ISBN 0-7851-1368-1)
- Sentinel vol 3: Past Imperfect (Digest) (ISBN 0-7851-1914-0)
- Spider-Man Family vol. 1: Back in Black (Digest) (ISBN 978-0-7851-2626-3)
- Spider-Man Loves Mary Jane vol 1 (Hardcover) (ISBN 978-0-7851-2610-2)
- Spider-Man Loves Mary Jane vol 2 (Hardcover) (ISBN 978-0-7851-3083-3)
- Spider-Man Loves Mary Jane vol 1: Super Crush (Digest) (ISBN 978-0-7851-1954-8)
- Spider-Man Loves Mary Jane vol 2: The New Girl (Digest) (ISBN 978-0-7851-2265-4)
- Spider-Man Loves Mary Jane vol 3: My Secret Life (Digest) (ISBN 978-0-7851-2266-1)
- Spider-Man Loves Mary Jane vol 4: Still Friends (Digest) (ISBN 978-0-7851-2564-8)
- Spider-Man: Amazing Friends (Digest) (ISBN 978-0-7851-3764-1)
- Ultimate X-Men vol. 8 (Hardcover) (ISBN 978-0-7851-3080-2)
- Ultimate X-Men vol. 16: Cable (Softcover) (ISBN 978-0-7851-2548-8)
- X-Men Origins (Hardcover) (ISBN 978-0-7851-3451-0)
- Young Inhumans (Softcover) (ISBN 978-0-7851-3382-7)

==== SLG ====
- The Waiting Place Book One (Softcover) (ISBN 0-943151-36-8)
- The Waiting Place Book Two (Softcover) (ISBN 0-943151-53-8)
- The Waiting Place Book Three (Softcover) (ISBN 0-943151-76-7)

=== Comic strips ===
- Crankshaft 5/15/2006–5/20/2006 (uncredited writer)
- Funky Winkerbean 4/10/2006–4/15/2006; 4/17/2006–4/22/2006; 5/22/2006–5/27/2006; 5/29/2006–6/3/2006; 6/19/2006–6/24/2006; plus an additional 10 weeks, Monday-Saturday (uncredited writer)

=== Trading Cards ===
==== Upper Deck Company ====
- Avengers: Kree-Skrull War (main story: 90 cards, side stories: 99 cards) (2011)

== Filmography ==
=== Television ===
- Iron Man: Armored Adventures Episode 2.24 (2012)

== Gameography ==
=== BioWare ===
- Star Wars: The Old Republic: Rise of the Hutt Cartel (2013)
- Star Wars: The Old Republic: Galactic Starfighter (2014)
- Star Wars: The Old Republic: Galactic Strongholds (2014)
- Star Wars: The Old Republic: Shadow of Revan (2014)
- Star Wars: The Old Republic: Knights of the Fallen Empire (2015)

=== FoxNext Games ===
- Storyscape: The X-Files - Season 1 (2019)

== Characters created ==
=== Marvel ===
- Alaris (with Matt Clark) first appeared in Inhumans vol. 6 #1
- Aftershock (with Casey Jones) first appeared in Spider-Girl #51
- Andy Anderson (with Patrick Scherberger) first appeared in Marvel Adventures Spider-Man #7
- Black Death (with Mike Norton) first appeared in Gravity #1
- Brushfire (with Mike Norton) first appeared in Gravity #5
- Helena Carlson (with Manuel Garcia) first appeared in Mystique #14
- Gravity/Greg Willis (with Mike Norton) first appeared in Gravity #1
- Intello (with Mike Norton) first appeared in Marvel Adventures Spider-Man #11
- Jolen (with Matt Clark) first appeared in Inhumans vol. 6 #1
- Positron (with Kristian Donaldson) first appeared in Amazing Fantasy vol. 2 #15
- San (with Matt Clark) first appeared in Inhumans vol. 6 #2
- Juston Seyfert (with UDON) first appeared in Sentinel #1
- Lauren Singh (with Mike Norton) first appeared in Gravity #1

== Notes ==
Preceded by Tony Bedard	Birds of Prey writer 2008	Succeeded by Tony Bedard
Preceded by Ron Garney & Jerry Ordway	Incredible Hulk writer 2001 (with Paul Jenkins)	Succeeded by Bruce Jones
Preceded by Adam Beechen	Teen Titans writer 2007–2009	Succeeded by Bryan Q. Miller
