= Salinas High School =

Location
- 726 South Main Street; Salinas, California; United States; 36.66718°N 121.65691°W

Information
- Type: Public secondary
- Established: 1882; 144 years ago
- School district: Salinas Union High School District
- CEEB code: 52755
- Principal: Margarita Contreras
- Teaching staff: 108.92 (FTE)
- Grades: 9-12
- Enrollment: 2,446 (2023-2024)
- Student to teacher ratio: 22.46
- Campus type: Rural / suburban
- Colors: Purple and gold
- Nickname: Cowboys
- Website: shs.salinasuhsd.org

Salinas High School (SHS) is a public 9–12 high school in Salinas, California, United States. It is the first of five primary high schools of the Salinas Union High School District.

== History ==
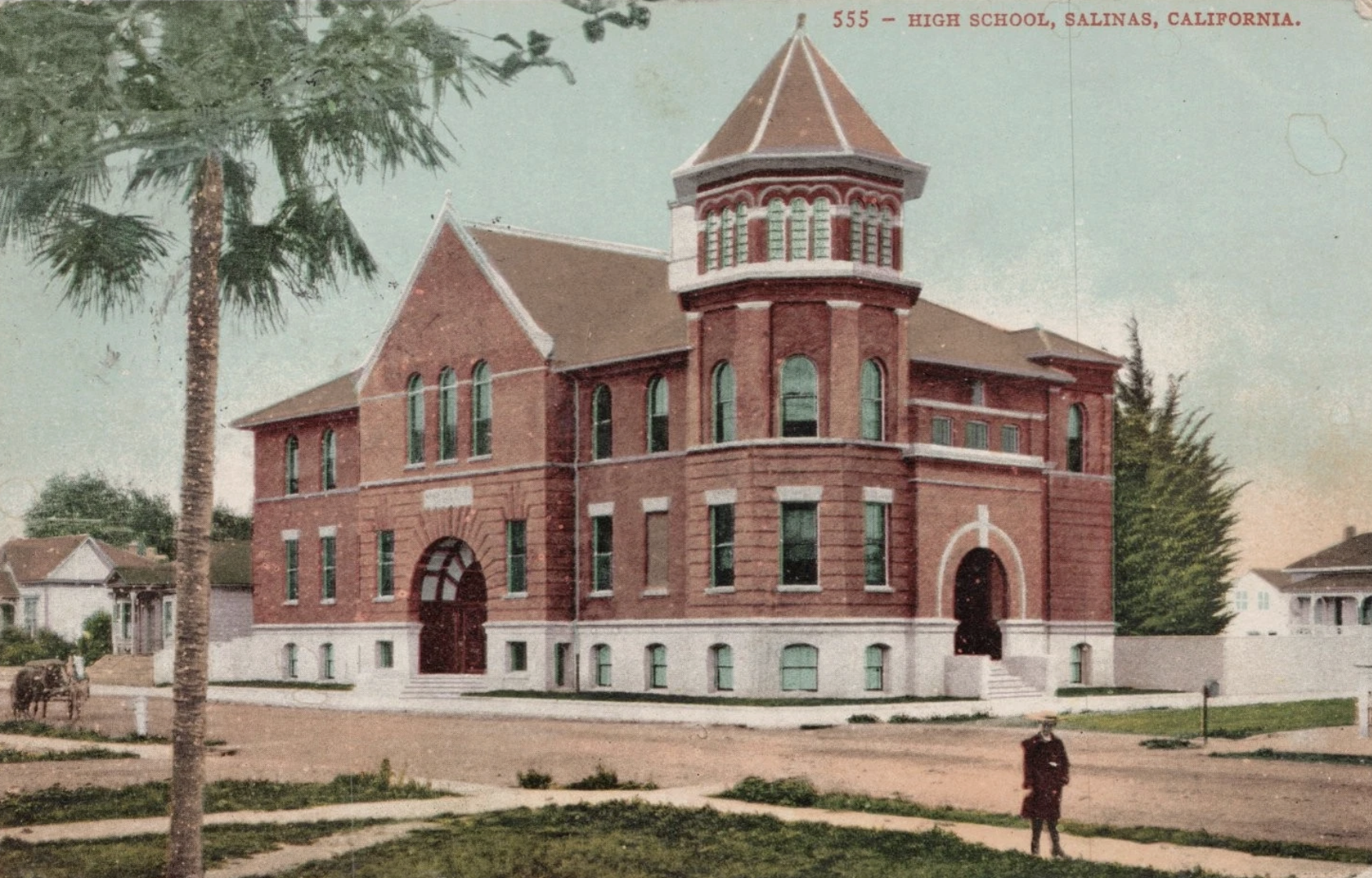
Salinas High School, c. 1908

Salinas High School was founded in 1882, and moved to its current campus location on 726 S Main Street in 1920. The 1989 Loma Prieta earthquake damaged many buildings on campus and required much of the classes to relocate to portable classrooms. The campus was rebuilt circa 1999. While most buildings were demolished and replaced, the original main wing and bell tower were retained and renovated.

During the August 2021 football jamboree, students made an Instagram account "shaniqua.shs" that posted pictures and videos of a defaced black baby doll. Posts showed white and latino students posing with it and stomping on the doll, with comments using the n-word. The actions were called racist and disturbing by Monterey Weekly. As a result, three students were suspended and one student removed from the cheer team.

In March of 2026, the school finished construction on and opened a new building that houses a new main office, biology classrooms, and about a dozen new classrooms.

== About ==
The administrative team includes principal Dr. Margarita Contreras, with assistants Angela Perez, Katie Zelensky, Laura Hammersmith, and Anthony Morales. As of the 2019–2020 school year the school enrolled 2700 students. Its campus is situated in a rural and suburban setting. The Salinas Cowboys compete in the Pacific Coast Athletic League of the CIF Central Coast Section. The school colors are purple and gold.

== Notable alumni ==
- Lester D. Boronda (1886–1953), painter, furniture designer, sculptor
- Noah Harpster, actor, writer, director, producer
- Nyziah Hunter (born 2004), college football wide receiver
- Ryan Jensen (born 1997) pitcher for MLB's Minnesota Twins organization
- Xavier Nady (born 1978) Professional outfielder and first baseman for San Diego Padres and seven other MLB teams, to include San Francisco Giants and New York Yankees
- Joe Kapp (1938–2023) quarterback, played in Canadian Football League (CFL) and in NFL with Minnesota Vikings and Boston Patriots; coached Cal football
- Rick Law (born 1969), Disney artist and producer
- Emily Uribe (born 2000), Content Creator, Actress, and Entrepreneur
- Nathan Martorella (born 2001) professional baseball player
- Van Partible (born 1971), creator of Johnny Bravo
- Gary Shipman (born 1966), comic book artist and creator of Pakkins' Land
- Brendon Small (born 1975), founder of Dethklok
- Evan Smith (born 1986) former center for NFL's Tampa Bay Buccaneers
- Cristian Soratos (born 1992) professional runner
- Edward Soriano (born 1946), retired United States Army Lieutenant General
- John Steinbeck (1902–1968) novelist of The Grapes of Wrath (1939) and East of Eden (1952) and novella Of Mice and Men (1937) and former SHS class president
- Miles Teves (born 1963) artist and conceptual designer on television productions, films, and computer games
