= Meteor Man =

Meteor Man may refer to:

- The Meteor Man (film), a 1993 film about a superhero, starring Robert Townsend
  - Meteor Man (comic), a 1993 Marvel Comics limited series based on the film
- Looter (character), a Marvel Comics supervillain also known as Meteor Man
- Meteor Man, a character in the animated series Birdman and the Galaxy Trio
- "Meteor Man", a song by Dee D. Jackson
