= List of Marvel Digests =

This is a list of titles by comic book publisher Marvel Comics that are collected in the smaller digest sized format, rather than the standard American comic book size format that they were (at most) originally published in.

== List ==
Title	ISBN	Release date	Material collected
Araña, Vol. 1: Heart of the Spider	0785115064	January 12, 2005	Amazing Fantasy vol. 2, #1–6
Araña, Vol. 2: In the Beginning	0785117199	August 24, 2005	Araña: Heart of the Spider #1–6
Araña, Vol. 3: Night of the Hunter	0785118535	February 22, 2006	Araña: Heart of the Spider #7–12
Avengers and Power Pack Assemble!	0785121552	November 15, 2006	Avengers and Power Pack Assemble! #1–4
Emma Frost, Vol. 1: Higher Learning	0785114343	August 4, 2004	Emma Frost #1–6
Emma Frost, Vol. 2: Mind Games	0785114130	January 19, 2005	Emma Frost #7–12
Emma Frost, Vol. 3: Bloom	0785114734	May 25, 2005	Emma Frost #13–18
Fantastic Four Presents Franklin Richards: Son of a Genius, Vol. 1: Lab Brat	0785123229	February 14, 2007	Franklin Richards: Son of a Genius; Everybody Loves Franklin; Super Summer Spectacular; Happy Franksgiving; Masked Marvel #1–2
Gravity: Big-City Super Hero	0785117989	December 14, 2005	Gravity #1–5
Hulk and Power Pack: Pack Smash!	078512490X	August 29, 2007	Hulk and Power Pack #1–4
Human Torch, Vol. 1: Burn	0785117571	May 5, 2005	Human Torch vol. 2, #1–6
Inhumans, Vol. 1: Culture Shock	0785117555	March 9, 2005	Inhumans vol. 4, #1–6
Irredeemable Ant-Man, Vol. 1: Low-Life	0785119620	June 27, 2007	Irredeemable Ant-Man #1–6
Irredeemable Ant-Man, Vol. 2: Small Minded!	0785119639	December 12, 2007	Irredeemable Ant-Man #7–12
Livewires: Clockwork Thugs, Yo	0785115196	October 12, 2005	Livewires #1–6
Machine Teen: History 101001	0785117997	November 16, 2005	Machine Teen #1–5
Marvel Adventures Avengers, Vol. 1: Heroes Assembled	0785123067	October 18, 2006	Marvel Adventures Avengers #1–4
Marvel Adventures Avengers, Vol. 2: Mischief	0785123075	March 28, 2007	Marvel Adventures Avengers #5–8
Marvel Adventures Avengers, Vol. 3: Bizarre Adventures	0785123083	July 18, 2007	Marvel Adventures Avengers #9–12
Marvel Adventures Avengers, Vol. 4: The Dream Team	0785125299	December 12, 2007	Marvel Adventures Avengers #13–16
Marvel Adventures Avengers, Vol. 5: Some Assembling Required	0785125302	May 14, 2008	Marvel Adventures Avengers #17–20
Marvel Adventures Avengers, Vol. 6: Mighty Marvels	0785129820	July 16, 2008	Marvel Adventures Avengers #21–24
Marvel Adventures Avengers, Vol. 7: Weirder and Wilder	0785129839	November 12, 2008	Marvel Adventures Avengers #25–28
Marvel Adventures Fantastic Four, Vol. 1: Family of Heroes	0785118586	December 21, 2005	Marvel Adventures Fantastic Four #1–4
Marvel Adventures Fantastic Four, Vol. 2: Fantastic Voyages	0785118594	April 5, 2006	Marvel Adventures Fantastic Four #5–8
Marvel Adventures Fantastic Four, Vol. 3: World's Greatest	0785120025	August 9, 2006	Marvel Adventures Fantastic Four #9–12
Marvel Adventures Fantastic Four, Vol. 4: Cosmic Threats	0785122087	November 29, 2006	Marvel Adventures Fantastic Four #13–16
Marvel Adventures Fantastic Four, Vol. 5: All 4 One, 4 for All	0785122095	May 9, 2007	Marvel Adventures Fantastic Four #17–20
Marvel Adventures Fantastic Four, Vol. 6: Monsters and Mysteries	0785123806	September 5, 2007	Marvel Adventures Fantastic Four #21–24
Marvel Adventures Fantastic Four, Vol. 7: The Silver Surfer	0785124853	January 9, 2008	Marvel Adventures Fantastic Four #25–28
Marvel Adventures Fantastic Four, Vol. 8: Monsters, Moles, Cowboys, and Coupons	0785124861	June 18, 2008	Marvel Adventures Fantastic Four #29–32
Marvel Adventures Fantastic Four, Vol. 9: New York's Finest	0785129855	August 20, 2008	Marvel Adventures Fantastic Four #33–36
Marvel Adventures Hulk, Vol. 1: Misunderstood Monster	0785126422	January 2, 2008	Marvel Adventures Hulk #1–4
Marvel Adventures Hulk, Vol. 2: Defenders	0785126430	May 7, 2008	Marvel Adventures Hulk #5–8
Marvel Adventures Hulk, Vol. 3: Strongest One There Is	0785129804	September 10, 2008	Marvel Adventures Hulk #9–12
Marvel Adventures Iron Man, Vol. 1: Heart of Steel	0785126449	March 5, 2008	Marvel Adventures Iron Man #1–4
Marvel Adventures Iron Man, Vol. 2: Iron Armory	0785126457	March 5, 2008	Marvel Adventures Iron Man #5–8
Marvel Adventures Iron Man, Vol. 3: Hero by Design	078513008X	September 24, 2008	Marvel Adventures Iron Man #9–12
Marvel Adventures Iron Man, Vol. 4: Armored Avenger	0785134212	December 24, 2008	Marvel Adventures Iron Man #13–16
Marvel Adventures Spider-Man, Vol. 1: The Sinister Six	0785117393	August 3, 2005	Marvel Adventures Spider-Man #1–4
Marvel Adventures Spider-Man, Vol. 2: Power Struggle	0785119035	December 28, 2005	Marvel Adventures Spider-Man #5–8
Marvel Adventures Spider-Man, Vol. 3: Doom with a View	0785120009	June 21, 2006	Marvel Adventures Spider-Man #9–12
Marvel Adventures Spider-Man, Vol. 4: Concrete Jungle	078512005X	September 13, 2006	Marvel Adventures Spider-Man #13–16
Marvel Adventures Spider-Man, Vol. 5: Monsters on the Prowl	0785123091	February 14, 2007	Marvel Adventures Spider-Man #17–20
Marvel Adventures Spider-Man, Vol. 6: The Black Costume	0785123105	June 6, 2007	Marvel Adventures Spider-Man #21–24
Marvel Adventures Spider-Man, Vol. 7: Secret Identity	0785123857	September 1, 2007	Marvel Adventures Spider-Man #25–28
Marvel Adventures Spider-Man, Vol. 8: Forces of Nature	0785125256	January 30, 2008	Marvel Adventures Spider-Man #29–32
Marvel Adventures Spider-Man, Vol. 9: Fiercest Foes	0785125264	May 7, 2008	Marvel Adventures Spider-Man #33–36
Marvel Adventures Spider-Man, Vol. 10: Identity Crisis	0785128697	October 1, 2008	Marvel Adventures Spider-Man #37–40
Marvel Adventures Spider-Man, Vol. 11: Animal Instinct	0785128700	December 5, 2008	Marvel Adventures Spider-Man #41–44
Marvel Adventures Spider-Man, Vol. 12: Jumping to Conclusions	978-0785128717	May 29, 2009	Marvel Adventures Spider-Man #45–48
Marvel Adventures Spider-Man, Vol. 13: Animal Attack!	978-0785136392	August 12, 2009	Marvel Adventures Spider-Man #49–52
Marvel Adventures Spider-Man, Vol. 14: Thwip!	0785136401	December 9, 2009	Marvel Adventures Spider-Man #53–56
Marvel Age Fantastic Four, Vol. 1: All for One	0785114688	July 7, 2004	Marvel Age Fantastic Four #1–4
Marvel Age Fantastic Four, Vol. 2: Doom	0785115501	November 17, 2004	Marvel Age Fantastic Four #5–8
Marvel Age Fantastic Four, Vol. 3: The Return of Doom	0785116222	February 9, 2005	Marvel Age Fantastic Four #9–12
Marvel Age Fantastic Four Tales	0785117385	June 1, 2005	Marvel Age Fantastic Four Tales #1; Tales of the Thing #1–3; Spider-Man Team-Up Special
Marvel Age Hulk, Vol. 1: Incredible	0785116168	January 26, 2005	Marvel Age Hulk #1–4
Marvel Age Spider-Man, Vol. 1: Fearsome Foes	0785114394	April 14, 2004	Marvel Age Spider-Man #1–4
Marvel Age Spider-Man, Vol. 2: Everyday Hero	0785114513	July 7, 2004	Marvel Age Spider-Man #5–8
Marvel Age Spider-Man, Vol. 3: Swingtime	078511548X	July 7, 2004	Marvel Age Spider-Man #9–12
Marvel Age Spider-Man, Vol. 4: The Goblin Strikes	0785115498	November 3, 2004	Marvel Age Spider-Man #13–16
Marvel Age Spider-Man, Vol. 5: Spidey Strikes Back	078511632X	March 16, 2005	Marvel Age Spider-Man #17–20
Marvel Age Spider-Man/Doctor Octopus: Out of Reach	0785113606	June 3, 2004	Spider-Man/Doctor Octopus: Out of Reach #1–5
Marvel Age Spider-Man Team-Up, Vol. 1: A Little Help From My Friends	0785116117	January 12, 2005	Marvel Age Spider-Man Team-Up #1–4
Marvel Holiday	0785123008	November 22, 2006	Marvel Holiday Special 2004–2005; Marvel Team-Up #1 (partially); Uncanny X-Men #143 (partially)
Marvel Nemesis: The Imperfects	0785117784	November 2, 2005	Marvel Nemesis: The Imperfects #1–6
Mary Jane, Vol. 1: Circle of Friends	078511467X	November 3, 2004	Mary Jane #1–4
Mary Jane, Vol. 2: Homecoming	0785117792	October 5, 2005	Mary Jane: Homecoming #1–4
Mega Morphs	0785118683	December 7, 2005	Mega Morphs #1–4 (six toy insert comics)
Mini Marvels: Rock, Paper, Scissors	0785132112	August 20, 2008	Marvel original digest
Mini Marvels: Secret Invasion	978-0785137177	February 4, 2009	Marvel original digest
Ororo: Before the Storm	0785118195	October 30, 2005	Ororo: Before the Storm #1–4
Power Pack: Pack Attack!	0785117369	August 17, 2005	Power Pack vol. 3, #1–4
Runaways, Vol. 1: Pride and Joy	0785113797	April 14, 2004	Runaways #1–6
Runaways, Vol. 2: Teenage Wasteland	0785114157	September 15, 2004	Runaways #7–12
Runaways, Vol. 3: The Good Die Young	0785116842	February 2, 2005	Runaways #13–18
Runaways, Vol. 4: True Believers	0785117059	September 28, 2005	Runaways vol. 2, #1–6
Runaways, Vol. 5: Escape to New York	0785119019	March 22, 2006	Runaways vol. 2, #7–12
Runaways, Vol. 6: Parental Guidance	0785119523	October 25, 2006	Runaways vol. 2, #13–18
Runaways, Vol. 7: Live Fast	0785122672	April 25, 2007	Runaways vol. 2, #19–24
Scorpion: Poison Tomorrow	0785117121	November 9, 2005	Amazing Fantasy vol. 2, #7–12
Sentinel, Vol. 1: Salvage	0785113800	April 14, 2004	Sentinel #1–6
Sentinel, Vol. 2: No Hero	0785113681	October 13, 2004	Sentinel #7–12
Sentinel, Vol. 3: Past Imperfect	0785119140	May 31, 2006	Sentinel vol. 2, #1–5
Spellbinders: Signs and Wonders	0785117563	October 12, 2005	Spellbinders #1–6
Spider-Girl, Vol. 1: Legacy	0785114416	April 14, 2004	Spider-Girl #0–5
Spider-Girl, Vol. 2: Like Father Like Daughter	0785116575	November 17, 2004	Spider-Girl #6–11
Spider-Girl, Vol. 3: Avenging Allies	0785116583	March 23, 2005	Spider-Girl #12–16, Annual 1999
Spider-Girl, Vol. 4: Turning Point	0785118713	September 7, 2005	Spider-Girl #17–21, #½
Spider-Girl, Vol. 5: Endgame	0785120343	January 18, 2006	Spider-Girl #22–27
Spider-Girl, Vol. 6: Too Many Spiders!	0785121560	June 7, 2006	Spider-Girl #28–33
Spider-Girl, Vol. 7: Duty Calls	0785121579	November 1, 2006	Spider-Girl #34–38
Spider-Girl Presents A-Next, Vol. 1: Second Coming	0785121315	August 9, 2006	A-Next #1–6
Spider-Girl Presents Fantastic Five: In Search of Doom	0785121323	September 6, 2006	Fantastic Five #1–5
Spider-Girl Presents J2, Vol. 1: Secrets and Lies	0785120475	March 15, 2006	J2 #1–6
Spider-Man/Human Torch: I'm With Stupid	0785117237	July 27, 2005	Spider-Man/Human Torch #1–5
Spider-Man Loves Mary Jane, Vol. 1: Super Crush	078511954X	July 12, 2006	Spider-Man Loves Mary Jane #1–5
Spider-Man Loves Mary Jane, Vol. 2: The New Girl	0785122656	January 10, 2007	Spider-Man Loves Mary Jane #6–10
Spider-Man Loves Mary Jane, Vol. 3: My Secret Life	0785122664	May 23, 2007	Spider-Man Loves Mary Jane #11–15
Spider-Man Loves Mary Jane, Vol. 4: Still Friends	0785125647	October 3, 2007	Spider-Man Loves Mary Jane #16–20
Spider-Man and Power Pack: Big-City Super Heroes	0785123571	May 9, 2007	Spider-Man and Power Pack #1–4
Thor: Son of Asgard, Vol. 1: The Warriors	0785113355	October 20, 2004	Thor: Son of Asgard #1–6
Thor: Son of Asgard, Vol. 2: Worthy	0785115722	April 13, 2005	Thor: Son of Asgard #7–12
X-Men and Power Pack: The Power of X	0785119558	April 19, 2006	X-Men and Power Pack #1–4
X-Men: Evolution, Vol. 1	0785113592	November 30, 1999	X-Men: Evolution #1–4
X-Men: Firestar	0785122001	May 17, 2006	Firestar #1–4
