= Ryan Jensen =

Ryan Jensen may refer to:

- Ryan Jensen (fighter) (born 1977), mixed martial artist
- Ryan Jensen (baseball, born 1975), baseball pitcher
- Ryan Jensen (baseball, born 1997), baseball pitcher
- Ryan Jensen (American football) (born 1991), football player
