= Wave motion gun (disambiguation) =

Wave motion gun is a fictional superweapon from the Space Battleship Yamato anime series.

It may also refer to:

- "Wave Motion Gun", a song by Marcy Playground from their 1999 album Shapeshifter
- Wave-Motion gun, a weapon of fictional comic character Looter
