= Holden Radcliffe =

Fictional character published by Marvel Comics

- Holden Radcliffe as seen in Machine Teen #5.

Publication information
- Publisher: Marvel Comics
- First appearance: Machine Teen #1 (July 2005)
- Created by: Marc Sumerak (writer); Mike Hawthorne (artist)

In-story information
- Alter ego: Holden Radcliffe
- Team affiliations: Holden Radcliffe Corporation

Holden Radcliffe is a fictional character appearing in American comic books published by Marvel Comics. The character is an enemy of Machine Teen.

The character made his live action debut in the Marvel Cinematic Universe series Agents of S.H.I.E.L.D. played by John Hannah.

== Publication history ==
The character, created by Marc Sumerak and Mike Hawthorne, first appeared in Machine Teen #1 (July 2005).

== Fictional character biography ==
Holden Radcliffe is a businessman, scientist, and CEO of the Holden Radcliffe Corporation who is interested in developing androids as soldiers. Radcliffe forces Dr. Aaron Isaacs on the run after he destroys his work.

After years of searching for Isaacs, who had created the robot son Adam, Radcliffe kidnaps Isaacs along with Adam and his friends. Radcliffe tortures Adam in an effort to brainwash and take control of him, but this is a ruse and Radcliffe is killed after Adam self-destructs.

== In other media ==
Holden Radcliffe appears in Agents of S.H.I.E.L.D., portrayed by John Hannah. This version is a scientist who was forced to work for Hive before being rescued by S.H.I.E.L.D. In the fourth season, Radcliffe turns on S.H.I.E.L.D. after being corrupted by the Darkhold and creates the Framework, a virtual reality. AIDA, Radcliffe's AI assistant, kills him after realizing that he is a potential danger to the Framework, but preserves his consciousness inside the Framework. In the episode "World's End", Radcliffe is killed when AIDA destroys the Framework.
