= Marvel Next =

Marvel Comics imprint

Marvel Next logo

Marvel Next was a short lived imprint that was launched by the American comics publisher Marvel Comics in early 2005. Marvel's press release stated that Marvel Next was "not a new line or imprint" but rather "a collection of titles" intended to "spotlight young characters". Like the Tsunami imprint before it, it aimed to attract young readers. Marvel Next titles carried a "Marvel Next" tag on the cover, but not always in the typical imprint location near the regular Marvel logo. The title may have been an attempt to appeal to or identify with Generation Next.

The titles were set in the Marvel Universe and most of them (Araña: The Heart of the Spider, Young Avengers, Runaways and Amazing Fantasy) had connections to pre-existing titles, taking advantage of settings, characters and events from previous stories.

== Logo use ==
While the Marvel Next press release included Young Avengers and Runaways among the forthcoming Marvel Next books, neither series ever carried the Marvel Next logo. Of the series that did carry it, only X-23 and Araña Heart of the Spider displayed it for their entire runs. The logo was used from March 2005 through February 2006, exactly matching the run of Araña, imprint's longest lasting series.

== Marvel Next titles ==
=== Ongoing (with logo on at least some issues) ===
- Araña: The Heart of the Spider
- Amazing Fantasy

=== Ongoing (press release mention only) ===
- Runaways
- Young Avengers

=== Miniseries (with logo on at least some issues) ===
- Gravity
- Livewires
- Machine Teen
- Spellbinders
- X-23

== See also ==
- List of Marvel Digests
