= The Waiting Place =

Comic book series by Sean Kelley McKeever

Publication information
- Publisher: Slave Labor Graphics
- Publication date: 1997 – 2002
- No. of issues: 18

Creative team
- Created by: Sean Kelley McKeever
- Written by: Sean Kelley McKeever
- Artist(s): Brendon & Brian Fraim (vol. 1); Mike Norton (vol. 2)

Collected editions
- Book One: ISBN 0-943151-36-8

The Waiting Place is a comic book series created by Sean Kelley McKeever in 1997. Recommended by the author for young adults aged 14+, the series is a teen drama which centers on the lives of a group of teenagers (and one twenty-something) living in the remote American town of Northern Plains. The theme of the series is that characters who live in such towns exist in a 'holding pattern', spending their time waiting for something to happen. McKeever has described the themes of some of his comics, including The Waiting Place, as being "Alienation; coming of age; a burning desire to get on with life." The Waiting Place established McKeever as a writer of high-school stories, and paved the way for his later work for Marvel Comics on titles like Sentinel and Mary Jane.

Northern Plains, where The Waiting Place is set, is based on Eagle River, Wisconsin, where Sean attended High School.

== Publication history ==
The Waiting Place started life as a self-produced comic. McKeever realized that his best chance of breaking into the comics industry was to have a complete comic to show publishers, rather than his writing on its own. He found Brendon and Brian Fraim, and together they produced the first issue of The Waiting Place. At San Diego Comic-Con in 1996, McKeever submitted a copy of #1 to Slave Labor Graphics, who liked it and took it on.

Marvel editor, Tom Brevoort, was a fan of The Waiting Place and gave McKeever his first Marvel assignments on the strength of it.

In 2005, Venture Management optioned The Waiting Place, believing it to have the potential to become a TV series.

== Characters ==
- Jeffry Dietz - the main character, who moves with his parents from the suburbs, leaving behind his girlfriend Michelle.
- Lora Halstead - a brunette senior, she believes in free love and heavy drinking.
- Jill Patterson - a blonde, beautiful freshman, who feels the need to dress in a sexy, feminine style in order to belong.
- Kyle Donovan - a long-haired juvenile delinquent who uses drugs.
- Scott Forbes - a 24-year-old who works in his father's video store and still carries a torch for his high school girlfriend, Ami.
- Ami Briggs - Scott's ex-girlfriend, who has since married a policeman and had a child.
- Cullen Cole - the son of the town's only black family, he faces a lot of hostility.
- Matt "the Anarchist" - an orphan, he is physically imposing, but uses the Internet and other surveillance methods to control others and make money.
- Steven Randall - class president, very popular; secretly gay.

== Collected editions ==
The series has been collected into a number of trade paperbacks:

| Title | Material collected | ISBN |
|---|---|---|
| The Waiting Place Book One | The Waiting Place vol. 1 #1–6 | ISBN 0-943151-36-8 |
| The Waiting Place Book Two | The Waiting Place vol. 2 #1-6 | ISBN 0-943151-53-8 |
| The Waiting Place Book Three | The Waiting Place vol. 2 #7-12 | ISBN 0-943151-76-7 |
| The Waiting Place: The Definitive Edition | The Waiting Place Vol. 1 #1-6; The Waiting Place Vol. 2 #1-12 | ISBN 978-1-60010-526-5 |
