= Rhoda Shipman =

American comic writer (born 1968)

- Born: January 30, 1968 (age 58)
- Areas: Writer, Editor
- Notable works: Pakkins' Land

Rhoda Shipman (born January 30, 1968) is a comic book writer from the United States.

== Biography ==
Shipman and her husband Gary Shipman created, wrote and edited the independent comic book series Pakkins' Land, which tells the story of Paul, a young boy who finds himself in a magical world filled with talking animals. The series has received critical acclaim and received an international following and numerous award nominations. Certain characters in the Pakkins' Land stories are named after Shipman's three children.

In October 2021, Shipman released Rhoda's Little Book of Sketches ISBN 9781087977751, a 30-page sketchbook of her illustrations.

== Awards ==
- In 1997 Shipman and her husband were nominated for the Russ Manning Most Promising Newcomer Award.
- In 1998 Shipman and her husband were nominated for an Eisner Award in the "Talent Deserving of Wider Recognition" category.
