= Evan Smith (American football) =

American football player (born 1986)

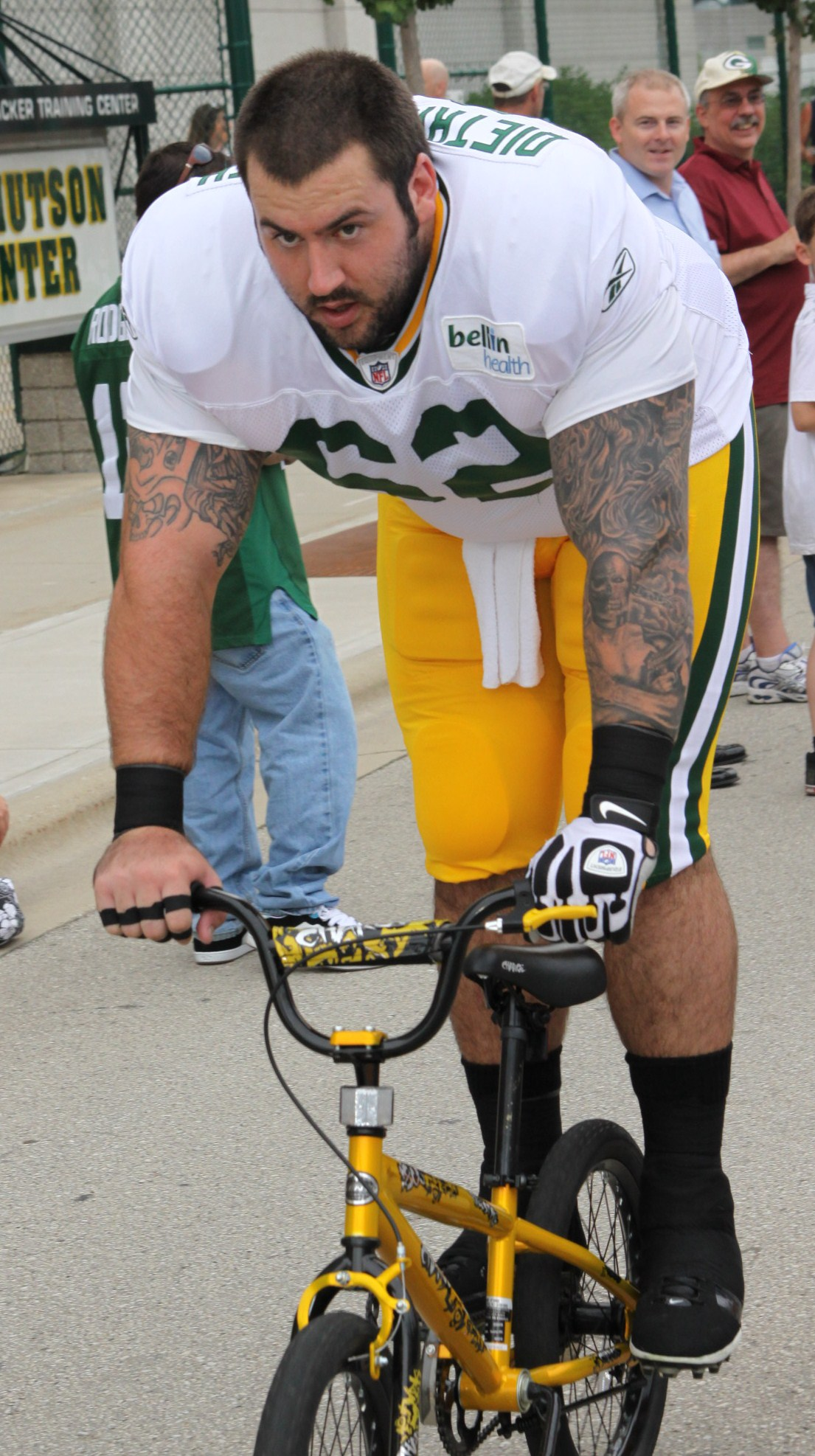
- Smith with the Green Bay Packers in 2011

No. 62
- Position: Center

Personal information
- Born: July 19, 1986 (age 40); Salinas, California, U.S.
- Listed height: 6 ft 2 in (1.88 m)
- Listed weight: 308 lb (140 kg)

Career information
- High school: Salinas
- College: Idaho State (2004–2008)
- NFL draft: 2009: undrafted

Career history
- Green Bay Packers (2009); Seattle Seahawks (2010); Green Bay Packers (2010–2013); Tampa Bay Buccaneers (2014–2018)

Awards and highlights
- Super Bowl champion (XLV)

Career NFL statistics
- Games played: 119
- Games started: 53
- Stats at Pro Football Reference

Evan Blake Smith (formerly Dietrich-Smith; born July 19, 1986) is an American former professional football player who was a center in the National Football League (NFL). He played college football for the Idaho State Bengals. Smith played in the NFL with the Green Bay Packers, Seattle Seahawks, and Tampa Bay Buccaneers. He won Super Bowl XLV as a member of the Packers.

== Early life ==
Smith grew up in Salinas, California. He attended and played high school football at Salinas High School. He also attended Buena Vista Middle School.

== Professional career ==
Pre-draft measurables
Height	Weight	40-yard dash	10-yard split	20-yard split	20-yard shuttle	Three-cone drill	Vertical jump	Broad jump	Bench press
6 ft 2 3/8 in (1.89 m)	293 lb (133 kg)	5.13 s	1.76 s	2.92 s	4.40 s	7.36 s	28.0 in (0.71 m)	8 ft 8 in (2.64 m)	30 reps
All values from Pro Day

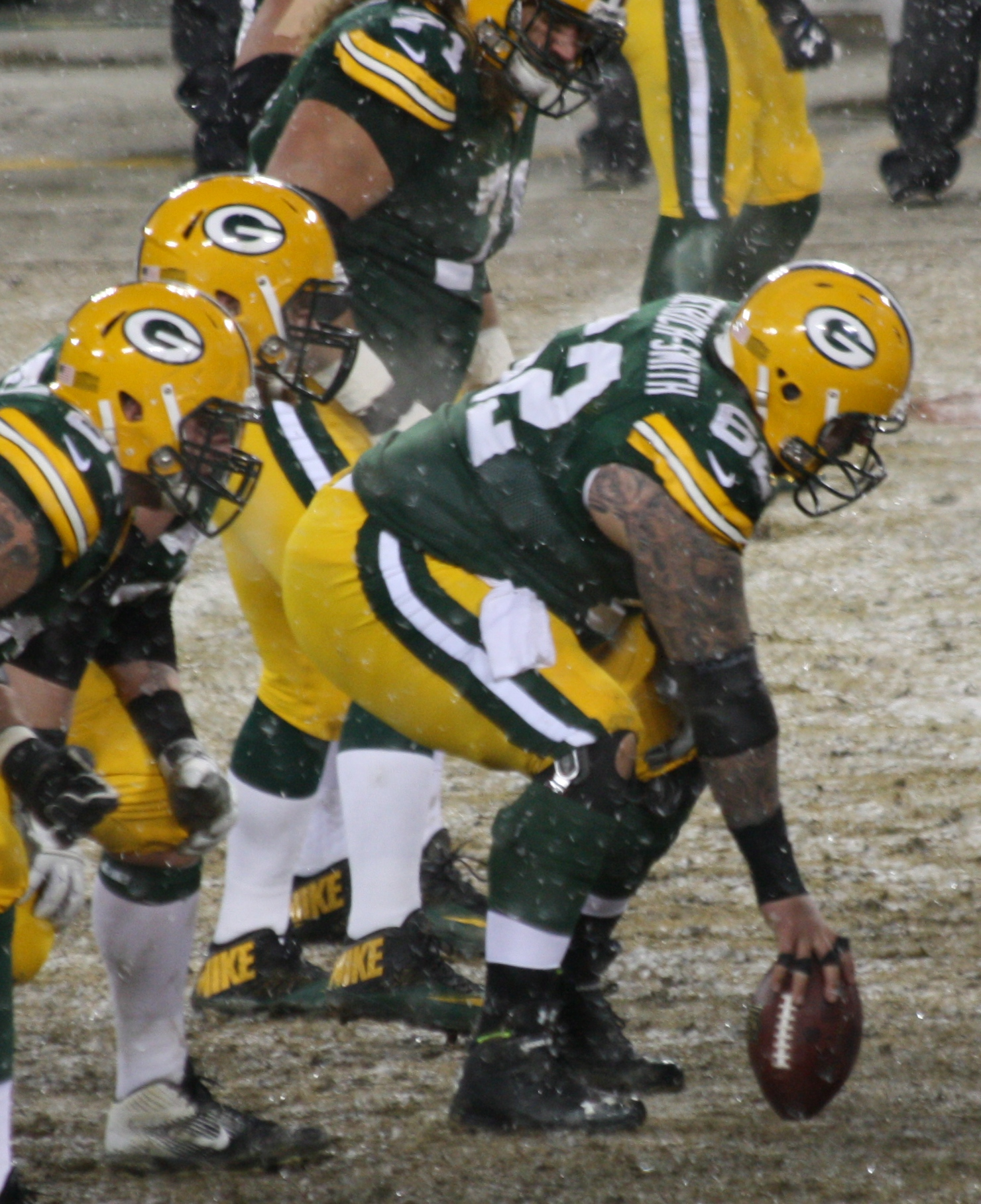
Smith prepared to snap in a December 2013 game

=== Green Bay Packers (first stint) ===
He was signed by the Packers as an undrafted free agent in 2009 but was waived in the last round of cuts after training camp in 2010.

=== Seattle Seahawks ===
On September 5, 2010, Smith was signed by the Seattle Seahawks before being released on October 5.

=== Green Bay Packers (second stint) ===
On December 31, 2010, Smith re-signed with the Packers. He got his only championship ring when the Packers defeated the Pittsburgh Steelers in Super Bowl XLV.

During the 2011 Thanksgiving Classic game between the Packers and the Detroit Lions, Smith was stomped on by Lions defensive tackle, Ndamukong Suh. Suh was ejected from the game and served a two-game suspension. Former Green Bay Packer Matt Brock claims that Smith and another Packer linemen kept untying Suh's shoes and that is what led to the stomping incident.

=== Tampa Bay Buccaneers ===
Smith signed with the Tampa Bay Buccaneers on March 14, 2014.

On March 23, 2018, Smith re-signed with the Buccaneers on a two-year contract. He was placed on injured reserve on November 13, 2018, with a hip injury.

Smith was released by the Buccaneers on August 10, 2019.
