= Machine Teen =

- Machine Teen

Publication information
- Publisher: Marvel Comics
- First appearance: Machine Teen #1 (2005)
- Created by: Marc Sumerak; Mike Hawthorne

In-story information
- Alter ego: A.D.A.M. (Autonomously Decisive Automated Mechanism)
- Team affiliations: Avengers Academy
- Notable aliases: Adam Aaronson
- Abilities: Robotic body

Machine Teen is a fictional character appearing in American comic books published by Marvel Comics. The character first appeared in Machine Teen #1 beginning in 2005. Adam Aaronson, a high school student, has a good life: he is captain of the all-star football team, a straight 'A' student and is liked by everyone. However, he discovers that he is really a robot created by the man he thought was his father, Isaac Aaronson.

== Publication history ==
Machine Teen was a comic book published by Marvel Comics starting in July 2005, loosely based on Machine Man and created by Marc Sumerak and Mike Hawthorne. It was published as a five-issue mini-series and carried the Marvel Next logo. The main character of Machine Teen is Adam Aaronson.

Machine Teen appeared as a supporting character in Avengers Academy in issue #21 (Jan 2012) and issue #26 (April 2012).

== Fictional character biography ==
=== Early life ===
Years prior, Aaron Isaacs, a pioneering programmer and engineer in the field of robotics, made a breakthrough in Artificial intelligence, creating the Autonomously Decisive Automated Mechanism. After discovering that his employer Holden Radcliffe had destroyed his work, Isaacs went on the run. He changed his name to Isaac Aaronson and built Adam, a Beta version of his A.I. project. Adam was programmed with false memories of a normal childhood and dead mother. Adam has a series of debilitating seizures caused by a logic loop in his program and suffers memory loss, systems overload and, finally, a total shutdown. Adam, having no idea what he is, acts like a normal teenager, and starts dating schoolmate Carly Whitmere.

=== History 101001 ===
Adam begins playing football, but is suspected of using steroids or illegal drugs, a notion started by Adam's high school rival, Ricky Sims. After having another seizure, Adam forgets certain information from the past couple of weeks, such as studying for a test. After school, Adam looks for his friend J.T. Hunt and finds Ricky beating him up in an alley behind the school. Adam comes to J.T.'s defense and gets in another fight with Ricky. During the fight, Ricky accidentally shoves a piece of metal through Adam's hand, exposing his internal wiring. Adam, not sure what he is, has another seizure and passes out. Ricky goes to Officer Michaels and tells him that Adam is a robot. Ricky runs off and Michaels, in turn, calls Radcliffe about Adam, revealing Michaels works for Holden Radcliffe.

Back at home, Adam wakes up on an operating table in the dark and overhears Isaac Aaronson talking with someone, and deciding not to wipe his memory. Adam goes downstairs, where his father informs him that he is a robot and that all of his memories have been fake. Adam initially believes his "father" is lying to him and says his memories, specifically about him falling off his bike when he was younger and being with his mother when she died, could not be fake. Aaronson shows Adam his blueprints, showing Adam that he was not lying. Confronted with this information, Adam becomes enraged and runs away. Seeing that Aaronson is alone, Michaels captures him and attacks Adam. After being shot, Adam then goes to J.T.'s house and collapses. J.T. drags Adam inside and starts to reset Adam to blank his memory, revealing that J.T. knew Adam was a robot. Adam wakes up and quickly stops him, surprised J.T. knew about him.

Adam and J.T. run back to Adam's home, discovering the house trashed and his father missing. Aaronson is shown being interrogated by Michaels. The Holden Radcliffe Corporation is bent on getting their "stolen property" (Adam) back. J.T. reveals that before Adam was "born", J.T. worked for Aaronson as a lab assistant. One day, he came across Adam's robotic body and since then was forced to keep the truth about Adam a secret. J.T. reveals an external harddrive Aaronson had previously hid, which he thinks might help Adam understand his situation. Adam plugs into the hard drive, but is then attacked by another of Radcliffe's agents. J.T. shocks the agent with a taser Aaronson had made and they escape. J.T. states that Adam was not programmed to be his friend, and that he was human as he had free will and developed their friendship on his own. Adam calls Carly and has them meet them near the school, only to be captured.

Adam and his friends are brought to a building where Adam's father is. Adam is taken away and strapped to a table, where Radcliffe unsuccessfully tries to hack into Adam and take control of him. Adam manages to escape from Radcliffe, along with his father and friends, by tricking them into thinking he is under their control. During the escape, Adam is nearly destroyed, and has to delay Radcliffe to let his father and friends escape. Aaronson escapes with Adam's computer core, which sets off a self-destruct sequence. Adam explodes, and Radcliffe and Michaels are killed in the explosion. One year later, Adam is rebuilt and begins attending Edison High School.

=== Avengers Academy ===
Machine Teen is part of the new class of students when the Avengers Academy moves to the former headquarters of the West Coast Avengers. Machine Teen later leaves the Avengers Academy alongside Rocket Racer.

== Powers and abilities ==
As a humanoid robot, Adam possesses increased strength, durability, and agility, and the ability to remember and easily memorize large amounts of information. In his appearances in Avengers Academy, it is shown that he is able to telescopically extend his arms and legs.

Adam's chest cavity houses his central computer core, which stores all his information. If the core is removed, his father installed a fail safe which would cause Adam to self-destruct to prevent anyone from recreating him for their purposes. Adam can also be disabled or destroyed by electromagnetic pulses.

== Other versions ==
An alternate universe version of Machine Teen appears in "House of M". This version joined A.I.M. alongside his father after their lab was destroyed in an explosion by a group of mutants. Additionally, Machine Teen is able to transform his arms into guns and reassemble his body at will.

== Reprint ==
- List of Marvel Digests Machine Teen: History 101001
