= Tsunami (Marvel Comics) =

Imprint of Marvel Comics

Marvel Tsunami
- Parent company: Marvel Comics
- Status: Defunct
- Predecessor: Marvel Mangaverse
- Founded: 2003
- Country of origin: United States
- Headquarters location: New York City
- Key people: Joe Quesada; C. B. Cebulski
- Publication types: Comic books
- Owner: Marvel Comics

Tsunami was an imprint of Marvel Comics founded on January 1, 2003.

== Overview ==
Marvel's goal was to create comic books that would appeal to manga readers. Other than the art, the titles shared little in common. For example, Runaways and Sentinel were aimed at children and younger teenagers, while Mystique touched on espionage and darker themes better suited for an older audience.

New Mutants, Mystique, Runaways, and Sentinel earned critical acclaim and a devoted fan following. Human Torch, Namor and Venom failed to generate interest, with the last surviving eighteen issues due to exceptionally high initial sales.

The imprint was discontinued in late December 2003. Mystique was the longest running title – lasting twenty-four issues before it was absorbed into the mainstream Marvel Comics imprint and had a change of writer as part of the X-Men: Reload event after the thirteenth issue. New Mutants, also part of Reload, was relaunched with a new first issue as New X-Men: Academy X. Venom and Runaways carried the imprint branding for the longest period, lasting until their eighteenth issues. After this, Runaways was briefly cancelled before being relaunched as part of the Marvel Next initiative. Venom was canceled outright. The other Tsunami series were canceled after twelve issues.

Since then, Runaways has received a boost from high digest-sized trade paperback (TPB) sales, which was one of the reasons for its relaunch. Sentinel was revived as a five-issue miniseries for the same reason. Human Torch received a single digest.

New Mutants received a single standard-size trade paperback compiling its first six issues and complete collections in the same format of its successor series, New X-Men: Academy X, which was revamped shortly after House of M as simply New X-Men. Mystique and Venom were fully collected as standard-size trade paperbacks.

== Titles ==
- Human Torch (2003–2004) #1–12
- Inhumans (2003–2004) #1–12
- Mystique (2003–2005) #1–13 only
- Namor (2003–2004) #1–12
- Sentinel (2003–2004) #1–12
- Venom (2003–2004) #1–18
- New Mutants (2003–2004) #1–12 only
- Runaways (2003–2004) #1–18
- Wolverine: Snikt! (2003 5-issue limited series)
- Emma Frost (2003–2005) #1 only
