= 24-hour comic =

24-page comic book challenge

A 24-hour comic is a 24-page comic book written, drawn, and completed in 24 hours. Cartoonist Scott McCloud came up with the challenge in 1990 as a creative exercise for himself and fellow comics artist Stephen R. Bissette. Beginning in 2004, writer Nat Gertler helped popularize the form by organizing annual 24 Hour Comics Days (usually held in October), which now take place regularly in the United States and many other countries worldwide.

== History ==
To prove it could be done, McCloud drew the first 24-hour comic on August 31, 1990, and Bissette did his on September 5.

Word of the challenge slowly spread, especially as Dave Sim published his own 24-hour comic, as well as those of McCloud, Bissette, and Neil Gaiman, in the back of his popular Cerebus the Aardvark. Eventually Scott McCloud had collected six 24-hour comics on his website from different, well-known comic-creators. Creators Erik Larsen and Chris Eliopoulos published their 24-hour stories together in the one-shot comic Image-Two-In-One featuring The Herculean and Duncan ("The Herculean" being Larsen's creation, and "Duncan" being Eliopoulos').

Until 2004 (when participation in 24-hour comics expanded exponentially), McCloud kept an archive of all completed 24-hour comics on his website. That archive was later maintained by About Comics; it is now maintained by the Billy Ireland Cartoon Library & Museum, which also has physical holdings of hundreds of completed 24-hour comics.

== Rules ==
As originator of the challenge, Scott McCloud has established rules for a comic to qualify: It must be begun and completed within 24 consecutive hours. Only one person may be directly involved in its creation, and it must span 24 pages, or (if an infinite canvas format webcomic is being made) 100 panels.

The creator may gather research materials and drawing tools beforehand, but cannot plan the comic's plot ahead of time or put anything on paper (such as designs and character sketches) until they are ready for the 24 hours to begin. Any breaks (for food, sleep, or any other purpose) are counted as part of the 24 hours.

If the cartoonist fails to finish the comic in 24 hours, there are two courses of action suggested: Stop the comic at the 24-hour mark, or continue working until all 24 pages are done. The former is known as "the Gaiman variation" after Neil Gaiman's unsuccessful attempt, and the latter is called "the Eastman variation" after Kevin Eastman's unsuccessful attempt. Scott McCloud calls both of these "noble failures", which he continued to list on his site when he believed that the creator intended to finish the project within the specified amount of time.

== Events ==
Nat Gertler/About Comics organized 24 Hour Comics Day on April 24, 2004. On this day, comics creators around the world were invited to spend the day making a 24-hour comic. Many comic book stores supported this event by setting up space for participating artists to work on their comic. It attracted many writers and artists, working both in print and web media.

In 2005, the second annual 24 Hour Comics Day began on Saturday April 23, such that the 24 hours ended on the 24th, with over 800 cartoonists taking part at organized events with other folks taking the challenge at home. 2006's 24 Hour Comics Day fell on October 7 of that year, and had over 1200 participants at official event locations in 17 countries around the globe.

Leadership of 24 Hour Comics Day has been passed over to ComicsPRO, a U.S.-based comic book retailer organization. They held the 2008 event on October 18.

Year	Date	Number of participants
2004	April 24	
2005	April 23	Approximately 800
2006	October 7	Approximately 1200
2007	October 20	-
2008	October 18	TBD
2009	October 3	
2010	October 2	
2011	October 1	
2012	October 20	
2013	October 5	
2014	October 4	
2015	October 3	
2016	October 1	
2017	October 7	
2018	October 6	
2019	October 5	

The School of Visual Arts hosts a 24-hour Comic Day every year, but due to class schedules, the date varies. The Savannah College of Art and Design (SCAD) has an annual, campus-wide event for all majors that includes a 24 Hour Comic challenge for the Sequential Arts program. This event, called "Generate," happens in the fall of each year. In 2013 it occurred between Oct. 4th-5th, from 10am.-10am.

=== Europe, Asia and beyond ===
Lo Spazio Bianco organized 24 Hour Italy Comics Day, for creators in Italy, beginning on October 1, 2005, with authorization from McCloud and Gertler. 24 Hour Comic events have also been held in Croatia and France.

Pulp Faction organise an Australian event known as the Comikaze 24 Hour Challenge over the Queen's Birthday weekend every year since 2005.

Since 2006 Comicworld (www.comicworld.gr) is responsible for organizing the event in the Greek cities of Athens & Thessaloniki. In 2006 they gathered more than 50 participants in the same place. Every year they publish a graphic novel with the best three stories created in the event.

A 24-hour comic challenge was held in a castle on 21–22 March 2015 at Kellie's Castle, Batu Gajah, Perak, Malaysia as a collaboration between Port Ipoh, the Malaysian Comic Activist Society (Pekomik) and Malaysian Animation Society (Animas). The event was the "scariest" 24-hour comics challenge — the castle is known as a famous paranormal tourist spot.

In 2017, Malaysia hosted another hardcore 24 hour comic challenge set in Taiping Zoo and Night Safari on 8-9 April 2017, Perak, Malaysia. The event was the first ever international 24 hour comic challenge held in a zoo or safari and featured comic artists from India and Indonesia.

== Similar challenges ==
The International 3-Day Novel Contest started in Vancouver in 1977 and now happens all over the world every Labour Day Weekend.

The 24-hour comics idea inspired similar challenges in other art forms:

- 24 Hour Plays — a group of playwrights/actors script and perform a full play by the end of 24 hours
- 48 Hour Film Project — a group of filmmakers/actors script and perform a film by the end of 48 hours
- 24 Hour RPG project — started in 2003; asks designers to produce a playable tabletop role-playing game in 24 hours, and holds frequent "Grand Events" which assign a theme and a time window for designers to compete

== Books ==
Five books of 24-hour comics have been published:

- 24 Hour Comics (About Comics, 2004; ISBN 0-9716338-4-3) presents nine comics selected by Scott McCloud.
- 24 Hour Comics Day Highlights 2004 (About Comics, 2004; ISBN 0-9753958-0-7) presents selections from the 2004 event, edited by Nat Gertler.
- 24 Hour Comics All-Stars (About Comics, 2005; ISBN 0-9753958-4-X) presents comics by several professional cartoonists, edited by Nat Gertler.
- 24 Hour Comics Day Highlights 2005 (About Comics, 2005; ISBN 0-9753958-6-6) presents selections from the 2005 event, edited by Nat Gertler.
- 24 Hour Comics Day Highlights 2006 (About Comics, 2007; ISBN 0-9790750-0-9) presents selections from the 2006 event, edited by Nat Gertler.
