= Mega Morphs =

Comic book series

Publication information
- Publisher: Marvel Comics
- Format: Limited series
- Genre: superhero
- Publication date: Oct. – Dec. 2005
- No. of issues: 4
- Main character(s): Spider-Man; Ghost Rider; Captain America; Hulk; Wolverine

Creative team
- Written by: Sean McKeever
- Artist: Lou Kang

Mega Morphs was a comic book limited series published by Marvel Comics in 2005. Mega Morphs is based on a series of action figures made by Toy Biz. The comics feature Spider-Man, Ghost Rider, Captain America, Hulk and Wolverine. The comic was drawn by Lou Kang and written by Sean McKeever.

Within the Marvel Multiverse, the Mega Morphs universe is designated as Earth-50810.

== Plot ==
Spider-Man, Ghost Rider, Captain America, the Hulk, and Wolverine have been selected by Iron Man to command large robotic suits of armor to fight evil when a threat for a single superhero becomes too large. Doctor Octopus stole Iron Man's designs and made his own Mega Morph, and was out to create a device that would sap the world's superhumans of all their powers, and would allow Octavius and Doctor Doom to take over the Earth until the original Mega Morphs stopped him.

== Publication history ==
The first issue premiered on August 10, 2005. The Mega Morph toys came with short minicomics that served as prequels to the Marvel four-issue series.

== Functions ==
The Mega Morphs are powered by the super-powers of the superhuman piloting them, allowing the robot to use the abilities of their pilot, as shown in the beginnings of the mini-comics and the Wolverine mini-comic. In it, Octavius' Mega Morph breaks open Wolverine's robot in space, making it so that Wolverine would be unable to breathe, but Logan fought back, saying that due to his healing factor, the robot would repair itself. The statement was true, as the metal that had been shattered instantly started regenerating. Spider-Man's robot can also produce webbing thanks to Spider-Man's ability to create organic webbing. Also, if the superhuman inside has somehow been de-powered (like the Hulk is able to be) or is not currently using the Mega Morph, the robot will be unable to do anything unless the superhuman comes back or their powers return.

== Transformations ==
- Spider-Man's robot turns into the Arachno-Fighter, a vehicle resembling a spider.
- Captain America's robot turns into the Warbird, a vehicle resembling a helicopter, but with legs (the "Warbird" name is unrelated to the alias that Carol Danvers used once).
- Doctor Octopus's robot turns into the Octo-copter a vehicle resembling a cargo helicopter.
- The Hulk's robot turns into the Rage Tank, a vehicle resembling a tank.
- Wolverine's robot turns into the Aero-Slasher, a vehicle resembling a strangely shaped aircraft.
- Ghost Rider's robot turns into the Street Blazer, a vehicle resembling a motorcycle.
- Thing's robot turns into the Clobberin' Time Tank, a vehicle resembling an armored Humvee truck.
- Iron Man's robot turns into the Sky-Fighter, a vehicle resembling a stealth jet aircraft.
- Venom's robot turns into the Spider-Smasher, a vehicle resembling Spider-Man's Arachno-Fighter. The toy is the same, with new colors.

== Continuity ==
Marvel did not originally reveal if Mega Morphs took place on Earth-616 (mainstream Marvel) or another Earth. However, in the Daily Bugle: Civil War Special, there was an article about Tony Stark denying any involvement in creating gigantic fighting machines, which seemed to indicate that it did take place in regular continuity. The comic also featured references to past events in mainstream continuity, including Spider-Man, Ghost Rider, the Hulk and Wolverine's brief tenure as the "New Fantastic Four", and an appearance of the Red Ronin, a giant robot of the Marvel universe.

However the series was confirmed as taking place on an alternate Earth (Earth-50810) in the 2015 ongoing series Web Warriors, which had the Mega Morphs versions of Spider-Man and Doctor Octopus appearing among the myriad of characters who were displaced from their home dimensions by the Web of Life and Destiny.

== Future developments ==
After the third series of toys was released, it became unclear if the toy line would be continued with a fourth. Hasbro acquired the rights to produce Marvel action figures and they subsequently made a similar collection, Transformers Crossovers, which includes giant transforming robots modelled after Marvel superheroes.
