= Nat Gertler =

American writer and publisher about comic books

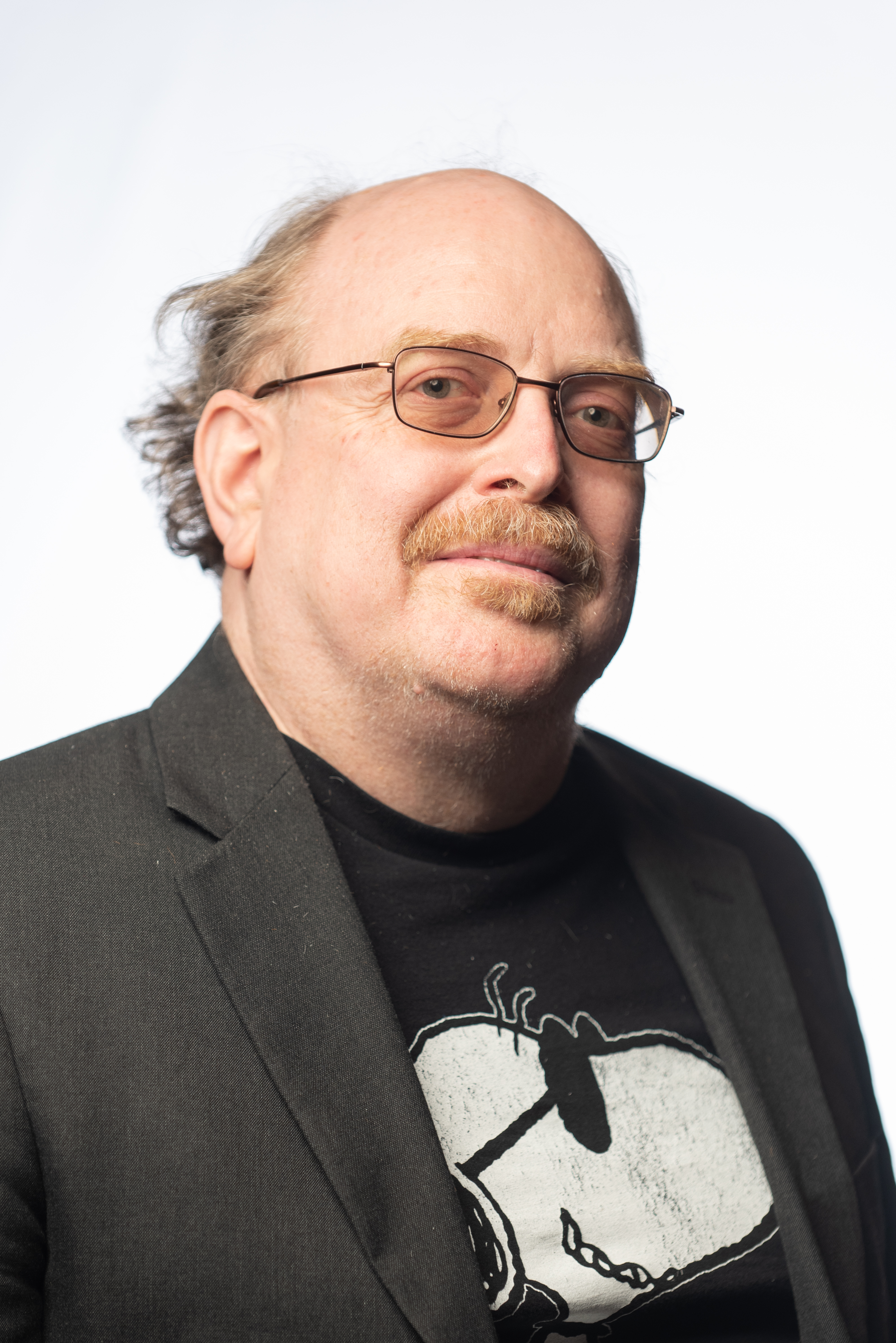
- Gertler in 2022
- Born: April 30, 1965 (age 61)
- Areas: Writer; editor
- Notable works: The Peanuts Collection; The Complete Idiot's Guide to Creating a Graphic Novel; The Factor

Nat Gertler (born April 30, 1965) is an American writer known for his comic books and his books about comics, including six on Charles Schulz's Peanuts. Gertler is the publisher of About Comics and founded an annual cartoonists' challenge, 24 Hour Comics Day. He has been nominated for three Eisner Awards and won one.

== Early life ==
Gertler was raised in Cinnaminson, New Jersey, Simsbury, Connecticut, and Riverton, New Jersey. He attended Bard College at Simon's Rock at 14.

== Career ==
His first comic-book story, the six-page backup feature "The Visit", appeared in First Comics' Grimjack #57 (cover-dated April 1989). He went on to publish horror-comics stories in Hamilton Comics' Dread of Night and Grave Tales in 1991, and through the 1990s did work for the independent publisher Comic Zone Productions, WaRP Graphics, and Caliber Press, and an issue of Blood Syndicate for DC Comics' Milestone Comics imprint. For Image Comics, he wrote stories for Big Bang Comics #8 (Jan. 1997).

He founded comic-book publisher About Comics, initially for his own work, beginning with The Factor issue #0 (1998), and later encompassing new and reprinted work by other creators. About Comics would go on to publish properties such as The Weasel Patrol, The Factor, Licensable BearTM, and The Liberty Project.

In 2004, he founded the annual 24 Hour Comics Day challenge to cartoonists to produce a 24-page comic book, based on a concept previously conceived by Scott McCloud and Steve Bissette in 1990. Outside of comics, he has written or co-written numerous books in the Complete Idiot's Guides series of books, including The Complete Idiot's Guide to Creating a Graphic Novel, The Complete Idiot's Guide to Music on the Internet with MP3 and The Complete Idiot's Guide to Microsoft PowerPoint 2000.

In November 2016, Gertler's company About Comics began publishing facsimile editions of The Negro Motorist Green-Book guides, originally published by Victor Hugo Green and his wife Alma Green from the 1930s to the 1960s to help African Americans travel safely in a segregated U.S.

== Reviews ==
Gertler's 2010 The Peanuts Collection received positive reviews in USA Today. and elsewhere. The Chicago Sun-Times described it as a "slipcovered museum collection" filled with "treasures", and the Christian Science Monitor described it as "a gold mine of Peanuts memorabilia and removable inserts". Gertler's script anthologies Panel One and Panel Two were "highly recommend[ed]" by USA Today for persons interested in learning how to write comic books.

== Awards and nominations ==
- 1999 Eisner Award nomination: The Factor miniseries
- 2006 Eisner Award nomination: Best Anthology: 24 Hour Comics Day Highlights 2005, edited by Nat Gertler (About Comics)
- 2016 Independent Book Publishers Association Benjamin Franklin Award: Gold Winner, Coffee Table Book: The Snoopy Treasures (Thunder Bay Press)
- 2023 Eisner Award winner: Best Comics-Related Book: Charles M. Schulz: The Art and Life of the Peanuts Creator in 100 Objects by Benjamin L. Clark and Nat Gertler

== Selected works ==
=== Books ===
- Panel One: Comic Book Scripts by Top Writers (editor), About Comics, 2002 (ISBN 0-9716338-0-0).
- The Complete Idiot's Guide to Creating a Graphic Novel (with Steve Lieber), Alpha Books, 2004 (ISBN 1592572332).
- Comics prose : short stories (editor and contributor), About Comics, 2004 (ISBN 0-9716338-6-X).
- The Factor (with various illustrators), About Comics, 2004 (ISBN 0-9716338-5-1).
  - reprints The Factor, issues 0–4, About Comics, 1999.
  - issue 0 previously published in Negative Burn 29–31.
- 24 Hour Comics Day Highlights, 2004 (editor), About Comics, 2004 (ISBN 0-9753958-0-7).
- 24 Hour Comics All-Stars (editor), About Comics, 2005 (ISBN 0-9753958-4-X).
- The Peanuts Collection: Treasures from the World's Most Beloved Comic Strip, Little, Brown and Company, 2010 (ISBN 978-0316086103)
- The Snoopy Treasures: An Illustrated Celebration of the World Famous Beagle, Thunder Bay Press, 2015 ISBN 978-1626864405
- Charles M. Schulz: The Art and Life of the Peanuts Creator in 100 Objects (written with Benjamin L. Clark and The Charles M Schulz Museum), Weldon Owen, 2022 ISBN 978-1681888606

=== Comics ===
- Speed Racer Classics (Now Comics, 1998; writer, English script, for original Japanese manga Mach go go go by Tatsuo Yoshida)
  - reprinted in Speed Racer: The Original Manga #1 (DC Comics, June 2000)

== See also ==
- Brie Gertler (Nat's sister)
