= Spider-Man Loves Mary Jane =

American comic book

- Cover of Spider-Man Loves Mary Jane #1. Artwork by Takeshi Miyazawa.

Publication information
- Publisher: Marvel Comics
- Schedule: Monthly
- Format: Ongoing
- Publication date: Mary Jane miniseries: June 2004 – June 2005; Season 1: December 2005 – July 2007; Season 2: August 2008 – April 2009
- No. of issues: 20
- Main character: Mary Jane Watson

Creative team
- Written by: Sean McKeever
- Artist(s): Takeshi Miyazawa; David Hahn
- Colorist: Christina Strain

Spider-Man Loves Mary Jane, originally known simply as Mary Jane, is an American manga-influenced comic book series focusing on a teenage Mary Jane Watson, the romantic interest of superhero Spider-Man. The series, published by Marvel Comics, is a teen drama set outside the regular Marvel continuity and aimed at teenage girls as opposed to the traditional male comic book audience.

Originally written by Sean McKeever with art by penciller Takeshi Miyazawa (who left after issue #15 and was replaced by David Hahn, but continued providing covers) and colorist Christina Strain, the series began publication in December 2005 and was preceded by two miniseries from the series' original creative team, Mary Jane in 2004 and Mary Jane: Homecoming in 2005.

The original series ended in July 2007 with issue #20 and was followed by a five-issue miniseries, Spider-Man Loves Mary Jane Season 2, in August 2008 by writer Terry Moore and artist Craig Rousseau.

== Publication history ==
The initial four-issue miniseries, Mary Jane, originally intended as an ongoing series, began publication in June 2004 under the Marvel Age imprint, a line of comic books by Marvel Comics aimed at younger readers. Marvel had decided to launch a comic book series with a female lead to attract young female readers after seeing a growing number of girls becoming comic readers through manga, and had chosen Mary Jane Watson because of her popularity stemming from the Spider-Man film series (Spider-Man 2 was released two weeks after Mary Jane #1). Mary Jane was also the subject of a popular young adult novel by Judith O'Brien the year before. However, due to low sales the series was discontinued after its fourth issue, with Marvel waiting to see how the digest-sized trade paperback collecting the four issues would sell, before deciding whether the series should be canceled for good or not. Simultaneously, a collected edition of the series was also released in magazine size with a cardstock cover, exclusively available at Target Stores.

After the initial sales figures for the digest came in, Marvel announced a second four-issue miniseries, Mary Jane: Homecoming, which began publication in March 2005. Unlike the first series, Homecoming was not published under the Marvel Age imprint, but as a regular Marvel Comics title, because Marvel Age had by then been restructured into the Marvel Adventures imprint. The second miniseries also saw a slight change in the creative team, as the original miniseries' inker Norman Lee now only inked the covers, while the interior pages were colored straight from Miyazawa's pencils. A second digest, collecting Mary Jane: Homecoming, again sold well enough to justify the continuation of the series. Following writer McKeever winning an Eisner Award for Talent Deserving of Wider Recognition in summer 2005, Marvel announced that the third series, titled Spider-Man Loves Mary Jane and launching in December 2005, would be an ongoing title and not another miniseries.

Beginning with May 2006's Spider-Man Loves Mary Jane #6, guest artist Valentine De Landro took over from Miyazawa for two issues, illustrating the so-called "Dark MJ Saga" (the title being a reference to the "Dark Phoenix Saga", a popular X-Men storyline), which retells Spider-Man's origin from Mary Jane's point of view.

In late July 2006, artist Miyazawa announced to leave the title after issue #15, published in February 2007, to pursue a career as a manga artist in Japan, but he continued providing covers for the series. His successor was David Hahn. Writer McKeever also left the series after issue #20, as he had signed exclusively with DC Comics. Following rumors that the series would end with McKeever's departure, Strangers in Paradise writer Terry Moore took over the series, relaunching with a new #1. Although was originally announced that Moore would be joined by former Runaways artist Adrian Alphona, the new miniseries was illustrated by Craig Rousseau, while Moore himself provided covers. The series lasted for five issues.

== Continuity ==
Unlike most other Spider-Man-related comic books, which share the same continuity, Spider-Man Loves Mary Jane (and the two preceding miniseries) are set outside the mainstream Marvel continuity, and the series' plot differs slightly from Mary Jane's story as established in mainstream Marvel continuity. For example, Mary Jane lives with her parents, not with her Aunt as she did in the original continuity, and she has a crush on Spider-Man (although she develops stronger feelings for Peter Parker). Furthermore, the focus on Mary Jane rather than Peter means that classic Spider-Man characters such as Aunt May, J. Jonah Jameson and various other characters and villains are either de-emphasized or absent altogether.

== Characters ==
=== Main characters ===
The series' cast on the cover of Spider-Man Loves Mary Jane #20. From left to right: MJ, Harry, Liz, Gwen, Flash, and Spider-Man (cropped). Art by Takeshi Miyazawa.

Mary Jane Watson
Called "MJ" by her friends, one of the most popular girls in high school and seemingly always in a good mood. Despite her sunny exterior, MJ has many insecurities that even her closest friends are unaware of. She once had a crush on Spider-Man, which was later complicated by her feelings for Peter Parker, not realizing they are one and the same.
Liz Allan
A cheerleader and MJ's best friend. Liz tends to be very bossy and self-centered, which puts a strain on her relationships with Flash and Mary Jane.
Flash Thompson
A football player in high school and Liz's boyfriend. Hurt by Liz's constant criticisms, he becomes infatuated with the more sensitive Mary Jane. He has a tendency to bully the timid Peter Parker.
Harry Osborn
Friends with Mary Jane, Liz and Flash. His father is Norman Osborn, a wealthy industrialist. Harry often carries the image of a spoiled rich boy (such as when offering Peter a large sum of money to help him cheat on a test), but he can be kind and sensitive as well.
Peter Parker
A socially-awkward and bookish nerd, who is a good friend of Mary Jane Watson and Harry Osborn. Lonely and timid, he is more interested in his studies than his social life. He's been dubbed "Puny Parker" by Flash. Despite Peter's reputation as a "nerd", both Mary Jane and Gwen Stacy are attracted to him. Unaware to his peers, Peter is actually a masked vigilante with spider-like super-powers named "Spider-Man", an alias which he took up to atone for his uncle's murder, something for which he was partially responsible.
Spider-Man
A wise-cracking superhero who has crossed paths with Mary Jane on more than one occasion, and even saved her life. He knows her name and where she lives. Spider-Man is actually Peter Parker, but MJ seemingly does not know this (though in the original timeline, she eventually found out Peter was Spider-Man), and nor would the reader without a pre-existing familiarity with the characters; there are only minor hints to this.
Gwen Stacy
A new transfer student, Gwen quickly becomes attached to Peter and starts dating him, becoming Mary Jane's rival for his affections.

=== Minor characters ===
Betty Brant
Betty Brant was the old girlfriend of Ned Leeds, Mary Jane's boyfriend. After getting re-acquainted with her, Ned decides to go out with her and dumps Mary Jane.
Firestar
Firestar makes a small cameo in issue #2. Mary Jane watches Spider-Man and Firestar battling crime together (and flirting while doing it), causing MJ to become jealous. In issue #16, Spider-Man and Firestar once again team up, and eventually kiss.
Jessica Jones
Jessica was Mary Jane's old friend, until Jessica became a goth. During the time when Mary Jane is in a brief state of depression, she hangs out with Jessica until she is soon happy again.
Lindsay Leighton
The school's resident "Drama Queen", Lindsay becomes jealous of Mary Jane after she wins the lead in the play Twelfth Night. She takes her revenge by dating Harry.
Mr. Limke
Mr. Limke was a counselor at Mary Jane's school. He was ultimately revealed to be the supervillain "The Looter". The character was named after Jeffrey Limke, the consulting editor on McKeever's creator-owned comic book The Waiting Place.
Ned Leeds
Mary Jane's first serious boyfriend, he broke up with her in favor of his old girlfriend, Betty Brant, a year before the series begins.
Felicia Hardy
A tough transfer student who is considered "bad luck" due to her violent past, Felicia flirts with Flash and challenges Liz to a fight. There were no signs that Felicia had adopted the "Black Cat" identity or that she even had superpowers.
Luke Cage
Luke makes a cameo in issue #11 as a student who's interested in Mary Jane, which bothers Harry.

==== Villains ====
A number of Spider-Man villains have made brief appearances or have been mentioned in the comic. These include the following.

- Burglar
- Electro
- Doctor Octopus
- Kraven the Hunter
- Mysterio
- Sandman
- Green Goblin
- Rhino
- Vulture
- Scorpion
- Mirage
- The Beetle
- Morbius
- Shocker
- The Looter
- Rocket Racer
- Lightmaster
- Hypno-Hustler
- Paste Pot Pete
- Gog

== Plot summaries ==
=== Mary Jane miniseries ===
Cover of Mary Jane Vol. 1: Circle Of Friends, the trade paperback collecting the Mary Jane miniseries

As the Homecoming dance is approaching, Mary Jane cannot think of anyone to go with and thinks about not going at all. Her best friend Liz suggests their friend Harry as Mary Jane's date and thus - despite Mary Jane's reservation against dating a friend and her crush on Spider-Man - the two start going out. Then, riding home on the subway after her first date with Harry, Mary Jane's train is attacked by the supervillain Electro and Spider-Man rescues her, reinforcing her crush on him; and she now wants Spider-Man to be her Homecoming date.

Mary Jane decides to get a job to be able to afford her dress for the Homecoming dance, and because she feels dependent on Harry as he is paying for everything on their dates. After going through several different jobs and getting into trouble at school for sleeping in class after being tired from working, she wants to quit to avoid any more problems, but then the owner of the store where she wanted to buy her Homecoming dress offers her a job as a salesperson.

Mary Jane has an argument with Liz because she thinks it is wrong that Liz always calls Flash stupid. She also wants to break up with Harry, because he is more of a friend to her, but just as she is about to dump him, she realizes what a nice guy he is and how much she likes him. Later, after accidentally taking home Flash's notebook and flipping through it, Mary Jane finds out that Flash has a crush on her.

Liz later tells Mary Jane she suspects Flash has a crush on somebody else. During a school football game Liz loses it and attacks an opposing cheerleader who was talking to Flash. After the incident, Mary Jane tells Liz, who still does not know that Mary Jane is the one Flash has a crush on, she will talk to Flash. After the game, Mary Jane waits for Flash at his home and returns his notebook, telling him that she is not going to do anything about his crush on her and that, contrary to what he might assume due to her constant insults, Liz really loves him. However, as Liz, who was going to apologize to Flash for her previous behavior, sees the two together in front of Flash's house hugging, she suspects Flash is cheating on her with Mary Jane.

=== Mary Jane: Homecoming ===
Cover of Mary Jane Vol. 2: Homecoming, the trade that collects the second miniseries

Harry's father is disappointed with his grades and, assuming it is because Harry is dating Mary Jane, forbids him to see her (and particularly to go to the Homecoming dance with her). Thus, Harry plans to cheat on the upcoming physics test so he is allowed to spend more time with her. Meanwhile, Liz is avoiding Mary Jane because she thinks she is having an affair with Flash. When Mary Jane and Harry have to stay in class after school for passing notes, Harry sees his chance to steal the test papers, as Mrs. Feeser is called to the office to pick up some flowers her husband sent her. Mary Jane offers to go pick up the flowers instead. Harry, mad that she sabotages his plans to cheat, breaks up with her.

Liz finally tells Mary Jane that she has been avoiding her because she thinks Mary Jane is having an affair with Flash and Mary Jane assures her that they aren't (making Liz call herself stupid). Meanwhile, Flash convinces Harry to apologize to Mary Jane and to get back together with her, but Harry also reveals to Flash about Mary Jane’s childhood crush on him.

On the day of the Homecoming dance, Mary Jane is thinking about Spider-Man again after running into him twice that day while he fights the Vulture, but Liz does not want to hear about it as she is looking forward to the Homecoming dance and to becoming King and Queen with Flash. Things do not go as Liz planned them: while Flash does become Homecoming King, not Liz but Mary Jane – who wasn't even on the ballot – is voted Queen as a write-in candidate.

Mary Jane is shocked that she won and worried how Liz, who suddenly disappeared, reacts. Flash, who still is not over his crush on Mary Jane, thinks fate brought them together and tries to kiss her during the ceremonial post-crowning dance, just as Liz comes back. While Mary Jane tries to explain everything to Liz, Harry, who had been looking for Liz, comes back and starts fighting with Flash as Liz tells him Flash and Mary Jane made out. Flash, Harry, and Liz breakout into an argument while the rest of the student body observes them. Mary Jane storms out depressed and runs into Peter at the Coffee Bean and he later walks her home, where Liz has been waiting for her to apologize and tell her that she broke up with Flash and that she wanted to become Homecoming Queen so she – despite being her friend – would not hate her anymore for being so popular.

=== Spider-Man Loves Mary Jane ===
Having ended her relationship with Harry, Mary Jane once again focuses her attention on the "unattainable" Spider-Man. During this time she also becomes closer with Peter Parker, who is now her algebra tutor. Peter and Liz both discourage Mary Jane's interest in Spider-Man. Undaunted, Mary Jane tracks Spider-Man down and asks him for a date, which he plainly refuses.

More problems arise for Mary Jane at school. Flash, still hurt by Mary Jane's rejection, bullies Peter and demands that he ends his friendship with her. When Mary Jane tells Flash that he can either stop hurting Peter or stop being her friend, he chooses the latter. Mary Jane wins the lead in the school's production of Twelfth Night, angering another actress, Lindsay Leighton. Lindsay begins dating Harry to make Mary Jane jealous. Peter and Liz work together to split them apart. Unfortunately, this has the side-effect of increasing the wedge between Mary Jane and Harry. To make it up to Mary Jane, Peter fulfills her dream by asking her for a date as Spider-Man.

Complicating matters further is Peter's growing attraction to Mary Jane. He wants to date her as Peter Parker, not Spider-Man, and makes his feelings clear to her the night of her date with Spider-Man. Though Mary Jane rejects him, he still meets with her later that night in costume. They have a pleasant but unsatisfying date, and Mary Jane finally realizes that Spider-Man’s job as a superhero (as well as his hidden identity) would make a romantic relationship impossible. Mary Jane also realizes that Peter is the boy she really loves after all—unfortunately, when she sees Peter the next day, he is entertaining a pretty transfer student named Gwen Stacy.

Mary Jane senses the immediate connection between Gwen and Peter, and chooses not to tell him she loves him for fear of coming between them. Peter and Gwen begin dating. Trying to hide her pain, Mary Jane develops the public persona of an unflappable, flirtatious party girl. During this time Flash begins dating Liz again, and he mends his friendship with Mary Jane. Harry is still in love with Mary Jane but he hides his feelings behind a rich playboy exterior.

Gwen's relationship with Peter comes under stress due to several of his unexplained absences and weak excuses during their dates (in actuality, he leaves abruptly to fight crime as Spider-Man). A misunderstanding forces the love triangle to come to a head; Gwen learns the truth about Peter's history with Mary Jane and realizes that he is in love with her. She breaks up with him. At the same time, Mary Jane decides to put her feelings for Peter permanently aside and reunites with Harry, but student Felicia Hardy soon complicates their relationship as she pursues Harry for his affections.

Spider-Man soon acquires a new love interest, the redheaded mutant superhero Firestar, but is apprehensive about sharing his private life with her. As Peter Parker, Spidey faces the hopeless task of maintaining a friendship with Gwen despite her wanting him as a boyfriend, and refusing anything else.

Felicia's interventions eventually force Harry to snap, and he tells her that she will never have him as he is in love with MJ, but MJ soon comes to the realization she does not truly love Harry, and remains too close to Peter and Spider-Man. Harry is infuriated when he discovers the truth and leaves her devastated.

Peter eventually breaks up with Firestar as Spidey, and refuses to give Gwen the satisfaction of controlling his life to be with her. He and MJ close out issue twenty reunited, MJ assuring him she was always his friend despite recent events. MJ reaches for Peter's hand as the two watch the snow descend around them.

=== Spider-Man Loves Mary Jane Season 2 ===
Mary Jane's friendship with Harry is still broken, but her relationship with Peter, Flash, and Liz remains as strong as ever, and she and Gwen gradually repair their friendship as well. In the meantime, Mary Jane continues to pursue becoming a better actor; she starts a trend called "Limo Girl" after arriving too late to Acting 101 and performing an excuse to as why she was late. Everyone starts to call her "Limo Girl", which bothers Mary Jane after a while. She lands a lead role in the play, beating out a girl named Zoe McCall, someone she was on friendly terms with before casting was finalized. During rehearsals, her teacher demands that Mary Jane performs the same way she did when she created Limo Girl. Frustrated, Mary Jane quits the play.

Spider-Man and Mary Jane continue to see each other whenever the wall-crawler gets the chance to visit her, Mary Jane often confides in Spider-Man about her troubles with the same openness she shows with Peter. After Mary Jane lands a role in the play, someone starts a smear campaign on the school computers, calling her a "diva dork of Midtown High". She initially assumes Harry is the one behind it, though he tells her he's not angry at her for anything despite their history. She is further proven wrong when he tells her the IP address is linked directly to the school and in an area prohibited to students. Mary Jane asks what happened to their friendship and Harry says she "forgot he was alive" when she became friends with Peter. Despite her renewed desire to fix things between them, Harry doesn't want to be "just friends" with Mary Jane.

Later, Mary Jane discovers that it was Zoe McCall who created the slander website against her, and confronts her about why she did it. Zoe explains that she believed that Mary Jane only put herself above everyone else and always thought of herself as perfect, so Zoe made the website to tear her down. Despite the suspect legality of the website, Mary Jane doesn't hold a grudge against Zoe and promises to keep the incident between the two of them. At the end of the day, Peter visits her house and the two of them eat pizza on her front stairs.

== Reprints ==
The individual comic books are being collected into digest-sized trade paperbacks as part of Marvel's line of digests, with each volume reprinting five issues of the monthly series (four for the two initial miniseries). Both original miniseries as well as the first five issues of Spider-Man Loves Mary Jane were also reprinted in one oversized Spider-Man Loves Mary Jane Hardcover (ISBN 978-0-7851-2610-2), released March 28, 2007, by Marvel Comics. A second hardcover, reprinting the remaining 15 issues of Spider-Man Loves Mary Jane, was released in August 2008.

The original miniseries has also been reprinted in one magazine-sized volume that was exclusively available at Target stores, while its four individual issues have additionally been reprinted as library binding hardcovers by Spotlight Publications in January 2006.

=== Collected editions ===
#	Title	Material collected	Format	Pages	Released	ISBN
1	Circle of Friends	Mary Jane #1–4	Digest	96	17 Nov 2004	978-0785114673
2	Homecoming	Mary Jane: Homecoming #1–4	Digest	96	19 Oct 2005	978-0785117797
1	Super Crush	Spider-Man Loves Mary Jane #1–5	Digest	120	26 Jul 2006	978-0785119548
2	The New Girl	Spider-Man Loves Mary Jane #6–10	Digest	120	10 Jan 2007	978-0785122654
3	My Secret Life	Spider-Man Loves Mary Jane #11–15	Digest	120	6 Jun 2007	978-0785122661
4	Still Friends	Spider-Man Loves Mary Jane #16–20	Digest	120	17 Oct 2007	978-0785125648
	Sophomore Jinx	Spider-Man Loves Mary Jane Season 2 #1–5	HC	120	1 Apr 2009	Bookstore cover: 978-0785130048
	Sophomore Jinx	Spider-Man Loves Mary Jane Season 2 #1–5	HC	120	1 Apr 2009	Direct Market cover: 978-0785139607
1	The Real Thing	Mary Jane #1–4; Mary Jane: Homecoming #1-4; Spider-Man Loves Mary Jane #1–3	Digest	272	25 Jun 2019	978-1302918736
2	The Unexpected Thing	Spider-Man Loves Mary Jane #4–13	Digest	256	22 Oct 2019	978-1302919788
3	The Secret Thing	Spider-Man Loves Mary Jane #14–20; Spider-Man Loves Mary Jane Season 2 (2008) #1–5	Digest	288	13 Oct 2020	978-1302925376
Oversized Hardcovers
1	Spider-Man Loves Mary Jane Vol. 1	Mary Jane #1–4; Mary Jane: Homecoming #1–4; Spider-Man Loves Mary Jane (2005) #1–5	OHC	320	11 Apr 2007	978-0785126102
2	Spider-Man Loves Mary Jane Vol. 2	Spider-Man Loves Mary Jane (2005) #6–20	OHC	368	3 Sep 2008	978-0785130833

=== List of library binding hardcovers by Spotlight ===
- Mary Jane: The Real Thing (ISBN 1-59961-039-6/ISBN 978-1-59961-039-9, 2006-01-01) reprints Mary Jane #1
- Mary Jane: The Money Thing (ISBN 1-59961-038-8/ISBN 978-1-59961-038-2, 2006-01-01) reprints Mary Jane #2
- Mary Jane: The Loyalty Thing (ISBN 1-59961-037-X/ISBN 978-1-59961-037-5, 2006-01-01) reprints Mary Jane #3
- Mary Jane: The Trust Thing (ISBN 1-59961-040-X/ISBN 978-1-59961-040-5, 2006-09-01) reprints Mary Jane #4

=== Infinity Comics (digital releases) ===
- Spider-Man Loves Mary Jane 001 (UPC 75960620302400111, 2021-08-09/2021-09-02): Free version of Spider-Man Loves Mary Jane (2005) #1.
- Spider-Man Loves Mary Jane 002 (UPC 75960620302400211, 2021-08-09/2021-09-02): Free version of Spider-Man Loves Mary Jane (2005) #2.
- Spider-Man Loves Mary Jane 003 (UPC 75960620302400311, 2021-08-09/2021-09-02): Free version of Spider-Man Loves Mary Jane (2005) #3.
- Spider-Man Loves Mary Jane 004 (UPC 75960620302400411, 2021-08-09/2021-09-02): Free version of Spider-Man Loves Mary Jane (2005) #4.
- Spider-Man Loves Mary Jane 005 (UPC 75960620302400511, 2021-08-09/2021-09-02): Free version of Spider-Man Loves Mary Jane (2005) #5.
