= Little Red Hot =

Front cover of Little Red Hot: Chane of Fools #1

Little Red Hot is an American comic book series created, written and drawn by film concept artist Dawn Brown. The book is published by Image Comics. The series currently consists of two mini-series: Chane of Fools, published in 1999, and Bound, published in 2001.

== Plot summary ==
The series revolves around the adventures of Chane, a bounty hunter who tracks down people who have broken their deal with the Devil. Bored and frustrated with her life, Chane accepts an unusual assignment. A miserly billionaire, Mr. Ball, learns he is dying, and wants forgiveness for his years of corruption and selfishness. He hires Chane to help him find God before he dies.

Against direct orders from the Devil, Chane accepts the assignment and embarks on worldwide adventures in search of God. A treacherous encounter in the desert awakens something in Chane, and she begins the search for her own redemption.

== Collected editions ==
The three issue mini-series Chane of Fools is collected into a trade paperback by Image Comics called Little Red Hot: The Foolish Collection.

A Little Red Hot short story appears in the anthology graphic novel, Rockets & Robots published by Komikwerks.

- Little Red Hot: The Foolish Collection 1999, ISBN 1-58240-107-1
- Komikwerks Presents: Rockets & Robots 2005, ISBN 0-97428-033-X

== Awards ==
Little Red Hot and creator Dawn Brown won a grant from the Xeric Foundation in 1998.

Dawn Brown was nominated for the Kimberly Yale Award for Best New Talent at the Lulu Awards in 1999 for her work on Little Red Hot.

Dawn Brown was nominated for an Eisner Award in 2006 for "Talent Deserving of Wider Recognition" for her work on Little Red Hot and Ravenous.
