= Ryan Jensen (baseball, born 1997) =

American baseball player (born 1997)

Free agent
- Pitcher
- Born: November 23, 1997 (age 28); Monterey, California, U.S.
- Bats: Right Throws: Right

Ryan Austin Jensen (born November 23, 1997) is an American professional baseball pitcher who is a free agent. He played college baseball at Fresno State University.

== Amateur career ==
Jensen attended Salinas High School in Salinas, California. In 2016, as a senior, he went 2–5 with a 2.75 ERA. He was not drafted in the 2016 Major League Baseball draft, thus enrolling at Fresno State University. He struggled as a freshman in 2017 and as a sophomore in 2018, posting ERAs of 6.60 and 5.35, respectively. He broke out as a junior in 2019, going 12–1 with a 2.88 ERA in 16 games and being named Mountain West Conference Male Athlete of the Year and Pitcher of the Year.

== Professional career ==
=== Chicago Cubs ===
Jensen was selected by the Chicago Cubs with the 27th overall pick in the 2019 Major League Baseball draft. He signed with the Cubs for $2 million and was assigned to the Low-A Eugene Emeralds. Over six starts for Eugene, Jensen compiled a 2.25 ERA, striking out 19 over 12 innings. He did not play in a game in 2020 due to the cancellation of the minor league season because of the COVID-19 pandemic.

Jensen split the 2021 season between the High-A South Bend Cubs and Double-A Tennessee Smokies, going 3–7 with a 4.16 ERA and ninety strikeouts over eighty innings. He was selected to play in the Arizona Fall League for the Mesa Solar Sox after the season. Jensen returned to Tennessee for the 2022 season, making 17 starts in which he recorded a 2-4 record and 4.25 ERA with 60 strikeouts across 59 1/3 innings pitched. On November 15, 2022, the Cubs added Jensen to their 40-man roster to protect him from the Rule 5 draft.

Jensen was optioned to the Double-A Tennessee Smokies to begin the 2023 season. In 30 games split between Tennessee and the Triple-A Iowa Cubs, he accumulated a 2–7 record and 5.77 ERA with 66 strikeouts over 53 innings of work.

=== Seattle Mariners ===
On August 8, 2023, Jensen was claimed off waivers by the Seattle Mariners. In 13 games for the Triple-A Tacoma Rainiers, he pitched to a 3.18 ERA with 12 strikeouts across 11 1/3 innings of work. On November 22, Jensen was designated for assignment by the Mariners.

=== Minnesota Twins ===
On November 27, 2023, Jensen was claimed off waivers by the Miami Marlins. On December 20, Jensen was designated for assignment following the acquisition of Roddery Muñoz.

Jensen was claimed off waivers by the Minnesota Twins on January 4, 2024. The Twins designated him for assignment on February 2, 2024, and later sent him outright to the Triple-A St. Paul Saints after he cleared waivers on February 6. In 44 appearances (three starts) for St. Paul, Jensen compiled a 4-5 record and 4.76 ERA with 81 strikeouts across 56 2/3 innings pitched.

Jensen made 21 appearances for Triple-A St. Paul in 2025, struggling to a 2-4 record and 6.59 ERA with 39 strikeouts across 28 2/3 innings pitched. Jensen was released by the Twins organization on June 25, 2025.

=== Chicago Cubs (second stint) ===
On July 3, 2025, Jensen signed a minor league contract with the Chicago Cubs.

Jensen split the 2026 season between the rookie–level Arizona Complex League Cubs, Double–A Knoxville Smokies, and Triple–A Iowa Cubs, accumulating a 2–2 record and 4.07 ERA with 24 strikeouts and one save across 24 1/3 innings pitched. Jensen was released by the Cubs organization on July 20, 2026.
