= Marc Sumerak =

American writer (born 1978)

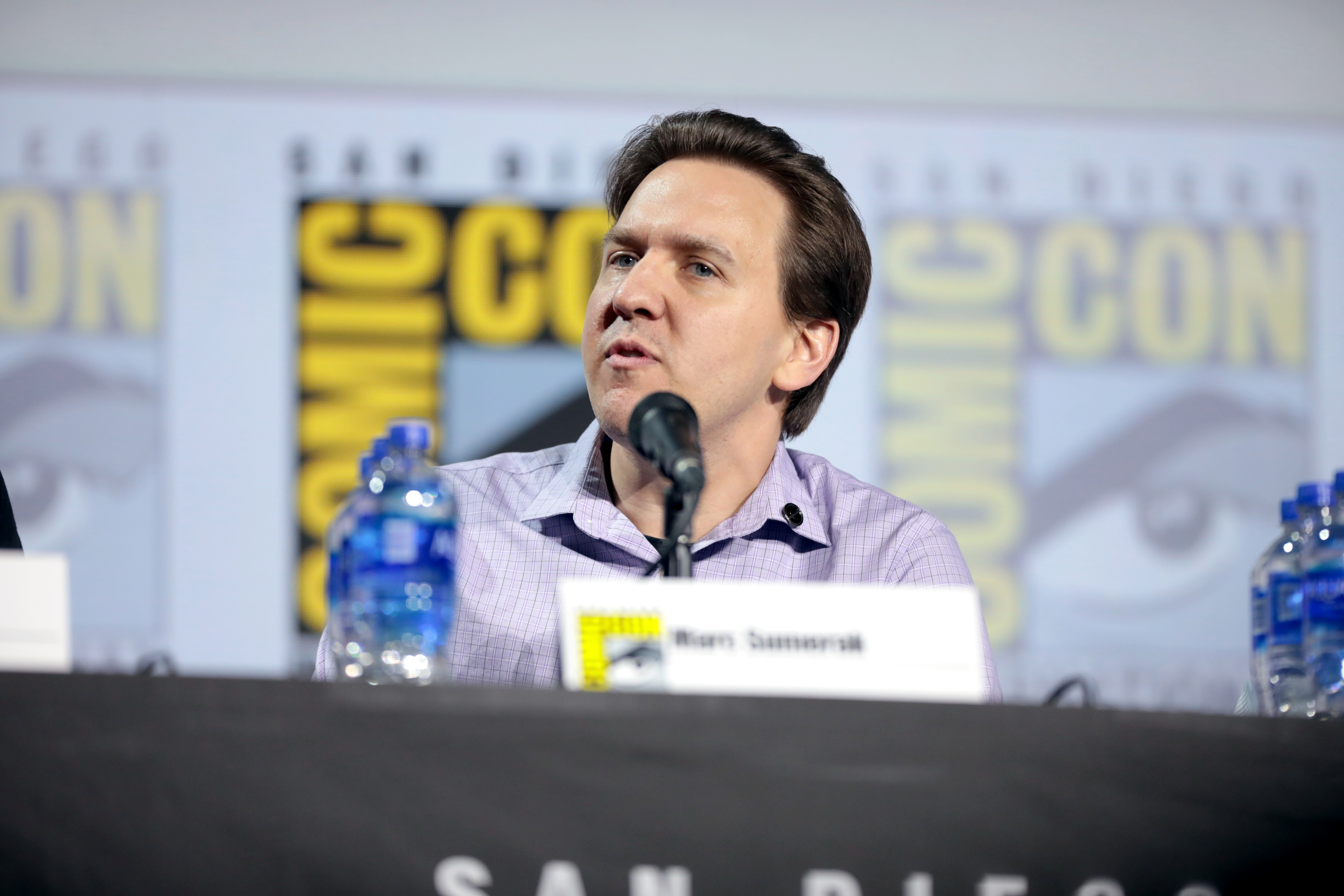
- Sumerak, speaking at the San Diego Convention Center, 2019
- Born: 1978 (age 47–48); Solon, Ohio
- Occupation: Freelance comic book writer

Marc Sumerak (born 1978 in Solon, Ohio) is a freelance comic book writer from Cleveland, Ohio. He graduated from Bowling Green State University in 2000 and worked as an editor at Marvel Comics before becoming a freelance writer. His credits include work on Avengers, Thor, Iron Man, Fantastic Four, Black Panther, Captain Marvel, Thunderbolts, Hulk, Sentinel, Agent X and many more. He was a member of the Marvel editorial team from 1999 to 2003, working alongside editor Tom Brevoort.

He is known for his work on Marvel Comics' all-ages Power Pack series (of which he has written seven consecutive 4-issue limited series), as well as the Eisner Award & Harvey Award nominated Franklin Richards: Son of a Genius (with co-writer Chris Eliopoulos). He is also currently providing the English translations for Spider-Man J (featured in the bi-monthly Spider-Man Family series). Other pieces he has authored include: Guardians, Marvel Age: Fantastic Four, Machine Teen, Ororo: Before the Storm and more. His first published work as a writer was the Avengers Casebook 1999. He also handled the writing process for the game Marvel Ultimate Alliance 3: The Black Order.

Sumerak has stated that one of his main influences was the time he spent working as a costumed character at SeaWorld in Aurora, Ohio.
