= Gary Shipman =

American novelist

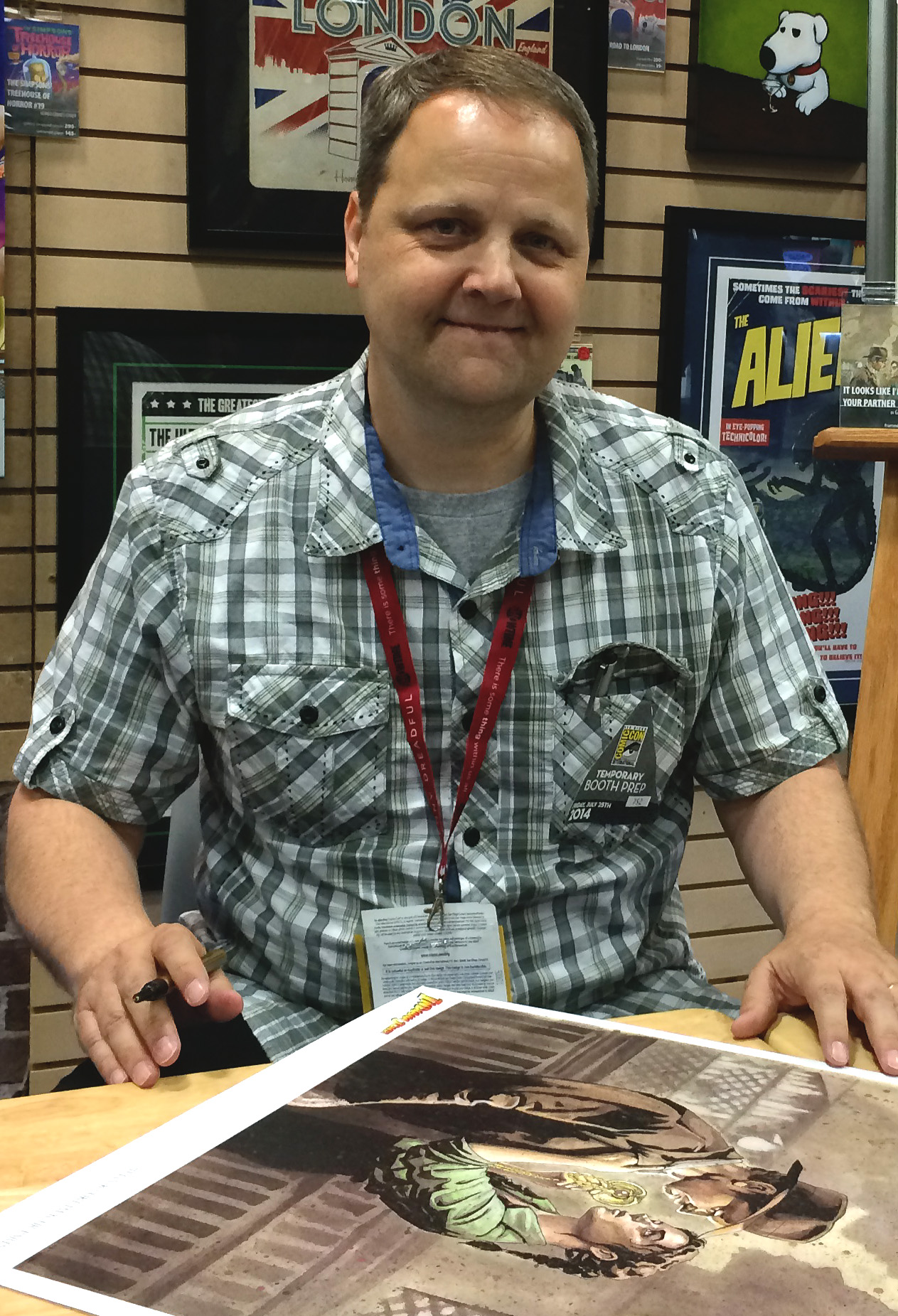
- Gary Shipman signs his Indiana Jones artwork at San Diego Comic-Con in 2014.
- Born: March 16, 1966 (age 60)
- Areas: Writer, Penciller, Inker, Letterer, Colourist
- Notable works: Pakkins' Land

Gary Lee Shipman (born March 16, 1966) is an American artist, comic book illustrator and writer of Pakkins' Land. He is father to three children.

== Biography ==
Shipman grew up in Salinas, California and is a self-taught artist. His interest in comics and art first began at a young age, while in the sixth grade.

Shipman, with wife Rhoda Shipman, first created the independently produced comic book series Pakkins' Land in 1995, both plotting out the stories together and Gary scripting, lettering, penciling, and inking the illustrations for the series. Pakkins' Land tells the adventuresome and engaging tale of Paul, a young boy who finds himself in a magical world filled with talking animals, mystery and excitement. Pakkins' Land has been heralded for excellence by both critics and peers alike, accumulating an international following and numerous award nominations.

Certain characters in the Pakkins' Land stories are named after Shipman's children.

Shipman resides in Illinois with his family and, at times, makes appearances as a guest artist at comic conventions in the region.

Shipman has dyslexia and has shared about coping with it, at times, on his YouTube live streams.

In late 2013, a 46-page color collection of his artistry: The Gary Shipman Sketchbook Volume #1, ISBN 1600392016 was published by Lamp Post, Inc., released as both a perfect-bound paperback edition and also as a Kindle e-book.

In 2016, the Gary Shipman Sketchbook 2016, a 45-page paperback collection of Shipman's artwork, was self-published and offered online.

In 2018, Shipman started a Patreon account and began regularly live streaming drawing sessions on his YouTube channel where he chats and interacts with fans from around the world.

In late 2018, Gary Shipman 2018 Sketchbook, A full-color 70 page collection of his art, was crowdfunded in an Indiegogo campaign. The campaign was fully funded in minutes and raised $8745.00 (411% funded). The campaign offered incentives such as original art, a republished Pakkins Land issue 1 & 2, and collectible Pakkins Land trading cards.

== Other works ==
Shipman's artistic talents can also be found elsewhere. In 1987, he co-created the superhero character Edge for Silverwolf Comics, and illustrated the first 3 issues of that series.

In 1997, Shipman illustrated the cover of Issue #19 of the comic series OZ, based on the books and characters of L. Frank Baum.

In 1998, Shipman illustrated the cover of Parables & Proverbs ISBN 0-9665118-0-8 published by New Creation Publications.

In 2003, Shipman illustrated Amazing True Life Stories Issue # 2: Spymaster for Crosswind Comics.

In 2008, Shipman illustrated Kingdoms: A Biblical Epic, Vol. 4 - Valley of Dry Bones, and Kingdoms: A Biblical Epic, Vol. 5 - The Writing on the Wall.

In 2011, Shipman was invited to join the DreamWorks Animation Fine Art program, with his first offering being an interpretative piece based on How to Train Your Dragon, made available as the original painting or as prints.

In 2012, Shipman was one of 80 different contributing writers and artists from around the globe for the third and final book in the Fables for Japan digital anthology to benefit the victims of the 2011 Tōhoku earthquake and tsunami.

Released in 2013, Shipman was a contributing artist for both the DC Comics Batman: The Legend trading cards and the Superman: The Legend trading cards sets produced by Cryptozoic Entertainment.

Released in 2014, Shipman illustrated Fun with Kirk and Spock (Star Trek: A Parody) ISBN 1604334762 written by author Robb Pearlman.

Also in 2014, Shipman was a contributing artist for the Adventure Time trading cards set produced by Cryptozoic Entertainment.

In 2014, Shipman started to see his artwork distributed by art distributor Acme Archives, doing licensed pieces in his distinctive style from Disney, Marvel Entertainment, and Lucasfilm

In 2015, Shipman illustrated a label for the Rot Berry (strawberry) flavor of Deadworld Zombie Soda, and the associated trading card series.

In 2018, Shipman was a contributing artist to the Rick and Morty trading cards season 1 set produced by Cryptozoic Entertainment.

== Awards ==
- In 1997 Shipman was nominated for a Harvey Award in the "Best New Talent" category.
- In 1997 Shipman and his wife were nominated for the Russ Manning Most Promising Newcomer Award.
- In 1998 Shipman and his wife were nominated for an Eisner Award in the "Talent Deserving of Wider Recognition" category.
