= About Comics =

American book publishing company

- Founded: 1998
- Founder: Nat Gertler
- Country of origin: United States
- Fiction genres: Comic books
- Official website: aboutcomics.com

About Comics is a publisher of comics and comics-related material founded in 1998 by Nat Gertler. According to Gertler, it is intended to be "[neither] a mainstream comics publisher, nor an alternative comics publisher".

The company has published works by such comics writers as Kurt Busiek and Charles M. Schulz, as well as producing books such as Panel One and Panel Two, featuring comic scripts written by a number of top comics writers. Several of About Comics’ bestsellers have been works that have been rediscovered and republished, including several books of little-known early comics work by Charles M. Schulz. Other About Comics’ titles include Fusion, a shared universe anthology by a number of sci-fi writers and artists originally printed by Eclipse Comics; The Weasel Patrol, an insert comic attached to Fusion written by Ken Macklin and drawn by Lela Dowling; and The Misadventures of Prince Ivan, a fantasy comic written by Diane Duane.

Part of the motivation for the line is the company founder’s own interests and past success with genre specific works. The re-publication of a graphic novel adaptation of Alice in Wonderland with art by Lela Dowling proved to be successful when libraries discovered the book. Their steady purchases have made it one of the company’s most consistent sellers. About Comics’ other area of success has been printing books that appeal to readers with an interest in making their own comic books. The company has experimented with printing full size blank comic books with cardstock covers.

About Comics founded 24 Hour Comics Day, an annual event which now includes comics creators in over twenty countries participating in the creation of over 10,000 comic pages every year.
