= Pakkins' Land =

Comic book series by Gary and Rhoda Shipman

- Pakkins' Land #1 (2005), cover art by Gary Shipman.

Publication information
- Publisher: Caliber Comics (1996–1998); Image Comics (2000); Pakkins Presents (2000–2003); Alias Enterprises (2005–2010); Lamp Post, Inc. (2011-2013); Pakkins Presents (2013-present)
- Publication date: 1995 – present

Creative team
- Created by: Gary Shipman and Rhoda Shipman
- Written by: Gary Shipman and Rhoda Shipman
- Artist(s): Gary Shipman

Pakkins' Land is an epic all-ages fantasy story created by husband and wife team, Gary and Rhoda Shipman. Originating as a critically hailed comic book series, the story was written by the pair with Gary Shipman illustrating the series.

Pakkins' Land tells the tale of Paul, a young boy who finds himself in a magical world filled with talking animals, mystery and excitement.

== Publication history ==
1995 saw the first appearance of Pakkins' Land in the form of black & white xeroxed copied issues called ashcans. Because of the nature of these first three issues being creator-produced, they were very low-edition, and as such have since become extremely rare.

In October 1996 the independent comic book company, Caliber Comics, began publishing the first of the six issue monthly series (including republishing the ashcan editions), Pakkins' Land: Paul's Adventure, as its flagship title in launching an all-ages imprint, Tapestry. The issues consist of black & white interior pages with full-color covers that become the series published format for almost the entire next decade.

In June 1997 Tapestry published the stand-alone Pakkins' Land #0, to serve as a prologue to the Pakkins' Land series.

With the first six-issue story arc concluded, in August 1997 Caliber began publishing (under its own label after dissolving the Tapestry imprint) the second six-issue installment of the series, Pakkins' Land: Quest For Kings, which continued the overall story. Issue #1 was published with two variant covers, one which featured the art of Jeff Smith of Bone fame.

Starting in September 1997 the Pakkins' Land saga was further serialized in 17 short offshoot stories as a full-color weekly webcomic strip presented by online comics' retailer, mania.com.

In October 1997 Caliber repackaged the entire six issues of Pakkins' Land: Paul's Adventure and the Pakkins' Land #0, publishing it as a trade paperback entitled: Pakkins' Land: Paul's Adventure.

In November 1997, with #3, Pakkins' Land: Quest For Kings began a bi-monthly publishing schedule.

In April 1998 Caliber began publishing Pakkins' Land: Forgotten Dreams. Caliber ultimately published only three issues of the four issue series.

In December 1998 Caliber published A Caliber Christmas which featured a seven-page Pakkins' Land story, entitled: Pakkins' Land: Christmas Remembered.

In March 2000 Image Comics published a larger-sized issue #4, which wrapped up the Pakkins' Land: Forgotten Dreams story arc.

In 2000 Pakkins' Land Volume One: Paul's Adventure, Revised Edition ISBN 0-9700241-1-8 was published as a trade paperback by the Shipman's own self-publishing imprint, Pakkins Presents. The graphic novel features a revised look at the first six-issue series, including additional new art and writing.

In 2001 the trade paperbacks Pakkins' Land Volume Two: Quest For Kings ISBN 0-9700241-2-6 and Pakkins' Land Volume Three: Forgotten Dreams ISBN 0-9700241-3-4 were published by Pakkins Presents.

In April 2003 the trade paperback Pakkins' Land Volume Four: Tavitah ISBN 0-9700241-4-2 was published by Pakkins Presents.

In May 2005, Pakkins' Land was realized for the first time in complete full-color as the independent comic book company, Alias Enterprises began publishing a newly revised edition of the series as a monthly title.

From 2011 to 2013, Pakkins' Land The Complete Series: Volume 1, 2, and 3 (of 5) presented in the original black-and-white, included a foreword by comic writers Jim Krueger, Gary Shipman, and James Pruett, respectively, an all-new original painted cover and special features inside. Volume One, Two and Three were released by the publishing company, Lamp Post Inc.

In July 2018, Pakkins Land creator Gary Shipman announced that he was working on new material to continue the series and by December, Shipman revealed that he was working on an omnibus edition of the series which would feature over 400 pages of art, and began drawing new story art for it.

== Reception ==
Receiving accolades from both fans and critics alike, the series has been compared to The Wizard of Oz and The Chronicles of Narnia, and garnered award recognition.

Cold Cut Distribution called Pakkins' Land "a charming fantasy full of childlike wonder" and wrote: "'There aren't enough comics out there for younger readers', say some shop owners. 'Or for the child in all of us', I agree. Luckily, here's one more".

== Characters ==
- Paul - Human
- Mr. Brambles - Bear
- Gus - Jackal
- Tikvah - Flying Squirrel
- Aryah - Lion (The King)
- Rahsha - Human (The Evil King)
- Sedek - Human (The King)
- Shani - Wolf
- Hazak - Gorilla
- Lila - Racoon
- Jeremiah - Elephant
- Nahmer - Tiger
- Sampson - Killer Whale
- Twila - Dolphin
- Kafatz - Kangaroo
- Tamarah - Elephant
- Tavitah - Human (Princess)
- Pip - Bat (Dark Flyer)
- Adelbert - Rabbit

== Books ==
The work is (thus far) composed of 4 volumes:

=== Pakkins' Land Volume One: Paul's Adventure ===
==== Novel ====
ISBN 0-9700241-1-8 published in 2000

- Chapter 1: My Adventure
- Chapter 2: The Long Way!
- Chapter 3: Cliff Hanger
- Chapter 4: The Awakening
- Chapter 5: Death Ridge

==== Comic book ====
- Issue #1: Paul's Adventure
- Issue #2: The Long Way!
- Issue #3: Cliff Hanger
- Issue #4: Death Ridge
- Issue #5: Stranger In A Strange Land
- Issue #6: The Gathering

=== Pakkins' Land Volume Two: Quest For Kings ===
==== Novel ====
ISBN 0-9700241-2-6 published in 2001

- Chapter 1: Quest For Kings
- Chapter 2: The Gathering
- Chapter 3: The Captive
- Chapter 4: ...And A Little Child Shall Lead Them
- Chapter 5: Forbidden City

==== Comic book ====
- Issue #1: Quest For Kings
- Issue #2: ...And A Little Child Shall Lead Them
- Issue #3: Forbidden City
- Issue #4: The Rescuers
- Issue #5: The Confrontation
- Issue #6: Stand Off!

=== Pakkins' Land Volume Three: Forgotten Dreams ===
==== Novel ====
ISBN 0-9700241-3-4 published in 2001

- Chapter 1: Cave In
- Chapter 2: The Symbol
- Chapter 3: Rasha's Dungeon
- Chapter 4: The Confrontation
- Chapter 5: The Healer

==== Comic book ====
- Issue #1: Forgotten Dreams
- Issue #2: Awake Sleeper!
- Issue #3: Strange Dreams
- Issue #4: These Dreams (published by Image Comics)

=== Pakkins' Land Volume Four: Tavitah ===
==== Novel ====
ISBN 0-9700241-4-2 published in April 2003

- Chapter 1: The Change
- Chapter 2: Awake Sleeper!
- Chapter 3: Strange Dreams
- Chapter 4: These Dreams

== Awards ==
- 1997 Harvey Award Nominee in the category of Best New Talent.
- 1997 Russ Manning Award Nominee for Most Promising Newcomer.
- 1998 Eisner Award Nominee in the category of Talent Deserving Of Wider Recognition.
