= Looter (character) =

Marvel Comics supervillain

- Looter on the cover of The Amazing Spider-Man #36. Art by Steve Ditko.

Publication information
- Publisher: Marvel Comics
- First appearance: The Amazing Spider-Man #36 (May 1966)
- Created by: Stan Lee (writer); Steve Ditko (artist)

In-story information
- Alter ego: Norton G. Fester
- Species: Human mutate
- Team affiliations: Defenders Impersonators
- Notable aliases: Meteor Man
- Abilities: Superhuman strength, stamina, durability, agility, and leaping; Gadget usage

The Looter (Norton Fester), also known as the Meteor Man, is a supervillain appearing in American comic books published by Marvel Comics. The character primarily appears in comic books featuring Spider-Man. The character first appeared in 1966.

== Publication history ==
The character first appeared in The Amazing Spider-Man #36 (May 1966), and was created by Stan Lee and Steve Ditko.

The character subsequently appears in Marvel Team-Up #33-34 (May–June 1975), The Defenders #63-64 (September–October 1978), Peter Parker, The Spectacular Spider-Man #41 (April 1980), Web of Spider-Man #39 (June 1988), The Amazing Spider-Man Annual #26 (1992), The Amazing Scarlet Spider #1 (November 1995), The Spectacular Scarlet Spider #1 (November 1995), Web of Scarlet Spider #2 (December 1995), The Sensational Spider-Man #8 (September 1996), Untold Tales of Spider-Man (October 1997), The Sensational Spider-Man #27 (May 1998), Marvel Knights: Spider-Man #6 (November 2004), Friendly Neighborhood Spider-Man #5 (April 2006), Spider-Man Family #7 (April 2008), The Amazing Spider-Man #645 (December 2010), The Superior Foes of Spider-Man #11 (2013) and The Amazing Spider-Man (vol. 3) #9 (2015).

The Looter received an entry in the All-New Official Handbook of the Marvel Universe A-Z #6 (2006) #6.

== Fictional character biography ==
Norton G. Fester is a poorly skilled scientist who is considered a crackpot by his colleagues. One day, he finds an unusual meteor that had crashed to Earth. Excited by his discovery, Fester searches for funding into a project, but his potential investors are more interested in commercial ventures. Fester decides to continue without funding, and while chiseling the meteor, he strikes a pocket of gas. Exposure to the gas gives him superhuman strength and agility. Fester decides to devote his time and new powers to crime. Calling himself the Looter, he attacks banks and offices. After attempting to steal another meteor to renew his powers, he is defeated by Spider-Man.

Since then, the Looter has had little success as a criminal, even after a name change to the Meteor Man. He comes into conflict with Nighthawk after stealing a meteor from Kyle Richmond's home. Meteor Man faces Nighthawk and Spider-Man and manages to escape. Valkyrie from the Defenders helps Spider-Man apprehend Meteor Man. Meteor Man tries to escape on his balloon, but Valkyrie throws her sword into the balloon, causing it to pop. Meteor Man crashes into the ground and is hospitalized for a few months.

Meteor Man reappears at the Empire State University campus, trying to find components from a microwave energy exhibit to increase his powers. This leads him into another conflict with Spider-Man and Giant-Man. Meteor Man creates a transmitter that transmutes the energy in his meteors into microwave energy, which is then transmitted into his nervous system. However, his transmitter overloads and explodes, apparently killing him.

Fester survives the explosion, but his mind is addled by his experiences and ends up as a homeless alcoholic. He robs Nathan Lubensky, but was beaten down by Spider-Man and forced to surrender to the police, who try to help Nathan. When circumstances forced Spider-Man to adopt new identities, the Looter is the first foe Spider-Man battles as Hornet when he attempts to raid the Daily Bugle to steal the ransom that Norman Osborn was offering for Spider-Man. Looter is portrayed as constantly talking to his original meteor after attaching it to a gun.

Looter begins attending Supervillains Anonymous meetings at a church alongside Boomerang, Doctor Bong, Grizzly, Hippo, Mirage, Porcupine, and others. At a Supervillains Anonymous meeting, Looter and Grizzly discuss their violent run-ins with Superior Spider-Man (Doctor Octopus' mind in Spider-Man's body).

During the Spider-Verse storyline, Spider-Man and Silk run into Looter. He has stolen a Spider-Tank and Spiderling outfits from Spider-Island, the Superior Spider-Man's former base. Spider-Man and Silk defeat Looter while his fleeing henchmen are defeated by Spider-UK, MC2 Spider-Girl, and Spider-Ham.

== Powers, abilities, and equipment ==
Fester received abnormal abilities from the meteor he discovered. The gases inside it provided him with extreme strength, stamina, durability, agility, and leaping. On one occasion, he was able to convert the radiation of certain meteors into microwave form. By drawing their energies onto himself, he grew in stature. As the Meteor Man, Fester has immense physical attributes.

The Looter has access to various types of equipment. He utilizes the "Dazzle Gun" (a gun that produces flashing, but blinding lights for quick getaways), a self-inflating helium balloon, and an upgraded stealth suit with bionics in its fabric to enhance his powers. Throughout his career, he wielded weapons from Stilt-Man, Shocker, Unicorn, Trapster, and Mauler.

== Other versions ==
In Spider-Man Loves Mary Jane, Mary Jane's high school counselor Mr. Limke uses the identity of the Looter.
