= Sentinel (comic book) =

American comic book series

- The cover of Sentinel #1, art by Eric Vedder.

Publication information
- Publisher: Marvel Comics
- Schedule: Monthly
- Format: Vol. 1: Ongoing series Vol. 2: Limited series
- Genre: see below
- Publication date: Vol. 1: April 2003 – February 2004; Vol. 2: November 2005 – March 2006
- No. of issues: Vol. 1 12; Vol. 2: 5
- Main character: Juston Seyfert; Robot

Creative team
- Created by: Sean McKeever; UDON Studios
- Written by: Sean McKeever
- Artist: UDON Studios

Sentinel is a comic book series published by Marvel Comics as part of the Tsunami imprint. It was written by Sean McKeever and illustrated by UDON. The story follows Juston Seyfert, a boy who finds and befriends a mutant-hunting Sentinel robot.

== Publication history ==
Sentinel was originally launched in 2003 as one of the seven titles that launched Marvel Comics' Tsunami imprint of manga-influenced series. The imprint was the idea of Marvel editor C. B. Cebulski. Despite featuring a different style to most of the company's other work at that point and some uncharacteristic story ideas, Sentinel and its fellow Tsunami titles were still part of the Marvel Universe. Sean McKeever was considered a rising star in the industry at the time by Marvel editor-in-chief Joe Quesada.

McKeever felt the series was a teen drama with fantasy elements, and felt the story was not an X-Men spin-off "in any real sense", and purposefully sited Sentinel in remote Wisconsin to avoid crossing over. McKeever himself was born in Wisconsin, and would later create another Marvel character from the state, the superhero Gravity, feeling it was important to have characters spread out geographically. However, he did suggest that a "third-string mutant" might be an interesting guest character in future arcs. Editor Marc Sumerak worked on the pitch with McKeever.

As with other Tsunami titles, the series was structured in six-issue plot arcs, which would then be issued in digest-sized low-price trade paperbacks soon after single issue publication. Art duties were handled by Udon Studios; Eric Vedder, Joe Vriens, and Scott Hepburn worked on the series. The series ran for 12 issues before being cancelled. A second series returned in November 2005, this time as a five-issue limited series.

== Plot summary ==
=== Salvage ===
Juston Seyfert is an ordinary human teenager tormented by the seniors at Antigo High School in Wisconsin. He lives with his younger brother Chris and his father Peter, who operates a junkyard adjacent to their house; his mother walked out on the family years ago. Being poor, Juston must find his own fun, and spends the days playing in the salvage yard or constructing robots from spare parts. One day, Juston finds a micro-processor which he then places into a 'Battle-Bot' that he and his friends use. During the battle, the robot disappears into the junkyard; unbeknownst to Juston, the processor was actually the remains of a Sentinel, a giant robot programmed to exterminate mutants. Soon after, Juston falls for fellow student Jessie Ingram. A few days after the event, Juston discovers the battle bot and the half-rebuilt Sentinel in his junkyard. Initially frightened by the discovery, he begins to assist the rebuilding from scrap metal and reprogramming it; the two form something of a bond.

However, Juston soon discovers the Sentinel's original purpose while searching online and coming across an article featuring the X-Men. He programs the Sentinel to not hurt anybody before installing the final component, and creates a harness for himself and goes on an adventure with the Sentinel. The bullies who had plagued Juston hurt one of his friends and turn Jessie against him with by lying that Juston was gossiping that the pair had "hooked-up". Hurt and humiliated, Juston returns to the Sentinel, contemplating using it for revenge. The next day, Jessie tries to find Juston to talk with him when the Sentinel arrives and begins attacking the school, targeting the two bullies specifically. Before they can be hurt, Juston smashes a hot-wired jeep into the Sentinel, causing it to fall and retreat. It is later revealed that Juston staged the attack to earn positive standing at school and in the community, but he begins to feel guilt for the physical and psychological repercussions of his actions. He decides the best course is to use his Sentinel for good.

=== No Hero/Awakening ===
After having the Sentinel lie low in a lake, Juston gets an opportunity to do so when a plane appears overhead one night. While the rescue is successful he and his Sentinel are almost caught trying to save the survivors. The CSA, investigating the Sentinel attack on the school, arrive on the scene and begin attacking the Sentinel in an effort to reclaim it. The Sentinel fights back, despite Juston's orders, which puts their relationship in further strain. Juston is unaware that the Sentinel is secretly repairing its prime directive; the robot begins to hunt mutants once again leading to a final confrontation with the head CSA Agent, who was secretly a mutant and deduced that Juston was controlling the Sentinel. Against Juston's orders, the Sentinel kills the Agent, so Juston is free of suspicion, but the Sentinel is damaged and confiscated. Juston decides to run away and free the Sentinel, then uses its DNA detection skills to look for his long-lost mother.

=== Past Imperfect ===
Juston's friends and family worry about his absence, and his father does his best to try to find him. Meanwhile, Juston stumbles upon data indicating that his Sentinel was in fact used by a previous owner who used it for murder of a non-mutant. He discovers that senator Jeff Knudsen and military official Colonel Archibald Hunt had worked together to take out Knudsen's rival using the Sentinel. In Washington D.C., they discover the Sentinel is loose and could incriminate the both of them, leaving them with one option - destroy it and anybody who knows about it. To do this, they use a new, experimental "stealth" Sentinel Mark VII-A. Juston's search for his mother leads him to an estranged aunt named Ginny Baker, who allows him in only with the hope that she be repaid with money that he received from all his media appearances following his "heroics" at the school from the previous volume. When he tells her he does not have any, Ginny cruelly reveals that she left him and his family because she did not love them. Ginny calls the local news, leading his father right to her as well. The stealth Sentinel catches up to Juston and his Sentinel and engages them. It is defeated, but not before doing serious damage.

The Sentinel - acting on its directive to protect Juston - takes the opportunity to not only repair itself, but to also build a cockpit for Juston to operate from the inside. Juston makes his way back to Antigo, but is ambushed by the Stealth Sentinel who removes his Sentinel's hand. Juston's Sentinel and the Stealth Sentinel do battle while Juston tries to protect his family and friends. The stealth Sentinel, now manually controlled by Colonel Hunt, is about to land the killing blow when Knudsen disables the control system in a show of mercy. Juston destroys the stealth Sentinel, and swears to Knudsen and Hunt that if the pair comes after him or his Sentinel he will reveal their secret. Juston reunites with his father and he learns the truth about his mother. He then returns to school to meet Jessie and the rest of his friends again.

== Collected editions ==
Title	ISBN	Release date	Issues
Sentinel Vol. 1: Salvage	9780785113805	1 April 2004	Sentinel (Vol.1) #1-6
Sentinel Vol. 2: No Hero	9780785113683	27 October 2004	Sentinel (Vol.1) #7-12
Sentinel Vol. 3: Past Imperfect	9780785119142	14 June 2006	Sentinel (Vol.2) #1-5

== Reception ==
In an interview with McKeever for Newsarama, Matt Brady noted the series received good reviews but poor sales.
