= List of The Spectacular Spider-Man issues =

The following is a complete list of all volumes of The Spectacular Spider-Man, with notes for each issue.

== Spectacular Spider-Man Magazine (1968) ==
The Spectacular Spider-Man was initially a two-issue magazine published by Marvel in 1968, as an experiment in entering the black-and-white comic-magazine market successfully pioneered by Warren Publishing and others. It sold for 35 cents when standard comic books cost 12 cents and Annuals and Giants 25 cents. It represented the first Spider-Man spin-off publication aside from the original series' summer Annuals, begun in 1964.

The first issue (cover-dated July 1968) featured a painted, color cover by men's adventure-magazine artist Harry Rosenbaum, in acrylic paint on illustration board, over layouts by The Amazing Spider-Man artist John Romita Sr. The 52-page black-and-white Spider-Man story, "Lo, This Monster!", was by writer Stan Lee, penciler Romita Sr. and inker Jim Mooney. A 10-page origin story, "In The Beginning!", was by Lee, penciler Larry Lieber and inker Bill Everett.

The feature story was reprinted in color, with some small alterations and bridging material by Gerry Conway, in The Amazing Spider-Man #116–118 (Jan.–March 1973) as "Suddenly...the Smasher!", "The Deadly Designs of the Disruptor!", and "Countdown to Chaos!" (with additional inking by Tony Mortellaro on the latter two). These versions were themselves reprinted in Marvel Tales #95–97 (Sept.-Oct. 1978).

The second and final issue (Nov. 1968) also sported a painted cover and the interior was in color as well. Lee, Romita and Mooney again collaborated on its single story, "The Goblin Lives!", featuring the Green Goblin. A next-issue box at the end promoted the planned contents of the unrealized issue #3, "The Mystery of the TV Terror". A version of the Goblin story, trimmed by 18 pages, was reprinted in The Amazing Spider-Man Annual #9 (1973), and portions of the "TV Terror" costume were reused for the costume of the Prowler.

== Peter Parker, The Spectacular Spider-Man #1–100 (October 1976 – January 1985) ==
Issue #	Title	Author / Illustrator	Editor	Release date
1	Twice Stings the Tarantula!	Gerry Conway/Sal Buscema	Gerry Conway	Oct. 1976
2	Kraven Is The Hunter!	Conway/Buscema	Gerry Conway	Nov. 1976
3	...And there was Lightmaster!	Jim Shooter/Conway/Buscema	Gerry Conway	Dec. 1976
4	The Vulture Is a Bird of Prey	Archie Goodwin/Buscema	Archie Goodwin	Jan. 1977
5	Spider-Kill	Goodwin/Buscema	Archie Goodwin	Feb. 1977
6	The Power to Purge!	Conway/Ross Andru	Archie Goodwin	March 1977
7	Cry Mayhem -- Cry Morbius!	Goodwin/Buscema	Archie Goodwin	April 1977
8	...And Only One Shall Survive!	Goodwin/Buscema	Archie Goodwin	May 1977
9	Like a Tiger in the Night!	Bill Mantlo/Buscema	Archie Goodwin	June 1977
10	Tiger in a Web!	Mantlo/Buscema	Archie Goodwin	July 1977
11	A Life Too Far	Chris Claremont/Jim Mooney	Archie Goodwin	Aug. 1977
12	Brother Power, Sister Sun!	Mantlo/Buscema	Archie Goodwin	Sept. 1977
13	...The Coming of Razorback!	Mantlo/Buscema	Archie Goodwin	Oct. 1977
14	Killing Me Softly... With His Hate!	Mantlo/Buscema	Archie Goodwin	Nov. 1977
15	The Final Rage!	Mantlo/Buscema	Archie Goodwin	Dec. 1977
16	The Beetle and the Badge!	Elliot S. Maggin/Buscema	Archie Goodwin	Jan. 1978
17	Whatever Happened to the Iceman?	Mantlo/Buscema	Archie Goodwin	Feb. 1978
18	My Friend, My Foe!	Mantlo/Buscema	Archie Goodwin	March 1978
19	Again, the Enforcers!	Mantlo/Buscema	Jim Shooter	April 1978
20	Where Were You When the Lights Went Out?	Mantlo/Buscema	Jim Shooter	May 1978
21	Still Crazy After All These Years	Mantlo/Mooney	Jim Shooter	June 1978
22	By the Light of the Silvery Moon Knight!	Mantlo/Mike Zeck	Bob Hall	July 1978
23	Guess Who's Buried in Grant's Tomb!	Mantlo/Mooney	Bob Hall	Aug. 1978
24	Spider-Man Night Fever	Mantlo/Frank Springer	Bob Hall	Sept. 1978
25	Carrion, My Wayward Son	Mantlo/Mooney	Bob Hall	Oct. 1978
26	Mine Eyes Have Seen the Glory	Mantlo/Mooney	Jo Duffy	Nov. 1978
27	The Blind Leading The Blind	Mantlo/Frank Miller	Jo Duffy	Dec. 1978
28	Ashes to Ashes!	Mantlo/Miller	Al Milgrom	Jan. 1979
29	Dust to Dust!	Mantlo/Mooney	Al Milgrom	Feb. 1979
30	Secret As the Grave!	Mantlo/Mooney	Al Milgrom	March 1979
31	Til Death Do Us Part!	Mantlo/Mooney	Al Milgrom	April 1979
32	A Zoo Story	Mantlo/Mooney	Al Milgrom	May 1979
33	Night Of The Iguana!	Mantlo/Mooney	Al Milgrom	June 1979
34	Lizards On A Hot Tin Roof!	Mantlo/Mooney	Al Milgrom	July 1979
35	Labyrinth	Tony Isabella/Lee Elias	Jim Shooter	Aug. 1979
36	Enter: Swarm!	Mantlo/Mooney	Jim Shooter	Sept. 1979
37	Into the Hive!	Mantlo/Mooney	Jim Shooter	Oct. 1979
38	Curse of the Living Vampire!	Mantlo/Buscema	Jim Shooter	Nov. 1979
39	Scourge of the Schizoid-Man	Mantlo/John Romita, Jr.	Jim Shooter	Dec. 1979
40	The Terrible Turnabout!	Mantlo/Springer	Al Milgrom	Jan. 1980
41	Meteor Madness!	Tom DeFalco/Mooney	Denny O'Neil	Feb. 1980
42	Give Me Liberty or Give Me Death!	Mantlo/Zeck	Denny O'Neil	March 1980
43	Pretty Poison	Roger Stern/Zeck	Denny O'Neil	April 1980
44	The Vengeance Gambit	Marv Wolfman/Steve Leialoha/Al Gordon	Denny O'Neil	May 1980
45	Wings of Fire, Wings of Fear	Stern/Marie Severin	Denny O'Neil	June 1980
46	Deadly is The Cobra!	Stern/Zeck	Denny O'Neil	July 1980
47	A Night on the Prowl!	Stern/Severin	Denny O'Neil	Aug. 1980
48	Double Defeat	Stern/Severin	Denny O'Neil	Sept. 1980
49	Enter: The Smuggler!; The White Tiger!	Stern/Mooney/Denys Cowan	Denny O'Neil	Oct. 1980
50	Dilemma!; A Killer Elite!	Stern/Romita, Jr./Cowan	Denny O'Neil	Nov. 1980
51	Aliens and Illusions!; The Menace of Gideon Mace!	Stern/Severin/Cowan	Denny O'Neil	Dec. 1980
52	The Day of the Hero Killers!	Stern/Rick Leonardi	Denny O'Neil	Jan. 1981
53	Toys of the Terrible Tinkerer	Mantlo/Mooney	Denny O'Neil	Feb. 1981
54	To Save the Smuggler!	Stern/Severin	Denny O'Neil	March 1981
55	The Big Blow Out	Stern/Luke McDonnell	Denny O'Neil	April 1981
56	The Peril... and the Pumpkin?	Stern/Shooter	Denny O'Neil	May 1981
57	These Wings Enslaved!	Stern/Shooter	Denny O'Neil	June 1981
58	Ring Out the Old, Ring In the New!	Stern/John Byrne	Tom DeFalco	July 1981
59	I Want Spider-Man!	Stern/Mooney	Tom DeFalco	Aug. 1981
60	Beetlemaina!; The Birth of a Legend!	Stern/Ed Hannigan/Greg LaRocque	Tom DeFalco	Sept. 1981
61	By the Light of the Silvery Moonstone	Mantlo/Stern/Hannigan	Tom DeFalco	Oct. 1981
62	Gold Fever!	Mantlo/Hannigan	Tom DeFalco	Nov. 1981
63	Firebug	Mantlo/LaRocque	Tom DeFalco	Dec. 1981
64	Cloak and Dagger!	Mantlo/Hannigan	Tom DeFalco	Jan. 1982
65	The Heart is a Lonely Hunter	Mantlo/Bob Hall	Tom DeFalco	Feb. 1982
66	Electro Will be Free	Mantlo/Hannigan	Tom DeFalco	March 1982
67	Boomerang the Killer That Keeps Coming Back	Mantlo/Hannigan	Tom DeFalco	April 1982
68	Hell Hath No Fury Like A Robot Scorned!	Mantlo/McDonnell	Tom DeFalco	May 1982
69	In Darkness Seldom Seen!	Mantlo/Hannigan	Tom DeFalco	June 1982
70	The Great Cloak & Dagger Hunt	Mantlo/Hannigan	Tom DeFalco	July 1982
71	With This Gun... I Thee Kill!	Mantlo/DeFalco/Leonardi	Tom DeFalco	Aug. 1982
72	Waiting For Doctor Octopus	Mantlo/Hannigan	Tom DeFalco	Sept. 1982
73	Peter Parker, You Are the Spectacular Spider-Man!	Mantlo/Al Milgrom	Tom DeFalco	Oct. 1982
74	Fantasia!	Mantlo/Hall	Tom DeFalco	Nov. 1982
75	Ferrae Naturae	Mantlo/Milgrom	Tom DeFalco	Dec. 1982
76	At Death's Door!	Mantlo/Milgrom	Tom DeFalco	Jan. 1983
77	Relapse Times Two	Mantlo/Milgrom	Tom DeFalco	Feb. 1983
78	The Long Goodbye	Mantlo/Milgrom	Tom DeFalco	March 1983
79	The Final Battle	Mantlo/Milgrom	Tom DeFalco	April 1983
80	I Cover the Waterfront	Mantlo/Ron Frenz	Tom DeFalco/Eliot Brown	April 1983
81	Stalkers in the Shadows	Mantlo/Milgrom	Tom DeFalco	May 1983
82	Crime and Punishment	Mantlo/Milgrom	Tom DeFalco	June 1983
83	Delusions	Mantlo/LaRocque	Danny Fingeroth	July 1983
84	Kidnapped	Mantlo/Dave Simons	Danny Fingeroth	Aug. 1983
85	The Hatred of the Hobgoblin	Mantlo/Stern/Milgrom	Tom DeFalco/Danny Fingeroth	Sept. 1983
86	Bugs!	Mantlo/Milgrom/Fred Hembeck	Danny Fingeroth/Bob DeNatale	Oct. 1983
87	Mistaken Identities	Mantlo/Milgrom	Danny Fingeroth	Nov. 1983
88	Hyde and Seek	Mantlo/Milgrom	Danny Fingeroth	Dec. 1983
89	Power Search	Mantlo/Milgrom	Danny Fingeroth	Jan. 1984
90	Where, Oh Where Has My Spider-Man Gone?	Milgrom	Danny Fingeroth	Feb. 1984
91	If It Wasn't For Bad Luck...	Milgrom	Danny Fingeroth	March 1984
92	And the Answer Is...	Milgrom	Danny Fingeroth	April 1984
93	A Hot Time In the Old Morgue Tonight	Milgrom	Danny Fingeroth	May 1984
94	How You Gonna Keep 'Em Down at the Morgue After They've Seen NYC	Milgrom	Danny Fingeroth	June 1984
95	The Dagger At the End of the Tunnel	Milgrom	Danny Fingeroth	July 1984
96	The Final Answer!	Milgrom	Danny Fingeroth	Sept. 1984
97	Hermit-Age!	Milgrom/Herb Trimpe	Danny Fingeroth	Oct. 1984
98	True Confessions!	Milgrom/Trimpe	Danny Fingeroth	Nov. 1984
99	Spider on the Spot!	Milgrom/Trimpe	Danny Fingeroth	Dec. 1984
100	Breakin'!	Milgrom	Danny Fingeroth	Jan. 1985

== Peter Parker, The Spectacular Spider-Man #100–133 (February 1985 – October 1987) ==
Issue #	Title	Author / Illustrator	Editor	Release date
101	Echoes...	Cary Burkett/Juan Alacantara	Jim Owsley	Feb. 1985
102	A Life for a Life	Burkett/Larry Lieber	Danny Fingeroth	March 1985
103	Compulsion!	Peter David/Rich Buckler	Jim Owsley	April 1985
104	The Last Race	Bill Mantlo/Vince Giarrano	Jim Owsley	May 1985
105	United We Fall	David/Luke McDonnell	Jim Owsley	June 1985
106	No Fury	David/McDonnell	Jim Owsley	July 1985
107	Original Sin	David/Buckler	Jim Owsley	Aug. 1985
108	Sin of Pride	David/Buckler	Jim Owsley	Sept. 1985
109	He Who Is Without Sin	David/Buckler	Jim Owsley	Oct. 1985
110	All My Sins Remembered	David/Buckler	Jim Owsley	Nov. 1985
111	And Then the Gods Cried	David/Buckler	Jim Owsley/Maddie Blaustein	Dec. 1985
112	You Never Make a Sound	David/Buckler	Jim Owsley/Maddie Blaustein	Jan. 1986
113	Mayhem	David/Bob McLeod	Jim Owsley	Feb. 1986
114	The Key	Len Kaminski/Joe Brozowski	Jim Owsley	March 1986
115	Things Fall Apart	David/Mark Beachum	Jim Owsley	April 1986
116	102 Uses For A Dead Cat	David/Buckler	Jim Owsley	May 1986
117	Dinner Hour	David/Buckler/Dwayne Turner	Jim Owsley	June 1986
118	Ashes To Ashes	J.M. DeMatteis/David/Mike Zeck	Jim Owsley	July 1986
119	Catfight!	David/Buckler	Jim Owsley	Aug. 1986
120	A House Is Not a Home	Mantlo/Keith Giffen	Jim Owsley	Sept. 1986
121	Eye Witness!	David/John Romita, Sr./John Buscema	Jim Owsley	Oct. 1986
122	Father's Night Out	David/Buckler/Malcolm Davis	Jim Salicrup	Nov. 1986
123	With Friends Like These...	David/Buckler/Turner	Jim Salicrup	Dec. 1986
124	When Strikes the Octopus!	Roger McKenzie/Greg LaRocque	Jim Salicrup	Jan. 1987
125	Wreaking Havoc!	Danny Fingeroth/Jim Mooney	Jim Salicrup	Feb. 1987
126	Sudden Impact	Fingeroth/Alan Kupperberg	Jim Salicrup	March 1987
127	Among Us Lurks... a Lizard	Kaminski/Kupperberg	Jim Salicrup	April 1987
128	Spider Hunt	David/Kupperberg	Jim Salicrup	May 1987
129	Foreign Affairs	David/Kupperberg	Jim Salicrup	June 1987
130	24 Hours	Bob Layton/Jim Fern	Jim Salicrup	July 1987
131	Descent	DeMatteis/Zeck	Jim Salicrup	Aug. 1987
132	Ascending	DeMatteis/Zeck	Jim Salicrup	Sept. 1987
133	I Am Spider!	Ann Nocenti/Cindy Martin	Jim Salicrup	Oct. 1987

== The Spectacular Spider-Man #134–200 (November 1987 – March 1993) ==
Issue #	Title	Author / Illustrator	Editor	Release date
134	Sin–Cere	Peter David/Buscema	Jim Salicrup	Nov. 1987
135	Sin–Thesis	David/Buscema	Jim Salicrup	Dec. 1987
136	Sin–ister	David/Buscema	Jim Salicrup	Jan. 1988
137	Nowhere to Run, Nowhere to Hide!	Gerry Conway/Buscema	Jim Salicrup	Feb. 1988
138	Night of the Flag!	Conway/Buscema	Jim Salicrup	March 1988
139	Grave Memory	Conway/Buscema	Jim Salicrup	April 1988
140	Kill Zone	Conway/Buscema	Jim Salicrup/Glenn Herdling	May 1988
141	The Tombstone Testament	Conway/Buscema	Jim Salicrup	June 1988
142	Will!	Conway/Buscema	Jim Salicrup	July 1988
143	Deadline in Dallas	Conway/Buscema	Jim Salicrup	Aug. 1988
144	An Ill Wind...	Conway/Buscema	Jim Salicrup	Sept. 1988
145	The Boomerang Return	Conway/Buscema	Jim Salicrup	Oct. 1988
146	Demon Night	Conway/Buscema	Jim Salicrup	Nov. 1988
147	When the Bugle Blows	Conway/Buscema	Jim Salicrup	Dec. 1988
148	Night of the Living Ned!	Conway/Buscema	Jim Salicrup	Jan. 1989
149	What About Carrion?!	Conway/Buscema	Jim Salicrup	Feb. 1989
150	Guilt!	Conway/Buscema	Jim Salicrup	March 1989
151	Lock-Up	Conway/Buscema	Jim Salicrup	April 1989
152	A Wolf's Tale	Conway/Buscema	Jim Salicrup	May 1989
153	Siege	Conway/Buscema	Jim Salicrup	June 1989
154	Claws	Conway/Buscema	Jim Salicrup	July 1989
155	Crash Out!	Conway/Buscema	Jim Salicrup	Aug. 1989
156	The Search for Robbie Robertson	Conway/Buscema	Jim Salicrup	Sept. 1989
157	Shakedown	Conway/Buscema	Jim Salicrup	Sept. 1989
158	The Paste and the Power (Or a Very Sticky Situation)	Conway/Buscema	Jim Salicrup	Oct. 1989
159	The Shattered Senses Or A Tale of the Brothers Grimm	Conway/Buscema	Jim Salicrup	Oct. 1989
160	The Metal in Men's Souls	Conway/Buscema	Jim Salicrup	Nov. 1989
161	Pardoned!	Conway/Buscema	Jim Salicrup	Dec. 1989
162	The Demon and the Dead Man	Conway/Buscema	Jim Salicrup	Jan. 1990
163	The Carrion Cure	Conway/Buscema	Jim Salicrup	Feb. 1990
164	Bugged	Conway/Buscema	Jim Salicrup	March 1990
165	Knight and Fogg	Conway/Buscema	Jim Salicrup	April 1990
166	The Deadly Lads From Liverpool	Conway/Buscema	Jim Salicrup	May 1990
167	A Misty Kind of Memory	Conway/Buscema	Jim Salicrup	June 1990
168	Sleeping Dogs	Conway/Buscema	Jim Salicrup	July 1990
169	The Outlaw Trail	Conway/Buscema	Jim Salicrup	Aug. 1990
170	The Final Calculation	Conway/Buscema	Jim Salicrup	Sept. 1990
171	Ordeal	Conway/Buscema	Jim Salicrup	Oct. 1990
172	Savage Showdown	Conway/Buscema	Jim Salicrup	Nov. 1990
173	Creatures Stirring	Conway/David Michelinie/Buscema	Jim Salicrup	Dec. 1990
174	"Dedication (Or, "Jonah Goes to Pieces!")"	Michelinie/Conway/Terry Kavanaugh/Buscema	Danny Fingeroth	Jan. 1991
175	Spouse Trap	Michelinie/Buscema	Danny Fingeroth	Feb. 1991
176	The Love of Power	Kurt Busiek/Buscema	Danny Fingeroth	March 1991
177	Fever Pitch	Busiek/Buscema	Danny Fingeroth	April 1991
178	Up From the Depths	J.M. DeMatteis/Buscema	Danny Fingeroth	May 1991
179	Wounds	DeMatteis/Buscema	Danny Fingeroth	June 1991
180	Shame	DeMatteis/Buscema	Danny Fingeroth	July 1991
181	Guilt	DeMatteis/Buscema	Danny Fingeroth	Aug. 1991
182	Reckonings	DeMatteis/Buscema	Danny Fingeroth	Sept. 1991
183	Into the Dawn!	DeMatteis/Buscema	Danny Fingeroth	Oct. 1991
184	Aftermath	DeMatteis/Buscema	Danny Fingeroth	Nov. 1991
185	Another Fine Mess!	DeMatteis/Buscema	Danny Fingeroth	Dec. 1991
186	Settling Scores	DeMatteis/Buscema	Danny Fingeroth	Jan. 1992
187	Desperate Measures	DeMatteis/Buscema	Danny Fingeroth	Feb. 1992
188	Final Judgement	DeMatteis/Buscema	Danny Fingeroth	March 1992
189	The Osborn Legacy; The Night the World Died	DeMatteis/Buscema/Bob McLeod	Danny Fingeroth/Eric Fein	April 1992
190	The Horns of a Dilemma!	DeMatteis/Buscema	Danny Fingeroth	May 1992
191	The Valley	DeMatteis/Buscema	Danny Fingeroth	June 1992
192	The Summit	DeMatteis/Buscema	Danny Fingeroth	July 1992
193	Over the Edge	DeMatteis/Buscema	Danny Fingeroth	Aug. 1992
194	October Moon	DeMatteis/Buscema	Rob Tokar	Sept. 1992
195	Masquerade	DeMatteis/Buscema	Rob Tokar/Danny Fingeroth	Oct. 1992
196	Faces	DeMatteis/Buscema	Rob Tokar	Nov. 1992
197	Power Play!	DeMatteis/Buscema	Rob Tokar/Danny Fingeroth	Dec. 1992
198	Castles in the Air!	DeMatteis/Buscema	Rob Tokar	Jan. 1993
199	Falling!	DeMatteis/Buscema	Rob Tokar/Danny Fingeroth	Feb. 1993
200	Best of Enemies	DeMatteis/Buscema	Rob Tokar/Danny Fingeroth	March 1993

== The Spectacular Spider-Man #201–263 (April 1993 – September 1998) ==
Issue #	Title	Author / Illustrator	Editor	Release date
201	Over the Line!	J.M. DeMatteis/Sal Buscema	Rob Tokar	April 1993
202	The Turning Point!	DeMatteis/Buscema	Rob Tokar/Danny Fingeroth	May 1993
203	War of the Heart	DeMatteis/Buscema	Rob Tokar/Danny Fingeroth	June 1993
204	Takeover!	Steven Grant/Buscema	Mark Powers/Danny Fingeroth	July 1993
205	Search and Destroy; Taps Part 1	Grant/Buscema/Walter A. McDaniel	Mark Powers/Danny Fingeroth	Aug. 1993
206	Fatal Desire!; Despair	Grant/Buscema/McDaniel	Mark Powers/Danny Fingeroth	Sept. 1993
207	Screaming Crimson; New Values	Grant/Buscema/McDaniel	Mark Powers/Danny Fingeroth	Oct. 1993
208	Fatal Eats the Soul; Moving Day	Grant/Buscema/Malcolm Jones III	Mark Powers/Danny Fingeroth	Nov. 1993
209	Foreign Objects; Fateful Distractions	Grant/Buscema/Nelson Ortega	Mark Powers/Danny Fingeroth	Dec. 1993
210	Crashing; Truth and Consequences	Grant/Buscema/Ortega	Mark Powers/Danny Fingeroth	Jan. 1994
211	Face Value	Mike Lackey/Buscema	Mark Powers/Danny Fingeroth	Feb. 1994
212	Rain Dance	Lackey/Buscema	Mark Powers/Danny Fingeroth	March 1994
213	Typhoid Attack	Ann Nocenti/James Fry	Mark Powers/Danny Fingeroth	April 1994
214	Bloody Justice	Nocenti/Fry	Mark Powers/Danny Fingeroth	May 1994
215	The Monster Within	Lackey/Tom DeFalco/Buscema	Mark Powers/Danny Fingeroth	June 1994
216	Time Is On No Side	DeFalco/Todd DeZago/Buscema	Mark Powers/Danny Fingeroth	July 1994
217	Power and Responsibility – Part Four: The Higher Ground; The Burial	DeFalco/Buscema, DeMatteis/Liam Sharp	Mark Powers/Danny Fingeroth	Aug. 1994
218	When Monsters Roam!	DeFalco/DeZago/Buscema	Mark Powers/Danny Fingeroth	Sept. 1994
219	Two of a Kind	DeFalco/DeZago/Buscema	Mark Powers/Danny Fingeroth	Oct. 1994
220	A Time to Live!	DeFalco/Buscema	Mark Powers/Danny Fingeroth	Nov. 1994
221	A Time to Die!	DeFalco/Buscema	Mark Powers/Danny Fingeroth	Dec. 1994
222	False Truths	DeFalco/Buscema	Mark Powers/Danny Fingeroth	Jan. 1995
223	Schemes & Dreams: For Future Screams; The Beginning	DeFalco/Buscema, DeMatteis/John Romita, Jr.	Eric Fein/Danny Fingeroth	Feb. 1995
224	The Assassin with My Face	DeFalco/Buscema	Eric Fein/Danny Fingeroth	March 1995
225	The Return of the Green Goblin; He Was Such a Nice Boy...	DeFalco/Buscema	Eric Fein/Danny Fingeroth	April 1995
226	The Final Verdict	DeFalco/Buscema	Eric Fein/Danny Fingeroth	May 1995
227	If Death Be My Destiny...	DeFalco/Buscema	Eric Fein	June 1995
228	Run for Your Life	DeFalco/DeZago/Buscema	Eric Fein	July 1995
229	No More The Hero	DeFalco/Buscema	Eric Fein	Aug. 1995
230	Brother's Keeper	DeZago/Buscema	Eric Fein	Nov. 1995
231	Reluctant Lazarus	DeZago/Buscema	Eric Fein	Dec. 1995
232	A Show of Force	DeZago/Buscema	Eric Fein/Bob Budiansky	Jan. 1996
233	Inner Demons	DeZago/Buscema	Eric Fein/Bob Budiansky	Feb. 1996
234	Leap of Faith	DeZago/Buscema	Ralph Macchio	March 1996
235	Puppets	DeZago/Buscema	Ralph Macchio	April 1996
236	Free Will	DeZago/Buscema	Ralph Macchio	May 1996
237	Little Deaths	DeZago/Buscema	Ralph Macchio	June 1996
238	Suicidal Tendencies	DeZago/Buscema	Ralph Macchio	July 1996
239	Sudden Sacrifices	DeZago/Luke Ross	Ralph Macchio	Aug. 1996
240	Walking Into Spiderwebs	DeZago/Ross	Ralph Macchio	Sept. 1996
241	A New Day Dawning	DeMatteis/Ross	Ralph Macchio	Oct. 1996
242	Facedancing	DeMatteis/Ross	Ralph Macchio	Nov. 1996
243	Who Am I?	DeMatteis/Ross	Ralph Macchio	Dec. 1996
244	Backlash	DeMatteis/Ross	Ralph Macchio	Jan. 1997
245	Kravinov's Revenge	DeMatteis/Ross	Ralph Macchio	Feb. 1997
246	The Legion of Losers!	DeMatteis/Glenn Greenberg/Ross	Ralph Macchio	March 1997
247	Mad Jack	DeMatteis/Ross	Ralph Macchio	April 1997
-1	That Thompson Boy!	DeMatteis/Ross	Ralph Macchio	May 1997
248	From the Shadows	DeMatteis/Mark Bernardo/Ross	Ralph Macchio	June 1997
249	Into the Light	Bernardo/Ross	Ralph Macchio	July 1997
250	Osborn Citizen	DeMatteis/Ross	Ralph Macchio	Aug. 1997
251	Son of the Hunter!	DeMatteis/Ross	Ralph Macchio	Sept. 1997
252	Son of the Hunter! Part 2	DeMatteis/Mike Deodato, Jr.	Ralph Macchio	Oct. 1997
253	Son of the Hunter! Part 3	DeMatteis/Ross	Ralph Macchio	Nov. 1997
254	Angst!	DeFalco/Ross	Ralph Macchio	Dec. 1997
255	Something Goblin This Way Comes	DeFalco/DeMatteis/Ross	Ralph Macchio	Jan. 1998
256	Through the Looking Glass	DeMatteis/Ross	Ralph Macchio	Feb. 1998
257	Prodigy	DeMatteis/Ross	Ralph Macchio	March 1998
258	Man of the People	Greenberg/DeMatteis/Ross	Ralph Macchio	April 1998
259	Survivor of the Big Lie!	Greenberg/Roger Stern/Ross	Ralph Macchio	May 1998
260	Spider in the Middle	Greenberg/Stern/Ross	Ralph Macchio	June 1998
261	Bad Business	Greenberg/Stern/Ross	Ralph Macchio	July 1998
262	The Gathering of Five Part 4 of 5: A Day in the Life	John Byrne/Ross	Ralph Macchio	Aug. 1998
263	The Final Chapter Part 3 of 4: The Triumph of the Goblin	Howard Mackie/Ross	Ralph Macchio	Sept. 1998

== The Spectacular Spider-Man #264-290 (July 2003 – April 2005) ==
=== The Spectacular Spider-Man Vol. 2 #1–27 (July 2003 – April 2005) ===
Issue #	Title	Author / Illustrator	Editor	Release date
1 | 264	The Hunger: Part 1 of 5	Paul Jenkins/Humberto Ramos	John Miesegaes	July 2003
2 | 265	The Hunger: Part 2 of 5	Jenkins/Ramos	John Miesegaes	July 2003
3 | 266	The Hunger: Part 3 of 5	Jenkins/Ramos	John Miesegaes	Aug. 2003
4 | 267	The Hunger: Part 4 of 5	Jenkins/Ramos	John Miesegaes	Sept. 2003
5 | 268	The Hunger: Conclusion	Jenkins/Ramos	John Miesegaes	Oct. 2003
6 | 269	Countdown: Part 1 of 5	Jenkins/Ramos	John Miesegaes	Nov. 2003
7 | 270	Countdown: Part 2 of 5	Jenkins/Ramos	John Miesegaes	Nov. 2003
8 | 271	Countdown: Part 3 of 5	Jenkins/Ramos	Tom Brevoort/John Miesegaes	Dec. 2003
9 | 272	Countdown: Part 4 of 5	Jenkins/Ramos	Tom Brevoort/John Miesegaes	Jan. 2004
10 | 273	Countdown: Conclusion	Jenkins/Ramos	Tom Brevoort/John Miesegaes	Feb. 2004
11 | 274	The Lizard's Tale: Part 1 of 3	Jenkins/Damion Scott	John Miesegaes/Axel Alonso/Tom Brevoort	March 2004
12 | 275	The Lizard's Tale: Part 2 of 3	Jenkins/Scott	John Miesegaes/Axel Alonso/Tom Brevoort	March 2004
13 | 276	The Lizard's Tale: Conclusion	Jenkins/Scott	John Miesegaes/Axel Alonso/Tom Brevoort	April 2004
14 | 277	Here There Be Monsters	Jenkins/Paolo Rivera	Tom Brevoort	May 2004
15 | 278	Under My Skin: Part 1 of 2	Jenkins/Michael Ryan	Tom Brevoort	June 2004
16 | 279	Under My Skin: Conclusion	Jenkins/Ryan	Tom Brevoort	June 2004
17 | 280	Changes: Part 1 of 4	Jenkins/Ramos	Tom Brevoort	July 2004
18 | 281	Changes: Part 2 of 4	Jenkins/Ramos	Tom Brevoort	Aug. 2004
19 | 282	Changes: Part 3 of 4	Jenkins/Ramos	Tom Brevoort	Sept. 2004
20 | 283	Changes: Conclusion	Jenkins/Ramos	Tom Brevoort	Oct. 2004
21 | 284	Read 'Em An' Weep	Jenkins/Talent Caldwell	Tom Brevoort	Nov. 2004
22 | 285	The Infernal Triangle	Jenkins/Caldwell	Tom Brevoort	Dec. 2004
23 | 286	Sins Remembered: Sarah's Story: Part 1 of 4	Sara Barnes/Scot Eaton	Tom Brevoort	Jan. 2005
24 | 287	Sins Remembered: Sarah's Story: Part 2 of 4	Barnes/Eaton	Tom Brevoort	Jan. 2005
25 | 288	Sins Remembered: Sarah's Story: Part 3 of 4	Barnes/Eaton	Tom Brevoort	Feb. 2005
26 | 289	Sins Remembered: Sarah's Story: Conclusion	Barnes/Eaton	Tom Brevoort	March 2005
27 | 290	The Final Curtain	Jenkins/Mark Buckingham	Andy Schmidt/Stuart Moore/Molly Lazer/Tom Brevoort	April 2005

== Peter Parker: The Spectacular Spider-Man #291–313 (June 2017 – December 2018) ==
=== Peter Parker: The Spectacular Spider-Man Vol. 3 #1–6 (June 2017 – November 2017) ===
Issue #	Title	Author / Illustrator	Editor	Release date
1 | 291	Spider-Fight	Chip Zdarsky/Adam Kubert/Goran Parlov	Nick Lowe/Allison Stock/Devin Lewis	June 2017
2 | 292	Sister Act!	Zdarsky/Kubert	Nick Lowe/Allison Stock/Devin Lewis	July 2017
3 | 293	Fisk-y Business	Zdarsky/Kubert	Nick Lowe/Allison Stock/Devin Lewis	Aug. 2017
4 | 294	Tinkered Tailored: Soldier Guy!	Zdarsky/Kubert	Nick Lowe/Allison Stock/Devin Lewis	Sept. 2017
5 | 295	Flight Risk	Zdarsky/Kubert	Nick Lowe/Allison Stock/Devin Lewis	Oct. 2017
6 | 296	My Dinner with Jonah	Zdarsky/Michael Walsh	Nick Lowe/Allison Stock/Devin Lewis	Nov. 2017

=== Peter Parker: The Spectacular Spider-Man #297–313 (November 2017 – December 2018) ===
Issue #	Title	Author / Illustrator	Editor	Release date
297	Find a Way	Chip Zdarsky/Adam Kubert/Juan Frigeri	Nick Lowe/Allison Stock/Devin Lewis	Nov. 2017
298	Escape Plans	Zdarsky/Kubert/Frigeri	Nick Lowe/Allison Stock/Thomas Groneman/Devin Lewis	Dec. 2017
299	Desperate Measures	Zdarsky/Kubert/Frigeri	Nick Lowe/Allison Stock/Thomas Groneman/Devin Lewis	Jan. 2018
300	Showdown; The Canary	Zdarsky/Kubert/Goran Parlov	Nick Lowe/Thomas Groneman/Devin Lewis	Feb. 2018
301	Amazing Fantasy – Part One	Zdarsky/Joe Quinones	Nick Lowe/Thomas Groneman/Devin Lewis	March 2018
302	Amazing Fantasy – Part Two	Zdarsky/Quinones	Nick Lowe/Thomas Groneman/Devin Lewis	March 2018
303	Amazing Fantasy – Part Three	Zdarsky/Quinones	Nick Lowe/Thomas Groneman/Devin Lewis	April 2018
304	No More – Part One	Zdarsky/Kubert	Nick Lowe/Thomas Groneman/Kathleen Wisneski/Devin Lewis	May 2018
305	No More – Part Two	Zdarsky/Kubert	Nick Lowe/Kathleen Wisneski	June 2018
306	Coming Home – Part One	Zdarsky/Kubert/Frigeri	Nick Lowe/Kathleen Wisneski	June 2018
307	No More – Part Four	Zdarsky/Kubert/Frigeri	Nick Lowe/Kathleen Wisneski	July 2018
308	Cracked Hourglass – Part One	Zdarsky/Chris Bachalo	Nick Lowe/Kathleen Wisneski	Aug. 2018
309	Cracked Hourglass – Part Two	Zdarsky/Bachalo	Nick Lowe/Kathleen Wisneski	Sept. 2018
310	Finale	Zdarsky	Nick Lowe/Kathleen Wisneski	Sept. 2018
311	Spider-Geddon	Sean Ryan/Frigeri	Nick Lowe/Kathleen Wisneski	Oct. 2018
312	Spider-Geddon	Ryan/Frigeri	Nick Lowe/Kathleen Wisneski	Nov. 2018
313	Spider-Geddon	Ryan/Frigeri	Nick Lowe/Kathleen Wisneski	Dec. 2018

== The Spectacular Spider-Man Annuals ==
- 1 – [Mantlo/Buckler] "And Men Shall Call Him... Octopus!" – September 1979
- 2 – [Macchio/Mooney] "Vengeance Is Mine... Sayeth the Word!" – May 1980
- 3 – [Kraft/Sherman/Weiss] "Dark Side of the Moon" – July 1981
- 4 – [DeNatale/Mantlo] "Memory Lane!" – July 1984
- 5 – [David/Beachum] "Ace" – July 1985
- 6 – [David/Beachum] "Ace II" – July 1986
- 7 – [Owsley/Kupperberg] "The Honeymoon" – August 1987
- 8 – [Conway/Gruenwald] "Return to Sender" – July 1988
- 9 – [Conway/Herdling] "The Serpent in the Shadow" – May 1989
- 10 – [Conway/Lee] "Into the Microverse" – June 1990
- 11 – [Conway/Hembeck] "The Ghost and the Machine" – June 1991
- 12 – [Brevoort/Fein] "Down and Downer" – June 1992
- 13 – [DeMatteis/Bingham] "Emergence" – July 1993
- 14 – [DeMatteis/Buscema] "Cycles & Circles" – July 1994
- 1 – [Zdarksy/Allred] "Paper Trail" – June 2018

== Other issues ==
- Spectacular Spider-Man Super Special (1995) #1 – [Kavanagh/Lee] Part of the Planet of the Symbiotes storyline.

== See also ==
- List of Spider-Man titles
