= Walter Michaels =

Walter Michaels may refer to:

- Walter Benn Michaels, American literary theorist and author
- Walt Michaels, American football player and coach
- Dr. Walter Michaels, alter ego Thermo (comics), a Marvel Comics character
