= Truth or Consequences (disambiguation) =

Truth or Consequences is an American radio and television quiz show.

Truth or Consequences may also refer to:

== Television episodes ==
- "Truth or Consequences" (All Grown Up!)
- "Truth or Consequences" (Lie to Me)
- "Truth or Consequences" (NCIS)
- "Truth or Consequences" (Popular)
- "Truth or Consequences" (Supergirl)

== Other uses ==
- Truth or Consequences, New Mexico, a city renamed for the quiz show
- Truth or Consequences, N.M. (film), a 1997 film
- Truth or Consequences Hot Springs
- "Truth or Consequences", a Zygon terrorist organization featured in Doctor Who

== See also ==
- Truth and Consequences (disambiguation)
- Truth and Consequence, a Swedish film
