= Marvel Team-Up =

Marvel Comics team-up series

- Cover of Marvel Team-Up #1 (March 1972). Art by Gil Kane and Frank Giacoia.

Publication information
- Publisher: Marvel Comics
- Schedule: Marvel Team-Up (all): monthly Spider-Man Team-Up: quarterly
- Format: Ongoing
- Publication date: Marvel Team-Up : March 1972–February 1985; Spider-Man Team-Up: December 1995–June 1997; Marvel Team-Up (vol. 2): September 1997–July 1998; Marvel Team-Up (vol. 3): January 2005–December 2006; Marvel Team-Up (vol. 4): June 2019–present
- No. of issues: Marvel Team-Up (vol. 1): 150 and 7 Annuals; Spider-Man Team-Up: 7 Marvel Team-Up (vol. 2): 11; Marvel Team-Up (vol. 3): 25; Marvel Team-Up (vol. 4): 6
- Main character: Spider-Man

Creative team
- Written by: List: Mike Carlin, Chris Claremont, J. M. DeMatteis (101, 111–112, 114–133), Gerry Conway, Bill Mantlo (38–51, 53–56, 72, 134–135, 140, Annual #1, 6), Louise Simonson (149–150, Annual #7), Roy Thomas Len Wein
- Penciller: List: Ross Andru Sal Buscema John Byrne Bob Hall Gil Kane Greg LaRocque Frank Miller Jim Mooney Ron Wilson
- Inker: List: Terry Austin Mike Esposito

Marvel Team-Up is an American comic book series published by Marvel Comics. The series featured two or more Marvel characters in one story. The series was originally published from March 1972 through February 1985, and featured Spider-Man as the lead "team-up" character in all but ten of its 150 issues, and in six of its seven Annuals. It was the first major ongoing spin-off series for Spider-Man, being preceded only by the short-lived The Spectacular Spider-Man magazine. Of the issues that did not star Spider-Man, the Human Torch headlines six issues (#18, 23, 26, 29, 32, 35); the Hulk, four (#97, 104, 105, and Annual #3); and Aunt May, one (#137). Publication of most of the issues starring the Human Torch coincided with that of Giant-Size Spider-Man, an alternate Spider-Man "team-up"-themed series by the regular Marvel Team-Up creative team. When cancelled with #150 in 1985, the title was replaced by Web of Spider-Man.

The second series was published for 11 issues from September 1997 through July 1998 and originally featured Spider-Man; Namor the Sub-Mariner was the featured character starting with #8. From 1995 to 1997, a quarterly series titled Spider-Man Team-Up fulfilled much the same purpose as the original title. The third Marvel Team-Up series, written by Robert Kirkman, began publication in January 2005 and frequently featured Spider-Man. This volume often reintroduced lesser-known Marvel characters that had fallen into obscurity, in addition to featuring a crossover with Kirkman's Image Universe series Invincible, which in 2024 would be adapted (albeit with a Spider-Man analogue in place of Spider-Man due to legal restrictions) to the television series adaptation's second season.

The spirit of Marvel Team-Up was carried on by Avenging Spider-Man and later by Superior Spider-Man Team-Up.

== Publication history ==
Comics journalist Jonathan Miller summarized Marvel Team-Up in a retrospective article:

The series was admittedly formulaic; either Spider-Man or that issue's guest-star would encounter a menace and then by sheer chance cross paths with another hero who would lend a hand. The title's guest-stars were an equal mix of A-list characters whose presence was likely to increase sales and fledgling heroes being given exposure in the hopes of launching them into stardom but who for the most part continued to languish in obscurity.

The series debuted with a March 1972 cover-dated issue featuring Spider-Man and the Human Torch in a story by writer Roy Thomas and artist Ross Andru. Spider-Man and the Human Torch were originally the permanent headliners on the series, but the creators found this format limiting, and after just three issues the Human Torch was dropped in favor of a rotating co-star slot. The main artists on the series for the first several years were Andru, Gil Kane, Sal Buscema, and Jim Mooney.

In 1974, Marvel started publishing Giant-Size Spider-Man, which was a quarterly 68-page comic that lasted for six issues which complemented Marvel Team-Up. The series featured team-ups, with each issue featuring a new story with a back-up reprint, except the last issue, which only featured a reprint.

Due to the limitations of the typically single-issue team-up stories, the supporting cast of Spider-Man's other titles rarely appeared in Marvel Team-Up. The series often featured non-superhero characters in the co-star slot. A multi-issue time travel story arc began in issue #41 with Spider-Man and the Scarlet Witch traveling to the Salem witch trials in 1692, and pushed the barriers of continuity by having Spider-Man team up with two characters who had no established connection to the mainstream Marvel Universe, Killraven and Deathlok. Though the series did often team Spider-Man with other highly popular characters, it regularly gave the co-star slot to obscure characters that the average reader was unlikely to even recognize, particularly during writer J. M. DeMatteis's run. DeMatteis recounted, "I was always attracted to the more obscure characters, mainly because they were ripe for exploration. You could crack them open and really develop them. ... I just looked at these fringe characters as more inviting than the mainstream, more established characters – who all had their set-in-stone continuity. I wanted room to play and those characters gave me all the room I wanted. And let's face it, our lead character was as mainstream as you can get, so the obscure ones made for a nice contrast."

With issue #47, the series had a crossover with Marvel Two-in-One #17, which featured the Thing. Jean DeWolff was introduced as a supporting character in the Spider-Man/Iron Man story in issue #48.

John Byrne, who would later become the artist on The Uncanny X-Men, first drew the characters in Marvel Team-Up #53. Byrne and his Uncanny X-Men collaborator, writer Chris Claremont worked together on several issues of Marvel Team-Up. Captain Britain, a character created for Marvel UK, made his first appearance in an American comic book in Marvel Team-Up #65 (January 1978).

Karma, a character that later joined the New Mutants, was created by Claremont and artist Frank Miller in #100's lead story. A photo cover by Eliot R. Brown was used for the Spider-Man/Captain America team-up in issue #128.

Though published for well over a decade, the series format never truly caught on with readers. Upon taking a serious look at sales figures for Marvel Team-Up, Marvel's editorial staff found that sales dramatically rose or fell with each issue depending solely on the popularity of that issue's co-star. Taking this into consideration, Marvel editor-in-chief Jim Shooter concluded that it would make more sense to have another Spider-Man solo series with guest stars appearing when the storyline and/or promotional needs called for it, rather than a team-up series which unnaturally forced guest-stars upon the story. The series ended with issue #150 (February 1985), to be replaced by Web of Spider-Man.

A Hulk and the Human Torch story written by Jack C. Harris and drawn by Steve Ditko in the 1980s that was intended for Marvel Team-Up was published by Marvel as Incredible Hulk and the Human Torch: From the Marvel Vault #1 in August 2011.

Spider-Man Team-Up was a brief attempt to revive the concept of the series and was soon followed by Marvel Team-Up vol. 2 which was published from September 1997 to July 1998. The third Marvel Team-Up series launched in January 2005 and ran for 25 issues which starred a variety of characters. The fourth series began with a June 2019 cover date and contains legacy numbering.

== Marvel Team-Up (1972–1985) ==
Issue	Character(s)	Marvel Omnibus	Marvel Essentials	Marvel Masterworks	Other Collections
#1	Spider-Man and the Human Torch vs. Sandman	Vol 1	Vol 1	Vol 1	
#2	Spider-Man and the Human Torch vs. the Frightful Four (Wizard, Sandman, Trapster) and Annihilus	Vol 1	Vol 1	Vol 1	
#3	Spider-Man and the Human Torch vs. Morbius and Bert Tracker	Vol 1	Vol 1	Vol 1	Morbius Epic Collection Vol 1; Morbius Omnibus Vol 1
#4	Spider-Man and the X-Men (Angel, Cyclops, Iceman, and Marvel Girl) vs. Morbius	Vol 1	Vol 1	Vol 1	Morbius Epic Collection Vol 1; Morbius Omnibus Vol 1; X-Men Epic Collection Vol 4
#5	Spider-Man and the Vision vs. Puppet Master and Ballox the Monstroid	Vol 1	Vol 1	Vol 1	
#6	Spider-Man and the Thing vs. Mad Thinker	Vol 1	Vol 1	Vol 1	
#7	Spider-Man and Thor vs Kryllk the Cruel	Vol 1	Vol 1	Vol 1	
#8	Spider-Man and Cat vs. Man-Killer and A.I.M.	Vol 1	Vol 1	Vol 1	Tigra: The Complete Collection; Women of Marvel: Celebrating Seven Decades Omnibus
#9	Spider-Man and Iron Man vs. Zarrko the Tomorrow Man and Kang the Conqueror	Vol 1	Vol 1	Vol 1	Spider-Man/Iron Man: Marvel Team-Up
#10	Spider-Man and Human Torch vs. Zarrko and Kang	Vol 1	Vol 1	Vol 1	Spider-Man/Iron Man: Marvel Team-Up
#11	Spider-Man and the Inhumans (Black Bolt, Gorgon, Karnak, and Triton) vs. Zarrko and Kang	Vol 1	Vol 1	Vol 1	Spider-Man/Iron Man: Marvel Team-Up
#12	Spider-Man and Werewolf by Night vs. Moondark	Vol 1	Vol 1	Vol 2	Werewolf By Night: The Complete Collection Vol 1; Werewolf By Night Omnibus Vol 1
#13	Spider-Man and Captain America vs. Grey Gargoyle and A.I.M.	Vol 1	Vol 1	Vol 2	
#14	Spider-Man and Namor vs. Tiger Shark, Lemuel Dorcas, and the Aquanoids	Vol 1	Vol 1	Vol 2	
#15	Spider-Man and Ghost Rider vs. Orb	Vol 1	Vol 1	Vol 2	Ghost Rider Epic Collection Vol 1
#16	Spider-Man and Captain Marvel vs. Basilisk	Vol 1	Vol 1	Vol 2	
#17	Spider-Man and Mister Fantastic vs. Mole Man and Basilisk	Vol 1	Vol 1	Vol 2	
#18	Human Torch and Hulk vs. Blastaar, Paxton Pentecost, and Ferguson Blaine	Vol 1	Vol 1	Vol 2	
#19	Spider-Man and Ka-Zar vs. Stegron	Vol 1	Vol 1	Vol 2	
#20	Spider-Man and Black Panther vs. Stegron	Vol 1	Vol 1	Vol 2	Black Panther: The Early Years Omnibus
#21	Spider-Man and Doctor Strange vs. Xandu	Vol 1	Vol 1	Vol 2	
#22	Spider-Man and Hawkeye vs. Quasimodo	Vol 1	Vol 1	Vol 2	Hawkeye Epic Collection Vol 1
#23	Human Torch and Iceman vs. Equinox	Vol 1	Vol 1	Vol 3	X-Men Epic Collection Vol 4
#24	Spider-Man and Brother Voodoo vs. Moondog the Malicious	Vol 1	Vol 1	Vol 3	Marvel Horror Omnibus
#25	Spider-Man and Daredevil vs. Ani-Men	Vol 1	Vol 2	Vol 3	
#26	Human Torch and Thor vs. the Lava Men of Subterranea	Vol 1	Vol 2	Vol 3	
#27	Spider-Man and Hulk vs. Chameleon	Vol 1	Vol 2	Vol 3	
#28	Spider-Man and Hercules vs. the City Stealers	Vol 1	Vol 2	Vol 3	
#29	Human Torch and Iron Man vs. Infinitus the Reincarnated Man	Vol 1	Vol 2	Vol 3	
#30	Spider-Man and Falcon vs. Midas	Vol 1	Vol 2	Vol 3	
#31	Spider-Man and Iron Fist vs. Drom the Backwards Man	Vol 2	Vol 2	Vol 4	
#32	Human Torch and Son of Satan vs. Dryminextes	Vol 2	Vol 2	Vol 4	The Son of Satan Classic
#33	Spider-Man and Nighthawk vs. Meteor Man and Jeremiah	Vol 2	Vol 2	Vol 4	
#34	Spider-Man and Valkyrie vs. Meteor Man and Jeremiah	Vol 2	Vol 2	Vol 4	
#35	Human Torch and Doctor Strange vs. Jeremiah and Orothu	Vol 2	Vol 2	Vol 4	
#36	Spider-Man and the Frankenstein Monster vs. Baron Ludwig von Shtupf the Monster-Maker	Vol 2	Vol 2	Vol 4	Man-Wolf Complete Collection
#37	Spider-Man, the Frankenstein Monster and the Man-Wolf vs. Baron Ludwig von Shtupf the Monster-Maker	Vol 2	Vol 2	Vol 4	Man-Wolf Complete Collection
#38	Spider-Man and Beast vs. Griffin	Vol 2	Vol 2	Vol 4	
#39	Spider-Man and Human Torch vs Big Man (Janice Foswell), Crime Master, Fancy Dan, Montana, and Sandman	Vol 2	Vol 2	Vol 4	
#40	Spider-Man and the Sons of the Tiger vs. Big Man (Janice Foswell), Crime Master, Fancy Dan, Montana, and Sandman	Vol 2	Vol 2	Vol 4	
#41	Spider-Man and Scarlet Witch vs. Cotton Mather	Vol 2	Vol 2	Vol 5	
#42	Spider-Man and Vision vs. Cotton Mather and Dark Rider	Vol 2	Vol 2	Vol 5	
#43	Spider-Man and Doctor Doom vs. Dark Rider	Vol 2	Vol 2	Vol 5	
#44	Spider-Man and Moondragon vs. Dark Rider	Vol 2	Vol 2	Vol 5	
#45	Spider-Man and Killraven vs. minions of the Martian masters	Vol 2	Vol 2	Vol 5	Killraven Epic Collection Vol 1
#46	Spider-Man and Deathlok vs. the Cubists, Strake, and Grisson	Vol 2	Vol 2	Vol 5	Deathlok the Demolisher
#47	Spider-Man and Thing vs. Basilisk	Vol 2	Vol 2	Vol 5	Marvel Two-in-One Epic Collection Vol 1
#48	Spider-Man and Iron Man vs. Wraith	Vol 2	Vol 2	Vol 5	Spider-Man/Iron Man: Marvel Team-Up
#49	Spider-Man and Iron Man vs. Wraith	Vol 2	Vol 2	Vol 5	Spider-Man/Iron Man: Marvel Team-Up
#50	Spider-Man and Doctor Strange vs. Wraith	Vol 2	Vol 2	Vol 5	Spider-Man/Iron Man: Marvel Team-Up
#51	Spider-Man and Iron Man vs. Wraith	Vol 2	Vol 2	Vol 5	Spider-Man/Iron Man: Marvel Team-Up
#52	Spider-Man and Captain America vs. Batroc the Leaper	Vol 2	Vol 3	Vol 5	
#53	Spider-Man and Hulk vs. Major Del Tremens (featuring the X-Men)	Vol 2	Vol 3	Vol 6	X-Men Epic Collection Vol 5; Spider-Man by John Byrne Omnibus
#54	Spider-Man and Hulk vs. Major Del Tremens	Vol 2	Vol 3	Vol 6	Spider-Man by John Byrne Omnibus
#55	Spider-Man and Adam Warlock vs. Stranger	Vol 2	Vol 3	Vol 6	Adam Warlock Omnibus Vol 1; Thanos Wars: Infinity Origins Omnibus; Spider-Man by John Byrne Omnibus
#56	Spider-Man and Daredevil vs. Electro and Blizzard	Vol 2	Vol 3	Vol 6	
#57	Spider-Man and Black Widow vs. Silver Samurai	Vol 2	Vol 3	Vol 6	
#58	Spider-Man and Ghost Rider vs. Trapster	Vol 2	Vol 3	Vol 6	Ghost Rider Epic Collection Vol 2: The Salvation Run
#59	Spider-Man, Yellowjacket and Wasp vs. Equinox	Vol 2	Vol 3	Vol 6	Spider-Man by John Byrne Omnibus; Spider-Man: Marvel Team-Up by Claremont & Byrne
#60	Spider-Man and Wasp vs. Equinox	Vol 2	Vol 3	Vol 6	The Fantastic Four by John Byrne Omnibus Vol 1; Spider-Man by John Byrne Omnibus; Spider-Man: Marvel Team-Up by Claremont & Byrne
#61	Spider-Man and Human Torch vs. Super-Skrull	Vol 2	Vol 3	Vol 6	The Fantastic Four by John Byrne Omnibus Vol 1; Ms. Marvel Epic Collection Vol 1; Captain Marvel: Ms Marvel – A Hero Is Born Omnibus; Spider-Man by John Byrne Omnibus; Spider-Man: Marvel Team-Up by Claremont & Byrne
#62	Spider-Man and Ms. Marvel vs. Super-Skrull	Vol 2	Vol 3	Vol 6	Ms. Marvel Epic Collection Vol 1; Captain Marvel: Ms Marvel – A Hero Is Born Omnibus; Spider-Man by John Byrne Omnibus; Spider-Man: Marvel Team-Up by Claremont & Byrne
#63	Spider-Man and Iron Fist vs. Steel Serpent	Vol 2	Vol 3	Vol 6	Iron Fist Epic Collection Vol 1; Iron Fist: Danny Rand – The Early Years Omnibus; Marvel Universe by John Byrne Omnibus; Spider-Man by John Byrne Omnibus; Spider-Man: Marvel Team-Up by Claremont & Byrne
#64	Spider-Man and the Daughters of the Dragon vs. Steel Serpent	Vol 2	Vol 3	Vol 6	Iron Fist Epic Collection Vol 1; Iron Fist: Danny Rand – The Early Years Omnibus; Marvel Universe by John Byrne Omnibus; Spider-Man by John Byrne Omnibus; Spider-Man: Marvel Team-Up by Claremont & Byrne
#65	Spider-Man and Captain Britain vs. Arcade		Vol 3	Vol 7	Captain Britain Omnibus; Spider-Man by John Byrne Omnibus; Spider-Man: Marvel Team-Up by Claremont & Byrne
#66	Spider-Man and Captain Britain vs. Arcade		Vol 3	Vol 7	Captain Britain Omnibus; Spider-Man by John Byrne Omnibus; Spider-Man: Marvel Team-Up by Claremont & Byrne
#67	Spider-Man and Tigra vs. Kraven the Hunter		Vol 3	Vol 7	Tigra: The Complete Collection; Spider-Man by John Byrne Omnibus; Spider-Man: Marvel Team-Up by Claremont & Byrne
#68	Spider-Man and Man-Thing vs. D'Spayre		Vol 3	Vol 7	The Man-Thing Omnibus; Spider-Man by John Byrne Omnibus; Spider-Man: Marvel Team-Up by Claremont & Byrne
#69	Spider-Man and Havok vs. Living Pharaoh		Vol 3	Vol 7	X-Men Epic Collection Vol 5; Spider-Man by John Byrne Omnibus; Spider-Man: Marvel Team-Up by Claremont & Byrne
#70	Spider-Man and Thor vs. Living Monolith		Vol 3	Vol 7	X-Men Epic Collection Vol 5; Spider-Man by John Byrne Omnibus; Spider-Man: Marvel Team-Up by Claremont & Byrne
#71	Spider-Man and Falcon vs. Plantman		Vol 3	Vol 7	
#72	Spider-Man and Iron Man vs. Whiplash		Vol 3	Vol 7	Spider-Man/Iron Man: Marvel Team-Up
#73	Spider-Man and Daredevil vs. Owl		Vol 3	Vol 7	
#74	Spider-Man and the Not Ready For Prime Time Players (Dan Aykroyd, John Belushi, Jane Curtin, Garrett Morris, Bill Murray, Laraine Newman, and Gilda Radner) vs. Silver Samurai		Not Collected	Vol 7	
#75	Spider-Man and Power Man vs. Rat Pack and Arson Gang		Vol 3	Vol 7	Spider-Man: Marvel Team-Up by Claremont & Byrne
#76	Spider-Man and Doctor Strange vs. Silver Dagger		Vol 4	Vol 7	Ms. Marvel Epic Collection Vol 2; Captain Marvel: Ms Marvel – A Hero Is Born Omnibus
#77	Spider-Man and Ms. Marvel vs. Silver Dagger		Vol 4	Vol 7	Ms. Marvel Epic Collection Vol 2; Captain Marvel: Ms Marvel – A Hero Is Born Omnibus
#78	Spider-Man and Wonder Man vs. Griffin		Vol 4	Vol 8	Wonder Man: The Early Years Omnibus
#79	Spider-Man and Mary Jane Watson as Red Sonja vs. Kulan Gath		Not Collected	tbc	
#80	Spider-Man and Clea vs. Werewolf Doctor Strange		Vol 4	Vol 8	Marvel Horror Lives Again! Omnibus
#81	Spider-Man, Satana, and Clea vs. Werewolf Doctor Strange and Basilisk Demon		Vol 4	Vol 8	Marvel Horror Lives Again! Omnibus
#82	Spider-Man and Black Widow vs. S.H.I.E.L.D. agents and some muggers		Vol 4	Vol 8	
#83	Spider-Man and Nick Fury vs. Boomerang, Silver Samurai, and Viper		Vol 4	Vol 8	Wolverine: First Cuts
#84	Spider-Man and Shang-Chi vs. Boomerang and Silver Samurai		Vol 4	Vol 8	Wolverine: First Cuts
#85	Spider-Man, Shang-Chi, Black Widow, and Nick Fury vs. Silver Samurai		Vol 4	Vol 8	Wolverine: First Cuts
#86	Spider-Man and Guardians of the Galaxy vs. Hammer and Anvil		Vol 4	Vol 8	Guardians of the Galaxy Epic Collection Vol 2; Guardians of the Galaxy: Tomorrow's Heroes Omnibus
#87	Spider-Man and Black Panther vs. Hellrazor		Vol 4	Vol 8	
#88	Spider-Man and Invisible Girl vs. Boss Morgan and the Hole in the Wall Gang		Vol 4	Vol 8	
#89	Spider-Man and Nightcrawler vs. Cutthroat		Vol 4	Vol 8	X-Men Epic Collection Vol 6
#90	Spider-Man and Beast vs. Killer Shrike and Modular Man		Vol 4	Vol 8	
#91	Spider-Man and Ghost Rider vs. Soul-Stealer		Vol 4	Vol 9	Ghost Rider Epic Collection Vol 3: Death Race
#92	Spider-Man and Hawkeye vs. Mister Fear		Vol 4	Vol 9	Hawkeye Epic Collection Vol 1
#93	Spider-Man and Werewolf by Night vs. Dansen Macabre and Tatterdemalion		Vol 4	Vol 9	Werewolf By Night: The Complete Collection Vol 3
#94	Spider-Man and Shroud vs. Dansen Macabre		Vol 4	Vol 9	
#95	Spider-Man and Mockingbird vs. Carl Delandan of S.H.I.E.L.D.		Vol 4	Vol 9	Hawkeye Epic Collection Vol 1
#96	Spider-Man and Howard the Duck vs. Status Quo		Vol 4	Vol 9	Howard the Duck Complete Collection Vol 4; Howard the Duck Omnibus
#97	Hulk and Spider-Woman vs. Doc Benway		Vol 4	Vol 9	
#98	Spider-Man and Black Widow vs. Owl		Vol 4	Vol 9	
#99	Spider-Man and Machine Man vs. Baron Brimstone and Sandman		Not Collected	Vol 9	
#100	Spider-Man and the Fantastic Four vs. Karma; Black Panther and Storm vs Klaw		Not Collected	Vol 9	New Mutants Epic Collection Vol 1, New Mutants Omnibus Vol 1; The Uncanny X-Men Omnibus Vol 2; Marvel Universe by Frank Miller Omnibus; Fantastic Four/Spider-Man Classic Second Story: Black Panther Epic Collection Vol 2; Black Panther Omnibus: Revenge of the Black Panther; X-Men Epic Collection Vol 7; Marvel Universe by John Byrne Omnibus
#101	Spider-Man and Nighthawk vs. Mindy Williams		Not Collected		Defenders Epic Collection Vol 6; Essential Defenders Vol 5
#102	Spider-Man and Doc Samson vs. Rhino		Not Collected		
#103	Spider-Man and Ant-Man vs. Taskmaster		Not Collected		
#104	Hulk and Ka-Zar vs. MODOK		Not Collected		
#105	The Hulk, Power Man, and Iron Fist vs. Pa and Luther		Not Collected		
#106	Spider-Man and Captain America vs. Scorpion		Not Collected		
#107	Spider-Man and She-Hulk vs. Man-Killer		Not Collected		
#108	Spider-Man and Paladin vs. Thermo		Not Collected		
#109	Spider-Man, Paladin, and Dazzler vs. Thermo		Not Collected		
#110	Spider-Man and Iron Man vs. Magma		Not Collected		Spider-Man/Iron Man: Marvel Team-Up
#111	Spider-Man, the Defenders, and Devil-Slayer vs. Spider-God		Not Collected		Kull the Conqueror: The Original Marvel Years Omnibus; Essential Defenders Vol 5
#112	Spider-Man and King Kull vs. Ju-Lak		Not Collected		Kull the Conqueror: The Original Marvel Years Omnibus
#113	Spider-Man and Quasar vs. Lightmaster		Not Collected		
#114	Spider-Man and Falcon vs. Stone-Face and Young Watchers		Not Collected		
#115	Spider-Man and Thor vs. Mind-Bender		Not Collected		
#116	Spider-Man, Thor, and Valkyrie vs. Mind-Bender and Shape-Changer		Not Collected		Essential Defenders Vol 5
#117	Spider-Man and Wolverine vs. Mentallo		Not Collected		
#118	Spider-Man and Professor X vs. Mentallo		Not Collected		
#119	Spider-Man and Gargoyle vs. some street thugs		Not Collected		Essential Defenders Vol 6
#120	Spider-Man and Dominic Fortune vs. Turner D. Century		Not Collected		
#121	Spider-Man and Human Torch vs. Speed Demon		Not Collected		
#122	Spider-Man and Man-Thing vs. Ian Fate		Not Collected		
#123	Spider-Man and Daredevil vs. Solarr		Not Collected		
#124	Spider-Man and Beast vs. Professor Power		Not Collected		
#125	Spider-Man and Tigra vs. Zabo Donalbain; Doctor Strange and Scarlet Witch vs. Beliath Demon		Not Collected		Tigra: The Complete Collection
#126	Power Man and Son of Satan vs. Satannish and Sons of Satannish; Spider-Man and Hulk vs. some street thugs		Not Collected		
#127	Spider-Man and Uatu the Watcher vs. Buck Todd		Not Collected		
#128	Spider-Man and Captain America vs. Vermin		Not Collected		
#129	Spider-Man and Vision vs. Mad Thinker's robots.		Not Collected		
#130	Spider-Man and the Scarlet Witch vs. Necrodamus		Not Collected		
#131	Spider-Man and Frog-Man vs. White Rabbit		Not Collected		
#132	Spider-Man and Mister Fantastic		Not Collected		Fantastic Four/Spider-Man Classic
#133	Spider-Man and the Fantastic Four vs. Doctor Faustus		Not Collected		Fantastic Four/Spider-Man Classic
#134	Spider-Man and Jack of Hearts vs. S.H.I.E.L.D. agents		Not Collected		Marvel Masterworks: The Invincible Iron Man Vol. 18
#135	Spider-Man and Kitty Pryde vs. the Morlocks		Not Collected		
#136	Spider-Man and Wonder Man vs. Mauler		Not Collected		Wonder Man: The Early Years Omnibus
#137	Aunt May and Franklin Richards vs. Galactus		Not Collected		
#138	Spider-Man and Sandman vs. the Enforcers		Not Collected		
#139	Spider-Man and Nick Fury vs. Dreadnaught		Not Collected		
#140	Spider-Man, Black Widow, and Daredevil vs. Howard "Cool Breeze" McNeal's gang		Not Collected		
#141	Spider-Man, Daredevil, and Black Widow vs. Kingpin and Frank Arnold		Not Collected		Spider-Man: The Complete Alien Costume Saga Vol 1; Spider-Man: The Black Costume Saga Omnibus
#142	Spider-Man and Captain Marvel vs. P.R.I.D.E.		Not Collected		Spider-Man: The Complete Alien Costume Saga Vol 1; Spider-Man: The Black Costume Saga Omnibus
#143	Spider-Man and Starfox vs. Will-Killer		Not Collected		Spider-Man: The Complete Alien Costume Saga Vol 1; Spider-Man: The Black Costume Saga Omnibus
#144	Spider-Man and Moon Knight vs. White Dragon		Not Collected		Moon Knight Epic Collection Vol 4; Moon Knight Omnibus Vol 2; Spider-Man: The Complete Alien Costume Saga Vol 1; Spider-Man: The Black Costume Saga Omnibus
#145	Spider-Man and Iron Man vs. Blacklash		Not Collected		Spider-Man/Iron Man: Marvel Team-Up; Spider-Man: The Complete Alien Costume Saga Vol 1; Spider-Man: The Black Costume Saga Omnibus
#146	Spider-Man and Nomad vs. Taskmaster and Black Abbott		Not Collected		Spider-Man: The Complete Alien Costume Saga Vol 2; Spider-Man: The Black Costume Saga Omnibus
#147	Spider-Man and Human Torch vs. Black Abbott		Not Collected		Spider-Man: The Complete Alien Costume Saga Vol 2; Spider-Man: The Black Costume Saga Omnibus
#148	Spider-Man and Thor vs. Black Abbott		Not Collected		Spider-Man: The Complete Alien Costume Saga Vol 2; Spider-Man: The Black Costume Saga Omnibus
#149	Spider-Man and Cannonball vs. Incandescent Man		Not Collected		New Mutants Omnibus Vol 1; Spider-Man: The Complete Alien Costume Saga Vol 2; Spider-Man: The Black Costume Saga Omnibus
#150	Spider-Man and the X-Men (Colossus, Nightcrawler, Rachel Summers, and Rogue) vs. Juggernaut and Black Tom Cassidy		Not Collected		Spider-Man and the Uncanny X-Men TPB (1996); Spider-Man: The Complete Alien Costume Saga Vol 2; Spider-Man: The Black Costume Saga Omnibus

=== Annuals (1976–1984) ===
Issue	Character(s)	Villain(s)	Marvel Omnibus	Marvel Essentials	Marvel Masterworks	Other Collections
#1	Spider-Man and the X-Men	Lords of Light and Darkness	Vol 2	Vol 3	Vol 6	X-Men Epic Collection Vol 5
#2	Spider-Man and Hulk	Nikolai Kutzov		Vol 4	Vol 8	
#3	Hulk, Power Man, Iron Fist, and Machine Man (Spider-Man cameo)	Nightshade		Vol 4	Vol 9	
#4	Spider-Man, Moon Knight, Iron Fist, Power Man, and Daredevil	Purple Man and Heinrich von Schnickelschnapp		Not Collected		Marvel Universe by Frank Miller Omnibus; Moon Knight Omnibus Vol 1
#5	Spider-Man, Thing, Scarlet Witch, Doctor Strange, and Quasar	Myron Wilburn (possessed by Set)		Not Collected		
#6	Spider-Man, Cloak and Dagger, and the New Mutants	Unnamed mobsters		Not Collected		Cloack and Dagger Omnibus Vol 1, New Mutants Omnibus Vol 1
#7	Spider-Man and Alpha Flight	Collector		Not Collected		Alpha Flight by John Byrne Omnibus; Spider-Man: The Black Costume Saga Omnibus; Spider-Man: The Complete Alien Costume Saga Vol 1

== Spider-Man Team-Up (1995–1997) ==
Issue	Main character	Other character(s)	Villain(s)	Collected in
#1	Spider-Man	X-Men (Angel, Beast, Cyclops, Jean Grey, Psylocke)	White Knights of the Hellfire Club	Spider-Man: The Complete Clone Saga Epic Vol. 5; Spider-Man: The Clone Saga Omnibus Vol 2
#2	Spider-Man (Ben Reilly)	Silver Surfer	Mad Thinker, Quasimodo, Thanos	Spider-Man: The Complete Ben Reilly Epic Vol 3; Spider-Man: Ben Reilly Omnibus Vol 1
#3	Spider-Man (Ben Reilly)	Fantastic Four	Rasheed Ven Garmchee	Spider-Man: The Complete Ben Reilly Epic Vol 4; Spider-Man: Ben Reilly Omnibus Vol 1
#4	Spider-Man (Ben Reilly)	Avengers (Hawkeye, Black Widow, Scarlet Witch, Iron Man, Giant-Man, Wasp, Thor, Captain America, Quicksilver, Crystal)	Spider-Man Robot	Spider-Man: The Complete Ben Reilly Epic Vol 5; Spider-Man: Ben Reilly Omnibus Vol 2
#5	Spider-Man (Ben Reilly)	Gambit and Howard the Duck	Circus of Crime (Ringmaster, Clown, Great Gambonnos, Human Cannonball, Princess Python), and Tombstone	Spider-Man: The Complete Ben Reilly Epic Vol 6; Spider-Man: Ben Reilly Omnibus Vol 2; Howard the Duck Complete Collection Vol 4
#6	Spider-Man	Hulk, Doctor Strange, Aquarian, Dracula	Doctor Doom	
#7	Spider-Man	Thunderbolts (Atlas, Techno, Mach IV, Meteorite, Songbird)	Enclave (Carlo Zota, Wladyslav Shinski, Maris Morlak, Unnamed Android)	Thunderbolts Classic Vol 1; Thunderbolts Omnibus Vol 1

== Marvel Team-Up vol. 2 (1997–1998) ==
Issue	Main character	Other character(s)	Villain(s)
#1	Spider-Man	Generation X (Chamber, Husk, Skin)	Blare and Major Love
#2	Spider-Man	Hercules	Doctor Zeus
#3	Spider-Man	Sandman	Flag-Smasher
#4	Spider-Man	Man-Thing	Authority
#5	Spider-Man	The Watcher	Authority
#6	Spider-Man	Namor	Wrecking Crew
#7	Spider-Man	Blade	Henry Sage
#8	Namor	Doctor Strange	Warlord Keerg
#9	Namor	Captain America	Warlord Keerg, Roland R. Tilton, and Atlantean Soldiers
#10	Namor	Thing	Wrecking Crew
#11	Namor	Iron Man	Wrecking Crew

== Marvel Team-Up vol. 3 (2005–2006) ==
Issue	Character(s)	Story title
#1	Spider-Man and Wolverine	The Golden Child
#2	Spider-Man and Wolverine	The Golden Child
#3	Doctor Strange and the Fantastic Four	The Golden Child
#4	Hulk and Iron Man	The Golden Child
#5	Spider-Man and X-23	The Golden Child
#6	Spider-Man, Black Widow, Captain America, X-23	The Golden Child
#7	Moon Knight and Spider-Man	Master of the Ring
#8	Blade, Punisher, and Sunfire	Master of the Ring
#9	Daredevil, Moon Knight, Luke Cage, Spider-Man, Sleepwalker, Black Cat, Sunfire	Master of the Ring
#10	Daredevil, Moon Knight, Spider-Man, Sleepwalker, Punisher, Wolverine, Captain America	Master of the Ring
#11	Doctor Strange, Hulk, Nova, Wolverine, She-Hulk, Spider-Man, Ms. Marvel	Titannus War
#12	Doctor Strange, Hulk, She-Hulk, Nova, Wolverine, Spider-Man, Ms. Marvel	Titannus War
#13	Doctor Strange, Hulk, Ms. Marvel, Nova, She-Hulk, Spider-Man, Wolverine	Titannus War
#14	Spider-Man and Invincible	Invincible
#15	Araña, Dagger, Darkhawk, Gravity, Sleepwalker, Speedball, Terror, X-23	League of Losers
#16	Dagger, Darkhawk, Gravity, Sleepwalker, Speedball, Terror, X-23, and Araña's Arm	League of Losers
#17	Dagger, Darkhawk, Gravity, Mutant 2099, Sleepwalker, Speedball, Terror, X-23, Araña's Arm, Reed Richards	League of Losers
#18	Darkhawk, Gravity, Mutant 2099, Sleepwalker, Speedball, Terror, X-23, Araña, Reed Richards	League of Losers
#19	Cable, Wolverine, Jubilee	1991 (A Freedom Ring Prelude)
#20	Captain America and Freedom Ring	Freedom Ring
#21	Freedom Ring and Spider-Man	Freedom Ring
#22	Captain America, Spider-Man, Luke Cage, Crusader	Freedom Ring
#23	Freedom Ring, Spider-Man, Wolverine, Crusader	Freedom Ring
#24	Freedom Ring, Spider-Man, Wolverine, Captain America, Luke Cage, Spider-Woman, Crusader	Freedom Ring, Titannus Lives!
#25	Dagger, Darkhawk, Gravity, Sleepwalker, Speedball, Terror, X-23, Araña's Arm, Mutant 2099, Reed Richards, Spider-Man, Wolverine, Doctor Strange, Captain America, Luke Cage, She-Hulk, Ms. Marvel, Crusader	Titannus Lives!

== Marvel Team-Up vol. 4 (2019) ==
Issue	Character(s)	Villain	Creative team
#1 LGY#187	Ms. Marvel and Spider-Man	Jackal	Eve Ewing (writer), Joey Vazquez (illustrator)
#2 LGY#188	Ms. Marvel and Spider-Man	Jackal	Eve Ewing (writer), Joey Vazquez (illustrator)
#3 LGY#189	Ms. Marvel and Spider-Man	Jackal	Eve Ewing (writer), Joey Vazquez (illustrator)
#4 LGY#190	Ms. Marvel and Captain Marvel	Manuel, Wastrel, Supremor	Clint McElroy (writer), Ig Guara (illustrator)
#5 LGY#191	Ms. Marvel and Captain Marvel	Manuel, Wastrel, Supremor, Sentry	Clint McElroy (writer), Ig Guara (illustrator)
#6 LGY#192	Ms. Marvel and Captain Marvel	Manuel, Wastrel, Supremor, Starforce Blue	Clint McElroy (writer), Ig Guara (illustrator)

== Contributors ==
=== Vol. 1 (1972–1985) ===
==== Writers ====
Years	Writer	Issues
1972	Roy Thomas	#1
1972–1976	Gerry Conway	#2-12, #28-37, #52
1973–1974	Len Wein	#12-27
1975–1984	Bill Mantlo	#38-51, #53-56, #72, #134-135, #140, Annual #1, #6
1976–1980	Chris Claremont	#57-70, #74-77, #79-86, #88-89, #100, Annual #1-2
1978–1979	Bill Kunkel	#71, #78
1978	Gary Friedrich	#73
1978	Ralph Macchio	#75
1979–1980	John Byrne	#79, #100
1979	Allyn Brodsky	#86
1979–1980	Steven Grant	#87, #90-95, #97
1980	Alan Kupperberg	#96
1980	Roger Stern	Annual #3
1980	Marv Wolfman	#98
1980–1981	Roger McKenzie	#98, #104
1980–1984	Tom DeFalco	#99, #106-107, #109, #138, #140-141
1980–1981	Frank Miller	#100, Annual #4
1981–1983	J. M. DeMatteis	#101, #111-112, #114-133
1981	Mike W. Barr	#102, #105
1981–1984	David Michelinie	#103, #108, #110, #136, #142-143
1982	Mark Gruenwald	#113, Annual #5
1984	Mike Carlin	#137
1984	Cary Burkett	#139, #144, #146-148
1984	Jim Owsley	#141
1984	Tony Isabella	#145
1984–1985	Louise Simonson	#149-150, Annual #7

==== Pencilers ====
Years	Penciler	Issues
1972–1973	Ross Andru	#1-3, #7, #9, #12, #15
1972–1974	Gil Kane	#4-6, #13-14, #16-19, #23
1973–1978	Jim Mooney	#8, #10-11, #24-31, #72
1974–1983	Sal Buscema	#20-22, #32-46, #48-52, #56-58, #82-85, #88, #130, #132-133, Annual #1-2
1976	Ron Wilson	#47
1977–1980	John Byrne	#53-55, #59-70, #75, #79, #100
1978	David Wenzel	#71
1978–1983	Kerry Gammill	#73, #119-125, #127-129, #131
1978–1983	Bob Hall	#74, #126
1978–1979	Howard Chaykin	#76-77
1979	Don Perlin	#78
1979–1980	Mike Vosburg	#80-81, #90
1979	Bob McLeod	#86
1979	Gene Colan	#87
1980	Rich Buckler	#89
1980	Michael Nasser	#89
1980	Pat Broderick	#91
1980	Carmine Infantino	#92-93, #97, #105
1980	Tom Sutton	#93
1980	Mike Zeck	#94
1980	Jimmy Janes	#95
1980	Alan Kupperberg	#96
1980–1982	Herb Trimpe	#106-118, Annual #3-4
1980	Will Meugniot	#98
1980–1981	Jerry Bingham	#99, #101, #103-104
1980	Frank Miller	#100
1981	Frank Springer	#102
1982	Mark Gruenwald	Annual #5
1983–1984	Ron Frenz	#134-136, #140, Annual #6
1984–1985	Greg LaRocque	#137-138, #141-148, #150
1984	Brian Postman	#139
1984	Paul Neary	Annual #7
1985	Bret Blevins	#149

== Collected editions ==
=== Volume 1 ===
- Marvel Team-Up Omnibus
  - Vol. 1 collects #1-30, plus Daredevil #103, Giant-Size Super-heroes #1, Giant-Size Spider-Man #1-3
  - Vol. 2 collects #31-64, Annual #1, plus Giant-Size Spider-Man #4-5, Marvel Two-in-One #17, Marvel Comics Calendar 1975, 1976, 1977, material from Marvel Treasury Edition #13, Marvel Tales #255, 262–263
- Marvel Masterworks: Marvel Team-Up
  - Vol. 1 collects issue #1-11, 248 pages, December 2010, ISBN 978-0785142102
  - Vol. 2 collects issue #12-22, 256 pages, June 2012, ISBN 978-0785159339
  - Vol. 3 collects issue #23-30, Giant-Size Spider-Man #1-3, 272 pages, May 2018, ISBN 978-1302909703
  - Vol. 4 collects issue #31-40, Giant-Size Spider-Man #4-5, Marvel Comics Calendar 1975, 296 pages, January 2019, ISBN 978-1302915209
  - Vol. 5 collects issue #41-52, 304 pages, August 2020, ISBN 978-1-302-92218-4
  - Vol. 6 collects issue #53-64, Annual #1, 320 pages, August 2021, ISBN 978-1-302-92931-2
  - Vol. 7 collects issue #65-77, 304 pages, December 2023
  - Vol. 8 collects issue #78-90, Annual#2, 296 pages, December 2024. #79 (Red Sonja issue) is not included
- Essential Marvel Team-Up
  - Vol. 1 collects issue #1-24, 496 pages, April 2002, ISBN 978-0785108283
  - Vol. 2 collects #25-51, 528 pages, August 2006, ISBN 978-0785121633
  - Vol. 3 collects #52-73, #75, and Annual #1, 480 pages, September 2009, ISBN 978-0785130680
  - Vol. 4 collects #76-78, 80–98, and Annual #2-3, 480 pages, February 2013, ISBN 978-0785167341
- Spider-Man/Iron Man: Marvel Team-Up includes Marvel Team-Up #9-11, #48-51, #72, #110 and #145, 209 Pages, October 2018 978-1302913687
- Spider-Man: Marvel Team-Up by Claremont & Byrne includes Marvel Team-Up #59-70, 75, 240 pages, December 2011, ISBN 978-0785158660
- Fantastic Four/Spider-Man Classic includes Marvel Team-Up #100 and #132-133, 152 pages, April 2005, ISBN 978-0785118039
- Essential Defenders
  - Vol. 5 includes Marvel Team-Up #101, 111 and 116, 448 pages, August 2010, ISBN 978-0785145370
  - Vol. 6 includes Marvel Team-Up #119, 528 pages, October 2011, ISBN 978-0785157540
- Spider-Man: The Complete Alien Costume Saga
  - Volume 1 includes Marvel Team-Up #141-145, Annual #7, 488 pages, January 2012, ISBN 978-0785156130
  - Volume 2 includes Marvel Team-Up #146-150, 504 pages, May 2015, ISBN 978-0785190035

=== Spider-Man Team-Up ===
- Spider-Man: The Complete Clone Saga Epic Vol. 5 includes Spider-Man Team-Up #1, 424 pages, April 2010, ISBN 978-0785144625
- Spider-Man: The Complete Ben Reilly Epic
  - Volume 3 includes Spider-Man Team-Up #2, 432 pages, January 2012, ISBN 978-0785156130
  - Volume 4 includes Spider-Man Team-Up #3, 464 pages, April 2012, ISBN 978-0785161318
  - Volume 5 includes Spider-Man Team-Up #4, 464 pages, July 2012, ISBN 978-0785163831
  - Volume 6 includes Spider-Man Team-Up #5, 448 pages, November 2012, ISBN 978-0785165521
- Thunderbolts Classic Vol. 1 includes Spider-Man Team-Up #7, 296 pages, April 2011, ISBN 978-0785153092

=== Volume 3 ===
#	Title	Material collected	Format	Pages	Released	ISBN
1	The Golden Child	Marvel Team-Up (vol. 3) #1-6	TPB	144	June 1, 2005	978-0785115953
2	Master Of The Ring	Marvel Team-Up (vol. 3) #7-13	TPB	176	December 21, 2005	978-0785115960
3	League Of Losers	Marvel Team-Up (vol. 3) #14-18	TPB	128	June 28, 2006	978-0785119463
4	Freedom Ring	Marvel Team-Up (vol. 3) #19-25	TPB	168	February 7, 2007	978-0785119906

=== Volume 4 ===
- Ms. Marvel Team-Up collects Marvel Team-Up vol. 4 #1-6, November 2019, ISBN 978-1-302-91831-6

== Adaptation ==
The storyline "Spider-Man and Invincible" from Marvel Team-Up #14 was loosely adapted to "I Thought You Were Stronger", the second season finale of the Amazon Prime Video television series adaptation of Invincible, which aired April 4, 2024. Due to Amazon and Robert Kirkman not having the rights to adapt any Marvel Universe characters from the issue to the adaptation, Robert Kirkman consulted with Amazon's legal department to "figure out a way to keep that moment somewhat intact from the comics", ultimately creating the legally distinct parody characters "Agent Spider" and "Prof Ock" to replace Spider-Man and Doctor Octopus, with the former to be voiced by "an actor who had done Spider-Man before". On recommendation of supervising director Dan Duncan, Josh Keaton was cast to voice the parody character, after previously voicing Spider-Man in the animated series The Spectacular Spider-Man, multiple video games, and the film Spider-Man: Across the Spider-Verse (with the character's dialogue in the episode alluding to the latter film franchise's events). Agent Spider would go on to appear in other tie-in media for the series, such as the fighting game Invincible VS (2026).

== See also ==
- The Brave and the Bold – The first DC Comics equivalent.
- DC Comics Presents – The second DC Comics equivalent.
- Ultimate Marvel Team-Up – The Ultimate Marvel Universe's team-up series.
