= Armed and Dangerous =

Armed and Dangerous may refer to:

- Armed & Dangerous (Razor album), a 1984 album by Razor
- Armed and Dangerous (EP), a 1985 EP by Anthrax
- "Armed and Dangerous", a song by Anthrax from Spreading the Disease
- "Armed & Dangerous" (song), a 2020 song by King Von
- "Armed and Dangerous" (song), a 2018 song by Juice Wrld
- Armed and Dangerous (1986 film), a 1986 film by Mark L. Lester starring John Candy, Meg Ryan, Eugene Levy and Jonathan Banks
- Armed and Dangerous (1977 film), a 1977 Soviet western film
- Armed and Dangerous (video game), a 2003 computer and Xbox game by Planet Moon Studios
- Armed and Dangerous (comics), a comics series
- "Armed and Dangerous" (Batwoman), an episode of Batwoman
- Armed and Dangerous, an expansion for the board game RoboRally
- Eric S. Raymond's (born 1957) blog
