= Alien Costume Saga =

Marvel Comics storyline

- The cover to the 1988 collected edition.
- Publisher: Marvel Comics
- Publication date: May 1984 – April 1985
- Genre: Superhero
Title(s)
The Amazing Spider-Man #252-263
Web of Spider-Man #1
The Spectacular Spider-Man #90-100
Marvel Team-Up #141–150

The "Alien Costume Saga" is a superhero comic book story arc published by Marvel Comics and centred on the character Spider-Man. It was originally published in the comic book series The Amazing Spider-Man #252–263, The Spectacular Spider-Man #90–100, Marvel Team-Up #141–150 and Web of Spider-Man #1 from May 1984 to April 1985. It features Spider-Man wearing the alien costume he brought home from Battleworld during the Secret Wars limited series and his subsequent discovery that the new costume is alive.

== Creation ==
The idea for a new costume for Spider-Man (which would later become the separate character Venom) was conceived of by a Marvel Comics reader from Norridge, Illinois named Randy Schueller. Marvel purchased the idea for $220.00 after then-editor-in-chief Jim Shooter sent Schueller a letter acknowledging Marvel's desire to acquire the idea from him in 1982. Schueller's design was then modified by Mike Zeck, becoming the "Symbiote" costume.

Shooter came up with the idea of switching Spider-Man to a black-and-white costume with artists Mike Zeck and Rick Leonardi, as well as others, designing the black-and-white costume. It has been suggested this may have been influenced by the intended costume design for the new Spider-Woman. However, writer/artist John Byrne states on his website that the idea for a costume made of self-healing biological material was one he originated when he was the artist on Iron Fist to explain how that character's costume was constantly being torn and then apparently repaired by the next issue, explaining that he ended up not using the idea on that title, but that Roger Stern later asked him if he could use the idea for Spider-Man's alien costume. Stern then plotted the issue in which the costume first appeared but then left the title. It was writer Tom DeFalco and artist Ron Frenz who had established that the costume was a sentient alien being and also that it was vulnerable to high sonic energy during their run on The Amazing Spider-Man.

By mid-1984, Tom DeFalco and Ron Frenz took over scripting and penciling Amazing Spider-Man. Issue #252 (May 1984) saw the first appearance in the title of Spider-Man's black costume, which the hero would wear almost exclusively for the next four years' worth of comics; Issue #258 (Nov. 1984) revealed that the black costume is a living being, an alien of the Symbiote species. Al Milgrom took over scripting and art on sister title The Spectacular Spider-Man with issue #90 (May 1984) and worked on it through #100 (March 1985). Upon taking a serious look at sales figures for Marvel Team-Up, which featured Spider-Man partnering with a rotating guest character, Marvel's editorial staff found that sales dramatically rose or fell with each issue depending solely on the popularity of that issue's co-star. Taking this into consideration, Shooter concluded that it would make more sense to have another Spider-Man solo series with guest stars appearing when the storyline and or promotional needs called for it, rather than a team-up series which unnaturally forced guest-stars upon the story.

Marvel Team-Up ended with issue #150 (February 1985), to be replaced by new series Web of Spider-Man. This was launched with an April 1985 cover dated issue by writer Louise Simonson and penciller Greg LaRocque The first issue featured a cover painting by artist Charles Vess, and contained the return of the alien black costume, which attempted to rebond with Peter Parker. He managed to rid himself of the costume again using church bells and the alien was presumed to have died after that.

== Plot ==
Following the Secret Wars, Spider-Man returns to Earth from Battleworld wearing a black costume. He discovers the black costume creates its own webbing and can disguise itself as street clothes according to his mental commands. Meanwhile, the mob boss Rose orders the murder of football player Ray Nesters. Spider-Man stops Rose's henchmen, then raids Rose's warehouse prompting Rose to hire Puma to kill Spider-Man. They fight, and Spider-Man is injured when he protects bystanders from debris. Puma decides not to continue the fight until Spider-Man has healed. Later, Peter Parker's girlfriend Mary Jane Watson reveals she has known about his double life as Spider-Man for years. That night, the black costume slips over Spider-Man and takes him out for exercise while he continues to sleep. While out, Peter has a nightmare where his old costume fights the new one. When he wakes, Spider-Man realizes the black costume is leaving him tired.

Spider-Man asks Mr. Fantastic for help, and tests reveal the suit is a living symbiote that has bonded mentally and physically with Spider-Man, and that it is sensitive to sound. When the symbiote tries to graft itself to Spider-Man's body permanently, Mr. Fantastic removes it from Spider-Man's body with a sonic blaster and locks it in a containment cell. Meanwhile, Rose hires the Hobgoblin to attack the Osborn Corporation and Spider-Man wears his old red-and-blue costume to stop him. During the fight, the symbiote escapes from the containment cell returns to Spider-Man's apartment. It disguises itself in such a way that Spider-Man puts it on again, then battles for control of him, before they are both ambushed by the Vulturions. During the course of the fight, Spider-Man makes his way to a church's bell tower, where he uses the sound of the bells to free himself. Before fleeing itself, the symbiote rescues Peter from the sonically lethal tolling of the bells. Awakening later on, he believes the symbiote to be destroyed.

=== Aftermath ===
Following the symbiote's apparent destruction, Spider-Man starts wearing a cloth version of the black costume that was given to him by the Black Cat. Later, it is revealed the symbiote survived and stays in the church until it bonds with disgraced Daily Globe reporter Eddie Brock, who blames Spider-Man for the demise of his career, and becomes Venom to seek revenge on Spider-Man. After defeating Venom, Spider-Man officially returns to his original red-and-blue costume.

== Collected editions ==
The Amazing Spider-Man #252–259 was printed into a graphic novel in 1988 called The Amazing Spider-Man: The Saga of the Alien Costume. Later, two trade paperbacks, titled The Amazing Spider-Man: The Complete Alien Costume Saga were released; they contained The Amazing Spider-Man #252–263, Marvel Team-Up #141–150, The Spectacular Spider-Man #90–100 and Web of Spider-Man #1. The Amazing Spider-Man #252-259 & Web of Spider-Man #1 were also reprinted in Spider-Man: The Birth of Venom which tells the origin of Venom.

Title	Material collected	Published date	ISBN
The Amazing Spider-Man: The Saga of the Alien Costume	Amazing Spider-Man #252–259	March 1991	978-0871353962
Spider-Man: The Birth of Venom	Amazing Spider-Man #252-259 and #298-300, 315–317, Secret Wars #8, Fantastic Four #274, Web of Spider-Man #1	April 2007	978-0785124986
The Amazing Spider-Man: The Complete Alien Costume Saga Book One	Amazing Spider-Man #252-258, Marvel Team-Up #141-145, Annual #7, Peter Parker, The Spectacular Spider-Man #90-95	August 2014	978-0785188674
The Amazing Spider-Man: The Complete Alien Costume Saga Book Two	Amazing Spider-Man #259-263, Annual #18, Marvel Team-Up #146-150, Peter Parker, the Spectacular Spider-Man #96-100, Annual #4, Web of Spider-Man #1	April 2015	978-0785190035
Marvel Masterworks: The Amazing Spider-Man Vol. 24	Amazing Spider-Man #252-262, Annual #18	December 2022	978-1302933265
Spider-Man: The Complete Black Costume Saga Omnibus	Amazing Spider-Man #252-263, Annual #18, Marvel Team-Up #141-150, Annual #7, Peter Parker, the Spectacular Spider-Man #90-100, Annual #4, Web of Spider-Man #1	September 2024	978-1302959920

== In other media ==
=== Television ===
- The "Alien Costume Saga" was loosely adapted into the Spider-Man: The Animated Series three-part episode "The Alien Costume", which was later released direct-to-video as Spider-Man: The Venom Saga. Differences in the plot include the symbiote coming from the Promethium X asteroid instead of Battleworld like in the Secret Wars comic book. The symbiote also gave Spider-Man a more aggressive attitude instead of making him tired and drained, the first official media to do this approach to the symbiote. Instead of Mr. Fantastic as in the comic book, Spider-Man went to Curt Connors for help.
- The "Alien Costume Saga" was loosely adapted into The Spectacular Spider-Man in three episodes; "Persona", "Group Therapy", and "Intervention". The symbiote makes Peter Parker tired and drained and slips onto him while he is sleeping before a battle with the Sinister Six. As in Web of Spider-Man, Peter uses a church bell to force the symbiote off of him.
- The "Alien Costume Saga" was loosely adapted into Marvel's Spider-Man in three episodes; "Sandman", "Symbiotic Relationship", and "Stark Expo". The symbiote is referred as V-252 and it makes Peter Parker cocky, arrogant, and aggressive. He even acts more violently than normal when combating Alistair Smythe. It is removed firstly by Norman Osborn, Smythe and the Vulture and then by Iron Man and Flash Thompson.

=== Film ===
The "Alien Costume Saga" was loosely adapted into Spider-Man 3. A meteorite lands at Central Park and an extraterrestrial symbiote follows Peter Parker to his apartment. While Peter sleeps in his Spider-Man costume, the symbiote assimilates his suit. Peter later awakens and discovers his costume has changed and his powers have been enhanced; however, the symbiote brings out Peter's dark side. After accidentally attacking Mary Jane Watson at a nightclub, Peter realizes the symbiote is corrupting him. Retreating to the church tower, he discovers he cannot remove the suit but that the symbiote weakens when the bell rings. Peter removes the symbiote and it falls to the lower tower, landing on Eddie Brock and turning him into Venom. During the battle against Sandman and Venom, Peter uses a pumpkin bomb to destroy the symbiote while Brock dives after it, killing them both.
