= Ultimate Marvel Team-Up =

US comic book series

- Cover of Ultimate Marvel Team-Up #1 TPB.

Publication information
- Publisher: Marvel Comics
- Schedule: Monthly
- Format: Ongoing
- Publication date: April 2001-July 2002
- No. of issues: 16; Ultimate Spider-Man Super Special
- Main character: Ultimate Spider-Man

Creative team
- Created by: Brian Michael Bendis

Ultimate Marvel Team-Up is a comic book series, published by Marvel Comics which ran for 16 issues, including a concluding Ultimate Spider-Man Super Special. It is set in one of Marvel's shared universes, the Ultimate Universe and is based on the original universe Marvel Team-Up. The whole series starred Spider-Man teaming up with another superhero each issue. The series was written by Brian Michael Bendis, with each arc drawn by a different artist.

== Issues, artists and characters ==
=== Issue 1 ===
- Starring: Spider-Man & Wolverine vs. Sabretooth
- Penciled and Inked by: Matt Wagner
- Trivia: Sabretooth's first appearance in Ultimate Marvel.

=== Issues #2-3 ===
- Starring: Spider-Man & Hulk
- Penciled by: Phil Hester and inked by Ande Parks
- Trivia: Hulk's first appearance in Ultimate Marvel.

=== Issues #4-5 ===
- Starring: Spider-Man & Iron Man vs. Latverian mercenaries
- Penciled and Inked by: Mike Allred
- Trivia: Iron Man's first appearance in Ultimate Marvel.

=== Issues #6-8 ===
- Starring: Spider-Man, the Punisher (in issues #6-8) and Daredevil (issues #7-8)
- Penciled and Inked by: Bill Sienkiewicz
- Trivia: Daredevil & Punisher's first appearance in Ultimate Marvel.

=== Issue #9 ===
- Starring: Spider-Man & Fantastic Four vs. the Skrulls
- Penciled and Inked by: Jim Mahfood
- Trivia: The events in this issue are not in Ultimate Marvel canon

=== Issue #10 ===
- Starring: Spider-Man & Man-Thing vs Lizard
- Penciled and Inked by: John Totleben, with "art assistance" by Ron Randall
- Trivia: The Lizard and Man-Thing's first appearance in Ultimate-Marvel

=== Issue #11 ===
- Starring: Spider-Man & the X-Men
- Penciled and Inked by: Chynna Clugston-Major

=== Issues #12-13 ===
- Starring: Spider-Man and Doctor Strange vs. Xandu
- Penciled and Inked by: Ted McKeever
- Trivia: Doctor Strange's First Appearance in Ultimate Marvel

=== Issue #14 ===
- Starring: Spider-Man & the Black Widow
- Penciled by: Terry Moore and inked by Walden Wong
- Trivia: Black Widow's First Appearance in Ultimate Marvel

=== Issues #15-16 ===
- Starring: Spider-Man & Shang-Chi
- Penciled by: Rick Mays and inked by Jason Martin
- Trivia: Shang-Chi's First Appearance in Ultimate Marvel

=== Ultimate Spider-Man Special ===
- Starring Spider-Man, and many of the other headlined characters above, as well as a small appearance by Blade and Elektra.
- Art by Alex Maleev, Dan Brereton, John Romita, Sr., Al Milgrom, Frank Cho, Jim Mahfood, Scott Morse, Craig Thompson, Michael Avon Oeming, Jason Pearson, Sean Phillips, Mark Bagley, Rodney Ramos, Bill Sienkiewicz, P. Craig Russell, Jacen Burrows, Walden Wong, Leonard Kirk, Terry Pallort, Dave Gibbons, Mike Gaydos, James Kochalka, David Mack, Brett Weldele, Ashley Wood, and Art Thibert

Blade and Elektra's first appearance in Ultimate Marvel

== Collected editions ==
Title	Material collected	Format	Pages	Published date	ISBN
Ultimate Marvel Team-Up Vol. 1	Ultimate Marvel Team-Up #1-5	TPB	144	26 Nov 2001	978-0785108078
Best Of Spider-Man Vol. 1	Amazing Spider-Man (vol. 2) #30–36, Spider-Man's Tangled Web #4–6, Peter Parker: Spider-Man #36, Ultimate Marvel Team-Up #6–8	Oversized HC	336	18 Sep 2002	978-0785109006
Ultimate Marvel Team-Up Vol. 2	Ultimate Marvel Team-Up #9-13	TPB	120	15 Jul 2003	978-0785112990
Ultimate Marvel Team-Up Vol. 3	Ultimate Marvel Team-Up #14-16; Ultimate Spider-Man Special	TPB	136	18 Aug 2003	978-0785113003
Ultimate Marvel Team-Up: Ultimate Collection	Ultimate Marvel Team-Up #1-16; Ultimate Spider-Man Special	TPB	464	20 Sep 2006	978-0785123613
Ultimate Marvel Team-Up	Ultimate Marvel Team-Up #1-16; Ultimate Spider-Man Special	Oversized HC	432	21 Aug 2002	978-0785108702
Ultimate Spider-Man Omnibus Vol. 5	Ultimate Spider-Man (vol. 2) #150–160; Ultimate Comics Fallout #1; Ultimate Marvel Team-Up #1-16; Ultimate Spider-Man Super Special; material from Ultimate Comics Fallout #2, 4, 6	Omnibus	TBC	Nov 2025	David LaFuente cover: TBC
Ultimate Spider-Man Omnibus Vol. 5	Ultimate Spider-Man (vol. 2) #150–160; Ultimate Comics Fallout #1; Ultimate Marvel Team-Up #1-16; Ultimate Spider-Man Super Special; material from Ultimate Comics Fallout #2, 4, 6	Omnibus	TBC	Nov 2025	Mark Bagley DM cover: TBC
