= Bob Hall (comics) =

Writer

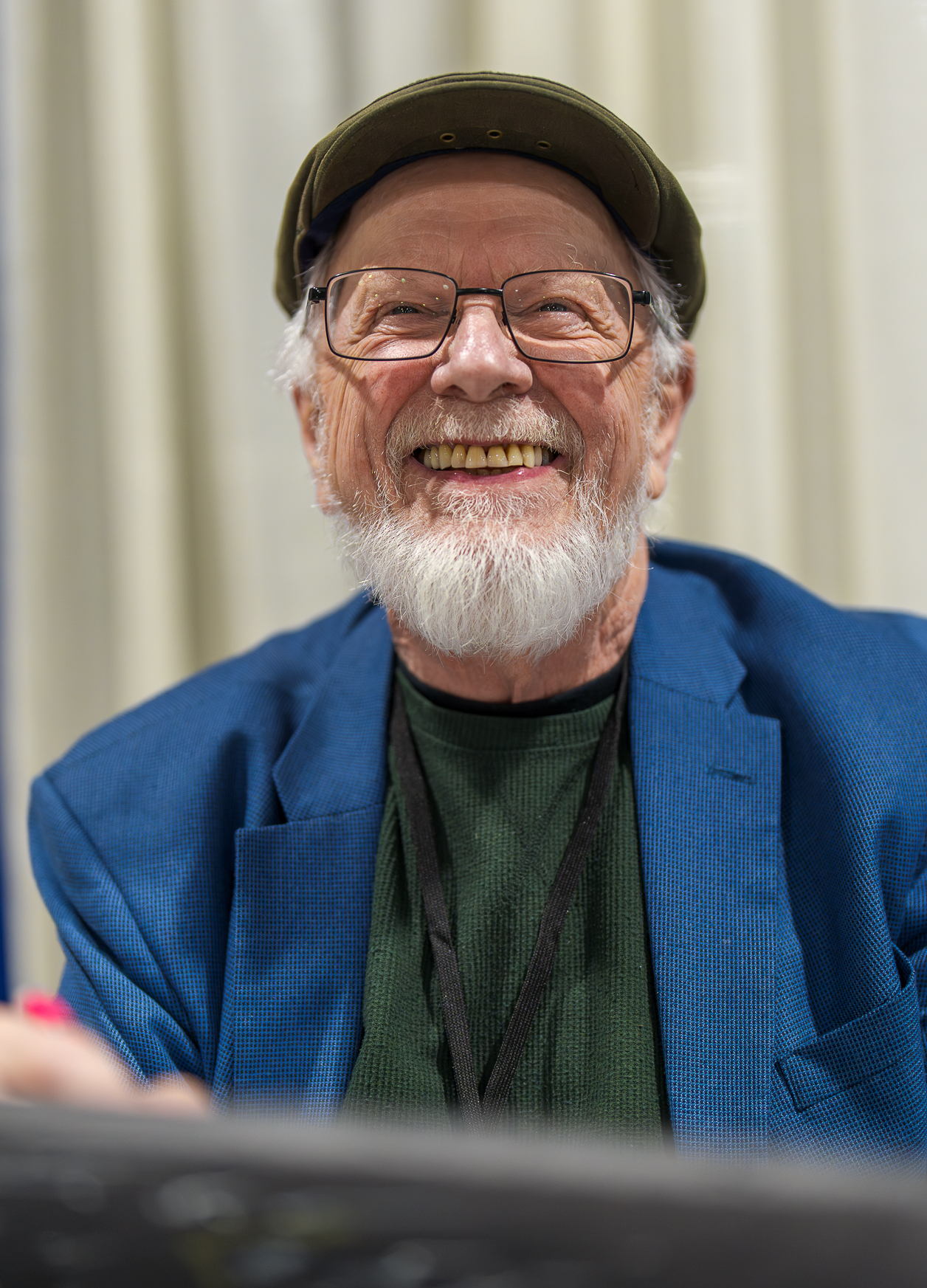
- Hall at GalaxyCon Richmond in 2026
- Born: Robert Hall; October 16, 1944 (age 82)
- Areas: Writer, Penciller, Editor
- Notable works: Shadowman; West Coast Avengers

Robert "Bob" Hall (born October 16, 1944) is an American comics artist and writer as well as a playwright and theatre director. He is the co-creator of the West Coast Avengers for Marvel Comics and has worked on such series as Armed and Dangerous and Shadowman, which he both drew and wrote for Valiant Comics.

== Biography ==
=== Education ===
Hall studied theatre at the University of Nebraska–Lincoln, where he earned a bachelor's and master's degree. Moving to New York City in the early 1970s, he took courses at John Buscema's school of comic art and The New School.

=== Comics ===
Hall began working in the comics industry in 1974 and drew horror stories for Charlton Comics. He soon moved to Marvel Comics and drew The Champions and Super-Villain Team-Up. Hall and writer Chris Claremont collaborated on Marvel Team-Up #74 (October 1978) which featured Spider-Man meeting the cast of NBC's Saturday Night Live Hall briefly worked as an editor for Marvel from 1978 to 1979 under Jim Shooter. Hall later joined Shooter as a writer and penciler at Valiant Comics.

=== Theatre ===
Hall was co-founder of the New Rude Mechanicals, a New York City-based off-off-Broadway theatre company.

In the late 1970s, he co-wrote the script and co-created the set designs for the stage play The Passion of Dracula, which ran for two years off-Broadway in New York City, as well as in London. The Passion of Dracula also screened on Showtime.

Hall is the artistic director of the Flatwater Shakespeare Company of Lincoln, Nebraska, an organization he founded. Previously, he was artistic director of the Nebraska Repertory Theatre for six years, and in 2008 was artistic director of Lincoln's Haymarket Theatre.

== Personal life ==
Hall resides in Lincoln, Nebraska. He has previously lived in England and Ireland.

== Bibliography ==
=== DC Comics ===
- Batman #559 (1998)
- Batman: DOA #1 (1999)
- Batman: I, Joker #1 (1998)
- Batman: Joker Time #1–3 (2000)
- Chase #5 (1998)
- House of Mystery #296 (1981)
- Weird War Tales #100, 103, 108–109 (1981–1982)

=== Marvel Comics ===
- The Amazing Spider-Man #222, 237 (1981–1987)
- The Avengers #213–214, 217, 219–221, 251–254, 280, 301, Annual #16 (1981–1989)
- Avengers Spotlight #37 (1990)
- Bizarre Adventures #33 (1982)
- Captain America: The Movie Special #1 (1992)
- Champions #8–10, 16 (1976–1977)
- Daredevil #154 (1978)
- Darkman #1 (1990)
- Defenders #62, 64–66 (1978)
- Fantastic Four Annual #12 (1977)
- Human Fly #13–15 (1978)
- Ka-Zar #23–24 (1983)
- Marvel Graphic Novel #27: "Emperor Doom" (1987)
- Marvel Team-Up #74, 126 (1978–1983)
- Marvel Two-in-One #44, 99 (1978–1983)
- New Mutants #92 (1990)
- Official Handbook of the Marvel Universe Deluxe Edition #3, 5, 13, 18–20 (1986–1988)
- Power Man and Iron Fist #53–54 (1978)
- The Spectacular Spider-Man #21–25, 74, 124–125 (1978–1987)
- Psi-Force #7, 9, 11–12, 14 (1987)
- Squadron Supreme #1–5, 8 (1985–1986)
- Super-Villain Team-Up #10–12, 14 (1977)
- Thor #330–331, 394, Annual #10–11 (1982–1988)
- West Coast Avengers #1–4 (1984 mini-series)
- What If #34, 43 (1982–1984)

=== Valiant Comics ===
- Armed and Dangerous #1–4 (1996)
- Armed and Dangerous Hell's Slaughterhouse #1–4 (1996–1997)
- Shadowman #0, 10–12, 14-16, 19, 22, 26–43 (1993–1995)

Preceded by Alan Kupperberg	The Avengers artist 1981–1982	Succeeded by Greg LaRocque
Preceded by Bob Layton and Jim Shooter	Shadowman writer 1992–1995	Succeeded by n/a
Preceded by Joe St. Pierre	Shadowman artist 1993–1995	Succeeded by n/a
