= Truth and Consequences =

Truth and Consequences may refer to:

== Geographic ==
- Truth or Consequences, New Mexico, a city in the U.S. state of New Mexico

== Literature ==
- "Truth and Consequences", a novel in the Charmed novel series
- "Truth and Consequences" a short story from the anthology Twilight Zone: 19 Original Stories on the 50th Anniversary
- "Truth and Consequences", a prequel novella of the Women of the Otherworld series

=== Memoirs ===
- Scotland First: Truth and Consequences, a memoir of First Minister of Scotland Henry McLeish
- Truth and Consequences: The Education of Mark Rudd, a memoir of Mark Rudd

=== Comics ===
- "Crashing; Truth and Consequences", an issue in the comic book series The Spectacular Spider-Man
- "Truth and Consequences", the tenth and final issue of the DC Universe: Legacies comic book series

== Television ==
=== Episodes titled "Truth & Consequences" ===
- "Truth & Consequences", an episode of season 6 of Braxton Family Values
- "Truth & Consequences", an episode of season 6 of Drop Dead Diva
- "Truth & Consequences", an episode of season 6 of ER
- "Truth & Consequences", an episode of season 2 of Heroes
- "Truth & Consequences", an episode of season 2 of Love after Lockup
- "Truth & Consequences", an episode of the 1991 TV series Under Cover

=== Episodes titled "Truth and Consequences" ===
- "Truth and Consequences", an episode of season 1 of Army Wives
- "Truth and Consequences", an episode of season 1 of Becker
- "Truth and Consequences", an episode of season 4 of Beverly Hills, 90210
- "Truth and Consequences", an episode of season 3 of Boy Meets World
- "Truth and Consequences", an episode of series/season 19 of Casualty
- "Truth and Consequences", an episode of season 2 of Crossing Lines
- "Truth and Consequences", an episode of season 1 of the 2012 Dallas series revival
- "Truth and Consequences", an episode of season 3 of Doogie Howser, M.D.
- "Truth and Consequences", an episode of Fashion House
- "Truth and Consequences", an episode of season 2 of Felicity
- "Truth and Consequences", an episode of season 2 of Fired Up
- "Truth and Consequences", an episode of Gabriel's Fire
- "Truth and Consequences", an episode of season 3 of The Game
- "Truth and Consequences", an episode of season 2 of the 2019 TV series Games People Play
- "Truth and Consequences", an episode of season 2 of General Hospital: Night Shift
- "Truth and Consequences", an episode of season 1 of the American TV series Gloria
- "Truth and Consequences", an episode of the American 2013 TV drama Hostages
- "Truth and Consequences", an episode of It's All Relative
- "Truth and Consequences", an episode of season 2 of The Jersey
- "Truth and Consequences" (Justified), an episode of season 4 of Justified
- "Truth and Consequences" (Knots Landing), an episode of season 6 of Knots Landing
- "Truth and Consequences", an episode of season 2 of Lost Girl
- "Truth and Consequences", an episode of season 5 of Nash Bridges
- "Truth and Consequences", an episode of October Faction
- "Truth and Consequences", an episode of season 1 of Point of Entry
- "Truth and Consequences", an episode of season 2 of Polyamory: Married & Dating
- "Truth and Consequences", an episode of Power Rangers Dino Thunder
- "Truth and Consequences", an episode of season 2 of The Practice
- "Truth and Consequences", an episode of season 5 of Providence
- "Truth and Consequences" (Star Wars: The Bad Batch), an episode of season 2 of Star Wars: The Bad Batch
- "Truth and Consequences", an episode of season 2 of Suddenly Susan
- "Truth and Consequences" (Superman & Lois), an episode of season 2 of Superman & Lois
- "Truth and Consequences", a two-part episode of season 4 of Trapper John, M.D.
- "Truth and Consequences", an episode of season 2 of Yu-Gi-Oh! 5D's
- "Truth and Consequences/Deceitful Truth", an episode of season 1 of Yu-Gi-Oh! VRAINS
- "Last Hope; Truth and Consequences", an episode of season 19 of The First 48
- an episode of Law and Order

== Music ==
- "Truth and Consequences", a song composed by Newsboys
