= Doc Benway =

Doc Benway is a fictional character appearing in American comic books published by Marvel Comics. The character first appeared in Marvel Team-Up #97 (September 1980).

== Fictional character biography ==
Doctor W. Lee Benway was a corrupt physician hiding out in New Mexico who experimented on criminals until he is stopped by Spider-Woman and the Hulk.
