= Web of Spider-Man =

1985–1995 and 2009-2010 Marvel Comics series

- Cover to Web of Spider-Man #1 (April 1985), featuring Spider-Man in his "black" costume. Art by Charles Vess.

Publication information
- Publisher: Marvel Comics
- Schedule: Monthly
- Format: Ongoing series
- Publication date: (vol. 1); April 1985 – October 1995 (vol. 2); December 2009 – November 2010
- No. of issues: (vol. 1); 129 and 10 Annuals (vol. 2); 12
- Main character: Spider-Man

Creative team
- Written by: List: Louise Simonson #1–3; Danny Fingeroth #4–6, 10–11, 71–72; David Michelinie #8–9, 14–20, 22–24, 70, Annual #7–8; Peter David #7, 12–13, 40–44, 49; Larry Lieber #21, 25; Len Kaminski #26; Dwight Jon Zimmerman #27; Bob Layton #28; Jim Owsley #29–30, 37; J. M. DeMatteis #31–32; Ann Nocenti #33, Annual #1–2; Jim Shooter #34; Gerry Conway #35–36, 47-48, 50–70, Annual #5–6; Fabian Nicieza #38–39; Steve Gerber Annual #4; Maddie Blaustein #45; Richard Howell #46; John Byrne #73; Tony Isabella #74–76; Terry Kavanagh #77–80, 97–120, 123-125, Annual #9–10; Kurt Busiek #81–83; Howard Mackie 84–96; Todd DeZago #121-122, 126–129
- Artist: Unknown
- Penciller: List: Greg LaRocque #1–4; Jim Mooney #5, 10; Mike Harris #6, 13–15; Tony Salmons Annual #1; Sal Buscema #7, 12, 34; Geof Isherwood #8–9; Bob McLeod #11; Marc Silvestri #16–20, 22; Arthur Adams Annual #2; Mike Mignola Annual #2; Larry Lieber #21, 25; Jim Fern #23; Del Barras #24; Tom Morgan #26; Dave Simons #27; Steve Geiger #28–30, 37; Mike Zeck #31–32; Cindy Martin #33, Annual #4; Alex Saviuk #35–36, 38–45, 47–48, 50–51, 54–70, 73–80, 84–116, 120, Annual #3–4, 10; Richard Howell #46; Val Mayerik #49; Frank Springer #52; Mark Bagley #53; Javier Salteres Annual #5; Gil Kane Annual #6; Guang Yap Annual #7; Dave Ross #71–72; Steven Butler #81, 117–120, 122–125, 127–129; Ron Wilson #82; Chris Marrinan #83; Scott McDaniel Annual #8; Nelson Ortega Annual #9; Jerry Bingham Annual #10; Phil Gosier #121; Roy Burdine #126

Web of Spider-Man was a monthly comic book series published by Marvel Comics starring Spider-Man. The first volume ran for 129 issues between 1985 and 1995, and the second ran for 12 issues between 2009 and 2010.

== Publication history ==
=== Volume 1 ===
The first volume of Web of Spider-Man published by Marvel Comics ran for 129 issues, cover dated from April 1985 to October 1995. It replaced Marvel Team-Up as the third major Spider-Man title of the time. Web of Spider-Man Annual ran for ten issues from 1985 to 1994.

The series was launched with an April 1985 cover dated issue by writer Louise Simonson and penciller Greg LaRocque and featured the return of Spider-Man's alien black costume, which attempts to rebond with Peter Parker. Peter rids himself of the costume again using church bells and presumes the alien to have died after that. The first issue featured a cover painting by artist Charles Vess.

In issue #18 (September 1986), Peter Parker is pushed in front of an oncoming train. He thinks to himself that his spider-sense would have warned him of the danger. Writer David Michelinie has said that he wrote this as the first "teaser" appearance of the character Venom, whom he was planning to introduce at a later date. Venom is an amalgam of reporter Eddie Brock and the alien costume. The costume could nullify Spider-Man's spider-sense, and this was the first clue of a puzzle that Michelinie was planning to weave to introduce Venom.

Web of Spider-Man Annual #2 (1986) featured stories written by Ann Nocenti and drawn by Arthur Adams and Mike Mignola. A followup to the Spider-Man vs. Wolverine one-shot appeared in issue #29. The "Kraven's Last Hunt" storyline by writer J.M. DeMatteis and artists Mike Zeck and Bob McLeod began in issue #31 (October 1987).

The "Tribute-to-Teen-Agers" story in issue #35 saw the debut of the creative team of writer Gerry Conway and artist Alex Saviuk. Conway was simultaneously writing The Spectacular Spider-Man, and Web of Spider-Man and Spectacular Spider-Man effectively served as a single serial under two titles during his run, with ongoing stories and subplots crossing between the two Spider-Man series. Web of Spider-Man #50 featured guest-appearances by several minor Marvel super-heroes such as the Puma, the Prowler, and Rocket Racer. A hologram on the cover of issue #90 (July 1992) marked the 30th anniversary of Spider-Man's first appearance. A four-part crossover with Ghost Rider/Blaze: Spirits of Vengeance began in issue #95 (December 1992). Spider-Man donned "Spider-Armor" in issue #100's story by Terry Kavanagh and Alex Saviuk.

The "Clone Saga" storyline began in issue #117 (October 1994) and Ben Reilly became the Scarlet Spider in the next issue.

After issue #129 in October 1995, the title was renamed Web of Scarlet Spider and started again at #1. After four issues, the series was cancelled to make way for the new The Sensational Spider-Man title.

=== Volume 2 ===
In December 2009, Web of Spider-Man volume 2 debuted as an anthology title replacing Amazing Spider-Man Family, with the initial story written by J. M. DeMatteis focusing on Kaine. The title also served as the new home for Spider-Girl, who was written by Tom DeFalco and illustrated by Ron Frenz. The character had first appeared on Marvel.com as The Spectacular Spider-Girl. The stories feature characters tied to "The Gauntlet" storyline, such as Electro, the Rhino, and the Lizard, each titled "Gauntlet: Origins, ...". The series ended in November 2010 with issue #12.

== Collected editions ==
- Essential Web of Spider-Man
  - Vol. 1 collects Web of Spider-Man #1–18 and Annual #1–2, 528 pages, September 2011, ISBN 978-0785157564
  - Vol. 2 collects Web of Spider-Man#19–32 and Annual #3, 480 pages, July 2012, ISBN 978-0785163329
- Spider-Man: Birth of Venom includes Web of Spider-Man #1, 352 pages, April 2007, ISBN 0-7851-2498-5
- Secret Wars II Omnibus includes Web of Spider-Man #6, 1184 pages, May 2009, ISBN 978-0785131113
- Amazing Spider-Man Epic Collection Vol. 17: Kraven's Last Hunt includes Web of Spider-Man #29–32 496 Pages June 2017 978-1302907051
- Spider-Man Fearful Symmetry: Kraven's Last Hunt includes Web of Spider-Man #31–32, 164 pages, December 1991, ISBN 978-0871355522
- Spider-Man's Greatest Villains includes Web of Spider-Man #38, 176 pages, December 1995, ISBN 978-0752201238
- Evolutionary War Omnibus includes Web of Spider-Man Annual #4, 472 pages, September 2011, ISBN 978-0785155478
- Atlantis Attacks Omnibus includes Web of Spider-Man Annual #5, 552 pages, March 2011, ISBN 978-0785144922
- X-Men: Inferno Omnibus includes Web of Spider-Man #47-48, 1240 pages, March 2021, ISBN 978-1302928544
- Spider-Man: The Cosmic Adventures includes Web of Spider-Man #59–61, 192 pages, March 1993, ISBN 978-0871359636
- Acts of Vengeance Omnibus includes Web of Spider-Man #64–65, 744 pages, March 2011, ISBN 978-0785144649
- Spider-Man and New Warriors: Hero Killers includes Web of Spider-Man Annual #8, 232 pages, March 2012, ISBN 978-0785159674
- Spirits of Venom includes Web of Spider-Man #95–96, 48 pages, December 1993, ISBN 978-0785100096
- Spider-Man: Maximum Carnage includes Web of Spider-Man #101–103, 336 pages, December 2006, ISBN 978-0785109877
- Amazing Spider-Man Epic Collection Vol. 26 Lifetheft includes Web of Spider-Man #112, 496 Pages, November 2021 978-1302930691
- Spider-Man: The Complete Clone Saga Epic
  - Book 1 includes Web of Spider-Man #117–119, 424 pages, April 2010, ISBN 978-0785144625
  - Book 2 includes Web of Spider-Man #120–122, 480 pages, June 2010, ISBN 978-0785143512
  - Book 3 includes Web of Spider-Man #123–124, 464 pages, September 2010, ISBN 978-0785149545
  - Book 4 includes Web of Spider-Man #125–127, 480 pages, December 2010, ISBN 978-0785149552
  - Book 5 includes Web of Spider-Man #128–129, 472 pages, February 2011, ISBN 978-0785150091
- The Amazing Spider-Man: Return of the Black Cat includes Web of Spider-Man vol. 2 #1, 168 pages, June 2010, ISBN 978-0785138686
- Spider-Man: New York Stories includes back-up stories from Web of Spider-Man vol. 2 #1, 3–5, 7–11, 152 pages, May 2011, ISBN 0785156372
- The Amazing Spider-Man: The Gauntlet
  - Vol. 1 – Electro & Sandman includes Web of Spider-Man vol. 2 #2, 176 pages, March 2010, ISBN 978-0785142645
  - Vol. 2 – Rhino & Mysterio includes Web of Spider-Man vol. 2 #3–4, 160 pages, April 2010, ISBN 978-0785142652
  - Vol. 3 – Vulture & Morbius includes Web of Spider-Man vol. 2 #2 and #6, 136 pages, June 2010, ISBN 978-0785146117
  - Vol. 5 – The Lizard includes Web of Spider-Man vol. 2 #6, 128 pages, September 2010, ISBN 978-0785146155
- Spider-Man: Grim Hunt includes Web of Spider-Man vol. 2 #7, 192 pages, March 2011, ISBN 978-0785146186
- Spider-Man: The Extremist includes Web of Spider-Man vol. 2 #8–12, 144 pages, May 2011, ISBN 978-0785156703
