= Spider-Man's Greatest Villains =

Graphic novel

Spider-Man's Greatest Villains is a graphic novel edited by Sarra Mossoff published by Boxtree in 1995.

== Contents ==
Spider-Man's Greatest Villains is a collection of eight stories that were originally published from 1964 to 1994, featuring Spider-Man against enemies including Kingpin, Vulture, Hobgoblin and Doctor Octopus.

== Reception ==
Cliff Ramshaw reviewed Spider-Man's Greatest Villains for Arcane magazine, rating it a 7 out of 10 overall. Ramshaw comments that "On the whole, the artwork is functional rather than fancy, the plots are focused, the one-liners witty, and the fights frantic. Greatest Villains is not to be missed, if only for the preposterously piquant Peter Parker alliterations."
