= Armed and Dangerous (comics) =

Armed and Dangerous is the title of a cult favourite comic book published by Valiant Comics. The book revolves around a group of Irish mafioso in New York city and their acquaintances. The stories, written and drawn by Bob Hall, are all black and white and of the comic-noir genre (made popular by Sin City).

== Story ==
The stories are all dark and gritty crime thrillers filled with action, violence and blood.

== Characters ==
Not a complete list

- Coach Heinz - P.E. coach at Eddy's school, Heinz hates gangsters and takes it out on Eddy.
- Charly Donovan - One of the three Donovan brothers. An Irish used-to-be gangster, Charly is a womanizing, loudmouthed, drunken, mean son of a bitch. Hurt on the Brooklyn Bridge the same night his brother Harry was killed. He was assumed dead and stayed that way, leaving New York. He returns once a month to the NY bus station to pick up the $1000 in cash that Mary leaves for him, which keeps him drunk. Charly drank so much that he has trouble remembering his past. He doesn't remember who killed Harry, but he suspects that at one time he knew.
- Doctor Ralphonse Pinto
- Eddy Donovan - A high school kid. His parents are Harry and Mary. He returns to New York to find out the truth behind his family and his father's death.
- Harry Donovan - One of the three Donovan brothers. Harry is the father of Eddy and the husband of Mary. He was killed on the Brooklyn Bridge shortly after the three brothers and Frank Arko took control of the New York underworld.
- Mitch Donovan - One of the three Donovan brothers. When Eddy returns, Mitch tutors him in the family business.
- Frank Arcko
- Frendy
- Gumball - A cog in the gangster machine. Gumball gets his name because he is always chewing gum.
- Hazey - A cab driver friend of Eddy Donovan who looks like Jimi Hendrix to pick up women.
- Jim - A friend of Eddy Donovan from school. Jim steals his fathers gun.
- Lana - A teenage hooker who used to go to school with Eddy. Eddy is in love with Lana, or maybe he just wants to sleep with her...he doesn't know. Silk is her pimp.
- Mary Donovan - Harry's wife and Eddy's mother. Mary is a wreck. She has drunk herself into insanity since Harry's death.
- Rollergirl - A sexy rollerblading assassin in a spandex aerobics outfit. She drivers all the cab drivers wild.
- Silk - Lana's pimp.
- Skindome
- Spuds
- Willy
