= Thermo (comics) =

Publication information
- Publisher: Marvel Comics
- First appearance: Marvel Team-Up #108 (Aug 1981)
- Created by: Tom DeFalco, David Michelinie, and Herb Trimpe

In-story information
- Alter ego: Walter Michaels
- Species: Human mutate
- Notable aliases: Thermatronic Man

Thermo is a fictional character appearing in American comic books published by Marvel Comics.

== Fictional character biography ==
Dr. Walter Michaels, as Thermo, was a costumed criminal who absorbs energy from other humans on contact, and can use it for superhuman strength, superhuman speed, or for projecting powerful bio-electric blasts. He fought Spider-Man and Paladin in his first appearance. They later teamed up with the Dazzler to defeat him.

Thermo later tried to rob the Baxter Building only to be beaten up by Quasar who had an office there.

Thermo was attending an A.I.M. weapons expo and betting against Sunstroke and Captain America (who was posing as Crossbones). When Thermo and the other villains there found out that Crossbones was Captain America in disguise, he and the villains present were defeated.

In the World War Hulk storyline, Thermo was revealed to have been lying low during the Civil War and was robbing evacuated buildings. He was confronted by Warbound member Korg when he and Detective Danny Granville regarding the murder of fellow Warbound member Arch-E-5912. He was left unconscious when he had no information about who murdered Arch-E-5912.

== Powers and abilities ==
Thermo had the ability to extract anyone's energy by touch to increase his strength and speed. He can also fire powerful bio-electric blasts after extracting one's energy.
