= Xandu (comics) =

Fictional Comic Book Character

Xandu is a fictional character appearing in American comic books published by Marvel Comics. The character first appeared in The Amazing Spider-Man Annual #2 (1965).

== Fictional character biography ==
Xandu was an occultist using the Wand of Watoomb who fought Spider-Man and Doctor Strange.
