= Greg LaRocque =

American comics artist (born 1954)

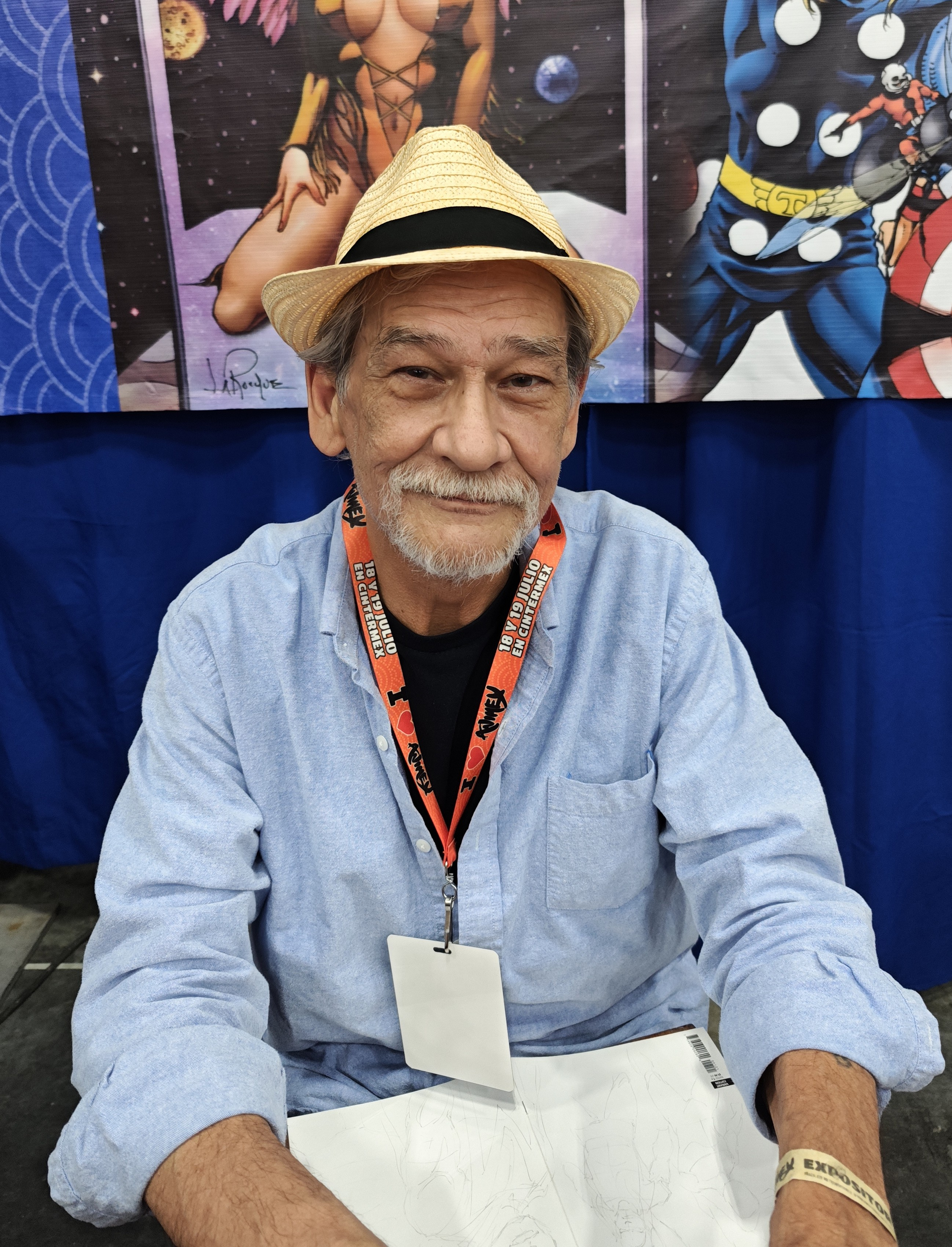
- LaRocque at the July 2026 Animex convention in Monterrey, Mexico
- Born: February 24, 1954 (age 72) Baltimore, Maryland, U.S.
- Area: Penciller
- Notable works: The Avengers; The Flash vol. 2 Legion of Super-Heroes vol. 3 Power Man and Iron Fist

Greg LaRocque (born February 24, 1954) is an American comics artist best known for his work on the Legion of Super-Heroes and The Flash.

Born and raised in Baltimore, Maryland, LaRocque worked as an assistant teacher at the Professional Institute of Art while still a teenager. He started his art career in the advertising field.

== Career ==
Greg LaRocque began his comics career at DC Comics and his first published work was the story "That Which Conquers All" in Mystery in Space #115 (Jan. 1981). This was followed by a series of OMAC back-up stories in The Warlord #42–47 (Feb.–July 1981). His first work for Marvel Comics appeared in Power Man and Iron Fist #73 (Sept. 1981). He drew several issues of Marvel Team-Up including the last issue of the series. He and writer Louise Simonson then launched a new Spider-Man title, Web of Spider-Man, in April 1985. After returning to DC Comics, LaRocque became prominent for his work illustrating the Legion of Super-Heroes. He stated in a 2013 interview that "I decided to leave Marvel for personal reasons, and the first person I called was [editor] Karen Berger. She handed me the next available Legion script, and the day I handed in the work she offered me the book." He drew The Flash with writer William Messner-Loebs from issue #15 (Aug. 1988) through #79 (Aug. 1993). A career highlight was redesigning the Flash's costume. LaRocque and Messner-Loebs introduced Linda Park as a supporting character in the series in The Flash vol. 2 #28 (July 1989) and reintroduced the Pied Piper as a reformed villain and established the character as gay, in issue #53 (Aug. 1991).

Exiled Studio released LaRocque's creator owned material in the three-issue mini-series The Exiled, followed by CryBaby, Exiled Studio's first color comic book. The CryBaby story arc was concluded in the 80-page graphic novel Extinction. LaRocque's The Dreaming graphic novel was published by Exiled Studio in 2009.

LaRocque's work among the independent companies includes London Night Studios, Peregrine Entertainment, Realm Press, Catfish Comics, and Avatar Press. In 2010 he helped launch the revival of Dave Cockrum's Futurians with a cover for David Miller Studio. LaRocque's fantasy art was exhibited at Gallery Provocateur in Chicago to coincide with his appearance at the 2010 Chicago ComicCon. He returned to DC Comics in 2011 to draw the DC Retroactive: The Flash - The '80s one-shot.

== Bibliography ==
=== Alternative Comics ===
- 9–11 Emergency Relief (2002)

=== DC Comics ===
- DC Retroactive: The Flash – The '80s #1 (2011)
- Fighting American #1–6 (1994)
- The Flash vol. 2 #15–18, 20–22, 24–28, 30–59, 62–65, 67–71, 73–79, Annual #2–3 (1988–1993)
- Ghosts #98, 103 (1981)
- Justice League America Annual #7 (1993)
- Justice League Quarterly #13 (1993)
- Justice League Task Force #9, 16 (1994)
- Legion of Super-Heroes vol. 3 #15, 17–48, Annual #3 (1985–1988)
- Mystery in Space #115 (1981)
- Primal Force #7 (1995)
- Secrets of Haunted House #33–34, 36, 41, 46 (1981–1982)
- Showcase '95 #3 (Eradicator) (1995)
- Steel #17 (1995)
- The Unexpected #207 (1981)
- The Warlord #42–47 (OMAC back-up stories) (1981)
- Weird War Tales #95, 104 (1981)
- Who's Who in the DC Universe #2–3, 10, 16 (1990–1992)
- Who's Who in the DC Universe Update 1993 #1 (1992)
- Who's Who in the Legion of Super-Heroes #1–7 (1988)
- Who's Who: The Definitive Directory of the DC Universe #7, 11, 13–14, 19, 21, 24–25 (1985–1987)
- Who's Who: Update '87 #1–3, 5 (1987)
- Who's Who: Update '88 #3–4 (1988)

==== Paradox Press ====
- The Big Book of Conspiracies (1995)
- The Big Book of Hoaxes (1996)

=== Exiled Studio ===
- The Exiled #1 (1998)

=== London Night ===
- Razor: Uncut #39–40, 42 (1997)

=== Marvel Comics ===
- The Amazing Spider-Man Annual #15 (back-up feature) (1981)
- The Avengers #222–223, 225–226 (1982)
- Bizarre Adventures #32 (1982)
- The Incredible Hulk vol. 2 #279 (1983)
- Marvel Comics Presents #55 (Collective Man) (1990)
- Marvel Graphic Novel #16 ("The Aladdin Effect") (1985)
- Marvel Super-Heroes vol. 2 #11, 13–14 (1992–1993)
- Marvel Team-Up #137–138, 141–148, 150 (1984–1985)
- Micronauts #37 (1982)
- Moon Knight #21–22 (1982)
- Official Handbook of the Marvel Universe #5, 10 (1983)
- Power Man and Iron Fist #73, 91, 103–104, 106, 108–113 (1981–1985)
- Rom #25, Annual #1 (back-up stories) (1981–1982)
- The Spectacular Spider-Man #60, 63, 83, 124 (1981–1987)
- Thor #323 (1982)
- Web of Spider-Man #1–5 (1985)
- What If...? #32 (Avengers), #35 (Yellowjacket) (1982)

Preceded by Ron Frenz	Marvel Team-Up artist 1984–1985	Succeeded by n/a
Preceded by Richard Howell	Power Man and Iron Fist artist 1984–1985	Succeeded by Billy Graham
Preceded by n/a	Web of Spider-Man artist 1985	Succeeded by Mike Harris
Preceded by Steve Lightle	Legion of Super-Heroes vol. 3 artist 1985–1988	Succeeded by Keith Giffen
Preceded by Mike Collins	The Flash vol. 2 artist 1988–1993	Succeeded by Mike Wieringo
