= List of Ultimate Marvel publications =

Ultimate Marvel, later known as Ultimate Comics, was an imprint of comic books published by Marvel Comics, featuring re-imagined and modernized versions of the company's superhero characters from the Ultimate Marvel Universe. The imprint ran from 2000 to 2015, starting with the Ultimate Spider-Man series and ending with the Ultimate End series.

== Ongoing and limited series ==
Titles in this section are organized by approximate publication date and line title.

=== Ultimate Marvel (2000–2009) ===
Comic	Issues	Written by	Penciller(s)	Related comics	Starring
Ultimate Spider-Man	#1–133 (2000–2009)	Brian Michael Bendis	Mark Bagley; Stuart Immonen	Wizard 1/2 special	Peter Parker/Spider-Man
Ultimate Marvel Team-Up	#1–16 (2001–2002)	Brian Michael Bendis	Matt Wagner; Phil Hester; Mike Allred; Bill Sienkiewicz; Jim Mahfood; John Totleben; Chynna Clugston Flores; Ted McKeever; Terry Moore; Rick Mays	Ultimate Spider-Man Special	Spider-Man
Ultimate X-Men	#1–100 (2001–2009)	Mark Millar (#1–12, 15–33, Ultimate War #1–4); Chuck Austen (#13–14); Geoff Johns (Wizard 1/2 special); Brian Michael Bendis (#34–45); Brian K. Vaughan (#46–65, Annual #1); Mike Carey (Ultimate X4 #1–2); Robert Kirkman (#66–93, Annual #2); Aron Eli Coleite (#94–100, X-Men/FF Annual #1–2, Ultimate Requiem)	Adam Kubert (#1–4, 7–8, 10–12, 15–17, 20–22, 25, 29, 31–33); Andy Kubert (#5–6, 50–53); Tom Raney (#9, 66–68, 72–74, Annual #1); Tom Derenick (#12); Esad Ribic (#13–14); Aaron Lopresti (#1–2); Chris Bachalo (#18–19, Ultimate War #1–4); Kaare Andrews (#23–24); Ben and Ray Lai (#26); David Finch (#27–28, 30, 34–45); Brandon Peterson (#46–49, X-Men/FF Annual #2); Stuart Immonen (#54–57, 59–65); Steve Dillon (#58); Pasqual Ferry (Ultimate X4 #1–2); Leinil Francis Yu (Ultimate X4 #2); Ben Oliver (#69–71, 75–76, 78, 81, Ultimate Requiem); Salvador Larroca (Annual #2, 88–92); Yanick Paquette (#77, 79–80, 84–88); Pascal Alixe (#82–83); Harvey Tolibao (#93); Mark Brooks (#94–100, X-Men/FF Annual #1)	Wizard 1/2 special	Ultimate X-Men
The Ultimates	#1–13; 2002–2003)	Mark Millar	Bryan Hitch		The Ultimates
Ultimate Daredevil and Elektra	#1–4 (2002–2003)	Greg Rucka	Salvador Larroca		Ultimate Daredevil; Ultimate Elektra
Ultimate Adventures	#1–6 (2002–2004)	Ron Zimmerman	Duncan Fegredo		Hawk-Owl & Woody
Ultimate War	#1–4 (2002–2003)	Mark Millar	Chris Bachalo		The Ultimates; Ultimate X-Men
Ultimate Six	#1–7 (2003–2004)	Brian Michael Bendis	Trevor Hairsine		The Ultimates; Ultimate Spider-Man; Sinister Six
Ultimate Fantastic Four	#1–60 (2004–2009)	Brian Michael Bendis and Mark Millar (#1–6); Warren Ellis (#7–18); Mike Carey (#19–20, 33–57, Ultimate X4 #1–2, Annual #2); Mark Millar (#21–32, Annual #1); Joe Pokaski (#58–60, FF/X-Men Annual #1–2, Ultimate Requiem)	Adam Kubert (#1–6, 13–18); Stuart Immonen (#7–12, Annual 2); Jae Lee (#19–20, Annual #1); Greg Land (#21–32); Frazer Irving (Annual #2); Pasqual Ferry (#33–38, 42–46, Ultimate X4 #1–2); Leinil Francis Yu (Ultimate X4 #2); Scott Kolins (#39–41); Mark Brooks (#39–41, 47–49); Tyler Kirkham (#50–60); Eric Nguyen (FF/X-Men Annual #1); Dan Panosian (FF/X-Men Annual #2); Robert Atkins (Ultimate Requiem)		Ultimate Fantastic Four
Ultimate Elektra	#1–5 (2004)	Mike Carey	Salvador Larroca		Ultimate Daredevil; Ultimate Elektra
Ultimate Galactus Trilogy	#1–14 (2004–2006)	Warren Ellis	Ultimate Nightmare; Trevor Hairsine (#1–2, 4–5); Steve Epting (3); Ultimate Secret; Steve McNiven (#1–2); Tom Raney (3–4)	Ultimate Nightmare #1–5; Ultimate Secret #1–4; Ultimate Extinction #1–5	Gah Lak Tus
The Ultimates 2	#1–13 (2005–2007)	Mark Millar	Bryan Hitch	Ultimates Saga	The Ultimates; Liberators
Ultimate Iron Man	#1–10 (2005–2008)	Orson Scott Card	Andy Kubert, Mark Bagley		Iron Man
Ultimate Wolverine vs. Hulk	#1–6 (2005–2009)	Damon Lindelof	Leinil Francis Yu		Ultimate Wolverine; Ultimate Hulk
Ultimate X4	#1–2 (2005–2006)	Mike Carey	Pasqual Ferry; Leinil Francis Yu		Ultimate X-Men; Ultimate Fantastic Four
Ultimate Vision	#0–5 (2006–2007)	Mike Carey	Brandon Peterson		Ultimate Vision; Ultimate Falcon
Ultimate Power	#1–9 (2006–2008)	Brian Michael Bendis (#1–3); J. Michael Straczynski (#4–6); Jeph Loeb (#7–9)	Greg Land		Ultimate Spider-Man; Ultimate X-Men; Ultimate Fantastic Four; The Ultimates; The Squadron Supreme
Ultimate Human	#1–4 (2008)	Warren Ellis	Cary Nord		Ultimate Hulk; Ultimate Iron Man
The Ultimates 3: Who Killed the Scarlet Witch?	#1–5 (2008)	Jeph Loeb	Joe Madureira		The Ultimates
Ultimate Origins	#1–5 (2008)	Brian Michael Bendis	Jackson Guice		
Ultimatum	#1–5 (2009)	Jeph Loeb	David Finch	March on Ultimatum Saga; Ultimate Requiem	Crossover event

=== Ultimate Comics ===
Comic	Issues	Written by	Penciller(s)	Related comics	Starring
Ultimate Spider-Man	#1–15, #150–160 (reverted to original numbering) (2009–2011)	Brian Michael Bendis	Sara Pichelli; Chris Samnee; David Marquez		Spider-Man (Peter Parker)
Ultimate Comics: Armor Wars	#1–4 (2009–2010)	Warren Ellis	Steve Kurth		Iron Man
Ultimate Comics: Avengers	#1–18 (2009–2011)	Mark Millar	Carlos Pacheco; Leinil Francis Yu; Steve Dillon; Stephen Segovia		Nick Fury & The Ultimates
Ultimate Comics: Doomsday	12 issues (2010–2011)	Brian Michael Bendis	Rafa Sandoval	Ultimate Enemy #1–4; Ultimate Mystery #1–4; Ultimate Doom #1–4	Crossover event
Ultimate Comics: X	#1–5 (2010–2011)	Jeph Loeb	Art Adams		X-Men
Ultimate Comics: New Ultimates	#1–5 (2010–2011)	Jeph Loeb	Frank Cho		Ultimates
Ultimate Comics: Thor	#1–4 (2010–2011)	Jonathan Hickman	Carlos Pacheco		Thor
Ultimate Comics: Captain America	#1–4 (2011)	Jason Aaron	Ron Garney		Captain America
Ultimate Avengers vs. New Ultimates	#1–6 (2011)	Mark Millar	Leinil Francis Yu	Ultimate Comics: Avengers; Ultimate Comics: New Ultimates	Ultimates, Spider-Man

=== Ultimate Comics: Reborn ===
Comic	Issues	Written by	Penciller(s)	Related comics	Starring
Ultimate Fallout	#1–6 (2011)	Brian Michael Bendis; Jonathan Hickman; Nick Spencer	Mark Bagley; Gabriel Hardman; Bryan Hitch; Lee Garbett; Steve Kurth; Eric Nguyen; Carlo Pagulayan; Sara Pichelli; Salvador Larroca; Clayton Crain; Luke Ross; Billy Tan; Mitch Breitweiser		Crossover
Ultimate Comics: The Ultimates	#1–30 (2011–2013)	Jonathan Hickman; Sam Humphries; Joshua Hale Fialkov	Esad Ribic; Brandon Peterson; Luke Ross; Butch Guice; Leonard Kirk; Patrick Zircher; Ron Garney; Billy Tan; Timothy Green II	#18.1	The Ultimates
Ultimate Comics: Hawkeye	#1–4 (2011–2012)	Jonathan Hickman	Rafa Sandoval		Ultimate Hawkeye
Ultimate Comics: Spider-Man	#1–28 (2011–2013)	Brian Michael Bendis	Sara Pichelli; Chris Samnee; David Marquez; Pepe Larraz	#16.1	Spider-Man (Miles Morales)
Ultimate Comics: X-Men	#1–33 (2011–2013)	Nick Spencer; Brian Wood	Paco Medina; Carlo Barberi; Reilly Brown	#18.1	Ultimate X-Men
Ultimate Comics: Iron Man	#1–4 (2012–2013)	Nathan Edmondson	Mateto Buffagni		Ultimate Iron Man
Ultimate Comics: Wolverine	#1–4 (2013)	Cullen Bunn	David Messina		Ultimate Wolverine
Hunger (Note: The Hunger miniseries is one of two story arcs bannered as resulting from the Marvel Universe crossover/miniseries Age of Ultron and serves as a prologue for the following miniseries, Cataclysm.)	#1–4 (2013)	Joshua Hale Fialkov	Leonard Kirk		
Cataclysm (Note: Hunger acts as a prologue to the event, while Survive! #1 one-shot serves as the miniseries epilogue.)	#0.1 (2013)	Joshua Hale Fialkov	Mico Suayan; Mirco Pierfederici; Leonard Kirk		
Cataclysm: The Ultimates' Last Stand	#1–5 (2013–2014)	Brian Michael Bendis	Mark Bagley		
Cataclysm: Ultimate Spider-Man	#1–3 (2013–2014)	Brian Michael Bendis	David Marquez		
Cataclysm: Ultimates	#1–3 (2013–2014)	Joshua Hale Fialkov	Alvaro Martinez		
Cataclysm: Ultimate X-Men	#1–3 (2013–2014)	Joshua Hale Fialkov	Carmine Di Giandomenico		
Survive!	#1 (2014)	Brian Michael Bendis	Joe Quinones		
Ultimate Comics Spider-Man	#200 (2014)	Brian Michael Bendis	David Marquez; Mark Bagley; Mark Brooks; Stuart Immonen; David Luafuente; Sara Pichelli		

=== Ultimate Marvel NOW! (2014–2015) ===
Comic	Issues	Written by	Penciller(s)	Related comics	Starring
All-New Ultimates	#1–12 (2014–2015)	Michel Fiffe	Amilcar Pinna; Giannis Milonogiannis		
Ultimate FF	#1–6 (2014)	Joshua Hale Fialkov; Stuart Moore	Mario Guevara; Tom Grummett; Andre Lima Araujo		
Miles Morales: Ultimate Spider-Man	#1–12 (2014–2015)	Brian Michael Bendis	David Marquez		
Ultimate End	#1–5 (2015)	Brian Michael Bendis	Mark Bagley		

== Crossovers ==
- Age of Ultron #10 (2013) (Note: Featuring mainstream Galactus entering Ultimate Universe in the series' epilogue.)
- All-New All-Different Avengers #1 (2015, a FCBD issue, featuring Miles Morales in "All-New All-Different" post-Secret Wars single Marvel Universe)
- All-New X-Men #31–36 (2014–2015)
- Avengers, Volume 5, #41–42, 44 (2015)
- Deadpool, Volume 3, #45 (a.k.a. Volume 1, #250, 2015) (Note: Shows the destruction of the mainstream and Ultimate Earths.)
- Secret Wars (2015–2016)
  - Secret Wars #0–9 (2015–2016, the zero issue is a FCBD one)
  - Battleworld: Thors #1–4 (2015, the Secret Wars tie-in, featuring Ultimate Thor)
- Spider-Men #1–5 (2012)
- Spider-Men II #1–5 (2017–18)
- Spider-Verse (2014–2015)
  - Amazing Spider-Man, Volume 3, #9–15 (2014–2015)
  - Scarlet Spiders #1–3 (2014–2015)
  - Spider-Verse #1–2 (2014–2015)
  - Spider-Verse Team-Up #2 (2014)
  - Spider-Woman, Volume 5, #3 (2015)
- Squadron Supreme, Volume 3, #1–12 (2008–2009) (Note: Featuring Ultimate Nick Fury.)
- Battleworld: Ultimate End #1–5 (2015) (Note: Ultimate End is a tie-in to the 2015 mega-event Secret Wars, taking place outside of the Ultimate Universe, which had been destroyed at the beginning of the event.)
- Ultimates 2 #8-9, 100 (2017)
- Venom (Vol. 4) #26, 200 (2020–21)

== Annuals ==
- The Ultimates Annual #1 (written by Mark Millar and penciled by Steve Dillon, 2005)
- The Ultimates Annual #2 (written by Charlie Huston and penciled by Mike Deodato and Ryan Sook, 2006)
- Ultimate Captain America Annual #1 (written by Jeph Loeb and penciled by Marko Djurdjevic and Rafa Sandoval, 2008)
- Ultimate Fantastic Four Annual #1 (written by Mark Millar and penciled by Jae Lee, 2005)
- Ultimate Fantastic Four Annual #2 (written by Mike Carey and penciled by Stuart Immonen and Frazer Irving, 2006)
- Ultimate Fantastic Four/X-Men Annual #1 (written by Aron Coliete and Joe Pokaski and penciled by Brandon Peterson and Eric Nguyen, 2008)
- Ultimate Hulk Annual #1 (written by Jeph Loeb and penciled by Marko Djurdjevic and Ed McGuinness, 2008)
- Ultimate Spider-Man Annual #1–2 (written by Brian Michael Bendis and penciled by Mark Brooks, 2005, 2006)
- Ultimate Spider-Man Annual #3 (written by Brian Michael Bendis and penciled by David Lafuente, 2008)
- Ultimate X-Men Annual #1 (written by Brian K. Vaughan and penciled by Tom Raney, 2005)
- Ultimate X-Men Annual #2 (written by Robert Kirkman and penciled by Salvador Larroca, 2006)
- Ultimate X-Men/Fantastic Four Annual #1 (written by Aron Coliete and Joe Pokaski and penciled by Mark Brooks and Dan Panosian, 2008)

== Handbooks ==
- Official Handbook of the Ultimate Marvel Universe: Spider-Man and Fantastic Four (2005)
- Official Handbook of the Ultimate Marvel Universe: X-Men and The Ultimates (2005)
- Official Handbook of the Ultimate Marvel Universe: Ultimate Secrets (2008)

== Novels ==
- Tomorrow Men (2007)
- Against All Enemies (2007)

== See also ==
- Ultimate Marvel
