= Ultimate Comics: Thor =

Comic book limited series

- Artwork for the cover of Ultimate Comics: Thor 1 (Oct 2010); Art by Carlos Pacheco

Publication information
- Publisher: Marvel Comics
- Schedule: Monthly
- Format: Limited series
- Genre: Superhero
- Publication date: October 2010 – February 2011
- No. of issues: 4

Creative team
- Written by: Jonathan Hickman
- Penciller: Carlos Pacheco
- Inker(s): Dexter Vines; Jeff Huet; Jason Paz
- Letterer: Clayton Cowles
- Colorist(s): Edgar Delgado; J. Aburtov; Jorge Gonzalez

Ultimate Comics: Thor is a comic book limited series published by Marvel Comics that debuted in October 2010. The series takes place in the alternative Ultimate Marvel universe. Based on the Ultimate Comics version of the Norse god Thor, the series was written by Jonathan Hickman with art by Carlos Pacheco. In an interview, Hickman said that the series would be a prequel to Mark Millar's limited series The Ultimates,

"It starts eons ago, in the long ago time of mystic Asgard, and, yes, takes us up to the start of [the first issue of] ULTIMATES. If I do my job well, it should jive [sic] with all the Ultimate Thor things we've seen up to this point."

The series also features the debut of the Ultimate Baron Zemo, expands on areas of Norse mythology and portrays the events of Ragnarok.

== Plot ==
The series takes place over three different time periods: the ancient era eons ago when the Asgardians warred with the Frost Giants, 1939 in the early days of World War II, and modern times shortly before the events of The Ultimates.

Eons ago, a war raged between the Norse Gods of Asgard and the Frost Giants of Jotunheim. Odin's three sons, Thor, Balder, and Loki, become the greatest of the Asgardian warriors. Eventually, Mjolnir is forged and with its power, the war is brought to a swift end in favor of the Asgardians. After a public tournament in which Balder is the victor, Odin takes Thor aside and privately confides in him that he is the source of Asgard's power, and when he inevitably dies during Ragnarok, Asgard will be destroyed along with him. However, he reassures Thor by telling him that his legacy will live on through Mjolnir and the Norn Stones, which are extensions of his power. Meanwhile, Loki decides to betray Asgard and steals the Norn Stones, killing Balder when he tries to interfere before fleeing Asgard.

During World War II, Baron Zemo approaches Heinrich Himmler and asks for an army to invade Asgard. While Himmler is skeptical at first, Zemo shows him that he possesses the mythical Norn Stones. Himmler immediately approves Zemo's plan. Zemo then uses the stones to summon the Frost Giants, and the combined German and Frost Giant forces attack Asgard. Zemo then reveals himself to be Loki, finally making his move on his former home. The Asgardians are taken by surprise and slaughtered, leaving only Odin and Thor left. In anger, Odin pushes Loki into the World Tree, where he is locked in the Room With No Doors. Odin himself is killed by the Frost Giants. In a rage, and with Asgard in ruins and disappearing from existence, Thor attacks the advancing Frost Giant and Nazi forces.

In the modern era, Thor is reincarnated as a human named Thorleif Golmen who was participating in the European super soldier project and claims he is the God of Thunder. Fearing that he has gone insane, Dr. Braddock (father of Captain Britain) enlists the help of Dr. Donald Blake, who examines Thor, and declares that Thor is telling the truth about his godly heritage. While Braddock is skeptical, he decides to continue with the project. Later, it is revealed that Blake is the reincarnation of Balder. He tells Thor that the other Asgardians have also been reincarnated, and that it is only a matter of time before Odin returns to rebuild Asgard. As part of the super soldier project, Thor is given advanced equipment that mimics his godlike abilities, including flight, invulnerability, teleportation, and weather control. When the scientists behind the experiment find difficulty in storing the portable power source, Thor requests they turn it into a hammer. He then leaves to assist in various humanitarian efforts as a social activist. Nick Fury attempts to recruit Thor into the Ultimates, but is rebuffed. Meanwhile, in Germany, an old German World War II veteran follows instructions given to him by Loki and uses the Norn Stones to free him from the Room With No Doors. Thor and Balder sense Loki's escape. At the same time, Bruce Banner injects himself with his flawed super soldier serum and begins a murderous rampage through New York as a larger, grey-skinned Hulk. In order to combat Loki, Thor finally decides to fulfill his role as a hero and bring thunder against "the men who make war". He teleports to New York to fight the Hulk in the battle that would begin his alliance with the Ultimates.

== See also ==
- Ultimates
- Ultimate Comics: New Ultimates
