= Monica Chang =

Publication information
- First appearance: Ultimate Marvel: Ultimate Comics: Avengers #3 (December 2009); Earth-616: Avengers A.I. #1 (July 2013)
- Created by: Mark Millar; Carlos Pacheco

In-story information
- Species: Human
- Team affiliations: S.H.I.E.L.D., Ultimates, Avengers
- Notable aliases: Black Widow
- Abilities: Slowed aging; Enhanced immune system; Abnormally superior athletic condition; Hypnosis; Enhanced psychological defenses

Black Widow (Monica Chang-Fury) is a fictional character appearing in American comic books published by Marvel Comics. An Ultimate Marvel version was first seen in 2009 as an Asian American and the ex-wife of that universe's Nick Fury, while an Earth-616 version later debuted in 2013 as a devout Muslim.

== Fictional character biography ==
Monica Chang-Fury was created by Mark Millar and Carlos Pacheco, and debuted in Ultimate Comics: Avengers #3 (December 2009) as the second Black Widow in the Ultimate Marvel continuity. She is the former wife of Nick Fury. Chang and Fury divorced after she found out that Fury cheated with all her female family members and friends.

Chang is initially an active member of the Avengers' missions. Chang later transfers to the New Ultimates alongside Captain America, Iron Man and Thor and fights against her former teammates, who were supposedly selling government secrets.

Chang rejoins the Ultimates and moves to the Triskelion. She joins Fury, Hawkeye and the Falcon in battling the Maker's Children of Tomorrow. After a nuclear attack on Washington, D.C. kills most of the presidential cabinet, a new "Civil War" erupts. Chang personally helps against Marvin Flumm, resulting in her becoming the director of S.H.I.E.L.D. While working with the FBI, Chang is apparently killed by the Green Goblin.

== Other versions ==
Monica Chang makes her first appearance in Marvel's mainstream Earth-616 continuity in the Avengers A.I. series. This version is the chief of S.H.I.E.L.D.'s A.I. Division, and is an Asian American devout Muslim.

== See also ==
- List of Black Widow characters
