= Cataclysm (comics) =

2013 comic book miniseries

Cataclysm: The Ultimates' Last Stand
- Cover to Cataclysm: The Ultimates' Last Stand #1

Publication information
- Publisher: Marvel Comics
- Schedule: Monthly
- Format: Limited series
- Genre: Superhero
- Publication date: 2013
- No. of issues: 5
- Main character: Ultimate Marvel

Creative team
- Written by: Brian Michael Bendis
- Artist: Mark Bagley

Cataclysm: The Ultimates' Last Stand was a 2013 comic book crossover, set within the Ultimate Marvel imprint.

== Editorial history ==
Cataclysm is a sequel to the main-continuity Age of Ultron crossover. At the end of that story, Galactus is displaced to the Ultimate Marvel universe. Unlike the Ultimate Galactus Trilogy, this is the character from the mainstream universe rather than a reimagining. The story was published in two parts, "Hunger", set in space, and "The Ultimates' Last Stand", set in Earth. The second part has tie-ins with the three ongoing Ultimate Marvel comics at the time, Ultimate Comics: Spider-Man, Ultimate Comics: X-Men, and Ultimate Comics: The Ultimates. The "Survive!" one-shot narrates the aftermath of the event. After the event, the Ultimates and X-Men comics were closed. They were replaced by the "All-New Ultimates" (with a complete new cast of characters) and "Ultimate FF". The Spider-Man comic was renamed as "Miles Morales: Ultimate Spider-Man".

The "Hunger" miniseries was made by Leonard Kirk and Joshua Hale Fialkov, who had been working with Ultimates. Fialkov commented that he was a big fan of Galactus and his creator, Jack Kirby. He pointed that the Ultimate Marvel imprint had always tried to keep the superhero fantasy as grounded as possible, and that he intended to use Galactus to place the characters into a complete unexpected crisis: "What I hope comes across is the sense of wonder that's being brought into the Ultimate Universe... with the smart, modern tone Brian has established." Hunger explored the cosmic characters of the Ultimate Universe, in particular Rick Jones: "Brian created a unique and interesting take on Rick Jones that's really smart and fun. He's like Spider-Man taken to the extreme... with great power comes great responsibility, but he just wants to have fun and be normal." He also commented that he had been checking all the recent events at the Ultimate imprint, trying to write a cosmic story that would be unique to it and that could not take place at the mainstream universe. As the story was set in space, "Hunger" had no tie-in comics.

There were rumors at the time that Marvel would close the Ultimate imprint, which were fueled by the name of the publication and the reunion of Brian Michael Bendis and Mark Bagley for the main comic. Bendis and Bagley had started the imprint in 2000 with Ultimate Spider-Man. When asked about those rumors, editor Mark Paniccia simply replied: "Let me say this, there are some stunning resolutions coming across all the titles!". Bendis dismissed it as "unsubstantiated rumors" at his Tumblr account.

== Plot ==
Galactus is displaced into the Ultimate Marvel universe. When he crosses the portal, the Gah Lak Tus swarm senses his energies, and submits to him. He decimates the Kree and the Chitauri alien races, and he is opposed by Mar-Vell, Rick Jones, and Silver Surfer. Mar-Vell dies, attacked by the swarm, but Rick takes his suit and activates a bomb that destroys it. Rick and the remains of the swarm fall into another dimension, and Galactus heads to Earth, killing Vision in the process. Sensing the reality Galactus hails from, Vision sends a cryptic message to Earth, pleading for the Ultimates to ally with Reed Richards, before shutting down.

Galactus turns out to be more powerful than the Ultimates and the conventional military; realising the desperation of their situation, the Ultimates ally with Miles Morales, Richards, and the X-Men. Tony Stark discovers that he comes from an alternate reality, so Richards and Morales are sent to it to find information. Arriving on Earth-616, they sneak into the Baxter Building and retrieve information about Galactus, who that reality's Richards had defeated before. The two are discovered by Valeria Richards, who recognizes Richards as not her real father, but manage to escape.

The Ultimates' plan is set into motion: Kitty Pryde receives the Giant-Man serum, so that she can destroy Galactus' machine and attack him while in giant size. They also employ Jean Grey to telepathically read Galactus' strategy, but when he senses them and attacks, Steve Rogers sacrifices himself to buy the Ultimates more time to execute their attack. While Galactus manages to seriously harm Pryde in spite of her intangibility, her sacrifice is ultimately a distraction: Richards opens a portal to the Negative Zone, intending to swallow Galactus into it where he will starve with no energy to feed on. Galactus resists the portal's pull, which threatens to tear apart reality if open too long, so Thor sacrifices himself to push Galactus inside; a reluctant Stark and Richards close the portal with Thor still inside.

== Collected editions ==
Title	Material collected	Published date	ISBN
Cataclysm: The Ultimates' Last Stand	Cataclysm: The Ultimates' Last Stand #1-5, Cataclysm: Ultimate Spider-Man #1-3, Cataclysm: Ultimate X-Men #1-3, Cataclysm: Ultimates #1-3, Hunger #1-4, Cataclysm #0.1, Survive #1	June 2014	978-0785189190
