= Captain America (Ultimate Marvel character) =

Alternate version of Captain America in Marvel Multiverse

- Cover art for The Ultimates #11. Art by Bryan Hitch.

Publication information
- Publisher: Marvel Comics (Ultimate Marvel imprint)
- First appearance: The Ultimates #1 (March 2002)
- Created by: Mark Millar; Bryan Hitch (based upon the original character by Joe Simon and Jack Kirby)

In-story information
- Alter ego: Steven "Steve" Rogers
- Species: Human mutate
- Team affiliations: The Ultimates
- Abilities: Physical attributes enhanced to a super human level. Expert martial artist and hand-to-hand combatant All terrain acrobatics Master tactician and field commander Vibranium Adamantium shield
Captain America
- Cover of Ultimate Comics: Captain America 1 (Jan 2011), art by Ron Garney
Publication information
- Publisher: Marvel Comics
- Schedule: Monthly
- Format: Limited series
- Genre: Superhero
- Publication date: January - April 2011
- No. of issues: 4 of 4
- Main character: Ultimate Captain America
Creative team
- Written by: Jason Aaron
- Artist: Ron Garney
- Letterer: Clayton Cowles
- Colorist(s): Jason Keith; Jim Charalampidis

Captain America (Steven "Steve" Rogers) is a superhero appearing in American comic books published by Marvel Comics. He appears in the Ultimate Marvel line of books, and is an alternative version of Captain America. The character first appeared in The Ultimates #1 (March 2002), and was created by writer Mark Millar and artist Bryan Hitch (based upon the original version of the character by Joe Simon and Jack Kirby).

== Fictional character biography ==
Steve Rogers grew up in Brooklyn during the Great Depression, a scrawny child protected from neighborhood bullies by his best friend "Bucky" Barnes. Horrified by newsreel footage of the Nazis in Europe, Rogers was inspired to enlist in the Army around the time that the United States entered World War II. However, because of failing the physical test, he was rejected. Refusing to work in factories, he reattempted enlistment several times. His luck changed during another visit to a Recruitment Center when Military Sergeant Dugan recruited him for Project: Rebirth, after hearing Rogers' pleas. After voluntarily subjecting to surgery, steroid treatments, and other experimental treatments supervised by Doctor Erskine, Rogers became the first genetically-enhanced super-soldier. During the final treatment, he noticed a suspicious soldier focusing on him instead of standing guard. The shady man revealed himself as a Nazi spy sent to murder Rogers in the event that he survived the entire experiment. Rogers stopped him from destroying the experiment, but not before the spy murdered Doctor Erskine and other soldiers who attempted to stop him. Fully committing himself to the American war efforts, Rogers bid farewell to his sweetheart Gail Richards, becoming Captain America.

For the next three years, he underwent numerous covert operations, often accompanied by Bucky, now a war photographer, and sometimes alongside James "Lucky Jim" Howlett. During one mission, Captain America was able to infiltrate Arnim Zola's facility and kill his first experimental monster, which Zola dubbed "Siegsoldat" ("Victory soldier"). The experiment's dead body then fell on Zola, seemingly killing the latter. During one of his few leaves he met up with Gail and they spent the night together, which resulted in her becoming pregnant. He would later come into battle with Herr Kleiser, who possessed a prototype atomic bomb, made with alien technology, and was meant to target the White House. Captain America managed to get to the bomb as it was launched. In a successful attempt to stop it in mid air, he fell into the sea and was lost, presumed dead.

=== The Ultimates ===
Years later, Captain America was found in the Arctic Ocean, frozen in a block of ice, and was revived. Initially he thought S.H.I.E.L.D. were a group of Nazi soldiers who had captured him, but eventually realized that he was in a different time after seeing a modern New York City. He discovers that his best friend Bucky Barnes is now married to his fiancée and that all of his loved ones are dead.

After catching up to his new era, Captain America is inducted into the Ultimates, the superhero task force maintained by S.H.I.E.L.D. Soon after, the Ultimates are faced with the Hulk. Rogers was able to put down the Hulk briefly during combat. When he was about to inject the Hulk with an antidote, the Hulk made a surprise attack and broke the needle and the Hulk then began beating Cap, until Thor came to the rescue. After the Hulk had reverted to Bruce Banner, Cap knocked the former out and had Banner taken back to the Triskelion.

After learning that his teammates Hank and Janet Pym's quarrels with each other had left Janet hospitalized and nearly dead, Rogers tracked the now fugitive Hank to a bar and engaged him in combat, emerging victorious. He then takes Janet flowers and other gifts, but she was not amused by his actions and rejected his gifts. Rogers soon discovered that his nemesis, Herr Kleiser, had survived World War II and was an alien soldier. This was why he would always seem to survive, Cap saying that he has killed Kleiser "twice". When Kleiser resurfaced, the two resumed their enmity. During the Chitauri invasion, Rogers fought Kleiser in combat, but was unable to defeat him due to his regeneration abilities. When the Hulk was dropped into their battle, Captain America convinced the Hulk that Kleiser was "hitting on Betty", causing the Hulk to mutilate and then eat Kleiser. After the successful battle against the Chitauri, Rogers danced with Janet and a relationship between them bloomed. The relationship would later become sour as Rogers's 1940s personality created a generation gap, causing Janet to secretly go back to her ex-husband.

=== Ultimate War ===
During the events of Ultimate War, the Ultimates battle with the X-Men after Magneto was found alive and members of The Brotherhood of Mutants bombed the Brooklyn Bridge. S.H.I.E.L.D. believe the X-Men have teamed up with the Brotherhood. Captain America then vows that he will kill Magneto. Later the X-Men are framed to make it look like they teamed up with Magneto. The Ultimates with the support of numerous S.H.I.E.L.D agents succeed in capturing the X-Men and Professor Xavier is taken into S.H.I.E.L.D. custody.

=== Ultimate Six ===
During the Ultimate Six story arc Captain America leads the Ultimates in the arrests of Electro and Kraven the Hunter. Later those two–along with the Sandman, Doctor Octopus, and the Green Goblin—escape from S.H.I.E.L.D. He becomes very disheartened when he finds out that these villains were all a result of trying to duplicate the Super Soldier serum. During an attack on the White House lawn, Captain America wrestled with Spider-Man with neither out-powering the other. He then explained the truth to Spider-Man that his aunt was safe with S.H.I.E.L.D. Captain America then fought the Goblin landing several hits while not being hit once. The Ultimates and Spider-Man defeat the five villains and they are taken back into custody.

=== The Ultimates 2 ===
Cap and the Ultimates were later under fire from the press and public due to the belief that Thor had revealed that Bruce Banner was indeed the Hulk. In a meeting with Thor, Thor brought up the fact that Captain America killed many people and still goes to church, saying that he's confused with his morals. The Ultimates fought Thor and eventually captured him when his power belt was removed by Quicksilver. From then on the Ultimates became involved in foreign affairs wherein America attempted to control Third World countries' nuclear resources.

The Ultimates' actions led to Third World countries forming their own superhuman team, dubbed "the Liberators". Captain America was framed by Black Widow for the assassination of Hawkeye's family and was hastily subdued and arrested when he was visiting Bucky for consolation after his relationship with Janet ended bitterly for him. He was imprisoned in the Triskelion. When the Liberators attacked the United States, he was freed by the Wasp and defeated multiple copies of the Schizoid Man rather than killing him while escaping the prison. He and the Wasp soon reached the White House where they met with Hawkeye, Nick Fury, the Scarlet Witch and Quicksilver. Captain America dueled with his Liberators counterpart, The Colonel, and emerged victorious after stabbing the Colonel in the chest with one end of the double-bladed energy sword that the Colonel used.

After the Liberators are defeated, Steven Rogers somberly looked over the Colonel's body being transferred away by S.H.I.E.L.D., and thought of what he said to him about America's current role in the world. Seeing how having the Ultimates working with the United States government "policing" the world would produce similar results to their battle against the Liberators, Rogers and his team decided to leave S.H.I.E.L.D. and to continue to work as an independent team instead.

=== Post Liberators ===
After the Liberators short occupation, Captain America helped in the rebuilding of New York City until he found out that his old Nazi nemesis Arnim Zola did not die; instead the O.S.S. rescued him so as to harvest his intellect on the post-war super soldier program. Later they mapped his brain and created an artificial intelligence out of it before the tumors he had could degrade his mind. A white survivalist group called the "Marauders" attacked the military base where Zola's AI was being held and stole this intelligence, along with some other weaponry. Cap was furious at this and immediately went with the Falcon to Missouri to stop the Marauders and Zola. Unknown to Cap, Zola was then able to convince the leader of the "Marauders" to allow Zola to experiment on him. Zola mutated the man until he was approximately 20-foot (6.1 m) tall and installed armor plating (and Zola's AI brain) on him with a hologram of Zola projected from the chest. He then took over the "Marauders" and got them to gather people for his experiments. Once they found the Marauder's camp Cap held off the marauders and Zola's new monster Seigsoldat-X while the Falcon freed the Prisoners. Together with the freed prisoners they tore apart Seigsoldat-X until all that remained was the Arnim Zola AI whereupon, Captain America collapsed a support strut onto the Zola AI, finally bringing an end to the Nazi.

=== The Ultimates 3 ===
Before the events of the Liberators' attack, Steve befriended T'Challa, the Black Panther, and trained him in preparation for making him a member of the Ultimates. As the team's deputy leader, Rogers was uncomfortable with the notion of working with a man that he knew so little about. After Steve alarmingly discovered that T'Challa's throat was heavily damaged and that these injuries caused his muteness, he pressed Fury for more information. Fury lied about the origin of T'Challa's scars, and about T'Challa's history with the Weapon X Program, while also telling him that everything about the "Black Panther" was classified.

Captain America eventually established a means of communicating with T'Challa and learned of the man's desire to return to Wakanda to see his father. Since no one but Cap had ever seen T'Challa's true face, he decided to take his place in the Ultimates, enabling the real Black Panther the chance to return home.

Following the Ultimates' separation with S.H.I.E.L.D., Rogers secretly adopted the identity of the Black Panther. Eventually his secret was blown when Juggernaut literally beat Rogers's costume off of him. Iron Man and the Wasp arrived with Cap's shield and uniform. He then led the Ultimates against their robotic doppelgangers.

=== Ultimatum ===
Captain America drowned when Magneto's Ultimatum Wave hit New York. While in Valhalla, Thor appeared to save the life of his love, Valkyrie, and traded his own life for Valkyrie and Steve Rogers. Cap then led a team of Ultimates, while Jean Grey led a team of X-Men against Magneto and vowed to not let Thor's sacrifice be in vain. Magneto was defeated and the world began its rebel against mutants.

=== Post Ultimatum ===
Shortly after defeating Magneto, Captain America, Iron Man, and the military are searching for survivors in the ruins of New York City. Captain America finds the maskless Spider-Man in the rubble and digs the latter out. Later while the X-Men dig graves for the fallen, Sabretooth, Mystique, and Assemble arrive, claiming that they have come to pay their respects. However, Jean Grey blames them for the destruction, and a fight ensues. Captain America arrives, decapitating Assemble and stating that he also came to pay respect to the fallen X-Men.

=== The Red Skull and the Avengers ===
Months after Ultimatum, Captain America and Hawkeye fought a group of AIM terrorists at the Baxter Building who were stealing the building's valuable and powerful technologies. After defeating a majority of the terrorists, Cap encountered the Red Skull who easily beat him. The Red Skull then shockingly revealed to Rogers that he was his own son before throwing him out of a helicopter, which Cap was saved by Hawkeye.

After learning that the Red Skull's words to him were true and that his mother is Gail Richards, Captain America decided to personally confront his son, in which he abandoned the Ultimates and attacked S.H.I.E.L.D. agents in the process. Rogers later infiltrate the Army's computer database and discovered the truth of the Red Skull. Sometime later Captain America was in Paris, France for his own reasons. Rogers created a plot to which he would place Fury's Ultimates who were coming for him to capture him, with tracers, and allow him to later find his son, whom the Avengers were also in pursuit. Cap fought the Avengers, managing to defeat all of them. He was subsequently subdued and captured by the Avengers. But this was all a part of his plan to get to the Red Skull as during the fight Cap managed to place tracers on War Machine, Red Wasp, and Black Widow.

Escaping the French S.H.I.E.L.D. guards, Cap jumped into a tele-plane (a jet which teleports), to where the Avengers were fighting the Red Skull in Alaska. When he arrived, Red Skull, who was wielding the Cosmic Cube, subdued Rogers's jet. However, Cap ordered Hawkeye the coordinates for the Red Skull's position in which he had the jet teleport to the Red Skull and fatally impale his son on the tele-plane's nose. After the Red Skull was in custody, Rogers emotionally bore witness to Gail being briefly reunited with their dying son.

=== New Ultimates ===
Steve Rogers is currently a member of the New Ultimates, and helped Valkyrie, Zarda, Iron Man and Hawkeye fight off an attack from the Defenders, who managed to steal Thor's hammer before they retreated.

=== Ultimate Captain America series ===
Rogers learns that the Captain America project was maintained after he was lost in World War II. A more aggressive successor was selected for USA operations during the Vietnam War. The "1960s Captain America" (Frank Simpson) has returned and is not pleased with the return of the World War II Cap and seeks to make himself the only active Cap. Rather than kill Rogers, Simpson instead beats him to the point of collapse. Steve wakes up two days later in the French hospital where he is given a briefing by SHIELD Director Danvers about Simpson.

Frank Simpson's background is similar to the circumstances of Steve Rogers. Swept up in nationalistic pride, he attempted to join the United States Army in order to serve overseas, but due to his original physical stature he is rejected. He is then inducted into a secret program similar to that of "Project: Rebirth". Due to the formula of the Super Soldier Serum having died with the death of Dr. Erskine, he went through a painful combination of steroids as well as physical and psychological training in order to prepare for his assignment. Danvers reveals that originally, Simpson was overjoyed about serving his country and amassed a high enemy casualty count. But then the psychological pressure began to wear down on him and after an operation for the Phoenix Program he simply disappeared.

Rogers, sensing that Carol told him this in order for him to make it look like he went AWOL, subdued Danvers and left to hunt down Frank Simpson. Once in Vietnam, Rogers's search for Simpson results in being told about a secret village deep in the Vietnamese forest. Unfortunately, the source of this news along with the rest of the village has a synthesis of the Super Soldier Serum via Simpson's blood flowing through them and Steve is captured and taken prisoner. Day after day he is physically and psychologically tortured and Simpsons attempts to brainwash him with anti-American diatribes.

One day two S.H.I.E.L.D. employees sent to rescue Steve are captured and later executed because they are mistaken for assassins. Steve upon seeing this begins to pray and Simpson decides to indulge in his beliefs before executing him. The page then fades to black as Simpson enters to execute Steve, but with a sound of physical pain emanating from the prison cell.

The sound of pain was the result of Frank screaming after having snake venom spat directly into his eyes from Steve. After a lengthy hand-to-hand fight with an argument about morality, Steve was able to emerge victorious over Simpson. Aware of the fact that he was surrounded by gun toting villagers with Super Soldier Serum flowing in their veins, he warns them that if they persisted in aiming to kill him, he will treat them as enemy combatants and show them no mercy. After the surrender of the villagers, a rescue by S.H.I.E.L.D., and some time to recuperate, Steve is seen having a beer with Hawkeye where he tells Hawkeye that he did not know if he would make it out of that jungle alive and it was God that sent him the cobra. Hawkeye intimates that the Devil is not a possibility. Feeling the need to put Frank on the right path and to lead him on the right path, Rogers visits Simpson in the Triskelion where he is hospitalized under supervision and begins to read the Bible to him.

=== Ultimate Comics Ultimates ===
Ultimate Cap is largely absent during the series of events initiated by Reed Richards, leading to the destruction of Washington and death of POTUS Barack Obama. He returns to assist new President Howard during the events of "Divided they Fall." The US is on the brink of civil war as some States decide to leave the Union, and the legitimacy of President Howard is being put into question.

Captain America takes on the role of being the President of the United States after being made a write-in candidate and reunites the warring states of America."

=== Return ===
When the Maker collaborated with High Evolutionary to destroy the Superflow that kept the different universes separate in order to merge them into one reality, the Ultimates members Captain America, Iron Man, Giant-Man, Wasp, and Hulk were revived where they were to help Eternity fight the First Firmament. When Earth-616's version of the Ultimates arrived on Counter-Earth to confront Maker about his actions, he ordered the Earth-1610 Ultimates to attack. As both versions of Ultimates concluded that there is no reason to fight each other, Maker killed the Earth-1610 Captain America for disobeying his orders.

Captain America later turns up alive with the Ultimates when it is shown that Earth-1610 has been recreated.

However, following the events of Absolute Carnage and King in Black, when The Maker finally finds passage back to his native dimension via a chronal Portal gateway of his own invention, as well as utilizing the codexes of many of the Symbiotes he'd obtained, Earth-1610, he finds his alternate New York devastated and burning from an undisclosed cataclysm. As such, the fate of Ultimate Captain America, as well as all the rest of the Ultimate Universe's superheroes and villains, or even populists, are left unknown.

== Powers and abilities ==
Like his Earth-616 counterpart, Ultimate Captain America underwent the super soldier procedure which turned him into America's first super soldier. On a number of occasions characters have described his strength as enhanced (Nick Fury described him as being able to bench press a Toyota). He has been shown bending steel with his bare hands, catching a tree heavy enough to crush a Jeep. He is also shown jumping large distances, and the Ultimate Red Skull, when he was fourteen and scientists said he had abilities comparable to his father, is shown running alongside a motorcycle.

Captain America is also shown to have fast healing while nowhere near as powerful as Wolverine and Sabretooth's, in "Blade vs the Ultimates" a remembrance by Cap shows scientists saying he can heal gunshots and knife wounds in hours. Cap himself in Ultimates volume 1 says he should be able to heal broken bones in about a day or two.

== Other versions ==
=== Secret Wars (2015) ===
During the Secret Wars storyline, a variation of the Ultimate Captain America resides in the Battleworld domain called the Kingdom of Manhattan where he also co-exists with a variation of his Earth-616 counterpart.

== In other media ==
=== Television ===
- Elements of Ultimate Captain America are seen in The Avengers: Earth's Mightiest Heroes amalgamated with the Skrull Pitt'o Nili while impersonating Steve Rogers / Captain America.

=== Film ===
- Elements of the character are seen in Ultimate Avengers and Ultimate Avengers 2 as a composite character of both his Earth-616 and Ultimate incarnations.
- Ultimate Captain America's character served as a major influence for Steve Rogers in the Marvel Cinematic Universe. His characterization is more in line with his traditional kinder self, but Captain America's costume, specifically his modernized suit in The Avengers, resembles his Ultimate iteration's suit.

=== Video games ===
- Ultimate Captain America's costume appears as an alternate costume for the mainstream Captain America in Marvel: Ultimate Alliance and Marvel Avengers: Battle for Earth.
- Ultimate Captain America appears in Spider-Man: Battle for New York with The Ultimates after Spider-Man battles with the Green Goblin.
