= Tyrone Cash =

- Tyrone Cash as depicted in Ultimate Avengers #10 (June 2010). Art by Leinil Francis Yu, Gerry Alanguilan, and Dave McCaig.

Publication information
- Publisher: Marvel Comics
- First appearance: Ultimate Comics: Avengers Vol. 2 #7 (April 2010)
- Created by: Mark Millar; Leinil Francis Yu

In-story information
- Alter ego: Leonard Williams
- Species: Human gamma-mutate
- Team affiliations: Ultimate Avengers; S.H.I.E.L.D.
- Notable aliases: The First Hulk
- Abilities: Genius-level intellect; Superhuman strength, stamina, durability, and speed; Healing factor

Tyrone Cash (Leonard Williams) is a supervillain appearing in American comic books published by Marvel Comics. The character is depicted in the Ultimate Marvel universe, where he is a member of The Ultimates and is described as being The First Hulk prior to Bruce Banner.

== Publication history ==
Tyrone Cash first appeared in Ultimate Comics: Avengers Vol. 2 #7 and was created by Mark Millar and Leinil Francis Yu.

== Fictional character biography ==
Leonard Williams is a professor at Cambridge University who has an unspecified disability that forces him to use crutches to walk. At Cambridge, Williams works with Bruce Banner to recreate the super soldier formula. He becomes Banner's "mentor", having allegedly taught him "everything he knows." Williams disappears in an unexplained occurrence in which several people are killed, and comes to be considered a missing person.

Unbeknownst to the public, Leonard Williams became the first Hulk and assumed the identity of Tyrone Cash. Unlike Bruce Banner, Cash retains his mind in his Hulk form. The years he was "missing", Cash was monitored by S.H.I.E.L.D., killing numerous people throughout Africa and Asia before becoming a gangster in South America. 16 years later, Nick Fury sends War Machine to retrieve him and recruit him into the Ultimates. Cash initially refuses the offer and threatens to quickly rebuild his crime empire if War Machine ruins it. Cash only stops fighting after War Machine offers to tell his family that he is still alive.

The first assignment given to Cash and his fellow Avengers is to take out the enigmatic and deadly Ghost Rider. In an attempt to "get the jump on" Ghost Rider the Avengers and S.H.I.E.L.D. agents stand guard at an airport. Ghost Rider eventually arrives to capture, and inevitably kill, his target. Ghost Rider rips a man from his plane and quickly rides off, but his escape is cut short by a well placed rocket courtesy of Hawkeye.

Tyrone Cash is discovered to be behind the sale of S.H.I.E.L.D.-owned super-soldiers on the black market. After the Avengers attempt to take him down and arrest him, Cash confesses that he was secretly taking orders from Carol Danvers and that she has been selling S.H.I.E.L.D. secrets for years. Cash is taken down by Blade, who hypnotizes him and drains the Hulk serum from his body. Blade brings Cash to the Helicarrier, where he is killed by Nick Fury.

== Powers and abilities ==
Using a pill that contains a perfected version of his Hulk Serum, Tyrone Cash has immense strength, stamina, durability, and speed, as well as regenerative capabilities, which are similar to those from the Hulk. Cash also has shown to be a very skilled scientist.

== Other versions ==
An alternate universe version of Tyrone Cash from Earth-15513 appears in Secret Wars as a member of the Thor Corps on Battleworld.
