= Ultimate Comics: Avengers =

2009 Marvel comic book series

Publication information
- Publisher: Marvel Comics
- Schedule: Monthly
- Format: Ongoing series
- Genre: Superhero
- Publication date: October 2009 – September 2011
- No. of issues: 24

Creative team
- Written by: Mark Millar
- Penciller(s): Carlos Pacheco; Leinil Francis Yu; Steve Dillon; Stephen Segovia
- Inker(s): Danny Miki; Dexter Vines; Allen Martinez; Thomas Palmer; Gerry Alanguilan; Jason Paz; Edgar Tadeo; Jeff Huet; Andy Lanning
- Letterer: Cory Petit
- Colorist(s): Justin Ponsor; Laura Martin; Dave McCaig; Frank Martin; Matt Hollingsworth

Ultimate Comics: Avengers is a comic book published by Marvel Comics that began in August 2009 as part of the relaunch of the Ultimate Universe under the "Ultimate Comics" imprint. It is a direct follow up to the events of "Ultimatum." The series was written by Mark Millar, creator of The Ultimates and Ultimate X-Men, and co-creator of Ultimate Fantastic Four.

== Background ==
=== Format ===
The series takes place in the Ultimate Universe and features a wide range of characters. The comic was drawn by a new artist roughly every six issues, with Carlos Pacheco, Leinil Francis Yu, and Steve Dillon pencilling the first, second, and third story arcs, respectively. The series then crossed over with Ultimate Comics: Spider-Man as part of the Death of Spider-Man storyline, where it was drawn by Yu and Stephen Segovia.

Prior to the beginning of the series, writer Mark Millar explained that he planned to use character ideas that went unused in the first two Ultimates series, saying, "I always liked the idea of doing like five years worth of Ultimates stories, and to me that's 60 issues, but it became 26 issues ... but I had those overhanging ideas. I love the idea of Tony having a teetotaling older brother who despised him and always wore white suits instead of Tony's dark suits ... I like the idea of going a bit deeper into the characters. You meet Bruce Banner's teachers and Nick Fury's ex-wife. Just seeing what was going on in the background really."

=== Cast ===
During the first arc, the Avengers consisted of War Machine, Nick Fury, Hawkeye, Gregory Stark, Red Wasp, Nerd Hulk, the Spider, and Black Widow. At the end of the arc, Red Wasp left the team.

In the second arc, the Punisher and Tyrone Cash "join" the team. At the end of the arc, the Punisher left the team.

In the third arc, Blade and Perun join the team. At the end of the arc, Perun and Nerd Hulk die.

In the fourth arc, The Punisher rejoins the team while Black Widow leaves the team to join the New Ultimates. Gregory Stark, Spider, and Cash betray the team to take control of S.H.I.E.L.D. At the end of the arc, Cash, Spider, and Stark die, and Black Widow is appointed as the new leader of the Avengers.

== Storyline ==
=== The Next Generation ===
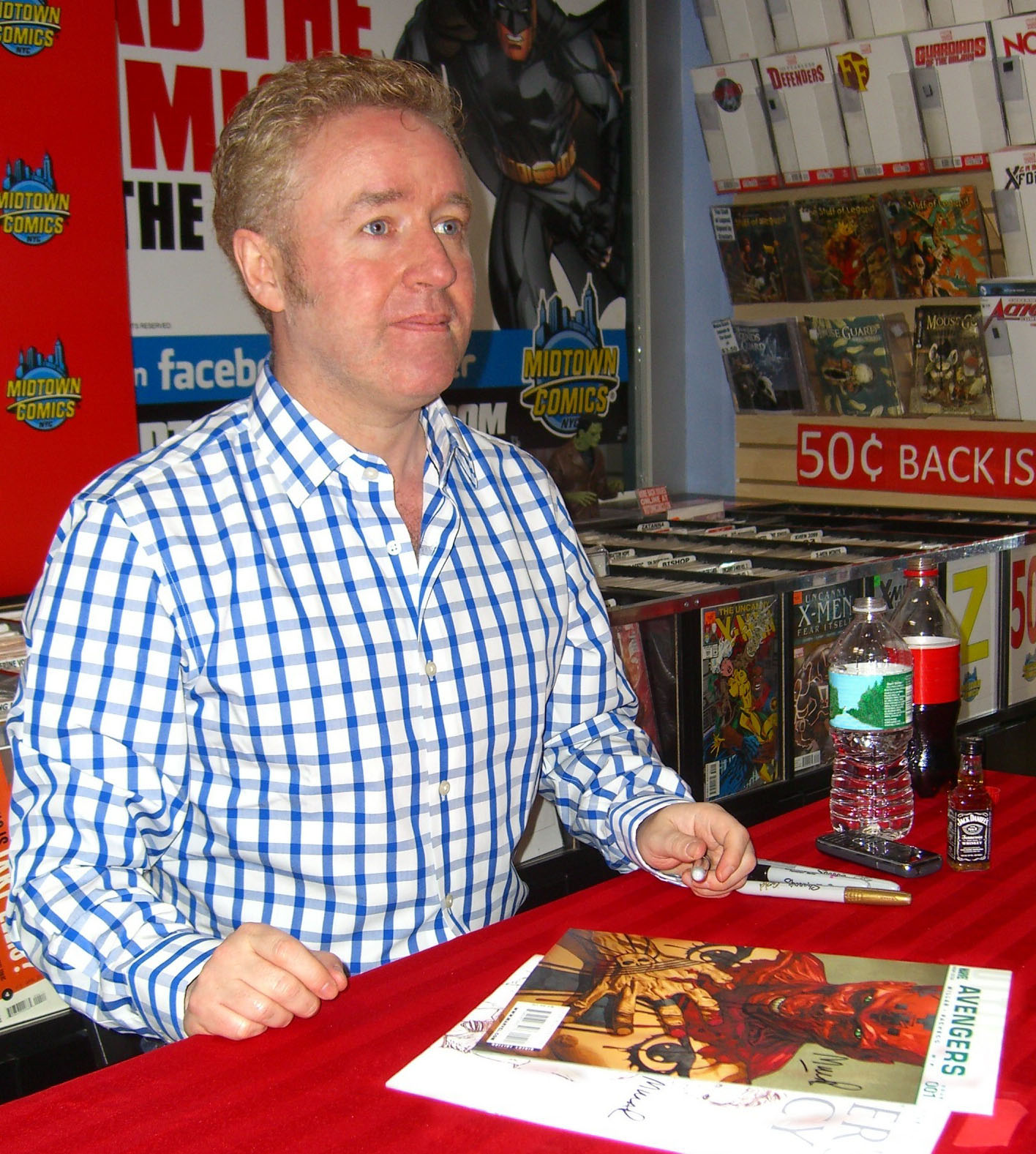
Writer Mark Millar signing a copy of the first issue during an appearance at Midtown Comics in Manhattan.

Three weeks after the events of "Ultimatum," Hawkeye reports that Captain America has "gone rogue". A flashback to the previous day shows that the two had been fighting a group of A.I.M. terrorists, who had just raided the Baxter Building of powerful technology. After defeating a majority of the terrorists, Captain America encounters the Red Skull, who reveals that he is Captain America's son. Hawkeye jumps to Captain's rescue as the A.I.M terrorists escape with a stolen Cosmic Cube. Later, Hawkeye tries to convince his partner that the Red Skull was lying, but Captain America violently abandons the team, attacking S.H.I.E.L.D. agents in the process. Nick Fury later confirms that the Red Skull is the illegitimate son of Captain America and Gail Richards. It is further revealed that shortly after his birth, the Red Skull was taken by government officials and raised at a secret facility where he, having inherited the abilities of his father, was trained to become a super soldier. He eventually rebelled and escaped the facility after killing 247 workers and mutilating his own head. Fury suggests that Carol Danvers initiate "Project Avengers" and recruit a team of superhumans to find Captain America.

Fury meets with Gregory Stark to discuss and observe the new team of superhumans tasked with apprehending Captain America. These "Avengers" include Black Widow/Monica Chang (Fury's ex-wife), Red Wasp, War Machine, and an intelligent clone of the Hulk. The new team soon tracks Captain America down and a fight ensues. After a fierce battle, the team plans an attack on A.I.M. However, the Red Skull has already used the Cube to kill the A.I.M agents guarding the facility by ordering them to eat each other. Meanwhile, Captain America manages to steal a teleporting aircraft before confronting the Red Skull. He manages to arrive at the exact location where the Red Skull is standing and impales him through the chest. The Red Skull is taken to a hospital and kept alive long enough for Gail, his mother, to say goodbye. The Red Skull explains to Fury that all he wanted to do with the Cosmic Cube was simply turn back time and lead a normal life, rather than the one he was given. Red Wasp then enters the room dressed as a doctor and shoots Red Skull in the head, killing him.

A short time later, Fury reveals to Gregory Stark that he plans on "getting [his] old job back".

=== Crime and Punishment ===
Captain America goes undercover as a Russian crime lord in order to capture the Punisher. Instead of executing him, however, Nick Fury and the Black Widow secretly offer him a place on their new Avengers team. Meanwhile, War Machine is sent to South America to find a gangster known as Tyrone Cash. A former partner of the Hulk, Cash also possesses Hulk-like strength and invulnerability while retaining his intelligence. He is eventually blackmailed by War Machine to join the new Avengers team. After this team is fully assembled, Nick Fury informs them that their current target is Ghost Rider, who has made a pact with Satan to seek revenge on a biker gang. The gang killed John and his girlfriend Roxanne as part of a satanic ritual in exchange for wealth and power. The leader of the bikers, Michael Blackthorne, is the vice-president, who made an executive order to the Avengers to stop the Ghost Rider from killing him.

Although the Avengers defended the vice-president at the White House, Blackthorne, in desperation, makes another deal with Satan, becoming Vengeance. Both Ghost Rider and Vengeance fight in downtown Washington, D.C., with the Avengers being unable to stop the altercation. Ghost Rider drags Blackthorne into a church, which turns them both back into human form. This allows the Punisher to finish off the Vice President, while Blaze is allowed to leave. The Punisher confronts Hawkeye and begs him to allow him to leave as well, arguing that he never hurt anyone who did not have it coming. Hawkeye punches him in the face, knocking out a molar in which a tracking implant was located, allowing him to escape twenty minutes later.

=== Blade vs. the Avengers ===
When super-humans start disappearing, Fury's black-ops team and the vampire hunter Blade discover it to be the work of a blood-sucking human species. The vampires' goal is to turn the superhuman population into their own kind in order to take over the world, including Nerd Hulk, a new Daredevil, and Stick. Their main focus point is the Triskelion due to its large population of super-humans and detained illegal superhuman experiments. When the vampires invade the Triskelion, S.H.I.E.L.D. attempts to fight back to no-avail. New recruit and ex-Liberator Perun is killed during the conflict. Soon after, Captain America uses Perun's hammer to teleport the Triskelion and its battlefield to Iran, where it is daytime; this successfully kills the vampires. The event was captured in live television and created a huge media fuss.

=== Avengers vs. New Ultimates (Death of Spider-Man) ===
With the Triskelion having recently been transported to Iran, Thor is slowly teleporting S.H.I.E.L.D. personnel – including Iron Man, who recently had a relapse of his brain tumor – home to Manhattan. The New Ultimates, also having recently acquired Ant-Man and Black Widow, learn from Gregory Stark that New Prototype Super-Soldiers were stolen from one of his facilities. The team is then sent to Bulgaria to intercept the train believed to be transporting the stolen property.

The team manages to derail the train and witnesses one of the prototype Super-Soldiers, called Mimic, emerge from his containment unit and, shortly afterward, die a painful death. Captain America questions the conductor of the train, who reveals to them that he was hired to steal and transport the prototypes by Nick Fury.

Fury manages to recruit the Punisher (promising him the keys to every cell in the prison in which he is currently incarcerated) and Blade (promising to deliver to him the man who killed his mother, Deacon Frost). Hawkeye also gets recruited for Fury's mission.

Posing as civilians, the group observes the sale of Maximus, a still-gestating Prototype Super-Soldier. The team strikes and attempts to intercept the case containing Maximus; however, they are attacked by Tyrone Cash, the man responsible for the sale. War Machine attempts to neutralize Cash, with little success. Blade then intervenes and manages to hypnotize him, reducing him to his withered form. Cash then confesses to Fury that he is working for Carol Danvers, and that she has been selling secrets for years.

Iron Man wakes up after his surgery and has a bad feeling that something terrible is about to happen. He asks a hired model, dressed as a sexy nurse for his enjoyment, to contact his secretary to ready his Iron Man armor. Carol Danvers converses with Captain Britain, who is currently leading the task of transporting the Triskelion back to New York, when Nick Fury appears.

Danvers orders her men to attack, revealing that War Machine, hiding himself with technology that allows him to become invisible, is also there. Iron Man arrives in time to save Danvers but is forced into battle with War Machine. Blade appears among the chaos and knocks Danvers unconscious, proceeding to kidnap her with the help of Hawkeye. They are intercepted by Giant-Man and Black Widow while Captain America hunts down Nick Fury on the Queensborough Bridge and beats him almost to submission. The Punisher, watching from higher ground, decides to try and take out Rogers' knee caps with a sniper rifle. He takes a shot and instead hits Spider-Man, who pushed Rogers out of the way.

A squad of S.H.I.E.L.D. agents arrives at the bridge and, during the momentary confusion caused by Spider-Man's appearance, shoot and attempt to apprehend Fury. Filled with remorse, The Punisher begs the agents to "punish him" for shooting an innocent kid. He is then knock out by one of the agents. Captain America promises Spider-Man that his wound is not fatal and commends him for taking a bullet for him without a second thought, stating that Spider-Man will be the best out of all of them when older. War Machine then arrives and blows up the bridge, causing everyone but Spider-Man, who uses his ability to stick to surfaces, to fall into the water below. Thor arrives and attempts to rescue them, damaging War Machine in the process. Blade manages to take down Black Widow, only to then be severely wounded himself by Iron Man, who was unaware that Blade was not actually super-powered. Carol Danvers calls for backup when she is hit by a police cruiser.

While Nick Fury is in custody and Carol Danvers is taken to a S.H.I.E.L.D. hospital, the leadership of S.H.I.E.L.D. is given to Gregory Stark by the President of the United States. Gregory then takes Fury onto the Helicarrier U.S.S. Jimmy Carter where he reveals to him that he pitted the Ultimates against the Avengers. Stark, in fact, was supplying the rebels of rogue states with smuggled Super-Soldiers in order to help the Pro-Democracy forces, thus fueling his ambitious agenda to put Triskelions all over the world. He then has his men shoot Fury and leave him for dead.

Fury begins to transform, using the special pills he acquired from Tyrone Cash a few days prior, into a Hulk-type physique, thus protecting him from his wounds. The other Avengers, also having taken the pills, join Fury in confronting Gregory. However, Gregory reveals that he is prepared for any and all opposition to his plans by activating a nanite fleet in his body, imbuing him with superpowers. He easily defeats the Avengers and, causing the U.S.S. Jimmy Carter to tilt, hurdles all of them but Fury over the edge.

Meanwhile, in Pyongyang, North Korea, the revolution begins with many Super-Soldiers, led by The Spider, causing mayhem. The New Ultimates are alerted to this attack but are ordered to stand down by Gregory on the grounds that intervening would breach the U.N. Treaty. The Spider, revealing himself to be a Korean himself, grown in Gregory Stark's Lab for just this occasion, confronts the Korean Military. However, he is interrupted when the New Ultimates, going against Gregory's orders, show up with the Avengers.

A huge battle erupts between the Korean forces and the Ultimates and Avengers. When the Punisher confronts the Spider, Hawkeye intervenes and crushes the Spider with concrete, killing him. Before he can deal a fatal blow to Nick Fury, Gregory Stark, being informed that the Ultimates are in Korea, teleports there to confront them. He steals Thor's Hammer and easily takes down Thor and Captain America. When he is about to kill Giant-Man, however, Tony smashes him into the ground. The two brothers battle, but Gregory damages Tony's armor, leaving him unable to fight. In compensation, Tony uses an electro-magnetic pulse to deactivate Gregory's nanites, thus removing his powers. Thor, thinking quickly, summons lightning and horribly burns Gregory.

With the uprising in Korea having been stopped, it became known that Gregory's true target was Iran, where the Triskelion currently resides. Iran, now under democratic rule, allowed the Triskelion to remain there while work began building a new one in New York. Gregory was then taken off of life-support, and seemingly perishes.

Nick Fury meets with Carol Danvers and informs her that, by order of the President of the United States, she is being forced to resign as director of S.H.I.E.L.D. This is due to the fact that, under her watch, not only did Gregory Stark commit crimes against the United Nations, but Spider-Man was killed. Fury then takes up his old position as S.H.I.E.L.D. director, musing that Gregory Stark actually had some good ideas. Black Widow, with the referral of Fury, becomes the new leader of the Avengers.

== Collected editions ==
Ultimate Comics: Avengers has been collected in the following trade paperbacks:

Title	Material collected	ISBN
Volume 1: Next Generation	Ultimate Comics: Avengers #1-6	ISBN 0-7851-4097-2
Volume 2: Crime and Punishment	Ultimate Comics: Avengers 2 #1-6	ISBN 1-84653-465-8
Volume 3: Blade Vs. the Avengers	Ultimate Comics: Avengers 3 #1-6	ISBN 0-7851-4009-3
Avengers vs. New Ultimates: Death of Spider-Man	Ultimate Comics: Avengers vs. New Ultimates #1-6	ISBN 0-7851-5272-5

It has also been collected into omnibus form:

Title	Material collected	ISBN
Ultimate Comics Avengers by Mark Millar Omnibus	Ultimate Comics: Avengers #1-6; Ultimate Comics: Avengers 2 #1-6; Ultimate Comics: Avengers 3 #1-6; Ultimate Comics: Avengers vs. New Ultimates #1-6	ISBN 0-7851-6132-5

== See also ==
- Ultimates
- The Ultimates
- The Ultimates 2
- The Ultimates 3
- Ultimate Comics: New Ultimates
