= Iron Man (Ultimate Marvel character) =

Publication information
- Publisher: Ultimate Marvel (Marvel Comics)
- First appearance: Ultimate Marvel Team-Up #4 (July 2001)
- Created by: Brian Michael Bendis; Mike Allred; Mark Millar; Bryan Hitch (based upon the original character by Lee, Lieber, Heck & Kirby)

In-story information
- Alter ego: Antonio "Tony" Stark
- Team affiliations: Stark Industries; S.H.I.E.L.D. Ultimates; New Ultimates
- Partnerships: Captain America; Thor; War Machine
- Abilities: Genius-level intellect; A powered armored suit: Superhuman strength; Super-sonic flight; Energy blasts; Missiles; Superhuman durability and regenerative life support but sometimes powered by solar power

Iron Man (Antonio "Tony" Stark) is a fictional character appearing in American comic books published by Marvel Comics. The character is the Ultimate Marvel version of the superhero Iron Man, who first appeared in the fourth issue of Ultimate Marvel Team-Up, written by Brian Michael Bendis and drawn by Mike Allred. He later appeared in the Ultimates and often appears in other Ultimate Marvel titles.

In the Ultimate Marvel Universe, the character is a wealthy industrialist, billionaire playboy, genius inventor, business tycoon and world-renowned scientist, who created the Iron Man armor, an exo-suit with high-tech equipment and superhuman capabilities, which grants the wearer with abilities, such as super-strength, flight, enhanced durability and the ability to fire weaponized energy blasts and beams. Like his mainstream counterpart, he has a drinking problem, being commonly depicted as a charismatic and womanizing alcoholic, with a snarky and sarcastic sense of humour, who suffers from a life-threatening affliction; in this case an inoperable brain tumor. With a life expectancy anywhere between six months and five years, he chose to become a philanthropist and superhero, deciding to use the remaining time he has left to live, for a noble purpose. Another major difference from his mainstream counterpart is that this version of Iron Man has an Italian mother hence why he is called "Antonio".

While the character was never featured in his own ongoing series, Stark's early life and origins were initially explored in the Ultimate Iron Man miniseries written by science fiction author Orson Scott Card. However, this origin story is no longer considered canon in the Ultimate Marvel Universe and was retconned as only being a fictional Japanese anime version. On the other hand, the character's adult years have been covered mainly by Mark Millar (in his Ultimates work) and Warren Ellis.

== Fictional character biography ==
=== Ultimates ===
In the limited series The Ultimates, when Tony Stark first hears that Nick Fury is assembling a team of superheroes, he volunteers his services. After helping defeat the Hulk, Stark develops a friendship with Thor and Steve Rogers. Though he has many great accomplishments, during the first volume of the Ultimates, he remains unsure of himself, clearly shown when he is heavily beat down and throws up in his own helmet. He acts arrogant, but also constantly doubts his own abilities. In the last issue he seems to decide that he cannot continue fighting until a soldier asks, "If you don't do it, who will?". Later, he fights against the X-Men in Ultimate War, captures the Rhino in Ultimate Spider-Man, and fights along with Spider-Man himself in the Ultimate Six storyline.

Stark also appears in Ultimate Wolverine vs. Hulk, where he supports Wolverine being sent to kill Bruce Banner. Stark also criticizes the law being used to stop the Hulk, during which he mockingly suggests creating a Superhero Registration Law referencing the mainstream Stark's support of the Superhero Registration Act. The Ultimate Galactus trilogy also shows the first signs of an early friendship between Stark and Reed Richards (despite the age difference), in addition to him successfully sneaking aboard a Kree spacecraft in Ultimate Secret, and killing a clone of the Silver Surfer in Ultimate Extinction.

=== The Ultimates 2 ===
In The Ultimates 2, Tony Stark quickly falls in love and proposes to Natasha Romanova. Just prior to proposing, Stark gives her a black suit of armor, almost identical to his own. The flight test of the suit includes flying over her homeland, where Stark had paid the three million inhabitants of her hometown to stand in a field, spelling out his proposal, which she immediately accepts. When the Liberators invade America, Natasha shoots Edwin Jarvis and then tries to get Stark, at gunpoint, to transfer much of his fortune to her. However, Stark has ultimate control of the nanites in her bloodstream that allows her to interface with her armor. Using these nanites, Stark incapacitates Romanova and retrieves the enemy plans from her mind with the intention of fighting back against the Liberators. He takes "Iron Man 6", a massive helicarrier-sized ship armed with dozens of laser cannons and machine guns, and wipes out the air force of the Liberators in Washington, D.C. (as well as his opposite Liberator number Crimson Dynamo). He then heads to New York to aid the heroes there. After the battle Stark agrees to finance the now independent Ultimates, and seemingly very quickly gets over Natasha's betrayal with the help of a pretty blonde.

=== Ultimates 3 and Ultimate Human ===
Ultimate Power marks the first appearance of the independent Ultimates, fighting against an alternate universe Squadron Supreme. This soon follows with the start of Ultimates 3 which sees Stark becoming a full-blown alcoholic. A sex tape that he made with Natasha during their time together also makes it into the public, causing a PR nightmare for the rest of the Ultimates. In Ultimate Human, which was published around the same time, the focus is on Bruce Banner as he pleads with Stark to cure him of his Hulk affliction just before Ultimatum, which dealt with Magneto's attempt at complete destruction.

=== New Ultimates and Ultimate Armor Wars ===
After Ultimatum, the Ultimate Comics: Armor Wars mini-series featured Iron Man racing across the world to find his stolen armor in order to save the remains of his enterprise. In Ultimate Comics: New Ultimates, he began a relationship with Carol Danvers and fought against the returning Loki. In the pages of Ultimate Comics: Spider-Man, he was also involved with Captain America and Thor in training Spider-Man to become a better hero. During this time, his brother Gregory Stark became the new financial manager for the new Avengers team in Ultimate Comics: Avengers, which also featured Rhodey (Tony's former best friend) and a new Black Widow.

=== Ultimate Comics: The Ultimates ===
In Ultimate Comics: The Ultimates, Tony Stark is among the central characters and a leading member of the Ultimates. In "The Republic is Burning", he saves a now mortal Thor from the destruction of Asgard. With his Asgardian brethren exterminated by the Children of Tomorrow and Yggdrasil drained of the Odinforce, Thor is no longer a God and Stark takes it upon himself to help Thor resume his role as a God of Thunder. He reveals that he has been keeping Thor's harness and hammer (pieces of EUSS technology that gave him his powers in The Ultimates and The Ultimates 2) and gives it back to the mortal Thor, with some modifications. Stark joins Nick Fury's latest Ultimates roster alongside Thor, Spider-Woman, Hawkeye, Black Widow and Falcon.

Following the reunification of the United States, Tony Stark builds a new red-white-and-blue version armor under the name "Iron Patriot" which is badly damaged in a confrontation with the Dead Hand Hydra terrorist group, and is later cut in half during repairs by the Black Knight.

=== Ultimate Comics: X-Men ===
In Ultimate Comics: X-Men, following the establishment of the mutant nation of Utopia, Tony Stark is appointed as a liaison between Utopia and the United States by President Steve Rogers. Within Utopia, Stark assumes the role of business affairs and military consultant for the fledgling nation. With Kitty's help, he fakes an explosion in one of Utopia's greenhouses that seemingly destroys the 'super seed' developed by the mutants. Later he promises Kitty that once the attention has shifted away from Utopia, he will start releasing the seeds through back channels and have them freely distributed in accordance to Kitty's wishes.

=== Return ===
When the Maker collaborates with High Evolutionary to destroy the Superflow that separates the multiverse to merge all universes into one reality, the Ultimates members Captain America, Iron Man, Giant-Man, Wasp, and Hulk are revived and help Eternity fight the First Firmament. When Earth-616's version of the Ultimates arrive on Counter-Earth to confront Maker, he orders the Earth-1610 Ultimates to attack. As both versions of Ultimates conclude that there is no reason to fight each other, Maker kills the Earth-1610 Captain America for disobeying his orders. Iron Man and the remaining members of the Earth-1610 Ultimates leave to pursue Maker.

== Other versions ==
=== Secret Wars (2015) ===
During the Secret Wars storyline, a variation of Ultimate Iron Man resides on the Battleworld domain known as the Kingdom of Manhattan, where he co-exists with a variation of his Earth-616 counterpart.

=== Ultimate Universe ===
An alternate universe version of Iron Man appears in the Ultimate Universe imprint. This version is Howard Stark, who operates as Iron Man and is a business partner of Obadiah Stane. After Stane is killed, Stark and Reed Richards plot against the Maker by shutting down the force field surrounding the City. The City's power conduit surges and closes the City up, trapping Stark and the Maker inside.

== In other media ==
=== Film ===
- Elements of the character are incorporated into the version of Iron Man who appears in Ultimate Avengers and Ultimate Avengers 2, serving as a composite character of the character's Earth-616 and Ultimate incarnations.
- Ultimate Iron Man's original suit is seen in The Invincible Iron Man as one of the multiple armors of Tony Stark / Iron Man.
- Ultimate Iron Man's character served as a major influence for Tony Stark's characterization and personality in the Marvel Cinematic Universe. Additionally, Iron Man's Mark XVII Heartbreaker armor in Iron Man 3 and XLVII armor in Spider-Man: Homecoming resemble Ultimate Iron Man's design.

=== Video games ===
- Ultimate Iron Man's original armor appears as an alternate costume for the mainstream Iron Man in Marvel: Ultimate Alliance, Iron Man, Iron Man 2, Iron Man 3, and Marvel's Avengers.
- Ultimate Iron Man appears in Spider-Man: Battle for New York.
- Ultimate Iron Man's armor appears as a selectable style for the Iron Legion skin in Fortnite.
