= Ultimatum (comics) =

Ultimate Marvel storyline, 2009

- Cover of Ultimatum 1 (Nov, 2008), art by David Finch

Publication information
- Publisher: Marvel Comics
- Schedule: Monthly
- Format: Limited series
- Genre: Superhero
- Publication date: January – September 2009
- No. of issues: 5
- Main character(s): Brotherhood of Mutants; Fantastic Four; Spider-Man; X-Men; Ultimates

Creative team
- Written by: Jeph Loeb
- Penciller: David Finch
- Inker: Danny Miki
- Colorist(s): Steve Firchow; Peter Steigerwald; Guru eFX

"Ultimatum" is a 2009 comic book storyline published by Marvel Comics under its Ultimate Marvel imprint. It consists of a core five-issue eponymous miniseries written by Jeph Loeb and illustrated by David Finch that was published from January to September 2009, and a number of tie-in books. The storyline deals with Magneto's attempts to destroy the world following the apparent deaths of his children, Scarlet Witch and Quicksilver in The Ultimates 3.

The first issue of the core miniseries was the best-selling comic of January 2009, selling over 100,000 copies, though sales dropped with subsequent issues. Despite relatively strong sales, the miniseries received almost universally negative reviews upon its conclusion, as it holds a score of 4 out of 10 at the review aggregator website Comic Book Roundup. By contrast, the overall crossover storyline holds a score of 5.8 out of 10, whereas higher scores are held by the tie-in series, Ultimatum: Fantastic Four Requiem, Ultimatum: Spider-Man Requiem and Ultimatum: X-Men Requiem hold scores of 7, 7.7 and 6.3, respectively.

== History ==
The foreshadowing of the "Ultimatum" storyline began in late 2007 when Ultimate Power #8 featured a banner on its cover reading, "March on Ultimatum". The following year, a teaser advertisement for "Ultimatum" ran in all Marvel titles. It depicted a broken tombstone reading 2000-2008, with the 2008 piece broken from its place, indicating that the Ultimate Universe would be ending that year. In an interview on YouTube, artist David Finch said that Loeb would be bringing much to all of the Ultimate Universe to a close.

Loeb said in an interview with Comic Book Resources that the storyline would "hopscotch back and forth between the two books [Ultimate Fantastic Four and Ultimate X-Men] and conclude what I would like to say is the first chapter of the Ultimate Universe."

During the Marvel Ultimate Universe panel at the 2008 San Diego Comic-Con, Jeph Loeb said that Aron Coleite's run on Ultimate X-Men would tie-in to "Ultimatum", but did not indicate that the former series would end. While it was first reported in Wizard magazine that only one Ultimate Marvel title would be ending following the series, Ultimate X-Men, Ultimate Spider-Man, and Ultimate Fantastic Four were all canceled following the events of "Ultimatum".

The Ultimates continued under the title Ultimate Comics: New Ultimates after "Ultimatum", and is written by Jeph Loeb and drawn by artist Frank Cho. Mark Millar, writer and creator of The Ultimates, Ultimate Fantastic Four, and Ultimate X-Men, was the writer for a series that was introduced after "Ultimatum", Ultimate Comics: Avengers, which featured a rotating team of artists such as Carlos Pacheco, Leinil Francis Yu, and Steve Dillon. Ultimate Spider-Man was relaunched after the end of "Ultimatum", written by Brian Michael Bendis and drawn by artist David Lafuente, who provided the art for the third Ultimate Spider-Man Annual. Loeb also wrote a second series entitled Ultimate Comics: X, which dealt with mutants struggling under the new laws passed in the Ultimate Universe after the events of "Ultimatum".

== Storyline ==
=== Background ===
Elements of "Ultimatum"'s story were established in the Ultimates 3, Ultimate Power, and Ultimate Origins miniseries, all of which featured a banner reading "March on Ultimatum" on their covers. During "Ultimatum", the three Ultimate Marvel titles (Ultimate X-Men, Ultimate Spider-Man, and Ultimate Fantastic Four), featured tie-in stories about various characters and events that occur throughout "Ultimatum". The series mainly builds on the events of Ultimates 3, in which the villainous robot Ultron shoots and kills the Scarlet Witch. Ultron's rebellion and Wanda's death lead to a series of events which end with the apparent death of Wanda's brother, Quicksilver, who is shot by Hawkeye when Quicksilver uses his super-speed to intercept the bullet meant for his father. Magneto vows revenge on the Ultimates. Before escaping the Ultimates, Magneto is able to steal Thor's hammer which he uses, along with his magnetic abilities, to reverse the Earth's polarity. It is further revealed that Doctor Doom was manipulating these events.

=== Synopsis ===
A series of disasters befalls a few major cities: a lightning storm suddenly appears in New York City and a tsunami hits Manhattan. Mister Fantastic and the Invisible Woman attempt to make it back into the Baxter Building, while the Thing attempts to hold off a whale that crashed through a window. Yellowjacket breaks out of Tony Stark's mansion looking for the Wasp. In the flooded streets of New York City, Bruce Banner appears to have drowned only to turn into the Hulk. Spider-Man attempts to help in rescue efforts. As Beast and Nightcrawler are caught in the tsunami, Angel carries an unconscious Dazzler from underwater to the top of a building. Iron Man rescues Captain America, reporting that many people have died and that he does not know where the rest of the Ultimates are. The Invisible Woman uses a massive force field to push all the water back out of the city without affecting civilians or buildings, but this puts her in a coma. In Latveria, Doctor Doom leaves his castle and discovers that everyone except him has been frozen. Professor X states that millions have died and telepathically informs many of the world's superheroes that Magneto is responsible for the destruction, having made use of a doomsday attack that Xavier knew he had but never believed he would use. Magneto is then revealed to be in a floating citadel with Thor's hammer Mjolnir.

In the aftermath, the Human Torch is missing. Mister Fantastic searches for Namor, whom he believes to be responsible for the widespread destruction. Dazzler, Beast, and Nightcrawler are dead, and the rest of the X-Men begin searching for survivors. Hulk arrives and peacefully assists Spider-Man in rescue efforts. At the Triskelion, Iron Man arrives with an unconscious Captain America, who is put on life support. Hawkeye helps Yellowjacket search for the Wasp, but they discover the Blob eating her corpse. Enraged, the giant-sized Hank Pym bites off the Blob's head. Back at the Baxter Building, the Thing watches over a comatose Invisible Woman, whose powers lash out at him. Meanwhile, Doctor Doom and Zarda confront Reed Richards, and forge a plan to retrieve Nick Fury from the Supreme Power universe. Upon finding Valkyrie's lifeless body, Thor enters Valhalla to reclaim her soul. He is then confronted by Hela, who forces Thor to battle Hela's army of fallen warriors to reach Valkyrie. Captain America appears in Valhalla, implying that he has died. Meanwhile at Xavier's Institute for Gifted Children, Magneto confronts Professor X and tells him that the deaths of Quicksilver and Scarlet Witch have spurred him to exterminate the entire human race. When Professor X states that his motives have made him similar to Osama bin Laden, Pol Pot, and Adolf Hitler, Magneto kills Professor X and leaves.

As the X-Men mourn their dead, Jean Grey telepathically learns of Professor X's death and informs the others. At Magneto's citadel, a Jamie Madrox clone arrives with a bomb strapped to his chest accusing Magneto of turning on his own kind, but Magneto is not dissuaded from his genocidal path. In Valhalla, Thor sacrifices himself to save Valkyrie and Captain America from Hela. Captain America then wakes up, now healed, and announces that Thor is dead. A horde of Jamie Madrox's duplicates—one of many suicide-bomber hordes dispatched by Magneto to blow up targets all over the world—attack the Triskelion just as Yellowjacket arrives. He instructs Iron Man to take Wasp's body and find a file titled "The Jocasta Project". He then carries all the Madrox clones out to sea where he allows himself to be blown up with them. Captain America orders the Ultimates to gather all the remaining heroes and lead them in an assault on Magneto's citadel.

Kitty Pryde leaves to search for Spider-Man, who was caught in an explosion inside the Sanctum Sanctorum, the home of Doctor Strange. She and Spider-Woman find his mask, and assume he is dead.

When Dormammu appears, Strange confronts him. Dormammu, who is channeling the Human Torch's flame, kills Doctor Strange. Meanwhile in the Supreme Power universe, Richards, Doom, Zarda, and Arcanna approach the exiled Nick Fury. Fury reveals that he knew of Magneto's plan and forces Doctor Doom to reveal that he is responsible for the Scarlet Witch's death. Doom explains that he killed her in an attempt to overthrow humanity himself, but never expected Magneto to seek vengeance upon the world. Mister Fantastic and Zarda are outraged that Doom instigated Magneto's mass murder. Back in the Ultimate Universe, the Ultimates and Wolverine confront Magneto at his citadel. Angel also arrives and is immediately killed by Sabretooth. Hawkeye blinds Sabretooth by shooting him through the eye. Magneto's arm is cut off by Valkyrie who is trying to reclaim Thor's hammer. Magneto slashes Valkyrie's throat, but this does not kill her. Captain America attacks Magneto. In response, Magneto collapses the ceiling on them, trapping them in the rubble. He flees and cauterizes his arm with his magnetic abilities. He is confronted by Cyclops, Phoenix, Wolverine, Storm, Hawkeye, and Iron Man.

After controlling Cyclops' visor and Iron Man's lasers into hitting Wolverine, Magneto kills Wolverine by ripping the adamantium from his bones and affecting his cells in such a way that he cannot regenerate. Nick Fury arrives with Mister Fantastic, Doctor Doom, and Zarda, and implements his contingency plan. Using Jean's telepathy, Fury transmits his memories to Magneto, showing him that the existence of mutants was the result of a misguided genetic super-soldier experiment (the decades-ago merging of Nick Fury's super-soldier blood and the DNA of Wolverine, thereafter alternately known as "Mutant Zero") and not the "divine calling" that Magneto had long thought it was. Disillusioned, Magneto reverses the damage he had done to Earth's magnetic poles. Despite insisting that Professor X would have forgiven him, Cyclops disintegrates Magneto's head with his optic blast at Magneto's request. The heroes destroy the citadel and leave. Eight days later, the world has begun to recover from the devastation. Cyclops gives a speech in Washington D.C. before a crowd of anti-mutant protesters. He acknowledges Magneto's crimes, but pleads for peace between humans and mutants. He also announces that Congress is currently voting on a bill that will require all mutants to turn themselves in to the U.S. government or be shot on sight. However, Cyclops is fatally shot in the head by an unknown assassin. Meanwhile, Thing travels to Latveria and kills Doctor Doom after being informed by Reed Richards that in every one of millions of alternate scenarios he can come up with, the world suffers greatly under Doom's rule unless he is killed. At Mount Wundagore, Quicksilver is revealed to be alive and reveals that he had assassinated Cyclops. He then takes Magneto's helmet and swears to carry on his father's dream, all while in the presence of an unknown mastermind – a woman whose identity is hidden in the shadows.

=== Aftermath ===
Following the "Ultimatum" storyline, each Ultimate title was given a Requiem follow-up series or one-shot, dealing with the status of each book's characters in the aftermath of Ultimatum.

== Reception ==
=== Sales ===
The core Ultimatum miniseries enjoyed strong sales. The first issue was the #1 selling book for November 2008, with 114,230 books sold by Diamond. However, sales dropped with the second issue, which sold less than 75,000 copies. Over the course of its nine-month run, Ultimatum lost an estimated 27,482 readers.

=== Critical reception ===
The overall crossover holds a score of 5.8 out of 10 on the review aggregator Comic Book Roundup, based on 17 reviews. The core miniseries holds a score of 4 out of 10, based on five reviews. The tie-in series hold higher scores, with Ultimatum: Fantastic Four Requiem, Ultimatum: Spider-Man Requiem and Ultimatum: X-Men Requiem holding scores of 7, 7.7 and 6.3, respectively, based on 1, 2, and 1 reviews, respectively. The initial reviews of the core miniseries' earlier issues were mixed, with issue #1 holding a score of 6.3 out of 10 at Comic Book Roundup, based on 10 reviews, with the following four issues holding scores of 4.8, 3.7, 2.2 and 2.8, based on 8, 5, 6, and 6 reviews, respectively.

In reviews of the first issue, Zak Edwards of ComicBookBin took notice of Loeb's ability to relay characterization while plotting a catastrophic event, while Jesse Schedeen of IGN thought Loeb's characterization in the first issue was poor. Weekly Comic Book Review's Andrew C. Murphy gave the miniseries' first issue a B+, praising David Finch's art, while Ben Berger gave it a C, opining that there was too much exposition, but also praising Finch's art.

Criticism of Loeb's writing was more common in reviews of subsequent issues, and universal by the time of the series' conclusion. David Finch's art generally drew more praise, though even that element was not without its critics, with some reviewers taking issue with Finch's focus on characters' physical beauty over expressiveness, and more than one reviewer criticizing him for his depiction of Carol Danvers's breast size.

Schedeen gave the series' final issue a scathing review, saying, "Ultimatum is one of the worst comics I have ever read," and called it "the ultimate nightmare." Criticism of Loeb's writing centered on his dialogue, the number of characters he killed off, and inconsistent characterization and storytelling. Other points of criticism among these reviews also included the level of graphic violence, which included cannibalism, and the notion that the series was sold on the basis of its shock value.

Still others asserted the story lacked originality, and that the series would have been better suited to someone who had previously been more involved with the Ultimate Marvel line, such as Brian Michael Bendis or Mark Millar, particularly in light of Loeb's critically panned work on Ultimates 3.

== Collected editions ==
Title	Material collected	Published date	ISBN
Ultimatum: March On Ultimatum	Ultimate Fantastic Four/Ultimate X-Men Annual #1, Ultimate X-Men/Ultimate Fantastic Four Annual #1, Ultimate Captain America Annual #1, Ultimate Hulk Annual #1 and Ultimate Spider-Man Annual #3	February 2009	978-0785135647
Ultimatum	Ultimatum #1-5	October 2009	978-0785133001
Ultimatum: X-Men/Fantastic Four	Ultimate X-Men #98-100 and Ultimate Fantastic Four #58-60	May 2009	978-0785134329
Ultimatum: Spider-Man	Ultimate Spider-Man #129-133, and Annual #3	September 2009	978-0785141242
Ultimatum: Requiem	Ultimatum: Spider-Man Requiem, Fantastic Four Requiem, and X-Men Requiem	October 2009	978-0785139256
Ultimatum Companion	Ultimate Fantastic Four #58–60, Ultimatum Fantastic Four: Requiem, Ultimate Spider-Man #129–133, Ultimatum Spider-Man: Requiem #1–2, Ultimate X-Men #98–100, Ultimatum X-Men: Requiem, March on Ultimatum Saga, Marvel Spotlight: Ultimatum	May 2011	978-0785155072
