= Ultimate Comics: New Ultimates =

2010 Marvel Comics limited series

- Cover of the first issue of the series. Art by Frank Cho.

Publication information
- Publisher: Marvel Comics
- Schedule: Monthly
- Format: Limited series
- Genre: Superhero
- Publication date: May 2010 – March 2011
- No. of issues: 5

Creative team
- Written by: Jeph Loeb
- Penciller: Frank Cho
- Colorist: Jason Keith

Ultimate Comics: New Ultimates is a comic book limited series published by Marvel Comics that began in March 2010 as part of Marvel's "Ultimate Comics" imprint. The series was written by Jeph Loeb, writer of Ultimates 3 and Ultimatum. Members of the New Ultimates include Captain America, Thor, Valkyrie, Hawkeye, Black Panther, Shanna, Ka-Zar, and Princess Zarda.

== Synopsis ==
Eight months after the Ultimatum Wave, the Defenders, having recently acquired superpowers, attack Iron Man and Hawkeye at the Triskelion facility. After a brief fight, Captain America, Zarda, and Valkyrie arrive to help. The Defenders then teleport away, stealing the great Mjöllnir from Valkyrie in the process. Meanwhile in Central Park, Shanna, Ka-Zar, and the Black Panther encounter Loki as he returns to Earth with the Enchantress and a swarm of monsters. At the same time, Hela offers Thor a return to Earth from Valhalla in exchange for a son. It is also revealed that Tony Stark and Carol Danvers, director of S.H.I.E.L.D., have become romantically involved.

== Collected editions ==
Ultimate Comics: New Ultimates has been collected into the following trade paperback:

Title	Material Collected	Published date	ISBN
Ultimate Comics New Ultimates: Thor Reborn	Ultimate Comics: New Ultimates #1-5	March 2011	978-1846534751

== See also ==
- The Ultimates (comic book)
- The Ultimates 2
- The Ultimates 3
- Ultimate Comics: Avengers
