= Ultimate End =

Marvel Comics limited series

- Ultimate End #5. Art by Mark Bagley

Publication information
- Publisher: Marvel Comics
- Format: Limited series
- Genre: Superhero
- Publication date: May 20 – December 16, 2015
- No. of issues: 5

Creative team
- Written by: Brian Michael Bendis
- Penciller: Mark Bagley

Ultimate End was a 2015 limited series by Marvel Comics, a tie-in for the Secret Wars crossover. It was written by Brian Michael Bendis and illustrated by Mark Bagley, and was the final comic book set in the Ultimate Marvel imprint.

== Plot ==
Several heroes of the Ultimate Marvel and the mainstream Marvel universes are in the same city. In many cases, this means multiple versions of a same character. It is not clear what event caused it, but the Thor corps forbids any investigation or attempt to fix things. The conflict escalates into an open fight between the characters from both universes, which is stopped by Miles Morales. Morales explains that the universes have been merged and kept merged on purpose by the nigh-omnipotent Dr. Doom, as a punishment for the previous times the heroes had stopped him. The fight is halted, and the heroes of both universes prepare for a fight against Doom.

== Creation ==
The Ultimate Marvel imprint was created in 2000, and lasted for 15 years. It had a fictional universe of its own, unconnected to the Marvel Universe of the rest of Marvel's comic books. The Secret Wars crossover was created to merge both universes into a single one, and end the imprint. Marvel PR's Chris D'Lando tasked it to writer Brian Michael Bendis and penciller Mark Bagley, who started the imprint with Ultimate Spider-Man. Bendis joked that he would hand the script soaked in tears. He said that the miniseries was not just a tie-in for Secret Wars, but an actual comic book event inside of another, and that it may have taken place anyway. He also pointed that he was glad that, with the miniseries, he could give a proper closure to the stories of most characters.

The series was first announced with a teaser image by Bendis, titled "the end", and starring the main characters of the Ultimate Marvel imprint, such as Ultimate Spider-Man, X-Men and Nick Fury. However, the teaser was misleading at the time, as several miniseries titled "the end" had been published in recent years. The layout of the image was similar to the cover of the first issue of Marvel Super Hero Contest of Champions, from 1982.

The ending of the story features Miles Morales living in the mainstream Marvel Universe, setting up the new Spider-Man comic book. The cast of the Ultimate Spider-Man comics is kept as well, including Morales' mother, who had been murdered in an older story arc.

== Reception ==
Matt Little of CBR praised the fact that the miniseries could be understood easily as a stand-alone read, without requiring much familiarity with the Secret Wars main plot. He also welcomed the inclusion of the Ultimate versions of Cloak and Dagger, and pointed out the slow pace of the narrative, a common technique for Bendis.

== Collected edition ==
Title	Material collected	Published date	ISBN
Ultimate End	Ultimate End #1–5	January 2016	978-0785198901
