= The Ultimates (comic book) =

2002–04 Marvel limited series

- Cover for The Ultimates #1 (March 2002). Art by Bryan Hitch.

Publication information
- Publisher: Marvel Comics
- Schedule: Monthly
- Format: Limited series
- Genre: Superhero
- Publication date: March 2002 – April 2004
- No. of issues: 13
- Main character(s): Ultimates; Nick Fury; Chitauri

Creative team
- Written by: Mark Millar
- Artist: Bryan Hitch

Collected editions
- The Ultimates Vol. 2: Homeland Security: ISBN 0-7851-1078-X
- The Ultimates: ISBN 0-7851-1082-8

The Ultimates is a 2002-2004 thirteen-issue comic book limited series written by Mark Millar with art by Bryan Hitch. The series introduces the titular Ultimates, the Ultimate Marvel incarnations of the Avengers.

== Publication history ==
The Ultimates debuted in March 2002, and ran for thirteen issues.

Bryan Hitch describes his Ultimates work as "widescreen, cinematic compositions" and has expressed his interest of translating his work for movies. This miniseries was affected by delays and the artist admits to having to work hard to recover from reputation as a slow artist after his work on the first Ultimates series stating "‘Cause I think people still now see me as an unreliable artist."

== Plot synopsis ==
General Nick Fury of the international peacekeeping agency S.H.I.E.L.D. establishes a strike force of government-sponsored superheroes when the President of the United States approves a new defense budget to combat the growing risk of the U.S. being attacked by supervillains. The team, dubbed the Ultimates, includes Tony Stark (aka Iron Man) and scientist couple Hank and Janet Pym (Giant-Man and the Wasp respectively) and take up residence in the Triskelion, an island laboratory run by S.H.I.E.L.D. Thor is offered a position in the Ultimates, but he declines unless the President agrees to triple the funds allocated to environmental issues in the budget. Bruce Banner is made the new science director, attempting to duplicate the super soldier serum. Bruce's ex-girlfriend Betty Ross is appointed as the team's Director of Communications. Bruce attempts to rekindle their relationship, but is constantly spurned and belittled. A S.H.I.E.L.D. research team discovers Captain America frozen in the Arctic and attempts to gain a sample of the serum from his body. Instead, Captain America is revived and offered a place in the Ultimates.

The Ultimates fail to gain major publicity and the government considers withdrawing the defense budget. In an attempt to create the team's first major fight, Bruce combines Captain America's super-soldier serum with the formula that turns him into the Hulk and injects it into his blood stream, transforming him into a larger, more powerful Hulk with gray skin. The Hulk goes on a murderous rampage through Manhattan searching for Betty, who is on a date with Freddie Prinze, Jr. The Ultimates intercept him and a battle ensues and Giant-Man is incapacitated early in the fight. The President doubles the international aid budget at the last second and Thor arrives to help the Ultimates. The Hulk is eventually subdued when the Wasp navigates her way into his brain and electrocutes his brain stem, reverting him back to his original self.

The following day, the Ultimates become celebrities and are lavished with media attention. The Hulk's real identity is hidden from the public and Bruce is kept in isolation while Betty tries to make amends with him for her behavior. Humiliated by his quick defeat in the battle, Hank takes his anger out on Janet and abuses her by forcing her to shrink down into her wasp form and assaulting her with bug spray and mind-controlled ants. Suspended from the Ultimates for this act, Hank flees to Chicago, but is followed by Captain America who brutally beats him and breaks his jaw. However, Janet lashes out at Captain America for this and defends Hank....even if he did abuse her.

Meanwhile, a dead alien organism is discovered and reports confirm that the creatures were involved in World War II. The creatures, referred to as the Chitauri, are revealed to be the ones who financed the Nazi regime in Germany during World War II in an attempt to take over the world and have been increasing in numbers for the past fifty years. General Fury enlists the aid of S.H.I.E.L.D. agents Black Widow and Hawkeye to kill several Chitauri disguised as humans. The duo kills dozens of Chitauri. Research shows that the Chitauri have a base in Micronesia.

The Ultimates, along with two former members of Magneto's Brotherhood of Mutant Supremacy, Quicksilver and Scarlet Witch, are sent in to destroy the base, but are surprised to find it abandoned once they arrive. Meanwhile, Janet discovers that the Chitauri have overrun the Triskelion and that the Ultimates are walking into a trap. She is too late to warn them as the Chitauri activate a series of nuclear explosives that apparently kills the team. Janet is taken captive and meets the alien leader Herr Kleiser. Kleiser explains that the Chitauri are all controlled by a single eusocial mind that spans across the entire universe and that the event taking place on Earth is one of many other invasions happening across millions of different planets. Kleiser also says that the Chitauri can take the form of whatever organism they consume, and he himself plans on devouring Janet so that he may experiment with the human female form.

The Chitauri are forced to make a change of plans when their armada descends upon the Earth, revealing their existence to the entire world. The admiral claims that the other worlds are fighting back and have forced them into the Earth's solar system, and that they will have to abandon their attempts at colonizing the Earth and instead completely destroy it. Suddenly, a freak lightning storm called up by Thor hits the Triskelion, destroying all Chitauri land forces. The Ultimates appear, revealed to have survived the explosion in Micronesia thanks to a force field deployed through Iron Man's armor. Janet is freed and a final battle ensues.

Captain America and Fury lead several S.H.I.E.L.D. soldiers in a ground assault while Iron Man and Thor assist the aerial assault against the Chitauri ships. Janet, Black Widow, and Hawkeye infiltrate the Triskelion and locate the bomb, but are unable to defuse it because it is written in an alien language. Captain America brawls with Kleiser, and is easily overpowered because of Kleiser's rapid healing factor. On Captain America's command, Bruce Banner is released from isolation and is beaten by several S.H.I.E.L.D. soldiers to make him turn into the Hulk once again. When this fails due to Banner being heavily medicated, he is thrown off a helicopter which has the intended result. Hulk takes down Chitauri ships, then proceeds to brutally beat Kleiser before ripping him apart and eating his remains. Thor is able to dispose of the bomb by sending it through a portal to another dimension. Hawkeye fires an adamantium arrow at the Hulk, injecting him with an antidote that causes him to revert to his human form. The remaining Chitauri are soon killed and the Earth is saved.

In the aftermath of the conflict, the Ultimates are invited to a celebration being held at the White House for their part in saving the Earth from the Chitauri. Hank calls Janet hoping to apologize for abusing her, but Janet hangs up on him before he has a chance. Banner willingly returns to isolation, horrified and disturbed that he had eaten Kleiser and his excretions are collected by S.H.I.E.L.D. to be analyzed and destroyed so that Kleiser will not reform. During the celebration, Captain America and Janet share a dance and a kiss.

== Awards and nominations ==
Mark Millar was nominated for the 2002 and 2004 Wizard Fan Award for "Favorite Writer" for his work on The Ultimates.

Bryan Hitch was nominated for the 2003 Harvey Award for "Best Artist" and 2002 and 2003 Wizard Fan Award for "Favorite Artist." Bryan Hitch and Andrew Currie were nominated for the 2003 Eisner Award for "Best Penciller/Inker or Penciller/Inker Team."

Letterer Chris Eliopoulos won the 2002 and 2003 Wizard Fan Award for "Favorite Letterer."

== Collected editions ==
| The Ultimates Vol. 1: Super-Human | (ISBN 0-7851-0960-9) | collects Ultimates #1–6 |
| The Ultimates Vol. 2: Homeland Security | (ISBN 0-7851-1078-X) | collects Ultimates #7–13 |
| The Ultimates (Hardcover) | (ISBN 0-7851-1082-8) | collects Ultimates #1–13 |
| The Ultimates: Ultimate Collection (Paperback) | (ISBN 0-7851-4387-4) | collects Ultimates #1–13 |

== Sequels ==
The series was followed by two sequels The Ultimates 2 and The Ultimates 3. These were followed by Ultimate Comics: Avengers, Ultimate Comics: New Ultimates, and Ultimate Comics: The Ultimates.

== 2024 relaunch ==
In February 2024, it was announced that Deniz Camp and Juan Frigeri would write and illustrate The Ultimates. The series is set in the Ultimate Universe, which is not connected to the original Ultimate Marvel universe.

== Adaptations ==
=== Animation ===
- The Ultimates was loosely adapted into two animated films, Ultimate Avengers and Ultimate Avengers 2.

=== Live-action ===
- In The Incredible Hulk, Bruce Banner's transformation is caused by falling out of a helicopter similar to a scene in the comic.
- The Ultimates served as an inspiration for the 2012 live-action crossover film The Avengers.
- The Triskelion appears in Captain America: The Winter Soldier as the Headquarters for S.H.I.E.L.D. in Washington, D.C., and use the storyline that S.H.I.E.L.D. is being taken over by Hydra. Also, Captain America jumping out of a Quinjet without a parachute is a homage to the first issue of The Ultimates.
- According to actor Aaron Taylor-Johnson, Avengers: Age of Ultron drew inspiration from the Ultimate comics.

== Reception ==
Keith Dallas from comicsbulletin.com in the review of the "Homeland Security" story arc states the artwork is "visual magnificence" however is concerned about the dark writing of the characters stripped of their "super-heroic nobility" and was "disheartened by the book’s tone and cynicism". Kevin Forest Moreau gave this story arc 4.2 out of 5.0 stating it is an "engaging read, filled with intriguing and amusing modern takes on classic Marvel characters" whilst praising Bryan Hitch's artwork by saying it is "amazing, gorgeous artwork, which continues to set the standard for cinematic photo-realism."

== See also ==
- Ultimates
- The Ultimates 2
- Tomorrow Men
