= The Ultimates 3: Who Killed the Scarlet Witch? =

2008 Marvel Comics miniseries

- The Ultimates 3 Issue 1 cover

Publication information
- Publisher: Marvel Comics
- Schedule: Monthly
- Format: Mini-series
- Publication date: December 5, 2007 – September 24, 2008
- No. of issues: 5
- Main character: The Ultimates

Creative team
- Written by: Jeph Loeb
- Artist: Joe Madureira

The Ultimates 3: Who Killed the Scarlet Witch?, initially published simply as The Ultimates 3 or Ultimates 3, was a five-issue monthly American comic book miniseries published in 2008 by Marvel Comics in the Ultimate Marvel imprint. Written by Jeph Loeb, and illustrated by Joe Madureira, it is a sequel to The Ultimates and The Ultimates 2, as well as a prelude to Ultimatum. A sequel entitled Ultimate Comics: New Ultimates, also written by Loeb, was released in 2010. The series continues the stories of the Ultimates.

== Plot ==
Hank Pym is under house arrest at Ultimates Mansion. One of Pym's Ultron robots drugs him and leaks a sex tape of Tony Stark and Black Widow to distract from the subsequent murder of Scarlet Witch. Magneto abducts Scarlet Witch's corpse and retreats to the Savage Land, where he is confronted by the Ultimates. Pym and Wasp discover the truth about the Ultron robot, which has adopted the identity of Yellowjacket and used the Ultimates' DNA to create android duplicates. Although the true Ultimates destroy their android counterparts and Yellowjacket, Quicksilver is apparently killed by Hawkeye. The Wasp then invites Pym to return to the Ultimates, and he accepts. The mastermind behind the robot's plot is revealed to be Doctor Doom.

== Reception ==
Ultimates 3 #1 ranked first in December 2007's Top 300 comics with preorder sales of 131,401, Issue #2 ranked number seven with 105,070 preorders. Issue three ranked better than its predecessor, falling at number five, but had a smaller number of preorders, totaling at 97,210.

Reviewing Ultimates 3, IGN called the book a "reasonably decent experience" although the issue "falters on its own merits", only to later state while reviewing the third issue that "Behind the theatrics and swagger, there's just nothing there to draw me in. These are the characters that I used to enjoy in name only, hollow shells of what they used to be." Comicboards' review was even harsher, remarking that Ultimates 3 "has somehow managed to entirely miss what made the Ultimates something other than alternate universe Avengers" and adding "this was the worst comic I've read all year". The series was panned for its characterization.

== Collected edition ==
| Title | Material collected | Published date | ISBN |
|---|---|---|---|
| The Ultimates 3: Who Killed the Scarlet Witch? | Issues #1–5 | May 2009 | 978-0785122692 |
