= The Ultimates 2 =

Comic book limited series

- Cover art to The Ultimates 2 #1. Art by Bryan Hitch and Paul Neary.

Publication information
- Publisher: Marvel Comics
- Schedule: Monthly
- Format: Limited series
- Genre: Superhero
- Publication date: February 2005 – February 2007
- No. of issues: 15 (including 2 annuals)
- Main character(s): Ultimates; Ultimate Nick Fury; Liberators

Creative team
- Written by: Mark Millar
- Artist: Bryan Hitch
- Inker: Paul Neary
- Letterer: Chris Eliopoulos
- Colorist: Laura Martin

Collected editions
- The Ultimates 2 Vol. 1: Gods And Monsters: ISBN 0-7851-1093-3
- The Ultimates 2 Vol. 2: Grand Theft America: ISBN 0-7851-1790-3
- The Ultimates 2: ISBN 9780785121381

The Ultimates 2 is a 2005–2007 thirteen-issue comic book limited series written by Mark Millar with art by Bryan Hitch, the sequel to The Ultimates. The series features the superhero team the Ultimates and was published by the Ultimate Marvel imprint of Marvel Comics, and was followed by The Ultimates 3: Who Killed the Scarlet Witch?.

== Publication history ==
The series debuted in December 2004 and was completed in May 2007.

Millar stated in Pop Culture Shock that this arc reflected contemporary issues, ranging from hyper-powered countries like the US, preemptive strikes, the rising world-wide anti-American sentiment in the wake of the Neo-Conservative Bush Doctrine, and the "rogue nation" classification and the fear of backlash in form of nuclear Armageddon. Millar said: "In the name of oil, this administration is stirring up a hornet's nest . . . . My own belief is that there'll be a couple of nuclear attacks in the States, the multinationals will move elsewhere, the American economy will completely collapse and make the 30s look like the 80s and the Middle East will be occupied by drafted teenagers from your home town. . . . I hope I'm completely and utterly wrong."

Bryan Hitch described completing the final issue of Ultimates 2 by saying, "The bane of my life for the last five years is gone from my day to day routine." He describes the job as difficult, but stated that no prior job in his then-twenty years in the business was "so creatively rewarding, so time-consuming and so fulfilling".

== Plot synopsis ==
One year after the end of The Ultimates, public opinion has turned sharply against the team following their deployment to the Middle Eastern nation of Iraq. They are increasingly viewed by the public as a government strike force created to silence international dissent. Their reputation deteriorates even further when a mole within the team leaks that Bruce Banner is the Hulk, that he is responsible for hundreds of deaths, and that S.H.I.E.L.D. attempted to cover up his involvement. Betty Ross, the Ultimates' PR specialist and Banner's girlfriend, reluctantly chooses her position—and the team—over him, ultimately allowing Banner to die. Banner receives the death penalty and is seemingly executed. Meanwhile, Janet Pym and Steve Rogers have begun dating after the events of the previous book. Janet quickly grows tired of Steve and his habit of only visiting elderly acquaintances, and she begins secretly seeing her ex-husband, Hank Pym, again. Tony Stark, Iron Man, is dating Natasha Romanov, the Black Widow. He builds her an Iron Man-style suit and later proposes to her.

During a meeting with European heroes, the Ultimates learn from Norwegian scientist Gunnar Golmen that Thor is actually his brother Thorlief, a former mental patient who escaped and stole advanced technology from the Norwegian government. The revelation further damages the team's credibility. Thor confides in his friend Volstagg—who is not actually present—making him appear delusional and lending weight to Golmen's claims. After an incident in Italy, the Ultimates attempt to take Thor into custody, narrowly defeating him by removing his belt. He is then confined to a psychiatric hospital, where he insists that Golmen is actually his brother Loki in disguise, but no one believes him.

Hank Pym, estranged from the team, tries to convince S.H.I.E.L.D. Director General Nick Fury to let him rejoin under the alias Ant-Man, but Fury refuses. Pym then attempts to pitch his Ultron project, only to be shut down again. Frustrated, Pym—now operating as Ant-Man—joins a street-level superhero team known as the Defenders, a group composed mostly of miserable jokes who lie about knowing Doctor Strange. They are led by Valkyrie, a blonde girl who likes Thor, snores loudly, and falsely claims to be a kung-fu expert despite only holding an orange belt. The other members—Nighthawk, Son of Satan, Black Knight, Hellcat, Power Man, and Whiz Kid—are similarly inept and unsuccessful. Pym quickly grows upset with himself for sinking to this level. When the Defenders attempt to stop a group of teenagers from stealing cigarettes, they end up humiliating themselves, failing miserably and nearly resulting in Nighthawk's death. Just as Hank hits his low point, he receives a promising call from an unknown group and immediately gets to work.

The group is revealed to be a coalition of anti-American multinational forces dubbed the Liberators, led by Colonel Abdul al-Rahman, an Iraqi super-soldier wielding a lightsaber-like weapon and enraged by the Ultimates' mission in Iraq. The remaining Liberators include the Abomination, a Hulk-like creature; the Crimson Dynamo, a Chinese Iron Man equipped with a legion of robots; Schizoid Man, possessing duplication abilities taken from Multiple Man; Perun, a Russian equivalent of Thor; Swarm, who controls insects; and Hurricane, a North Korean speedster—all supported by a massive army of foot soldiers. Hawkeye's family is murdered during a home invasion, after which Hawkeye himself is taken captive. Security footage appears to show Captain America as the culprit, and he is thus apprehended by S.H.I.E.L.D. The Liberators then launch a coordinated assault on the United States and successfully seize control, capturing Spider-Man, the X-Men, and the Fantastic Four in the process.

Natasha is revealed to be the mole, having secretly aided the Liberators as retribution for the United States' role in the fall of the Soviet Union. After murdering Tony's butler, Jarvis, she attempts to kill Tony as well, but his nanites incapacitate her before she can finish the job. Hank Pym, now a member of the Liberators, uses his Ultron robots for crowd control. Captain America is freed by the Wasp and defeats Schizoid Man, but is confronted by the Colonel. Banner is also revealed to be alive and returns as the Hulk, quickly killing the Abomination. Swarm is incapacitated by the Wasp, Crimson Dynamo is vaporized by Stark, and Hurricane is disintegrated by Quicksilver. Captain America and al-Rahman engage in an intense battle, with Captain America ultimately killing the Colonel. The Ultron robots suggest to Pym that they might still be able to turn the tide of the battle. Pym, panicking, refuses and instead changes his story, claiming he had secretly been infiltrating the Liberators from the beginning, and commands his Ultron robots to aid the Ultimates.

Just as everything settles down, Gunnar Golmen steps in and reveals himself to be Loki, having lied about everything. He then summons an army of monsters to attack, but Thor, revealed to truly be a god, calls forth an Asgardian army of his own and defeats him. Perun, the last surviving Liberator, surrenders. Hank is placed on probation for his role in aiding the Liberators, and Hawkeye tracks down Natasha in a hospital, killing her in revenge for his family's murder. Stark, dejected after Natasha is outed as a spy, nearly falls into depression until he immediately becomes infatuated with a random woman, snapping out of it just as quickly. Realizing that the United States policing the world through the Ultimates would likely lead to outcomes similar to the catastrophe with the Liberators, Captain America tells Fury that the team will separate themselves from S.H.I.E.L.D. and continue to operate as an independent team, free from government control and working outside the law.

== Reception ==
Lance Eaton from curledup.com reviewed the first story arc Gods and Monsters. He praises Millar's writing of the classic heroes and states that the "inclusion of current-day politics" improves the storyline.

Kevin Powers from comicsbulletin.com reviewed the final issue #13 but found it anticlimactic with the issue degenerating to a "slug fest". Powers praised with art, however, stating that Bryan Hitch's "artwork has definitely been one of the main elements that will make this series memorable." Similarly Robert Mclaughlin from denofgeek.com praised the artwork, with "Bryan Hitch doing some of the best work of his career". He was critical of the Millar's writing stating it had "no substance".

== Collected editions ==
| The Ultimates 2 (hardcover) | (ISBN 9780785121381) | Collects Ultimates 2 #1-13, and Ultimates 2 #1 Variant Sketch Edition |
| The Ultimates 2 Ultimate Collection | (ISBN 978-0-7851-4916-3) | Collects Ultimates 2 #1-13, and Ultimates 2 #1 Variant Sketch Edition |
| The Ultimates 2 Vol. 1: Gods And Monsters | (ISBN 0-7851-1093-3) | Collects Ultimates 2 #1-6 |
| The Ultimates 2 Vol. 2: Grand Theft America | (ISBN 0-7851-1790-3) | Collects Ultimates 2 #7-13 |
| The Ultimate Annuals Vol. 1 | (ISBN 0-7851-2035-1) | Includes Ultimates 2 Annual #1 |
| The Ultimate Annuals Vol. 2 | (ISBN 0-7851-2371-7) | Includes Ultimates 2 Annual #2 |
| The Ultimates Omnibus | (ISBN 0-7851-3780-7) | Collects Ultimates #1-13, Ultimates 2 #1-13, Ultimates Annual #1, and Ultimates 2 #1 Variant Sketch Edition |

== Sequels ==
The series was followed by The Ultimates 3: Who Killed the Scarlet Witch?.

== See also ==
- Ultimates
- The Ultimates (comic book)
- Tomorrow Men
