= Thor (Ultimate Marvel) =

- Art by Carlos Pacheco

Publication information
- Publisher: Marvel Comics Ultimate Marvel
- First appearance: Ultimates #4 (June 2002)
- Created by: Mark Millar; Bryan Hitch; Based on the Marvel Universe Thor, adapted by Stan Lee and Jack Kirby

In-story information
- Alter ego: Thor Odinson
- Place of origin: Ultimate Marvel (Earth-1610)
- Team affiliations: Asgardians; Thor Corps; Ultimate Avengers; Ultimates; S.H.I.E.L.D.
- Notable aliases: Thorlief Golmen
- Abilities: Superhuman strength, speed, stamina and durability; Skilled hand to hand combatant; Abilities via Axe hammer: Flight; Teleportation; Large scale weather manipulation; Electrokinesis

In the Ultimate Marvel universe, Thorlief "Thor" Golmen is a superhero based on the Marvel Universe version of Thor, who is the Asgardian God of Thunder and a founding member of the Ultimates. Also known as "Ultimate Thor", Golmen is an anarchist who discovers he is the reincarnation of the Norse warrior god Thor. The "Ultimate" redesign of the character reduces the number of Thor's powers, and reduces the character's reliance upon his hammer. Thor's long-established personality is drastically altered, changing him from an eager and willing divine combatant into an ecocentric, arguably unstable, and reluctant warrior.

Adapted from Stan Lee and Jack Kirby's comic book version of Thor by Mark Millar and Bryan Hitch, in-turn based on the deity of the same name of Norse mythology, first appearing in The Ultimates.

== Fictional character biography ==
=== Principle and ratio ===
Ultimate Thor was once a psychiatric nurse called Thorlief Golmen until suffering a nervous breakdown before his 30th birthday. During the 18 months he spent institutionalized, he claims to have realized who he is and why he has been sent to Earth. He claimed to be Thor, Norse god of thunder, on a mission to save the planet and to stop the "war to end all wars." Thor himself claims to have known who he was since he was twelve years old, and that his nervous breakdown only brought him further clarity. His political and social activism, as well as his own self-help books, attracted rebellious hippies and conspiracy theorists. He spoke against America's military aggression towards other world powers and the military-industrial complex.

His background is made less clear due to his brother Loki's reality manipulations, and later stories try to reconcile this history with the existence of Asgard.

=== The Ultimates ===
In The Ultimates, when General Nick Fury contacted Thor about joining the Ultimates, Thor refused to work for the military-industrial complex that he detests. When the Hulk appeared in Manhattan, Thor refused to assist unless the President doubled the foreign aid budget. Not long after the Ultimates confronted the Hulk, the President relented and Thor appeared in time to save Captain America from Hulk. Following the battle, Thor became good friends with Tony Stark and Steve Rogers, pledging his support whenever lives are in danger. Over dinner, he explained his origins to Stark and Rogers and insisted that he is the real Thor. Soon thereafter, Thor was briefed on the Chitauri and sent to investigate a suspected Chitauri base in Micronesia. They were saved by Iron Man's force field after they discovered the base abandoned and ready to explode. Once a Chitauri fleet appeared in Arizona, Thor brought the survivors there. He and Iron Man then provided air support against the Chitauri spacecraft until the Air Force arrived. After Iron Man asked Thor to help him dispose of the Chitauri bomb that would obliterate the entire solar system, Thor teleported it to the wastes of Náströnd, a deserted world in the Asgardian cosmos where its detonation caused only a small ripple in our space-time.

=== Ultimate War ===
In Ultimate War, Thor appears as a member of the Ultimates, retrieving the dead with Iron Man after the attack in issue one. When Magneto attacks the Ultimates, he says he is surprised to see Thor with the Ultimates, and asks him if he thinks he can change them. Thor throws Mjolnir at the Master of Magnetism, but Magneto manages to stop it an inch from his helmet and throws it back at Thor, sending him through a wall. Thor joins the Ultimates in attacking the X-Men later on; he fights Storm but is defeated by Colossus.

=== Ultimates Six ===
In Ultimate Six, Thor appears with the Ultimates while bringing in Kraven the Hunter, although he refuses Captain America's requests to catch Kraven or bring him back when they arrive to bring him in for illegally tampering with his DNA. He is seen aiding in reconstruction efforts in Bosnia when summoned following the Six's breakout. Thor defeats Electro and Kraven the Hunter during the climactic battle at the White House.

=== Ultimate Secret ===
In Ultimate Secret, Thor and Iron Man escort the Fantastic Four to Nevada. When the Kree attack the base, Thor, Black Widow, Johnny Storm, and Thing fight off the aliens. As he is idolized by Johnny Storm and Ben Grimm, he fraternizes with them and orders Carol Danvers to prepare a keg of beer for after the battle.

=== Ultimate Fantastic Four ===
Thor has appeared or been mentioned in several storylines of the Ultimate Fantastic Four. Reed Richards at one point created infant hard light versions of the Ultimates and thought Thor to be the most powerful superhuman on the planet. This was proved wrong when Namor appeared to be physically stronger. In another storyline, an interdimensional parasite that sought out the most powerful being on the planet bypassed a present Thor and possessed Doctor Doom. This is attributed to a combination of Doom's physical states and knowledge of Atlantean magic.

Thor appeared as a minor character in an alternate timeline as the President of the United States due to time travel involving Skrull invaders. In it his powers were described as "natural." This alternate version was killed during the Skrull invasion and ceased to exist when the timeline was erased.

Thor appeared in a later storyline involving Thanos. He stated he had fought Thanos in the past and tried to fight him again along with the rest of the Ultimates. He was quickly defeated due to Thanos possessing the Cosmic Cube and turned into a tree. This was undone when Thanos was defeated by the Fantastic Four.

=== The Ultimates 2 ===
In The Ultimates 2, Thor has resigned from the Ultimates due to his belief that the team has become a tool for American foreign policy. In a restaurant, he meets fellow Asgardian Volstagg, also reincarnated as a human, who warns him his half-brother Gunnar Golmen/Loki has escaped and is shifting reality on Earth to strike at Thor. Volstagg is then erased from reality making it look like Thor is delusional. After Bruce Banner's identity of the Hulk is leaked to the public, Captain America accuses Thor of the leak, but Thor denies the charge. He tries to warn Captain America of Loki's influence, but his warnings are rejected as are his claims to be Thor. An anti-super-soldier demonstration in Italy turns violent due to Loki's interference. When Thor intervenes on behalf of the protesters, the incident is used as an excuse for the Ultimates to team with the European Defence Initiative's super-soldiers to arrest him. The EDI's head scientist Gunnar Golmen reveals that Thor's powers are technological in nature, coming from his belt and hammer. Gunnar explains that Thor is really his own mentally-troubled brother who stole the equipment and has been being acting as Thor ever since. Gunnar claims the equipment gives Thor physical strength and powers beyond anyone else on the planet, and that he is too dangerous to take on alone. Thor is tracked to Norway. After he fails to convince the Ultimates that Gunnar is really a masquerading Loki manipulating reality, a battle ensues. Despite initially holding his own, Thor is eventually overwhelmed and has to call upon a storm. At the last moment, Quicksilver is able to remove his belt stripping Thor of his powers and his ability to use Mjolnir. Thor is then locked up in the Triskelion all the time being mocked by Loki, who is invisible to all but him and attempts to convince him that he is insane. Thor is imprisoned in the Triskelion until the last issue of the series, where his attempts to warn the Ultimates about the coming dangers are ignored. Following the Liberators' conquest of America, Thor is freed by Odin (helped by Scarlet Witch using her mutant hex power to effect the probability of Thor regaining his power) and restored to full power in time to battle a revealed Loki. At first Loki has the upper hand by using his powers over reality to become immune to Thor's hammer and overpowering the thunder god while summoning an army of Asgardian monsters to kill the Ultimates. After an army of Asgardian warriors arrive to fight the monsters, Loki's powers stop working for unknown reasons. During the battle, Loki reveals he is responsible for creating the idea of a Norwegian super-soldier program and framing Captain America. Thor is able to destroy Loki's mortal form and send his spirit back to Odin for punishment. Now vindicated in his claims of godhood, Thor learns that the Ultimates will no longer be working for the government and rejoins the team.

=== Ultimate Power ===
In Ultimate Power, Thor appears alongside the rest of the new Ultimates alongside Nick Fury arriving to battle the Squadron Supreme when they destroy the roof of the Baxter Building. After the battle Thor used his hammer to teleport the Helicarrier with the team to the Supremeverse. There he engages Hyperion in combat, but it remains inconclusive.

In Ultimate Power #7, Thor beats Hyperion by felling him with a huge bolt of lightning then severely beating him with Mjolnir. He also knocks back Zarda as she attempts to stop him from beating Hyperion.

=== The Ultimates 3 ===
In The Ultimates 3, Thor undergoes many changes making him closer to his mainstream counterpart. He is redesigned with a beard and a bulkier build. He becomes much more eager for battle and more vengeful. His ax/hammer is replaced with one closer to the mainstream version of Mjolnir in look.

He has formed a romantic relationship with Valkyrie, who has mysteriously gained superhuman powers. He starts speaking in a Shakespearean pattern, claiming it is the way he truly speaks and with his godhood no longer in doubt feels he no longer has to hide it.

During the course of the story he reveals he has a collection of weapons which were a gift from Odin forged by Ulik. The ax/hammer weapon is among them. During the course of the story Thor aids the team when the Brotherhood of Mutants attacks their mansion. He later travels to the Savage Land with the Ultimates to confront Magneto. He once again battles Magneto, but is defeated and buried near the center of the Earth.

After the true mastermind behind the events is revealed, Thor attempts to confront Magneto again, but Magneto uses his powers to take Thor's hammer from him and then flees. Following this, Thor begins using a sword. Donald Blake also appeared in the first issue of the series as the doctor who attempted to revive the Scarlet Witch after she was shot.

Blake was never seen again in the series. However he later would appear in Ultimate Thor where he is revealed to be Balder, Thor and Loki's brother and Odin's eyes and ears, revived in human form after being murdered by Loki.

=== Ultimatum ===
As mentioned, Magneto uses Thor's hammer to create worldwide destruction after what happened to Scarlet Witch and Quicksilver. During these events, upon finding Valkyrie's lifeless body following a tidal wave, Thor enters Valhalla to reclaim her soul. He is then confronted by Hela, who forces Thor to battle her army of fallen warriors to reach Valkyrie. Captain America suddenly appears in Valhalla, implying that he has died. In Valhalla, Thor sacrifices himself to save Valkyrie and Captain America from Hela, and this allows them to go back to life.

=== New Ultimates ===
In New Ultimates #1, Thor is shown still imprisoned, demanding Hela returns him to Earth and to Valkyrie. She tells him she will give him whatever his heart desires in exchange for a son. The next issue has a vision shown to Valkyrie by Amora where Thor is having sex with Hela, to give her a son. Later, Hela tells him that another soul is still needed for him to leave, Thor says it will be hers but finds himself unable to kill her because she is already pregnant. At the end of the issue, he is resurrected at the price of the death of Valkyrie. Thor then goes into a rage searching for his brother and attacking the Ultimates in the process until he finally finds him and gets his hammer back with the Ultimates watching as he is still extremely angry.

Thor remains in the Ultimates when they were employed by Carol Danvers and battles Nick Fury's black-ops team codenamed the Avengers. At this point, Thor is back in a relationship with Jane Foster and shared an apartment with her and began to talk like a "normal person" again when Tony Stark promised to donate money to charity if Thor gave up his Asgardian "faux-Shakespearean" speech-pattern. In the final battle during the revolution in North Korea organised by Gregory Stark, Thor and the Ultimates battle Gregory, whose superpowered suit made him too powerful to defeat until Iron Man disabled it with an electromagnetic pulse, giving Thor the opportunity to kill Gregory on the spot with a lightning bolt.

Thor's return and rejoining into the Ultimates was confirmed in Ultimate Comics: Spider-Man, where he is seen as one of the Ultimates. Director Danvers asks his advice, and one of the Ultimates who will teach Spider-Man to be a hero.

=== Ultimate Fallout ===
During the "Ultimate Fallout" storyline, Thor attends Peter Parker's funeral, where he reflects that he has seen Peter in Valhalla with the deceased X-Men and Ultimates members.

=== Ultimate Comics: Thor ===
Ultimate Comics: Thor reveals Thor's personal history from Asgard and prior to the events of The Ultimates. Eons ago, Thor resided in Asgard along with his brothers Balder and Loki, and under the rule of King Odin. Odin foresees that Asgard will soon fall and chooses Thor to champion the ways of Asgard after that event.

The hammer Mjolnir is crafted to contain the power of Asgard, and Thor is the only one who is able to wield the weapon. After murdering Balder and stealing the Norn Stones, Loki relocates to Earth. There, he aligns himself with the Nazis in World War II in the guise of Baron Zemo. Loki uses the stones to return to Asgard, armed with an army of Frost Giants and Nazi soldiers.

In the ensuing battle, Odin transports Loki to the Room with No Doors, but is subsequently killed by a Frost Giant named Mammoth. While Asgard de-materializes, Thor delivers one last powerful blow against the invaders.

In modern-day Earth, Thor is shown to be the subject of the European Super Soldier program. His powers are shown to be a function of the program, designed by the E.S.S. to imitate Norse iconography with Thor as the super-soldier symbol of Norway, but the project meets an unexpected stumbling block when Thor's claims of being the human incarnation of a Norse God leads the scientists in charge of the program to believe that he is insane.

Psychiatrist Donald Blake is revealed to be the reborn Balder and tells the scientists that his examination suggests that Thor is who he says he is. Balder tells Thor that, despite Ragnarok destroying Asgard, the Gods live on in the hearts of mortals and are yet to be reawakened.

This, in addition to the financial costs that went into the super soldier program, convinces the scientists to complete the work that turns Thor into a super soldier.

He is given a suit designed to heighten his strength significantly, leaving him practically unbeatable, along with being equipped with a weather-manipulation device which allows him to control weather and teleport across space. When the scientist face difficulty in handling the size of the machine, Thor tells them to make it the head of his new ax-hammer.

Once allowed into the open, Thor works on a number of humanitarian projects, and rejects offers from General Nick Fury to join the Ultimates.

Meanwhile, Loki escapes from the Room with No Doors and returns to Earth. Balder convinces Thor to take up his responsibility as a hero as Thor joins the Ultimates in subduing the Hulk. Despite his pacifist ideals, Thor promises to "bring the Thunder" against "men who make war."

Reed Richards returned to Earth and founded an organization called Children of Tomorrow, a group of evolved humans with the aim of dominating the world, building their base called the Dome. The Dome's interior ages at an accelerated rate compared to the outside world.

Over 900 years have passed inside the Dome, so their inhabitants evolved themselves to perfect super-humans.

The EUSS attacked the Dome with Captain Britain, Captain Spain, and Captain France along with Thor. The heroes were subdued by the enemies and some of them were killed, draining their powers.

After examining Thor, Richards, now called the Maker, sent the Children for the source of power of Thor, leading them to Asgard. After killing every Asgardian God, the Children drained the power of Yggdrasil, leaving Thor powerless. After Iron Man rescued Thor, he provided Odinson with an upgraded version of his Super-Soldier armor, with which Thor teleported to the Dome in search of vengeance.

There, he rescued Captain Britain, but was defeated by the Children, and the Maker showed himself as Reed Richards, with the condition of deliver that message. Also, a new ability emerged to Thor, being the last Asgardian alive, he apparently "became" Valhalla, being able to see the ghost of the dead Asgardians, such as Odin, Loki, and others, who apparently also acts as his awareness, helping him. Following these events, Thor moved into Stark Tower with Jane Foster.

Thor was present with Stark when the Ultimates were labelled as outlaws accompanied him when Stark detailed his plans of how to defeat Reed Richards to the new President of the United States. He easily defeated the Hulk, who was brainwashed by the Maker and injected with a Giant-Man serum.

Thor later battles his son, Modi, who has tried to conquer the United States with the help of Hydra. Thor is forced to kill Modi, and is left to mourn his son, as well as rue his own failures as a father.

When Reed Richards and his Dark Ultimates destroy the Trisection, Thor leaves to drown his sorrows at a small bar in Arizona.

Bruce Banner tracks Thor down and transforms into the Hulk, leading to a rematch between the two. Thor is defeated and imprisoned, but is later freed alongside the rest of his teammates. Iron Man also creates a new hammer and suit of armor for Thor by using Reed's future technology.

When the Earth-616 version of Galactus attacks the Ultimate Earth, Thor is among those to challenge the entity. During the final battle, Thor sacrifices himself in order to drive Galactus into the Negative Zone, trapping them both.

=== Secret Wars ===
After the destruction of both the Earth-616 and Ultimate universes as seen during the "Secret Wars" storyline, Thor is among those rescued by God Emperor Doom and transported to Battleworld. Now known as Thunderer Thorlief (nicknamed "Ultimate Thor") of the Thor Corps, he became a top member of the Thor Corps working under Lawspeaker Thor. Thorlief begins investigating the murderers of various men and women who all turn out to be alternate universe versions of Donald Blake and Jane Foster. Thorlief discovers that the murders were committed by Rune Thor, who had been tasked by God Emperor Doom with eliminating the various versions of Donald and Jane in order to keep the Thor Corps from remembering that the Multiverse once existed before Battleworld. Thorlief and the other members of the Thor Corps storm Doom's castle where they are all killed. Thorlief is resurrected when Earth-1610 is restored.

== Powers and abilities ==
Thor possesses immense superhuman strength, stamina, and durability. At the beginning of the series, his physical powers were entirely dependent on his belt because he had no access to his divine powers. After being restored by Odin, however, it is unclear if the belt boosts his powers or, in fact, serves any purpose at all.

Thor possesses the ability to control the weather on a large scale. He is capable of summoning thunderstorms and controlling massive amounts of lightning. He can teleport across space and between dimensions. It is unknown to what extent he relies on his weapons for these abilities. It is also unknown if Thor can control other types of weather. Both variations of his hammer are capable of these powers.

Thor possesses some skill at combat. He is depicted with an armory of weapons ranging from different types of hammers to swords and daggers. However, the ax/hammer hybrid primarily wielded by the character is considered to be the "Ultimate" version of Mjolnir, as revealed in Ultimate Power #9. But, in the Ultimate Thor miniseries it is revealed that the hammer resembling the Earth-616 version was his weapon when he was a god, and was lost during Ragnarok. When he is reincarnated as Thorlief Golmen, he is given tech-based armour and a portable power supply that gives him his superhuman powers, which is turned into the recognisable axe-hammer from The Ultimates.

In The Ultimates 3, Thor no longer wears the belt or uses the axe-hammer, and instead uses the "true" Mjolnir. When the Children of Tomorrow drain the Odinforce and exterminate the Asgardian race, Thor is stripped of his godly powers and gives his square hammer to his son Modi before pushing him into the World Tree. From then, he uses the belt and axe-hammer he wielded before, now more powerful due to advancements made by Tony Stark.

== In other media ==
- Ultimate Thor appears in the two animated films Ultimate Avengers: The Movie and Ultimate Avengers 2, voiced by Dave Boat. Thor undergoes some differences to make him resemble the original Thor created by Stan Lee. His costume and hammer remain unchanged from The Ultimates, though he is clean-shaven and has on-screen conferences with Odin. His speech is formal and stilted. In Ultimate Avengers, Thor's onscreen time is considerably smaller than the appearances of the other heroes. He first appears with a group of environmental protesters when Nick Fury and Captain America approach him to join the Avengers. He appears in the climax of the film in time to help defeat the Chitauri fleet and stop the invasion. In Ultimate Avengers 2, he overcomes a predicament (which he foresees in a vision) involving the deaths of the Avengers at the hands of the Chitauri invasion force.
- The Ultimate costume is the default skin for Thor in the video game Marvel: Ultimate Alliance, as well as being worn in the cutscenes.
- Ultimate Thor appears with the Ultimates after Spider-Man's battle with Green Goblin in Spider-Man: Battle for New York.
- The Marvel Cinematic Universe version of Thor borrows certain elements of costume and personality from the Ultimate version.
