= Ultimates =

Marvel Comics series

The Ultimates
- Promotional art for The Ultimates 2 #1 (February 2005). Art by Bryan Hitch & Paul Neary.

Publication information
- Publisher: Marvel Comics (Ultimate Marvel)
- First appearance: The Ultimates #1 (March 2002)
- Created by: Mark Millar; Bryan Hitch (based upon The Avengers by Stan Lee and Jack Kirby)

In-story information
- Base(s): Triskelion; Ultimates Mansion
- Leader(s): Captain America
- Member(s): Nick Fury (founder); Captain America; Iron Man; Thor; Wasp; Giant-Man

Roster

The Ultimates is a superhero team appearing in American comic books published by Marvel Comics and created by writer Mark Millar and artist Bryan Hitch, which first started publication from The Ultimates #1 (cover date March 2002), as part of the company's Ultimate Marvel imprint. The series is a modernized re-imagining of Marvel's long-running Avengers comic-book franchise, centering around a task-force of super-humans and special agents organized by the U.S. government to combat growing threats to the world. The tale chronicles their progress as they bond and slowly learn to work together, despite their differing natures and personalities.

== Publication history ==
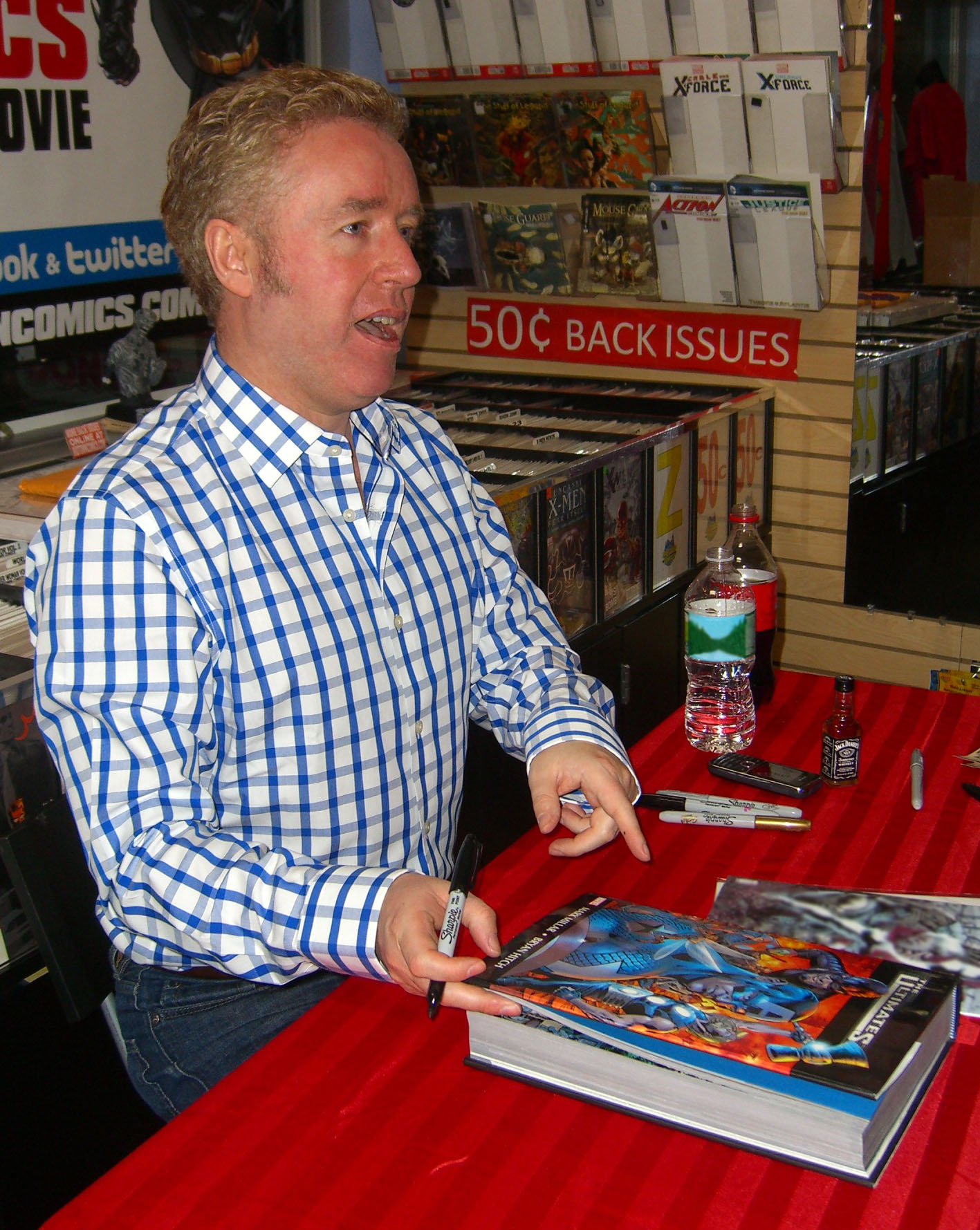
Writer Mark Millar signing a copy of the collected edition of the first miniseries during an appearance at Midtown Comics in Manhattan.

The first volume of the Ultimates, written by Millar and illustrated by Hitch, was published in limited series format and ran for thirteen issues with production delays from January 30, 2002 until March 31, 2004. Hitch described the alternative-reality reimagining as one where, "You have to approach it as though nothing has happened before and tell the story fresh from the start.... We had to get to the core of who these people were and build outwards, so Cap [Captain America] was a soldier, Thor is either a nut case or a messiah ... Banner [the Hulk] an insecure genius, and [superspy Nick] Fury the king of cool".

A second series, also by Millar and Hitch, was released as Ultimates 2 and ran 13 issues from Dec. 2004 to May 2007. The series had originally been slated for April 2004, but was resolicited to stockpile enough issues for a monthly release. It ran into similar production delays, however, due to Millar's struggles with Crohn's Disease and involvement writing Civil War, as well as the artists' need to keep busy with other work in the meantime.

In a 2004 interview, Millar outlined the difference between the Ultimates and the Avengers: "The idea behind The Avengers is that the Marvel Universe's biggest players all get together and fight all the biggest supervillains they can't defeat individually, whereas Ultimates 2 is an exploration of what happens when a bunch of ordinary people are turned into super-soldiers and being groomed to fight the real-life war on terror."

This was followed by the one-shot Ultimate Saga (Nov. 2007), a condensed retelling, by writers C. B. Cebulski and Mindy Owens and artist Travis Charest, of the events of Ultimates and Ultimates 2. A third series, Ultimates 3 (Dec 2007 – Sept 2008) was written by Jeph Loeb and illustrated by Joe Madureira.

Mark Millar returned to the Ultimates with a series of shorter miniseries, beginning in 2009 with Ultimate Comics: Avengers, which ran from August 2009 until July 2011.

The Earth-6160 version of the Ultimates began its own comic series on June 5, 2024.

== Plot ==
=== The Ultimates ===
General Nick Fury of S.H.I.E.L.D. establishes a strike force of government-sponsored superhumans which includes Steve Rogers (Captain America); scientist couple Henry and Janet Pym (Giant-Man and the Wasp); Bruce Banner (the Hulk) and Tony Stark (Iron Man). Together, they are based at the S.H.I.E.L.D facility the Triskelion. When Banner injects himself with the super-soldier serum and goes on a bloody rampage as the Hulk, he is eventually stopped by the other superhumans with the aid of Thor. The team then join forces with the mutants Quicksilver and Scarlet Witch and agents Hawkeye and Black Widow against the alien shape-shifters the Chitauri, who are defeated.

=== The Ultimates 2 ===
A year later public opinion has turned against the team when it is discovered that Bruce Banner is in fact the Hulk and was responsible for hundreds of deaths. The team is undermined further when Thor is accused of being an escaped mental patient and is incarcerated. This is the doing of his brother Loki, who also facilitates the creation of a new team of anti-American multi-nationals called the "Liberators". With the aid of the Black Widow – who betrays the team to the Liberators – the Ultimates are captured, but eventually escape and battle the Liberators to the death. With the aid of Asgardian warriors, the Ultimates defeat both Loki and the Liberators. Seeing how having the Ultimates working with the United States government "policing" the world would produce similar results to their battle against the Liberators, the team decided to leave S.H.I.E.L.D. and to continue to work as an independent team instead.

=== The Ultimates 3 ===
Promotional art for cover of The Ultimates 3 #1 (February 2008), by Joe Madureira and Christian Lichtner.

Hank Pym is under house arrest at Ultimates Mansion. One of Pym's Ultron robots drugs him and leaks a sex tape of Stark and the Black Widow to the internet. These distract from the robot's fatal shooting of the Scarlet Witch. Magneto abducts Wanda's corpse and retreats to the Savage Land, where he is confronted by the Ultimates. Pym and Wasp discover the truth about the Ultron robot, which has adopted the identity of Yellowjacket and uses the Ultimates' DNA to create a series of android duplicates. Although the true Ultimates destroy their android counterparts and Yellowjacket, Quicksilver is apparently killed by Hawkeye. The Wasp then invites Pym to return to the Ultimates, and he accepts. The mastermind behind the robot's plot is revealed to be Doctor Doom.

=== New Ultimates ===
The Ultimate Defenders, suddenly with superpowers, steal Thor's hammer from Valkyrie. Hela agrees to release Thor in exchange for a son. Loki arrives in Central Park with an army of monsters.

=== Ultimate Comics: The Ultimates ===
Writer Jonathan Hickman and artist Esad Ribić relaunched the Ultimates with a different lineup consisting of Nick Fury, Iron Man, Thor, Spider-Woman and others.

=== All-New Ultimates ===
Following the conclusion of the miniseries Cataclysm and under the Ultimate Marvel NOW! banner, coinciding with the Marvel Universe All-New Marvel NOW! launch, writer Michel Fiffe and artist Amilcar Pinna brought together a new team, including Spider-Man, the new Black Widow who was formerly Spider-Woman, Kitty Pryde, Bombshell, and Cloak and Dagger. The book ran for 12 issues.

All-New Ultimates has been collected in two trade paperbacks; Volume One is titled Power for Power, collecting issues #1–6; while Volume Two is titled No Gods, No Masters, collecting issues #7-#12.

=== Return ===
When the Maker collaborated with the High Evolutionary to destroy the Superflow that kept the different universes separate in order to merge them into one reality, the Ultimates members Captain America, Iron Man, Giant-Man, Wasp, and Hulk were revived where they were to help Eternity fight the First Firmament. When Earth-616's version of the Ultimates arrived on Counter-Earth to confront Maker about his actions, he ordered the Earth-1610 Ultimates to attack. As both versions of Ultimates concluded that there is no reason to fight each other, Maker killed the Earth-1610 Captain America for disobeying his orders. Upon Maker being defeated, both Ultimates helped Eternity to defeat the First Firmament. Afterwards, the Earth-1610 Ultimates left to pursue Maker.

The Ultimates are later seen on Earth-1610 when it is recreated.

== Other versions ==
=== Earth-616 ===
As part of the All-New, All-Different Marvel branding, the Prime earth version of the Ultimates make their debut where they deal with cosmic threats before they can affect Earth.

=== Ultimate Universe ===
When Maker traveled to Earth-6160 and remade it into his own image during the "Ultimate Invasion" storyline, the Ultimates were later formed to take the world back from him and his council.

== Sales and reception ==
Overall, the Ultimates series has been generally well received by critics and readers, with the first two volumes being praised for the surprisingly mature themes and concepts, the more humanly flawed and layered characterizations of the original Avengers members, Millar's storytelling and writing, Hitch's photo-realistic and cinematic-styled artwork, the modernized, grittier and realistic, yet simultaneously engaging and intriguing re-imagining of the classic Avengers mythos and the political relevance of the first two volumes, while criticism was leveled at the unnecessarily adult-oriented, shallow attempt at maturity and the overly cynical tone and direction of the series, with the third volume: The Ultimates 3 being met with a mostly negative reception, compared to the positive response received by the first two volumes, for the aforementioned reasons. The first volume of Ultimates #1 ranked fourth among the top 300 comics sold for February 2002, based on Diamond Publisher's indexes, with the next three issues ranked second, second, and third, respectively.

Popmatters.com praised Mark Millar's writing in the opening eight issues, stating the writer "is able to walk a very fine line of keeping the story measured yet entertaining". Comics Bulletin, in a review of the "Homeland Security" story arc, states the artwork is "visual magnificence" yet is concerned about the dark writing of the characters stripped of their "super-heroic nobility" and was "disheartened by the book’s tone and cynicism". Shakingthrough.net gave "Homeland Security" a 4.2 out of 5.0 stating it is an "engaging read, filled with intriguing and amusing modern takes on classic Marvel characters" whilst praising Bryan Hitch's artwork by saying it is "amazing, gorgeous artwork, which continues to set the standard for cinematic photo-realism."

Ultimates 2 #1 ranked second among the top 300 comics sold for December 2004, with the next three issues ranked second, fourth and sixth, respectively.

Reviewing Ultimates 2, Curledup.com praised Millar's writing of the classic heroes and the "inclusion of current-day politics" improves the storyline. Comics Bulletin reviewed the final issue #13 but found it anticlimactic with the issue degenerating to a "slug fest". The artwork was praised with the reviewer stating that Bryan Hitch's "artwork has definitely been one of the main elements that will make this series memorable." Den of Geek praised the artwork, with "Bryan Hitch doing some of the best work of his career", but was critical of Millar's writing stating it had "no substance".

Ultimates 3 #1 ranked first in December 2007's Top 300 comics with preorder sales of 131,401, Issue #2 ranked number seven with 105,070 preorders. Issue three ranked better than its predecessor, falling at number five, but had a smaller number of preorders, totaling at 97,210.

Reviewing Ultimates 3, IGN called the book a "reasonably decent experience" although the issue "falters on its own merits", only to later state while reviewing the third issue that "Behind the theatrics and swagger, there's just nothing there to draw me in. These are the characters that I used to enjoy in name only, hollow shells of what they used to be." Alvaro's Comic Boards' review was even harsher, remarking that Ultimates 3 "has somehow managed to entirely miss what made the Ultimates something other than alternative universe Avengers" and adding "this was the worst comic I've read all year".

2011's Ultimate Comics: The Ultimates received highly positive reactions upon its debut. Chad Nevett from Comic Book Resources wrote that "the comic is exciting and sets up a large story that, right now, seems like it could easily end with the destruction of the team. A first issue that starts with its foot on the gas is exactly what’s called for", while IGN gave the first issue 8/10.

== Collected editions ==
Title	Material collected	Published date	ISBN
The Ultimates Vol. 1: Super-Human	Ultimates #1–6	April 2006	978-0785109600
The Ultimates Vol. 2: Homeland Security	Ultimates #7-13	April 2006	978-0785110781
The Ultimates: Ultimate Collection	Ultimates #1–13	October 2004	978-0785110828
The Ultimates 2 Vol. 1: Gods and Monsters	Ultimates 2 #1–6	September 2006	978-0785110934
The Ultimates 2 Vol. 2: Grand Theft America	Ultimates 2 #7–13	January 2007	978-0785117902
The Ultimate Annuals Vol. 1	The Ultimates Annual #1, Ultimate Fantastic Four Annual #1, Ultimate X-Men Annual #1, Ultimate Spider-Man Annual #1	February 2006	978-0785120353
The Ultimate Annuals Vol. 2	The Ultimates Annual #2, Ultimate Fantastic Four Annual #2, Ultimate X-Men Annual #2, Ultimate Spider-Man Annual #2	February 2007	978-0785123712
The Ultimates 2: Ultimate Collection	Ultimates 2 #1–13, Ultimates Annual #1	December 2007	978-0785121381
The Ultimates Omnibus	Ultimates #1–13, Ultimates 2 #1–13, Ultimates Annual #1	June 2009	978-0785137801
The Ultimates 3: Who Killed the Scarlet Witch?	Ultimates 3 #1–5	May 2009	978-0785122692

== In other media ==
=== Marvel Cinematic Universe ===
- Numerous aspects and elements of the Ultimates were utilized for the look and storyline of The Avengers.
- Aspects of Avengers: Age of Ultron were inspired by the Ultimate Marvel Comics.

=== Animation ===
- The Ultimates have been the basis for Ultimate Avengers and Ultimate Avengers 2.
- The Ultimates appear in a self-titled episode of Avengers Assemble as Adaptoid-esque duplicates of the Avengers.

=== Video games ===
- The Ultimates are alluded in Ultimate Spider-Man. A number of posters depicting The Triskelion are seen announcing a movie called The Ultimates.
- Captain America, Thor, Iron Man, Black Widow, Hawkeye and Nick Fury have their Ultimate universe costumes in Marvel: Ultimate Alliance.
- The Ultimates appears at the end of Spider-Man: Battle for New York after Spider-Man battling the Green Goblin in the final level.
- Iron Man and Thor have unlockable skins based on their Ultimate universe costumes in the videogame Marvel's Avengers.

=== Novels ===
Two novels based on the Ultimates have been released:

Tomorrow Men	(ISBN 1-4165-1065-6)	Michael Jan Friedman
The Ultimates: Against All Enemies	(ISBN 1-4165-1071-0)	Alexander C. Irvine

== See also ==
- The Ultimates (comic book)
- The Ultimates 2
- List of Ultimates members
- Ultimate Nick Fury
- Tomorrow Men
- Avengers (comics)
