= List of Ultimate Comics: The Ultimates story arcs =

Ultimate Comics: The Ultimates is an ongoing monthly comic book series published by Marvel Comics that made its debut in September 2011 as part of the second re-launch of Ultimate Marvel. Through the 'Ultimate Universe Reborn' tagline following the "Death of Spider-Man" and written by Jonathan Hickman with art by Esad Ribic, the series also serves as a continuation of elements from Ultimate Comics: Fallout, and exists alongside other relaunched Ultimate Marvel titles including Ultimate Comics: Spider-Man and Ultimate Comics: X-Men. The series continues the stories of the superhero team the Ultimates.

== "The Republic Is Burning" (#1–4) ==
With the recent appearance of two new superhuman threats to the globe—The People in the Southeast Asian Republic and the Children of Tomorrow in Europe—S.H.I.E.L.D. and the Ultimates are spread too thin.

Reed Richards returns to earth with the Children of Tomorrow. In Europe, Asgardians pillage a beer factory, making the European Union activate their new super team, the Excalibur-class super-soldiers led by the new Captain Britain, Jamie Braddock. When the team arrives to confront Odin and the Asgardians, they are interrupted by Thor, who offers Jamie a drink. Jamie, in a display of disrespect, pours the drink on the floor. This upsets Thor and he attacks Jamie and the other European Captains. The battle makes its way to the German desert (left barren after he events of "Ultimatum"), where they discover the dome-shaped structure. While investigating it, Captain Italy is grabbed by a large mechanical hand and pulled inside the structure.

Social unrest in Bangkok leaves the city in flames and Clint Barton loses communication with S.H.I.E.L.D. In Uruguay, Tony Stark boards an Argentinian fleet that appeared with deadly intent, only for his armor to be destroyed, leaving Tony comatose.

The Children of Tomorrow engage Thor and the European Captains, then Richards (still unrevealed to the reader) orders the Children of Tomorrow to travel to Asgard and de-power the Gods. Meanwhile, Tony awakens and Nick Fury orders him to Germany. Asgard is completely destroyed; however, Thor is able to save his son by sending him to the room with no doors and giving him the Mjolnir. Tony arrives in time to save Thor from falling as Asgard disappears.

Two days after the fall of Asgard, Tony reveals that he has been keeping Thor's old harness and hammer safe and has even made improvements; a powerless Thor dons the harness. One week after the fall of Asgard, the City has expanded itself into neighboring European countries; most of Eastern Europe is engulfed and millions are killed. S.H.I.E.L.D. loses communication with the E.D.I. (European Defense Initiative) and gathers a fleet of fighter jets and Heli-Carriers to engage the Children of Tomorrow, but are quickly beaten. In a last-ditch effort, Fury orders the launch of a nuclear missile, but it causes little damage. Thor, once again the most powerful Super-Soldier on the planet, teleports the fleet away before too many lives are lost. Later, Thor tells Tony that it was an honor to call him his friend, after which he teleports himself to the City in an effort to destroy it himself. Thor attempts to get revenge but is beaten by the Children's leader—Reed Richards. Reed sends Thor back with a warning: accept the loss of the European territories and no further action will be taken against the rest of the world.

== "The World" (#5–6) ==
One week after most of Europe was taken over by Reed Richards and the Children of Tomorrow, Nick Fury attempts to meet with the President to discuss the current situation. Tony Stark and Jarvis discuss the situation with the Kratos Club, and his company's involvement with the Montevideo disaster. Jessica Drew arrives in her loft at the Triskelion and noticed a file from Nick Fury highlighting the new Spider-Man; she intends to confront him. At the Pentagon, Hawkeye explains how they are attempting to use the Source that he obtained in Tian to create a new version of the Super-Soldier Serum. Thor and Jane are dining in Stark Tower when Thor is visited by the apparitions of his fellow Asgardians. He is worried about Jane finding out about his potential insanity. Falcon discovers a way to shift the frequency of his DNA and become invisible to the sensors of the City, and attempts to gain intel for Fury. Nick Fury locates and speaks with Steve Rogers, telling him that they need him back.

In New Mexico, Nick Fury pleads with Steve Rogers to return to the Ultimates, to no avail. Steve says that there's too much blood on his hands already and refuses to return. At the Kratos Club in Paris, Tony, along with Jarvis, confront his fellow club members about the recent nuclear bomb detonation in Montevideo. They tell him that their plan was to crash the global market and that they now own 9 percent of the world. At Braddock Manor, in Britain, Jamie Braddock speaks to his bed-ridden brother, Brian, and bids him farewell before leaving. Their father, James Braddock Sr., tells him that Brian does not have long before his cancer kills him. In the City, Maker manages to capture Falcon but tells him that he will grant him free rein in the City so that he can report his findings back to Fury. At the Triskelion, Fury consults with Hawkeye about a plan to retaliate against the Children of Tomorrow involving Tian and Ultimate X.

== "Two Cities, Two Worlds" (#7–12) ==
Black Widow, Hawkeye, Falcon and Nick Fury go to Tian to offer Zorn and Xorn an alliance against the City. The offer is initially refused and the brothers even attempt to speak out to the City, but their Oracle is murdered by the Maker's telepathic powers and both brothers vow justice. The Hulk attacks the City with the promise of Betty Ross's release by S.H.I.E.L.D.'s new director. Captain Britain and Spider-Woman are arrested by S.H.I.E.L.D. soldiers. Other soldiers attempt to do the same to Thor and Tony Stark, who easily overpower them. The Maker manipulates the Hulk into sharing his beliefs and hate for America as the President launches all of the country's nuclear warheads to attack the City. The People attack the City but are overwhelmed by The Children until the all-consuming Zorn implodes and causes great damage to the Dome. In retaliation for the attacks, the Maker destroys Congress and assassinates the President.

Secretary Howard becomes the new President of the United States, and Agent Flumm replaces Nick Fury as director of S.H.I.E.L.D. and labels the Ultimates as fugitives. Fury disappears and Black Widow, Hawkeye and Falcon escape S.H.I.E.L.D. soldiers. Stark's tumour re-emerges and he begins to see hallucinations of his child-self; he informs Sue Storm of the identity of the Maker. Thor's son Modi emerges from the World Tree with Mjolnir in his hands, and Stark asks his ex-lover and former S.H.I.E.L.D. director Carol Danvers to help Thor and himself speak with the new President. They present him with a plan to destroy the City using a gigantic robot, which the President promptly thinks of as outlandish. The President and the Maker have a truce which requires Stark's surrender to the Dome. Tony's tumour somehow projects itself as a technokinetic hallucination of his child-self to the central intelligence machine, the City itself, and tells it to reveal to the Children of Tomorrow that Richards is responsible for the murder of the House of Representatives and is therefore unfit for leadership. It creates Tony's imagined robot, which attacks Richards but finds itself weak against the Hulk, who has been injected with the Giant-Man serum. Invisible Woman arrives with Thor to defeat the Hulk and Susan traps her ex-lover Richards in a small psychic bubble. Tony is grateful for his sentient tumour and the Ultimates celebrate the defeat of the Maker. As the United States begins to tumble into turmoil with states seeking secession, Steve Rogers begins his journey back to the United States.

== Collected editions ==
Title	Material collected	Format	ISBN	Release date
Volume 1	Ultimate Comics: Ultimates #1–6	HC	ISBN 0-7851-5717-4	2012-03-12
Volume 1	Ultimate Comics: Ultimates #1–6	SC	ISBN 1-84653-504-2	2012-03-14
Volume 2	Ultimate Comics: Ultimates #7–12	HC	ISBN 0-7851-5719-0	2012-08-01
Volume 2	Ultimate Comics: Ultimates #7–12	SC		

== See also ==
- Ultimate Comics: The Ultimates
- Ultimates
- Ultimate Comics: Thor
- Ultimate Comics: Fallout
- Ultimate Comics: Hawkeye
