= List of Ultimates members =

This page lists the known members of the Ultimates.

== Ultimates ==
The Ultimates are the alternative Marvel universe, Ultimate Marvel, equivalent to the Avengers.

=== Founding Members ===
Character	Real Name	Joined in	Notes
Nick Fury	General Nicholas Joseph "Nick" Fury	The Ultimates #1	
Iron Man	Antonio "Tony" Stark	The Ultimates #2	
Giant-Man	Dr. Henry "Hank" Jonathan Pym	The Ultimates #2	Deceased as of Ultimatum #3; restored in Ultimates 2 Vol 2 #9
Wasp	Janet Pym	The Ultimates #2	Once married to Dr. Hank Pym. Former team leader. Deceased as of Ultimatum #2; restored in Ultimates 2 Vol 2 #9
Captain America	Steven "Steve" Rogers	The Ultimates #3	Original leader, relinquished leadership to the Wasp. Leaves team after the Death of Spider-Man Rejoins in Ultimate Comics Ultimates #13.
Thor	Thor Odinson a.k.a. Thorlief Golmen	The Ultimates #6	
Hulk	Bruce Banner	The Ultimates #2 (as Banner); The Ultimates #13 (as Hulk)	

=== Shadow Team ===
Shadow team was transferred to Ultimates and left SHIELD employment with the main team.

Character	Real Name	Joined in	Notes
Hawkeye	Clinton Francis Barton	The Ultimates #7	
Black Widow	Natasha Romanova	The Ultimates #7	Betrayed the team. Deceased as of Ultimates 2.
Quicksilver	Pietro Lensherr	The Ultimates #7	Killed by Kang
Scarlet Witch	Wanda Lensherr	The Ultimates #7	Killed by Ultron.

=== Later Recruits ===
Character	Real Name	Joined in	Notes
Valkyrie	Barbara Denton-Norriss	The Ultimates vol. 3 #1	Deceased as of Ultimate Comics: New Ultimates.
Black Panther	T'Challa Udaku	The Ultimates vol. 3 #1	Left the team to go to Hollywood, along with Ka-Zar and Shanna.
Zarda	Claire Debussy	Ultimate Power #9	Left Ultimate Universe after Ultimate Comics: New Ultimates.
Ka-Zar		Ultimate Comics: New Ultimates #1	Left the team to go to Hollywood, along with Black Panther.
Shanna		Ultimate Comics: New Ultimates #1	Left the team to go to Hollywood, along with Black Panther.
Ant-Man	Scott Lang	Ultimate Comics: Avengers vs New Ultimates #1	
Black Widow	Monica Chang	Ultimate Comics: Avengers vs New Ultimates #1	Deceased as of Miles Morales: Ultimate Spider-Man #3.
Spider-Woman	Jessica Drew	Ultimate Comics: The Ultimates #3	Left team
Falcon	Samuel Wilson	Ultimate Comics: The Ultimates #5	
Captain Britain	Jamie Braddock	Ultimate Comics: The Ultimates #8	
Spider-Man	Miles Morales	Ultimate Comics: Spider-Man Vol 2 #16	Left team after United We Stand
Wasp	Cassandra Lang	Ultimate Comics: The Ultimates #19	Left team to join Nick Fury's Howling Commandos
Invisible Woman	Sue Storm	Ultimate Comics: The Ultimates #25	
Human Torch	Johnny Storm	Ultimate Comics: The Ultimates #30	
Thing	Ben Grimm	Ultimate Comics: The Ultimates #30	
Sentry	Robert "Bob" Reynolds	Ultimate Comics: The Ultimates #28	
Ironheart	Riri Williams	Spider-Men II #5	

== West Coast Ultimates ==
In the Ultimate Marvel reality, a secret team of Ultimates was formed in the Ultimate Comics: The Ultimates.

Character	Real Name	Debuted in	Notes
Quake	Daisy Johnson	Ultimate Comics: The Ultimates #22	Team leader
Tigra	Marie Grant	Ultimate Comics: The Ultimates #22	
Wonder Man	Simon Williams	Ultimate Comics: The Ultimates #22	
Vision	Robert Mitchell	Ultimate Comics: The Ultimates #22	
Black Knight	Dane Whitman	Ultimate Comics: The Ultimates #22	

== Avengers ==
In the alternative Marvel universe, Ultimate Marvel, the Avengers are a relaunch of the Ultimates project under SHIELD command.

Character	Real Name	Debuted in	Notes
Nick Fury	General Nicholas Joseph "Nick" Fury	The Ultimates #1	
Gregory Stark		Ultimate Comics Avengers #1	Went rogue, deceased as of Ultimate Comics: Avengers vs New Ultimates #6
Hawkeye	Clinton Francis Barton	The Ultimates #4	
War Machine	James Rhodes	Ultimate Iron Man #3	
Red Wasp	Dr. Petra Larkov	Ultimates vol. 2 #10	
Perun		Ultimates vol. 2 #10	Deceased as of Ultimate Comics: Avengers 3 #5
Black Widow	Monica Chang	Ultimate Comics: Avengers #2	
Nerd Hulk		Ultimate Comics: Avengers #2	Deceased as of Ultimate Comics Avengers vol.3 #6
Tyrone Cash	Dr. Leonard Williams	Ultimate Comics: Avengers #2	Deceased as of Ultimate Comics: Avengers vs New Ultimates #5
The Spider		Ultimate Comics: Avengers #3	Went rogue, deceased as of Ultimate Comics: Avengers vs New Ultimates #6
Punisher	Frank Castle	Ultimate Marvel Team-Up #6	
Blade	Eric Brooks	Ultimate Spider-Man #95	

== Reserves ==
The Reserves were S.H.I.E.L.D. agents in development, designated as backup and/or for additional training before joining the Ultimates.

Character	Real Name	Debuted in	Notes
Rocketmen (3)	unknown, unknown, (3rd) Dexter	The Ultimates Annual #1	
Giant-Men / Goliaths	Bill Foster (dead), David Scotty (dead), Pete, several unnamed (x5) Scott Lang	The Ultimates Annual #1 or Ultimates 2 No. 6	Seven men injected with a modified version of Hank Pym's "Giant Man" Formula, allowing them to grow to just under 200 feet (61 m) in height. All the Giant-Men were seemingly killed by the Liberators' foot soldiers. Seven more were awaiting approval for active duty. Lang is later inducted into the New Ultimates as the last "Giant Man".
"Reserve Captain America"	Lieberman	The Ultimates Annual #1	He was injected with the Super-Soldier serum and, as a result, exhibited enhanced speed and strength, as well as nearly indestructible skin. He also possessed an innate connection to the S.H.I.E.L.D. supercomputer. Lieberman was intended to replace Captain America in case he was killed or went rogue. However, his central nervous system collapsed after he saved 57 people from a fire in New York City. The strain of the super-soldier serum killed him. It is revealed that Lieberman is the latest casualty in trying to replicate Captain America's Super-Soldier serum and there have been several other soldiers like him who died the same way.
Thunderbolt		The Ultimates Annual #1	working on powers
Intangi-Girl		The Ultimates Annual #1	working on powers
	Owen	The Ultimates Annual #1	working on powers
	Rusk	The Ultimates Annual #1	working on powers
	O'Donahue	The Ultimates Annual #1	working on powers
Son of Satan	Daimon Hellstrom	The Ultimates Annual #1	S.H.I.E.L.D. undercover agent/reserve hero
Four Seasons sub group
Summer		The Ultimates Vol. 1 Annual 1	
Winter		The Ultimates Vol. 1 Annual 1	
Fall		The Ultimates Vol. 1 Annual 1	
Spring		The Ultimates Vol. 1 Annual 1	
Giant-Woman Squad	Cassie Lang, unknown, unknown	Ultimate Comics: Ultimates #17	Similar to the earlier Giant-Men project, the Giant-Women consist of female agents with costumes and growth abilities similar to those of Giant-Man.

== See also ==
- Ultimates
- List of Avengers members
