= Ultimate Fallout =

Comic book

- Cover of Ultimate Fallout 1 ( 2011), art by Mark Bagley, Andy Lanning & Justin Ponsor

Publication information
- Publisher: Ultimate Marvel (Marvel Comics)
- Schedule: Weekly
- Format: Limited series
- Genre: Superhero
- Publication date: July – August 2011
- No. of issues: 6
- Main character(s): Mary Jane Watson; Gwen Stacy; Ultimates; Nick Fury

Creative team
- Written by: Brian Michael Bendis; Jonathan Hickman; Nick Spencer
- Penciller(s): Mark Bagley; Gabriel Hardman; Bryan Hitch; Lee Garbett; Steve Kurth; Eric Nguyen; Carlo Pagulayan; Sara Pichelli; Salvador Larroca; Clayton Crain; Luke Ross; Billy Tan; Mitch Breitweiser

Ultimate Comics: Fallout is a comic book limited series published by Marvel Comics that debuted in July 2011 as part of the second re-launch of the Ultimate Universe. The story itself deals mainly with the aftermath of the "Death of Spider-Man" storyline, and focuses on the impact of the death of Spider-Man on many Ultimate Marvel characters, including his close friends and family. It is written by Brian Michael Bendis, Jonathan Hickman, and Nick Spencer. It also introduced a new art style by Gabriel Hardman that would go on to be featured in the sequel series Ultimate Comics: Spider-Man and the crossover Spider-Men.

== Background ==
The series takes place in the Ultimate Universe, following both Ultimate Comics: Avengers, Ultimate Comics: X, and specifically the "Death of Spider-Man" in Ultimate Comics: Spider-Man. At the same time, the series represents the beginning of the second re-launch (or Rebirth) of Ultimate Marvel, which would bring about new ongoing titles such as Ultimate Comics: Ultimates, Ultimate Comics: X-Men, and a re-launched Ultimate Comics: Spider-Man featuring a new Spider-Man. Jonathan Hickman, Nick Spencer, and Brian Michael Bendis represent the three writers of these upcoming respective books, as well as the co-writers to Fallout itself.

== Plot summary ==
=== Chapter One ===
- Spider-Man R.I.P.: writer Brian Michael Bendis, artist Mark Bagley

In the aftermath of his death match against the Green Goblin, Spider-Man has died in the arms of Aunt May and Mary Jane Watson. The death of Spider-Man has affected everyone. Gwen Stacy considers herself a curse. J. Jonah Jameson knew that Peter Parker was Spider-Man and couldn't think of a way to print this out for the Daily Bugle. Both the Human Torch and Kitty Pryde are shown to be saddened by the loss of their friend. Tony Stark foots the bill for the largest funeral in New York. At the funeral, Aunt May is visited by a young girl who Spider-Man once saved from a fire. Aunt May is then approached by a remorseful Captain America who states that what happened to Peter was his fault. Mary Jane Watson even blames Nick Fury for Peter's death.

=== Chapter Two ===
- Captain America: writer Brian Michael Bendis, artist Gabriel Hardman
- Thor: writer Jonathan Hickman, artist Bryan Hitch
- Rogue: writer Nick Spencer, artist Lee Garbett

When Captain America tells Aunt May that Spider-Man "wasn't ready to be one of the Ultimates" and that the gunshot was meant for him, Aunt May scolds Captain America for making the decision that cost her the life of Peter Parker. Aunt May manages to find condolence from J. Jonah Jameson. The grievances are reached in different ways, ranging from Thor and Rogue. Meanwhile, Mary Jane plans her retribution, stating that Nick Fury and his team of superheroes are responsible for Spider-Man's death.

=== Chapter Three ===
- Tony Stark: writer Jonathan Hickman, artist Steve Kurth
- Kitty Pryde: writer Nick Spencer, artist Eric Nguyen
- Karen Grant & The Hulk: writer Jonathan Hickman, artist Carlo Pagulayan

While at Spider-Man's funeral, Tony Stark has a flashback revolving around his brother Gregory Stark's funeral. During that time, he had an encounter with Jonathan Blackhaven of Blackhaven Pharmaceuticals who asked Tony to finish his brother's work. Meanwhile, Kitty Pryde decides to go into hiding with Human Torch and Iceman whilst Karen Grant (the alias of Jean Grey) helps Bruce Banner remember the first time he lost control and transformed into the Hulk when he first fought Spider-Man.

=== Chapter Four ===
- Spider-Man: writer Brian Michael Bendis, artist Sara Pichelli
- Reed Richards: writer Jonathan Hickman, artist Salvador Larroca
- Valerie Cooper: writer Nick Spencer, artist Clayton Crain

Following his release from prison, Kangaroo assaults a man who owes him money. Just then, someone in a Spider-Man costume ends up fighting Kangaroo. After defeating Kangaroo, some people of New York expressed disapproval of his actions, stating that wearing Peter's costume was disrespectful. Upon heading to the rooftop, this Spider-Man unmasks himself to be an African-American/Latino boy named Miles Morales who states that it is in bad taste to wear a Spider-Man costume. Meanwhile, Mister Fantastic is revealed to be alive in the N-Zone with a horrible scar covering his right face, claiming that the heroes have ruined his chances of making the world a better place. He starts to rebuild his lab out of the remains from his last battle and then activates a machine that transports him to an unknown jungle. Upon building a new lab, he gathers together a small group of people and informs them that he will be sealing them in a dome and that they must evolve in order to survive. While these events are occurring, a government official begins to prepare for an announcement that will tell the world the truth about where the mutant gene came from.

=== Chapter Five ===
- Quicksilver: writer Nick Spencer, artist Luke Ross
- Nick Fury: writer Jonathan Hickman, artist Billy Tan

Philip Hanstead meets with Pietro Lensherr to carry out some business in regards to the mutant race. Meanwhile, Nick Fury is told that the European Union has reconstituted the Super-Soldier Program which will be led by Jamie Braddock as the new Captain Britain. There are also reports that the Southeast Asian Republic (SEAR) is attempting to start their own Super-Soldier project, and tensions between Argentina and Uruguay are rising to the point of all out war. To make matters even worse, Fury is told by a White House representative that the President of the United States is planning on cutting S.H.I.E.L.D.'s budget by thirty percent, leaving Fury to wonder how he can protect the United States against growing threats with dwindling resources.

=== Chapter Six ===
- Aunt May, Gwen Stacy & Mary Jane: writer Brian Michael Bendis, artist Mark Bagley
- Kitty, Bobby & Johnny: writer Nick Spencer, artist Eric Nguyen
- Nick Fury: writer Jonathan Hickman, artist Mitch Breitweiser

Aunt May and Gwen Stacy struggle with the attention that came with Peter's death and plan to take up Tony Stark's offer to be relocated to anywhere in the world, deciding to move to one of Stark's villas in France. Meanwhile, Kitty Pryde, Bobby Drake, and Johnny Storm take shelter in the former home of the Morlocks whilst Nick Fury continues to prepare for an upcoming international crisis after Captain America resigns from S.H.I.E.L.D. Mary Jane is seen still writing her article about Spider-Man's death when Nick Fury suddenly appears in her room. He tells Mary Jane that he loved Peter and was trying to groom him to become a great man like his father. However, he admits that he fears he pushed Peter too hard and blames himself for his death. The final panel shows Nick Fury crying due to his guilt.

== Characters ==
=== Parker family and friends ===
- May Parker: Peter's aunt, who knew and accepted his role as Spider-Man.
- Mary Jane Watson: Peter's girlfriend and an aspiring journalist, who is one of the first people to learn he was Spider-Man.
- Gwen Stacy: Ex-girlfriend of Peter's, who has been living with the Parkers for a long time now.
- Johnny Storm/Human Torch: Former member of the Fantastic Four and best friend to Peter, he had only fairly recently moved into the Parker household.
- Kitty Pryde/Shroud: Former member of the X-Men and ex-girlfriend of Peter Parker.
- Bobby Drake/Iceman: Former member of the X-Men who recently moved into the Parker household.
- J. Jonah Jameson: Former boss to Peter Parker and enemy of Spider-Man, he discovered the connection just prior to Spider-Man's death and was a staunch ally of Peter after that.
- Flash Thompson: Former classmate and bully to Peter Parker.

=== Other characters ===
- Bruce Banner/Hulk: Still trying to maintain control over his Hulk persona.
- Jean Grey/Karen Grant: Trying her best to help control the Hulk.
- Reed Richards/Mister Fantastic: Former member of the Fantastic Four, recently defeated by the Heroes of Earth after he appeared to have gone mad.
- Rogue: First appearance since Ultimatum. She believes the end of the world is coming.
- Miles Morales/Spider-Man II: An African-American/Hispanic teenager who assumes the identity as Spider-Man after Peter's death.
- Pietro Lensheer/Quicksilver: Current leader of the Brotherhood of Evil Mutants.
- Ultimates
  - Steve Rogers/Captain America: Blames himself for Peter's death and quits the Ultimates at the end of "Ultimate Fallout."
  - Tony Stark/Iron Man: Helping the Parker family, but also dealing with the death of his own brother Gregory Stark.
  - Thor: Believes Peter died a heroic death and sighted his spirit in Asgard.
  - Nick Fury: Head of S.H.I.E.L.D. and blamed for Peter's death by Mary Jane (and himself).

== Reception ==
- Ultimate Comics: Fallout #1 received a rating of 8.0 out of 10 from IGN, and a rating of 3.5 out of 5 from Comic Book Resources.
- Ultimate Comics: Fallout #3 received a rating of 7.0 out of 10 from IGN.
- Ultimate Comics: Fallout #4 received a rating of 8.0 out of 10 from IGN, and a rating of 4 out of 5 from Comic Book Resources.
- Ultimate Comics: Fallout #5 received a rating of 7.5 out of 10 from IGN.
- Ultimate Comics: Fallout #6 received a rating of 7.5 out of 10 from IGN. and a rating of 2 out of 5 from Comic Book Resources.

=== Reaction and controversy ===
Response to the introduction of Miles Morales as the new Spider-Man had been generally mixed, creating a certain amount of controversy. Some members of the media had come out in support of the decision, which was prompted by author Brian Michael Bendis' discovery that Community actor Donald Glover had campaigned for the role of Spider-Man in The Amazing Spider-Man.

However, many vicious reactions broke out across the web before the storyline even came to completion, with notable critical views coming from high-profile figures such as Glenn Beck (who blamed Michelle Obama). While some had alleged this reaction to be an extension of racism, many simply argued that Spider-Man has always been, and always will be Peter Parker, whilst others have cited the many unsuccessful previous attempts to change Spider-Man's past or his identity. Some fans have also criticized his age, as the content of comic books has increased in adult themes over the years, making a 13-year-old hero in the Ultimate universe somewhat inaccessible to many.

== Collected editions ==
Title	Material collected	Published date	ISBN
Ultimate Comics: Fallout	Ultimate Comics: Fallout #1-6	December 2011	978-0785159124

== See also ==
- Ultimate Comics: Spider-Man
- Ultimate Comics: X-Men
- Ultimate Comics: Ultimates
