= Ultimate Comics: Doomsday =

Comic book series

- Cover of Ultimate Enemy 1 (Jan 2010 Marvel Comics), art by Mark Farmer and Ed McGuinness

Publication information
- Publisher: Marvel Comics
- Schedule: Monthly
- Title(s): Ultimate Enemy; Ultimate Mystery; Ultimate Doom
- Formats: Original material for the series has been published as a set of limited series.
- Genre: Superhero
- Publication date: January 2010 – March 2011
- Number of issues: 12
- Main character(s): Spider-Woman; Fantastic Four; Spider-Man; Nick Fury; Mahr Vehl; Carol Danvers; Nova; Doctor Octopus; Roxxon Brain Trust

Creative team
- Writer(s): Brian Michael Bendis
- Penciller(s): Rafa Sandoval
- Editor(s): Sana Amanat; Mark Paniccia; Joe Quesada

Reprints
- Collected editions
- Hardcover: ISBN 0-7851-4776-4

Ultimate Comics: Doomsday is a collection of three 4-issue comic book limited series published by Marvel Comics. All three series (Ultimate Enemy, Ultimate Mystery, and Ultimate Doom) are set in the Ultimate Marvel universe, and are written by Brian Michael Bendis with art by Rafa Sandoval.

== Plot summary ==
The series mainly focuses on what remains of the Fantastic Four after Ultimatum, specifically dealing with an unknown threat (revealed later) trying to alter the entire Ultimate Universe, in the process causing a significant amount of destruction. While the previous members of the Fantastic Four remain prominent throughout the series, many other characters from different strands of the Ultimate Universe also feature.

== Collected editions ==
The entire series has been collected into the following hardcover volume:

Title	Material collected	Published date	ISBN
Ultimate Comics: Doomsday	Ultimate Enemy #1-4, Ultimate Mystery #1-4, Ultimate Doom #1-4	April 2011	978-0785147763

== See also ==
- Ultimate Fantastic Four
- Ultimate Requiem
- Ultimate Comics: Spider-Man
