= Ultimate Comics: X-Men =

Monthly comic book series

- Cover of Ultimate Comics: X-Men #1 (September 2011 Marvel Comics). Art by Kaare Andrews.

Publication information
- Publisher: Ultimate Marvel (Marvel Comics)
- Schedule: Monthly
- Format: Ongoing series
- Genre: Superhero
- Publication date: September 2011 – October 2013
- No. of issues: 33

Creative team
- Written by: Nick Spencer; Brian Wood
- Artist(s): Paco Medina; Carlo Barberi; Reilly Brown

Ultimate Comics: X-Men was an ongoing monthly comic-book series published by Marvel Comics. It made its debut in September 2011 as part of the second re-launch of "Ultimate Marvel", though was canceled in 2013. Through the "Ultimate Universe Reborn" tagline following the "Death of Spider-Man", and written by Nick Spencer with art by Paco Medina, the series serves as a continuation of earlier titles such as Ultimate X-Men, Ultimate Comics: X, and the Ultimate Comics: Fallout mini-series. This title also exists alongside other relaunched Ultimate Marvel works, including Ultimate Comics: Spider-Man and Ultimate Comics: Ultimates.

Ultimate Comics X-Men was relaunched on March 6, 2024 with Peach Momoko's Ultimate X-Men. Ultimate Universe #1.

== Publication preview ==
It was announced in May 2011 that Ultimate X-Men would be re-launched under the "Ultimate Comics Universe Reborn" tagline. Written by Nick Spencer, and illustrated by Paco Medina, the title was called Ultimate Comics: X-Men. Announced members of the X-Men included Jimmy Hudson, Kitty Pryde (returning from her departure to appear in Ultimate Spider-Man), Iceman, Rogue, and Johnny Storm (formerly of the Fantastic Four). The story also apparently expanded upon Ultimate Origins’ revelation of the mutant race actually being the result of a government bio-experiment. The first issue was released in September, along with the new re-launch of Ultimate Comics: Spider-Man and after the releases of Ultimate Comics: Fallout, Ultimate Comics: Ultimates, and Ultimate Comics: Hawkeye.

"As a result of Magneto's attack that we saw in Ultimatum, the government has taken a much more aggressive stance," Spencer said during an interview. "We're really in a Days of Future Past-type scenario." As revealed in Ultimate Origins, mutants in the Ultimate Universe are not the next step in evolution, but instead a super-soldier attempt gone wrong. Spencer said that "information is going to go public, and the entire world is going to learn that the government created mutants."

Marvel editor-in-chief Axel Alonso also suggested a possible future crossover between Ultimate Comics: Ultimates, and whatever form the Ultimate Comics: Spider-Man series takes after Death of Spider-Man. Spencer also told Newsarama that it's a liberating feeling to be writing an X-Men comic in a world where Cyclops, Wolverine, Professor Charles Xavier, and Magneto are all dead.

"I think it's what makes it more exciting. These kids are living in a world where the legends are dead. This is more than just 'the dream is dead,' this is, 'both sides of the argument are dead.' That is just so much more fascinating. To me, what was really intriguing to me about where they were now is just in that. These kids have heard both sides, and seen both sides fail miserably. A lot of X-books have been built around that idea, that we're just one step away from everything going to Hell, and in the Ultimate Universe, that's happened. We're there. It's too late to put the genie back in the bottle. This relationship between humans and mutants is not going to repair itself."

== Contributors ==
This list only includes comics already released.

Writers

- Nick Spencer (#s 1–12; 2011–2012)
- Brian Wood (#s 13–33, 18.1; 2012–2013)

Artists

- Paco Medina (#s 1–6; 2011–2012)
- Carlo Barberi (#s 6–8; 2012)
- Paco Medina (#s 9–16; 2012)
- Reilly Brown (#s 13–14; 2012)
- Carlo Barberi (#s 16–23; 2012–2013)
- Filipe Andrade (# 18.1; 2012)
- Mahmud Asrar (#s 24–28; 2013)
- Alvaro Martinez (#s 29–33; 2013)

== Plot ==
=== Ultimate Comics: X-Men by Nick Spencer Vol. 1 ===
Valerie Cooper addresses the media regarding the recently released news that mutants are being man-made at a lab in Canada using experiments on the mutant Wolverine. She states that conditions within the mutant internment camps are good and, in some cases, better for some of the inmates compared to their lives before being detained. Jimmy Hudson, hearing the news about his biological father, decides to travel to Canada to investigate further. However, he is captured and brought to William Stryker by one of his followers.

Meanwhile, Rogue is being hunted by a Nimrod Sentinel, a government-created mutant-hunting machine. Shroud, Iceman, and Human Torch intervene. The Sentinels identify the mutants, excluding Johnny, and give them an opportunity to surrender. The group manages to escape and meets on a building rooftop.

Valerie Cooper enters the White House to meet with the President when she sees Nick Fury leave in a hurry. She finds Quicksilver sitting with the President and he introduces himself. They discuss White House security measures against possible mutant attacks, when Pietro mentions that he has a plan involving Cerebro.

In the Morlock tunnels, Kitty, Johnny, Jimmy, and Iceman argue over whether or not to help the mutants, which Kitty disagrees with. Kitty punches Johnny and walks away. They head out on their mission to take Stryker down. Upset, Kitty speaks with a young mutant who brought Jimmy to them earlier. He tells her that Rogue is friends with Stryker. Rogue approached Stryker a while ago, asking for mercy. She intends to lead the others into a trap.

Stryker is about to demonstrate his mercy on another young mutant when Jimmy Hudson, Iceman, Human Torch and Rogue appear and warn him to let her go. Stryker reveals that Rogue is his ally and she immediately subdues both Johnny and Iceman using Iceman's absorbed powers. Stryker, two weeks prior, promised Rogue to free her of her mutant abilities if she brought the others to him. Stryker readies to kill Jimmy but Rogue demands that he fulfill his side of their deal before he lays a hand on them. He is about to heal her when the Shroud arrives and punches Stryker, knocking him to the ground.

At the White House, Pietro uses Cerebra to pinpoint the locations of every mutant on Earth, allowing the President to launch a massive Sentinel attack. Valerie Cooper discovers that Stryker is a mutant himself with technopathic abilities, allowing him to directly control the Sentinels.

In the Morlock tunnels, Kitty confronts Rogue about her betrayal but Rogue reveals that she had a plan to get Stryker to trust her enough to allow her to touch him when he attempts to "heal" her. She was going to take his ability and use it on him, rendering him powerless. Suddenly, they are interrupted by an apparition of a man calling himself the Oracle of Change, telling them to come to Tian, formerly known as the S.E.A.R.. Rogue reveals that the man she was referring to as God, the man who told her about Tian and how to take down Stryker, was Charles Xavier, who visited her in a church three weeks earlier.

=== Ultimate Comics: X-Men by Nick Spencer Vol. 2 ===
In later issues, there is an uprising in mutant reservation Camp Angel, where Colossus is freed. The book goes on to describe Kitty Pryde and her companions' journey west to deal with Stryker's sentinels.

=== Ultimate Comics Divided We Fall, United We Stand ===
After the battle and the end of the Sentinel threat, Kitty Pryde meets with the now President Captain America. He wants to put them in internment camps. Kitty disagrees with this course of action and they part ways.

=== Ultimate Comics X-Men by Brian Wood Vol. 1 ===
Ultimately, most of the mutants in the United States take the cure. Kitty Pryde and a band of about twenty mutants, including Jimmy Hudson, Rogue, Storm, and Mach Two, rebel. Mach Two challenges Kitty's leadership but the group votes to place her in that position. Mach Two continues to plot secretly to undermine Kitty's leadership position. Kitty and Jimmy form a romantic relationship. The land on the reservation is irradiated, but mutants Storm, Zero, and Blackheath create a mutant seed that can grow in any environment.

== Characters ==
- Kitty Pryde/Shroud: After the events of Ultimatum, Kitty Pryde moved back home with her mother in Queens and took up the new mantle of "Shroud". She had been appearing regularly in Ultimate Comics: Spider-Man, and even made an appearance in Ultimate Comics: X when she found Wolverine's son Jimmy and helped him discover his mutant gifts. She is considered to be the leader of the team. She now is leader of a domestic terrorist group fighting to protect the lives of mutants after the government decided to let the Sentinels take control of the Southwestern states.
- Bobby Drake/Iceman: After being kicked out of his own house following Ultimatum, Bobby Drake was able to live temporarily with Peter Parker and pass as one of his cousins. He was there for the final battle against Norman Osborn which resulted in Spider-Man's death, and was announced as part of the new X-Men team. He eventually begins a relationship with Husk, and after another fight between Nomi and Kitty in Utopia, leaves with Nomi's sect of mutants and Husk.
- Marian Carlyle/Rogue: Hiding ever since the events of Ultimatum, Marian has been hearing voices recently that she believe somehow come from 'God'.
- Jimmy Hudson: After discovering his mutant powers for the first time, and meeting Kitty Pryde, Jimmy Hudson (the son of Wolverine), joined Karen Grant/Jean Grey's team and starred in Ultimate Comics: X, though in the end he decides to leave this team in search for answers about his father.
- Husk: A mutant from the Southwest who was imprisoned in a government camp before being rescued by Kitty and co.

=== Supporting cast ===
- Johnny Storm/Human Torch: After the disbanding of the Fantastic Four, Johnny Storm also went to live with best friend Peter Parker, passing as one of his cousins along with Iceman. He participated in the climactic battle against Norman Osborn, and was with Peter in his last few moments. He was also announced as part of the new X-Men team, despite not actually being a mutant. Kitty offers to let Johnny join her group, but he refuses because though he loves his group, he can not put his life on the line for a cause he is not a part of, or fully comprehend. Also, he did not like the idea of leaving the group of mutant kids to fend for themselves while they are fighting a war. He states that he is staying behind to watch over the kids. He is last seen being pulled out of a manhole in poor condition.
- Pietro Lensherr/Quicksilver: Former member of the Brotherhood of Mutants, the Ultimates, and the son of Magneto. It is unclear what his exact motives are now.
- Wanda Lensherr/Scarlet Witch: Former member of the Brotherhood of Mutants, the Ultimates, and the daughter of Magneto, revealed to be alive in Ultimate Comics: X.
- Valerie Cooper: Special Liaison to the President on Superhuman & Mutant Affairs.
- Ultimate X: S.H.I.E.L.D.'s new covert mutant team that includes Karen Grant, a.k.a. Jean Grey, Liz Allan, a.k.a. Firestar, Derek Morgan a.k.a. The Guardian, and Bruce Banner, a.k.a. the Hulk. Jimmy Hudson leaves this team just prior to them undertaking a mission in the S.E.A.R. (South East Asian Republic) in the Ultimate Comics: Hawkeye miniseries.

=== Enemies ===
With respect to the threats, Spencer’s comments include "the government for one. It's hunting season. The means of hunting has become significantly more effective Sentinels known as Nimrods. Pretenders to Magneto's throne will be in legion. Also a major adversary will rise up on the other side of the globe as the series' major Big Bad". William Stryker and the Purifiers eventually appeared to be the main adversaries as they launched a major attack on the United States Government after learning how they created mutants.

== Collected editions ==
Ultimate Comics: X-Men has been collected in the following trade paperbacks:

Title	Material collected	ISBN	Release date
Ultimate Comics: X-Men by Nick Spencer Vol. 1	Ultimate Comics: X-Men #1–6	0-7851-4015-8	2012-04-04
Ultimate Comics: X-Men by Nick Spencer Vol. 2	Ultimate Comics: X-Men #7–12	0-7851-6133-3	2012-08-08
Ultimate Comics Divided We Fall, United We Stand	Ultimate Comics: X-Men #13–18, Ultimate Comics Ultimates #13-18, Ultimate Comics Spider-Man Vol. 2 #13-18	978-0785167815	2013-02-12
Ultimate Comics X-Men by Brian Wood Vol. 1	Ultimate Comics X-Men #18.1, 19-23	978-0785161363	2013-06-11
Ultimate Comics X-Men by Brian Wood Vol. 2	Ultimate Comics X-Men #24-28	978-0785167204	2013-09-24
Ultimate Comics X-Men by Brian Wood Vol. 3	Ultimate Comics X-Men #29-33	978-0785167211	2014-03-04
Cataclysm: The Ultimates' Last Stand	Cataclysm: Ultimate Spider-Man #1-3, Cataclysm: The Ultimates' Last Stand #1-5, Cataclysm: Ultimate X-Men #1-3, Cataclysm: Ultimates #1-3, Hunger #1-4, Cataclysm #0.1, Survive #1	978-0785189190	2014-03-18
