= List of Ultimate Spider-Man story arcs =

Featured here is a chronological list of story arcs in the comic book series Ultimate Spider-Man, created by Brian Michael Bendis and Bill Jemas, and drawn by Mark Bagley until Stuart Immonen replaced him. Ultimate Spider-Man is a teenage drama, in background contrast to the adult Spider-Man in the Marvel continuity.

== Ultimate Spider-Man ==
=== "Power and Responsibility" (#1–7) ===
- Published: October 2000 – May 2001
- Creative Team: Brian Michael Bendis (writing) / Mark Bagley (art)
- Plot outline: During a field trip to Osborn Industries, Peter Parker is bitten by a genetically mutated spider. The spider was part of the scientific experimentation there and had been injected with a formula that Norman Osborn had created called OZ. Kong, one of Peter's classmates kills the spider before anyone could retrieve it. Osborn decides to track Peter's progress as he now has the last of the formula in his blood. After several instances of fainting and displaying extraordinary strength and reflexes, Peter realizes the bite gave him spider-like powers. On one occasion, Peter accidentally breaks Flash Thompson's hand when he tries to fight him, a bully who has been tormenting Parker for years. When Flash's family attempt to sue, Peter becomes part of a local wrestling circuit as the masked "Amazing Spider-Man" to anonymously pay for his Aunt May and Uncle Ben's legal fees. Peter also gets his Spider-Man suit courtesy of the wrestling organization, although it is not finished yet. Peter does not reveal this secret double-life to anybody, not even his friends Mary Jane Watson and Harry Osborn. Peter flees the wrestling organization after being accused of stealing. Peter returns home where his aunt and uncle berate him for his failing academic grades and for his change in attitude. Angry and confused, Peter runs away and spends the night at Kong's home before going to party, where Ben finds him and tries to take him home. Ben informs Peter of the "with great power, comes great responsibility" ethos that Peter's father abided by. Peter is angered that his father was never there to tell him that himself, and runs off to contemplate Ben's words. More angry and tired, he allows a burglar to escape after robbing a deli owner, but upon returning home, he finds that Uncle Ben had been murdered. Peter tracks down Ben's killer, subdues him, only to find out he is the same burglar he had let get away earlier. He ties him to a rope and leaves the killer to the police. Understanding Uncle Ben's words, Peter is galvanized to using his powers for good, and begins to establish himself as the superhero known as Spider-Man.

Meanwhile, Norman Osborn injects himself with the OZ formula, gaining confidence by tracking the effects the spider formula had on Peter. As a result, Norman is transformed into a monstrous goblin-like creature. The Goblin destroys the lab, kills several scientists and leaves Dr. Otto Octavius, another scientist, for dead. All this is seen by Harry Osborn who runs home to find his mother dead and his house in flames, noticing his father's goblin form leaving the scene. Peter, having now invented web-shooters for his alter-ego, Spider-Man, goes back to school to find the Goblin destroying it. After a small skirmish in the school, Spider-Man leads the Goblin to the Brooklyn Bridge, where the NYPD confront him. The Goblin is shot off the bridge, falling into the East River, assumed dead. The NYPD also turn on Spider-Man who retreats. Peter goes back to the school, using the excuse that he had been stuck under a chalkboard. Harry is sent elsewhere by the authorities, later revealed to be S.H.I.E.L.D., to presumably relatives of his family.

- First appearances: Peter Parker/Spider-Man, Mary Jane Watson, Uncle Ben, May Parker, Flash Thompson, Kenny McFarlane, Liz Allan, Norman Osborn/Goblin, Harry Osborn, Otto Octavius, Captain Stacy, J. Jonah Jameson, Robbie Robertson, Betty Brant, Ben Urich
- Deaths: Uncle Ben

=== "Learning Curve" (#8–13) ===
- Published: June 2001 – November 2001
- Creative Team: Bendis / Bagley
- Plot outline: Peter takes a few photographs of Spider-Man to help Aunt May's financial woes. Peter shows the photographs to Daily Bugle editor J. Jonah Jameson, who gives him the minimum pay. Peter then fixes an internet problem which encourages Jameson to offer Peter a part-time job as a computer technician. Peter uses the Bugle's website to locate who the criminal that shot uncle Ben had been working for. He finds that he is part of a larger criminal organization that is led by Wilson Fisk, The Kingpin. He then finds a criminal group called the Enforcers who also work for the Kingpin. Spider-Man tracks and defeats the Enforcers which forces Mr. Big to tell Spider-Man about Fisk's important gala the next night. The FBI interrupt and Spider-Man barely manages to escape. The next day, Mary Jane asks Peter on a Friday date. Peter moves it to Saturday instead. That Friday, Spider-Man goes to Fisk's penthouse but trips the alarm and is overpowered by Fisk and subdued by Electro. Spider-Man is then unmasked by Fisk who, realising Spider-Man is just a boy, throws Peter's unconscious form through a window but opts to keep Spider-Man's mask. Peter survives the fall but is badly injured, cancelling his date with Mary Jane, who becomes angered by this.

Later, Fisk murders Mr. Big after discovering he had sold him out to Spider-Man. Fisk pulls Spider-Man's mask over Mr. Big and crushes his skull. The body is discovered and the news report that Spider-Man is a murder suspect. At school, Peter creates a false e-mail and through it, discovers Fisk's security system has CCTV footage on CDs. Spider-Man quickly invades the penthouse again and bags as many CDs as possible. After a skirmish with the Enforcers, Electro and Fisk, Spider-Man escapes victorious and gives the CDs (apart from his unmasking) to Ben Urich, a reporter for the Daily Bugle. The published story forces Fisk to leave the country. Peter then reveals to Mary Jane that he is Spider-Man and the two become a couple.

- First appearances: Kingpin, Enforcers, Patsy Walker, Electro, Shocker
- Deaths: Mr. Big / Frederick Foswell

=== "Double Trouble" (#14–21) ===
- Published: December 2001 – June 2002
- Creative Team: Bendis / Bagley
- Plot outline: Peter Parker's teacher offers an assignment where you have to dress up and be a superhero which divides the class. Peter defends his alter-ego which tips Kong off that Peter is Spider-Man. To disprove this theory, Peter allows Kong to kick him and becomes emotional; Kong is ridiculed for believing his theory. New girl Gwen Stacy earns a school suspension when she threatens Kong with a knife over his bullying. Meanwhile, Doctor Octavius, attached to his metal arms, violently escapes S.H.I.E.L.D. custody after having forgotten what exactly happened prior to the incident at the laboratories. Octavius blames Justin Hammer, whom he had worked for while spying on Osborn Industries. Elsewhere, Kraven the Hunter, an Australian television reality show star, promises to kill Spider-Man for his next show. Spider-Man attempts to clear his name of villainy by going to Justin Hammer's nuclear power facility which is being attacked by Octavius. Despite stopping Octavius, Spider-Man is badly injured. Kraven the Hunter visits Peter's school to track the webslinger's scent.

Later that night, Spider-Man approaches Hammer informing him he was trying to save Hammer's life. Hammer attempts to recruit Spider-Man but is turned down, however Spider-Man does follow Hammer's limo to a press conference hosted by Octavius, now dubbed Doctor Octopus. Octavius throws the limo, killing Hammer. Spider-Man manages to defeat Octavius and also protect the press from the fighting. Kraven arrives and attacks Spider-Man who simply knocks Kraven out with one punch. Spider-Man gives a short interview before heading back to Queens. He arrives late and his aunt grounds him for being out too late and lying about his whereabouts. Meanwhile, back in S.H.I.E.L.D. custody, Octavius figures out Peter Parker is Spider-Man after recovering from his amnesia.

- First appearances: Gwen Stacy, Kraven the Hunter, Justin Hammer, Sharon Carter, Doctor Octopus, Sandman, Nick Fury
- Deaths: Justin Hammer

=== "Legacy" (#22–27) ===
- Published: July 2002 – November 2002
- Creative Team: Bendis / Bagley
- Plot outline: At school, Peter reveals to Mary Jane that his aunt has grounded him before they reunite with Harry Osborn, who has recovered from the "Power and Responsibility" arc. Aunt May allows a reluctant Peter to go to Harry's where he meets Norman Osborn, who demonstrates his Goblin form after injecting OZ. Norman claims Spider-Man is part of his legacy because the spider was part of his work, therefore Spider-Man will do what Norman desires otherwise Aunt May and Mary Jane die. A shaken Peter returns home but Gwen Stacy turns up needing a place to stay, which the Parkers allow. At school the next day, Parker is covertly introduced to S.H.I.E.L.D. chief Nick Fury. Fury advises Peter to turn down Norman's offer and promises Peter they will capture Norman when he commits a crime as the Goblin. Grudgingly trusting them, Spider-Man confronts Norman telling him he will never work for him. The Goblin captures Mary Jane, dropping her off Manhattan Bridge. Spider-Man leaps after her, just managing to save her life. After ensuring Mary Jane is safely transported away, a rage-fuelled Spider-Man severely beats the Goblin but S.H.I.E.L.D. gunships interrupt. Goblin returns to his apartment, consuming more OZ formula. Spider-Man battles the Goblin but the Goblin overpowers and begins choking an unmasked Spider-Man. A watching Harry Osborn impales the Goblin, knowing it's his father, with a piece of debris. S.H.I.E.L.D. airships then shoot the Goblin to the brink of death. Peter reveals he is Spider-Man which causes Harry to faint. Fury reveals Harry was hypnotised to forgive his father. Fury praises Spider-Man for handling Goblin but warns Peter that he will be part of S.H.I.E.L.D. when he turns 18. Spider-Man flies to meet Mary Jane. She expresses her fear of being romantically involved with Peter.

=== "Public Scrutiny" (#28–32) ===
- Published: December 2002 – February 2003
- Creative Team: Bendis / Bagley
- Trade paperback appeared: January 1, 2003
- Plot outline: While at school, Mary Jane alerts Peter to an attack on the city by new villain, Rhino. Peter is distracted by Aunt May and an emotional Gwen Stacy, whose mother has left home. Eventually, Spider-Man arrives on the scene but Iron Man has defeated Rhino first. Peter then discovers through the news that a Spider-Man imposter is turning the city against the real Spider-Man. When Peter discovers the imposter is robbing a nearby bank, he arrives as Spider-Man but is shot at by police and wounded, who mistakenly believe him as the criminal. Spider-Man barely escapes arrest and collapses in a deserted alleyway. He rings Mary Jane where they change him out of his Spider-Man costume and get him to a hospital. There he receives overnight treatment and coupled with his accelerated healing factor, recovers in a few hours and flees.

The next day at school, Peter gets further medical attention by S.H.I.E.L.D. operative Wasp. Meanwhile, in Atlantic City, the imposter attempts to steal money from an armored vehicle but is interrupted by Captain Stacy who is killed protecting the public. Gwen is distraught when she hears the news and blames Spider-Man, despite Peter and Mary Jane saying it was an imposter. Aunt May allows Gwen to stay at the Parker's after Gwen's mother refuses to take her. Peter discovers the imposter is robbing another bank and goes there as the real Spider-Man. He brutally beats the imposter, revealed to be a teenage boy. Spider-Man webs him up for the authorities, leaving a note saying "Courtesy of the REAL Spider-Man." At school, Mary Jane reveals she cannot be with Peter while he is Spider-Man stating she is scared and still suffers from the incident when the Goblin threw her off a bridge. A distraught Peter accepts the break-up.

- First appearances: Rhino, Iron Man, Jean DeWolff, Wasp
- Deaths: Captain John Stacy

=== "Venom" (#33–39) ===
- Published: February 2003 – June 2003
- Creative Team: Bendis / Bagley
- Plot outline: Peter discovers scientific work from his late father and watches an old tape of his family and childhood friend, Eddie Brock Jr. who Peter later contacts. Eddie is a college student and shows Peter a black substance called "The Suit" that their fathers had worked on before their corporation cancelled their project. Peter discovers through his father's tapes that his father was close to a medical breakthrough with "The Suit". Peter introduces Gwen to Eddie and the two go on a date. In the meantime, Peter sneaks into the lab and gets some of the substance on his skin. "The Suit" consumes Peter turning him into the black suited Spider-Man. Spider-Man easily defeats several foes but is driven to psychosis and almost kills a burglar. Peter survives the separation from "The Suit" and returns to the lab to destroy the rest.

An angry Eddie, turned down by Gwen, sees Peter at the lab who reveals he is Spider-Man. Peter explains "The Suit" has to be destroyed because of its danger. Eddie seemingly accepts Peter's decision, but he has his own vial of "The Suit" and uses it to transform himself into the aggressive Venom. That night, Peter visits Mary Jane and reveals he misses her and still loves her. However, Mary Jane is hesitant to get back with Peter because his life is too dangerous. The next day, Peter battles Venom who reveals himself as Eddie Brock. Venom is electrocuted during a fight with Peter and police, but there is no sign of Eddie's corpse. Peter begs Nick Fury to take his powers away, but Fury tells Peter to relax, that he doesn't have to be Spider-Man every day. Peter learns from Doc Connors that all the suit research and materials are gone, signalling Eddie may still be alive.

- First appearances: Eddie Brock Jr./Venom, Dr. Curt Connors/Lizard

Note: The arc would later receive a non-canon continuation in the 2005 Ultimate Spider-Man game.

=== "Irresponsible" (#40–45) ===
- Published: July 2003 – November 2003
- Creative Team: Bendis / Bagley
- Plot outline: Gwen persuades Peter to attend a party but end up not having any fun. After seeing Mary Jane there, Peter and Gwen decide to leave, and see Geldoff in the back yard, a fellow party-goer and foreign exchange student who possesses psionic powers and is blowing up cars. The police interrupt the party forcing the students to flee. Peter and Mary Jane reconnect on the journey home culminating in Mary Jane giving Peter a letter which reveals she still loves him. Peter reconciles at Mary Jane's and they agree to give their relationship a second try. The next day, Peter is forced to go to Geldoff's school where he is blowing up cars again. Mary Jane urges Peter to go and gives him a half-completed costume. Spider-Man apprehends Geldoff and takes him to a rooftop away from the police where he lectures Geldoff about responsibility. They argue which ends with Geldoff threatening to blow up Spider-Man but Jean Grey, Storm and Kitty Pryde from the X-Men arrive and take Geldoff and Spider-Man (as a guest) back to X-Mansion. However, Geldoff regains consciousness on board the jet and blows the jet apart. Jean saves the unconscious Geldoff and Spider-Man. Peter awakens at the X-Mansion unmasked but alive. Xavier informs Peter that Geldoff is a result of a genetic experiment when he was in the womb of his mother. Peter returns home late and is confronted by an angry Aunt May. At a later therapy session, May reveals she confronted Peter but stopped when she saw a book from his late mother fall out of his bag, believing he read it away from school. May then reveals in her therapy session that she is too hard on Peter and that she loved Captain Stacy. May's therapist persuades May she is a decent human and encourages her to spend more time with Peter, which she does later to Peter's delight.
- First appearances: Geldoff

=== "Cats & Kings" (#46–53) ===
- Published: November 2003 – April 2004
- Creative Team: Bendis / Bagley
- Plot outline I: Having bought a formidable defence team, Fisk manages to avert the murder charge from the "Learning Curve" story-arc and returns to New York. In a bid to destroy Spider-Man, who continues meddling in his plans, he financially supports his friend Sam Bullit, who is campaigning for District Attorney on an anti-Spider-Man platform. J. Jonah Jameson, editor of the Daily Bugle, emphatically supports Bullit and steps up the paper's negative Spider-Man coverage. Peter is fired at the Bugle for speaking out against this change of strategy. Ben Urich, reporter at the Bugle, questions Bullit about his campaign and quizzes Bullit on his close links to Fisk. Bullit threatens Urich and smashes the tape recorder. However, Urich has a second recorder and informs Jameson and Robertson about Bullit's conduct. Aunt May then angrily rebukes Jameson over the phone regarding Peter's unfair dismissal. These situations inspire Jameson to turn his coverage against Bullit and print Urich's story and run an editorial highlighting Bullit's link to crime. However, the Enforcers confront Jameson that night and attempt to force him to print a retraction but Spider-Man intervenes and defeats two Enforcers, saving Jameson. Later that night, Peter walks back home and sees Jameson on the doorstep. The editor explains he has unresolved grief following his son's death in an Apollo space shuttle mission a year ago. He gives Peter his job back.
- Plot outline II: The Black Cat steals a mysterious tablet but is almost apprehended by Spider-Man. She subdues the webslinger but piques his interest. At the Parker household, Mary Jane and Peter discuss their future but Mary Jane's father Craig confronts the couple about Mary Jane's diary which alludes to when the Goblin threw Mary Jane off the bridge. Peter is unable to give an answer and is consequently banned from seeing a grounded Mary Jane. Mr. Dini arranges for Elektra to track down the missing tablet, property of Wilson Fisk. Peter then discovers an ad from the Black Cat asking Spider-Man to meet her on a rooftop, which he duly does. There Elektra attacks the duo. During their battle, the Black Cat reveals she "is not like her father". Elektra disposes of Spider-Man who manages to get back to the rooftop but discovers both ladies are gone. Meanwhile, Aunt May is woken by Mary Jane's mother who is in panic because Mary Jane has run from home. She tells Peter and Gwen who visit the Watsons and whilst there, Peter deduces Mary Jane is at an old warehouse she stayed after the Goblin attack. Peter consoles her regarding her frustration with her psychologically abusive father. Spider-Man tracks down the Black Cat to her apartment, discovering her father was a famed thief arrested and killed under Fisk's orders. Spider-Man distracts Fisk and Elektra from Black Cat so she can dispose of the tablet. Elektra stabs the Black Cat who falls off the rooftop. Spider-Man cannot find her body. Later that night, Fisk is at home by his wife's hospital bed, vowing to find a way to cure her of her unknown illness.
- First appearances: Black Cat, Vanessa Fisk

=== "Hollywood" (#54–59) ===
- Published: May 2004 – July 2004
- Creative Team: Bendis / Bagley
- Plot outline: Aunt May leaves the house for a trip away as Peter discovers there will be an official Spider-Man movie coming out which angers Peter to the point of interrupting the film set. Meanwhile, Dr. Octavius telepathically communicates with his metal arms and orchestrates a prison break-out. Octavius interrupts the film set to kill his ex-wife Rosalita who is a consultant on the film. Spider-Man fights Octavius, protecting the film crew. As they battle, Mary Jane comes to the Parker house and meets Gwen, she happily reveals her mom kicked her dad out and therefore she is no longer grounded and can see Peter. However, she watches the news and witnesses Octavius beating Spider-Man. Mary Jane makes her excuses. Gwen grows suspicious and discovers a spare Spider-Man outfit in Peter's basement. Octavius knocks Spider-Man out, avoids S.H.I.E.L.D. agents and tortures Spider-Man on a plane flying to Brazil. Spider-Man feigns unconsciousness to brutally attack Octavius when they land in Brazil. Leaving him to S.H.I.E.L.D., Spider-Man stows away on a plane back to America but when he arrives back home, Gwen confronts him with a gun about him being Spider-Man and killing her father. Peter manages to convince Gwen that he did not kill her father and barely manages to change in time to meet Aunt May. Peter and Mary Jane meet with Gwen later who fully accepts Peter was not responsible for her father's death and agrees to keep his Spider-Man identity a secret. Octavius is sent back to S.H.I.E.L.D. headquarters where Nick Fury burns a highly sedated Octavius's metal arms in front of him.

Note: The timing of the comic coincided with the release of Spider-Man 2. Producer Avi Arad, director Sam Raimi, and actor Tobey Maguire all make cameo appearances. Mysterio makes a cameo appearance as a 'villain' in the film, but he looks like the Earth-616 version of Mysterio and has no relationship to the Ultimate version of Mysterio.

=== "Carnage" (#60–65) ===
- Published: August 2004 – November 2004
- Creative Team: Bendis / Bagley
- Plot outline: Spider-Man saves a museum of hostages from Gladiator who Spider-Man defeats in combat but suffers an injury which is treated by Dr. Connors, who is aware of Peter's secret identity. He retains a sample of Peter's blood and after studying it, asks Peter if he can continue testing and researching the DNA sample for potential medical breakthroughs. Peter agrees and Connors enlists young scientist Ben Reilly to aid him. However, one of the experiments, Carnage, begins to form humanoid features and escapes the lab. It goes on a murder spree culminating in the death of Gwen Stacy after Carnage gains Peter's memories through their shared DNA. Aunt May discovers Gwen's corpse and alerts Peter and the police. Distraught, Peter blames himself and when he finds Connors outside his house later that night, Peter assumes Connors's Lizard alter-ego was responsible. Connors explains that Carnage was a result of both his and Peter's DNA spliced together using Peter's father's notes. Carnage reveals itself and attacks Peter; eventually Peter defeats Carnage which had taken on the form of Peter's father. Connors turns himself over to the police for his involvement in Carnage's creation and the college Dean fires him and Reilly for their involvement. Reilly takes a blood sample from Parker before he leaves. At a detention, Mary Jane discovers Flash liked Gwen and Peter, insistent he will quit as Spider-Man, prevents a mugging despite his reservations.
- Deaths: Gwen Stacy (Recanted)
- First appearances: Carnage, Gladiator (Melvin Potter), Ben Reilly, Boomerang

=== "Superstars" (#66–71) ===
- Published: December 2004 – March 2005
- Creative Team: Bendis / Bagley
- Plot outline: Three short stories; 1) Wolverine and Peter mysteriously wake up in each other's bodies; 2) Johnny Storm from the Ultimate Fantastic Four enters Peter's school; 3) Peter has an encounter with Dr. Strange in which he gets mixed up in a spell and is plunged into a horrific world based on his nightmares.
- First appearances: Nightmare, Deathlok
- Notes: Brian Michael Bendis appears at the beginning of both parts of the Wolverine and Peter Parker story, denouncing it as the idea of a younger editor and claiming 'Even I couldn't milk more than two issues out of this one.'

=== "Hobgoblin" (#72–78) ===
- Published: April 2005 – July 2005
- Creative Team: Bendis / Bagley
- Plot outline: Harry Osborn returns to Queens from S.H.I.E.L.D. custody where it is revealed he was dating Mary Jane before his father turned into the Goblin. Nick Fury reveals Harry has inherited his parents' wealth. Harry meets with an old associate of Norman Osborn called Shaw who reveals Harry's suppressed memories concerning his father and Peter's identity as Spider-Man. Harry meets Peter at the Parker household and reveals he knows Peter is Spider-Man and accuses him of stealing Mary Jane. The next day, Peter confronts Mary Jane about this revelation which leads to a major argument. Harry lies to Mary Jane that Peter killed his father which she then tells Peter, believing this is the reason he is acting weird. Peter denies this and seriously injures a robber. Despite preventing the crime, he believes he is losing his discipline. As a result, he seeks out Harry who transforms into the Hobgoblin, having been exposed to the OZ formula when Norman underwent his transformation. Shaw turns out to be Harry's hallucination and orders him to attack Spider-Man. The two engage in a battle and Mary Jane arrives. Spider-Man saves her and battles Hobgoblin which alerts Fury who brings along a Hulkbuster unit which subdues the Hobgoblin. Spider-Man berates Fury for not discovering Harry's power and hits the S.H.I.E.L.D. chief. As a result, Fury prepares plans to de-power Spider-Man. Peter returns home where Mary Jane is. There, Peter reveals he cannot trust Mary Jane and that his superhero life will always endanger her, therefore he breaks up with her, to Mary Jane's horror. Mary Jane attempts to cope with her break-up which results in Flash and Liz setting her up with Mark Raxton, a guitarist in a punk band. She sees his gig that night and gets a lift home with him where they share a kiss. However, Mary Jane regrets it and reveals she is going to try and win Peter back.
- First appearances: Hobgoblin, Killer Shrike

=== "Warriors" (#79–85) ===
- Published: August 2005 – January 2006
- Creative Team: Bendis / Bagley
- Plot outline: Hammerhead moves in on Wilson Fisk's criminal empire as Fisk contends with a looming federal prosecution case. Hammerhead hires the Enforcers and blows up an old Fisk safe-house. Spider-Man visits the crime scene and battles Moon Knight who believes Spider-Man is a criminal. Spider-Man escapes and goes to confront Fisk who has hired Elektra as a bodyguard. Fisk informs Spider-Man of Hammerhead's rise and advises Spider-Man to stop him. Spider-Man goes to Captain Jean De Wolfe who reluctantly agrees Hammerhead is the bigger threat. In Chinatown, Hammerhead and his goons attack martial artists Shang-Chi and Iron Fist. Spider-Man and Black Cat intervene but escape when Hammerhead throws a grenade at them. The Black Cat reveals she did not die during the "Cat and Kings" storyline and attempts to kiss Spider-Man, who nervously makes his excuses and leaves. Fisk murders his Number Two Mr. Dini and promotes Elektra. The next day, Mary Jane asks Peter if they are still friends which Peter confirms but they get into another argument ending with Mary Jane saying that the Spider-Man identity is becoming more important than Peter's. Spider-Man meets Black Cat who goes to Hammerhead's residence where they also meet Elektra, Moon Knight, Shang-Chi, Iron Fist, the Enforcers and Hammerhead. Hammerhead manages to hire Elektra from Kingpin and the Black Cat to his side and they battle the others. Spider-Man is caught in the middle but webs everybody up and calls Captain Wolfe. Everyone cuts through the webbing and Elektra defeats Spider-Man and Hammerhead, throwing them from the window. She stabs the Moon Knight before the Black Cat attacks her. Elektra is defeated when Moon Knight stabs her. The Black Cat admits she was wrong to change sides and makes it up to Spider-Man. She pins him up to a wall and begins to seduce him. Saying she will unmask him and kiss him. The Black Cat unmasks him and sees he's a teenager. Disgusted with herself, she throws up on his crotch and runs away. Captain De Wolfe is revealed to be on Fisk's payroll and she informs him that the Moon Knight is in a coma and Elektra temporarily defected to Hammerhead's side. Peter returns home late again and Aunt May orders him to stop skipping classes or she will kick him out.
- First appearances: Moon Knight, Shang-Chi, Iron Fist
- Notes: According to the letters section of Ultimate Spider-Man #83, this story arc occurs before Ultimate Spider-Man Annual #1.

=== Annual #1 ===
- Published: October 2005
- Creative Team: Bendis / Mark Brooks
- Plot outline: Spider-Man continues to get bad press and his alter-ego Peter is isolated at school. Despite defeating Rhino, Spider-Man is blamed for interrupting the United States Army, which was going to apprehend the villain. At the school cafeteria, Peter sees Mary Jane talking to another boy so Peter leaves. Elsewhere, Kitty Pryde of the X-Men is also feeling lonely and talks to Jean Grey about meeting another boyfriend after her break-up with Bobby Drake. Jean reads her mind and learns Kitty is contemplating ringing up Peter. Jean advises against it but Kitty does so and the two awkwardly arrange to meet up after Peter is finished at school. There they talk about their break-ups with Peter saying he does not feel safe with a girlfriend because she would be vulnerable to danger. Kitty states that a potential girlfriend with superpowers could look after herself but phases through a wall after realising how forward she sounded. She comes back when Peter is about to leave. He agrees with her as the Blackbird jet comes to pick Kitty up. They both admit they like one another and share a kiss. After Kitty is picked up and they exchange e-mail addresses, Peter rushes home to e-mail her only to find Kitty has already sent one.

=== "Silver Sable" (#86–90) ===
- Published: January 2006 – April 2006
- Creative Team: Bendis / Bagley
- Plot outline:Donald Roxxon orders the Silver Sable and her unit to locate and capture Spider-Man for questioning after the webslinger prevents another attack on his company, Roxxon Corporation. Sable's team locate Spider-Man but capture Flash Thompson as opposed to Peter. Realising their mistake, Sable rebukes her unit but Flash manages to escape and goes public with his story, becoming a minor celebrity. Peter meets with new girlfriend Kitty Pryde after school, but ex-girlfriend Mary Jane sees this. As a result of Flash's kidnapping, school security is stepped up. Mary Jane admits she knows Peter and Kitty are seeing one another and angrily storms off. Peter narrowly avoids the police checking his bag (which contains his Spider-Man outfit) for a random security check. As a result, he attempts to bin his costume but cannot bring himself to do it. Likewise, he prepares to confess to Aunt May that he is Spider-Man but stops himself when she reveals her hatred for Spider-Man. Kitty rings Peter to tell him to take the fight to his potential captors. Spider-Man easily defeats Sable and her unit but becomes incapacitated by using the Sable's phone to call the police. Unmasked, Spider-Man comes round at Roxxon Corporation and reveals to Donald he was only saving innocent bystanders and does not know about a plot against his company. Sable scans Spider-Man's finger prints which alert S.H.I.E.L.D. Spider-Man escapes but battles the Vulture, grudgingly saves a falling Roxxon after the Vulture attacks. Spider-Man eventually defeats the Vulture with some help by the Sable. Roxxon receives a threatening phone call which Fury and S.H.I.E.L.D. locate and visit. The culprit is called the Tinkerer, a disgruntled former employee of Roxxon Corporation. He was responsible for making the Vulture's suit and also created the robotic Slayers. S.H.I.E.L.D. claims these inventions as their own and hire the Tinkerer to work for them.
- First appearances: Silver Sable, Wild Pack, Vulture, Tinkerer, Omega Red, Damage Control

=== "Deadpool" (#91–94) ===
- Published: April 2006 – July 2006
- Creative Team: Bendis / Bagley
- Plot outline: Spider-Man and Kitty (disguised as an unnamed alter-ego) battle the Ringer, combining together to defeat him. As Kitty is dating Peter in public, she wears the new costume to protect him from people who could make assumptions if she was to partner Spider-Man in battle. Peter returns home to find Aunt May about to go on a date. Meanwhile, Kitty returns home to the X-Mansion where fake versions of the X-Men incapacitate her. Spider-Man sees the X-Men's jet, Blackbird on auto-pilot so he goes inside where he is led to the X-Mansion. There, he is incapacitated by a fake version of Kitty. It turns out to be Deadpool using his image distortion device, flanked by his team of Reavers, they restrain the X-Men and Spider-Man on a jet and drop them off on the island of Krakoa, where a live television program films Deadpool and his team hunt and kill mutants. Spider-Man regroups with the X-Men and they battle Deadpool and the Reavers. Spider-Man unmasks Deadpool to reveal Professor Charles Xavier, but Spider-Man's "spider sense" reveals it is Deadpool in disguise. The real Xavier is subdued and restrained in the studio, forced to watch his students battle. Eventually the X-Men and Spider-Man defeat Deadpool and his Reavers and release Professor Xavier from captive. They steal a jet and return home. Late in the night, Peter and Kitty go to Peter's house with Peter preparing to reveal to Aunt May that he is Spider-Man. However, May reveals on an answer machine that she decided to stay with her date, Miles Warren, for the night.
- First appearances: Deadpool, Reavers, Ringer, Bonebreaker

=== "Morbius" (#95–96) ===
- Published: July 2006 – August 2006
- Creative Team: Bendis / Bagley
- Plot outline: Set months ago, Spider-Man confronts a vampire but is saved by the vampire hunter Blade. In the present, Peter's love life takes a difficult turn after TV footage of him and Kitty on Krakoa results in the two being unable to see one another in public. Kitty attempts to get Peter to go public with his dual identity, but Peter refuses, putting the relationship under strain. At the Bugle, Ben Urich reveals his latest story about a vampire. J. Jonah Jameson debunks the story, claiming it is false. Peter requests and receives a copy of the report. That night, Urich is seduced by a female vampire who sucks his blood. After Urich is declared missing, Spider-Man visits the flat mentioned in Urich's report where he finds the female vampire, Urich and the vampire Morbius. Unbeknownst to Spider-Man, Morbius is battling female vampire to save Urich, after taking a vow to combat vampirism. However, Spider-Man takes Urich to the hospital where they keep him overnight. Morbius arrives to reverse the condition by biting Urich but Spider-Man thinks Morbius is just going to make the condition worse and battles Morbius. The female vampire turns up and bites Spider-Man. Morbius kills her and Spider-Man allows him to taste his blood. Morbius reveals Spider-Man's blood is genetically different and therefore he is immune to vampirism. Morbius shows Spider-Man a recovering Urich, informing him that his bite negated the earlier bite. At school the next day, Peter reveals his bites to Mary Jane but assures her he is immune to vampirism. He confides in her that he is seeing things someone his age should not.
- First appearances: Morbius, Jennifer Grünwald (named after the Marvel editor of the same name).

=== Annual #2 ===
- Published: October 2006
- Creative Team: Bendis / Mark Brooks
- Plot outline: The Moon Knight recovers from his coma and escapes from police custody which panics police captain Jean De Wolfe, a corrupt official working for Wilson Fisk, the Kingpin. Spider-Man defeats the Shocker and takes him to the police station after a lawyer advises Spider-Man to do so in order to make criminal charges stick. At the station, Spider-Man meets De Wolfe who talks to him in private, tipping Spider-Man off to the whereabouts of a thug named the Kangaroo who is trying to get criminal territory. Spider-Man reluctantly accepts after De Wolfe claims she is powerless to act until they know he is committing a heinous crime. De Wolfe contacts Fisk to let him know she has Spider-Man's trust. That day, Spider-Man arrives to subdue Kangaroo but the Daredevil is there first. Daredevil knew the Kangaroo's whereabouts because he represented the Kangaroo as his lawyer, Matt Murdock. Spider-Man saves Daredevil from the thugs. The two narrowly escape a rocket fired by the Punisher, who escaped out of jail after discovering the Kangaroo is becoming the main criminal underworld boss. Spider-Man battles the Punisher and the Moon Knight who also arrives to continue his idealist crimefighting campaign. Kangaroo begins to escape but Daredevil defeats him. The police arrive and De Wolfe commends Spider-Man on stopping Kangaroo until she is murdered by the Punisher. Angry, Spider-Man brutally beats the Punisher, who claims De Wolfe was corrupt. Daredevil confirms the Punisher is telling the truth, revealing to Spider-Man that she worked for Fisk, which angers Spider-Man even more. That night, Daredevil meets Moon Knight and confides that he wants Fisk dead too. Daredevil reveals he is planning to put a team of like-minded individuals together to bring down Fisk.
- First appearances: Kangaroo

=== "The Clone Saga" (#97–105) ===
- Published: September 2006 – April 2007
- Creative Team: Bendis / Bagley
- Plot outline: Peter is unable to deny he still loves Mary Jane while on the phone to Kitty. He goes to the mall with Mary Jane but it is attacked by the Scorpion. Spider-Man defeats him but unmasking the Scorpion reveals him to in fact be a clone of Peter. Spider-Man visits the Fantastic Four's Baxter building with his clone and unmasks himself to prove he is also Peter Parker. Meanwhile, Mary Jane is kidnapped at the OSCORP building by a disfigured Peter clone, Kaine. Kaine proves to be mentally unstable as he plans to infuse Mary Jane with the OZ formula, in the belief it was enable to defend herself from being hurt again. Before he can do so however, he is attacked by a boy with six arms wearing a black and white spider costume—another clone of Peter known as Tarantula. Tarantula tries to free Mary Jane but gets knocked out by Kaine after a short fight. Kaine then proceeds with the infusion process, which transforms Mary Jane into an angry red beast. Peter attempts to find Mary Jane and goes to the old warehouse where he meets Spider-Woman, a female clone of himself. He returns to his house and finds Gwen Stacy, seemingly alive and well. Aunt May also arrives and is surprised at Gwen's appearance. Peter admits he is Spider-Man and proves it by jumping on the ceiling. At that moment Richard Parker, Peter's father arrives. However, Nick Fury and a squad of Spider Slayers circle the house and order the Parkers and Gwen to surrender. Gwen transforms into Carnage and attacks the Slayers. Fury orders the Spider Slayers to destroy the house. May has a heart attack from the stress forcing an angry Peter to attack Fury before he is subdued. The Fantastic Four arrive and help Peter. Sue takes May to the hospital with Richard while Peter surrenders and Carnage reverts to its Gwen form. However, Spider-Woman arrives and takes Peter to OSCORP, revealing she is an altered clone of Peter and there are more as part of CIA/FBI experimentation. At OSCORP, Peter finds Demogoblin but she powers down when she sees Peter. The Fantastic Four take her to the Baxter building to cure her. Dr. Octavius, accompanied by Fury and the Spider Slayers, reveals he got the OZ and is the father of the clones. Octavius works for the FBI after agreeing to work on their genetic experimentations instead of being imprisoned. He also states Richard Parker is a clone which Sue finds out at the hospital. Peter agrees to surrender to Fury if he allows him ten minutes alone with his clones and Octavius. They target Octavius who reveals he controls metal and Kaine is shot and killed by one of Fury's men and Tarantula is impaled through the heart by a metal pole by Octavius. However, Peter and Jessica defeat Octavius, and Spider-Woman runs away, starting a new life elsewhere. Peter turns himself in but Johnny Storm takes him to the Baxter building where Mary Jane is seemingly cured. Peter admits he still loves Mary Jane and they kiss. Reed Richards informs Peter that he can finally remove his powers if Peter would like him too, but Peter declines the offer. Peter goes to the hospital to check on Aunt May, who mutters he should get a better costume. Peter also learns from Sue that his father's clone has died. Fury meets Peter and explains the Spider Slayers were made to combat Peter in the future because Fury had expected him to snap and become a super-villain due to previous events, but admits he was wrong to think that. Mary Jane returns home and Peter stays at the Watsons while May recuperates. Peter and Mary Jane kiss as a distraught Kitty watches on. At the Avengers HQ, Fury has detained the Scorpion and the Gwen clone. Mary Jane wakes in the middle of the night and imagines Kaine behind her; in reality it is the real Peter who consoles her.
- First appearances: Scorpion, Spider-Woman, Tarantula, Kaine, Spider-Slayers, Demogoblin, Henry Gyrich
- Deaths: Kaine, Tarantula

=== "Ultimate Knights" (#106–110) ===
- Published: May 2007 – August 2007
- Creative Team: Bendis / Bagley
- Plot outline: Mary Jane urges Peter to break up with Kitty, who is revealed to be their new class-mate. At lunch, Peter apologises to Kitty but she calls Peter her worst mistake. Spider-Man meets Daredevil, Shang-Chi, Moon Knight, Doctor Strange and Iron Fist on the rooftop and agrees to be part of the "Ultimate Knights" group but stresses they should not kill Kingpin but ruin him legitimately. Iron Fist tells Fisk about the group's plans in order to protect his family, who Fisk has threatened. Moon Knight creates the Ronin persona and poses as Fisk's bodyguard. This persona becomes dominant and attacks Midtown High School, incapacitates Kitty and knocks out Spider-Man, taking him to Fisk. Fisk concedes Spider-Man is only kept alive because Fisk owns Spider-Man's licensing rights. Fisk lies that Daredevil works for him and beats Ronin to the brink of death, knowing he is Moon Knight. Spider-Man interrupts an Ultimate Knights meeting and accuses Daredevil of being an informer. However, Daredevil refutes this as his heightened senses pin-points Iron Fist as the informer, which he admits. Iron Fist is used to distract Fisk at a later meeting. When Fisk realizes this, he runs to Vanessa's room, only to find an enraged Daredevil, who is holding the comatose Vanessa by her neck, threatening to snap her neck in revenge for what Fisk has done. Spider-Man arrives in time, and pleads and persuades Daredevil to spare Vanessa's life. Daredevil argues that if he doesn't, Fisk will kill the people he cares for, and that it's the only thing that will get Fisk to stand down. Spider-Man agrees, but convinces him not to kill Vanessa, as she is innocent. Daredevil finally relents, but wants Fisk to give up and confess his crimes. Spider-Man, however, reasons that Fisk won't do that, as he would manipulate the law to avoid imprisonment. So Daredevil forces him to take Vanessa and leave the country, permanently. However, Fisk is unwilling to admit defeat and orders the heroes' deaths, and for Midtown High to be blown up while Peter is at school. While attempting to assassinate Moon Knight, Fisk's men seemingly succeed, but Ronin manages to survive through his alter-egos and hands himself in, confessing Fisk ordered the hit. As a result, Fisk is finally brought to justice and arrested.
- First appearances: Jessica Jones, Ronin
- Trivia: This would be Bagley's final arc in his 110-issue run as the penciller for Ultimate Spider-Man.

=== "The Talk" (#111) ===
- Published: September 2007
- Creative Team: Bendis / Bagley / Stuart Immonen
- Plot outline: In a special issue where in Mark Bagley hands over the illustration of Ultimate Spider-Man to Stuart Immonen, Spidey faces the Ultimate Spot and has a talk with Aunt May. Fortunately May agrees with Peter is doing is ultimately good, and therefore supports his decision to be Spider-Man although she is concerned about potential danger she could find herself in. Peter gets May to promise she will not tell anyone about his secret identity.
- First appearances: Spot

=== "Death of a Goblin" (#112–117) ===
- Published: October 2007 – February 2008
- Creative Team: Bendis / Immonen
- Plot outline: After Norman Osborn escapes his incarceration at the Triskelion, he tries to redeem his public image by attempting to convince Spider-Man to tell the world that he was created from the OZ formula that he invented. He teams up with Electro, but Electro is soon defeated by Spider-Man and S.H.I.E.L.D. Carol Danvers kidnapes Peter, unmasks him, and puts him in a cell for questioning, but Peter is saved by Kitty. Danvers decides to use Norman's son, Harry, to draw him out. When Osborn attacks S.H.I.E.L.D., he causes Harry to transform into the Hobgoblin. After a brutal battle, Norman accidentally murders Harry by beating him to death. Osborn, sickened by what he's done, asks to be killed by S.H.I.E.L.D. Danvers gladly complies. In school, Peter gives Harry a eulogy, stating that in the end, he was a hero.
- Deaths: Norman Osborn (presumed, later recanted), Harry Osborn

=== "Spider-Man and His Amazing Friends" (#118–120) ===
- Published: February 2008 – May 2008
- Creative Team: Bendis / Immonen
- Plot outline: When Liz Allen's mutant powers activate, Peter and Bobby Drake attempt to calm her down. Just as they begin to succeed, Magneto arrives, and offers for her to join him. She ultimately decides to join the X-Men, who welcome her with open arms.

=== "Omega Red" (#121) ===
- Published: June 2008
- Creative Team: Bendis / Immonen
- Plot outline: When asked why Peter and Kitty's project was destroyed, Peter explains how Spider-Man and Omega Red attacked the Daily Bugle while he was in possession of the project.
- First appearances: Ned Leeds
- Notes: Omega Red is seen escaping from the Triskelion building in #113 as Norman Osborn also makes his escape.

=== "The Worst Day in Peter Parker's Life" (#122) ===
- Published: July 2008
- Creative Team: Bendis / Immonen
- Plot outline: The Shocker defeats and kidnaps Spider-Man. He unmasks Peter and tortures him while Mary Jane & Kitty Pryde team up and try to save him in time.
- Notes: The Shocker invented many of his devices while working for Roxxon and reveals that the supposed pharmaceutical company is a weapons manufacturer.

=== "War of the Symbiotes" (#123–128) ===
- Published: August 2008 – January 2009
- Creative Team: Bendis / Immonen
- Plot outline: Eddie Brock explains about his alter-ego, "Venom", to random people before eating them. The Beetle appears and eventually fights Spider-Man. Afterwards the Beetle steals a piece of Venom and they get into a fight, and the Venom suit temporarily returns to Spider-Man before being removed by the Ultimates. The Ultimates take the symbiote away while Gwen Stacy escapes and returns to Peter's house. After threatening Peter at school, Eddie shows up at Peter's house and gets into a fight with Spider-Man and Carnage, regrowing the symbiote in the process. Venom turns into even more of a monster when he absorbs the Carnage symbiote and he escapes while a healthy Gwen lives with Peter again. Plus, the Beetle successfully captures and neutralizes Venom and takes him to Latveria.
- First appearances: Adrian Toomes, Beetle
- Notes: This arc is partly based on the Ultimate Spider-Man video game, loosely adapting it into Ultimate Universe canon. It changes or shortens much of the game over the course of several flashbacks, eventually leading up to the present day.

=== Annual #3 ===
- Published: October 2008
- Creative Team: Bendis / David Lafuente
- Plot outline: During a conversation about their lives and the dangers of Peter being Spider-Man, Mary Jane broaches the topic of having sex with Peter but doesn't fully ask him, making him confused. Mary Jane becomes embarrassed and afraid, making her unable to talk to Peter for a while. The next day Peter meets a sympathetic police lieutenant who enlists Spider-Man's aid in finding and arresting a bank robber dubbed "Mysterio". After a failed attempt to capture Mysterio, Peter goes to talk with Mary Jane about her avoiding him and she reveals her worries that he will break up with her because she doesn't want to have sex yet, as Flash Thompson has done so with Liz Allen. Peter reassures her will never pressure her to do it and won't break up with her over it, and that he's fine with waiting. When he professes his love and desire to marry her, the two share a kiss.
- First appearances: Mysterio

=== "Ultimatum" (#129–133) ===
- Published: February 2009 – July 2009
- Creative Team: Bendis / Immonen
- Plot outline: Depicts the events that lead Spider-Man to Ultimatum including the return of Vulture and Spider-Woman. After Peter, MJ, Gwen, Kitty and Kong go for a night on the city, Aunt May is arrested, and taken into a police precinct, for questioning. The Ultimatum wave floods Manhattan, and millions die. While Kitty gets everyone out of the train, into safety, Spider-Man stumbles upon the Hulk. After this, Spider-Man and Hulk save some people from a burning building. Spider-Man sees Daredevil's fist coming out of some rubble and finds that Daredevil is dead. Hulk turns back into Banner (who knew Matt Murdock from the Hulk Murder trial in Ultimates 2) and believes that he has caused the enormous amount of damage to New York. While Spider-Man tries to calm him, he turns back into Hulk and attacks Spider-Man. Meanwhile, MJ, Gwen, Kong, and Kitty make it to the roof of a building and see the destruction. Angry and scared for Peter's life, MJ punches Kitty, deeming her to be responsible for sending Peter out to be Spider-Man, but Kitty responds that he was going to anyway. Exhausted from all that is going on, MJ pleads with Kitty to bring him back, which she agrees to do. During this, J. Jonah Jameson, Robbie Robertson, and Ben Urich survive the wave, with Jameson now shameful of having smeared Spider-Man's name with his newspaper after witnessing him trying to save lives during the attack, marking a change in him to make it up to Spider-Man by writing about what he'd seen. While trying to evade the Hulk, Spider-Man ends up outside of Dr. Strange's house to find that the magical seal to a portal that keeps monsters trapped has been broken, allowing for a swarm of monsters to pour out onto the streets. He is then plunged into a dream by Nightmare, but this stops when Hulk attacks Nightmare, repeatedly punching him. Hulk then causes a huge explosion which Spider-Man is close to. Helicopters chase Hulk away after he begins attacking Spider-Woman who arrives to investigate the explosion. Kitty shows up and helps Spider-Woman searches for Peter. Later, Kitty finds a torn up Spider-Man mask, but no body. She then brings it to Aunt May and MJ who are at Peter's house along with Gwen, Kong, and Mary Jane's mom. The end shows the supporting cast mourning Peter's apparent death.
- Missing: Peter Parker (Believed dead by friends and relatives.)
- Deaths: Daredevil

=== Ultimatum: Spider-Man Requiem #1–2 ===
- Published: August 2009 – September 2009
- Creative Team: Bendis / Immonen / Bagley

The mini-series, Ultimatum: Spider-Man Requiem #1–2 written by Bendis and art by Bagley and Immonen, would explore the lives of supporting cast of the Ultimate Spider-Man after the crisis of Ultimatum as how are they are living their lives without the webslinger, such as J. Jonah Jameson's eulogy to the apparent fallen hero and Peter Parker's loved ones' grief over his disappearance. In Manhattan, the military and the surviving Ultimates searches for survivors of Magneto's attack, and Captain America finds the unconscious Peter Parker within the ruins of the city, revealed to be still alive. The story serves as a bridge between Ultimate Spider-Man and Ultimate Spider-Man vol. 2.

== Ultimate Spider-Man (Vol. 2) ==
=== "The New World According to Peter Parker" (#1–6) ===
- Published: October 2009 – March 2010
- Creative Team: Brian Michael Bendis (writing) / David Lafuente (art)
- Plot outline: Ultimate Comics: Spider-Man begins six months after the events of Ultimatum, and New York City is beginning to recover from Magneto's attack. The Daily Bugle is no longer being published and Peter Parker is now working at Burger Frog, a fast food restaurant. Gwen Stacy has returned to the Parker home after being released by S.H.I.E.L.D. following the events of The Clone Saga. They are revealed to be in a relationship together, after MJ had broken up with Peter not long after Ultimatum, due to her growing fear of losing him one day and the stress of him being Spider-Man. An unidentified vigilante in a red cloak is seen breaking up a robbery before Spider-Man, now revered by much of the city, arrives. Later, an exhausted Johnny Storm arrives at Peter's house and passes out at the front door. Meanwhile, the Kingpin is revealed to be alive and now absolved of his past crimes, due to much of the evidence against him being lost. Mysterio soon appears in the Kingpin's office and proceeds to push him out of a window. As the media reports Wilson Fisk's death as a suicide, Mysterio takes responsibility and enacts a plan to become New York's new crime boss. Kitty Pryde illegally uses her powers at school, and is punished for it. Mary Jane attempts to videotape the incident as evidence of prejudice against mutants. Later, Spider-Man encounters a mother/daughter mutant team whom he fights. At the Parkers' home, Aunt May attempts to get answers out of Johnny Storm when he wakes up. Johnny Storm explains that following the death of his father he no longer feels able to return to the Baxter Building and has been traveling the world in order to avoid the pain. Aunt May helps convince him to speak with his sister and figure out what he wants to do with his life. Mary Jane and Peter's relationship continues to decline, as he is now with Gwen and MJ hints at still having feelings for him. Mysterio releases a hallucinogen in the middle of New York City as a distraction while he attempts to rob the Federal Reserve. Spider-Man confronts him and is hailed as a hero, even though Mysterio escapes. After talking with his sister, Johnny Storm moves into the Parker household with Peter, May, and Gwen. Mary Jane is held at gunpoint and is rescued by an unnamed vigilante in a red cloak, whom she believes is another teenager. Mary Jane tells Peter Parker this, and admits that she regrets breaking up with him, having only done so because of his life as Spider-Man and for almost dying during Ultimatum. Johnny Storm moves into Peter's room and Peter moves into the attic. Later, Mysterio attracts Spider-Man's attention by creating an illusion of the Hulk, and uses this to ambush and defeat him. The vigilante in the red cloak returns to aid Spider-Man in escaping and defeating Mysterio. Spider-Man turns in a piece of Mysterio's costume to the police station. Bobby Drake turns up at Kitty Pryde's house, explaining that he was kicked out of his parents' home. Later, Kitty's mom tells her that her school is thinking of having Kitty expelled for using her powers. Bobby Drake is introduced to Aunt May, who decides to allow him to live with them as well. While at school with Bobby Drake and Johnny Storm, both with new secret identities, Peter is attacked by a Spider-Slayer sent by Mysterio. However the vigilante in the Red Cloak comes to his aid and the robot is destroyed. The cloaked vigilante is revealed to be Kitty Pryde.
- First appearances: The Bombshells
- Deaths: The Kingpin

=== "Crossroad" (#7–8) ===
- Published: February 2010 – March 2010
- Creative Team: Bendis / Takeshi Miyazawa
- Plot outline: Rick Jones is shown to have woken up from a coma that was induced by the Watchers shortly before the events of Ultimatum. Rick's mother believes her son is a mutant, and confides in her neighbor, May Parker. Aunt May then asks Peter, Bobby and Johnny to "suit up" and go talk to Rick. When they confront him he is startled and accidentally uses his powers to teleport himself and Spider-Man to a restaurant in Ann Arbor. They eventually teleport back to New York. Rick claims that he is not a mutant and that he was given his powers by a "floating eye". At this point Johnny Storm, realizing what had happened, tells Rick that he is the herald the Watchers chose. Rick teleports himself and the others to Project Pegasus in Wyoming, where they find the Serpent Squad in the middle of a heist to steal the Serpent Crown. They fight until Wendell Vaughn, the project leader, and S.H.I.E.L.D. Agents arrive to help. After they teleport back home, Rick names himself Nova and leaves in search of his purpose.

=== "Tainted Love" (#9–14) ===
- Published: April 2010 – November 2010
- Creative Team: Bendis / Lafuente
- Plot outline: In Brooklyn, the Bombshells appear and attack a truck full of money. Soon after, Spider-Woman appears and attempts to stop them, but gets overwhelmed. Moments later, the Human Torch shows up and surrounds the thieves in fire, allowing Spider-Woman to take them down. After the police arrive Spider-Woman runs away, and is pursued by the Human Torch, who asks her out on a date. Meanwhile, Peter is pushed into the bathroom by Gwen, where Mary Jane and Kitty Pryde cut his hair as they believe he needs a haircut. A girl from their school walks in on them and tells Kitty that she shouldn't be at the school, due to her being a mutant. At home, Peter finds out that Johnny made out with Spider-Woman and is uncomfortable due her being a female clone of him. The next day, in the middle of class, Kitty is approached by government agents who try to bait her into using her powers so that they can arrest her. Peter tells her to run away as Kong attacks the agents to help her. Not wishing for him to get arrested, Kitty saves Kong by phasing them through the floors of the school, ending up in the sewers before fleeing. At a parent conference in the gym, the principal tries to explain that the situation is also the parents' fault, and that they should be in control of what happens to their children, but the parents are only angered by this and the principal quits his job, declaring that the parents should decide what happens next. Meanwhile, Peter, Bobby, and Johnny decide to go to Kitty's house to try and help her but arrive to find her fighting government agents as the vigilante known as Shroud, who begins to believe that Magneto was right. Although they try to help her, she attacks them as well, before retreating to the sewers and running away with Kong. Meanwhile, Mary Jane reveals to her friend Jessica that she caught Kitty Pryde's escape from the government on tape. Aunt May tells Peter, Bobby, and Johnny that they should stop being super heroes until everything settles down. After the talk, Bobby mentions that he needs a job, and Peter helps him get hired at Burger Frog. At a lunch break, Mary Jane reveal that she has a video of Kitty escaping the police, and they take it to the new Daily Bugle Online. After showing the video to Ben Urich, he says that they should report it but should not show the video due to the growing tensions. Peter's spider sense then goes off and realizes that the source is 'Mr. Jameson', who he follows. However, 'Jameson' attacks and knocks him, revealing that he is a supervillain known as the Chameleon (the Ultimate version of the character). Taking Peter's appearance, Chameleon goes to meet with Mary Jane for the meeting with Ben Urich. On the way home, Chameleon tries to make out with Mary Jane in a taxi, using her feelings for Peter against her. Angry and confused, she leaves him, while Peter tells the driver to continue to Queens, having learned everything about Peter from his wallet. After arriving at the house, he kills the driver and disposes of the body before going inside, where he meets Gwen, who makes out with him. Later at school, Chameleon makes out with Mary Jane in front of Johnny, Bobby, and Gwen, who storms off in anger and heartbreak. When Chameleon arrives at Peter's home, he gets yelled at by Aunt May, having learned everything from Gwen. In the middle of May's lecture, he walks upstairs and after she mentions they should put their 'costumes' away to not cause trouble, he quickly discovers the Spider-Man outfit. He calls an unknown person on the phone, saying they hit the 'jackpot'. The Chameleon puts on the Spider-Man outfit, and begins a giant crime spree, causing chaos everywhere. Meanwhile, the real Peter Parker finds himself tied up with J. Jonah Jameson, who questions why Peter is being held hostage with him as well and quickly deduces his identity as Spider-Man. Meanwhile, Chameleon continues to wreak havoc in New York and calls his partner to get information out of Parker and kill Jameson, believing he is no longer valuable. The partner is revealed to be a female Chameleon, who shoots Jameson in the head and threatens to do the same to Peter if he doesn't tell her what she wants to know. Meanwhile, Aunt May quickly deduces that the Peter they have been interacting with is an imposter, and orders Johnny and Bobby to suit up to go stop the imposter from doing more harm and to find Peter before it's too late. The Human Torch and Iceman corner the imposter Spider-Man while he is trying to steal money from an armored car. After failing to convince the heroes that he is the real Peter, he is defeated and forced to retreat back to the hideout, unintentionally leading them to Peter's location. Ice Man freezes the two Chameleons in ice blocks, and Peter is saved. The authorities later arrive to arrest the Chameleons and find that Jonah is barely alive, rushing him to the hospital. Afterward, Peter arrives home and is welcomed by Aunt May, Bobby, and Johnny, but finds that Gwen now resents him for what has happened. S.H.I.E.L.D. takes full custody of the Chameleons, and J. Jonah Jameson lies in a hospital bed, mumbling "Parker" to himself, revealing that he still remembers who Peter really is.
- First appearances: Chameleon, Camellia

=== "Heartbreak City" (#15) ===
- Published: December 2010
- Creative Team: Bendis / Sara Pichelli
- Plot outline: At the S.H.I.E.L.D. Triskelion, Carol Danvers tells Peter that he should stop being Spider-Man for a while after all he's been through. After arriving home, Aunt May agrees with Danvers for him to take a break and urges him to talk to Gwen, who still resents him. She also pleads with him not punish himself, arguing that it wasn't his fault and that he's been punishing himself enough. Meanwhile, at school, Gwen finally talks with Mary Jane after a few failed attempts and apologizes, believing she forced Peter to be her boyfriend, and reveals that she knew Mary still loved him when they started dating. Unable to face or forgive Peter what has happened, Gwen admits that Mary is the better girl for him, as she understands his life as Spider-Man and can handle the hardships better than she can, although Mary disagrees seeing as she broke up with Peter due to her fear of losing him. Gwen reveals that she plans to break-up with Peter before leaving. At the hospital, J. Jonah Jameson reveals to Ben Urich and Robbie Robertson that he knows who Spider-Man is, but refuses to reveal his identity to anyone, even then. They argue that he should, but Jameson swears he will protect his identity for as long as he lives. A new transfer student named Lana Baumgartner arrives at Peter's school, and Peter finds out that she is the daughter of the Bombshells, having been allowed to return to society due to her age. Although he reveals this to her (without revealing his identity as Spider-Man), he promises to keep her secret in order to give her a chance at a normal life. Peter meets with Mary Jane, and the two admit to their feelings for one another, but Mary tells him to talk with Gwen first, believing Gwen deserves to break up with him before anything happens between them. However, Gwen runs away due to her trauma before Peter gets his chance to talk to her, leaving Aunt May, Bobby, and Johnny behind as well.

== Ultimate Spider-Man (original numbering) ==
=== "Spidey's 50th Anniversary Special" (#150) ===
- Published: January 2011
- Creative Team: Bendis / Lafuente / Pichelli
- Plot outline: In New York City, Spider-Man faces off against the Ringer. After a brief battle, Spider-Man beats the Ringer and is booed away by the civilians watching him. Meanwhile, at the Triskelion, Carol Danvers talks to Steve Rogers, Tony Stark, and Thor. They discuss what to do with Spider-Man. Tony says that the boy should be trained to be a better hero, Steve says that Spider-Man should be grounded, and Thor believes he should be rewarded. Carol then gets an idea. At Peter's house, after Carol Danvers and Aunt May have talked, she reveals to Peter that after school he will begin superhero training.

=== "Super Hero School" (#151–154) ===
- Published: February 2011 – April 2011
- Creative Team: Bendis / Lafuente / Pichelli
- Plot outline: Gwen Stacy returns to the Parker household after some time to cope, and apologizes to Aunt May, who is both upset with her and happy to see her back. Peter gets his chance to speak with her about their relationship, and Gwen admits that she still loves him and wants to get back together with him but knows that she cannot be with him due to his greater feelings for MJ. She apologizes for resenting him for what has happened, understanding that it wasn't his fault, and says that it will take time to get over her feelings for him but vows to be his loyal friend. Elsewhere, the Black Cat steals the Zodiac Key, a powerful relic that was discovered by the late Wilson Fisk, prompting a visit from Mysterio. Felicia is at first hesitant to relinquish control of the key, but upon seeing its destructive power, gives it him. The power of the key is unleashed on New York City, forcing Peter and Tony Stark to battle Mysterio for control of the key. However, this Mysterio is revealed to be a robot powered by high-tech virtual reality. Stark takes the Zodiac key and leaves the clean-up duties to Peter and Felicia.

=== "Happy Birthday, Peter Parker!" (#155) ===
- Published: May 2011
- Creative Team: Bendis / Chris Samnee
- Plot outline: On the day of Peter's birthday, he receives a call from Jonah Jameson, and arrives at the Daily Bugle to find he has his job back plus a full college tuition, a reward from Jameson for saving his life. Meeting up with Kitty Pryde, who has returned to the community, and catches up with her about what has happened since he last saw her (who reveals that Kong had returned to his family and moved away) as the two walk to his home, where they find a birthday party being thrown for him. Seeing Mary Jane, he goes to talk with her and gives him a gift from Tony Stark, which turns out to be upgraded web-shooters. Believing that Peter is back with Kitty, MJ tries to support him but he reaffirms to her that they are not together, even going as far to tell MJ that it is she who he loves. The two kiss, officially reuniting as a couple.

=== "Death of Spider-Man" (#156–160) ===
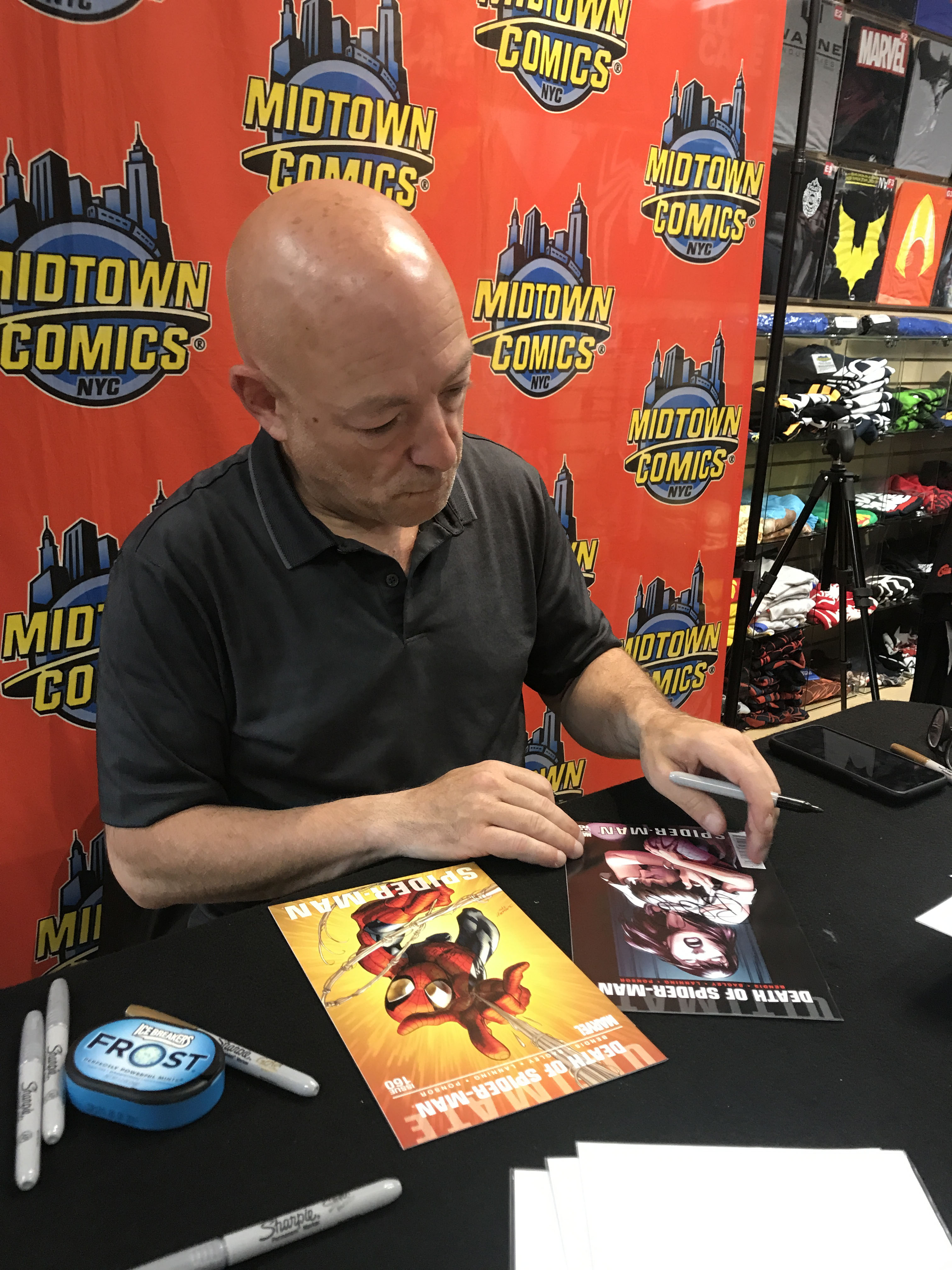
Writer Brian Michael Bendis signing copies of the book featuring the "Death of Spider-Man" storyline during an appearance at Midtown Comics in Manhattan

- Published: May 2011 – August 2011
- Creative Team: Bendis / Mark Bagley
- Plot outline: While out on a date with MJ due to getting back together on his birthday, Peter is approached by Captain America, who has come to retrieve him for his training. At a graveyard, where Cap tries to teach him about life and death, he receives a call from S.H.I.E.L.D. about a situation and leaves, telling Peter to go home for the time being until they continue his training later. Unable to help himself, Peter follows to see what is going on. Norman Osborn, who was thought dead, turns out to be alive, and in S.H.I.E.L.D.'s custody. Despite their belief that Osborn no longer had powers, he is still able to transform into his Goblin form and escape his cell. He then breaks several of Spider-Man's other villains out of their cells: Doctor Octopus, Electro, Sandman, Kraven the Hunter, and Vulture. Calling them "Men of God", Osborn is then able to lead them to freedom. They are then able to make it into New York City and hide out in a building. Though they managed remain undetected by S.H.I.E.L.D., several witnesses report their arrival in the city, one of which was Ben Urich of the Daily Bugle. Osborn kills Doc Ock after he refuses to help take revenge on Spider-Man, which attracts more attention to them. Meanwhile, Spider-Man heads into the conflict between the New Ultimates and the Avengers (as seen in "Avengers Vs. New Ultimates"). While observing the event from a distance, he gets a call from MJ. She tells him that she just found out, through the Daily Bugles website, that Norman Osborn is alive, and has escaped with some of Spider-Man's other enemies. She warns him that Osborn is going to kill him, and he should go back home to protect his family. Peter phones home and tells Aunt May and Gwen to go into hiding, even showing up to inform them of what is happening and to see them off. Peter then goes into New York as Spider-Man and finds Doctor Octopus's body. Seeing an explosion on a bridge, where the Ultimates and the New Ultimates are fighting, Peter goes to investigate and sees The Punisher pointing a gun at Captain America. Spider-Man leaps and pushes Captain America out of the way, taking the bullet in the stomach. Meanwhile, Vulture and the other villains crash the Tinkerers hideout and force him to give them weapons. Kraven then tracks Peters' scent to his house, where the villains encounter Bobby Drake and Johnny Storm, who arrived after Gwen and May had already left, unaware of what is happening. After a brief battle that leaves Bobby and Johnny incapacitated, an injured Spider-Man arrives, the bullet wound in his stomach webbed over and having lost his mask. After quickly dispatching Vulture he challenges the other villains to attack him. The battle soon draws the attention of the entire neighborhood, who soon surround the area, glimpsing Peter without his mask and exposing his identity with their cell phones. Peter is bombarded by assaults from the Vulture, Sandman, and Electro, but before Electro can finish off Peter, he is shot in the chest by a returning May Parker, who returned after a neighbor informed her of the attack. The bullet wound causes Electro to unleash an electrical barrage that neutralizes Vulture and Sandman. The battle appears to be over until Norman Osborn awakens, lunging straight for Peter, Aunt May, and Gwen Stacy. Peter grabs them both and jumps to safety with the Green Goblin following quickly behind. Peter frantically instructs Gwen to not listen to anything Aunt May says and to get her as far away from the battle as possible. Meanwhile, Mary Jane is at home watching the news and trying to get in touch with Peter on the phone. When she sees the sparks in the sky coming from Peter's neighborhood, she tries to leave the house but is stopped by her mother, who refuses to let her leave. Although it is never seen, it is implied that MJ tells her that Peter is Spider-Man. Meanwhile, Peter fights against the Green Goblin but realizes he is too weak to win the fight alone. Peter wakes up a sleeping Johnny Storm from the front lawn, who leaps into battle with Osborn and tries to burn him. Norman, however, absorbs the entirety of Johnny's attack, sending Johnny back down to the Parkers' front lawn. Desperate and faced with a super-powered Goblin, Peter begins to mercilessly beat Osborn with a mail box while verbally berating him, asking what the point of killing Spider-Man would be. Peter quips that killing him won't bring back Harry, nor will it restore his industrial empire, while throwing him into an open fire hydrant. Osborn responds that all he wants is to kill him, which Peter seemingly resigned to the idea of, clenches his side as the Goblin bears down on him, when suddenly a speeding (stolen) van driven by Mary Jane hits the Goblin, momentarily incapacitating him. Peter punches through the windshield to rescue Mary Jane, kisses her, and throws her to safety in a web that he spins. Osborn begins to crawl out from under the van, angry and vowing to destroy Peter's life and family like how his own was. Peter, completely exhausted, lifts up the van and slams it repeatedly down on Norman. Suddenly the van explodes, throwing Peter at the feet of Johnny Storm and his neighbors. Johnny remarks that he thinks Peter got Osborn in the explosion, which Peter is relieved by as he doesn't have the strength to fight anymore. MJ, Gwen and Aunt May all show up simultaneously. Aunt May begins to cry while MJ and Gwen ask where the ambulances are. Peter, in his last breath, says to Aunt May that he couldn't save Uncle Ben but he's satisfied with having saved her, proclaiming that "I did it. I did...", before smiling up at her and taking his final breath as his eyes close. Johnny checks for a pulse as May, Gwen, and MJ looks on in wide-eyed disbelief. His expression confirms their worst fears and they begin to cry, with MJ holding Peter's body in her arms. Amid the screams of anguish and grief, the flaming body of a powered-down Osborn smiles, satisfied that he had finally killed Spider-Man before seemingly dying among the flames. Although not in the story, the front cover of Issue #160 shows Peter possibly walking into the afterlife with Uncle Ben, who praises him: "You did good, kid."
- Deaths: Doctor Octopus, Spider-Man (recanted), Green Goblin (recanted)

== Collected editions ==
Ultimate Spider-Man has been collected in the following collected editions:

#	Title	Material collected	Format	Pages	Released	ISBN
1	Power And Responsibility	Ultimate Spider-Man #1–7	HC	200	8 Apr 2009	978-0785139393
1	Power And Responsibility	Ultimate Spider-Man #1–7	TPB	184	2001	978-0785107866
2	Learning Curve	Ultimate Spider-Man #8–13	TPB	144	2002	978-0785111443
3	Double Trouble	Ultimate Spider-Man #14–21	TPB	176	2002	978-0785108795
4	Legacy	Ultimate Spider-Man #22–27	TPB	160	Dec 2002	978-0785109686
5	Public Scrutiny	Ultimate Spider-Man #28–32	TPB	128	Feb 2003	978-0785110873
6	Venom	Ultimate Spider-Man #33–39	HC	176	2 Jan 2008	978-0785128731
6	Venom	Ultimate Spider-Man #33–39	TPB	168	Aug 2003	978-0785110941
7	Irresponsible	Ultimate Spider-Man #40–45	TPB	144	Nov 2003	978-0785110927
8	Cats & Kings	Ultimate Spider-Man #47–53	TPB	184	May 2004	978-0785112501
9	Ultimate Six	Ultimate Spider-Man #46, Ultimate Six #1–7	TPB	208	Jun 2004	978-0785113126
10	Hollywood	Ultimate Spider-Man #54–59	TPB	144	Jul 2004	978-0785114024
11	Carnage	Ultimate Spider-Man #60–65	TPB	144	17 Nov 2004	978-0785114031
12	Superstars	Ultimate Spider-Man #66–71	TPB	144	6 Apr 2004	978-0785116295
13	Hobgoblin	Ultimate Spider-Man #72–78	TPB	168	10 Aug 2005	978-0785116479
14	Warriors	Ultimate Spider-Man #79–85	TPB	144	11 Jan 2006	978-0785116806
15	Silver Sable	Ultimate Spider-Man #86–90, Annual #1	TPB	160	24 May 2006	978-0785116813
16	Deadpool	Ultimate Spider-Man #91–96, Annual #2	TPB	184	13 Sep 2006	978-0785119272
17	Clone Saga	Ultimate Spider-Man #97–105	HC	288	18 Apr 2007	978-0785126775
17	Clone Saga	Ultimate Spider-Man #97–105	TPB	240	5 Sep 2007	978-0785119289
18	Ultimate Knights	Ultimate Spider-Man #106–111	TPB	144	12 Sep 2007	978-0785121367
19	Death Of A Goblin	Ultimate Spider-Man #112–117	TPB	144	20 Feb 2008	978-0785121374
20	And His Amazing Friends	Ultimate Spider-Man #118–122	TPB	120	3 Sep 2008	978-0785129615
21	War Of The Symbiotes	Ultimate Spider-Man #123–128	TPB	144	11 Feb 2009	978-0785129622
22	Ultimatum	Ultimate Spider-Man #129–133, Annual #3	HC	160	23 Sep 2009	978-0785141242
22	Ultimatum	Ultimate Spider-Man #129–133, Annual #3	TPB	160	27 Jan 2010	978-0785138457
	Ultimatum: Requiem	Ultimatum: Spider-Man: Requiem #1–2	HC	144	14 Oct 2009	978-0785139256
	Ultimatum: Requiem	Ultimatum: Spider-Man: Requiem #1–2	TPB	152	3 Feb 2010	978-0785139256
1	The World According To Peter Parker	Ultimate Spider-Man (vol. 2) #1–6	HC	144	7 Apr 2010	978-0785140115
1	The World According To Peter Parker	Ultimate Spider-Man (vol. 2) #1–6	TPB	144	21 Jul 2010	978-0785140993
2	Chameleons	Ultimate Spider-Man (vol. 2) #7–14	HC	192	29 Sep 2010	978-0785140122
2	Chameleons	Ultimate Spider-Man (vol. 2) #7–14	TPB	192	18 Mar 2011	978-0785141006
3	Death of Spider-Man Prelude	Ultimate Spider-Man (vol. 2) #15, #150–155	HC	168	6 Jul 2011	978-0785146391
3	Death of Spider-Man Prelude	Ultimate Spider-Man (vol. 2) #15, #150–155	TPB	168	4 Jan 2012	978-0785146407
4	Death Of Spider-Man	Ultimate Spider-Man #156–160	HC	128	2 Nov 2011	978-0785152743
4	Death Of Spider-Man	Ultimate Spider-Man #156–160	TPB	128	2 May 2012	978-0785152750
	Death Of Spider-Man Fallout	Ultimate Comics: Fallout #1–6	HC	136	7 Dec 2011	978-0785159124
	Death Of Spider-Man Fallout	Ultimate Comics: Fallout #1–6	TPB	136	6 Jun 2012	978-0785159131

Ultimate Collections
#	Title	Years covered	Issues collected	Pages	Released	ISBN
1	Volume 1	2000–2001	Ultimate Spider-Man #1–13	352	Apr 2007	978-0785124924
2	Volume 2	2001–2002	Ultimate Spider-Man #14–27	344	Apr 2009	978-0785128861
3	Volume 3	2002–2003	Ultimate Spider-Man #½, 28–39	296	Aug 2010	978-0785149194
4	Volume 4	2003–2004	Ultimate Spider-Man #40–45, 47–53	328	Aug 2013	978-0785184379
5	Volume 5	2003–2004	Ultimate Spider-Man #46, 54–59, Ultimate Six #1–7	352	Feb 2015	978-0785192893
6	Volume 6	2004–2005	Ultimate Spider-Man #60–71	296	Apr 2016	978-0785196327
7	Volume 7	2005–2006	Ultimate Spider-Man #72–85	344	Jun 2017	978-1302908744

Ultimate Epic Collections
#	Title	Years covered	Issues collected	Pages	Released	ISBN
1	Learning Curve	2000–2001	Ultimate Spider-Man #1–13	352	18 Mar 2025	978-1302963002

Oversized Hardcovers
#	Years covered	Material collected	Format	Pages	Released	ISBN
1	2000–2001	Ultimate Spider-Man #1–13	OHC	354	18 Aug 2002	978-0785108986
2	2001–2002	Ultimate Spider-Man #14–27	OHC	336	10 Mar 2003	978-0785110613
3	2002–2003	Ultimate Spider-Man #28–39, ½	OHC	304	29 Sep 2003	978-0785111566
4	2003–2004	Ultimate Spider-Man #40–45, 47–53	OHC	336	1 Jul 2004	978-0785112495
5	2003–2004	Ultimate Spider-Man #46, 54–59; Ultimate Six #1–7	OHC	352	24 Nov 2004	978-0785114017
6	2004–2005	Ultimate Spider-Man #60–71	OHC	296	5 Oct 2005	978-0785118411
7	2005–2006	Ultimate Spider-Man #72–85	OHC	344	18 Oct 2006	978-0785121480
8	2006	Ultimate Spider-Man #86–96, Annual #1–2	OHC	344	11 Apr 2007	978-0785126041
9	2006–2007	Ultimate Spider-Man #97–111	OHC	400	27 Feb 2008	978-0785130819
10	2007–2008	Ultimate Spider-Man #112–122	OHC	272	4 Mar 2009	978-0785137764
11	2008–2009	Ultimate Spider-Man #123–133, Annual #3, Ultimatum: Spider-Man Requiem #1–2	OHC	384	22 Jun 2010	978-0785146421
12	2009–2010	Ultimate Spider-Man (vol. 2) #1–14	OHC	352	16 May 2012	978-0785164623
Barnes & Noble Collection	2000–2003	Ultimate Spider-Man #1–39, ½	OHC	992	2004	978-0760761335

Omnibuses
#	Title	Years covered	Material collected	Pages	Released	ISBN
1	Ultimate Spider-Man Vol. 1	2000–2003	Ultimate Spider-Man #1–39, ½	1,000	2 Jun 2012	Joe Quesada cover: 978-0785164753
1	Ultimate Spider-Man Vol. 1	2000–2003	Ultimate Spider-Man #1–39, ½	1,000	2 Jun 2012	Mark Bagley DM cover: 978-0785164982
1	Ultimate Spider-Man Vol. 1	2000–2003	Ultimate Spider-Man #1–39, ½	1,000	4 Jan 2022	Joe Quesada cover: 978-1302931872
1	Ultimate Spider-Man Vol. 1	2000–2003	Ultimate Spider-Man #1–39, ½	1,000	4 Jan 2022	Joe Quesada web DM cover: 978-1302931889
1	Ultimate Spider-Man Vol. 1	2000–2003	Ultimate Spider-Man #1–39, ½	1,000	4 Jan 2022	Mark Bagley Venom DM cover: 978-1302931865
2	Ultimate Spider-Man Vol. 2	2003-2005	Ultimate Spider-Man #40–71, Ultimate Six #1–7	984	17 Jan 2023	Mark Bagley cover: 978-1302947484
2	Ultimate Spider-Man Vol. 2	2003-2005	Ultimate Spider-Man #40–71, Ultimate Six #1–7	984	17 Jan 2023	Mark Bagley Carnage DM cover: 978-1302947484
2	Ultimate Spider-Man Vol. 2	2003-2005	Ultimate Spider-Man #40–71, Ultimate Six #1–7	984	17 Jan 2023	John Cassaday Sinister Six DM cover: 978-1302947491
3	Ultimate Spider-Man Vol. 3	2005-2007	Ultimate Spider-Man #72–111, Annual #1–2	1,088	6 Dec 2023	Mark Bagley cover: 978-1302950194
3	Ultimate Spider-Man Vol. 3	2005-2007	Ultimate Spider-Man #72–111, Annual #1–2	1,088	6 Dec 2023	Mark Bagley Carnage DM cover: 978-1302950323
3	Ultimate Spider-Man Vol. 3	2005-2007	Ultimate Spider-Man #72–111, Annual #1–2	1,088	6 Dec 2023	Mark Bagley Moon Knight DM cover: 978-1302950200
4	Ultimate Spider-Man Vol. 4	2007-2010	Ultimate Spider-Man #112–133, Annual #3, Ultimatum: Spider-Man – Requiem #1–2, Ultimate Spider-Man (vol. 2) #1–15	1,008	27 Aug 2024	Stuart Immonen cover: 978-1302959555
4	Ultimate Spider-Man Vol. 4	2007-2010	Ultimate Spider-Man #112–133, Annual #3, Ultimatum: Spider-Man – Requiem #1–2, Ultimate Spider-Man (vol. 2) #1–15	1,008	27 Aug 2024	Stuart Immonen X-Men DM cover: 978-1302959562
5	Ultimate Spider-Man Vol. 5	2010-2011; 2001-2002	Ultimate Spider-Man (vol. 2) #150–160; Ultimate Comics Fallout #1; Ultimate Marvel Team-Up #1–16; Ultimate Spider-Man Super Special; material from Ultimate Comics Fallout #2, 4, 6	TBC	Nov 2025	David LaFuente cover: TBC
5	Ultimate Spider-Man Vol. 5	2010-2011; 2001-2002	Ultimate Spider-Man (vol. 2) #150–160; Ultimate Comics Fallout #1; Ultimate Marvel Team-Up #1–16; Ultimate Spider-Man Super Special; material from Ultimate Comics Fallout #2, 4, 6	TBC	Nov 2025	Mark Bagley DM cover: TBC
5 (Alt)	Ultimate Comics Spider-Man: Death Of Spider-Man	2010-2011	Ultimate Spider-Man (vol. 2) #15, 150–160; Ultimate Avengers vs. New Ultimates #1–6; Ultimate Comics Fallout #1–6	608	28 Nov 2012	Joe Quesada cover: 978-0785164647
5 (Alt)	Ultimate Comics Spider-Man: Death Of Spider-Man	2010-2011	Ultimate Spider-Man (vol. 2) #15, 150–160; Ultimate Avengers vs. New Ultimates #1–6; Ultimate Comics Fallout #1–6	608	27 Feb 2024	Joe Quesada cover: 978-1302957551
5 (Alt)	Ultimate Comics Spider-Man: Death Of Spider-Man	2010-2011	Ultimate Spider-Man (vol. 2) #15, 150–160; Ultimate Avengers vs. New Ultimates #1–6; Ultimate Comics Fallout #1–6	608	27 Feb 2024	Mark Bagley Sinister Six DM cover: 978-1302957568

== See also ==
- Ultimate Comics: Spider-Man
- List of Ultimate Fantastic Four story arcs
- List of Ultimate X-Men story arcs
