= Spider-Woman (Ultimate Marvel character) =

Superhero

- Textless cover of Ultimate Spider-Man #98 (October 2006). Art by Mark Bagley and Richard Isanove.

Publication information
- Publisher: Marvel Comics
- First appearance: As Spider-Woman: Ultimate Spider-Man #98; (August 2006); As Jessica Reilly Drew: Ultimate Spider-Man #102; (November 2006); As Julia Carpenter: Ultimate Comics: Mystery #2; (August 2010); As Black Widow: All-New Ultimates #1; (April 2014)
- Created by: Brian Michael Bendis (writer); Mark Bagley (artist)

In-story information
- Alter ego: Spider-Woman
- Species: Human mutate (clone)
- Team affiliations: Ultimates; New Ultimates; S.H.I.E.L.D.; Spider-Army/Web-Warriors
- Partnerships: Spider-Man (Peter Parker); Spider-Man (Miles Morales); Kitty Pryde; Human Torch
- Notable aliases: Peter Parker; Jessica Drew; Julia Carpenter; Black Widow; Spider-Girl
- Abilities: Superhuman strength, stamina, speed, durability, agility, and reflexes; Ability to stick to surfaces; Organic webbing; "Spider-sense"

Ultimate Spider-Woman (colloquial: Jessica Drew, Julia Carpenter, Black Widow or Spider-Girl) is a superheroine appearing in American comic books published by Marvel Comics. Created by Brian Michael Bendis and Mark Bagley, she is the Ultimate Marvel equivalent of Ben Reilly and both iterations of Spider-Woman (Jessica Drew and Julia Carpenter). As opposed to her prime counterparts, this character is a female clone of Earth-1610's Peter Parker, dealing with being the brain of a teenage boy trapped in the body of a teenage girl. In 2014 and 2019, the character's red-and-white costume and characterisation as a secret agent relative of Peter Parker were respectively adapted as his Earth-616 sister Teresa Parker and Earth-19529 daughter Claire Parker.

The character received a positive critical reception. In 2023, the character made their cinematic debut in the animated feature film Spider-Man: Across the Spider-Verse as a member of Miguel O'Hara's Spider-Society.

== Publication history ==
Created by Brian Michael Bendis and Mark Bagley, the Ultimate incarnation of Spider-Woman first appeared in Ultimate Spider-Man #98 (October 2006), and appeared in All-New Ultimates #1 (April 2014) as the Ultimate Universe's third equivalent of Black Widow (after Natasha Romanoff and Monica Chang). She is a supporting character in Ultimate Comics: Spider-Man and Ultimate Comics: The Ultimates.

== Fictional character biography ==
=== Clone Saga ===
Spider-Woman is a genetically engineered clone of the original Spider-Man, Peter Parker, whose chromosomes were manipulated to make her biologically female. Created alongside Kaine to act as agents for the CIA (code name: Spider-Woman), she retains Peter's memories and love of Mary Jane Watson, also viewing herself as Peter. The intent of her creators was to erase her memories and implant new ones, but both escaped before the process could be carried out. Doctor Octopus reveals himself as the mastermind behind the experiments that created them. All three fight Doctor Octopus together and eventually prevail. Peter surrenders to Nick Fury while the clones opt to flee. At the storyline's close, Spider-Woman decides to start a new life apart from Peter, takes her leave of him after what she calls "the most awkward hug in history", establishing a sibling-like relationship with him.

=== Ultimatum ===
Spider-Woman later appears during the "Ultimatum" storyline, making their public debut when they help Johnny Storm apprehend the Vulture. Storm begins to develop a romantic interest in Spider-Woman after a bad date with a famed but obnoxious teen singer, unaware that she is Spider-Man's female clone. They later meet May Parker while aiding civilians during Magneto's worldwide attack, taking them to safety and promising to find Peter for them. Later, she travels to the center of Manhattan where Doctor Strange's home is being attacked by Nightmare; the Hulk begins to destroy the portal to the Dark Dimension, causing an explosion. After briefly being chased by Hulk, Spider-Woman continues her search for Peter and meets Kitty Pryde. They work together on the search as well as try to help survivors, but are overwhelmed by the deaths and destruction around them. They manage to find a remnant of Peter's mask, which Kitty takes with her and gives to Mary Jane Watson at Peter's home, informing her and May that Peter is still among the missing.

=== Doomsday ===
In Ultimate Enemy, Spider-Woman is seen doing recon on the Roxxon Corporation, investigating possible illegal genetic experimentation, when the corporation building is attacked. It is assumed that the person behind the attack is the "Ultimate Enemy". She is later attacked by the same creature that destroyed the building. Spider-Woman then attempts to infiltrate Roxxon, posing as an employee. On her first day, she is introduced to the Roxxon Brain Trust. Shortly afterward, she witnesses an attack on the Baxter Building, and Roxxon suggests she move into an underground bunker. While waiting there, Misty Knight starts to ask them questions and figures out that she is not who she claims to be. The Roxxon Brain Trust then reveals that they suspect Roxxon in the attacks. Spider-Woman does not trust them and when they want to see her powers, she webs them up and attempts to flee. One of the Brain Trust members transforms into a brute of some sort and knocks them out before she can get away.

In Ultimate Doom, Spider-Woman awakens to find herself bound on a table and meets the Brain Trust's leader, Doctor Octopus. It doesn't take long for Spider-Man to arrive and save her, just before Roxxon is attacked again. As the duo start rescuing civilians, they notice Doctor Octopus is also in danger. Although Spider-Woman wants to let him die, Spider-Man eventually manages to convince her to help save him. Rick Jones arrives with the Human Torch and they learn that heroes are gathering to take down Reed Richards. Spider-Woman and even Doctor Octopus join the group. During the attack in the Negative Zone, Spider-Woman meets the Ultimates for the first time, and assists Captain America himself. After the confrontation with Richards, Spider-Woman becomes an agent of S.H.I.E.L.D. at Carol Danvers's request.

=== Ultimate Comics: Spider-Man and Ultimate Comics: The Ultimates ===
After Peter apparently dies fighting the Green Goblin, Spider-Woman confronts the new Spider-Man, Miles Morales. She later assists Iron Man and Hawkeye in fighting Electro. Eventually, Spider-Woman becomes frustrated about being in the Ultimates team, being captured along with Captain Britain by the new S.H.I.E.L.D. director Marvin Flumm, but is later released and takes part in Captain America's swearing into the presidency. When Captain America went to join the states once more, Spider-Woman joined the new president and was part of the ground forces. During the "United We Stand" storyline, Spider-Woman is reluctantly teamed with Miles during S.H.I.E.L.D.'s battle with the terrorist group Hydra. After they are separated in the battle, Spider-Woman finds Miles and returns him to New York.

Initially, Spider-Woman is not forthcoming when Miles asks why she cares so much about him. But after Miles quits being Spider-Man following personal tragedy, Spider-Woman reveals to Miles that she is Peter's clone, explaining that although she has Parker's memories, she is not Spider-Man, but feels that Miles should be. This convinces Miles to resume the Spider-Man identity.

=== All-New Ultimates ===
Later, Miles and Spider-Woman team up with Cloak and Dagger and Bombshell to fight Roxxon's Brain Trust and confront Donald Roxxon. Along with Kitty Pryde, the group becomes the New Ultimates, she changes her superhero alias to "Black Widow", and attempts to begin dating Kitty "again" (from when they were Peter). She also fought against Hydra's Spider-Men during which she's dubbed "Spider-Girl".

=== Spider-Verse ===
During the "Spider-Verse" storyline, Spider-Woman teams up with Kaine and an alternate Ben Reilly to investigate the home of the Inheritors and find out how they are able to clone new bodies for themselves.

=== Spider-Men II ===
Following the Secret Wars events that seemingly destroyed Spider-Woman's universe, she is returned to existence, once again using the Spider-Woman identity, and rejoining the Ultimates with the resurrected Peter Parker who has reclaimed the Spider-Man mantle in Miles's absence upon emigrating to Earth-616.

== Powers and abilities ==
Spider-Woman has all the powers of Spider-Man, including superhuman strength, speed, and agility, the ability to stick to surfaces and a spider-sense that warns them of danger. In addition, her fingertips have spinnerets, allowing her to fire silk-spinning webbing from them.

== Other versions ==
=== Teresa Parker ===
On Earth-616, the Ultimate Spider-Woman's iconic red-and-white costume and characterisation as a secret agent "sister" to Peter Parker / Spider-Man would be adapted to the new character of Teresa Parker, the Earth-616 Peter's long-lost younger sister, first appearing The Amazing Spider-Man: Family Business in 2014, before returning in Peter Parker: The Spectacular Spider-Man, The Amazing Spider-Man Volume Five, and The Chameleon Conspiracy.

=== Claire Parker ===
On Earth-19529, the Ultimate Spider-Woman's iconic red-and-white costume and characterisation would be adapted to the new character of Claire Parker, daughter of Spider-Man, as a composite character with Mayday Parker, in Spider-Man: Life Story, adapting the events of all Spider-Man comics released between 1962 and 2019 as if their events had happened in real-time, with some divergences during the Clone Saga. After fending off Morlun in 2006 while Peter is involved in the superhero Civil War, by 2019 Claire has become Spider-Woman with the Ultimate Spider-Woman costume, remaining on Earth to protect her brother Benny and mother Mary Jane as he goes to space face Doctor Doom along with Miles Morales (actually Otto Octavius).

== Reception ==
=== Critical reception ===
Michael Austin of CBR.com stated, "Not only is the mainstream Jessica Drew incredibly cool, but her Ultimate universe counterpart is also an equally impressive character as well. This Jessica Drew is actually a female clone of Peter Parker. The character debuted during the Ultimate Marvel version of the Clone Saga. While the original Clone Saga is hotly debated as possibly one of the worst Spider-Man arcs of all time, the Ultimate universe counterpart was received much better, and it was thanks to great characters like the Ultimate Jessica Drew." Jamie Lovett of ComicBook.com asserted, "The other alternate universe clone that needs honorable mentioning here come's from Marvel's own Ultimate Universe. The ultimate universe Jessica Drew is a female clone of Peter Parker, kind of like how X-23 is a female clone of Wolverine, except that Jessica presents as approximately the same age as Peter. The Ultimate "Clone Saga" is a much better more cohesive story than the original "Clone Saga," and Ultimate Jessica Drew's introduction is part of that. Watching her and Peter Parker try to figure out exactly what's going on when they first meet is a brilliant moment. Jessica Drew eventually joined the Ultimates and took on the persona of the new Black Widow before the Ultimate Universe finally came to its Ultimate End. Weirdly enough, the female clone origin for Ultimate Spider-Woman makes more sense than the origin of the original Marvel Universe Spider-Woman, which had to do with her father saving her life by injecting her with experimental spider-blood, and has no direct connection to Peter Parker at all. This is a great case of the Ultimate Universe doing what it set out to do - modernizing and streamlining classic Marvel Universe characters." Alyssa Gawaran of MovieWeb said, "If the multiverse has taught us anything, there is an endless amount of variants of our favorite superheroes out there. Therefore, you should not be surprised that there is a woman clone of our beloved Peter Parker that is out and about in the Marvel Comics — and she's a lesbian! Jessica Drew, better known as Ultimate Spider-Woman, is a hero found in the All-New Ultimates series for Marvel. She ends up taking on the Black Widow legacy and has her very own 'coming out' moment in All-New Ultimates #4. The Spider-Verse is still expanding, and Jessica Drew would be a very fitting addition."

Ultimate Jessica Drew has been discussed by media outlets and scholars in relation to queer and transgender-coded representation. Jonathan Jones of Screen Rant described the character as Marvel's first LGBTQ+ Spider-Hero, arguing that her origin as a female clone of Peter Parker with his memories gives the character a transgender resonance, although the comics do not explicitly identify her as transgender. The character has also been described as lesbian by PinkNews and MovieWeb, with commentators citing her stated attraction to women in All-New Ultimates #4.

=== Accolades ===
- In 2014, ComicBook.com ranked Jessica Drew's Ultimate Marvel iteration 3rd in their "7 Best Female Characters from the Spider-Man Multiverse" list.
- In 2017, Gizmodo ranked Jessica Drew 9th in their "Greatest Spider-Women of All Time" list.
- In 2017, Screen Rant ranked Jessica Drew 3rd in their "Every Spider-Man Clone" list.
- In 2018, CBR.com ranked Jessica Drew's costume 10th in their "40 Alternate Spider-Man Costumes" list.
- In 2020, CBR.com ranked Jessica Drew 1st in their "Spider-Woman: 10 Most Powerful Characters To Bear The Name" list.
- In 2021, Screen Rant included Jessica Drew in their "Spider-Woman: 10 Best Alternate Versions Of The Marvel Comics Heroine" list.
- In 2022, CBR.com ranked Jessica Drew 5th in their "5 Best Spider-Man Clones" list.
- In 2022, MovieWeb included Jessica Drew in their "8 LGBTQ+ Marvel Comics Characters That Need to Be in the MCU" list.

== In other media ==
=== Film ===
Jess Drew / Spider-Woman appears in Spider-Man: Across the Spider-Verse (2023), voiced by Issa Rae. Described as an "original creation" and "wholesale reinvention of the concept" of the comic book Jessica Drew, this version is an African American Spider-Woman who rides a motorcycle and serves as a leading member of Miguel O'Hara's Spider-Society and mentor to Gwen Stacy / Spider-Woman. A composite character of the Earth-616 and Earth-1610 Jessica Drews, she has the spider-powers and fingertip-webs of the Ultimate Spider-Woman from Ultimate Spider-Man and the pregnancy of the Earth-616 Jessica Drew from Spider-Woman: Spider-Verse. Furthermore, alternate universe comic book-accurate incarnations of the Ultimate Spider-Woman make background cameo appearances as additional members of the Spider-Society.

- Jess Drew / Spider-Woman will return in Spider-Man: Beyond the Spider-Verse (2027) and the Gwen Stacy-led spin-off film Spider-Woman, with Rae reprising her role.

=== Video games ===
- Ultimate Spider-Woman appears as an unlockable playable character in Spider-Man Unlimited.
- Ultimate Spider-Woman (referred to as "Spider-Girl") appears as a playable character in Lego Marvel's Avengers via the Spider-Man DLC pack.
