= Ultimate Comics: All-New Spider-Man =

2011–2013 Marvel Comics series

- Artwork for the cover of Ultimate Comics: All-New Spider-Man no. 1 (September 2011); Art by Sara Pichelli and Justin Ponsor

Publication information
- Publisher: Marvel Comics
- Schedule: Monthly
- Format: Ongoing series
- Genre: Superhero
- Publication date: September 2011 – October 2013
- No. of issues: 29
- Main character(s): Spider-Man (Miles Morales); Ultimate Spider-Woman

Creative team
- Written by: Brian Michael Bendis
- Pencillers: Sara Pichelli; Chris Samnee; David Marquez
- Colorist: Justin Ponsor

Ultimate Comics: All-New Spider-Man was a monthly comic book series published by Marvel Comics that debuted in September 2011 as part of the second re-launch of the Ultimate Marvel imprint. It followed the "Death of Spider-Man" storyline that concluded the series Ultimate Spider-Man, to which Ultimate Comics: Spider-Man served as a sequel. Written by Brian Michael Bendis and illustrated by Sara Pichelli, the series also served as a continuation of elements from the miniseries Ultimate Comics: Fallout and focuses on the all-new Spider-Man, Miles Morales. The series was set in a continuity shared with other relaunched Ultimate Marvel titles including Ultimate Comics: X-Men and Ultimate Comics: Ultimates. The title ended in October 2013; the adventures of Miles continue in Miles Morales: The Ultimate Spider-Man, released in July 2014.

== History ==
After the "Death of Spider-Man" story arc, in which Peter Parker was killed, the title's third volume was launched, in which writer Brian Michael Bendis and artist Sara Pichelli depicted Parker's mantle being passed on to Miles Morales.

== Characters ==
- Miles Morales / Spider-Man II – A thirteen-year-old boy living with both his parents, though he also attends a charter school and roommates with his best friend Ganke Lee and another student named Judge. He has managed to meet a few people associated with the former Spider-Man, including Gwen Stacy, Mary Jane, Aunt May, Spider-Woman and Nick Fury.
- Gwen Stacy – Now living a normal life, having briefly dated Peter Parker prior to his death.
- May Parker – Aunt of the deceased Peter Parker.
- Jessica Drew / Spider-Woman – A female clone of Peter Parker, sharing most of his memories.
- Peter Parker / Spider-Man – The first Spider-Man, originally thought to be killed by the Green Goblin, apparently returns, and meets Miles, later assisting him in a battle against a recently returned Green Goblin.

=== Villains ===
- Norman Osborn / Green Goblin – Spider-Man's oldest nemesis. Thought to be dead, he returns and breaks the Ultimate Six out of the Triskelion to kill Peter Parker, calling themselves the 'Men of God'.
- Max Dillon / Electro – A former criminal empowered with electrokinesis by Hammer Industries. He is freed from prison by Osborn to kill Peter Parker.
- Elijah Stern / Tinkerer – An evil scientist who tries to get revenge on the company Roxxon.
- Aaron Davis / Prowler – A cat burglar named Aaron Davis, brother of Miles' father Jefferson, and Miles' paternal uncle.
- Maximus Gargan / Scorpion – A Mexican mob boss named Maximus Gargan who worked with Miles Morales' uncle Aaron Davis, a.k.a. The Prowler.
- Edward Brock Jr. / Venom – Peter Parker's childhood friend, bonded to a protoplasmic, semi-sentient black suit known as a Symbiote.
- Arkady Gregorivich Rossovich / Omega Red – A mutant zealot who was created by Weapon X.

== Reception ==
Reviewing the first issue, James Hunt of Comic Book Resources rated issue #1 four and a half out of five stars. Hunt called the issue "technically strong", and praised the writing and art. He defended the absence of Peter Parker in the book, stating that the story's chronology and need to establish Miles and his supporting cast necessitated this, though he felt that story was over far too quickly, and would've benefited from a double-sized issue. Although Hunt noted that while Bendis paced Miles' origin story slowly enough that Miles does not yet appear in costume (much as Bendis had done with Peter Parker), he did so in order to emphasize character, which Hunt felt Bendis did well. Reviewing the same issue for Newsarama, David Pepose wrote that "the biggest victory that Bendis scores with Miles Morales is that he makes us care about him, and care about him quickly. Even though we're still scratching the surface of what makes him tick, we're seeing the world through his eyes, and it's similar to Peter Parker's but a whole lot tougher. But that kind of Parker-style guilt — that neurotic, nearly masochistic tendency for self-sacrifice that comes with great power and greater responsibility — is still intact." Jesse Schedeen of IGN wrote that "Miles still feels like a bit of an outsider in his own book. Bendis never quite paints a complete picture of Miles - his thoughts, motivations, personality quirks, and so forth. Miles is largely a reactionary figure throughout the book as he confronts struggles like registering for a charter school or dealing with family squabbles." Schedeen also opined that "Miles occupies a more urban, racially diverse, and tense landscape. All the story doesn't pander or lean too heavily on elements like racial and economic tension to move forward. Miles is simply a character who speaks to a slightly different teen experience, and one not nearly as well represented in superhero comics as Peter's."

== Contributors ==
This list only includes comics already released.

Writers

- Brian Michael Bendis (# 1-28)

Artists

- Sara Pichelli (# 1–5; 8, 19–22)
- Chris Samnee (#6-7)
- David Marquez (#9-15, 16.1; 18, 23–28)
- Pepe Larraz (#16-17)

== See also ==
- Ultimate Spider-Man
- Ultimate Comics: Doomsday
- Ultimate Comics: Fallout
