= Ultimate Comics: Hawkeye =

2011 comic book series

- Ultimate Comics: Hawkeye #1, by Rafa Sandoval

Publication information
- Publisher: Marvel Comics
- Format: Limited series
- Genre: Superhero
- Publication date: 2011
- No. of issues: 4

Creative team
- Written by: Jonathan Hickman
- Penciller: Rafa Sandoval
- Inker: Jordi Tarragona
- Colorist: Brad Anderson
- Editor: Alex Alonso

Ultimate Comics: Hawkeye was a 2011 comic book miniseries, starring Hawkeye. It is part of the Ultimate Marvel imprint, and had 4 issues. It was written by Jonathan Hickman and drawn by Rafa Sandoval.

== Publication history ==
The Ultimate Marvel comics were relaunched in 2011, as part of the "Ultimate Comics reborn". Jonathan Hickman wrote one of the main series, Ultimate Comics: Ultimates, and also one for Hawkeye. He put emphasis on the character's background as military and an agent of S.H.I.E.L.D., as those were distinctive traits that set him apart from the mainstream version of the character. He also removed the suit created by Joe Madureira in The Ultimates 3, and used one closer to the initial version by Bryan Hitch.

== Plot ==
A group of scientists in the SEAR create a virus that cancels mutations, and a serum that kick-starts it. With both of them, they would become the only country with mutants in the world. Hawkeye tries to get a sample of the serum, but the plan gets out of control: the SEAR mutants, known as "the people", rebel against the government, make a coup, and establish a new nation instead. Known as "New Tian", it becomes a safe haven for mutants. Hulk is teletransported to the Himalayas and the mutants working with him desert, but Hawkeye returns with a sample of the serum.
