= Ultimate Comics: The Ultimates =

Comic book series

Ultimate Comics The Ultimates
- Artwork for the cover of Ultimate Comics: The Ultimates 1 (Aug 2011); Art by Esad Ribic

Publication information
- Publisher: Ultimate Marvel (Marvel Comics)
- Schedule: Monthly
- Format: Ongoing series
- Genre: Superhero
- Publication date: August 2011 – November 2013
- No. of issues: 30

Creative team
- Written by: Jonathan Hickman; Sam Humphries; Joshua Hale Fialkov
- Artist(s): Esad Ribic; Brandon Peterson; Luke Ross; Butch Guice; Leonard Kirk; Patrick Zircher; Ron Garney; Billy Tan; Timothy Green II

Ultimate Comics: The Ultimates was a monthly comic book series published by Marvel Comics that made its debut in September 2011 as part of the second re-launch of Ultimate Marvel. Through the "Ultimate Universe Reborn" tagline following the "Death of Spider-Man" and written by Jonathan Hickman with art by Esad Ribic, the series also serves as a continuation of elements from Ultimate Comics: Fallout, and existed alongside other relaunched Ultimate Marvel titles including Ultimate Comics: Spider-Man and Ultimate Comics: X-Men. The series continued the adventures of the Ultimates, including Nick Fury, Thor and Iron Man.

== Publication history ==
The Ultimates was re-launched under the "Ultimate Universe Reborn" tagline, along with Ultimate Comics: Spider-Man and Ultimate Comics: X-Men. While past Ultimates comics were limited series, Ultimate Comics: The Ultimates is an ongoing monthly series. Written by Jonathan Hickman (writer of other Ultimate works such as Ultimate Comics: Thor, Ultimate Comics: Fallout and Ultimate Comics: Hawkeye), and illustrated by Esad Ribic, the title will now be called Ultimate Comics: Ultimates. The first story arc, "The Republic is Burning", takes place at the same as Hickman's other miniseries Ultimate Comics Hawkeye.

Beginning with issue #10, Sam Humphries co-wrote with Hickman, and from issue #13 he became the sole writer of the series.

== Contributors ==
Writers

- Jonathan Hickman (#1-12; 2011-2012)
- Sam Humphries (#10-24, 18.1; 2012-2013)
- Joshua Hale Fialkov (#25-#30; 2013)

Artists

- Esad Ribic (#1-9; 2011-2012)
- Brandon Peterson (#5-6; 2011-2012)
- Luke Ross (#10-12, #15-18; 2012)
- Butch Guice (#11; 2012)
- Leonard Kirk (#11; 2012)
- Patrick Zircher (#11; 2012)
- Billy Tan (#13-14; 2012)
- Timothy Green II (#14; 2012)
- Dale Eaglesham (#18.1; 2012)
- Scot Eaton (#19-21; 2012-2013)
- Joe Bennett (#22-24; 2013)
- Carmine Di Giandomenico (#25-30; 2013)

== Storylines ==
The first story arc by Jonathan Hickman had the emergence of two new superhuman threats, The People in the Southeast Asian Republic led by the brothers Xorn and Zorn, and the children of Tomorrow, led by Reed Richards. While the first story arc ended with Asgard destroyed and S.H.I.E.L.D. in pieces, the last story arc which began with Jonathan Hickman as writer but ended with Sam Humphries as his replacement, had the Ultimates victorious and Reed Richards arrested for his crimes. In the first Sam Humphries solo story arc Captain America returns to an America on the brink of destruction.

== Characters ==
=== Main characters ===
- Nick Fury: The director of SHIELD and original founder of the Ultimates.
- Thor: The Asgardian God of Thunder based on the Norse deity of the same name.
- Tony Stark/Iron Man: A billionaire industrialist who assumes the public role of hero in a mechanical suit of his own invention.
- Clint Barton/Hawkeye: A master marksman who utilizes only a small array of weapons: his bow and arrows. His miniseries Ultimate Comics: Hawkeye takes place simultaneously with the first few issues of Ultimates.
- Monica Chang/Black Widow: The second Black Widow (after Natalia Romanova) and ex-wife of Nick Fury.
- Jessica Drew/Spider-Woman: A female clone of the recently deceased superhero teenager Spider-Man. She shares most of his memories and first appears in issue three.
- Jamie Braddock/Captain Britain: After the European Union reconstituted the Excalibur Super-Soldier Program, Jamie Braddock became their leader as the new Captain Britain, replacing his severely ill brother Brian. Eventually Jamie joins the Ultimates.
- Sam Wilson/Falcon: An explorer, adventurer and scientist who uses a backpack with high-tech folding wings to fly.

=== Other characters ===
- Bruce Banner/Hulk: Formerly a member of Ultimate X and the Ultimates who is still trying to resolve his Hulk issues. Banner is able to use his conscious mind when in Hulk form, but tends to revert to the brutish speech pattern of the Hulk when aggravated.
- Excalibur Class Super-Soldier Program: The European division of Super-Soldier which is their equivalent to America's Ultimates. Captains France, Captain Italy, Captain Spain and the new Captain Britain reside there.
- William/Jarvis II: Iron Man's new assistant that he calls Jarvis, partly due to the original Jarvis' death in Ultimates 2.
- Miles Morales/Spider-Man: A teenage superhero who uses the same name as the original Spider-Man.

== Reception ==
Since the beginning of the relaunch, the series has received an overall highly positive reception. Chad Nevett from Comic Book Resources wrote that "the comic is exciting and sets up a large story that, right now, seems like it could easily end with the destruction of the team. A first issue that starts with its foot on the gas is exactly what's called for", whilst IGN gave the first issue 8/10. By issue 7, Chadd Nevett commented that "since relaunching Ultimate Comics Ultimates, Jonathan Hickman, Esad Ribic and Dean White have produced one of the best comics at Marvel." When further commenting on the current state of Ultimate Comics line, Joshua Yehl of IGN stated, "the direction of Ultimate Comics X-Men is curious, while Spider-Man's is a steady stream of solid issues, but Ultimates has risen to a place where the best elements of sci-fi and super heroes have combined into an unforgettable tale".

== Collected editions ==
Title	Material collected	ISBN	Release date
Vol. 1: The Republic Is Burning	Ultimate Comics Ultimates #1–6	0-7851-5717-4	2012-03-12
Vol. 2: Two Cities. Two Worlds	Ultimate Comics Ultimates #7–12	0-7851-5719-0	2012-08-01
Ultimate Comics Divided We Fall, United We Stand	Ultimate Comics Ultimates #13-18, Ultimate Comics X-Men #13-18, Ultimate Comics Spider-Man Vol. 2 #13-18	978-0785184164, also 978-0785167815	2012-10-15
Ultimate Comics Ultimates by Sam Humphries Vol. 1	Ultimate Comics Ultimates #18.1, 19-24	978-0785161745	2013-07-16
Ultimate Comics Ultimates: Disassembled	Ultimate Comics Ultimates #25-30	978-0785167242	2013-11-12
Cataclysm: The Ultimates' Last Stand	Cataclysm: The Ultimates' Last Stand #1-5, Cataclysm: Ultimates #1-3, Cataclysm: Ultimate X-Men #1-3, Cataclysm: Ultimate Spider-Man #1-3, Hunger #1-4, Cataclysm #0.1, Survive #1	978-0785189190	2014-03-18
Ultimate Marvel By Jonathan Hickman Omnibus	Ultimate Thor #1-4, Ultimate Comics Hawkeye #1-4, Ultimate Comics Ultimates #1-12, material from Ultimate Fallout #2-6	978-1302956936	2024-03-19

== See also ==
- Ultimates
- The Ultimates (comic book)
- Ultimate Comics: Thor
- Ultimate Comics: Fallout
- Ultimate Comics: Hawkeye
