= Justin Ponsor =

American comics colorist (1977–2019)

Justin "J-Po" Ponsor (April 20, 1977 – May 18, 2019) was an American comics colorist.

Ponsor was born in San Diego, California. After graduating from Palomar College, Ponsor began his professional career in 1996, working for WildStorm as an in-house colorist. He went freelance in 2000 and was one of the first creatives at CrossGen in 2002. In 2005, he began coloring almost exclusively for Marvel. His work on Avengers earned him a nomination for a Golden Issue Award by ComicBook.com in 2018.

Ponsor died on May 18, 2019, after a two-year battle with cancer. He continued working up until his death.
