= List of Ultimate X-Men characters =

The Ultimate X-Men are a team of mutant superheroes that appear in comic books published by Marvel Comics. The codenames listed under "Character" are those used during the time frame of the particular iteration. Characters with more than one codename for that period have them listed chronologically and separated by a slash (/). Bolded names in the most recent iteration published are the current team members.

== X-Men ==
The X-Men have since been divided into different groups:

=== Kitty Pryde's Free Mutants ===
| Character | Real name | Joined in | Notes |
|---|---|---|---|
Founding members
| Shadowcat / Sprite | Katherine "Kitty" Pryde | Ultimate X-Men #21 | Having reunited with her fellow mutants after the death of Peter Parker, Kitty helps spearhead a campaign to protect mutants who are being hunted down by Sentinels. After striking a deal with President Captain America, she (and the mutants who did not want to take a cure to rid them of their powers) were allowed to live "freely" on a reservation dubbed Utopia. She was elected leader of the group, although her approach causes friction with Nomi Blume, who eventually defects along with a number of mutants. |
| Storm | Ororo Munroe | Ultimate X-Men #1 | Having been imprisoned after the events of Ultimatum along with Colossus, she eventually makes her way to the Mutant haven Utopia, and sides with Kitty in deciding who would be the leader over the small remaining group of mutants. |
| Rogue | Marian (full name unrevealed) | Ultimate X-Men #32 | Having been in hiding after the events of Ultimatum, she eventually reappears, seemingly on William Stryker's side. However, it was a ruse to stop his killing of mutants. She eventually joins Kitty's team in Utopia. |
| Wolverine | Jimmy Hudson | Ultimate X #1 | The son of Wolverine, and adopted son of the Hudsons. He has a healing factor and retractable claws, which he is able to cover with organic metal, much like Colossus. After leaving Karen Grant's X-Team, he eventually stumbles upon Kitty and the rest of the mutants. He eventually begins a romantic relationship with Kitty, and is second-in-command. It is revealed in Ultimate Comics: Wolverine #2 that his mother is Madga, and is half-siblings with Pietro and Wanda Lensherr. |
| Blackheath | Samuel Smithers | Ultimate Comics: X-Men #18 | A mutant whose powers is related to botany, he originally sided with Nomi during the initial vote over who would be leader in Utopia. He continued to work with Kitty for a time, although it was to spy for Nomi. He eventually defected from Nomi's group and joined with Kitty. |
| Black Box | Seth Vale | Ultimate Comics: X-Men #19 | Although a minor character in Utopia, he has become close friends with Jimmy, and co-starred with him in Ultimate Comics: Wolverine #2. |
| Armor | Hisako Ichiki | Ultimate Comics: X-Men #17 | She first appears as a young Japanese child being held captive in one of William Stryker's Mutant internment camps. After being rescued by Iceman and Husk, she joins their Mutant resistance movement. In this continuity, Hisako's energy armor takes the form of animals including a large, glowing dragon and a panda bear. |
| Magma | Amara Aquilla | Ultimate Comics: X-Men #19 | A former mutant prisoner of Camp: Angel (along with Storm and Colossus), she joined Kitty Pryde's resistance in the Ultimate Marvel title, Ultimate Comics: X-Men. Her powers include fire and mantle manipulation. |
| Zero | Kenji Uedo | Ultimate Comics: X-Men #18 | Although initially part of Nomi's rebellious mutants and leaving the settlement, for unknown reasons, he defected to Kitty's group. |
| Micromax | Scott Wright | Ultimate Comics: X-Men #19 | Although initially part of Nomi's rebellious mutants and leaving the settlement, for unknown reasons, he defected to Kitty's group. His powers include mass/size manipulation. |

=== Original X-Men ===
| Character | Real name | Joined in | Notes |
|---|---|---|---|
**Founding members**
| Professor X | Charles Xavier | Ultimate X-Men #1 | Team founder, headmaster of the Xavier Institute for Gifted Youngsters (now the Xavier Institute for Higher Learning). Presumed to have died in issue #78 and revealed to be alive in the future in issue #80. Rejoined the X-Men as headmaster and mentor once again in issue #93. During Ultimatum, Xavier is killed after Magneto snaps his neck. |
| Beast (Marvel Comics) | Henry "Hank" J. McCoy | Ultimate X-Men #1 | Team's medical doctor and biologist. Thought dead, but revealed to be alive and working for S.H.I.E.L.D. in issue #81. Rejoined the X-Men in issue #88. Beast is killed by the Ultimatum Wave during the "Ultimatum" storyline. |
| Colossus | Piotr "Peter" Nikolaievitch Rasputin | Ultimate X-Men #1 | Left the X-Mansion in issue #80 to live with Northstar. Returned to the X-Men in issue #94 with no explanation to his return and an addiction to "Banshee". After battling the X-Men, Jean Grey revealed Northstar to still be alive after his supposed death. Colossus then returns (alongside his X-Men team) to Xavier's X-Men. |
| Cyclops | Scott Summers | Ultimate X-Men #1 | Field leader. Left the team for a short while to join the Brotherhood, but later returned to the X-Men. Broke up the X-Men when Xavier "died". After Xavier's "death", Cyclops became headmaster of the Institute along with Jean Grey. Following Xavier's return, he returned to the X-Men. He began using Banshee and officially left Xavier's team for Colossus's team, before eventually returning. Cyclops was killed by Quicksilver during the Ultimatum storyline. |
| Iceman | Robert "Bobby" Drake | Ultimate X-Men #1 | Youngest member of the original team. Student at the Xavier Institute. Left the X-Men when Cyclops disbanded them, without joining Bishop's new team. Returned as an X-Man after Xavier's return in issue #93. |
| Marvel Girl | Jean Grey | Ultimate X-Men #1 | Girlfriend of Cyclops. Former teacher and former headmistress of the Xavier Institute. Went missing after issue #93. Returned in issue #94. Featured in Ultimate Comics: X |
| Storm | Ororo Munroe | Ultimate X-Men #1 | Second field leader. Helped Bishop make a new team of X-Men following Xavier's "death", before eventually returning. Longtime member of the X-Men. |
**Later recruits**
| Wolverine | James "Lucky Jim" Howlett / Logan | Ultimate X-Men #3 | Formerly Magneto's assassin and the original Weapon X. Left in issue #80 to find answers about his past. Joined Bishop's X-Men in issue #83 and returned to the institute after Xavier's return. During the Ultimatum storyline, Wolverine is killed by Magneto. |
| Shadowcat | Katherine "Kitty" Pryde | Ultimate X-Men #21 | Spider-Man's ex-girlfriend. Left the team in issue #79, featured in Ultimate Comics: Spider-Man. |
| Nightcrawler | Kurt Wagner | Ultimate X-Men #32 | Former member of Weapon X. He was previously psychically incapacitated by Professor X for kidnapping Dazzler, but escaped in issue #79 following Xavier's death. Was made leader of the Morlocks afterward, but returned to the X-Men in issue #94 with no explanation on his return. Currently is an X-Man. He was revealed to be part of Colossus's team, but later returned to Xavier's X-Men. He was also thought to have been deceased by Jean in issue #98 after being hit by the Ultimatum Wave. |
| Rogue | Marian (full name unrevealed) | Ultimate X-Men #32 | Currently a student at the Xavier Institute and a member of the X-Men. She was revealed to be part of Colossus's team. She eventually returned to Xavier's X-Men after battling her teammates. |
| Angel | Warren Worthington III | Ultimate X-Men #40 | Was expelled from the X-Men by Professor X as a cover for him to join Emma Frost's Academy of Tomorrow as a spy. He joined as a member of Bishop's new X-Men. He was shot and killed by Mister Sinister in issue #90 and later revived in issue #93 by Jean Grey/Phoenix, and is now an X-Man again. He was revealed to be part of Colossus's team. He soon returned to the X-Mansion and Xavier's X-Men. During the Ultimatum storyline, Angel is killed by Sabretooth. |
| Dazzler | Allison "Ali" Blaire | Ultimate X-Men #48 | Left the X-Men after Nightcrawler kidnapped her in Ultimate X-Men Annual #2. Joined the new X-Men in issue #82. Returned to the Institute following Xavier's return. She was then revealed to be part of Colossus's team. After a battle against Xavier's X-Men, the separate X-Men teams conjoined into one again. Dazzler was killed during Magneto's attack in the Ultimatum storyline. |
| Syndicate | Luke and Matthew (surname unrevealed) | Ultimate X-Men #58 | Conjoined twins, working as a private agent for Professor X. Never seen with the rest of the team until issue #93 where they became X-Men. Syndicate was killed by William Stryker. |
| Magician | Elliot Boggs | Ultimate X-Men #69 | A reality warping mutant. Current whereabouts unknown. |
| Bishop | Bishop (full name unrevealed) | Ultimate X-Men #77 | Time traveler from the future. Leader and founder of the new X-Men. Bishop was later killed by Wolverine. |
| Pyro | (Presumably) John Allerdyce | Ultimate X-Men #82 | Former Morlock. Recruited into the new X-Men by Bishop and Storm in issue #82. Defected to the Brotherhood of Mutant Supremacy. Had both his hands cut off by Valkyrie and following Ultimatum is possibly dead. |
| Psylocke | Elizabeth "Betsy" Braddock | Ultimate X-Men #84 | Former S.T.R.I.K.E. agent. Inherited the body of a woman known as Kwannon after being possessed by Proteus and then killed by Colossus. Joined Bishop's team as a member of the new X-Men. Returned to the X-Mansion as one of Xavier's X-Men. Current whereabouts unknown. |
| Toad | Mortimer Toynbee | Ultimate X-Men #93 | Former Brotherhood member. Became a teacher at the Xavier Institute after Cyclops disbanded the X-Men in issue #81. After Xavier was revealed to be alive and returned as Headmaster of the institute, Toad became one of Xavier's X-Men. Current whereabouts unknown. |
| Firestar | Elizabeth "Liz" Allan | Ultimate X-Men #94 | Friend of Mary Jane and Peter Parker from the Ultimate Spider-Man series. Joined the Xavier Institute and the X-Men after she found out she was a mutant. Was revealed to have returned to civilian life with her half-brother, Blob, and later joined Jean Grey's new X-Team |

=== Colossus's X-Men ===
Colossus established this branch of the X-Men, whose members take the mutant-enhancing drug Banshee.

| Character | Real name | Joined in | Notes |
|---|---|---|---|
| Colossus | Piotr "Peter" Nikolaievitch Rasputin | Ultimate X-Men #94 | Created his own X-Men team when he was revealed by Jean Grey to be taking the mutant enhancing drug Banshee. He made the team go on a mission to save his boyfriend, Northstar; but, unfortunately, Northstar became paraplegic due to an overdose on Banshee. |
| Angel | Warren Worthington III | Ultimate X-Men #94 | Joined Colossus's team and began using Banshee in order to save Northstar and defeat Alpha Flight. His appearance on Banshee is altered, making him look like a humanoid bald eagle. |
| Dazzler | Allison "Ali" Blaire | Ultimate X-Men #94 | Joined Colossus's team and began using Banshee in order to save Northstar and defeat Alpha Flight. Her powers are now greatly enhanced, allowing her to create solid light constructs. |
| Nightcrawler | Kurt Wagner | Ultimate X-Men #94 | Joined Colossus's team and began using Banshee in order to save Northstar and defeat Alpha Flight. His costume is altered, covering him in leather, and he now has cosmic swords. His teleportation abilities have greatly enhanced, allowing him to generate purple smoke and flames. |
| Rogue | Marian | Ultimate X-Men #94 | Joined Colossus's team and began using Banshee in order to save Northstar and defeat Alpha Flight. She can now control her powers and permanently has Colossus's steel skin, Angel's feathered wings, and Nightcrawler's yellow eyes. She kissed Cyclops, possibly trying to start a relationship. |
| Cyclops | Scott Summers | Ultimate X-Men #95 | Joined Colossus's team as an undercover agent for Xavier and Jean Grey. He faked his doses of Banshee until he met his match against Vindicator. He took Banshee and was able to absorb solar energy throughout his body, enabling him to control his optic blasts and fly. This knowledge was discovered by the X-Men and Cyclops temporally left Xavier's team for Colossus's team. |

== Emma Frost's Academy of Tomorrow ==
The Academy of Tomorrow is loosely linked to the X-Men.

| Character | Real name | Notes |
|---|---|---|
| Emma Frost | | A former student and girlfriend of Professor X who is the headmistress of the Academy of Tomorrow. During the Ultimatum storyline, Frost is killed by Multiple Man. |
| Havok | Alex Summers | Cyclops' brother. Field leader and student of the Academy of Tomorrow. Was put in a mental hospital following the Ultimatum storyline. Was later taken by the U.S. Government for unknown reasons and is currently under the watch of Layla Miller. |
| Cannonball | Sam Guthrie | Student at the Academy of Tomorrow. During the Ultimatum storyline, Cannonball is killed by Multiple Man. |
| Cypher | Douglas Ramsey | Non-mutant genius. Student at the Academy of Tomorrow. During the Ultimatum storyline, Cypher is killed by Multiple Man. |
| Northstar | Jean-Paul Beaubier | Son of Canada's ambassador to the U.S. Colossus's boyfriend. Former student at the Academy of Tomorrow until he was kidnapped by Alpha Flight. Alpha Flight overdosed him with Banshee which resulted in him becoming paralyzed from the waist down. It is unknown whether he returned to the academy or stayed with Colossus at the X-Mansion. He was killed during the Ultimatum storyline. |
| Polaris | Lorna Dane | Havok's girlfriend. Student at the Academy of Tomorrow. Was briefly imprisoned in the same cell as Magneto. During the Ultimatum storyline, Polaris is killed by Multiple Man. |
| Sunspot | Roberto Da Costa | Mutant vigilante from Harlem. Student at the Academy of Tomorrow. During the Ultimatum storyline, Sunspot is killed by Multiple Man. |
| Angel | Warren Worthington III | Joined the Academy of Tomorrow to act as a spy for Professor X. Later returned to the X-Men. |
| Beast | Henry "Hank" J. McCoy | Former X-Man. Presumed dead, but was working for S.H.I.E.L.D. and later returned to the X-Men. |
| Dazzler | Allison "Ali" Blaire | Punk rock singer. Left the academy to join the X-Men. |
| Karma | Xi'an "Shan" Coy Mahn | S.H.I.E.L.D. Psi-Ops operative placed on the team as a mole for the U.S. government. Left the team after her mission was accomplished. Current whereabouts unknown. |
| Shinobi Shaw | | Emma Frost's boyfriend. Leader of the Hellfire Club. Revealed to still be alive following the Ultimatum Wave in Ultimates #1. |
| Colossus | Piotr "Peter" Nikolaievitch Rasputin | Northstar's boyfriend. He moved to the academy after Xavier's death and left when Xavier returned. |

== Karen Grant's The Runaways ==
| Character | Real name | Notes |
|---|---|---|
| Karen Grant | Jean Grey | A former member of the X-Men, Jean assumes the name of Karen Grant and forms a new X-Team following Ultimatum |
| Jimmy Hudson | | The son of Wolverine, and adopted son of the Hudsons. He has a healing factor and retractable claws, which he is able to cover with organic metal, much like Colossus. |
| Guardian | Derek Morgan | A young mutant from Chicago. He is able to fly by growing a pair of bird-like wings which can be retracted. When he grows his wings out, his eyes turn red, his fingernails grow into talons, and his canine teeth appear to become sharp. |
| Firestar | Elizabeth "Liz" Allan | Spider-Man's former classmate who vanished to Southern California after Ultimatum. |
| Hulk | Bruce Banner | First introduced to the series in the fifth and final issue of Ultimate Comics: X |

== Enemies ==
=== Nomi Blume's Renegades ===
| Character | Real name | Joined in | Notes |
|---|---|---|---|
**Founding members**
| Mach II | Nomi Blume | Ultimate Comics: X-Men #13 | Wielding the power of magnetism, Nomi was initially hiding in the Morlock Tunnels along other mutants who were protected by the X-Men. After the war is over and the mutants move to Utopia, Nomi's hatred for Kitty is very apparent. It originated from Kitty's actions of leaving any mutant who wanted to take the government's cure to remove their powers, and for "abandoning" her during the war against the Sentinels (although Kitty actually denied her help because Nomi was too young). She challenged Kitty's authority. After the "destruction" of the Seed, she (and a small group of like-minded mutants) defect and leads her group out of Utopia with the intent to fight for freedom. |
| Iceman | Robert "Bobby" Drake | Ultimate X-Men #1 | After the death of Peter Parker, Bobby rejoins the X-Men. Initially siding with Kitty after the events of the war, he eventually defected to Nomi's team after he was convinced by his girlfriend Husk of a better future with Nomi leading the charge. |
| Psylocke | Elizabeth "Betsy" Braddock | Ultimate X-Men #84 | Although having been listed as dead after the events of Ultimatum, it appears that Psylocke is alive, having transferred her consciousness into another body before her death (however, oddly no one recognizes or remembers her). She sides with Nomi after the events of the war, and eventually leaves with Nomi after the Seed was "destroyed". In Ultimate Comics: X-Men #24, it is revealed that she has enlisted Warpath (who is in love with her) to betray both Kitty and Nomi. In Ultimate Comics: X-Men #27, Jean Grey (herself in disguise) unmasked Psylocke as being a fake, revealed her to be Mothervine, who set out to destroy both Utopia and Tian. |
| Warpath | James Proudstar | Ultimate Comics: X-Men #18 | Warpath is a mutant who possesses superhuman physical ability in virtually all areas, including enhanced strength, agility, and senses. He is one of the mutants seen in the mutant resistance against William Stryker, and later one of the twenty mutants who decided to retain their powers instead of taking the "cure", and inhabited the new mutant nation "Utopia". In Ultimate Comics: X-Men #24, it is revealed that he is working with Psylocke to betray both Kitty and Nomi. |
| Shola Inkosi | | Ultimate Comics: X-Men #17 | A Mutant with the power of combat telekinesis. |
| Husk | Paige Guthrie | Ultimate Comics: X-Men #15 | A mutant from the Southwest. Husk was brainwashed by William Stryker to infiltrate Kitty Pryde's mutant resistance. She led Pryde and her party to the mutant underground. During this time, Husk began a relationship with Bobby Drake. Following Pryde's defeat of Stryker, Husk killed 5 mutants by setting off a bomb while in line for "the cure". After being arrested and rehabilitated, Husk joined the other mutants in Utopia, choosing to side with Mach II over Pryde. |

=== The Brotherhood of Mutant Supremacy ===
| Character | Real name | Notes |
|---|---|---|
**Founding members**
| Magneto | Erik Lensherr | Founder of the Brotherhood of Mutant Supremacy. Lost his arm, but replaced it with a new metal arm. Thought to be alive in Ultimate Comics: X-Men #7, but later revealed to be an illusion by Sinister. |
| Blob | Frank (full name unknown) | Obese mutant with super strength and a cannibal. Giant-Man bit off his head during the Ultimatum storyline in retaliation for killing Wasp. |
| Detonator | Ricky Gibson | Rescued by Magneto and Xavier from a lynch mob. Killed by Multiple Man during the Ultimatum storyine. |
| Mastermind | Unknown | Mutant illusionist. He was decapitated by Valkyrie. |
| **Quicksilver** | Pietro Lensherr (Ultimates background, falsified for public consumption, listed real name as Pietro Lensherr Maximoff) | Magneto's son. Former member of the Ultimates. Rejoined forces with his father following Scarlet Witch's death. Thought to have been killed by Hawkeye while saving his father, but survived. |
| Scarlet Witch | Wanda Lensherr (Ultimates background, falsified for public consumption, listed real name as Wanda Lensherr Maximoff) | Magneto's daughter. Former member of the Ultimates and killed in Ultimates #3 by a lovelorn Ultron in a plot by Doctor Doom. She appeared to be alive in Ultimate X. However, it is eventually revealed she is nothing but an illusion created by Mister Sinister. |
| Toad | Mortimer Toynbee | Mutant with toad-like powers and appearance. After briefly returning to the Brotherhood, he eventually defected to the X-Men following Xavier's death. Died from unknown reasons following the Ultimatum Wave. |
| **Mystique** | Raven Darkhölme | Shapeshifting mutant. Xavier's former lover. Helped Magneto escape from prison. |
| Wolverine | James "Lucky Jim" Howlett / Logan | Disillusioned and betrayed Magneto. Longtime member of the X-Men, but Magneto ripped the adamantium off of his bones following the Ultimatum Wave, which killed him. |
**Later recruits**
| Cyclops | Scott Summers | Joined the Brotherhood as a mole for Professor X. After surviving the Ultimatum Wave and the war against Magneto, he was assassinated by Quicksilver during a speech to the public. |
| Forge | (Presumably) Jonathon Silvercloud | The Brotherhood's tech sage. |
| Hard-Drive | Unknown | Was presumed a prisoner in Camp X-Factor. |
| Juggernaut | Cain Marko | Former Weapon X prisoner. Shot in the eye with a dart fired by an anti-mutant soldier during the Ultimatum storyline. |
| Longshot | Arthur Centino | Wanted murderer. |
| Lorelei | Unknown, possibly Lorelei | Formerly in Brotherhood and attacked the Ultimates in Ultimatum #3 alongside Magneto. |
| Multiple Man | Madrox (full name unrevealed) | Stem cells were grafted onto the Schizoid Man of the Liberators by the French military. Killed by Wolverine during the Ultimatum storyline. |
| Rogue | Marian (full name unrevealed) | Former Weapon X prisoner. |
| **Sabretooth** | Victor Creed | Brother of Wolverine. High-ranking officer of Weapon X. |
| Stacy X | Unknown | Replaced Mystique in Triskelion along with her boyfriend Mastermind. Unknown if dead or alive. |
| Unus | Unknown | Magneto's psi-talent. Presumably was a prisoner in Camp X-Factor, but later returned to Magneto. Killed by Thor in Ultimates 3 #4. |
| Vanisher | Unknown | Mutant with teleporting powers. Presumably was a prisoner in Camp X-Factor, but later returned to Magneto. Unknown if dead or alive following the Ultimatum Wave. |
| Pyro | (Presumably) John Allerdyce | Pyrokinetic. Former Morlock and X-Man. Presumed deceased after Valkyrie chopped off his hands. |
**Animal Evolutionaries**
| Orb Weaver | Unknown | A spider-like mutant. |
| Prosimian | Unknown | An ape-like mutant. One of the mutant animals rescued by the Brotherhood. He was killed by Magneto who deemed the Animal Evolutionaries to be lower than humans |
| Saluki | Unknown | A dog-like mutant. One of the mutant animals rescued by the Brotherhood. |
| Sumatran | Unknown | A rhinoceros-like mutant. |
| Kathleen | | A centipede-like mutant. |

=== Weapon X ===
| Character / Real name | Notes |
|---|---|
**Willing members**
| Col. John Wraith / Vindicator | Former leader of Weapon X. Current leader of Alpha Flight as Vindicator. |
| Dr. Abraham Cornelius | Chief scientist for Weapon X. |
| Sabretooth | Rejoined the Brotherhood during the Ultimatum storyline and current whereabouts and status is unknown. |
| Tara (full name unrevealed) | A rogue Weapon X agent, was apparently present during Wolverine's adamantium bonding. Tara later died by suicide. |
| Deathstrike / Yuriko Oyama | An old acquaintance of Storm, codenamed Project "Y". Deathstrike was killed by Longshot. |
**Prisoners**
| Wolverine / James "Lucky Jim" Howlett / Logan | Canadian paratrooper captured and experimented on during the Gulf War. The original Weapon X. |
| Nightcrawler / Kurt Wagner | Mutant teleporter kidnapped from Bavaria. Former X-Man and Morlock leader. |
| Rogue / Marian (full name unrevealed) | Mutant kidnapped from Mississippi. |
| Juggernaut / Cain Marko | Rogue's cellmate. |
| X-Men | Were kidnapped from their mansion in Westchester. The roster at the time consisted of Professor X, Cyclops, Marvel Girl, Storm, Beast, Colossus, and Iceman. |

=== The Morlocks ===
| Character | Real name | Notes |
|---|---|---|
| Sunder | Unknown | Former leader of the Morlocks. Presumed deceased following the Ultimatum Wave. |
| Leech | Unknown | Former member of the Morlocks. Leech was shot and killed by Sinister as a sacrifice for Apocalypse. |
| Callisto | Unknown | Presumed deceased following the Ultimatum Wave. |
| Sparks | Unknown | Sparks is able to generate electricity, which she uses to provide power to the Morlocks' living space. Presumed deceased following the Ultimatum Wave. |
| Caliban | Unknown | Presumed deceased following the Ultimatum Wave. |
| Pyro | (Presumably) John Allerdyce | Former Morlock. Recruited into the new X-Men by Bishop and Storm in Ultimate X-Men #82. Later joins the Brotherhood. |
| Nightcrawler | Kurt Wagner | Former member of Weapon X. Previously was psychically incapacitated by Professor X for kidnapping Dazzler, but escaped in Ultimate X-Men #79 following Xavier's death. Former leader of the Morlocks. Returned to the X-Men in issue #94 with no explanation for his return to the X-Men and departure with the Morlocks. |
| Many other unnamed Morlocks | Various | |

=== Alpha Flight ===
Each of the members of Alpha Flight have their powers enhanced by the mutant-enhancement drug Banshee. Alpha Flight debuted in Ultimate X-Men #94, where its members attacked the X-Men during their softball game.

| Character | Real name | Notes |
|---|---|---|
| Vindicator | Col. John Wraith | He is the leader of Alpha Flight. |
| Shaman | John Proudstar | |
| Jubilee | (Presumably) Jubilation Lee | Appears to have the powers of Boom Boom from Earth-616. |
| Sunfire | (Presumably) Shiro Yoshida | |
| Sasquatch | Rahne Sinclair | While Rahne Sinclair has the same abilities as her Earth-616 counterpart, the Banshee drug enables her to assume a Sasquatch-like form. |
| Snowbird | Danielle "Dani" Moonstar | |
| Aurora | Jeanne-Marie Beaubier | Sister of Northstar, who attends the Academy of Tomorrow. |

== Other teams ==
=== Bishop's X-Men ===
| Character | Real name | Joined in | Notes |
|---|---|---|---|
| Bishop | Bishop (full name unrevealed) | Ultimate X-Men #81 | Time traveller from the future. Leader and founder of the new X-Men. Killed by Wolverine in issue #90. |
| Storm | Ororo Munroe | Ultimate X-Men #81 | Second field leader. Helped Bishop make a new team of X-Men following Xavier's "death". Now lives at X-Mansion and is the second field leader to the X-Men. |
| Pyro | (Presumably) John Allerdyce | Ultimate X-Men #82 | Former Morlock. Recruited into the new X-Men by Bishop and Storm in issue #82. Was part of Xavier's X-Men, but joined the Brotherhood of Mutant Supremacy. |
| Dazzler | Alison "Ali" Blaire | Ultimate X-Men #82 | Left the X-Men after Nightcrawler kidnapped her in Ultimate X-Men Annual #2. Joined Bishop's X-Men in issue #82, and forced Bishop to take Angel as a member of his team. She went on to join Colossus's X-Men, but eventually switched back to Xavier's cause. |
| Angel | Warren Worthington III | Ultimate X-Men #83 | Was expelled from the X-Men by Professor X as a cover for him to join Emma Frost's Academy of Tomorrow as a spy. He joined as a member of Bishop's new X-Men. He died, but was later revived by Jean Grey. |
| Wolverine | James "Lucky Jim" Howlett / Logan | Ultimate X-Men #84 | Formerly Magneto's assassin and the original Weapon X. Left in issue #80 to find answers about his past. Joined Bishop's X-Men in issue #83. |
| Psylocke | Elisabeth "Betsy" Braddock (in Kwannon's body) | Ultimate X-Men #84 | After hearing the news of Professor X's death, she returns to the mansion and learns that the X-Men are being disbanded. She joins Bishop's team as a member of the new X-Men. Currently a part of Xavier's team. |
| Beast | Henry "Hank" J. McCoy | Ultimate X-Men #88 | Thought dead, but revealed to be alive and working for S.H.I.E.L.D. in issue #81. Joined Bishop's X-Men to be with Storm in Ultimate X-Men #88. Currently a part of Xavier's team. |

=== Xavier Institute Student Body ===
| Character | Real name | Joined in | Notes |
|---|---|---|---|
**Original student body**
| Beast | Henry "Hank" J. McCoy | Ultimate X-Men #1 | Former student of the Institute until his departure in issue #40. He later returned to the X-Men, but was killed by the Ultimatum Wave. |
| Colossus | Piotr "Peter" Nikolaievitch Rasputin | Ultimate X-Men #1 | Former student of the Institute until his departure in issue #80 for the Academy of Tomorrow. He now leads his own X-Men, taking the drug Banshee to enhance their powers. |
| Cyclops | Scott Summers | Ultimate X-Men #1 | Former student of the Institute until Xavier's death in issue #78, after which he was named Co-Headmaster of the Institute alongside Jean Grey and Storm. He remained with the X-Men until his assassination by Quicksilver in Ultimatum #5. |
| Iceman | Robert "Bobby" Drake | Ultimate X-Men #1 | Former student at the Institute and former boyfriend of Rogue until she began taking Banshee. He is an X-Man as well, but he is considered to be only a junior X-Man. Still a member of the X-Men, but the Xavier Institute's status is unknown following the Ultimatum Wave. |
| Jean Grey | | Ultimate X-Men #1 | Former student at the Institute until Xavier's death in issue #78, after which she was named Co-Headmistress of the Institute alongside Cyclops and Storm. |
| Storm | Ororo Munroe | Ultimate X-Men #1 | Former student at the Institute until later on in the series when she graduated (off-panel) and began training. She later became Co-Headmistress of the Institute alongside Cyclops and Jean Grey following Xavier's "death". |
**Later recruited students**
| Shadowcat | Katherine "Kitty" Pryde | Ultimate X-Men #21 | Former student at the Institute until she departed in issue #79 to be with Spider-Man. |
| Nightcrawler | Kurt Wagner | Ultimate X-Men #32 | Former student at the institute. He went crazy and kidnapped Dazzler in Ultimate X-Men Annual #2 and left the X-Men. He came back only to begin abusing the drug Banshee and leave again. He rejoined the Institute later only to be killed by the Ultimatum Wave. |
| Rogue | Marian (full name unrevealed) | Ultimate X-Men #32 | Former student at the institute. Briefly left when she began using Banshee and joined Colossus's X-Men. She is still a member of the X-Men, but the Xavier Institute's status is unknown following the Ultimatum Wave. |
| Angel | Warren Worthington III | Ultimate X-Men #40 | Former student at the Institute until he was expelled in issue #65. He later returned only to begin using Banshee and join Colossus's X-Men. He once again returned soon after. He was murdered by Sabretooth during the Ultimatum storyline. |
| Dazzler | Allison "Ali" Blaire | Ultimate X-Men #48 | Former student at the institute. Former student of the Academy of Tomorrow. She became comatose in issue #65. She later returned only to begin using Banshee and join Colossus's X-Men to save Northstar. She returned again thereafter. Killed by the Ultimatum Wave. |
| Syndicate | Luke and Matthew (surname unrevealed) | Ultimate X-Men #58 | Began working for Xavier undercover without the X-Men knowing, until Xavier returned. They then joined the X-Men and the student body. Killed during the Purifier raid on the Xavier Institute. |
| Magician | Elliot Boggs | Ultimate X-Men #68 | Brainwashed the X-Men into letting him join, until it was discovered and he was defeated by them in issue #72. Current whereabouts and status is unknown. |
| Psylocke | Elizabeth "Betsy" Braddock (in Kwannon's body) | Ultimate X-Men #84 | Revealed to be a student when Bishop and Storm picked her up from the institute to join the new X-Men team. She had since returned to the Institute along with the rest of the X-Men. However, she is believed to be deceased following the Ultimatum Wave or may just be missing in action. |
| Firestar | Elizabeth "Liz" Allen | Ultimate X-Men #94 | Joined the Institute and X-Men when Xavier resumed his position as Headmaster and after she discovered she was a mutant. She currently resides on Tian. |
| Various unidentified students | Various | | |

=== Xavier Institute Teaching Staff ===
| Character | Real name | Joined in | Notes |
|---|---|---|---|
| Professor X | Charles Xavier | Ultimate X-Men #1 | Founder of the Xavier Institute and founder of the X-Men. Original and current reigning Headmaster of the institute. Killed by the Phoenix (Jean Grey) with her mind. |
| Storm | Ororo Munroe | Ultimate X-Men #1 | Began training students in the Danger Room and later teaching them. Former Co-Headmistress alongside Cyclops and Jean Grey following Xavier's death. |
| Wolverine | James "Lucky Jim" Howlett / Logan | Ultimate X-Men #1 | Began training students in the Danger Room and later teaching them strategic moves. Killed by Magneto, who ripped the adamantium off of his bones. |
| Cyclops | Scott Summers | Ultimate X-Men #78 | Began as a Co-Headmaster alongside Jean Grey and Storm, later only Jean Grey, and remained in a teaching role after Xavier returned. He went undercover in Colossus's X-Men, but took a dose of Banshee. He returned to the X-Men only to be assassinated by Quicksilver in Ultimatum #5. |
| Jean Grey | | Ultimate X-Men #78 | Began as a Co-Headmistress alongside Cyclops and Storm, later only Cyclops, and became second-in-command to Xavier when he returned. |
| Toad | Mortimer Toynbee | Ultimate X-Men #81 | Cyclops hired him in a teaching position following Xavier's "death". He became an X-Man when Xavier returned. Presumed deceased following the Ultimatum Wave, but may just be missing in action. |
| Beast | Henry "Hank" J. McCoy | Ultimate X-Men #94 | Began teaching when he returned with the X-Men to the Institute following Xavier's return. Killed by the Ultimatum Wave. |

=== Other villains ===
- Apocalypse
- Arcade
- Crimson Dynamo
- Fenris
- Hellfire Club (led by Shinobi Shaw)
- Major Domo
- Mojo Adams
- Moira MacTaggert
- Proteus
- Omega Red
- Reavers
- Sentinels
- Sinister
- Stryfe
- Bolivar Trask
- Shen-Yin Zorn

== X-Men allies ==
- Dai Thomas
- Spider-Man (Peter Parker)
- Fantastic Four
- Lilandra and the Shi'ar
- Daredevil (Matt Murdock)
- Ultimates

== Neutral characters ==
- Gambit
- Spiral
- Ultimates
- S.H.I.E.L.D.
