= List of Ultimate X-Men story arcs =

Ultimate X-Men, a Marvel Comics series, has covered 19 story arcs since the first issue's debut in February 2001. Mark Millar wrote most of the first 33 issues, followed by Brian Michael Bendis for 12 issues, Brian K. Vaughan for 20 issues, and Robert Kirkman for 28 issues. Aron Eli Coleite, known for his work on the television series Heroes, took over the book for the remaining seven issues, concluding with his Requiem story.

Film director Bryan Singer, who directed X-Men and X2, was scheduled to write 12 issues of Ultimate X-Men with Brian K. Vaughan and X2 scripters Michael Dougherty and Dan Harris, but was unable to commit due to working on Superman Returns.

== Mark Millar ==
Ultimate X-Men was the second comic to debut as part of the Ultimate Marvel line, predated a few months by Ultimate Spider-Man. Mark Millar reinvented the X-Men with the first X-Men film (which debuted seven months before) as his only reference. The plot of "The Tomorrow People" was what Millar had in mind for the first X-Men film, and "Return to Weapon X" would have been the plot to the sequel. As in the film, Millar's original X-Men consisted of telepath Professor X, Cyclops, Jean Grey, Storm, Beast, Colossus, and Iceman. In its first year, the series was the best-selling comic book of 2001.

=== The Tomorrow People ===
- Originally published in: Ultimate X-Men #1-6 (February 2001 - July 2001)
- Creators: writer Mark Millar, artist Adam Kubert (#1-4), Andy Kubert (#5-6)
- Plot outline: The government begins building and releasing Sentinels to hunt mutants after the Brotherhood of Mutant Supremacy declares war against humans. Professor Charles Xavier unites a group of teenage mutants to form a group called the "X-Men" to stop the Brotherhood. Millar immediately establishes differences between the mainstream and Ultimate universes by reinventing the pasts and motives of several characters. For example, Jean Grey recruits Colossus after a nuclear arms deal goes bad, and Wolverine joins the team with the ulterior motive of assassinating Xavier. Some themes remain the same, however, such as the love triangle involving Wolverine, Jean Grey and Cyclops.
- Notes: This arc's main plot revolves around Wolverine's search for his past and the Weapon X facility. Originally, Adam and Andy Kubert were both to illustrate Ultimate X-Men so that it could be published on a regular basis, but Andy moved to illustrating Origin and was unable to continue. The series' first arc sold extremely well: the first issue sold out, and the fourth and fifth issues sold more than 100,000 copies each to U.S. comic book stores alone.

=== Return to Weapon X ===
- Originally published in: Ultimate X-Men #7-12 (August 2001 - January 2002)
- Creators: writer Mark Millar, artist Adam Kubert
- Plot outline: While Wolverine is away, Xavier and his X-Men are kidnapped and taken to Weapon X. Wolverine tricks Weapon X into capturing him so he can lead the Brotherhood into Weapon X and free his companions. The mutants are ready to begin a massacre, but General Nick Fury steps in, arrests the Weapon X staff and declares all mutants free.
- Notes: Millar continues to distinguish settings in the Ultimate universe from their mainstream counterparts. In this arc, Weapon X is introduced as a S.H.I.E.L.D.-initiated project based in Finland to force mutants to carry out covert missions for the government. John Wraith (aka Kestrel) and Abraham Cornelius are established as the heads of Weapon X, while Nightcrawler, Rogue, and Juggernaut have been part of the Weapon X team for some time. Mark Millar had a kidney infection during the summer of 2001 and wrote two of the issues in this arc while hospitalized, leading to a darker-than-normal tone. While Rogue has always been portrayed as a Southern Baptist, Ultimate Rogue is more believing and devout than Rogue in the normal Marvel continuity.

=== You Always Remember Your First Love ===
- Originally published in: Ultimate X-Men #13-14 (February 2002 - March 2002)
- Creators: writer Chuck Austen, artist Esad Ribić
- Plot outline: Cajun mutant Remy LeBeau (Gambit) is homeless on the streets of New York. One day, he takes in a little girl whose parents have been murdered. When she, too, is abducted, he takes bloody revenge on those responsible: Hammerhead and his mob henchmen.
- Notes: This is the only arc which features writer Chuck Austen, who got the job of writing Uncanny X-Men because of his work on Ultimate X-Men. This arc preceded Austen's eventual resignation from Marvel and controversy at DC Comics.

=== A Different World is Possible ===
Originally published in: Ultimate X-Men #15 (April 2002)

Plot outline: Professor Xavier talks with Colossus and Magneto about his new book and the mutant war.

=== World Tour ===
- Originally published in: Ultimate X-Men #16-20 (May 2002 - September 2002)
- Creators: writer Mark Millar, artists Chris Bachalo and Adam Kubert
- Plot outline: The X-Men are shocked to find that Magneto is still alive and Xavier is trying to rehabilitate him. Xavier's mutant son David MacTaggert (Proteus) escapes from Moira MacTaggert's secret mutant hospital on Muir Island and kills thousands while possessing Betsy Braddock. David and Betsy are finally killed by Colossus, who considers leaving the X-Men, but changes his mind.
- Notes: The Ultimate version of Proteus is an amalgam of Legion (David Xavier, Charles Xavier's and Gabrielle Haller's son) and the mainstream version of Proteus (Kevin MacTaggert, son of Moira MacTaggert). In the original Proteus saga (Uncanny X-Men #125-128, 1979) Proteus is killed by Colossus, who drops a car on him. Millar has described this arc as "X-Men meets Magnolia." In this arc, Colossus' rescue of a capsized submarine crew is an allusion to the real-life Kursk submarine disaster. Millar also hints that Colossus may be gay, with Piotr remarking that his favourite show is Will & Grace (which features a gay male lead).

=== Hellfire and Brimstone ===
- Originally published in: Ultimate X-Men #21-25 (October 2002 - January 2003)
- Creators: writer Mark Millar, artists Kaare Andrews and Adam Kubert
- Plot outline: The remnants of Magneto's Brotherhood, led by Quicksilver and Scarlet Witch, destroy the nuclear arsenals of India and Pakistan to get into the good graces of the U.S. government. Shadowcat is recruited, while Wolverine and Cyclops fight over Jean. All three go to the Savage Land, and Shadowcat saves Wolverine and Cyclops from a giant computer. Meanwhile, the Hellfire Club awakens the Phoenix Force in Jean, and she kills the whole club. The Brotherhood frees Magneto.
- Notes: While the previous arc was action-oriented, Millar uses this storyline to more fully develop his characters. The love triangle involving Jean, Scott, and Wolverine, heats up and is much more violent than in the original version. In "Ultimate Marvel" Millar depicts Shadowcat as a bright, clever girl, but she's not as smart as her mainstream counterpart (created by John Byrne and Chris Claremont).

=== Ultimate War ===
- Originally published in: Ultimate War #1-4 (February 2003 - April 2003)
- Creators: writer Mark Millar, artist Chris Bachalo
- Plot outline: The Brotherhood declares the second war against humanity, and Xavier and the X-Men are branded as traitors. Things get worse when Wolverine and Shadowcat report that Cyclops has been killed in the Savage Land. The Ultimates track down the X-Men and have an all-out fight in New York. Xavier is captured but, thanks to Iceman, the rest escape.
- Notes: "Ultimate War" is not purely an X-Men arc; rather, it is the first crossover between the Ultimates and the Ultimate X-Men, although it establishes the plot for the "Return of the King" arc. A fight between the X-Men and the Avengers (the mainstream Marvel version of the Ultimates) was also the subject of X-Men (vol. 1) #9 (1965) by Stan Lee.

=== Return of the King ===
- Originally published in: Ultimate X-Men #26-33 (February 2003 - July 2003)
- Creators: writer Mark Millar, artist Adam Kubert and David Finch
- Plot outline: The Brotherhood plans an attack on humanity. Cyclops is alive, but at the bottom of a pit (thanks to Wolverine). Forge has created a machine to amplify Magneto's powers, but Shadowcat and the X-Men foil the Brotherhood's plans. In the end, the X-Men turn themselves over to the authorities and are pardoned. Betsy Braddock is revealed to be alive after her consciousness passes to the body of a comatose Asian girl named Kwannon.
- Notes: In this arc, Rogue switches sides of her own free will to help the X-Men prevent a nuclear explosion. In the mainstream Marvel Comics, she switches sides because she absorbs the mind of superhero Carol Danvers (Uncanny X-Men #171).

== Brian Michael Bendis ==
After Mark Millar's tenure, Ultimate Spider-Man writer Brian Michael Bendis took over for a year. Bendis was originally slated to write both Ultimate X-Men and Ultimate Spider-Man from their conception, but turned down Ultimate X-Men because of the challenge of writing a team book. He has stated that he was going to plot his story in a more character-driven way–especially concerning Wolverine, who has previously tried to kill his teammate Cyclops.

=== Blockbuster ===
- Originally published in: Ultimate X-Men #34-39 (August 2003 - January 2004)
- Creators: writer Brian Michael Bendis, artist David Finch
- Plot outline: This arc focuses on Wolverine as unknown assailants ambush him. Wolverine tries to learn the motives of his attackers with the help of Spider-Man and Daredevil, stars of comics Bendis had previously written. Wolverine learns they are ex-Weapon X members, and he is then saved by the X-Men. The assailants kill themselves rather than reveal any further information. Later, a S.H.I.E.L.D. attack force arrives and reveals that the Weapon X team members are only flunkies in a larger, more insidious anti-mutant conspiracy.
- Notes: Colorist Dave Stewart, who colored Ultimate X-Men #39, won an Eisner Award in 2005 for his work on Ultimate X-Men, Daredevil, and Captain America.

=== New Mutants ===
- Originally published in: Ultimate X-Men #40-45 (February 2004 - July 2004)
- Creators: writer Brian Michael Bendis, artist David Finch
- Plot outline: The first three issues of this arc are stand-alone introductions of individual characters, including Ultimate versions of Angel, Jude the Entropic Man, and Dazzler. Meanwhile, the government has Emma Frost create a mutant team. She recruits Alex Summers, Dazzler, Karma, and Beast. At the team's kickoff a Sentinel is defeated by the X-Men, but not before Beast is killed.
- Notes: Bendis continued the tradition of modernizing mainstream characters when introducing them into the Ultimate Universe. For example, Dazzler debuted in 1980 as a disco star in the regular Marvel continuity. In Ultimate Marvel continuity, she is a punk rocker. Brian K. Vaughan believed "Ultimate Dazzler...may very well be Bendis' single greatest contribution to the free world," which led to her continued integration as part of the X-Men in his later story arcs. The mainstream version of Emma Frost is a telepath and former member of the Hellfire Club, who later becomes an educator and gains the power to turn into organic diamond. Bendis introduces her Ultimate counterpart as an educator who turns into diamond, without her original powers or membership.

== Brian K. Vaughan ==
Brian K. Vaughan created many stand-alone story arcs, tying them together during the final arc. Although he was initially worried about alienating new readers or hard-core fans, he eventually focused on "simply trying to tell great stories about young people who are feared and hated because they're different." He was originally slated to write just four issues, but enjoyed working on Ultimate X-Men and ultimately wrote 20 issues. Marvel asked him to extend his run when production on Superman Returns prevented Bryan Singer from starting his run. Vaughan turned down the offer, and finished his run with "Magnetic North".

=== The Tempest ===
- Originally published in: Ultimate X-Men #46-49 (July 2004 - September 2004)
- Creators: writer Brian K. Vaughan, artist Brandon Peterson
- Plot outline: The X-Men investigate a series of mutant killings. The killer is Nathaniel Essex (also known as Mr. Sinister), who has delusions that a "Lord Apocalypse" is ordering him to kill mutants. Sinister infiltrates the institute, defeats Xavier, Iceman and Angel, and is about to go on a killing spree when Rogue knocks him out and saves the day. Sinister is taken into custody by S.H.I.E.L.D.

=== Cry Wolf ===
- Originally published in: Ultimate X-Men #50-53 (October 2004 - January 2005)
- Creators: writer Brian K. Vaughan, artist Andy Kubert
- Plot outline: On a field trip, the X-Men are ambushed by Gambit, who leaves a wake of destruction, and uses the chaos to kidnap Rogue. He presents her to his superiors (the Fenris twins), who offer Rogue the ability to touch. She refuses, and flees with Gambit. Later Rogue, saying she feels alienated by the X-Men, leaves with Gambit. Wolverine and Storm temporarily leave the team.
- Notes: Issue #50 marked the return of artist Andy Kubert, who illustrated issues #5 and #6, and was originally slated to be a recurring artist. There is a love triangle among Shadowcat, Rogue, and Iceman in this arc. Vaughan suggests that Iceman is attracted to Rogue because the two can never be intimate.

=== The Most Dangerous Game ===
- Originally published in: Ultimate X-Men #54-57 (February 2005 - May 2005)
- Creators: writer Brian K. Vaughan, artist Stuart Immonen
- Plot outline: Mojo Adams produces a reality show on Krakoa, where his assassin, Arcade, hunts and kills accused mutant felons. Mojo's current and longest-lasting contestant, Longshot, is accused of killing Lord Scheele (a Genoshan politician and the lover of Longshot's off again-on again girlfriend Spiral). Professor Xavier sends half of the X-Men to the island to investigate. Other members of the X-Men (led by Dazzler) travel to the island without Xavier's knowledge to free Longshot. Xavier becomes angry when it turns out Longshot is guilty. An injured Angel takes the blame for Dazzler, and they start dating.
- Notes: This arc's plot is similar to the man-hunting plot from Richard Connell's 1924 short story, "The Most Dangerous Game." Several of the characters are adapted from the mainstream universe, with major changes placing them on Earth instead of in alternate realities. Mojo, an overweight alien, becomes Mojo Adams, an overweight albino human. Major Domo, Mojo's right-hand alien, becomes a businessman. Longshot is transformed from a heroic alien into a mutant felon. The role of his girlfriend, Spiral, is reversed from villainess to victim. Arcade is an evil genius in mainstream Marvel, with no ties to Mojo. Vaughan was complimented for pulling off this story arc without using Wolverine, who is notably absent.

=== Hard Lessons ===
- Originally published in: Ultimate X-Men #58-60, Ultimate X-Men Annual #1 (June - Aug 2005, Oct 2005)
- Creators: writer Brian K. Vaughan, artists Steve Dillon, Stuart Immonen, Tom Raney
- Plot outline: Charles Xavier witnesses a bank robbery by a grotesque, psi-resistant conjoined twin mutant named Syndicate. Xavier realizes that they became criminal only to help their terminally ill sister, and he offers the conjoined twins a chance to redeem themselves. He fakes Syndicate's death and instructs them to wait in a safe house. Storm picks up Wolverine in the north, where he is searching for his past. An adamantium-laced, cybernetically enhanced Yuriko Oyama (aka Lady Deathstrike) attacks them. Her benefactor is the sinister Abraham Cornelius, from Weapon X. Cornelius is apparently killed, and Yuriko is restrained. Juggernaut escapes S.H.I.E.L.D.'s custody and tracks down Rogue, his old flame. He meets her (and her lover, Gambit) just after they have stolen the Crimson Gem of Cyttorak. Gambit loses his life in a fight with Juggernaut, who absorbs the gem. Rogue retrieves Gambit, giving him one last kiss before he dies. When Rogue phones her ex-boyfriend, Iceman, she is afraid that she has permanently absorbed Gambit's memories and powers.
- Notes: In the beginning of his run, Vaughan had difficulty bridging the gap between new and veteran readers, but found his stride during this collaboration with Steve Dillon. In the mainstream Marvel continuity, Yuriko Oyama is also an adamantium-laced cyborg. The Ultimate X-Men Annual #1 was published between issues #62 and #63 of Ultimate X-Men, four years into the series' run. It is the first annual for any X-Men line since Bill Jemas decided that additional regular issues should be printed, instead of publishing an annual. As with all other first annuals of the Ultimate line, this annual has a self-contained story. The annual proved to be a success, becoming the third annual in the Ultimate Marvel line to sell out.

=== Magnetic North ===
- Originally published in: Ultimate X-Men #61-65 (September 2005 - January 2006)
- Creators: writer Brian K. Vaughan, artist Stuart Immonen
- Plot outline: Emma Frost has assembled the Academy of Tomorrow, a second heroic mutant group consisting of Havok, Polaris, Northstar, Sunspot, Cypher, and Cannonball. Polaris is put into Magneto's plastic prison cell, because Forge and Mystique cause the AoT's first mission to go awry. The AoT frees her, and the X-Men are forced to fight the Ultimates when they try to stop the breakout. Professor X expels Angel for insubordination, only to send him to the AoT as a spy. Colossus reveals to Nightcrawler that he is dating Northstar, a hint that he is coming out.
- Notes: Colossus comes out of the closet in Ultimate X-Men #65. In Ultimate Marvel, Mystique is reinvented as Magneto's right-hand woman (a parallel to the three X-Men movies). In the mainstream comics, Mystique and Magneto barely meet.

== Robert Kirkman ==
Robert Kirkman took on the mantle of writer when Bryan Singer once again could not commit to writing for the title. His run was originally scheduled for only nine issues, but was extended. Kirkman believed the Ultimate Marvel universe had developed a strong enough footing in order to not have to rely on "who's getting Ultimatized this week." He also believed that the Ultimate universe should retain its differences from the mainstream universe. As a result, he planned to introduce one character unique to the Ultimate universe and one character who already existed in the mainstream universe. These characters became the Magician and Lilandra Neramani, respectively.

=== Date Night ===
- Originally published in: Ultimate X-Men #66-68 (March 2006 - May 2006)
- Creators: writer Robert Kirkman, artist Tom Raney
- Plot outline: Kirkman explores the private lives of the X-Men as they finally have a night off for the first time since "The Tomorrow People" arc. Scott and Jean see a movie. Iceman and Rogue capitalize on her loss of powers, and make love. Wolverine and Storm go to a bar. Sabretooth attacks them in order to obtain a tissue sample from Logan to deliver to his superior, Abraham Cornelius of Weapon X. Piotr and Kurt visit a comatose Alison. Kurt is sad, because she chose Angel over him. He is also uncomfortable with Piotr's sexuality. Kitty meets her new crush, Spider-Man, and Xavier has dinner with Lilandra. Lilandra is head of the powerful and wealthy Shi'ar cult that worships a phoenix, who they think has been reborn in Jean Grey. Lilandra is the mainstream character Kirkman planned to introduce to the Ultimate universe at the start of his run.
- Notes: In this arc, Kurt's homophobia takes on a hostile feel for the first time.

=== Phoenix? ===
- Originally published in: Ultimate X-Men #69-71 (June 2006 - August 2006)
- Creators: writer Robert Kirkman, artist Ben Oliver
- Plot Outline: Kirkman advances the Phoenix storyline, as Lilandra and her assistant examine Jean to determine whether she is the Phoenix deity or merely insane. Elliot Boggs (Magician) becomes the first original Ultimate universe character to join the X-Men, as the Brotherhood of Mutants attack the Academy of Tomorrow's homecoming dance. In side plots, Nightcrawler confesses to the comatose Dazzler that he hates Piotr for revealing his homosexuality, and Piotr and Jean-Paul Beaubier to the homecoming dance. Rogue begins applying Gambit's powers in battle.
- Notes: In issue #69, Kirkman wrote Wolverine out of the remainder of the story arc by having Nick Fury secretly ask him to meet in Harlem. This allows Wolverine to meet (and do battle with) the Hulk in the Ultimate Wolverine vs. Hulk miniseries.

=== Magical ===
- Originally published in: Ultimate X-Men #72-74 (September 2006 - November 2006)
- Creators: writer Robert Kirkman, artist Tom Raney
- Plot Outline: Magician's powers have no limits when he helps the X-Men battle the Friends of Humanity. Nick Fury visits the X-Mansion to inform Xavier that he wants to enlist Magician in the Ultimates. However, Xavier suspects something is amiss when he realizes Fury does not recall bringing Magician to the X-Men. A battle ensues when they realize Magician has manipulated the X-Men. Wolverine and Jean Grey defeat Magician, but Shadowcat later learns from Magician that his death was another deception.
- Notes: Mike Cotton, senior staff writer of Wizard magazine, criticized Kirkman for his writing on issue #74. Cotton wrote that, while Kirkman is skilled, he failed to make the issue a must-read. The characters sounded like their 616 universe counterparts instead of teenagers.

=== Breaking Point ===
- Originally published in: Ultimate X-Men Annual #2 (October 2006)
- Creators: writer Robert Kirkman, artist Salvador Larroca
- Plot outline: Kirkman ties up several plot lines in this special issue. Flashbacks reveal Nightcrawler's Weapon-X training prior to joining the X-Men, and Rogue's worries about kissing Gambit when he died (and its aftereffects). In the present, Dazzler awakens from her coma, but is kidnapped by Nightcrawler, who has become obsessed with her. The X-Men rescue Dazzler and try to calm Nightcrawler. However, a fight breaks out when Nightcrawler insults Colossus' homosexuality. During the battle, Rogue discovers that Gambit's powers have left her and her own powers have returned. Nightcrawler's Weapon-X training helps him take out most of the team, until Rogue accidentally knocks him unconscious with her original powers. Dazzler quits the team when Professor Xavier decides to keep Nightcrawler unconscious, instead of having him arrested. Kitty confesses to Storm that she still has feelings for Iceman.
- Notes: The origin of Xavier's pet cat, Mystique, is explained in a two-page extra story illustrated by Leinil Francis Yu. The issue was criticized for its chronology: Wolverine and Professor Xavier discuss events occurring at the end of the Magician storyline in this issue, although it was published before the conclusion of that arc.

=== Cable ===
- Originally published in: Ultimate X-Men #75-78 (December 2006 - March 2007)
- Creators: writer Robert Kirkman and artists Ben Oliver and Yannick Paquette (main story), writer Sean McKeever and artist Mark Brooks (backup story)
- Plot Outline: In this arc, the story diverts away from romance and drama and towards action. Cable, a time traveler, arrives in the present on Jean Grey's 20th birthday to assassinate Professor Xavier. Another time traveler, Bishop, arrives to save Professor Xavier's life. Cable kidnaps Jean Grey, and the X-Men take the fight to him. Xavier tries to put an end to the fight. When Cyclops tries to stop him, Xavier says that he loves Jean. Cyclops and the Professor arrive to stop Cable, but are no match for the mercenary. In the end, Cable's mission is successful. While he has kept Cyclops busy, he throws a futuristic grenade at Xavier, incinerating all but his skeleton. Cable and the other members of the Six Pack return to the future, leaving Bishop stranded in the present.
- Notes: Kirkman liked Cable's paramilitary look from his comic book appearances in the 1990s, so he made it his goal to have Cable "use every piece of equipment hanging off of him." However, he chose to change Cable's history. In the mainstream Marvel universe, Cable is the time-displaced son of Cyclops. In this story arc, Kirkman has Cable reveal himself to be Wolverine's future self, although without his healing ability. Cable is also somehow able to touch his past self and not be eaten by the Time Spiders introduced in the "President Thor" story arc of Ultimate Fantastic Four.

=== Aftermath ===
- Originally published in: Ultimate X-Men #79-80 (April 2007 - May 2007)
- Creators: writer Robert Kirkman, artist Yannick Paquette
- Plot outline: In this arc, Kirkman explores the emotional aftermath of Professor Xavier's death, not only with respect to current and former X-Men members, but also to their allies and enemies, as well. Kirkman also sends the characters in new directions: Wolverine learns more about his family, Jean discovers that Nightcrawler has escaped, Kitty leaves (and begins appearing in Ultimate Spider-Man with #106), Storm begins work on a play entitled The Shadow King, Nick Fury is working on a secret Legacy project for the government, and Magneto continues his own secret plans. Meanwhile, it is revealed that neither Cable nor Professor X are dead: Cable has transported them both into the future.
- Notes: Critics were unimpressed with Kirkman's account of Xavier's funeral, feeling it lacked emotional impact and did not inspire them to take his death seriously.

=== Cliffhangers ===
- Originally published in: Ultimate X-Men #81 (June 2007)
- Creators: writer Robert Kirkman, artist Ben Oliver
- Plot outline: Beast is revealed to be alive, reluctantly working with S.H.I.E.L.D. to create a cure for the Legacy virus and convinced he is still working with the X-Men (thanks to Professor X's mental manipulation). Storm has a nightmare about the Shadow King, which influences her play. Bishop asks Storm to help him reform the X-Men. Mastermind and Stacy X switch places with Mystique to impersonate Magneto, while Mystique escapes to Magneto's compound.

=== The Underneath ===
- Originally published in: Ultimate X-Men #82-83 (July 2007 - August 2007)
- Creators: writer Robert Kirkman, artist Pascal Alixe
- Plot outline: Toad investigates the Underneath to welcome the Morlocks to Xavier's school on behalf of Cyclops. When he goes missing, Jean, Cyclops, Iceman and Rogue search for him. The four of them are attacked by the Morlocks, while Nightcrawler tries to keep the peace. Nightcrawler saves his old teammates from the Morlocks and, still feeling estranged by Xavier's old students, he stays in the Underneath as the Morlocks' new leader. Bishop and Storm recruit Pyro, Dazzler and Angel for their new X-Men team.

=== Sentinels ===
- Originally published in: Ultimate X-Men #84-88 (September 2007 - January 2008)
- Creators: writer Robert Kirkman, artist Yannick Paquette
- Plot outline: Bishop recruits Wolverine and Psylocke to his new X-Men team to battle the reactivated Sentinels. A man named Stryfe forms the Mutant Liberation Front, rallying mutants to stand up against the humans in response to the death of Charles Xavier. It is revealed that Fenris are behind the funding and creation of the new Sentinels. Beast escapes from S.H.I.E.L.D

=== Shadow King ===
- Originally published in: Ultimate X-Men #89 (February 2008)
- Creators: writer Robert Kirkman, artist Salvador Larroca
- Plot outline: A battle with the X-Men against Abraham Cornelius, Sabretooth and various Wolverine mutants ends their longtime feud when Wolverine kills Cornelius. Storm deals with the love triangle involving her, Beast and Wolverine, causing her to regress into her past and reveal that Amahl Farouk (an ex-lover of hers thought dead) is still alive. His time in mental solitude caused him to become the Shadow King, but with the assistance of the X-Men Storm defeats him. Storm awakes from a coma, revealing that the battle has taken place mentally. She elects to leave that part of her past behind, meaning that she has chosen Beast.

=== Apocalypse ===
- Originally published in: Ultimate X-Men #90-93 (March 2008 - June 2008)
- Creators: writer Robert Kirkman, artist Salvador Larroca
- Plot outline: Sinister has allegedly awakened in (and escaped from) the morgue, and enters the Morlock tunnels to finish what he started: to release Apocalypse by killing more innocent mutants. The X-Men and Morlocks attempt to stop him, but Bishop manipulates his efforts, helping him succeed. Angel is the last mutant to be killed, and Wolverine kills Bishop for aiding Sinister. Sinister transforms into Apocalypse and launches an attack on the city, inciting mutants in the area to fight each other. Spider-Man and the Fantastic Four arrive, but they do not manage to resolve the situation, which is further compounded when Professor X and Cable arrive from the future wearing armor (resembling Onslaught and Stryfe) and attempt to override Apocalypse's mind control. They are outmatched until Jean Grey unleashes the Phoenix, who makes easy work of Apocalypse. At the conclusion, the Phoenix and Jean have merged into one being and proclaim that there are "many things I must do." Then, in a flash, the world is changed back, as if the battle never happened.

== Aron Coleite ==
=== Absolute Power ===
- Originally published in: Ultimate X-Men #94-97 (July 2008 - October 2008)
- Creators: writer Aron Eli Coleite, artist Mark Brooks
- Plot outline: The reunited X-Men find their game of softball against the Academy of Tomorrow interrupted by Alpha Flight. Alpha Flight easily overpowers the X-Men and the Academy of Tomorrow takes Northstar away, claiming he belongs with them. The result of the battle leaves the X-Men bewildered, and seeing an unhappy Colossus convinces Jean she should read his mind. Jean discovers to her dismay that Colossus has been using Banshee, a Mutant Growth Hormone. A furious Peter explains his uselessness without Banshee and, in a discontented state, elects to leave the school. Colossus attempts to take the Blackbird, and Cyclops stops him by offering to help him find Northstar. Colossus reveals that he has already assembled a team consisting of Rogue, Angel, Dazzler and Nightcrawler (all clearly under the influence of Banshee). Cyclops joins the team to keep an eye on them.

=== Ultimatum ===
- Originally published in: Ultimate X-Men #98-100 (January 2009 - April 2009)
- Creators: writer Aron Coleite, artist Mark Brooks
- Plot Outline: New York City is flooded by Magneto, killing millions, including Nightcrawler, Dazzler, and William Stryker's family. Jean Grey leads a team of original core X-Men to New York to fight Magneto. She spurns Rogue, leaving her behind. Rogue teams up with Vindicator (actually Wraith of Weapon X). Stryker and some of his church allies discover pieces of Sentinel armor which have washed up on shore, and make themselves cyborgs using the armor. Rogue knocks out Sabretooth, while Wraith (Vindicator) deals with Juggernaut. Stryker launches an attack on the X-Manor with the other cyborgs, all equipped with Sentinel suits. They show no mercy, and Syndicate is the first to fall.

=== Ultimatum: X-Men Requiem ===
- Published: September 2009
- Creators: writer Aron Coleite, artist Ben Oliver
- Plot Outline: The story revolves around the few surviving X-Men from Ultimatum, and burying the many deceased, and also serves as something of a bridge between Ultimate X-Men and Ultimate Comics: X.

== Collected editions ==
=== Trade Paperbacks ===
#	Title	Material collected	Pages	Released	ISBN
1	The Tomorrow People	Ultimate X-Men #1–6	160	30 Jul 2001	978-0785107880
2	Return To Weapon X	Ultimate X-Men #7–12	144	1 Apr 2002	978-0785108689
3	World Tour	Ultimate X-Men #13–20	192	9 Dec 2002	978-0785109617
4	Hellfire & Brimstone	Ultimate X-Men #21–25	144	3 Mar 2003	978-0785110897
5	Ultimate War	Ultimate War #1–4	112	14 Apr 2003	978-0785111290
6	Return Of The King	Ultimate X-Men #26–33	192	1 Sep 2003	978-0785110910
7	Blockbuster	Ultimate X-Men #34–39	144	22 Mar 2004	978-0785112198
8	New Mutants	Ultimate X-Men #40–45	144	7 Sep 2004	978-0785111610
9	The Tempest	Ultimate X-Men #46–49	112	26 Nov 2004	978-0785114048
10	Cry Wolf	Ultimate X-Men #50–53	96	9 Feb 2005	978-0785114055
11	The Most Dangerous Game	Ultimate X-Men #54–57	104	27 Jul 2005	978-0785116592
12	Hard Lessons	Ultimate X-Men #58–60; Ultimate X-Men Annual #1	120	30 Nov 2005	978-0785118015
13	Magnetic North	Ultimate X-Men #61–65	128	1 Mar 2006	978-0785119067
14:	Phoenix?	Ultimate X-Men #66–71	144	18 Oct 2006	978-0785120193
15	Magical	Ultimate X-Men #72–74; Ultimate X-Men Annual #2	112	17 Jan 2007	978-0785120209
16	Cable	Ultimate X-Men #75–80	160	30 May 2007	978-0785125488
17	Sentinels	Ultimate X-Men #81–88	192	23 Jan 2008	978-0785125495
18	Apocalypse	Ultimate X-Men #89–93	120	30 Jul 2008	978-0785125501
19	Absolute Power	Ultimate X-Men #94–97	112	5 Nov 2008	978-0785129448
	Ultimatum: X-Men/Fantastic Four	Ultimate X-Men #98–100; Ultimate Fantastic Four #58–60	152	23 Dec 2009	978-0785134336

=== Ultimate Collections ===
#	Title	Material collected	Pages	Released	ISBN
1	Ultimate X-Men: Ultimate Collection Book 1	Ultimate X-Men #1–12, ½	336	29 Mar 2006	978-0785121879
2	Ultimate X-Men: Ultimate Collection Book 2	Ultimate X-Men #13–25	336	1 Aug 2007	978-0785128564
3	Ultimate X-Men: Ultimate Collection Book 3	Ultimate War #1–4; Ultimate X-Men #26–33	304	2 Sep 2009	978-0785141877
4	Ultimate X-Men: Ultimate Collection Book 4	Ultimate X-Men #34–45	304	13 Oct 2010	978-0785149231
5	Ultimate X-Men: Ultimate Collection Book 5	Ultimate X-Men #46–57	312	3 Mar 2015	978-0785192923

=== Ultimate Epic Collections ===
- Read more: Marvel Epic Collections

#	Title	Material collected	Pages	Released	ISBN
1	The Tomorrow People	Ultimate X-Men #1-12, ½	336	15 Apr 2025	978-1302963019

=== Oversized hardcovers ===
#	Title	Material collected	Pages	Released	ISBN
1	Ultimate X-Men Volume 1 HC	Ultimate X-Men #1–12	352	1 Aug 2002	978-0785110088
2	Ultimate X-Men Volume 2 HC	Ultimate X-Men #13–25	336	24 Mar 2003	978-0785111306
3	Ultimate X-Men Volume 3 HC	Ultimate X-Men #26–33; Ultimate War #1–4	312	10 Dec 2003	978-0785111313
4	Ultimate X-Men Volume 4 HC	Ultimate X-Men #34–45	304	23 Feb 200	978-0785112518
5	Ultimate X-Men Volume 5 HC	Ultimate X-Men #46–57	296	4 Jan 2006	978-0785121039
6	Ultimate X-Men Volume 6 HC	Ultimate X-Men #58–65, ½; Ultimate X-Men Annual #1	256	30 Aug 2006	978-0785121046
7	Ultimate X-Men Volume 7 HC	Ultimate X-Men #66–74; Ultimate X-Men Annual #2	256	8 Aug 2007	978-0785126058
8	Ultimate X-Men Volume 8 HC	Ultimate X-Men #75–88	352	25 June 2008	978-0785130802
9	Ultimate X-Men Volume 9 HC	Ultimate X-Men #89–97	232	26 Aug 2009	978-0785137795
Premiere Hardcover
	Ultimatum: X-Men/Fantastic Four	Ultimate X-Men #98–100; Ultimate Fantastic Four #58–60	152	20 May 2009	978-0785134329

=== Omnibuses ===
#	Title	Years covered	Material collected	Pages	Released	ISBN
1	Ultimate X-Men Vol. 1	2001-2003	Ultimate X-Men #1-33, 1/2; Ultimate War #1-4	1,024	25 Oct 2022	Adam Kubert X-Men cover: 978-1302946357
1	Ultimate X-Men Vol. 1	2001-2003	Ultimate X-Men #1-33, 1/2; Ultimate War #1-4	1,024	25 Oct 2022	Adam Kubert Wolverine DM cover: 978-1302946364
2	Ultimate X-Men Vol. 2	2003-2006	Ultimate X-Men #34-74, Annual #1-2; Ultimate X-Men/Fantastic Four #1; Ultimate Fantastic Four/X-Men #1	1,160	13 Feb 2024	David Finch cover: 978-1302950118
2	Ultimate X-Men Vol. 2	2003-2006	Ultimate X-Men #34-74, Annual #1-2; Ultimate X-Men/Fantastic Four #1; Ultimate Fantastic Four/X-Men #1	1,160	13 Feb 2024	Andy Kubert DM cover: 978-1302950125
3	Ultimate X-Men Vol. 3	2006-2008	Ultimate X-Men #75-100; Ultimate Wolverine vs. Hulk #1-6; Ultimate X-Men/Ultimate Fantastic Four Annual #1; Ultimate Fantastic Four/Ultimate X-Men Annual #1; Ultimatum #1-5; Ultimate X-Men Requiem #1	1,088	Jan 2026	Michael Turner cover: 978-1302963620
3	Ultimate X-Men Vol. 3	2006-2008	Ultimate X-Men #75-100; Ultimate Wolverine vs. Hulk #1-6; Ultimate X-Men/Ultimate Fantastic Four Annual #1; Ultimate Fantastic Four/Ultimate X-Men Annual #1; Ultimatum #1-5; Ultimate X-Men Requiem #1	1,088	Jan 2026	Ed McGuinness DM cover: TBC
4	Ultimate X-Men Vol. 4	2010-2014	Ultimate X #1-5; Ultimate Comics X-Men #1-33, 18.1; Ultimate Comics Wolverine #1-4; Cataclysm: Ultimate X-Men #1-3; Cataclysm: The Ultimates' Last Stand #4-5; material from Ultimate Fallout #2-6	TBC	Aug 2026	Kaara Andrews cover: TBC
4	Ultimate X-Men Vol. 4	2010-2014	Ultimate X #1-5; Ultimate Comics X-Men #1-33, 18.1; Ultimate Comics Wolverine #1-4; Cataclysm: Ultimate X-Men #1-3; Cataclysm: The Ultimates' Last Stand #4-5; material from Ultimate Fallout #2-6	TBC	Aug 2026	Arthur Adams DM cover: TBC

== See also ==
- List of Ultimate Fantastic Four story arcs
- List of Ultimate Spider-Man story arcs
- Ultimate Comics: X
