= Magician (Marvel Comics) =

The Magician is the name of three fictional characters appearing in American comic books published by Marvel Comics.

== Publication history ==
The first version (Lee Guardineer) first appeared in Tales to Astonish #56 (June 1964), and was created by Stan Lee and Dick Ayers. His surname, Guardineer, is a reference to Fred Guardineer, creator of the magician characters Zatara, Tor, and Merlin the Magnificent.

== Fictional character biography ==
=== Lee Guardineer ===
Magician

Publication information
- Publisher: Marvel Comics
- First appearance: Tales to Astonish #56 (June 1964)
- Created by: Stan Lee; Dick Ayers

In-story information
- Alter ego: Lee Guardineer
- Species: Human
- Abilities: Skilled stage magician, trickster and illusionist Master pickpocket Expert animal trainer Hypnosis; Use of motorized cane

Lee Guardineer is a stage magician who uses his stage acts to rob rich party guests. His activities attract the attention of Giant-Man's ants, who report his crimes. The Magician then robs a yacht party run by socialite Sterling Stuyvesant and kidnaps Wasp to make Giant-Man jealous. In response, Giant-Man sets up a phony yacht party which lures Magician into a trap. Once the trap is sprung, Giant-Man captures Magician and saves Wasp. The Magician is fished out of the water by the police and later taken to prison.

While Hank Pym is out of town, the Magician escapes from prison and sets up a clothing store with Wasp-inspired clothing. When Wasp arrives, the Magician attacks and captures her. However, Wasp makes short work of the Magician, who is promptly arrested.

Sometime later, Lee is released from prison and moves to Tampa with a dancer named Chasity, with whom he has a son.

=== Son of Lee Guardineer ===
Magician

Publication information
- Publisher: Marvel Comics
- First appearance: The Astonishing Ant-Man #2 (January 2016)
- Created by: Nick Spencer; Ramon Rosanas

In-story information
- Species: Human
- Abilities: Skilled stage magician, trickster and illusionist

Lee Guardineer has an unnamed son who took up the Magician mantle. Upon taking his father's mantle, Magician joined the Power Broker's Hench App, a mobile app that enables people to solicit the service of supervillains. His first job has him hired by publicist Marlena Howard to pretend to have a grudge against Darla Deering for not hiring him for the opening act of the woman's show. The Magician interrupts Darla in the middle of her break-up fight against Ant-Man (Scott Lang) and confronts the two heroes with genetically modified rabbits and pigeons. After explaining his origin to Ant-Man, the Magician intentionally loses to Miss Thing. Their fight is staged and filmed because it would make a successful pilot episode for Darla's newest reality show.

== Powers and abilities ==
The Lee Guardineer version of Magician is a skilled stage magician, trickster, and illusionist whose tricks rely on his technology. Besides being a master pickpocket, he is an expert animal trainer and can hypnotize anyone at will. The Magician has a motorized cane with a hatch on top that can act as a vacuum and be used as a divining rod to seek out his enemies.

== Other versions ==
=== Ultimate Marvel ===
Magician
- Magician (Elliot Boggs) in Ultimate X-Men #70. Art by Ben Oliver.

Publication information
- Publisher: Marvel Comics
- First appearance: Ultimate X-Men #66 (March 2006)
- Created by: Robert Kirkman & Tom Raney

In-story information
- Alter ego: Elliot Boggs
- Species: Human mutant
- Team affiliations: Ultimate X-Men
- Abilities: Reality warping

The Ultimate Marvel version of Magician is Elliot Boggs. His powers first emerged uncontrollably, apparently killing both of his parents. After being subdued by S.H.I.E.L.D., custody of him is given over to Charles Xavier in the hopes Elliot can control his powers. When Elliot awakes, he quickly urges Cyclops to let him join the X-Men. Shorthanded, Cyclops allows Elliot to help the X-Men take on the Brotherhood of Mutant Supremacy attacking the Academy of Tomorrow. During the battle, Elliot manages to easily defeat the Blob. Afterwards, he adopts the Magician code name, which is suggested by television reporters. Several of the X-Men observe that the reporters got to the scene amazingly fast and that the Brotherhood had no reason for the initial attack in the first place. After Elliot's interview, the X-Men are on good terms with the press for the first time since Magneto returned after his apparent death.

Later during an attack by the Friends of Humanity on a hospital that gave treatments to mutants, Elliot once again fights alongside the X-Men and manages to single-handedly defeat the Friends of Humanity when the other X-Men are incapacitated. Before the X-Men return to the mansion, Nick Fury visits Xavier, requesting that Elliot join the Ultimates. However, Xavier refuses, to which Fury says Elliot's parents have agreed to their son joining the Ultimates. Xavier is shocked to hear this, as Elliot's parents were believed to have died. When Fury is unable to recall saying or doing this and only heard of Elliot when he started appearing with the X-Men, Xavier realizes something is very wrong.

Xavier and Fury believe that Elliot has been messing with their minds, creating the illusion of Fury bringing him to Xavier. Fury states that even if Elliot had made everyone forget, there would still be a record on file at S.H.I.E.L.D. The two await Elliott's arrival to confront him. When the jet lands, Xavier asks Elliot to "come clean". Xavier confronts him with the truth that his parents are not dead and that Fury never took him to the mansion. When everyone begins attacking him, Elliot tries to make everyone all stop and forget why they are attacking him, but this tactic fails to work completely thanks to Xavier's interference. Elliot decides he is through playing games and that he could have made the X-Men popular but now he has to kill everyone. However, Elliot is unaware of Jean Grey's presence much to Elliot's surprise.

A battle ensues, in which Magician once again summons the Brotherhood of Mutant Supremacy out of thin air. Magician binds the X-Men in metal and Jean fights the entire Brotherhood alone. Jean speaks psychically to Wolverine and obtains permission to burn away the metal binding him. As the battle progresses, Wolverine slowly heals and apparently kills Magician, making him and everything that he affected disappear. Magician is later revealed to have survived, but chose to isolate himself, wanting to be left alone.

=== Powers and abilities ===
Elliot Boggs is a mutant capable of warping reality to his whim. He has little control of his powers, stating that they seem to give him whatever he wants regardless of what he wills them to.
