= Ultimate War =

2002–03 Marvel Comics comic book series

- Cover of Ultimate War #1 (February 2003). Art by Chris Bachalo.

Publication information
- Publisher: Marvel Comics
- Schedule: Monthly
- Format: Limited series
- Publication date: December 2002 – February 2003
- No. of issues: 4
- Main character(s): X-Men; Ultimates; Magneto; Brotherhood of Mutants

Creative team
- Written by: Mark Millar
- Artist: Chris Bachalo

Ultimate War is a comic book limited series produced by Marvel Comics featuring the Ultimates and the Ultimate X-Men. The series contains four books, released between December 8, 2002 and February 23, 2003. It was written by Scottish comics author Mark Millar with art by Chris Bachalo.

It is collected as part of the Ultimate X-Men series of trade paperbacks. This was the first time the Ultimates as a team had crossed over with characters from the Ultimate Marvel Universe.

== Plot ==
Previously, the X-Men defeated Magneto and pronounced him dead. Rather than turning Magneto over to the authorities and virtually ensuring the death penalty for him, Professor X secretly brainwashed his old friend and tried to rehabilitate him. However, Beast inadvertently leaked this plan to Magneto's Brotherhood, believing that he was chatting with an online girlfriend. The Brotherhood used this to entrap Beast and gained enough knowledge to free their leader.

Meanwhile, Iceman has left the X-Men, forced out by his worried parents after he sustained injuries in the fight against Proteus, while three more X-Men, Wolverine, Cyclops, and Kitty Pryde, are on a mission to the Savage Land.

The US government is irate over Magneto's reappearance and demands explanations from Nick Fury. Fury and his Ultimates track down the Xavier Mansion, whose location was hitherto unknown, and find it empty, the X-Men having relocated. Nick Fury comes to the incorrect conclusion that the X-Men have allied with Magneto to fight mankind.

In preparing to battle the X-Men, Captain America reveals he knows more about Wolverine; they fought together in World War II, when Logan went under the name James "Lucky Jim" Howlett. The X-Men's plane returns, with only Logan and Kitty on board. Wolverine claims Cyclops has died heroically in the Savage Land. The truth, which Jean later learns, is that Wolverine tried to kill Cyclops and left him for dead so as to be with Jean.

Charles Xavier meets with Magneto to negotiate a truce, intending to use the meeting as a diversion to allow Wolverine to track down Magneto's base. Magneto anticipates Xavier's double-cross, tracks down the X-Men's new base in turn, and anonymously tips off their whereabouts to the Ultimates. The Ultimates track down the X-Men and have an all-out fight.

The Ultimates nearly defeat the X-Men, who are only saved by the timely return of Iceman. All of the X-Men escape except Xavier, who stays behind to delay the Ultimates and is captured by Nick Fury.
