= Jimmy Hudson =

- Jimmy Hudson on the variant cover of Ultimate Comics: X #1 (March 2010). Art by Arthur Adams.

Publication information
- Publisher: Marvel Comics
- First appearance: Ultimate Comics: X #1 (February 2010)
- Created by: Jeph Loeb; Art Adams

In-story information
- Species: Human mutant
- Place of origin: Port St. Lucie, Florida, United States (Earth-1610)
- Team affiliations: Ultimate X-Men; Ultimate X Kitty Pryde's Mutant Resistance; Time-displaced X-Men; X-Men Blue
- Notable aliases: Wolverine Jr., Wolverine, Poison
- Abilities: Regenerative healing factor; Superhuman senses, strength, agility, stamina, reflexes and longevity; Organic steel-laced skeletal structure with retractable claws; Skilled martial artist and master hand-to-hand combatant

Poison / Wolverine (Jimmy Hudson) is a character appearing in American comic books published by Marvel Comics. The character appears in the Ultimate Marvel universe and is the son of his universe's Wolverine. After the 2015 Secret Wars event, he was transferred to the Marvel Prime Universe.

== Publication history ==
Jimmy Hudson first appeared in Ultimate Comics: X #1 (February 2010) by writer Jeph Loeb and artist Art Adams, a story that was published in the aftermath of the 2009 storyline "Ultimatum". Cullen Bunn opted to explore Jimmy Hudson's past; he enjoyed the idea of a Wolverine that was raised in a positive environment, and aspects of the character's situation resonated with him to his own adopted son who was abandoned at birth.

Following the "Secret Wars" storyline, Hudson was among the characters moved to the mainstream Marvel Universe, which resulted in his joining the time-displaced members of the X-Men. Writer Cullen Bunn used him in both that comic and Venom, including the Venomized crossover where he was redesigned as "Poison". After some years without being used by later writers, he reappears in the Deadpool tie-in of the "Venom War" storyline, and is arrested by the Time Variance Authority. This leads to his appearance in the 2024 TVA comic.

== Fictional character biography ==
In the Ultimate Marvel universe, James Howlett was assigned to a S.H.I.E.L.D. covert team to retrieve Mothervine, a serum developed to accelerate mutation. However, Wolverine is confronted by Magda Lensherr, a freelance spy who was hired by an unknown party to steal the formula. Lensherr injects herself with Mothervine before having sex with Wolverine, resulting in her becoming pregnant with his child. After giving birth to a son named Jimmy, Lensherr entrusts him to Wolverine before disappearing. At Wolverine's insistence, James Hudson and his wife Heather adopt Jimmy and raise him as their own. Many years later, after the "Ultimatum" event and the death of Wolverine, the U.S. government establishes strong anti-mutant procedures. Mutants across the nation were arrested on sight and killed if they resisted. Jimmy's mutant powers activate when he was badly injured in a drag race, resulting in him being shunned by his human girlfriend. Afterward, he meets former X-Man Kitty Pryde when she arrives at his house and hands him a box of personal items belonging to his real father Wolverine, along with a final message from Logan informing his son that he loves him and never regretted having him. With this revelation, Jimmy sought out another former X-Man, Jean Grey, who was in hiding since the Ultimatum Wave. The two of them together begin recruiting mutants Derek Morgan and Liz Allan, and later the Hulk, forming Ultimate-X, under the covert supervision of Nick Fury.

After Valerie Cooper reveals to the world the true origins of mutants, proclaiming the first mutant to be Wolverine, an angry Jimmy leaves the team to seek answers for himself. However, he is captured by the Purifiers, an anti-mutant faction led by William Stryker Jr. Jimmy manages to escape and meets up with Kitty Pryde, Iceman, Human Torch, and Rogue. The five of them together decide to stop Stryker from hunting and killing mutants. Kitty manages to kill Stryker, who is revealed to have been a mutant with the ability to communicate with and control machines. Before he dies, Stryker commands a fleet of Nimrod Sentinels to hunt down and kill every mutant in the United States. After the Nimrods are defeated, the United States government allows mutants to either be cured of their mutation or move to a sovereign land called Utopia. Jimmy is among the twenty remaining mutants who refuse the cure.

After the multiverse is destroyed and reconstructed during the events of "Secret Wars", Jimmy and several other mutants end up in Earth-616. They are captured and experimented on by Miss Sinister, resulting in Jimmy suffering amnesia. Miss Sinister succeeds in brainwashing the rest of the mutants into her team of enforcers called the New Marauders. Jimmy escapes from Sinister into the wilderness of Colorado. Jimmy is found by the young, time-displaced X-Men, who recruit him into their team.

During the "Secret Empire" storyline, the team rebels against the government of New Tian following Hydra's takeover of the United States. While in their hideout, they are attacked by a group of mutants sent by Emma Frost. The team is captured. However, Jean Grey and Jimmy are able to escape and regroup in order to plan their next move. They are rescued by Danger, who distracts Frost's forces with holograms. The team begins losing hope when Frost begins telepathically tormenting Cyclops. Havok is about to intercept Grey and Jimmy when he is suddenly ambushed by Polaris. Grey manages to release Cyclops from Frost's mental control and the team successfully escapes.

During the Poison Hive's inter-dimensional invasion of Earth, Jimmy is one of several superhumans who are forcefully bound to Symbiotes. After Jean Grey destroys the Poisons, the Poison possessing Jimmy remains in control of his body. Jimmy's former teammates in the X-Men manage to track him down in hopes of saving him. However, they are interrupted by Jimmy's half-brother Daken, who has been sent by Magneto to kill him. The Poison attempts to flee after being forced into a fight with Daken, which resulted in a brutal yet equal fight between them before being stopped by the Blue Team. Jimmy regains control of his body, but chooses to leave the X-Men until he finds his place in the world.

In order to defeat Enigma, Jean Grey unleashes the Phoenix Force's full power, connecting to every mutant from X-Men's past, present, and future. Among the mutants she connects with is Jimmy Hudson, who was absent during the establishment of the nation of Krakoa, Wolverine's resurrection, and several other events.

During the "Venom War" storyline, it is revealed that Jimmy has gone to live in the underground city of Monster Metropolis, believing himself to be a monster. When Zombiotes attack Manhattan, Deadpool travels to Monster Metropolis, seeking Jimmy's help against the horde of symbiotes. After successfully taking out the Zombiotes, the group take the fight to the surface after Deadpool convinces the Legion of Monsters to help. In the heat of battle, Jimmy's own hatred for himself as a monster makes him go on a berserk rampage against friend and foe alike, needing to be restrained by his allies before he can attack civilians. Jimmy eventually calms down and continues to fight, saving the people of Manhattan. The Time Variance Authority arrive to arrest Jimmy, as he is from another universe.

== Powers and abilities ==
Jimmy's mutant powers are similar to those of his father, Wolverine. For instance, he possesses an accelerating healing factor that allows him to regenerate damaged or destroyed tissue in a relatively brief period of time. While the full extent of his healing factor is unknown, it is possible Jimmy can withstand various wounds, diseases, drugs, and toxins. In addition, his healing factor makes him extremely resistant to psychic attacks.

Jimmy has retractable bone claws in his forearms. Although he lacks his father's adamantium-laced skeleton and claws, he has the ability to coat his claws in organic steel.

During the Poison's multiverse invasion of Earth, Jimmy was assimilated by one of the creatures, but seems to have gained control over it as a result of the Hive Queen's death. Jimmy's Poison greatly boosted his natural mutant abilities while possessing other abilities such as wall-crawling, organic webbing generation, and shapeshifting.

== Other versions ==
An alternate universe version of Jimmy Hudson from the Battleworld domain of the Kingdom of Manhattan appears in "Secret Wars".
