= Ultimate X-Men =

Comic book series

- Cover art for Ultimate X-Men #65, by Stuart Immonen.

Publication information
- Publisher: Marvel Comics
- Schedule: Monthly
- Publication date: February 2001 – February 2009
- No. of issues: 101
- Main characters: List: Angel; Beast; Colossus; Cyclops; Dazzler; Iceman; Jean Grey; Nightcrawler; Professor X; Betsy Braddock; Rogue; Kitty Pryde; Storm; Wolverine

Creative team
- Created by: List: Bill Jemas Joe Quesada Mark Millar Adam Kubert Andy Kubert (based upon the original characters by Stan Lee, Chris Claremont and Jack Kirby)
- Written by: List: Mark Millar (#1–12, 15–33, Ultimate War #1–4) Chuck Austen (#13–14) Geoff Johns (#1/2) Brian Michael Bendis (#34–45) Brian K. Vaughan (#46–65, Annual #1) Mike Carey (Ultimate X4 #1–2) Robert Kirkman (#66–93, Annual #2) Aron Eli Coleite (#94–100, X-Men/FF Annual #1–2, Ultimate Requiem)
- Penciller: List: Adam Kubert (#1–4, 7–8, 10–12, 15–17, 20–22, 25, 29, 31–33) Andy Kubert (#5–6, 50–53) Tom Raney (#9, 66–68, 72–74, Annual #1) Tom Derenick (#12) Esad Ribić (#13–14) Aaron Lopresti (#1/2) Chris Bachalo (#18–19, Ultimate War #1–4) Kaare Andrews (#23–24) Ben and Ray Lai (#26) David Finch (#27–28, 30, 34–45) Brandon Peterson (#46–49, X-Men/FF Annual #2) Stuart Immonen (#54–57, 59–65) Steve Dillon (#58) Pasqual Ferry (Ultimate X4 #1–2) Leinil Francis Yu (Ultimate X4 #2) Ben Oliver (#69–71, 75–76, 78, 81, Ultimate Requiem) Salvador Larroca (Annual #2, 88–92) Yanick Paquette (#77, 79–80, 84–88) Pascal Alixe (#82–83) Harvey Tolibao (#93) Mark Brooks (#94–100, X-Men/FF Annual #1)

Ultimate X-Men is a superhero American comic book series, which was published by Marvel Comics, from 2001 to 2009. The series is a modernized re-imagining of Marvel's long-running X-Men comic book franchise as part of the Ultimate Marvel imprint. The Ultimate X-Men exist alongside other revamped Marvel characters in Ultimate Marvel titles including Ultimate Spider-Man, Ultimate Fantastic Four, and The Ultimates.

The protagonists are the X-Men, a group of teen-aged mutants: a subspecies of the human race, who possess latent super-human abilities from birth, due to the presence of the mysterious "X-Gene" within their genetic codes. It sets them apart from the rest of humanity and despite being feared and distrusted by the general public and authorities, they use their super-powers to prevent and stop unnatural threats to both the human and mutant race, while being mentored by Professor Charles Xavier, the X-Men's founder and a world-renowned expert on genetics and the world's most powerful telepath. The series features many characters and storylines similar to those of the original X-Men series. Ultimate X-Men almost completely ignores supernatural or mystical elements as plot devices, and the X-Men have no secret identities, and mutants are distrusted and hunted down.

The series began in 2001 under writer Mark Millar and artists Adam Kubert and Andy Kubert, while the final issues of the series were written by Aron Coleite and penciled by Mark Brooks. Ultimate X-Men was met with considerable commercial success, even outselling most of the other X-Men comic titles and received a generally positive response from critics and readers, who praised the art-work by various artists, the writing runs of Millar, Bendis, Vaughan, Kirkman and Coleite, the character development and progression of the titular superheroes throughout the series and the unique and interesting twists on conventional X-Men themes and concepts, along with the fresh and distinctively modernized re-imagining of the classic X-Men mythos, while the uneven quality of the writing, the somewhat edgy and unnecessarily adult-oriented tone and direction of the comics and some of the changes and deviations from the original X-Men comics were singled out for criticism.

A quasi-sequel/spinoff titled Ultimate Comics: X began in February 2010, but only lasted for 5 issues. The series focused on Wolverine's secret son Jimmy Hudson, Jean Grey, and several other mutants dealing with the aftermath of Ultimatum.

Ultimate X-Men was later relaunched by Nick Spencer and Paco Medina, with the title now called Ultimate Comics: X-Men.

== Publishing history ==
First issue of Ultimate X-Men. Cover by Adam Kubert.

Upon its debut in February 2001, Ultimate X-Men was the second comic of the Ultimate Marvel line, preceded a few months by its sister title Ultimate Spider-Man. The heads of the Ultimate Universe line, Bill Jemas and Joe Quesada, originally tried to hire Brian Michael Bendis to write the title, but he declined. Marvel hired Scottish writer Mark Millar, who was best known at the time for his run on The Authority and was largely ignorant of the X-Men franchise. With the 2000 X-Men film as his only reference, Millar reinvented the X-Men. As a result, Millar's original X-Men consisted of telepath Professor X, Cyclops, whose eyes shoot concussive beams, telepathic and telekinetic Jean Grey, weather-manipulating Storm, simian genius Beast, metal-skinned Colossus, and cryokinetic Iceman. Millar's roster soon expanded to include teleporting Nightcrawler, intangible Kitty Pryde and power absorbing Rogue.

Common to the Millar period was an edgy tone, featuring quick action-driven plots and less moral X-Men. For instance, Wolverine tries to kill Cyclops in "Return of the King" because he is envious of Jean's love. In an interview with Sequential Tart, Millar commented, "You're not competing with Cartoon Network on these books; you're competing with 'Buffy'...Superhero comics aren't adult, but they shouldn't be written for five-year-olds either." Millar shaped Ultimate X-Men into a commercial hit, consistently outselling its sister titles, X-Treme X-Men and Uncanny X-Men.

After Mark Millar's run, Ultimate Spider-Man writer Brian Michael Bendis took over for a year. Bendis stated that his run on the book would be more character-driven, especially concerning Wolverine, who had previously tried to kill his teammate Cyclops. Bendis' run was marked by the introductions of Angel and Dazzler to the team, relative absence of major villains, and the apparent death of Beast in a Sentinel attack. As a side note, Ultimate X-Men #40 features what Marvel claims to be the first marriage proposal in a comic book letters column, which is answered in Ultimate X-Men #44 with a positive response.

The third Ultimate X-Men writer was Brian K. Vaughan, best known at the time for his work on Y: The Last Man, and, subsequently, Saga. His run was marked by the relative absence of Wolverine as the main character and the re-imagining of second-string X-Men characters. He introduced Mr. Sinister as a mutant-killing scientist with hypnosis and stealth powers in "The Tempest" (#46–49), German twins Fenris as mutant corporate criminals in "Cry Wolf" (#50–53), as well as Mojo and Longshot as a corrupt TV producer and a mutant felon, respectively in "The Most Dangerous Game" (#54–57). Both are of non-alien origin in this world and have the civilian names Arthur Centino and Mojo Adams, a play on the names of their creators, writer Ann Nocenti and artist Art Adams. Further arcs were centered on Professor X (#58) and Deathstrike in "Shock and Awe" (#59–60). Lady Deathstrike possesses adamantium claws and regenerative powers. Vaughan also reintroduced Magneto, and established Colossus to be homosexual.

On working within the Ultimate Universe, Vaughan wrote: "In my mind, the X-Men shouldn't be teachers or celebrities or even traditional superheroes. They're students, confused, sometimes reckless teenagers who are feared and hated because their bodies are undergoing frightening changes... The Ultimate Universe restores that small but crucial element."

Vaughan's run was followed by Robert Kirkman, author of The Walking Dead and Invincible comic books. Kirkman's run was noted for adapting several major storyarcs from the regular X-Men series. These included Jean Grey's transformation into Phoenix and the introduction of Cable, Bishop, and Apocalypse. Kirkman reintroduced Wolverine as an important character, and played with issues of team loyalty. Under his authorship, major characters such as Nightcrawler and Colossus left the team. His tenure also featured Cyclops' decision to turn Xavier's into a more traditional school and consequently disband the X-Men. When this was done an alternate team of X-Men was formed by Bishop as part of the upcoming fight against Apocalypse. After the Ultimatum storyline, nearly all of the X-Men were killed, and the team disbanded.

After the events in Ultimatum the book, along with Ultimate Fantastic Four, was canceled after its 100th issue. A follow-up one-shot, called Requiem, was released and concluded the series' story. A new series, Ultimate Comics: X, debuted in early 2010 and featured Kitty Pryde, Wolverine's son Jimmy Hudson, and Jean Grey.

Ultimate X-Men was then relaunched as Ultimate Comics: X-Men with writer Nick Spencer and artist Paco Medina. The series stars Jimmy Hudson, Kitty Pryde, Johnny Storm, Iceman, and Rogue.

=== Commercial success ===
Ultimate X-Men quickly established itself as a hit comic, lauded by critics and popular with the fans. The following table shows the development of comic sales in comparison to the mainstream titles.

Date	Ultimate X-Men	Uncanny X-Men	New X-Men	X-Treme X-Men
March 2001	97,985	96,271	n/a	n/a
November 2001	100,688	125,044 (400th issue)	116,782	84,326
March 2002	96,150	95,386	104,138	72,892
November 2002	89,390	83,581	97,023	55,043
March 2003	86,795	83,626	92,618	58,322
November 2003	105,737	90,764	102,591	61,574
March 2004	97,002	86,431	117,253	53,207
November 2004	92,133	92,051	(ended)	(ended)
March 2005	83,835	86,365	(ended)	(ended)
November 2005	74,264	82,825	(ended)	(ended)
March 2006	72,765	79,789	(ended)	(ended)

== Characters ==
=== X-Men ===
- Professor Charles Xavier, telepath and telekinetic, is the founder and patron of the X-Men. He is an idealist and a pacifist, but less saintly than his mainstream counterpart. The Professor possesses vast knowledge and acquires advanced surgical skills he gleans from reading surgeons' minds (The Tomorrow People). He is the ex-husband of Moira MacTaggert with whom he worked to help mutants, devising new therapies and surgical techniques for their unique patients, and had a son named David. He suffered a spinal injury at the hands of his old friend, Magneto during an escape from his increasingly militaristic island society, the Savage Land, an injury that left him a paraplegic and ultimately a wheelchair user. He has a business relationship with the mysterious Lilandra, the majestrix of the pagan Shi'ar cult. After Jean Grey is kidnapped by the time-traveling Cable, Professor Xavier reveals to Cyclops that he is in love with her. Professor X is seemingly killed when he dives to protect Cyclops from a bomb that Cable detonates. It is subsequently revealed that he did not die, but was transported to Cable's future. He is however murdered by Magneto during the Ultimatum miniseries.
- Angel, Warren Worthington III, is a handsome, shy, and winged mutant. He is Dazzler's boyfriend before she is put into a coma. He has been "expelled" from the X-Men; in reality, he is spying for Xavier. Without Bishop's consent, Dazzler has recruited him to be a part of the new X-Men. Angel is later killed by Sinister as part of Apocalypse's resurrection, but is restored to life by the Phoenix. He is later killed again by Sabretooth during the Ultimatum storyline.
- Beast, simian mutant and genius Henry "Hank" McCoy, is turned into a blue, furry beast by the Weapon X project. He serves as the team's elite engineer, upgrading the Blackbird and Danger Room sequences. When chatting online to the Blob (pretending to be an interested girl), he accidentally reveals Magneto survived Xavier's earlier attack. He has a troubled romance with Storm, until he is killed in a Sentinel attack. It is later revealed that Hank survived and had been secretly working for S.H.I.E.L.D. on the Legacy Virus, until he escapes to return to the X-Men and Storm. Beast eventually dies in the Ultimatum wave.
- Colossus, Piotr "Peter" Rasputin, can turn into organic steel and reluctantly works as an arms smuggler before joining the X-Men. Colossus can transmute his entire body into organic steel, which gives him invulnerability and superhuman strength.
- Cyclops, Scott Summers, whose eyes emit concussive blasts, is the boy scout-like X-Men field leader. Initially shy and aloof, he learns to be an unrivaled leader and pursue his interests, notably the love of Jean Grey, an interest that has often puts him at odds with his teammate Wolverine. He revisits his dead parents in a dream world he calls "Corsair". After the "death" of Xavier, Cyclops disbands the X-Men to utilize the school as a safe haven and educational center for mutants. He is assassinated by Quicksilver at the end of the Ultimatum event.
- Dazzler, Allison "Ali" Blaire, is a tough-as-nails rock singer with photovoltaic powers who is heavily pierced and tattooed and wears slashed clothing. She becomes Angel's girlfriend after he takes the blame for something she does. She is stabbed and put into a coma by Storm's old mentor Lady Deathstrike. During her recovery, Nightcrawler develops an obsessive crush on her, eventually culminating in him kidnapping her when she awakes. She leaves the team in disgust when Xavier tries to rehabilitate him. Bishop later recruits Dazzler as a member of his new X-Men team. She dies in the Ultimatum wave.
- Iceman, Robert "Bobby" Drake, is a hot-headed youth with cold-based powers, who is in the throes of puberty but loyal to the X-Men's cause. He is very fickle, pursuing girls then losing interest and back to being interested again. He has a fear of Magneto and is often seen eating or playing video games. Recently, he rekindled his relationship with Rogue when her absorbing powers were halted after she absorbed Gambit's powers for an extended period of time.
- Marvel Girl (Jean Grey) has telepathic and telekinetic powers. She is outgoing, witty and scathingly sarcastic, but can also be a very responsible young woman and is the unofficial second-in-command behind Cyclops. After an affair with Wolverine, she begins a steady relationship with Cyclops. The Shi'ar religion believes Jean to be the host of the Phoenix Force, their supposed god. Jean becomes the headmistress of the school, alongside Scott, after Xavier supposedly dies. When the X-Men battle Apocalypse, she merges with the Phoenix and destroys him with her god-like abilities and restarts time so this event will not happen. She leaves the team but returns promptly, to the surprise of the others.
- Nightcrawler (Kurt Wagner) is a former Weapon X prisoner. He has a crush on Dazzler and is resentful that she chose Angel instead of him. Despite his own struggles with being rejected for being different, he is uncomfortable with Colossus' homosexuality and shuns him as a friend. He was being kept sedated after a failed attempt to kidnap Dazzler, but eventually escaped after Xavier's "death". Nightcrawler would go on to not only join the Morlocks, but become their chosen leader. He is later killed in the Ultimatum wave.
- Psylocke (Betsy Braddock) is a telepath who started off as a corporal for S.T.R.I.K.E., the British division of S.H.I.E.L.D. During an encounter with Xavier's reality-warping son David, her body was possessed and destroyed. Betsy transferred her mind into the body of a comatose Japanese girl named Kwannon. As Kwannon was a minor, Betsy was too young to serve as a government agent so she brought her formidable psychic abilities to the X-Men, reuniting with them for the first time since the destruction of her original body. Taking the codename Psylocke, she not only retained her telepathy but also learned to channel it into a psychic knife capable of cutting through any material.
- Rogue originally drains life-force and memories on skin contact. She is abducted into the Weapon X program under unknown circumstances. Like her mainstream counterpart, she can absorb mutant powers. When she is liberated, she first joins the Brotherhood of Mutant Supremacy, then defects to the X-Men, then leaves the team in the company of Gambit after her boyfriend Bobby Drake cheats on her with Kitty Pryde. After absorbing his powers, which last for an extended period of time, during a battle with Juggernaut (in which Gambit dies), she inherits his energy-charging powers. This negates her absorbing power and she becomes able to touch people without draining their abilities or memories as shown when she and her ex-boyfriend, Iceman, have sex in the "Date Night" arc. These powers have since faded, leaving her with her previous absorbing powers.
- Shadowcat, Kitty Pryde, can walk through walls. She is a young, but dedicated girl. Like her mainstream counterpart, her devotion to her Jewish faith is evidenced by her ever-present Star of David. In Ultimate Spider-Man Annual #1 she begins dating Peter Parker, better known as Spider-Man. She left the team to live with her mother in Queens, where she is now enrolled in Peter Parker's high school. Her relationship with Peter has ended, however, and she has shown an interest in dating Peter's classmate Kenny "Kong" McFarlane.
- Storm, Ororo Munroe, like the phenomena from which she takes her name, has a unique mutant ability which allows her to harness and manipulate forces of nature. Calling upon the elements she can manifest violent storms, summon lightning from a benign sky, create blizzards instantly and even whip up winds to bear herself aloft. A streetwise car thief who hails from Morocco, Ororo's sharp wit and cynicism can make her come off as arrogant, but, with that arrogance comes a near-unparalleled sense of level-headedness that allows her to temper as the voice of reason among the X-Men. Between the purported death of her boyfriend Beast, her fleeting relationships with Wolverine, and her role as second-in-command of Bishop's X-Men, Ororo's confidence has continued to grow, as has her skill with her mutant abilities.
- Wolverine, James "Logan" Howlett, has animal instincts and extreme regeneration powers. He is turned into an amnesiac, emotionless killer by Weapon X. Wolverine resurfaces as the cold-blooded elite assassin of Magneto and infiltrates the X-Men to kill Professor X. He betrays Magneto, however, and joins the X-Men after coming to understand and believe in Xavier's cause. Over the course of the series in between attacks by former members of Weapon X, Wolverine has searched for answers regarding his long-forgotten past. He is killed by Magneto near the end of the Ultimatum series.

=== Villains and supporting cast ===
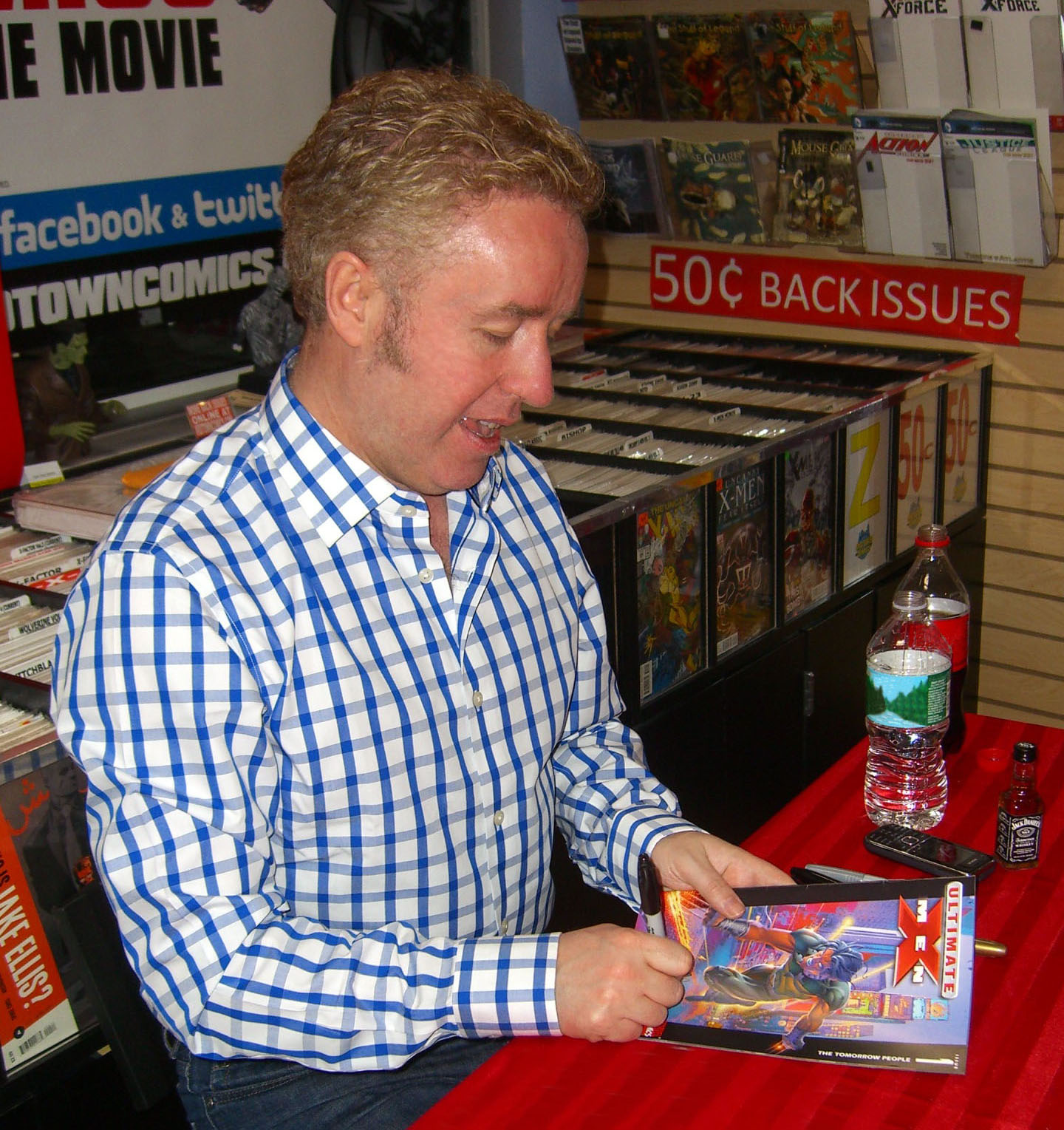
Writer Mark Millar signing a copy of the first issue during an appearance at Midtown Comics in Manhattan.

Ultimate X-Men introduced revised versions of classic X-Men villains, such as mutant supremacist, would-be world conqueror, and evil genius mastermind Magneto. He heads the anti-human and genetic terrorist group Brotherhood of Mutant Supremacy. The series also features the amoral, Josef Mengele-like mutant super-weapon project Weapon X, the shady Hellfire Club and many more.

In addition, the Academy of Tomorrow is the Ultimate Marvel version of a spin-off X-Men team called the New Mutants. In this world, the group consists of: headmistress Emma Frost, who can turn her skin into organic diamond; Cyclops' older brother Havok (Alex Summers), who shoots concussive blasts from his hands; airborne Sam Guthrie, or Cannonball; mutant genius Doug Ramsey, also known as Cypher; Canadian speedster Jean-Paul Beaubier, or Northstar; Havok's girlfriend, Lorna Dane, the magnekinetic Polaris; Roberto da Costa, the Brazilian solar-powered Sunspot; and recently Angel. The Shi'ar are a religious movement, led by "Majestrix Lilandra". They worship the "Phoenix God", which they think is reincarnated in the X-Man Marvel Girl (Jean Grey).

The Ultimate version of Cable is revealed to be a future version of Wolverine, who kidnaps Charles Xavier in an attempt to prevent the coming of Apocalypse.

"Syndicate" is the name of two mutants, psi-resistant conjoined twins named Luke and Matthew. They try to rob a bank to help their terminally ill sister, but are stopped by Professor X. Realizing their plight, he gives them a chance to redeem themselves by working as his private agents. Created by Brian K. Vaughan and Steve Dillon, they first appeared in Ultimate X-Men #58. The characters have an unusual heart which pumps out electromagnetic pulses with each beat; this disables almost any electrical system. Their interlinked brain matter also makes them immune to telepathic control, although they are still susceptible to mind readings.

The X-Men have more than once crossed the paths of other superheroes: Peter Parker is a good friend of the X-Men and is Shadowcat's ex-boyfriend. The X-Men share a wary truce with Nick Fury and the Ultimates, who have been both their benefactors ("New Mutants" arc) and adversaries (Ultimate War) in the past. The Fantastic Four have met the X-Men in Ultimate X4 and the teams are generally on positive terms.

=== Settings ===
- The X-Men live in the X-Mansion in Westchester, New York. Its location was a secret at first, but is now known to the world. It contains the Danger Room, a virtual reality dome in which the X-Men can fight against hard-light holographic enemies. It has been used several times for in-jokes and popular culture references. Once, the junior X-Men fought the Brood, and for recreation, Nightcrawler simulated scenes similar to Pirates of the Caribbean and The Lord of the Rings.
- Genosha is an apartheid state in which mutants are discriminated against. Krakoa is an island not far off Genosha, where Mojo Adams' Hunt for Justice reality show is held.
- Muir Island is an island in the north of Scotland and the location of Dr. Moira MacTaggert's lab.

== In other media ==
The two incarnations of Wolverine, from X-Men: Evolution. On the left his look in seasons 1 and 2, inspired by his look at the beginning of the traditional X-Men comics, on the right his look in seasons 3 and 4, inspired by his later look in the Ultimate X-Men comic.

- In the video games X-Men Legends and X-Men Legends II: Rise of Apocalypse, the characteristic tight black-and-golden costumes of Ultimate X-Men are the default outfits of the X-Men. The traditional costumes can be unlocked as throwbacks after the player has unlocked them by completing acts within the game. Additionally, many of the other characters have their Ultimate costumes as their default outfit. Characters in these games who had not yet appeared in Ultimate X-Men at the time that the games were released either appear wearing their Earth-616 ('classic') costumes or appear in a new costume that is in the same black-and-gold style as the Ultimate X-Men suits.
- In X-Men: Evolution, Wolverine sports his Ultimate X-Men appearance from the third season onwards. In the final episode "Ascension", future adult versions of the X-Men are seen, who sport dark costumes reminiscent of Ultimate X-Men.
- In the final arc of Wolverine and the X-Men, a fleet of Sentinels are sent to Genosha to attack Magneto and the mutants living there. However, like in The Tomorrow People, Magneto disassembles all of the Sentinels, reprogramming them to attack humans. He then launches an attack upon New York.
- Ultimate X-Men Vol. 1: The Tomorrow People appears in nine parts as an unlockable in Marvel Nemesis: Rise of the Imperfects. Each part is unlocked after completing a specific bonus level.
- Wolverine and Bolivar Trask appear as bosses in the video game Ultimate Spider-Man.
- Ultimate costumes of Wolverine, Storm, Colossus, Cyclops, Nightcrawler, Magneto, and Sabretooth appear in the video game Marvel: Ultimate Alliance.

== Collected editions ==
=== Trade Paperbacks ===
#	Title	Material collected	Pages	Released	ISBN
1	The Tomorrow People	Ultimate X-Men #1–6	160	30 Jul 2001	978-0785107880
2	Return To Weapon X	Ultimate X-Men #7–12	144	1 Apr 2002	978-0785108689
3	World Tour	Ultimate X-Men #13–20	192	9 Dec 2002	978-0785109617
4	Hellfire & Brimstone	Ultimate X-Men #21–25	144	3 Mar 2003	978-0785110897
5	Ultimate War	Ultimate War #1–4	112	14 Apr 2003	978-0785111290
6	Return Of The King	Ultimate X-Men #26–33	192	1 Sep 2003	978-0785110910
7	Blockbuster	Ultimate X-Men #34–39	144	22 Mar 2004	978-0785112198
8	New Mutants	Ultimate X-Men #40–45	144	7 Sep 2004	978-0785111610
9	The Tempest	Ultimate X-Men #46–49	112	26 Nov 2004	978-0785114048
10	Cry Wolf	Ultimate X-Men #50–53	96	9 Feb 2005	978-0785114055
11	The Most Dangerous Game	Ultimate X-Men #54–57	104	27 Jul 2005	978-0785116592
12	Hard Lessons	Ultimate X-Men #58–60; Ultimate X-Men Annual #1	120	30 Nov 2005	978-0785118015
13	Magnetic North	Ultimate X-Men #61–65	128	1 Mar 2006	978-0785119067
14:	Phoenix?	Ultimate X-Men #66–71	144	18 Oct 2006	978-0785120193
15	Magical	Ultimate X-Men #72–74; Ultimate X-Men Annual #2	112	17 Jan 2007	978-0785120209
16	Cable	Ultimate X-Men #75–80	160	30 May 2007	978-0785125488
17	Sentinels	Ultimate X-Men #81–88	192	23 Jan 2008	978-0785125495
18	Apocalypse	Ultimate X-Men #89–93	120	30 Jul 2008	978-0785125501
19	Absolute Power	Ultimate X-Men #94–97	112	5 Nov 2008	978-0785129448
	Ultimatum: X-Men/Fantastic Four	Ultimate X-Men #98–100; Ultimate Fantastic Four #58–60	152	23 Dec 2009	978-0785134336

=== Ultimate Collections ===
#	Title	Material collected	Pages	Released	ISBN
1	Ultimate X-Men: Ultimate Collection Book 1	Ultimate X-Men #1–12, ½	336	29 Mar 2006	978-0785121879
2	Ultimate X-Men: Ultimate Collection Book 2	Ultimate X-Men #13–25	336	1 Aug 2007	978-0785128564
3	Ultimate X-Men: Ultimate Collection Book 3	Ultimate War #1–4; Ultimate X-Men #26–33	304	2 Sep 2009	978-0785141877
4	Ultimate X-Men: Ultimate Collection Book 4	Ultimate X-Men #34–45	304	13 Oct 2010	978-0785149231
5	Ultimate X-Men: Ultimate Collection Book 5	Ultimate X-Men #46–57	312	3 Mar 2015	978-0785192923

=== Ultimate Epic Collections ===
#	Title	Material collected	Pages	Released	ISBN
1	The Tomorrow People	Ultimate X-Men #1-12, ½	336	15 Apr 2025	978-1302963019

=== Oversized hardcovers ===
#	Title	Material collected	Pages	Released	ISBN
1	Ultimate X-Men Volume 1 HC	Ultimate X-Men #1–12, Giant-Size X-Men #1	352	7 Aug 2002	978-0785110088
2	Ultimate X-Men Volume 2 HC	Ultimate X-Men #13–25	336	24 Mar 2003	978-0785111306
3	Ultimate X-Men Volume 3 HC	Ultimate X-Men #26–33; Ultimate War #1–4	312	10 Dec 2003	978-0785111313
4	Ultimate X-Men Volume 4 HC	Ultimate X-Men #34–45	304	23 Feb 200	978-0785112518
5	Ultimate X-Men Volume 5 HC	Ultimate X-Men #46–57	296	4 Jan 2006	978-0785121039
6	Ultimate X-Men Volume 6 HC	Ultimate X-Men #58–65, ½; Ultimate X-Men Annual #1	256	30 Aug 2006	978-0785121046
7	Ultimate X-Men Volume 7 HC	Ultimate X-Men #66–74; Ultimate X-Men Annual #2	256	8 Aug 2007	978-0785126058
8	Ultimate X-Men Volume 8 HC	Ultimate X-Men #75–88	352	25 June 2008	978-0785130802
9	Ultimate X-Men Volume 9 HC	Ultimate X-Men #89–97	232	26 Aug 2009	978-0785137795
Premiere Hardcover
	Ultimatum: X-Men/Fantastic Four	Ultimate X-Men #98–100; Ultimate Fantastic Four #58–60	152	20 May 2009	978-0785134329

=== Omnibuses ===
#	Title	Material collected	Pages	Released	ISBN
1	Ultimate X-Men Omnibus Volume 1	Ultimate X-Men #1–33, ½, Ultimate War #1–4	1,024	25 Oct 2022	978-1302946357
2	Ultimate X-Men Omnibus Volume 2	Ultimate X-Men #34–74, Ultimate X-Men Annual #1–2, Ultimate X-Men/Fantastic Four, Ultimate Fantastic Four/X-Men	1,160	13 Feb 2024	978-1302950118
3	Ultimate X-Men Omnibus Volume 3	Ultimate X-Men #75-100, Ultimate Wolverine vs. Hulk #1–6, Ultimate X-Men/Ultimate Fantastic Four Annual, Ultimate Fantastic Four/Ultimate X-Men Annual, Ultimatum #1-5, Ultimatum: X-Men Requiem	1,088	20 Jan 2026	978-1302963620
4	Ultimate X-Men Omnibus Volume 4	Ultimate Comics X #1-5, Ultimate Comics X-Men #1-33, #18.1, Ultimate Comics Wolverine #1-4, Cataclysm: Ultimate X-Men #1-3, Cataclysm: The Ultimates’ Last Stand #3-4, Ultimate Fallout #2-6	1,136	4 Aug 2026	978-1302969394

== See also ==
- List of Ultimate X-Men story arcs
- Ultimate X-Men (2024 comic book), written and illustrated by Peach Momoko and set in the new continuity of Earth-6160
