= Ultimate X: Origins =

- Cover of Ultimate X

Publication information
- Publisher: Ultimate Marvel (Marvel Comics)
- Schedule: Bi-monthly
- Format: Limited series
- Genre: Superhero
- Publication date: February 2010 – June 2011
- No. of issues: 5
- Main character(s): Karen Grant (Jean Grey); Jimmy Hudson; Derek Morgan; Liz Allan

Creative team
- Written by: Jeph Loeb
- Penciller: Art Adams
- Inker: Mark Roslan
- Letterer(s): Albert Deschesne; Richard Starkings
- Colorist: Peter Steigerwald
- Editor(s): Sana Amanat; Mark Paniccia; Joe Quesada

Ultimate X: Origins, also known as Ultimate Comics: X is a limited series from Marvel Comics written by Jeph Loeb with pencils by Art Adams, originally planned as an ongoing bi-monthly series.

The story picks up after the events in Ultimatum and serves as a quasi-sequel/spin-off of Ultimate X-Men. Ultimate X was originally scheduled to be published bi-monthly, alternating months with Loeb's other Ultimate title Ultimate Comics: New Ultimates. However, Ultimate X faced several delays, becoming a prologue to Ultimate Comics: X-Men.

== Characters ==
- Jimmy Hudson: The son of Wolverine, and adopted son of the Hudsons. He has a healing factor and retractable claws, which he is able to cover with organic metal, much like Colossus.
- Karen Grant/Jean Grey: A former member of the X-Men, Jean assumes the name of Karen Grant.
- Derek Morgan: A young mutant from Chicago. He is able to assume a bird-like form which possesses wings, red eyes, and sharp teeth and claws.
- Theodore "Teddy" Allan: Teddy is the son of the Blob and brother of Liz Allan. He inherited his father's powers, such as his voracious appetite and his extremely strong skin and layers of fat.
- Liz Allan/Firestar: Spider-Man's former classmate. She vanished to Southern California after the events of "Ultimatum".
- Hulk/Bruce Banner - Hulk appears in the fifth and final issue of the series.
- Victor Creed/Sabretooth - He has a personal vendetta against Jimmy, and viciously attacks him late at night.

== Collected Edition ==
Title	Material collected	ISBN
Ultimate X: Origins	Ultimate X #1-5	ISBN 0-7851-4014-X
