= Wolverine (Ultimate Marvel character) =

Superhero appearing in Marvel Comics

Publication information
- Publisher: Ultimate Marvel
- First appearance: Ultimate X-Men #1 (February 2001)
- Created by: Mark Millar; Adam Kubert (Based on Wolverine by Roy Thomas; Len Wein; John Romita Sr.)

In-story information
- Alter ego: James "Lucky Jim" Howlett
- Species: Human mutant
- Place of origin: Ultimate Marvel (Earth-1610)
- Team affiliations: Brotherhood of Mutant Supremacy; Ultimate X-Men; Ultimates
- Notable aliases: Logan; Cable; Mutant X Mutant 0 Stryfe; Weapon X
- Abilities: Regeneration; Superhuman senses, strength, agility, stamina, reflexes and longevity; Adamantium-laced skeletal structure with retractable claws; Skilled martial artist and master hand-to-hand combatant

Wolverine (James Howlett) is a character appearing in American comic books published by Marvel Comics. He is an alternate version of Wolverine that appears in the Ultimate Marvel imprint, which collects stories set in a universe (dubbed "Earth-1610") that is separate from the main Marvel continuity. Created by writer Mark Millar and artist Adam Kubert (based on the original character created by Roy Thomas, Len Wein and John Romita Sr.), the Ultimate version of Wolverine first appeared in Ultimate X-Men #1 (February 2001).

== Fictional character biography ==
=== Early years ===
Wolverine suffered from amnesia. As a result, what little is known about his early life is both suspect and unverifiable. It is believed that, at one point, Wolverine had a wife or girlfriend, but she was supposedly killed by Sabretooth. As both Wolverine's and Sabretooth's memories had been tampered with in the past (most commonly by the Weapon X), this claim was highly suspect; however, Wolverine did own a wedding ring that served as his only link to his past. He also owned dogtags. One side read 'Logan' and the other side 'Wolverine'.

Captain America recognized Wolverine as James Howlett, a paratrooper he had made several jumps with during World War II. He was called "Lucky Jim" because he always survived, no matter how gravely he was injured. Dum-Dum Dugan also recognized him as Jim, though it has not been revealed how he knew him.

Ultimate Origins depicts Nick Fury and Kingpin's unnamed grandfather as looting a house for its goods only to be caught and taken hostage. Tests were conducted on Fury to see if he was a candidate to become a super soldier, and a little over a year later, Howlett was also tested but escaped. Howlett's newly activated mutant abilities kicked in. This was considered the dawn of the mutant race, and Howlett was named "Mutant Zero." At some point in his later years, he was captured by Eric Lensherr's parents in a plan to 'cure' the mutant gene. When Lensherr discovered the plot, he helped to free Wolverine, but not before killing his mother and father. Years later he was experimented on by Weapon X, where he was given his adamantium claws by Malcolm Colcord.

=== Weapon X ===
Wolverine was kidnapped by John Wraith, a mutant-hating commando and head of the Weapon X Project. His memory was erased and he was given the fake name "Logan". He was often tortured and tormented by Wraith and his guards. It was during this time his skeletal structure was bonded with adamantium. While being deployed in the desert during the Gulf War, the vehicle he was in was ambushed, and Wolverine was set loose from his cage. He slaughtered the enemies and came across Nick Fury, the only other survivor, who was injured. Logan carried him back to base, though he was then shot and caged once again. Wraith was surprised that his "living weapon" still retained his humanity.

A couple of years later, Logan broke out of Weapon X with the help of Fury, who never forgot about the man who had saved his life.

Logan later traveled to the Balkan Mountains. After being overwhelmed by a snow storm, he was taken in by a woman named Magda aka "The Witch of Wundagore". While recovering, Logan had intercourse with Magda, but was interrupted by her current boyfriend Eric Lensherr. Using his powers, Lensherr quickly dispatched Logan, hurling him from the mountain and forcing him to wander in the wild alone.

Years later, Wolverine joined Magneto's Brotherhood of Mutant Supremacy, and eventually became Magneto's elite assassin.

=== Joining the X-Men ===
Eighteen months after joining the Brotherhood, Logan was assigned to infiltrate the X-Men and assassinate Professor X. He was accepted into their ranks, and quickly seduced Jean Grey in order to further entrench himself within the team. However, Wolverine accidentally fell in love with Jean, and was devastated when she left him upon discovering his connection to the Brotherhood. Wolverine eventually betrayed Magneto, abandoning his initial mission and truly joined the X-Men after coming to understand and believe in Xavier's cause.

Seeking answers to Wolverine's past (and to liberate imprisoned mutant test subjects), the team traveled to the site of the Weapon X Project. There they encountered Wraith and Sabretooth. Sabretooth burned the files on Wolverine – and thus destroyed the only record of his past – in front of his eyes, leading up to the first match-up between the two. At first, Sabretooth appeared to be winning, until Wolverine scored a dirty hit (slashing Sabretooth in the groin). The battle culminated with Sabretooth's plunge off of a cliff and the complete dismantlement of the Weapon X Project.

Unfortunately, by this time, Jean had begun a relationship with Cyclops, leading to a deep rift growing between the two men. Their rivalry came to a head when Xavier sent the two of them on a mission to the Savage Land, hoping to end their enmity. However, the reverse occurred: Wolverine allowed Cyclops to fall to his death, believing he would then be able to continue his relationship with Jean.

Miraculously, Cyclops survived, and returned, revealing Wolverine's hand in his disappearance. Cyclops blasted Wolverine to the ground, and then shocked everyone by offering to let him remain on the team (his only chance of redemption).

This experience had a profound effect upon Logan. He realized how badly he had betrayed his friends and ceased his antisocial, ruthless ways, and even developed a deep and abiding sense of responsibility. He also displayed a protective side for the younger X-Men, namely Rogue, and even eventually formed a bond of friendship – or at least mutual respect – with Cyclops.

Wolverine's nemesis was far from destroyed as Sabretooth returned as a member of the Brotherhood of Mutant Supremacy, replacing Wolverine at Magneto's side. After a fierce battle, Sabretooth began to taunt Wolverine, saying that he could never be killed, could recover from any injury, and would always return to haunt Wolverine – to which Wolverine responded by decapitating him on the spot.

Wolverine later began a half-hearted relationship with Storm, which he quickly ended. However, they both still harbored feelings for one another, and on a future "date", the couple were attacked by a revived Sabretooth (sporting a scar around his neck).

Sabretooth began to explain how he managed to survive thanks to a few little threads Wolverine neglected to cut, but was rendered comatose for several months. He engaged Wolverine in a brief encounter, until Storm separated the two, inadvertently allowing Sabretooth to take her hostage. Sabretooth said he had not come to fight and revealed that, since his resurrection, his original memories had begun to return. He had become able to determine which memories were fake, as well. He also claimed that Wolverine was his biological father. This claim is unverified.

=== Ultimate Wolverine vs. Hulk ===
Wolverine was contacted by Nick Fury, who was concerned that the Hulk may have survived S.H.I.E.L.D.'s attempt to execute him. Fury assigned Wolverine to find the Hulk, who S.H.I.E.L.D. believed to be in Tibet, and eliminate him. Wolverine tracked down the Hulk in Tibet, where he greeted him. To Wolverine's surprise, Banner was in complete control of himself as the Hulk. The Hulk and Wolverine exchanged words, with the Hulk belittling Wolverine's intelligence and also revealing that Fury had ordered the Ultimates to kill Logan if he ever abandoned the X-Men. Logan then informed the Hulk that Betty Ross wants him dead, angering the Hulk. Wolverine was about to leave but then mockingly suggested he would ask Betty out, leading the Hulk to attack Wolverine.

After a vicious exchange, the Hulk gained the upper hand and proceeded to rip Wolverine in half. Wolverine survived, and began the long climb up a mountainside to retrieve his legs. Unfortunately for Logan, the Hulk was already there when Wolverine arrived. The Hulk said that he would eat one of his legs in order to force Wolverine to leave him alone, but Wolverine responded that he would never stop chasing Bruce Banner until he killed him. At that moment, She-Hulk arrived and confronted an angry Hulk. Wolverine used the distraction to reattach his legs as the Hulk attacked an atomic bomb sent by Fury. Fury then decapitated Wolverine, demanding information, which Logan did not completely give. Locked in the Triskelion, Wolverine met Forge (a former member of the Brotherhood of Mutants), and the two escaped. Wolverine reunited with Betty Ross in a hotel room. Ross transformed into She-Hulk and attacked Wolverine, but he quickly stabbed She-Hulk, which left her in critical condition. Ross begged Wolverine to spare Bruce, but he refused.

Later, Logan went to the airport where Bruce was, got on the same plane, and sat next to him. Logan put a collar made by Forge on Bruce, telling him that if he turned into the Hulk while the collar was on him, he would choke to death. Bruce asked why Logan didn't just kill him and get it over with, to which he answered that he didn't want to kill Bruce; he wanted to kill the Hulk. Bruce said that he did not deserve the treatment and that he was a good person, to which Logan replied that he was a bad person and that it was irrelevant what either of them deserved.

Bruce said that he did not believe Logan to be a bad person and that he would prove it. He then added that he wouldn't change, and jumped out of the airplane emergency exit in mid-flight. Logan jumped out after him screaming at him to turn into the Hulk or the fall would kill him. Bruce said that he would only transform if Logan cut off the collar, or else Logan would have to deal with the fact that he simply let "Bruce", not the "Hulk", fall to his death. Logan, not wanting to be responsible for Bruce's death, showed his moral side and broke the collar. Bruce transformed into the Hulk, grabbed Logan, and landed on his feet with no harm done to either of them. Nick Fury then showed up and told them that they were free to go. He angrily warned Wolverine that he was now on his "sh*t list", but Wolverine stated that he was already on humanity's "sh*t list". The Hulk let Fury go, who then left. In the middle of the desert, the Hulk and Logan calmly discussed getting back to civilization, and the Hulk agreed to pick up Logan and jump to the nearest town to drop him off.

=== Pre-Ultimatum / Banshee ===
Wolverine found out that he was dosed with Banshee and went to Peter Parker for help. He discovered that he wasn't actually dosed, but that properties of the drug were derived from him. Because certain members of the X-Men like Angel, Colossus, Dazzler, Nightcrawler, and Rogue became Banshee addicts, with Angel gaining a humanoid eagle form, Colossus getting strong enough to move his metallic form, Dazzler creating solid light constructs, Nightcrawler teleporting greater distances, and Rogue touching things without draining their lifeforce, the non-addicted members were forced to fight them and prevent them from using Banshee. When Jean fell unconscious, Wolverine violently attacked Colossus but soon cooled off. He then discovered that Xavier and Magneto were responsible for the creation of the power-enhancing drug and that Moira MacTaggert was distributing it. Moira fought Wolverine, but he destroyed the facility in which Banshee was being produced.

=== Ultimatum and death ===
Wolverine is forced to travel to the Savage Land to find the brainwashed Multiple Man and kill him, to stop the waves of Multiple Man suicide bombers worldwide. He vows to do the same thing to Magneto. When the X-Men and the Ultimates finally confront Magneto, Wolverine charges towards his foe, slashing him multiple times before Magneto overrides Iron Man's armor and Cyclops' visor to unleash full-strength blasts from both to incinerate Wolverine. Believing him to be dead, Magneto gets close to Wolverine and begins to gloat. However, Wolverine, despite being nearly fleshless, suddenly jumps up and stabs his claws into Magneto's chest, mortally wounding him. In response, Magneto rips the adamantium from Wolverine's bones and destroys all of his cells, preventing his healing factor from reviving him. As a result, Wolverine is killed, leaving behind just a severely charred skeleton and an arm of flesh. His death would be avenged shortly after, when Cyclops finishes off Magneto.

Following the events of Ultimatum, Kitty Pryde returns to the Triskelion to find Wolverine's fleshless arm (the one that was left inside Magneto's body after Wolverine was killed). She takes Wolverine's arm and buries it next to the remains of the other fallen X-Men in the grave erected for them.

=== Legacy ===
After Wolverine's death, it is revealed that he had a biological son with Magda named Jimmy Hudson. Jimmy inherited his father's claws, healing factor, and facial hair, as well as being born with the ability to coat his bone claws with a liquid metal similar to adamantium. After the Ultimate Universe is destroyed, Jimmy moves to Earth-616.

== Powers and abilities ==
Wolverine has a healing factor that allows him to recover from wounds fairly quickly. Wolverine's healing factor makes him capable of surviving without his legs or even his head attached to his body. The healing factor was not strong enough, however, to save Wolverine from being obliterated by Magneto, who tore the adamantium from his body. Wolverine's mutant power in the Ultimate Universe has been described as the ability to "survive" as opposed to just "heal". It is commonly thought that Wolverine's death in Ultimatum contradicted his ability to recover from fatal wounds, as he was previously shown to survive being ripped in half, decapitated, and even a nuclear explosion.

Wolverine also has a keen sense of smell and is able to detect lies.

== Other versions ==
In an alternate future labeled Earth-2107, Logan goes by the name Cable.

This version of Logan lived an identical life to the present-day Wolverine, until Apocalypse arrived and battled the X-Men. Most of the team died during the battle, and Apocalypse absorbed Cable's healing factor and ripped off his left arm. Some time after the battle ended with Apocalypse as the victor, Cable's left arm was used against him and it scarred his face. Because of his lack of healing factor, the scarring on his face remained. Cable then spent the next three decades fighting Apocalypse until he finally found a way to travel back in time, and as soon as he could he went back 30 years to correct the past. Cable traveled from the future, appearing before Charles Xavier. Cable prepared to kill Xavier, claiming it to be necessary. However, he hesitated, allowing Charles to defend himself telekinetically.

Xavier asked Cable how he was blocking Charles' telepathy, but the man refused to reveal how, calling it a "secret". Cable then tossed a small device at Xavier, which attached itself to his head and (painfully) rendered him powerless. However, Kitty then arrived, and phased Cable through the floor. Cable stabbed her in the gut, and warned her not to become solid again, not even enough to remove the knife, or she will bleed to death. He then apologized for putting her in this situation. Cable proceeded to face each of the X-Men, defeating them all: he knocked Colossus unconscious, deflected Cyclops's blasts with his metal arm (burying Cyclops in rubble), defeated Jean Grey with the same device he used against Xavier, and attacked Storm with a device that turned her own powers against her.

When he was attacked by Wolverine, he held his own for a while, until the X-Man flew into a rage, attacking Cable mercilessly, until he was pushed back, speechless from the claw marks crossing his chest. Cable was then revealed to have unsheathed claws identical to Wolverine's from his organic arm. As the X-Men believed the Professor to be dead, Cable actually transported him back to the future to prepare him for the battle with Apocalypse. Bishop, who had pretended that he was against Cable, was trying to build an X-team strong enough to defeat Apocalypse under orders of the US Government. When they returned to the present, S.H.I.E.L.D. was attacking Apocalypse, who defeated them with ease.

While Apocalypse was able to repel all attacks with ease, the armored Xavier / Onslaught convinced Jean to aid as Cable in his own armor pleads to Bishop and his team. Meanwhile Jean was momentarily shocked about the professor being back, and Jean, Cyclops, Toad, and Iceman were no longer in Apocalypse's control due to Xavier's honed abilities. Cable revealed that he and Bishop were in it together all along and that Professor X was the key to stopping Apocalypse. Wolverine jumped in at the end of Cable's explanation and told them all to start fighting. Professor X and Jean shared a tender moment on a rocky peak, told her what to do and then Apocalypse jumps in. Xavier tried to wipe out Apocalypse psychically, but Cable's plan backfires as Apocalypse somehow resisted. Apocalypse destroyed Xavier's helmet, giving him a bloody nose, and as he was about to kill Cable, Xavier used his enhanced telekinesis but to little effect.

As Apocalypse was about to kill Xavier, Jean begged the Phoenix God to help him, to which it told her it knew she would eventually beg for it. The Phoenix was then unleashed and Jean destroyed Apocalypse, reverting him back into Nathaniel Essex / Sinister, followed by her making sure no one remembered Apocalypse except for the X-Men. The people who had died came back to life, and Wolverine's body and healing factor were fully restored, effectively diverting the possibility of his becoming this version of himself.

== In other media ==
=== Television ===
In X-Men: Evolution, Wolverine (voiced by Scott McNeil) sports the Ultimate version of his costume in the third and fourth seasons.

=== Video games ===
- Ultimate Wolverine appears as a boss in Ultimate Spider-Man (2005), voiced by Keith Szarabajka. He fights Venom after the latter throws his motorcycle through the wall of a bar, but is defeated.
- Ultimate Wolverine's costume has been featured in several X-Men video games, normally as an alternate costume. These include X-Men Legends, X-Men Legends II: Rise of Apocalypse, Marvel: Ultimate Alliance, and X2: Wolverine's Revenge.
