= List of Iron Man titles =

Iron Man is a comic book superhero in the Marvel Universe. Since 1963, he has starred in several ongoing series, as well as a large number of limited series and specials. All stories are published exclusively by Marvel Comics under their standard imprint, unless otherwise noted.

== Primary series ==
- Tales of Suspense #39-99 (March 1963 – March 1968)
- Iron Man #1-332 (May 1968 - September 1996)
  - Iron Man Annual #1-15 (1970-1971; 1976-1977; 1982-1984; 1986-1987; 1989-1994)
- Iron Man vol. 2 #1-13 [#333-345] (November 1996 - November 1997)
- Iron Man vol. 3 #1-89 [#346-434] (February 1998 - December 2004)
  - Captain America/Iron Man Annual #1998
  - Iron Man Annual #1999-2001 (1999-2001)
- Iron Man vol. 4 #1-16 [#435-450] (January 2005 - May 2007)
- The Invincible Iron Man #17-28 [#451-462] (June, 2007 - July, 2008)
- Iron Man: Director of S.H.I.E.L.D. #29-35 [#463-469] (July 2008 - January, 2009)
  - Iron Man: Director of S.H.I.E.L.D. Annual #1 (November 2007)
- The Invincible Iron Man vol. 2 #1-33 [#470-502] (July 2008 - February 2011)
- The Invincible Iron Man #500-527 [#503-530] (March 2011 - December 2012)
  - The Invincible Iron Man #500.1 (February 2011)
  - The Invincible Iron Man Annual #1 (August 2010)
- Iron Man vol. 5 #1-28 [#531-558] (January 2013 - August 2014)
  - Iron Man vol. 5 #20.INH
  - Iron Man Annual #1 (April 2014), Iron Man Special #1 (September 2014)
- Superior Iron Man #1-9 [#559-567] (January 2015 - August 2015)
- The Invincible Iron Man vol. 3 #1-14 [#568-581] (December 2015 - December 2016)
- The Invincible Iron Man vol. 4 #1-11 [#582-592] (January 2017 - November 2017)
- Iron Man #593-600 (December 2017 - July 2018)
- Tony Stark: Iron Man #1-19 [#601-619] (August 2018 - February 2020)
- Iron Man 2020 vol. 2 #1-6 [#620-626] (March 2020 - October 2020)
- Iron Man vol. 6 #1-25 [#626-650] (November 2020 - January 2023)
- The Invincible Iron Man vol. 5 #1-20 [#651-670] (February 2023 - September 2024)
- Iron Man vol. 7 #1-10 [#671-680] (December 2024 - September 2025)
- Iron Man vol. 8 #1-present [#681-present] (March 2026 - present)

== Spin-off series ==
- War Machine #1-25 (April 1994 - April 1996)
- U.S. War Machine #1-12 (Marvel MAX; November 2001 - January 2002)
  - U.S. War Machine 2.0 #1-3 (Marvel MAX; September 2003)
- War Machine vol. 2 #1-12 (February 2009 - February 2010)
- Iron Man: Legacy #1-11 (June 2010 - April 2011)
- Iron Man 2.0 #1-12 (April 2011 - February 2012)
- Iron Patriot #1-5 (March 2014 - July 2014)
- International Iron Man #1-7 (May 2016 - November 2016)
- Infamous Iron Man #1-12 (December 2016 - November 2017)

== Limited series and one-shots ==
- Iron Man and Sub-Mariner #1 (April 1968)
- Giant-Size Iron Man #1 (October 1975)
- Iron Man: Crash (Graphic Novel) (September 1988)
- Iron Manual #1 (1993)
- Iron Man 2020 (vol. 1) #1 (August 1994)
- Marvel Action Hour: Iron Man #1-8 (November 1995 - June 1995)
- Age of Innocence: The Rebirth of Iron Man #1 (February 1996)
- Iron Man: The Legend #1 (September 1996)
- Iron Man: The Iron Age #1-2 (August–September 1998)
- Iron Man Bad Blood #1-4 (September–December 2000)
- Ultimate Iron Man #1-5 (March 2005 - February 2006)
- Iron Man: House of M #1-3 (September–November 2005)
- Fantastic Four/Iron Man: Big in Japan #1-4 (December 2005 - March 2006)
- Iron Man: The Inevitable #1-6 (February–July 2006)
- Iron Man: Hypervelocity #1-6 (March–August 2007)
- Marvel Adventures Iron Man #1-13 (July 2007 - July 2008)
- Iron Man: Enter the Mandarin #1-6 (November 2007 - May 2008)
- Iron Man and Power Pack #1-4 (January - April 2008)
- Ultimate Human #1-4 (January–April 2008)
- Ultimate Iron Man II #1-5 (February–July 2008)
- Iron Man: Legacy of Doom #1-4 (June–September 2008)
- Iron Man: Viva Las Vegas #1-2 (July–September 2008)
- All-New Iron Manual #1 (July 2008)
- Iron Man: Golden Avenger #1 (November 2008)
- Iron Man: The End #1 (January 2009)
- Iron Man & the Armor Wars #1-4 (October 2009 - January 2010)
- Ultimate Comics: Armor Wars #1-4 (November 2009 - April 2010)
- Iron Man vs. Whiplash #1-4 (January–April 2010)
- Iron Man Noir #1-4 (June–September 2010)
- Iron Manual Mark 3 #1 (June 2010)
- Rescue #1 (July 2010)
- Iron Man: Kiss & Kill #1 (August 2010)
- Iron Man: Titanium #1 (December 2010)
- Iron Man: The Rapture #1-4 (January–April 2011)
- What If? Iron Man: Demon in an Armor #1 (February 2011)
- Iron Age: Alpha #1 (August 2011)
- Iron Age #1-3 (August - October 2011)
- Iron Age: Omega #1 (October 2011)
- Captain America and Iron Man #633-635 (August - October 2012)
- Ultimate Comics: Iron Man #1-4 (December 2012 - February 2013)
- Original Sin: Hulk vs. Iron Man #3.1-3.4 (August - October 2014)
- Iron Man: Fatal Frontier #1-13 (December 2013 - March 2014)
- Iron Man Special #1 (July 2014)
- Iron Man Presented by DJI #1 (June 2015)
- King in Black: Iron Man/Doom #1 (December 2020)
- Captain America/Iron Man #1-5 (February - May 2022)

== Writers ==
- Stan Lee Tales of Suspense #39-98 (Iron Man Stories)
- Larry Lieber Tales of Suspense #39, 41-45, 47-51, 53, 58
- Archie Goodwin Tales of Suspense #99, #1-28, 76, 88-90, Iron Man and Sub-Mariner #1
- Mimi Gold #29
- Allyn Brodsky #30-34, 38
- Gerry Conway #35-43, 91-97
- Robert Kanigher #44
- Roy Thomas #44, 47, Annual #11
- Gary Friedrich #45-46, 60, 70
- Mike Friedrich #48-55, 58-59, 61-69, 71-75, 77-81
- Jim Starlin #55
- Steve Gerber #56-58
- Len Wein #82-85
- Roger Slifer #84-85
- Bill Mantlo #78, 86-87, 95-115, Annual #4
- Peter Gillis Annual #5-6
- Ralph Macchio Annual #5
- Bob Harras Annual #7-8
- Evan Skolnick, Carrie Barre, & Rob Tokar Annual #11
- David Michelinie #116-157, 215-250, Annual #9-10
- Bob Layton #116-117, 119-120, 123, 125, 127-133, 135, 137-153, 215-250, 254, 256, Annual #9
- Alan Kupperberg #157
- Denny O'Neil #158, 160-208
- Roger McKenzie #159
- Dennis Mallonee #209
- Danny Fingeroth #202, 210, 212-214, 253
- Howard Mackie #211
- Dwayne McDuffie #251-252, Annual #11
- Glenn Herdling #255
- Fabian Nicieza #255
- Randall Frenz #257
- John Byrne #258-277
- Len Kaminski #278-318, Annual #12-15
- Terry Kavanagh #319-332
- Scott Lobdell Vol. 2 #1-7
- Jim Lee Vol. 2 #1-5, 7, 11-12
- Jeph Loeb Vol. 2 #7-12
- James Robinson Vol. 2 #13
- Kurt Busiek Vol. 3 #1-25, Iron Man & Captain America Annual 1998, Annual 1999
- Joe Casey Annual 1999
- Joe Quesada Vol. 3 #26-35, Annual 2000
- Chuck Dixon Vol. 3 #36
- Frank Tieri Vol. 3 #33-35, 37-49, Annual 2001
- Mike Grell Vol. 3 #50-66
- Robin Laws Vol. 3 #65-72
- John Jackson Miller Vol. 3 #73-85
- Mark Ricketts Vol. 3 #86-86
- Warren Ellis Vol. 4 #1-6
- Daniel Knauf Vol. 4 #7-15, Invincible Iron Man #21-28
- Charles Knauf Vol. 4 #7-16, Invincible Iron Man #17-18
- Christos N. Gage Invincible Iron Man #19-20, Director S.H.I.E.L.D. #33-35, Director S.H.I.E.L.D. Annual #1
- Stuart Moore Director S.H.I.E.L.D. #29-32
- Matt Fraction Invincible Iron Man Vol. 2 #1-33, #500-527, #500.1, Annual #1
- Kieron Gillen Vol. 5 #1-28, Annual #1
- Tom Taylor Superior Iron Man #1-9
- Brian Michael Bendis Invincible Iron Man Vol. 3 #1-14, Invincible Iron Man Vol. 4 #1-13, #593-600, International Iron Man #1-7, Infamous Iron Man #1-12
- Dan Slott Tony Stark, Iron Man #1-19, Iron Man 2020 #1-6
- Christopher Cantwell Vol. 6 #1-24
- Gerry Duggan Invincible Iron Man Vol. 5 #1-20
- Spencer Ackerman Vol. 7 #1-10
- Joshua Williamson Vol. 8 #1-Present

== Collected editions ==
=== Marvel Masterworks: Iron Man ===
Title	Material collected	Year	ISBN
Volume 1	Tales of Suspense #39-50	1992	978-0-7851-1186-3
Volume 2	Tales of Suspense #51-65	2004	978-0-7851-1771-1
Volume 3	Tales of Suspense #66-83, Tales to Astonish #82	2006	978-0-7851-2067-4
Volume 4	Tales of Suspense #84-99, Iron Man and Sub-Mariner #1, Iron Man #1	2007	978-0-7851-2678-2
Volume 5	Iron Man #2-13	2008	978-0-7851-3493-0
Volume 6	Iron Man #14-25	2009	978-0-7851-4129-7
Volume 7	Iron Man #26-38, Daredevil #73	2011	978-0-7851-5044-2
Volume 8	Iron Man #39-53	2013	978-0-7851-6623-8
Volume 9	Iron Man #54-67	2015	978-0-7851-9190-2
Volume 10	Iron Man #68-81	2017	978-1-302-90351-0
Volume 11	Iron Man #82-94, Annual #3-4	2018	978-1302910907
Volume 12	Iron Man #95-112	2019	978-1302917166
Volume 13	Iron Man #113-128, Marvel Premiere #44	2021	978-1302922320
Volume 14	Iron Man #129-144	2022	978-1302929411
Volume 15	Iron Man #145-157	2022	978-1302933364
Volume 16	Iron Man #158-170, Annual #5 and material from Marvel Fanfare #4	2023	978-1302949204

=== Essential Iron Man ===
Title	Material collected	Year	ISBN
Volume 1	Tales of Suspense #39-72	2000	0-7851-3464-6
Volume 2	Tales of Suspense #73-99; Tales to Astonish #82; Iron Man and Sub-Mariner #1; and Iron Man #1-11	2004	0-7851-1487-4
Volume 3	Iron Man #12-38; Daredevil #73	2008	0-7851-2764-X
Volume 4	Iron Man #39-61	2010	0-7851-4254-1
Volume 5	Iron Man #62-87, Annual #3	2013	978-0785167334

=== Iron Man Epic Collection ===
Volume	Title	Material collected	Year	ISBN
1	The Golden Avenger	Tales of Suspense #39-72	2014	978-0785188636
2	By Force of Arms	Tales of Suspense #73-99; Iron Man & Sub-Mariner #1; Iron Man #1; and material from Not Brand Echh #2	2017	978-1302900113
5	Battle Royale	Iron Man #47-67	2022	978-1302933616
10	The Enemy Within	Iron Man #158-177, Annual #5	2013	978-0785187875
11	Duel of Iron	Iron Man #178-195, Annual #6-7	2016	978-0785195061
13	Stark Wars	Iron Man #215-232, Annual #9	2015	978-0785192909
14	Return of the Ghost	Iron Man #233-244, Iron Man: Crash OGN, and material from Marvel Fanfare #22-23, 44	2019	978-1302916299
15	Doom	Iron Man #245-257, Annual #10-11, and material from Captain America Annual #9	2018	978-1302910136
16	War Games	Iron Man #258-277	2014	978-0785185505
17	War Machine	Iron Man #278-289, Annual #12-13	2020	978-1302923518
18	The Return Of Tony Stark	Iron Man #290-297, Annual #14, Marvel Super-Heroes #13, Iron Manual #1; and material from Marvel Super-Heroes #2, 8-9, 12, 14-15	2022	978-1302948191
20	In The Hands of Evil	Iron Man #310-318, War Machine #8-10, Force Works #6-7, Iron Man/Force Works Collectors' Preview #1, and material from Marvel Comics Presents #169-172	2021	978-1302930776
21	The Crossing	Iron Man #319-324, Avengers #390-394, Avengers - The Crossing #1, Force Works #16-20, War Machine #20-22	2023	978-1302951597

=== Iron Man Omnibus ===
Title	Material collected	Year	ISBN
Iron Man Vol. 1	Tales of Suspense #39-83; Tales to Astonish #82	2008	978-0-7851-3055-0
Iron Man Vol. 2	Tales of Suspense #84-99; Iron Man and Sub-Mariner #1; Iron Man #1-25	2010	978-0-7851-4224-9
Iron Man by Michelinie, Layton & Romita Jr.	Iron Man #115-157	2013	978-0-7851-6712-9
Avengers: The Crossing	Iron Man #319-325, War Machine #20-25, Avengers #390-395, Force Works #16-22, Iron Man: Time Slide, Avengers: The Crossing, Iron Man: Age of Innocence	2012	0785162038
Iron Man by Kurt Busiek & Sean Chen Omnibus	Iron Man (vol. 3) #1-25, Captain America (vol. 3) #8, Quicksilver #10, Avengers (vol. 3) #7, Iron Man & Captain America Annual 1998, Fantastic Four (vol. 3) #15, Iron Man Annual 1999, Thor (vol. 3) #17, Peter Parker, Spider-Man (vol. 2) #11, Juggernaut: The Eighth Day #1, Iron Man: The Iron Age #1-2	2013	978-0785168140
Iron Man: The Mask in the Iron Man Omnibus	Iron Man (vol. 3) #1/2, 26-49, Iron Man Annual 2000, 2001	2019	978-1-302-92065-4
The Invincible Iron Man Vol. 1	The Invincible Iron Man (vol. 2) #1-19	2010	978-0-7851-4295-9
The Invincible Iron Man Vol. 2	The Invincible Iron Man (vol. 2) #20-33	2012	978-0-7851-4553-0
Tony Stark: Iron Man By Dan Slott Omnibus	Tony Stark: Iron Man #1-19, Iron Man 2020 (vol. 2) #1-6, Iron Man (vol. 3) 25	2021	978-1302928452

=== Iron Man ===
Title	Material collected	Year	ISBN
Iron Man: Demon in a Bottle	Iron Man #120-128	2006	0-7851-2043-2
The Many Armors of Iron Man	Iron Man #47, 142-144, 152-153, 200 and 218	2008	0-7851-3029-2
Iron Man: Doomquest	Iron Man #149-150, 249-250	2008	0-7851-2834-4
Iron Man: Iron Monger	Iron Man #193-200	2010	0-7851-4260-6
Iron Man: The Many Armors Of Iron Man	Iron Man #47,142-144, 152-153, 200, 218	2008	978-0785130291
Iron Man: Armor Wars Prologue	Iron Man #215-224	2010	0-7851-4257-6
Iron Man: Armor Wars	Iron Man #225-232	2007	0-7851-2506-X
Atlantis Attacks	Iron Man Annual #10 and New Mutants #76; Silver Surfer Annual #2, Avengers West Coast #56, Marvel Comics Presents #26, Avengers West Coast Annual #4, X-Men Annual #13, Amazing Spider-Man Annual #23, Punisher Annual #2, Spectacular Spider-Man Annual #9, Daredevil Annual #5, Avengers Annual #18, New Mutants Annual #5, X-Factor Annual #4, Web of Spider-Man Annual #5, Thor Annual #14, Fantastic Four Annual #22	2011	978-0-7851-4492-2
Acts of Vengeance: Avengers	Iron Man #251-252 and Avengers Spotlight #26-28, Avengers #311-313, Quasar #5-7, Avengers West Coast #53-55, Mutant Misadventures of Cloak and Dagger #9, and material from Captain America #365-367, Thor #411-413, Avengers Annual #19, Avengers Spotlight #29	2011	0-7851-4464-1
Iron Man: Armor Wars II	Iron Man #258-266	2010	978-0-7851-4557-8
Iron Man: Armored Vengeance	Iron Man #258.1-258.4	2013	978-0-7851-5164-7
Iron Man: The Dragon Seed Saga	Iron Man #270-275	2008	0-7851-3131-0
Avengers: Galactic Storm Vol. 1	Iron Man #278, Captain America #398-399, Avengers West Coast #80-81, Quasar #32-33, Wonder Man #7-8, Avengers #345-346, Thor #445	2006	0-7851-2044-0
Avengers: Galactic Storm Vol. 2	Iron Man #279, Thor #446, Captain America #400-401, Avengers West Coast #82, Quasar #34-35, Wonder Man #9, Avengers #347, What If? #55-56	2006	0-7851-2045-9
Iron Man: War Machine	Iron Man #280-291	2008	0-7851-3132-9
Iron Man/War Machine: Hands of the Mandarin	Iron Man #310-312, War Machine#8-10, Force Works #8-7, material from Marvel Comics Presents #167-172	2013	978-0785184287
Avengers: The Crossing	Iron Man #319-325, War Machine #20-25, Avengers #390-395, Force Works #16-22, Avengers: Time Slide #1, Avengers: The Crossing #1, Iron Man: Age of Innocence #1	2012	0-7851-6203-8
Avengers/Iron Man: First Sign	Iron Man #326-331, Captain America #449, Thor #496, Avengers #396-400	2013	0-7851-8496-1
X-Men: The Complete Onslaught Epic - Book Three	Iron Man #332, Incredible Hulk #445, Avengers #402, Punisher #11, X-Man #19, Amazing Spider-Man #415, Green Goblin #12, Spider-Man #72, Fantastic Four #416, Wolverine #105	2008	0-7851-2825-5

=== Heroes Reborn/Heroes Return Era (vol. 2 & 3) ===
Heroes Reborn: Iron Man	Iron Man (vol. 2) #1-12, Avengers (vol. 2) #6, 12; Fantastic Four (vol. 2) #12; Captain America (vol. 2) #12; and material from Heroes Reborn (vol. 1) #1/2; Captain America (vol. 2) #6	2006	0-7851-2338-5
Iron Man: Heroes Return - The Complete Collection Vol. 1	Iron Man (vol. 3) #1-14, Captain America (vol. 3) #8, Quicksilver #10, Avengers (vol. 3) #7, Iron Man & Captain America Annual 1998, Fantastic Four (vol. 3) #15	2019	978-1302916060
Iron Man: Heroes Return - The Complete Collection Vol. 2	Iron Man (vol. 3) #15-25, Annual 1999, Thor (vol. 2) #17, Peter Parker: Spider-Man (vol. 2) #11, Juggernaut: The Eighth Day #1, Iron Man: The Iron Age #1-2	2022	978-1302948245
Iron Man: Deadly Solutions	Iron Man (vol. 3) #1-7	2010	0-7851-4258-4
Iron Man: Revenge of the Mandarin	Iron Man (vol. 3) #8-15, Iron Man & Captain America Annual 1998, Fantastic Four (vol. 3) #15	2012	978-0785162605
Iron Man: The Mask in the Iron Man	Iron Man (vol. 3) #26-30	2001	0-7851-0776-2
Iron Man by Joe Quesada	Iron Man (vol. 3) #26-32, 1/2, Annual 2000	2013	978-0785167365
Iron Man by Mike Grell: The Complete Collection	Iron Man (vol. 3) #50-69	2021	978-1302926779
Avengers: Standoff	Iron Man (vol. 3) #64, Avengers (vol. 3) #62-64, Thor (vol. 2) #58	2010	0-7851-4467-6
Avengers Disassembled: Iron Man	Iron Man (vol. 3) #84-89	2007	0-7851-1653-2

=== Iron Man (vol. 4), Invincible Iron Man (vol. 1 & 2) ===
Iron Man: Extremis	Iron Man (vol. 4) #1-6	2007	0-7851-2258-3
Iron Man: Execute Program	Iron Man (vol. 4) #7-12	2007	0-7851-1671-0
Civil War: Iron Man	Iron Man (vol. 4) #13-14, Captain America (vol. 5) #22-24 Iron Man/Captain America: Casualties of War #1, Civil War: The Confession #1	2007	0-7851-2314-8
Iron Man: Director of S.H.I.E.L.D.	Iron Man (vol. 4) #15-16, Invincible Iron Man #17-18, Strange Tales #135, Iron Man (vol. 1) #129	2007	0-7851-2299-0
Hulk: World War Hulk - X-Men	Invincible Iron Man #19-20 and Avengers: The Initiative #4-5, Irredeemable Ant-Man #10, Ghost Rider (vol. 6) #12-13, World War Hulk: X-Men #1-3	2008	0-7851-2888-3
Iron Man: Haunted	Invincible Iron Man #21-28, Director of S.H.I.E.L.D. Annual #1	2008	0-7851-2557-4
Iron Man: With Iron Hands	Iron Man: Director of S.H.I.E.L.D. #29-32, Iron Man (vol. 3) #36	2009	0-7851-2298-2
Iron Man: Director of S.H.I.E.L.D. - The Complete Collection	Iron Man (vol. 4) #15-16, Invincible Iron Man 17-28, Iron Man: Director of S.H.I.E.L.D. #29-32, Director of S.H.I.E.L.D. Annual #1	2017	978-1302907044
Secret Invasion: War Machine	Iron Man: Director of S.H.I.E.L.D. #33-35, Iron Man (vol. 1) #144	2009	0-7851-3455-7
Invincible Iron Man: The Five Nightmares	Invincible Iron Man (vol. 2) #1-7	2009	0-7851-3412-3
Invincible Iron Man: Worlds Most Wanted Book One	Invincible Iron Man (vol. 2) #8-13	2009	0-7851-3413-1
Invincible Iron Man: Worlds Most Wanted Book Two	Invincible Iron Man (vol. 2) #14-19	2010	0-7851-3685-1
Invincible Iron Man: Stark Disassembled	Invincible Iron Man (vol. 2) #20-24	2010	0-7851-4554-0
Invincible Iron Man: Stark Resilient Book One	Invincible Iron Man (vol. 2) #25-28	2010	978-0-7851-4555-4
Invincible Iron Man: Stark Resilient Book Two	Invincible Iron Man (vol. 2) #29-33	2011	0-7851-4834-5
Invincible Iron Man: My Monsters	Invincible Iron Man #500, 500.1, Annual #1, and material from #503	2011	0-7851-4836-1
Invincible Iron Man: The Unfixable	Invincible Iron Man #501-502, material from #503, Free Comic Book Day 2010: Iron Man/Thor, and Rescue #1	2011	0-7851-5322-5
Invincible Iron Man: Fear Itself	Invincible Iron Man #504-509 and Fear Itself #7.3: Iron Man	2012	0-7851-5773-5
Invincible Iron Man: Demon	Invincible Iron Man #510-515	2012	0-7851-6046-9
Invincible Iron Man: Long Way Down	Invincible Iron Man #516-520	2013	978-0785160496
Invincible Iron Man: The Future	Invincible Iron Man #521-527	2013	978-0785165224
Iron Man by Fraction & Larroca: The Complete Collection Vol. 1	Invincible Iron Man (vol. 2) #1-19	2019	978-1302916282
Iron Man Modern Era Epic Collection: World's Most Wanted	Invincible Iron Man (vol. 2) #1-19	June 2024	978-1302956646
Iron Man Modern Era Epic Collection: Stark Disassembled	Invincible Iron Man (vol. 2) #20-33, Iron Man: Requiem (2009) #1, Rescue #1, Free Comic Book Day 2010: Iron Man/Thor	December 2024	978-1302959951
Iron Man Modern Era Epic Collection: The New Iron Age	Invincible Iron Man #500 (A Story), #500.1, #501-509, Invincible Iron Man Annual (2010) #1, Fear Itself (2011) #7.3: Iron Man	July 2025	978-1302964092

=== Iron Man (vol. 5) ===
Iron Man: Believe	Iron Man (vol. 5) #1-5	March 2014	978-0785166658
Iron Man: The Secret Origin of Tony Stark Book 1	Iron Man (vol. 5) #6-11	September 2013	978-0785168348
Iron Man: The Secret Origin of Tony Stark Book 2	Iron Man (vol. 5) #12-17	December 2013	978-0785168355
Iron Man: Iron Metropolitan	Iron Man (vol. 5) #18-22, 20.INH	May 2014	978-0785189428
Iron Man: Rings of the Mandarin	Iron Man (vol. 5) #23-28	September 2014	978-0785154822

=== Bendis Era: Superior Iron Man, Invincible Iron Man (vol. 3 & 4), International Iron Man, Infamous Iron Man, Ironheart ===
Superior Iron Man: Infamous	Superior Iron Man #1-5	May 2015	978-0785193777
Superior Iron Man: Stark Contrast	Superior Iron Man #6-9	September 2015	978-0785193784
Invincible Iron Man Vol. 1: Reboot	Invincible Iron Man (vol. 3) #1-5	April 2016	978-0785195207
Invincible Iron Man Vol. 2: The War Machines	Invincible Iron Man (vol. 3) #6-11	September 2016	978-0785195214
Invincible Iron Man Vol. 3: Civil War II	Invincible Iron Man (vol. 3) #12-14	February 2017	978-1302903206
International Iron Man	International Iron Man #1-7	August 2017	978-0785199793
Infamous Iron Man Vol. 1	Infamous Iron Man #1-6	June 2017	978-1302906245
Infamous Iron Man Vol. 2: The Absolution of Doom	Infamous Iron Man #7-12	December 2017	978-1302906252
Invincible Iron Man: Ironheart Vol. 1: Riri Williams	Invincible Iron Man (vol. 4) #1-5	July 2017	978-1302906719
Invincible Iron Man: Ironheart Vol. 2: Choices	Invincible Iron Man (vol. 4) #6-11	January 2018	978-1302906733
Invincible Iron Man: The Search for Tony Stark	Iron Man #593-600	July 2018	978-1302910426

=== Tony Stark: Iron Man ===
Tony Stark: Iron Man Vol. 1: Self-Made Man	Tony Stark: Iron Man #1-5	February 2019	978-1302912727
Tony Stark: Iron Man Vol. 2: Stark Realities	Tony Stark: Iron Man #6-11	August 2019	978-1302912734
Tony Stark: Iron Man Vol. 3: War of the Realms	Tony Stark: Iron Man #12-14, Iron Man (vol. 3) #25	October 2019	978-1302914431
Iron Man: The Ultron Agenda	Tony Stark: Iron Man #15-19	April 2020	978-1302920883
Iron Man 2020: Robot Revolution	Iron Man 2020 (vol. 2) #1-6	December 2020	978-1302920852

=== Iron Man (vol. 6) ===
Iron Man Books Of Korvac I: Big Iron	Iron Man (vol. 6) #1-5	March 2021	978-1302925512
Iron Man Books Of Korvac II: Overclock	Iron Man (vol. 6) #6-11	October 2021	978-1302925529
Iron Man Books Of Korvac III: Cosmic Iron Man	Iron Man (vol. 6) #12-19	May 2022	978-1302926274
Iron Man Books Of Korvac IV: Source Control	Iron Man (vol. 6) #20-25, Iron Man/Hellcat Annual #1	December 2022	978-1302932701

=== Invincible Iron Man (vol. 5) ===
Invincible Iron Man by Gerry Duggan vol. 1: Demon In The Armor	Invincible Iron Man (vol. 5) #1-6	August 2023	978-1302947583
Invincible Iron Man by Gerry Duggan vol. 2: The Wedding Of Tony Stark And Emma Frost	Invincible Iron Man (vol. 5) #7-12	February 2024	978-1302947590
Invincible Iron Man by Gerry Duggan vol. 3: Iron & Diamonds	Invincible Iron Man (vol. 5) #13-20	October 2024	978-1302957094

=== Iron Man (vol. 7) ===
Iron Man vol. 1: The Stark-Roxxon War	Iron Man (vol. 7) #1-6	June 2025	978-1302958817

=== Miniseries and miscellaneous ===
Spider-Man/Iron Man: Marvel Team-Up	Marvel Team-Up #9-11, 48-51, 72, 110, 145	October 2018	978-1302913687
Iron Man: The End	Iron Man: The End #1, Tales of Suspense #39, Iron Man #116,144	February 2020	978-1302924614
Iron Man 2020	Iron Man 2020 (vol. 1) #1, Astonishing Tales: Iron Man 2020 #1-6, Amazing Spider-Man Annual #20, Machine Man #1-4, Death's Head #10 and material from What If? #53	September 2018	978-1302913908
Iron Man: Enter the Mandarin	Iron Man: Enter the Mandarin #1-6	May 2008	978-0785126225
Iron Man: Rapture	Iron Man: Singularity #1-4	April 2011	978-0785145592
Iron Man: The Inevitable	Iron Man: The Inevitable #1-6	June 2008	978-0785120841
Iron Man: Hypervelocity	Iron Man: Hypervelocity #1-6	July 2010	978-0785120834
Iron Man: War of the Iron Men	Iron Man: Legacy #1-5	June 2011	978-0785147305
Iron Man: Industrial Revolution	Iron Man: Legacy #6-11	October 2011	978-0785147329
Iron Man/Thor: God Complex	Iron Man/Thor #1-4	May 2011	978-0785151616
Iron Age	Iron Age: Alpha #1, Iron Age #1-3, Iron Age: Omega #1	November 2011	978-0785152699
Iron Man Noir	Iron Man Noir #1-4	October 2010	978-0785147275
Iron Man & The Armor Wars	Iron Man & The Armor Wars #1-4, Iron Man #225	March 2010	978-0785144427
Marvel Adventures Iron Man Vol. 1: Heart of Steel	Marvel Adventures Iron Man #1-4	October 2007	978-0785126447
Marvel Adventures Iron Man Vol. 2: Iron Armory	Marvel Adventures Iron Man #5-8	February 2008	978-0785126454
Marvel Adventures Iron Man Vol. 3: Hero by Design	Marvel Adventures Iron Man #9-12	September 2008	978-0785130086
House Of M: Fantastic Four/Iron Man	House of M: Iron Man #1-3 and House of M: Fantastic Four #1-3	February 2006	978-0785119234
Iron Man: Season One	Original graphic novel	April 2013	978-0785166702
Ultimate Comics Iron Man	Ultimate Comics Iron Man #1-4	March 2013	978-1846535260
Ultimate Iron Man II	Ultimate Iron Man II #1-4	October 2008	978-0785129950
Armor Wars: Warzones!	Armor Wars #1-5, 1/2	February 2016	978-0785198642
Uncanny X-Men / Iron Man / Nova: No End in Sight	Iron Man Special #1 and Uncanny X-Men Special #1, Nova Special #1	November 2014	978-0785191056
Captain America and Iron Man	Captain America and Iron Man #633-635, Captain America and Namor #635.1	December 2012	978-0785165781
Original Sin: Hulk vs. Iron Man	Original Sin: Hulk vs. Iron Man #1-4	November 2014	978-0785191568
Iron Man Vs. Whiplash	Iron Man Vs. Whiplash #1-4	April 2010	978-0785144151
Iron Man: Fatal Frontier	Fatal Frontier Infinite Comic #1-13, Iron Man Annual (vol. 2) #1	June 2014	978-0785184560
Iron Man: Tales of the Golden Avenger	Iron Man: Armored Adventures, Iron Man: Iron Protocols, Marvel Adventures Iron Man #1, Iron Man and Power Pack #3-4.	February 2010	978-0785142799
Iron Manual	Iron Manual #1, All-New Iron Manual #1 and material from Iron Man/Force Works Collector's Preview	September 2008	978-0785134275
Iron Man: I Am Iron Man	Iron Man: I Am Iron Man #1-2, Iron Man #200, and material from Iron Man: Security Measures	April 2010	978-0785145585
What If? Dark Avengers	What If? Iron Man: Demon in an Armor #1 and What If? #200, What If? Dark Reign #1, What If? Spider-Man #1, What If? Wolverine: Father #1	April 2011	978-0785152781
King In Black: Avengers	King in Black: Iron Man/Doom #1 and King in Black: Black Panther #1, King in Black: Captain America #1, King in Black: Ghost Rider #1, King in Black: Immortal Hulk #1, King in Black: Wiccan and Hulkling #1	August 2021	978-1302930349
Captain America/Iron Man: The Armor & The Shield	Captain America/Iron Man #1-5	May 2022	978-1302934637
