= Nathan Edmondson =

American writer

- Born: Augusta, Georgia, U.S.
- Area: Writer
- Notable works: Who is Jake Ellis? Grifter; The Punisher; Black Widow

Nathan Edmondson is an American comic book writer, best known for his creator-owned series Who is Jake Ellis?, published by Image Comics, as well as the runs on The Punisher and Black Widow for Marvel Comics.

Edmondson is the co-founder of Eco Defense Group, a non-profit organization training frontline park rangers throughout Africa, and Archon Ready Group, a company offering firearm training courses in the United States.

== Early life ==
Edmondson is a native of Augusta, Georgia. He graduated from Mercer University's College of Liberal Arts in 2010 with degrees in art and art history.

== Career ==
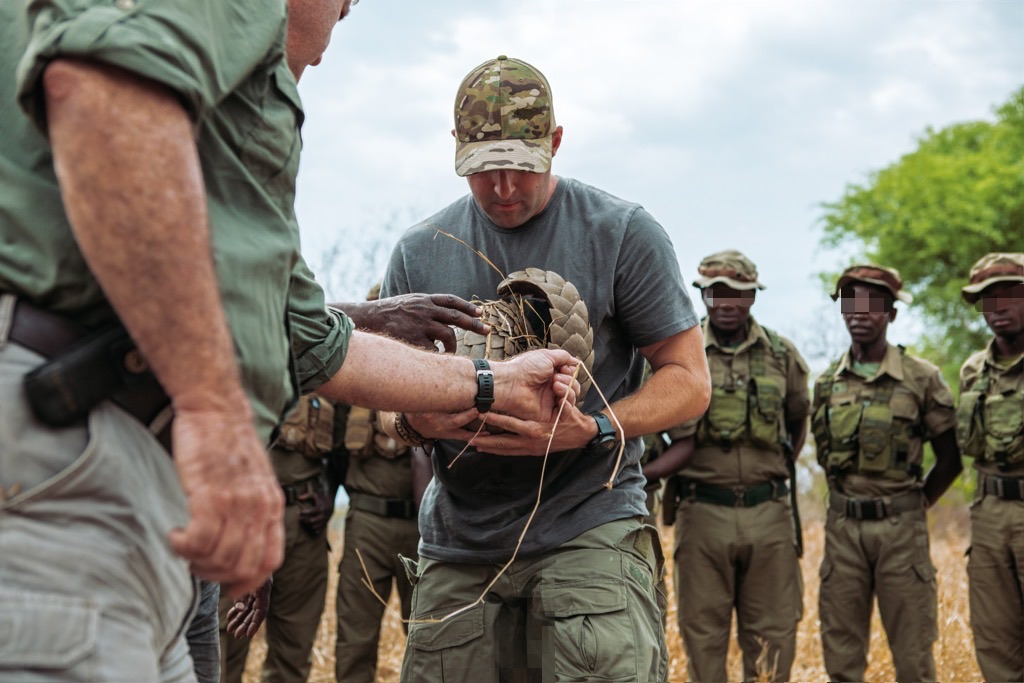
Edmondson in Africa

After working as a director of International Programs at the Leadership Institute, Edmondson entered the comics industry with Olympus, a 4-issue Image Comics mini-series illustrated by Christian Ward. He followed up with two 5-issue mini-series, again published by Image Comics, The Light with art by Brett Weldele and Who is Jake Ellis? with art by Tonči Zonjić. Edmondson's longest work at Image was The Activity, a series about the United States Army Intelligence Support Activity that was born out of his love for the TV series The Unit, the Mission: Impossible film series and military films like Black Hawk Down, as well as the Call of Duty: Modern Warfare video game series. While researching and writing the series, Edmondson consulted with various military personnel.

As part of DC Comics' 2011 initiative The New 52, Edmondson scripted Grifter, introducing the eponymous Wildstorm character into the DC Universe. In 2012, he penned the 4-issue Iron Man series for Marvel's Ultimate Comics imprint, following up with main continuity runs on The Punisher with his The Activity collaborator Mitch Gerads and Black Widow with Phil Noto. Edmondson's latest work at Marvel and his last work in comics to date was Red Wolf.

In 2013, Who is Jake Ellis? was optioned by 20th Century Fox as a project for director David Yates, with Seth Lochhead set to pen the script. In August 2016, Josh Mond was announced as the new director for the adaptation.

In 2015, Paramount Pictures optioned The Activity with Ken Nolan, the writer of Black Hawk Down, attached as the screenwriter. That same year, Edmondson appeared in an acting role in season 5 episode 14 of the TV series Rizzoli & Isles.

In 2016, Variety announced that Edmondson was scripting a pilot for the Gold Standard Media series Prodigal.

In 2017, Edmondson co-founded Eco Defense Group, a 501(c)(3) organization that focuses on counter-poaching and wildlife conservation in southern Africa.

== Personal life ==
Edmondson lives outside Park City, Utah with his wife and two children.

== Bibliography ==
=== Image Comics ===
- Olympus (with Christian Ward):
  - Popgun Volume 3: "They Say..." (anthology graphic novel, 472 pages, 2009, ISBN 1-58240-974-9)
  - Olympus #1–4 (2009) collected as Olympus (tpb, 128 pages, 2009, ISBN 1-60706-178-3)
- The Light #1–5 (with Brett Weldele, 2010) collected as The Light (tpb, 140 pages, 2010, ISBN 1-60706-345-X)
- Jake Ellis (with Tonči Zonjić):
  - Who is Jake Ellis? #1–5 (2011) collected as Who is Jake Ellis? (tpb, 136 pages, 2011, ISBN 1-60706-459-6)
  - Where is Jake Ellis? #1–5 (with additional art by Jordan Gibson (#4–5), 2012–2015) collected as Where is Jake Ellis? (tpb, 124 pages, 2015, ISBN 1-60706-744-7)
- The Activity (with Mitch Gerads and Marc Laming (#6 and 12), 2011–2014) collected as:
  - Volume 1 (collects #1–5, tpb, 136 pages, 2012, ISBN 1-60706-561-4)
  - Volume 2 (collects #6–11, tpb, 168 pages, 2013, ISBN 1-60706-719-6)
  - Volume 3 (collects #12–16, tpb, 160 pages, 2015, ISBN 1-60706-759-5
- Dancer #1–5 (with Nic Klein, 2012) collected as Dancer (tpb, 132 pages, 2012, ISBN 1-60706-627-0)
- The Dream Merchant #1–6 (with Konstantin Novosadov and Anthony Hope-Smith (#4–6), 2013–2014) collected as The Dream Merchant (tpb, 144 pages, 2015, ISBN 1-63215-436-6)
- Genesis (with Alison Sampson, graphic novel, 64 pages, 2014, ISBN 1-60706-995-4)

=== Marvel Comics ===
- Punisher:
  - Untold Tales of Punisher MAX #4: "Manhunt" (with Fernando Blanco, 2012) collected in Punisher MAX: The Complete Collection Volume 6 (tpb, 376 pages, 2017, ISBN 1-302-90739-5)
  - The Punisher vol. 10 (with Mitch Gerads, Carmen Carnero (#7–8), Moritat (#13), Felix Ruiz (#14) and Brent Schoonover (#14, 17–18), 2014–2015) collected as:
    - Black and White (collects #1–6, tpb, 136 pages, 2014, ISBN 0-7851-5443-4)
    - Border Crossing (collects #7–12 and Black Widow vol. 6 #9, tpb, 160 pages, 2015, ISBN 0-7851-5444-2)
      - Issues #7–8 are co-written by Edmondson and Kevin Maurer.
    - Last Days (collects #13–20, tpb, 176 pages, 2015, ISBN 0-7851-9254-9)
- Ultimate Comics:
  - Ultimate Comics: Iron Man #1–4 (with Matteo Buffagni, 2012–2013) collected as Ultimate Comics: Iron Man (tpb, 96 pages, 2013, ISBN 0-7851-6617-3)
  - Ultimate Comics: X-Men #21–22 (co-written by Edmondson and Brian Wood, art by Carlo Barberi, 2013) collected in Ultimate Comics: X-Men by Brian Wood Volume 1 (tpb, 136 pages, 2013, ISBN 0-7851-6136-8)
- A+X #9: "Captain America + Wolverine: Animal Cruelty" (with Humberto Ramos, anthology, 2013) collected in A+X = Amazing (tpb, 136 pages, 2013, ISBN 0-7851-6675-0)
- Black Widow vol. 6 (with Phil Noto, 2014–2015) collected as:
  - The Finely Woven Thread (collects #1–6, tpb, 144 pages, 2014, ISBN 0-7851-8819-3)
    - Includes the "Predator" short story (art by Phil Noto) from All-New Marvel NOW! Point One (anthology one-shot, 2014)
  - The Tightly Tangled Web (collects #7–12 and The Punisher vol. 10 #9, tpb, 160 pages, 2015, ISBN 0-7851-8820-7)
  - Last Days (collects #13–20, tpb, 176 pages, 2015, ISBN 0-7851-9253-0)
- Deathlok vol. 5 (with Mike Perkins, 2014–2015) collected as:
  - Control. Alt. Delete. (collects #1–5, tpb, 120 pages, 2015, ISBN 0-7851-9278-6)
    - Includes the "Terminus" short story (art by Mike Perkins) from Original Sins #1 (anthology, 2014)
  - Man Versus Machine (collects #6–10, tpb, 112 pages, 2015, ISBN 0-7851-9279-4)
- Red Wolf vol. 2 #1–6 (with Dalibor Talajić, 2016) collected as Red Wolf: Man Out of Time (tpb, 136 pages, 2016, ISBN 1-302-90037-4)

=== Other publishers ===
- DC Comics:
  - Grifter vol. 3 #1–8 (with CAFU (#1–3), Scott Clark and Daniel Sampere (#8), 2011–2012) collected as Grifter: Most Wanted (tpb, 192 pages, 2012, ISBN 1-4012-3497-6)
  - Adventures of Superman vol. 2 #13–14: "Infant in Arms" (with Yıldıray Çınar, digital anthology, 2013) collected in Adventures of Superman Volume 1 (tpb, 168 pages, 2014, ISBN 1-4012-4688-5)
  - Batman: Black and White vol. 2 #4: "Ghost of Gotham" (with Kenneth Rocafort, anthology, 2014) collected in Batman: Black and White Volume 4 (hc, 288 pages, 2014, ISBN 1-4012-4643-5; tpb, 2015, ISBN 1-4012-5062-9)
- Mankind: The Story of All of Us: "The Pyramid of Man" (with Dennis Calero, anthology one-shot, Zenescope, 2012) collected in Mankind: The Story of All of Us Volume 1 (tpb, 120 pages, 2012, ISBN 1-937068-68-4)
- 12-Gauge Comics:
  - The Ride: Southern Gothic #1: "Perfect Circle" (with Paul Azaceta, anthology, 2012)
  - Country Ass-Whuppin': A Tornado Relief Anthology: "Contradiction" (with Tariq Hassan, one-shot, 2012)
- Tom Clancy's Splinter Cell: Echoes #1–4 (with Marc Laming, Dynamite, 2014) collected as Tom Clancy's Splinter Cell: Echoes (tpb, 98 pages, 2014, ISBN 1-60690-527-9)
- Ranger (unreleased limited series to be co-written by Edmondson with Adam Baldwin, drawn by Greg Scott and published by Dark Horse — initially announced in 2014)
- North (unreleased limited series to be co-written by Edmondson with Michael B. Jordan, drawn by Denys Cowan and published by Dark Horse — initially announced in 2015)
- The Master (prose novel self-published via Smashwords, 338 pages, 2020, ISBN 0-463-10571-0)

Preceded by Steven Grant	Grifter writer 2011–2012	Succeeded by Rob Liefeld; Frank Tieri
Preceded by Duane Swierczynski	Black Widow writer 2014–2015	Succeeded by Mark Waid
Preceded by Greg Rucka	The Punisher writer 2014–2015	Succeeded by Becky Cloonan
Preceded by Charlie Huston	Deathlok writer 2014–2015	Succeeded by n/a
