= The Punisher (comics) =

The Punisher is the alias of the Marvel character Frank Castle, it can also refer to:

- The Punisher (1986 series), first series of the title
  - The Punisher (1987 series), second series of the title
  - The Punisher (1998 series), third series of the title
  - The Punisher (2000 series), fourth series of the title
  - The Punisher (2001 series), fifth series of the title
  - The Punisher (2004 series), sixth series of the title
  - The Punisher (2011 series), seventh series of the title
  - The Punisher (2014 series), eight series of the title

== See also ==
- List of Punisher titles
