= Ultimate Comics: Iron Man =

Comic book series

- Cover of Ultimate Comics: Iron Man #1

Publication information
- Publisher: Marvel Comics
- Schedule: Monthly
- Format: Limited series
- Genre: Superhero
- Publication date: October 2012 – January 2013
- No. of issues: 4
- Main character: Ultimate Iron Man

Creative team
- Written by: Nathan Edmondson
- Artist: Matteo Buffagni

Ultimate Comics: Iron Man is a comic book limited series published by Marvel Comics that began in October 2012 and ran until January 2013 as part of Marvel's "Ultimate Comics" imprint, based on the Ultimate universe version of Iron Man. The series is written by Nathan Edmondson with interior art by Matteo Buffagni, and cover art by Frank Stockton. The series features the debut of the Ultimate Mandarin, which here is an organisation rather than a lone supervillain.

== See also ==
- Ultimate Comics: Armor Wars
- Ultimate Comics: Ultimates
