= Ultimate Requiem =

Series of comic books

- Cover to Ultimatum: Spider-Man Requiem #1. Art by Stuart Immonen.

Publication information
- Publisher: Marvel Comics
- Genre: Superhero
- Publication date: June — August 2009
- Main character(s): Ultimate Fantastic Four; Ultimate Spider-Man; Ultimate X-Men

Creative team
- Written by: Brian Michael Bendis; Aron E. Coleite; Joe Pokaski
- Penciller(s): Mark Bagley; Stuart Immonen; Ben Oliver
- Inker(s): Scott Hanna; Wade Von Grawbadger; Ben Oliver
- Colorist(s): Pete Pantazis; Justin Ponsor; Edgar Delgado

Ultimate Requiem is a series of comic books published by Marvel Comics. It takes place in the Ultimate Universe following the events of Ultimatum. The X-Men and Fantastic Four stories were published as one shots, while the Spider-Man story was published as a two-issue with the name Ultimatum: Spider-Man Requiem #1 and #2 limited series. The books serve as an epilogue to each of the Ultimate Universe's three core titles, which were all canceled. The issues in the series are the last ones published as Ultimate Marvel comic books before the imprint was relaunched as Ultimate Comics.

== Plot summary ==
=== Spider-Man ===
J. Jonah Jameson and Ben Urich returned to the Daily Bugle offices, still shocked at the widespread destruction caused by the Ultimatum Wave. Jameson believes his family is dead and admits that he was wrong about Spider-Man's supposed criminal status. However, the Daily Bugle's website is still operational, and the remaining staff are determined to keep writing and let the world know what happened. Jameson, inspired by Spider-Man's heroism, decides to write a piece about him, and Urich gives him a flash drive containing all of the Spider-Man stories that Jameson had previously rejected. As he browses the files, Jameson recalls an incident in which Spider-Man saved Tony Stark from Madame Hydra and her Hydra terrorists. Jonah is interrupted by Urich, who informs Jameson that Spider-Man has been reported dead. As Jameson writes the article that has become Spider-Man's obituary, he begins to reflect on the hero's past exploits, remembering another incident in which Spider-Man saved civilians from an attack by the Hulk. He admits that he consistently misrepresented Spider-Man as a villain, rather than a hero. Meanwhile, Captain America, Iron Man and the military are searching for survivors in the ruins of New York City. They then find a maskless Spider-Man in the rubble. In the last panel, Spider-Man opens one of his eyes, signifying that he is still alive.

=== X-Men ===
Shadowcat breaks into the Triskelion to retrieve Wolverine's fleshless arm, the only part of him remaining after his death at the hands of Magneto. Back at the X-Mansion, Jean Grey, Rogue, and Iceman are burying their fallen comrades on the X-Mansion grounds. Rogue uses her super-strength to clear a field in which to bury them. Iceman freezes and destroys the X-mansion, as Jean Grey states, "It's not our home. Not anymore." Shadowcat arrives with Wolverine's arm and adds it to the fallen dead. It is confirmed that all of Wolverine's cells were destroyed by Magneto and that he is incapable of being cloned, healed or resurrected. While they dig the graves, Sabretooth, Mystique, and Assemble arrive claiming that they have come to pay their respects. However, Jean Grey blames them for the destruction and a fight ensues. Captain America arrives decapitating Assemble and stating that he also came to pay respect to the fallen X-Men. Jean Grey uses her telekinesis to carve an epitaph for the X-Men onto a large rock and leaves the grounds of the X-Mansion. The final pages feature obituaries for the X-Men who died during Ultimatum.

=== Fantastic Four ===
The Human Torch recalls arguing with his father, Franklin Storm, shortly before the tidal wave hit New York, killing him. Johnny, who was in shock over his father's death, was captured by Dormammu, who began channeling the Human Torch's flame to escape and attack New York City. After killing Doctor Strange, Dormammu fought the Invisible Woman and Thing, but was eventually defeated and reverted to his human form. Back in the present, Mister Fantastic, upon returning from his battle with Magneto, is reunited with his teammates. Mister Fantastic soon realizes that Doctor Doom will continue to destroy the world if he remains alive. The Thing travels to Latveria and kills Doom after Reed admits to Ben that he does not himself feel capable of doing it, and that nothing else short of killing Doom will stop him.

After the funeral of Franklin Storm, Reed Richards is rejected by Sue, and the Fantastic Four disband. The Thing enlists in S.H.I.E.L.D. as a pilot; the Human Torch opts to live a quiet life in France but then moves in with Peter and May Parker; the Invisible Woman continues to do research at the Baxter Building; and Mister Fantastic moves back in with his biological family as he ponders what to do next.
