= Ultimate Iron Man =

Comic book miniseries written by Orson Scott Card and published by Marvel Comics

Publication information
- Publisher: Vol. 1-2: Marvel Comics
- Schedule: Vol. 1-2: Bi-monthly
- Format: Vol. 1-2: Mini-series
- Publication date: Vol. 1: March 2005-February 2006; Vol. 2: December 2007-July 2008
- No. of issues: Vol. 1: 5 Vol. 2: 5
- Main character(s): Howard Stark, Iron Man, Jim Rhodes, Obadiah Stane, Loni Stark/Stane

Creative team
- Written by: Orson Scott Card
- Penciller(s): Andy Kubert, Mark Bagley
- Inker: Danny Miki
- Colorist: Richard Isanove

Ultimate Iron Man is the name of two comic book miniseries written by Orson Scott Card and published by Marvel Comics. The stories tell the origins of the Ultimate Marvel version of Iron Man, who appears in The Ultimates.

== Publication history ==
The first volume, published between 2005 and 2006, was a five-part miniseries depicting the early life and origins of Tony Stark, and was drawn by Andy Kubert.

The second volume is also a five-part miniseries and had its first issue released on December 12, 2007. This volume follows directly on from the first series and depicts the early uses of the Iron Man armour, art by Pasqual Ferry and Dave McCaig.

Mark Millar's Ultimate Avengers vs. New Ultimates retconned the series so it was actually the origin for an anime cartoon in the Ultimate Universe due to the miniseries' poor reception.

== Volume one ==
Ultimate Iron Man #1 reveals that Tony Stark's genius is the result of an accident his mother (brilliant scientist Maria Cerrera, who is the second wife of Tony Stark's father, Howard, and works for him in research and development before Tony was born) suffered while she was carrying him in her womb. The accident changed the genetic structure of both her and her unborn child, but culminated in her death during childbirth. The child, named Antonio (Tony for short), developed neural tissue normally found only in the brain all throughout his body, causing his entire body to act as one massive brain, giving him tremendous mental capacity. However, one of the side effects of the accident from the minute he was born was an extreme dermal sensitivity, making even the sensation of air on his skin feel like severe burns due to the overstimulation of neural cells in his skin. Howard Stark, a master inventor and owner and CEO of his own billion dollar tech company, used a newly invented liquid, biological armor to ease Tony's agony; a buffer allowing him to interact with the world normally, but one he would have to wear for the rest of his life.

Despite the pain, he is endowed with regenerative capabilities due to the same mutation that caused the neural cells to differentiate all over his body, allowing him to completely regenerate whole body parts if necessary. The biotechnology armor he wears is constructed out of genetically modified bacteria that are able to group together to dissipate kinetic energy when impacted upon, allowing the wearer to withstand tremendous blows and is able to dissolve any metal that can be oxidized. The two disadvantages of this biotech armor, which made it unmarketable, are that it can be easily neutralized by being washed off with antibacterial soap and water and, more importantly, that it will dissolve a normal human's skin after a few hours if not thoroughly washed off. This "side effect" worked well with Tony's regenerative capabilities, seeing as how his skin would regenerate as fast as the armor would eat it, making it a perfect fit. Another secondary problem was that, initially, the liquid armor turned his skin a bright blue hue, making socialization and the idea of going to a normal school more difficult.

In Ultimate Iron Man #2, young Tony Stark is shown covered in the blue skin-armor developed by his father in issue #1. Attempting to learn how to manufacture the bio-armor, Zebediah Stane (not knowing that the armor did not work correctly for normal humans), kidnaps and tortures Tony by washing off the armor with antibacterial soap causing Tony to scream in agony when his unprotected skin hit the air.

In issue #3, Howard arrives with a SWAT team and arrests Zebediah. During the skirmish, the toes on one of Tony's feet are severed (which, after a time, grow back due to Tony's regenerative capabilities, highlighting the extent of this ability). After the incident, a transparent version of the armor is developed, and, no longer blue, Tony begins attending a prep school. The story then fast forwards to an older Stark. His father has lost ownership of his corporation to Zebediah's now-wife Loni (who was Stark's first wife, before Maria) and they now live a middle class existence in a normal home. Tony is trying to follow in Howard's footsteps as an inventor and is developing a prototype power-armor. Not the most popular student at his school, he is constantly picked on and bullied. Seeing that he, also, is the victim of his classmates, Tony eventually befriends fellow student James Rhodes.

Ultimate Iron Man #4 follows Tony Stark, shortly after befriending Rhodes, getting in a scuffle with bullies where they try to force Tony, feet first, into a lit furnace (having been lied to earlier that Tony would not be harmed by this action) that burns and destroys the lower half of his body and nearly leaves him dead. The altercation is interrupted by Tony's friends, causing the bullies to run away. Normally an injury like that would kill a human, but his friends watch, stunned, as Tony's body begins to regrow itself (and eventually regrows completely back to normal as if it never happened). Discovering that the bullies were following orders from an unknown individual, Stark's father decides, for their own protection and to put their skills to better use, to enroll Stark, Rhodes, and Nifara (another of Tony's friends), who witnessed the attack and were all of genius-level intelligence, into the Baxter Building program, a school for above genius intelligence. Also enrolled in the school is Obadiah Stane, the son of Zebediah. Shortly after their arrival, Stark witnesses Obadiah murder a pair of students and then make it look like an accident, but is unable to prove it. This incident hardens Stark's resolve to improve his armor and punish Obadiah. At this point, he has already begun to build a suit that closely resembles a traditional Iron Man suit, with Rhodes and Nifara helping him develop it.

Ultimate Iron Man #5 shows that shortly after Howard's arrest based on planted evidence (by Obadiah) at the gruesome murder of his enemy Zebediah Stane, Tony gets his first taste of champagne at a party held by his father. Tony was warned against alcohol by his father because it would affect his brain more than a normal human due to his decentralized brain tissue and increase his chances of alcoholism. He later says that while he was intoxicated, it was the first time in his life he was not in chronic pain. After Howard's incarceration, Tony takes control of his father's company. It's at this point where two prototype variations of the suit are shown. One is roughly 6 feet (1.8 m) tall, designed for more practical testings, while the second is a large suit at least 20 feet (6.1 m) tall, for designing any additions to the traditional suit before including them to the more restricted design. The suit doesn't fly, but hovers or bounces and is not completely stable. Stark is forced to use the 20-foot (6.1 m) prototype to foil a terrorist plot to destroy his building. Though Tony is successful, the terrorists manage to detonate the bomb prematurely and completely destroy the suit. Tony is also injured, but due to his physiology, bounces back quickly.

== Volume two ==
Despite surviving being blown up in his prototype armor, Tony has other problems to address. Howard is still wrongly imprisoned for the murder of rival Zebediah Stane, and teenage Tony is forced to run Stark Enterprises in his stead. After seeing the prototype armor in use, the military wish to use the armor themselves. Convincing the military that the armors are in fact robots, both Tony and Jim Rhodes (War Machine) suit up and go on the mission masquerading as robots. They complete the mission, and find a map that leads them to believe there are nukes in New York. Tony begins trying to find a way to release his father from jail and find out who the terrorists were that tried to blow up his building.

Obadiah is working with a man named Dolores, who is responsible for the terrorist attack on the Stark building. Dolores convinces him to try to murder Howard. Obadiah drugs a prison guard with a "hypnotizing" bio-drug, and the guard tries to kill Howard. He fails, though Howard gets shot in the process and is in ICU. Tony sends one of his "robots" to protect his father in the hospital.

Tony goes to Obadiah's house in the Iron Man armor and confronts him on setting up his father and sending him to prison. Obadiah says it was all Dolores' idea, and sets up a meeting with Dolores and Tony. Obadiah also figures out that the armor is not a robot, and that Tony is actually inside, a fact he shares with Dolores before he meets with Tony.

Dolores and Tony make a deal. Dolores will give Tony the information about the terrorists with nukes who plan to bomb the city, and Tony will give Dolores one of his "robots". Tony, knowing that Dolores knows he wears the armor personally decides to trick him and actually bring an Iron Man suit that is remote controlled. Dolores and Tony meet on a place together, holding each other hostage while their friends confirm each others's end of the bargain. Dolores is skeptical because the robot isn't walking smoothly and is clumsy, and Tony is skeptical because the feds found a nuke but no terrorists with it, and the deal was for both the nuke and the terrorists. Dolores's men plan to kill the feds who delivered them the robot, but Ultimate War Machine shows up to save them.

Tony then realizes that Dolores is no longer on the plane, and upon breaking into the cockpit he sees another nuke. He can't disable it, because then a separate bomb will go off, destroying the nuke and plane. War Machine goes to Dolores' mansion, only to find him dead. Someone booby trapped his piano, and it blew up in his face while he was playing. Tony flies the plane low enough to the water for Obadiah to jump off. He then gets his nanobots to disarm the nuke and set off the smaller bomb while he attempts to jump off the plane. They realize that another arms dealer was out to kill everyone (Dolores, Obadiah, and Tony).

Meanwhile, Howard is recovered enough to go to prison, but the guards sent to escort him were not sent by the Police Department. He fights them off and escapes. Tony meets with him, and says that he thinks Loni, Howard's first wife and Obadiah's mother, is the mastermind behind the scenes trying to kill them. Tony, Howard, War Machine, and Obadiah set off to Utah to find Loni. They arrive and their chopper explodes, injuring War Machine. Obadiah falls off a cliff, but Iron Man catches him as terrorists arrive on the scene. Iron Man flees, but follows them as they take Obadiah to Loni, and their hideout. Iron Man breaks into the compound and Loni floods it with poison gas trying to kill him, abandoning Obadiah. Iron Man saves Obadiah, but Howard and Nifara are taken captive by Loni. After killing Nifara and the guards, (she wants no witnesses) Loni confesses that all she has ever wanted from life was power, and her only interest in men has been finding one who would help her acquire it. Howard, she laments, was smart enough to be able to conquer the world, but lacked the ambition to do so; Zebediah, her second husband, was the other way around (ambitious, but stupid); Obadiah, on the other hand, is both smart and ambitious, but unfortunately his loyalty to her can no longer be relied on.

Iron Man shows up, and Loni shoots Howard in the chest, threatening to shoot him again if he doesn't take the suit off. Tony takes off his armor, and Loni shoots him in the head, not knowing of his body's self-healing capabilities. Tony fights Loni, beats her, and tends to his father. Unnoticed by anyone else, Loni reaches for a gun, but Obadiah appears, angry that his mother almost killed him with the poison gas, and kills her. However, he decides not to attack Tony, conceding that Tony had saved his life several times, but declares that they are now "even." Howard, Tony, and Obadiah are all picked up by federal authorities and returned home. Obadiah muses that, with his mother dead, he is finally "free."

== In other media ==
=== Television ===
- Tony Stark as a teen being Iron Man was used in Iron Man: Armored Adventures.

== Collected editions ==
Title	Material collected	Published date	ISBN
Ultimate Iron Man	Ultimate Iron Man #1-5	March 2006	978-0785121251
Ultimate Iron Man II	Ultimate Iron Man II #1-5	October 2008	978-0785129950
Ultimate Iron Man Ultimate Collection	Ultimate Iron Man #1-5, Ultimate Iron Man II #1-5	March 2010	978-0785146414
Ultimate Comics Iron Man	Ultimate Comics Iron Man #1-4	March 2013	978-0785166177

== See also ==
- Ultimate Comics: Armor Wars
- Ultimate Comics: Iron Man
- List of works by Orson Scott Card
- Orson Scott Card
- List of Hispanic superheroes
