= Ultimate Marvel =

Marvel Comic imprint

"Ultimate Marvel" thematic stories
- Cover to The Official Handbook of the Ultimate Marvel Universe: Ultimate X-Men, The Ultimates

Publication information
- Schedule: Varied
- Title(s): List of publications
- Formats: Varied
- Original language: English
- Genre: Superhero
- Publication date: 2000–2015

Creative team
- Writer(s): Brian Michael Bendis; Warren Ellis; Mark Millar
- Penciller(s): Mark Bagley; Adam Kubert; Bryan Hitch
- Editor(s): Joe Quesada

Ultimate Marvel, later known as Ultimate Comics, was an imprint of comic books published by Marvel Comics, featuring reimagined and modernized versions of the company's superhero characters from the Ultimate Marvel Universe, later known as the Ultimate Universe. Those characters include Spider-Man, the X-Men, the Ultimates (the Ultimate Marvel Universe counterpart of the Avengers), the Fantastic Four, and others. The imprint was launched in 2000 with the publication of the series Ultimate Spider-Man and Ultimate X-Men in 2001, followed by The Ultimates and Ultimate Fantastic Four in 2002 and 2004, respectively, providing new origin stories for the characters. The reality of Ultimate Marvel is designated as Earth-1610 as part of the Marvel Comics Multiverse.

The Ultimate Universe, as a part of a large-scale reboot of the All-New, All-Different Marvel Multiverse, ended at the conclusion of the 2015 "Secret Wars" storyline, when select characters from the Ultimate Universe moved to the mainstream universe. However, writer Brian Michael Bendis established at the end of the 2017 miniseries Spider-Men II that the universe and its superheroes still exist.

Between June and September 2023, Marvel published the Ultimate Invasion miniseries written by Jonathan Hickman, with art by The Ultimates co-creator Bryan Hitch. The events of the miniseries culminated in the establishment of a rebooted Ultimate Universe designated as Earth-6160, which serves as the setting for a relaunched series of books under the Ultimate Marvel banner, which began with the eponymous Ultimate Universe #1 in November 2023. The new Ultimate imprint also encompasses new versions of Ultimate Spider-Man, Ultimate X-Men, and The Ultimates, as well as a standalone Ultimate Black Panther story.

== Publication history ==
=== Background ===
In the late 1990s, the US comic book industry had declining sales. Annual combined sales from all publishers, which had been close to a billion dollars in 1993, had declined to 270 million. Comic books were briefly seen as valuable investments and sales shops flourished, but prices dropped as the speculative bubble popped in the early 1990s. In addition, the poor reception of the Batman & Robin film cast doubts on the prospects of any other comic book cinematic adaption. Marvel Comics went through a Chapter 11 bankruptcy, many notable artists left the company, and their rival, DC Comics, topped them in sales. Brian Michael Bendis, who was hired to start the imprint, said that "when I got hired, I literally thought I was going to be writing one of the last — if not the last — Marvel comics".

Comic book continuity, which had been a key to the success of Marvel Comics in its early years, turned into a problem for some readers. All stories had to fit into a sixty-year continuity, a bar that not all fans could reach and which scared away some new readers. The usual style of superhero comics with pages of garish colors, fantastical villains and convoluted plots was of little interest to young adult audiences, who preferred the style set by the Matrix franchise. Most superheroes were adults, even those that started as teenagers, such as Spider-Man and the X-Men. Previous attempts to cut the long continuity did not work as expected: DC's Crisis on Infinite Earths and Zero Hour: Crisis in Time caused several plot contradictions, and Marvel's Heroes Reborn was panned by critics and fans. The Dark Age of Comic Books tried to counter the campiness of the Silver Age with violence and shocking content, but the trend was declining as well.

=== Creation ===
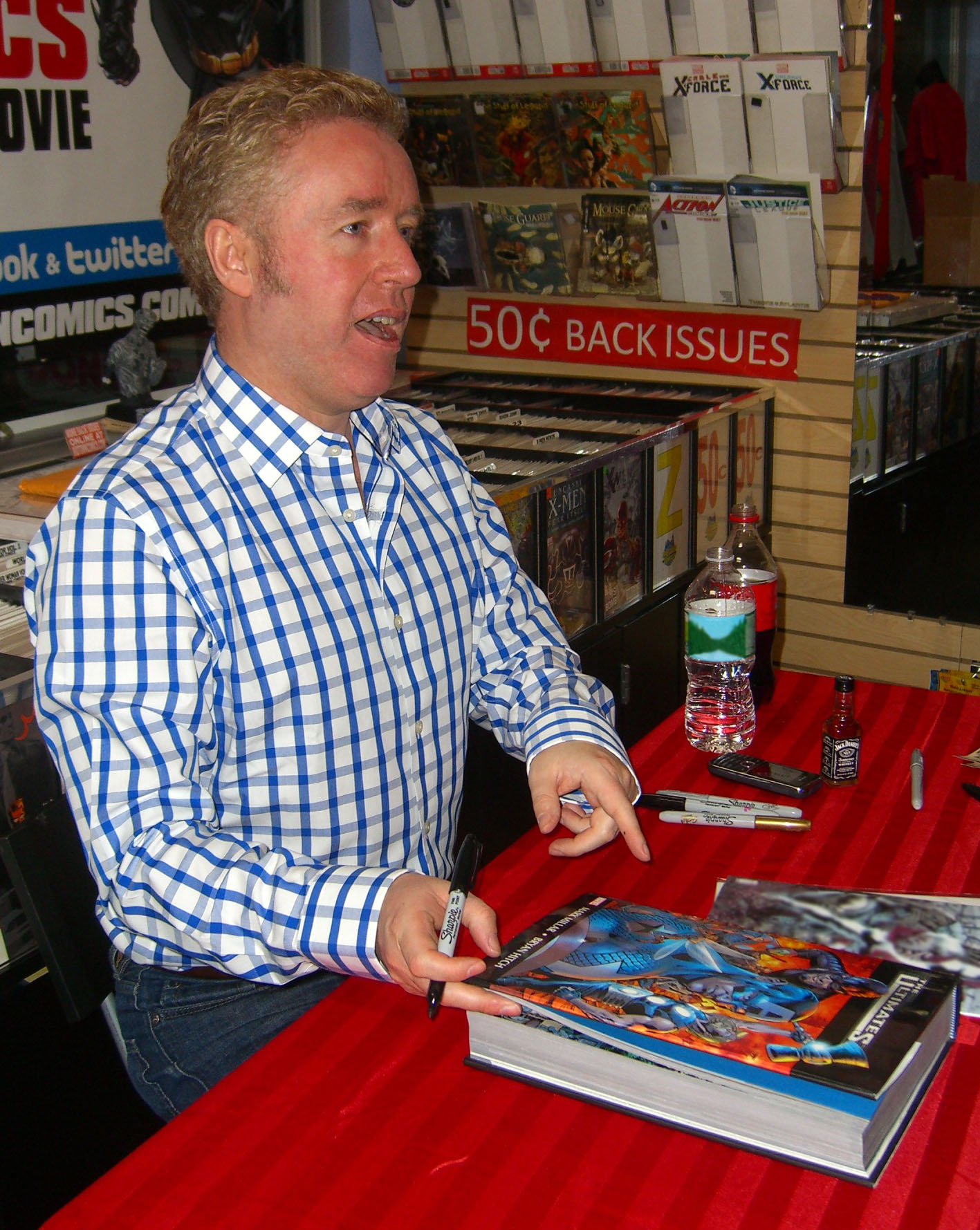
Mark Millar signs a hardcover copy of The Ultimates.

The idea for the Ultimate imprint was developed by Bill Jemas. A lawyer who had worked mainly at the collectible-trading-card industry before that point, he had little interaction with the production of comic books. In his perspective, the main problem of Marvel Comics was that it was "publishing stories that were all but impossible for teens to read — and unaffordable, to boot". He worked on an idea given by a CEO of the Wizard magazine: reboot the heroes to their original character premise. Marvel's editor-in-chief Joe Quesada preferred to start an imprint with new heroes, but accepted Jemas' proposal. The working title for the imprint at that point was "Ground Zero". Unlike previous reboots, there was no in-story explanation for the existence of the imprint, and the standard comic books were still being published, unaffected by the new project. Thus, Ultimate Spider-Man would contain the stories of a new teenager Spider-Man starting his career, and the usual Spider-Man titles would still contain the stories of the adult Spider-Man with nearly forty years worth of continuity.

Quesada then hired Brian Michael Bendis, an artist from indie publishers, for the first comic book of the imprint, Ultimate Spider-Man. One of the previous auditioners had made a word-by-word rewrite of the Amazing Fantasy #15 comic (the debut of Spider-Man), in a modern setting. Bendis preferred to avoid that writing style completely. Instead, he changed the narration style, so that it resembled a TV series more than a classic superhero comic book. There were no thought bubbles or long expositions, and the first issue did not feature any superhero costume. Jemas tried to bring more notice into the comic book by distributing it at chain stores like Payless Shoes and Walmart. The sales rose, and the comic book was acclaimed by critics. The art was created by Mark Bagley, known for his work on Spider-Man and Venom stories in the 1990s. The Bendis/Bagley partnership of 111 consecutive issues made their partnership one of the longest in American comic book history, and the longest run by a Marvel creative team, beating out Stan Lee and Jack Kirby on Fantastic Four.

Ultimate X-Men was also launched in 2001. It was initially delayed by the search for a creative team, and even Bendis' proposed scripts were rejected. The new title was finally given to Mark Millar, who had a controversial run in DC's The Authority. The two authors had conflicting styles: Bendis sought to modernize the old superhero tropes, and Millar sought to critique them. While Bendis tried to write atemporal stories, Millar preferred to set his stories amid the political tensions of the time, with edgy, quick action-driven stories and making the relationship between humans and mutants more realistic and distrustful. The first issue of Ultimate X-Men sold 117,085 copies in a month. Lacking previous knowledge about the characters, Millar based his general draft of the series on the 2000 X-Men film.

Jemas and Quesada paired Millar with artist Bryan Hitch, who had also worked with The Authority, but in a run that did not overlap with Millar's. They would reimagine the Avengers, who were renamed as "the Ultimates". Unlike the simple updates of the Spider-Man and X-Men titles, the Ultimates were a complete reimagination of the Avengers, with very little in common with the mainstream title. Captain America got a rash soldierly (and until the end of The Ultimates 2, jingoistic) personality, Hulk was written as a murderous and cannibalistic monster that kills hundreds of civilians, and Thor was ambiguously introduced as either an actual Norse god (as in the main comics) or a man with stolen weapons and a psychiatric disorder. Nick Fury, originally a caucasian character in the Marvel-616 Universe, was modeled after the actor Samuel L. Jackson, and the new design eventually overshadowed the original one, being incorporated into the mainstream Marvel-616 universe and all new media adaptions of the characters. The main premise was to write a comic that looked the way a superhero film about the Avengers should look. At that point, the Marvel Cinematic Universe had not been created, and the prospect of a film about the Avengers was remote. The series was a huge success, and became the single best-selling comic of the year.

The Ultimate Marvel imprint was benefited by the contemporary topics that took place. Terrorism resurfaced into the public perception as a clear, dangerous and complex menace, which reduced the credibility of the usual supervillains of superhero fiction. Fictional conflicts involving explosions and property damage became more ominous. The Ultimate Marvel comics incorporated those topics into their plots, which would eventually become commonplace in the whole comic book industry. The higher realism of the Ultimate line, in stark contrast with the out-there superhero fantasy of the main comics, led to conflicts between Marvel's artists in 2003. A group proposed to cancel the Ultimate line, and another to close the traditional comics, expanding the Ultimate line to a full company-wide reboot. Although Bill Jemas preferred the Ultimate comics, he pointed out that there were advantages in keeping comics in both continuities and preferred to keep things that way.

=== Ultimatum ===
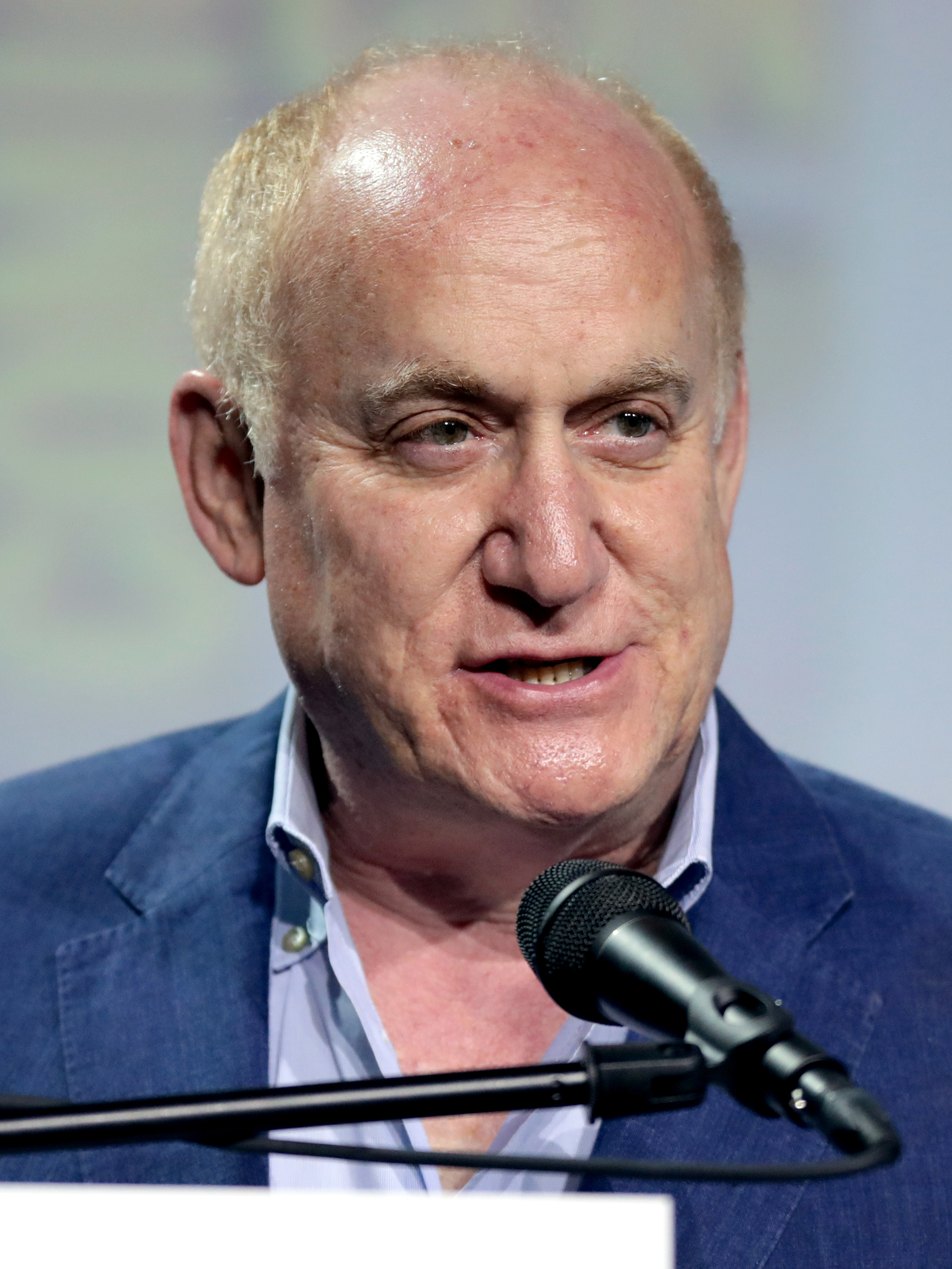
Jeph Loeb, author of Ultimatum.

Jemas was fired from Marvel in 2004, and Millar and Hitch left the Ultimates after writing a second miniseries. Sci-fi writer Orson Scott Card wrote a miniseries, Ultimate Iron Man, which was poorly received and later retconned as an in-universe television show. In 2008, Quesada considered that the Ultimate imprint needed a big crossover event to keep the interest of the audiences, and hired Jeph Loeb for a third Ultimates miniseries that would lead to such event. This miniseries relied on shock value and gratuitous amounts of death and violence, instead of the political overtones of the first two. The art by Joe Madureira was standard superhero art, instead of the cinematic action provided by Hitch. The miniseries had decent sales, but was near-universally panned by critics.

The series was followed by 2009's Ultimatum, a crossover between the Ultimate titles. In five issues, the story kills off thirty-four characters with an increased amount of graphic violence. The series was both a critical and commercial failure, and it has since been regarded as one of the worst comic books of all-time. The sales of the whole imprint were decreased, and never returned to their pre-Ultimatum figures. After the crossover, Ultimate X-Men and Ultimate Fantastic Four were cancelled, with a last issue for each title named Ultimate Requiem to give closure to their plots.

=== Ultimate Comics relaunches ===
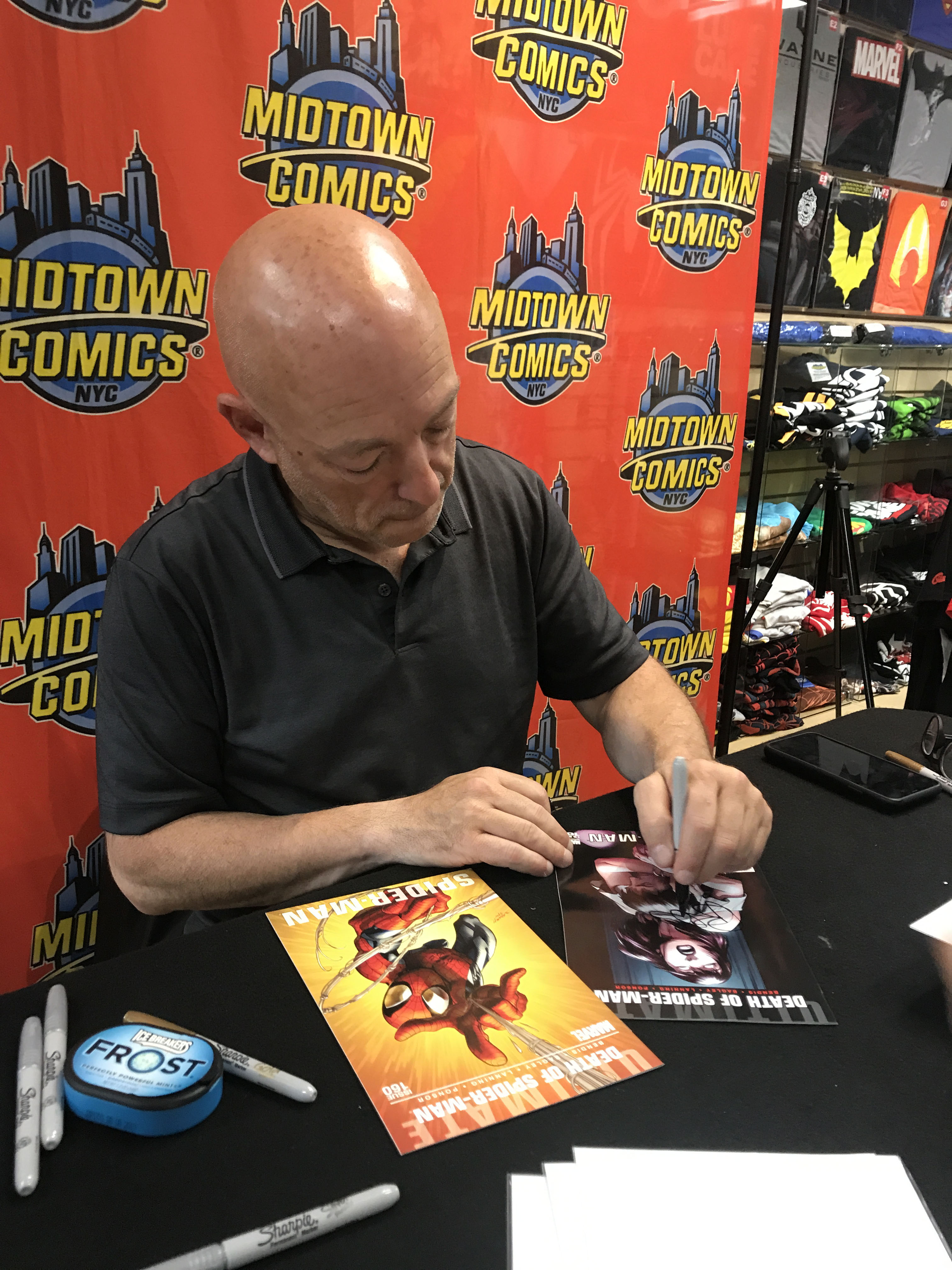
Brian Michael Bendis signs a "Death of Spider-Man" comic.

The Ultimate Marvel imprint was re-launched, as "Ultimate Comics". Ultimate Spider-Man was renamed as Ultimate Comics: Spider-Man, and the line was joined later by Ultimate Comics: Avengers and Ultimate Comics: New Ultimates. New Ultimates featured the reconstruction of the team, and was made by Loeb and Frank Cho. Avengers features a black-operations superhero team, and was made by Millar and several artists.

There was a new relaunch shortly afterwards, named "Ultimate Comics Universe Reborn". Both teams met in Avengers vs. New Ultimates, where Nick Fury is reinstalled as director of S.H.I.E.L.D. and the teams merge again into a single team, the Ultimates. This team would then be featured in Ultimate Comics: The Ultimates, written by Jonathan Hickman. The Death of Spider-Man features the death of Peter Parker and his nemesis Green Goblin. An Afro-Hispanic teenager, Miles Morales, becomes the new Spider-Man. He was featured in Ultimate Comics: Spider-Man, still written by Bendis. The X-Men were relaunched in the miniseries Ultimate Comics: X, which introduced Jimmy Hudson, the son of Wolverine. This miniseries was followed by Ultimate Comics: X-Men, written by Nick Spencer, who explored the X-Men mythos in a setting where both Charles Xavier and Magneto are dead.

Initially, Marvel resisted the idea of crossovers between the Ultimate and the mainstream universes (although the idea had been teased for what turned out to be the beginning of the Marvel Zombies series), but eventually relented. The first crossover was the Spider-Men miniseries, between Miles Morales and the adult Peter Parker. It was made for the 50th anniversary of Spider-Man. All-New X-Men, also written by Bendis, had a story where the main characters got stranded in the Ultimate universe and teamed-up with Morales. However, Bendis and Joshua Hale Fialkov agreed that crossovers should be done sparingly, to keep them interesting, and cited the creative decay in the Marvel/DC intercompany crossovers as a justification.

The Age of Ultron crossover, between the mainstream comics, ended with Galactus displaced into the Ultimate universe. This premise started the "Cataclysm" crossover in the Ultimate imprint, which was followed by yet another new relaunch. The Ultimates disbanded after the crossover, and were replaced by a completely different team, led by Miles Morales. This team starred in All-New Ultimates, by Michel Fiffe and Amilcar Pinna. Spider-Man was relaunched in Miles Morales: The Ultimate Spider-Man, which included the revivals of Peter Parker and Green Goblin. Ultimate FF ("FF" standing for "Future Foundation", not "Fantastic Four") featured the "incursions", a multiversal threat that was being used in Hickman's run on the main universe's Avengers, and which would lead to the Secret Wars crossover. Ultimate FF was cancelled, alongside the Fantastic Four comic book, as a result of the disputes between Marvel and 20th Century Fox over the film rights over the characters.

=== Conclusion ===
The 2015 Secret Wars storyline concluded the Ultimate Marvel imprint. In the plot, it was destroyed alongside all the other alternate realities in the multiverse, and then recreated as a region of the Battleworld. Ultimate End, set in such region, is the last story of the Ultimate imprint. It was produced by Bendis and Bagley, the team that started the imprint. Miles Morales, a character that originated in the Ultimate Universe to take over the mantle of Spider-Man when the Ultimate Universe's Peter Parker died, was migrated to the Marvel-616 universe, along with his supporting cast, a development that saw his mother restored to life, following her death in a 2013 storyline. The story, however, is largely a team-up of characters from the Ultimate and mainstream Marvel universes, with only a superficial relation with the plot of the crossover. Matt Little from CBR suspected that the story may have been conceived at some earlier point, and then slightly modified to serve as a tie-in for Secret Wars.

==== Reuse of characters on Earth-616 ====
Aaron Davis, Morales' uncle, makes his first Marvel-616 appearance in Spider-Man #234. The Maker, an evil Reed Richards, is also restored to life and moved to Marvel-616, where he is a recurring villain in the Infamous Iron Man and New Avengers comic books. The hammer of Ultimate Thor (lost in the Cataclysm crossover) is found by Thor Odinson, who is not capable at the time to wield his classic hammer, owned by Jane Foster. He refuses to take the new hammer, which is then lifted by Volstagg in the Unworthy Thor miniseries. Jimmy Hudson, the son of Ultimate Wolverine, is also revealed to be alive in the new continuity, though this was not explained at first.

After Secret Wars, Marvel published a new comic book named Ultimates, though it bore no relation with the imprint beyond the name. The Ultimates 2 #10, renumbered as #100 under the Marvel Legacy relaunch, features the Ultimates from the Ultimate universe. Bendis left Marvel Comics in 2017 and moved to DC Comics. One of his last comic books was a second volume of Spider-Men II, featuring Peter Parker and Miles Morales. The miniseries ends with the Marvel-616 Miles Morales emigrating to the Ultimate Universe to be reuniting with his lost love, following the death of her Marvel-616 counterpart, confirming that the universe still exists. A brief glimpse of the still-extant Ultimate universe is provided by artist Mark Bagley, showing that Ultimate Peter Parker, who had been revealed alive in one of the last issues, has returned to the role of Spider-Man, and that he is a member of the Ultimates, as is Riri Williams and Hulk. The return of the Ultimate universe was used again in 2019, in story arcs at the Venom and Miles Morales: Spider-Man comic books.

== Publications ==
Titles in this section are organized by approximate publication date and line title.

=== Earth-1610 version ===
==== Ultimate Marvel (2000–2009) ====
- Ultimate Spider-Man #1–133 (vol. 1) (2000-2009), plus Wizard 1/2 special (134 issues in vol. 1 initial run)
- Ultimate Marvel Magazine #1–11 (vol. 1) (2001)
- Ultimate Marvel Team-Up #1–16 (2001–2002) (Note: Ultimate Marvel Team-Up titles include Ultimate Spider-Man Super Special #1 as the series conclusion.)
  - Ultimate Spider-Man Super Special #1 (2002)
- Ultimate X-Men #1–100 (2001–2009), plus Wizard 1/2 special (101 issues total)
- The Ultimates #1–13 (2002–2003)
- Ultimate Daredevil and Elektra #1–4 (2002–2003)
- Ultimate Adventures #1–6 (2002–2004)
- Ultimate War #1–4 (2002–2003)
- Ultimate Six #1–7 (2003–2004)
- Ultimate Fantastic Four #1–60 (2004–2009) (Note: Issues #21-24 crosses over with Marvel Zombies.)
- Ultimate Elektra #1–5 (2004)
- Ultimate Galactus Trilogy (2004–2006) (Note: The Galactus Trilogy titles are listed in order of publication and story development.)
  - Ultimate Nightmare #1–5 (2004–2005)
  - Ultimate Secret #1–4 (2005)
  - Ultimate Extinction #1–5 (2006)
- The Ultimates 2 #1–13 (2005–2007)
  - The Ultimates Saga #1 (written by C. B. Cebulski and Mindy Owens and penciled by Travis Charest with stock art by Bryan Hitch, 2007)
- Ultimate Iron Man #1–5 (2005–2006)
- Ultimate Wolverine vs. Hulk #1–6 (2005–2009)
- Ultimate X4 #1–2 (2005–2006)
- Ultimate Vision #0–5 (2006–2007)
- Ultimate Power #1–9 (2006–2008)
- Ultimate Iron Man II #1–5 (2007–2008)
- Ultimate Human #1–4 (2008)
- The Ultimates 3 #1–5 (2008)
- Ultimate Origins #1–5 (2008)
- March on Ultimatum Saga #1 (2008)
- Ultimate Captain America Annual #1 (2008)
- Ultimate Fantastic Four/Ultimate X-Men Annual #1 (2008)
- Ultimate Hulk Annual #1 (2008)
- Ultimate X-Men/Ultimate Fantastic Four Annual #1 (2008)
- Ultimatum (2008–2009) (Note: The Ultimatum titles are listed in order of publication and story development. One-shot March on Ultimatum Saga #1 and limited series Ultimate Origins are also prologues for the event.)
  - Ultimatum #1–5 (2008–2009)
  - Ultimatum: Spider-Man Requiem #1–2 (2009)
  - Ultimatum: Fantastic Four Requiem #1 (2009)
  - Ultimatum: X-Men Requiem #1 (2009)

==== Ultimate Comics (2009–2011) ====
- Ultimate Comics: Spider-Man #1–15 (vol. 2) (2009–2011)
- Ultimate Comics: Armor Wars #1–4 (2009–2010)
- Ultimate Comics: Avengers #1–6 (2009–2010)
- Ultimate Comics: Avengers 2 #1–6 (2010)
- Ultimate Comics: Doomsday Trilogy (2010–2011) (Note: The Doomsday Trilogy titles are listed in order of publication and story development.)
  - Ultimate Comics: Enemy #1–4 (2010)
  - Ultimate Comics: Mystery #1–4 (2010)
  - Ultimate Comics: Doom #1–4 (2011)
- Ultimate Comics: X #1–5 (2010–2011)
- Ultimate Comics: New Ultimates #1–5 (2010–2011)
- Ultimate Comics: Thor #1–4 (2010–2011)
- Ultimate Comics: Captain America #1–4 (2011)
- Ultimate Comics: Avengers 3 #1–6 (2010–2011)
- Ultimate Comics: Spider-Man #150-160 (reverted to original numbering) (2011)
- Ultimate Comics: Avengers vs. New Ultimates #1–6 (2011)

==== Ultimate Comics: Reborn (2011–2014) ====
- Ultimate Comics: Fallout #1-6 (2011)
- Ultimate Comics: The Ultimates #1-30 (2011–2013) plus #18.1 (31 issues total)
- Ultimate Comics: X-Men #1-33 (2011–2013) plus #18.1 (34 issues total)
- Ultimate Comics: All-New Spider-Man #1-28 (2011–2013) plus #16.1 (29 issues total)
- Ultimate Comics: Hawkeye #1–4 (2011–2012)
- Ultimate Comics: Iron Man #1-4 (2012–2013)
- Ultimate Comics: Wolverine #1-4 (2013)
- Hunger #1-4 (2013) (Note: The Hunger miniseries is one of two story arcs bannered as resulting from the Marvel Universe crossover/miniseries Age of Ultron and serves as a prologue for the following miniseries, Cataclysm.)
- Cataclysm (2013–2014) (Note: Hunger acts as a prologue to the event, while Survive! #1 one-shot serves as the miniseries epilogue.)
  - Cataclysm #0.1 (2013)
  - Cataclysm: The Ultimates' Last Stand #1-5 (2013–2014)
  - Cataclysm: Ultimates #1-3 (2013–2014)
  - Cataclysm: Ultimate Spider-Man #1-3 (2013–2014)
  - Cataclysm: Ultimate X-Men #1-3 (2013–2014)
- Ultimate Spider-Man #200 (vol. 1) (2014)
- Survive! #1 (2014)

==== Ultimate Marvel NOW! (2014–2015) ====
- All-New Ultimates #1-12 (2014–2015)
- Ultimate FF #1-6 (2014)
- Miles Morales: Ultimate Spider-Man #1-12 (2014-2015)
- Ultimate End #1-5 (2015)

== Ultimate Marvel characters ==
- Spider-Man (Ultimate Marvel character)
- Captain America (Ultimate Marvel character)
- Iron Man (Ultimate Marvel character)
- Thor (Ultimate Marvel character)
- Hulk (Ultimate Marvel character)
- Ultimate X-Men
  - Wolverine (Ultimate Marvel character)
- Spider-Woman (Ultimate Marvel character)
- Nick Fury (Ultimate Marvel character)
- Ultimate Fantastic Four
  - Maker (Reed Richards)
- Green Goblin (Ultimate Marvel character)
- Jimmy Hudson
- Tyrone Cash
- Geldoff
- Miles Morales

== Timeline ==
| | 2001 | 2002 | 2003 | | 2004 | 2005 | 2006 | 2007 | 2008 | | 2009 | | | 2010 | 2011 | | 2012 | | 2013 | | 2014 | | | 2015 |
| | “Ultimate” series | | | | | | | | | | | “Ultimate Comics” series | | | | | | | | | | Ultimate Marvel NOW! | | |
| Ultimate Spider-Man | Spider-Man 1-133 | | | | | | | | | | | | Spider-Man | | Sp.-M; 150-160 | | Ultimate Comics: Spider-Man | | | | | | Miles Morales: Ultimate Spider-Man | |
| Ultimate Spider-Man | | Team-Up | | Six | | | | | | | | Requiem | | | | Fallout | S-Men | | | | Cataclysm | | | |
| Ultimate Fantastic Four | | | | | Fantastic Four 1-60 | | | | | | | | | Enemy, Mystery, Doom | | | | | | | | Ultimate FF | | |
| Ultimate Fantastic Four | | | | | | | | | | | | Requiem | | | | | | | | | | | | |
| Ultimate X-Men | X-Men 1-100 | | | | | | | | | | | | | X | | | X-Men | | | | | | | |
| Ultimate X-Men | | | War | | | X4 | | | | | | Requiem | | | | | | | | | Cataclysm | | | |
| The Ultimates | | | The Ultimates v.1 | | | The Ultimates v.2 | | | The Ult. v.3 | | Ultimatum | | Ultimate Avengers | | | Ultimates | | | | | | All-New Ultimates | | |
| The Ultimates | | | | | Galactus Trilogy | | | | | | | | | New Ult. | A.vs.NU | | | | | | Cataclysm | | | |
| Cross-overs | | | | | | | | Vision | | Origins | | | | | | | | | | Hunger | | | | |
| Cross-overs | | | | | | Ultimate Power | | | | | | | | | | | | | | | Cataclysm | | | |
| Limited series | | | Adventures | | | | WH 1,2 | | Human | | WH 3-6 | | | | Thor | Hawkeye | | | Wolverine | | | | | End |
| Limited series | | | D&E | | Elektra | Iron Man v.1 | | | I.Man v.2 | | | | Armor Wars | | Cpt. America | | | Iron Man | | | Cataclysm | | | |

- 1-2. Ultimate Origins #1-2
- 3. The Ultimates #1
- 4-5. Ultimate Origins #3-4
- 6-9. Ultimate Daredevil and Elektra #1-4
- 10-14. Ultimate Elektra #1-5
- 15. Ultimate Origins #5
- 16-27. Ultimate Fantastic Four #1-12
- 28-35. Ultimate Spider-Man #1-8
- 36-38. Ultimate Marvel Team-Up #1-3
- 39-43. Ultimate Spider-Man #9-13
- 44-45. Ultimate Marvel Team-Up #4-5
- 46-51. Ultimate X-Men #1-6
- 52. Ultimate X-Men #½
- 53-56. Ultimate Marvel Team-Up #6-8, #10
- 57-59. Ultimate Spider-Man #14-16
- 60. Ultimate Marvel Team-Up #11
- 61. Ultimate X-Men #7
- 62-63. Ultimate Marvel Team-Up #12-13
- 64-66. Ultimate Comics: Thor #1-3
- 67-71. Ultimate X-Men #8-12
- 72. Ultimate Marvel Team-Up #14
- 73-74. The Ultimates #2-3
- 75-85. Ultimate Spider-Man #17-27
- 86-87. Ultimate Marvel Team-Up #15-16
- 88. Ultimate Spider-Man Super Special #1
- 89-96. Ultimate X-Men #13-20
- 97. Ultimate Comics: Thor #4
- 98-99. The Ultimates #4-5
- 100-104. Ultimate Spider-Man #28-32
- 105-112. The Ultimates #6-13
- 113-119. Ultimate Spider-Man #33-39
- 120-125. Ultimate X-Men #21-26
- 126-128. Ultimate War #1-4
- 129-135. Ultimate X-Men #27-32
- 136-150. Ultimate Spider-Man #40-45, #½, #46-53
- 151-156. Ultimate Adventures #1-6
- 157-163. Ultimate Six #1-7
- 164. Ultimate X-Men #33
- 165-170. Ultimate Spider-Man #54-59
- 171-176. Ultimate X-Men #34-39
- 177-178. Ultimate Spider-Man #60-61
- 179-184. Ultimate X-Men #40-45
- 185-188. Ultimate Spider-Man #62-65
- 189-192. Ultimate X-Men #46-49
- 193-212. Ultimate Spider-Man #66-85
- 213-216. Ultimate X-Men #50-53
- 217-237. Ultimate Fantastic Four #13-26, Annual #1, #27-32
- 238-242. Ultimate Nightmare #1-5
- 243-246. Ultimate Secret #1-4
- 247. "Ultimate Vision" #0
- 248-252. Ultimate Extinction #1-5
- 253-257. Ultimate Vision #1-5
- 258-264. Ultimate X-Men #54-60
- 265-270. The Ultimates 2 #1-6
- 271. The Ultimates Annual #1
- 272. Ultimate X-Men Annual #1
- 273-277. Ultimate X-Men #61-65
- 278. Ultimate Spider-Man Annual #1
- 279-283. Ultimate Spider-Man #86-90
- 284-285. Ultimate X4 #1-2
- 286-291. Ultimate X-Men #66-71
- 292-297. Ultimate Wolverine vs. Hulk #1-6
- 298-304. Ultimate Spider-Man #91-96, Annual #2
- 305. Ultimate Fantastic Four Annual #2
- 306-309. Ultimate X-Men #72-74, Annual #2
- 310-316. The Ultimates 2 #7-13
- 317. The Ultimates Annual #2
- 318. Ultimate Captain America Annual #1
- 319-327. Ultimate Fantastic Four #33-41
- 328-336. Ultimate Spider-Man #97-105
- 337-340. Ultimate X-Men #75-78
- 341-345. Ultimate Fantastic Four #42-46
- 346-350. Ultimate X-Men #79-83
- 351-357. Ultimate Fantastic Four #47-53
- 358-362. Ultimate X-Men #84-88
- 363-366. Ultimate Fantastic Four #54-57
- 367-375. Ultimate Power #1-9
- 376-387. Ultimate Spider-Man #106-117
- 388-392. Ultimate X-Men #89-93
- 393-404. Ultimate Spider-Man #118-120, Annual #3, #121-128
- 405. Ultimate Hulk Annual #1
- 406-409. Ultimate Human #1-4
- 410. The Ultimates Saga #1
- 411-415. The Ultimates 3 #1-5
- 416-419. Ultimate X-Men #94-97
- 420. Ultimate X-Men/Fantastic Four Annual #1
- 421. Ultimate Fantastic Four/X-Men Annual #1

== In other media ==
=== Television ===
The only adaptations of the Ultimate Marvel works to other media are two direct-to-video films by Marvel Animated Features: Ultimate Avengers and Ultimate Avengers 2: Rise of the Panther, based on the Ultimates. The plot was simplified and the political aspects of the original work were removed, turning it into a standard superhero animated film. Other animated series incorporated aspects of the Ultimate comics, despite not being direct adaptations. The 2008 animated series The Spectacular Spider-Man shared many similarities with the Ultimate version of the titular character, including his age, his personal relationship with Eddie Brock, and a supporting cast largely based on their Ultimate counterparts. Despite the name and the involvement of Bendis, Ultimate Spider-Man is a different work (although Peter Parker is modeled after his appearance in the comics though with a slightly bulkier build), aimed primarily at a younger audience. Being criticized by this, Bendis said that the show was made for Disney XD and "not for Showtime". The series adapted some specific storylines such as the episode "Freaky" where Spider-Man and Wolverine switch bodies as in Ultimate Spider-Man #66-67. Miles Morales appeared in that TV series as well first in a cameo before becoming a major character later on for the series adaptation of Spider-Verse. Also in this series, the host for Venom is Harry Osborn instead of Eddie Brock, and takes the form of Spider-Man's black suit. As for the Avengers, some character designs from The Avengers: Earth's Mightiest Heroes were based on the Ultimate comics, such as Captain Marvel and the suit of Captain America during the second season. Nick Fury was based on Ultimate Nick Fury since season 2, which was kept for the following series, Avengers Assemble which also drew influence from Ultimate Marvel comics. As for the X-Men, the 2000 animated series X-Men: Evolution also had important members reimagined as teenagers, and eventually incorporated costumes from the comics as well. Similarly, Wolverine and the X-Men in 2009 had Magneto disassemble and reprogram the Sentinels like in the Ultimate X-Men storyline "Tomorrow People".

=== Film ===
==== Marvel Cinematic Universe ====
Ultimate Marvel has also been a strong influence in the early stages of the Marvel Cinematic Universe. Joss Whedon said that The Ultimates brought Marvel into the modern age in a way no other book did. Tony Stark's personality was based on that of his Ultimate counterpart, and Millar and Bendis were included in the staff as consultants. Samuel L. Jackson, whose likeness was used to create the new version of Nick Fury, was cast as the character in a multi-picture deal, starting in the post-credits scene of Iron Man. The script of the scene was written by Bendis. As a comic book fan, Jackson had noticed the use of his likeness and asked to be included in some eventual film. Bruce Banner's origin story in The Incredible Hulk is based on his origin story from the Ultimate Universe, as both versions become the Hulk while attempting to recreate the Super Soldier Serum that turned Steve Rogers into Captain America. Hawkeye and Captain America's costumes were based on their Ultimate uniforms as well and elements of Captain America's origin story are adapted from the Ultimate comics such as Bucky Barnes being his childhood friend who protected him from bullies and being around the same age, him found and being thawed out of ice by S.H.I.E.L.D. rather than the founding members of the Avengers. Hawkeye also has a family, a context exclusive to the Ultimate comics. The film The Avengers featured the Ultimate take on the team, as a military operation organized by S.H.I.E.L.D. rather than an autonomous superhero group. Kevin Feige based the script of the film broadly on the first miniseries of the Ultimates and the ending of the second. The S.H.I.E.L.D. Helicarrier's design throughout the films is also modeled after the Ultimate Marvel version. The depiction of Falcon in the films is derived from the Ultimate incarnation, and Rogers' relationship with Nick Fury in Captain America: The Winter Soldier is reminiscent of the one in the comics with the Triskellion, a notable landmark in the comics being featured in the film. Spider-Man: Homecoming also had aspects of the comics like Parker's age, a younger Aunt May, introducing Aaron Davis and revealing the presence of Miles Morales and Stark mentoring Spider-Man though without S.H.I.E.L.D. and other heroes being involved like in the comics, and in the same film where Stark sports an armor reminiscent of the Ultimate version. This also extends to Spider-Man: Far From Home where Nick Fury is seen mentoring Spider-Man. Thor has similar traits to his Ultimate counterpart, such as his personality, powers, costume elements, and hammer. Thor ends up getting a new hammer during Avengers: Infinity War which is based on the Ultimate version of Mjolnir.

==== Other films ====
Other films based on Marvel comics were also influenced by Ultimate Marvel, albeit in a less notable degree. The film Spider-Man was released in 2002, two years after the start of Ultimate Spider-Man, and also provided a higher character development for Uncle Ben before killing him in Spider-Man's origin story, while also modifying the character's origin story, by writing a genetically-modified spider, instead of a radioactive spider, as the source of his spider-powers and replacing Mary Jane-Watson, as the main character's primary love interest. The series was rebooted with The Amazing Spider-Man in 2012, and Sony asked Bendis for suggestions. He proposed that Spider-Man should use artificial web-shooters, as in the comics, instead of portraying the ability as a part of the character's mutation, through the form of organic web-shooters in his wrists, as was depicted in the Raimi trilogy. The film series also featured elements and aesthetics borrowed from his Ultimate counterpart's personality and background, such as the emphasis and focus on his parents and their subsequent disappearance; his father Richard Parker being a scientist specializing in biology, who worked on a secret project/experiment regarding the procurement of a special serum that was intended to cure terminal illnesses (which is depicted as being derived from the blood of genetically-modified spiders, encoded to the bloodline of Peter's family, instead of the Venom symbiote in the comics); his signature wise-cracking and motor-mouthed sense of humor; his uncle's speech on responsibility and subsequent argument with Peter, moments before his death; a genetically-modified spider being responsible for Peter's spider-powers; his relationship with Gwen Stacy, mirroring his relationship with Mary Jane-Watson from the comics; Gwen being somewhat rebellious like her Ultimate incarnation and sticking up for Peter, albeit non-violently when he was being bullied by Flash (though in the comics it was Kenny Kong), in addition Flash having a crush on her like he did in the Ultimate comics; his friendship with Harry Osborn being modeled after that of Eddie Brock Jr. in the comics, being childhood friends who have not seen each other in a long time and whose fathers had worked together on a project (with the name Spider-venom being a slight nod to the Venom project and both were intended as a cure for diseases) and it is implied that Norman Osborn betrayed Richard much like Eddie Brock Sr. had in the comics when they both selfishly wanted the research for their own ends and being responsible, even if indirectly in Norman's case for the deaths of Peter's parents. The villains featured in the films are modeled after their Ultimate counterparts, Electro in particular being a blue being of energy and the depiction of Harry's transformation into Green Goblin. The 2007 sequel Fantastic Four: Rise of the Silver Surfer is based on the Ultimate Galactus Trilogy, in particular the design of Galactus. The franchise was rebooted in 2015 with Fantastic Four, which is strongly based on the first arcs of Ultimate Fantastic Four. Sony made an animated Spider-Man film, Spider-Man: Into the Spider-Verse, which starred Miles Morales. The plot is an adaptation of the 2014 storyline Spider-Verse and was released in 2018.

=== Video games ===
The 2005 video game Ultimate Spider-Man is a direct adaptation of the storylines and characters from the eponymous comic. The game is centered around the Ultimate Marvel versions of Spider-Man and Venom, but also features appearances from The Human Torch, Wolverine, and Nick Fury. The 2006 prequel Spider-Man: Battle for New York features a retelling of Spider-Man and the Green Goblin's story, in addition to The Ultimates and Kingpin. The 2004 video game X-Men: Legends and its 2005 sequel X-Men Legends II: Rise of Apocalypse have the titular characters wear their Ultimate costumes, as do the Brotherhood of Mutants. Other Marvel video games have also featured Ultimate influences, such as Marvel Ultimate Alliance and its sequel Marvel Ultimate Alliance 2 having the main costumes of Captain America, Thor, Colossus, Invisible Woman, Mr. Fantastic, and the Human Torch be based on their Ultimate counterparts, while Iron Man, Elektra, Storm, Wolverine, Moon Knight, Doctor Strange, Nick Fury, Deadpool, Magneto, Doctor Doom, Venom, Sabretooth, The Thing, Nightcrawler, Cyclops, and Hawkeye have alternate costumes based on their Ultimate versions. The 2010 video game Spider-Man: Shattered Dimensions features the Ultimate version of Spider-Man as one of its playable characters.

== See also ==
- Heroes Reborn, an earlier attempt by Marvel Comics to reimagine their characters in a separate continuity from 1996 to 1997 albeit less successful.
- New Universe, a standalone universe separate from the main Marvel Universe with no gods, alien races, magic or super science/technology that lasted from 1986 to 1989.
- The New 52, a relaunch by DC Comics of all of their characters from 2011 to 2016.
- All-Star DC Comics, an imprint by DC Comics similar to Ultimate Marvel.
- Earth One, another DC Comics imprint that also did a modern reimagining of its characters.
