= The Punisher (2014 series) =

American comic book series

- Cover to issue 10.

Publication information
- Publisher: Marvel Comics
- Schedule: Monthly
- Format: Ongoing series
- Publication date: 2014
- No. of issues: 20
- Main character(s): Punisher; Howling Commandos

Creative team
- Created by: Nathan Edmondson
- Written by: Nathan Edmondson; Kevin Maurer
- Artist(s): Mitch Gerads; Carmen Carnero
- Penciller(s): Mitch Gerads; Carmen Carnero
- Inker(s): Mitch Gerads; Terry Pallot; Felix Ruiz; Brent Schoonover
- Letterer: Cory Petit
- Colorist(s): Mitch Gerads; Antonio Fabela; Matthew 'Matt' Wilson; Felix Ruiz; Brent Schoonover
- Editor: Axel Alonso; Jacob 'Jake' Thomas

The Punisher is an American comic book series published from 2014 to 2015 by Marvel Comics featuring the character Frank Castle, also known as the vigilante the Punisher. The series lasted 20 issues and was written by Nathan Edmondson, with art by Mitch Gerads.

== Reception ==
The series holds an average rating of 7.5 by 132 professional critics on the review aggregation website Comic Book Roundup.

Of the first issue, IGN's Benjamin Bailey said Edmondson and Gerads embrace that Punisher is a hard character to write, and that they "give [readers] a story about the Punisher moving to Los Angeles and spraying bullets in the direction of those who deserve it." Bailey also stated that the first issue "...reads like the opening to a kick-butt action flick." However, Bailey was critical of some parts of the story, feeling that they were too similar to those from well-established runs like Garth Ennis' tenure with the character under Marvel's adult MAX imprint. John Parker of the ComicsAlliance was especially complimentary of Gerads' art, saying that Gerads "...goes nuts on L.A.: from smog-hazed cityscapes to the desolate beauty of Yucca Valley, he nails the look and color of the environment, and drafts a Frank Castle that recalls classic versions by Mike Zeck, John Romita Jr., and Goran Parlov while being something entirely new. . .[Gerads] is a perfect fit for the book."

== Prints ==
=== Issues ===
No.	Title	Cover date	Comic Book Roundup rating	Estimated sales (first month)
#1	Memento Mori	April 2014	7.8 by 31 professional critics.	54,558, ranked 18th in NA
#2	Coyote	April 2014	7.4 by 22 professional critics.	31,709, ranked 59th in NA
#3		May 2014	8.1 by nine professional critics.	29,936, ranked 69th in NA
#4	Static Charge	June 2014	7.8 by seven professional critics.	28,435, ranked 76th in NA
#5	Blackout	July 2014	7.0 by eight professional critics.	27,471, ranked 81st in NA
#6	Red Dawn	August 2014	7.8 by six professional critics.	26,606, ranked 80th in NA
#7	El Diablito Part One	August 2014	7.8 by six professional critics.	26,192, ranked 84th in NA
#8	El Diablito Part Two	September 2014	8.1 by four professional critics.	25,957, ranked 113th in NA
#9	Friend From Foe	October 2014	6.8 by four professional critics.	25,876, ranked 86th in NA
#10	Mercury Rising	November 2014	7.8 by three professional critics.	23,680, ranked 108th in NA
#11	Boiling Point	December 2014	7.9 by five professional critics.	28,710, ranked 101st in NA
#12	Back In Town	January 2015	8.0 by one professional critic.	21,785, ranked 104th in NA
#13	What I Learned in Cebu	February 2015	6.5 by one professional critic.	21,248, ranked 122nd in NA
#14	Dawn's Early Light	March 2015	7.0 by three professional critics.	21,382, ranked 100th in NA
#15	A Hole in the Ground	April 2015	8.0 by one professional critic.	19,825, ranked 109th in NA
#16	Mr. Castle Goes to Washington	May 2015	7.1 by four professional critics.	19,526, ranked 118th in NA
#17	Capital Punishment	June 2015	7.9 by five professional critics.	19,762, ranked 151st in NA
#18	A Good Day's Work	July 2015	6.5 by two professional critics.	19,563, ranked 125th in NA
#19	Final Punishment: Part One	August 2015	6.7 by five professional critics.	22,860, ranked 109th in NA
#20	Final Punishment: Part Two	September 2015	7.3 by five professional critics.	22,235, ranked 117th in NA

=== Collected editions ===
#	Title	Format	Material collected	Pages	Publication date	ISBN	Estimated sales (North America)
1	Black and White	TPB	The Punisher (2014) #1-6	126	September 2, 2014	978-0785154433	2,503, ranked 18th
2	Border Crossing	TPB	Black Widow #9; The Punisher (2014) #7-12	160	January 20, 2015	978-0785154440	1,977, ranked 32nd
3	Last Days	TPB	The Punisher (2014) #13-20	176	October 20, 2015	978-0785192541	1,838, ranked 60th
