= Ultimate Hulk vs. Iron Man: Ultimate Human =

American comic book limited series

- Cover of Ultimate Human No. 1 (Jan. 2008), featuring Ultimate Hulk and Ultimate Iron Man. Art by Cary Nord.

Publication information
- Publisher: Ultimate Marvel imprint of Marvel Comics
- Schedule: Monthly
- Format: Miniseries
- Publication date: Jan. 2008 to April 2008
- No. of issues: Four

Creative team
- Created by: Warren Ellis
- Written by: Warren Ellis
- Artist: Cary Nord

Ultimate Hulk vs. Iron Man: Ultimate Human (originally titled Ultimate Hulk vs. Iron Man or Ultimate Human) is an American comic book limited series published by Marvel Comics. The limited series set in the Ultimate Universe, is written by Warren Ellis and pencilled by Cary Nord.

The series deals with a desperate Bruce Banner pleading with Tony Stark to cure him of his Hulk affliction.

== Plot summary ==
The story begins with Bruce Banner approaching Tony Stark to assist in curing him of the failed super-soldier serum that still runs through his body. The Leader is shown to be attempting to obtain both men's blood. Stark and Banner travel to a Stark facility and Stark places Banner under extreme environments, causing him to become the Hulk and revealing that the Hulk is capable of adjusting to new environments and situations.

While the Hulk is on a rampage, Stark manages to get himself inside an Iron Man suit. But due to the lack of weapons, Stark must fight Hulk head on. After Stark uses an electroshock to Hulk's brain to cut off his anger, he reverts into Bruce Banner. However, his suit is damaged and overloads, causing him to fall to the ground. He survives the fall due to his advanced healing. After Banner wakes up in the hospital, Stark explains how he has disabled the Hulk using nanites to shut down any Hulk cells that form. Later, Banner explains to Stark his true intentions for the Super Soldier formula that became the Hulk. He felt that if in the 1940s they could turn a dumb kid into Captain America, who is not only a superb physical specimen but a brilliant military strategist, then a 21st-century formula would turn Banner into the greatest mind on the planet. Stark tells Banner to use the time away from the Hulk to work on his Super Soldier formula, and that he can use the Ironworks factory however he pleases. Just then, the Leader's men attack Ironworks and kidnap Banner and Stark.

In Issue 3, the history of the Leader is shown. In the fourth and final issue, Stark shuts down the anti-Hulk nanodes in Banner's body and provokes the Hulk transformation to defeat the Leader, despite Banner's protests and the knowledge that the Hulk will adapt to the nanodes and render them useless in preventing further transformations. The Hulk subsequently escapes and Stark apologizes to Banner for not being able to help him.

== Collected edition ==
Title	Material collected	ISBN
Ultimate Hulk vs. Iron Man: Ultimate Human	Ultimate Human #1-4	ISBN 0-7851-2917-0

== See also ==
- Ultimate Comics: Armor Wars
- Ultimate Wolverine vs. Hulk
- Ultimates
