= Ultimate Comics: Armor Wars =

American comic book limited series

- Cover of Ultimate Comics: Armor Wars

Publication information
- Publisher: Ultimate Marvel (Marvel Comics)
- Schedule: Monthly
- Format: Limited series
- Genre: Superhero
- Publication date: September 2009 – February 2010
- No. of issues: 4 of 4
- Main character: Ultimate Iron Man

Creative team
- Written by: Warren Ellis
- Penciller: Steve Kurth
- Inker(s): Jeffrey Huet; Allen Martinez
- Letterer: Joe Sabino
- Colorist: Guru eFX
- Editor(s): Mark Paniccia; Sana Amanat; Joe Quesada

Ultimate Comics: Armor Wars is an American comic book limited series published by Marvel Comics. The series is set in the Ultimate Universe, and is written by Warren Ellis and pencilled by Steve Kurth.

The story is considered an adaptation of the original Armor Wars story line, placing it in the Ultimate Universe. This is also the second limited series by Ellis to focus on Ultimate Iron Man, after the previous Ultimate Human series. The series was critically acclaimed and heavily praised for its story and art.

== Plot synopsis ==
In the wake of the Ultimatum Wave caused by Magneto, the world is in shambles. New York has been heavily damaged, Europe is suffering from extreme climate changes, and the global economy is extremely weak. Tony Stark has returned to New York to visit Stark Enterprises branch offices. Stark Enterprises is nearly bankrupt, and Tony intends to salvage what he can from his headquarters to rebuild his company as well as keep his technology out of the wrong hands. The focus of his search is the mysterious Remnant 242. However, in his private quarters he finds a woman with red irises, who threatens to blast him with energy and demands that he hand her the blueprints for the nanomachines that allow him to control his armor. He recognizes her as Justine Hammer, daughter of Justin Hammer. She admits that she got superpowers from her father's private superhuman research program, but now she is dying. Stark tries to strike up a conversation, but Happy points out that there is another intruder who is currently on the same floor as Remnant 242.

Stark flies down to investigate and finds that the box in which he left Remnant 242 has been opened. He also finds the thief who is wearing a suit of Iron Man armor. Generating a hypersphere, the thief hides the Remnant in hyperspace and battles Stark. Justine Hammer appears, and after identifying the thief as the "Ghost" she blasts him, damaging the armor enough to force the Ghost to retreat, using a phasing unit even Stark can't understand. Hammer begins to hemorrhage internally and Stark calls off the search so he can get her to a medical facility.

Waking up on board a flying facility with the call-sign "FP1", Justine Hammer explains to Stark that his secure systems were hacked a few months ago, and the Ghost was the first person to illegally acquire re-purposed Iron Man tech... but he is not the last. Stark decides he must get his armor back from Ghost and anyone else who may have taken it, in addition to recovering Remnant 242. Justine says she can help him thanks to her connections in the superhuman underground.

Stark and Justine go to Prague where they find Dr. Faustus who has sold the Iron Man tech. They find out that only one person bought the Iron Man data, someone named Bram Velsing, who lives in Darmstadt. Tony gets into his suit, flies to this new destination, and immediately a fight erupts between the two Iron Men. Iron Man battles Bram Velsing, and after a quick and embarrassing fight, Velsing surrenders. Unfortunately for Velsing, Iron Man isn't looking for a prisoner, and after getting the information regarding where Velsing sold the Iron Man technology (the British) he is left entombed in his damaged suit, supposedly to die. After going to England, Iron Man finds out that the British Police have used the technology to make an army of anti-riot squads codenamed Firepower to break up protests against the government's environmental choices. Tony Stark quickly gets into his damaged Iron Man suit and gives Justine Hammer a specific mission to help in the attack.

Iron Man flies down to the streets of Britain where he finds all the riot Police in modified Iron Man suits. Iron Man immediately attacks them, but is unaware of what weapons they possess. The Police retaliate and the battle quickly accelerates as explosives and bullets fly everywhere. The fight goes up into the sky as Iron Man flees from incoming rockets. Iron Man tries to contact Justine but doesn't get a response. He is able to hold off the Police, killing most of them, but once Iron Man flies low through the city, he gets shot at once and appears to be losing the upper-hand. Suddenly, he is ambushed by the Ghost, causing his suit to fall into the Thames River. The Police take Tony out of the river, bringing him to Justine, who publicly revealed that the British government had bought stolen Stark technology.

Back on the plane, Justine and Tony have sex, and Tony asks her to stay with him, which she agrees to. They are interrupted by an explosion outside their jet. Tony gets into his ruined suit and flies outside to meet two giant Iron Men who blast Tony until he finally is defeated. The robots bring Tony to a base in a stranded desert where he meets his delusional Grandfather, Howard Stark Sr. Howard Stark, Sr. is in charge of the Ghost, the robots who just attacked Tony (ARSENALs), and also Justine. Howard is trying to upgrade his aging suit and demands that Tony assist him. Howard reveals that he has the Remnant the Ghost stole and wants Tony to open it. Inside the box is the dead head of Tony Stark from an alternate universe, specifically Earth-242. Tony explains he got the head while looking at other universes with Reed Richards. The entire Earth was on fire and the head fell through the portal they were looking through. Tony explains that, while he had already upgraded himself for safety, the head has a defense mechanism that automatically destroys any nearby machinery. The Ghost and Howard Sr.'s robot bodyguards are destroyed, while Howard Sr. and Justine immediately die due to a failure of their internal systems which was keeping them alive. Later, at a bar in Berlin, Tony is seen talking to the head while drinking in an extremely depressed state.

== Critical reception ==
As with Ellis's previous Iron Man focused Ultimate Human mini-series, Armor Wars also received a heavy amount of praise. IGN gave it 8/10, concluding "the series has gorgeous art, exceptional dialogue, and an appealing premise. If you're a fan of Tony Stark, this is right up your alley." Chad Nevett of Comic Book Resources went further, stating "Ellis’ Ultimate Tony Stark is a wonderfully entertaining character, one that I could read about every month". David Wallace of Comics Bulletin summarized that "the series as a whole has been one of the better Ultimate books to come out of Marvel's relaunch, developing the Ultimate universe in a new but logical direction, providing a solid take on one of the most enjoyable Ultimate characters, and serving up plenty of action and spectacle for readers to enjoy."

== Collected edition ==
Title	Material collected	ISBN
Ultimate Comics Iron Man: Armor Wars	Ultimate Comics: Armor Wars #1-4	ISBN 0-7851-4430-7

== See also ==
- Armor Wars, an upcoming American film based on the Marvel Comics Armor Wars storyline.
- Ultimate Comics: New Ultimates
- Ultimate Human
- Ultimatum
