= Comanche (comics) =

- Comanche as seen in Shadowland: Power Man #2.

Publication information
- Publisher: Marvel Comics
- First appearance: Luke Cage, Hero for Hire #1 (June 1972)
- Created by: Archie Goodwin; George Tuska

In-story information
- Full name: Darius Jones
- Species: Human
- Team affiliations: Flashmob
- Abilities: Skilled archer and marksman Expert hand-to-hand combatant

Comanche (Darius Jones) is a fictional villain appearing in American comic books published by Marvel Comics. He is frequently seen with his partner-in-crime Shades.

Comanche appeared in the Marvel Cinematic Universe series Luke Cage (2016-2018), played by Thomas Q. Jones.

== Publication history ==
Comanche first appeared in Luke Cage, Hero for Hire #1 (June 1972), created by Archie Goodwin and George Tuska.

== Fictional character biography ==
Born as Darius Jones, Comanche was a young street thug growing up in Harlem, where he became a skilled archer and marksman. Comanche is recruited into a gang called the Rivals alongside also consisted of Carl Lucas, Willis Stryker, and Shades. As a member of the Rivals, Shades engages in a fight with a rival gang called the Diablos and many other gangs while also committing petty crimes and working for crime lord Sonny Caputo. Shades and Comanche are eventually arrested and sentenced to Seagate Prison, where they are tortured by prison guard Albert Rackham.

Several years later, Albert Rackham is fired from Seagate Prison and Shades and Comanche escape. The two decide to seek revenge on Rackham and attempt to enlist Carl Lucas to help him, only to learn that he has gone straight.

Sometime later, Shades and Comanche were hired by Ward Meachum, who respectively provides them with a visor that shoots energy blasts and trick arrows. Carl Lucas (now known as Luke Cage) and Iron Fist track Shades and Comanche to the George Washington Bridge, where they learn that they are working for Meachum. When the police fail to remove Shades' visor, he knocks Cage and Iron Fist off the George Washington Bridge. Shades and Comache try to hold off Cage when he attacks Meachum's building, only to be defeated when Cage knocks a pillar on them.

During the Shadowland storyline, Shades and Comanche have gone their separate ways after Shades goes straight. Comanche joins Nightshade's Flashmob, who battle Shades' son Victor Alvarez. After the group is remanded to Ryker's Island, Big Ben Donovan manages to free Cockroach Hamilton, Mr. Fish, and Spear out while Comanche, Chemistro, and Cheshire Cat remain in prison due to having prior warrants or parole violations.

== Powers and abilities ==
Comanche is an expert hand-to-hand combatant and a skilled archer and marksman.

=== Equipment ===
Comanche wields a bow that he uses to fire trick arrows. He is also skilled with guns and knives.

== In other media ==
Comanche appears in Luke Cage, portrayed by Thomas Q. Jones. This version is the childhood best friend, later lover of, Shades. Additionally, while serving time in Seagate Prison and working as enforcers for the corrupt warden, Albert Rackham, the pair inadvertently contributed to Luke Cage receiving his powers when they grievously beat him for attempting to expose Rackham. After making minor appearances in flashbacks depicted in the first season, Comanche appears in the second season, having been released from prison before returning to Harlem to reunite with Shades in the present. While working for Mariah Dillard with him however, Comanche clashes with Shades over the former's loyalty, leading to him secretly leaking information to NYPD Captain Thomas Ridenhour. When Shades discovers Comanche's treachery, the latter kills Ridenhour, but Shades reluctantly kills him in turn, staging it as if Comanche and Ridenhour ended their confrontation in a mutual kill.
