= Cheshire Cat (Marvel Comics) =

Publication information
- Publisher: Marvel Comics
- First appearance: Power Man #37 (November 1976)
- Created by: Marv Wolfman; Ron Wilson; Ed Hannigan

In-story information
- Species: Human mutate
- Team affiliations: Flashmob
- Notable aliases: Cheshire
- Abilities: Invisibility; Intangibility; Teleportation

Cheshire Cat is a supervillain appearing in American comic books published by Marvel Comics.

== Publication history ==
Cheshire Cat first appeared in Power Man #37 and was created by Marv Wolfman, Ron Wilson, and Ed Hannigan.

== Fictional character biography ==
A crime lord called Big Brother summons Cheshire Cat from Los Angeles to help him against rival crime lord Baron. Working as an informant, he tells Big Brother where to find Power Man.

Cheshire Cat follows Luke Cage and informed Big Brother that he survived his fight with Chemistro, which was being witnessed by Baron's henchman Checkpoint Charlie. Power Man later storms Big Brother's hideout, where he confronts Big Brother and Cheshire Cat.

Cheshire Cat watches Power Man and Big Brother's fight and is present when Big Brother told Power Man about Baron. After Power Man leaves, Cheshire Cat and Big Brother discuss their plans to have Power Man destroy Baron. Cheshire Cat then disappears, intending to take revenge on Power Man. After Cheshire Cat teleports back to Big Brother and tells him about Power Man's meeting with Baron, Big Brother orders Cheshire Cat to kill Power Man. While invisible, Cheshire Cat watches as Power Man smashes up Big Brother's control room. Later, Cheshire Cat is with Big Brother in his helicopter when Power Man is tied up on a train controlled by Big Brother. Power Man survives the train crashing and confronts Big Brother.

During the Shadowland storyline, Cheshire Cat joins Nightshade's Flashmob. They target Victor Alvarez, but are defeated by Victor, Luke Cage, and Iron Fist, with Cheshire Cat being knocked out by Iron Fist. Big Ben Donovan is unable to secure the release of Cheshire Cat, Chemistro, and Comanche for Nightshade due to their respective arrest warrants and parole violations.

Cheshire Cat and Flashmob attempt to leave Manhattan during the Spider-Island storyline amidst the spider outbreak caused by Spider-Queen, but are defeated by the Heroes for Hire.

== Powers and abilities ==
Cheshire Cat has the ability to become invisible and intangible. He can also teleport with his arrival being a secret due to his invisibility.
