= List of The Avengers: Earth's Mightiest Heroes characters =

The following is a list of characters appearing in the animated television series, The Avengers: Earth's Mightiest Heroes. The series itself is based on the comic book superhero team the Avengers published by Marvel Comics.

== Avengers ==
=== Main team ===
- Hank Pym (voiced by Wally Wingert) is a scientist and founding member of the Avengers who uses Pym Particles to manipulate his size. He is initially known as Ant-Man and Giant-Man, and later known as Yellowjacket. Founding member. Pym leaves the team in the episode "Ultron-5", but rejoins in "Yellowjacket".
- Hulk (voiced by Fred Tatasciore) is the alter ego of Bruce Banner (voiced by Gabriel Mann), a scientist who was transformed by exposure to gamma radiation. The two are initially fugitives before joining the Avengers, with Banner agreeing to let the Hulk remain in control of their body in exchange for Hulk helping the Avengers. In the episode "Nightmare in Red", it is revealed that Banner is given back control of his body one day a month.
- Iron Man / Tony Stark (voiced by Eric Loomis) is a billionaire businessman who operates as a superhero using powered armor. He is a founding member of the Avengers.
- Thor (voiced by Rick D. Wasserman) is a thunder god from Asgard who came to Earth to protect humanity. He is a founding member of the Avengers.
- Wasp / Janet van Dyne (voiced by Colleen O'Shaughnessey) is an associate of Hank Pym who can generate electricity and shrink via Pym Particles. She is a founding member of the Avengers.
- Captain America / Steve Rogers (voiced by Brian Bloom) is a super-soldier who operated during World War II and was cryogenically frozen for decades after falling into Arctic waters before being free in the present. He possesses superhuman physical abilities and wields an indestructible shield. Captain America joins the Avengers in the episode "Living Legend".
- Black Panther / T'Challa (voiced by James C. Mathis III) is the ruler of Wakanda who succeeded his late father T'Chaka. He wields vibranium-based armor and claws. Black Panther joins the Avengers in the episode "Panther's Quest".
- Hawkeye / Clint Barton (voiced by Chris Cox) is an archer and agent of S.H.I.E.L.D. who later joins the Avengers.
- Ms. Marvel / Carol Danvers (voiced by Jennifer Hale) is a scientist of S.H.I.E.L.D. who gains flight and energy-manipulating abilities from an accident that imprinted Mar-Vell's DNA onto her.
- Vision (voiced by Peter Jessop) is a reformed android created by Ultron. He can manipulate his density, enabling him to be intangible.

=== New Avengers ===
The New Avengers are a team created as a backup to the main Avengers team.

- Spider-Man (voiced by Drake Bell) is a teen spider-themed vigilante who possesses spider-like strength and agility. Josh Keaton, who voiced Spider-Man in The Spectacular Spider-Man, had recorded Spider-Man's voice in the series, but was re-dubbed by Bell (who voiced the character in Ultimate Spider-Man).
- Iron Fist (voiced by Loren Lester) is a member of the Heroes for Hire. He can manipulate chi energy and is a master martial artist.
- Luke Cage (voiced by Christopher B. Duncan) is a member of the Heroes for Hire. He possesses superhuman strength and indestructible skin.
- War Machine (voiced by Bumper Robinson) is a member of the New Avengers who wields armor similar to Iron Man's.
- Wolverine (voiced by Steve Blum) is a member of the X-Men and a mutant who possesses a healing factor and adamantium claws. He was part of the Howling Commandos during World War II, with his healing factor giving him an extended lifespan and enabling him to survive to the present.

== Supporting ==
=== Avengers' support crew ===
- J.A.R.V.I.S. (voiced by Phil LaMarr) is Iron Man's A.I. assistant who is also incorporated into the Avengers Mansion.
- Pepper Potts (voiced by Dawn Olivieri) is an employee and associate of Iron Man.
- Jane Foster (voiced by Kari Wahlgren) is a paramedic and friend of Thor.

=== S.H.I.E.L.D. ===
- Nick Fury (voiced by Alex Désert) is the director of S.H.I.E.L.D. before leaving the group to deal with the mass breakout, leaving Maria Hill in charge.
- Black Widow (voiced by Vanessa Marshall) is an agent of S.H.I.E.L.D. and a member of Nick Fury's Secret Warriors.
- Maria Hill (voiced by Kari Wuhrer) is an agent of S.H.I.E.L.D. who later replaces Nick Fury as its director.
- Mockingbird (voiced by E. G. Daily) is a special agent of S.H.I.E.L.D.
- Clay Quartermain (voiced by Troy Baker) is a field agent of S.H.I.E.L.D.
- Jimmy Woo (voiced by Nolan North) is an agent of S.H.I.E.L.D.
- Jasper Sitwell (voiced by Tom Kane) is an agent of S.H.I.E.L.D.
- The Mandroids are agents of S.H.I.E.L.D. who wield powered armor derived from Iron Man's technology.

=== Other supporting characters ===
- Abigail Brand (voiced by Mary Elizabeth McGlynn) is an agent of S.W.O.R.D. who possesses pyrokinesis.
- Abraham Erskine is a scientist who created the super-serum that empowered Captain America.
- Ant-Man / Scott Lang (voiced by Crispin Freeman) is a criminal who steals the Ant-Man suit to rescue his daughter Cassie. After rescuing Cassie, he is allowed to keep the Ant-Man suit.
- Balder (voiced by Nolan North) is an Asgardian warrior and ally of Thor.
- Beta Ray Bill (voiced by Steve Blum) is a Korbinite, a humanoid alien who was genetically modified to protect the survivors of his destroyed homeworld Korbin.
- Betty Brant (voiced by Grey DeLisle) is a secretary at the Daily Bugle.
- Black Knight is a knight-themed hero who wields the Ebony Blade.
- Black Panther / T'Chaka (voiced by Hakeem Kae-Kazim) is T'Challa's father and predecessor as Black Panther. He is killed by Man-Ape and Klaw during their takeover of Wakanda.
- Bucky Barnes (voiced by Scott Menville) is Captain America's former sidekick who died during World War II. In the present, Captain America inadvertently alters history after obtaining the Cosmic Cube, resurrecting Bucky as the Winter Soldier (voiced by Jon Curry).
- Captain Marvel / Mar-Vell (voiced by Roger Craig Smith) is a Kree scientist who operates on Earth using a human disguise and the alias Walter Lawson, and is the replacement ruler of the Kree after helping the Avengers stop the Supreme Intelligence.
- Cassie Lang (voiced by Colleen O'Shaughnessey) is the daughter of Scott Lang.
- Corrina (voiced by Jennifer Hale) is Michael Korvac's wife. After Michael is driven insane by Kree experimentation and attacks the Avengers, Corrina reasons with him, prompting him to leave Earth.
- Doc Samson (voiced by Cam Clarke) is a colleague of Bruce Banner who was mutated by gamma radiation while working at the Cube, gaining superhuman strength and green hair. He later joins S.H.I.E.L.D. and is temporarily mind-controlled into serving the Red Skull.
- The Dora Milaje are a group of female warriors who protect Wakanda. They consist of Okoye and Nakia.
- Eitri (voiced by John DiMaggio) is an Asgardian dwarf and blacksmith who created Beta Ray Bill's hammer Stormbreaker.
- Falcon (voiced by Lance Reddick) is a bird-themed hero who the Red Skull brainwashed.
- The Fantastic Four are a quartet of superheroes and adventurers:
  - Mister Fantastic (voiced by Dee Bradley Baker) who possesses high intelligence and elasticity.
  - Invisible Woman (voiced by Erin Torpey) who can become invisible and generate force fields.
  - The Human Torch (voiced by David Kaufman) who can fly and generate fire.
  - The Thing (voiced by Fred Tatasciore) who possesses a rock-like body.
- Faradei (voiced by Troy Baker) is an Asgardian light elf and archer.
- The Guardians of the Galaxy are a group of intergalactic heroes:
  - Star-Lord (voiced by Steve Downes), a human gunfighter.
  - Adam Warlock (voiced by Kirk Thornton), an artificial alien with cosmic abilities.
  - Groot (voiced by Troy Baker), a tree-like alien who can manipulate plants.
  - Rocket Raccoon (voiced by Greg Ellis), a humanoid raccoon and gunfighter.
  - Quasar (voiced by Moira Quirk) who can manipulate energy via the Quantum Bands.
- H.E.R.B.I.E. is the Fantastic Four's robot companion.
- Heimdall (voiced by JB Blanc) is an Asgardian and the guardian of the Bifröst, a rainbow bridge that connects the nine realms.
- Henry Peter Gyrich (voiced by Jim Ward) is the director of S.W.O.R.D.
- The Howling Commandos are a military unit led by Jack Fury (voiced by Alex Désert) that operated during World War II. They consists of Dino Manelli, Dum Dum Dugan, Gabe Jones, Izzy Cohen, Pinky Pinkerton and Rebel Ralston.
- Huginn and Muninn are Odin's raven scouts.
- J. Jonah Jameson (voiced by J. K. Simmons) is an editor at the Daily Bugle who is strongly opposed to Spider-Man.
- N'Gassi (voiced by Kevin Michael Richardson) is a servant and colleague of Black Panther. He prevents T'Challa from interfering in T'Chaka's fight with Man-Ape to uphold tradition, leading to T'Chaka's death.
- Odin (voiced by Clancy Brown) is the ruler of Asgard and Thor's father.
- Peter Corbeau (voiced by Chris Cox) is a commander of S.W.O.R.D.
- Quake (voiced by Lacey Chabert) is a member of the Secret Warriors who possesses can generate seismic waves.
- Robbie Robertson (voiced by Troy Baker) is an editor at the Daily Bugle.
- Sif (voiced by Nika Futterman) is an Asgardian warrior and ally of Thor.
- Sydren (voiced by Troy Baker) is an alien member of S.W.O.R.D.
- Valkyrie (voiced by Colleen O'Shaughnessey) is the leader of the Valkyrior, a group of Asgardian warriors.
- The Warriors Three are a group of Asgardian warriors and allies of Thor. They consist of Fandral (voiced by Chris Cox), Volstagg (voiced by Fred Tatasciore), and the silent Hogun.

== Villains ==
=== Masters of Evil ===
- Baron Zemo (voiced by Robin Atkin Downes) is one of Captain America's archenemies, the original leader of Hydra during World War II, and the leader of the Masters of Evil in the present day.
- The Enchantress (voiced by Kari Wahlgren) is an Asgardian sorceress and enemy of Thor who founds the Masters of Evil on Loki's instructions.
- Skurge the Executioner is the Enchantress' Asgardian servant and axe-wielding bodyguard.
- The Abomination (voiced by Robin Atkin Downes) is a monstrous gamma-based villain and an enemy of the Hulk.
- Arnim Zola (voiced by Grant Moninger) is an ally of Zemo and a former member of Hydra who transferred his consciousness into a robotic body.
- Chemistro (voiced by Nolan North) is a criminal who can transmute elements with his alchemy gun.
- Crimson Dynamo (voiced by Chris Cox) is an enemy of Iron Man who wields an armored exosuit.
- Doughboy (voiced by Grant Moninger) is a dough-like creature created by Arnim Zola.
- Grey Gargoyle (voiced by Troy Baker) is a French villain who can petrify himself and others via touch.
- Living Laser (voiced by Nolan North) is an enemy of Iron Man who wields light-manipulating armor.
- Wonder Man (voiced by Phil LaMarr) is a businessman who is transformed by his brother, the Grim Reaper, and A.I.M. into a being of ionic energy. After his body destabilizes and dissipates, the Enchantress revives and blackmails him into joining the Masters of Evil.

=== Hydra ===
- Baron Strucker (voiced by Jim Ward) is the leader of Hydra in the present day. He wields the youth-draining Satan Claw gauntlet.
- The Grim Reaper (voiced by Lance Henriksen) is Baron Strucker's right-hand man and Wonder Man's brother. He is themed after his namesake and wields a cybernetic scythe.
- Viper / Madame Hydra (voiced by Vanessa Marshall) is a high-ranking member of Hydra and the leader of the Serpent Society.
- The Dreadnoughts are robots that serve Hydra.

=== Other villains ===
- Absorbing Man (voiced by Rick D. Wasserman) is a gamma-powered criminal who can absorb the properties of whatever he touches.
- Annihilus is the insectoid ruler of the Negative Zone.
- Bi-Beast is a two-headed android and an enemy of the Hulk.
- Blizzard (voiced by Troy Baker) is a criminal who wields ice-based weaponry.
- Crossfire (voiced by Neil Ross) is a gangster and the former criminal partner of Scott Lang. He is served by Big Ben Donovan, Cockroach Hamilton, Gideon Mace, Mangler, Piranha Jones, Scythe, Senor Muerte, and Spear.
- Doctor Doom (voiced by Lex Lang) is the monarch of Latveria and the archenemy of the Fantastic Four.
- Fenris (vocal effects provided by Fred Tatasciore) is an Asgardian wolf.
- Galactus is a cosmic entity who feeds on planets and antimatter.
- Glenn Talbot (voiced by Troy Baker) is a colonel and member of the Hulkbusters.
- Graviton (voiced by Fred Tatasciore) is a former S.H.I.E.L.D. physicist who gained gravity-based powers while attempting to recreate the super-soldier serum and was imprisoned in the Raft. His escape prompts the formation of the Avengers.
- Griffin is a chimeric villain resembling his namesake.
- Hela (voiced by Nika Futterman) is the ruler of Hel, the Norse underworld.
- The Heralds of Galactus are elemental entities and servants of Galactus who assist in his attempt to destroy Earth. They consist of the silent Firelord, Air-Walker and Stardust, and Terrax (voiced by Kevin Grevioux).
- Hoarfen is a wolf-like monster who Loki summons to battle the Avengers.
- Jocasta is an android created by Ultron to serve as his partner.
- Kalum Lo is a Kree commander.
- Kang the Conqueror (voiced by Jonathan Adams) is a time-traveling villain from the 41st century who blames Captain America for the destruction of his timeline and seeks revenge. He works with alternate universe versions of himself to displace the Avengers across time, but is defeated by the New Avengers.
- Karnilla (voiced by Kari Wahlgren) is the queen of the Norns.
- Klaw (voiced by Mark Hamill) is a mercenary who comes into conflict with the first Ant-Man while searching for vibranium. He and Man-Ape take over Wakanda before the Avengers arrive to stop them. During the battle, Klaw's sound emitter interacts with the vibranium and transforms him into an entity made of sound.
- The Leader (voiced by Jeffrey Combs) is an enemy of the Hulk who gained superhuman intelligence and an oversized head from exposure to gamma radiation.
- Loki (voiced by Graham McTavish) is the adoptive brother and archenemy of Thor. He is banished to the Isle of Silence, but works with the Enchantress to escape and attempt to conquer Asgard.
- Lucia von Bardas (voiced by Kirsten Potter) is a cyborg and associate of Doctor Doom.
- The Mad Thinker (voiced by Danny Mann) is a mad scientist who was imprisoned in the Big House.
- Malekith (voiced by Quinton Flynn) is a dark elf and enemy of Thor.
- Man-Ape (voiced by Kevin Michael Richardson) is an ape-themed villain and enemy of Black Panther. He and Klaw work together to take over Wakanda until Black Panther and the Avengers stop them.
- Mandrill (voiced by Fred Tatasciore) is an animalistic villain resembling his namesake who can generate mind-controlling pheromones.
- Michael Korvac (voiced by Troy Baker) is a human who gained powers from Kree experimentation. He attacks the Avengers and the Guardians of the Galaxy until his wife Corrina persuades him to leave Earth.
- MODOK (voiced by Wally Wingert) is a member of A.I.M. who possesses psychic abilities coupled with an oversized head that forces him to use a mobilized hoverchair for support.
- Professor Thorton (voiced by Tom Kane) is a member of Weapon X who infused Wolverine's body with adamantium.
- Purple Man (voiced by Brent Spiner) is a villain who was previously imprisoned in the Raft and can control minds.
- Radioactive Man is a villain who can generate radiation.
- Ravonna (voiced by Cindy Robinson) is Kang the Conqueror's lover who is rescued from the timeline's destruction. She is partially affected by the timeline's destruction and begins phasing out of existence, with Kang desperately seeking a cure.
- The Red Ghost is an enemy of the Fantastic Four who can become intangible and invisible. He is served by the Super-Apes, a group of superpowered primates.
- The Red Skull (voiced by Steve Blum) is one of Captain America's archenemies and a commander of Hydra during World War II who assumes the identity of U.S. Secretary Dell Rusk in the present day.
- Ronan the Accuser (voiced by Keith Szarabajka) is the Kree's grand accuser who travels to Earth to judge humanity's worth.
- The Scientist Supreme is the alias of two prominent members of A.I.M.: Valdemar Tykkio (voiced by Nolan North) and Lyle Getz (voiced by Kyle Hebert).
- Sentry-459 is a Kree sentry who was sent to Earth to assess humanity. It is equipped with a Nega-Bomb which is capable of destroying planets.
- The Serpent Society is a group of snake-themed criminals led by Viper. They consist of King Cobra (voiced by James C. Mathis III), Anaconda (voiced by Vanessa Marshall), Constrictor (voiced by Cam Clarke in the first season and Troy Baker in the second season), Rattler (voiced by Chris Cox), and the silent Bushmaster and Death Adder.
- The Skrulls are a reptilian alien species with shapeshifting abilities who initiated an invasion of Earth. They consists of Pitt'o Nili (voiced by Brian Bloom) who impersonated Captain America, Criti Noll, who impersonated Invisible Woman; and possesses the combined abilities of Hank Pym, Black Panther, Crimson Dynamo, the Hulk and Klaw, Veranke (voiced by E. G. Daily) who is the queen of the Skrulls, a Skrull who impersonated Clay Quartermain, and possesses the combined abilities of the Abomination, Whirlwind and Griffin, the Super-Skrull (voiced by Kyle Hebert) who possesses the combined abilities of the Fantastic Four, and other Skrulls, such as Rl'nnd, Skragg (voiced by Troy Baker), Chrell, Dro'ge (voiced by Rick D. Wasserman) and X'iv, who provided support.
- The Supreme Intelligence (voiced by David Kaye) is a disembodied intelligence that oversees the Kree empire.
- Surtur (voiced by Rick D. Wasserman) is an Asgardian fire demon.
- Technovore (voiced by Dwight Schultz) is an insect-like robot who was previously imprisoned in the Vault, and ultimately goes after Stark Tower's reactor.
- Thunderbolt Ross (voiced by Keith Ferguson) is a military general who pursues the Hulk as a threat, and later joins Code Red as the Red Hulk (voiced by Fred Tatasciore).
- The U-Foes are a group of gamma-powered villains and enemies of the Hulk. They consist of Vector (voiced by Cam Clarke) who can repel matter; Vapor (voiced by Colleen O'Shaughnessey) who can transform into gas; and the silent Ironclad and X-Ray who can respectively manipulate their density and generate radiation.
- Ulik (voiced by Troy Baker) is an Asgardian rock troll and an enemy of Thor.
- Ultimo is a giant robot and enemy of Iron Man.
- Ultron (voiced by Tom Kane) is a rogue artificial intelligence initially created by Hank Pym to serve as a benevolent peacekeeping program (voiced by Wally Wingert).
- Whiplash is a whip-wielding villainess and enemy of Iron Man.
- Whirlwind (voiced by Troy Baker) is a mutant with wind-based abilities, and an enemy of the Wasp and the first Ant-Man.
- The Wrecking Crew are a group of criminals and enemies of Thor who use destruction-based equipment. They consist of Wrecker (voiced by JB Blanc) who wields a crowbar; Bulldozer (voiced by James C. Mathis III) who wields a metallic helmet; Piledriver (voiced by Nolan North) who uses no weapon and instead relies on his superhuman strength; and Thunderball (voiced by Gary Anthony Williams) who wields a ball and chain.
- Ymir is a Frost Giant and an enemy of Thor.
- Yon-Rogg (voiced by Fred Tatasciore) is a Kree commander who sent the Kree Sentry to Earth.
- Zzzax is an electricity-based villain and an enemy of the Hulk.
