= Spider-Island =

2011 comic book storyline

- Cover to The Amazing Spider-Man #667. Art by Humberto Ramos.
- Publisher: Marvel Comics
- Publication date: August – November 2011
- Genre: Superhero
- Main character(s): Spider-Man; Jackal; Queen

Creative team
- Writer: Dan Slott
- Artist: Humberto Ramos
- Penciller: Stefano Caselli
- Inker: Stefano Caselli
- Letterer: Joe Caramagna
- Colorist: Marte Gracia
- Editor: Stephen Wacker

Spider-Island is a 2011 comic book storyline starting in The Amazing Spider-Man and crossing over into other comic books published by Marvel Comics, most of which were limited series or one-shots specifically for this storyline. The main plot involves the inhabitants of Manhattan Island mysteriously gaining powers similar to Spider-Man. It features the return of the Jackal and the Queen (Adrianna "Ana" Soria) to the Marvel Universe and laid the ground work for the second volume of the Scarlet Spider series. The main story overall received positive reviews, with critics praising its action, humor, style, and plot.

== Plot ==
=== Infested ===
"Infested" was a series of six back-up stories that were at the end of regular issues of The Amazing Spider-Man. They were in issues #659, 660, and 662–665. These stories featured the Jackal and his experiments that led to the "Spider-Island" story. These were compiled in a comic book reprint called Amazing Spider-Man: Infested, which was released on August 31.

=== Spider-Island ===
The prologue outlines Peter Parker's life up to the start of Spider-Island. He is seen effortlessly neutralizing a robbery by Hydro-Man, as well as stopping a normal robbery. He puts in some time at Horizon Labs; finally, he visits Shang-Chi, his martial arts mentor who is teaching him "The Way of the Spider", as seen in the Free Comic Book Day edition of The Amazing Spider-Man. Madame Web warns Spider-Man of the events that are to come but he dismisses this as nonsense. Meanwhile, the Jackal is seen recruiting spider-powered criminals for his project along with a severely mutated Kaine, now called Tarantula. He has a large secret lab in which clones of Miles Warren are seen to be working. The Jackal has a mysterious female benefactor called the Spider Queen.

Peter's girlfriend, Carlie Cooper, shows him she has spider-powers. He and Carlie hear a news report telling of several hundred New Yorkers who have manifested spider-powers. The Jackal is behind the disturbance, as he has collected several prominent crime figures with spider-powers and given them Spider-Man outfits. The Avengers attempt to defend the city against spider-powered hooligans.

Although Shang-Chi confirms Spider-Man's identity to the other heroes, he is nevertheless ordered to stay out of the fight due to the inability to distinguish him from the other Spider-Men. Inspired by a conversation with Mary Jane, Peter is able to rally various other New Yorkers to help him stop the villainous Spider-Men by posing as another random spider-powered citizen like them. As Anti-Venom works on curing various Spider-People of their powers, Madame Web reflects on the need for both Agent Venom and Anti-Venom to fix the Spider-Island problem. Meanwhile, Carlie and Peter attempt to investigate the Jackal's lab, reasoning that he is the most likely candidate to have caused this event, unaware that they are being watched. Jackal is seen working on the Spider-King by filling with tiny spider embryos.

Horizon Labs works with Reed Richards to find a cure for the spider-powered people while the Avengers and other heroes try to keep Manhattan quarantined. While at an abandoned lab at Empire State University, Peter and Carlie are attacked by Chance, Scorcher, and White Rabbit, who all have spider powers. When White Rabbit attacks Carlie, Peter uses some moves he learned from Shang-Chi to knock out the villains. Carlie takes the villains to the precinct and tells Peter that she wants to have a talk with him and Spider-Man, to Peter's dismay. Jackal has been watching them and tells Tarantula to study the tape of the fight as he will soon be tested. The Avengers close off Manhattan keeping everyone in the city. Reed Richards develops a vaccine that can keep people from gaining spider powers, but does not cure people who already have them. As J. Jonah Jameson is about to get the vaccine, Reed tells him he has been infected. Anti-Venom continues to cure the victims of Manhattan, while Madame Web passes out from too many spiders accessing the web of life. Carlie is told that Spider-Man is waiting for her at the top of her precinct. Carlie and Spider-Man head to take down another spider-powered villain as Carlie becomes suspicious of where Peter is. When they arrive at the scene, they find a six-armed Shocker. Shocker reveals that he wants money so that Mad Thinker can cure him. Shocker then pulls off his mask to show that he is slowly mutating into a spider-like creature. Just as Spider-Man tries to piece everything together, Carlie begins to mutate. The Spider-Queen tells the Jackal that all the infected people of Manhattan are beginning to mutate, and New York will soon belong to her.

Mary Jane Watson evades the citizens who have been transformed into spider-like creatures. When Spider-Man tries to get a mutated Carlie to Mister Fantastic, more spider-like creatures begin to appear, making it hard to find out which one is Carlie. As Jameson ends up becoming a spider-like creature and defeats a Spider-Slayer, the Spider-Queen uses her Web of Life to control the spider-like creatures. Mary Jane also develops spider powers, while Madame Web loses her precognition.

Despite Jackal's contrary advice, Reed Richards and Horizon Labs manage to develop a serum from Anti-Venom's symbiotic antibodies, able to kill the Spider-Virus and instantly reverse the mutations. The Spider Queen sends Tarantula to break into Peter's personal lab. Peter discovers the break in and stops Tarantula from poisoning the serum. As Tarantula, now more physically powerful and still enabled with a functioning Spider-Sense, starts gaining the upper hand, Reed Richards mentions to the Horizon Labs scientists how Spider-Man lost his special sense. The Horizon Labs scientists manage to jury-rig a counter-frequency, restoring Peter's Spider-Sense to an enhanced level (due to Shang-Chi's kung fu training being merged to his reflexes). Now fully empowered, Peter bests Tarantula, drowning him in a pool of serum. Tarantula emerges from the pool with his mutation gone and his clone degeneration reversed. The now healthy Kaine shakes off Spider Queen's mind control and offers to help Peter. Meanwhile, a side effect of the counterfrequency used on Peter restores Madame Web's and Spider Queen's connection to the Web of Life. Spider-Queen uses an evolved version of her sonic scream to kill Jackal (later revealed as yet another clone), and realizes she has been given the whole powers of the Web, becoming a Spider-Goddess.

By the time Captain America and Venom reach the Spider Queen, she uses her enhanced powers to evolve into a massive spiderlike creature of enormous strength, siphoning new power from every individual infected by the Spider-Virus. Mary Jane discovers her long-term relationship with Peter has given her a partial immunity to the Spider-Virus, and uses her newly acquired spider powers to reach the Horizon Labs and reunite with Peter. Meanwhile, Peter has Kaine outfitted with the Spider-Armor from "Big Time", which deflects Spider Queen's sonic scream. Kaine, Mary Jane and Spider-Man join the fight, as the whole heroic community of New York tries to prevent Spider Queen and Madame Web's apocalyptic prophecy. When Spider-Man seems about to lose, Mary Jane reminds him that as powerful as Spider-Man could be, she had always trusted the brain power of Peter the scientist. Leaving Kaine behind to fight with the other heroes, Spider-Man and Mary Jane flee to the police precinct and steal Doctor Octopus' Octobots, which Spider-Man converts into a small army of Spider-Slayers, each one carrying a dose of the cure. While Mary Jane bravely defends him, Peter uses the antenna on the Empire State Building to reverse the mutation of a large part of New York's population at once. Emboldened by Spider-Man's example and seeing Spider-Queen losing her powers, Kaine has himself thrown in her mouth using the Spider-Armor to deflect the sonic scream and spider-stingers (similar to the ones held by Peter Parker during The Other) to slay the Spider Queen. While Madame Web claims that her prophecy entailing "The Hand of Spider-Man" felling the Queen must had been wrong, Kaine (now fully reconciled with Peter) claims that he was merely an executor and Spider-Man's bravery and quick thinking enabled him to deal the final blow. The Jackal, in disguise as part of Damage Control, harvests some of the deceased Queen's marrow for use in future cloning experiments. Atop the Empire State Building, Mary Jane admits her love for Peter, but he does not hear her. They stay there to rest, musing about the aftereffects of having the whole of New York walk a mile in Spider-Man's shoes.

The following day, Peter discovers from Doctor Strange that the psychic blindspot created to protect his secret identity has now been compromised. This was due to Peter revealing his spider-powers in a viral video to encourage other New Yorkers to use their new spider-powers for good. As a result of this, Carlie is able to deduce who Peter actually is. Tired of being lied to, Carlie accuses Peter of being a mask for his "true self" and breaks up with him. Peter locates Mary Jane and administers the antidote to her, albeit with some reluctance on her part. The two bond with each other over their recent experiences. Mary Jane tells Peter to look at the Empire State Building, onto which is projected a red and blue color scheme. This is the citizens of New York's way of saying "thank you" to Spider-Man for his heroic deeds during the crisis.

=== Spider-Island: Amazing Spider-Girl ===
As Anya Corazon tries to figure out her past, she and her friend Rocky are attacked by the Sisterhood of the Wasp (a misguided monster sect who are "fabled enemies of the spiders") who are targeting Anya. Anya gets Rocky to safety and changes into Spider-Girl. She ends up getting an unlikely ally in the Hobgoblin, who flies her to Kingpin. When Spider-Girl asks why Kingpin wants her help, Kingpin reveals that he and his men have developed spider powers, and are being targeted by the Sisterhood of the Wasp. He tells Spider-Girl where he has found the location of the Central Wasp Nest. Madame Web tells Spider-Girl she will need to team up with her "enemy" when the Sisterhood's leader All-Mother plans to release a poison that will kill anyone with spider powers. Spider-Girl and the Hand end up fighting the soldiers of the Sisterhood of the Wasp to keep them from releasing the poison. When the soldiers take to the skies, they are shot down by the Hand archers. Spider-Girl rushes to take down the All-Mother, but runs into Madame Web. She tells Spider-Girl she still needs to team up with her "enemy". Spider-Girl realizes she has to team up with the All-Mother to halt the mob of mutated New York natives. They are successful. Hobgoblin does not acknowledge the end of battle and attacks the All-Mother. This angers the Kingpin, but Spider-Girl convinces him to let Hobgoblin live. The story ends with Spider-Girl getting administered the cure, though it is seen that she still has retained some spider powers when she swings away from the Kingpin.

=== Spider-Island: Avengers ===
When the infestation of Manhattan began, Ms. Marvel, Jessica Jones, and Hawkeye survey the people with spider powers. When Jessica calls up Squirrel Girl on the status of her daughter Danielle, Squirrel Girl discovers that Danielle has developed spider powers. Frog-Man witnesses terrorists with spider powers attacking the United Nations and gains the assistance, and eventual grudging respect, of Ms. Marvel, Jessica, and Hawkeye.

=== Spider-Island: Cloak and Dagger ===
When Cloak and Dagger see an advertisement of them on a billboard, Cloak tells Dagger they would be able to come to anyone's services. They are approached by the New Avengers who are on their way to handle a riot involving people with spider-powers. While stopping the people dressed as Spider-Man, Cloak and Dagger recall the time they worked for Norman Osborn's Dark X-Men. Mister Negative is told of a prophecy that he is destined to be killed by Dagger. Negative captures Dagger and corrupts her with his negative touch. This turns Dagger into a dark version of herself who must consume all light and life. The corrupted Dagger uses her powers to plunge Chinatown into darkness. Tyrone begs Negative to save her; Negative uses his negative touch on Cloak, altering his Darkforce powers into that of Dagger's. After Cloak and Dagger heal themselves and Chinatown, both of them conclude that they must deal with their altered powers themselves.

=== Spider-Island: Deadly Foes ===
Norah Winters is disappointed when she sees Betty Brant has beaten her to the Spider-Island story. Unbeknownst to Norah, she is being spied upon by Phil Urich who is jealous of her relationship with Randy Robertson. This causes Phil to become Hobgoblin and go after her. At Potter's Field, Jackal finds Kaine emerging from his grave following the events of the Grim Hunt. Jackal manages to knock out Kaine and drag him back to his lair, where he turns him into a spider monster.

=== Spider-Island: Deadly Hands of Kung Fu ===
Shang-Chi is told by Madame Web that people with spider powers are running amok in Manhattan. When he sees Iron Fist fighting the Spider-Man imposters and Peter Parker nearby, Shang-Chi springs into action. Bride of Nine Spiders inexplicably starts attacking and abducting her teammates in the Immortal Weapons. When trying to figure out what his recurring dream means, Shang-Chi learns from Silver Sable that she has found possible locations in Manhattan for Bride of Nine Spider's lair. Although Shang-Chi manages to defeat Bride of Nine Spiders and frees Iron Fist, he discovers that the person behind this is the demon Ai Apaec who seeks to feed off the Immortal Weapons. As Shang-Chi fights Ai Apaec, Iron Fist scrambles to free the other Immortal Weapons. Shang-Chi mutates into a spider during the battle as a result of the infection, but Iron Fist uses his Chi force to cure Shang-Chi, leaving Iron Fist in a weakened state. After making sure Iron Fist and the rest of the Immortal Weapons are evacuated, Shang-Chi collapses the mansion hide-out on Ai Apaec, leaving him immobilized for the Avengers to put back into custody.

=== Spider-Island: Heroes for Hire ===
Heroes for Hire is called in to help with the quarantine of Manhattan. They end up fighting spider-powered versions of Flashmob (Chemistro, Cheshire Cat, Comanche, Cockroach Hamilton, Mr. Fish, Nightshade, and Spear) and Cottonmouth when they try to leave Manhattan.

=== Spider-Island: Spider-Woman ===
When the civilians who gained spider powers start to turn into half-spider creatures, Spider-Woman is fighting some of them while Mister Fantastic states in the communication that Hydra once used a corrupted version of her DNA on Alicia Masters as part of their super-soldier experiment. Mister Fantastic then has Spider-Woman look for Alicia Masters.

=== Herc ===
The Greek owners/operators of the bar where Hercules works have fled the dangers of New York City and returned to Greece, leaving Hercules in charge. He befriends an elderly African man named A. Nancy who loves stories. Herc is bitten by a bed bug that gives him spider powers, which he uses to fight crime. The Queen of Spider Island reveals herself to Herc and makes him her slave. She sends Spider-Herc against the X-Men, who are in town after fighting lizard people in the sewers. They try to reason with him, but he attacks them with the Sword of Peleus. Due to the mutagenic properties of Spider-Man's powers, Spider-Herc mutates into Herc-Spider. Suddenly the X-Men are trapped in a magic web and the Greek goddess Arachne appears. Instead of fighting, it is revealed that Arachne is very attracted to Herc's new form and they embrace while the X-Men are forced to watch. While Arachne is preoccupied, A. Nancy breaks into her home and steals her mythical tapestry. He reveals himself as the African spider god Anansi, a collector of stories.

=== Venom ===
When the people of Manhattan start developing spider-powers, Venom is sent in to capture a spider-like beast that is fighting Firestar and Gravity. Venom manages to capture the Spider-King and discovers that he is Steve Rogers enslaved. Venom disguises himself as the Spider-King to track the infestation to its source. The Queen and Jackal send him to kill Anti-Venom because he is curing people who have gained spider-powers, but his superiors order him to take him to Mister Fantastic to help develop a cure. Flash and the Venom symbiote fight each other because Flash wants to bring Anti-Venom to Mister Fantastic and the symbiote wants to kill Anti-Venom for previously rejecting it. Flash wins the fight and delivers Anti-Venom to Mister Fantastic. At Project Rebirth, the scientists there are able to replicate the Anti-Venom cure using samples from Venom which is tested on the Spider-King. As Flash finally reaches the hospital, Betty gives him a letter that was written by his late father before Flash is called back into action. He attacks the Queen and is backed up by Rogers later in the battle. They take down the Queen, but she transforms into a bigger, stronger spider form and is taken down by Venom, Rogers, Spider-Man, Kaine, and the assistance of the Avengers.

== List of issues ==
- The Amazing Spider-Man #659–660, 662–673
- Black Panther: The Most Dangerous Man Alive #524
- Herc #7–8
- Spider-Island: The Amazing Spider-Girl #1–3
- Spider-Island: Avengers #1
- Spider Island: Cloak and Dagger #1–3
- Spider-Island: Daily Bugle #1(free preview)
- Spider-Island: Deadly Foes #1
- Spider-Island: Deadly Hands of Kung Fu #1–3
- Spider-Island: Heroes for Hire #1
- Spider-Island: I Love New York City #1
- Spider-Island: Spider-Woman #1
- Venom vol. 2 #6–8

== Collected editions ==
Title	Material collected	Format	Pages	Released	ISBN
Spider-Island	Amazing Spider-Man #666-673; Venom #6-8; Spider-Island: Deadly Foes; Amazing Spider-Man #659-660, #662-665 ("Infested Stories")	OHC	376	25 Jan 2012	978-0785151043
Spider-Island	Amazing Spider-Man #666-673; Venom #6-8; Spider-Island: Deadly Foes; Amazing Spider-Man #659-660, #662-665 ("Infested Stories")	TPB	376	3 Oct 2012	978-0785151050
Spider-Man: Spider-Island Companion	Spider-Island: The Amazing Spider-Girl #1-3, Spider-Island: Cloak & Dagger #1-3, Spider-Island: Deadly Hands of Kung Fu #1-3, Herc #7-8, Spider-Island: Avengers #1, Spider-Island: Spider-Woman #1, Black Panther #524, Spider-Island: Heroes for Hire #1, Spider-Island Spotlight #1	424	OHC	29 Feb 2012	978-0785162285
Spider-Man: Spider-Island Companion	Spider-Island: The Amazing Spider-Girl #1-3, Spider-Island: Cloak & Dagger #1-3, Spider-Island: Deadly Hands of Kung Fu #1-3, Herc #7-8, Spider-Island: Avengers #1, Spider-Island: Spider-Woman #1, Black Panther #524, Spider-Island: Heroes for Hire #1, Spider-Island Spotlight #1	360	TPB	29 Oct 2012	978-0785162292
Spider-Island: Warzones!	Spider-Island #1-5	120	TPB	26 Nov 2015	978-0785198857

== Secret Wars (2015) ==
As part of the 2015 Secret Wars storyline, a Spider-Island miniseries took place on the Battleworld domain of the same name. The Spider-Island domain was set in an alternate universe where the Spider-Queen triumphed at the end of the 2011 "Spider-Island" storyline.

== Reception ==
USA Today said the "Spider-Island" story was Dan Slott's "most ambitious and sprawling" story yet.

- The Amazing Spider-Man #667 received a rating of 6.5 out of 10 from IGN, and a rating of 4.0 out of 5 from Comic Book Resources.
- The Amazing Spider-Man #668 received a rating of 7.5 out of 10 from IGN, and a rating of 3.5 out of 5 from Comic Book Resources.
- The Amazing Spider-Man #669 received a rating of 7.5 out of 10 from IGN, and a rating of 4.0 out of 5 from Comic Book Resources.
- The Amazing Spider-Man #670 received a rating of 8.5 out of 10 from IGN, and a rating of 9.5 out of 10 from CraveOnline.
- The Amazing Spider-Man #671 received a rating of 6.5 out of 10 from IGN, and a rating of 2.0 out of 5 from Comic Book Resources.
- The Amazing Spider-Man #672 received a rating of 8.5 out of 10 from IGN, and a rating of 2.5 out of 5 from Comic Book Resources.
- The Amazing Spider-Man #673 received a rating of 7.5 out of 10 from IGN, and a rating of 4.5 out of 5 from Comic Book Resources.
- Black Panther: The Most Dangerous Man Alive #524 received a rating of 4.5 out of 5 from Comic Book Resources, and a rating of 2.5 out of 5 from World of Black Heroes.
- Spider-Island: Avengers received a rating of 8.0 out of 10 from IGN, and a rating of 4.0 out of 5 from Comic Book Resources.
- Spider-Island: The Amazing Spider-Girl #1 received a rating of 7.0 out of 10 from IGN, and a rating of 3.0 out of 5 from Comic Book Resources.
- Spider-Island: The Amazing Spider-Girl #2 received a rating of 7.0 out of 10 from IGN, and a rating of 4.0 out of 5 from Spider-Man Crawlspace.
- Spider-Island: The Amazing Spider-Girl #3 received a rating of 7.5 out of 10 from IGN, and a rating of 4.0 out of 5 from Spider-Man Crawlspace.
- Spider-Island: Cloak & Dagger #1 received a rating of 8.5 out of 10 from IGN, and a rating of 4.5 out of 5 from Comic Book Resources.
- Spider-Island: Cloak & Dagger #2 received a rating of 7.5 out of 10 from IGN, and a rating of 5 out of 5 from Spider-Man Crawlspace.
- Spider-Island: Cloak & Dagger #3 received a rating of 8.5 out of 10 from IGN, and a rating of 6 [sic] out of 5 from Spider-Man Crawlspace.
- Spider-Island: Deadly Foes received a rating of 6.5 out of 10 from IGN, and a rating of 2.5 out of 5 from Spider-Man Crawlspace.
- Spider-Island: Heroes for Hire received a rating of 2.0 out of 5 from Comic Book Resources, and a rating of 2.5 out of 5 from World of Black Heroes.
- Spider-Island: Spider-Woman received a rating of 5.5 out of 10 from IGN, and a rating of 3.0 out of 5 from Comic Book Resources.
- Venom vol. 2 #6 received a rating of 7.5 out of 10 from IGN, and a rating of 3.5 out of 5 from Comic Book Resources.
- Venom vol. 2 #7 received a rating of 8.5 out of 10 from IGN, and a rating of 4.0 out of 5 from Comic Book Resources.
- Venom vol. 2 #8 received a rating of 7.5 out of 10 from IGN, and a rating of 2.5 out of 5 from Spider-Man Crawlspace.

According to Comic Book Roundup, Amazing Spider-Man Issue 667 received an average score of 7.7 out of 10 based on 9 reviews.

According to Comic Book Roundup, Issue 668 received an average score of 8 out of 10 based on 8 reviews.

According to Comic Book Roundup, Issue 669 received a score of 7.4 out of 10 based on 5 reviews.

According to Comic Book Roundup, Issue 670 received a score of 7.6 out of 10 based on 4 reviews.

According to Comic Book Roundup, Issue 671 received a score of 6.9 out of 10 based on 6 reviews.

According to Comic Book Roundup, Issue 672 received a score of 8 out of 10 based on 7 reviews.

According to Comic Book Roundup, Issue 673 received a score of 8.9 out of 10 based on 10 reviews.

== In other media ==
=== Television ===
- Elements of the Spider-Island and Maximum Carnage storylines are adapted in the Ultimate Spider-Man episode "The Symbiote Saga".
- The Spider-Island arc is adapted in the Spider-Man (2017) episode of the same name, with Norman Osborn as the Spider-King and the Jackal as the sole leader of the incident.

=== Video games ===
- The Spider-Island storyline is featured in the Spider-Man Unlimited video game along with the storyline's various Spider characters and the Secret Wars 2015 storyline.
