= Mr. Fish =

- Mr. Fish as seen on the cover of Luke Cage, Power Man #29.

Publication information
- Publisher: Marvel Comics
- First appearance: Luke Cage, Power Man #29 (April 1975)
- Created by: Bill Mantlo; George Tuska

In-story information
- Alter ego: Mortimer George Norris; Bill Norris
- Species: Human mutate
- Team affiliations: (Mortimer): Maggia (Bill): Flashmob
- Abilities: Amphibious physiology Enhanced strength

Mr. Fish is the name of two supervillains appearing in American comic books published by Marvel Comics. Both versions are enemies of Luke Cage.

The first version of the character, Mortimer Norris, was a criminal who mutated into a fish-like form after being exposed to radioactive waste. Norris was seemingly killed off in his first appearance, but was revealed to have survived in Power Man and Iron Fist (2017). The second version is Bill Norris, Norris's similarly mutated brother.

== Publication history ==
The Mortimer Norris incarnation of Mr. Fish first appeared in Luke Cage, Power Man #29 (April 1975), and was created by writer Bill Mantlo and artist George Tuska. Initially, Luke Cage, Power Man #29 was intended to continue a storyline from the 28th issue. The continuation of that story was running late. Because of these deadline considerations, the splash page admits, this fill-in story, "No One Laughs at Mr. Fish", was created to ensure #29 hit the stands on schedule.

The Bill Morris incarnation of Mr. Fish first appeared in Daughters of the Dragon #4 (April 2006), and was created by Justin Gray, Jimmy Palmiotti, and Khari Evans.

== Fictional character biography ==
=== Mortimer Norris ===
Mortimer Norris is a crook who discovers stolen radioactive material while on a job. The exposure makes him dizzy and causes him to fall into the East River. Norris is mutated into an amphibious fish-man with enhanced strength and establishes a Maggia branch in his area, aided by a group of thugs and his second-in-command, a dwarf named Shrike. As Mr. Fish, Norris battles Luke Cage and utilizes a concussive ray gun that knocks him out. Despite Shrike's advice to finish Cage off before he awakens, Mr. Fish waits until Cage wakes up so that he can recount his origin and master plan. Cage makes short work of Mr. Fish's men. In a desperate move, Mr. Fish rushes towards Cage with a steel girder, but Cage dodges and Mr. Fish falls off the building, seemingly dying on impact. Mr. Fish appeared alive in the All-New, All-Different Marvel relaunch.

=== Bill Norris ===
The second Mr. Fish is Bill Norris, Mortimer's similarly-mutated brother. He joins the Flashmob, a group of former opponents of Luke Cage, during the Shadowland storyline. The assemblage of villains confront the new Power Man (Victor Alvarez), and are remanded to Ryker's Island after being defeated by Power Man and Iron Fist. A few members of the Flashmob, including Mr. Fish, are bailed out by Big Ben Donovan.

== Powers and abilities ==
Mr. Fish has enhanced strength and a fish-like physiology that enables him to survive on land and in water.

== In other media ==
Mortimer Norris appears in the Luke Cage episode "Wig Out", portrayed by Hakim Callender. This version is a human crime lord with no superhuman abilities.
