= Cockroach Hamilton =

Fictional Marvel supervillain

Publication information
- Publisher: Marvel Comics
- First appearance: Luke Cage, Power Man #28 (December 1975)
- Created by: Don McGregor; George Tuska; Vinnie Colletta

In-story information
- Full name: Dontrell Hamilton
- Species: Human
- Team affiliations: Flashmob; Pride
- Notable aliases: Cockroach; Roach
- Abilities: Skilled marksman

Dontrell "Cockroach" Hamilton is the name of a supervillain appearing in American comic books published by Marvel Comics. The character is most closely related to Luke Cage, one of the early black Marvel superheroes.

Dorian Crossmon Missick portrayed Cockroach Hamilton in the second season of the Marvel Cinematic Universe (MCU) / Netflix series Luke Cage.

== Publication history ==
The character first appeared in Luke Cage, Power Man #28 (December 1975), produced by Don McGregor, George Tuska, and Vinnie Colletta.

== Fictional character biography ==
Growing up in Harlem, Dontrell Hamilton was petrified by nocturnal noises. However, over time, he gradually becomes accustomed to them as well as to the cockroaches that infested his home. These early experiences lead to an affinity for cockroaches and "Cheese Snipz".

Later in life, Hamilton turns to a life of crime, becoming a mob enforcer for Ray "Piranha" Jones. While investigating Hamilton, Power Man is attacked by Hamilton and Jones's men at the Harlem River docks. Power Man is eventually knocked out and carried back to Jones's penthouse, but breaks free and attacks Jones. Power Man and Jones fall into a pool of piranhas allowing Hamilton to seal them in and escape.

Hamilton and Jones escape conviction and move to Stamford, Connecticut. They demand protection money from the locals, who refuse, but are eventually accepted into the community. When Terror Inc. is hired by an unknown party to kill Jones, Hamilton cannot defend him because his custom shotgun keeps jamming. Upon examining the information from the shotgun cartridges, Terror Inc. realizes that Jones hired them. Terror Inc. saves Jones from the mobsters and the arriving Punisher as Hamilton chases after Terror Inc. in their cars, with Terror Inc. ultimately killing Jones.

During the Shadowland storyline, Hamilton appears as a member of Nightshade's Flashmob and attacks Victor Alvarez. Hamilton fires on Alvarez until his gun is compressed by Luke Cage. The Flashmob is arrested and taken to Ryker's Island, but Big Ben Donovan secures Hamilton's release.

Luke Cage has Hamilton assist with investigating the "Preemptive Strike" by having him consult with criminals like Piranha Jones. After discovering that the Preemptive Strike work for Alex Wilder, Hamilton betrays the Heroes for Hire and joins Wilder's New Pride alongside Black Mariah, Cottonmouth, and Gamecock.

== Powers and abilities ==
Dontrell Hamilton has no superpowers, but is a skilled marksman who uses advanced pieces of artillery. His first weapon was a six-barreled shotgun built by himself named "Josh".

== Other versions ==
=== Earth-X ===
An alternate universe version of Cockroach Hamilton appears in Earth X, where he has died under unspecified circumstances.

=== House of M ===
An alternate universe version of Cockroach Hamilton appears in House of M. This version is a mutant who possesses an insectoid appearance.

== In other media ==
- Cockroach Hamilton makes a non-speaking appearance in The Avengers: Earth's Mightiest Heroes episode "To Steal an Ant-Man" as a member of William Cross' gang.
- Cockroach Hamilton appears in the second season of Luke Cage, portrayed by Dorian Missick. This version is a petty criminal who runs an off-the-books casino and was recently released from prison with help from corrupt NYPD Detective Rafael Scarfe. Additionally, Hamilton is physically abusive towards his girlfriend Andrea "Drea" Powell and her son CJ. After running afoul of Luke Cage, Hamilton injures him with help from a neighbor named Josh. Struggling with anger issues, Cage seeks vengeance and severely beats Hamilton after he abuses his family once more. Hamilton subsequently sues Cage for his injuries and hires Benjamin Donovan to represent him in court. Hamilton is later killed by Bushmaster.
