= Thunderbolt (Marvel Comics) =

Thunderbolt is the name of two fictional characters appearing in American comic books published by Marvel Comics.

== Publication history ==
The William Carver version of Thunderbolt first appeared in Daredevil #69 and was created by Roy Thomas, Gene Colan, and Syd Shores.

The Luis Barrett version of Thunderbolt first appeared in Incredible Hulk Annual #17 and was created by Gary Barnum, John Stanisci, and Tim Dzon.

== Fictional character biography ==
=== William Carver ===
Thunderbolt

Publication information
- Publisher: Marvel Comics
- First appearance: Daredevil #69 (Oct 1970) (as Thunderbolt): Power Man #41
- Created by: Roy Thomas; Gene Colan; Syd Shores

In-story information
- Alter ego: William Carver
- Species: Human
- Abilities: Superhuman speed and reflexes

William Carver was born in Harlem, New York. Returning to Harlem after military service, William is approached by several members of a local street gang named the Thunderbolts. The Thunderbolts are eager to have William in their group for his military training. William refuses and becomes an assistant district attorney under then-district attorney Franklin Nelson. When Nelson learns of William's encounter with the Thunderbolts gang, he instructs William to infiltrate them to gather enough information about their illegal activities to shut them down. William helps gather evidence sufficient to send several gang members to prison.

Months later, William's younger brother Lonnie is shot and killed in front of him. At Lonnie's funeral, William spots Lonnie's murderer and chases him through the cemetery. As the two battle, a bolt of lightning hits them, killing the sniper instantly. William is saved by an experimental cobalt radiation treatment, giving him superhuman speed and reflexes. William becomes a costumed crime-fighter, calling himself Thunderbolt after the Thunderbolts gang, and tries to discover who had ordered Lonnie's assassination.

William soon discovers that his aging process has been accelerated, causing him to age at a rate of several years per week. William tracks down his old ally Power Man and Power Man's ally Iron Fist to help him find Lonnie's killer. They discovered that it had been attorney Big Ben Donovan, whose younger brother Paul was one of the Thunderbolts gang members who William sent to prison. After confessing to his crime, Big Ben Donovan pulls a gun on Thunderbolt. As Donovan and Thunderbolt battle, the gun goes off and inadvertently hits Donovan. Thunderbolt dies from his rapid aging, content that his brother's murder has been avenged.

=== Luis Barrett ===
Thunderbolt

Publication information
- Publisher: Marvel Comics
- First appearance: Incredible Hulk Annual #17 (1991)
- Created by: Gary Barnum; John Stanisci; Tim Dzon

In-story information
- Alter ego: Luis Barrett
- Species: Human
- Abilities: Superhuman speed

Luis Barrett obtained superhuman speed through unknown means while in high school. He came from a poor family and knew that he would not obtain a scholarship after he graduated. Justin Hammer later learns of Luis' powers and sends Barrier, Blacklash, and Ringer to bring Luis to him. Using his business connections, Hammer obtains William Carver's Thunderbolt costume, gives it to Luis, and convinces him to work for him in exchange for funding his college scholarship. When members of the Pantheon warn Luis of Hammer's intentions, Luis turns against Hammer. Luis is left without the means to go to college, but Ulysses observes that he is now on the right track.

Luis is considered as a "potential recruit" for the Initiative program.

== Powers and abilities ==
The William Carver version of Thunderbolt had superhuman speed and quick reflexes. The visor of his costume can produce an intense blinding light which he would use as a last resort.

The Luis Barrett version of Thunderbolt has superhuman speed.
