= Shades (comics) =

- Shades as seen in Shadowland: Power Man #1.

Publication information
- Publisher: Marvel Comics
- First appearance: Luke Cage, Hero for Hire #1 (June 1972)
- Created by: Archie Goodwin; George Tuska

In-story information
- Full name: Hernan Alvarez
- Species: Human
- Abilities: Hand-to-hand combat

Hernan "Shades" Alvarez is a supervillain appearing in American comic books published by Marvel Comics. He is the father of Victor Alvarez and is frequently seen with his partner-in-crime Comanche.

Theo Rossi portrayed Shades in the Marvel Cinematic Universe series Luke Cage (2016-2018).

== Publication history ==
Shades first appeared in Luke Cage, Hero for Hire #1 and was created by Archie Goodwin and George Tuska.

== Fictional character biography ==
Shades was raised in Harlem. During his youth, Shades was involved with a woman named Reina Alvarez, with whom he had a son named Victor Alvarez.

Shades joins a gang called the Rivals alongside Carl Lucas, Willis Stryker, and Comanche. Shades and Comanche are later arrested and sentenced to Seagate Prison, where they are tortured by prison guard Albert Rackham. After several years, Shades and Comanche escape from Seagate and decide to take revenge on Rickham. Shades and Comanche try to get Luke Cage to help them in their plot, only to learn that he has gone straight. Shades and Comanche become hoodlums-for-hire, often clashing with Cage and Iron Fist.

Some time later, Shades and Comanche are hired by Ward Meachum, who respectively gives them a visor that shoots energy blasts and a set of trick arrows. Luke Cage and Iron Fist track Shades and Comanche to the George Washington Bridge, where they learn about their employer. Cage and Iron Fist manage to defeat Shades and Comanche as the police arrive.

During the 2010 "Shadowland" storyline, Shades appears to have gone straight and separated from Comanche. When in Hell's Kitchen, Shades becomes a community organizer, working with his son Victor. Shades is later killed in an explosion caused by Bullseye, while Victor survives.

== Powers and abilities ==
Shades is an expert at hand-to-hand combat.

=== Equipment ===
Shades received a special visor from Ward Meachum that shoots energy blasts.

== In other media ==
Theo Rossi as Shades in the television series Luke Cage.

Shades appears in Luke Cage, portrayed by Theo Rossi. This version's nickname comes from his signature pair of Ray-Ban sunglasses. In his youth, Shades was a runaway until he was taken in by crime lord Maybelline "Mama Mabel" Stokes and worked with her grandson Cornell "Cottonmouth" Stokes' gang until he was sent to Seagate Prison, where he entered a same-sex relationship with his best friend, Darius "Comanche" Jones. While in Seagate, Shades and Comanche became enforcers for warden Albert Rackham. In the first season, Shades returns to New York and becomes Willis Stryker's right-hand man before the latter sends him to assist Cottonmouth and Mariah Dillard. Following Cottonmouth's death, Shades frames Stryker for Cottonmouth's murder, helps Dillard send Luke Cage to prison, becomes her lover, and helps her take over Cottonmouth's criminal empire. In the second season, Shades reunites with Comanche while he and Dillard prepare to retire from crime and transition to insider trading. Shade later turns himself in and takes police immunity in exchange for working as a mole to incriminate Dillard. Following Dillard's death, Shades is arrested due to his deal with the NYPD being revoked.
