= Power Man =

Power Man may refer to:

- Luke Cage, a Marvel Comics superhero, originally called Power Man
- Erik Josten, a Marvel supervillain later known as Smuggler, Goliath and Atlas
- Victor Alvarez, the current Power Man introduced in the mini-series Shadowland: Power Man
- Power Man and Iron Fist, a comic book series about Luke Cage's adventures with Danny Rand (Iron Fist)
- Veeram (2014 film), also released as Veeram: The Power Man, a 2014 Indian Tamil-language film by Siva

== See also ==
- Powerman (disambiguation)
