= Tilda Johnson =

Marvel Comics fictional character

Tilda Johnson Nightshade/Nighthawk
- First appearance of Tilda Johnson in Captain America and the Falcon #164 (August 1973)

Publication information
- Publisher: Marvel Comics
- First appearance: Captain America and the Falcon #164 (August 1973)
- Created by: Steve Englehart; Alan Lee Weiss

In-story information
- Alter ego: Tilda Johnson
- Species: Human
- Team affiliations: MODOK's 11; Femizons; Flashmob; Occupy Avengers
- Partnerships: Yellow Claw
- Notable aliases: Queen of the Werewolves, Deadly Nightshade, Doctor Nightshade, Nighthawk
- Abilities: Extraordinary genius; Wears protective battle armor, including silver spikes; Array of advanced weaponry and humanoid robots; Use of concentrated pheromones to control men through her allure and a chemical serum that turns humans into werewolves; Chemical pheromones in her body allows her to affect the will of certain animals, including werewolves

Tilda Johnson, introduced as the Queen of the Werewolves and also known as Dr. Nightshade, Deadly Nightshade, or simply Nightshade, is a fictional character appearing in American comic books published by Marvel Comics. Introduced as a supervillain opposing Captain America, Falcon, Power Man, Iron Fist, and Black Panther, she is later reformed, becoming the superhero Nighthawk and joining the Avengers in 2017.

Gabrielle Dennis portrayed Tilda Johnson in the second season of the Marvel Cinematic Universe (MCU) / Netflix series Luke Cage. Additionally, Nabiyah Be was intended to portray Johnson in the MCU film Black Panther, but was renamed Linda due to Dennis being announced to portray Johnson in Luke Cage.

== Publication history ==
Tilda Johnson first appeared in Captain America and the Falcon #164 (August 1973), created by Steve Englehart and Alan Lee Weiss.

== Fictional character biography ==
=== Queen of the Werewolves ===
Tilda Johnson was born to a poor family in New York City. As a child, she possessed a natural aptitude in science. When she was a teenager, she began to use this extensive knowledge in pursuing a career as a criminal scientist. She received assistance from the Yellow Claw in developing a way to change normal humans so that they became compliant creatures similar to werewolves, and attempted to transform convicts into a werewolf army, but Captain America and S.H.I.E.L.D. stopped their plan. She later took control of a S.H.I.E.L.D. facility, and used pheromones to force Captain America to battle the Falcon, but was defeated. She clashes with Power Man and Iron Fist on several occasions.

Superia later made Nightshade her second-in-command over the Femizons. She helps develop a serum to transform men into women which she uses on Captain America and Paladin. She also helped Superia develop her sterilization bomb. She was also involved in a scheme with Dredmund Druid, though as a double agent for Superia. She used a serum to transform Captain America and the ordinary people of Starkesboro, Massachusetts into pseudo-werewolves.

=== MODOK's 11 ===
Nightshade joined MODOK's 11, with the main objective of stealing the powerful Hypernova. It is revealed that after her last battle against the Black Panther, she tried to start her life over without crime. However, as she was self-taught and had no official degrees, the only medical job she could get was as a receptionist at a hospital. After she pointed out a mistake by one of the doctors, she was fired immediately and contemplated suicide, until MODOK contacted her and hired her for the heist. She had "used up all [her] second chances" and could not afford to turn MODOK down. She developed a friendship with her teammates Armadillo and Puma, and showed this strongly when backing up Puma in saving the Living Laser's life (and secretly giving him his Puma powers back through her "werewolf serum"). The three of them were the only villains to remain loyal to MODOK and get their cash (with a bonus); they appear to be sticking together, and she has offered to help Puma with his legal defense.

=== Shadowland ===
During the Shadowland storyline, Nightshade organized Flashmob, a group of former Luke Cage enemies, in order to take on the new Power Man, Victor Alvarez. Although Flashmob was defeated and incarcerated at Ryker's Island, Nightshade's lawyer Big Ben Donovan mentions that he has plans to have them released from Ryker's Island. Donovan was able to secure the release of some of the members, but others had to remain incarcerated due to the warrants or parole violations. During the Spider-Island storyline, Nightshade is among the villains who gain spider powers. She alongside Cottonmouth and Flashmob ended up fighting Heroes for Hire.

=== Reformation ===
A reformed Nightshade later allies with the Nighthawk of Earth-31916, helping him defend Chicago from a group of white nationalists called the True Patriots, and the Revelator. Sometime later, they help Hawkeye and Red Wolf after they find barrels of epidurium, a synthetic skin used to build Life Model Decoys, on a truck that was hijacked. They go to an abandoned coal factory where they end up being attacked by armed soldiers led by Nick Fury. It is later revealed, that Nick Fury, as well as Dum Dum Dugan, Gabe Jones and the other agents, are Life-Model Decoys due to their outdated knowledge and technology. They later thwart an attack by gunmen attempting to rob the base. After defeating the gunmen, Nightshade decides to join Hawkeye and Red Wolf, saying her goodbyes to Nighthawk.

Sometime later, the group stops at Dungston, Iowa when their van breaks down. Hawkeye calls Wheels Wolinski to help fix the van until it is revealed that some of the residents are Skrulls, who are being hunted down by mysterious men. While Hawkeye, Red Wolf, and Nightshade are fighting, Wolinski discovers that the van has an A.I. system, who convinces him to help in the fight. It is later revealed that the attackers are also Skrulls, led by Super-Skrull. Wolinski then manages to turn the van into a big robot and defeats Super-Skrull. Hawkeye then negotiates with Nick Fury Jr. to provide protection for the town's residents.

=== Becoming Nighthawk ===
During the Secret Empire storyline, while Hawkeye joins the Underground resistance following Hydra's takeover in the United States, the rest of the team gather their own resistance army to help the people in rural areas affected by Hydra's reign. Tilda also reveals that she became the new Nighthawk, after the former was killed by Hydra soldiers. After several successful victories, the resistance heads to a secret base in South Dakota and prepares for their next attack until Hydra forces raid the base. During the battle, Red Wolf and Tilda have a private conversation, in which both confess their feelings for each other, and they share a kiss. They then head out to help the resistance defeat Hydra.

== Powers and abilities ==
Tilda Johnson is extensively self-taught in genetics, biochemistry, cybernetics, robotics and physics. She also obtained a doctoral degree from an undisclosed university while in prison.

Nightshade sometimes wears protective battle armor, including silver spikes for protection from attack by werewolves. She has created an array of advanced weaponry, and has built numbers of humanoid robots. She created a chemical serum to transform normal humans into werewolves under her control and has used concentrated pheromones to control men through her allure.

Nightshade apparently secretes chemical pheromones from her body that affect the will of certain animals, including werewolves, making them obedient to her commands.

== In other media ==
Two characters inspired by Tilda Johnson appear in media set in the Marvel Cinematic Universe (MCU).

- Tilda Johnson appears in the second season of the MCU Netflix series Luke Cage, portrayed by Gabrielle Dennis. This version, also known by her real name Matilda Maybelline Dillard (nee Stokes), is the estranged daughter of a Stokes-born Mariah Dillard, who was raped by her great-Uncle Peter "Pistol Pete" Stokes and denied an abortion by her grandmother Maybelline "Mama Mabel" Stokes. While growing up in the care of Mariah's cousins, the Johnsons, Tilda initially believed her father was Mariah's late white husband Dr. Jackson Dillard, became close to her cousin Cottonmouth, and became a holistic doctor. In the present, Tilda reluctantly reconnects with Mariah due to the latter's efforts to improve her publicity, becomes involved with Bushmaster after one of his men forces her to help him, and learns the truth about her father, Mariah's crimes, and Cottonmouth's death. After Mariah massacres several innocents to lure out Bushmaster, Tilda disowns and later fatally poisons her, believing she will receive everything in her mother's will. However, she only receives Cottonmouth's keyboard as Mariah left his club, Harlem's Paradise, to Luke Cage.
- In June 2017, Nabiyah Be confirmed that she had been cast as Tilda Johnson in the MCU film Black Panther (2018), with plans for her to reprise the role in future films. After Dennis was announced to have been cast as Johnson in Luke Cage in July 2017, Be's character was renamed Linda Johnson in reshoots. Throughout the film, she assists her boyfriend Killmonger in his plans until he kills her to reach Ulysses Klaue.

== See also ==
- Nighthawk (Marvel Comics)
