= Chemistro =

Three characters have taken the moniker of the supervillain Chemistro appearing in American comic books published by Marvel Comics.

== Publication history ==
The Curtis Carr incarnation of Chemistro first appeared in Luke Cage, Hero for Hire #12 and was created by writer Steve Englehart and artist George Tuska.

The Archibald Morton incarnation of Chemistro first appeared in Power Man #37 and was created by writer Marv Wolfman and artist Ron Wilson.

The Calvin Carr incarnation of Chemistro first appeared in Power Man and Iron Fist #93 and was created by writer Kurt Busiek and artist Ernie Chan.

== Fictional character biography ==
=== Curtis Carr ===
Chemistro

Publication information
- Publisher: Marvel Comics
- First appearance: Luke Cage, Hero For Hire #12 (Aug. 1973)
- Created by: Steve Englehart (writer); George Tuska (artist)

In-story information
- Alter ego: Curtis Carr
- Species: Human mutate
- Team affiliations: Stark Industries
- Notable aliases: High-Tech
- Abilities: Gifted research scientist Highly skilled inventor Wields alchemy gun and a "nullifier" rifle Ability to transmute substances through contact with his left hand (As High-Tech): Wears armored exoskeleton suit Use of various devices

Curtis Carr was born in Kansas City, Kansas. While working as a chemist and research scientist for Mainstream Motors, he creates an "alchemy gun" capable of transmuting matter. Company president Horace Claymore is impressed with Curtis' creation until he states his intent to keep the device. Claymore argues that since the gun was made on company time, it belongs to Mainstream. After Claymore fires him, Curtis assumes the persona of Chemistro to gain revenge and to extort his former employers.

In combat with Luke Cage, Chemistro accidentally fires his alchemy gun at his right foot, turning it to steel and eventually disintegrating it due to the unstable nature of the transmutation. Curtis is turned over to the police; while in prison, his cellmate Archibald Morton forces him to reveal how the alchemy gun works. Morton becomes the second Chemistro, with Curtis helping Cage defeat him by creating a "nullifier" device.

Curtis's alchemy gun is later stolen by his younger brother Calvin, who becomes the third Chemistro. Curtis assists Cage and Iron Fist in defeating Calvin.

Curtis is employed at Stark Industries as a research scientist and developer of prosthetics, creating a prosthesis to replace his missing foot. During the "Acts of Vengeance" storyline, Curtis assists Iron Man and War Machine in battling the Wrecker when he attacks Stark Industries.

=== Archibald Morton ===
Chemistro II

Publication information
- Publisher: Marvel Comics
- First appearance: Power Man #37 (Nov. 1976)
- Created by: Marv Wolfman (writer); Ron Wilson (artist)

In-story information
- Alter ego: Archibald Morton
- Species: Human mutate
- Abilities: Ability to transmute substances through contact with his left hand

Archibald Morton is a professional criminal from Sheridan, Wyoming who was cellmates with Curtis Carr and forced him to reveal how his alchemy gun works. After leaving prison, Morton attempts to replicate the gun, but it explodes in his hand, giving him the ability to transmute substances via touch. He battles Luke Cage on behalf of the Baron. Morton is ultimately apprehended, thanks in large part to the help of the original Chemistro.

=== Calvin Carr ===
Chemistro III

Publication information
- Publisher: Marvel Comics
- First appearance: Power Man and Iron Fist #93 (June 1983)
- Created by: Kurt Busiek (writer); Ernie Chan (artist)

In-story information
- Alter ego: Calvin Carr
- Species: Human
- Team affiliations: Mandarin's Minions; Hood's Gang; Flashmob
- Abilities: Wields alchemy wrist-blasters

Curtis' younger brother Calvin Carr becomes the third Chemistro after stealing his alchemy gun. During the "Acts of Vengeance" storyline, the Wizard converts the gun into gauntlets and sends Chemistro and the Wrecker to attack Iron Man and Jim Rhodes. Calvin is subdued by Iron Man.

During the "Shadowland" storyline, Chemistro appears as a member of Flashmob. Chemistro is defeated by Power Man and incarcerated at Ryker's Island, but Big Ben Donovan arranges for him to be released.

Chemistro is among the villains recruited by Mandarin and Zeke Stane in a plot to take down Iron Man. Chemistro attempts to kill Tony Stark, but is killed by Jim Rhodes, who has assumed the mantle of Iron Man.

During the "Avengers: Standoff!" storyline, Chemistro appears alive as an inmate of Pleasant Hill, a gated community established by S.H.I.E.L.D.

== Powers and abilities ==
Curtis Carr is a gifted research scientist, with advanced degrees in chemistry, physics, and mechanical engineering. He is a highly skilled inventor and built his alchemy gun, which fires radiation able to transmute any substance into any other form of matter. He also built a "nullifier" rifle which is able to neutralize and reverse the effects of the alchemy gun, and Arch Morton's transmutation powers. The devices are cybernetically linked to the user, enabling him to work any transformation he can imagine. The transformed material usually turns to dust after exposure to heat or after a certain amount of time. Therefore, his alchemy gun cannot be used merely to transmute substances, such as turning lead or rock into gold. As High-Tech, Carr employed an armored exoskeleton suit and various devices of his own invention.

Archibald Morton was granted the ability to transmute substances by the touch of his left hand in a similar fashion after his experimental version of the alchemy gun exploded.

Calvin Carr used a set of wrist-blasters designed by the Wizard, which functioned in an identical manner to his brother's alchemy gun.

== Other versions ==
An alternate universe version of Calvin Carr / Chemistro from Earth-58163 appears in House of M: Masters of Evil as a member of the Hood's Masters of Evil.

== In other media ==
The Curtis Carr incarnation of Chemistro appears in The Avengers: Earth's Mightiest Heroes, voiced by Nolan North. This version is a member of the Masters of Evil before the Enchantress betrays him, steals his alchemy gun, and transforms him into gold. He is stated to be alive while being taken into custody, which writer Christopher Yost later confirmed.

== Reception ==
Chemistro has been noted as an underwhelming villain.
