= Gideon Mace =

- Gideon Mace as depicted in Captain America and the Mighty Avengers #3 (February 2015). Art by Iban Coello (penciller/inker) and Rachelle Rosenberg (colorist).

Publication information
- Publisher: Marvel Comics
- First appearance: Luke Cage, Hero for Hire #3 (1972)
- Created by: Archie Goodwin, George Tuska

In-story information
- Species: Human
- Team affiliations: United States Army; Maggia

Gideon Mace is a villain appearing in American comic books published by Marvel Comics.

== Fictional character biography ==
Gideon Mace is a colonel who led his men on an unauthorized assault against an enemy village, during which a mine destroyed his right hand. He was dishonorably discharged on the orders of General William Westmoreland for insubordination, mental incompetence, and suspicion of combat activity independent of orders. Mace replaced his lost hand with a spiked mace and formed a private army by recruiting ex-soldiers loyal to him.

Needing financing, Mace enlists enlisted disgruntled veterans, telling them that they will take control of Manhattan by seizing strategic points. Mace secretly intends the veterans to be decoys, diverting police away from Wall Street while his troops loot it. When one veteran, Owen Ridgely, learns of Mace's true goals, he seeks help from Luke Cage, but is murdered by Mace's men. Cage proceeds to locate and attack Mace's base. When Mace flees in a helicopter, Cage causes him to crash into the Hudson River.

Mace survives and establishes Security City, an isolated planned community where paranoid ultra-conservatives can live away from society. Mace trains the city's residents to follow him unconditionally and serve as his personal army. Luke Cage and his friend David Griffith arrive and expose Mace's plans.

Mace convinces several illicit organizations, such as the Maggia and Halwani Freedom Front, to fund him in targeting and murdering superheroes. He chooses White Tiger (Hector Ayala) as his first target, murdering most of Ayala's immediate family to lure him into his trap and shoot him. Mace's men dump Ayala outside the Daily Bugle, which Peter Parker witnesses. As Spider-Man, Peter overpowers Mace, who orders his guards to shoot regardless. Spider-Man avoids the shots, with Mace being hit instead and hospitalized.

Gideon Mace is killed by a mysterious creature, who tears out his heart. The creature begins growing a new body for Mace using his heart. However, Mace's body is destroyed once more, leaving only his heart intact.

== Powers and abilities ==
Gideon Mace is a trained soldier and a skilled strategist. He is an excellent shot with his left hand and an adept unarmed fighter. His right hand has been replaced by a foot-diameter titanium steel, spiked mace, which has also been adapted to spray chemical mace or to fire like a cannonball from his wrist.

== In other media ==
Gideon Mace appears in The Avengers: Earth's Mightiest Heroes "To Steal an Ant-Man" as a member of William Cross's gang.
