= Powerman =

Powerman may refer to:

- Powerman Duathlon, running and cycling competition
- Powerman Zofingen, Powerman Duathlon Championships in Switzerland
- Powerman 5000, an alternative rock band
- "Powerman", a song by The Kinks from Lola versus Powerman and the Moneygoround, Part One
- Powerman (comics), a British publication
- PowerMAN, PC power management software
- Matt Alaeddine, a contortionist with many stage names including Powerman
- Wheels on Meals, a 1984 Hong Kong film sometimes marketed under the title Powerman

== See also ==
- Power Man (disambiguation)
