= Diamondback (Willis Stryker) =

- Stryker/Diamondback in Heroes for Hire #1. Art by George Tuska.

Publication information
- Publisher: Marvel Comics
- First appearance: Luke Cage, Hero for Hire #1 (June 1972)
- Created by: Archie Goodwin; George Tuska

In-story information
- Alter ego: Willis Harold Stryker
- Team affiliations: Hydra; Maggia
- Notable aliases: Diamondback; Stryker; Mr. Sky
- Abilities: Expert hand-to-hand combatant and knife fighter Superhuman strength and speed Use of conventional and trick knives

Diamondback (Willis Harold Stryker) is a fictional character appearing in American comic books published by Marvel Comics. He is primarily an enemy of Luke Cage and was the first major supervillain he faced.

The character was portrayed by Erik LaRay Harvey in the first season of the Marvel Cinematic Universe television series Luke Cage.

== Publication history ==
Willis Stryker was created by Archie Goodwin and George Tuska and first appeared in Luke Cage, Hero for Hire #1 (June 1972).

Stryker was apparently killed off in Luke Cage, Hero for Hire #2, shortly after his debut. After 45 years, Stryker returned in All-New Guardians of the Galaxy: Free Comic Book Day (July 2017).

== Fictional character biography ==
Willis Stryker was born and raised in Harlem, New York City. He grew up on the street alongside Carl Lucas, his best friend and future partner. Stryker and Lucas joined a local gang called the Rivals alongside Shades and Comanche. Lucas eventually found an honest job, while Stryker became a gangster.

A girl named Reva Connors loved both Lucas and Stryker, but was more attracted to Lucas. Stryker, devastated by jealousy, frames Lucas by hiding drugs in his home, causing Lucas to be sent to prison. The drugs belonged to the Maggia so they hunted Willis but ended up killing Reva.

Lucas changes his name to Luke Cage and escapes from prison. Cage is attacked by hitmen hired by Diamondback. When the attack fails, Diamondback has his inventor Gadget-Man create new gimmicked switch blades to deal with Cage and kidnaps Claire Temple. Tracking Diamondback to his lair, Cage is surprised to learn that he is Stryker. During the fight, Diamondback falls through a skylight and is blown up by one of his switchblades.

Long after his apparent death, Diamondback is revealed to have survived. He plans to become a crime lord, starting in Harlem and moving to the eastern seaboard. Diamondback meets with several other crime lords at Club Ultimate, which is crashed by Luke Cage, Iron Fist, and Daredevil. During a stakeout of Club Ultimate, Iron Fist and Jessica Jones are ambushed by Diamondback, who breaks Iron Fist's back. While gloating over Iron Fist, Diamondback is caught off guard when Jones attacks him. After being defeated by Jones and Iron Fist, Diamondback is arrested by the police and transferred to a prison, as he was deemed too dangerous to be placed in the county lockup. He is transported along with the Punisher, who had been captured by Daredevil and Cage. During the ride, Diamondback taunts the Punisher, causing the truck to crash and enabling them to escape.

During the "Gang War" storyline, Diamondback attends a crime lord meeting at Arthur Avenue. He states that he has his own plans for Madame Masque's territory and that he is backed by Hydra. As Diamondback visits a secret Hydra facility, he is contacted by Viper, who states that Hydra knows of the upcoming gang war and intends to back him. As Diamondback speaks to several thugs at a nightclub in the Financial District, he is attacked by Spider-Woman, who tries to get answers on why Hydra is backing him. Diamondback and Green Mamba manage to subdue Spider-Woman before escaping. Spider-Woman confronts Diamondback and learns that Green Mamba is her son Gerry, who was kidnapped by Hydra and aged into an adult to serve them.

== Powers and abilities ==
Willis Stryker is an expert knife fighter and hand-to-hand combatant. Outside of conventional knives, Willis Stryker uses trick knives that were modified by Gadget. They can emit gas, contain sonic disruptors, and cause explosions.

Following his return from the dead, Diamondback appeared to possess some degree of superhuman strength, being able to throw a person across a room, catch a punch from Jessica Jones and lift her up with one hand, as well as having some degree of superhuman speed. It's later revealed that his super-strength and speed come from consuming drugs.

== Other versions ==
=== House of M ===
An alternate universe version of Willis Stryker / Diamondback from Earth-58163 makes a minor appearance in House of M: Avengers #1. This version is a mutant with reptilian features.

=== Marvel Noir ===
An alternate universe version of Willis Stryker from Earth-90214 appears in Luke Cage Noir. This version is a Harlem crime boss.

== In other media ==
Willis Stryker / Diamondback appears in Luke Cage, portrayed by Erik LaRay Harvey as an adult and by Jared Kemp as a teenager. This version is the older half-brother and former best friend of Luke Cage who was born from an affair that Cage's father Reverend James Lucas had with his secretary Dana Stryker. As youths, Willis and Cage were arrested for grand theft auto, resulting in the latter joining the Marines while the former served in juvenile detention, later jail, where he was forced to kill in self-defense. This, coupled with Dana being abandoned by Lucas and dying from cancer led to Willis swearing revenge on Cage, who he successfully framed and sent to Seagate Prison. Willis goes on to become an arms dealer, trafficking weapons to Harlem crime boss Cornell Stokes and his cousin Mariah Dillard.
