= David Griffith (comics) =

Fictional comics character

Publication information
- Publisher: Marvel Comics
- First appearance: Hero for Hire #2 (Aug. 1972)
- Created by: Archie Goodwin and George Tuska

In-story information
- Notable aliases: D.W. Griffith

David "D.W." Griffith is a fictional character appearing in American comic books published by Marvel Comics. He is depicted as an ally of Luke Cage.

The character was portrayed by Jeremiah Richard Craft in the television series Luke Cage set in the Marvel Cinematic Universe.

== Publication history ==
The character, created by Archie Goodwin and George Tuska, first appeared in Hero for Hire #2 (Aug. 1972).

== Fictional character biography ==
David Griffith is the owner of the Gem Theater, where he rents out a room for Luke Cage when he needed a place to stay. Despite the theater being a constant source of destruction, Griffith remains faithful to Cage, mostly because he considered him his only friend. Griffith is also a film student and wishes to establish his own production company. When it seemed that he was going nowhere, Griffith attempts to commit suicide, but a mysterious stranger, implied to be Moon Knight, convinces him not to.

== In other media ==
Dave Griffith appears in Luke Cage, portrayed by Jeremiah Richard Craft. This version is black and works as Luke Cage's informant at his insistence. In the second season, Griffith establishes a Luke Cage merchandise store within Pop's Barber Shop, which he later acquires ownership of.
