= Power Man and Iron Fist =

American comic book series published by Marvel Comics

- Power Man and Iron Fist, 50th issue cover

Publication information
- Publisher: Marvel Comics
- Format: Ongoing series
- Genre: Superhero
- Publication date: 1972–1986
- Main character(s): Power Man and Iron Fist

Power Man and Iron Fist (originally Luke Cage, Hero for Hire then Luke Cage, Power Man) was an American comic book series published by Marvel Comics, featuring the superheroes Power Man and Iron Fist.

== Publication history ==
=== Hero for Hire/Power Man ===
The series debuted as Hero for Hire #1, and became Power Man from #17 onwards. The cover logo included Luke Cage's name, so from #1–16 the cover logo read Luke Cage, Hero for Hire and from #17 onwards Luke Cage, Power Man. The series was initially written by Luke Cage's co-creator Archie Goodwin, pencilled by George Tuska, and inked by Billy Graham.

=== Power Man and Iron Fist ===
When Power Man's sales became unsustainable, Marvel added Iron Fist, another once popular superhero who could no longer support his own series, to save both characters from full cancellation. Iron Fist joined the cast of Power Man in a three-part story arc in #48–50. The series title changed to Power Man and Iron Fist with #50, though the indicia did not reflect this change until #67.

Iron Fist writer Chris Claremont penned the initial stories pairing the characters, but was soon forced to turn the series over to Jo Duffy due to his unmanageable workload. Duffy's run was noted for its lighthearted, humorous, character-driven tone, and had relatively few fight scenes. A young Kurt Busiek had his first regular assignment with the title, writing it from issue #90 to #100. He emulated the lighthearted humor of Duffy's run, not knowing that Duffy had been taken off Power Man and Iron Fist precisely because the editorial staff disapproved of her lighthearted tongue-in-cheek approach to the series.

Goodwin then returned to the series, but had difficulty keeping up with the work, and his brief second run was littered with issues by fill-in writers, including two by Busiek. Jim Owsley, another Marvel staffer, took over as regular writer. The series concluded with the death of Iron Fist in #125, a controversial story. Owsley later commented, "Fist's death was senseless and shocking and completely unforeseen. It took the readers' heads clean off. And, to this day, people are mad about it. Forgetting, it seems, that (a) you were supposed to be mad, that death is senseless and Fist's death was supposed to be senseless, or that (b) this is a comic book."

=== Power Man and Iron Fist revivals ===
Power Man and Iron Fist returned as a five-issue limited series in 2011, spinning-off from the "Shadowland" storyline, which introduced a new Power Man, Victor Alvarez. It was written by one of the character's creators Fred Van Lente, with art by Wellinton Alves. It returned again in 2016, with Luke Cage replacing Alvarez.

== Creators ==
=== Writers ===
- Chris Claremont - Power Man/Iron Fist #50-53 (April 1978 - October 1978), #76 (December 1981)
- Ed Hannigan - Power Man/Iron Fist #53-55 (October 1978 - February 1979)
- Mary Jo Duffy - Power Man/Iron Fist #56–75, 77–84 (April 1979 – November 1981, January 1982–August 1982)
- Bob Layton - Power Man/Iron Fist #67 (February 1981)
- Steven Grant - Power Man/Iron Fist #69, 91, 101 (May 1981, March 1983, January 1984)
- Mike W. Barr - Power Man/Iron Fist #76 (December 1981)
- Dennis O'Neil - Power Man/Iron Fist #85–89 (September 1982–January 1983)
- Kurt Busiek - Power Man/Iron Fist #90, 92–100, 102, 105 (February 1983, April 1983–December 1983, May 1984)
- Archie Goodwin - Power Man/Iron Fist #103–104, 108 (February 1984–April 1984, August 1984)
- Alan Rowlands - Power Man/Iron Fist #106–107, 109 (June 1984–July 1984, September 1984)
- Jim Owsley - Power Man/Iron Fist #108, 111–125 (August 1984, November 1984–September 1986)
- Tony Isabella - Power Man/Iron Fist #110 (October 1984)

=== Artists ===
- Kerry Gammill - Power Man #67-68, 70–72, 74–75, 77–79, 84 (February 1981–April 1981, June 1981–August 1981, October 1981–November 1981, January 1982–March 1982, August 1982)
- Alan Weiss - Power Man/Iron Fist #69 (May 1981)
- Greg LaRocque - Power Man/Iron Fist #73, 91, 102–104, 106, 108–113 (September 1981, March 1983, February 1984–April 1984, August 1984–January 1985)
- Frank Miller - Power Man/Iron Fist #76 (December 1981)
- Rudy Nebres - Power Man/Iron Fist #76 (December 1981)
- Denys Cowan - Power Man/Iron Fist #80–83, 86–90, 92–93 (April 1982–July 1982, October 1982–February 1983, April 1983–May 1983)
- Keith Pollard - Power Man/Iron Fist #85 (September 1982)
- Ernie Chan - Power Man/Iron Fist #94–100 (June 1983–December 1983)
- Geof Isherwood - Power Man/Iron Fist #101, 107 (January 1984, July 1984)
- Richard Howell - Power Man/Iron Fist #105 (May 1984)
- Steve Geiger - Power Man/Iron Fist #114 (February 1985)
- Billy Graham - Power Man/Iron Fist #114 (February 1985)
- Mark Bright - Power Man/Iron Fist #115–125 (March 1985–September 1986)

== Collected editions ==
Title	Material collected	Published date	ISBN
Essential Power Man and Iron Fist Vol. 1	Power Man and Iron Fist #50-72, 74-75	January 2008	978-0785127260
Essential Power Man and Iron Fist Vol. 2	Power Man and Iron Fist #76-100	March 2009	978-0785130727
Power Man & Iron Fist Epic Collection: Heroes for Hire	Power Man #48-49, Power Man and Iron Fist #50-70	August 2015	978-1302929879
Power Man & Iron Fist Epic Collection: Revenge!	Power Man and Iron Fist #71-72, 74-89, Daredevil #178	October 2016	978-1302900137
Power Man & Iron Fist Epic Collection: Doombringer	Power Man and Iron Fist #90-107	December 2019	978-1302920715
Power Man & Iron Fist Epic Collection: Hardball	Power Man and Iron Fist #108-125	August 2022	978-1302945923
Power Man & Iron Fist: The Comedy of Death	Power Man and Iron Fist (vol. 2) #1-5	November 2011	978-0785152477
Power Man and Iron Fist Vol. 1: The Boys are Back in Town	Power Man and Iron Fist (vol. 3) #1-5	October 2016	978-1302901141
Power Man and Iron Fist Vol. 2: Civil War II	Power Man and Iron Fist (vol. 3) #6-9, Sweet Christmas Annual #1	March 2017	978-1302901158
Power Man and Iron Fist Vol. 3: Street Magic	Power Man and Iron Fist (vol. 3) #10-15	October 2017	978-1302905392
