= Power Man (Victor Alvarez) =

Victor Alvarez
- Victor Alvarez / Power Man as part of the unofficial team "The Chosen."; Cover of Fear Itself: The Home Front #6. Art by Marko Djurdjević.

Publication information
- Publisher: Marvel Comics
- First appearance: Shadowland: Power Man #1 (October 2010)
- Created by: Fred Van Lente; Mahmud Asrar

In-story information
- Alter ego: Victor Alvarez
- Species: Human mutate
- Team affiliations: Avengers Idea Mechanics; Avengers Academy; Mighty Avengers; Heroes for Hire; Thunderbolts; Champions
- Partnerships: Iron Fist; Pinpoint
- Notable aliases: Power Man
- Abilities: Chi manipulation granting: Superhuman strength, speed, durability, and agility; Power augmentation; Energy, memory and attribute absorption; Energy projection; Size manipulation; Skilled martial artist

Power Man (Victor Alvarez) is a superhero appearing in American comic books published by Marvel Comics. Created by Fred Van Lente and Mahmud Asrar, the character first appeared in Shadowland: Power Man #1 (October 2010). Victor Alvarez is the third incarnation of Power Man. He is the son of the supervillain Shades.

== Publication history ==
=== 2010's ===
Victor Alvarez debuted as part of the "Shadowland" crossover in Shadowland: Power Man #1, created by writer Fred Van Lente and artist Mahmud Asrar. He appeared in the 2010 Avengers Academy series. He appeared in the 2011 Power Man and Iron Fist series. He appeared in the 2011 Fear Itself: The Home Front anthology series. He appeared as part of the Marvel NOW! initiative in the 2013 Mighty Avengers series.

=== 2020's ===
Victor Alvarez appeared in the 2022 Thunderbolts series, by writer Jim Zub and artist Sean Izaakse.

== Fictional character biography ==
Victor Alvarez was first introduced as a teenager from the neighborhood of Hell's Kitchen in New York City. He is the son of Reina Alvarez and Shades. As a child, he was caught in an explosion caused by the villain Bullseye that killed over 100 people, including Shades. Victor survived using a technique that drew the chi from the dead bodies around him and temporarily granted him superhuman strength and fortitude.

Some time later during the Shadowland storyline, Victor took on the name Power Man and began using his abilities to fight crime as a hero for hire, advertising his services on sites like Craigslist. Victor's activities eventually drew the attention of Luke Cage, a member of the Avengers who had once used the Power Man name. Cage and his partner Iron Fist eventually learn that Victor is the son of Shades, who Cage had fought years earlier. Though Victor dislikes both Cage and Iron Fist, he eventually teams up with them to help the other heroes fight the crazed Matt Murdock and his army of Hand ninjas.

During the Fear Itself storyline, Power Man ends up teleported onto a station in the middle of the Pacific Ocean with Amadeus Cho, Spider-Girl, Thunderstrike and X-23. They end up fighting a group of samurai Shark Men. Power Man is part of the new class of students when the Avengers Academy moves to the former headquarters of the West Coast Avengers.

During the Infinity storyline, Power Man was with Heroes for Hire while they stopped Plunderer's men from stealing robot parts. After Superior Spider-Man stops Plunderer, he called Heroes for Hire mercenaries in front of Power Man. While at a café with Luke Cage, Power Man expresses a desire to attack Spider-Man, Luke is more concerned with the consequences for his family. Power Man then plans to start his own version of the Avengers, which inspires him and the Heroes for Hire into reforming themselves as the Mighty Avengers.

In the All-New, All-Different Marvel event, Power Man joins Sunspot's incarnation of the New Avengers. After many missions with the New Avengers, Power Man realizes he neglected his hometown for too long and leave the team to return to New York.

After the "Devil's Reign" storyline, Power Man is recruited into Luke Cage's Thunderbolts led by Hawkeye. Experiencing an identity crisis, Power Man begins soul searching. After a talk with Bruce Banner, he decides to retire the Power Man name and forge a new path for himself.

== Powers and abilities ==
Victor Alvarez acquired a range of superpowers after a traumatic explosion during his childhood. He possesses the ability to draw chi energy from his environment. His skin color changes to a glowing red when Victor Alvarez uses this power. It grants him superhuman strength, speed, durability, and agility. This technique is similar to the one that gives Iron Fist his abilities, something the hero commented on during his first encounter with Victor Alvarez. He is able to enhance the superpowers of others. He has the ability to change his size. Victor Alvarez can also absorb energy. Additionally, he is a skilled martial artist.

Victor Alvarez wears a yellow and black body suit with metal embellishments, similar to the look of Luke Cage, the first Power Man.

== Reception ==
=== Critical response ===
Tom Moore of Looper included Victor Alvarez in their "Young Marvel Heroes Who Still Need To Appear In The MCU" list. Screen Rant included Victor Alvarez in their "10 Best Street-Level Heroes Not Yet In The MCU" list, and in their "10 Iconic New York City-Based Marvel Superheroes We Haven't Seen In The MCU" list. Comic Book Resources ranked Victor Alvarez 5th in their "10 Iconic Marvel Characters Who Debuted In Comic Events" list.
