= Big Ben Donovan =

Publication information
- Publisher: Marvel Comics
- First appearance: Luke Cage, Hero for Hire #14 (October 1973)
- Created by: Steve Englehart; Billy Graham

In-story information
- Full name: Benjamin Donovan
- Species: Human
- Abilities: Super-strength

Benjamin "Big Ben" Donovan is a fictional character appearing in American comic books published by Marvel Comics. Depending on his appearance in the comics, Big Ben Donovan is either a criminal lawyer who has appeared in the comics that starred Daredevil and Luke Cage, or a gang leader.

Donovan was portrayed by Danny Johnson in the Marvel Television series Daredevil and Luke Cage (both 2016-2018), set in the Marvel Cinematic Universe (MCU). Leilani Barrett voices the character in the MCU animated series Your Friendly Neighborhood Spider-Man (2025).

== Publication history ==
Big Ben Donovan first appeared in Luke Cage, Hero for Hire #14 and was created by Steve Engelhart and Billy Graham.

== Fictional character biography ==
Big Ben Donovan is a lawyer who is hired by Mrs. Jenks to settle the last of Mr. Jenks' affairs. When Mrs. Jenks attempts to give Donovan the payoff, he drunkenly goes after Mrs. Jenks, who runs to the office of Luke Cage. This leads to a fight between Cage and Donovan, which ends with the misunderstanding being cleared and Donovan surrendering. Donovan proceeds to work as Cage's lawyer until he started working with Jeri Hogarth.

Big Ben Donovan had a brother named Paul, who became the leader of the Thunderbolts gang. After his brother is killed by operatives of the Maggia, Donovan's sanity breaks. He vows vengeance on those responsible and hijacks a Maggia shipment under the supervision of Caesar Cicero. When Donovan turns to Luke Cage for help, they defeat Cicero's men before being defeated by Man Mountain Marko, who brings them to Cicero. Before Cicero's men can bury Cage alive, Iron Fist and Thunderbolt arrive to help Cage and Donovan.

It was revealed that Big Ben Donovan has a son named Little Ben Donovan who Big Ben Donovan left as a kid. Donovan managed to put money into his son's trust fund so that he could go to Columbia University after high school. During that time, Eric Slaughter took over the criminal organization at the docks, where he had his minion Floyd kill a dock worker. Agent Purcell of a rogue task force finds Big Ben Donovan in his prison and forces him to take the rap for the dock worker's murder.

Five days before he is set to be executed, Donovan is visited by Dakota North, who records his confession and his conversion to Islam. He later got a visit from Matt Murdock, who intends to be his lawyer. Murdock expresses interest in clearing Donovan of his charges, but Donovan believes himself to be guilty. Murdock later tells Donovan that Floyd confessed to his crimes.

== Powers and abilities ==
Big Ben Donovan has super-strength.

=== Equipment ===
Donovan once utilized large platform shoes with tips and heels made of steel, which enable him to perform powerful kicking attacks.

== In other media ==
- Big Ben Donovan appears in The Avengers: Earth's Mightiest Heroes episode "To Steal an Ant-Man" as a member of William Cross' gang.
- Benjamin "Big Ben" Donovan appears in Marvel's Netflix television series set in the Marvel Cinematic Universe, portrayed by Danny Johnson as an adult and Chaundre Hall-Broomfield as a child. This version is a crooked defense attorney at the law firm Donovan and Partners who represents high-profile criminals and corrupt politicians in New York City's criminal underworld.
  - First appearing in the second season of Daredevil, Donovan represents Wilson Fisk as his attorney, consigliere, and financial advisor. In the third season, Donovan successfully arranges for Fisk's release from prison by brokering a deal with the FBI to have the latter serve as an informant in exchange for Vanessa Marianna's safety.
  - Donovan also appears in Luke Cage, managing Mariah Dillard's affairs and representing Cornell Stokes in court until Cottonmouth is killed by Dillard. Additionally, it is revealed that Donovan has been the Stokes family's lawyer for over 25 years, with his law school tuition being paid for by Dillard and Cottonmouth's grandmother, Maybelline Stokes.
- An alternate timeline version of Big Ben Donovan named Big Donovan appears in Your Friendly Neighborhood Spider-Man, voiced by Leilani Barrett. This version is initially the leader of the 110th Street Gang before leaving them after he is nearly killed by the Scorpion.
