= Shadowland (comics) =

2010 Marvel Comics limited series featuring Daredevil

- Cover of the 1st issue
- Publisher: Marvel Comics
- Publication date: September – December 2010
- Genre: Superhero
- Main character(s): The Beast (Demon); Black Tarantula; Bullseye; Luke Cage; Daredevil; Elektra; Ghost Rider; The Hand; Iron Fist; J. Jonah Jameson; Kingpin; Lady Bullseye; Master Izo; Misty Knight; Mister Negative; Moon Knight; Paladin; Power Man (Victor Alvarez); The Profile; Punisher; Shadow Knight; Shang-Chi; The Shroud; Silver Sable; Spider-Man; Thunderbolts; Typhoid Mary; White Tiger; Colleen Wing; Wolverine

Creative team
- Writer: Andy Diggle
- Penciller: Billy Tan
- Inker: Matt Banning
- Letterer: Joe Caramagna
- Colorist(s): Guru eFX; Christina Strain
- Editor(s): Thomas Brennan; Stephen Wacker
- Shadowland HC: ISBN 0-7851-4762-4

"Shadowland" is a 2010 comic book storyline published by Marvel Comics, focusing on Daredevil and other "street-level" superheroes in the Marvel Universe. The storyline started in the Daredevil comic and was expanded upon in the Shadowland five-issue mini series as well as four tie-in mini series, four one-shots, and two issues of Thunderbolts. The storyline was collected into seven individual hard cover and soft cover trade paperbacks in 2011.

The story chronicles Daredevil's return to Hell's Kitchen after he becomes the leader of the Hand Ninja clan. He builds a temple/prison in Hell's Kitchen, the eponymous Shadowland. His methods get more extreme as he kills long-time adversary Bullseye. The change in attitude brings him and his ally White Tiger in conflict with a number of street level super-heroes such as Spider-Man, Luke Cage, Iron Fist, Moon Knight and more. The storyline also introduces a new Power Man to the Marvel Universe.

The heroes later realize that Daredevil has become possessed by the Beast of the Hand, which explains why Daredevil's actions have become more and more extreme and erratic. The heroes are helped out by the Kingpin and Lady Bullseye as they try to preserve the Kingpin's criminal empire. In the final moments of the story Iron Fist uses his mystical chi to heal Daredevil, releasing the demon inside him. In an act of sacrifice Daredevil kills himself before the Beast can take control of him again, breaking the spell the Beast had on Hell's Kitchen. Afterwards his corpse disappears, apparently to be revived by Elektra at the conclusion of the event.

== Publication history ==
The storyline included a number of tie-in limited series and one shots. As well as the core Shadowland title from writer Andy Diggle, the limited series include Blood on the Streets by Antony Johnston, Power Man by Fred Van Lente, Moon Knight by Gregg Hurwitz and Daughters of the Shadow by Jason Henderson. The one-shots focus on Spider-Man from Dan Slott, Elektra by Zeb Wells, Bullseye from John Layman and Ghost Rider from Rob Williams. The storyline also crossed over into the Thunderbolts series.

== Plot ==
Matt Murdock returns to Hell's Kitchen from Japan as a changed man and seeks to utilise the Hand as a force for justice, including constructing Shadowland, a prison/temple constructed on the ruins of a Hell's Kitchen building which was destroyed (along with numerous lives) by Bullseye during the Dark Reign event. He confronts and battles Bullseye, who had escaped from the Raft, and kills him the same way that Bullseye had killed Elektra several years prior. The street-level heroes Spider-Man, Luke Cage, Iron Fist, Moon Knight, and even the Punisher begin to question Matt and his methods.

Following his fight with Bullseye, Daredevil is joined by White Tiger.

The Hell Bikers later hold a funeral for Bullseye, which is unauthorized by Mayor J. Jonah Jameson, with Ben Urich and Danny Deaver dragged along to attend. Deaver however keeps getting visions of Bullseye. It is not clear to him whether or not it is the real ghost or just part of Deaver's psychosis. The funeral service is interrupted by Daredevil and the Hand, as a massive brawl breaks out, almost killing Urich.

Iron Fist and Luke Cage have an encounter with Power Man (Victor Alvarez), a survivor of the building that Bullseye blew up.

Silver Sable, Misty Knight, Paladin, and Shroud later work together when Daredevil's Hand Ninjas begin secretly targeting members of the mafia.

Daredevil hires Profile to take down Moon Knight. Profile convinces Randall Spector, Moon Knight's deranged brother, that he is actually the second avatar of Khonshu, Shadow Knight. Moon Knight then travels to New Orleans for the Sapphire Crescent, which can be used to kill the demon possessing Daredevil, but instead must use it to kill his brother before he blows up innocent hostages.

Master Izo tries to convince Elektra to help stop the Hand from corrupting Matt. Initially, she refuses, but reconsiders after she witnessed the broadcast of Daredevil killing Bullseye.

The day after Bullseye's murder, Iron Fist and Luke Cage are discussing Murdock's actions when they are visited by the Kingpin, who warns them that they will soon need to take Murdock down. Black Tarantula later speaks with Daredevil, who is planning on recruiting any costumed superhero into his version of the Hand. He also states that anyone who denies his invitation is against the Hand. Later that day, the Kingpin and Lady Bullseye hold a ritual to bring back a warrior who is feared by the Hand. At the same time, the heroes, led by Luke Cage, enter Shadowland and talk with Murdock. They are interrupted by the Hand ninjas, who warn the heroes that the dungeon is being attacked by Kingpin's warrior Ghost Rider. Daredevil accuses the heroes of being there as a distraction while they are invaded, but Luke Cage denies it. Angry, Daredevil orders the Hand to attack the heroes and capture them dead or alive.

During Ghost Rider's attack on Shadowland, he has an encounter with the Snakeroot Clan who are allied with the Hand.

After a difficult battle, the heroes manage to escape when the Punisher arrives and provides cover fire. When the other street heroes find Ghost Rider, he explains that he is somehow being forced to do this. Moon Knight decides to stay even when the prisoners escape, and the heroes even with Punisher's help are forced to run away. However, in the battle, they realized that simply was not Matt. The heroes are then visited by Master Izo who reveals that Daredevil is about to resurrect Bullseye and transform him into something else. At the same time, Daredevil meets with fellow Hand members Elektra, Typhoid Mary, White Tiger, and Black Tarantula at Bullseye's grave.

Black Tarantula is informed by White Tiger to execute the looters, but he becomes confused and sees that something is wrong with Daredevil. However, White Tiger is possessed by the Hand and stabs Black Tarantula in his back with the blade, and she tosses him over the edge to fall into the vehicle, leaving him for dead.

Days after the fight, Colleen Wing is contacted by Daredevil offering information about her mother. Upon visiting him again, he reveals to her that her mother actually led a resurrected Hand group of all women swordsmen called "the Nail". Colleen's mother and the Nail were eventually assassinated by one of The Hand's enemies. Daredevil then asks her to lead a new incarnation of the group. She eventually accepts and meets the Nail consisting of Black Lotus, Cherry Blossom, Makro, and Yuki. Colleen Wing defends herself from the other Daughters of the Dragon when she ends up betrayed.

Luke Cage is visited by his old friend Lacy Kimbro who tells him that her son Darris is among the cops that are held captive by the Underhand (a group of ninjas that are already dead). The Thunderbolts are soon summoned for mission from the Raft to the mainland. They meet with Cage by some railway tracks. He informs them that their mission is to locate Darris and bring down the Hand's stronghold, assigning Fixer to lead the team, while he goes to try to convince Daredevil to stop. As they descend into the tunnels, the Thunderbolts notice how paranoid Ghost has become and how he does not want to be referred to by his former identity. They are ambushed by the Hand ninjas, but the Thunderbolts fight them. A group of Underhand Ninjas merge and knock Juggernaut down. Fixer is stabbed while Songbird is taken down, giving Moonstone the opportunity to do things her way.

Mister Negative decides to take the advantage of the conflict against the Hand and plan to start a criminal establishment near Shadowland. He and his Inner Demons end up running afoul of Spider-Man and Shang-Chi.

Realizing that Matt is possessed by the demonic Beast of the Hand, the heroes gather together to try to fight him themselves. Meanwhile, Kingpin and Lady Bullseye view the carnage that is occurring in the city. Lady Bullseye informs Kingpin that he may lose New York. Master Izo states that there might be one way to free Daredevil from the Beast of the Hand. Despite their efforts to interrupt Bullseye's resurrection ceremony, even a stun grenade thrown by the Punisher and a direct attack from Wolverine fails to kill the now-demonic Daredevil. Daredevil ends up dodging Punisher's bullets as Spider-Man webs up Typhoid Mary. Spider-Man webs down Daredevil and Elektra attempts to reason with him. The voice that comes out of Daredevil proclaims, "There is no Murdock! There is only the Beast!".

Foggy Nelson arrives at the gates of the fortress and tries to reach Matt verbally, but is ignored and cannot get inside. He decides that Matt has saved him so many times, that now it is his turn to save Matt. Foggy scales the walls to reach him where he is intercepted by the White Tiger. She leads him to Daredevil who sits among the defeated heroes. Matt decides to kill Foggy himself, and Foggy finds himself unable to kill Matt. Iron Fist takes advantage of this moment of weakness to strike Daredevil and heal him with chi. Daredevil had transformed physically to take on a more demonic shape. Daredevil, who has gained a moment of freedom from the monster controlling him, briefly reflects upon his past before taking his own life, to stop his internal demon. Hence, residents of Hell's Kitchen are freed from the spell that turned them against each other. However, the heroes who had fought against Daredevil notice his corpse is gone, and Elektra is seen, hidden, holding a piece of his costume. Iron Fist goes to assist Power Man, who has just defeated a demon conjured by the Hand and freed his sister. Iron Fist offers to train Power Man, and the latter accepts his offer on the condition that his mother is taken care of. Rand begins to train Victor in Kung Fu and mastering his chi, while Victor's mother is tricked into believing that he works for a community outreach program. The Kingpin reveals that Typhoid Mary has a secret fourth personality loyal to him, which he awakens with keywords before beginning his attempt to take over the Hand. An unidentified man appears at a Catholic church asking for confession, claiming that he is lost.

A masked man appearing to be Daredevil violently confronts a group of masked people. Upon closer inspection, Luke Cage and Iron Fist realize the assailant to be Black Panther, who, when questioned, claims that Hell's Kitchen is his turf now, "Spread the word." He also claims to be "not who you think [he is]." Black Tarantula is revealed as being alive, having been cared for by the Night Nurse, following his confrontation with White Tiger. Matt Murdock gets off a bus on a road just outside a rural town, thinking himself responsible for the murders of Shadowland and embarking on a "lonely road paved with good intentions".

== Titles ==
The titles of the related series include:

- Daredevil #508–512 (by writers Andy Diggle and Antony Johnston and artists Roberto De la Torre and Marco Checchetto)
- Shadowland #1–5 (by writer Andy Diggle and artist Billy Tan, 5-issue limited series)
- Shadowland: Blood on the Streets #1–4 (by writer Antony Johnston and artist Wellington Alves, 4-issue mini-series)
- Shadowland: Power Man #1–4 (by writer Fred Van Lente and artist Mahmud Asrar, 4-issue mini-series)
- Shadowland: Moon Knight #1–3 (by writer Gregg Hurwitz and artist Bong Dazo, 3-issue mini-series)
- Shadowland: Daughters of the Shadow #1–3 (by writer Jason Henderson and artist Ivan Rodriguez, 3-issue mini-series)
- Shadowland: Spider-Man #1 (by writer Dan Slott and artist Paulo Siqueira, one-shot)
- Shadowland: Elektra #1 (by writer Zeb Wells and artist Emma Rios, one-shot)
- Shadowland: Bullseye #1 (by writer John Layman and artist Sean Chen, one-shot)
- Shadowland: Ghost Rider #1 (by writer Rob Williams and artist Clayton Crain, one-shot)
- Thunderbolts #148–149 (by writer Jeff Parker and artist Declan Shalvey)
- Shadowland: After the Fall #1 (by writer Antony Johnston and artists Marco Checchetto and Roberto de la Torre, one-shot)

== Collected editions ==
Title	Material collected	Published date	ISBN
Shadowland	Shadowland #1-5	February 2011	0-7851-4762-4
Shadowland: Daredevil	Daredevil #508–512, Shadowland: After the Fall	February 2011	0-785143998
Shadowland: Blood on the Streets	Shadowland: Blood on the Streets #1-4	March 2011	0-7851-4399-8
Shadowland: Moon Knight	Shadowland: Moon Knight #1–3, Moon Knight (vol. 1) #13	March 2011	0-7851-4889-2
Shadowland: Street Heroes	Shadowland: Daughters of the Shadow #1-3 and Shadowland: Bullseye, Elektra, Ghost Rider, Spider-Man	March 2011	0-7851-4889-2
Shadowland: Power Man	Shadowland: Power Man #1–4	April 2011	0-7851-4397-1
Shadowland: Thunderbolts	Thunderbolts #148–151	April 2011	0-7851-5218-0
Daredevil: Shadowland Omnibus	Daredevil #501–512, Shadowland #1-5, Shadowland: Blood on the Streets #1-4, Shadowland: Power Man #1–4, Shadowland: Moon Knight #1–3, Shadowland: Daughters of the Shadow #1-3, Shadowland: Bullseye, Elektra, Ghost Rider, Spider-Man, Thunderbolts #148–149, Daredevil: Reborn #1-4, Dark Reign: The List - Daredevil, Shadowland: After the Fall	February 2018	978-1302910372

== See also ==
- List of events of the Marvel Universe
