= Luke Cage =

Marvel Comics character

- Luke Cage as depicted in New Avengers vol. 2 #1 (June 2010). Art by Stuart Immonen.

Publication information
- Publisher: Marvel Comics
- First appearance: Luke Cage, Hero for Hire #1 (June 1972)
- Created by: Archie Goodwin; George Tuska; Roy Thomas; John Romita Sr.

In-story information
- Full name: Lucas Cage (legally changed from Carl Lucas)
- Species: Human mutate (Note: In Marvel comics, the term "mutate" is used as a noun to designate characters that received superpowers from an external source, as opposed to Marvel's mutants.)
- Team affiliations: Avengers; New Avengers; Heroes for Hire; Defenders; Fantastic Four; Marvel Knights; Thunderbolts; The Crew
- Partnerships: Iron Fist; Misty Knight; Colleen Wing; Jessica Jones
- Notable aliases: Power Man; Lucas Cage
- Abilities: Superhuman strength, stamina, and durability; Regenerative healing factor; Nigh-invulnerability

Lucas Cage, born Carl Lucas and also known as Power Man, is a superhero appearing in American comic books published by Marvel Comics. Created by Archie Goodwin, George Tuska, Roy Thomas, and John Romita Sr. in 1972, he was the first African-American superhero by Marvel Comics to be the main character in his own series. Stories featuring Luke Cage often relate to issues of race and class. His origin invokes criticism of police brutality and the prison system in the United States, and his 1970s stories focus on his efforts to support himself as a businessman. His creators were initially inspired by Blaxploitation cinema and subsequently by the Black Power movement. The character was intensely masculine and sexualized in his 20th century appearances, but these aspects were tempered as Cage's focus shifted to his life as a husband and father.

Cage was introduced in Luke Cage, Hero for Hire #1 (June 1972). His series was renamed Power Man with issue #17 (1974) and then Power Man and Iron Fist with issue #50 (1978), when Iron Fist became his costar. The series ended after issue #125 (1986), and he then briefly starred in the comic book series called "Cage" in (1992). The character was generally neglected and received little commercial success or broad popularity in the 1990s.

However, writer Brian Michael Bendis redesigned Cage for Alias (2001), and the character then appeared in another series titled Cage (2002) under the Max imprint. In 2004, Bendis incorporated Cage into the Avengers. He wrote Cage as a main character in New Avengers (2004–2010), The Pulse (2004), The Mighty Avengers (2013–2015), and The Defenders (2017–2018). Other series featuring Luke Cage have been published, such as Luke Cage: Noir (2009), a new volume of Power Man and Iron Fist (2016), the comedic series CAGE! (2016), and Luke Cage: Gang War (2023).

In his origin story, Carl Lucas gained superhuman strength and unbreakable skin after being the subject of an experiment while in prison. Having been falsely imprisoned, he uses his powers to escape and starts a business as the Hero for Hire under the name Luke Cage. In appearances over the following decades, he teams up with Iron Fist and clears his name. He marries Jessica Jones and they have a daughter together while Cage joins the New Avengers, the Mighty Avengers, and the Defenders. Cage runs in the New York mayoral election against Wilson Fisk and is elected mayor. Along with Iron Fist and Jessica Jones, Cage's supporting characters include his friend David Griffith and the doctor Claire Temple. His archenemy is Diamondback, a career criminal and Cage's friend-turned-enemy who caused him to be wrongfully arrested. Other recurring villains faced by Cage include Black Mariah, Cockroach Hamilton, Comanche, Cottonmouth, Gideon Mace, and Shades.

Mike Colter portrays Luke Cage in the Marvel Cinematic Universe television series Jessica Jones (2015; 2019), Luke Cage (2016–2018), The Defenders (2017), and Daredevil: Born Again (2026–present). The character has also appeared in various animated series and video games.

== Publication history ==
=== Creation ===
Luke Cage, Hero for Hire #1 (cover-dated June 1972), the debut of Luke Cage. Cover art by John Romita Sr.

Luke Cage was created by Archie Goodwin, John Romita Sr., Roy Thomas, and George Tuska. Marvel Comics publisher Stan Lee wanted to create a character based on the Blaxploitation subgenre of action films popular in the 1970s. The films, such as Shaft (1971) and Super Fly (1972), were the inspiration for Luke Cage. Lee worked with Thomas on the initial premise of a hero who asks payment for his work. Thomas attributed many of the creative decisions to Lee.

When developing Cage's abilities, Thomas was inspired by the Philip Wylie novel Gladiator (1930). In the novel, the character Hugo Danner discovers he is bulletproof after examining the impact of machine gun fire on his body, during World War I. Dan Hagen of Back Issue! compared Cage's origin to The Count of Monte Cristo by Alexandre Dumas; in response, Thomas said that the book may have had "a conscious or subconscious effect" on Lee or Goodwin.

Romita created Cage's initial design, and Tuska became the series' main artist. Goodwin wrote the first stories featuring Luke Cage. Billy Graham, the only Black artist working at Marvel at the time, was also brought on to ensure that Tuska's "African-American characters looked African-American". It was determined that he would at some point take over as artist for the character.

Marvel had previously created two Black superheroes: Black Panther and Falcon. However, Luke Cage was the first of Marvel's African-American characters to lead his own series. He was developed during a period of increasing racial diversity in comic books and popular media more broadly. American society at the time was undergoing a shift in racial attitudes, and calls for social justice and against racism were increasing. The character was distinct from other superheroes because he lived in poverty and struggled with practical affairs like supporting himself and starting a business. During internal deliberations, Marvel determined that Cage had the best marketing potential of their properties.

=== 1970s ===
Cage was introduced in Luke Cage, Hero for Hire, in 1972. The series alternated between its continuing plot of Cage trying to support himself and address problems in his personal life, alongside secondary plots each issue in which Cage completed a job as a hero for hire. Goodwin wrote the first four issues before Steve Englehart became the writer. Tuska was the series' artist, but Graham worked as inker and frequently shared responsibilities with Tuska as penciler. Englehart and Tuska came into conflict while working on Luke Cage, Hero for Hire. Englehart wrote subplots for the series, only for Tuska to disregard them and say "I didn't feel like drawing that". In issue #8 (1973), Luke Cage is described with the racial slur schvartze. According to Englehart, he was not aware it was a slur and was tricked into adding it by Tuska. Englehart printed an apology in issue #11.

Marvel made a stronger push toward representation of Black characters in 1973. Reframing the character, the company announced that "much of Cage's jivin' slang will be eliminated". Cage made an appearance outside of his own series when he fought with Spider-Man in The Amazing Spider-Man #123 (1973). The issue was illustrated by Gil Kane and John Romita Sr. Graham became the main artist for Luke Cage beginning with issue #13 (1973). The character and the series were renamed "Power Man" in issue #17 (1974). The name was inspired by the Black power movement, and according to Thomas the change was made in an attempt to increase sales. Cage appeared in The Defenders #17–19 (1974–1975), which had him fight the Defenders before they work together to stop the Wrecking Crew.

Power Man did not have a dedicated writer in the issues after Englehart's departure, so several writers briefly contributed. Tuska remained active as an artist for the series at this time. Don McGregor eventually requested writing duties for Power Man, and he worked on issues #28 and #30–35. A production problem prevented him from writing issue #29, leaving issue #28's cliffhanger open as an alternate story was featured in issue #29. McGregor made various additions to the character during his brief run, including several of Cage's classic villains. McGregor glamorized Cage's ability to persevere through suffering. The series went through several artists at this time. Cage also co-starred in Fantastic Four #168 (1976), when Roy Thomas used him to briefly replace the Thing as a member of the Fantastic Four. Marv Wolfman became Cage's writer after issue #36 (1976). Power Man was accompanied by an annual edition the same year, created by Chris Claremont. The duo of Claremont and John Byrne were then made artists for the series, continuing a period of collaborations between the two.

The martial arts superhero Iron Fist joined the series as a co-star in issue #48 (1978), and the series was renamed Power Man and Iron Fist with issue #50 (1978). They were grouped together after neither character proved popular enough to support his own series. Jo Duffy, a fan of both characters, was appointed as its writer at her request beginning with issue #56. Cage's innocence was proven in this story arc, and he was no longer written as an escaped convict. To elevate Luke Cage and Iron Fist, Duffy and artist Trevor Von Eeden began with a story in which the characters encountered the X-Men and the Living Monolith before returning them to more mundane environments.

=== 1980s–1990s ===
Power Man and Iron Fist received its long-term artist when Kerry Gammill was added for issue #61 (1980). Gammill continued drawing the series until issue #79 (1982), and Duffy continued writing it until issue #84 (1982). Their editor, Dennis O'Neil, disliked the light-hearted and humorous tone that Duffy had used for the series. Denys Cowan took over for Gammill. Bob Layton was announced as Duffy's replacement, but he never began and O'Neil filled in until Kurt Busiek became writer with issue #90 (1983). Busiek continued the light-hearted tone until he too was removed from the series, ending his run on issue #102 (1984). The series had no dedicated creators or storylines until Christopher Priest became the writer from issue #111 (1984) until the series was cancelled with issue #125 (1986), working alongside artist M. D. Bright. Priest, who is himself Black, was criticized within Marvel for reducing Cage's use of stereotypical Black dialogue.

For the remainder of the 1980s after Marvel canceled Power Man and Iron Fist, Cage made guest appearances in other comics. He was revitalized with a new series, Cage, in 1992. This series removed the Blaxploitation elements of the character, tempering him and putting him in common street clothes. With minimal resemblance to the original depiction of the character, the series was not well-received and it sold poorly. It was canceled after 20 issues. Cage then made an appearance in Marvels (1994), where artist Alex Ross used Jim Brown as a model for Luke Cage's design. The character made an appearance in a parody edition of What If where he found and wielded Mjolnir, the hammer of Thor. Another attempt was made to revive the character in 1996 with the publication of a new Luke Cage and Iron Fist duo series, Heroes for Hire, but it was canceled after 19 issues.

=== 2000s ===
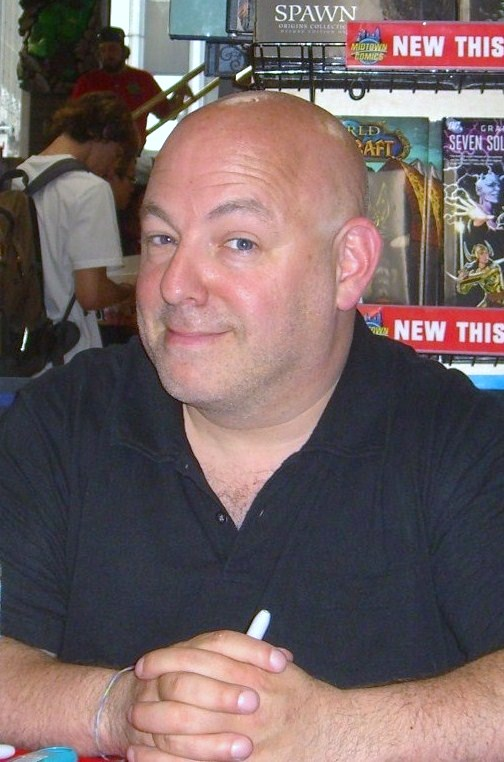
Brian Michael Bendis (pictured in 2010) redesigned Luke Cage and used him in several comic book series.

By the start of the 21st century, Luke Cage was not meaningfully used by Marvel and was seen as outdated following the end of the Blaxploitation era. The writer Brian Michael Bendis created an updated version of Luke Cage in 2001, making him a supporting character in the series Alias, in which Cage is a romantic interest for the main character Jessica Jones. According to Bendis, his colleagues teased him for his insistence on the character's inclusion, calling it a "man-crush". A new Cage series was published under the adult-targeted Max imprint in 2002, featuring more explicit content. Created by Brian Azzarello, Richard Corben, and José Villarrubia, this series portrayed the Black community in a more stereotypical way and depicted Cage working as muscle for hire in less heroic circumstances. It has been described as Luke Cage redesigned for hip-hop culture.

Bendis used Cage again as a main character in New Avengers, which took place after the 2004 "Avengers Disassembled" storyline. He decided to have Cage shave his head in the second issue, inspired by a similar style change by comedian Damon Wayans, and the new look became standard for the character's appearance. Cage concurrently returned in Bendis's next Jessica Jones series, The Pulse, beginning in 2004. In The Pulse, Jones is pregnant with Cage's daughter, and issues #11–14 (2005–2006) feature the child's birth and Cage's subsequent marriage proposal to Jones. Her acceptance and their wedding are depicted in The New Avengers Annual #1 (2006). Cage was also included as one of the guest stars in the Black Panther storyline "Bad Mutha" in 2006, along with Blade and Brother Voodoo.

Cage's continued appearances in The New Avengers focused on his new life as a husband and father. This coincided with the company-wide storylines Civil War, Secret Invasion, "Dark Reign", and Avengers vs. X-Men, between 2005 and 2012. The plot of Civil War sees Cage compelled to fight against other superheroes and send his family into hiding. Cage invokes Black history in order to challenge Iron Man's strict adherence to the law, recalling slavery and the civil rights movement. Cage then has his own subplot in Secret Invasion, in which he aligns with Norman Osborn in order to locate his kidnapped daughter. Cage remained a major character in The New Avengers until its conclusion in The New Avengers: Finale (2010). He was simultaneously a major character in House of M: Avengers (2008), which depicted him in his original design. A film noir version of Luke Cage was also depicted in Luke Cage Noir (2009–2010), set in the 1920s.

=== 2010s–2020s ===
Cage was retained in a 2010 relaunch of The New Avengers, where he was made team leader. The New Avengers: Luke Cage was published in 2010, containing the three-part "Town Without Pity" storyline set in Philadelphia, written by John Arcudi and illustrated by Eric Canete. The story depicted Cage fighting Hammerhead and Lionfang during Marvel's "Dark Reign" event. It was published alongside a one-shot in which Daredevil and Cage fight for charity, written by Antony Johnston and illustrated by Sean Chen. Avengers Origins: Luke Cage was then published in 2013, written by Michael Benson and Adam Glass. Cage was one of several Black superheroes teamed together in The Mighty Avengers (2013–2014) and Captain America and the Mighty Avengers (2014–2015).

A new volume of Power Man and Iron Fist began publication in 2016 as part of the All-New, All-Different Marvel branding, written by David F. Walker and illustrated by Sanford Greene. CAGE! was published the same year as a comedic interpretation of Cage's original design. This series, first announced in 2007, was written and illustrated by Genndy Tartakovsky. A new Luke Cage series began publication in 2017 to coincide with the Luke Cage television series. The first five issues made up the "Sins of the Father" story arc, written by David F. Walker and illustrated by Nelson Blake. The series was then rebranded under Marvel Legacy, which adjusted the series' numbering. The "Caged" story arc was published as issues #166–170. Walker remained as the writer while Guillermo Sanna and Marcio Menyz were its artists. It was canceled in 2018 after issue #170. Brian Michael Bendis wrote The Defenders with artist David Marquez in 2017, placing Cage in a team alongside Iron Fist, Jessica Jones, and Daredevil to coincide with the television adaptations of these characters. The same year, Cage also appeared in a new team led by Black Panther, The Crew in a series written by Ta-Nehisi Coates. Cage worked alongside Storm, Misty Knight, and Manifold.

The three-issue series Luke Cage: Everyman was released in 2018 as the second publication in the Marvel Digital Original line, written by Anthony Del Col and illustrated by Jahnoy Lindsay.

A miniseries titled Luke Cage: City of Fire began production, written by Ho Che Anderson, with an expected release date in 2021. The series would have featured a story about police brutality based on the murder of George Floyd, but Marvel canceled it shortly before its release out of fear that it would provoke retaliation. According to Anderson, executives told him it was canceled so he would not be "attacked by right-wing nuts". Cage appeared as a major character in the "Devil's Reign" event in 2021, which ended with him becoming mayor of New York City. He then received his own tie-in series for the "Gang War" event that began in 2023. Luke Cage: Gang War, written by Rodney Barnes and illustrated by Ramon Bachs, depicts Cage's time as mayor and his decision to resume vigilantism.

== Characterization ==
=== Fictional character biography ===
Carl Lucas is a resident of Harlem. He was in a gang with his friend Willis Stryker until he experienced regrets about his criminal life and left the gang. When Stryker's girlfriend breaks up with him and seeks out Lucas, Stryker frames Lucas for drug possession. Lucas is sent to prison and is abused when he refuses to be an informant. He agrees to a dangerous experiment in the hope that it will help him get parole, but a racist corrections officer sabotages the experiment in an attempt to kill him. The experiment inadvertently gives Lucas superhuman strength and nearly impenetrable skin, which he uses to escape. When he stops a robber and receives a cash reward, he decides to start a business as a super-powered private detective. Lucas takes on a new name, Luke Cage, and he later starts calling himself Power Man.

When Cage is blackmailed by Bushmaster to kidnap Misty Knight, he meets Knight's boyfriend, Iron Fist. They work together to prove Cage's innocence, and they become partners as the Heroes for Hire. Cage becomes a fugitive again when he is blamed for Iron Fist's apparent death, but Iron Fist is eventually found to be alive. For a time, Cage moves his Hero for Hire operations to Chicago. Cage moves away from hero work as a bodyguard and bar owner, and he has a sexual encounter with his friend Jessica Jones. The two fall in love while working on a bodyguard job together for Matt Murdock, Daredevil's alter ego. They go on to have a daughter together and marry each other. Cage is one of several heroes who responds to a breakout from the supervillain prison the Raft, and they join together to become the New Avengers. He refuses to register after the Superhero Registration Act is passed and he aligns with Captain America's resistance, separating him from his family and making him a fugitive.

Cage's daughter is kidnapped by a shapeshifting alien Skrull during the Secret Invasion. In his desperation, he agrees to register and aligns with then-head of S.H.I.E.L.D., the villain Norman Osborn, and he recovers his daughter. He then attacks Osborn's henchmen, sparing Osborn only because of his assistance in finding the child. After Osborn's rule ends, Cage becomes the leader of another group of New Avengers and takes command of the reformed supervillain team the Thunderbolts. Cage retires from heroism after realizing the stakes of living his lifestyle while having a child, but he later joins the Mighty Avengers and then a new version of the Defenders. He is diagnosed with chronic traumatic encephalopathy as a consequence of his violent lifestyle. Cage runs to be mayor of New York, challenging Mayor Wilson Fisk. Following Fisk's arrest, Cage runs unopposed and is elected.

=== Personality and motivations ===
As depicted in the comics, Cage was shaped by his life in poverty in Harlem, where he was forced to become a criminal and learn to survive. While in poverty, he expresses more frustration when his enemies destroy his office than when they attack him personally as he understands that he will have to pay to fix the damage to his office. He has disdain for the wealthy East Side in Manhattan, seeing the neighborhood and its residents as artificial. He takes satisfaction in his business as he becomes more successful and upgrades his office. After moving his operations to Times Square, he retains his previous office over a grindhouse theater in a poorer part of the city to ensure that he is still accessible to the working class. His financial concerns are alleviated after he partners with his wealthier ally Iron Fist.

The character's anger defines Cage when he is first introduced, bitter about the injustice of his false imprisonment. His experiences living in Harlem and being experimented on in prison made him cynical. Cage is believed dead after he receives his powers, separating him from society more than a traditional superhero. Rather than act purely out of altruism, Cage seeks compensation for heroic acts. He believes that altruism is unrealistic when race and class are taken into consideration. Despite this, he sometimes refuses to accept a fee. In the third issue of Luke Cage, Hero for Hire, Cage returns his fee to a widowed mother whose husband had hired him.

Cage is portrayed as highly masculine, especially in the context of African-American culture. This is closely associated with his origin inspired by Blaxploitation films, where hypermasculinity is common. He is written as promiscuous and highly sexual, especially in his youth. He is embarrassed by this past when his old sexual partners continue making advances after he is married. Other characters understand him to be a "cape chaser" who had regular sexual encounters with female superheroes. As Cage's character evolved, more nuanced traits were introduced as he became husband and father and as he balanced his superheroism between street crime and more traditional supervillains. His characterization underwent a major shift in The New Avengers, which reframed him as a paternal figure who cares for his infant daughter while serving as a mentor for younger superheroes who are racial minorities. He is shown as a responsible, caring father while other heroes are fighting. Part of his motivation for joining the team is so that his soon-to-be-born daughter will be able to hear that her father was an Avenger. This leads to further conflict with Cage's split roles as a father and a superhero, as the dangerous nature of his work puts his daughter at risk and causes his wife to doubt his sincerity about prioritizing the family. His romantic relationship with Jessica Jones became his primary focus, with that focus eventually shared with the daughter they have together.

Aesthetically, Cage is not a traditional superhero. He does not consistently use a superhero name or wear a superhero costume. He does not have a secret identity, though he changed his name to Luke Cage while in hiding after escaping prison. Cage wears an extravagant street-clothes outfit in his original design, featuring a bright yellow top with a collar and open front, black spandex pants, yellow-trimmed boots, a chain belt, metal bracelets, and a metal headband. This outfit both reflects his inability to afford more sophisticated costumes and balances the seriousness of the character. When the character chooses these outfits, he remarks that the chains will remind him of his past imprisonment, as well as the possibility that he could be imprisoned again. He similarly chooses the name Cage to invoke his origin as a prisoner. He later wears more casual outfits like a t-shirt with jeans. Cage is associated with a catchphrase, "Sweet Christmas!", which he often exclaimed in the 1970s.

=== Powers and abilities ===
Luke Cage has superhuman strength and durability. He gained his powers through an experiment, described as an "electro-biochemical process" that was intended to improve human healing by speeding up cellular regeneration. Cage's skin is as strong as steel, his muscles and bones are much denser than those of an average human, and he can heal three times as quickly. Cage's powers are more defensive than active, making him a relatively passive character in combat. When the character was created, a rule was implemented that he could not use his powers to leap high into the air, but this rule was broken by his sixth appearance. Besides his superhuman abilities, Cage is depicted as street smart and a skilled fighter.

== Themes ==
Race and its social implications are prominent in Luke Cage stories. Luke Cage is symbolic of the resistance to racism that defined the Black identity in the United States, and the character explores problems faced by African Americans because of institutional racism. Cage's symbolism arises from his being a Black man with bulletproof skin. The fact that his powers are derived from his skin creates a contrast where his skin is both what causes him to be persecuted and what gives him the ability to fight back. The character originated from the Black power movement, although this interpretation of the character receded by the 1980s as the Black power movement declined in prominence and the Black power hero moved out of the cultural zeitgeist.

Prison reform had become a major political issue in the years leading up to Cage's debut, and Luke Cage, Hero for Hire introduced the character alongside a criticism of police brutality and the prison system in the United States. Cage's origin as both a superhero and a prisoner makes him distinct from other superheroes with more traditionally noble origins. Unlike the heroic experiment that gave Captain America his superpowers and the science-fiction themes of later superheroes, Cage is given his powers in the less glamorous environment of a prison experiment. Shortly after Cage's first appearance, news of the Tuskegee Syphilis Study became public as a real-life example of Black men being experimented on.

Issues relating to class are a regular feature in Luke Cage stories, and Cage's persona draws from a tradition of urban folk heroes who represent the working class. This helped to differentiate him from Marvel's other well known Black superhero of the time, the Black Panther, the king of a highly developed African nation. Cage's origin gives focus to the financial aspects of superheroism as the character has to fund his own operations. Cage operates out of New York like many other Marvel Comics superheroes, but his origin is in the inner city as opposed to more affluent or suburban areas. This setting depicts less desirable aspects of New York City relative to the settings of other superhero stories, showing a poorer, rougher area.

Cage's public blending of his career and his heroism subverts the usual trope of heroes trying to keep these things separate. The transactional nature of Cage's heroism challenges the notion of a selfless hero being morally superior. It indicates that social privilege and financial stability are necessary for a hero to act without compensation, which is not an option for working class heroes like Luke Cage. This theme became less prominent a few years into Luke Cage's publications as the series shifted toward more traditional heroics to boost sales. Cage's balancing of his life as a father and as a superhero then became a major theme used to comment on the fatherhood of Black men and domestic life more generally. Several franchise-wide storylines took place while Cage learned to become a father, presenting obstacles for the character in his attempts to prioritize his family. Cage's role in these stories subverts common ideas of absent fathers and masculinity being incompatible with domesticity when he remains committed to his responsibility as a father.

== Supporting characters ==
Luke Cage is closely tied to the character Iron Fist. They were brought together for the shared series Power Man and Iron Fist in 1978 where they came to be partners. Cage's primary romantic interest is Jessica Jones. Their relationship becomes central to his character after their marriage, and they have a daughter named Danielle. Cage formed a team, the Defenders, with Jones, Iron Fist, and Daredevil. He has worked with other teams, including the New Avengers.

In the first issues of his original series, Cage is established with the supporting characters Claire Temple, a doctor who operates a clinic with the man who gave Cage his powers, and David Griffith, the nephew of his landlord who becomes a friend of Cage. Cage's first love interest is Reva Connors. In his origin story, Willis Stryker competes with Cage for her attention, eventually framing Cage and getting him sent to prison. Connors is then accidentally killed in a mob hit targeting Stryker.

=== Villains ===
Luke Cage's original nemesis is his friend-turned-rival Willis Stryker, who calls himself Diamondback. The pair were partners who became involved in gangs, but Cage left the lifestyle while Stryker became more involved in it. Diamondback becomes his own version of a hero for hire, using trick knives with different functionalities. Shades and Comanche are also villains Cage encounters in his origin, meeting them as fellow prisoners during his origin story. Other recurring villains introduced in Cage's original series include Gideon Mace, Black Mariah, Chemistro, Stiletto, Steeplejack, Cockroach Hamilton, Mr. Fish, and Piranha Jones.

Cage's earliest villains were underworld criminals, typically working for a crime boss or a criminal organization. He has faced several villains of this type, including Cottonmouth, Diamondback, Steeplejack, and Stiletto. Many of Cage's villains are people who became criminals because they were unable to achieve social mobility, including Big Brother, Chemistro, Mr. Fish, and Piranha Jones. Cage shares the name "Power Man" with the villain Erik Josten, introduced in The Avengers #21 (1965), and the two first encounter one another in Power Man #21 (1974).

Power Man and Iron Fist writer Jo Duffy commented on the difficulty of writing villains for the titular characters, saying that they are too strong to fight common criminals but too weak to fight powerful supervillains. To address this, she introduced the superpowered swordsman El Águila and the scheming mountaineer Montenegro.

== Reception and legacy ==
Luke Cage was created as African-American heroes were first becoming acceptable to the American public, and the writers at Marvel developed the character to support this movement. Cage was positively received by readers when he was introduced, both for representation that came with an African-American superhero and for the means of exploring class and race in comic books. The 2016 television adaptation of Luke Cage similarly debuted during a period of renewed interest in how police brutality in the United States affects Black men.

Although the character was successful, Cage did not achieve the same popularity as Marvel's more well-known characters. Marvel introduced several Black superheroes shortly after Luke Cage's success, including Blade and Brother Voodoo in 1973 as well as Storm and Black Goliath in 1975. Black Panther received his own series in 1974. As solo characters, none of these were as successful as Luke Cage. Like these heroes, Cage was defined by his Blackness when he was introduced and was portrayed in a stereotypical manner, which received mixed responses from critics. Cage did not have significant effect on the Marvel Universe, leaving the niche of an influential African-American superhero unfilled for the time.

Several individual Luke Cage stories have received critical praise. Hero for Hire #9 (1973) depicted Cage pursuing one of Marvel's most imposing supervillains, Doctor Doom, over a $200 debt. Power Man and Iron Fist #50 (1978) saw Cage clear his name as a fugitive and marked the beginning of his sharing a series with Iron Fist as the Heroes for Hire. New Avengers #22 (2006) defined the character's motives as he sided against Iron Man in the "Civil War" event. The 2009 miniseries Luke Cage: Noir, which reimagined Cage as a detective in a story, praised for its style.

Cage was satirized by the Milestone Comics character "Buck Wild, Mercenary Man". The actor Nicolas Cage, born Nicolas Coppola, is a fan of Luke Cage and chose his stage name as an homage to the character.

Wizard Magazine ranked Luke Cage 34th in their "Top 200 Comic Book Characters" list. Gizmodo ranked Luke Cage 23rd in their "Every Member Of The Avengers" list. Entertainment Weekly ranked Luke Cage 11th in their "Let's rank every Avenger ever" list.

== In other media ==
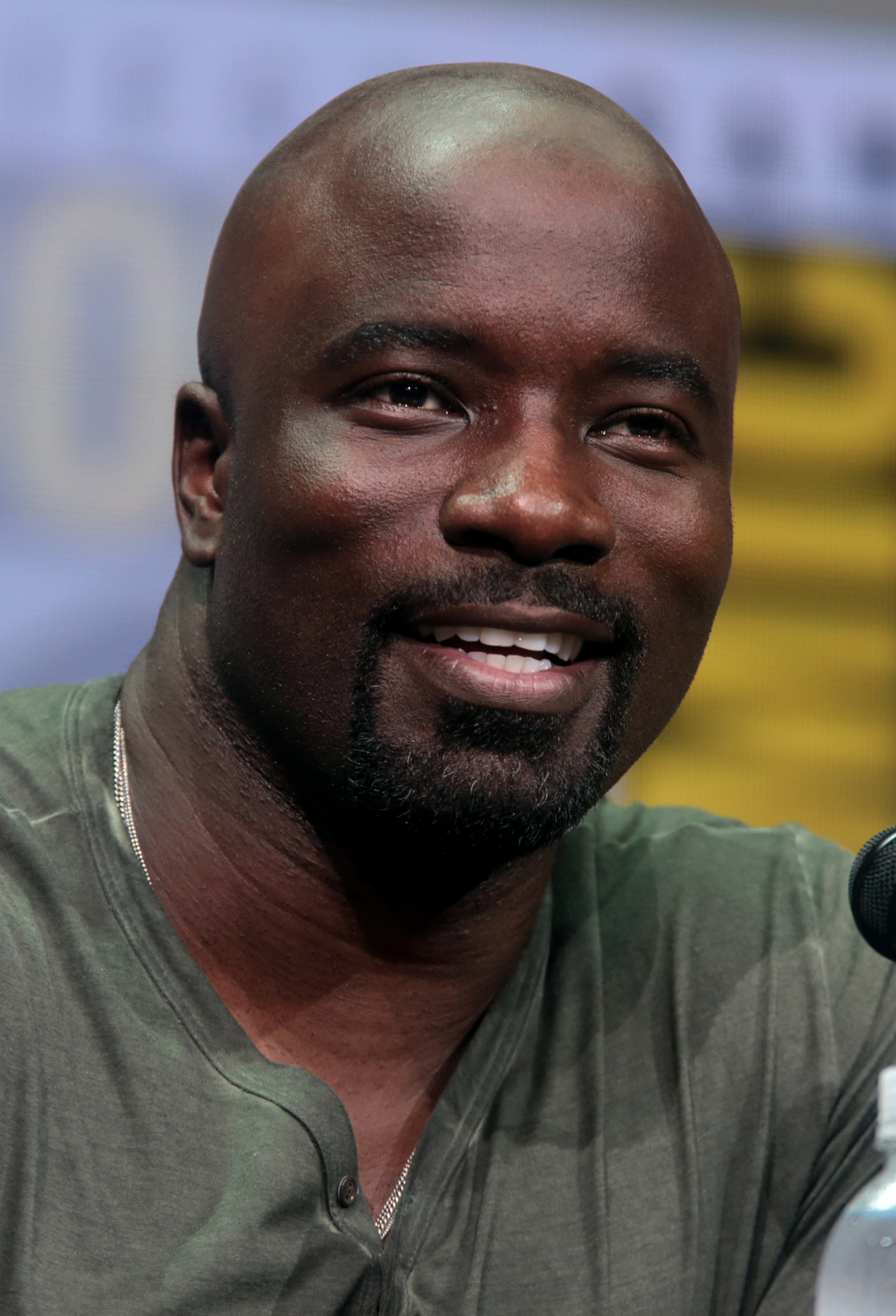
Luke Cage is portrayed by Mike Colter in the Marvel Cinematic Universe.

Mike Colter portrayed Luke Cage in Jessica Jones (2015; 2019), Luke Cage (2016–2018), and The Defenders (2017) of Marvel's Netflix television series within the Marvel Cinematic Universe. This version of the character returned for a cameo appearance in the second season of the Disney+ series Daredevil: Born Again (2026). He is set to return for the upcoming third season (2027).

Adaptations of Luke Cage have appeared in animated series like Ultimate Spider-Man, The Super Hero Squad Show and The Avengers: Earth's Mightiest Heroes. The character appears in several video games, including the Marvel: Ultimate Alliance series, Marvel Heroes, and Lego Marvel's Avengers.

Quentin Tarantino considered making a film about Luke Cage in the early 1990s, hoping to cast Laurence Fishburne in the starring role, but he lost interest in the idea after his friends insisted that this was poor casting and he should instead choose Wesley Snipes. Producer Edward R. Pressman worked with Stan Lee on a possible Luke Cage film in 1995 starring Fishburne as the titular character. It would have been written by John Singleton and Joseph Dougherty, adapting the original series and the 1992 Cage miniseries and pitting Cage against the villain Moses Magnum. Another possible Luke Cage film was optioned by Columbia Pictures in 2003 with Ben Ramsey writing and John Singleton directing. Singleton considered Tyrese Gibson for the role of Luke Cage and Terrence Howard as Diamondback.

S. A. Cosby wrote a novel in the Luke Cage series. It was published by Hyperion Avenue in 2026.

== Notes ==
- Bealer, Tracy L. (2017). ""The Man Called Lucas": Luke Cage, Mass Incarceration, and the Stigma of Black Criminality". Inks: The Journal of the Comics Studies Society. 1 (2): 165–185. doi:10.1353/ink.2017.0012. ISSN 2473-5205.
- Borenstein, Eliot (2023). Marvel Comics in the 1970s: The World inside Your Head. Cornell University Press. ISBN 978-1-5017-6783-8.
- Brown, Jeffrey A. (2021). Panthers, Hulks and Ironhearts: Marvel, Diversity and the 21st Century Superhero. Rutgers University Press. ISBN 978-1-9788-0921-5.
- Bukac, Zlatko (2019). "Hypermasculinity and Infantilization of Black Superheroes: Analysis of Luke Cage and Rage Origin Stories". Reči. 11 (12): 69–81. doi:10.5937/reci1912069B. ISSN 1821-0686.
- Callahan, Timothy (2010). "Power Man and Iron Fist". Back Issue!. No. 45. TwoMorrows Publishing. pp. 3–12.
- Culver, Dennis (2018). Black Panther: The Illustrated History of a King. Insight Comics. ISBN 978-1-68383-185-3.
- Davis, Blair (2018). "From the Streets to the Swamp: Luke Cage, Man-Thing, and the 1970s Class Issues of Marvel Comics". In DiPaolo, Marc (ed.). Working-Class Comic Book Heroes: Class Conflict and Populist Politics in Comics. University Press of Mississippi. pp. 149–168. ISBN 978-1-4968-1667-2.
- Eury, Michael (2005). "African–American Heroes: A History of Blacks in American Comic Books". Back Issue!. No. 8. TwoMorrows Publishing. pp. 2–13.
- Fawaz, Ramzi (2016). The New Mutants: Superheroes and the Radical Imagination of American Comics. NYU Press. ISBN 978-1-4798-1433-6.
- Fentiman, David (2019). Marvel Encyclopedia (New ed.). DK. ISBN 978-1-4654-7890-0.
- Friedenthal, Andrew J. (2021). The World of Marvel Comics. Routledge. ISBN 978-1-000-43111-7.
- Hagen, Dan (2019). "Luke Cage, Hero for Hire". Back Issue!. No. 114. TwoMorrows Publishing. pp. 3–15.
- Howe, Sean (2012). Marvel Comics: The Untold Story. HarperCollins. ISBN 978-0-06-221811-7.
- Lackaff, Derek; Sales, Michael (2013). "Black Comics and Social Media Economics". In Howard, Sheena C.; Jackson, Ronald L. (eds.). Black Comics: Politics of Race and Representation. A&C Black. ISBN 978-1-4411-3528-5.
- Nama, Adilifu (2011). Super Black: American Pop Culture and Black Superheroes. University of Texas Press. ISBN 978-0-292-74252-9.
- Porras Sánchez, María; Vilches Fuentes, Gerardo, eds. (2023). Precarious Youth in Contemporary Graphic Narratives: Young Lives in Crisis. Routledge. ISBN 978-1-032-12359-2.
  - Gual Boronat, Óscar; Millanes Vaquero, Mario. "What Happens to a Dream Deferred: Super Villains of African Descent in Classic Marvel Era". In Porras Sánchez & Vilches Fuentes (2023).
  - McCausland, Elisa; Salgado, Diego. "Super-Precariat: Socioeconomic Fictions and Realities of Superhero Comic Books". In Porras Sánchez & Vilches Fuentes (2023), pp. 125–136.
- Ridout, Cefn, ed. (2017) [2008]. Marvel Year By Year: A Visual History Updated and Expanded. DK. ISBN 978-1-4654-5550-5.
- Smith, Troy D. (2024). Shaolin Brew: Race, Comics, and the Evolution of the Superhero. University Press of Mississippi. ISBN 978-1-4968-5168-0.
