= The Superior Foes of Spider-Man =

Marvel Comics series

Superior Foes of Spider-Man
- Promotional cover to Superior Foes of Spider-Man #1

Publication information
- Publisher: Marvel Comics
- Schedule: Monthly
- Format: Ongoing series
- Genre: Superhero
- Publication date: July 3, 2013 – November 26, 2014
- No. of issues: 17
- Main character(s): Sinister Six (Boomerang, Beetle, Overdrive, Shocker, Speed Demon)

Creative team
- Written by: Nick Spencer; James Asmus (#10)
- Artist: Steve Lieber

The Superior Foes of Spider-Man was an ongoing comic book series published by Marvel Comics that debuted in July 2013. The series was written by Nick Spencer with artwork by Steve Lieber. It debuted as part of Superior Spider-Month which saw a major status quo change in Spider-Man storylines in the aftermath of Superior Spider-Man #13.

== Publication history ==
The Superior Foes of Spider-Man was announced alongside Superior Spider-Man Team-Up in May 2013 as a part of Marvel's Superior brand expansion during Superior Spider-Week.

== Plot ==
Boomerang now leads the Sinister Six, consisting of Shocker, Speed Demon, Overdrive, and the new Beetle. Following their defeat in Superior Spider-Man #1, and the loss of their sixth member Living Brain, Fred Myers (Boomerang) finds himself in prison. Needing to get out of jail, Myers hatches a layered scheme that has his former team post his bail. He has Chameleon help trick his team into helping him by promising him to steal the head of former New York crime kingpin Silvermane from current major crime kingpin Owl. With the head of Silvermane, Chameleon would have a legitimate claim to becoming the Boss of much of the organized crime in the city. Accepting the deal, Chameleon (disguised as Hammerhead) tricks Herman Schultz (Shocker), James Sanders (Speed Demon), Janice Lincoln (Beetle), and Overdrive coming back together and bailing out Myers under the guise that Myers has a jewel heist planned. The two stipulations being that legally Myers must attend a super villain support group led by reformed super villain Mach VII, and secretly Myers must have his team work for Chameleon without charge and without them finding out.

After learning that Myers is being tailed by superhero Mach VII, and deciding they have all the information they need to steal the head of Silvermane themselves, The Sinister Six call a vote and decide to oust Myers as leader. Myers needing his team to help repay his debt to Chameleon, tells Mach VII about the remaining four Sinister Six member's hidden base. Moments before the four are ready to leave for the heist against Owl, Luke Cage, and Iron Fist arrest them. Once in custody, Myers breaks them out and demands his leadership status back, the four not knowing it was Myers who manipulated events to his advantage agree. However, as they start to regroup Schultz pulls Myers aside and informs him he is aware of Myers working with The Chameleon, and he is also aware that he owes Chameleon a debt of some kind. Myers panicking makes up a lie which Schultz seems to believe, but Myers, unable to trust Schultz, pushes him off a bridge in an attempt to silence and murder him.

The next day the remaining members of the Sinister Six (now missing Living Brain and Shocker) start their heist on Owl's compound none the wiser of Myers' multiple back stabbings the day before. Things initially go well for the team despite heavy conflict, but Myers quickly splits off from his three remaining teammates and allows Sanders, Lincoln, and Overdrive to be captured by Owl's forces. Myers then reveals that at no point does he believe Owl ever had the head of Silvermane, nor does he even believes it exists. He tricked not only his team, but also The Chameleon, just to steal his real prize, a painting of Doctor Doom that Doom himself had commissioned years ago. Myers believes the painting to be of high worth, and escapes Owl's compound with the painting while leaving his former three teammates for dead. With all of his former teammates dead, and him being the only one who knows about the painting, Myers believes he can become a major crime lord all by himself without having to split the money.

However unbeknownst to Myers, the head of Silvermane does exist, and through a series of coincidences, Schultz who has survived Myers' murder attempt comes into possession of the head at a junkyard. Back in his base, Owl prepares to slowly torture and kill the three captured members. Lincoln then reveals to the shock of everyone that she is the daughter of the crime lord Tombstone and asked her father for rescue, to which he obliges. Owl escapes the ensuing chaos while Lincoln, Sanders, and Overdrive escape with Tombstone and his men. Realizing that Myers was lying to them the whole time, but not entirely sure to what degree, the three split up to find Myers. Myers himself is also having a hard time, after lying to Mach VII about his whereabouts the day before, he is then visited by the Chameleon who tortures him until finding the painting of Doom shoddily hidden in haste. The Chameleon then tells Myers that he is taking the painting as reparation, and that their business together is concluded.

Feeling at his lowest, Myers meets up with his new girlfriend at a bar and tells her that not only is he a super villain, but he also had just let the biggest score of his life slip though his fingers to Chameleon. At the end of the date, she convinces Myers to believe in himself as they kiss. The kiss is cut short by Bullseye who was hired at the request of Owl. Bullseye captures Myers and his girlfriend, but only after Myers shows his true colors yet again by offering to trade his life for hers to mimic Bullseye's infamous murder of Elektra. Owl reveals that this Bullseye is only a robot constructed by Tinkerer, and that he knows that Myers stole the painting of Doom. Myers then constructs another lie, saying that The Chameleon stole his identity and lead his team. Owl believing Myers to be of little threat and incapable of any real power plays, offers Myers a chance to prove his story. Myers then goes into Chameleon's base with a hidden camera, and manipulates Chameleon into mocking Myers while wearing Myers' face. Owl, who now believes Myers' lie, lets Myers live and plans to attack Chameleon in revenge with his original team and additional super-powered henchmen, dubbed the Sinister Sixteen. Myers this time lets Overdrive steal Doom's portrait. Shocker escapes Hammerhead, who was tipped off by Hydro-Man as to Shocker's location and possession of Silvermane's head, and meets up with the team at their safe-house. The team steal Silvermane's head, beat up Shocker and bury him alive in a grave, then decide to trade Silvermane's head with the Maggia, but unbeknownst to them they each made a secret pact to double-cross each other: Beetle asked her father to bring an army, Sander's asks Madame Masque, and Overdrive asks Mister Negative. The trade-off turns into a fiasco as the four armies battle. Hydro-Man, feeling guilty for betraying Shocker, rescues him from the grave.

Myers is nowhere to be seen since the whole fiasco was just an elaborate plot to steal some of Chameleon's shape-shifting serum, so he can pretend to be the Mets' pitcher, who was about to break his strikeout record. He calls his girlfriend to tell her to watch him on TV, but she turns out to actually be Black Cat, who stole the real Doom portrait hidden in his room. Owl then blackmails Myers to throw the game and not beat the record, but Myers throws the last strike anyway. Most of the team escape the battle and Shocker accidentally ends up saving the Maggia by knocking out the Punisher, who then crown as the new head of the Maggia Family.

The series ends with Myers at a bar, having just finished recounting the tale for another patron. Myers admits that he may have embellished, exaggerated, or lied at certain points. Myers asks the man what his name is, and the man says "Peter". Presumably, this man is Peter Parker.

== Collected editions ==
Title	Material collected	Date Published	ISBN
The Superior Foes of Spider-Man Vol. 1: Getting the Band Back Together	The Superior Foes of Spider-Man #1–6	March 11, 2014	978-0785184942
The Superior Foes of Spider-Man Vol. 2: The Crime of the Century	The Superior Foes of Spider-Man #7–11	August 12, 2014	978-0785184959
The Superior Foes of Spider-Man Vol. 3: Game Over	The Superior Foes of Spider-Man #12–17	February 10, 2015	978-0785191704
The Superior Foes of Spider-Man Omnibus	The Superior Foes of Spider-Man #1–17	February 16, 2016	978-0785198376

== Reception ==
The Superior Foes of Spider-Man garnered wide praise from both critics and fans, with a large fanbase amongst the comic community. Initially planned for just 12 issues, the series later expanded due to the popularity of the series. The series was regarded as a sleeper hit.

== Continuation ==
During his tenure on The Amazing Spider-Man (2018-2021), author Nick Spencer continued many of the plotlines established in Foes. Notably, he further developed the dynamic between Boomerang and Peter Parker, transitioning Boomerang from comedic antagonist to a figure grappling with morality and redemption.

== In Other Media ==
The Superior Foes make a cameo appearance in the opening of the Amazing Guardians story mode in Marvel Tokon: Fighting Souls, where they are swiftly defeated by Spider-Man and apprehended by Squirrel Girl.
