= Titania (Marvel Comics) =

Supervillain from Marvel Comics

Mary MacPherran Titania
- Titania as depicted in Old Man Hawkeye #12 (December 2018). Art by Marko Djurdjević.

Publication information
- Publisher: Marvel Comics
- First appearance: Secret Wars #3 (July 1984)
- Created by: Jim Shooter; Mike Zeck

In-story information
- Alter ego: Mary MacPherran
- Species: Human mutate
- Place of origin: Denver, Colorado
- Team affiliations: Masters of Evil; Frightful Four; The Worthy; Femizons; Illuminati
- Partnerships: Absorbing Man
- Notable aliases: Thunder Girl; Titania; Skirn
- Abilities: Superhuman strength, stamina, and durability; Expertise in brawling

Titania (Mary MacPherran) is a character appearing in American comic books published by Marvel Comics. Created by then-Editor-in-Chief Jim Shooter and Mike Zeck, the character first appeared in Secret Wars #3 (July 1984). MacPherran is the second character called Titania. She is the rival of the superhero Jennifer Walters / She-Hulk. Originally a supervillain, in later years, she has reformed into more of an antihero. The character has also been a member of the Masters of Evil and the Frightful Four at various points in her history.

The character made her live action debut in the Marvel Cinematic Universe Disney+ series She-Hulk: Attorney at Law (2022), portrayed by Jameela Jamil.

== Development ==
=== Concept and creation ===
Mary MacPherran is a real-life Marvel production assistant who was asked by Jim Shooter if it was permissible to name a character after her. In 2011, Shooter posted a photo on his blog of a group of Marvel staffers, with a caption identifying the real MacPherran. In a comment, Shooter said of MacPherran:

Wonderful, gentle, sweet Mary Mac was indeed a smidgen of the basis for Titania, who was a willowy young woman who became uber-robust and Hulk-level strong. If MM minded that I had a tough bad-girl inspired by her, and made the nod in her direction, she never mentioned it. And wicked-smart Volcana had a bit of Mary Jo Duffy at her core. It was a thing we did back when. Now, I suppose the creators would be sued.

— Jim Shooter

=== Publication history ===
Titania debuted in Secret Wars #3 (July 1984), created by writer Jim Shooter and artist Mike Zeck. She appeared in the 2015 Illuminati series, by Joshua Williamson.

== Fictional character biography ==
Born prematurely in a suburb of Denver, Colorado, Mary MacPherran grew up scrawny and short-statured, inspiring the popular Vanessa Ashwood at school to nickname her "Skeeter" (a slang word for mosquito). While a high school senior, Mary works as a salesclerk alongside her only friend, Marsha Rosenberg, to support her struggling family. Consistently bullied since childhood by the wealthy and cruel Vanessa and her friends, Mary grows resentful and fantasizes about gaining superpowers to become admired, and exact retribution on her tormentors.

After the second Spider-Woman (Julia Carpenter) makes one of her early appearances in their town, Marsha remarks that the new superheroine's reddish-blonde hair color matches Mary's. Mary then falsely confides to her friend that she is secretly Spider-Woman. Shortly afterward, Mary is invited to a fancy party at Vanessa's house where she realizes that her newfound popularity is due to Marsha spreading the false Spider-Woman rumor.

In the middle of the party, their section of Denver is torn from Earth and incorporated into the Beyonder's Battleworld. When the real Spider-Woman arrives on the scene to save the guests from a collapsing structure, the now-enraged Vanessa and her guests turn on Mary and Marsha, chasing them into the forests of Battleworld.

Scared and exhausted, the two girls are found by Doctor Doom. Realizing how emotionally malleable they are, he offers to give them powers if they will serve him; both girls agree.

=== Secret Wars ===
Using the highly advanced alien technology found in Doombase and by harnessing immense energies from the ferocious alien storm outside, Doom is able to reconstitute both Mary and Marsha from a molecular level and grant them new superhuman bodies. While Rosenberg (now known as Volcana) receives a fiery form composed of ionized plasma, MacPherran becomes tall, muscular, and physically attractive - the diametric opposite of her previous self.

Titania's physical changes come with changes in personality. Whereas Mary MacPherran had been small and timid, the newly named Titania (seemingly as strong as a Titan) is brash and confident. When Volcana melts machinery into a large pile of red-hot slag, Titania simply picks the heated mass up without harm or concern before hurling it with incredible ability. Soon after, she challenges Carl "Crusher" Creel, the Absorbing Man, to a fight which he refuses, stating that he has "nothing to prove... to a dame." Titania begins to work for Doom in earnest and joins his forces when they attack en masse. She battles Thor, Rogue and Wolverine, as well as the X-Men. She eventually gets the better of She-Hulk, beginning a long rivalry between the two.

When the heroes later storm Doombase to rescue She-Hulk, Titania is pitted against Spider-Man. Initially confident since he is much smaller and less imposing than She-Hulk, she panics upon realizing that Spider-Man's vastly superior speed, agility, reflexes, intelligence and years of experience against more powerful foes allow him to not only easily avoid her but also attack her with complete impunity. The fight ends when Spider-Man beats her into the ground, then picks her up and disdainfully tosses her through an exterior wall. During this fight, Titania's newfound arrogance quickly evaporates, giving way to what Spider-Man mockingly calls the "whining little wimp-ette" — it is clear that her arrogance masks the same insecure, fragile personality that she has always possessed. Mindful of this beating, Titania avoids coming into contact with Spider-Man while on Battleworld, and harbors a fear of him for some time after returning to Earth.

After her run-in with Spider-Man, the Absorbing Man and Titania begin a relationship. Once Owen Reece, the Molecule Man, manages to seal off the chunk of Denver and navigate it toward Earth, Creel and MacPherran finally abandon Doom's cause for the chance to go home.

Upon finally reaching Denver, MacPherran takes the opportunity to track down Vanessa Ashwood, whom she beats up and mocks before tearing her house down. However, she finds that getting revenge brings her no satisfaction, and that if anything, she genuinely regrets harming someone who poses absolutely no threat to her now.

=== Back to Earth ===
Once back on Earth, Titania and Absorbing Man continue to work as professional criminals by joining Baron Helmut Zemo's incarnation of the Masters of Evil. Their first assignment is to recruit Moonstone, which also prevents them from joining the main group in the assault on Avengers Mansion. To kill time, Titania robs a jewelry store and attracts the attention of Spider-Man. Too afraid to fight him, she runs but encounters him again at LaGuardia Airport. Titania avoids fighting, having Creel do so on her behalf. The sight of his near-defeat at Spider-Man's hands proves enough for Titania to temporarily overcome her 'arachnophobia', charging in to save her boyfriend. Creel ends the fight by threatening to destroy a plane full of innocents if Spider-Man refuses to leave the scene, which he reluctantly does.

The villain couple receive another assignment from the Masters: to kill Hercules who had been gravely injured by the Masters and was hospitalized. Despite being guarded by only Ant-Man (Scott Lang) and the Wasp, Hercules survives. Creel is stung by insects in human form and Titania is shrunk to the size of Wasp. She is taken to the Vault, a superhuman penitentiary.

The stay in the Vault does not last long. When Iron Man begins the "Armor Wars" (the battle to destroy or disable all enhanced armor types based on stolen Iron Man designs), it inevitably leads him to the Guardsmen who are the Vault's prison officers. The ensuing conflict creates a power failure, allowing Titania and Mister Hyde to escape. While Captain America manages to subdue and capture Hyde, his colleague D-Man is unsuccessful in apprehending Titania. When allowed the opportunity for a rematch, D-Man lets her escape because she is far stronger than him.

Using her newfound freedom, Titania travels to Washington, D.C. After losing a succession of battles with She-Hulk, Titania willingly returns to jail after falsely promising to end their feud.

Broken out yet again, Titania joins with the Wizard, Klaw and Hydro-Man to become the new Frightful Four. Battling the Fantastic Four with Titania taking on the Thing and Ms. Marvel, the team only wins due to help from Professor Gregson Gilbert's creation Dragon Man and Aron the Renegade Watcher. In the rematch, the Fantastic Four prevails only to have both teams imprisoned by Aron in suspended animation, using clones of the Fantastic Four to act out adventures he wished to witness. When both teams are freed, Aron chooses to witness the dreams of his clones instead and transports the Frightful Four back to The Vault, as a service to the Fantastic Four.

Titania permanently overcomes her fear of Spider-Man during the 1989–1990 "Acts of Vengeance" crossover, in which a conspiracy between Loki and the Wizard teams supervillains to fight enemies not usually their own. Titania is dismayed when Doctor Doom, her partner, tells her she would face She-Hulk and not Spider-Man. With the help of a behavior modification device secretly affixed to Titania, Doom stokes her pride and anger, allowing her to engage Spider-Man at the Daily Bugle offices. After Puma tears Doom's device from her, Titania cowers from Spider-Man, but he makes her realize that she had been fighting him the whole time, and resumes attacking. At the time, Spider-Man was temporarily bonded with the Uni-Power, making him Captain Universe. This grants him the power to render Titania unconscious in one massive energy discharge.

She is freed on the way to the Vault by Graviton who also collects the Trapster and the Brothers Grimm. All had been humiliated by Spider-Man in the Captain Universe guise and along with Chameleon and Goliath, they make a failing attempt to take revenge. Titania is once again humiliatingly defeated when Spider-Man tricks her into colliding with a city bus.

=== Finding romance ===
Escaping The Vault once again, Titania joins Superia's Femizons, as foes of Captain America and the Paladin. This does not work out and Titania resolves to track down her old flame – the Absorbing Man, finding him battling the Eric Masterson Thor. When she appears injured by a blow from Mjolnir, Creel intervenes and confesses his love for her, which she gladly reciprocates. Seeing this, Thor allows them to leave.

Though Creel decides to give up on crime and try to go straight, Titania quickly goes back to holding up stores. Concerned, Creel attempts to "scare her straight", collaborating with Thor in a ploy involving an exhibit at the Guggenheim Museum. While the appearance of Spider-Man and special police unit Code: Blue complicates matters, ultimately Titania remembers her love for Creel and the couple are ultimately given parole.

Creel continues to get mad at Mary for not managing to stay legal and violating their parole. In order to alleviate her stress, he arranges an official bout with She-Hulk, but Titania nonetheless decides to cheat and ends up losing the fight.

Titania and the Absorbing Man's wedding is attended by many supervillains. While the Avengers interrupt the ceremony, they soon depart. Titania quickly grows bored with her law-abiding reform, and after Absorbing Man tries to buy her a Valentine's present but is nonetheless attacked by the police, they accept having to live a life on the run from the law.

In need of funds the pair assumes the guises of Thunder Girl and Lightning Bolt in order to hunt Spider-Man for the reward offered by Norman Osborn. Despite Titania briefly contracting severe skin burns as a result of this escapade, the pair remains unable to reform and commit more robberies. Titania also continues to clash with She-Hulk.

=== Illness and recuperation ===
Despite her enhanced durability, Titania contracts cancer. Lacking both health insurance and money, Creel is forced to move her from the hospital to an abandoned building. Creel kidnaps Jane Foster and brings her to the abandoned building to treat Titania, whose condition is rapidly deteriorating. Due to a battle between Creel and Thor, the building collapses upon the two women. Weakened and barely conscious, but still massively strong, Titania is nonetheless able to save Foster from being killed by holding up the falling debris. Foster then uses her hospital privileges to get Titania a room and the treatment she needs.

In a "silent" story containing no word balloons, Captain America fights the Absorbing Man on Christmas Eve, then learns that Creel was trying to get enough money to buy a Christmas present for Titania. Cap then secretly delivers the present in Creel's place and remains outside their apartment window long enough to watch Titania pick up the gift. In an accompanying script excerpt, writer Dan Jurgens explains that Titania's illness has been cured.

During Christopher Priest's run on Deadpool, Titania appears as a roommate of Deadpool and the supervillain Constrictor, but is later revealed to be the shapeshifter Copycat. She was originally intended to be the real Titania, but Marvel editors came up with the Copycat explanation in order to resolve the continuity conflict with Dan Jurgens' cancer storyline simultaneously occurring in Thor.

=== Wielding the Power Gem ===
Titania proves unable to stay away from She-Hulk and undergoes an intense physical regimen to boost her abilities. However, She-Hulk had done so more efficiently, briefly reaching levels almost approaching those of the Hulk himself. Battered and inadvertently humiliated by her, Titania is offered the chance at revenge after obtaining the Power Gem, one of the legendary Infinity Gems, from its former owner, the former Champion of the Universe, now known as the Fallen One because of his own defeat at She-Hulk's hands. The Fallen One had agreed to cease using the Power Gem as a condition of his defeat but was free to gain his own revenge by proxy through Titania. After an initial defeat by the newly empowered Titania, She-Hulk tricks her into believing that she had killed the Jade Giantess in a second battle; Titania's initial rush of triumph suddenly melts into uncertainty, as she realized that her life now had no meaning or focus without the object of her obsessive hatred. She-Hulk (in her normal form as Jennifer Walters) then takes advantage of Titania's confusion to pluck the Power Gem from the criminal's forehead and uses the Gem's power to knock Titania out with a single punch.

Titania is incarcerated in the Lang Memorial Penitentiary, a.k.a. the Big House, a prison in which superhuman inmates are shrunk with Pym particles to less than an inch in height, to reduce both their chances of escape and their threat to guards and the public.

Titania appears as a member of Wizard's Frightful Four, battling the Fantastic Four on Saturn's moon, Titan. Titania is shown having been returned to the Big House. In the next issue, having escaped (though still shrunken to diminutive size), she is reunited with the Absorbing Man, and clashes again with She-Hulk. To save She-Hulk from the Absorbing Man, Jazinda uses the shrunken Titania as a hostage and throws her into the mouth of a shark.

Titania survives and later encounters X-Factor Investigations. She is seen at the Raft, commenting along with other female inmates on the prowess of the new warden Luke Cage.

=== Fear Itself ===
During the Fear Itself storyline, one of the seven Hammers of the Worthy lands near Titania after being launched to Earth by Serpent. When she lifts it, Titania is possessed by Skirn, Breaker of Men. Skirn then helps Creel find his own hammer in the capital of Hell. When they find his hammer, they come across a well-known thief who has a personal history with Skirn. The thief tries to take the hammer as his own, but Skirn quickly defeats him. War Machine, Iron Fist, and their allies appear and try unsuccessfully to keep the hammer from Creel, who becomes the host for Greithoth, Breaker of Wills when he grasps it. Shortly after the Worthy are defeated, a distraught Titania is shown in her prison cell, where she implores the personnel of the Raft to prevent Crossbones from stealing Skirn's hammer.

=== All-New Thor ===
When Absorbing Man and Titania rob an armored car, the female Thor appears to thwart their plans. Upon meeting Thor, Creel mocks her for being a woman and for having taken Thor's name for herself, which she answers by breaking his jaw. Titania then appears to confront her. Out of respect for what Thor was doing, she knocks out her husband with his own weapon and surrenders. Despite this surrender, and despite Titania having once saved her life, Thor hits her hard with Mjolnir, knocking her out.

=== Illuminati ===
Titania makes a serious attempt to reform; with She-Hulk's help, she gets a job running security for a pawnshop. Though she successfully stops a robbery by thugs armed with energy weapons, her powers attract the attention of Luke Cage and Iron Fist. Despite her innocence, the Heroes for Hire view her with suspicion and attempt to subdue her. In the middle of the fight, the Hood teleports Titania against her will back to his lair, where he invites her to join his incarnation of the Illuminati, promising a way out of supervillainy. She reluctantly agrees to join. It is revealed to the reader that Hood engineered the robbery and is manipulating Titania.

Of her new teammates, Titania is closest with her friend, the Wrecking Crew member Thunderball. Over the short life of this team, she fights various supervillains, has a rematch with Thor, and temporarily exhibits new mystical powers, which manifest themselves as purple energy discharges while she uses her super strength.

During the Avengers: Standoff! storyline, Titania and Hood attack Pleasant Hill to free Absorbing Man. There is some brief tension between the reunited couple when Titania overhears Creel confess that he had feelings for Elektra while he was under Kobik's brainwashing.

In the final issue of Illuminati, the Hood, having expanded his team of supervillains with the former inmates of Pleasant Hill, plots to kill the Avengers' family members out of revenge for the events of Avengers: Standoff!. Titania feels that this crosses a moral line and refuses to go along. In the ensuing argument, Hood reveals that he manipulated Titania into joining the team and that he used his dark magic to give her new powers. They fight, and Titania, suspecting that Hood's mystical cloak and use of dark magic is corrupting his mind, destroys the cloak (which also removes her new powers) telling Hood that she is saving him from himself. Titania and Absorbing Man resign themselves to remaining supervillains.

=== Teaming with Black Bolt ===
In the 2017 series Black Bolt, the Absorbing Man is shown in a cosmic prison, where he befriends the Inhuman king Black Bolt and a telepathic alien girl named Blinky. Creel is seemingly killed fighting the prison's jailer, but successfully frees his fellow inmates. Black Bolt and Blinky travel to Earth to inform Titania of her husband's sacrifice. She mourns his death and arranges his funeral, which is attended by Captain America, Thor, and the Wrecking Crew. After the funeral, Black Bolt is attacked by Lash. Titania helps fight off the Inhuman villains, but is unable to prevent them from kidnapping Blinky. After Jailer possesses Blinky to kill Black Bolt, Lockjaw takes Titania to Parkwood Cemetery, where Absorbing Man suddenly emerges from his grave. Absorbing Man and Titania help Black Bolt fight Blinky and drive Jailer out of him.

=== Working with Weapon H ===
Dario Agger hires Titania and an ex-S.H.I.E.L.D. operative named Angel to help a team led by Weapon H and Korg on a mission to Weirdworld. She calls Absorbing Man, warning him to stay out of trouble while she is away. As Weapon H leads the mission to Weirdworld, they are attacked by a tribe of blue-skinned humanoids called the Inaku, who blame them for breaking the Earth and allowing a shapeshifting race called the Skrullduggers to take their queen. Titania, Korg, and Man-Thing find Weapon H with the Skrullduggers under Morgan le Fay's control as they attack the Inaku village. When Morgan le Fay of Earth-15238 appears and is identified as the missing Inaku queen, Titania and Korg are attacked by Protector Hara, the Skrullduggers, and Weapon H. Man-Thing comes to Titania's defense. When Titania tries to get a Roxxon scientist to close the portal, she is blasted by Sonia Sung, Weapon H's wife, and a Roxxon employee. After Agger pays them the terms of their contract, Titania takes Blake, Korg, and Man-Thing out to a burger joint.

== Powers and abilities ==
Titania possesses immense strength that originally enabled her to match other individuals (such as the Thing), owing to cellular augmentation through radiation, but later increased after performing rigorous weightlifting training, and rivals She-Hulk herself. Titania's muscles produce considerably less fatigue toxins than a normal human, thus granting her superior stamina. Her body is completely resistant to physical attacks.

Titania can even withstand high caliber bullets, temperature extremes, falling from great heights, and severe blunt force trauma without sustaining injury.

Titania has extensive experience in street fighting techniques.

== Reception ==
=== Critical response ===
Renae Richardson of MovieWeb stated, "Titania has proved to be one of the strongest female villains in the Marvel universe. Based on the powers she has been given, she is invincible. She has super strength and endurance, which is unrivaled by many. Her strength fuels a weird entanglement between Titania and her nemesis. She-Hulk proves more than a worthy opponent." Drew Beaty of Screen Rant asserted, "While the shy Mary MacPherran may seem like a generic super-strong supervillain on the surface, Titania has gradually evolved from a B-list antagonist into a nuanced comic book character with over 30 years of Marvel Comics history behind her." Rob Bricken of Gizmodo included Titania in their "12 Marvel Villains Who Should Have Been in Thunderbolts" list. Mark Ginocchio of ComicBook.com ranked Titania 4th in their "10 More Characters We'd Like to See in Marvel's Agents of S.H.I.E.L.D. Season Two" list, writing, "Titania can be viewed as a viable threat as one of the Marvel Universe's strongest female characters." The A.V. Club ranked Titania 27th in their "29 Best Marvel Villains" list.

Screen Rant included Titania in their "15 Most Powerful She-Hulk Villains" list, and ranked her 7th in their "Fantastic Four: 10 Best Female Villains" list. Comic Book Resources ranked Titania 1st in their "Top 10 She-Hulk Villains" list, 1st in their "10 Villains Fans Hope To See In Marvel’s She-Hulk Series" list, 4th in their "10 Strongest Female Marvel Antagonists" list, 5th in their "Marvel: The 10 Strongest Female Villains" list, 8th in their "10 Most Powerful Members Of The Masters of Evil" list, and 10th in their "10 Most Evil Supervillain Couples In Marvel" list.

== Other versions ==
=== Amalgam Comics ===
Big Titania, a composite character based on Titania and DC Comics character Big Barda, appears in the Amalgam Comics one-shot Bullets and Bracelets.

=== Earth X ===
An alternate universe variant of Titania appears in Universe X.

=== House of M ===
An alternate universe variant of Titania appears in House of M. This version is a servant of the Hood who later joins Luke Cage's resistance.

== In other media ==
=== Television ===
- Mary MacPherran / Titania appears in the Avengers Assemble episode "Small Time Heroes", voiced by Clare Grant.
- Mary MacPherran / Titania appears in Hulk and the Agents of S.M.A.S.H., voiced again by Clare Grant. Throughout the series, she battles She-Hulk and the eponymous Agents of S.M.A.S.H. before eventually befriending her and joins the Leader's "Agents of C.R.A.S.H."
- Titania appears in She-Hulk: Attorney at Law (2022), portrayed by Jameela Jamil. This version is a social media influencer, skilled martial artist, and superhuman who seeks to prove herself the "strongest woman in the world".
- Titania appears in Lego Marvel Avengers: Mission Demolition, voiced by Julie Nathanson.

=== Video games ===
- Mary MacPherran / Titania appears as a boss in Iron Man and X-O Manowar in Heavy Metal, voiced by Shelley Futch.
- Mary MacPherran / Titania appears as a playable character in Marvel: Future Fight.
- Mary MacPherran / Titania appears as a playable character in Marvel Strike Force.
- Mary MacPherran / Titania appears as a playable character in Marvel Contest of Champions.
- Mary MacPherran / Titania appears as a playable card in Marvel Snap.
