= Owl (Marvel Comics) =

Marvel Comics fictional character

- Artwork for the cover of Daredevil (vol. 2) 78 (December 2005). Art by Alex Maleev.

Publication information
- Publisher: Marvel Comics
- First appearance: Daredevil #3 (August 1964)
- Created by: Stan Lee (writer); Joe Orlando (artist)

In-story information
- Alter ego: Leland Owlsley
- Species: Human mutate
- Team affiliations: "Owl Gang"; Gang of Four; Sinister Sixteen
- Abilities: Extremely skilled criminal organizer and money launderer; Superhuman sight and hearing; Enhanced strength, resiliency/resistance, reflexes/reactions and endurance; Hollow bones; Natural razor-sharp fangs and talons (with attachment devices); Ability to glide short distances

The Owl (Leland Owlsley) is a supervillain appearing in American comic books published by Marvel Comics. The character is depicted usually as an enemy of the superheroes Daredevil, Spider-Man, and Black Cat. Created by writer Stan Lee and artist Joe Orlando, the character first appeared in Daredevil #3 (August 1964).

The character has appeared in numerous media adaptations, including the television series Daredevil (2015), set in the Marvel Cinematic Universe in which he was played by Bob Gunton.

== Publication history ==
The character first appeared in Daredevil #3 (August 1964). He was a recurring foe of Daredevil during the 1960s and 1970s. Since then, he has made occasional appearances in various Marvel titles, against such superheroes as Spider-Man.

Bob Layton, writer of the first five issues of X-Factor, intended for Owl to be the Alliance of Evil's master. After Layton was removed from the book and replaced with Louise Simonson, Owl was replaced with the newly created character Apocalypse, as Simonson and editor Bob Harras wanted a new villain for the book.

== Fictional character biography ==
Leland Owlsley was once a successful financier and financial investor, nicknamed "The Owl of Wall Street" for his financial acumen, until his tax evasion and crooked business deals were exposed by the Internal Revenue Service (IRS). Rather than fight the charges, he fled to a hideout across the Hudson River and pursued a new career as a crime lord. Owl had already been pooling a percentage of his earnings into researching superpowered enhancements; the result was a serum that enhanced his physical prowess and gave him the ability to glide. He subsequently employed two enforcers and captured Daredevil in a chance encounter, planning to kill him at a meeting of underworld bosses in order to make himself the undisputed overlord of crime. However, Daredevil escaped and confronted Owl in battle. Eventually determining that he could not defeat Daredevil unarmed and alone, he fled, escaping his foe in the river. When he came to shore, Owl was captured by police, convicted, and sentenced to prison by Judge Lewis.

Following an escape, Owl established a new hideout on a volcanic isle and kidnapped Judge Lewis and Matt Murdock (Daredevil's alter ego), forcing them to participate in a sham trial with Murdock forced to defend Lewis. With a clever distraction, the lawyer was able to change into Daredevil. Owl's second confrontation with his nemesis ended in a draw, and both were forced to flee the erupting island. He was later freed from prison by Mr. Kline, who ordered him to capture Daredevil. Learning from their previous encounters, Owl finally overcame Daredevil and sent him plummeting to his death. However, the vigilante was saved by Black Widow, and the two of them worked together to thwart Owl's planned heist of the San Francisco public treasury.

Owl was later stricken with a debilitating ailment resulting in the paralysis of his legs. Owl is fitted with a neurological pacemaker to cure his ailment. He battles Daredevil and Spider-Man and is incapacitated when his pacemaker short-circuits. Owl is confined to a life-support module designed by the Maggia. He schemed to loot New York under cover of a citywide blackout, but was captured by Spider-Man, the Black Widow, and Simon Stroud. No longer confined to the module, Owl later engages in a gang war against Doctor Octopus in an attempt to usurp Kingpin's position as the crime boss of New York's underworld.

Owl started to re-establish his presence in the criminal underworld in the absence of Kingpin. When Spider-Man visits him regarding information about the kidnapping of May Parker, Owl says that Electro and the Vulture kidnapped her. This turns out to be a ploy by Owl, who is after the two villains for stealing from him. Owl begins to enlarge his criminal empire by refining Mutant Growth Hormone from his own genetic material, though Daredevil was able to get him arrested.

He managed to manipulate behind the scenes and get the Kingpin arrested for a past murder when it looked like Fisk was going to make a deal with the FBI. The deal in question involved Matt Murdock being arrested for being Daredevil. When Foggy Nelson, representing Murdock in court, visited him in jail, he was apparently killed by the other prisoners. Owl later taunted Murdock about this, and Murdock, who had become unhinged due to his friend's death, brutally beat Owl. Unbeknownst to the two of them, Nelson was alive and in witness protection.

The Sinister Six (consisting of Boomerang, Overdrive, Shocker, Speed Demon, and Beetle) assaulted Owl's base. Overdrive and Speed Demon were captured by Owl and interrogated. Beetle tried to blackmail Owl into releasing them while covertly dialing for backup. Unimpressed, Owl got ready to execute her when Tombstone arrives.

After a series of failures, Boomerang teams up with Owl and forms the Sinister Sixteen to retrieve the picture of Doctor Doom that the former had stolen a few days before, and that was now in the hands of the Chameleon. The line-up consisted of the dregs of the underworld, who Boomerang used as cannon fodder to retrieve the painting.

During the "Gang War" storyline, Elektra is visited by Owl, who states that several crime lords are vying for control over New York City. Owl later visits Madame Masque, informing her that he hedged the heroes as she instructed. Owl is attacked by Bellona and imprisoned alongside Count Nefaria, Hammerhead, and Silvermane. Masque places Owl under mind control and forces him to battle Spider-Man.

== Powers and abilities ==
Owl ingested a special serum which enables him to naturally glide for short distances and perform complex midair maneuvers. Owl's gliding ability is assisted by a weak psionic ability to levitate his body. Under the right conditions, such as favorable air currents, Owl can glide for at least the length of a city block.

Owl's bones are hollow, and he possesses a greater proportionate muscle mass than normal humans. His strength, durability, speed, agility, vision, and hearing are all enhanced, and he can rotate his head 180 degrees, similar to a real owl. His teeth and nails are sharp and can tear through flesh with relative ease.

Owl wears a set of steel talons attached to each forearm and a specially designed cape resembling an owl's wings to assist him in steering during flight. He often uses various other bird-themed weapons and pieces of equipment.

== Other versions ==
=== Age of Apocalypse ===
An alternate timeline version of Owl appears in Age of Apocalypse. This version is a member of Apocalypse's Marauders who is later killed by Gwen Stacy and Clint Barton.

=== Age of Ultron ===
An alternate universe version of Owl makes a minor appearance in Age of Ultron #1.

=== Marvel Zombies ===
An alternate universe version of Owl makes a minor appearance in Marvel Zombies vs. The Army of Darkness #2 as a servant of the Kingpin who is killed by the Punisher.

== In other media ==
=== Television ===
- Owl makes a non-speaking cameo appearance in the Spider-Man: The Animated Series episode "The Insidious Six" as a crime lord and associate of Silvermane's.
- Leland Owlsley appears in the first season of Daredevil, portrayed by Bob Gunton. This version is a crooked human accountant for the firm Silver & Brent who manages Wilson Fisk's finances and has a son named Lee Owlsley. After Fisk falls in love with Vanessa Marianna, Owlsley conspires with triad boss Madame Gao to kill her, believing Marianna is a bad influence on Fisk. However, Gao is forced to leave town due to Matt Murdock dismantling her heroin ring. Owlsley attempts to blackmail Fisk into letting him take over Gao's operation, but reveals his failed attempt on Marianna's life, causing an enraged Fisk to throw Owlsley into an elevator shaft to his death.

=== Video games ===
Owl appears as a mini-boss in Spider-Man (1995).
