= Janice Lincoln =

Supervillainess appearing in Marvel Comics

- Janice Lincoln / Beetle.

Publication information
- Publisher: Marvel Comics
- First appearance: Captain America #607 (August 2010)
- Created by: Ed Brubaker; Jackson Guice

In-story information
- Alter ego: Janice Lincoln
- Species: Human
- Team affiliations: Sinister Syndicate; Sinister Six
- Notable aliases: Lady Beetle; Beetle
- Abilities: Powered armor granting: Superhuman strength and durability; Variety of weapon systems; Flight via artificial wings; Ability to stick to walls

Janice Lincoln is a supervillain appearing in American comic books published by Marvel Comics. Created by writer Ed Brubaker and artist Jackson Guice, the character first appeared in Captain America #607 (August 2010). Janice Lincoln is the daughter of supervillain Tombstone. She is a recurring antagonist of the superhero Spider-Man. The character has also been known as Beetle and Lady Beetle at various points in her history.

== Publication history ==
Janice Lincoln debuted in Captain America #607 (August 2010), created by writer Ed Brubaker and artist Jackson Guice. She appeared in the 2013 The Superior Foes of Spider-Man series. She appeared in the 2018 The Amazing Spider-Man series.

== Fictional character biography ==
Janice Lincoln is the daughter of the supervillain Tombstone. Her mother was an ex-girlfriend of Tombstone during his early days in organized crime. Janice grew up with her father showing up sporadically, usually to help out with bills and schooling. Janice idolized her father and his criminal activities, however, she was forbidden to take part in them.

After building a successful career as a defense attorney, Janice is appointed to defend Helmut Zemo, at which point she volunteered to work for him as the new Beetle. Janice's armor was also revealed to have been built by the Fixer. Zemo and Fixer provided Janice with the Beetle armor and a nano-virus as part of their plan to destroy Captain America (Bucky Barnes). She emerges from the rubble of an explosion she causes to confront Captain America and Black Widow. The new Beetle fights Bucky and Black Widow in a short battle and is defeated. Bucky unmasks her, and realizes she is culpable in using the nano-virus on him. She is imprisoned in the Raft, where she reveals that she knows Captain America and Bucky are one and the same. While Janice resists Bucky and Black Widow's attempts to interrogate her for the identity of her employer, Fixer asks Zemo whether they should punish her for her failure. Zemo is merciful, saying that she knows no information that would hurt them. Janice is left to her own devices, and the heroes deduce Zemo's identity. However, Zemo still exposes Captain America's identity to the public.

As part of the Marvel NOW! publishing line, Beetle joins Boomerang's Sinister Six. After being defeated by Superior Spider-Man (Otto Octavius's mind in Peter Parker's body), Boomerang is secretly contracted by Chameleon to recover Silvermane's head from Owl. To this end, Boomerang deceives the team into agreeing to help him. However, after the original Beetle, the reformed Abner Jenkins, is assigned to be Boomerang's parole officer, the team vote him out and Janice as their new team leader. Speed Demon's vote is motivated by his unrequited attraction for her. The others note that the Beetle becomes more despotic as team leader, but attribute this as a reaction to the pressure to succeed and avoid incarceration. Boomerang secretly notifies Power Man and Iron Fist of the Sinister Six's whereabouts. Janice and her associates are arrested, but Boomerang frees them in transit to jail and decides to reclaim his leadership role.

Janice appears at Stark Industries after the events of The Superior Foes of Spider-Man, claiming to have reformed, and applying for the open Head of Security position alongside Prodigy, Victor Mancha, and Scott Lang. After seducing Iron Man, Janice tries to assassinate him at the behest of an unidentified client, but she is disarmed by Lang, and pursued and presumably apprehended by Iron Man.

Janice Lincoln meets Electro (Francine Frye) where she states that she is offering her membership. Janice learned how Francine got her powers as Janice tells her that she is Tombstone's daughter. Janice states that they are building an organization that values and respects the female contributions to the side of evil. Janice introduces Francine to the rest of the Sinister Syndicate, consisting of Lady Octopus, Scorpia, Trapstr, and White Rabbit.

Janice also began to date Randy Robertson. There was tension between their respective fathers due to their tumultuous history with each other, but Tombstone and Robbie eventually accepted it. Janice and Randy eventually tried to get married, but the reception was interrupted by Shotgun, who shoots Tombstone and sends him to the hospital. During the "Gang War" storyline, Beetle and the Sinister Syndicate battle the other gangs of New York for control of territory. Following Madame Masque's defeat, Tombstone attempts to murder Spider-Man to cement his control over the city, but is arrested. After Janice testifies against him, Tombstone escapes and attempts to kill Janice, but Spider-Man stops him and helps Beetle leave New York City.

== Powers and abilities ==
Janice Lincoln possesses a Beetle suit that grants her superhuman strength, durability, and the ability to fly and stick to walls. Her armor seems to be loosely based on the armor designed by the Tinkerer for Abe Jenkins after his original Beetle armor was destroyed by Iron Man. However, the Zemo/Fixer costume does not seem to have the electro-byte offensive capability or the internal battle computer of Jenkins' suit. In her initial appearance, she uses military-grade weaponry to ambush Bucky and the Black Widow.

== Reception ==
=== Critical response ===
Brandon Zachary of Comic Book Resources included Janice Lincoln in their "Spider-Man: The Best New Villains of the Century" list, saying, "A surprisingly pragmatic but ambitious character, Beetle is the most charming new Spider-Man villain in years." Seth Rector of Screen Rant asserted, "Beetle has developed a fanbase that was spawned by the series Superior Foes of Spider-Man. Though she doesn't yet have a motivation to turn good, she certainly has the charisma and resolve that it takes to make it in the superhero community."

Screen Rant included Janice Lincoln in their "Spider-Man: 10 Best Female Villains" list, and in their "10 Best Marvel Legacy Villains Who Lived Up To Their Predecessor" list. Comic Book Resources ranked Janice Lincoln 2nd in their "Marvel: 10 Famous Villains From The 2000s To Bring Back" list, 5th in their "10 Greatest Gender-Flipped Marvel Villains" list, 7th in their "10 Most Powerful Members of the Sinister Syndicate" list, 8th in their "10 Most Powerful Lawyers In Marvel Comics" list.

== In other media ==
Janice Lincoln / Beetle appears as a boss in Marvel: Avengers Alliance.
