= Sinister Syndicate =

Comic book supervillain group

Publication information
- Publisher: Marvel Comics
- First appearance: The Amazing Spider-Man #280 (September 1986)
- Created by: Tom DeFalco; Ron Frenz

In-story information
- Base(s): New York
- Member(s): See Membership

The Sinister Syndicate is a group of supervillains appearing in American comic books published by Marvel Comics. The characters serve as a collection of lesser-known Spider-Man villains. The group was the focus of the 1991 Deadly Foes of Spider-Man mini-series.

== Publication history ==
The Sinister Syndicate first appeared in The Amazing Spider-Man #280 and was created by Tom DeFalco and Ron Frenz.

== Fictional team history ==
=== First version ===
Patterned after the conglomeration of Spider-Man's deadliest foes who call themselves the Sinister Six, the Sinister Syndicate was founded by Beetle and originally consisted of Hydro-Man, Rhino, Boomerang, and Speed Demon. Unlike the Sinister Six, which was formed mainly to destroy Spider-Man, the Syndicate primarily work as mercenaries. The Sinister Syndicate's first mission has them successfully preventing Spider-Man and Silver Sable from capturing Jason Macendale, then known as Jack O'Lantern.

=== Second version ===
The group, now featuring Boomerang's girlfriend Leila Davis, are the focus of the 1991 miniseries Deadly Foes of Spider-Man. The four-issue mini-series focuses on the group breaking up due to Beetle's jealousy towards Boomerang and his attempts to usurp control over the group. Beetle eventually betrays Boomerang by allowing him to be caught during a robbery and then convincing him to use Beetle's lawyer Steve Partridge, not knowing that Beetle had instructed Partridge to throw the trial to ensure Boomerang's conviction.

Leila betrays Speed Demon and reveals her true purpose for dating Boomerang and involving herself with the Syndicate: Leila was the widow of the supervillain Ringer. The Ringer had been kidnapped years earlier by Beetle, who then strapped a fake bomb to his chest, forcing him to fight Spider-Man. When Spider-Man defeated the Ringer and exposed Beetle's scheme, Ringer was humiliated and branded a loser by his fellow villains, culminating in his being killed by the Scourge of the Underworld. Leila sought to destroy Beetle in order to avenge her husband.

A massive showdown ensues between the members, with Hydro-Man and Speed Demon allying with Beetle and Boomerang and Rhino allying with Leila. When Beetle throws a car at Leila, she is saved by Spider-Man, who prevents her from shooting Beetle. Beetle is imprisoned, while the other members of the Sinister Syndicate escape.

=== Third version ===
As Hardshell, Leila Davis assembles Boomerang, Rhino, and Vulture to form a new Sinister Syndicate. Vulture plans to steal the Nuclear Blaster to cure himself of cancer, while Boomerang and Rhino want to sell the weapon to A.I.M. Before they can make their decisions, Beetle and Stegron raid their hideout and capture Spider-Man, intending to trade him for the Nuclear Blaster. Hardshell does not want the Nuclear Blasters given to Beetle and Stegron. This results in a two-way battle as Hardshell is observed by someone named Strikeback. As the two-way battle between the Sinister Syndicate, Beetle, and Stegron continues, Leila learns that Strikeback is actually Ringer, who was resurrected as a cyborg by A.I.M. The battle ends with Boomerang, Rhino, and Vulture being incapacitated alongside Beetle and Stegron.

=== Unofficial versions ===
Komodo and the Sinister Syndicate fighting Spider-Man. Art by Jim Cheung.

In Avengers: The Initiative, half of the Syndicate (Hydro-Man, Shocker, and Boomerang) reunite and fight Spider-Man. The battle is interrupted by Komodo and War Machine. They are later apprehended by the Initiative's Scarlet Spiders.

Some members of the Sinister Syndicate are reunited in the 2013 ongoing series Superior Foes of Spider-Man. Boomerang is the leader of the new "Sinister Six", which includes Shocker, Overdrive, Speed Demon, and a new female Beetle (Janice Lincoln). As Beetle points out, the new group only has five members due to the Superior Spider (Doctor Octopus' mind in Peter Parker's body) reprogramming Living Brain to serve him, but Boomerang insists on keeping the "Sinister Six" name.

=== Fourth version ===
Operatives of Wilson Fisk free Electro (Francine Frye) so that she can be part of a female version of the Sinister Syndicate. Electro meets with Beetle, who states that she is building an organization that values and respects the female contributions to the side of evil. Beetle states that they had a teleconference with Black Mariah from prison and are trying to make contact with Morgan le Fay. Beetle then proceeds to introduce Electro to the rest of the team, consisting of Lady Octopus, Scorpia, Trapstr, and White Rabbit.

The Sinister Syndicate are sent to capture Boomerang. Spider-Man defends Boomerang, but accidentally sets off his gaserang, knocking out Spider-Man and allowing the Syndicate to make off with Boomerang. After some time with Randy Robertson, Beetle sends Wilson Fisk the coordinates to Boomerang's location and goes to meet up with the Syndicate. As they plan to adjourn for the night, they hear Fisk outside stating that they are harboring a criminal and must surrender Boomerang to him. The Syndicate then assists Spider-Man against Fisk's forces while Spider-Man evacuates Boomerang to safety. The Syndicate is defeated and arrested, but are freed by an unknown assailant while being transported to prison.

During the "Sinister War" storyline, the Sinister Syndicate is discussing adding Ana Kravinoff to their ranks. Scorpia objects to this as Beetle states to her that they are not the Sinister Six. The group and Ana are then abducted by Kindred, who offers them and the other villains the opportunity to take down Spider-Man and punish him for his sins. With Ana officially their latest member, the Sinister Syndicate intercept Overdrive, who was carrying Spider-Man away from Foreigner's group.

During the "Gang War" storyline, Beetle, Lady Octopus, Scorpia, and Trapstr come to the aid of White Rabbit and her henchman Kareem when they are attacked by Black Mariah. The next day, the Sinister Syndicate, Digger, and their allies confront the Maggia. Tombstone has White Rabbit send word to have the Sinister Syndicate and those on Beetle's side to pull out of Central Park. Following the end of the gang war, Beetle leaves New York City.

=== Fifth version ===
The Life Foundation formed their own Sinister Syndicate, recruiting the symbiotes Scream, Phage, Lasher, Riot, and Agony.

== Membership ==
=== First Sinister Syndicate ===
- Beetle (leader)
- Boomerang
- Hydro-Man
- Rhino
- Speed Demon

=== Second Sinister Syndicate ===
- Beetle (leader)
- Boomerang
- Hydro-Man
- Rhino
- Speed Demon
- Hardshell (driver)
- Shocker

=== Third Sinister Syndicate ===
- Leila Davis (leader)
- Boomerang
- Rhino
- Vulture

=== Fourth Sinister Syndicate ===
- Beetle (leader)
- Digger
- Electro (Francine Frye)
- Kraven the Hunter (Ana Kravinoff)
- Lady Octopus
- Scorpia
- Trapster
- White Rabbit

=== Fifth Sinister Syndicate ===
- Scream
- Phage
- Lasher
- Riot
- Agony

== In other media ==
- The Sinister Syndicate appears in Marvel Super Hero Squad Online, consisting of Doctor Octopus, Green Goblin, Lizard, Mysterio, and Venom.
- The Sinister Syndicate appears in The Amazing Adventures of Spider-Man, consisting of Doctor Octopus, Electro, Scream, Hydro-Man, and Hobgoblin.
- The "Sinister Syndicate" appears in the Marvel Vs. System and HeroClix games as a generic affiliation of several Spider-Man villains.
