= Frightful Four =

Group of fictional characters in Marvel Comics

- The Frightful Four (clockwise from right: Wizard, Titania, Trapster, and Hydro-Man), standing victorious over Human Torch, The Thing, and Storm. Art by Michael Turner.

Publication information
- Publisher: Marvel Comics
- First appearance: Fantastic Four #36 (March 1965)
- Created by: Stan Lee; Jack Kirby

In-story information
- Base(s): Various
- Member(s): Hydro-Man; Klaw; Medusa; Sandman; Thundra; Titania; Trapster; Wizard; Dragon Man; Brute (Reed Richards); Electro; Llyra; Red Ghost

The Frightful Four are a group of fictional characters appearing in American comic books published by Marvel Comics. They serve as the antithesis to the Fantastic Four.

== Publication history ==
The Frightful Four first appeared in Fantastic Four #36 (March 1965), and were created by Stan Lee and Jack Kirby.

The team subsequently appears in Fantastic Four #94 (January 1970), #129 (December 1972), #148 (July 1974), #177 (December 1976), Peter Parker, the Spectacular Spider-Man #42 (May 1980), The Amazing Spider-Man #214-215 (March–April 1981), Fantastic Four #326-328 (May–July 1989), Fantastic Four Unlimited #5 (March 1994), The Incredible Hulk vol. 2 #418 (June 1994), Deadpool vol. 3 #35 (December 1999), Fantastic Four vol. 3 #29 (May 2000), and Fantastic Four #514 (August 2004), and #547-549, and Superior Carnage #1-5 (2014).

The Frightful Four received an entry in The Official Handbook of the Marvel Universe Update '89 #3.

== Fictional team biography ==
The Frightful Four first appears in Fantastic Four #36, consisting of Wizard, Sandman, Paste-Pot Pete (later called Trapster), and an amnesiac Medusa. The villains are originally fairly successful, almost defeating the Fantastic Four during Susan Storm and Reed Richards's engagement party in their first appearance. They capture all the members except the Human Torch, who frees the others.

Wizard uses a hypnosis device on the Thing to enslave him at Medusa's request. When the Fantastic Four attempt to rescue the Thing, they are overcome by the Frightful Four and captured. Human Torch and Invisible Woman manage to free themselves from their respective traps and counterattack the Frightful Four, allowing Mister Fantastic to free himself. However, the Human Torch is recaptured and brainwashed. The Frightful Four incapacitate the Human Torch, but learn that he had been pretending to be mind-controlled. Meanwhile, Mister Fantastic tries to use a device to reverse the brainwashing on Thing. However, Thing tries to destroy the machine to escape, causing an explosion that exposes him to a near-lethal dose of radiation. Although it worked and Thing is freed of the brainwashing, he is placed in a bed to examine the radiation's potential effects on him. The Frightful Four return to the Baxter Building and attack Mister Fantastic and Invisible Woman, showing them that they have taken Human Torch hostage. However, Thing revives just long enough to crush Wizard's body armor, giving Human Torch the chance to free himself from the gigantic anti-gravity disc he is tied to. The Fantastic Four defeat the Frightful Four and capture Wizard, Trapster, and Sandman while Medusa escapes.

After Medusa regains her memories, she leaves the Frightful Four, with Thundra taking her place. The Frightful Four capture the Fantastic Four and hold an audition to find a permanent member, with Texas Twister and Captain Ultra unsuccessfully auditioning. When Tigra arrives and frees the Fantastic Four, Wizard announces that whoever can defeat them can join the Frightful Four. Out of the villains that left, only Brute remains. Brute joins the Frightful Four and assists them in fighting the Fantastic Four.

Wizard later assembled Hydro-Man, Titania, and Klaw as the Frightful Four when attacking the Four Freedoms Plaza following Sandman's reform. During the battle, Thing regresses to his human form. The Frightful Four manage to take down the other members of the Fantastic Four as Klaw was defeated. When Dragon Man is brought in as Klaw's replacement, Thing rescues his teammates and stops the Frightful Four.

When the Fantastic Four's reputation was damaged by their attempted coup of Latveria to destroy Doctor Doom's arsenal, the Wizard assembles a new team consisting of himself, the Trapster, Hydro-Man (who now wears a costume made from the same material has Human Torch's costume), and his ex-wife Salamandra, seeking to take advantage of the team's current poor standing by defeating them on a live broadcast. With the aid of the Wizard and Salamandra's daughter Cole, the Frightful Four are defeated when Cole helps the Fantastic Four find her father's base.

Another version of the Frightful Four (consisting of Wizard, Hydro-Man, Titania, and Trapster) appears to challenge the Fantastic Four again, only to find themselves dealing with the additional presence of Black Panther and Storm, who had temporarily joined the Fantastic Four while Mister Fantastic and Invisible Woman were on a second honeymoon to work on their marriage after their separation during the "Civil War".

Wizard begins developing dementia due to punishment inflicted by Black Bolt, so he decides to create a new Frightful Four with Klaw, Karl Malus, and Carnage. He attempts to control Cletus Kasady's mind, but is unable to. He instead transfers his blood into Malus, transforming him into Superior Carnage. Wizard intends to take over NYC City Hall and impress his son, but is stopped by Superior Spider-Man.

Under the orders of a mysterious benefactor, Wizard forms another incarnation of the Frightful Four consisting of Wrecker, Thunderball, and Bulldozer. During a fight with the Fantastic Four, the Frightful Four demonstrated increased powers with which they almost defeat the heroes until the Future Foundation replacement team led by Ant-Man arrives to help them. As the Frightful Four are being taken into S.H.I.E.L.D. custody, Wizard revealed that the attack had been financed by a bigger enemy, and that they did their part.

Wizard is later freed by the same individual who financed his attack and is given more resources to reform the Frightful Four. Using Gazelle, Reptilla, and Vertigo of Salem's Seven, Wizard attacks Chicago to get the attention of Mister Fantastic. Mister Fantastic is almost defeated by the Frightful Four until Scarlet Witch appears to help him. After witnessing the scale of the Quiet Man's plans for revenge coupled with the "betrayal" of his clone Bentley 23, Wizard leads the new Frightful Four of She-Thing, Thundra and Sandman against the Quiet Man's invasion, concluding that this was not a world he wanted for his "son".

After Deadpool failed to deliver Dracula's bride Shiklah in time, Dracula creates a new Frightful Four consisting of Brood mercenary Xzax, Marcus the Centaur, N'Kantu, the Living Mummy, and Frankenstein's Monster. Except for Frankenstein's Monster, the entire team is apparently killed by Deadpool.

== Membership ==
First appearing in Fantastic Four #36, and led by the Wizard, the team was put together to fight against the Fantastic Four.

Character	Real Name	Joined In	Notes
Known members
Wizard	Born Bentley Wittman; legally changed to Wizard	Fantastic Four #36	The founder and leader of the team. Only member who has been a member of every incarnation of the team.
Sandman	William Baker a.k.a. Flint Marko	Fantastic Four #36	Has also been a member of the Sinister Twelve, Sinister Six, Outlaws, an Avengers reservist, and the Wild Pack.
Trapster (formerly Paste-Pot Pete)	Peter Petruski	Fantastic Four #36	Has also been a member of the Lethal Legion and Sinister Six.
Medusa	Medusalith Amaquelin Boltagon	Fantastic Four #36	Inhumans, a Queen of Attilan, wife of Black Bolt; was suffering from amnesia during her membership.
Thundra		Fantastic Four #129	A warrior woman and time traveler from the 23rd century. Has also been a member of the Grapplers. Some time later, mole of the Fantastic Four.
Constrictor	Frank Payne	Deadpool vol. 3 #35	The test team member. Has also been a member of the Sinister Syndicate, Six-Pack, Masters of Evil, S.H.I.E.L.D. and The Initiative.
Deadpool	Wade T. Wilson	Deadpool vol. 3 #35	A human (mutate), mercenary and assassin. The test team member. Has also been a member of the Six Pack, Weapon X, Heroes for Hire, Great Lakes Initiative, Maggia, and Agency X. He is currently a member of Thunderbolts
Taskmaster	Anthony "Tony" Masters	Deadpool vol. 3 #35	The test team member. He will work for nearly anyone for the right price. Has also been a member of the Thunderbolts, Agency X. and the Fifty State Initiative.
Brute	Reed Richards	Fantastic Four #177	An alternate version of Mister Fantastic from Counter-Earth.
Electro	Max Dillon	The Spectacular Spider-Man #42	Has also been a member of the Sinister Twelve, Sinister Six, Emissaries of Evil, and Exterminators.
Llyra	Llyra Morris	The Amazing Spider-Man #214	Mother of Llyron, a member of the water-breathing Homo mermanus who dwell in Lemuria, and Rhonda Morris, a surface woman who inherited her father's oceanarium in Hawaii.
Hydro-Man	Morris Bench	Fantastic Four #326	Has also been a member of the Sinister Twelve, Masters of Evil, and Sinister Syndicate.
Titania	Mary "Skeeter" MacPherran-Creel	Fantastic Four #326	Has also been a member of the Masters of Evil.
Klaw	Ulysses Klaw	Fantastic Four #326	Black Panther's enemy. Has also been a member of the Masters of Evil and Fearsome Foursome.
Dragon Man		Fantastic Four #328	A dragon-like android created by Gregson Gilbert. Has also been a member of the New Enforcers.
Absorbing Man	Carl "Crusher" Creel	Incredible Hulk vol. 2 #418	An unofficial team member. Husband of Titania. Has also been a member of the Masters of Evil.
Living Laser	Arthur Parks	Incredible Hulk vol. 2 #418	An unofficial team member. Has also been a member of the Mandarin's Minions, Batroc's Brigade, the Lethal Legion, and MODOK's 11.
Mister Hyde	Calvin Zabo	Incredible Hulk vol. 2 #418	An unofficial team member. Father of Daisy Johnson. Has also been a member of the Masters of Evil.
She-Thing	Sharon Ventura	Fantastic Four Unlimited #5	Also known as Ms. Marvel. Has also been a member of the Thunderiders and Fantastic Four. Former girlfriend of the Thing.
Red Ghost	Ivan Kragoff	Fantastic Four Unlimited #5	A Soviet scientist who assembled a crew of three primates named Mikhlo the gorilla, Igor the baboon, and Peotr the orangutan to form the Super-Apes.
Dreadknight	Bram Velsing	Spider-Man: Chaos in Calgary #4	When the criminal Black Knight died fighting Iron Man, Dreadknight was likely meant as a new/legacy version of the villain.
Man-Bull	William Taurens	Spider-Man: Chaos in Calgary #4	Has also been a member of the Death Squad.
Blastaar		Fantastic Four: World's Greatest Comics Magazine #10	A member of an alien race of the planet Baluur in the Negative Zone. Enemy of Annihilus, another Fantastic Four villain.
Punisher		Fantastic Four vol. 3 #29	A cyborg created by Galactus.
Cole		Fantastic Four #514	A daughter of Wizard and Salamandra. Current whereabouts are unknown.
Salamandra		Fantastic Four #514	Mother of Cole. Former wife of Wizard.
Lyra		Hulk vol. 2 #19	Hailing from Earth-8009, Lyra is the genetically engineered daughter of Thundra and the Hulk of Earth-616. Has also been a member of A.R.M.O.R.
Beetle	Abner Jenkins	The Amazing Spider-Man #657	Beetle was seen in a flashback as a member of the Frightful Four when they ambushed Spider-Man and Human Torch.
Karl Malus		Superior Carnage #2	Recruited to help Wizard gain control of the symbiote Carnage, Malus soon finds himself forcibly made into Carnage's new host.
Wrecker	Dirk Garthwaite	Fantastic Four vol. 5 #3	Also leader of the Wrecking Crew.
Thunderball	Eliot Franklin	Fantastic Four vol. 5 #3	Also a member of the Wrecking Crew.
Bulldozer	Marci Camp	Fantastic Four vol. 5 #3	Daughter of the original Bulldozer.
Gazelle		Fantastic Four vol. 5 #10	Also a member of the Salem's Seven.
Reptilla		Fantastic Four vol. 5 #10	Also a member of the Salem's Seven.
Vertigo		Fantastic Four vol. 5 #10	Also a member of the Salem's Seven.
N'Kantu, the Living Mummy	N'Kantu	Deadpool: the Gauntlet Infinite Comic #8	This is the first time the Wizard was not a member. The team was referred to as The New Frightful Four and were formed by Dracula.
Marcus the Centaur	Marcus	Deadpool: the Gauntlet Infinite Comic #8	This is the first time the Wizard was not a member. The team was referred to as The New Frightful Four and were formed by Dracula.
Xzax		Deadpool: the Gauntlet Infinite Comic #8	This is the first time the Wizard was not a member. The team was referred to as The New Frightful Four and were formed by Dracula.
Frankenstein's Monster	None	Deadpool: the Gauntlet Infinite Comic #8	This is the first time the Wizard was not a member. The team was referred to as The New Frightful Four and were formed by Dracula.

=== Wannabes ===
The wannabes were a group of superhumans who gathered in response to an advertisement to join the team.

- Captain Ultra
- Osprey
- Texas Twister

== Other versions ==
=== Earth-98 ===
An alternate universe iteration of the Frightful Four from Earth-98 appears in Fantastic Four Annual (1998), consisting of the Wizard, Blastaar, Quicksand, and the Hooded Haunt.

=== Marvel 1602 ===
An alternate universe iteration of the Frightful Four from Earth-311 called the Four Who Are Frightful appear in Marvel 1602: Fantastick Four, consisting of Jacobean variants of the Wizard, Medusa, the Sandman, and the Trapster.

=== Marvel Adventures ===
An alternate universe iteration of the Frightful Four appear in Marvel Adventures Fantastic Four #25, consisting of Reed Richards / Mr. Devious, Susan Storm / the Unstoppable Woman, Ben Grimm / Monsterman, and Johnny Storm / the Human Pyre. This version of the group are evil, paranoid counterparts of the Fantastic Four who blame non-existent enemies for the accident that transformed them, seek revenge on the world, and are opposed by Victor von Doom / Doc Iron.

=== Ultimate Marvel ===
Zombified alternate universe versions of the Fantastic Four, renamed the Frightful Four, from the Marvel Zombies universe appear in the Ultimate Marvel imprint. They travel from their native universe to Earth-1610 to spread their zombie virus to it, only to be captured by its version of Mister Fantastic. The Frightful Four escape in an attempt to bring more zombies from their universe to Earth-1610. However, Mister Fantastic uses Doctor Doom's body and magic to kill them.

=== What If? ===
An alternate universe iteration of the Frightful Four appear in What If This was the Fantastic Four?, consisting of the Sandman, Venom, Sabretooth, and the Abomination. This version of the group was formed by Doctor Doom and empowered by Mephisto with demonic energy to combat Spider-Man, Wolverine, the Ghost Rider, and the Hulk, though the energy would later kill the Frightful Four.

== In other media ==
- The Frightful Four appears in a self-titled episode of The New Fantastic Four, consisting of Wizard, Trapster, Medusa, and Sandman.
- The Frightful Four appears in the Fantastic Four episode "And the Wind Cries Medusa", consisting of Wizard, Trapster, Medusa, and Hydro-Man.
- The Frightful Four appears in the Fantastic Four: World's Greatest Heroes episode "Frightful", consisting of Wizard, Trapster, Klaw, and Dragon Man.
- The Frightful Four appears in Ultimate Spider-Man, consisting of Wizard, Klaw, Thundra, and Trapster.
