= Trapster =

Marvel Comics fictional character

Peter Petruski Trapster
- Trapster as seen in the Official Handbook of the Marvel Universe (vol. 2) #13.

Publication information
- Publisher: Marvel Comics
- First appearance: As Paste-Pot Pete: Strange Tales #104 (January 1963); As Trapster: Fantastic Four #38 (May 1965)
- Created by: Stan Lee (writer); Jack Kirby (artist)

In-story information
- Alter ego: Peter Petruski
- Species: Human
- Team affiliations: Frightful Four; Lethal Legion; Frightful Five; Intelligencia; Sinister Six; Maggia
- Partnerships: Zodiac
- Notable aliases: Paste-Pot Pete; Trapster; Willie
- Abilities: Suit granting: Adhesive or lubricant projection; Use of trap devices; Wall-crawling; Genius-level intellect

Peter Petruski is a character appearing in American comic books published by Marvel Comics. Created by writer Stan Lee and artist Jack Kirby, the character first appeared in Strange Tales #104 (January 1963). Petruski was among the early supervillains introduced during Marvel Comics' Silver Age and is best known by the codenames Paste-Pot Pete and Trapster. A former research chemist based in New York City, Petruski invented an extremely adhesive "multi-polymer" compound, which he employed in a paste gun to pursue a criminal career. Over the course of his publication history, he has been affiliated with several villainous groups, including the Intelligencia and the Frightful Four.

== Publication history ==
Peter Petruski debuted as Paste-Pot Pete in Strange Tales #104 (January 1963), created by Stan Lee and Jack Kirby. He first appeared as the Trapster in Fantastic Four #38 (May 1965). He subsequently appeared in several Marvel series, including Daredevil (2016) and Fantastic Four (2023).

== Fictional character biography ==
Peter Petruski was born in Gary, Indiana. Originally calling himself Paste-Pot Pete, he clashed with the Human Torch during his efforts to sell a new American missile to the Soviets. However, Pete escaped by using his paste to catch the wing of a plane, then diving into the sea.

Following a failed solo effort against Human Torch, Paste-Pot Pete broke out of jail and teamed with the Wizard in efforts to trump his youthful foe. However, Pete was angered over Wizard acting as the team's leader. Wizard framed Human Torch for a robbery. They got Human Torch to Wizard's house and used compressed air to force him into a chamber of steel mirrors, planning to fill the place with a gas that would cut off the oxygen supply of the Torch. However, Human Torch melted through the paste that held him to the floor, created a flaming duplicate to fool the two, then increased his flame enabling him to burn through the mirrors. The villains only realized this deception when the fake Human Torch faded away due to the gas, by which time Human Torch had regained his flame and captured the two in a flaming ring.

When Baron Zemo trapped the Avengers with Adhesive X, Pete provided them with a solvent of his own formulation to dissolve it and was paroled from prison. He adopted a new costume and weaponry, and battled Human Torch and the Thing using new paste types. He captured Thing, then Human Torch, but was still defeated. Wizard and Pete would eventually team with the criminal Sandman and the Inhuman Medusa as the Frightful Four to battle the Fantastic Four. It was shortly after the formation of the Frightful Four that Pete abandoned his old alias and assumed the more intimidating name Trapster after Spider-Man found the Paste-Pot Pete name laughable. The Frightful Four would clash time and again with the Fantastic Four, often enjoying some measure of success in their efforts. Over the years, the membership of the Frightful Four would vary, but Trapster served in virtually every incarnation in which Wizard served as well, loyal to his longtime boss.

He changed his nom de crime to the Trapster and appeared with new weaponry in Fantastic Four #38, with the second appearance of the Frightful Four, in an attempt to make himself sound more formidable. In this encounter, the Frightful Four was able to defeat the Fantastic Four. Over the years, a running gag in Marvel Comics involved heroes and villains alike reminding Trapster of his earlier name of "Paste-Pot Pete" — which would inevitably send him flying into a rage.

Trapster has often sought independent recognition, battling virtually every "street-level" hero in the Marvel Universe either by design or by opposition to some criminal scheme.

Saddened by constant defeats, Trapster seeks out the Tinkerer's aid in redesigning his arsenal. Adding wrist-pumps for his glue weaponry and a bandolier of various explosives and gimmicks, Trapster joins forces with Whirlwind in a bid to defeat Captain America. Despite his improved arsenal, both villains are defeated.

Trapster defeats Spider-Man in one-on-one combat after being enlisted to battle him during the "Acts of Vengeance" storyline. When the Trapster learns that Spider-Man has survived and returns to finish the job, he is overwhelmed by Spider-Man's newly acquired cosmic powers (eventually revealed to be a manifestation of the Uni-Power).

During the Secret War storyline, Trapster is enlisted by Lucia von Bardas, the former prime minister of Latveria, and placed in her secret army of technology-based villains. Von Bardas sends the army against Wolverine, Spider-Man, Luke Cage, Daredevil, and Captain America, the five heroes Nick Fury had sent to Latveria to stop von Bardas. When the battle starts to turn in favor of the heroes, von Bardas converts the armor of her technological army into a bomb. Fury's unknown agent Daisy Johnson defeats von Bardas and the armor army's lives were saved. Trapster escapes in the resulting battle between Fury and Wolverine.

During the Avengers: Standoff! storyline, Trapster appears as an inmate of Pleasant Hill, a gated community established by S.H.I.E.L.D. Using Kobik, S.H.I.E.L.D. transformed Trapster into a mild-mannered Pleasant Hill groundskeeper named Willie. Helmut Zemo and Fixer restore Trapster's memory and he helps to assault a S.H.I.E.L.D. outpost.

== Powers and abilities ==
Peter Petruski does not possess superhuman abilities. Instead, the character relies on a variety of technological devices. He designed a costume of synthetic stretch fabric equipped with storage canisters for adhesives or lubricants, as well as paste-rigged boots and gloves to cling onto surfaces. His primary weapon is a projectile glue, initially delivered by a pistol connected by an armored tubing to the container worn at his hip, then wrist-mounted cannons, and eventually shot straight from the glove tips. Petruski shoots out streams of liquid gel that immediately form into a springy rope, thus enabling Pete to duplicate Spider-Man's webbing (to the point where he is the only person Spider-Man knows who could replicate even an approximate copy of his webs). He was able to create a fire-proof paste. Pete also designed boots that allow him to walk on walls by sequentially releasing a powerful glue followed by lubricant. Trapster created solvents that can render any surface frictionless and discovered a way to dissolve the extremely strong "Adhesive X" concocted by Heinrich Zemo, which even Zemo himself could not do. He also created a dust capable of rendering Mister Fantastic's unstable molecules inert.

Furthermore, Petruski is an expert chemist, a skilled marksman, and talented disguise artist. Pete can also utilize other devices, such as anti-gravity discs, explosive caps, ultrasonic transmitters, a floating platform, and various mechanical traps to bind his opponents.

== Reception ==
Sean Bassett of Screen Rant noted that despite his eccentric and ludicrous nature, Peter Petruski has proven to be extremely popular with fans. Bassett described the character as a surprisingly effective criminal mastermind, one of Marvel Comics' more outlandish creations since his debut in the 1960s. While acknowledging that the character's quirky aspects might not work well in live-action, Bassett said that these traits would be well-suited to the exaggerated style of an animated series. They also highlighted that Paste Pot Pete's signature paste gun would be a natural fit for a cartoon, adding a playful and zany element to Spider-Man's adventures. Jenna Anderson of ComicBook.com asserted that Peter Petruski has become somewhat of a punchline among Marvel fans, largely due to his absurd costume and the bizarre "paste-gun" gimmick. Despite this, the character has had notable moments in his decades-long history, including a crossover with She-Hulk where he was one of several supervillains who sued the Tinkerer. Anderson suggested that the miniseries She-Hulk: Attorney at Law would be an ideal setting to introduce Petruski in the MCU, especially if he were to become involved in the show's legal battles, staying true to his comic book roots.

CM Punk expressed his interest in Peter Petruski. During a Reddit AMA promoting his film Girl on the Third Floor, CM Punk mentioned that while he has always wanted to write a Punisher story, he would also enjoy seeing a show centered around Paste Pot Pete.

== Other characters named Trapster ==
=== Larry Curtiss ===
Lawrence "Larry" Curtiss is a different version of Trapster who appeared in Iron Man Annual #12. Known as "Trapster", he was the assistant head of security for the Roxxon Oil Company and stole Peter Petruski's costume and weapons. He also had heat-seeking mini-missiles equipped with concussion charges and glue missiles (fired from paste-shooters). He used the Trapster's equipment to steal the inventions programs from Iron Man and desired to replace his boss as the head of security at Roxxon. However, he was discovered by his boss and defeated by Iron Man.

=== Female Trapster ===
An unnamed woman used the Trapster's costume and equipment when she joined up with Wizard's Frightful Four. During the fight with the Avengers, Trapster was knocked out by Iron Man.

=== Michelle ===
A third, female incarnation of Trapster is introduced when she interrupts a fight between Spider-Man and Falcon. She steals from Falcon before fleeing.

Trapster later appears as a member of the Sinister Syndicate where she spells her name Trapstr. She states that there is intentionally no E in her codename and that she is considering changing it to Trapstar. The Sinister Syndicate attack the F.E.A.S.T. building that Boomerang is volunteering at and manage to kidnap him. When Wilson Fisk demands that the Sinister Syndicate surrender Boomerang to him, the Syndicate assists Spider-Man in battling Fisk's forces. The Syndicate are subsequently arrested, but are freed after their transport is attacked by an unknown assailant.

During the "Gang War" storyline, Trapstr accompanies Beetle, Lady Octopus, and Scorpia to aid White Rabbit and her henchman Kareem when they are attacked by Black Mariah's gang. Trapstr later accompanies the Sinister Syndicate and those on Beetle's side in fighting Madame Masque and the Maggia in Central Park. When Tombstone orders White Rabbit to have the Sinister Syndicate and those on their side pull out of Central Park, Trapstr immobilizes She-Hulk with her adhesives before fleeing.

== Other versions ==
- An alternate universe version of the Trapster from Earth-311 appears in Marvel 1602: Fantastick Four as a member of the Frightful Four.
- Paste Pot Peep, an alternate universe funny animal version of Paste Pot Pete from Earth-8311, appears in Peter Porker, the Spectacular Spider-Ham #16.

== In other media ==
=== Television ===
- Peter Petruski / Trapster appears in The New Fantastic Four episode "The Frightful Four", voiced by Gene Moss. This version uses complex traps instead of adhesives and is a member of the Wizard's Frightful Four.
- Trapster, renamed Peter Patraski, appears in the Fantastic Four episode "And the Wind Cries Medusa", voiced by Beau Weaver. This version is a member of the Wizard's Frightful Four.
- Peter Petruski / Trapster appears in the Fantastic Four: World's Greatest Heroes episode "Frightful", voiced by Sam Vincent. This version is a member of the Wizard's Frightful Four.
- Peter Petruski / Paste-Pot Pete appears in The Super Hero Squad Show, voiced by Dave Boat. This version is a member of Doctor Doom's Lethal Legion.
- Peter Petruski / Trapster appears in Ultimate Spider-Man, voiced by Steven Weber. This version is a member of the Frightful Four.
- Peter Petruski / Trapster makes a non-speaking cameo appearance in the Avengers Assemble episode "The Avengers Protocol".
- Peter Petruski / Trapster appears in Marvel Super Hero Adventures, voiced by Bradley Duffy.
- A genderbent incarnation of Trapster appears in Spidey and His Amazing Friends, voiced by Deva Marie Gregory.
- Peter Petruski / Trapster appears in Lego Marvel Avengers: Mission Demolition, voiced by Steve Blum.

=== Video games ===
Peter Petruski / Trapster appears in Ultimate Marvel vs. Capcom 3.
