= Black Mariah =

Marvel comics character

- Black Mariah (left) with Jennifer "White Jennie" Royce on the cover of Power Man and Iron Fist Vol. 3, #3 (June 2016). Art by Sanford Greene.

Publication information
- Publisher: Marvel Comics
- First appearance: Luke Cage, Hero for Hire #5 (January 1973)
- Created by: Billy Graham; George Tuska; Steve Englehart

In-story information
- Full name: Mariah Dillard
- Species: Human
- Place of origin: Earth
- Team affiliations: Pride; Rat Pack
- Partnerships: White Jennie

Black Mariah (Mariah Dillard) is a supervillain appearing in American comic books published by Marvel Comics. The character is usually depicted as an enemy of Luke Cage. She was created by Billy Graham, George Tuska, and Steve Englehart, and first appeared in Luke Cage, Hero for Hire #5 (January 1973).

Alfre Woodard portrayed Mariah Dillard in the series Luke Cage, set in the Marvel Cinematic Universe.

== Publication history ==
Black Mariah first appeared in Luke Cage: Hero for Hire #5 (January 1973) and was created by George Tuska and Steve Englehart.

== Fictional character biography ==
Mariah Dillard is the leader of the Rat Pack, a gang based in New York who make their living by recovering the bodies of the recently deceased and taking their valuables. During one of these thefts, a widow of one of the victims hires Power Man to find her husband's body. Power Man finds the hideout of Black Mariah, leading to a clash with Mariah and her men. Power Man defeats Mariah and her cohorts and turns them over to the police.

After some time in prison, Black Mariah starts a drug-dealing enterprise and becomes the primary distributor of Acid Z, a potent drug that makes its users crazy and often suicidal. When Luke Cage's friend David Griffith obtains some Acid Z, Cage goes looking for him while Iron Fist tracks down the drug's distributor. Iron Fist finds Mariah's hideout and learns that she has hired Scimitar as an enforcer. Cage joins Iron Fist in battle after learning of his old foe's involvement in the drug distribution. The Heroes for Hire make short work of Mariah and Scimitar, crushing their drug operation and turning them over to the police.

Black Mariah is featured in the 2016 relaunch of Power Man and Iron Fist. Here, she teams up with former Heroes for Hire secretary Jennifer Royce in taking down Tombstone's empire.

Black Mariah later appears as a member of Alex Wilder's incarnation of the Pride.

During the "Gang War" storyline, Black Mariah attends a crime lord meeting, where she states that Harlem is up for grabs. Mariah's group attacks a warehouse where White Rabbit and her henchman Kareem are, but are confronted by Beetle and the Sinister Syndicate. Beetle flies Mariah up to the sky and drops her, though she survives.

== Powers and abilities ==
While Black Mariah has no powers, her weight, estimated to be 400 lbs., enables her to strike with great force. Outside of her fighting experience, she has been known to catch her enemies off-guard.

== In other media ==
Black Mariah, born Mariah Stokes, appears in Luke Cage, portrayed by Alfre Woodard as an adult and Megan Miller as a teenager. This version is a New York City councilwoman, the granddaughter of Harlem crime lord Maybelline Stokes, older cousin of Cornell Stokes, and estranged mother of Tilda Johnson. After Diamondback and Luke Cage are arrested, Mariah takes over Harlem's criminal underworld and enters a relationship with Shades. In the second season, Mariah prepares to go legitimate and retire from her family's criminal activities while attempting to reconnect with Tilda. Mariah is later arrested by authorities and fatally poisoned by Tilda. Before dying, she bequeaths Stokes's keyboard to Tilda and the night club Harlem's Paradise to Cage to broker peace between Harlem's gangs.
