= Silvermane =

Marvel Comics supervillain

- Silvermane as depicted in Peter Parker: The Spectacular Spider-Man #70 (September 1982). Art by Ed Hannigan.

Publication information
- Publisher: Marvel Comics
- First appearance: The Amazing Spider-Man #73 (June 1969)
- Created by: Stan Lee (writer); John Buscema (artist)

In-story information
- Alter ego: Silvio Manfredi
- Species: Human cyborg
- Team affiliations: The Maggia; Hydra
- Notable aliases: Supreme Hydra
- Abilities: Criminal mastermind; Skilled hand-to-hand combatant and marksman; Cybernetic enhancement: Superhuman strength, speed, stamina, durability, and senses

Silvermane (Silvio Manfredi) is a supervillain appearing in American comic books published by Marvel Comics. A notorious Italian-American crime boss and prominent figure in the Maggia, a fictional organized crime syndicate, he is usually depicted as an adversary of the superhero Spider-Man and the father of Joseph Manfredi. Silvermane later became a cyborg in an attempt to extend his lifespan.

The character has made appearances in several forms of media outside of comics, including animated series and video games. Brendan Gleeson portrayed an Irish version of the character named Finbar "Finn" Byrne in the Amazon Prime Video television series Spider-Noir (2026).

== Publication history ==
Silvermane first appeared in The Amazing Spider-Man #73, and was created by Stan Lee and John Buscema.

The character's original storyline was about a mysterious stone tablet coveted by several villains. The "Tablet Saga" proved popular, although artist John Romita Sr. said that it was not originally intended as an arc, stating "We never even thought up Silvermane until the seventh issue [of the story arc], let alone a 'socko' ending."

== Fictional character biography ==
Silvio Manfredi, nicknamed "Silvermane" for his near-white hair, is a professional criminal originally from Corleone, Sicily, Italy. He started his criminal career as a racketeer in the Maggia, eventually forming his own crime family and becoming a powerful Maggia Don.

In his first appearance, an elderly Silvermane forces Curt Connors to make a potion from an ancient clay tablet to grant himself immortality. However, the serum instead causes him to rapidly de-age and eventually fade from existence. Silvermane eventually reappears, revealing that he had mystically aged to his forties. He regains control of his family, seeking to form an alliance with Hydra, determined to take over the world as their leader, the Supreme Hydra. He is defeated by Daredevil, Nick Fury, and S.H.I.E.L.D. Silvermane reappears in New York in an attempt to unite all of New York's gangs under his leadership and take over the criminal underworld. However, his plans are complicated by the Green Goblin, who opposed him. During a confrontation between the Goblin, Silvermane and Spider-Man, Silvermane falls from a great height, but survives.

Silvermane has worked with many super-villains, such as Hammerhead, and he has also been known to be a rival of the Kingpin, even once trying to assassinate the crime lord while he was suffering from amnesia. His former partner, Dominic Tyrone, assumed the identity of the Rapier and sought vengeance against Silvermane for betraying him by attempting to take his life. A flashback one-shot focused heavily on Silvermane's lifetime of corruption and crime, going back to his early career in Italy. The framework was reporter Ben Urich investigating the background of the Maggia. He learned that Silvermane was a legendary criminal figure for decades; mothers would even warn their children to behave or "One-Eye" would get them.

In his old age, Silvermane's injuries cause his youth serum to wear off, rendering him an invalid. Though bedridden, he continues to run his criminal empire until Dagger nearly kills him. Silvermane attempted to prolong his life by transforming himself into a cyborg. Silvermane uses a remote-controlled android doppelganger to battle Spider-Man, attempting to boost the power of his remaining organic parts by harvesting new ones from Spider-Man's body.

Silvermane is killed during a shootout with Owl's gang at a New York City scrap yard. Months later, he apparently returns along with other deceased members of his gang during the Maggia's losing battle with the forces of Mister Negative. However, this is later revealed to be a ruse orchestrated by a mobster named Carmine: "Silvermane" is actually a lifelike robotic duplicate controlled by a hired Mysterio to give Carmine more influence within the Maggia and position him to take over. The tables are turned on Carmine when Mysterio uses the duplicate to murder him, seemingly as a plot to take over the Maggia himself.

Silvermane's head is shown to still be alive as it was found by a young boy when he traveled into the scrap yard, before then being stolen by the Shocker. The head is used as leverage by Spider-Man's foes to take control of the Maggia, but the team members turn on each other when it comes time to decide who will actually be in charge. Shocker protects Silvermane from Punisher. In return, the crime boss nominates him as his successor to head the Maggia.

During the "Gang War" storyline, Silvermane and Count Nefaria discuss the upcoming gang war. In a turn of events, Silvermane loses control of his body and attacks Count Nefaria. He is reduced to a disembodied head once. Controlled by Madame Masque, Silvermane accompanies the Maggia in fighting Spider-Man.

== Powers and abilities ==
Silvermane was considered to be one of the Maggia's most legendary bosses. He is an excellent unarmed combatant and marksman, as well as a brilliant planner, organizer, and strategist. The magic potions he uses temporarily grant him a form of immortality, appearing in his early-to-mid 40s.

His preferred weapons are numerous machine guns, especially the Thompson .45 caliber.

Later, Silvermane's brain, vital organs, and head were transplanted into a robotic body, thus increasing his physical attributes to abnormal levels. However, his remaining biological parts needs careful protection because of their extreme vulnerability.

== Other versions ==
- An alternate universe version of Silvermane from Earth-58163 appears in House of M.
- An alternate universe version of Silvermane from Earth-1610, Allan Silvermane, appears in the Ultimate Marvel universe.

== In other media ==
=== Television ===
Silvermane (left) and Tombstone as depicted in Spider-Man (1994).

- Silvermane appears in the Spider-Man (1981) episode "Wrath of the Sub-Mariner", voiced by Paul Winchell.
- Silvermane appears in Spider-Man: The Animated Series, voiced by Jeff Corey as an old man, Townsend Coleman as a young man, Matthew McCurley as a child, and Cannon Young as a baby. This version is a rival crime lord of the Kingpin and the father of Alisa Silver. In the episodes "Tablet of Time", "Ravages of Time", and "Partners", Silvermane seeks out the titular tablet, an artifact capable of rejuvenating an individual's youth, so he can achieve immortality due to his irregular childhood. After locating it and kidnapping and forcing Curt Connors to decipher it, Silvermane uses the tablet, only to be physically reverted into a child while retaining his mind. In response, Silvermane and Alisa work with Alistair Smythe to use neogenic technology to switch ages with Spider-Man. However, the Vulture interferes and takes Spider-Man's place, leading to Silvermane returning to his original age.
- Silvermane appears in The Spectacular Spider-Man, voiced by Miguel Ferrer. This version is a rival crime lord to Tombstone and the father of Sable Manfredi who was arrested and incarcerated 12 years prior to the series after Frederick Foswell exposed his criminal activities to the FBI. Tombstone subsequently took Silvermane's territory while Sable ran his empire's remnants in her father's absence.
- Silvermane appears in Marvel's Spider-Man (2017), voiced by Nolan North. This version is the leader of the Goblin Nation's Cyber Goblins.
- Silvermane appears in the Moon Girl and Devil Dinosaur episode "Family Matters", voiced by Jonathan Banks. This version is the arch-enemy of Turbo who wants to claim her suit for his own ends. He is ultimately defeated by Turbo and Moon Girl, who trick him into downloading his consciousness into a teddy bear.
- An original incarnation of Silvermane appears in Spider-Noir, portrayed by Brendan Gleeson. This version is Finbar "Finn" Byrne, an Irish mob boss who frequently crossed paths with Ben Reilly in the past. He is ultimately killed by Cat Hardy after he killed her fiancé and controlled most of her life.

=== Video games ===
- Silvermane appears in beta versions of Spider-Man (1995), but was replaced with a robot in the final version.
- Silvermane appears as a boss in the Nintendo DS version of Spider-Man: Shattered Dimensions, voiced by Steve Blum. Having survived to the year 2099 due to his cybernetic body, he attempts to use a fragment of the Tablet of Order and Chaos to become immortal, only to be defeated by Spider-Man 2099.
- Silvermane appears as a playable character in Lego Marvel Super Heroes 2, as part of the "Cloak and Dagger" DLC.

=== Miscellaneous ===
Silvermane appears in Spider-Man: Forever Young, a novel written by Stefan Petrucha that serves as a sequel to the comics' tablet storyline. Two years after the original storyline, Silvermane fluctuates between being a child and adult as he attempts to force Curt Connors and Spider-Man to retrieve the tablet and stabilize his condition. Even after Connors's research asserts that the tablet essentially cycles someone through their reincarnations in one lifetime to try to achieve true karma, Silvermane refuses to accept this and attempts to blackmail Spider-Man to help him after deducing his true identity. Spider-Man eventually confronts Silvermane in the latter's church hideout. The ensuing battle ends with Silvermane burning the church down to try to kill Spider-Man, though his ultimate fate is left unclear.
