= Gang War (comics) =

2023 Marvel comics storyline

- Publisher: Marvel Comics
- Publication date: December 2023 – February 2024
- Main characters: Spider-Man (Peter Parker); Spider-Man (Miles Morales); Daredevil (Elektra Natchios); Jackpot (Mary Jane Watson); Luke Cage; Shang-Chi; Spider-Boy; Spider-Woman (Jessica Drew); She-Hulk; Beetle; Tombstone; Madame Masque

Creative team
- Writer(s): Zeb Wells; John Romita Jr.

"Gang War" is a 2023 storyline published by Marvel Comics. It was created by Zeb Wells and John Romita Jr. The story involves Spider-Man and the local superheroes working to deal with a gang war between the organized crime groups after Tombstone was shot and the crime families plan to take over the criminal underworld.

Amazing Spider-Man (vol. 6) #39, Deadly Hands of Kung Fu: Gang War #1, and Luke Cage: Gang War #2 were dedicated in memory of Keith Giffen who died from a stroke on October 9, 2023. Amazing Spider-Man (vol. 6) #40, Luke Cage: Gang War #3, Miles Morales: Spider-Man (vol. 2) #14, and Spider-Woman (vol. 8) #2 saluted the retirement of Alison Gill.

The event overall received mixed to negative reviews, with criticism directed towards Romita's artwork, the large number of tie-ins, pacing, inconsistent character arcs, and the lack of focus on Peter Parker's Spider-Man. However, the ongoing titles for Miles Morales: Spider-Man and Spider-Woman in the event were positively received.

== Publication history ==
Gang War details the crime families of New York City going to war after Tombstone was shot by Shotgun during the wedding of Janice Lincoln and Randy Robertson. With the crime families blaming each other for calling the hit and planning to take over the criminal underworld, Spider-Man works to keep the gang war from getting worse with help from the local superheroes while also dealing with the anti-vigilante laws that cause all the sides to come into conflict with the NYPD.

== Plot ==
=== Lead-up ===
Tombstone's daughter Janice Lincoln is going to marry Robbie Robertson's son Randy Robertson. Their marriage is attended by Peter Parker, Aunt May, Martha Robertson, and the crime lords Hammerhead, Mister Negative, Crime Master, Diamondback, Madame Masque, Black Mariah, and Owl. Shotgun crashes the wedding on his motorcycle and shoots Tombstone. As Tombstone is loaded into an ambulance, the crime lords blame each other for the attack.

The next day, Hammerhead meets with Lady Yulan, Mister Negative, Owl, and Black Mariah. As Yulan and Negative hold each other accountable for what happened, Hammerhead states that he is backed by Count Nefaria and Silvermane as Owl states that he will stand down for now. Hammerhead states that Madame Masque's territory is up for grabs and that they will divide Tombstone's territory.

=== Main plot ===
In New York City six hours after the first strike, two people work to get to Central Park for safety. They are ambushed by Ringmaster, who mind-controls them to join his army of brainwashed civilians. Ringmaster tries to brainwash Elektra, only to be taken down. Luke Cage tells Spider-Man that Mister Negative is moving in on Lady Yulan's territory, Diamondback is making a play for Downtown Manhattan, and Hobgoblin is causing trouble in Brooklyn. Elektra heads off to deal with the trouble in Hell's Kitchen, Spider-Woman goes to Downtown to confront Diamondback, Miles Morales heads to Brooklyn, and Spider-Man asks She-Hulk to deal with Monster Metropolis. Janice Lincoln (Beetle) informs White Rabbit, Lady Octopus, Scorpia, and Trapstr that the Upper East Side has been taken care of by Spider-Man and is up for grabs. Spider-Man and She-Hulk are approached by Tombstone, who proposes an alliance.

Tombstone tells Spider-Man and She-Hulk that he has arranged a meeting with Wilson Fisk. As Spider-Man, She-Hulk, and Tombstone meet with Fisk, they learn from him that Rose has been drawn into the gang war and is making a play for territory and revenge. Elsewhere, Madame Masque, Shotgun, and Silvermane learn about the struggle downtown between Shang-Chi and Mister Negative, their acquiring over Crime Master's former territory, and Rose fighting Beetle. At Sugar Hill, Beetle is still fighting Rose while the rest of the Sinister Syndicate are fighting Digger.

At Sugar Hill, the armored soldiers who work for Fisk make off with Rose, leaving the Sinister Syndicate in charge of Sugar Hill. It is revealed that Madame Masque has used a spell to mind-control Shotgun into serving her. Madame Masque is given special gauntlets from Rabble and mind-controls Silvermane, and Count Nefaria as well.

Madame Masque and her forces confront Beetle, who refuses to give up her territory to the Maggia. Spider-Man's allies show up and work to stop the conflict. Tombstone punches Shotgun, breaking his mind control. After falling back, Beetle tells White Rabbit not to re-engage until further notice. As the fight rages on, Beetle hangs back as Tombstone arrives as she tells him that she's going to have one chance to take Madame Masque out. Tombstone rips off one of Beetle's wings, then knocks her out.

As Spider-Man's forces are overpowered, Luke Cage arrives with Jackpot and Spider-Boy. As Count Nefaria advises Silvermane to save Spider-Man's death for Madame Masque, Shotgun shoots the sigils associated with Madame Masque's mind-control spell, freeing her victims. Spider-Man webs up Madame Masque's gauntlet, which explodes and incapacitates her. Later that night, White Rabbit is told by Tombstone that Beetle has left New York City after their disagreement. Tombstone states that he intends to take control of New York City, as most of his opposition has been eliminated.

=== Aftermath ===
Elektra is attacked by Bellona, who states that they have unfinished business. When Bellona falls off the building, Elektra tries to catch her only for Bellona to cut the rope. Afterwards, Elektra is contacted by Spider-Man who wants to meet with her as Elektra hopes that Bellona survived. Elektra later finds that Bellona's body disappeared from where it should have been on the ground.

Julia Gao meets with Luke Cage to inform her about Fisk's law being repealed and that the Cape-Killers must disband. Gao storms out and walks with a man named Brooks stating that she will have to find another way to protect the city. At Misty Knight's warehouse, Miles does a presentation to Knight, Ms. Marvel, Shift, and Starling involving Rabble's weapon supplying to criminals as Miles plans to reason with her. Meanwhile, Gao finds Rabble and states to her that she wants to see the other side's perspective for once.

== Issues ==
=== Gang War: First Strike ===
Title	Writer	Artist	Colorist	Release date
The Amazing Spider-Man Gang War: First Strike #1	Zeb Wells; Cody Ziglar	Joey Vazquez; Julian Shaw	Bryan Valenza	November 29, 2023

==== Series Tie-ins ====
Title	Issue(s)	Writer	Artist	Colorist	Debut date	Conclusion date
The Amazing Spider-Man (vol. 6)	37-38	Zeb Wells	Ed McGuinness; Emilio Laiso; Mark Farmer; Wade von Grawbadger	Erick Arciniega; Marcio Menyz	November 8, 2023	November 22, 2023
Miles Morales: Spider-Man (vol. 2)	12	Cody Ziglar	Partha Pratim	Bryan Valenza	November 29, 2023	
Spider-Woman (vol. 8)	1	Steve Foxe	Carola Borelli	Arfif Prianto	November 29, 2023	

==== Limited Series ====
Title	Issue	Writer	Artist	Colorist	Release date
Luke Cage: Gang War #1	1	Rodney Barnes	Ramon Bachs	Andrew Dalhouse	November 29, 2023

=== Main series ===
Title	Issues	Writer	Artist	Colorist	Debut date	Conclusion date
The Amazing Spider-Man (vol. 6)	39-44	Zeb Wells	John Romita Jr. Scott Hanna	Marcio Menyz	December 6, 2023	February 28, 2024

=== Tie-in issues ===
==== Limited series ====
Title	Issues	Writer(s)	Artist(s)	Colorist	Debut date	Conclusion date
Daredevil: Gang War	1-3	Erica Schultz	Sergio Dávila; Sean Parsons	Ceici De La Cruz	December 13, 2023	February 7, 2024
Luke Cage: Gang War	2-4	Rodney Barnes	Ramon Bachs	Andrew Dalhouse	December 13, 2023	February 24, 2024
Deadly Hands of Kung Fu: Gang War	1-3	Greg Pak	Caio Majado	Jim Campbell	December 27, 2023	February 14, 2024

==== Series tie-ins ====
Title	Issues	Writer(s)	Artist(s)	Colorist	Debut date	Conclusion date
Miles Morales: Spider-Man (vol. 2)	13-16	Cody Ziglar	Federica Mancin; Federico Vicentini	Bryan Valenza	December 13, 2024	February 14, 2024
Spider-Woman (vol. 8)	2-4	Steve Foxe	Carola Borelli	Arfif Prianto	December 27, 2024	February 21, 2024

==== Infinity Comics ====
Title	Issues	Writer(s)	Artist(s)	Colorist	Debut date	Conclusion date
Spider-Man Unlimited Infinity Comic	19-24	Preeti Chhibber	E.J. Su	Federico Blee	January 9, 2024	February 21, 2024

==== One-shots ====
Title	Writer	Artist	Colorist	Release date
Jackpot	Celeste Bronfman	Eric Gapstur; Joey Vazquez	Edgar Delgado; Erick Arciniega	January 17, 2024

=== Gang War: Aftermath ===
==== Series tie-ins ====
Title	Issue	Writer	Artist	Colorist	Release date
Miles Morales: Spider-Man (vol. 2)	17	Cody Ziglar	Partha Pratim; Federico Vicentini	Bryan Valenza	February 28, 2024

==== Limited Series ====
Title	Issue	Writer	Artist	Colorist	Release date
Daredevil: Gang War	4	Erica Schultz	Sergio Dávila; Sean Parsons	Ceici De La Cruz	March 6, 2024

== Reception ==
According to ComicbookRoundup, the entire event received an average rating of 6.8 out of 10 based on 104 reviews. Tim Rooney from Comicsbeat wrote "If this were Marvel Universe: Gang War, I could imagine giving this a recommendation. But for a story in Amazing Spider-Man, it is disappointing, and another example of how this title is held back by editorial and publishing demands to keep Peter Parker frozen in amber."
