= Superior Spider-Month =

- Cover of Superior Spider-Man #14. Art by Humberto Ramos.
- Publisher: Marvel Comics
- Publication date: July 2013
- Genre: Superhero

Creative team
- Writer: Various
- Artist: Various

"Superior Spider-Month" is a 2013 comic book branding that ran through all Spider-Man family of books published by Marvel Comics. It began in July 2013, marking a major change in the status quo of the Spider-Man storylines in the aftermath of Superior Spider-Man #13 and saw Superior Spider-Man sporting a new costume, getting a new headquarters and recruiting henchmen. In addition three new titles Superior Spider-Man Team-Up, Superior Foes of Spider-Man and Superior Carnage also debuted while Superior Spider-Man and Morbius: The Living Vampire were also bannered.

== Publication history ==
Promotional image for Superior Spider-Week

In March 2013, Marvel released a teaser titled Superior Spider-Week which consisted of five joined images. Next week saw the release of more information as three new titles were announced with rest of two images being covers of Superior Spider-Man #9 and #14 reflecting major status quo change.

== Branded Series ==
=== New Series ===
- Superior Spider-Man Team-Up
- Superior Foes of Spider-Man
- Superior Carnage (5-issue Limited Series)

=== Other Series ===
- Superior Spider-Man #13, 14
- Morbius: The Living Vampire #7
