= Sharon Ventura =

Marvel comic book character

- Sharon Ventura makes her first appearance as the new Ms. Marvel. From The Thing #35 (May 1986). Art by Paul Neary.

Publication information
- Publisher: Marvel Comics
- First appearance: The Thing #27 (September 1985)
- Created by: Mike Carlin; Ron Wilson

In-story information
- Alter ego: Sharon Ventura
- Species: Human mutate
- Team affiliations: Fantastic Four; Frightful Four; Unlimited Class Wrestling Federation; Avengers
- Notable aliases: Ms. Marvel, She-Thing
- Abilities: Highly proficient hand to hand combatant Skilled martial artist Expert stuntwoman, scuba diver, skydiver, motorcyclist, mountain climber, skier, lion tamer and wrestler As Ms. Marvel: Superhuman strength and endurance As She-Thing: Superhuman strength, durability and endurance Rock-like skin

Sharon Ventura, also known as She-Thing, is a fictional character appearing in American comic books published by Marvel Comics. She has used the pseudonym Ms. Marvel and has served as a member of the Fantastic Four and the female wrestlers known as the Grapplers.

== Publication history ==
Created by Mike Carlin and Ron Wilson, the character first appeared in Thing #27 (September 1985).

== Fictional character biography ==
Sharon Ventura (as the She-Thing) battles the Fantastic Four. From Fantastic Four #379.

Sharon Ventura meets Thing at the time when he was involved with the Unlimited Class Wrestling Federation (UCWF). Inspired by him, she signs up for the Power Broker's program to have her strength augmented and join the UCWF. The Power Broker employs Dr. Karl Malus to create super-powered wrestlers for his competitions. Sharon is unaware of the criminal activities of Power Broker or Malus. It has been implied that she was raped while a prisoner of Malus, which caused her to temporarily develop an intense hatred and distrust of men. Sharon manages to break free before Malus can augment her. She adopts a costume which UCWF minder Ann Fraley (Auntie Freeze) had arranged for her, taking the name Ms. Marvel. Alongside the Thing, she battles the Grapplers and the UCWF wrestlers.

Sharon later joins the Fantastic Four. Shortly after joining the Fantastic Four, Sharon is mutated by cosmic rays and gains a similar appearance and powers to those of the Thing. Although she never officially retires her Ms. Marvel moniker, Sharon becomes more popularly known as She-Thing.

She-Thing later leaves the Fantastic Four and begins working for Doctor Doom, who restores her human form. She is sent by Doom to spy on the Fantastic Four, but refuses to betray them. In response, Doom mutates Sharon into a much more monstrous form. After a bout of insanity, she briefly joins the Frightful Four and nearly kills Sue Storm.

During the 2008 "Secret Invasion" storyline, a Skrull impersonating Sharon's "She-Thing" persona is killed by the Skrull Kill Krew. The real Sharon is recovered alive from a downed Skrull ship after the final battle of the invasion.

Following the 2015 "Secret Wars" storyline, Ventura has returned to her original human appearance, and has been seen wrestling in her original outfit. She is later shown to have become an ally of the Avengers and is able to transform between her human and altered states at will.

== Powers and abilities ==
As Ms. Marvel, Sharon had superhuman strength and endurance, thanks to augmentation of her physical attributes by Karl Malus on behalf of the Power Broker. The mutagenic effect due to exposure to cosmic radiation that turned her into the She-Thing later greatly increased her physical attributes, especially her durability.

Sharon is highly proficient in hand-to-hand combat, and skilled at various martial arts, including tae kwon do and American boxing. She is also an expert stuntwoman, scuba diver, skydiver, motorcyclist, mountain climber, skier, lion tamer, and wrestler. She attended a military academy until she was expelled.

As part of Ben Grimm's Fantastic Four, she demonstrated her intelligence by solving complicated situations with her intuition and cunning.

== In other media ==
Sharon Ventura as Ms. Marvel appears as an alternate costume for Ms. Marvel (Carol Danvers) in Marvel: Ultimate Alliance.
