= Tombstone (character) =

Marvel Comics supervillain

- Tombstone as he appeared on the cover of The Amazing Spider-Man #9 (September 2022). Art by the character's co-creator Alex Saviuk.

Publication information
- Publisher: Marvel Comics
- First appearance: Web of Spider-Man #36 (March 1988)
- Created by: Gerry Conway; Alex Saviuk

In-story information
- Alter ego: Alonzo Thompson Lincoln
- Species: Human Mutate
- Team affiliations: Maggia; Sinister Twelve; The Hand; Hardcore's Untouchables; Tombstone's Gang
- Notable aliases: Lonnie Tombstone; Lonnie Lincoln; Kingpin
- Abilities: Criminal mastermind; Superhuman strength, stamina, durability, and reflexes; Expert hand-to-hand combatant and marksmanship

Alonzo Thompson "Lonnie" Lincoln, known as Tombstone, is a supervillain appearing in American comic books published by Marvel Comics. Depicted as a hulking albino man with filed teeth, Tombstone is a notorious crime boss in New York City who is primarily an enemy of Spider-Man and Daredevil. The father of Janice Lincoln, Tombstone has personal ties with Robbie Robertson.

The character has appeared in several media adaptations outside of comics over the years, including animated series and video games. Tombstone made his cinematic debut in the 2018 animated film Spider-Man: Into the Spider-Verse, voiced by Marvin "Krondon" Jones III, and is set to reprise the character in its sequel Spider-Man: Beyond the Spider-Verse (2027); he also makes a cameo as a different version of the character in the live-action Marvel Cinematic Universe film Spider-Man: Brand New Day (2026). Abraham Popoola portrayed Tombstone in Spider-Noir (2026).

== Publication history ==
The character was created by Gerry Conway and Alex Saviuk and first appeared in Web of Spider-Man #36 (March 1988). The character was immediately established to have a history with longtime Spider-Man supporting character Joseph "Robbie" Robertson, and was brought on as a regular in The Spectacular Spider-Man, which was then being written by Conway. Conway explained why he created Tombstone: "My general motivation was a need to work with the characters who weren't central to The Amazing Spider-Man title, since that was the main book. That meant I needed to focus my attention not on Aunt May or Mary Jane, or even J. Jonah Jameson, but on second- or even third-tier supporting characters. Joe Robertson was one of those. The second motive had to do with my desire to bring back the ruthless gangster Hammerhead had been, but not Hammerhead himself. It just came to me as a character type. One thing led to another, and as his backstory expanded, readers responded well to it."

In creating the character, Conway started with the name "Tombstone", and devised traits such as his albinism and squared-off features with the intent of making his appearance reminiscent of an actual tombstone. He told Saviuk to incorporate those traits when designing Tombstone's visual.

== Fictional character biography ==
Born as Lonnie Thompson Lincoln in Harlem, he started out as a troubled youth who was bullied by his peers because he was the neighborhood's only African-American albino. Taller and stronger than the other children, the young Lincoln started his life of crime in school, extorting protection money from his classmates. The school newspaper, edited by Joseph "Robbie" Robertson, was going to run a story exposing these illegal activities, but pulled it when Lincoln used scare tactics to intimidate Robertson. Lincoln allowed his personal demons to direct the course of his life and dropped out to join the ranks of organized crime. As a hitman and enforcer, he used his albinism to his advantage. He filed his teeth and nails to points, giving him the appearance of a vampire. This frequently caught his opponents off-guard, making it easier to kill them. He also lifted weights and engaged in many street fights to hone his fighting skills. One night, Robertson, now working for a local paper, went to meet a source only to see the source being killed by Lincoln. Lincoln threatened to kill Robertson if the story was brought out. Robertson kept the secret for over 20 years, allowing Lincoln to continue his rise through the criminal underworld. Now known as "Tombstone" for the many lives he had taken, Lincoln returns to New York City as the Kingpin's top hitman.

Tombstone eventually returns to Robertson's neighborhood, where Robertson finally works up the nerve to challenge him. He reveals the decades-old murder to the police, resulting in Tombstone's arrest, but not before Tombstone confronted and seriously injures Robertson, nearly permanently damaging his spine. Tombstone later encounters Spider-Man in Atlanta; Tombstone is defeated and sent to Philadelphia State Penitentiary.

Tombstone breaks out of prison but is confronted by Spider-Man; he eludes capture after a harrowing battle in which he nearly beats Spider-Man to death before Robertson stops him. Tombstone and Robertson are knocked into the Susquehanna River. When Tombstone attempts to kill Robertson in retaliation for turning on him during the fight with Spider-Man, Robertson stabs Tombstone with a pitchfork before escaping. Robertson is pardoned for helping recapture Tombstone.

Tombstone gains a superhuman physical constitution during his last attempt to kill Robertson, this time at an Oscorp chemical plant. Robertson shoots Tombstone and traps him in an airtight test chamber containing an experimental gas which is absorbed into his body, giving him superhuman strength.

After surviving an attempt on his life, Tombstone forms a new gang with Grim and Reaper. Tombstone is approached by Mr. Fish, who warns him about Black Cat's gang targeting him and his criminal empire in the upcoming gang war in Harlem. Tombstone and Fish are visited by Alex Wilder, who talks about his father Geoffrey Wilder's family business, as the two of them knew him when he was still alive. He also tells Tombstone and Fish that he is starting a new incarnation of the Pride based in Harlem. Afterwards, Alex beats up Tombstone and uses a magic spell to send Fish to Hell. After recovering from the attack, Tombstone rescues Fish from Hell with the help of Black Talon.

During the "Gang War" storyline, Tombstone is shot by Shotgun while attending Janice Lincoln and Randy Robertson's wedding. This triggers a massive gang war as New York City's crime lords battle for his territory. Tombstone forms a truce with Spider-Man and She-Hulk to deal with the war with brief aid from Kingpin. After freeing Shotgun from Madame Masque's control, Tombstone has his gang and the Sinister Syndicate retreat during the final fight between Spider-Man's allies and the Maggia. Following his victory, Tombstone becomes the new Kingpin of New York.

== Powers and abilities ==
Originally, Lonnie Lincoln had no powers, but was simply unusually tall at near-peak human condition. Lincoln later gained actual powers as a result of a mutagenic reaction to an experimental preservative gas. He possesses physical strength and reflexes that have been increased far beyond his original limits to abnormal levels. Tombstone's body can withstand extreme temperatures, great impact forces, high caliber bullets, and even toxic vapors without sustaining injury. He has filed all his teeth into razor-sharp points for intimidation on rare occasions.

In addition to his superhuman abilities, Tombstone is skilled in unarmed combat and has extensive street fighting experience. Even before gaining his powers, he was capable of killing opponents with his bare hands. His fighting style uses his enhanced strength and speed to overpower opponents. He is also experienced with conventional firearms and has connections within organized crime.

== Reception ==
- In 2020, Comic Book Resources (CBR) ranked the Tombstone 9th in their "Marvel: Dark Spider-Man Villains, Ranked From Lamest To Coolest" list.
- In 2022, Screen Rant included Tombstone in their "10 Spider-Man Villains That Are Smarter Than They Seem" and "10 Most Powerful Silk Villains In Marvel Comics" lists.
- In 2022, CBR ranked Tombstone 9th in their "10 Most Violent Spider-Man Villains" list.

== Other versions ==
=== Marvel Adventures ===
An alternate universe version of Tombstone from Earth-20051 appears in Marvel Adventures.

=== Marvel Noir ===
An alternate universe version of Tombstone from Earth-90214 appears in Luke Cage Noir. This version has scleroderma.

=== MC2 ===
An alternate universe version of Tombstone from Earth-982 appears in The Spectacular Spider-Girl.

=== Secret Wars ===
An alternate universe version of Tombstone from Earth-22191 appears in Secret Wars.

== In other media ==
=== Television ===
- Lonnie Lincoln / Tombstone appears in Spider-Man: The Animated Series, voiced by Dorian Harewood. This version was left disfigured upon falling into a chemical vat during a botched robbery turned accident that gave him his superpowers, for which he blamed Robbie Robertson ever since. Tombstone's revenge attempts on his former childhood friend puts him in regular conflict with Spider-Man while under the employ of various crime bosses such as Silvermane and Richard Fisk.
- Tombstone appears in The Spectacular Spider-Man, voiced initially by Keith David in the pilot episode and subsequently by Kevin Michael Richardson. This version is the original "Big Man of Crime", a calculating and intelligent crime lord who uses the "public mask" of L. Thompson Lincoln, a benevolent wealthy philanthropist. With Hammerhead as his second, he hires the Enforcers and enlists Norman Osborn to engineer super-villains to distract Spider-Man from his crimes. A gang war later breaks out between Tombstone, Doctor Octopus, and Silvermane over control of New York's criminal underworld, culminating in the three crime lords being pitted against each other and Spider-Man. Following this, Tombstone is defeated and exposed while his crime lord position is taken over by the Green Goblin.
- A young Lonnie Lincoln appears in Your Friendly Neighborhood Spider-Man, voiced by Eugene Byrd. This version is a football player at Rockford T. Bales High School, a friend of Peter Parker, and ex-boyfriend of Pearl Pangan. After being forced to join the 110th Street Gang to stop his younger brother Andre from joining them, he later earns the nickname "Tombstone" after saving the gang's leader, Big Donovan, from Mac Gargan. During a later battle with Gargan, Donovan flees while Lonnie is exposed to a mysterious gas developed by Otto Octavius and gains superhuman strength and durability. With Donovan's departure, Lonnie becomes the new leader of the 110th.
- A variant of the Noir version of Lonnie Lincoln / Tombstone appears in Spider-Noir, portrayed by Abraham Popoola. This version is a World War I soldier who was captured by the Germans and experimented on, causing him to develop armored crocodile-like skin. He is deemed a monster by the press as he lives with his mother in Harlem's Hooverville. He and other veterans with powers are recruited by Silvermane as enforcers. After the Spider and Daily Bugle reporter Robbie Robertson cure him, he decides to leave the city with his mother.

=== Film ===
- Tombstone appears in Spider-Man: Into the Spider-Verse, voiced by Marvin "Krondon" Jones III. This version is the Kingpin's personal bodyguard.
- Tombstone appears in Spider-Man: Brand New Day, with Marvin "Krondon" Jones III reprising his role in live-action. This version is a gangster and crime boss, being captured by Spider-Man and handed over to police detective Jean DeWolff.
- Tombstone will appear in Spider-Man: Beyond the Spider-Verse, played again by Marvin "Krondon" Jones III.

=== Video games ===
- Tombstone appears as a boss in Marvel Heroes, voiced by Nolan North.
- Tombstone appears as a boss in Spider-Man (2018), voiced by Corey Jones. This version is a biker gang leader with ties to major criminal outfits throughout New York City who gained his powers after being exposed to experimental Alchemax chemicals as a youth in Harlem. Within the game's continuity, Spider-Man has been a superhero for eight years and is well-familiar with Tombstone and his gang, having encountered them several times in the past. Over time, Tombstone developed a fixation on Spider-Man, viewing him as a "challenge" to work towards overcoming. After making a minor appearance in the main story when Mary Jane Watson discovers Tombstone's men building an armored vehicle for Martin Li, a side mission sees Spider-Man foiling an attempt by Tombstone to sell a new designer drug called "Grave Dust" that temporarily grants users his powers and developing an antidote that he uses to defeat Tombstone at his hideout.
- Tombstone appears in Spider-Man 2, voiced again by Corey Jones. As of this game, he has been paroled, reformed, and become a mechanic at a Coney Island amusement park.

== See also ==
- List of Spider-Man enemies
