= Overdrive (character) =

Publication information
- Publisher: Marvel Comics
- First appearance: Free Comic Book Day: Spider-Man (July 2007)
- Created by: Dan Slott; Phil Jimenez

In-story information
- Alter ego: James Beverley
- Species: Human
- Team affiliations: Sinister Six
- Abilities: Ability to convert any vehicle into a high-powered one

Overdrive (James Beverley) is a supervillain, appearing in American comic books published by Marvel Comics, usually depicted as an enemy of Spider-Man.

== Publication history ==
Created by Dan Slott and Phil Jimenez, Overdrive first appeared in Amazing Spider-Man: Swing Shift (May 2007), a Free Comic Book Day issue set after the events of the "Spider-Man: One More Day" storyline.

Something of a throwaway joke character, Overdrive made a few inconsequential appearances throughout Slott's run on The Amazing Spider-Man. Overdrive joined the Sinister Six during the Marvel Now! relaunch and featured as one of the main characters in The Superior Foes of Spider-Man.

== Fictional character biography ==
James Beverley is a race car driver who had dreams of being a superhero. When every attempt failed and he ended up in an accident, he gained the assistance of Power Broker. Mister Negative approached him and offered him a job in his criminal organization.

Overdrive is hired by Mister Negative to steal an artifact from a museum, but is unable to deliver it because of interference from Spider-Man. Overdrive leads Spider-Man on a high-speed chase through the streets of Manhattan. When Spider-Man smashes the windshield of Overdrive's car, he finds dozens of pieces of Spider-Man-related merchandise. Overdrive declares that he is Spider-Man's "biggest fan", even asking for an autograph as Spider-Man is trying to stop him.

The chase culminates in a car-wreck that leaves Overdrive and his vehicle hanging from a bridge in New York by Spider-Man's webbing with Spider-Man's trademark note, "Courtesy of your friendly neighborhood Spider-Man". Overdrive asks the police who were on the scene to arrest him if he could keep the note. Overdrive is later sent to steal the Sonic Pulse Generator from a laboratory, but is thwarted by Spider-Man. Negative tells his men to dispose of Overdrive and they put him in the trunk of Negative's limo. Overdrive escapes by converting the limo into one of his "tricked out" cars.

Overdrive is hired by Boomerang to join his Sinister Six. Overdrive steals the original Big Wheel vehicle and upgrades it through his powers. However, the Superior Spider-Man defeats Overdrive and the rest of the Sinister Six using a power-dampening field.

Overdrive appears as one of the main characters in the series Superior Foes of Spider-Man. He secretly admits that he only became a villain to gain a reputation and plans to eventually reform.

Overdrive later returns to working for Mister Negative again, working as a getaway driver for his henchmen. While in their safehouse, the Inner Demons are attacked by a revived Sin-Eater, who pursues Overdrive over the course of three days. Overdrive finds Spider-Man and asks him for protection, only to be shot and killed by Sin-Eater. After being taken to a morgue, Overdrive mysteriously comes back to life with no injuries.

== Powers and abilities ==
Overdrive can generate nanites which transform vehicles to his will, improving its physical abilities. These changes will revert if Overdrive is away from the vehicle for too long.

== In other media ==
- An original, Marvel 2099-inspired incarnation of Overdrive appears in the Nintendo DS version of Spider-Man: Edge of Time, voiced by Kari Wahlgren.
- Overdrive appears in the Spider-Man episode "Bring on the Bad Guys", voiced by Ryan Blaney.
