= Spider-Man (1995 video game) =

- Packaging for the Genesis version
- Developer: Western Technologies
- Publisher: Acclaim Entertainment (Note: Released under the LJN brand name on the SNES.)
- Composer: Fletcher Beasley
- Platforms: Sega Genesis; Super Nintendo Entertainment System
- Release: NA: 1995; EU: March 10, 1995
- Genre: Action
- Mode: Single-player

Spider-Man is a side-scrolling action game developed by Western Technologies and published by Acclaim and LJN in 1995, based on the 1994–98 animated series of the same name. The game was released for the Sega Genesis and the Super Nintendo Entertainment System (SNES). The two versions of the game have the same basic story but have gameplay, level, and enemy differences.

== Gameplay ==
The game is a side-scrolling platformer. There are six levels in the SNES version: Laboratory, Construction Zone, Brooklyn Bridge, Coney Island, a showdown in J. Jonah Jameson's Penthouse, and Ravencroft Asylum, and five in the Genesis version: Laboratory, Coney Island and the Funhouse, The Deconstruction Zone, The Mean Streets of the City, and The Ravencroft Prison for the Insane.

== Reception ==
Next Generation reviewed the SNES version of the game, rating it two stars out of five, and stated that "there's some attempt at depth – like a few hidden rooms and cameo appearances by a number of other Marvel bad guys like the Lizard, for instance – but Spider-Man: The Animated Series is strictly a by-the-numbers affair". A GamePro reviewer described the SNES version as more of "a thinking game than an action caper" due to the player character's weak fighting skills and the limited number and variety of enemies. He concluded the game to be more for intermediate gamers than veteran gamers.

The four reviewers of Electronic Gaming Monthly panned the Genesis version, criticizing it for limited animation, poor sound, a lack of interesting player character abilities, and unappealing graphics with little color. They gave it an average score of 4.25 out of 10. A reviewer for Next Generation also panned the game, chiefly for its lack of originality. He gave it one out of five stars, commenting that "the graphics, sound, story, and the whole game are so horribly familiar and boring that this game isn't even worthy of the one star we give it". GamePro gave it a generally positive review, citing the numerous Marvel Comics characters who make guest appearances, the comic book style of the graphics, and the imaginative enemies. However, they shared EGM's opinion of the sound and also criticized that the controls are inaccurate.
