= Madame Masque =

Marvel Comics fictional character

- Madame Masque. Art by Carmen Carnero.

Publication information
- Publisher: Marvel Comics
- First appearance: (as Big M); Tales of Suspense #97 (October 1967) (as Whitney Frost); Tales of Suspense #98 (November 1967) (as Madame Masque); Iron Man #17 (September 1969)
- Created by: Stan Lee (writer); Gene Colan (artist)

In-story information
- Alter ego: Giulietta Nefaria (originally); Whitney Frost (legally changed)
- Species: Human
- Team affiliations: Maggia; Masters of Evil; Inner Guard
- Partnerships: Hood
- Notable aliases: Big M The Director; Kristine "Krissy" Longfellow
- Abilities: Master tactician; Highly skilled hand-to-hand combatant; Highly skilled athlete and gymnast; Expert markswoman; Utilizes firearms and high-tech devices; Telepathic resistance

Madame Masque (birth name Giulietta Nefaria but legally renamed Whitney Frost) is a supervillain appearing in American comic books published by Marvel Comics. Created by Stan Lee and Gene Colan, the character first appeared in Tales of Suspense #97 (October 1967). An occasional love interest and enemy of Iron Man and the daughter of Count Nefaria, she originally wore a golden mask to cover up her disfigured face and continues to do so after her face was healed.

Over the years, Madame Masque has appeared in various forms of media, including animated television series and video games. A version of Whitney Frost appears in the second season of the Agent Carter television series set in the Marvel Cinematic Universe, portrayed by Wynn Everett.

== Publication history ==
Whitney Frost first appeared in Tales of Suspense #97 (October 1967) as a powerful mob boss using the code name Big M and was created by Stan Lee and Gene Colan. She did not formally use her Madame Masque identity until Iron Man #17 (September 1969).

== Fictional character biography ==
Madame Masque was born as Giulietta Nefaria, the daughter of the master criminal Count Luchino Nefaria, in Rome, Italy. Her mother died when giving birth and Luchino wanted his daughter to lead a respectable life, so he gave the child to Byron Frost, a wealthy financier and an employee of Nefaria, and his wife Loretta Frost.

Frost called the child Whitney and raised her as his own. As a young adult, Whitney was a debutante and socialite, and became engaged to politician Roger Vane. Following the Frosts' deaths, Count Nefaria approached Whitney and revealed her true parentage, as he wishes for her to inherit his position as head of the Maggia, a Mafia-like organization based on the East Coast of the United States. Whitney at first refused, but when she tells Roger about her father, Roger ends their relationship out of fear that her connections to a known criminal would hamper his political prospects. Heartbroken, Whitney accepted her father's offer to join the Maggia and was trained by the Count in strategy, criminal activities, and combat. She turned out to be a brilliant student and when her father is imprisoned, she becomes the new "Big M", the leader of the Nefaria family of the Maggia. Her role as Big M brought her into conflict with Iron Man, an old enemy of Count Nefaria.

Whitney was forced to flee after a raid on Stark Industries. The plane she escaped in crashed and Whitney's face was badly scarred, but she was saved by the criminal Mordecai Midas and started to work for him. Midas is obsessed with gold and gave Whitney a golden mask to conceal her disfigured face. She also starts using the alias of "Madame Masque."

Madame Masque meets Tony Stark (Iron Man's alter ego) and the latter shows concern for her despite her scarred face. She turns on Midas to save Stark, but leaves him because of her criminal past. Unable to forget her feelings, she assumes the identity of Krissy Longfellow, Stark's personal secretary. Both come to know each other's true identity and start a romantic relationship. Their happiness is short-lived as Count Nefaria is dying due to a failed attempt to gain superhuman powers. Whitney hires the Ani-Men to bring her father to her and then asks Stark to find a cure for her father. Count Nefaria threatens Stark, and he is forced to fight the Ani-Men as Iron Man. Whitney is unable to choose between her father and her lover, and when Nefaria's life-support system is damaged in the fight, she goes insane with guilt and grief. Whitney returns to the Nefaria family and regains her former position as leader. She resumes her vendetta against Iron Man and his friends.

At one point, Frost becomes paranoid and starts to create physical copies of herself, known as bio-duplicates. One of her bio-duplicates, who is simply referred to as "Masque", turns on her creator and becomes an ally of the Avengers. She also creates robotic servants known as the Inner Guard and names them individually after notable historical traitors: Benedict, Brutus, Fawkes, Quisling, Monmouth (based on Benedict Arnold, Marcus Junius Brutus, Guy Fawkes, Vidkun Quisling, and the Duke of Monmouth) and two other, unnamed members.

Benedict successfully recaptures Masque for Whitney. Masque tries to convince her the Avengers are benevolent and that she should reach out to Stark again, but Whitney is still too fearful to do so. She continues to be a criminal figure of importance, until her father returns from the dead, now with superhuman abilities, and destroys her base. She reluctantly assists the Avengers and the Thunderbolts against the Count, but she secretly plans to betray and destroy both sides, her increased paranoia causing her to believe that she can trust no one but herself, despite moments of doubt such as when Stark unmasks in her presence but lowers his face-plate back when preparing to talk to the rest of the Avengers. Masque again tries unsuccessfully to convince her to side with the heroes, then joins the battle in Whitney's place. Masque obtains a weapon designed to disrupt Nefaria's powers that Whitney had prepared for her father, but is slain by Nefaria before she can use it. Madame Masque is shocked by her duplicate's nobility and sacrifice, with Iron Man's dismayed reaction at what appears to be her death compared to Nefaria's glee forcing her to recognize that Masque was right about the Avengers. Whitney joins the battle and plays a key role in her father's defeat, her weapon causing him to begin leaking ionic energy until he finally collapses. She renounces her criminal past, and MACH-II of the Thunderbolts offers her membership, but she declines, departing to parts unknown to consider her future. Before leaving, she asked MACH-II to thank everyone for her, especially Iron Man.

Madame Masque is hired by the Hood to take advantage of the split in the superhero community caused by the Superhuman Registration Act. She becomes the Hood's second in command (and his lover) and helps him and his forces fight the New Avengers. She is taken down by Doctor Strange and taken into S.H.I.E.L.D. custody. A group of Skrulls disguised as S.H.I.E.L.D. agents try to learn her true face so they can replace her with one of their own. The Hood frees her and kills all the Skrulls except one. In an unknown location attended by most of the Hood's army, they learn from the Skrull agent that the Skrulls plan on taking over Earth, believing it to be rightfully theirs. Masque rejoins the Hood's crime syndicate and takes part in an attack on the invading Skrull forces. She is among the Hood's army as they assist the heroes in their final battle against the Skrulls.

During the "Dark Reign" storyline, Norman Osborn puts a bounty on Tony Stark's head, and personally calls Madame Masque over to Stark Tower, offering the locations of Iron Man's multiple armories to help her find Stark. She tracks Stark to Russia, which Pepper Potts had also done. Masque captures and tortures Pepper before demanding that Stark tell her his true feelings to her real face. Stark admits that even after years of fighting, he still loves her, to which Masque reciprocates. However, when faced with a direct choice between Pepper or Masque, Stark chooses to save Pepper first. As Stark escapes to Afghanistan, Masque and Pepper fight hand-to-hand. Masque is defeated and imprisoned in a discarded Crimson Dynamo suit while Pepper disguises herself in her mask and costume to falsely report her own death to Osborn and turn over the Rescue armor, which is added to his personal collection of Iron Man suits.

Madame Masque escapes, and later participates in a surprise attack on the New Avengers, a trap set up by Osborn. Later, when The Hood attacks Doctor Strange in order to become the Sorcerer Supreme, she tries to help him deal with his possession by Dormammu, taking off her mask and confessing her feelings for him. When Osborn calls off the hunt for Stark after learning that he is in a persistent vegetative state, Masque decides to take matters into her own hands, and hires the Ghost to eliminate her old lover, a task at which Ghost fails.

Masque, along with the rest of the Hood's gang, joins in helping Osborn, in his Iron Patriot armor, with the Siege of Asgard. However, Loki retakes the Norn Stones from the Hood to help the Avengers and Asgardians battle the Void. Masque helps the Hood slip away. The Hood is pessimistic, knowing that his gang would simply sell him out. Therefore, Masque seeks out Count Nefaria for help. The New Avengers track her and the Hood using their contact John King. After a battle with Nefaria, the New Avengers capture all four villains and bring them to Maria Hill.

During the "Heroic Age" storyline, Hood escapes from prison and makes a play to assemble the Infinity Gauntlet, for which he recruits Masque. Hood uses the Reality Gem to heal Masque's disfigurement, but she continues to wear her golden mask.

She appears in Madripoor for the auction of a videotape showing Hawkeye assassinating the dictator of an unnamed Asian nation. However, the real Madame Masque is shown to be tied up and gagged in her hotel room; the "Masque" attending the auction is actually Hawkeye's partner Kate Bishop disguised in her costume. After the tape is destroyed, Masque vows vengeance on Hawkeye and Bishop. She attempts to capture Bishop by luring the girl to her home in California, where she drugs her. The teen manages to escape, and Masque swears to take revenge once again.

In the series "Avengers Undercover" Madame Masque appears as a member of the Shadow Council's Masters of Evil in Bagalia. She works as Helmut Zemo's right-hand woman.

In "All-New, All-Different Marvel", Madame Masque sets out to retrieve several magical objects to empower herself. During her journey, she is pursued by a mysterious group of ninjas. Iron Man catches onto her motives when she tries to steal a duplicate Wand of Watoomb from Castle Doom. Upon discovering the artifact she had stolen is fake, she kills her informant in a hotel in Montreal. Iron Man later confronts Masque in the hotel room and tries to reason with her. Startled by his presence, Masque unleashes a surprising display of enormous magical power. After traveling to Mary Jane Watson's nightclub, Jackpot, in Chicago, Masque confronts her former business partner Belhilio and kills him. She then faces off against Iron Man and Doctor Doom, which results in the nightclub being completely trashed. A furious Watson hits her in the face with a microphone, knocking her mask off, and Doom discovers that Masque has been demonically possessed. Iron Man is able to hold her down while Doom successfully performs an exorcism. By the time Iron Man regains consciousness, Doctor Strange arrives and informs him that he will take Masque away to heal her.

To combat the West Coast Avengers, Madame Masque formed a West Coast version of the Masters of Evil consisting of Eel, Graviton, Lady Bullseye, MODOK Superior, Satana, and Kate Bishop's parents Derek Bishop and Eleanor Bishop.

During the "Gang War" storyline, Madame Masque poses as Hammerhead's girlfriend before knocking him out with a combination of magic and an adamantium bar. Hammerhead's men are forced to swear an oath of Madame Masque as the new leader of the Maggia.

== Powers and abilities ==
Madame Masque has no superhuman powers. She is an athletic woman and a highly skilled hand-to-hand combatant in various martial arts and an expert markswoman. She is also a master strategist, organizer and disguiser. Madame Masque displayed some form of telepathic resistance. She has access to advanced technology like her bio-duplicates.

As leader of the Maggia family, Madame Masque commands unspecified numbers of Dreadnought robots modified from the original designs stolen from Hydra.

=== Equipment ===
Madame Masque wears body armor of an unknown composition with a gold metal faceplate, underneath which her face was chemically scarred. The faceplate is hard enough to deflect bullets without causing her any permanent injury. She carries a .475 Wildey Magnum revolver and other handguns, in addition to weapons that fire concussive blasts of energy or sleeping-gas cartridges.

== Reception ==
=== Accolades ===
- In 2009, IGN included Madame Masque in their "Marvel's Femme Fatales" list.
- In 2018, Comic Book Resources (CBR) ranked Madame Masque 5th in their "Iron Man: His 20 Deadliest Villains" list.
- In 2019, CBR ranked Madame Masque's relationship with Iron Man 4th in their "Marvel: 10 Best Romances Between Heroes And Villains" list.
- In 2019, Screen Rant ranked Madame Masque 10th in their "10 Strongest Female Marvel Villains" list.
- In 2020, CBR ranked Madame Masque 5th in their "10 Most Powerful Crime Bosses In Marvel Comics" list.
- In 2022, Newsarama ranked Madame Masque 3rd in their "Best Iron Man villains" list.
- In 2022, Screen Rant included Madame Masque in their "10 Most Powerful Wonder Man Villains In Marvel Comics" list.

== Other versions ==
=== House of M: Masters of Evil ===
In the House of M universe, Madame Masque fulfills a similar role as her mainstream counterpart. She serves as the second in command of the Hood's criminal syndicate, as well as being his mistress. She is with him during the uprising, and during the syndicate's invasion of a foreign country. She is one of the few criminals who decides to stay with Hood when the others decide that the heat from Magneto is too much and abandon him. She is killed in the final battle and it is mentioned that Hood and Masque had a very powerful love, which is what motivated him to keep fighting.

=== JLA/Avengers ===
Madame Masque appears in JLA/Avengers #4 as a brainwashed minion of Krona.

=== Marvel Noir ===
An alternate universe version of Madame Masque from Earth-90214 appears in the Marvel Noir universe. This version is Dr. Gialetta Nefaria, an Italian archeologist and former lover of adventurer Tony Stark who betrays him during the exploration of a remote island; Nefaria is left disfigured and presumed dead until she reemerges to fight Stark wearing a carved jade mask stolen from the island. She is ultimately killed by Pepper Potts.

== In other media ==
=== Television ===
- Madame Masque appears in the Iron Man (1994) episode "Beauty Knows No Pain", voiced by Lisa Zane.
- Madame Masque appears in Iron Man: Armored Adventures, voiced by Kristie Marsden. This version is Whitney Julietta Stane, the neglected teenage daughter of Obadiah Stane and love interest of Tony Stark, who uses a golden prototype disguise mask made by Howard Stark that lets her take on the appearance of anyone, but also emits unchecked radiation that eventually drives her insane. As Madame Masque, Whitney is a skilled acrobat and fighter, and uses other Stark International weapons and equipment in battle.
- A 1940s incarnation of Whitney Frost appears in the second season of Agent Carter, portrayed by Wynn Everett as an adult and by Ivy George and Olivia Welch as her younger selves. This version is inspired by Hedy Lamarr and Lauren Bacall. During her youth, she was Agnes Cully, a math and engineering prodigy whose abusive mother Wilma insisted that a woman's only worth to the world is her beauty. Despite this, Cully used her engineering skills for Isodyne Energy under her stage name "Whitney Frost" while working as a Hollywood actress. In the present, she manipulates her husband Calvin Chadwick into researching Zero Matter before her body is corrupted by the substance itself, which gives her the ability to absorb anything into her body. As a result, she comes into conflict with Peggy Carter and the Strategic Scientific Reserve despite her friendship with mob boss Joseph Manfredi. Whitney is ultimately deprived of her Zero Matter abilities and committed to an asylum.
- Whitney Frost / Madame Masque appears in Avengers Assemble, voiced by Wynn Everett. This version is a Hydra scientist and member of the Shadow Council who wields a Wakandan mask that enables her to control technology. In the episode "House of M", Frost lures the Avengers and Hydra into a trap, intending to siphon their technological knowledge so she can rule the world through its technology. Hawkeye and Black Panther destroy Frost's ship, which she tries to fix in vain as she falls to her death.
- Madame Masque appears in the M.O.D.O.K. episode "If Saturday Be... For the Boys!", voiced by Meredith Salenger.

=== Video games ===
- Madame Masque appears in Iron Man (2008), voiced by Courtenay Taylor.
- Madame Masque appears as a boss in Marvel: Avengers Alliance.
