= Scarecrow (Marvel Comics) =

Marvel Comics supervillain

- Scarecrow as depicted on the cover of Tales of Suspense #51 (March 1964). Art by Don Heck.

Publication information
- Publisher: Marvel Comics
- First appearance: Tales of Suspense #51 (Mar 1964)
- Created by: Stan Lee (writer); Don Heck (artist)

In-story information
- Alter ego: Ebenezer Laughton
- Team affiliations: Maggia; The Firm; Exterminators
- Partnerships: Unicorn
- Notable aliases: Umberto the Uncanny
- Abilities: Master acrobat and bird trainer; Superhuman strength, speed, stamina, agility, reflexes and a mutated pheromone via implants; Healing factor; Ability to induce fear in his victims

The Scarecrow (Ebenezer Laughton) is a supervillain appearing in American comic books published by Marvel Comics.

== Publication history ==
Scarecrow's first appearance was in Tales of Suspense #51 (March 1964), in a story created by Stan Lee and Don Heck.

== Fictional character biography ==
Ebenezer Laughton was born in Rhinebeck, New York, as the son of a farmer, along with his brother Ralph. Raised by an abusive mother, Laughton became a circus escape artist and contortionist, and while working as a carnival performer once helped Iron Man apprehend a fleeing culprit. However, he decided to make his profit in crime and became an accomplished burglar and professional thief while dressed as a scarecrow. He mostly worked alone—except for a flock of trained crows which served as carriers and killers. In his first appearance as the Scarecrow, he was defeated by Iron Man.

He joined Count Nefaria's short-lived team of super-mercenaries (which included Plantman, the original Eel, the original Porcupine, the original Unicorn and himself), and participated in Count Nefaria's attempt to hold Washington, D.C., for ransom before being defeated by the X-Men. He later worked for the Cowled Commander, but was defeated by Captain America and the Falcon. He then clashed with Captain America once more. Eventually, Laughton went insane, and he began murdering supporters of the Coalition for an Upstanding America, but was defeated by Captain America.

It was revealed in Iron Man: Enter the Mandarin that Laughton was motivated in part to become a supervillain by agents of the Mandarin who supplied him with his first costume and trained crows. He was allured by the idea of standing out in the growing field of industrial espionage.

Scarecrow embarked on a series of murders, and first battled the second Ghost Rider. He fell and was impaled on his own pitchfork during the battle with Ghost Rider, and was carried off by the Firm. He received surgical implants, carried out more killings, and abducted Stacy Dolan. He fought Captain America and Ghost Rider, surviving being shot and impaled, and was then enlisted by Mr. Stern for the Firm. He became undead, raised by the sorcerer Stern. Before this he possessed no superhuman powers save for his "rubber man" ability, but after his resurrection he gained superhuman strength, speed and endurance as well as the supernatural ability to induce fear. He also gained the ability to recover from any injury so long as he was in the presence of the fear of others. The Ghost Rider used this ability against the Scarecrow, briefly mangling his body, causing Scarecrow to heal in a crooked and contorted pose. He was later restored to his normal physical appearance by the government agent called Spook during the Ghost Rider in Chains story arc.

Laughton's physiology and mentality would fluctuate quite a bit over the years, given his employ/manipulation by various demonic/magical entities, resulting in continuing conflict with Ghost Rider and his allies, even becoming a ghost during one such campaign. Eventually, Laughton would be abandoned by these "magical employers" and stabilize physically, if not mentally.

Scarecrow was jailed in the Raft prison facility following a failed sexual assault upon hostages who were freed by the Falcon.

Scarecrow is among the army of villains recruited by Baron Zemo and his Thunderbolts to serve as "hero-hunters" during the events of the Civil War storyline.

Scarecrow showed up when Peter Parker unmasked himself, as one of a band of costumed villains (including Electro, the Molten Man, and Will o' the Wisp), hired by the Chameleon to attack Peter Parker in a lopsided revenge effort. Scarecrow was defeated and incarcerated. He later teamed again with Molten Man in a rampage which was halted by Captain America and the Punisher. The two criminals were sent as part of the "Thunderbolt Army" to flush heroes out of hiding. Cap was forced to prevent Punisher from killing Scarecrow once he'd been apprehended.

Ebenezer has been identified as one of the 142 registered superheroes who registered as part of the Initiative.

Someone that looks like Scarecrow was among the members of Hood's Crime Syndicate. He helped them assault the New Avengers' home until they were defeated. In "Secret Invasion", he is among the many supervillains who rejoined the Hood's crime syndicate and attacked an invading Skrull force. He joins with the Hood's gang in an attack on the New Avengers, who were expecting the Dark Avengers instead.

He is among the villains considered by Blackout and the Deacon to help them assassinate the Ghost Rider. He worked alongside Blackout and other villains on a mission to kill Ghost Rider, but was eventually defeated when Jaine Cutter bent his body around a carnival fence.

Scarecrow has also teamed up with Raoul Bushman as his right-hand man, in the 2009-2010 Moon Knight series. He was later seen during the Siege of Asgard as part of the Hood's crime syndicate.

During the Fear Itself storyline, Scarecrow takes advantage of the chaos in town by attacking with his army of crows only to end up fighting Wolverine.

== Weapons, abilities and equipment ==
The Scarecrow is a highly adept contortionist—extremely flexible and agile due to heavy training. He is double-jointed and can fit his body through any aperture at least one foot wide. He is therefore able to escape from conventional locks and chains, and to perform various acrobatic stunts. He is also a master at training birds. He often carries a pitchfork as a weapon.

He has a flock of two dozen pet crows, which he has taught to perform a variety of actions in response to his hand gestures and tones of voice. At his command, the crows will attack and kill the victims he designates. The crows have been trained to attack anyone who rushes at the Scarecrow or points a gun at him. They are trained to carry off jewels, valuables, and anything else at which the Scarecrow points.

As a result of surgical implants given to him by doctors employed by the Firm, the Scarecrow's body produces a mutated pheromone that affects the adrenal glands of people and animals (even crows) within twenty feet of him, causing a sensory overload which triggers a panic attack. The same pheromone affects the Scarecrow's own adrenal system, giving him superhuman strength and stamina.

When the Scarecrow was raised from the dead by the sorcerer Stern, he became able to directly induce fear in his victims, and could survive and quickly recover from any injury, even typically fatal ones, as long as he was in the presence of the fear of others.

== Other versions ==
=== DC vs. Marvel ===
In DC vs. Marvel, Scarecrow briefly teamed up with DC's Scarecrow in an attempt to kidnap Lois Lane. They were thwarted by Ben Reilly. In the Amalgam Universe, Scarecrow was a combination of Marvel's Scarecrow and DC's Scarecrow.

== In other media ==
- Scarecrow appears as a boss in Ghost Rider, voiced by Dave Wittenberg.
- Scarecrow appears as an action figure for the Ghost Rider film line by Hasbro. A "comic-styled", five-inch (127 mm) figure including crows and a pitchfork was included as part of a Toys "R" Us exclusive figure-set, "The Spider & The Scarecrow" featuring Spider-Man.
