= Eel (Marvel Comics) =

Marvel Comics fictional characters

The Eel is an alias used by two fictional characters appearing in American comic books published by Marvel Comics. The first character to take up the identity was Leopold Stryke who first appeared in Strange Tales #112 (October 1963) created by Stan Lee and Dick Ayers, while his successor, Edward Lavell, first appeared in Power Man and Iron Fist #92 (April 1983). Both Eels were at one point members of the Serpent Squad even though the character they portray was not actually based on a snake, but on a fish that resembled a snake. Neither Eel has ever been featured as a regular character in any of Marvel's ongoing or limited series.

The original Eel, Leopold Stryke, wore a suit that could generate an electrical charge like an electric eel and was coated with a slippery substance. He was often depicted as a henchman, normally teaming up with other criminals such as Plantman, Porcupine, Scarecrow and Unicorn. He later became a founding member of the Serpent Squad along with his brother Jordan, the original Viper. He even worked for Madame Hydra, unaware that she had killed his brother. Stryke was killed by the Gladiator during a heist.

The second Eel, Edward Lavell, started out as a foe of Power Man and Iron Fist, but later became a general henchman like the original Eel working for Justine Hammer's Masters of Evil and the Maggia. At one point Lavall appeared to have been killed, but later appeared as part of the latest incarnation of the Serpent Squad led by Sin, the daughter of the Red Skull. Subsequently, Eel became part of "Serpent Solutions", the next incarnation of the Serpent Society.

== Publication history ==
The original Eel first appeared in Strange Tales #112 (September 1963), and was created by Stan Lee and Steve Ditko. The character subsequently appears in Strange Tales #117 (February 1964), Daredevil #6 (February 1965), Fantastic Four Annual #3 (1965), X-Men #22-23 (July–August 1966), Captain America #158-159 (February–March 1973), #163 (July 1973), #180-181 (December 1974-January 1975), Defenders #36-38 (June–August 1976), and Ghost Rider #21 (December 1976), in which he died. The character appeared posthumously in Alpha Flight Special Edition #1 (June 1992), Untold Tales of Spider-Man #11 (July 1996), and Marvel: Heroes and Legends #1 (October 1996). The original Eel received an entry in the Official Handbook of the Marvel Universe Deluxe Edition #17, and in the Official Handbook of the Marvel Universe Master Edition #2.

The second Eel first appeared in Power Man and Iron Fist #92 (April 1983) and was created by Kurt Busiek and Denys Cowan.

== Fictional character biography ==
=== Leopold Stryke ===
Eel

Publication information
- Publisher: Marvel Comics
- First appearance: Strange Tales #112 (Sept 1963)
- Created by: Stan Lee; Steve Ditko

In-story information
- Alter ego: Leopold Stryke
- Team affiliations: Maggia; Serpent Squad; Emissaries of Evil; Fellowship of Fear
- Abilities: Wears electrified lubricated costume Use of various weapons

Leopold Stryke was the first criminal known as the Eel. In Stryke's first appearances, he battled the Human Torch when he stole a nuclear device. Stryke was also a teammate of Plantman, the original Porcupine, the Scarecrow and the original Unicorn when they worked as henchmen for Count Nefaria. He was dispatched to battle the original team of X-Men. He then served as a henchman of the original Mister Fear, along with Ox, as part of the Fellowship of Fear.

Leopold and his brother Jordan, who was the original Viper, were later members of the original Serpent Squad. This first lineup battled Captain America. Leopold also aided the Serpent Squad in a plot to raise the continent of Lemuria. They battled the original Nomad and Namor the Sub-Mariner. When Madame Hydra reorganized the second Serpent Squad, Leopold remained unaware that she had murdered his brother and taken his alias.

Leopold Stryke is fatally mutilated in Las Vegas by the Gladiator, who was sent to acquire a disintegrator ray that Eel had in his possession.

=== Edward Lavell ===
Eel
- Cover art for Captain America (vol. 5) #28, the Eel is at the bottom left, art by Steve Epting

Publication information
- Publisher: Marvel Comics
- First appearance: Power Man and Iron Fist #92 (April 1983)
- Created by: Kurt Busiek; Denys Cowan

In-story information
- Alter ego: Edward Lavell
- Team affiliations: Serpent Squad; Maggia; Thunderbolts; Masters of Evil; Enforcers; New Enforcers; Serpent Society
- Partnerships: Nightshade
- Abilities: Wears electrified and lubricated costume

Edward Lavell is first seen attempting to break Hammerhead out of prison. He battles Power Man and Iron Fist. Later working with Nightshade, Eel is defeated again by Iron Fist and reformed criminals Discus and Stiletto.

In hopes of gaining revenge against the criminal Mister Hyde, Eel arranges a murder of a woman he had befriended, framing Hyde. Lavell also secretly impersonates "Snake" Marston, joining the Enforcers. Eel sucker-punches Daredevil and gloats of his plans, but the Enforcers overhear and turn on him. Eel is taken into court to clear Hyde's name and then remanded to custody.

Lavell was a member of Crimson Cowl's Masters of Evil, and is defeated by the Thunderbolts. After the Masters of Evil are apprehended, he was seen among the Maggia leaders assembled by the Grim Reaper who try to claim leadership of the scattered, fractious families on behalf of Count Nefaria. He is captured when the Avengers invade the meeting place.

During the Civil War storyline, Eel is apprehended by the Thunderbolts to serve in the so-called Thunderbolt Army. Following the disbanding of the Thunderbolt Army, Eel is among the villains who attend Stilt-Man's funeral.

Eel later appears as a member of a new Serpent Squad led by Sin, the daughter of the Red Skull. He participates in several murderous missions, including one intended to damage the Asian stock markets. He breaks Crossbones out of jail and later attacks the White House, but is stopped by the new Captain America.

During the Original Sin storyline, Eel is relaxing in his lounge alongside his goons when he receives an unexpected visit from Black Cat. Eel taunts her with the fallout from her capture by the Superior Spider-Man and then attacks her. Black Cat retaliates revealing her companion, Electro, who attacks Eel's goons while Black Cat taunts Eel saying that she will take everything from him. Mister Negative and Phil Urich are waiting for Eel to divide the criminal underground after Norman Osborn's downfall, but they are stunned by seeing Eel crashing into the place when Black Cat comes into view.

In All-New, All-Different Marvel, Eel appears as a member of the Serpent Society.

== Powers and abilities ==
Leopold Stryke designed the original Eel costume, which consisted of electrically superconducting fabric sandwiched in between body insulation and a layer of near-frictionless synthetic fabric. The Eel costume featured small devices capable of generating large and small bursts of electricity. It could fire electrical bolts (initially only through his suit's chest protector) and give off bright glows, as well as set up an electric current in the costume that would shock anyone touching it. The costume was coated with a greasy silicon substance (which was sometimes asbestos grease) that made it slippery. The costume could operate underwater. The battle suit also projects an electrical field which allows him to sense his surroundings, even in total darkness. Eel used various weapons, including a specially designed helicopter, an Aqua-Attractor gun, and an Eel-Cannon.
