= Unicorn (Marvel Comics) =

Name of several villains in Marvel Comics

- The Unicorn as featured on the cover of Iron Man #154 (Jan. 1982). Art by Bob Layton.

Publication information
- Publisher: Marvel Comics
- First appearance: Tales of Suspense #56 (Aug. 1964)
- Created by: Stan Lee (Writer); Don Heck (Artist)

In-story information
- Alter ego: Milos Masaryk
- Species: Human mutate
- Team affiliations: Lethal Legion; Maggia; KGB
- Partnerships: Count Nefaria; Plantman; Eel; Porcupine; Scarecrow; Red Ghost; Titanium Man; Mandarin
- Notable aliases: Uncanny Unicorn
- Abilities: Formidable hand-to-hand combatant and marksman; Highly proficient in the use of knives; Superhuman strength, stamina, and durability via radiation treatments; Flight via rocket belt; Energy projection, force field generation and magnetic levitation via emitter on brow of suit

The Unicorn is the name of several supervillains appearing in American comic books published by Marvel Comics.

== Publication history ==
The first Unicorn (Milos Masaryk) debuted in Tales of Suspense #56 (Aug. 1964) and was created by Stan Lee and Don Heck.

== Fictional character biography ==
=== Milos Masaryk ===
Milos Masaryk is a Soviet intelligence agent assigned to track down the original Crimson Dynamo, who had defected to the United States. Wearing technology designed by the Dynamo and calling himself Unicorn, Masaryk battles Iron Man, who defeats him. The Unicorn is among the villains affected by Doctor Doom's high-frequency emotion charger, compelling him to attack the Fantastic Four at the wedding of Reed Richards and Susan Storm.

The Unicorn allies with Count Nefaria and undergoes experimental conditioning to augment his powers. The process leaves Unicorn with "accelerated cellular deterioration", and he is taunted with a cure by the Red Ghost in exchange for assistance against Iron Man. Once it becomes evident that the Red Ghost has lied, the Unicorn aids Iron Man and later escapes.

The Mandarin makes a similar promise to the Unicorn and deploys him against Iron Man on two separate occasions, both ending in Unicorn's defeat. In the first instance, the Mandarin's consciousness becomes trapped in the Unicorn's body before being freed. Using the alias "The Other", the Titanium Man uses the Unicorn against Iron Man, who is finally able to capture him. However, Unicorn is left comatose.

Iron Man takes Masaryk to the Avengers Mansion, where Yellowjacket wakes Masaryk and cures him of his disease. The process drives Masaryk insane, causing him to inadvertently activate the hidden robot Arsenal. Unicorn is stunned by Arsenal and placed in stasis pending a cure for his mental illness.

Months later, Masaryk is freed when a fire breaks out at Stark Enterprises. He resumes the identity of the Unicorn and finds and attacks Iron Man once again. Still insane, the Unicorn refuses to believe that "The Other" was a lie, and begins to walk back to the Soviet Union via the ocean to find him. A severely weakened Iron Man watches as the Unicorn apparently drowns.

The Unicorn is revived by the Beyonder to fight with a new version of the Lethal Legion. The Unicorn is given a true third eye on a stalk with energy projection capabilities in lieu of a suit.

=== Yegor Balinov ===
A second unnamed (at the time of his debut) Unicorn with a developed tentacled eye within his power-horn appears as a member of Remont 4 and goes on a rampage in Saint Petersburg until captured by the third Titanium Man. His third eye is removed and he is incarcerated.

During the Civil War storyline, Unicorn is approached by Baron Zemo and forced to either join Zemo's team of Thunderbolts or go to jail. He chooses to join and fights on the team's behalf.

He is next seen in Hulk: Winter Guard along with Iron Maiden, Titanium Man, Volga, and the Snow Leopards as Remont 6.

This version's real name is revealed to be Yegor Balinov in Official Handbook of the Marvel Universe.

=== Aaidan Blomfield ===
A third Unicorn, Aaidan Blomfield, wore the same Unicorn costume as his predecessors, but with an actual horn on the helmet. He is recruited into the supervillain group Stockpile by Morgan Stark to destroy Iron Man, but they are defeated by the combined efforts of Iron Man and War Machine. Blomfield claimed to be an old foe of Iron Man's, but it is unknown if he really is, or was just riding on the reputation of the original Unicorn.

=== Unnamed criminal ===
Roderick Kingsley sells one of the Unicorn's outfits to an unnamed criminal, who becomes the fourth Unicorn. During the AXIS storyline, Unicorn is among the supervillains who ally with Phil Urich, claiming that Kingsley "abandoned" them. Kingsley later regains Unicorn's services.

== Powers and abilities ==
Originally, Unicorn had no superhuman powers; his helmet was the source of his abilities. However, Unicorn has undergone mutagenic radiation treatments which gave him superhuman strength and endurance. Unicorn's soft tissues are dozens of times harder than those of an ordinary human, making him highly resistant to physical injury. The process which endowed Unicorn with superhuman powers caused accelerated cellular deterioration, which eventually severely affected his sanity and physical health.

He wears headgear equipped with an energy projector that tunes to various frequency and power levels. This allows him to project concussive energy blasts (electron or neutron beams), lasers, and microwave energy. It also allows him to project a force field and to levitate objects magnetically. He also wears a rocket belt equipped with twin, high-efficiency electric micro turbines that allow him to fly; the belt also contains the power supply for his helmet which consists of an array of nuclear-powered thermo-electric cells. Unicorn also wears body armor of unknown composition.

Unicorn is a formidable hand-to-hand combatant, having received training in armed and unarmed combat by the KGB. He is proficient in the use of firearms, fluent in both English and Russian, and has received KGB training in intelligence techniques.

== Other versions ==
An unidentified alternate universe version of Unicorn appears in Ultimate Nightmare. This version was a convict who participated in an abandoned Russian super-soldier program involving Vision's biotechnology and went insane due to years of isolation. Additionally, he possesses a horn capable of projecting electricity, the ability to levitate, and enhanced durability. After being found by the Ultimates, Unicorn is killed by Nick Fury.

== In other media ==
- The Milos Masaryk incarnation of Unicorn appears in Iron Man: Armored Adventures, voiced by Michael Daingerfield. This version is an enforcer for the Maggia and Justin Hammer.
- A genderbent incarnation of Milos Masaryk / Unicorn named Mila Masaryk appears in Your Friendly Neighborhood Spider-Man, voiced by Sarah Natochenny. This version uses a helmet capable of shooting lasers and analyzing opponents' moves.
