= Stiletto (comics) =

Stiletto is the name of different characters appearing in American comic books published by Marvel Comics. The most popular is Tom Stuart who fought Heroes for Hire.

== Publication history ==
The Tom Stuart version of Stiletto first appeared in Hero for Hire #16 in Dec. 1973 and was created by Jenny Blake Isabella and Billy Graham.

== Fictional character biography ==
=== Tom Stuart ===
Stiletto

Publication information
- Publisher: Marvel Comics
- First appearance: Hero for Hire #16 (Dec. 1973)
- Created by: Jenny Blake Isabella; Billy Graham

In-story information
- Alter ego: Tom Stuart
- Partnerships: Justin Hammer; Discus
- Abilities: Wears wrist devices that shoot small blades Use of knives

Tom Stuart is the eldest son of Tyler Stuart, a warden at Seagate Prison. After Luke Cage escapes from Seagate Prison, Tyler loses his job and Tom seeks revenge. He obtains a costume and weaponry from Justin Hammer and becomes the criminal vigilante Stiletto. Stiletto attacks Cage, using explosive flechettes to destroy the building he is in. Using many different types of knives, Stiletto is able to hold his own against Cage, but is ultimately defeated.

Soon after, Stiletto begins working with his younger brother Tim, who becomes known as Discus. Tyler saves his sons from Cage, convincing him that he would handle the situation. Stiletto and Discus later ambush Cage during his exoneration. Cage's allies, Iron Fist and the Daughters of the Dragon, aided him in the battle, and soon Misty Knight and her partner, Rafael Scarfe, join in. Stiletto fires one of his stiletto blades at Scarfe, apparently killing him. In response, Knight attempts to kill Stiletto, but is stopped by Cage. It is revealed that the projectile Stiletto fired at Scarfe was blocked by his police badge, saving his life.

While in prison, Stiletto and Discus begin working for Deadly Nightshade. Along with Eel and Man Mountain Marko, Stiletto and Discus battle the Heroes for Hire during a robbery. After Nightshade's defeat, Stiletto and Discus surrender, no longer wanting to fight the heroes.

Stiletto rejoins forces with Nightshade, this time without his brother. Stiletto intends to kill Black Panther, but is thwarted by Luke Cage, Iron Fist, Falcon, and Black Goliath.

=== Francisco Araujo da Costa ===
Francisco Araujo da Costa is a Brazilian assassin who operated as Stiletto and fought Punisher.

== Powers and abilities ==
The Tom Stuart version of Stiletto has no superpowers but wields knives and shoots small blades from wrist devices.

== In other media ==
An original incarnation of Stiletto, amalgamated with Stilt-Man, appears in Moon Girl and Devil Dinosaur, voiced by Kari Wahlgren. This version is a shopaholic named Linh Pham who used her engineering skills to make "designer grade extendable heels". Following her introduction in the episode "The Beyonder", she helps found the Felonious Four in "Moon Girl, Grounded".
