= Emissaries of Evil =

Comic book supervillains

The Emissaries of Evil is a name used by three teams of supervillains appearing in American comic books published by Marvel Comics.

== Publication history ==
The first Emissaries of Evil debuted in Daredevil Annual #1 and were created by Stan Lee, Gene Colan, and John Tartaglione.

The second Emissaries of Evil debuted in Defenders #42 and were created by Gerry Conway and Keith Giffen.

The third Emissaries of Evil debuted in Daredevil #377 and were created by Scott Lobdell and Tom Morgan.

== Fictional character biography ==
=== Electro's Emissaries of Evil ===
Emissaries of Evil

Publication information
- Publisher: Marvel Comics
- First appearance: Daredevil Annual #1 (1967)
- Created by: Stan Lee; Gene Colan; John Tartaglione

In-story information
- Leader(s): Electro
- Member(s): Gladiator; Leap-Frog; Matador; Stilt-Man

The first Emissaries of Evil is recruited by Electro in a plot of revenge against Daredevil for previous defeats, and consists of Electro, Gladiator, Matador, Stilt-Man, and Leap-Frog. Electro establishes his headquarters in one of the city's power plants. Daredevil happens across Electro meeting with Matador and attacks the two, but Electro attacks him and flees with Matador. Electro then instructs Gladiator, Stilt-Man, Leap-Frog, and Matador to wait in different parts of the city for Daredevil to show up. Later, as part of Electro's plan, Matador follows Daredevil and ambushes him, but Daredevil easily overcomes him and the other villains. After being defeated, the villains return to Electro's hideout. When Daredevil arrives, the Emissaries of Evil conduct a final assault on Daredevil. Daredevil defeats all of the villains, then subdues them with a lasso.

=== Egghead's Emissaries of Evil ===
Emissaries of Evil

Publication information
- Publisher: Marvel Comics
- First appearance: Defenders #42 (December 1976)
- Created by: Gerry Conway; Keith Giffen

In-story information
- Base(s): Orbiting NASA space station
- Leader(s): Egghead
- Member(s): Cobalt Man; Eel; Porcupine; Power Man; Rhino; Solarr; Swordsman

The second Emissaries of Evil was formed by Egghead and consists of Rhino, Solarr, Eel, Porcupine, Power Man, and Swordsman. Egghead builds a nuclear device and hijacks airwaves worldwide, threatening to launch the device towards New York City unless he is made the President of the United States. James Hudson and the Flight see Egghead's broadcast and rush into action to stop the Emissaries of Evil. Even with little training, the Flight quickly takes out the Emissaries of Evil before confronting Egghead. Egghead refuses to disable the nuclear device, forcing Saint Elmo to sacrifice himself to transmute it into energy.

Egghead equips a NASA space station with an arsenal of weapons and reforms the Emissaries of Evil. This iteration consists of Rhino, Solarr, and Cobalt Man, who had been brainwashed by Egghead. Egghead then sends the Emissaries of Evil to attack the Defenders and obtain a ruby called the Star of Capistan. After Rhino and Solarr fail to retrieve the Star, Cobalt Man is sent to deal with the Defenders. Cobalt Man is freed from brainwashing by Clea and Red Guardian, while Rhino and Solarr are defeated by Doctor Strange. Egghead attempts to take on the Defenders on his own, but Cobalt Man attacks Egghead, seemingly killing them both.

=== The Kingpin's Emissaries of Evil ===
Emissaries of Evil

Publication information
- Publisher: Marvel Comics
- First appearance: Daredevil #377 (August 1998)
- Created by: Scott Lobdell; Tom Morgan

In-story information
- Leader(s): Kingpin
- Member(s): La Concierge; Stilt-Man; Synapse

The third Emissaries of Evil is assembled by Kingpin and consists of La Concierge, Stilt-Man and Synapse. Daredevil (whose memories had been reprogrammed by S.H.I.E.L.D. to pose as undercover agent Laurent Levasseur) ends up fighting the Emissaries of Evil while undercover. During a battle with the Kingpin and his henchmen, Levasseur regains his memories. Kingpin and the Emissaries of Evil attempt to frame a Middle Eastern man for terrorism in a bid to claim a shipment of weapons, but Daredevil successfully defends the man in court. Daredevil takes on the Emissaries of Evil to foil Kingpin's scheme and manages to defeat them.
