= Porcupine (character) =

Fictional characters in Marvel Comics

- Porcupine

Publication information
- Publisher: Marvel Comics
- First appearance: Tales to Astonish #48 (October 1963)
- Created by: Stan Lee (writer); Don Heck (artist)

In-story information
- Alter ego: Alexander Gentry
- Species: Human
- Team affiliations: United States Army; Lethal Legion; Maggia
- Abilities: Skilled automotive mechanic Porcupine suit grants: Enhanced strength and durability Razor-tipped quill-like surface Short-distance flight via belt jets Wide variety of offensive and defensive weapons

Porcupine is the name used by two fictional characters appearing in American comic books published by Marvel Comics: Alexander Gentry, a weapons designer who uses his porcupine battlesuit in an attempt to become wealthy through crime, as one of the first costumed professional criminals of his generation, and Roger Gocking, a criminal who purchased the suit to commit crimes, before joining the Thunderbolts and reforming, joining Ben Urich and Jessica Drew as a private investigator, and as nanny to the latter's son Gerry, before eventually coming to date Jessica himself.

The Alexander Gentry incarnation of Porcupine appeared in the Marvel Cinematic Universe (MCU) series She-Hulk: Attorney at Law, portrayed by Jordan Aaron Ford.

== Publication history ==
The first Porcupine, Alexander Gentry, first appeared in Tales to Astonish #48 (October 1963) and was created by Stan Lee and Don Heck.

The second Porcupine, Roger Gocking, first appeared in Daughters of the Dragon #3 (May 2006) and was created by Justin Gray, Jimmy Palmiotti, and Khari Evans.

== Fictional character biography ==
=== Alexander Gentry ===
Alexander Gentry was originally a scientist who worked as a weapons designer for the United States Army. He conceived the idea of designing a battlesuit in imitation of a porcupine: it would be covered with quill-like projections for defense. Moreover, it would be able to shoot its quills, or gases, flames, chemicals, paralysis-inducing pellets, or weapons from quill-like tubes, at an opponent. Gentry spends months working overtime to create his porcupine battlesuit. He is proud of his achievement when the suit was finished, and believes his invention is worth a fortune. Yet Gentry also believes that the government would pay him, one of its employees, virtually nothing for his creation. Angrily, Gentry decides to keep the porcupine battlesuit and to use it to become wealthy through crime. Thus Gentry became the Porcupine, one of the first costumed professional criminals of his generation. Hank Pym, the Ant-Man, and his partner, Janet van Dyne, the Wasp, soon defeat the Porcupine when he attempts to rob a bank. However, the Porcupine escapes. After Pym had also assumed the superhuman powers and identity of Giant-Man, Porcupine returns for revenge. During the resulting battle, the Porcupine consumes what he thinks is a Giant-Man growth serum, but which instead shrinks him to microscopic size. Eventually, the capsules' effect wore off, and the Porcupine, again at his normal size, is among the many costumed menaces assembled by Doctor Doom to disrupt the wedding of Reed Richards and Susan Storm.

His self-confidence still shaken by his failures in battling Giant-Man and the Wasp, the Porcupine eagerly accepts the invitation of Count Nefaria, a powerful figure in the criminal Maggia, to join his group of costumed agents. Among Nefaria's agents are Plantman, the original Eel, the original Unicorn, and the Scarecrow, all of whom the Porcupine would ally himself with in the future as well. The Porcupine and the other costumed agents aid Count Nefaria in his attempt to hold much of Washington D.C. for ransom. However, the X-Men thwart Nefaria and his agents. Once again, the Porcupine escapes being taken prisoner, and he blames the failure of the blackmail scheme on Nefaria and the other agents. Gentry comes to suspect that in fact he himself was inadequate for the role of being a "super-villain" battling superhuman opponents.

Porcupine enlists as a member of Batroc's Brigade. As a Brigade member, the Porcupine unsuccessfully battles Captain America. Months later, the Porcupine and his allies, Plantman, the original Eel and the Scarecrow, go to work for the masked criminal mastermind the Cowled Commander on his crime spree. Once again, the Porcupine clashes with Captain America and is defeated.

Convinced that they are failures, Gentry and Leopold Stryke, the original Eel, seek guidance from the Celestial Mind Control movement, which is secretly masterminded by the alien Nebulon. Nebulon pits the Porcupine and the Eel against his foes, the Defenders, who defeat them both.

Later, the Porcupine and a small group of confederates invade a major Manhattan hotel to steal the valuables in its safe. The Porcupine decides to rob the wealthy attendees at a fashion show in one of the hotel's ballrooms. The show is being given by Janet van Dyne. Hank Pym, who now uses the costumed identity of Yellowjacket, is also present, as is Kyle Richmond, the adventurer Nighthawk. The heroes swiftly defeat the criminals. Porcupine feels humiliation at being taken down by opponents the size of insects.

Tired of his long string of defeats, Gentry decides to give up his career as a costumed criminal and live off the millions of dollars he expects to receive by selling his battlesuit. Gentry redesigns his battlesuit, making it far deadlier than before. He enters into negotiations with the subversive organization called the Secret Empire to sell them the suit. The Empire requests proof of the battlesuit's capabilities, so Gentry attempts to prove it in battle against Captain America. Captain America and his ally Nomad defeat the Porcupine, and Gentry is returned to jail.

Porcupine later joins a short-lived version of the Lethal Legion in their mass-attack on New York's superheroes. He is knocked aside by a thrown printer and hit by a stray blast from Unicorn.

Gentry then tries to sell the suit to A.I.M., Hydra, the Kingpin, the Maggia, the Tinkerer, and finally to the Serpent Society, but almost no one wants it, and the few offers he does receive for it are insultingly low. Despairing, Gentry comes up with the idea of selling the battlesuit to the Avengers to prevent it from falling into the hands of their enemies. Captain America is intrigued when Gentry mentions he contacted the Serpent Society, whom Captain America has been trying to bring to justice. Captain America agrees to have the Avengers buy the battlesuit if Gentry helps get him to members of the Serpent Society. Gentry accepts Captain America's terms. Captain America's plan is for Gentry to pretend to have captured him and offer the Serpent Society the opportunity to kill him. Gentry contacts the Society and arranges to have some of their members meet him at a lower Manhattan construction site. When the trap is sprung, in the ensuing melee Gentry trips and inadvertently impales himself fatally on one of his quills. Captain America has Gentry buried in a grave reserved by the Avengers for those who have fallen in battle and puts his battlesuit on exhibit in Avengers Mansion, labeled "Battle Armor of the Porcupine – Honored Foe of the Avengers".

Porcupine later appears as a witness for Trapster's lawsuit against Tinkerer. During the in-court brawl, She-Hulk notices Porcupine and reminds him that he is supposed to be dead. Realizing She-Hulk is right, Porcupine drops dead.

=== Roger Gocking ===
Porcupine

Publication information
- Publisher: Marvel Comics
- First appearance: Daughters of the Dragon #3 (May 2006)
- Created by: Justin Gray; Jimmy Palmiotti; Khari Evans

In-story information
- Alter ego: Roger Gocking
- Species: Human
- Team affiliations: Thunderbolts
- Partnerships: Spider-Woman
- Abilities: Porcupine suit grants: Minimal resistance to injury Helmet with a 6 hour air supply and night vision lenses Flight via boot jets Ability to fire 3 bombs/knock out gas bombs at once

Roger Gocking using the Porcupine identity and battle armor appears in Daughters of the Dragon #3. Porcupine and other villains are attacked by Colleen Wing and Misty Knight, who were seeking information in the bar. Porcupine is quickly felled and thrown into Doctor Bong.

During the Civil War event, he is apprehended alongside Eel in San Francisco by the three rookie Beetles and their leader, MACH-IV. This group forms Thunderbolts Team A.

The Porcupine appears again in Thunderbolts #107 alongside the likes of the Eel, Doctor Octopus, Boomerang, Whirlwind and others who in separate teams of the new Thunderbolts face massive hordes of empowered people. These were everyday people empowered by an out-of-control cosmic source of energy called the Universal Well Spring.

During Doctor Doom's war with Wakanda over their vibranium supplies, Porcupine is employed by former Damage Control worker Walter Declun in Mexico to defend one of Doctor Doom's outposts there from the Dora Milaje and the Fantastic Four.

Porcupine then begins attending Super Villain Anonymous meetings held in the basement of St. Jude's Church. Sometime later, Porcupine is forced into committing crimes for his ex-wife, Olivia, who had retreated to a safe haven for physically and emotionally battered women because she could not take the stress of Roger's lifestyle. She uses their daughter, Kalie, as a hostage to force his compliance. After his loved ones are located, Gocking decides to reform and begins traveling across the United States, solving crimes with Spider-Woman and Ben Urich. Once Spider-Woman's baby Gerry is born, Roger also becomes his nanny.

Hoping to sever his criminal ties, Porcupine asks Hobgoblin to release him from his franchise contract and let him buy the Porcupine equipment outright. Instead, Hobgoblin tries to kill Porcupine with a Pumpkin Bomb so that he could use his equipment for future franchisees. Roger happens to be wearing one of Spider-Woman's high-tech pregnancy outfits, enabling him to survive the bomb, and he begins a relationship with Spider-Woman. The two continue looking after Gerry, who they discover also has Spider-Woman's powers.

== Powers and abilities ==
The original Porcupine wielded a self-made battle armor composed of steel and advanced plastics that enhanced his strength and durability. The armor is equipped with a wide variety of offensive and defensive weapons built in. The outer surface of the armor is covered with razor-tipped metal quill-like projections which can be fired at opponents. The armor's other capabilities include laser beams, concussive bombs, small rockets, tear gas, sleeping gas, smoke screens, acetylene torch flames, liquid cement, wheels giving off hypnotic lights, and high voltage blasts of electricity. The suit included belt jets which allowed him to fly for short distances. Gentry was a skilled automotive mechanic and had a master's degree in engineering.

The second Porcupine's armor gives him some resistance to physical and energy attacks. The helmet has a 6-hour air supply and night vision lenses. The quills do damage when striking opponents. His boot jets allow him to fly for up to 10 minutes. The Porcupine can fire three bombs or three knock out gas bombs at once.

Billy's offensive morphing power allowed him to sprout razor tipped spikes from his face, body, and right arm. These spikes were retractable, distorting the skin tissue to appear as acne. He could fire these spikes as projectile bolts with lethal force. Billy could also distort his left arm into a misshapen, extended form with elongated fingers and claws.

== In other media ==
The Alexander Gentry incarnation of Porcupine appears in the She-Hulk: Attorney at Law episode "The Retreat", portrayed by Jordan Aaron Ford. This version is a participant in Summer Twilight, a meditation retreat run by Emil Blonsky.
