= Gladiator (Melvin Potter) =

Comic book character

- The Gladiator by Alex Maleev

Publication information
- Publisher: Marvel Comics
- First appearance: Daredevil #18 (July 1966)
- Created by: Stan Lee (writer); John Romita Sr. (artist)

In-story information
- Alter ego: Melvin Potter
- Team affiliations: Emissaries of Evil; Maggia
- Abilities: Accomplished clothing designer Superb martial artist Peak physical condition Wears thick metal armor Possesses arsenal of edged weapons

Gladiator (Melvin Potter) is a fictional character appearing in American comic books published by Marvel Comics. Potter was initially depicted as a supervillain and one of the first enemies of the superhero Daredevil. In civilian life, he is a costume designer at the Spotlight Costume Shop in New York City. He eventually reformed and became a consistent supporter of Daredevil.

Potter was portrayed by Matt Gerald in the streaming television series Daredevil, set in the Marvel Cinematic Universe (MCU).

== Publication history ==
Gladiator first appeared in Daredevil #18 (July 1966), and was created by Stan Lee and John Romita Sr.

== Fictional character biography ==
Melvin Potter is a costume designer who delusionally believes that he was far better than any superhero. To prove his point, he designs a suit of battle armor for himself, complete with deadly wrist blades, and becomes known as the Gladiator. During his first criminal outing, he battles Daredevil before encountering his recurring enemy, the Masked Marauder. Gladiator later appears in Europe, where he fights Daredevil again and joins the Maggia. Eventually, he joins Electro's Emissaries of Evil to attack Daredevil once again. Gladiator has one last battle against Daredevil before deciding to reform. He attends therapy with Betsy Beatty, whom he later marries.

Potter is forced into working for Alexander Bont, who claims that Potter had a four-year-old daughter who he had never met and that she would die if Potter did not help. Gladiator brings Murdock to Bont, who attempts to kill Murdock, but instead dies of a drug-induced heart attack. Gladiator is defeated by White Tiger and goes back to prison.

In prison, Gladiator is accused of murdering two fellow inmates. Matt Murdock's law firm defends him after Murdock's super-senses indicate that he is telling the truth about his innocence. After being taunted by another inmate, Gladiator snaps his handcuffs and assaults the inmate and a corrections officer, only to surrender to another officer. Gladiator embarks on a rampage in Chinatown, killing civilians and culminating in an attack on Murdock and Milla Donovan.

After this incident, Potter realizes the weight of his actions and attempts suicide, only to be saved by Daredevil. Potter is taken back to prison and heavily sedated after repeatedly banging his head against the wall. Separately, it was revealed that Mr. Fear had secretly administered chemicals to Potter that caused him to go insane with rage.

== Powers and abilities ==
Gladiator has no superhuman abilities. However, he is a superb martial arts fighter and is very physically powerful. As a villain, he wore thick metal armor with a helmet and metallic gauntlets. He was armed with an arsenal of edged weapons and whirling, jagged circular sawblades made of titanium, one mounted on each gauntlet. Small rotors in the gauntlets cause the blades to rotate at high speeds, and the whirling blades could also be detached to serve as short-range missile weapons.

In civilian life, Potter is an accomplished clothing designer, proficient in drafting, design and sewing.

== In other media ==
- Melvin Potter appears in Daredevil, portrayed by Matt Gerald. This version is an inventor who was forced by Wilson Fisk to make protective suits for him. Upon learning of this, Matt Murdock convinces Potter to make him a suit in exchange for ensuring Fisk cannot threaten him anymore. In the third season, Fisk forces Potter to make a replica of Murdock's suit for Benjamin Poindexter to frame Murdock as a criminal. Potter later attempts to corroborate the lie, but is arrested for violating his parole and assaulting federal agents.
- Melvin Potter appears in the Daredevil novel Predator's Smile, written by Christopher Golden.
