= Iron Man: Enter the Mandarin =

2007 comic book limited series

- Cover art to Iron Man: Enter the Mandarin #1. Art by Eric Canete.

Publication information
- Publisher: Marvel Comics
- Schedule: Monthly
- Format: Limited series
- Genre: Superhero
- Publication date: November 2007 – May 2008
- No. of issues: 6
- Main character(s): Iron Man; The Mandarin

Creative team
- Written by: Joe Casey
- Artist: Eric Canete

Collected editions
- Iron Man: Enter the Mandarin: ISBN 0-7851-2622-8

Iron Man: Enter the Mandarin is a 2007 comic book limited series published by Marvel Comics. Written by Joe Casey with art by Eric Canete, the series is a retelling of Iron Man's first encounter with the Mandarin. The original version of the story appeared in Tales of Suspense #50 (February 1964).

== Plot ==
Stark Industries CEO Tony Stark is called into a special S.H.I.E.L.D. conference. They want his "bodyguard" Iron Man to perform a deep cover reconnaissance mission on a Chinese warlord who has been exerting undue influence over the political climate. Iron Man flies to the Mandarin's castle and navigates through a gauntlet of security devices. After being discovered by the Mandarin, the two fight, ending with a critically injured Iron Man barely managing to escape.

As Iron Man heals, the Mandarin's underling hires Ebenezer Laughton to attack Tony Stark, giving him the identity of the Scarecrow. That evening, the Scarecrow breaks into Stark Industries and is defeated by the recovering Iron Man.

The Mandarin takes control of Stark's elite S.H.I.E.L.D. satellite and plans to use it against the West. Iron Man once again infiltrates the Mandarin's headquarters, which nearly results in his death. Iron Man confronts the Mandarin a third time and though he has the upper hand, the Mandarin breaks away from the battle and launches the satellite at Beijing. Iron Man stops the satellite, deflecting it away from Earth, but when he returns to the Mandarin's compound, the villain is nowhere to be found.

== Reception ==
Iron Man: Enter the Mandarin was generally well received. Joseph Szadkowski of The Washington Times lauded Casey's writing style and use of pacing. Alan Kistler of ComicMix.com included Enter the Mandarin among his "10 Must-Read Stories Before You Watch 'Iron Man' in Theaters."

== Collected editions ==
The story is collected in the trade paperback Iron Man: Enter the Mandarin (ISBN 0785126228).
