= Synapse (character) =

Synapse is the name of two characters appearing in American comic books published by Marvel Comics. The first Synapse, Max Mullins, first appeared in Daredevil #377 (July 1998) and was created by Scott Lobdell and Tom Morgan. The second Synapse, Emily Guerrero, was introduced as a new member of the Avengers Unity Squad. She first appeared in Uncanny Avengers Vol. 3 #1 (December 2015) and was created by Gerry Duggan and Ryan Stegman. Both incarnations of Synapse possess telepathic abilities. The Max Mullins incarnation can alter the minds of others, while the Emily Guerrero incarnation can manipulate others' nervous systems and control their bodies.

== Fictional character biography ==
Synapse
- Synapse as depicted in Daredevil #378 (August 1998). Art by Tom Morgan (penciler), Scott Hanna (inker), and Christie Scheele (colorist).

Publication information
- Publisher: Marvel Comics
- First appearance: Daredevil #377 (July 1998)
- Created by: Scott Lobdell (writer); Tom Morgan (artist)

In-story information
- Alter ego: Max Mullins
- Species: Human mutate
- Team affiliations: Emissaries of Evil
- Partnerships: La Concierge
- Abilities: Telepathy

=== Max Mullins ===
Max Mullins has the ability to rewire and alter a person's brainwaves to his liking. Taking on the name Synapse, he, along with La Concierge and Stilt-Man, is recruited by the Kingpin to form the third incarnation of the Emissaries of Evil. Synapse temporarily shuts down Stilt-Man's brain so that he will not reveal his employer's name to Daredevil, who at the time was acting as an agent for S.H.I.E.L.D. and had his mind wiped to think he was Laurent Levasseur.

Tired of being pushed around, Synapse plans on using his powers on the Kingpin, but the Kingpin, who had a stronger mind, knew of Synapse's plot and threatens to kill him if he does not continue to work under him. Eventually, the Kingpin has Synapse use his powers on Laurent, but it instead reminds him that he is Daredevil. He knocks out Synapse with one kick.

=== Emily Guerrero ===
Synapse

Publication information
- Publisher: Marvel Comics
- First appearance: Uncanny Avengers (vol. 3) #1 (December 2015)
- Created by: Gerry Duggan (writer); Ryan Stegman (artist)

In-story information
- Alter ego: Emily Guerrero
- Species: Inhuman
- Team affiliations: Uncanny Avengers
- Abilities: Superhuman strength Enhanced speed Telepathy; Animal control

Emily Guerrero lived with her younger brother and grandfather, Ivan, when the Terrigen Mist cloud affected their area. Emily and Ivan both had their latent Inhuman abilities activated, with Ivan becoming a villain called the Shredded Man.

Emily later joins the Avengers Unity Squad under Captain America's leadership. Despite Emily being new, Steve Rogers has faith in her, even though she and teammate Rogue do not get along very well.

== Powers and abilities ==
The Max Mullins incarnation of Synapse possesses telepathy, which he uses to rewire and alter a person's brainwaves to his liking.

The Emily Guerrero incarnation of Synapse possesses telepathy which enables her to influence the minds of others, including animals. She also possesses superhuman strength and speed.
