= Man Mountain Marko =

Marvel Comics supervillain

- Man Mountain Marko as depicted in The Amazing Spider-Man #73 (June 1969). Art by John Romita Sr.

Publication information
- Publisher: Marvel Comics
- First appearance: The Amazing Spider-Man #73 (June 1969)
- Created by: Stan Lee (writer); John Romita Sr. (artist)

In-story information
- Alter ego: Michael Marko
- Species: Human
- Team affiliations: Maggia; Sinister Six
- Abilities: Superhuman strength, stamina and sturdiness

Man Mountain Marko (Michael Marko) is a supervillain appearing in American comic books published by Marvel Comics. Marko was and remains an affiliate of numerous organized-crime entities in the Marvel universe, including the Maggia.

He was allied with Silvermane, Caesar Cicero, Eel, and Nightshade. His most frequent enemies are Spider-Man, Power Man, Iron Fist, Thunderbolt, and Boomerang. He appears to have no relation to Cain Marko, seen in various Marvel titles as the Juggernaut, despite similarities in surname, physique and superpowers.

== Publication history ==
Man Mountain Marko first appeared in The Amazing Spider-Man #73 and created by Stan Lee and John Romita Sr.

== Fictional character biography ==
Marko is first seen as Silvermane's loyal lieutenant in an incident dealing with an ancient tablet which he steals. He attacks Curtis Connors when he thinks the formula he created has killed Silvermane. Marko is quickly defeated by Spider-Man.

While gathering protection money, Marko has a breakdown and trashes a bar with Spider-Man inside. Investigative reporter Ben Urich tells Spider-Man that Marko has apparently kidnapped a child. Ben knows of a facility where Marko is known to work out. Spider-Man finds steroids in Marko's locker. The owner of the gym tells him that the Maggia genetically altered Marko to make him stronger. Spider-Man steals information from the Maggia and confronts Marko at his home. Eventually Marko is subdued and it turns out the child he 'kidnapped' simply had a twisted sense of hero worship, admiring Marko's size and strength.

Marko is later seen as a sexually threatening hitman sent after private investigator Jessica Jones. This was part of a conspiracy by a powerful business magnate who wished to use Jones and Captain America to humiliate the President of the United States. Jones severely beats Marko, then literally throws him at the businessman's feet. Marko and his bosses are arrested by S.H.I.E.L.D.

During the "Manifest Destiny" storyline, Marko develops a singing career focusing on the concept of violence against female super-heroes. While on a plane with the super-hero Dazzler he becomes enraged over the perceived lack of alcohol. He injures passengers and takes a hostage, he breaks the hostage's wrist to prove he is serious. Dazzler, at low power, manages to subdue him.

During the "Dark Reign" storyline, Marko is sent by Norman Osborn as part of a fact finding mission to an 'Atlas' facility run by a younger Jimmy Woo. Atlas is an international crime organization that is working against the government's interests. Marko is working as the head of a squad of B.A.T.F.E. government agents. Marko's forces include a seeming snitch that had been advising the government on the activities of Atlas. Marko, against the recommendations of his guides, rushes off the recommended path to follow the snitch, who is revealed to be Jimmy Woo. Before Marko can do anything about the situation, he is eaten by the dragon Lao.

Marko is revealed to have survived and is hired onto the Sinister Sixteen by Boomerang and Owl. After being manipulated and abandoned by Boomerang, Marko seeks revenge on him with the help of Cyclone, Shriek, and Kangaroo, but the quartet are defeated by Boomerang and his allies.

In "All-New, All-Different Marvel", Marko is hired by Lorraine Monroe to stand guard over Tempest Monroe, the comatose fiancé of Spider-Man 2099. Upon discovering Tempest's whereabouts, Spider-Man 2099 distracts Marko long enough for Parker Industries to covertly relocate Tempest. Spider-Man 2099 subsequently tracks Marko down and beats him to near-death. Marko is recovered by the Fist, an offshoot of the Hand, who heal him and further augment his strength and durability.

== Powers and abilities ==
Man Mountain Marko has been shown to have superhuman strength, stamina, and sturdiness roughly comparable to, if not slightly exceeding, those of Spider-Man. It has been said that this is a result of steroids and genetic manipulation.

Marko received a power upgrade after getting a vicious beating from Spider-Man 2099. Though Spider-Man had previously broken many of Marko's bones, afterward Spider-Man was unable to do any damage to Marko.

== Relatives ==
During the "Fear Itself" storyline, it is revealed that Man Mountain Marko had a cousin named Man Mountain Mario who was an inmate at the Raft. After the destruction of the Raft prison by Juggernaut, Man Mountain Mario helps defend Crossbones from thugs. While the two of them were trying to escape, Mario told Crossbones about his grandma, who helps criminals leave the border. Crossbones manages to escape from the Raft and returns the favor for Mario helping him by killing Mario to help with his escape.

== Other versions ==
A possible future version of Man Mountain Marko from Earth-982 appears in the Marvel Comics 2 imprint. This version is the head of the Maggia in New York. He later appears in the series Spectacular Spider-Girl as an underling for the Maggia's new leader.

== In other media ==
Man Mountain Marko appears in the Spider-Man episode "Wrath of the Sub-Mariner", voiced by Jack Angel. This version is Silvermane's henchman.
