= Maggia (comics) =

Fictional organization

Publication information
- Publisher: Marvel Comics
- First appearance: The Avengers #13 (February 1965)
- Created by: Stan Lee; Don Heck

In-story information
- Type of organization: Organized crime
- Agent(s): Full list

The Maggia is a fictional international crime syndicate appearing in American comic books published by Marvel Comics. The organization exists in Marvel's main shared universe, known as Earth-616, as well as other Marvel universes. Its structure is somewhat similar to the real-world New York Mafia (which is itself rarely mentioned in Marvel publications), but the Maggia differs in that it frequently hires supervillains and mad scientists to work for them. Some of the Maggia's prominent members are supervillains themselves, such as Hammerhead, Silvermane, Count Nefaria and his daughter Madame Masque. The Maggia has come into conflict with various superheroes, including Spider-Man, Daredevil, the Fantastic Four, the X-Men, and the Avengers.

Comics scholar Brian Cronin has suggested that the Maggia were created to avoid offending the real-life Mafia, as some comic book distributors in the 1960s had Mafia ties. Writer Ed Brubaker has stated that the organization's renaming to "the Maggia" was part of a Marvel policy of referencing the real world but "one step removed", similar to their fictional company Roxxon being inspired by the real-life Exxon.

Since their debut in comics, the Maggia have been adapted into several other forms of media, including television series and video games. The Maggia appeared in the second season of the Marvel Cinematic Universe (MCU) series Agent Carter, with their Los Angeles branch led by Joseph Manfredi (portrayed by Ken Marino).

== Publication history ==
The different Maggia families. Attribution unknown, artist Jack Kirby.

The Maggia first appeared in The Avengers #13 (February 1965) and was created by Stan Lee and Don Heck.

== Fictional organization history ==
The Maggia is an international crime syndicate that is the world's most powerful organization dedicated to conventional crime (as opposed to subversive activities). Originating in southern Europe, the Maggia spread throughout non-Communist Europe and the Americas. The Maggia in the 13th century was under the influence of Satannish. Its presence in the United States first came to public attention in the 1890s, and the Maggia's widespread bootlegging of illegal liquor during the Prohibition era has become legendary. Today the Maggia controls most of the illegal gambling, loan-sharking, and narcotics trade in the United States, as well as many legal gambling casinos in Atlantic City, New Jersey and Las Vegas, Nevada. It also has great influence within various labor unions, and controls politicians on every level of government. Especially in recent years, the Maggia has invested many of its illegal gains into legitimate businesses. However, the Maggia enforces a strict code of secrecy among its members, and does not hesitate to punish betrayals and failures with death. The Maggia is not a monolithic organization but is instead a coalition of many virtually independent groups known as "families." The leading members of each family are usually connected through familial or marital ties. The Maggia also has affiliations with other criminal groups such as the Morgan organization in New York City's Harlem.

It was revealed that Bushmaster became the leader of the Maggia's European branch.

With Bruno Karnelli's terrible leadership, the loss of Silvermane, Count Nefaria pursuing his own agenda, and Hammerhead siding with Mister Negative, the Maggia is thrown into chaos until Mysterio appears and uses robot duplicates of the dead Maggia members. When the Hawkeyes Kate Bishop and Clint Barton attempted to make a difference in the lives of everyday people by fighting organized crime, several New York crime families, including the Maggia, struck back against them.

During the "Gang War" storyline, Count Nefaria visits Hammerhead's group after hearing about what happened to Madame Masque. While mentioning that he will take the blame for what happened to her daughter, Nefaria tells Hammerhead that the other crime lords will bow to the Maggia once again. The Maggia are shown to be assisting Hammerhead in running Astoria. Having defeated Hammerhead and revealed to still be alive, Masque takes control of the Maggia.

== Maggia families ==
Several "families" are based in the New York City area. Three of these families have come to pre-eminence:

=== Silvermane family ===
Its leader is Silvio "Silvermane" Manfredi, one of the last of the legendary gangsters who came to notoriety during the 1920s and 1930s. This group conducts its activities along traditional Maggia lines, and is heavily involved with the narcotics trade. Silvermane uses unusual scientific means only for the personal goal of staving off his own death, and not for the family's activities. Although Silvermane has a son, Joseph, also known as Blackwing, his successor as family head will probably be his longtime rival, top Maggia lawyer Caesar "Big C" Cicero. Silvermane initially retained control of his organization after being turned into a cyborg, but most recently his failing health, in both human and cyborg bodies, have left him a figurehead leader at best.

The following characters have been members of the Maggia's Silvermane family:

- Silvio "Silvermane" Manfredi – Leader of the Silvermane family.
- Blackie – Rank unknown. First appeared in The Amazing Spider-Man #75.
- Caesar Cicero – The Silvermane family's lawyer. First appeared in The Amazing Spider-Man #73.
- Man Mountain Marko (Michael Marko) – Silvermane's top lieutenant. First appeared in The Amazing Spider-Man #73.
- Rapier – A one-time friend and partner of Silvermane named Dominic Tyrone, who sought revenge after being betrayed. Rapier used an electro-stun rapier as his main weapon. First appeared in The Spectacular Spider-Man Annual #2. Killed by Scourge of the Underworld.

=== Hammerhead family ===
Dominated by middle-aged Maggia traditionalists, this family first became notorious under unusual circumstances. Perhaps in imitation of the Nefaria family, its leader known as the "Top Man" outfitted his family hit men with costumes and advanced weaponry. He then gained ownership of the Baxter Building through questionable means, thinking that doing so would somehow give him legal title to the technology of the building's famed occupants, the Fantastic Four. The Fantastic Four defeated and captured the "Top Man", his claims to owning the Baxter Building were dismissed by the courts, and the "Top Man" was reportedly assassinated by order of his own family. The family then sought a new leader who would direct operations along thoroughly traditional lines and chose a newcomer known only as Hammerhead, an amnesia victim whose new ruthless persona had been shaped by his love for gangster films. Hammerhead uses methods from the Prohibition era, including gang wars, although he will use advanced technology for personal ends, such as the exoskeleton that magnifies his strength. In light of Hammerhead's recent loyalty shift to Mister Negative, the status of his Maggia family remains undetermined. They usually ally with Tombstone and the Chameleon.

The following characters have been members of the Maggia's Hammerhead family:

- Top Man – Former leader of the Hammerhead family. First appeared in Fantastic Four #101 (Aug 1970). Assassinated by an unknown member of his Maggia group.
- Hammerhead – Second leader of the Hammerhead family. First appeared in The Amazing Spider-Man #113 (Oct. 1972).
- Big Rock – Rank unknown. First appeared in Fantastic Four #101 (Aug. 1970).
- Blackwing (Joseph Manfredi) – The son of Silvermane. Rank unknown. First appeared in Daredevil #118 (Feb. 1975).
- Eel (Edward Lavell) – One-time employee and representative of the Maggia's Gulf Coast operations. First appeared in Power Man and Iron Fist #92 (April 1983).
- Gimlet – The Top Man's lieutenant who aspired to become the next Top Man. First appeared in Fantastic Four #101 (Aug. 1970).
- Tombstone (Alonzo Thompson "Lonnie" Lincoln) – An albino crime lord who typically works independently from the Maggia, but has allied with them on occasion. He briefly usurped leadership from Hammerhead in The Spectacular Spider-Man #204.

=== Nefaria family ===
This group bears little resemblance to the rest of the Maggia. The Italian nobleman Count Luchino Nefaria, a scientific genius, was the world's most powerful Maggia leader until his initial defeat by the Avengers. Afterwards, he moved his base of operations to the New York City area, and then imprisoned Washington, D.C. within an impenetrable force-dome and held it for ransom. After his defeat and capture, his daughter Giulietta, also known as Whitney Frost, succeeded him as family head and led an unsuccessful attempt to capture the advanced weaponry of Tony Stark. She was eventually succeeded by a costumed criminal, the Masked Marauder, who demanded complete control of New York City or else he would detonate a nuclear device there. After his capture, the family again apparently came under control of Whitney Frost, by then known as Madame Masque. Contrary to standard Maggia practice, the Nefaria family, principally consisting of men under 40, has employed futuristic weaponry and even robots (like the Dreadnoughts), as well as costumed super-powered agents (Unicorn, Whiplash, Gladiator, etc.), and has launched open attacks on society. Its leader is always known as "Big M". With Count Nefaria and Masque now pursuing separate agendas, it is not known who, if anyone, currently heads the Nefaria Family.

The following characters have been members of the Maggia's Nefaria family:

- Count Luchino Nefaria – Founder of the Nefaria family. First appeared in Avengers #13 (Feb. 1965)
- Cyclone (André Gerard) – First appeared in The Amazing Spider-Man #143 (April 1975). Killed by Scourge of the Underworld.
- Eel (Leopold Stryke) – Former agent. First appeared in Strange Tales #112 (Sept. 1963). Killed by Gladiator.
- Madame Masque / Whitney Frost (Giulietta Nefaria) – Head of the Nefaria family and daughter of Count Nefaria. First appeared in Tales of Suspense #97 (Jan. 1968).
- Gladiator (Melvin Potter) – Former member. First appeared in Daredevil #18 (July 1966).
- Daniel Lindy – First appeared in Peter Parker, The Spectacular Spider-Man #22 (Sept 1978).
- Masked Marauder (Frank Farnum) – Former leader of the Nefaria family. First appeared in Daredevil #16 (May 1966).
- Plantman (Samuel Smithers) – Former agent. First appeared in Strange Tales #113 (Oct 1963).
- Porcupine (Alexander Gentry) – Former agent. First appeared in Tales to Astonish #48 (Oct. 1963). Died in battle against Diamondback.
- Scarecrow (Ebenezer Laughton) – Former agent. First appeared in Tales of Suspense #51 (March 1964).
- Tri-Man – An android created by the Masked Marauder that copies the abilities of three low-level crooks. First appeared in Daredevil #22.
- Unicorn (Milos Masaryk) – Former agent. First appeared in Tales of Suspense #56 (Aug. 1964).
- Whiplash (Mark Scarlotti) – Former enforcer. First appeared in Tales of Suspense #97 (Jan. 1968).

=== Costa family ===
The Costa family is associated with the Maggia and was responsible for the death of Frank Castle's family, which led to Castle becoming the Punisher. At one point, they used William Russo (a.k.a. Jigsaw) as an enforcer and hitman.

The following members are seen in the Costa family:

- Luis Allegre – Member of the Costa family. First appeared in Marvel Super Action #1. Killed by the Punisher.
- Bruno Costa – Enforcer of the Costa family and brother of Frank Costa. First appeared in Marvel Preview #2. Killed by Frank Costa's assassin Audrey.
- Byron Hannigan – Member of the Costa family. First appeared in Marvel Super Action #1. Killed by the Punisher.
- Leon Kolsky – Member of the Costa family. First appeared in Marvel Super Action #1. He was killed when the Punisher tricked him into firing on an aquarium tank that contained a shark.
- Matt Skinner – Member of the Costa family. First appeared in Marvel Super Action #1. Killed by the Punisher.

=== Fortunato family ===
The Fortunato family are strong opposers of Wilson Fisk who came in conflict with Spider-Man.

The following members are seen in the Fortunato family:

- Don Vincente Fortunato – The patriarch of the Fortunato family. First appeared in Spider-Man #70.
- Jimmy-6 (Giacomo Fortunato) – The son of Don Fortunato and his top enforcer. First appeared in Spider-Man #70.
- Angelo Fortunato – The youngest son of Don Fortunato, who briefly became the host for Venom. First appeared in Marvel Knights: Spider-Man #7. Killed when he fled from a battle with Spider-Man and was abandoned by the Venom symbiote for his cowardice.

=== The Karnelli family ===
The Karnelli family is one of the Maggia's composing crime families. They once had a marriage that united their family with the Silvermane family.

The following members are seen in the Karnelli family:

- Bruno Karnelli – The leader of the Karnelli family. First appeared in Amazing Spider-Man #547.
- Ando Karnelli – Member of the Karnelli family. First appeared in Amazing Spider-Man #547.
- Carmine Karnelli – An adoptive member of the Karnelli family. First appeared in Amazing Spider-Man #547. He was killed in Amazing Spider-Man #619.
- Joe Karnelli – Member of the Karnelli family. First appeared in Amazing Spider-Man #618.
- Robert "Bobby" Karnelli – Member of the Karnelli family. First appeared in Amazing Spider-Man #547. He was mentioned in Old Man Logan (vol. 2) #43 to have been killed by Bullseye after being driven into a murderous frenzy by Old Man Logan.
- Vincenzo Karnelli – Member of the Karnelli family. First appeared in Amazing Spider-Man #618.

=== Nobili family ===
The Nobili family is a struggling Maggia family. Several members of the family are descendants of the Inhumans.

The following members are seen in the Nobili family:

- Lineage (Gordon "Gordo" Nobili) – The patriarch of the Nobili family. First appeared in Thunderbolts (vol. 2) #14.
- Carmen Nobili – The son of Gordon Nobili. First appeared in Thunderbolts (vol. 2) #14. Killed during the fight against the Paguro family.
- Joseph Nobili – The son of Gordon Nobili. First appeared in Thunderbolts (vol. 2) #14. Killed during the fight against the Paguro family.

=== Libris family ===
The Libris family is a crime family that specializes in counterfeiting, extortion, gambling, gun sales, and union shakedowns. They no longer take part in the drug business after their leader's daughter O.D.'d on drugs.

The following members are seen in the Libris family:

- Isabelle Libris - The alleged crime boss of the Libris family. First appeared in Daredevil (vol. 6) #7. She was killed in Daredevil (vol. 6) #33.
- Lavinia "Lavita" Libris - The crime boss of the Libris family during the 1970s. First appeared in Daredevil (vol. 6) #8.

=== Other Maggia members ===
The following members do not fall under the category of the other five Maggia families:

- Bobby Peculo – First appeared in Punisher: No Escape #1. Killed by the Punisher.
- Bushmaster (John McIver) – First appeared in Iron Fist #15. He was killed when the process that gave Luke Cage his powers proved to be too much for him.
- Chic DiAngelo - A Maggia crime lord who was behind the experiments that led to the origins of Cloak and Dagger and Mister Negative. First appeared in Power Pack #6.
- Cyclone (Pierre Fresson) – He served as a speaker for the European branches of the Maggia. First appeared in Thunderbolts #3.
- Eli Rumsford – Enforcer. First appeared in Spectacular Spider-Man #54 (May 1981)
- Gideon Mace – First appeared in Heroes for Hire #3.
- Goldbug – One-time employee. First appeared in Power Man #41.
- Grim Reaper (Eric Williams) – First appeared in Avengers #52.
- Guido Carboni – A crime boss. First appeared in Marvel Spotlight #20 where he was depicted as a big time crime boss who held operations all across New York. One night, a cat burglar named Monty Walsh attempted to rob him, but Guido and his men shot and killed him as he was trying to escape. Unbeknownst to Guido and his men, Monty was saved by the Uni-Power and became Captain Universe. Guido found his operations falling apart due to Monty's use of the power. Guido was finally confronted by Monty, who planned to kill him and then use the power for his own selfish needs; unfortunately for Monty, the Uni-Power left him because of this and Guido was arrested by the police, raving about how a dead body had superpowers.
- Harry Dumont – First appeared in Spectacular Spider-Man #54 (May 1981)
- Joey Tartaglione - A Maggia family member who operated out of Ellis Island and assisted in obtaining runaways for Chic DiAngelo and Simon Marshall's experiments that led to the origins of Cloak and Dagger and Mister Negative. First appeared in Peter Parker, The Spectacular Spider-Man #64. He and his men were tricked into running out a high window to their deaths by Cloak.
- Mind-Master – Ruffio Costa is a crime lord who once kidnapped Robert Mallory's son Keith. First appeared in Daredevil Annual #4.
- Mysterio (Quentin Beck) – First appeared in The Amazing Spider-Man #13.
- Nautilus – An enforcer from Chicago. First appeared in Spider-Man Unlimited #6.
- Photon (Jason Dean) – First appeared in a crossover story in Nova #12 and Amazing Spider-Man #171. He was responsible for murdering Nova's uncle Ralph Rider.
- Razorwind – An enforcer from Chicago. First appeared in Spider-Man Unlimited #6.
- Shigeru Ichihara – A Maggia member who handled all Maggia activities on the Pacific Rim. First appeared in Avengers (vol. 3) #31.
- Simon Marshall – A Maggia chemist who Chic DiAngelo used in the experiments that played a part in the origins of Cloak and Dagger and Mister Negative. Marshall is later killed by Cloak and Dagger.
- Smuggler (Erik Josten) – First appeared in Avengers #21 (Oct. 1965)
- T.B. Smithson – A Maggia member who controls all Maggia activities in Texas. First appeared in Avengers (vol. 3) #31.
- Tapping Tommy – First appeared in Defenders #30.
- Trapster (Peter Petruski) – First appeared in Fantastic Four #38. He was a member of the Maggia in Thing #4.
- Vic Slaughter – Assassin. First appeared in Morbius the Living Vampire #6.
- Vincent Mangaro – A crime boss who set up a drug-dealing operation in New York. First appeared in Punisher: No Escape #1. Killed by the Punisher.

== Competitors and allies ==
Although the Maggia is, for the most part, analogous in the Marvel Universe to the real-life Italian and Italian-American Mafia or La Cosa Nostra, there have been several organizations in Marvel publications that more closely resemble the real-life Mafia. Some of these groups have been referred to as "the Mafia" in recent comics, but it is unknown whether or not they operate under the fictional Maggia organization or are part of a separate, more realistic Mafia organization. These more realistic Italian Mafia groups are often featured in Punisher comics. As most of these organizations operate on a crew-based street level and specialize in traditional organized crime rather than superpowered organized crime, it is possible they are not connected to the more powerful Maggia. Examples of these organizations include:

- Angelone family
- Gnucci family – It was known for the infamous Ma Gnucci.
- Pazzo family
- Roman family

== Other versions ==
=== House of M ===
In the House of M reality, the Maggia is a criminal organization that was led by Count Nefaria. The Maggia were annihilated by Magneto's Sentinels for plotting against him.

== In other media ==
=== Television ===
- The Maggia appears in the Iron Man (1994) episode "Beauty Knows No Pain", led by Madame Masque.
- The Maggia appears in Iron Man: Armored Adventures, led by Count Nefaria and consisting of Black Knight, Unicorn, and Killer Shrike. This version of the group are rivals of the Mandarin's gang, the Tong.
- The Los Angeles branch of the Maggia appears in the second season of Agent Carter, led by Joseph Manfredi.

=== Film ===
The Maggia appears in the Spider-Man: Far From Home prequel short film Peter's To-Do List.

=== Video games ===
- The Maggia appears in Iron Man (2008). This version of the group is a weapons manufacturing company and former partner of Stark Industries. When Tony Stark announces that his company will no longer be producing weapons, the Maggia attempt to seek revenge, but Iron Man cripples their production capabilities and forces them into bankruptcy. In an article for IGN, game director Jeffrey Tseng explained that adapting the Iron Man film script into a game was the perfect opportunity to include characters and groups from Iron Man's history to fill it out. He declared "...we were looking through Iron Man's history to find characters and groups that would resonate with dedicated fans. [The] Maggia, Advanced Idea Mechanics, Titanium Man, and other characters in the game all came from this extensive research."
- The Maggia appears in Marvel: Avengers Alliance.
- The Maggia appears in Marvel Heroes. This version is led by the Kingpin.
- The New York branch of the Maggia appears in the Spider-Man downloadable content The City That Never Sleeps, consisting of the Fortunato, Costa, Cicero, Mauchio, and Hammerhead families. Following the arrests of the Kingpin and Mister Negative, the five Maggia families attempt to fill the power vacuum left in the city and engage in a violent gang war. Hammerhead tries to force the other families to submit to him before he is defeated by Spider-Man and Silver Sable.
