= Hammerhead (character) =

- Hammerhead as depicted in pin-up art of The Spectacular Spider-Man Annual #3 (January 1981). Art by James Sherman

Publication information
- Publisher: Marvel Comics
- First appearance: The Amazing Spider-Man #113 (October 1972)
- Created by: Gerry Conway (writer); John Romita Sr. (artist)

In-story information
- Alter ego: Joseph (surname unknown)
- Team affiliations: Maggia; Sinister Twelve
- Notable aliases: Mr. H
- Abilities: Criminal mastermind; Skilled marksman and hand-to-hand combatant; Adamantium implants grants: Superhuman strength and durability; Impenetrable skull

Hammerhead is a supervillain appearing in American comic books published by Marvel Comics. Created by Gerry Conway and John Romita Sr., the character first appeared in The Amazing Spider-Man #113 (October 1972) and has since endured as a recurring adversary of the superhero Spider-Man.

Hammerhead is typically portrayed as a stereotypical mobster who dresses and speaks in a 1920s style. He is known for his short temper and for his affiliation with the Maggia, a fictional organized crime syndicate similar to the real-life Mafia. His nickname stems from the steel alloy that replaced most of his skull after a failed murder attempt, giving his head a flat shape and near-indestructibility. The Hammerhead crime family, of which he is the second and current head, is named after the character.

As a well-known enemy of Spider-Man, the character has appeared in several media adaptations, including animated series and video games. In 2014, IGN ranked Hammerhead as Spider-Man's 20th greatest enemy.

== Publication history ==
Hammerhead made his first appearance in The Amazing Spider-Man #113 (October 1972), and was created by writer Gerry Conway and artist John Romita Sr.

Conway recalled that Hammerhead "was most directly influenced by the Big Man and the Crime-Master, who were among the first villains in Amazing Spider-Man. One of the more interesting things Stan [Lee], Jack Kirby, and, of course, Steve Ditko did was combining the two different kinds of milieus: superhero and Dick Tracy, with the unusual criminal characters who had some kind of physical deformity... Plus, Hammerhead—I liked [the] name, and John Romita came up with an interesting look".

== Fictional character biography ==
Hammerhead's family immigrated from the Soviet Union to Italy when he was a child with help from a man known only as the General. His father ran a garage in Toirrano, where he insisted the young man speak only in Russian, beating him severely with a mallet when he would not. Although not much is known about his life before he became a criminal and supervillain, Hammerhead is known to be married and has a sister named Antonia.

All the while, Hammerhead dreamed of becoming a gangster. He is eventually recruited into one of the "families" of the criminal organization known as the Maggia when a member oversees Hammerhead "making his bones" by murdering a childhood bully and his girlfriend in a theater showing The Godfather Part II. Originally a small-time hitman, Hammerhead quickly rises through the ranks of the Maggia, while pretending to be ethnically Italian so he can be "made". In his final test, Hammerhead is brought to his father's garage (with the Maggia apparently unaware of their relationship). Hammerhead proceeds to kill his father, while saying in Russian that he blames his villainy on his father's abuse.

One day, Hammerhead was found beaten, disfigured, and delirious with pain in an alley in New York City's Bowery by Jonas Harrow, a surgeon who had lost his medical license due to his illegal experiments. Seeing the opportunity both to save this man's life and to redeem his reputation, Harrow operated on the gunman for three days, replacing much of his shattered skull with a strong steel alloy. During the surgery, the unconscious thug fixated on the only memory he retained: an image of a poster for a movie called "The Al Capone Mob", which was hanging in the alley where he lay beaten and bloodied before Harrow found him. When he recovered, the memory of the poster and its images of 1930s-era gangsters prompted Hammerhead to start a gang of his own in the style of Capone and other mobsters of the 1920s. He even dressed as if he were living in that decade.

A gang war broke out between Hammerhead's mob and Doctor Octopus's criminal organization. Hammerhead was forced to flee the country due to Spider-Man's interference. He later had a rematch with Doctor Octopus next to an atomic breeder reactor on a remote Canadian island which caused a chain reaction, blasting Hammerhead "out of phase" with this dimension. Some time later, he appeared as an immaterial ghost-like being to haunt Doctor Octopus. Doctor Octopus then unwittingly used a particle accelerator to restore Hammerhead to his corporeal form. Hammerhead kidnapped Spider-Man's Aunt May, who was then rescued by Spider-Man as Doctor Octopus caused Hammerhead's helicopter to plummet into the Hudson River.

Hammerhead then proposed that all Maggia families unite under his leadership. Wearing a strength-enhancing exoskeleton, he battled the Human Torch, who then fused the exoskeleton's power pack. Hammerhead was nearly assassinated by the Kingpin's minion the Arranger during a gang war. Despite surviving the assassination, Hammerhead was ultimately forced out of a major role in New York City organized crime by the Kingpin.

Hammerhead then allied himself with the Chameleon in the latter's bid to become the new crime lord of New York City. The two served as partners in a splinter group of the Maggia. Hammerhead hired Tombstone as a bodyguard and hitman. He hired the Hobgoblin to kill Joe Robertson, who posed a threat to Tombstone; the assassination attempt failed. Hammerhead was kidnapped and beaten by Tombstone, who had gained superhuman powers and resented Hammerhead for not sending him to kill Joe Robertson.

Hammerhead later attended a Las Vegas crime conference to divide the resources left by the Kingpin's downfall at the time. Around this time, he participates in a multi-sided gang-war focused on the Kingpin's attempt to re-take New York City for his own.

Hammerhead is a major player in underworld activities in the Marvel Universe and is highly sought after for elimination by the Punisher. He becomes one of several gang warlords struggling to control the criminal underworld in the major cities of the Eastern United States. During one of the first meetings of such warlords, Hammerhead was almost killed by the Strucker twins. This meeting was being manipulated by Baron Strucker, the head of Hydra. When Don Fortunato made a bid for control of the New York underworld, Hammerhead opposed him and was almost killed as a result. When every other crime lord surrendered to Fortunato and his Hydra allies, Hammerhead went rogue, launching a raid on Fortunato's home and successfully fighting off a Hydra attack on his own headquarters.

During the events of the "Civil War", Hammerhead used the vacuum left by the incarceration of the Kingpin to gain a greater foothold in the ranks of organized crime, attempting to organize an army of villains to enforce his new criminal empire. When Slyde balked at the idea, Hammerhead had Underworld kill him to serve as a warning to anyone who did not join up with him. The Kingpin manipulated various hero factions, most notably S.H.I.E.L.D. and Iron Man, into breaking up Hammerhead's first convening of his army. During the conflict, Hammerhead was shot numerous times by Underworld, who was revealed to be working for the Kingpin. Underworld later confronted Hammerhead while he lay in prison and shot him at point-blank range with adamantium bullets.

The bullets, while not penetrating his skull, did cause severe trauma to his brain, resulting him in needing surgery, but the hospital he was brought to was unable to treat him. During the surgery, men working for the Kingpin's rival Mister Negative come in, kill the hospital staff, and take Hammerhead away. Negative has his surgeon Doctor Trauma revive Hammerhead and offers to transplant his brain into a new robotic adamantium skeleton, which Hammerhead agrees to.

The operation is a complete success, and Hammerhead is restored to full mobility without any ill effects. He swears loyalty to Mister Negative in exchange for his restored life and proceeds to shape a gang of lowlife thugs into an effective army for his benefactor. He then proceeds to battle Spider-Man, besting him with no effort for the first time in years. Later, he has a rematch with Spider-Man, with Spider-Man dislocating Hammerhead's hip bone.

Mister Negative sends Hammerhead to help Spider-Man (who Negative corrupted) take down the Hood, who launches an attack on Negative's headquarters. He blackmails H.A.M.M.E.R. director Norman Osborn into forcing the Hood to pull out of Chinatown.

Hammerhead begins to doubt his loyalty to Mister Negative when Silvermane, a deceased former Maggia don and an old enemy of the Kingpin, appears to return. Unknown to Hammerhead, "Silvermane" is actually an android controlled by Mysterio to plant seeds of rebellion. Nevertheless, he flees a shootout with the Maggia when the Silvermane robot calls him a traitor. It is shown that Negative had a computer chip put in Hammerhead's head to deliver an electroshock when necessary, which he promptly uses to punish him and remind him who is in charge.

During the Origin of the Species storyline, Hammerhead and Mister Negative are among the supervillains invited by Doctor Octopus to join his supervillain team, promising them that they will receive a reward in exchange for securing some specific items for him.

Hammerhead is among the crime lords who attend the wedding of Randy Robertson and Janice Lincoln. Shotgun crashes the wedding and shoots Tombstone, causing a massive gang war over his territory.

== Powers and abilities ==
Hammerhead has no superhuman abilities, yet his skull is now surgically reinforced with vibranium (or secondary adamantium), making his head flat on top; with this, he can charge and break through objects such as brick walls without causing any pain or damage to himself. This metal can absorb physical impacts that would otherwise fracture human bone. Hammerhead is in peak physical condition comparable to that of an Olympic-level athlete. He is a formidable hand-to-hand combatant whose most dangerous tactic is charging head first like a bull toward an opponent. Hammerhead once utilized a strength-enhancing exoskeleton designed by the Tinkerer.

After an assassin's adamantium bullet penetrated a part of his head not protected by his adamantium skull, Hammerhead is surgically rebuilt by Mister Negative. Breakout surgeries replace the upper half of his skeleton with an adamantium endo-skeleton (the skeleton is shown to have a network of hydraulic servomechanisms). The upper portion of his body is now superhumanly strong as a result of the additional hidden cybernetic musculature, making him able to effortlessly beat a superpowered foe such as Spider-Man. Mister Negative does not use on Hammerhead the same Lord Dark Wind bonding process, used on the similarly empowered Wolverine and Lady Deathstrike for coating their bones in adamantium: instead he replaces Hammerhead's bones with replicas fashioned in the invulnerable metal. It is still unknown how his artificial skeleton can carry on biological functions.

The intervention of Mr. Negative also radically changed Hammerhead's personality. Hammerhead now recalls his life as a Russian immigrant prior to the accident in which he adopted the 1920s gangster persona. Consequently, Hammerhead no longer speaks like a 1920s gangster, but instead behaves as a typical modern Russian mobster and hitman, as this was apparently his original personality prior to his head injury.

Hammerhead is highly skilled in the organization, concealment and management of criminal enterprises. He is an effective hitman, a skilled marksman (his preferred weapon was the Thompson submachine gun), and an excellent street fighter. In his original incarnation, Hammerhead was able to hold his own against Spider-Man despite being an ordinary human by using his superhumanly durable skull as a blunt instrument. After his recent augmentation, he is now capable of grappling with and physically overpowering Spider-Man to the extent that he could eventually crush his foe.

== Reception ==
- In 2022, Screen Rant included Hammerhead in their "10 Spider-Man Villains That Are Smarter Than They Seem" list.
- In 2022, CBR.com ranked Hammerhead 10th in their "10 Most Violent Spider-Man Villains" list.

== Other versions ==
=== Age of Ultron ===
An alternate universe version of Hammerhead from Earth-61112 makes a minor appearance in Age of Ultron #1.

=== Earth-001 ===
An alternate universe version of Hammerhead from Earth-001 makes a minor appearance in "Spider-Verse" as one of Verna's Hounds.

=== House of M ===
An alternate universe version of Hammerhead from Earth-58163 makes a cameo appearance in "House of M".

=== Marvel Zombies ===
An alternate universe version of Hammerhead makes a minor appearance in Marvel Zombies vs. The Army of Darkness.

=== Ultimate Marvel ===
An alternate universe version of Hammerhead from Earth-1610 appears in Ultimate X-Men. This version is a mobster named Joseph.

=== Ultimate Universe ===
An alternate universe version of Hammerhead from Earth-6160 makes a minor appearance in Ultimate Spider-Man.

== In other media ==
=== Television ===
- Hammerhead appears in the Spider-Man (1981) episode "Wrath of the Sub-Mariner", voiced by William Boyett.
- Hammerhead appears in Spider-Man: The Animated Series, voiced by Nicky Blair. The metal implanted in this version's head is adamantium, and he initially serves Silvermane before being fired by him and hired by the Kingpin, whom Hammerhead serves loyally for the rest of the series.
- Hammerhead appears in The Spectacular Spider-Man, voiced by John DiMaggio. This version is more cool-headed and intelligent and wields brass knuckles. Additionally, he originally worked for Silvermane and was in a romantic relationship with his daughter, Sable Manfredi, before they broke up and Hammerhead became an enforcer for Tombstone. Throughout the series, Hammerhead acts on Tombstone's behalf by manufacturing supervillains to distract Spider-Man from Tombstone's operations. However, Tombstone eventually becomes fed up with Hammerhead's failures and begins conducting business without him. While contacting Norman Osborn to create another supervillain, Hammerhead becomes inspired to betray his boss. Secretly calling for a Valentine's Day summit between Tombstone, Silvermane, and Doctor Octopus, Hammerhead attempts to manipulate the assembled crime bosses into killing each other. However, Spider-Man foils his plan by getting all of the bosses arrested, leading Tombstone to fire Hammerhead.
- A Marvel Noir-inspired incarnation of Hammerhead appears in the Ultimate Spider-Man episode "Return to the Spider-Verse", voiced by Jon Polito. This version is a crime boss and rival of Joe Fixit who previously employed Martin Li.
- Hammerhead appears in Spider-Man (2017), voiced by Jim Cummings.

=== Video games ===
- Hammerhead appears in Spider-Man (1995).
- Hammerhead appears as a boss in Spider-Man 2: Enter Electro, voiced by Dee Bradley Baker. This version is an underling of Electro.
- Hammerhead appears as boss in Spider-Man: Mysterio's Menace.
- A Marvel Noir-inspired incarnation of Hammerhead appears as a boss in Spider-Man: Shattered Dimensions, voiced again by John DiMaggio. While he does not appear in the original Marvel Noir comics, the developers felt "he would be a perfect fit for the Noir universe". Born Joseph Lorenzini, this version was born with a deformed head and a flat, thick skull. He initially worked as a circus freak under the nickname "The Human Bulldozer" before being recruited by Norman Osborn to serve as his gang's loan shark and enforcer. After being sent to New Jersey to retrieve a fragment of the Tablet of Order and Chaos and running afoul of Spider-Man Noir, Hammerhead uses the fragment to merge himself with his twin Tommy guns, intending to overthrow Osborn as New York's ruling crime boss. Ultimately, Spider-Man Noir defeats him and claims the Tablet fragment.
- Hammerhead appears as a boss in Marvel: Avengers Alliance.
- Hammerhead appears as a boss in the mobile version of The Amazing Spider-Man 2, voiced by Dave Boat. This version is a gang leader and rival of Kraven the Hunter.
- Hammerhead appears as a playable character and boss in Lego Marvel Super Heroes 2. This version is a gang boss in Manhattan Noir.
- A Venom symbiote-infected Hammerhead appears as a playable character in Spider-Man Unlimited.
- Hammerhead appears as a boss in the Spider-Man (2018) downloadable content The City That Never Sleeps, voiced by Keith Silverstein. This version, whose real name is Joseph Martello, is a notorious crime boss in New York City who leads one of the five Maggia families and has history with police captain Yuri Watanabe. Following the power vacuum created by the Kingpin's and Mister Negative's arrests, the Maggia become embroiled in a gang war for supremacy, during which Hammerhead attempts to force the other families to submit to him. When that plan fails due to Black Cat betraying him, Hammerhead turns himself into a cyborg using technology stolen from Silver Sable, only to be defeated by her and Spider-Man.

=== Miscellaneous ===
Hammerhead makes a minor appearance in Spider-Man: Turn Off the Dark.
