= Don Fortunato =

Publication information
- Publisher: Marvel Comics
- First appearance: Spider-Man #70 (July 1996)
- Created by: Howard Mackie; John Romita Jr.

In-story information
- Alter ego: Vincente Fortunato
- Team affiliations: Maggia; Hydra

Altered in-story information for adaptations to other media
- Notable aliases: Wesley Chang

Vincente Fortunato is fictional character appearing in American comic books published by Marvel Comics. An elderly crime boss affiliated with the Maggia and Hydra, he is usually depicted as an enemy of the superhero Spider-Man, and a competitor to the Kingpin.

== Publication history ==
The character first appeared in Spider-Man #70 (July 1996), and was created by Howard Mackie and John Romita Jr.

== Fictional character biography ==
Don Fortunato is a crime boss who took over a power vacuum left behind during the Kingpin's absence from New York. His elder son Giachomo is present at a meeting where Fortunato demonstrates his power. Fortunato intends to execute Tombstone and a group of civilians. Giachomo, horrified at his father's intentions, attempts to attack him with a gun. However, he and Fortunato are both stopped by Spider-Man (Ben Reilly) and Daredevil.

The Kingpin eventually returns to New York and re-assumes control of its criminal underground. Nitro attacks Fortunato on the Kingpin's orders, leaving him comatose. Giachomo is seen leading Fortunato's organization for several months afterward. Later, Fortunato obtains the Venom symbiote at an auction. Fortunato's younger son Angelo bonds with Venom, but it rejects him and allows him to fall to his death.

== In other media ==
Don Fortunato appears in the Spider-Man DLC "The City That Never Sleeps" as the leader of the Maggia.
