= Electro (Marvel Comics) =

Marvel Comics fictional character

- Artwork for the Timeless variant of Miles Morales: Spider-Man #5 (April 2019). Art by Alex Ross

Publication information
- Publisher: Marvel Comics
- First appearance: Max Dillon: The Amazing Spider-Man #9 (February 1964); Francine Frye: The Amazing Spider-Man vol. 3 #2 (July 2014); As Electro: The Amazing Spider-Man vol. 4 #17 (October 2016)
- Created by: Max Dillon: Stan Lee; Steve Ditko; Francine Frye: Dan Slott; Humberto Ramos; R.B. Silva

In-story information
- Alter ego: Maxwell "Max" Dillon; Francine Frye
- Species: Human mutate
- Team affiliations: Sinister Six; Emissaries of Evil; Frightful Four; Exterminators; Sinister Twelve; Legion Accursed
- Notable aliases: Mr. and Mrs. Electro; Master of Electricity; Jolt
- Abilities: Electricity manipulation; When fully charged: Superhuman strength, speed, and healing; Flight

Electro (/ɪˈlɛktroʊ/) is the alias of two supervillains appearing in American comic books published by Marvel Comics.

Created by writer Stan Lee and artist Steve Ditko, the first and best-known version of Electro is Maxwell "Max" Dillon, who first appeared in The Amazing Spider-Man #9 (1964) and has since endured as one of the superhero Spider-Man's most recurring enemies, belonging to the collective of adversaries that make up his rogues gallery. In the Marvel Universe, Max Dillon is a lineman who gains the ability to generate and control electricity after being struck by lightning. He turns to crime as the self-proclaimed "Master of Electricity", and has undergone several design changes throughout his comic book appearances. Electro's original design comprised a green-and-yellow costume with a lightning bolt-shaped mask, while modern stories depict him with blue skin and a bald head. Electro is a founding member of the Sinister Six, and the leader of the original incarnation of the Emissaries of Evil, the first supervillain teams to oppose Spider-Man and Daredevil, respectively.

Created by Dan Slott, Humberto Ramos, and R.B. Silva, the second Electro is Francine Frye, who first appeared in The Amazing Spider-Man vol. 3 #2 (2014). After being accidentally killed by Dillon, she is revived by Ben Reilly and similarly accidentally kills Dillon, absorbing his powers as a side effect of Reilly's resurrection method. Over the follow years from 2016 to 2021, Frye served as a solo Electro in a green-and-yellow costume; on Dillon's revival, the two independently continued to serve as Electro. In the series The Spectacular Spider-Man, Dillon and Frye battle over the name Electro, culminating in the two falling in love and vowing to marry.

Outside of comics, both Dillon and Frye have been featured in various media adaptations of Spider-Man, including feature films, television series, and video games. Most notably, Jamie Foxx portrayed Dillon in the live-action films The Amazing Spider-Man 2 (2014) and Spider-Man: No Way Home (2021).

== Publication history ==
Electro's first appearance, The Amazing Spider-Man #9 (Feb. 1964). Art by Steve Ditko.

The Max Dillon incarnation of Electro was created by Stan Lee and Steve Ditko, and first appeared in The Amazing Spider-Man #9 (Feb. 1964). The character is also known as the member of the Frightful Four battling the Fantastic Four. He is also the first major Marvel villain to be written in publication history as battling Daredevil, even being the founder and leader of the supervillain team that oppose him, the Emissaries of Evil.

The second incarnation of Electro, Francine Frye, was created by Dan Slott, Humberto Ramos, and R.B. Silva, and first appeared in The Amazing Spider-Man vol. 3 #2 (July 2014) by Slott and Ramos, though she did not become Electro until The Amazing Spider-Man vol. 4 #17 (October 2016) by Slott and Silva.

== Fictional character biography ==
=== Max Dillon ===
Max Dillon, as he originally appears. Interior artwork from Amazing Spider-Man Annual#1 (October 1964). Art by Steve Ditko.

While Maxwell "Max" Dillon, an electrical engineer and lineman, is repairing a power line, a freak lightning accident causes a mutagenic change that transforms him into a living electrical capacitor. His powers are initially weak, so he spends some time stealing electrical equipment from Stark Industries to charge himself. During this time, he is approached by Magneto, who considers him a potential recruit for his Brotherhood of Evil Mutants, claiming that Dillon's power rival his own, but Dillon refuses. The following day, Dillon is confronted by a small-time thug from whom he was borrowing money to pay for the machinery he needed. When the thug draws a gun on him because he did not pay back the money yet, he responds by shooting a blast of lightning through the thug's chest—the first time Dillon ever kills anybody.

Soon taking the name "Electro", he turns to a life of a professional crime, his first victim being J. Jonah Jameson. Electro breaks into the Daily Bugle Building and steals from Jameson's safe in front of him. Jameson accuses Spider-Man of being an alternate identity of Electro, prompting Spider-Man to prove the publisher wrong. During their first confrontation, Spider-Man is nearly killed after touching Electro. Spider-Man eventually uses a fire hose to short-circuit Electro while wearing rubber gloves to protect himself.

Electro next confronts Daredevil for the first time when trying to break into the Baxter Building. He is again defeated. Electro later joins the original Sinister Six led by Doctor Octopus, and is the first member of the group to fight Spider-Man, battling him at a Stark plant. Spider-Man enters the fight believing he lost his powers, however after dodging a bolt of electricity from Electro he realizes his powers returned. Electro loses his power when the power is cut off by Spider-Man, who gets a card from him that leads him to fight Kraven the Hunter. Electro attacks the Fantastic Four at the wedding of Sue Storm and Reed Richards, under the influence of Doctor Doom's mind-control machine, but he has no memory of this due to the actions of Mister Fantastic. He later recruits the Emissaries of Evil in a plot of revenge against Daredevil for previous defeats.

Electro is later hired by J. Jonah Jameson to defeat Spider-Man on national television. He encounters Daredevil again in San Francisco, at which time he temporarily dons a modified costume. Electro later joins the Frightful Four. As part of the Frightful Four, he uses Spider-Man as bait to trap the Fantastic Four. Subsequently, he battles the Falcon but is defeated, partly because he does not consider the Falcon to be a serious threat. Chameleon and Hammerhead then send the Shocker to try to recruit Electro into their organization. Instead, he later accepts Doctor Octopus' invitation to rejoin the Sinister Six, and battles Spider-Man.

Electro fights Spider-Man countless times, either on his own or as part of a group such as the Sinister Six. He also fights such other heroes as Daredevil, the Fantastic Four, and the New Avengers. Despite his immense power, he almost always is defeated, usually as a result of his foes outsmarting him or taking advantage of his weakness to water while charged. As a result of his frequent and often embarrassing defeats, Electro tries to take over New York City's power supply in an attempt at glory and respect. Spider-Man thwarts this plan, however, and convinces Electro to quit his criminal career. When Kaine (Spider-Man's clone) starts killing enemies of Spider-Man, Electro begins to fear for his life and temporarily joins Hobgoblin's Sinister Seven, which were formed to combat Kaine. This group is quickly disbanded, and following Kaine's subsequent disappearance, Electro returns to retirement.

This changes when the Rose agrees to fund an experimental technique that can amplify Electro's abilities, in exchange for Electro's services as an enforcer. Seeing this as a chance to rise above the string of failures that made up so much of his life, Electro undergoes the procedure. After paying off his debt to the Rose by defeating several members of The True Believers (an offshoot of the ninja sect called the Hand), a group of ninja assassins who was interfering in the Rose's operations, Electro attempts to demonstrate his newly amplified powers to the world, once again attempting to take control of New York City's power supply. Wearing an insulated suit, Spider-Man stops him. Electro, in an effort to make a final grand gesture, throws himself into the Hudson River while his body is highly charged, seemingly killing himself in an explosion.

Somehow surviving, Electro resurfaces later as part of the re-formed Sinister Six, formed to kill Senator Stewart Ward and Doctor Octopus (whom the other members of the Six hate due to his arrogance). His powers seemingly reverted to their pre-amplification level, and he wears a new blue-and-white costume. When Venom betrays his fellow Sinister Six members, attempting to kill them one by one, he attacks Electro and leaves him for dead. Once again, Electro survives, and returns to his yellow-and green-costume. Electro is working with the Vulture when they are attacked by Spider-Man, who thinks they kidnapped his Aunt May. Electro manages to bring Spider-Man to the edge of defeat, using his powers in more intelligent ways and blowing up a large number of cars, including some with children in them. After a devastating battle, Spider-Man defeats him by fighting him to a gas refinery. The badly wounded Electro recovers and shortly afterwards joins the Sinister Twelve, assembled by the Green Goblin, though he and the rest of the team is defeated thanks to the intervention of the Fantastic Four, Daredevil, Captain America, Iron Man and Yellowjacket.

Electro's new look in The Amazing Spider-Man #612. Art by Paul Azaceta.

Later, separately, he is hired by the Skrull Pagon (posing as Elektra) to free Karl Lykos (also known as Sauron) from the Raft, a maximum-security prison for supervillains. After causing a riot, Electro tries to run away with his waitress girlfriend, but is captured by the New Avengers, subsequently fainting when faced with the prospect of being beaten up by Luke Cage, using Spider-Man's webbing to protect himself from Electro. Later, Electro joins Chameleon's "Exterminators", seeking to take advantage of Peter Parker and his loved ones. During the "Civil War" storyline, Electro is among the villains in Hammerhead's unnamed villain army when Iron Man and S.H.I.E.L.D. raid the hideout. In "Secret Invasion," Electro appears as member of Hood's crime syndicate and attacks a Skrull force. After the Skrull posing as Edwin Jarvis kidnaps the baby of Luke Cage and Jessica Jones, the Avengers and the Fantastic Four begin going after everyone who is associated with the Skrulls. Because of this, Electro is confronted by Wolverine in an alley where, after a battle, he leaves Dillon beaten and unconscious.

Electro returns in issue 612 starting The Gauntlet, with a new look as his face is now scarred with lightning bolts and sporting a trench coat. The revamp was explained by writer Mark Waid, stating that artist Paul Azaceta "tweaked the design a bit, adding some burn scars to reflect Electro's current situation. As Electro gets older, as his body chemistry starts to shift into middle age, his powers are becoming more erratic and less easy for him to control. So he turns to a surprise Marvel villain – someone rarely, if ever, seen in the pages of Amazing – to level up." During his appearance in "The Gauntlet", it is revealed that Electro has lost control over his powers: besides the physical disfigurement, his touch is now 100% lethal. Depressed and angry at the world because of this, Electro begins gathering other outcasts and misfits into a group known as "Power To The People", which targets right-wing newspaper baron Dexter Bennett and the New York Stock Exchange in the wake of the 2008 Financial Crisis. Electro's group manages to gain positive coverage in the media, hampering Spider-Man's ability to convince Electro's followers of his true evil nature.

Electro's duplicitous nature causes him to betray his followers to align with the amoral Bennett in exchange for help finding a way to restore his powers to a controllable level. The Mad Thinker is able to come up with a process to cure Electro, but Spider-Man interferes with the process, turning Electro into an artificial electrical thunderbolt. Furious, Electro double-crosses Bennett and ultimately uses his new powers to destroy the Daily Bugle building, crippling Bennett in the process. In doing so, Electro uses up so much of his newfound power that Spider-Man is able to neutralize him with his webbing. In the epilogue, Electro runs into Sasha Kravinoff and Chameleon in his new jail cell. In the following issue involving Sandman, it is revealed that Electro has escaped. Under the orders of the Kravinoffs, he breaks the fourth Vulture out of prison.

During the "Heroic Age" storyline, it is suspected by the Young Allies that Electro had a discarded and disavowed daughter named Aftershock (similar to the MC2 Universe version) who is a member of the Bastards of Evil. When Young Allies members Firestar and Gravity fight Electro, he defeats them and lets them live so that they can spread the message that he does not endorse Aftershock and the Bastards of Evil's terrorism. He also says they can look up how and when he got his powers on the internet and there was no way a girl of Aftershock's age could have been conceived after he got his powers: It is impossible for him to be Aftershock's father. Electro is later present at the scene where Mattie Franklin is sacrificed by Sasha Kravinoff as part of a ritual that resurrects Vladimir Kravinoff as a lion-like creature.

In the Big Time storyline, Electro becomes a member of Doctor Octopus' new Sinister Six and helps Chameleon break into an air force base in New Jersey. During a conflict between the Intelligencia and the Sinister Six, the Mad Thinker briefly deactivates Electro's powers, but is caught off-guard and defeated by Electro. During the "'Ends of the Earth" storyline despite the Sinister Six being prepared for a fight with the Avengers, Electro was the first of the team to be defeated, being hurled into the upper atmosphere by Thor.

Electro returns to Earth and attempts to avenge himself on Thor by forcing an A.I.M. scientist to convert him to generate protons instead of electrons, but he is defeated when Superior Spider-Man (Doctor Octopus' mind in Spider-Man's body) manages to convert him into a stream of protons and traps him. Superior Spider-Man places Electro in containment next to Sandman in his hidden underwater lab. Electro, Chameleon, Sandman, Mysterion, and the Vulture are later seen as part of a team led by Superior Spider-Man called the "Superior Six". Superior Spider-Man has been temporarily controlling their minds to redeem them for their crimes. He does this by forcing them to do heroic deeds against their will, some of which almost get them killed. Every time he is done controlling them, he puts them back in their containment cells. They eventually break free of Superior Spider-Man's control and attempt to exact revenge on the wall-crawler, nearly destroying New York to do so. With the help of Sun Girl, Superior Spider-Man is barely able to stop the Superior Six. Electro is later seen battling the Punisher in Los Angeles.

Sometime after Spider-Man regains his body, Electro comes into the Bar With No Name and is introduced to the Hobgoblin's servants by his friend and bartender, Deke. The villains start joking about the gloomy Electro. One mentions how Thor launched him into space, another about how "Spider-Man" made him part of the Superior Six, and yet another about how Electro was taken out by the Punisher, despite the latter's lack of powers. Electro gets angry and starts sparking, but the bartender gets the situation under control by commenting on how bad the Punisher is and with compliments like breaking so many villains out of the Raft, which earned him the respect of Crossbones and Count Nefaria. This does not stop the others, however. Determined to get respect, Electro heads back over to the Raft, ready for another breakout despite the Green Goblin having done the same just recently and the fact that it was re-christened as Spider-Island. Electro sends a blot of electricity around, but it grows excessively big and he cannot turn it off. He finally exhausts all of his power but when this happens, he passes out and many of the villains he tried to break out are now dead. Vowing revenge, Electro soon realizes what caused this to happen to him: experiments conducted by "Spider-Man".

Electro later visits his friend, Francine Frye, and keeps his distance because of his uncontrollable powers. Francine starts to kiss Electro, only to end up dying from electrocution. Electro is later seen with Black Cat when they raid Eel's hideout, killing Eel. Electro and Black Cat later crash the meeting between Mister Negative and Phil Urich, throwing Eel's body into the meeting area. During Peter Parker's interview on the Fact Channel, Electro attacks the security team on the channel and the Black Cat arrives, announcing her demand that if Spider-Man does not show up in 15 minutes, Peter Parker will be dead. Electro complains about the plan but Black Cat stays determined that Spider-Man will show up, but then Silk arrives to confront them both, giving Peter the time to change into Spider-Man and jump into action, aiding Silk. As she battles against Electro and Spider-Man deals with Black Cat, J. Jonah Jameson remains on the channel forcing the cameraman to film the action. Electro fails to stop Silk, but Black Cat redirects one of Electro's bolts into hitting Spider-Man, knocking him down in the process.

As part of the "All-New, All-Different Marvel", a de-powered Max Dillon is shown as an inmate at Andry Corrections Facility alongside Lizard. Upon being sprung out of the prison by Rhino, he meets a mysterious red-suited man who offers to restore Electro's powers in exchange for his services. Jackal and Lizard work on the procedure that would re-power Maxwell Dillon. When Dillon was reluctant to go through with the procedure, Jackal brings in a woman who Dillon recognizes as Francine Frye. Frye observes the Jackal's attempt to restore Dillon's powers, but the experiment fails, charging his suit but not his body. Frye leans in to kiss Dillon and kills him in the process while absorbing his powers. Doctor Octopus later resurrects Electro with his powers intact.

=== Francine Frye ===
The second Electro, Francine Frye, in the cover of The Amazing Spider-Man vol. 4, #17, art by Alex Ross.

Debuting in The Amazing Spider-Man vol. 3 #2 (July 2014) Francine Frye is a woman who is a fan of supervillains. At some point, she befriended Electro. At the time when Electro was losing control of his abilities, she was visited by him. When attempting to kiss Electro, Frye died from electrocution.

Ben Reilly / Jackal later revived her in a clone body with her soul intact, lacking her piercings and tattoos. After he summoned her to help persuade Electro to go through with the procedure that would repower him, it turned out that Electro's saliva was mixed in with Frye's DNA, which led to her kissing Dillon enough to kill him and becoming the second Electro. She later encountered Prowler, at the time when he infiltrated New U Technologies. During the chase, Electro accidentally caused the apparent death of Prowler causing Jackal to make a clone of him.

Electro later appears as a member of the Sinister Six, consisting of Hobgoblin, Bombshell, Spot, and Sandman and led by Aaron Davis. She accompanied them in their mission to steal a decommissioned S.H.I.E.L.D. Helicarrier. Mayor Wilson Fisk's operatives later recruit Electro into an all-female incarnation of the Sinister Syndicate.

During the "Devil's Reign" storyline, Electro is recruited into the Thunderbolts by Wilson Fisk to help the NYPD crack down on superhuman vigilantism. After Fisk is ousted as mayor of New York City and replaced by Luke Cage, Electro joins Julia Gao's Cape-Killers in exchange for a lighter sentence.

== Powers and abilities ==
Electro can generate massive quantities of electricity, up to approximately 100,000 volts. He can employ this electrostatic energy as lightning arcs from his fingertips, and his maximum charge is more than enough to kill a normal human. When his body is charged to high levels, he becomes superhumanly strong and fast. He can also glide over power lines by using the electricity contained therein for propulsion, and he has on occasion been shown to actually ride on lightning bolts.

During a stint in prison, Doctor Octopus gave him the ideas of ionizing metals and sparking the petroleum in the fuel tanks of vehicles as a way to generate explosions. He can charge himself up to make himself more powerful. He can also absorb the energy of electrical equipment such as a power plant to increase his powers further. In New Avengers, he was shown to fly and manipulate large amounts of electricity and machinery, when he freed all the prisoners at Ryker's Island.

An experimental procedure heightens his powers, allowing Electro to store and absorb a seemingly limitless amount of electricity. He also seems to gain the power over magnetism to a certain degree, allowing him to manipulate magnetic fields and move objects in a manner similar to that of Magneto, and can overcome his old weakness to water by using the electromagnetic fields around him to vaporize water before it can touch him. He makes Spider-Man beg by stimulating the bioelectric currents in his brain, and is able to defeat Nate Grey by manipulating said currents in Nate's brain to turn his own psionic powers against him.

Electro can override any electrically powered device and manipulate it according to his mental commands. By using an external electrical power source to recharge his body's energy reserves, Electro can expend electricity indefinitely without diminishing his personal reserves. When he is fully charged, Electro is extremely sensitive to anything that may "short circuit" him, such as water. Electro propels himself along magnetic lines of force in objects that have great electrical potential, such as high-tension electrical lines. He can also create electrostatic bridges to traverse upon, at the cost of a great expenditure of energy.

During the events of the storyline "The Gauntlet", Electro becomes a living artificial thunderbolt, allowing him to travel through electrical appliances such as going through a light bulb and exiting through any other electronic device connected to the power source. He is also able to transmit himself over Spider-Man's web line.

== Reception ==
During an interview with Newsarama about The Gauntlet and Grim Hunt, Mark Waid claimed that the character of Electro is "one of the smart criminals who was saving what he's been stealing from banks and savings and loans". He also described Electro as the "anti-bailout guy".

A Comics Bulletin review published by Ray Tate of Young Allies #2 described Electro's appearance in that issue as "a punk with a gimmick". He also claimed that the character "never harbored a pathological hatred of Spider-Man", and that he instead "developed a healthy loathing for Spidey because the Wall Crawler frequently interfered with his sole goal of larceny". Ray believes that Electro "isn't a wanton psychopath", but a "bank robber with electrical powers", and that he is "not nuts" but "a felon". These remarks show that Electro's character is received not as being mentally ill, but simply a thieving villain.

In 2009, Electro was ranked as IGN's 87th Greatest Comic Book Villain of All Time.

In 2022, Screen Rant ranked Electro 6th in their "10 Most Powerful Silk Villains In Marvel Comics" list.

== Other versions ==
Many alternate versions of Electro have appeared throughout the character's publication history.

=== Marvel 2099 ===
In Marvel 2099, Electro is an android who gained sentience after his employers accidentally removed the chips controlling him.

=== Marvel Noir ===
In Marvel Noir, Electro has no innate powers, utilizing a lightning rod as a weapon and deriving his electrical powers from Tesla coils strapped to his back.

=== Ultimate Marvel ===
Ultimate Electro. Art by Mark Bagley

In the Ultimate Marvel universe, Electro gained powers from experimentation by Justin Hammer Jr. Unlike his mainstream counterpart, this version is bald, wears a black leather outfit, and sports burn scars.

Three weeks after a battle with Spider-Man, Electro wakes from his coma and escapes custody, murdering several people in the process. He also becomes a being of pure electricity after losing his containment suit.

== In other media ==
=== Television ===
Electro as he appears in Spider-Man: The New Animated Series

Electro as he appears in The Spectacular Spider-Man

- The Max Dillon incarnation of Electro makes a cameo appearance in The Marvel Super Heroes episode "Dr. Doom's Day".
- The Max Dillon incarnation of Electro appears in Spider-Man (1967), voiced by Tom Harvey.
- The Max Dillon incarnation of Electro appears in Spider-Man and His Amazing Friends, voiced by Allan Melvin.
- An original incarnation of Electro appears in the Spider-Man: The Animated Series five-part episode "Six Forgotten Warriors", voiced by Philip Proctor. This version is Rheinholt Schmidt, a German Nazi who masqueraded as Russian police chief Rheinholt Kragov for most of his life while searching for and impersonating his father, the Red Skull, in an attempt to gain control of his doomsday device. Once Spider-Man, the Kingpin, and the Insidious Six retrieve the keys and box needed to access it, Rheinholt traps them and works with his step-brother, the Chameleon, to access the doomsday device and free the Red Skull from his energy vortex prison. The Red Skull subsequently uses the weapon on Rheinholt, turning him into Electro, but the latter betrays him for risking his life and tries to take over the world for himself until Spider-Man tricks him into trapping himself in the energy vortex before destroying the machine.
- A Counter-Earth incarnation of Electro appears in the Spider-Man Unlimited (1999) episode "Ill-Met By Moonlight", voiced by Dale Wilson. This version is a Bestial electric eel and guard for the High Evolutionary.
- The Max Dillon incarnation of Electro appears in Spider-Man: The New Animated Series, voiced by Ethan Embry. This version is a geeky teenager and Peter Parker's friend who attends Empire State University before gaining electrical powers after being covered in an unknown substance and struck by lightning.
- The Max Dillon incarnation of Electro appears in The Spectacular Spider-Man, voiced by Crispin Freeman. This version was transformed into a living electric capacitor following a freak accident involving genetically altered electric rays and eels. Afterwards, he is placed in an insulated body suit to contain his bio-electricity and attempts to lead a normal life again until Spider-Man mistakes him for a supervillain and Electro turns to crime. Following this, Electro would go on to battle Spider-Man on several occasions and join two incarnations of the Sinister Six until he is eventually defeated and arrested.
- The Max Dillon incarnation of Electro appears in Ultimate Spider-Man (2012), voiced by Christopher Daniel Barnes. This version is a longtime enemy of Spider-Man, who views him as incompetent, until he absorbs energy from Times Square and transforms into a hyper-electrified form. Electro gains the ability to clone himself and control machinery, though excessive use of his powers causes him to become physically and mentally unstable. In later appearances, Electro joins the Sinister Six.
- The Francine Frye incarnation of Electro appears in Spider-Man (2017), voiced by Daisy Lightfoot. This version is an African-American teenager who uses an exoskeleton that grants her electrical powers, which she needs to constantly recharge.
- The Max Dillon incarnation of Electro appears in Marvel Super Hero Adventures, voiced by Ian James Corlett.
- The Francine Frye incarnation of Electro appears in Spidey and His Amazing Friends, voiced by Stephanie Lemelin.

=== Film ===
Jamie Foxx as Electro in The Amazing Spider-Man 2.

- An original incarnation of Electro appears in James Cameron's aborted 1994 film script, with Lance Henriksen being considered for the role. This version would have been Carlton Strand, who acquired his powers years prior while on the run from the police after he stole mercury in New Mexico. Over the years, he became a powerful billionaire and attempts to create a "master race" with him as its leader. He and his henchman "Boyd", a man with sand powers, would also try to bribe Spider-Man into joining him, but Strand is killed in battle over the World Trade Center.
- The Max Dillon incarnation of Electro appears in two Marvel films, portrayed by Jamie Foxx. This version is an Oscorp electrical engineer who views himself as a nobody and idolizes Spider-Man after the hero saves him from Aleksei Sytsevich.
  - Dillon first appears in the Sony Pictures film The Amazing Spider-Man 2. Foxx revealed that the character was redesigned to be more grounded and that the villain's classic yellow and green suit would be omitted in favor of a modern look. While fixing a power line on his birthday, Dillon is electrocuted and falls into a tank of genetically engineered electric eels, whereupon he gains his electrokinesis. Surviving the ordeal, a disfigured but drained Dillon heads to Times Square to rejuvenate himself with more electricity, but is confronted by Spider-Man. Initially excited, a stray shot from an NYPD sniper causes Dillon to believe Spider-Man set him up and attack him, only to be subdued by the former and sent to Ravencroft for study. Taking the alias "Electro", he is broken out by Harry Osborn, who requires his help in breaking into Oscorp. Electro agrees and is given a new suit to control his powers. After they successfully break in, Harry allows Electro to take over the electrical grid he designed and take control of New York's electricity. Spider-Man confronts him once more and repairs the damage so Gwen Stacy can reactivate the grid and allow the web-slinger to overload Electro with his own electricity, causing the latter to explode.
  - Dillon appears in the Marvel Cinematic Universe film Spider-Man: No Way Home, sporting an updated redesign more closely resembling his mainstream comics counterpart. Prior to his death in The Amazing Spider-Man 2, Electro is transported to the MCU due to a botched spell and absorbs electricity from transmission towers outside of New York to restore his physical form until he is defeated by the MCU Spider-Man (later dubbed "Peter-One") and Sandman and transported to the New York Sanctum. There, Electro learns he and his fellow prisoners were displaced from their native universes moments before they died fighting their respective versions of Spider-Man. Though Peter-One attempts to change their fates by curing them of their powers, the Green Goblin convinces the prisoners to fight back instead until they are defeated and cured by Peter-One, Electro's Spider-Man, and a third Spider-Man and returned to their native universes by Doctor Strange.

=== Video games ===
- The Max Dillon incarnation of Electro appears as a boss in Spider-Man: The Video Game, Spider-Man: Mysterio's Menace, Spider-Man: Return of the Sinister Six, and Spider-Man vs. The Kingpin.
- The Max Dillon incarnation of Electro appears in Spider-Man and Captain America in Doctor Doom's Revenge.
- The Max Dillon incarnation of Electro appears in The Amazing Spider-Man 3: Invasion of the Spider-Slayers.
- The Max Dillon incarnation of Electro appears in Spider-Man 2: Enter Electro, voiced by Dee Bradley Baker. He intends to use the "Bio-Nexus Device", a mechanism that can enhance a person's bioelectric field, to become a god. Working with the Shocker, the Sandman, the Beetle, and Hammerhead, Electro abducts Dr. Watts, the creator of the device, and fights Spider-Man over its possession. Electro eventually uses the device to become a being of pure energy dubbed "Hyper-Electro", but is ultimately de-powered and defeated by Spider-Man and imprisoned.
- The Ultimate Marvel incarnation of Max Dillon / Electro appears as a boss in the Ultimate Spider-Man (2005), voiced by James Arnold Taylor.
- The Max Dillon incarnation of Electro appears as a boss in the Game Boy Advance version of Spider-Man 3. Spider-Man also briefly mentions Electro in one of the missions in the seventh-generation (Windows, Xbox 360, and PlayStation 3) versions of the game.
- The Max Dillon incarnation of Electro appears as a boss and playable character in the PSP version of Spider-Man: Friend or Foe, voiced by David Kaye. Mysterio captures and places him under mind control before sending him to an island in the Mediterranean Sea to retrieve a meteor shard. After Spider-Man defeats him and destroys his mind-control device, Electro joins forces with him to exact revenge on Mysterio.
- The Max Dillon incarnation of Electro appears as an assist character in Spider-Man: Web of Shadows, voiced by Liam O'Brien. He goes on a rampage through quarantine camps that S.H.I.E.L.D. established for symbiote-infected people while searching for his sister. After Spider-Man defeats him, Electro is shot by Black Widow, though his infected sister infects him with her symbiote to heal him. He subsequently escapes and reemerges during the symbiotes' invasion of Earth before he is defeated by Spider-Man, who frees him from his symbiote's control.
- The Max Dillon incarnation of Electro appears as a boss in Marvel: Ultimate Alliance 2, voiced by Kirk Thornton.
- The Ultimate Marvel incarnation of Max Dillon / Electro appears as a boss in Spider-Man: Shattered Dimensions, voiced by Thomas F. Wilson. He uses a fragment of the Tablet of Order and Chaos to enhance his powers and take over a hydroelectric dam, becoming larger and more powerful as he absorbs more energy. He also gains the ability to create minions to attack Spider-Man, who eventually defeats Electro by tricking him into destroying the dam, shorting him out, while Spider-Man claims his tablet fragment. In the Nintendo DS version, the mainstream incarnation of Max Dillon / Electro appears as a boss.
- The Max Dillon incarnation of Electro appears in Marvel Heroes, voiced again by Liam O'Brien.
- The Max Dillon incarnation of Electro appears in Marvel Super Hero Squad Online, voiced by Steve Blum.
- The mainstream and Ultimate Marvel incarnations of Max Dillon / Electro appear as separate playable characters in Lego Marvel Super Heroes, both voiced by David Sobolov.
- The Max Dillon incarnation of Electro appears as a boss in The Amazing Spider-Man 2 film tie-in game, voiced by Michael A. Shepperd in most versions and by Liam O'Brien in the mobile version. Similarly to the film the game is based on, this version is an Oscorp engineer who is rescued by Spider-Man after two rival gangs attack the company. Dillon also helps Spider-Man prevent a potentially catastrophic incident, which causes him to develop an unhealthy attraction towards the hero. After failing to report an Oscorp employee who took credit for his power grid to Donald Menken, Dillon suffers a freak accident that grants him electrical powers. Realizing that Spider-Man will not recognize him in his current state and for fear of being arrested, he becomes the criminal Electro. He is subsequently arrested and sent to Ravencroft, where he becomes one of several test subjects for experiments funded by the Kingpin and overseen by Menken. Dillon eventually escapes and drains the city's power, causing a blackout. When Spider-Man confronts him, Dillon blames the web-slinger for failing to save him from Menken and attacks the former, only to be defeated by him and explode.
- Various alternate reality variants of Max Dillon / Electro appear as bosses in Spider-Man Unlimited (2014), all voiced again by Christopher Daniel Barnes. They appear as members of a multiversal Sinister Six.
- The Max Dillon incarnation of Electro appears as a playable character in Lego Marvel Super Heroes 2. Additionally, his Marvel 2099 counterpart is also playable and serves as a minor boss in the game's story.
- The Francine Frye incarnation of Electro appears in Marvel Strike Force as a member of the Sinister Six.
- The Max Dillon incarnation of Electro appears as a boss in Marvel's Spider-Man, voiced by Josh Keaton. This version is bald, has star-shaped facial scars, and is a long-time adversary of Spider-Man. Electro is initially imprisoned in the Raft until Otto Octavius stages a prison break and recruits Electro, among others, into his Sinister Six in exchange for Octavius helping him achieve his ultimate goal of becoming a being of pure energy. After the team overpowers Spider-Man, the Sinister Six split up to attack different Oscorp properties, with Electro being sent to cripple the city's power supply. He later joins forces with the Vulture to kill Spider-Man before they are defeated and re-incarcerated.
- The Max Dillon incarnation of Electro appears as a boss in Marvel Ultimate Alliance 3: The Black Order, voiced again by Christopher Daniel Barnes. This version is a member of the Sinister Six.
- The Francine Frye incarnation of Electro appears as a playable character in Marvel Puzzle Quest.

=== Miscellaneous ===
- The Max Dillon incarnation of Electro in The Amazing Adventures of Spider-Man, voiced by Jim Wise. This version is a member of the Sinister Syndicate.
- The Max Dillon incarnation of Electro appears in Spider-Man: Turn Off the Dark, portrayed by Emmanuel Brown. This version was originally an Oscorp scientist until the Green Goblin turns him into Electro and manipulates him into joining his Sinister Six.
- The Max Dillon incarnation of Electro appears in Marvel Universe: LIVE!. This version is a member of the Sinister Six.
