= Plantman =

Marvel Comics fictional characters

- Samuel Smithers as the first Plantman. Art by Stan Woch.

Publication information
- Publisher: Marvel Comics
- First appearance: Samuel Smithers: Strange Tales #113 (October 1963); Paul: The Astonishing Ant-Man #7 (April 2016)
- Created by: Samuel Smithers: Stan Lee & Joe Carter (co-writers); Dick Ayers (artist); Paul: Nick Spencer (writer); Ramon Rosanas (artist)

In-story information
- Alter ego: Samuel Smithers; Paul
- Species: Human mutate
- Team affiliations: Thunderbolts; Maggia; New Enforcers; Lethal Legion
- Notable aliases: Blackheath
- Abilities: Plant manipulation; Device usage

Plantman is the name of two supervillains appearing in American comic books published by Marvel Comics: Samuel Smithers (created by Stan Lee, Joe Carter, and Dick Ayers) and Paul (created by Nick Spencer and Ramon Rosanas), both with the ability to control plants, Samuel via technology and Paul via biology. Samuel also goes by the name Blackheath as a member of the Thunderbolts.

== Publication history ==
The Samuel Smithers iteration of Plantman first appeared in Strange Tales #113 and was created by Stan Lee, Jerry Siegel (under the alias of Joe Carter), and Dick Ayers.

The Paul incarnation of Plantman first appeared in The Astonishing Ant-Man #7 and was created by Nick Spencer and Ramon Rosanas.

== Fictional character biography ==
=== Samuel Smithers ===
Samuel Smithers is an assistant botanist who invents a device capable of communicating with plants. Mocked for his accomplishments, he becomes a criminal after lightning strikes his device and gives it the additional ability to manipulate and animate plants.

Plantman has often used plant "simuloids" to create duplicates of himself for mercenary endeavors, raising quick cash to continue his research. Utilizing with an army of 1,000 plant simulacra, Plantman captures the President of the United States by taking over an American military base. The Avengers overcome Plantman's army and rescue the President, though Plantman escapes.

While serving time in Seagate Prison, Plantman is telepathically contacted by Mentallo, who is being held in a stasis field. Mentallo was still capable of using his powers and he used them to orchestrate a break-out of his fellow prisoners, which includes the hero Hawkeye (who was serving time for crimes he performed while a member of the Thunderbolts) and Headlok. The criminals, remotely "chained" to one another, escape and reluctantly agree to work together to search for a way to survive, deactivate their security manacles, and find a weapon of great power left behind following the death of Justin Hammer.

Unknown to his associates, Hawkeye is actually working undercover on behalf of S.H.I.E.L.D. Ultimately, the Chain Gang is tracked down by Hawkeye's former teammate Songbird, who helps Hawkeye defeat the villains. They discover that Hammer's weapon was a biological toxin that had been ingested by every villain who had worked for him, with Plantman being a carrier. Hawkeye, Songbird, and Plantman begin searching for the trigger that would release Plantman's toxin so that it would not fall into the wrong hands. The search ended with Hammer's daughter, Justine, who turns out to be the Crimson Cowl, leader of the Masters of Evil. Hawkeye convinces several members of the Masters of Evil to side with him and Songbird against Crimson Cowl and their former allies, pointing out the dangers of the super-weapon, which would either blackmail or kill them. Hoping to throw off suspicion, Hawkeye makes the villains reinvent their costumed identities, thus creating a new team of Thunderbolts, and Plantman joins the group as Blackheath.

When the Thunderbolts finally confront the Crimson Cowl, Blackheath is captured and experimented on to reveal the secrets of the bio-toxin. During this procedure, his spirit connects with the Verdant Green, Earth's energy field. It tells him that he could release the toxin, removing humanity from the biosphere and allowing plants to flourish as in Earth's pre-industrial days. Instead, Blackheath chooses to release an antidote for the toxin into the atmosphere, apparently dying in the process.

Blackheath revives himself by sucking moisture from Hydro-Man, leaving Hydro-Man's body desiccated. The Thunderbolts are aided against S.H.I.E.L.D. by the arrival of Citizen V, who needed their help in dealing with his agency's ship — the engines of which were made of alien technology that had begun distorting, threatening to suck Earth into a white hole. In doing so, the Thunderbolts encounter the original Thunderbolts, who had been trapped on Counter-Earth. The two teams of Thunderbolts combine forces to plug the void and shunt the alien ship from Earth.

Blackheath joins Helmut Zemo's Thunderbolts in many acts of questionable heroism, where the ends justified the means. Zemo's ultimate plan involves the creation of the Liberator, a device that would drain abnormal uses of energy throughout the world and hopefully reduce global threats, eliminate superhuman terrorism, and stabilize the world's status quo. The Thunderbolts succeed in launching the Liberator, only to be confronted by the Avengers. Feeling betrayed, Moonstone absorbs the powers the Liberator had harnessed. The Thunderbolts and the Avengers team up to defeat Moonstone, ultimately removing the alien gem that she derived her powers from. The members of the Thunderbolts agree to go their separate ways, and Blackheath agrees to return to prison, hoping to reconnect with his human nature that he felt he was slowly losing.

During the "AXIS" storyline, Plantman appears as a giant plant monster and attacks Los Angeles to retaliate at humans for polluting the world. When a group of Avengers attack, they turn on each other due to the influence of Red Onslaught, a clone of Red Skull with parts of Professor X's brain placed in him. Plantman is defeated by Iron Man.

=== Paul ===
Paul is a comic book store clerk until he is fired for stealing comics to sell to support his gaming hobby. He attends Power Broker Inc.'s presentation of the Hench X App, which transforms him into a humanoid plant. Plantman later joins Helmut Zemo's "New Masters" alongside Firebrand and Flying Tiger.

== Powers and abilities ==
Both incarnations of Plantman can manipulate plants. The Samuel Smithers incarnation's abilities are derived from technology, while the Paul incarnation possesses them innately.

The Samuel Smithers incarnation of Plantman is served by humanoid plants called simuloids that are duplicates of himself, one of whom attained sentience and became Terraformer.

== Other versions ==
- An alternate universe version of Samuel Smithers / Plantman from Earth-20051 appears in Marvel Adventures. This version is a scientist who values plants over people.
- An alternate universe version of Samuel Smithers from Earth-1610 appears in Ultimate Comics: X-Men #18. This version is a plant-based mutant.

== In other media ==
The Samuel Smithers incarnation of Plantman appears in The Super Hero Squad Show episode "O Captain, My Captain!", voiced by Charlie Adler.
