= Count Nefaria =

Fictional character from Marvel Comics

- Count Nefaria fighting the Avengers on the cover of Avengers #166 (December 1977). Art by George Pérez and Ernie Chan.

Publication information
- Publisher: Marvel Comics
- First appearance: The Avengers #13 (February 1965)
- Created by: Stan Lee (writer); Don Heck (artist)

In-story information
- Alter ego: Luchino Nefaria
- Species: Human mutate
- Team affiliations: Legion of the Unliving; Lethal Legion; Death Squad; Ani-Men; Maggia
- Notable aliases: Dream Master; Dream Maker
- Abilities: Ionic-energy physiology granting: Superhuman strength, speed, agility, endurance, senses, staminas and reflexes; Ionic-energy manipulation; Energy-enhanced strike; Construct creation; Energy vampirism; Ionic conversion; Healing factor; Invulnerability; Teleportation; Immortality; Flight; Genius-level inventor; Criminal mastermind

Count Luchino Nefaria is a supervillain appearing in American comic books published by Marvel Comics. Created by Stan Lee and Don Heck, the character first appeared in The Avengers #13 (February 1965). Count Nefaria is a socialite and crime boss who operates an international crime syndicate known as the Maggia.

== Publication history ==
Count Nefaria debuted in The Avengers #13 (February 1965), created by Stan Lee and Don Heck. He appeared in the 2011 Moon Knight series. He appeared in the 2018 Marvel Action Avengers series. He appeared in the 2023 New Mutants Lethal Legion series.

== Fictional character biography ==
Luchino Nefaria is a wealthy Italian aristocrat and traditionalist that also desires greater wealth and power, driving him to join the Maggia criminal organization. The recently formed Avengers superhero team, however, thwart many of his plans and force a direct conflict, so Nefaria lures the Avengers to his castle on the pretense of a charity event, and places the group in suspended animation, using images which threaten to take control of America. After he releases them, the Avengers become suspicious of him after hearing they are wanted and they cannot remember what happened at the castle. They go to the castle, however nearly all of them are paralyzed by Nefaria's gas. Meanwhile, the Teen Brigade were captured by Nefaria, and when they tried to contact the Avengers were thrown in a dungeon which would place them into suspended animation if they touched the walls. Captain America gets into the castle without touching the ground, other Avengers, or walls, and freed the Teen Brigade, who gave the antidote to the Avengers. Captain America was also paralyzed, and with his hands and feet attached to ropes he was suspended between floor and ceiling, where Nefaria mocked him, saying he would be a hero for capturing him. However, Iron Man then burst through the wall. Neferia was defeated and deported after an officer heard him confess to being in the Maggia. In retaliation, Nefaria then unsuccessfully attempts to destroy Iron Man, and then suffers yet another defeat when stopped by the mutant X-Men team.

Nefaria reappears several years later and attempts to take control of the United States base NORAD, but is stopped by the X-Men once again. Nefaria attempts to escape in a plane which is attacked by the X-Man Thunderbird. The plane explodes, killing Thunderbird and injuring Nefaria.

Now virtually destitute and discredited, Nefaria hires the supervillains Living Laser, Power Man and Whirlwind to form the second Lethal Legion. The group rob several banks, and unwittingly finance an experiment Nefaria has created in a bid to become superhuman. Employing the former scientific adviser to Heinrich Zemo, Nefaria devises a means of temporarily amplifying the abilities of the Lethal Legion, and then sends them into combat against the Avengers. The effect, however, is temporary and once defeated their combined abilities are drained by Nefaria who possesses them magnified a hundredfold. After a long and protracted battle, Nefaria is finally defeated.

Nefaria is kept in isolation and under observation by the Avengers, and it is discovered that the process to empower him makes Nefaria immortal but vulnerable as his body reconfigures itself. Whitney Frost, also known as Madame Masque and the daughter of Nefaria, attempts to find a cure for what is believed to be his deteriorating condition. She hires the Ani-Men to attack Avengers Mansion and free her father. While battling Iron Man, Nefaria's life-support system is severed and his weakened form is crushed by a stored Jupiter Landing Vehicle. Nefaria briefly reappears some time later as a corpse reanimated by the Grim Reaper. Grim Reaper directs Nefaria to attack the Avengers, but loses control soon afterwards and Nefaria dies once again.

Nefaria eventually reappears, but in an ionic humanoid form, and constantly requires ionic energy to sustain his existence. Nefaria plans to detonate an ionic bomb, which will transform millions of people into an ionic state which he can then control, perceiving it as the best way to guarantee that he receives the respect that he feels he deserves. Nefaria gains control of the ionic heroes Wonder Man and Atlas, who he intends to use to kill the Avengers. He is stopped by the Avengers, the Thunderbolts, and Madame Masque, with Masque using a weapon she had developed to disrupt Nefaria's energy.

Following the "Siege" storyline, Madame Masque seeks out Nefaria to help the Hood after Loki takes back the Norn Stones. The New Avengers capture John King and use him to track the Hood and Madame Masque. After a battle with Count Nefaria, they capture the villains and bring all four of them to Maria Hill to place them under arrest.

During the "Gang War" storyline, Count Nefaria is attacked by Madame Masque, who takes control of the Maggia. Nefaria is placed under mind control and is among the villains who battle Spider-Man in Central Park. Shotgun shoots off the mind-control sigil on Count Nefaria, freeing him from its control.

== Powers and abilities ==
Count Nefaria has a genius-level intellect. He is a versed scientist, inventor, theoretical physicist, adept strategist and organizational leader with deep ties to the underworld through his own crime family, the Maggia. During his first appearance he easily turned the American public and the world over against the Avengers in their first meeting. After being subjected to a process perfected by Kenneth Sturdy, Nefaria was granted the combined powers of Living Laser, Power Man, and Whirlwind, amplified a hundredfold. He has toppled a 40-story building with little effort, withstood a blow from Wonder Man without flinching, and fought an enraged Thor to a standstill with no apparent damage from strikes of his hammer, even stopping it with his bare hand.

Count Nefaria aged until his body evolved, eventually shifting into pure ionic form. This gives him the ability to fly, project ionic energy, teleport, and control other ionic beings by siphoning their energy. Nefaria can convert others into ionic energy beings in a vampiric fashion, turning them into his thralls. Nefaria can surround opponents in ionic energy and move them about telekinetically.

As a head of the Maggia, Count Nefaria also has access to vast amounts of technology, munitions, and gadgetry developed by his Research and Development department. Being of Italian nobility, Nefaria has also inherited a vast fortune, which he has used in conjunction with his intellect for the purpose of furthering his revenue and power. To that end he would use it for the hiring of super villains, scientists and expendable workforce in his organization branch for the creation of inventions that were far in the advances of modern science, give himself super powers or broaden the reach of his connections to both the unlawful and political circuit of the world. Being an aristocrat of considerable stature and influence, Nefaria also has claims to diplomatic immunity and as such he cannot be tried outside of his own home country.

== Reception ==
=== Critical response ===
Chase Magnett of ComicBook.com included Count Nefaria in their "10 Iron Man Villains Who Should Return in Dan Slott's Run" list, calling him a "great pick for a new arch nemesis in Tony Stark: Iron Man." Comic Book Resources ranked Count Nefaria 4th in their "10 Most Powerful Crime Bosses In Marvel Comics" list, 5th in their "10 Coolest Avengers Villains" list, and 8th in their "Wonder Man's 10 Greatest Enemies" list. Nathan P. Gibson of Looper ranked Count Nefaria 14th in their "Every Moon Knight Villain Ranked From Worst To Best" list.

== In other media ==
=== Television ===
- Count Nefaria appears in the "Iron Man" segment of The Marvel Super Heroes, voiced by Chris Wiggins.
- Count Nefaria appears in Iron Man: Armored Adventures, voiced by Russell Roberts. This version is the leader of the Maggia.

=== Film ===
Count Nefaria makes a non-speaking appearance in Avengers Confidential: Black Widow & Punisher.

=== Video games ===
- Count Nefaria appears in Marvel Avengers Alliance.
- Count Nefaria appears in Lego Marvel's Avengers.
- Count Nefaria appears in Marvel Contest of Champions.
