= Crippler (character) =

Fictional comic book character

Publication information
- Publisher: Marvel Comics
- First appearance: Daredevil Annual #7 (1991)
- Created by: Gregory Wright and Jackson Guice

In-story information
- Alter ego: Carl Striklan
- Team affiliations: Hydra; Wild Pack

Crippler is a fictional character appearing in American comic books published by Marvel Comics.

Crippler is a mercenary who was once a member of Hydra, but later quit to become a vigilante and later member of Silver Sable's Wild Pack.

== Fictional character biography ==
Carl Stricklan was once a U.S. Marine, but was dishonorably discharged. He became a New York police officer, but was dismissed for excessive brutality. As the Crippler, he became an agent in the employ of Hydra, as a member of the Elite Bounty Division. He was sent on a mission by Baron Strucker to retrieve Sathan. The Crippler battled Daredevil, Darius, and Sathan. He then quit Hydra to become a vigilante. He next battled the Wildboys.

The Crippler soon became a mercenary, and joined the Silver Sable's Wild Pack. On his first mission with them, he battled Gattling and The Watchdogs. Next, the Wild Pack were sent to rescue Silver Sable, and battled doppelgangers of the Sandman and Doctor Doom. They then met Deathlok. The Wild Pack searched for Deathlok's human body, and battled the Cyberwarriors. The Wild Pack was then hired by J. Jonah Jameson to capture the Human Torch. With the Wild Pack, the Crippler then battled Venom. The Wild Pack then battled the Genesis Coalition. The Wild Pack then teamed up with Next Wave, Stingray, and Siege to battle the Cyberwarriors and Genesis Coalition.

=== The Initiative ===
Stricklan is being considered as a "potential recruit" for the Initiative program.

== Powers and abilities ==
The Crippler is a normal man with an athletic build. He is an extraordinary street-fighter, and received further training in armed and unarmed combat from the U.S. Marines, NYPD, Hydra, and Silver Sable. He is an expert marksman, and an expert with knives, whips, staves, and most other hand weapons.

He wears a Kevlar-lined costume provided by Silver Sable, and uses his Hydra-supplied cobtraton (a sectioned telescoping steel baton), and various knives, hand guns, rifles, and flamethrowers as needed.

The Crippler has a deranged addiction to physical violence and enjoys both inflicting and experiencing physical pain.
