= Wild Pack =

Fictional comic book group

- Image of Silver Sable and the Wild Pack from Silver Sable and the Wild Pack #9.

Publication information
- Publisher: Marvel Comics
- First appearance: The Amazing Spider-Man #265 (1985)
- Created by: Gregory Wright; Steve Butler; Jim Sanders

In-story information
- Base(s): Wild Pack Headquarters, Symkaria; Symkarian Embassy, New York City
- Member(s): Members

The Wild Pack is a fictional mercenary team appearing in American comic books published by Marvel Comics. The team is led by Silver Sable.

== Publication history ==
The Wild Pack first appears in The Amazing Spider-Man #265 and was created by Gregory Wright, Steve Butler, and Jim Sanders.

== Fictional team history ==
The Wild Pack was formed by Silver Sable's father, Ernst Sablinovia, for the apprehension of international criminals, and the recovery of stolen property for a wide spectrum of clients, from major insurance companies to small nations. As a young girl, Silver Sable witnessed her mother's death at the hands of terrorists and it is then that she becomes determined to take over leadership of the group. She joins her father's team at the age of 17 and is soon promoted to second-in-command. Later, her father embarks alone to track down his wife's killer. Sable and the Wild Pack catch up with him, in time to see the villain kill her father and escape with the body. Believing her father dead, Sable assumes command of the Wild Pack.

When the number of war criminals declines, Sable turns her Wild Pack toward other activities and begins selling her services around the world. The group eventually gains the approval of the Symkarian government and in fact becomes the major source of outside income for Symkaria. While typically composed of elite mercenary soldiers, Sable has occasionally hired freelance operatives to serve in the Pack.

Once, Silver Sable steps down from leadership of the Wild Pack. This was during a period of soul-searching after Silver Sable is believed to be pregnant, although this is actually due to a computer error. During this time, the Wild Pack is led by Sable's father, who is revealed to have survived. As Sable monitors the team's progress however, she feels compelled to step in and take an active hand in leadership once more, stating that the team is like a family to her and is where she belongs.

The elite agents who have worked with Silver Sable for a long time go their separate ways. Sable is left to lead a team that is becoming increasingly lazy and incompetent. After four unsuccessful missions and the betrayal of several agents, Silver Sable decides that the group has become too broken and fractured to maintain. Bringing her agents together one last time, Silver Sable informs them that she is going into retirement and that the Pack themselves will be dissolved.

=== The Outlaws ===
After a number of encounters with superhuman agents, vigilantes and enemies, Sable begins to use them in future assignments. Later, Sable decides to create an elite version of the Wild Pack, the Outlaws. The Outlaws feature Sable associates Prowler, Puma, Rocket Racer, Sandman and Will o' the Wisp. They encounter Excalibur in the course of their adventures, but are soon disbanded in favor of the traditional Wild Pack.

=== The Intruders ===
Silver Sable continues to lead her Wild Pack in mercenary endeavors. She also hires the hero Battlestar to serve on the team. When the team begins attracting superhuman associates such as Fin and Man-Eater, Sable forms another elite offshoot of the Wild Pack called the Intruders. Sandman leads the Intruders, which includes Fin, Lightbright, Man-Eater, and Paladin. They often engage in assignments independently of the Wild Pack. Although the team never officially disbands, the Intruders are presumably dissolved by Silver Sable several months later.

=== Return of the Wild Pack ===
Silver Sable later resurfaced following her apparent death and has reformed the Wild Pack to combat Katrina Karkov. This team consists of Foxtrot, Juliet, Romeo, Tango, and X-Ray.

During the "Venom War" storyline, Silver Sable is persuaded by Dominic Fortune to reactivate the Wild Pack and recruits Lightbright, Puma, Tarantula, Crippler, Lina Abbas, and Navvab Tadjvar. After Tadjvar is bitten by a Zombiote, the Agony symbiote abandons him, triggering a failsafe that kills Tadjvar.

== Known members ==
- Silver Sable (Ernst Sablinova) - Along with his twin brother Fritz, Silver Sable is one of the co-founders and leaders of the original Wild Pack. He also served on the 1959 Avengers team.
- Silver Sable (Silver Sablinova) - Silver Sable is the leader of Wild Pack and the daughter of the original Silver Sable.
- Fritz Sablinova - Along with his twin brother Ernst, Sablinova is one of the co-founders and leaders of the original Wild Pack. He is shot and killed by the Foreigner.
- Foxtrot
- Juliet
- Romeo
- Tango
- X-Ray
- Agony (Navvab Tadjvar)
- Flicker (Lina Abbas)

=== Wild Pack's A-Team ===
- Larry Arnold - Arnold is a longtime friend of Raul Quentino. When Quentino is injured and loses the ability to walk, he asks that Arnold take his place on the team.
- Battlestar (Lemar Hoskins) - Battlestar has superhuman strength, speed, agility, durability and reflexes. He is a member of A.R.M.O.R.
- Amy Chen (Amelia Chen) - Chen is a highly skilled assassin.
- Crippler (Carl Striklan) - Crippler is a mercenary and former Hydra member.
- Doug Powell - Powell is a mercenary who tries out for the team in the first issue of Silver Sable & the Wild Pack.
- Raul Quentino - Quentino is a former gang member with electronic skills and abilities. He has built and repaired all of the equipment used by the Wild Pack on their missions. Raul ends up injured enough to be paraplegic in one of the missions.
- Sandman (Flint Marko) - Sandman has the ability to convert his body into sand and shapeshift.

=== Wild Pack's Administration and Support ===
- Lorna Kleinfeldt - Kleinfeldt is the manager of Wild Pack.
- Mortimer - Uncle Morty is the uncle of Silver Sable. He acts as her assistant.
- Samantha Powell - Powell works for the public relations department of Silver Sable International, the corporation that runs Wild Pack.
- Silver Wolf (Andreas Vadas) - Silver Wolf is Silver Sable's right-hand man at Silver Sable International. He betrays the team to a terrorist organization.

=== The Outlaws ===
- Prowler (Hobie Brown) - The Prowler wears a cape that allows flight and gadgets on his wrists and ankles that produce various projectile weapons.
- Puma (Thomas Fireheart) - Puma has the ability to transform into a werecat. He is the CEO of Fireheart Enterprises.
- Rocket Racer (Robert Farrell) - Rocket Racer uses a jet-powered skateboard and wears gloves that can shoot missiles. He is working for Briggs Chemical LLC.
- Sandman
- Will o' the Wisp (Jackson Arvad) - Will o' the Wisp has the ability to control the density of his body.

=== Intruders ===
- Fin - Fin has superhuman strength. He is a member of the Garrison, Vermont's Initiative team.
- Lightbright (Obax Majid) - Lightbright can project heat and light from her body.
- Man-Eater (Malcolm Murphy) - Man-Eater is a humanoid tiger and a member of the Garrison.
- Paladin - Paladin has superhuman strength, speed, agility, durability and reflexes.
- Sandman

=== Freelance ===
- Cat (Shen Kuei) - Cat is an expert in martial arts.
- Deathlok (Michael Collins) - Deathlok is a cyborg who possesses superhuman strength, speed, agility, durability, reflexes, sight and hearing.
- Hawkeye (Clinton Francis Barton) - Hawkeye is a master archer and marksman. He is member of the Avengers, on the staff at the Avengers Academy and a member of S.H.I.E.L.D.'s Secret Avengers.
- Madcap - Madcap has the ability to control people's minds, making them crazy for several minutes. He also has a healing factor.
- Le Peregrine (Alain Racine) - Le Peregrine is an expert in savate (French kickboxing) and wears a flight-suit.
- Paladin
- Prowler
- Rocket Racer
- Sandman
- Spider-Man (Peter Parker) - Spider-Man has superhuman strength, speed, agility, durability, and reflexes. He also possesses the ability to stick to surfaces and has a spider-sense, alerting him to danger. He is member of the Avengers.
- Tarantula (Jacinda Rodriguez) - The daughter of Anton Miguel Rodriguez who is an expert martial artist.

== Other versions ==
An alternate universe iteration of the Wild Pack appears in Ultimate Spider-Man (2000), led by Silver Sable and consisting of Chen, Powell, and Quentino.

== In other media ==
=== Television ===
- The Wild Pack appears in the Spider-Man: The Animated Series five-part episode "Six Forgotten Warriors", led by Silver Sable.
- The Wild Pack appears in Spider-Man (2017), consisting of Silver Sable, Paladin, Puma, and Battlestar.

=== Video games ===
- The Wild Pack appear in Ultimate Spider-Man (2005), led by Silver Sable.
- The Wild Pack appear in Spider-Man: Shattered Dimensions, led by Silver Sable.
