= Puma (character) =

Fictional character in the Marvel Comics universe

- Puma. Art by Clayton Crain.

Publication information
- Publisher: Marvel Comics
- First appearance: The Amazing Spider-Man #256 (Sept. 1984)
- Created by: Tom DeFalco (writer); Ron Frenz (artist)

In-story information
- Alter ego: Thomas Fireheart
- Species: Human mutate
- Team affiliations: Assassins Guild; Daily Bugle; Fireheart Enterprises; MODOK's 11; Outlaws; Wild Pack
- Abilities: Expert hand-to-hand combatant; Skilled businessman; Access to advanced technology; Use of personalized Lear Jet; As Puma: Superhuman strength, speed, stamina, durability, agility, reflexes, healing, and longevity; Superhumanly acute senses; Razor-sharp claws and fangs

Puma is a character appearing in American comic books published by Marvel Comics. Created by Tom DeFalco and Ron Frenz, he first appeared in The Amazing Spider-Man #256 (September 1984), as an adversary of the superhero Spider-Man. Despite this, the character does not lack morals or a sense of justice, and eventually reforms and becomes an ally of Spider-Man. Puma is the alter ego of Thomas Fireheart, a Native American who was bred to be a perfect warrior prophesied to stop a future threat that might destroy the world, gaining the ability to transform into an anthropomorphic mountain lion. He later became a businessman and the CEO of Fireheart Enterprises, as well as a mercenary.

== Publication history ==
Puma first appeared in The Amazing Spider-Man #256 and was created by Tom DeFalco and Ron Frenz. The inspiration for the character comes from safari cards bought by DeFalco.

In the Puma's earliest appearances, he acted as a mercenary, and an antagonist to Spider-Man, but soon came to respect him. Puma was then depicted as an ally of Spider-Man, assisting him on several occasions during The Spectacular Spider-Man series. He was associated with the superhero team known as the Outlaws for a time, and was later one of the main characters in the MODOK's 11 limited series.

== Fictional character biography ==
Thomas Fireheart is of Native American descent and belongs to a tribe who foretold the coming of a powerful being who may destroy the world for generations. Long ago, they began making preparations for this coming doom, creating a perfect warrior using mysticism and selective breeding. Fireheart is the latest in this line of men. Despite not believing in the prophecy, Fireheart takes his duties as protector seriously, training in martial arts and mastering his ability to transform into a humanoid cat.

Fireheart becomes the owner and CEO of Fireheart Enterprises. Headquartered near his tribe in Hartsdale, Arizona, it is a multinational corporation involved in many different endeavors, with regional offices around the world. After becoming bored with corporate life, Fireheart becomes a mercenary to seek greater challenges.

Rose hires Puma to kill Spider-Man, but he is thwarted by the Black Cat. He again attempts to attack Spider-Man, but changes his mind and departs when he witnesses Spider-Man saving innocent bystanders.

During the "Secret Wars II" storyline, Puma confronts the Beyonder in New York, but is transported to Tokyo. He obtains a state of "harmonious enlightenment with the universe" and gains vast mystic powers, but soon loses them due to self-doubt. Later, Puma learns Spider-Man's secret identity and attempts to offer him a job at his company, but he refuses. Puma also attempts to clear Spider-Man of a crime he did not commit, during which he meets Silver Sable and the Outlaws.

When Puma's friend Charles Little Sky manifests mutant teleportation abilities, he attempts to help him master them. Rejecting Fireheart's offers of aid, Little Sky flees to Ellis Island, where Puma travels to find him. When Portal's powers activate again and return the U-Foes to Earth, Puma is forced to work with the Avengers as Puma to protect Little Sky, helping to defeat the villains.

Fireheart purchases 51% of the Daily Bugle, makes Robbie Robertson publisher, and begins a pro-Spider-Man campaign in the publication, in an attempt to pay off his debt of honor. He eventually sold the Daily Bugle back to J. Jonah Jameson for $1, and he and Spider-Man settled their debt of honor on a vision quest in New Mexico.

Fireheart agrees to join Spider-Man's rag-tag superhero group called the Outlaws, along with several other Spider-Man adversaries-turn-allies (including Sandman, Rocket Racer, and Prowler). The group clashed with the Avengers, until it was revealed that both groups were actually being manipulated by the shapeshifting Space Phantom, whom Thomas exposed and defeated.

Fireheart's Puma persona later consumes him and he attempts to assassinate a US Senator. Spider-Man stopped him, but not before the NYPD shot Fireheart several times. Black Crow casts a spell that erases Fireheart's knowledge of Spider-Man's identity. He is nursed back to mental and physical health by Nocturne.

Fireheart is accused of federal bribery (which appears to be a frame job) and his assets are frozen. Forbidden by his tribe from taking any contract kills, he joins MODOK's 11 to get the cash he needs to defend himself in court. However, he is soon stripped of his powers due to disobeying the tribal council's order to remain on the reservation. Deadly Nightshade later injects him with a serum that restores his powers.

== Powers and abilities ==
Puma possesses a number of superhuman attributes that are a result of a combination of genetic engineering and mysticism. Thomas Fireheart is the latest in a line of Native Americans that were specially matched and bred to produce a perfect human being. That genetic manipulation was enhanced by an unknown supernatural process through which his tribe endowed him with magical abilities.

Puma can transform into an anthropomorphic feline form at will, gaining superhuman physical abilities and senses. He is a skilled martial artist and experienced businessman with access to advanced technology and resources.

== Other versions ==
=== Earth-001 ===
Fireheart, a member of the Hounds inspired by Puma, appears in the Spider-Verse storyline. He is sent to hunt and kill Miles Morales before being killed by the Superior Spider-Man, Spider-Punk, and Assassin Spider-Man.

=== Secret Wars ===
A zombified alternate universe version of Puma from Earth-13264 appears in Red Skull (vol. 2) #1.

== In other media ==
- Puma makes a non-speaking appearance in the Spider-Man episode "Take Two". This version is a member of the Wild Pack who wields a clawed gauntlet on his left hand.
- Puma appears as a boss in the Game Boy Advance and PC versions of Spider-Man 2, voiced by Dee Bradley Baker.
- Puma received an action figure as part of the Marvel Legends line.
