= Si Don Chai =

Sin Don Chai is the name of two subdistricts in Thailand:

- Si Don Chai, Chiang Khong
- Si Don Chai, Thoeng
