= Rim Khong =

Rim Khong ริมโขง
- Tambon
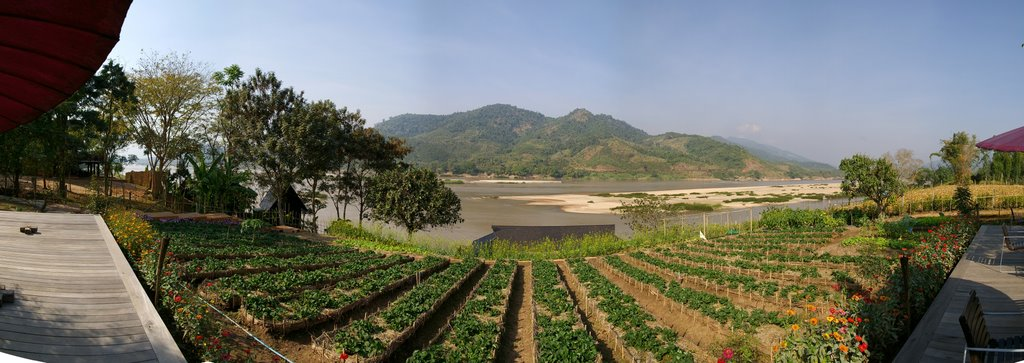
- The Mekong in Rim Khong
- Interactive map of Rim Khong
- Country: Thailand
- Province: Chiang Rai
- District: Chiang Khong

Population (2015)
  - Total: 7,055
- Time zone: UTC+7 (ICT)
- Postal code: 57140
- TIS 1099: 570310

Rim Khong (Thai: ริมโขง; lit. "By the Mekong") is a tambon (subdistrict) of Chiang Khong District, in Chiang Rai Province, Thailand. In 2015 it had a population of 7,055 people.

== History ==
The subdistrict was created effective 19 June 1990 by splitting off five administrative villages from Wiang.

== Administration ==
=== Central administration ===
The tambon is divided into 10 administrative villages (mubans).

No.	Name	Thai
1.	Ban Hat Bai	บ้านหาดบ้าย
2.	Ban Mueang Kan	บ้านเมืองกาญจน์
3.	Ban Don Thi	บ้านดอนที่
4.	Ban Mai Charoen	บ้านใหม่เจริญ
5.	Ban Song Phi Nong	บ้านสองพี่น้อง
6.	Ban Kio Kan	บ้านกิ่วกาญจน์
7.	Ban Huai Yen	บ้านห้วยเย็น
8.	Ban Hat Sai Thong	บ้านหาดทรายทอง
9.	Ban Muang Kan	บ้านม่วงกาญจน์
10.	Ban Kio Doi Luang	บ้านกิ่วดอยหลวง

=== Local administration ===
The area of the subdistrict is covered by the subdistrict administrative organization (SAO) Rim Khong (องค์การบริหารส่วนตำบลริมโขง).
