= Fin (character) =

The Fin is the name of two fictional characters appearing in American comic books published by Marvel Comics. The Golden Age Fin has elements of both the swashbuckling pirate and superhero genres.

== Publication history ==
Stories about the first Fin initially appeared in Daring Mystery Comics #7-8, (April 1941, Jan.1942) and, in issue #9 (April 1942) as well after the title's name change to Comedy Comics; The Fin was created by Bill Everett. Decades later, Rick Jones summons a simulacrum of the Fin, along with the Blazing Skull, the Patriot, and the Golden Age Angel and Vision, to aid the Avengers in The Avengers #97 (March 1972). In 2004, the Fin was revived by Marvel Comics and appeared as one of the allies of the Invaders in that team's series The New Invaders #2-3 (Nov.-Dec. 2004), #6 (March 2005), and #8-9 (May–June 2005). He was in the (unfinished) miniseries All-Winners Squad: Band of Heroes as a member of the Crazy Sues, a unit of Allied men with special abilities during World War II. The Fin received an entry in The Official Handbook of the Marvel Universe Golden Age (2004).

== Fictional character biography ==
=== Fin (Peter Noble) ===
The Fin
- The Fin makes his first appearance (upper left). From Daring Mystery Comics #7

Publication information
- Publisher: Marvel Comics
- First appearance: Daring Mystery Comics #7 (April 1941)
- Created by: Bill Everett (writer/artist)

In-story information
- Alter ego: Peter Noble
- Team affiliations: United States Navy; Invaders; Initiative
- Partnerships: Namor; Namora; Namorita
- Abilities: Superhuman strength and speed Underwater adaptation Wields magical cutlass that can cut through nearly anything and stops aging process

Peter Noble was an officer of the United States Navy who was caught in a sinking submarine and was shocked to find that the immense pressure and lack of air did not kill him. He discovered an undersea civilization called Neptunia, and after several adventures on and under the sea he was made the Neptunians' ruler.

At some unknown point he met, fell in love with and married Nia Noble, who became his Queen and co-ruler. Half a century later, he was called back to America and recalled to active duty as an admiral in command of a new vessel, the Infiltrator. This ship was no ordinary battleship; it had been designed by Bruce Dickson, the Thin Man, using technology from an advanced civilization. Infiltrator was capable of taking shortcuts through space, in theory making it undetectable and uncatchable. Noble and his wife came aboard and ran the ship's day-to-day operations, with the vessel acting as a base for the New Invaders team of superhuman operatives in their battle against the Neo-Nazi group Axis Mundi. In the end, the vessel was destroyed and the Invaders members went their separate ways. Admiral Noble once again returned to Neptunia with his bride to take up his duties as ruler.

=== Wild Pack version ===
The second Fin is a character originally from the 1990s series Silver Sable and the Wild Pack. Although he initially disputed the name Fin when pressed to reveal his real identity by fellow Intruder Sandman, he begrudgingly accepted the moniker others had given him.

He is later seen as a member of the Garrison, the Vermont Fifty State Initiative superhero team, joined by fellow Intruders and Wild Pack alumni Man-Eater.

== Powers and abilities ==
The first Fin has twenty times normal human strength and is able to survive the crushing pressures of the ocean's depths. He can breathe air or water, and can swim as fast as a torpedo. However, if not immersed in water, his strength gradually weakens. The Fin is armed with a magical cutlass, able to cut through nearly anything. The cutlass's magic also prevents him from aging.

The second Fin has uncharted superhuman strength as well as the ability to send out a signal toward any object one hundred times a second, possibly a form of sonar, used for echolocation.

== Other versions ==
In the Ultimate Marvel reality (Earth-1610), Fin is an amphibious villain and a member of the Serpent Skulls gang.
