= Bun Rueang =

Coordinates: 19°59′38″N 100°20′18″E

Bun Rueang บุญเรือง
- Tambon
- Interactive map of Bun Rueang
- Country: Thailand
- Province: Chiang Rai
- District: Chiang Khong

Population (2005)
  - Total: 7,054
- Time zone: UTC+7 (ICT)

Bun Rueang (Thai: บุญเรือง, pronounced [būn rɯ̄a̯ŋ]) is a tambon (subdistrict) of Chiang Khong District, in Chiang Rai Province, Thailand. In 2005, it had a population of 7,054 people. The tambon contains 10 villages.
