= Kangaroo (character) =

Supervillain from the Marvel Universe

Kangaroo is the name of two supervillains appearing in American comic books published by Marvel Comics. Both are noted for their leaping ability similar to that of the Australian Kangaroo.

== Publication history ==
The Frank Oliver version of Kangaroo was introduced in The Amazing Spider-Man #81 in 1970.

The Brian Hibbs version of Kangaroo was first seen in Cage #13 in 1993 and made his debut in The Spectacular Spider-Man #242 in 1997.

== Fictional character biography ==
=== Frank Oliver ===
The Kangaroo
- The Kangaroo (Frank Oliver) makes his first appearance from The Amazing Spider-Man #81.

Publication information
- Publisher: Marvel Comics
- First appearance: The Amazing Spider-Man #81 (Feb. 1970)
- Created by: Stan Lee; John Buscema; Jim Mooney; John Romita Sr.

In-story information
- Alter ego: Frank Oliver
- Species: Human
- Abilities: Professional boxer Peak physical condition Air jet implants grant: Superhuman strength in his legs Ability to leap great heights and distances

Frank Oliver was born in Sydney, Australia. As a young man, he studied kangaroos in his native Australia. Oliver lived, ate and traveled with the kangaroos, developing a leaping ability that rivaled the animals he studied. Seeing an opportunity to make money, Oliver decided to parlay his new-found leaping abilities into a boxing career. His superior speed and agility allowed him to best opponents time and again. During one match, Oliver jump-kicked one opponent in the face, severely injuring his opponent. Facing criminal charges, Oliver fled to the United States. Once he arrived, he was discovered without a passport and held for deportation.

Rather than be deported, Oliver escapes and embraces a life of crime, calling himself Kangaroo. Oliver attacks several guards and steals a briefcase containing only a vial. While Kangaroo pockets the vial, thinking it to contain jewels, the vial actually contains an experimental bacteria which would unleash a devastating plague if released. Kangaroo is unhappy with his small amount of loot and seeks out another target. While attacking a group of people for their money, Kangaroo encounters Spider-Man and lost the vial. While Spider-Man is busy returning the vial, Kangaroo escapes.

Oliver is approached by Jonas Harrow, who gives him air jet-enhanced leaping and punching ability. Harrow intends to use Kangaroo as muscle, but Kangaroo refused and left to pursue Spider-Man. Kangaroo battles Spider-Man and gains the upper hand, but Harrow activates an implant in Kangaroo's brain. Forced by Harrow to obey or suffer agony, Kangaroo returned and was then ordered to retrieve a radioactive isotope. While breaking into the Hudson River lab which held the isotope, Oliver once again encountered Spider-Man. As the two battled, Spider-Man attempted to convince Kangaroo of the isotope's radiation's dangers. Refusing to listen to his enemy, Kangaroo burst into the room which held the isotope and was reduced to a pile of ashes upon exposure to the radiation.

=== Brian Hibbs ===
The Kangaroo

Publication information
- Publisher: Marvel Comics
- First appearance: (Pictured); Cage #13 (April, 1993) (Actual appearance); The Spectacular Spider-Man #242 (January, 1997)
- Created by: (Pictured); Marc McLaurin; Scott Benefiel (Actual appearance); J. M. DeMatteis; Luke Ross

In-story information
- Alter ego: Brian Hibbs
- Species: Human
- Team affiliations: Corporation; Legion of Losers; Sinister Sixteen
- Partnerships: Jonas Harrow; Grizzly; Spot; Gibbon
- Notable aliases: Billy Bob Jenks
- Abilities: Master hand to hand combatant Peak physical condition Armored suit grants: Enhanced strength, agility and endurance Semi-prehensile tail Pouch-level cannon Ability to leap great distances

Brian Hibbs is the second person to take on the Kangaroo identity. Though not from Australia, Hibbs idolized the original Kangaroo, going so far as to spend years studying Frank Oliver's exploits and begin imitating his predecessor's speech and style. Hibbs adopted Oliver's costume and appearance, but decided against confronting Spider-Man. To better prepare himself to avenge his idol, Hibbs secures a job working for the Corporation as one of their agents, based out of Taylor, Mississippi. While bounding through New York City, Hibbs is knocked out by a single punch from Spider-Man.

After escaping from custody, Hibbs spends a sizable amount of his trust fund to purchase kangaroo-themed armor from the "Sharper Villain Catalogue". The armor enhances his strength and leaping ability, as well as provided him with a semi-prehensile tail and a pouch-level cannon. However, Spider-Man easily defeats Hibbs by webbing up the cannon, causing it to explode.

Hibbs allies with Grizzly, Spot, and Gibbon as the Spider-Man Revenge Squad. Of his three teammates, Kangaroo finds himself most in-line with the Spot as both want to pursue wealth from robberies rather than attack Spider-Man as Gibbon and Grizzly both wanted. Upon encountering Spider-Man again, the team receives the moniker "Legion of Losers" and is almost defeated by Spider-Man, but Kangaroo and Gibbon manage to subdue Spider-Man. Following the fight, Grizzly and Gibbon have a change in heart and wished to return their stolen goods and go straight. Spot and Kangaroo, however, disagreed with their teammates, causing a conflict that ends with Kangaroo being knocked out.

Once out of prison, Kangaroo tries to further emulate his idol by gaining superhuman powers. As a result, his stature increased with a corresponding decrease in his mental faculties. As a result, he attempts to make a name for himself by playing baseball and shunning the supervillain lifestyle. Taking the name Billy Bob Jenks, Kangaroo becomes a professional baseball player until his identity is revealed, resulting in his expulsion from the major leagues. Turning back to the supervillain path, Kangaroo is incarcerated in the Cage, a prison where superhuman powers are dampened. Once again following his idol's path, Kangaroo trains to become a master combatant.

During the "Civil War" storyline, Hibbs attends an underworld summit held by Hammerhead. In this appearance, he looks much as he did in his earlier appearances, implying that he lost his superhuman strength along with his malformed features.

== Powers and abilities ==
The Frank Oliver version of Kangaroo had his natural abilities enhanced by Jonas Harrow's implants connected to his nervous system, giving him superhuman strength in his legs and the ability to leap great heights and distances. He was also trained as a professional boxer.

The Brian Hibbs version of Kangaroo is a master hand-to-hand combatant and in peak physical condition. His armor gives him increased physical abilities, the ability to leap great distances, a stomach-mounted cannon, and a semi-prehensile tail.

== Reception ==
- In 2020, Comic Book Resources (CBR) ranked Kangaroo 2nd in their "Spider-Man: 10 Weirdest Animal Villains From The Comics That We'd Like To See In The MCU" list.
- In 2022, Screen Rant included Kangaroo in their "10 Spider-Man Villains That Are Smarter Than They Seem" list.
- In 2022, CBR ranked Kangaroo 5th in their "Spider-Man's 10 Funniest Villains" list.

== Other versions ==
=== Spider-Man: The Manga ===
An original, unidentified incarnation of Kangaroo appears in Spider-Man: The Manga #1. This version is a wrestler and wanted criminal who fled to Japan to avoid prosecution.

=== Ultimate Marvel ===
An alternate universe version of Frank Oliver / Kangaroo appears in the Ultimate Marvel universe. This version is a gang leader.

== In other media ==
- The Frank Oliver incarnation of Kangaroo makes non-speaking appearances in X-Men: The Animated Series.
- The Brian Hibbs incarnation of Kangaroo makes a non-speaking appearance in the Ultimate Spider-Man episode "The Vulture".
