= Jonas Harrow =

Marvel Comics supervillain

Publication information
- Publisher: Marvel Comics
- First appearance: The Amazing Spider-Man #114 (October 1972)
- Created by: Gerry Conway; John Romita Sr.

In-story information
- Species: Human
- Team affiliations: Roxxon Oil
- Abilities: Genius-level intellect

Jonas Harrow is a supervillain appearing in American comic books published by Marvel Comics. The character is usually depicted as an enemy of Spider-Man.

== Publication history ==
Jonas Harrow's first appearance was in The Amazing Spider-Man #114 (October 1972), and he was created by Gerry Conway and John Romita Sr. Conway recounted that the idea for the character "derived from the first Spider-Stalker story [sic; Conway is referring to the Spider-Slayer story from The Amazing Spider-Man #25], with the scientist who provides Jonah a machine to attack Spider-Man himself. I thought, 'Let's extend that. What if there's a guy out there who basically provides the goods for these guys?' I also realized a lot of Spidey's villains themselves, unless they had been scientists, were not likely to come up with this stuff themselves. ... I thought of Jonas Harrow as a Tony Stark for bad guys".

The character subsequently appears in The Amazing Spider-Man #126 (November 1973), #204 (May 1980), #206 (July 1980), #219 (August 1981), Spider-Man: Hobgoblin Lives #1-2 (January–February 1997), New Avengers #33 (October 2007), House of M: Avengers #1 (January 2008), and Spider-Man: Brand New Day - EXTRA!! (September 2008).

Jonas Harrow received an entry in the All-New Official Handbook of the Marvel Universe A-Z #5 (2006).

== Fictional character biography ==
Over two decades ago, Jonas Harrow was disgraced as a surgeon and expelled from the medical profession for unorthodox experiments. Happening upon a near-dead criminal in the Bowery, Harrow, entertaining half-hearted hopes of redemption, cybernetically restored the criminal, who became the gangster Hammerhead. Harrow slid deeper into underworld research, eventually seeking mind-controlling technology.

In the present day, Harrow enhances criminals to superhuman status for a fee. When Hammerhead rises to prominence, Harrow observed his ex-patient's battles with Spider-Man, whom he perceives as a challenge. He enhances another criminal, Kangaroo (Frank Oliver), who ungratefully scorns Harrow's schemes. Harrow continues providing services to villains like Living Laser. When Will o' the Wisp seeks to have his powers removed, Harrow implants a surgical device to extort him into theft.

When the Wisp rebels while fighting Spider-Man, Harrow's device temporarily dissipates him. Using stolen information, Harrow develops a "variator ray" to control human emotion. By now obsessed with Spider-Man, he tested the device on J. Jonah Jameson, who has a nervous breakdown. After Spider-Man locates and destroys the ray, Harrow is imprisoned in Ryker's Island.

Harrow accepted a Roxxon Oil contract to create synthetic automated soldiers; to this end, he extorts industrial crimes from Will o' the Wisp. Surreptitiously seeking Spider-Man's help, the Wisp instead encounters Spider-Man's clone Ben Reilly, who removes Harrow's implant. When Harrow releases Dragon Man from custody, Reilly and the Wisp follow and destroy Harrow's base.

Jonas Harrow is hired by the Hood to take advantage of the split in the superhero community caused by the Superhuman Registration Act. When the Hood is defeated by the New Avengers and loses his powers, Harrow attempts to use a power drainer he created as a bargaining chip to replace the Hood among Norman Osborn's Cabal. The Hood soon returns, having gained new powers from the Norn Stones, and blasts Harrow's head off with a magically-charged bullet.

== Skills and abilities ==
Jonas Harrow is a genius in the fields of cybernetics, genetics, mechanics, and surgery. He requires medication for a heart condition.

== Other versions ==
An alternate universe version of Jonas Harrow appears in House of M as one of several scientists who experimented on Luke Cage.
