= Khrueng =

Coordinates: 20°04′11″N 100°24′20″E

Khrueng ครึ่ง
- Tambon
- Interactive map of Khrueng
- Country: Thailand
- Province: Chiang Rai
- District: Chiang Khong

Population (2005)
  - Total: 7,024
- Time zone: UTC+7 (ICT)

Khrueng (Thai: ครึ่ง) is a tambon (subdistrict) of Chiang Khong District, in Chiang Rai Province, Thailand. In 2005 it had a population of 7,024 people. The tambon contains 11 villages.
