= Huai So =

Coordinates: 20°03′13″N 100°16′58″E

Huai So ห้วยซ้อ
- Tambon
- Interactive map of Huai So
- Country: Thailand
- Province: Chiang Rai
- District: Chiang Khong

Population (2011)
  - Total: 12,239
- Time zone: UTC+7 (ICT)
- TIS 1099: 570305

Huai So (Thai: ห้วยซ้อ) is a tambon (subdistrict) of Chiang Khong District, in Chiang Rai Province, Thailand. The main settlement of the subdistrict is also named Huai So.

== Administration ==
The area of the subdistrict forms a Subdistrict Municipality (thesaban tambon) as its local government. In 1995 it was established as a tambon administrative organization (TAO) and upgraded to a municipality in 2007.

The subdistrict is divided into 23 administrative villages (mubans).

No.	Name	Thai
1.	Ban Huai So Nuea	บ้านห้วยซ้อเหนือ
2.	Ban Huai So Tai	บ้านห้วยซ้อใต้
3.	Ban Kaen Nuea	บ้านแก่นเหนือ
4.	Ban Kiang Nuea	บ้านเกี๋ยงเหนือ
5.	Ban Kaen Tai	บ้านแก่นใต้
6.	Ban Kiang Tai	บ้านเกี๋ยงใต้
7.	Ban Si Wilai	บ้านศรีวิไล
8.	Ban Noen Sombun	บ้านเนินสมบูรณ์
9.	Ban Mai Don Kaeo	บ้านใหม่ดอนแก้ว
10.	Ban Wiang Mok	บ้านเวียงหมอก
11.	Ban Wiang Thong	บ้านเวียงทอง
12.	Ban Rong Hua Fai	บ้านร้องหัวฝาย
13.	Ban Kaen Nakhon	บ้านแก่นนคร
14.	Ban Kaen	บ้านแก่น
15.	Ban Phu Wiang	บ้านภูเวียง
16.	Ban Chai Phatthana	บ้านชัยพัฒนา
17.	Ban Kiang	บ้านเกี๋ยง
18.	Ban Phatthana Rung Rueang	บ้านพัฒนารุ่งเรือง
19.	Ban Kaset Sombun	บ้านเกษตรสมบูรณ์
20.	Ban Kaen Charoen	บ้านแก่นเจริญ
21.	Ban Si Rom Yen	บ้านศรีร่มเย็น
22.	Ban Wiang Kham	บ้านเวียงคำ
23.	Ban Kaen Salong Kham	บ้านแก่นสะลองคำ
