= Chiang Khong district =

District of Thailand

Chiang Khong เชียงของ
- District
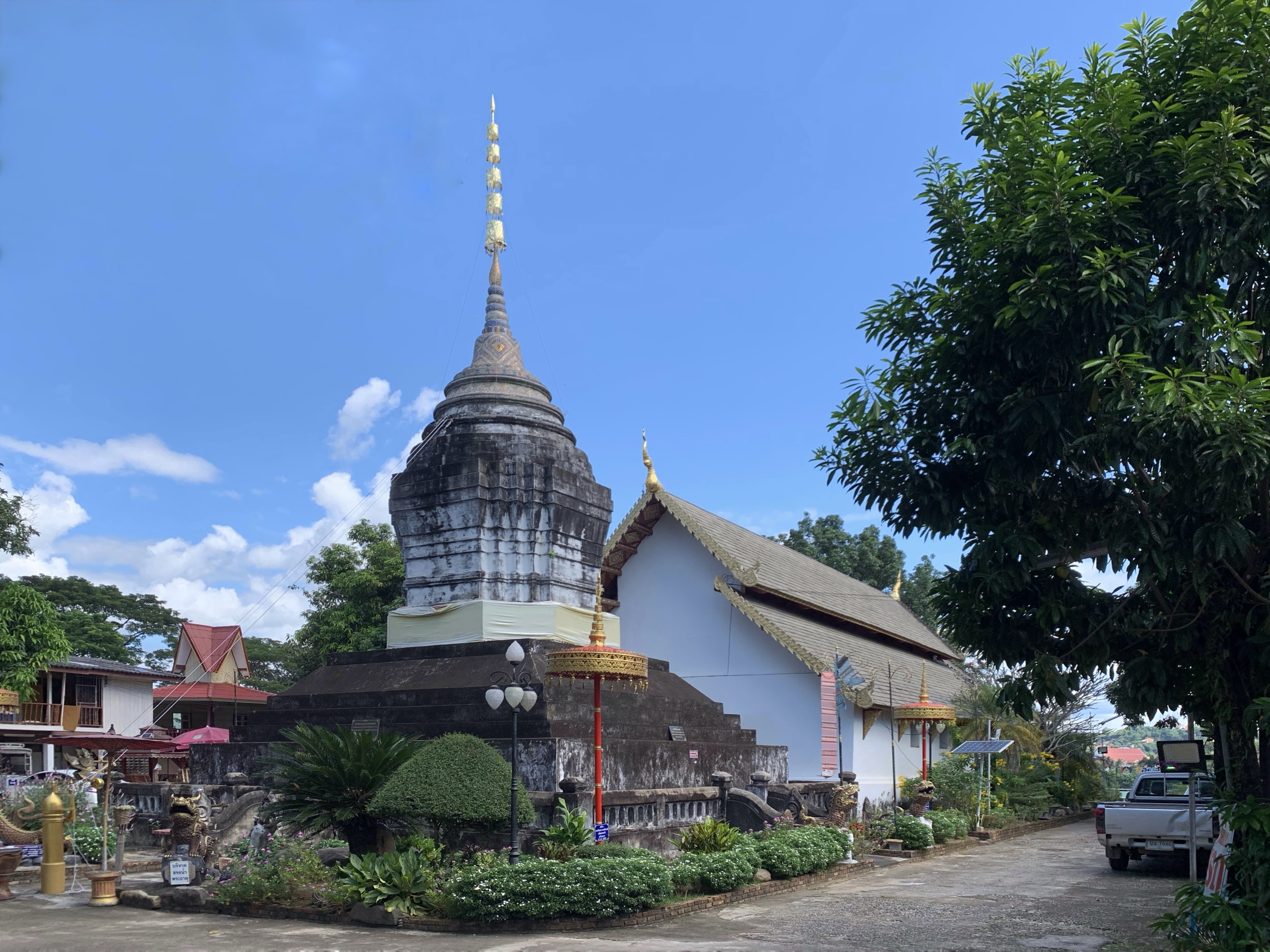
- Wat Phra Kaeo, Chiang Khong

- District location in Chiang Rai province
- Coordinates: 20°15′36″N 100°24′24″E
- Country: Thailand
- Province: Chiang Rai
- Seat: Wiang
- Subdistricts: 7
- Mubans: 102

Area
  - Total: 836.9 km^{2} (323.1 sq mi)

Population (2015)
  - Total: 64,197
  - Density: 76.1/km^{2} (197/sq mi)
- Time zone: UTC+7 (ICT)
- Postal code: 57140
- Geocode: 5703

Chiang Khong (Thai: เชียงของ, pronounced [tɕʰīaŋ kʰɔ̌ːŋ]; Northern Thai: ᨩ᩠ᨿᨦᨡᩬᨦ, pronounced [tɕīaŋ kʰɔ̌ːŋ]) is a district (amphoe) located in the northeastern part of Chiang Rai province, northern Thailand, with its seat being Wiang. The district borders six other districts in Chiang Rai province, with its north and northeast being bounded by the Mekong River, being connected to Laos on the other side by the Fourth Thai–Lao Friendship Bridge.

== History ==
After the defeat of Shan rebels in the Ngiao rebellion and the loss of their base of operations in Phrae in 1902, some Shans decided to regroup around Chiang Saen - in Chiang Saen district - and Chiang Khong on the Lao side when it was a demilitarized territory part of Siam. After countless raids in Chiang Khong, the local chief stepped down in early 1904 and was replaced by a Shan. However, Chiang Khong descended into anarchy by May under the rule of the Shans. When the rest of Laos was handed over to the French, the Siamese got permission to enter the previous demilitarized zone and defeat the Shans, where they easily captured back Chiang Khong with no resistance.

== Geography ==
The Phi Pan Nam mountains and their wide intermontane basins dominate the landscape of the district. The 1,328 m high Doi Luang Pae Mueang massif (ดอยหลวงแปเมือง) rises west of Chiang Khong town. The Mekong River flows at the northern end of the district, partially forming the boundary with Laos. Another important river is the Ing, a tributary of the Mekong.

Neighboring districts are (from the southeast clockwise): Wiang Kaen, Khun Tan, Phaya Meng Rai, Wiang Chiang Rung, Doi Luang and Chiang Saen of Chiang Rai Province. To the east is Bokeo province of Laos.

== Administration ==
=== Central administration ===
Chiang Khong is divided into seven subdistricts (tambons), which are further subdivided into 102 administrative villages (mubans).

No.	Name	Thai	Villages	Pop.
1.	Wiang	เวียง	14	13,391
2.	Sathan	สถาน	16	9,428
3.	Khrueng	ครึ่ง	11	6,571
4.	Bun Rueang	บุญเรือง	10	6,262
5.	Huai So	ห้วยซ้อ	23	12,563
8.	Si Don Chai	ศรีดอนชัย	18	8,927
10.	Rim Khong	ริมโขง	10	7,055

Missing numbers belonged to the tambons which now form Wiang Kaen District.

=== Local administration ===
There are seven subdistrict municipalities (thesaban tambons) in the district:

- Bun Rueang (Thai: เทศบาลตำบลบุญเรือง) consisting of subdistrict Bun Rueang.
- Wiang Chiang Khong (Thai: เทศบาลตำบลเวียงเชียงของ) consisting of parts of subdistrict Wiang.
- Wiang (Thai: เทศบาลตำบลเวียง) consisting of parts of subdistrict Wiang.
- Khrueng (Thai: เทศบาลตำบลครึ่ง) consisting of subdistrict Khrueng.
- Huai So (Thai: เทศบาลตำบลห้วยซ้อ) consisting of subdistrict Huai So.
- Sathan (Thai: เทศบาลตำบลสถาน) consisting of subdistrict Sathan.
- Si Don Chai (Thai: เทศบาลตำบลศรีดอนชัย) consisting of subdistrict Si Don Chai.

There is one subdistrict administrative organization (SAO) in the district:

- Rim Khong (Thai: องค์การบริหารส่วนตำบลริมโขง) consisting of subdistrict Rim Khong.
