= Prowler (Marvel Comics) =

Marvel Comics character

- The Hobie Brown incarnation of Prowler as depicted in The Amazing Spider-Man #78 (November 1969). Art by Jim Mooney.

Publication information
- Publisher: Marvel Comics
- First appearance: Hobie Brown: The Amazing Spider-Man #78 (November 1969); Second Prowler: Peter Parker, the Spectacular Spider-Man #47 (October 1980); Rick Lawson: The Sensational Spider-Man #16 (May 1997); Aaron Davis: Ultimate Comics: Spider-Man #1 (November 2011); Hobie Brown (Clone): The Amazing Spider-Man Vol. 4 #17 (August 2016); Miles G. Morales: Spider-Man: Across the Spider-Verse (June 2023)
- Created by: Hobie Brown: Stan Lee (writer); John Buscema (co-artist); Jim Mooney (co-artist); John Romita Jr. (idea); Second Prowler: Stan Lee (writer); Steve Ditko (artist); Rick Lawson: Todd DeZago (writer); Mike Wieringo (artist); Aaron Davis: Brian Michael Bendis (writer); Sara Pichelli (artist); Hobie Brown (Clone): Dan Slott (writer); R.B. Silva (artist); Miles G. Morales: Phil Lord; Christopher Miller; David Callaham

In-story information
- Species: Human
- Team affiliations: Hobie Brown: Defenders; The Outlaws; Wild Pack; Parker Industries; Aaron Davis: Sinister Six
- Notable aliases: Hobie Brown: Hornet; Aaron Davis: Iron Spider
- Abilities: Technological genius; Skilled hand-to-hand combatant; Use of hypnotic aids and conventional hand-held weapons; Battle suit grants: Wall crawling; Gliding via cape; Titanium-laced claws; Gauntlets capable of shooting compressed air blasts, sleeping pellets and other projectiles

The Prowler is an alias used by several fictional characters appearing in American comic books published by Marvel Comics. These characters are primarily depicted as wearing a green and purple battle suit with a cape and clawed gauntlets.

The original version, Hobie Brown, (Note: Since the creation of the alternate reality Hobie Brown variant, "Hobart Brown / Spider-Punk", in 2015 by Dan Slott and Olivier Coipel, Hobie Brown's full name is occasionally depicted as also being "Hobart Brown", in particular in Amazing Spider-Man vol. 5, though normally spelled as "Hobert Brown" with an "e".) was created by Stan Lee, John Buscema and Jim Mooney, based on a drawing by 13-year-old John Romita Jr., who also named the character. The character was introduced in The Amazing Spider-Man #78 (November 1969) as an adversary to the superhero Spider-Man. An African-American teenage prodigy, Hobie created the Prowler technology to operate as a petty thief, but following his encounter with Spider-Man, he was convinced to turn his life around. Since his redemption, Hobie has served as a valuable ally to Spider-Man, as well as a superhero in his own right, leading the 1994 limited series Prowler.

Additionally, several other characters have used the Prowler alias and technology in the mainstream Marvel universe, including an unnamed self-titled "Second Prowler" (created by Lee and Steve Ditko) and medical intern Rick Lawson (created by Todd DeZago and Mike Wieringo). A clone of Hobie Brown (created by Dan Slott and R.B. Silva) serves as the lead character of a second Prowler limited series, which ties in with the 2016–2017 storyline "Dead No More: The Clone Conspiracy". In the alternate Ultimate Marvel universe, the Prowler identity is assumed by Aaron Davis, a career criminal and the uncle of Miles Morales / Spider-Man. Created by Brian Michael Bendis and Sara Pichelli and introduced in Ultimate Comics: Spider-Man #1 (November 2011), Davis was later incorporated into the primary Marvel continuity following Secret Wars as a separate Prowler operating independently from the others.

Both Hobie Brown and Aaron Davis have appeared in several media adaptations outside of comics, including films, animated series, and video games. Davis is portrayed by Donald Glover in the live-action Marvel Cinematic Universe (MCU) film Spider-Man: Homecoming (2017) and voiced by Mahershala Ali in the animated film Spider-Man: Into the Spider-Verse (2018). Additionally, both actors make cameo appearances in the animated film Spider-Man: Across the Spider-Verse (2023), in which Jharrel Jerome also voices Miles G. Morales, an original incarnation of the Prowler who will return in Spider-Man: Beyond the Spider-Verse (2027).

== Publication history ==
The debut of the Prowler (Hobie Brown) in The Amazing Spider-Man #78 (November 1969). Art by John Romita Sr.

The original incarnation of the Prowler, Hobie Brown, debuted in The Amazing Spider-Man #78 (November 1969) and was created by writer Stan Lee and artists John Buscema and Jim Mooney. The character eventually appeared in his own solo comic, The Prowler. The character was inspired by Romita's 13-year-old son John Romita Jr., who sketched a villain called the Prowler. Lee liked the name but not the costume; Romita combined the name with a design he had previously intended for a character called the Stalker that was intended for the never-published The Spectacular Spider-Man #3.

Since Hobie, several other characters have taken up the Prowler identity. The second version first appeared in Peter Parker, The Spectacular Spider-Man #47 (October 1980), and was created by Stan Lee and artist Steve Ditko. The third version, Rick Lawson, first appeared in The Sensational Spider-Man #16 (May 1997) and was created by writer Todd DeZago and artist Mike Wieringo.

The Ultimate Marvel iteration of Prowler, Aaron Davis, first appeared in Ultimate Comics: Spider-Man #1 (November 2011) and was created by writer Brian Michael Bendis and artist Sara Pichelli.

The fourth Prowler in the mainline Earth-616 continuity is a clone of Hobie Brown, who first appeared in The Amazing Spider-Man Vol. 4 #17 (August 2016) and was created by Dan Slott and R.B. Silva. He later served as the protagonist of the "Dead No More: The Clone Conspiracy" tie-in limited series Prowler, published from October 2016 to May 2017.

== Fictional character biography ==
=== Hobie Brown ===
Hobie Brown is the original incarnation of the Prowler. Born in the Bronx, he was a bright but angry African-American teenager who was fired from his window washer job. Intending to use his engineering skills for personal profit, he devises a plan to steal items while disguised as a supervillain and then return said items as Hobie. Donning his green and purple Prowler costume for the first time, Hobie sets out to rob the payroll office of the Daily Bugle, figuring that this will garner him quick publicity. However, he is caught in the act by Peter Parker. While struggling with Parker, he draws editor J. Jonah Jameson's attention. Parker, with no way to defeat Prowler without giving away his own secret identity, allows himself to be thrown through a window during the struggle, and saves himself once he is outside. Traumatized by the events, Hobie makes his escape to the building's roof, only to be confronted by Spider-Man. Spider-Man unmasks Hobie, but realizes he is just a misunderstood kid like Peter once was. Instead of handing him over to the police, he advises him to rethink his life.

Hobie takes Spider-Man's advice to heart and gives up his criminal ways. He later impersonates Spider-Man at the hero's request – Spider-Man wearing a webbing mask – to convince Peter's friends that he was not Spider-Man after Peter 'confessed' the truth while delirious from a flu. Hobie is convinced that Spider-Man was involved somehow in police captain George Stacy's death, and unsuccessfully tries to bring Spider-Man to justice. Hobie eventually marries his love Mindy McPherson and settles down into a career as a construction worker.

Hobie begins to look after his 'little brother' Manuel "Manny" Lopez as a part of the Big Brother Program. When Manny is murdered, Prowler believes that White Tiger (Hector Ayala) was responsible and attempts to bring White Tiger to justice. Prowler attempts to join the super-hero group the Defenders, only to be tossed into the harbor by Valkyrie, at which point he decides to retire the Prowler identity. His Prowler equipment is stolen by a cat burglar to commit crimes for fashion criminal Bella Donna. Hobie is eager to join the search for the thieves, but Spider-Man insists that he stay home so he would not get into trouble, since the second Prowler had committed a felony murder. When Spider-Man defeats the second Prowler, the stolen equipment is returned to Hobie.

Prowler later appears in California during Peter's Webs book deal. He is first seen attacking the Black Fox (Raul Chalmers) for possession of a chalice to keep Mindy out of prison. Mindy accepts a bookkeeping job at Transcorp New York. The company has been caught in shady stock deals, and Mindy is set up and blamed for the crimes. Seeing it as the only way to clear Mindy's name, Hobie re-dons his Prowler costume and finds the books which Mindy had been blamed for stealing. He hides the books on an information chip and puts the information chip on the chalice, where no one would look for it. Prowler and Spider-Man then team up to take on the Black Fox and reclaim the chalice. Hobie vindicates his wife of stock fraud charges with the help of Spider-Man and Black Fox.

Prowler later attempts to vindicate Spider-Man of a crime and first encounters Silver Sable and the Outlaws (including rehabilitated villains Sandman, Rocket Racer and Puma). His safety designs are stolen by Justin Hammer. Hobie proves the design's flaws during an encounter with Hammer's hirelings. Hobie assists the Outlaws on several occasions before formally joining them to rescue the kidnapped daughter of a Canadian official.

Later, Hobie is paralyzed during the Great Game. In follow-up appearances, he begins regaining movement of his paralyzed limbs. It is suggested that his paralysis is a result of mental rather than physical damage, as he was feeling frustrated over the recent theft of his costume, eventually regaining full mobility. While recovering, Hobie provides Spidey with a jetpack used when assuming the Hornet identity during the Identity Crisis storyline.

Prowler is captured by S.H.I.E.L.D. in Ms. Marvel's Civil War tie-in. Escaping incarceration, he attends the wake for Stilt-Man (Wilbur Day), along with many other villains and former villains. Prowler narrowly escapes injury as Spider-Man and Puma escort him from the wake shortly before it is bombed by the Punisher.

When Peter Parker elevates Parker Industries into a global franchise with Spider-Man officially acting as a "bodyguard" as part of the All-New, All-Different Marvel branding, Hobie Brown is hired to act as Spider-Man in situations where the public would expect to see Peter and Spider-Man in the same place. Following a fight against Zodiac's Pisces Sect, Peter tells Hobie to change into his Prowler costume and that they will retrieve the Webware together before Zodiac undoes his encryption.

Before The Clone Conspiracy storyline and crossover, wanting to know more about New U Technologies, Peter sends Prowler to infiltrate. He ends up encountering Electro (Francine Frye). Prowler is chased around by Electro and is accidentally killed. In the aftermath, Rita Clarkson takes Spider-Man to where people who were subjected to the New U Technologies treatment are being held. The Prowler is among these people, as it is revealed that turned out that the Prowler who died was a clone. Julia Carpenter later talks to the real Prowler, who has just emerged from cryo-sleep, and tells him about his clone's actions. Hobie is then seen talking to Peter about his future, wondering which direction he will take. He heads home, where he is last seen conflicted about his own identity.

Hobie next attacks the F.E.A.S.T. center, which had been re-established by May Parker. He tells Spider-Man that he was investigating a crowdfunding group called Fairgray Pay after he funneled some money to help a sick friend, which never reached him, and broke into the center since it is almost wholly funded by the group. He and Spider-Man break into the company's head office with help from Marnie, Peter's neighbor known also as The Rumor. After an intense battle, Spider-Man, Prowler and Rumor escape, with help from Captain America. Prowler is left in his home after being knocked out from the fight. He later wakes up to find that Spider-Man managed to defeat the head of Fairgray Pay with help from Iron Man, who bought out the company. During their conversation, Prowler is offered a job as the new head of Fairgray Pay, which he quickly accepts.

During the "King in Black" storyline, Hobie is shown to have taken up the alias of Hornet during the Symbiote invasion.

During the "Gang War" storyline, Hobie as Hornet had heard about Aaron Davis' exploits as Prowler. He has him operate as Prowler again by giving him one of his Prowler costumes to find out what Hobgoblin has planned for Brooklyn. Hobie warns Aaron that if he slips up, he will repossess the Prowler identity.

=== Second Prowler ===
At one point, the criminal Bella Donna (Narda Ravanna) stole Hobie Brown's costume and equipment and hired a cat burglar that Spider-Man had fought a long time ago to become the new Prowler. During one of his crimes, Prowler accidentally kills a guard. Furthermore, the witnesses see his silhouetted profile and believe Spider-Man to be implicated in the murder. Eventually, Spider-Man captures both Bella Donna and the Prowler, clears both his and the original Prowler's name, and returns Hobie's stolen equipment.

=== Rick Lawson ===
Rick Lawson is the third incarnation of Prowler. A medical intern, he was present when Hobie Brown was brought into the hospital where he worked due to a back injury. The costume was partly cut away to conceal Hobie's superhero identity, but his friends were unwilling to risk moving him due to the back injury, leading to Lawson finding a portion of the costume that was left unattended and deducing Hobie's identity. After finding Hobie's address from his medical files, Lawson steals a replica of the Prowler costume, using new tech to both rob patients in the ICU and get revenge on those who had "wronged" him in the past, such as a construction foreman who fired him when needing the job to complete medical school. He has an encounter with the Vulture, who seeks revenge against the original Prowler and nearly kills him, but Spider-Man interferes and defeats Vulture. Afterwards, Lawson is taken to the hospital and the Prowler costume is returned to Hobie (who is still recovering from paralysis).

=== Aaron Davis ===
The Ultimate Marvel incarnation of Prowler is Aaron Davis, the uncle of Miles Morales and the brother of Jefferson Davis.

Whereas Jefferson reformed by marrying Rio Morales, Aaron never came around and became the cat burglar "Prowler." In his first appearance, he breaks into Oscorp's abandoned lab to steal a small red box and other rare items from a safe but Oscorp's genetically altered spider crawls into his duffel bag without his knowledge. Miles later visits his uncle's apartment and is bitten by Oscorp's spider. After Miles passes out and regains consciousness, Jefferson forbids Aaron to spend time with Miles on account of his criminal life. During a visit to Mexico City, Aaron fights off the Mexican crime boss Scorpion. When his deal with Scorpion goes bad, he is detained by Mexican authorities. Returning to New York, Prowler interrogates the Tinkerer who he kills while realizing his nephew is Spider-Man. He then claims various tech for himself: an electric suit, a winged suit and electric gauntlets. Davis uses his winged suit in a vain attempt to kill Scorpion. The next day, Aaron confronts his nephew about being Spider-Man. Davis initially convinces Spider-Man to assist in defeating Scorpion, however, Spider-Man comes to the realization of his uncle's exploitation. When Miles decides to sever their relationship, Aaron threatens to tell Jefferson and Rio of his nephew's secret identity. Spider-Man ultimately gets into a fight with Aaron that results in Aaron's gauntlets exploding, killing him but not before accusing his nephew of being just like him.

Sometime after the "Secret Wars" storyline, Aaron is seen on Earth-616 alive and well. Equipped with a recolored version of the Iron Spider armor, he forms a version of the Sinister Six and manages to have a reunion with Spider-Man trying to stop him. Despite Spider-Man's attempts, the Sinister Six carry out Aaron's heist and take off aboard a decommissioned Helicarrier. When the Champions interrupt a meeting, Spider-Man attempts to persuade his uncle to give up his criminal ways. Although the chaos results in his apparent death, Aaron is later revealed to be alive, seemingly having followed his nephew's advice.

After escaping from Ultimatum, Miles' burner clones, and Ultimatum's henchmen, Spider-Man and Prowler run into the Green Goblin and the Goblinoids. As Spider-Man and Prowler fight the Goblinoids, the Goblin states that a pulse will go off, causing anyone who took the Goblinoid drug to transform into a Goblinoid. As Jefferson shows up to aid Captain America in fighting the Goblinoids, Bombshell and Starling catch up to Spider-Man and Prowler just as the Goblin catches up to them at Prospect Park. Ultimatum, his henchmen, and the Goblinoids attack Spider-Man, Captain America, Jefferson, and Prowler. The Goblin recovers and attacks Prowler as Ultimatum plans to send Spider-Man back to Earth-1610. Prowler sacrifices himself to give off a reverse ionic pulse explosion by overloading his suit. This returns Ultimatum and the Goblin to Earth-1610 and returns the Goblinoids to their human forms, while the remaining henchmen of Ultimatum flee.

After Miles and his clone Shift free Quantum from Assessor's control, they learn that Aaron is alive somewhere in a different universe and discover Assessor's connection to the Beyond Corporation. Aaron is trapped in a dystopian alternate future and captured by an alternate version of Miles' clone Selim who killed his reality's Miles. After Ganke Lee sacrifices himself to prevent Selim from destroying New York, Aaron, Miles and Shift remain for a while to assist in rebuilding efforts before returning to their home universe.

During the "Gang War" storyline, Aaron Davis is approached by Hobie Brown, who has learned of his exploits as Prowler. After giving Aaron a copy of one of his Prowler costumes, Hobie asks him to find out what Hobgoblin is planning for Brooklyn. If he slips up, Hobie will take the Prowler identity from Aaron. Hobgoblin and Prowler sell weapons to the Enforcers in order to sway them to Hobgoblin's side. Prowler accompanies the Enforcers to Sheepshead Bay, where they encounter Miles and the Cape-Killers. After being subdued, Prowler explains his motives for helping Hobgoblin to Miles. Prowler accompanies Miles, Gust, and Ms. Marvel while the others fight Hobgoblin's hired muscle.

=== Hobie Brown (Clone) ===
The fourth iteration of Prowler native to Earth-616 is a clone of Hobie Brown. The Jackal cloned Hobie, with all of his memories apparently intact. After learning about the Jackal's mission, Prowler became loyal to him and started acting as a spy to find out what Parker Industries was up to. It is revealed that this Prowler is a clone that Jackal had gathered to grow clones with false memories that span all the way to their deaths.

Prowler's body starts failing due to not taking specialized pills for an extended period of time, as he questions what he's doing with his life. He is then confronted by Electro. Prowler tries to escape Electro's wrath in Alcatraz, which proves difficult with Electro's powers and his dying body. Using his weapons, the gift shop and his strategic thinking, Prowler manages to defeat the simple-minded Electro. When he makes it outside, he is found by Julia Carpenter, who takes him on a boat and heads towards New U Technologies to retrieve his pills.

When the Jackal orders the villains in the "Haven" part of New U Technologies to kill Spider-Man, Prowler works with Spider-Man to fight the villains off. When the alarm goes off and all the clones start breaking down from clone degeneration, Prowler leaves Haven and tries to find the individual who set off the system that has been killing the clones. Prowler accuses Julia of being the culprit. He tries to fight Julia, who is left with no choice but to fight back. She then knocks him down as Prowler's body continues deteriorating.

The Prowler clone assists Jean DeWolff's clone in helping Spider-Man get away from the villains. During the final battle, Prowler and DeWolff battle the villains outside. Hobie's body is rapidly decaying, but the two receive assistance from Gwen Stacy of Earth-65 and Kaine Parker. Gwen leaves Hobie in an alley when he proves too weak to continue and he is found by Electro. Julia arrives and fends Electro off as Hobie is told that Spider-Man stabilized the human and clone cells. When Electro gets the upper hand on Julia, Prowler sacrifices himself to stop Electro and dies in Julia's arms.

== Powers and abilities ==
The Prowler's various iterations have no superhuman powers, although Hobie Brown is naturally inventive, especially in the field of pneumatics despite no formal education in that science. Each one relies on a suite of technical gimmicks. Prowler wears modified coveralls interwoven with denim and stretch fabric, equipped with gas cartridge bracelets and anklets capable of propelling projectiles at high velocity. Their arsenal of projectiles include steel darts ("flechettes"), gas pellets, small explosives, magnesium flares and cleaning fluid. Prowler has been known to use hypnotic aids and conventional hand-held weapons. Each wears steel-tipped gauntlets for scaling walls and shock absorbent foam rubber insulated boots. He also wears a cape which contains a network of pneumatic filaments which expand with air to give it a rigid structure, allowing him to glide for short distances.

A technological genius, Hobie Brown has also designed the cybernetically-controlled wing harness used by Hornet (Peter Parker during Identity Crisis), although he himself was unable to use it due to the weight. He is a skilled hand-to-hand combatant, possessing a green belt in taekwondo.

== Reception ==
In 2022, Screen Rant included Prowler in their "10 Best Marvel Characters Who Made Their Debut In Spider-Man Comics" list.

== Other versions ==
=== Amazing Spider-Man: Renew Your Vows ===
An alternate universe version of Hobie Brown / Prowler from Earth-18119 appears in Amazing Spider-Man: Renew Your Vows. This version is a member of S.H.I.E.L.D.'s resistance against Regent.

=== House of M ===
An alternate universe version of Hobie Brown from Earth-58163 appears in House of M. This version is a member of Luke Cage's resistance.

=== Marvel Zombies ===
A zombified alternate universe version of Hobie Brown / Prowler from Earth-2149 appears in Marvel Zombies.

=== Spider-Gwen ===
An alternate universe version of Hobie Brown from Earth-65 appears in Spider-Gwen. This version is a member of the Yancy Street Gang.

=== Spider Hero ===
An alternate universe version of Hobie Brown from Earth-14029 appears in Secret Wars. This version is a member of Ho Yinsen's Defenders who assumed the Spider-Man mantle following the death of his universe's Peter Parker and resides in the Battleworld domain of Yinsen City.

=== Spider-Punk ===
The Earth-138 version of Hobie Brown operates as Spider-Man, though he is referred to as Spider-Punk due to his punk rock-inspired design. Initially referred to as Hobart Brown to distinguish him from his primary continuity counterpart, he was renamed "Hobie" following the release of Spider-Man: Across the Spider-Verse.

== In other media ==
=== Television ===
- The Hobie Brown incarnation of the Prowler appears in a self-titled episode of Spider-Man: The Animated Series, voiced by Tim Russ. This version initially works for the crime lord Iceberg, but feels he is not getting his fair share and starts stealing from him. Upon discovering this, Iceberg orders his men to kill him. After getting into an argument with his girlfriend Angela over his criminal lifestyle, Hobie attempts to rob Mary Jane Watson, but is stopped by Spider-Man and sent to jail for violating his parole. While he is incarcerated, Hobie saves Richard Fisk from an attempt on the latter's life. As a reward, the Kingpin arranges for Hobie's release and provides him with the Prowler battlesuit. While taking it on a trial run, Hobie re-encounters Spider-Man, whom he evades before exacting revenge on Iceberg. However, Hobie soon discovers that his Prowler suit has to be recharged and it can only be done by the Kingpin, who demands that Hobie begin working for him in return. To ensure Hobie's loyalty, the crime boss modifies the Prowler suit to electrocute him if he tries to disobey and its belt to detonate if tampered with. Hobie seeks out Spider-Man's help and the two join forces to defeat the Kingpin and fix the Prowler suit, allowing Hobie to safely remove it. Afterwards, he reconciles with Angela and gives up his life of crime.
- Hobie Brown appears in The Spectacular Spider-Man, voiced by Charles Duckworth. This version is a classmate of Peter Parker, a friend of Flash Thompson, a student at Midtown High, and a member of the school's football team.
- The Hobie Brown incarnation of the Prowler appears in Spider-Man (2017), voiced by Nathaniel J. Potvin. This version acquired his Prowler equipment from his brother Abraham Brown.

=== Film ===
- Aaron Davis appears in the Marvel Cinematic Universe (MCU) film Spider-Man: Homecoming (2017), portrayed by Donald Glover, who was cast in the role partly because he had indirectly helped create Miles Morales' character. This version is a low-level criminal with a sense of morality. While attempting to buy high-tech firearms from Herman Schultz and Jackson Brice, the deal is interrupted by Spider-Man. In an attempt to learn more about Adrian Toomes' plans, Spider-Man later confronts Aaron and webs his hand to his car. Aaron provides information about a sale with his former acquaintance Mac Gargan and admits to wanting to keep the weapons off the streets to protect his nephew. Spider-Man then departs, thanking Aaron for his help but leaving him trapped as punishment for his crimes. In a deleted post-credits scene, Aaron unsuccessfully tries to get the webbing off using his keys and calls his nephew to say that he will not be able to make it to an event he promised to attend.
  - Aaron Davis makes a live-action cameo appearance in the animated film Spider-Man: Across the Spider-Verse (see below), portrayed again by Donald Glover. As of this film, he has become the Prowler, but was displaced from his native reality and captured by the Spider-Society.

Aaron Davis as he appears in Into the Spider-Verse

- The Aaron Davis incarnation of the Prowler appears in Spider-Man: Into the Spider-Verse (2018), voiced by Mahershala Ali. This version shares a close bond with Miles Morales, encouraging his nephew to pursue his passions, and leads a double life as the Prowler, one of the Kingpin's enforcers. While Aaron's estranged police officer brother Jefferson Davis is initially unaware of the former's criminal affiliations, he is still unhappy about Miles and Aaron spending time together, believing the latter is a bad influence. After discovering Miles is the new Spider-Man, Aaron refuses to kill him, leading to the Kingpin killing Aaron in retaliation. Jefferson initially mistakes the new Spider-Man for Aaron's killer and seeks revenge, but eventually learns the truth following the Kingpin's arrest.
- An alternate universe version of Aaron Davis from Earth-42 appears in Spider-Man: Across the Spider-Verse (2023), voiced again by Mahershala Ali. Additionally, an original incarnation of the Prowler in the form of Earth-42's Miles Morales (voiced by Jharrel Jerome) appears as well.

=== Video games ===
- The Hobie Brown incarnation of the Prowler appears as a playable character in Spider-Man: Friend or Foe, voiced by Chris Gardner. This version is a superhero who wields explosive canisters instead of clawed gauntlets and lacks a cape.
- The Hobie Brown and Aaron Davis incarnations of the Prowler appear as playable characters in Spider-Man Unlimited.
- The Aaron Davis incarnation of the Prowler appears as a playable character in Marvel Puzzle Quest.
- The Aaron Davis incarnation of the Prowler appears in Insomniac Games' Spider-Man series, voiced by Ike Amadi. This version obtained his Prowler technology from Roxxon, for whom he conducted several illegal jobs in the past. Jefferson Davis eventually discovered his brother's secret identity, but agreed not to arrest him on the condition that Aaron cease his criminal activity and stay away from Jefferson's family.
  - Aaron first appears as a boss in Marvel's Spider-Man: Miles Morales. Following Jefferson's death, Aaron, racked with guilt over not being able to reconcile with his brother, becomes overprotective of his nephew Miles. He also tries to turn his life around, taking a job as a subway worker until discovering that Miles has become the new Spider-Man. Determined to protect him, Aaron takes up the Prowler mantle again and strikes a deal with Roxxon to help them find the Tinkerer in exchange for the company leaving Spider-Man alone; however, Simon Krieger reneges and captures both. After Miles escapes from Roxxon, Aaron kidnaps him to prevent him from endangering himself, but his nephew defeats him and explains it is his duty to protect New York. Inspired, Aaron helps Miles evacuate Harlem amidst the Tinkerer's revenge plot against Roxxon and later turns himself in, testifying against Roxxon and Krieger in exchange for a reduced sentence.
  - Aaron returns in Marvel's Spider-Man 2. Now on parole, he has permanently retired as the Prowler and asks Miles to locate hidden tech stashes before Kraven's Hunters do; all throughout, Aaron tells Miles of his early work as the Prowler and his history with Jefferson. It is later revealed that Rio Morales has forgiven Aaron and helped co-sign a lease on an apartment one floor above her and Miles, allowing them to reconnect as a family.
- The Hobie Brown incarnation of the Prowler appears in Marvel Snap.

=== Miscellaneous ===
The Hobie Brown incarnation of the Prowler appears in a self-titled comic strip in The Amazing Spider-Man. This version's gauntlets are restricted to using compressed air blasts.

== Collected editions ==
Title	Material collected	Published date	ISBN
Prowler: The Clone Conspiracy	Prowler (vol. 2) #1–6	July 2017	978-1302906559
