= Gregory Wright (comics) =

American comic book editor, writer and colorist

- Born: December 22
- Areas: Writer, Editor, Colourist
- Awards: Comics Buyer's Guide Fan Awards, 1990, 1996

Gregory Wright (born December 22) is an American comic book editor, writer, and colorist known for his work on such Marvel Comics characters as Spider-Man, the Defenders, the Fantastic Four, Deathlok, and Silver Sable, and such DC Comics characters as Superman and Batman.

== Biography ==
Wright grew up in New Castle, Pennsylvania, and went to film school in New York. In 1986, thanks to the recommendation of his good friend (and fellow aspiring filmmaker) D.G. Chichester, and while "editing two films and attempting four separate screenplays," Wright was hired as a secretary for the Marvel imprint Epic Comics. After working with Epic for six months, Wright was hired as Marvel editor Mark Gruenwald's assistant editor.

Since then, Wright has worked primarily as a freelance writer and colorist. Some of the titles he has written for include Deathlok, Silver Sable and the Wild Pack, and Morbius, the Living Vampire, all of which he also colored. Wright has spent long stints as a colorist on titles like Ghost Rider, Marvel Comics Presents, and Spider-Man for Marvel; and Batman, Nightwing, Starman, Teen Titans, and The Titans for DC Comics.

With artist Jackson Guice, Wright created the character Crippler in Daredevil Annual #7 (1991). Along with artist Steven Butler, Wright created the character Man-Eater in Silver Sable and the Wild Pack #8 (Jan. 1993).

== Awards ==
- Wright was given the Comics Buyer's Guide Fan Award for Favorite Colorist in both 1990 and 1996.

== Bibliography ==
=== Writer ===
- Sensational She-Hulk #9 (Marvel, Dec. 1989) – co-written with Richard Starkings
- Deathlok Limited Series #1–4 (Co-written with Dwayne McDuffie) #1, 6–10, 17–22, 26–29, 31–34; Annual 1–2 (Marvel Comics, 1991–1994)
- Nick Fury, Agent of S.H.I.E.L.D. #42–47 (Marvel Comics, 1993)
- Silver Sable and the Wild Pack #1–35 (Marvel Comics, 1992–1995)
- Morbius, the Living Vampire #9–23 (Marvel Comics, 1993–1994)
- The Punisher: No Escape graphic novel (Marvel Comics, 1990)
- The Punisher Annual Volume 2 #2–3 (Marvel Comics, 1990–1991)
- Clive Barker's Nightbreed #18–20 (Marvel/Epic Comics, 1992)
- Daredevil #328, 333–337 Annuals 5–10 (Marvel Comics, 1989–1994)
- Cosmic Powers Unlimited #2–5 (Marvel Comics, 1996-1996)
- The Squeeg #1–4 (David Lieto, 2002–2013)

=== Colorist ===
- The Savage Dragon #1–3 (Image, 1992)
- Zero Hour: Crisis in Time #1–5 (DC, 1994)
- X-Men: The Hidden Years #1–22 (Marvel Comics, Dec. 1999 – Sept. 2001)
- Elephantmen #9, 16, 17, 22–26 (Comicraft/Image, 2007–2010)
