= Will o' the Wisp (comics) =

Publication information
- Publisher: Marvel Comics
- First appearance: The Amazing Spider-Man #167 (April 1977)
- Created by: Len Wein (writer); Ross Andru (artist)

In-story information
- Alter ego: Jackson Arvad
- Species: Human mutate
- Team affiliations: Roxxon Energy Corporation; Exterminators; The Outlaws
- Partnerships: Jonas Harrow; Scarecrow; Molten Man
- Notable aliases: The Wisp
- Abilities: Scientific genius Density control Flight; Hypnosis; Superhuman strength, speed, and durability

Will o' the Wisp (Dr. Jackson Arvad) is a supervillain appearing in American comic books published by Marvel Comics. He is a physicist who gained control over the electromagnetic attraction between his body's molecules, allowing him to adjust his density (like the Vision). He is most often a foe of Spider-Man.

== Publication history ==
The character first appeared in The Amazing Spider-Man #167 (Apr 1977).

== Fictional character biography ==
Jackson Arvad was born in Scranton, Pennsylvania. An employee at the Roxxon Energy Corporation, he works as a scientist in the division dedicated to electromagnetic research. Under constant pressure of being fired, Arvad overworks himself and ends up falling asleep on the job, causing him to be caught in the electromagnetic field of a device he was working on. This weakens the electromagnetic attraction between the molecules in his body, threatening his life. When his boss learns of the accident, he decides to let Arvad die. However, Arvad saves himself after learning to control the level of attraction between his molecules.

Will o' the Wisp is forced by his employer, Jonas Harrow, to carry out criminal activities. Spider-Man persuades him to resist Harrow instead. Will o' the Wisp attempts to kill Harrow multiple times, but is thwarted by Spider-Man.

Will o' the Wisp takes control of Killer Shrike's battle-suit and kidnaps Marla Madison, who restores him to his corporeal form. Will o' the Wisp later forces his former partner, James Melvin, to expose the Brand Corporation's illicit activities to the news media.

Will o' the Wisp encounters the Outlaws while hunting down Spider-Man in connection with a crime. Will o' the Wisp eventually joins the Outlaws as an adventurer, helping to rescue the kidnapped daughter of a Canadian official.

=== Civil War ===
Will o' the Wisp allies with the Scarecrow and later Molten Man as part of the Chameleon's plot to get revenge on Peter Parker after he publicly reveals his identity as Spider-Man during the "Civil War" storyline.

Will o' the Wisp is among the villains who visit the Bar with No Name to attend the wake of Stilt-Man, who was killed by the Punisher. The Punisher attacks the funeral, poisons the guests, then blows up the bar. The victims are treated for severe burns and have the poison pumped from their bodies.

== Powers and abilities ==
After being caught in a "magno-chamber" of his design, Jackson Arvad gained the ability to control the electromagnetic particles that make up his body. This enables him to vary the density of his body to make himself intangible or rock-solid. He also has superhuman strength at higher densities, and has superhuman speed and durability. Will-O'-The-Wisp can also mesmerize people for a short period of time.

Jackson Arvad is a skilled scientist, especially in the field of electromagnetics, with a master's of science degree in electrical engineering.
