= Sathan =

Coordinates: 18°16′N 100°43′E

Sathan สถาน
- Tambon
- Interactive map of Sathan
- Country: Thailand
- Province: Chiang Rai
- District: Chiang Khong

Population (2005)
  - Total: 9,453
- Time zone: UTC+7 (ICT)

Sathan (Thai: สถาน, pronounced [sā.tʰǎːn]) is a tambon (subdistrict) of Chiang Khong District, in Chiang Rai Province, Thailand. In 2005 it had a population of 9,453 people. The tambon contains 16 villages.
