= Wiang, Chiang Khong =

Coordinates: 20°16′19″N 100°21′39″E

Wiang, Chiang Khong เวียง
- Tambon
- Interactive map of Wiang, Chiang Khong
- Country: Thailand
- Province: Chiang Rai
- District: Chiang Khong

Population (2005)
  - Total: 12,311
- Time zone: UTC+7 (ICT)

Wiang, Chiang Khong (Thai: เวียง) is a tambon (subdistrict) of Chiang Khong District, in Chiang Rai Province, Thailand. In 2005 it had a population of 12,311 people. The tambon contains 14 villages.
