= Si Don Chai, Chiang Khong =

Coordinates: 20°07′48″N 100°21′41″E

Si Don Chai ตำบลศรีดอนชัย
- Tambon
- Interactive map of Si Don Chai
- Country: Thailand
- Province: Chiang Rai
- District: Chiang Khong

Population (2013)
  - Total: 8,813
- Time zone: UTC+7 (ICT)
- Postal code: 57140
- TIS 1099: 570308

Si Don Chai (Thai: ศรีดอนชัย) is a tambon (subdistrict) of Chiang Khong District, in Chiang Rai Province, Thailand. In 2013, it had a population of 8,813 people. The tambon contains 18 villages.
