= Sandman (Marvel Comics) =

Marvel Comics supervillain and antihero

- Sandman as depicted in Thunderbolts #40 (July 2000). Art by Mark Bagley.

Publication information
- Publisher: Marvel Comics
- First appearance: The Amazing Spider-Man #4 (September 1963)
- Created by: Stan Lee; Steve Ditko

In-story information
- Alter ego: William Baker
- Species: Human mutate
- Team affiliations: Sinister Six; Frightful Four; Avengers; Wild Pack; Enforcers; Outlaws; Intruders
- Notable aliases: Flint Marko, Sylvester Mann, Quarryman
- Abilities: Size and mass manipulation; Shapeshifting; Earth manipulation; Superhuman strength, durability and endurance; Density control; Flight (in sandstorm form)

The Sandman (William Baker, a.k.a. Flint Marko) is a character appearing in American comic books published by Marvel Comics. A shapeshifter endowed through an accident with the ability to turn himself into sand, he started out as a recurring adversary to the superhero Spider-Man, but has redeemed himself over time, eventually becoming an antihero. The Sandman has also been an enemy of the Fantastic Four and is a founding member of the supervillain teams the Sinister Six and the Frightful Four.

In 2009, the Sandman was ranked as IGN's 72nd Greatest Comic Book Villain of All Time. The character has been adapted into various other media including films, television series, and video games. In live-action, he was portrayed by Thomas Haden Church in Spider-Man 3 (2007) and the Marvel Cinematic Universe (MCU) film Spider-Man: No Way Home (2021), and by Jack Huston in the television series Spider-Noir (2026). An illusionary creature based on the Sandman appeared in the MCU film Spider-Man: Far from Home (2019).

== Publication history ==
The Sandman first appeared in The Amazing Spider-Man #4 (Sept. 1963), created by writer Stan Lee and artist Steve Ditko as an adversary of Spider-Man. The character returned in The Amazing Spider-Man Annual #1 and The Amazing Spider-Man #18-19, and was soon depicted in other comics, such as The Incredible Hulk and The Fantastic Four.

The Sandman served as the villain of the first issue of the Spider-Man spin-off series Marvel Team-Up (March 1972), which gave him a more morally ambiguous depiction. Writer Roy Thomas later commented, "I've been pleased to see Sandman's gradual redemption, whose seeds perhaps I helped plant in that story. He just seemed to me like a character who might have that in him ..." Subsequent stories stuck with the character's original depiction, but a decade later the more sympathetic portrayal of the Sandman returned, starting with Marvel Two-in-One #86 (April 1982), in which the Sandman is given co-star billing with his nemesis the Thing. The Sandman was later an ally of Spider-Man, as well as a reserve member of the Avengers and a member of Silver Sable's "Wild Pack" team of mercenaries.

Besides being most notable as a Spider-Man supervillain, he has also been depicted as a Fantastic Four antagonist in Stan Lee and Jack Kirby comic books (mostly due to being introduced as a founding member of the original Frightful Four) along with being on the heroic side (being an Avengers reserve member) until being introduced as a tragic supervillain in the Spider-Man comics once again.

== Fictional character biography ==
William Baker was born in Queens, New York. When he was three years old, his father abandoned him and his mother. In these early years, she took her son to Coney Island beach. He lost himself happily in sand sculptures, a craft he would use in secondary school under the encouragement of his teacher (and first crush), Miss Flint.

In preparatory school, a boy named Vic bullied Baker until he learned to fight using an opponent's motions against themselves, a technique he performed as if he "slipped through their fingers like sand". Vic and his buddies eventually befriended Baker. In high school, William played on his school's football team, using the sport to channel his anger. While playing football, he adopted the nickname "Flint", after his former teacher.

After Vic incurs a large gambling debt to a mobster, he begs Flint to fix a football game he bet on to pay off his debt. Flint does, but is kicked off the team after the coach discovers his involvement. The coach taunts Baker, telling him that he will accomplish nothing of importance in his life. Flint hits his ex-coach, resulting in his expulsion from school and the beginning of his life of crime.

His illegal activity increases in depth and scope, turning him into a violent, bitter man. Eventually he ends up in prison on Ryker's Island where he meets his father, Floyd Baker. He is friendly to his father, but does not tell him who he is. He tells Floyd his nickname, Flint, and a false surname, Marko, inspired by his former coach's taunts about not "making a mark" on the world. He uses the alias Flint Marko from that point on (he changed his name also to prevent his mother from discovering he was a criminal). After Floyd is released from prison, Marko escapes.

Marko flees to a nuclear testing site on a beach near Savannah, Georgia where he comes into contact with sand that had been irradiated by an experimental reactor, transforming his body into sand. Impressed, he calls himself the Sandman after his new powers.

Marko clashes with Peter Parker/Spider-Man for the first time in Peter's high school. Spider-Man defeats Marko with a vacuum cleaner and hands it over to the police. The Sandman escapes by getting through his window after turning himself to sand, but is recaptured by the Human Torch after the Torch lures the Sandman to a building by disguising himself as Spider-Man, then activating the sprinkler system. After this Marko resurfaces as a member of the Sinister Six, led by Doctor Octopus. He battles Spider-Man inside an airtight metal box, which is activated when Spider-Man touches a card saying where the Vulture is, but the Sandman is defeated due to Spider-Man having stronger lungs than he does.

Alongside the Enforcers, he captures the Human Torch but later succumbs to Spider-Man and the Torch.

After Spider-Man defeats Marko numerous times, Marko diverts his attention to other superheroes. He teams with the Wizard, Paste-Pot Pete (later known as the Trapster) and Medusa to form the Frightful Four to combat the Fantastic Four, which attacks during Reed and Sue's engagement party. The Fantastic Four, with the help of a few other superheroes, defeat the group. In another battle, in which he teams up with Blastaar and loses against the Four, he dons a diamond-patterned green costume designed by the Wizard. Later, he and the Hulk battle for the first time. The Mandarin joins him in his next conflict against the Hulk.

In time the Sandman discovers—starting with his hands—that his body can transform into glass and back again. He contracts cancer and takes over a medical research center, battling the Hulk again. He battles Wonder Man but is cured of his cancer by radiation.

Afterward, he allies himself with Hydro-Man to battle their mutual enemy, Spider-Man. An accident merges the two villains into a monster called the Mud-Thing. Spider-Man and the police are able to dehydrate the monstrosity. Months later, the supervillains manage to separate themselves and go their separate ways. The time he spent trapped with Hydro-Man caused Marko to question his bad life choices. The Thing, after an aborted attempt to fight Baker, urges him to straighten himself out and use his ability to do good. The story continues when he meets with the Thing for a second time to see a sports game.

Marko boards with the Cassadas and teams with Spider-Man against the Enforcers. The Sandman then makes sporadic appearances in Spider-Man comics assisting his former enemy. His first appearance has him coming to the rescue of Spider-Man and Silver Sable, who are outnumbered and surrounded by the Sinister Syndicate. Silver Sable is impressed by the Sandman's performance and recruits him as a freelance operative. Doctor Octopus coerces him to rejoin the Sinister Six, but Marko turns against them. Doctor Octopus turns him into glass for his treason. Spider-Man, however, saved the Sandman. Sandman also appears as part of the Outlaws, a group of reformed Spider-Man enemies, alongside Prowler, Rocket Racer, Puma, and Will o' the Wisp.

Later, he receives a presidential pardon and briefly joins the Avengers as a reserve member. Later, he becomes a full-time mercenary in the employ of Silver Sable as a member of her Wild Pack, serving alongside heroes such as Paladin and Battlestar. The Sandman is one of the few heroes temporarily overwhelmed by their evil doubles during the Infinity War. This double almost kills them all.

Marko turns against Spider-Man and his sometimes ally the Thing and declares his allegiance to evil and his former employer, the Wizard. This change proved incompatible to what many fans had thought Sandman had become, a hero. This outcry caused Marvel to rush out a story which retconned The Amazing Spider-Man (vol. 2) #4 in which the Wizard had kidnapped the Sandman and used his mind control machine, the Id Machine, to turn him back into a villain.

The machine worked too well and the Sandman went about reforming the Sinister Six to destroy both Spider-Man and Doctor Octopus, only to be double-crossed by Venom, who the Sandman recruited as the sixth member of the team. During Venom's brawl against the Sandman, Venom rips a chunk of sand from the Sandman. This missing sand destabilizes Sandman, causing him to lose his ability to maintain his human form. Before falling into the sewer (and as a nod to fans who rejected Marvel's attempt to re-villainize the character), the Sandman admitted that part of the reason for his fall from grace was the trouble he had to really cope with life on the good guys' side, and asks Spider-Man to tell his mother he was sorry he did not fulfill his promise to her, to be a force for good. The Sandman washes away and slides down a sewer, from which he mixes into Jones Beach, New York and is thought dead.

The Sandman's body and mind are scattered throughout the beach. This separation lasts too long for him, causing his mind to split into good and its opposite, evil, which when dominant created sand vortexes to ensnare beachcombers. Spider-Man arrived to confront the Sandman, ultimately using the Sandman's mental instability to free his captives and cause him to explode.

His sand wafts throughout New York and touches down into piles forming beings that personify him: the good, the bad, the gentle and the innocent. Spider-Man locates these Sandmen to convince them to unify. The Sandman's evil persona merges with his innocent and gentle personas, but the Sandman's good persona rebuffs the evil one. Because the Sandman's mind can handle his personality in separation for only a limited time, he loses his ability to retain himself, crumbling and blowing away, leaving Spider-Man to ponder the nature of his scuttled foe.

The Sandman is one of the villains recruited to recover the Identity Disc, but during its recovery seemingly he is killed in a mutiny. At the series' end, the Sandman is found alive and working with the Vulture to manipulate the other villains.

In the storyline "Sandblasted", in Friendly Neighborhood Spider-Man #17–19 (April–June 2007), the Sandman asks Spider-Man to help him redeem his father, who has been charged with and imprisoned for murdering a homeless man. He admits his father was a petty criminal, but insists he would not commit murder. Marko also said the victim resembles Peter Parker's Uncle Ben, who had been murdered years before then. The Sandman and Spider-Man find the killer, the Chameleon 2211. The Chameleon 2211 kills the Uncle Ben who the Hobgoblin 2211 brought from an alternate universe and had been posing as him after that. Thanks to Spider-Man, Floyd Baker is switched with the Chameleon 2211 and saved, for which the Sandman thanks Spider-Man.

The Sandman returned in "Spider-Man: The Gauntlet" storyline, which redefined the character and his powers/mental state. While investigating a series of murders and a missing girl named Keemia Alvarado, whose mother is a victim of those murders, Spider-Man traces the murders and the abduction to the Sandman, the girl's father, who is hiding on Governor's Island with Keemia. The Sandman's powers have evolved to where he can create duplicates of himself who have their own personalities and, to Marko's shock, claim they committed the murders. Spider-Man sneaks away and uses a fan to obliterate the Sandmen. Originally Spider-Man believed Keemia would be handed to her grandmother, but instead she was sent to a foster home by Child Protective Services. Carlie Cooper is exonerated upon being under police suspicion for tampering with the murder evidences, but the Sandman is still at large.

During the "Origin of the Species" storyline, the Sandman is among the supervillains invited by Doctor Octopus to join his villains' team where he becomes involved in a plot to receive a reward and securing some specific items for him. The Sandman went after Spider-Man for Menace's infant, believing that Doctor Octopus would reward him by reuniting him with Keemia. He ended up being accidentally struck with lightning by Electro, temporarily turning him into fulgurite. Spider-Man goes on a rampage against all the villains after the Chameleon stole the infant and tricked him into believing it had died. At the dock, the Sandman, along with the Shocker and the Enforcers, are hiding. However, Spider-Man collapses the floor of the building which falls into the water. The Sandman attempts to rise to attack, but Spider-Man shoots him using the Shocker's vibrational air-blasts.

In Big Time, he is part of the new Sinister Six along with Mysterio, the Rhino, Doctor Octopus, the Chameleon and Electro. He rises up against Doctor Octopus' plan to detonate New York, saying Keemia is still there. He is later angered when, during a confrontation between the Sinister Six and the Intelligencia, Doctor Octopus teleports the Wizard into the upper atmosphere using the Intelligencia's equipment. The Sandman was talking with his former Frightful Four teammate and old friend at the time. When the Mad Thinker goes after Electro, the Sandman violently attacks him, claiming that he did not want to lose any more friends.

When Doctor Octopus puts his plan into action, the Sandman is satisfied with the job because of the planned 2 billion dollar "compensation fee", which he reasons will help him gain custody of Keemia. However, although sent to guard a facility in the Sahara Desert giving him complete control of the largest body of sand in the world, he is defeated by Spider-Man, the Black Widow and Silver Sable when Spider-Man identifies and isolates the one grain of sand that contains his conscious mind. Spider-Man and Silver Sable then violently interrogate the Sandman to reveal all of Doctor Octopus' secrets to them.

Following the "Dying Wish" storyline, the Sandman's captive form is stolen from the Baxter Building by the Superior Spider-Man (Doctor Octopus' mind in Spider-Man's body) where he takes him to his underwater lab. The Sandman, the Chameleon, Electro, Mysterion (an impersonator of Mysterio), and the Vulture are later seen as part of a team led by the Superior Spider-Man called the "Superior Six". The Superior Spider-Man has been temporarily controlling their minds to redeem them for their crimes. He does this by forcing them to do heroic deeds against their will, some of which almost get some of them killed. Every time he is done controlling them, he puts them back in their containment cells. They eventually break free of the Superior Spider-Man's control and attempt to exact revenge on the wall-crawler, while nearly destroying New York to do so. With the help of Sun Girl, the Superior Spider-Man is barely able to stop the Superior Six.

Inspired by the heroism of the villains who had their moralities inverted by the events of "AXIS", the Sandman rejoins one of his old gangs and breaks into Ryker's Island in search of the group's leader Dixon. Upon reaching Dixon's cell, the Sandman turns on and incapacitates him and his followers. He then leaves with Dixon's cellmate, a "good egg" whom the Sandman had deemed deserving of a second chance.

The Sandman later appears as a member of the Sinister Six led by Aaron Davis in a recolored Iron Spider armor. He accompanied the Sinister Six in a plot to steal a decommissioned S.H.I.E.L.D. Helicarrier.

The Sandman later discovered that he is starting to lose the consistency of his body. When the Mad Thinker and the Wizard are unable to find a solution to counter this and the Sandman is hospitalized after collapsing, he is visited by Spider-Man, who took him to the beach that the Sandman visited in his childhood and stayed with him until his body broke down. After that happened, Spider-Man discovered that the Sandman did not die and that he lost the ability to assume a human shape, where he now sports a blob-shaped body. When the Sandman's body is taken over by a future version of the Sandman from Earth-51838 where the sun went out, Spider-Man received some of the Sandman's powers and used them to defeat the Sandman of Earth-51838 and sends him back to his reality using the Multisect and assistance from the Human Torch. After bidding farewell to Spider-Man, the Sandman left to get adjusted to his new form while having developed a fear of his newly discovered immortality.

At an unknown beach, Sandman regains his human shape, but loses his sense of direction. Doctor Octopus helps Sandman regain his sense of direction, which pleases Kindred.

Following the "Gang War" storyline, Peter Parker encounters Sandman in Ravencroft while he and Mary Jane are visiting Anna Watson. After Peter told him that a mutual friend of theirs told him about Sandman's arrest, Sandman asks Peter to refer to him as William Baker and stated that he turned himself in while noting that he is trying to be good while parts of him are still bad. As Peter mentions that their mutual friend is Spider-Man, Sandman tries to go on a rampage only for a sonic inhibitor to stop him. William states that Flint Marko is the bad part of him. Before Peter leaves, William advises him to inform Spider-Man that "they" will be coming to break Marko out of Ravencroft. Doctor Octopus, Electro, Kraven the Hunter, Mysterio, and Vulture are shown to be the attackers.

== Powers and abilities ==
The Sandman has the ability to transform his body. He can will his body to be hardened, compacted, dispersed or shaped, or a combination of those qualities, an Earth manipulation of sand and rock particles. More often than not in combat, this ability enables him to absorb most blows with little to no ill effect other than reforming himself, a relatively fast action. His striped shirt and cargo pants are colored sand to make him appear as if he wears clothes. Even when soaked, he was able to stretch his sand molecules, growing to double his size.

Sandman can mold his arms and hands into shapes, such as a mace or a sledgehammer, to battle Spider-Man and his other enemies. His mass, strength and shape shifting ability correspond to the number of sand and rock particles that comprise him. The more he incorporates (nearby) sand grains and rock granules into his body, the more those qualities are enhanced. Even though he controls every particle in his body, his mind exists in the astral plane. He can turn himself into a sandstorm, which enables him to fly great distances and to suffocate his enemies.

His body takes on sand's chemical qualities, making him impervious to most other elements. When cement ingredients combine with his body, he hardens as he dries, rendering him immobile. This renders him immobile and vulnerable for a short span of time. In addition to his endurance, the Sandman possesses superhuman strength several times more than Spider-Man's and on a par with the Thing's.

Temperature does alter the Sandman. At 3,400 degrees Fahrenheit his body turns into glass, also a form he can control. Unlike the Sandman's fast transformation from sand to glass, his transformation from glass to sand takes time.

Although he is invulnerable to most physical attacks, even projectiles because they pass through him, water is capable of harming him. There are some exceptions, for example while fighting Venom, the villain's powerful mouth ripped cleanly and swiftly into the Sandman. The amount of sand removed abruptly, and perhaps because of Venom's venoms, left the mass of the Sandman in contortion, crippled beyond immediate repair. The Sandman began to disintegrate, then flowed down a drain, and then washed up onto and into a beach.

It has been revealed that, while the Sandman can absorb and lose sand, his body must retain one key particle of sand that contains his conscious mind, allowing Spider-Man to defeat him once by isolating that one grain from the rest of the Sandman (although the difficulty involved in setting up these events in the first place makes it impractical to use regularly).

=== Equipment ===
In a story where Sandman worked with the Wizard, the Wizard fashioned Sandman a special green armored suit with a belt that contained three buttons that allowed various chemicals to mix into the Sandman's body to enable him to change himself into consistencies related to sand. The armor, like the Sandman's usual "clothes", changed into sand with him. Eventually with the disbanding of the original Frightful Four, the Sandman stopped using the suit.

== Family members ==
- Floyd Baker - The father of William Baker, who was unaware that he was the Sandman during his time in prison.
- Keemia Alvarado - The foster child of Sandman.
- Mrs. Baker (first name unknown) - The mother of William Baker.

== Other characters named the Sandman ==
Several unrelated characters in Marvel Comics have been named "Sandman":

- In Marvel Mystery Comics, the Sandman that appears is the Sandman of legend. He lives in the Land of Dreams, which is located in the Realm of Fairies within the potentially imaginary world of Nowhere. The Sandman ruled over the realm and would place a blanket over it every day. Those who grabbed a dream from the dream tree would have a dream based on whatever they grabbed from the tree and awaken again when the Sandman removed the blanket over his land. Anyone who did not grab a dream would end up in an eternal, dreamless sleep.
- In Journey into Mystery, an alien Sandman crash-landed on Earth, where he ended up in Mexico. The local tribespeople thought it was an evil spirit. They took him while he was still weak from his crash and sealed him in a cave with no air and light, where he remained in a state of suspended animation. By the early 1960s, a vacationing Marine named Steve Bronson and his family accidentally unleashed the alien Sandman on the world. The alien Sandman regained its consciousness, recounted its past to the Bronson family and planned to conquer the Earth. Steve Bronson tried to oppose the alien Sandman, but it proved invulnerable to physical assault. The alien Sandman ordered the Bronsons to transport him to North America, so he could observe the most powerful nation on the planet before putting his plan into action. Steve Bronson was able to alert the military to the alien Sandman's presence, but they also proved ineffective in dealing with the extraterrestrial threat. Bullets went right through him, gas was ineffectual because he does not breathe and while bombs would scatter his pieces, he proved capable of reforming himself afterwards. The alien Sandman planned to increase its size by absorbing every sand on the beaches until nothing can stop him. Steve Bronson's son Bobby heard about the plan and headed to the beach with a plan of his own. Bobby threw a pile of water over the sand, which made the alien Sandman soggy to the point where he could not move. The military quickly transported the alien Sandman's body to a top-secret underground facility where he has remained ever since.
- The Puppet Master and the Mad Thinker created an android version of Sandman to fight the Fantastic Four.
- When Sandman was with the Wild Pack, he fought an imposter Sandman alongside an imposter Doctor Doom. This version sports a mohawk and was created by Magus with help from the other-dimensional being Anthropomorpho.

== Other versions ==
Many alternate universe versions of Sandman have appeared throughout the character's publication history.

=== House of M ===
In House of M, Sandman is a member of Hood's Masters of Evil before he is killed by Rogue and Marrow.

=== Marvel 1602 ===
In Marvel 1602: Fantastick Four, Sandman is a member of the Four Who Are Frightful who possesses dream-manipulating abilities similar to his mythological namesake.

=== Marvel Noir ===
In Marvel Noir, Sandman is an enforcer for the Crime Master who possesses granite-like skin.

=== Ultimate Marvel ===
In the Ultimate Marvel universe, Sandman was given powers by Justin Hammer Jr. amidst a failed attempt at recreating the Super Soldier Serum.

=== Ultimate Universe ===
In the Ultimate Universe imprint, Sandman gained powers after being captured and experimented on by A.I.M.

== In other media ==
=== Television ===
- The Sandman appears in the Spider-Man (1967) episode "Sands of Crime", voiced by Tom Harvey.
- The Sandman appears in The New Fantastic Four (1978) episode "The Frightful Four", voiced by Ted Cassidy. This version is a member of the titular group who sports special armor.
- The Sandman appears in the Spider-Man (1981) episode "The Coming of the Sandman", voiced by Wally Burr.
- The Sandman appears in the Spider-Man and His Amazing Friends episode "Spider-Man: Unmasked!", voiced by Christopher Collins.
- The Sandman was set to appear in Spider-Man: The Animated Series. However, the series' creators did not want to interfere with the continuity of James Cameron's proposed Spider-Man film at the time, in which the Sandman was supposed to appear, and used Hydro-Man in his place. Also due to Cameron's film, the Sandman did not appear in Fantastic Four (1994).
- Flint Marko / Sandman appears in The Spectacular Spider-Man, voiced by John DiMaggio. This version was a petty crook and partner of Alex O'Hirn who works for the crime boss Tombstone before eventually acquiring sand-based powers and becoming an independent criminal to achieve a "big score". After fighting Spider-Man on his own and with two iterations of the Sinister Six, Sandman seemingly sacrifices himself to contain an oil tanker explosion and goes into hiding.
- Flint Marko / Sandman appears in Ultimate Spider-Man, voiced by Dee Bradley Baker. This version is a prison escapee who gained his powers in an explosion, with S.H.I.E.L.D. subsequently abandoning him on a deserted island in the Bermuda Triangle as no ordinary prison could hold him. After encountering him, Spider-Man gradually convinces Sandman to become a hero in later seasons.
- Flint Marko / Sandman appears in a self-titled episode of Spider-Man (2017), voiced by Travis Willingham. This version is a former henchman of Hammerhead and has a daughter named Keemia Marko. After failing Hammerhead too many times, Flint was buried in sand and toxic waste and presumed dead, but was mutated and acquired sand-based powers. Initially incapable of maintaining a humanoid form, Spider-Man helps him stabilize his body before helping him rescue Keemia from Hammerhead.
- The Sandman appears in Spidey and His Amazing Friends, voiced by Thomas F. Wilson.
- Flint Marko / Sandman appears in Spider-Noir, portrayed by Jack Huston. This version is a bodyguard and the lover of Cat Hardy. He was a soldier that was captured during World War I and experimented on the Germans, resulting in his body turning into sand over a decade later. He and other victims of the experiments become enforcers for Silvermane to make a living. He is later cured thanks to the Spider.

=== Film ===
- An original incarnation of the Sandman appears in James Cameron's aborted Spider-Man film script, with Michael Biehn being considered for the role. This version would have been Carlton Strand's henchman Boyd who was mutated by an accident involving Philadelphia Experiment-esque bilocation and atom-mixing.
- Thomas Haden Church portrays Flint Marko / Sandman in two Marvel films. This version is portrayed as a tragic and sympathetic criminal who is desperate to raise money for his critically ill daughter, Penny, and gained his powers after an accident involving an experimental particle accelerator that bonded him with sand at the molecular level. Furthermore, he unintentionally killed Spider-Man's uncle Ben Parker.
  - Marko first appears in the Sony film Spider-Man 3 (2007). After escaping prison, he visits his family, but his upset ex-wife Emma forces him to leave. While on the run from police, he stumbles upon a particle physics test facility that transforms him into the Sandman. Using his newly acquired powers, Marko attacks an armored car and is confronted by Spider-Man, but manages to escape. After Spider-Man obtains his black suit, which increases his aggressiveness, and learns that Marko was Ben's killer, he fights and seemingly kills him in the sewers. Marko later reconstitutes himself and encounters Venom, who persuades him to join forces to kill Spider-Man. They kidnap Mary Jane Watson and lure Spider-Man to a construction site, where they nearly succeed until Harry Osborn intervenes and defeats Marko. Following the battle, Marko, now aware of Spider-Man's identity, approaches him to apologize and come to terms with the truth about Ben's murder: during the robbery, Marko tried to steal Ben's car while holding Ben at gunpoint, but his partner, Dennis Carradine, startled him, causing Marko to pull the trigger by accident. Shocked by what happened, Marko later turned himself in. He reveals to Spider-Man that he had no intention to kill Spider-Man's uncle and remorsefully admits his wrongdoings. Spider-Man forgives Marko and allows him to escape.
  - Church reprises his role in the Marvel Cinematic Universe (MCU) film Spider-Man: No Way Home (2021), with director Jon Watts providing motion capture. Sometime after the events of Spider-Man 3, he ends up in another universe due to a botched spell, where he helps its version of Spider-Man (later dubbed "Peter-One") defeat Electro before being teleported to and imprisoned in the New York Sanctum alongside other alternate universe-displaced supervillains. As his abilities become unstable and he starts to deteriorate, Marko receives a chance at a cure from Peter-One, but is convinced by the Green Goblin to fight back instead. Marko, adamant about returning to his universe, later assists Electro and the Lizard in fighting Peter-One until his version of Spider-Man cures him of his powers before Doctor Strange returns him and the other displaced individuals to their respective universes.
- A member of the Elementals inspired by the Sandman appears in the MCU film Spider-Man: Far From Home. Identified as the Earth Elemental, it had power over rocks and sand. It attacked Mexico, during which it encountered Nick Fury and Maria Hill before Mysterio defeated it off-screen. Spider-Man later discovers the Elementals were illusions created by Mysterio and his fellow ex-Stark Industries employees as part of his plot to obtain Tony Stark's technology and fraudulently establish himself as a superhero.

=== Video games ===
- The Sandman appears in Questprobe featuring Spider-Man.
- The Sandman appears as a boss in Spider-Man vs. The Kingpin.
- The Sandman appears as a boss in Spider-Man: Return of the Sinister Six. This version is a member of the Sinister Six.
- The Sandman appears as a boss in Spider-Man 2: The Sinister Six. This version is a member of the titular team.
- The Sandman appears in Spider-Man 2: Enter Electro, voiced by Daran Norris. This version is an underling of Electro.
- Flint Marko / The Sandman appears in the Spider-Man 3 film tie-in game, voiced by Thomas Haden Church. Similarly to the film, this version is an escaped convict looking to provide for his family and becomes the Sandman after accidentally falling into a pit of sand that scientists were experimenting on while running from the police. However, his identity as Ben Parker's killer is omitted. Additionally, Venom threatens to kill Sandman's daughter unless he helps him kill Spider-Man. After being defeated by Harry Osborn as in the film, Sandman is reunited with his daughter, who had been rescued by the police, and apologizes to Spider-Man before leaving in peace.
- The Sandman, based on Thomas Haden Church's portrayal, appears as a boss and playable character in Spider-Man: Friend or Foe, voiced by Fred Tatasciore. He, among other supervillains, fight Spider-Man until they are all attacked by P.H.A.N.T.O.M.s under Mysterio's command. The Sandman is captured along with the other villains, placed under mind control, and sent to Cairo to retrieve a meteor shard located there. Spider-Man later defeats the Sandman and destroys the mind-control device before the latter joins him to exact revenge on Mysterio.
- The Sandman appears as a boss in Spider-Man: The Battle Within.
- The Sandman appears as an assist character in the PS2 and PSP versions of Spider-Man: Web of Shadows.
- The Sandman appears as a boss in Spider-Man: Shattered Dimensions, voiced by Dimitri Diatchenko. He obtains a fragment of the Tablet of Order and Chaos, which augments his powers to the point where he can control sand by looking at it, but it gradually fractures his mind from overextending himself until Spider-Man eventually defeats him and claims the fragment.
- The Sandman appears as a boss, later unlockable character, in Marvel: Avengers Alliance.
- The Sandman appears as a boss and playable character in Lego Marvel Super Heroes, voiced by Dee Bradley Baker.
- Various alternate reality variants of Sandman appear as bosses in Spider-Man Unlimited, voiced by Travis Willingham. They joined a multiversal Sinister Six to harvest iso-8 crystals.
- The Sandman appears as a playable character in Marvel: Future Fight.
- The Sandman appears as a playable character in Marvel Puzzle Quest.
- The Sandman appears as a playable character in Lego Marvel Super Heroes 2, voiced by John Guerrasio.
- The Sandman appears as a boss in Marvel Ultimate Alliance 3: The Black Order, voiced by Richard Epcar. After escaping from the Raft, he joins the Sinister Six in fighting Spider-Man and the Guardians of the Galaxy, but is ultimately defeated.
- The Sandman appears as the first boss of Spider-Man 2 (2023), voiced by Leandro Cano. This version reformed years prior to spend more time with his daughter Keemia, but Kraven the Hunter and his forces threaten them, forcing Sandman to wreak havoc to evade them and keep Keemia safe until the Spider-Men defeat him. After Sandman warns them about Kraven's plot before being safely taken to the Raft, the Spider-Men discover the former's mind had been fractured, turned into several sand crystals, and scattered across New York City. While collecting the crystals and restoring Sandman's mind, the pair discover what happened to him, ensure Keemia's safety, and use the crystals to make a statue of Sandman for her on his behalf.

=== Miscellaneous ===
The Sandman appears in the BBC radio adaptation of Spider Man, voiced by Michael Roberts.
