= Silver Sable =

Marvel Comics fictional character

- Silver Sable in Silver Sable and the Wild Pack #36 (November 2017). Art by Mahmud Asrar.

Publication information
- Publisher: Marvel Comics
- First appearance: The Amazing Spider-Man #265 (June 1985)
- Created by: Tom DeFalco (writer); Ron Frenz (artist)

In-story information
- Alter ego: Silvija Sablinova
- Species: Human
- Place of origin: Symkaria
- Team affiliations: Wild Pack; Intruders; Outlaws; Heroes for Hire; Sable International
- Notable aliases: Agony
- Abilities: Highly skilled martial artist and hand-to-hand combatant; Expert markswoman, swordswoman, gymnast and strategist; Wears synthetic stretch fabric lined with Kevlar

Silver Sable (Silvija Sablinova) is a character appearing in American comic books published by Marvel Comics. Created by Tom DeFalco and Ron Frenz, Silver Sable first appeared in The Amazing Spider-Man #265 (June 1985). She is usually depicted as a mercenary, hunter of war criminals, leader of the Wild Pack, and owner of Silver Sable International. Her work as a mercenary has sometimes brought her into conflict with several superheroes. Silver Sable is primarily an ally and occasional opponent of Spider-Man.

The character has appeared in several media adaptations over the years, including animated series and video games.

== Publication history ==
Created by Tom DeFalco and Ron Frenz, Silver Sable first appeared in The Amazing Spider-Man #265 (June 1985). The inspiration for the character comes from safari cards bought by DeFalco. After her debut, she made occasional appearances in various Spider-Man titles, often (but not always) as an ally. Marvel Comics began to publish the series Silver Sable and The Wild Pack in June 1992, written by Gregory Wright and penciled by Steven Butler. This series lasted for 35 issues, until it was canceled in 1995.

After the cancellation, Silver made occasional guest appearances in various comics. A limited series titled Sable and Fortune and featuring Silver Sable and Dominic Fortune began in 2006. Originally solicited as a six issue series, Sable and Fortune was later shortened to four issues.

== Fictional character biography ==
The operations of Wild Pack and Silver Sable International drive the national economy of the fictional small European state of Symkaria. The name Wild Pack had been used by the mercenary squad led by Cable for some time, until a legal notice forced them to change it to Six Pack.

The country of Symkaria is adjacent to Latveria, the nation ruled by Doctor Doom. Silver Sable and Victor Von Doom have an annual diplomatic dinner at Castle Doom, situated in Doomstadt. Apparently, the friendship between the two states is deep-rooted and dates back to World War II.

The family of Silver Sable is composed of her father Ernst Sablinov, her uncle Morty, and the young cousin Anna, who Silver Sable calls her niece, orphaned daughter of an unnamed uncle. Silver's mother, Anastasia Sablinova, was killed in front of her by enemies of her father, who ran a Nazi-hunting group. After this traumatic event, she was trained by her father to become a Nazi-hunting mercenary. After her father's death, she became the leader of the Wild Pack, a team formed by Ernst to apprehend international criminals. She also founded her own company, the Silver Sable International. Like her father's, Sable's squad originally focused on bringing Nazi war criminals to justice, but over time they started to accept other type of missions for profit.

Silver was briefly married to the Foreigner, an international assassin and the head of the 1400 Club, but they divorced after she discovered his attempt to kill the President of U.S. After that, their relation varied between non-belligerent and attempts to kill one another.

Uncle Morty functions as Sable's assistant, organizing some missions and sometimes trying to influence her sense of judgement. Silver supports Anna's boarding school education. When Hydra agents took over Anna's school, Sable infiltrated it, rescuing the hostages with the help of Spider-Man, Sandman, and the Wild Pack.

While hunting the international criminal Black Fox to recover valuable gems stolen by the thief, she was inadvertently thwarted by Spider-Man. She was later hired by a South African government to neutralize the international terrorist Jack O'Lantern. She enlisted Spider-Man's aid against the Sinister Syndicate, and forms a first alliance with the Sandman. Some time later, she joined forces with Spider-Man, Paladin, Solo, and Captain America to track down Sabretooth and the Red Skull, who masterminded a plot to put the United States against Symkaria.

She later worked with Spider-Man to steal incriminating documents from a Maggia money launderer; soon after, she formed The Outlaws. An intelligence mission in Iraq resulted in the death of a Wild Pack member, and she denied compensation to the slain man's family due to his negligence. She devised an initiation test for the Prowler to join The Outlaws, while teaching him a lesson in humility in the process. She hired The Outlaws to retrieve a Symkarian nuclear device in England and to rescue the kidnapped daughter of a Canadian official.

Sable's cordial diplomatic relationship with Doctor Doom once proved almost fatal when the annual dinner happened to fall on the time when Doctor Doom's castle had been overtaken by an alien impersonator during the Infinity War crisis. Although Silver noticed that the doppelgänger looked differently, she interpreted it as Doom's desires to change his look. During the dinner, Sable's driver was killed by Doom's robots and a human butler was killed by the doppelgänger himself. Sable protested the brutality and was attacked herself, leading to a chase throughout the castle. The Silver Sable International's soldier came to rescue her, despite Sandman himself also having been replaced by another doppelgänger.

Silver has collaborated with various superheroes, including the aforementioned Spider-Man, the Punisher, Daredevil, Luke Cage, Venom, and Captain America. Sandman was a mercenary working for Silver Sable as part of her Wild Pack for a long time, heading the Intruders, a squad of superpowered mercenaries employed by Silver Sable International.

Later, Sable was hired to protect Professor Wolfgang Hessler holed up in the Symkarian monastery of St. Eboars. Wolfgang knew of a powerful genetic weapon and, attacked by guilt, was working on a neutralizing agent to give to the world so the weapon would be useless. For this mission, Silver Sable hired a new team formed by Shen Kuei, Paladin, and what she thought was Nomad but turned out to be Madcap. The group fought the Heroes for Hire, who had been hired to take the Professor. Sable's team had the upper hand until Deadpool freed his Heroes allies and Luke Cage turned out to be a traitor, sending the Professor off to the Master of the World.

During the "Ends of the Earth" storyline involving one of Doctor Octopus' schemes, Silver Sable recovered Spider-Man and Black Widow after the Avengers are defeated by the Sinister Six. She joined them in an attack on a Sahara facility controlled by Doctor Octopus, with the three defeating Sandman after Spider-Man's allies at Horizon Labs helped determine a way to identify the one particle of sand containing Sandman's consciousness. She was apparently drowned by Rhino in the final battle when Rhino pinned her to the ground in a flooding corridor in Doctor Octopus' base. Even though Doctor Octopus' plan had been stopped, Rhino also decided to kill himself in the process after the loss of his own wife. However, Madame Web later revealed to Spider-Man that Silver Sable was alive.

She has later revealed to be alive, as she requested Spider-Man's help in thwarting a coup of Symkaria organized by Norman Osborn. Sable explained that she had survived her confrontation with the Rhino by using her suit to cloak herself, distracting him long enough for her to escape, using her apparent death to discreetly hunt down most of her enemies.

During the "Venom War" storyline, Silver Sable does a job in Istanbul with Dominic Fortune, who persuaded her to reactivate the Wild Pack. Liz Allan calls in Sable and the Wild Pack to help deal with the Zombiotes. When the Zombiotes confront the Wild Pack, Silver Sable activates the Lethal Protector mode on their armbands, bonding them with their assigned symbiotes. After Wild Pack member Navvab Tadjvar is bitten by a Zombiote, the Agony symbiote leaves him and bonds with Sable.

== Powers and abilities ==
Silver Sable is an athletic woman with no superhuman powers. She is a formidable hand-to-hand combatant, and skilled in various martial arts. She is also an expert markswoman, swordswoman, gymnast and strategist. Silver Sable also possesses strong leadership capabilities.

Silver Sable wears synthetic stretch fabric lined with Kevlar throughout the torso. She often carries a katana, chais (three-pronged half-moon throwing projectiles), a stun gun, and a derringer. Silver Sable generally has the latest technology and equipment at her disposal, provided by Silver Sable International.

When possessed by the Agony symbiote, Silver Sable possesses its powers and abilities.

== Reception ==
Deirdre Kaye of Scary Mommy called Silver Sable a "role model" and "truly heroic." Brenda Hernandez of Screen Rant named Silver Sable one of Spider-Man's "10 Best Female Villains." Peter Eckhardt of Comic Book Resources ranked Silver Sable 6th in their "10 Best Mercenaries In Marvel Comics" list, while Derek Faraci ranked her 5th in their "10 Coolest Bounty Hunters In Comics" list.

== Other versions ==
=== Earth-71490 ===
An alternate universe version of Silver Sable from Earth-71490 named Silver Sabliona appears in "Edge of Spider-Verse" (vol. 5) #2. This version is a fashion designer.

=== Spider-Verse ===
An alternate universe version of Silver Sable, simply called Sable, appears in Spider-Verse as one of Verna's Hounds before she is killed by the Superior Spider-Man.

=== Ultimate Marvel ===
An alternate universe version of Silver Sable from Earth-1610 appears in the Ultimate Marvel imprint.

=== What If? ===
An alternate universe version of Silver Sable appears in What If? (vol. 2) #21. This version entered a relationship with Spider-Man after his wife Black Cat was accidentally killed by the Paladin.

== In other media ==
=== Television ===
- Silver Sable appears in the Spider-Man: The Animated Series five-part episode "Six Forgotten Warriors", voiced by Mira Furlan.
- Silver Sable appears in Spider-Man: The New Animated Series episode "Spider-Man Dis-Sabled", voiced by Virginia Madsen. This version, also known as Silver Sablinovia, is from Russia instead of Symkaria.
- Silver Sable appears in The Spectacular Spider-Man, voiced by Nikki Cox. This version is Sable Manfredi, the daughter of the crime boss Silvermane and ex-girlfriend of Hammerhead.
- Silver Sable appears in Marvel's Spider-Man (2017), voiced by April Stewart.
- Sony cancelled its planned female team-up film Silver & Black (see below) in August 2018 to rework it as two separate solo films focusing on each of the title characters, Silver Sable and Black Cat respectively. Silver & Black's planned director Gina Prince-Bythewood was expected to remain involved as a producer. By January 2020, the project was believed to be in development as a television series, which Prince-Bythewood confirmed in April 2020. She suggested that it could be a limited series and that it had the potential to be released on Disney+.

=== Film ===
In March 2017, it was reported that Sony Pictures was developing a Black Cat and Silver Sable-centered film with writer Christopher Yost. It was intended to be a part of a shared universe called the Sony's Spider-Man Universe, which is centered on characters from the Spider-Man mythology and began with the live-action Venom in 2018. The film was to be more adult-oriented and though it would have taken place in the same reality as the Marvel Cinematic Universe, they would have not crossed over with each other. In May 2017, it was announced that Gina Prince-Bythewood would direct the film, now titled Silver & Black. Production was to begin in March 2018, but the film was later delayed "indefinitely". Prince-Bythewood revealed that the cause of the delay was due to script issues. While the film was initially scheduled to be released on February 8, 2019, Sony removed the release date from the schedule. In August 2018, Sony announced that Silver & Black was canceled in favor of having both characters appear in their own feature films. Black Cat was reportedly a re-worked version of the Silver & Black script while the studio was searching for screenwriters for Silver Sable. Prince-Bythewood will serve as a producer on both projects. As of April 2020, the film is now believed to be cancelled in favor of the proposed live-action television series (see above).

=== Video games ===
- The Ultimate Marvel incarnation of Silver Sable appears in Ultimate Spider-Man, voiced by Jennifer Hale. This version is aware of Peter Parker's identity as Spider-Man.
- The Ultimate Marvel incarnation of Silver Sable appears as a boss in Spider-Man: Battle for New York, voiced again by Jennifer Hale.
- Silver Sable appears as a playable character in the Microsoft Windows, Xbox 360, and Wii versions of Spider-Man: Friend or Foe, voiced again by Jennifer Hale.
- Silver Sable appears as a playable character in The Punisher: No Mercy.
- Silver Sable appears in Spider-Man: Shattered Dimensions, voiced again by Jennifer Hale.
- Silver Sable appears as a gear vendor in the S.H.I.E.L.D. Helicarrier in Marvel Heroes.
- Silver Sable appears as a boss and playable character in Spider-Man Unlimited, voiced by Mary Elizabeth McGlynn.
- Silver Sable appears as a playable character in Marvel Avengers Academy, voiced by Morgan Berry.
- Silver Sable appears in Marvel's Spider-Man (2018), voiced by Nichole Elise. This version is the leader of a private military firm called Sable International. Additionally, she appears as the first boss of the "Silver Lining" DLC.
- Silver Sable appears as a playable character in Marvel Contest of Champions.
