= Calypso (comics) =

Marvel Comics fictional character

- Textless variant cover of The Amazing Spider-Man #20 (April 2019). Art by Lucio Parrillo.

Publication information
- Publisher: Marvel Comics
- First appearance: The Amazing Spider-Man #209 (October 1980)
- Created by: Denny O'Neil; Alan Weiss

In-story information
- Alter ego: Calypso Ezili
- Species: Human
- Partnerships: Kraven the Hunter
- Notable aliases: The Hunter of Souls; The Witch
- Abilities: Use of potions with different effects; Resurrection; Mind control

Calypso Ezili is a supervillain appearing in American comic books published by Marvel Comics. Created by writer Denny O'Neil and artist Alan Weiss, the character first appeared in Amazing Spider-Man #209 (October 1980). Calypso is a voodoo priestess of Haitian descent. She serves as an adversary of the superhero Peter Parker / Spider-Man. The character is the occasional lover and partner of Kraven the Hunter. Calypso is also known as The Witch and The Hunter of Souls.

Since her original introduction in comics, the character has been featured in various other Marvel-licensed products, including animated television series and video games. The character made her live-action debut in the Sony's Spider-Man Universe (SSU) film Kraven the Hunter, portrayed by Ariana DeBose.

== Publication history ==
Calypso debuted in The Amazing Spider-Man #209 (October 1980), created by Denny O'Neil and Alan Weiss. She initially appeared as a minor character in The Amazing Spider-Man #209 and Peter Parker, The Spectacular Spider-Man #65, where she was an ally of Spider-Man's enemy Kraven the Hunter. After Kraven's death, Calypso bewitched the Lizard into helping her attack Spider-Man in Spider-Man Vol. 1, #1–5, then made guest appearances in Daredevil Vol. 1, #310–311 and Daredevil Annual Vol. 1, #9. Calypso next appeared in Web of Spider-Man Vol. 1, #109–110 and Spider-Man Annual 1997, and was killed off in a storyline that spanned The Spectacular Spider-Man #249–253.

== Fictional character biography ==
Calypso is a nameless voodoo priestess who was born and raised in Haiti. She was a psychopathic woman who was associated with Kraven the Hunter. She seemed to enjoy driving Kraven into fits of rage and furthering his hatred of Spider-Man, which ultimately led to his suicide in the "Kraven's Last Hunt" storyline.

When artist Todd McFarlane started writing the new Spider-Man comic in 1990, his opening five-issue story arc "Torment" featured Calypso as the main antagonist, whom McFarlane transformed into a dangerous threat for Spider-Man. The explanation for her supernatural powers was the sacrifice of her younger sister. She used her abilities to hold Lizard in her grasp and the two nearly succeeded in murdering Spider-Man. Ultimately, the webslinger defeats them both and Calypso is apparently killed.

Calypso as she appears in art by Todd McFarlane

She resurfaces abducting Haitian refugees, turning some into zombie slaves and selling the rest back to her homeland's government. Her actions bring her into conflict with Daredevil and his Infinity War doppelganger Hellspawn. Calypso briefly enthralls Daredevil, but he breaks free of her control and she seemingly dies yet again when the spirits of those she turned into zombies overwhelm her. Cheating death once more, she flees to New Orleans where her obsession with necromancy leads her to the resting place of Simon Garth, a self-aware zombie. Reviving Garth, Calypso tests his abilities and pits him against Hellspawn though he eventually breaks free of her control and wanders off, leaving one of his Amulets of Damballah with Calypso.

Calypso subsequently breaks into the Vault and attempts to make the incarcerated Lizard her servant again, but he resists and mauls her. However, she transfers her spirit into the Amulet of Damballah and later possesses Glory Grant. Despite interference from Spider-Man, Garth, and Shotgun, she exhumes her own corpse and revives herself using the Amulet.

Commanding a squad of savages, Calypso later attacks Spider-Man and Alyosha Kravinoff, the son of the original Kraven the Hunter. Desiring revenge for losing Sergei, she uses her powers to drive Spider-Man and Alyosha into fighting each other. Spider-Man and Alyosha fight off her spell and share a handshake. Alyosha says that he will hold Calypso at his mansion so she can tell him about his long-lost father. In actuality, Alyosha kills Calypso.

== Powers and abilities ==
Calypso gained supernatural abilities by sacrificing her sister in a ritual. She is a trained practitioner of voodoo, being skilled with voodoo drums, potions, and charms. She created a magical potion that enhanced Kraven the Hunter's abilities and made him the best hunter in the world. He was notably granted superhuman strength, speed, and heightened senses. Calypso also possesses the power of mind control and resurrection. She used her powers to take control of the Lizard and increase his aggression.

== Other versions ==
An alternate version of Calypso appears in the What If Spider-Man Killed the Lizard? storyline. After Spider-Man is forced to kill the Lizard during an alternate retelling of the "Torment" story-arc, Calypso approaches the Lizard's grieving son, Billy Connors. She offers him a potion that will make him "just like daddy," giving him the opportunity to seek revenge on Spider-Man.

== In other media ==
=== Television ===
- Calypso appears in Spider-Man: The Animated Series, voiced by Susan Beaubian. This version is Dr. Mariah Crawford, a research scientist who was engaged to Sergei Kravinoff before a serum made by a colleague transformed him into Kraven the Hunter. Throughout the series, she assists Spider-Man and Kraven in their adventures, such as creating a cure for the former's Man-Spider mutation, until she contracts an African plague she was helping to fight. To save her, Kraven injects her with the same serum that she used on him, which eventually mutates her into a feral feline monster. Kraven joins forces with Spider-Man and Black Cat to cure Crawford before the two leave to live in Africa.
- Calypso appears in The Spectacular Spider-Man episode "Destructive Testing", voiced by Angela Bryant. This version is Kraven's partner.

=== Film ===
Calypso Ezili appears in Kraven the Hunter, portrayed by Ariana DeBose as an adult and Diaana Babnicova as a child. This version received a potion from her grandmother that she would later use to save Sergei Kravinoff's life and grant him the abilities of nature's greatest predators. Sixteen years later, she has become a successful lawyer and a master archer before reuniting with Sergei and assisting him in hunting criminals.

=== Video games ===
- Calypso appears as a secret boss in Spider-Man 2, voiced by Angela V. Shelton.
- Calypso appears in Spider-Man 3, voiced again by Angela V. Shelton.
- A Marvel Noir-inspired incarnation of Calypso appears as a boss in the Nintendo DS version of Spider-Man: Shattered Dimensions, voiced by Jennifer Hale.
