= Kraven the Hunter =

Fictional character appearing in Marvel Comics

Sergei Nikolaevich Kravinoff Kraven the Hunter
- Kraven the Hunter. Textless cover to Venom #157 (November 2017). Art by Mark Bagley, John Dell, and John Rauch.

Publication information
- Publisher: Marvel Comics
- First appearance: The Amazing Spider-Man #15 (August 1964)
- Created by: Stan Lee (writer); Steve Ditko (artist)

In-story information
- Full name: Sergei Nikolaevich Kravinoff
- Species: Human mutate
- Team affiliations: Sinister Six; Kravinoff Family; Avengers 1959; Army of Evil; Justice Pals
- Partnerships: Calypso Ezili; Squirrel Girl
- Notable aliases: Kraven the Hunter; Unhuntable Sergei; Scarlet Spider; Spider-Man; The Hunter; Giorgi Tchubabria
- Abilities: Superhuman strength, stamina, durability, speed, agility, reflexes, longevity, and senses; Experienced armed and unarmed combatant; Master tactician, strategist, occultist, and hunter; Use of various weapons, equipment, and drugs

Kraven the Hunter (Sergei Nikolaevich Kravinoff; Russian: Сергей Николаевич Кравинов) is a supervillain appearing in American comic books published by Marvel Comics. Created by writer Stan Lee and artist Steve Ditko, the character first appeared in The Amazing Spider-Man #15 (August 1964) as an adversary for the superhero Spider-Man. He has since endured as one of Spider-Man's most formidable foes, and is part of the collective of adversaries that make up Spider-Man's rogues' gallery. Kraven has also come into conflict with other heroes, such as Black Panther and Tigra. He is the half-brother of the Chameleon and a founding member of the Sinister Six.

In Kraven's first appearance, he calls Spider-Man "the most dangerous game", a direct reference to the 1924 short story of the same name, in which General Zaroff, a Russian big-game hunter (and a primary inspiration for the character), hunts people for sport.

Kraven is typically portrayed as a renowned big-game hunter whose goal in life is to beat Spider-Man to prove himself as the world's greatest hunter. Though he is often overconfident in his own abilities, about which he likes to boast, he possesses a great sense of honor, and treats his adversaries as equals until proven otherwise. Because of this, Kraven has sometimes been depicted as an antihero and has teamed up with other heroes, including Spider-Man, the Avengers of 1959, and Squirrel Girl, in The Unbeatable Squirrel Girl (2015–2019). The character is widely regarded as one of Spider-Man's most formidable enemies, and has gained considerable attention from storylines such as 1987's "Kraven's Last Hunt," 2010's "Grim Hunt" and 2019's "Hunted". The mantle of Kraven the Hunter has also been assumed by Kraven's sons Alyosha and Sergei Kravinoff II, and his daughter Ana Kravinoff.

Since his original introduction in comics, the character has been featured in various other Marvel-licensed products, including video games, animated television series, and merchandise. Aaron Taylor-Johnson portrayed Kraven the Hunter in the Sony's Spider-Man Universe (SSU) live-action film Kraven the Hunter (2024).

== Publication history ==
Kraven the Hunter on the cover of The Amazing Spider-Man #47 (April 1967). Art by John Romita Sr.

The character first appeared in The Amazing Spider-Man issue #15 (August 1964), and was created by writer Stan Lee and artist Steve Ditko. Though he would occasionally appear in other characters' titles, he was most frequently used as a Spider-Man foe. He is killed off in the acclaimed 1987 storyline by J. M. DeMatteis, Mike Zeck, and Bob McLeod, "Kraven's Last Hunt". Although generally considered to be the definitive Kraven the Hunter story, the story originally had a completely different character in Kraven's role. Writer DeMatteis recounted:

As I was getting ready to work on the story, I was sitting in my office and looking through a Marvel Universe Handbook and came across the entry for Kraven the Hunter. To this day, I don't know if this was something that was established in continuity, or if whoever was writing the Handbook entry made it up, but they mentioned that Kraven was Russian. For me, a total Dostoyevsky fanatic, the idea that Kraven was Russian and had the same tortured, Russian soul that the great Dostoyevsky characters had, unlocked this door in my head and suddenly I had a new understanding of this character. I thought about Kraven and the forces that had driven him to be who and what he was. This was a character I had never had any interest in whatsoever. I always thought he was one of the stupidest Spider-Man villains ever, but suddenly I had this whole new take on the character.

Despite Kraven the Hunter being one of Spider-Man's most long-standing arch-enemies, DeMatteis claims that none of Marvel's editorial staff objected to the proposal to have him killed in the story. Kraven later returns as a ghost in the graphic novel The Amazing Spider-Man: Soul of the Hunter, also by DeMatteis, Zeck, and McLeod. DeMatteis also wrote "Kraven's First Hunt" for The Sensational Spider-Man Annual '96, a retelling of The Amazing Spider-Man #15 which incorporated several DeMatteis retcons, such as that Kraven was abusive towards the Chameleon.

== Fictional character biography ==
Sergei Kravinoff (Сергей Кравинов) is a Russian immigrant, the son of the aristocrat Nikolai Kravinoff who fled to the United States with his family in 1917 after the executions of Russian nobility by the February Revolution and subsequent collapse of the reign of Tsar Nicholas II.

Kraven is a maniacal big-game hunter who seeks to defeat Spider-Man to prove that he is the greatest hunter in the world. Unlike other hunters, he typically disdains the use of guns or bow and arrows, preferring to take down large dangerous animals with his bare hands. He also lives by a code of honour of sorts, choosing to hunt his game fairly. He consumes a mystical serum to give himself enhanced strength and dramatically slow the aging process. Kraven was trained as a hunter largely by a mysterious man named Gregor, a mercenary who once battled Ka-Zar. Kraven was, at one point, the lover of the voodoo priestess Calypso.

He is contacted by his half-brother the Chameleon to defeat Spider-Man. He leads Spider-Man to Central Park with the help of the Chameleon, who disguises himself as Kraven to use himself as a decoy while the real Kraven ambushes the hero. However, despite Kraven having weakened Spider-Man with a poisonous dart, Spider-Man prevails in the end. Spider-Man proves a frustrating quarry because Kraven continually underestimates the superhero's resourcefulness.

Kraven becomes a founding member of the Sinister Six when he accepts Doctor Octopus's offer to form a team to fight Spider-Man. They capture Aunt May and Betty Brant. He attacks Spider-Man in Central Park with three tigers. Spider-Man fights off the attackers and secures the next clue to where Aunt May and Betty Brant are being held. After Aunt May and Betty Brant are rescued, Kraven the Hunter and the rest of the Sinister Six are arrested by the police.

While in the Savage Land, Kraven the Hunter finds Gog in a spaceship that he stumbles upon. Realizing how useful Gog can be, Kraven decides to use him in a plot to conquer the Savage Land. After kidnapping the visiting Gwen Stacy from a camp in the Savage Land, Kraven and Gog battle the heroes Ka-Zar and Spider-Man. While Ka-Zar deals with Kraven, Spider-Man defeats Gog by luring him into a patch of quicksand, which he sinks to the bottom of.

=== Kraven's Last Hunt ===
Determined to end his life as he becomes older, frustrated with his failing health and continuing failure to defeat Spider-Man, Kraven sets out a final hunt for Spider-Man. After capturing Spider-Man, he shoots him with a coma-inducing drug and buries him alive on his estate. To complete his victory, he attempts to become Spider-Man's clear superior by impersonating him in a brutal vigilante campaign and capturing Vermin, the one foe Spider-Man had never been able to defeat on his own (Spider-Man's last battle with Vermin required Captain America's assistance).

After Spider-Man emerges from his grave two weeks later, Kraven explains his actions to him and sets Vermin free. Spider-Man goes after Vermin to prevent his killing again. Kraven leaves a final confession of his crimes against Spider-Man and then commits suicide. Because of his suicide, his soul is unable to find rest until Spider-Man confronts his risen corpse on Kraven's behalf.

=== The Gauntlet and Grim Hunt ===
Across "The Gauntlet" and "Grim Hunt", Kraven is resurrected by his ex-wife Sasha Kravinoff and their children with a dark magic ritual using the blood of Spider-Man. Thoroughly unhappy and enraged with having been bestowed an unwanted revival, Sergei is shown to now be explosively psychopathic and cold towards his family, beating his son Vladimir and daughter Ana and expressing little attention towards his wife. After being stabbed by his daughter Ana, Sergei recovers, stating that Sasha restored him with corrupted blood which he calls "unlife". They pull off the mask of the corpse of Spider-Man hung in their mantel and discover that Kaine had impersonated Peter in Spider-Man's costume. Kaine's nature as a clone indicates his unnatural existence has muddied the properties of the ritual. Spider-Man, in his black costume, confronts Kraven and the rest of the Kravinoff family. Spider-Man is tempted to kill Kraven, who eagerly and desperately attempts to goad him into it. Beating him brutally, Spider-Man takes Kraven's spear in hand and prepares to grant his enemy his wish but he refuses to do so when he is reminded by Julia Carpenter (who has inherited the powers of Madame Web after her death) that committing murder is not in his moral code, and furthermore, by going through with it, damns himself to a future where from that point he takes on a more brutal approach to crime-fighting, including killing suspects, which will lead him to die in a standoff against the police (a scenario previously glimpsed in an earlier issue). Following their defeat by Spider-Man, Kraven and his family escape to the Savage Land. While there, Kraven kills Sasha and Vladimir. Alyosha flees in disgust of what his dad did to his stepmom and half-brother afterwards. Kraven and Ana discuss rebuilding the Kravinoff family, which leads to Ana running off to hunt Alyosha to prove herself worthy.

It was later revealed that in the 1950s, Kraven was a member of Nick Fury's Avengers alongside Dominic Fortune, Dum Dum Dugan, Namora, Silver Sable, Sabretooth, and Ulysses Bloodstone, tracking a stolen version of the Super-Soldier Serum combined with the Infinity Formula that had been stolen by a group of Nazis attempting to create their own Captain America.

=== The Unbeatable Squirrel Girl ===
Kraven, still claiming to be cursed, next battles Squirrel Girl at Empire State University, having earned her ire by lashing out at the local squirrels, including Tippy-Toe. Kraven departs when Squirrel Girl informs him of the existence of sea monsters like Giganto, playing on Kraven's obsessions by challenging him to hunt worthier prey. Squirrel Girl has helped Kraven reform, teaming up with him to fight other villains, even establishing a friendship with him. She helps Kraven realize that Spider-Man is not even close to being the most dangerous prey in the Marvel Universe.

=== Hunted ===
In the "Hunted" storyline, Kraven the Hunter has 87 clones of him created, trained as the Sons of Kraven, and sent out to prove themselves by being hunted by each other. The surviving clone is labeled as the Last Son of Kraven. With help from Taskmaster, Black Ant, and Arcade, Kraven captures various animal-themed villains, traps them in Central Park, and has a group of Hunter-Bots hunt them down for sport. It is revealed that Kraven's secret motive is to force Spider-Man into killing him again so that he can be free from his curse of immortality. Kraven releases all the surviving hunting targets and dons a copy of Spider-Man's black costume. Mistaking Kraven for Spider-Man, the Last Son of Kraven kills him, freeing him of his curse.

== Powers and abilities ==
By regularly ingesting the potion made from various unnamed jungle herbs, Kraven grants himself superhuman physical abilities, making him a physical threat to Spider-Man, although these powers are not as developed as those possessed by Spider-Man. Kraven's body is also more durable, and more resistant to certain forms of injury than the body of a normal human. He can withstand great impact forces, such as falling from several stories or being repeatedly struck by a superhumanly strong opponent, that would severely injure or kill a normal human, with little to no injury to himself. The effects of the potion have dramatically altered Kraven's aging process to the point that he has aged little, if at all, over several decades. Despite being over 70 years of age, he has the physical appearance of a man in his 30's.

The potion enhances Kraven's sight, hearing, and smell to superhuman levels, adding to his already impressive tracking skills. He can see farther, and with much greater clarity, than a normal human. His hearing is similarly enhanced, enabling him to detect sounds which an ordinary human cannot, or sounds that a normal human could detect, but at much greater distances. Kraven can use his sense of smell to track a target by scent, much as some animals do, even if the scent has been somewhat eroded by natural factors.

Even without his superhuman powers, Kraven is an athlete, tactician, hunter, and hand-to-hand combatant. He also has great knowledge of pressure points, both in the anatomy of humans and in many animals. He can strike at these nerve clusters with pinpoint accuracy, allowing him to incapacitate more powerful opponents or animals. He is familiar with many exotic poisons and tranquilizers, which he often uses during his hunts.

Due to a flaw in the ceremony that resurrected him, Kraven was given "the unlife... the eternal curse", as he discovered when his daughter stabbed him through the heart. According to Kraven, he can now only die by Spider-Man's hand. However, this curse was apparently broken when Kaine temporarily killed Kraven by stopping his heart and then restarting it with the same move.

== Family ==
Kravinoff family

Sonya Smerdyakova	Nikolai Kravinoff	Anna Makarova Kravinova	Aleksandra Nikolaevna
Dmitri Anatoly Nikolayevich Smerdyakov; The Chameleon	Calypso Ezili; The Witch of Kraven	Sergei Nikolaevich Kravinoff (né Kravinov); Kraven the Hunter; The Unhuntable Sergei	Aleksandra "Sasha" Kravinova (née Nikolaevna)
Xraven; The Hunter X (Note: Clone of Kraven created by Mister Sinister, featuring the DNA of the X-Men Cyclops, Marvel Girl, Iceman, Angel, and Beast, as well as a sample of the Carnage symbiote.)	Nedrocci "Ned" Tannengarden	Anastasia "Ana" Tatiana Kravinova; Kraven the Hunter	Vladimir "Vlad" Kravinoff; The Grim Hunter; Son of the Hunter
Alexei Sergeevich "Alyosha" Kravinoff; Kraven the Hunter	The Sons of Kraven (Note: "Hunted" established 87 such clones of Kraven the Hunter to exist, until all are killed by one of their number, dubbed "The Last Son of Kraven" and heir to his father's identity.)	Sergei Kravinoff II; The Last Son of Kraven

Mikhail Aleksei Nikolaevich
Unnamed Sisters

=== Chameleon ===
Chameleon is Kraven the Hunter's half-brother.

=== Grim Hunter ===
Vladimir Kravinoff is the son of Sergei Kravinoff, the infamous adversary of Spider-Man known as Kraven the Hunter. Unlike his illegitimate half-brother Alyosha Kravinoff who was raised in shame in Africa, Vladimir grew up in Russia benefiting from his father's wealth and luxuries. Their father often neglected both sons while he pursued his various international quarries. Unaware of his siblings, Vladimir was raised by Sergei's servant Gregor. Vladimir Kravinoff took up the name "Grim Hunter" and decided to hunt down Spider-Man and several of his foes. He only had one battle with Spider-Man, and his methods were nearly the same as his father's. After getting out of jail, Vladimir attempts to track down Spider-Man, but is killed by Kaine Parker.

During "The Gauntlet and Grim Hunt" storyline, Sasha Kravinoff sacrifices Mattie Franklin as part of a revival ritual that resurrects Vladimir as a lion-like creature. Vladimir assists Ana Kravinoff and Alyosha Kravinoff with capturing Anya Corazon as well as a second attempt to capture Arachne. After Spider-Man defeats the Kravinoff family, they escape to the Savage Land, where Sergei kills Sasha and Vladimir.

=== Alyosha Kravinoff ===
Alyosha Kravinoff is a mutant who is the second Kraven the Hunter through an unnamed female mutant some time after the death of Vladimir.

Unlike Vladimir, Alyosha was separated from his family and raised in an African jungle. After Kraven's suicide, Alyosha comes to New York City to investigate his father. However, Calypso poisons Alyosha and Spider-Man and uses her hypnotic powers to force the two to fight to the death. Spider-Man resists and injured Calypso, while Alyosha subdued her with his lion. Despite asking for her forgiveness, Alyosha kills Calypso and all the tribesmen with her.

Alyosha begins dating Timber Hughes, an aspiring actress who worked as a waitress at an all-villain bar. Alyosha sought to help Timber's career in Hollywood by becoming a director. Despite celebrity connections, Alyosha's efforts were stonewalled by arrogance, greed, and corruption within the Hollywood elite. Forced out of Hollywood by the powerful Rothstein brothers, Alyosha is beaten while Timber is raped. Alyosha and Timber leave Hollywood to pursue heroics in New York City.

During "The Gauntlet" storyline, Alyosha returned to New York to help his half-sister Ana and stepmother Sasha in the Grim Hunt by hunting Kaine. They then witness Spider-Man's fight with the Lizard. He was present at the ritual where Sasha sacrificed Mattie Franklin as part of a revival ritual that resurrects his half-brother Vladimir as a humanoid lion-like creature. After Spider-Man defeats the Kravinoff family, they escape to the Savage Land, where Alyosha is killed by Ana.

=== Nedrocci Tannengarden ===
There was a third son named Nedrocci "Ned" Tannengarden who tried to kill Alyosha, but he was murdered by the Chameleon (who, during that time, believed himself to be the original Kraven the Hunter).

=== Xraven ===
Mister Sinister made a deal with Cletus Kasady to obtain a sample of the Carnage symbiote. After removing the sentience from the Carnage symbiote sample, Sinister combined it with the DNA of the original X-Men (Cyclops, Marvel Girl, Iceman, Angel, and Beast) and that of Kraven the Hunter, creating Xraven. Xraven has all of the powers of the original X-Men as well as retractable claws.

=== Ana Kravinoff ===
The daughter of Kraven the Hunter, Ana Kravinoff becomes the first female to take on the name of Kraven the Hunter. She first appears tracking Spider-Man to his apartment, but mistakenly believes Peter Parker's roommate Vin Gonzales was him. She then methodically ruins Vin's life, and captures him. Despite Vin's claims that he was not Spider-Man, Kraven prepared to hunt him, but was stopped by the real Spider-Man. At the end, it is revealed that she is the daughter of Kraven and Sasha Aleksandra Nikolaevich.

Ana assists her half-brother Alyosha Kravinoff into attempting to abduct Arachne, only to run afoul of Spider-Man, who repels them. Ana alongside Alyosha, Electro, and Diablo are present when Sasha sacrifices Mattie Franklin as part of a ritual that resurrects Vladimir Kravinoff as a lion-like creature. Ana alongside Vladimir and Alyosha attacks Anya Corazon, only to end up fighting Spider-Man, Arachne, Kaine, and Chameleon. The Kravinoffs manage to overpower them and make off with Anya and Arachne. After Chameleon sheds his disguise and Spider-Man partially succumbs to the drugs the Kravinoffs have given him, Ana is present when Kaine (dressed as Spider-Man) is killed as a sacrifice as part of a ritual that revives her father Sergei Kravinoff. Following the resurrection, Sergei gets acquainted with his family. When Kraven returns after preventing Vladimir from attacking the captives, he is shown to lack a sense of control, attacking Ana until he is stabbed in the heart by Ana in self-defense. Sergei recovers, stating that Sasha restored him with corrupted blood or the "unlife" as he puts it. When the Kravinoff family is defeated, Ana alongside the other Kravinoffs escapes to the Savage Land. After Sasha and Vladimir are killed by Kraven and Alyosha flees, she runs off to hunt Alyosha to prove herself to Kraven. She tells Kraven that if she can take down Alyosha, Kraven should train her and help rebuild the Kravinoff family.

With the help of Ana, Kraven kidnaps Kaine's friends to motivate the Scarlet Spider to fight him. In the end, Kaine delivers a fatal blow to Kraven, which paralyzes his heart. But using the same attack, Kaine brings him back to life, supposedly breaking the curse. Following the fight, both Kravens disappear.

Ana reveals that she has Inhuman ancestry on her mother's side, something she discovered while hunting down her mother's family members (and for which her father tried to kill her when she told him). Ana comes to Utolan looking for a cure, but is sedated by order of the councilwoman Sanara. Ana manages to escape and hunts down Sanara. She is exposed to Terrigen Mist during her hunt, activating her Inhuman abilities.

=== Sasha Kravinoff ===
Kraven's wife and Ana and Vladimir's mother Sasha Kravinoff was part of a Gauntlet on Spider-Man's life, causing chaos and weakening Spider-Man prior to the events that led to resurrecting Kraven from the grave.

=== Last Son of Kraven ===
The Last Son of Kraven (one of the many Sons of Kraven) was cloned from Kraven's DNA by the High Evolutionary. He hunted his fellow clones and returned to Kraven, where he proved himself by presenting him with the skulls of his fellow clones. The Last Son of Kraven is manipulated into killing Kraven, who has disguised himself as Spider-Man. After attending his funeral of his "father", the Last Son of Kraven finds a letter written to him by his "father" behind Kraven's rifle on the wall. This led to the Last Son of Kraven taking on the aliases of both Sergei Kravinoff and Kraven. He cuts his hair, wipes off his tiger stripes, and dons a copy of Kraven's costume.

== Reception ==
IGN ranked Kraven the Hunter 53rd in their "Top Comic Book Villains" list. David Harth of Comic Book Resources described Kraven the Hunter as a "cool villain", praising the design of the character, and described him as "more than a match for Spider-Man."

== Other versions ==
Many alternate universe versions of Kraven the Hunter have appeared throughout the character's publication history.

=== Amazing Spider-Man: Renew Your Vows ===
In The Amazing Spider-Man: Renew Your Vows, Kraven appears as a member of Regent's Sinister Six.

=== Earth-31 ===
An alternate universe version of Sergei Kravinoff from Earth-31 called Hunter Spider, who acquired spider-like abilities after being bitten by a giant spider, appears in End of the Spider-Verse.

=== Marvel Noir ===
In Marvel Noir, Kraven is a former animal trainer who is later killed by man-eating spiders.

=== Infinity Wars ===
Bushman the Hunter, a composite character based on Kraven and Bushman, appears in Infinity Wars.

=== Spider-Man: Life Story ===
In Spider-Man: Life Story, Venom bonded with Kraven before he could kill himself, eventually reducing Kraven to a skeleton.

=== Ultimate Marvel ===
In the Ultimate Marvel universe, Sergei Kravinoff is a Russian Australian and the host of a reality series where he hunts down dangerous animals. Kraven intends to hunt and kill Spider-Man on live television to boost his ratings. He was easily beaten by Spider-Man following his victory over Doctor Octopus and his show was cancelled. Kraven receives enhancements that give him an animalistic appearance in the "Ultimate Six" storyline, but later appears with his enhancements removed by "The Death of Spider-Man" storyline.

=== Ultimate Universe ===
In the Ultimate Universe imprint, Kraven is a billionaire oligarch whose family was exiled from Russia during the "Rasputin Purge". Additionally, he is a lieutenant of Wilson Fisk who controls Staten Island on his behalf and later joins his Sinister Six to combat the Green Goblin and Spider-Man.

=== Spider-Man '94 ===
In Earth-92131, continuing the story of Spider-Man: The Animated Series, the show's version of Kraven appears, being on the hunt for Morlun, after this one tried to kill him. It s revealed that Kraven is slowly dying from the same serum that was used by Dr. Mariah Crawford aka. Calypso to save his life once (with her having already died from it), and that he has embarked on a journey that he has called his "Last Hunt", where he wishes to kill Morlun.

== In other media ==
=== Television ===
- Kraven the Hunter appears in The Marvel Super Heroes "Iron Man" segment episode "Cliffs of Doom", voiced by Chris Wiggins.
- Kraven the Hunter appears in the Spider-Man (1981) episode "The Hunter and the Hunted", voiced by Jack DeLeon.
- Kraven the Hunter appears in the Spider-Man and His Amazing Friends episode "The Crime of All Centuries", voiced by Robert Ridgely.
- Kraven the Hunter appears in Spider-Man: The Animated Series, voiced by Gregg Berger. This version is not portrayed as a villain; only coming into conflict with Spider-Man after the former was driven insane. Additionally, Kraven was originally a big-game hunter who got wounded while saving his fiancée Mariah Crawford. To save his life, Crawford administered a serum that healed him and strengthened his senses and physical abilities, though it also caused him to become increasingly bestial and paranoid until Spider-Man assists in curing him.
- A Counter-Earth incarnation of Kraven the Hunter simply called the Hunter appears in the Spider-Man Unlimited episode "Enter the Hunter!", voiced by Paul Dobson. This version is an African-American mercenary who works for the High Evolutionary and the rebels opposing him depending on who can pay his fee. Additionally, he is one of few humans that live in the upper sections of the High Evolutionary's city and utilizes a toxic serum that gives him the traits of certain animals when mixed with their pheromones, but shortens his lifespan.
- Kraven the Hunter appears in the Spider-Man: The New Animated Series episode "Mind Games", voiced by Michael Dorn. This version previously fought Spider-Man prior to the series and poisoned the Gaines twins' parents, which led to the twins acquiring hypnotic powers.
- Kraven the Hunter appears in The Spectacular Spider-Man, voiced by Eric Vesbit. This version was originally a renowned hunter who could take down large animals with only his natural abilities. He later enlists Miles Warren to transform him into a humanoid black-maned leonine creature with leopard and cheetah-like traits and joins the Sinister Six.
- Kraven the Hunter appears in Ultimate Spider-Man, voiced by Diedrich Bader. This version is a member of the Sinister Six who wields high-tech versions of traditional hunting weapons and mystical artifacts he collected from his journeys. Additionally, he killed Hector Ayala / White Tiger and gained an arch-enemy in the latter's daughter and successor Ava Ayala.
- An amalgamated incarnation of Kraven the Hunter appears in Spider-Man (2017), voiced by Troy Baker. Similarly to his Ultimate Marvel counterpart, this version is the host of a TV show called Kraven's Amazing Hunt who possesses Alyosha Kravinoff's long hair and eye paint, a cataract in one eye, and a cybernetic right arm.
- Kraven the Hunter appears in the Avengers Assemble episode "T'Challa Royale", voiced again by Troy Baker. This version has the same appearance as the one in Spider-Man (2017), but lacks a cataract and sports a beard.

=== Film ===
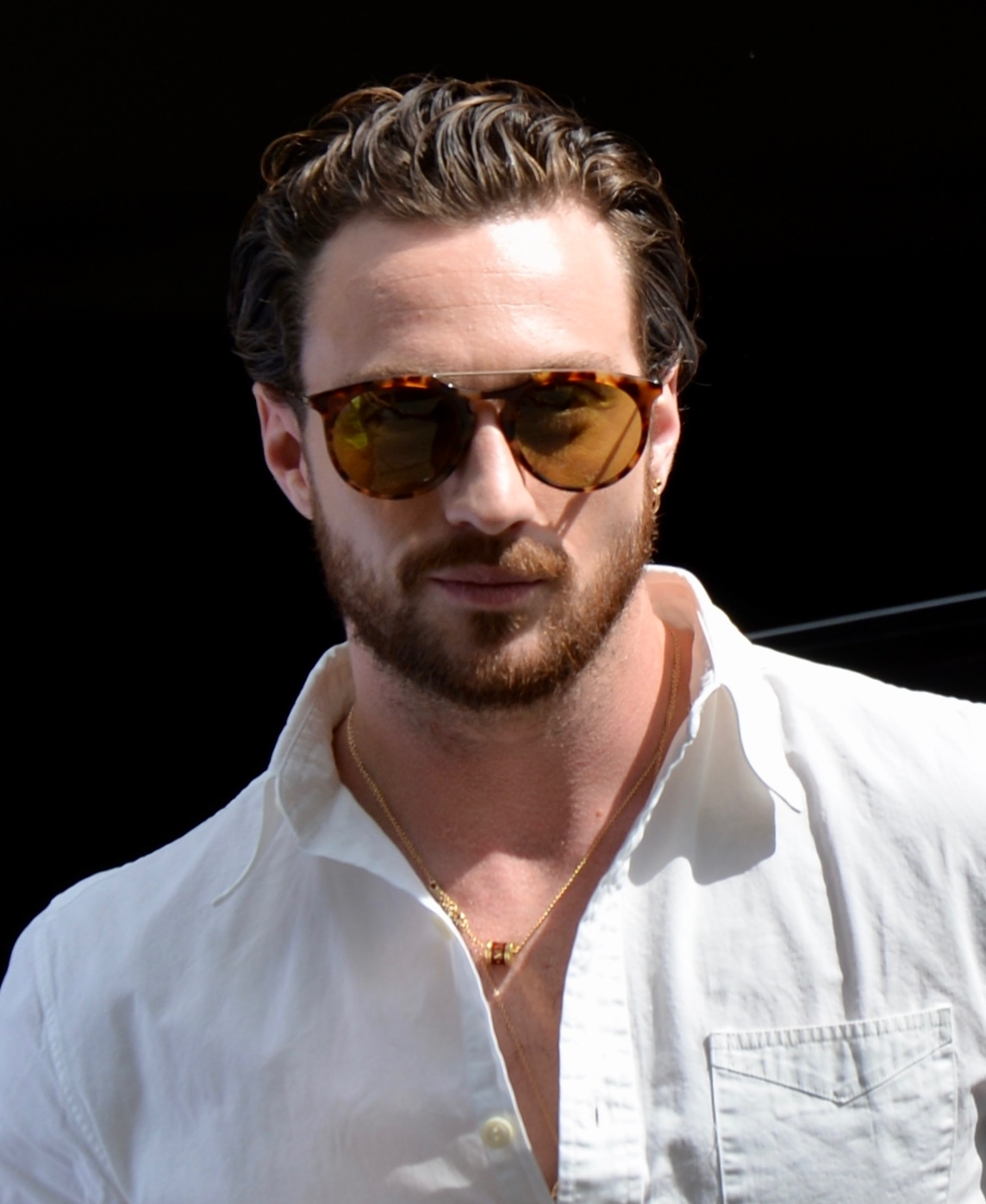
Aaron Taylor-Johnson portrayed Kraven the Hunter in the 2024 film adaptation of the character

- Kraven the Hunter appears in a self-titled film, portrayed by Aaron Taylor-Johnson as an adult and Levi Miller as a young adult. This version was attacked by a lion before he was saved by Calypso, who gave him a potion that granted him the abilities of nature's greatest predators. Ever since, Kraven uses his newfound powers to hunt criminals.
- Two alternate universe-displaced versions of Kraven the Hunter make cameo appearances in Spider-Man: Across the Spider-Verse as prisoners of the Spider-Society.
- Kraven the Hunter was teased during the end credits of The Amazing Spider-Man 2 as part of Sony's setup for the Sinister Six.
- The silhouette of Kraven the Hunter appears in the multiversal sky during the climax of Spider-Man: No Way Home.
- A popular internet meme and fan theory claims that Mr. Ditkovich from Sam Raimi’s Spider-Man trilogy was a retired Kraven the Hunter.

=== Video games ===
- Kraven the Hunter appears as a boss in Spider-Man 2: The Sinister Six. This version is a member of the eponymous team.
- Kraven the Hunter appears as a boss in the Xbox port of Spider-Man (2002), voiced by Peter Lurie.
- Kraven the Hunter appears as a boss in Spider-Man 3, voiced by Neil Kaplan.
  - In the Treyarch version, he is partnered with Calypso, who provides him with various magic spells that give him the powers of a bear, a crow, and a black panther. After Calypso transforms the Lizard into a giant monster, she and Kraven leave Spider-Man to fight the Lizard himself.
  - In the Vicarious Visions version, Kraven leads a group of hunters and only uses one potion that grants him super-speed. He is defeated by Spider-Man shortly before the Lizard mutates himself into a giant monster.
- Kraven the Hunter appears as a boss in the PS2 and PSP versions of Spider-Man: Web of Shadows, voiced by Dwight Schultz.
- Kraven the Hunter appears as a boss in Spider-Man: Shattered Dimensions, voiced by Jim Cummings. Kraven kidnaps Spider-Man, brings him to a jungle temple to hunt him on the former's terms with help from his students, and forces him to cooperate by revealing that he has a fragment of the Tablet of Order and Chaos. After Spider-Man evades his traps, humiliates him in front of his students, and defeats him in a cage match, Kraven uses the fragment to enhance himself, gaining superhuman speed and strength. However, he is defeated by Spider-Man, who claims his tablet fragment.
- Kraven the Hunter serves as inspiration for one of Mike Haggar's costumes in Ultimate Marvel vs. Capcom 3.
- Kraven the Hunter appears in Marvel Avengers Alliance as a member of the Sinister Six.
- Kraven the Hunter appears as a playable character in Lego Marvel Super Heroes, voiced by JB Blanc.
- Kraven the Hunter appears as a boss in The Amazing Spider-Man 2 film tie-in game, voiced by Steve Blum in the console version and Nolan North in the mobile version.
  - In the console version, Kraven is a renowned hunter. After being hired by Wilson Fisk to eliminate the latter's rivals and hunt down Oscorp's failed cross-species experiments, Kraven manipulates Spider-Man into helping him by engaging in vigilantism and serving as a mentor to him until Spider-Man discovers the truth and defeats him.
  - In the mobile version, Kraven is the leader of the Russian Mob and a rival of Hammerhead.
- Kraven the Hunter appears in Marvel Heroes.
- Kraven the Hunter appears as a playable character in Marvel: Future Fight. This version is a member of the Sinister Six.
- Kraven the Hunter appears as a playable character in Marvel Puzzle Quest.
- Kraven the Hunter appears as a playable character and boss in Lego Marvel Super Heroes 2, voiced by Ronan Summers.
- Kraven the Hunter appears as the main antagonist for the first half of the game Spider-Man 2, voiced by Jim Pirri. This version is the leader of a group of private mercenaries called the "Hunters" who seeks to hunt various superpowered individuals in the hopes of finding someone he considers a worthy opponent to fight and kill him in battle before he dies of terminal cancer. Additionally, he killed his family and several supervillains (including Vulture, Shocker, Electro, and Scorpion) off-screen as part of his quest. After nearly killing Spider-Man, Kraven fights Harry Osborn / Venom, who overpowers and kills him.

=== Miscellaneous ===
- Kraven the Hunter appears in The Amazing Spider-Man (1977).
- Kraven the Hunter appears in Spider-Man: Turn Off the Dark, portrayed by Christopher Tierney. In some productions, this version was an Oscorp scientist who was experimented on by the Green Goblin while in others, he was the comics' portrayal of Kraven. In all productions, he becomes a member of the Sinister Six.
- A future incarnation of Kraven appears in Marvel's Wastelanders: Old Man Star-Lord, voiced by Patrick Page.
- Kraven the Hunter appears in a 1966 Aurora plastic model kit.

== See also ==
- "The Gauntlet and Grim Hunt"
- The Most Dangerous Game
