= Diablo (Marvel Comics) =

Marvel Comics character

- Diablo as depicted in Spider-Gwen: Ghost-Spider #3 (December 2018). Art by Carlos Pacheco and Paul Mounts.

Publication information
- Publisher: Marvel Comics
- First appearance: Fantastic Four #30 (September 1964)
- Created by: Stan Lee (writer); Jack Kirby (artist)

In-story information
- Alter ego: Esteban Corazón De Ablo
- Species: Human mutate
- Team affiliations: Legion Accursed; Masters of Evil
- Partnerships: Gilded Lily; Dragon Man
- Notable aliases: Esteban Diablo; Esteban Corazón del Diablo; Al Bidd
- Abilities: Genius intelligence; Extended lifespan; Mastery of alchemy

Diablo (Esteban Corazón de Ablo) is a supervillain appearing in American comic books published by Marvel Comics. The character is depicted as an evil alchemist, and an enemy of the Fantastic Four. Created by writer Stan Lee and artist Jack Kirby, the character first appeared in Fantastic Four #30 (September 1964).

== Publication history ==
Diablo was created by writer Stan Lee and artist Jack Kirby, and first appeared in Fantastic Four #30 (September 1964).

In a 2013 interview with Chris Hardwick, creator Lee said that Diablo was his greatest regret because he could not remember the character aside from his name, who he is, and why he did what he did. He stated: "When you create a character you should feel you know him".

== Fictional character biography ==
Esteban Corazón de Ablo was a court alchemist in 9th-century Saragossa. Isolated and obsessive, he made a pact with Mephisto, trading his soul for longer life as he sought the secret of immortality. Over the years, his mastery of alchemy advanced to the point where he could break the known laws of science, but it was not enough. Seeking even more power, he relocated his lab to Transylvania in the 19th century and formed an alliance with vampires, hoping to learn the secrets of the supernatural. The villagers, fearing Diablo, stormed the alchemist's castle and buried him alive.

One century later, the Fantastic Four visit Transylvania on vacation; observing the group, Diablo convinces the Thing to free him by creating an elixir that partially reverses his transformation. In exchange for the Thing's services, Diablo promises to make him fully human. The other members of the Fantastic Four learn of this, but are forced to leave the Thing behind when he chooses to remain with Diablo.

After acclimating to the 20th century, Diablo reinvents himself as a private entrepreneur and quickly amasses great wealth by selling his creations. Mister Fantastic analyzes some of his chemicals and discovers that their effects were only temporary, which Diablo had deliberately concealed. After this information is made public, the world turns on Diablo, but he has already built up an army of loyal followers and prepares to conquer Earth. At the same time, the Thing reverts to his normal form and turns on Diablo, who seals him in an unbreakable glass capsule. The Fantastic Four battle Diablo, who is soon buried alive once again. Diablo later escapes using one of his potions and returns to face the Fantastic Four on numerous occasions.

It was later revealed that Diablo had a romantic relationship with the woman who became the criminal Gilded Lily. Diablo was freed from prison by Gilded Lily, though he turned against her and was defeated by Alpha Flight. Diablo later attacked the Fantastic Four, again using elementals against them. Diablo conquered the country of Tierra del Maiz, and in another clash with Alpha Flight, he was apparently killed.

However, Diablo survived and reappeared again later. He was later responsible for the destruction of the Fantastic Four's headquarters, Pier 4. He aided the Fantastic Four in driving the chaos demon Shuma-Gorath back to its home dimension.

He was later seen in Vieques, an island–municipality of Puerto Rico, where he helped Spider-Man and the Human Torch defeat a giant radioactive sea monster that was devouring the residents and tourists.

During The Gauntlet storyline, Diablo is present with Electro, Ana Kravinoff, Sasha Kravinoff, and Alyosha Kravinoff when Mattie Franklin is sacrificed as part of a ritual that resurrects Vladimir Kravinoff as a humanoid lion creature.

During the Origin of the Species storyline, Diablo is invited by Doctor Octopus to join his supervillain team, where he promises them that they will receive a reward in exchange for securing some specific items for him. After Lily Hollister's baby is kidnapped by the Chameleon, Spider-Man embarks on a rampage against any villains involved. The police recover a web ball containing Spot, Diablo, and Overdrive.

In Secret Avengers, Scorpio recruits Diablo into the Masters of Evil.

== Powers and abilities ==
Diablo is a practitioner of the alchemic sciences, based upon reconstructing molecules by mystical means, and has obtained this knowledge through study. Thanks to his tutors, he was educated and is self-taught in these arcane arts. His youth and vitality have been lengthened, due to a longevity serum. He can affect his own body by changing the appearance to look like a different person or become "nerveless protoplasm", which protects him from certain forms of harm.

=== Equipment ===
Diablo employs a huge arsenal of alchemical weapons that he discovered or invented, and conceals within hidden pouches and pockets in his costume. But unknown to science, his concoctions are almost magical in nature. Although the range of his power is wide, these effects are temporary unless Diablo provides a second dose, with the exception of an elixir he used on Dragon Man. His mixtures include nerve gas pellets, freezing potions, and pills that make people susceptible to Diablo's hypnotic orders. He can also transmute non-organic matter, unleash explosive blasts, model surface features, give life to inanimate objects, and create beings formed from the elements of earth, fire, wind, and water called "elementals". Other concoctions utilize teleportation for quick escapes.

== Other versions ==
=== Age of Apocalypse ===
An alternate universe version of Diablo from Earth-295 appears in Age of Apocalypse. This version is a warden at Apocalypse's prison in Mexico until he is killed by Nightcrawler.

=== Marvel Zombies ===
In the Marvel Zombies reality, Diablo appears as one of the many zombified super-powered beings hoping for access to the Kingpin's human cloning vats until he is killed by Machine Man.

=== Ultimate Marvel ===
An alternate universe version of Diablo from Earth-1610 appears in Ultimate Fantastic Four. This version is Menendez Flores, a 15th-century Italian man who was imprisoned in an inescapable tower by fellow alchemist Andrea Vecchiato.

== In other media ==
=== Television ===
- Diablo appears in a self-titled episode of Fantastic Four (1967), voiced by Regis Cordic.
- Diablo appears in the Fantastic Four: World's Greatest Heroes episode "Johnny Storm and the Potion of Fire", voiced by Trevor Devall.
- Diablo appears in Marvel Disk Wars: The Avengers, voiced by Tomohisa Aso in the Japanese version and Matthew Mercer in the English dub.

=== Video games ===
- Diablo appears in Fantastic Four (2005), voiced by André Sogliuzzo.
- Diablo appears in Marvel Contest of Champions.

=== Miscellaneous ===
The one-shot comic Fantastic Four: First Foes – Dragon Man (2026) features Damien Albo, an original character based on Diablo.
