= The Gauntlet and Grim Hunt =

2009–2010 Spider-Man storylines

"The Gauntlet"
- Promotional image from Web of Spider-Man (vol. 2) #1 (December 2009); Art by Adi Granov
- Publisher: Marvel Comics
- Publication date: November 2009 – July 2010
- Genre: Superhero
- Title(s): The Amazing Spider-Man #611–637; Web of Spider-Man vol. 2 #2–7; Grim Hunt: The Kraven Saga; Amazing Spider-Man: Origin of the Hunter
- Main character: Spider-Man

Creative team
- Writer(s): Mark Waid; Fred Van Lente; Joe Kelly; Dan Slott; Marc Guggenheim; Roger Stern; Zeb Wells
- Artist(s): Barry Kitson; Paul Azaceta; Javier Pulido; Marcos Martin; Nick Dragotta; Michael Lark; Max Fuimara; Joe Quinones; Francis Portela; Michael Gaydos; Marcos Checchetto; Phillipe Briones; Jefte Palo; Chris Bachalo; Emma Rios; Lee Weeks
- Letterer: VC's Joe Caramagna

"The Gauntlet" and "Grim Hunt" are 2009–2010 comic book storylines published by Marvel Comics. Despite being more issues, "The Gauntlet" was solicited as leading up to the "Grim Hunt" story, and the two storylines are interconnected. Written by The Amazing Spider-Man architects (Mark Waid, Marc Guggenheim, Fred Van Lente and Joe Kelly), "The Gauntlet" is not a strict event or storyline; it is the branding that indicates the direction of Spider-Man's life. In effect it is an event similar to Dark Reign only focusing on Spider-Man and his circle. "Grim Hunt" directly follows "The Gauntlet" and acts as a sequel of sorts to "Kraven's Last Hunt". The storyline received generally positive reviews.

== Premise ==
The story features many old Spider-Man villains: Sandman, Electro, Chameleon, Mysterio, Hammerhead, Lizard, Morbius, the Living Vampire and Rhino as well as appearances by Deadpool, Scorpion II, Vulture (Jimmy Natale), and Juggernaut.

The Gauntlet is basically the over-arching theme of the Spidey stories starting in November. It's built of individual stories bring back Spidey's classic enemies. So it's not some 18-part story, where you're going to see "The Gauntlet Part 7" and "Part 8" and so on. What it is is sort of a branding for the level of conflict building in Spider-Man's life. The classic villains returning one after the other, but they're not necessarily working together. There's not some secret mastermind behind it all, bringing them all together. The fact that it's so relentless and that these battles and fights build throughout several months is going to have a cost for Peter Parker, and perhaps someone is going to take advantage of that.

— The Amazing Spider-Man editor Steve Wacker

== Plot summary ==
=== The Gauntlet preludes ===
A revamped Doctor Octopus temporarily takes over New York City as Ana Kravinoff captures Madame Web. The Chameleon returns and is then recruited by Sasha Kravinoff after his defeat by Spider-Man.

Ana Kravinoff tortures and drugs Madame Web to find out information about Spider-Man, then she recruits Diablo after Spider-Man defeats him.

Deadpool is hired by Ana Kravinoff to distract Spider-Man while she captures Mattie Franklin. This occurs when Spider-Man is fighting a female version of the Stilt-Man.

=== The Gauntlet ===
==== Power to the People ====
Electro's powers are deteriorating and he has been left in ruin by the stock market. Seeing that Dexter Bennett has secured a bailout from the federal government to save the Daily Bugle, he starts a public and social media movement to turn the people of New York against Dexter Bennett and the New York Stock Exchange for their greed. Because of this, Electro is believed to be a hero to the people of New York and, when Spider-Man tries to fight him, they turn against him. Electro has been offered a very expensive cure for his declining health by the Mad Thinker, but is unable to pay for it. To get the money for the cure, he makes a deal with Dexter Bennett in exchange for calling off the campaign against him. The Mad Thinker attempts to cure Electro, turning him into an artificial electrical thunderbolt, but Spider-Man intervenes. Electro uses this power to betray Bennett. Spider-Man eventually defeats him, but not before Bennett is crippled by falling debris and the Daily Bugle is destroyed. Electro is then shown in the epilogue running into Sasha Kravinoff and the Chameleon in his new jail cell.

==== Keemia's Castle ====
Spider-Man helps Carlie Cooper with an investigation involving three murders and a missing girl named Keemia Alvarado. Someone manages to steal three top secret files about the three murders. Spider-Man traces the murderer to Governor's Island, where he finds Keemia. Sandman is revealed to be on the island and he proclaims himself as Keemia's father. In the very next issue, a few of the copies of Sandman, after confronting Spider-Man, confess that they are the actual killer of the mother and two others. Sandman, shocked that his own duplicates could free themselves from his control, begins battling his other duplicates. Spider-Man then obliterates Sandman with a fan, and gets back to Manhattan with Keemia. Keemia is then taken into foster care against her and Peter's will.

==== Rage of The Rhino ====
A new villain in a Rhino suit is told by Sasha Kravinoff that he can gain honor by killing Aleksei Sytsevich, the original Rhino. However, Aleksei no longer has his Rhino suit and is living with his new wife Oksana. Meanwhile, Peter begins working full-time at the Front Line and on his first story the new Rhino attacks Aleksei. Spider-Man fights the new Rhino to protect Aleksei and is defeated. He later meets up with Aleksei, who managed to get away and convinces him not to put his Rhino suit back on.

==== Mysterioso ====
The Maggia is on the brink of destruction due to the loss of Silvermane during his gang's shoot-out against Owl's gang, Bruno Karnelli's bad leadership, and fighting with Mister Negative, as well as Hammerhead siding with him. The Maggia hires Mysterio to help them get out of their problems, but he accepts only to serve his purposes. In a fight between the Maggia, Mister Negative, and Spider-Man, most of the Maggia die and Mysterio loses all of the money he gained through this endeavor. Afterwards, Mysterio is approached by Chameleon (disguised as Jean DeWolff) who tells Mysterio that he has some friends that are "dying to meet him."

==== Out for Blood ====
Black Cat helps Spider-Man to steal the vial of Peter's blood that Mister Negative has and replaces it with a vial of pig blood, so Mister Negative is unaware of losing the ability to kill Spider-Man through his Devil's Breath formula.

==== It is the Life ====
Spider-Man discovers that Morbius was behind the theft of his blood and was using to it to try to find a cure for the zombie virus that has infected Jack Russell. Spider-Man volunteers to give him more blood. In the issue, there is also a side-story "The Five Stages of Grief" written by The Spectacular Spider-Man TV series co-creator Greg Weisman. It shows Flash Thompson dealing with the five stages of grief for losing his legs during the Iraq War.

==== Scavengers ====
Electro breaks the new Vulture out of prison. He wants revenge on the person who turned him into a monster, and he is told that J. Jonah Jameson did this to him. The mob starts pulling up fake claims that Jameson had created the new Vulture and the media gets a hold of it. Spider-Man finds out and arrives at City Hall just in time to save Jameson. The Vulture manages to escape when Spider-Man runs out of web fluid. The Vulture learns the truth about Jameson and the mob and attacks the gangsters. Meanwhile, Peter decides to edit a photo to prove Jameson's innocence. However, Jameson reveals that the photo is a fake and fires Peter in public, who ends up running out of City Hall. Peter wonders how things could get worse for him as the Vulture flies overhead.

==== Endangered Species ====
In a continuation of the story "Rage of The Rhino" from The Amazing Spider-Man #617. Aleksei and his wife try to go into hiding in protective custody, but the new Rhino attacks the vehicle taking them to a safehouse and Oksana is killed. Aleksei is so enraged by this he re-dons his old Rhino suit and fights the new Rhino. Spider-Man tries to stop all of this from happening, but he fails. In the end, the old Rhino kills the new Rhino.

==== The Sting ====
After quitting S.H.I.E.L.D., Carmilla Black has taken up independent contracts. Sasha Kravinoff hires her to steal Mac Gargan's original Scorpion costume from the Hood, who plans to award it to the low-level crook that impresses him after receiving the Scorpion costume from Norman Osborn. The Scorpion stings Spider-Man and he temporarily loses his powers. Meanwhile, Michelle Gonzalez arrives to the ensuing fight to stop the man she was defending in court to ruin his second chance. Peter saves her, then changes into Spider-Man now that his powers are back. He saves Scorpion from the Hood and she manages to deliver the suit. When Peter gets back to his and Michelle's apartment, the two agree to a truce.

==== Something Can Stop the Juggernaut ====
In a sequel to that story "Nothing Can Stop the Juggernaut!", a new Captain Universe is created by the Uni-Power possessing a man named William Nguyen to fix fractures in the tectonic plates beneath New York City that were created during the "Nothing Can Stop the Juggernaut!" story. Captain Universe instead tries to kill the Juggernaut and Spider-Man gets involved trying to save the Juggernaut's life. When the new Captain Universe insists on killing the Juggernaut instead of fixing the tectonic plates as Juggernaut ruined his life, the Uni-Power leaves him and enters the Juggernaut. The Juggernaut uses the power of Captain Universe to repair the damage to the tectonic plates, Spider-Man then arranges for amends between Juggernaut and Nguyen. Issue #628 also features a short story of Spider-Man and Iron Man fighting Absorbing Man.

==== Shed ====
Dr. Curt Connors has a new job and he has lost custody of his son Billy Connors. After his boss berates him and prevents him from taking his Lizard suppressant, Connors transforms and eats his boss. Billy Connors is kidnapped by Ana Kravinoff after she left his foster mother for dead, and Ana abandons Billy when the Lizard arrives. Connors's personality fights with his reptilian will, but the Lizard drowns out Connors's and eats Billy while Ana and Alyosha watch on. Then the Lizard sheds his skin and becomes a new form. This form is smarter than any previous form of the Lizard and has the telepathic abilities to connect to the "lizard part" of the human brain. However, some of Connors's emotions were passed to this new Lizard, which causes him regret for what he has done.

=== "Grim Hunt" preludes ===
In The Amazing Spider-Man: Grim Hunt: The Kraven Saga #1, Spider-Man has a dream revealing the dark future that awaits him and his kin. In the Amazing Spider-Man: Origin of the Hunter one-shot, Ana Kravinoff looks over some of her father's journals recounting the original Kraven's skirmishes with Spider-Man.

=== "Grim Hunt" ===
Peter is approached at his apartment by a severely wounded Kaine. Then an explosion is heard outside and Peter sees Arachne fighting Ana and Alyosha Kravinoff, so he rushes to help her. After a battle with them, they go to Mattie Franklin's apartment where they find Ezekiel Sims, a wall-crawling superhuman who had died prior to these events. Ezekiel starts to talk about a war between spiders and hunters. Mattie Franklin is killed by Sasha Kravinoff as a sacrifice that resurrects Vladimir Kravinoff as a large human-lion hybrid creature. Sasha says they will need the blood of Spider-Man to properly resurrect Sergei.

Spider-Man, Arachne, and Ezekiel go to search for Araña who is the next target. They find her already under attack by the Kravinoffs and join the fight. However, they are defeated and Arachne and Araña are captured. Kaine arrives late since the Kravinoffs already escaped and tells Spider-Man that he should run. Spider-Man and Ezekiel have a long discussion before they leave for the Kravinoff's base. Once there, Ezekiel reveals himself to be the Chameleon, and Spider-Man is defeated. In the presence of the Kravinoffs and Mysterio, Spider-Man is then put on a table where he is killed with a knife. With Spider-Man's death, Sergei Kravinoff steps out of his grave.

Kraven gets acquainted with his family after his awakening. Kraven states that Sasha restored him with corrupted blood, or the "unlife". They pull off the mask of the corpse of Spider-Man hung in their mantel and find out that it is Kaine in Spider-Man's costume. Peter finds a coffin with Kaine's corpse along with his black suit with a note from Kraven reading "Hunt Me".

Spider-Man puts his black suit on again and goes on to take revenge on the Kravinoff family. Madame Web is killed by Sasha. Before dying, she transfers her powers to Arachne. Spider-Man defeats the Chameleon, Alyosha, and Vladimir. He then ambushes Sasha and violently tears part of Sasha's face off with his wall-climbing power for what happened to Mattie Franklin, Madame Web, and Kaine. While Spider-Man fights Kraven, Araña fights both Sasha and Ana. Spider-Man defeats Kraven and is about to kill him with a spear when Kraven whispers "thank you" and Arachne begs Spider-Man not to kill Kraven. Arachne shows him a future where Spider-Man turned into an outcast killer because of killing Kraven. With Spider-Man silent, Kraven begs him to end his life as he believes that his life is linked to Spider-Man and that he cannot die by any other hand, and while he was dead, he was apparently in a better place. Due to the visions that Arachne received, Spider-Man reluctantly lets Kraven live and states that his return gave him a second chance and he should use it. Spider-Man idly suggests that Kraven should go and be a dentist or something. The Kravinoff family then disappear in a flash, leaving the spiders alone before they can hand them over to the authorities. Spider-Man, Araña (now in Arachne's costume) and Arachne (no longer in costume, and now blind due to her gaining Madame Web's powers) bury Kaine and Cassandra in a potter's field. Arachne, now the new Madame Web, predicts that the Kravinoffs will be back, simultaneously assuring Spider-Man and Araña that she is fine with the trade-off of her vision for Madame Web's powers. In the Savage Land, Kraven decides to hunt his own family where if they survive long enough, they could be called a Kravinoff. He breaks Sasha's neck for arguing back and euthanizes Vladimir due to respect for the dead. Alyosha then leaves, but Ana then makes a deal with Kraven: if she kills her brother, he will train her and create a stronger family. If not, he will forget about family. In the epilogue, Kaine crawls out of his grave, mutated into a more spider-like form – including six extra eyes in a spider-like pattern – now referred to as 'Tarantula', implied to be the result of Kraven's resurrection creating an imbalance.

== Other versions ==
=== What If? ===
- An alternative possibility for the events of Grim Hunt begins with the decision of Spider-Man to kill Kraven as Kraven insisted. Spider-Man is conflicted and runs back into the arms of Mary Jane after killing Kraven. She is thrilled until she finds an issue of a newspaper that pegs Spider-Man as the murderer of Kraven. He says it was a mistake coming to her. After a heated exchange with Mary Jane at the bridge, he goes to his apartment as Peter Parker to find an intervention waiting for him, and drunkenly confesses to Spider-Man having murdered Norman Osborn in the Raft. After being refuted, he decides to discard his Spider-Man self and lives the life of Kraven. He has the Kravinoff family under his command. Julia Carpenter, the new Madame Web, uses her own army of Spiders - Venom, Anti-Venom, and Spider-Woman - to fight Peter. The battle takes the lives of all involved, except Peter and a wounded Madame Web. Madame Web teleports to get Araña to confront and defeat Peter. Peter ends up blinded by a shotgun he was attempting to use on her. Araña takes over as the head Spider, while Peter is left permanently blinded and distant from Mary Jane.

== Reception ==
- The Amazing Spider-Man #612 received a rating of 7.8 out of 10 from IGN.
- The Amazing Spider-Man #613 received a rating of 8.3 out of 10 from IGN.
- The Amazing Spider-Man #614 received a rating of 8.6 out of 10 from IGN, and a rating of 3.0 out of 5 from Comic Book Resources.
- The Amazing Spider-Man #615 received a rating of 8.3 out of 10 from IGN, and a rating of 4.0 out of 5 from Comic Book Resources.
- The Amazing Spider-Man #616 received a rating of 8.5 out of 10 from IGN.
- The Amazing Spider-Man #617 received a rating of 9.0 out of 10 from IGN, a rating of 4.0 out of 5 from Comic Book Resources, and a positive review from Newsarama.
- The Amazing Spider-Man #618 received a rating of 7.8 out of 10 from IGN, and a rating of 3.5 out of 5 from Comic Book Resources.
- The Amazing Spider-Man #619 received a rating of 7.0 out of 10 from IGN, and a rating of 3.5 out of 5 from Comic Book Resources.
- The Amazing Spider-Man #620 received a rating of 7.8 out of 10 from IGN, and a positive review from Newsarama.
- The Amazing Spider-Man #621 received a rating of 7.0 out of 10 from IGN.
- The Amazing Spider-Man #622 received a rating of 8.7 out of 10 from IGN, and a rating of 3.0 out of 5 from Comic Book Resources.
- The Amazing Spider-Man #623 received a rating of 6.3 out of 10 from IGN, and a rating of 3.5 out of 5 from Comic Book Resources.
- The Amazing Spider-Man #624 received a rating of 7.6 out of 10 from IGN.
- The Amazing Spider-Man #625 received a rating of 9.0 out of 10 from IGN, and a rating of 4.0 out of 5 from Comic Book Resources.
- The Amazing Spider-Man #626 received a rating of 8.1 out of 10 from IGN.
- The Amazing Spider-Man #627 received a rating of 6.0 out of 10 from IGN, a rating of 4.0 out of 5 from Comic Book Resources, and a positive review from Newsarama.
- The Amazing Spider-Man #628 received a rating of 6.5 out of 10 from IGN, and a rating of 3.5 out of 5 from Comic Book Resources.
- The Amazing Spider-Man #629 received a rating of 6.7 out of 10 from IGN.
- The Amazing Spider-Man #630 received a rating of 8.3 out of 10 from IGN, a rating of 3.0 out of 5 from Comic Book Resources, and a positive review from Newsarama.
- The Amazing Spider-Man #631 received a rating of 7.4 out of 10 from IGN.
- The Amazing Spider-Man #632 received a rating of 8.1 out of 10 from IGN.
- The Amazing Spider-Man #633 received a rating of 8.5 out of 10 from IGN.
- The Amazing Spider-Man #634 received a rating of 8.5 out of 10 from IGN, and a rating of 3.5 out of 5 from Comic Book Resources.
- The Amazing Spider-Man #635 received a rating of 9.0 out of 10 from IGN, and a rating of 4.5 out of 5 from Comic Book Resources.
- The Amazing Spider-Man #636 received a rating of 8.0 out of 10 from IGN, and a rating of 2.0 out of 5 from Comic Book Resources.
- The Amazing Spider-Man #637 received a rating of 7.0 out of 10 from IGN, and a mixed review from Newsarama.

== Collected editions ==
Title	Material collected	Legacy	Format	Pages	Released	ISBN
The Gauntlet Book 1 - Electro And Sandman	Amazing Spider-Man #612-616; Dark Reign: The List - Amazing Spider-Man; "Origins: Electro" from Web of Spider-Man (vol. 2) #2	#612-616	HC	176	3 Mar 2010	978-0785142645
The Gauntlet Book 1 - Electro And Sandman	Amazing Spider-Man #612-616; Dark Reign: The List - Amazing Spider-Man; "Origins: Electro" from Web of Spider-Man (vol. 2) #2	#612-616	TPB	176	28 Jul 2010	978-0785138716
The Gauntlet Book 2 - Rhino And Mysterio	Amazing Spider-Man #617-621; "Origins: Rhino" from Web of Spider-Man (vol. 2) #3; "Origins: Mysterio" from Web of Spider-Man (vol. 2) #4	#617-621	HC	160	28 Apr 2010	978-0785142652
The Gauntlet Book 2 - Rhino And Mysterio	Amazing Spider-Man #617-621; "Origins: Rhino" from Web of Spider-Man (vol. 2) #3; "Origins: Mysterio" from Web of Spider-Man (vol. 2) #4	#617-621	TPB	160	15 Sep 2010	978-0785138723
The Gauntlet Book 3 - Vulture And Morbius	Amazing Spider-Man #622-625; "Origins: Vulture" from Web of Spider-Man (vol. 2) #5	#622-625	HC	128	2 Jun 2010	978-0785146117
The Gauntlet Book 3 - Vulture And Morbius	Amazing Spider-Man #622-625; "Origins: Vulture" from Web of Spider-Man (vol. 2) #5	#622-625	TPB	128	3 Nov 2010	978-0785146124
The Gauntlet Book 4 - Juggernaut	Amazing Spider-Man #229-230, #626-629	#626-629	HC	152	18 Aug 2010	978-0785146131
The Gauntlet Book 4 - Juggernaut	Amazing Spider-Man #229-230, #626-629	#626-629	TPB	152	19 Jan 2011	978-0785146148
The Gauntlet Book 5 - Lizard	Amazing Spider-Man #630-633; Web of Spider-Man (vol. 2) #6	#630-633	HC	128	29 Sep 2010	978-0785146155
The Gauntlet Book 5 - Lizard	Amazing Spider-Man #630-633; Web of Spider-Man (vol. 2) #6	#630-633	TPB	128	2 Mar 2011	978-0785146162
Grim Hunt	Amazing Spider-Man #634-637; the Grim Hunt Digital Prologue; the "Loose Ends" story from Amazing Spider-Man: Extra! #3 and "Gauntlet Origins: Kraven" from Web of Spider-Man (vol. 2) #7	#634-637	HC	128	20 Oct 2010	978-0785146179
Grim Hunt	Amazing Spider-Man #634-637; the Grim Hunt Digital Prologue; the "Loose Ends" story from Amazing Spider-Man: Extra! #3 and "Gauntlet Origins: Kraven" from Web of Spider-Man (vol. 2) #7	#634-637	TPB	128	16 Mar 2011	978-0785146186
The Gauntlet: The Complete Collection Vol. 1	Dark Reign: The List - Amazing Spider-Man #1; Amazing Spider-Man #612–626, Annual #37 and material from Web of Spider-Man (2009) #2–5	#612–626	TPB	520	2 Jul 2019	978-1302918453
The Gauntlet: The Complete Collection Vol. 2	Amazing Spider-Man #627–637, Grim Hunt: The Kraven Saga #1; Amazing Spider-Man Presents: Black Cat #1–4 and material from Web of Spider-Man (2009) #6–7	#627–637	TPB	504	22 Sep 2020	978-1302925154

== See also ==
Spider-Man Collected Editions
