= Vermin (character) =

Marvel Comics fictional character

- Vermin as depicted in Fear Itself: Spider-Man #1 (May 2011). Art by Mike McKone (penciler/inker) and Jeremy Cox (colorist).

Publication information
- Publisher: Marvel Comics
- First appearance: Captain America #272 (August 1982)
- Created by: J. M. DeMatteis; Mike Zeck

In-story information
- Alter ego: Edward Whelan
- Species: Human mutate
- Team affiliations: New Revengers
- Partnerships: Baron Zemo; Armin Zola
- Abilities: Accomplished geneticist; As Vermin: Superhuman strength, speed and stamina; Peak level agility, durability and reflexes; Highly acute senses; Razor sharp teeth; Inch-long claw-like fingernails; Ability to control rats and stray dogs; Self-duplication

Vermin (Edward Whelan) is a supervillain appearing in American comic books published by Marvel Comics. The character is usually depicted as an adversary of Captain America and Spider-Man. A geneticist working for Baron Zemo and Arnim Zola, Edward Whelan was subjected to an experiment that mutated him into a humanoid rat, gaining superhuman abilities, as well as the predatory instincts of a rat. The character's most notable appearance was in the storyline "Kraven's Last Hunt".

== Publication history ==
The character's first appearance was in Captain America #272 (August 1982). He was created by J. M. DeMatteis and Mike Zeck.

He became an antagonist for Spider-Man as well in Marvel Team-Up #128 (April 1983), fighting both Captain America and Spider-Man.

== Fictional character biography ==
Edward Whelan suffered severe physical and sexual abuse as a child from his father. As an adult, he is a geneticist working for Helmut Zemo and Primus, who later experiment on him and transform him into a cannibalistic, humanoid rat. Vermin is defeated by Captain America and turned over to S.H.I.E.L.D. He escapes S.H.I.E.L.D., however, and returns to the service of Zola and Zemo.

Some time later, Vermin kidnaps women off the streets into the sewers, and devours them. He is defeated and captured by Kraven the Hunter disguised as Spider-Man; Kraven seeks to prove himself superior to Spider-Man by defeating Vermin alone when Spider-Man needed Captain America to help him. He is forced by Kraven to battle the real Spider-Man, then allowed to escape; he is finally captured and turned over to the police by Spider-Man. During a breakout at the Vault prison, Vermin assists Venom in hunting down prison warden Truman Marsh. Under Venom's orders, Vermin later teams with Powderkeg and Mentallo; they temporarily defeat Iron Man and Hank Pym. Mentallo's powers are used to neutralize the break out.

Vermin eventually escapes the asylum, and attacks his parents at their home in Scarsdale. He is captured by Spider-Man and returned to psychiatric care. Whelan returns to his human form after being treated by Ashley Kafka, which causes him to only transform into Vermin for a few hours at a time.

Whelan and Kafka are kidnapped by a group of other Zemo mutants, who want Whelan to become Vermin again and lead them in their quest for revenge. Instead, Whelan persuades them to surrender themselves for psychiatric treatment so that they can be cured as he was. However, Zemo uses a mind-control device to take control of the mutants and revert Whelan to Vermin, intending to use them as subjects for further experiments. His will strengthened by his psychiatric care, Whelan partially reverts to human form and attacks Zemo. Kafka convinces him to not kill Zemo, and by letting go of his hate Whelan allows "Vermin" to finally die. No longer confined to psychiatric institutions, he submits to trial for his crimes as Vermin, with Matt Murdock agreeing to be his lawyer for the case.

Whelan later relapses and becomes Vermin again. He is incarcerated in the Big House, an experimental prison whose inmates are shrunken via Pym Particles to reduce the chance of them escaping. An escape attempt is thwarted by She-Hulk.

In All-New, All-Different Marvel, Vermin appears as a member of Maker's New Revengers.

During the Hunted storyline, Vermin is captured by Lizard and Taskmaster, who hand him over to Arcade. After securing Vermin in a cave, Arcade injects him with a serum that gives him the ability to clone himself. Vermin overwhelms Spider-Man and nearly kills him until he is saved by Kraven the Hunter.

Edward Whelan appears as an orderly at Ravencroft under the remedial care of Ashley Kafka. The institute is attacked by Spidercide, who rewires Whelan's brain chemistry to make him become Vermin again.

== Powers and abilities ==
Vermin's strength was enhanced by the experimental mutagenic process designed by Arnim Zola, and forced upon him. He resembles a humanoid rat and possesses enhanced strength, durability, senses, and agility. Vermin has the ability to control rats and dogs within a two-mile (3 km) radius of himself. After being subjected to augmentative gene-therapy administered by Arcade, Vermin gained the ability to clone himself through accelerated mitosis.

== Reception ==
In 2021, Comic Book Resources (CBR) ranked Vermin 5th in their "Marvel: 10 Characters Baron Zemo Created In The Comics" list.

== Other versions ==
=== Earth-71290 ===
An alternate universe version of Edward Whelan from Earth-71290 appears in Spider-Society #2. This version works as an assistant to Ashley Kafka at Ravencroft.

=== Ultimate Marvel ===
An alternate universe version of Edward Whelan / Vermin from Earth-1610 appears in All-New Ultimates #7. This version previously worked for S.H.I.E.L.D. until it was dissolved. Following this, he took to living in a sewer system where he developed a psychic connection to Agent Crock and the two became tyrants until they encountered the Young Ultimates. In the ensuing fight, Shadowcat kills Crock, which kills Vermin as well due to their connection.

=== Ultimate Universe ===
An alternate universe version of Vermin from Earth-6160 makes a minor appearance in Ultimate Spider-Man #18 (2024) as one of several villains defeated by Spider-Man and Green Goblin.

== In other media ==
- Vermin was originally meant to appear in Spider-Man (1995).
- Vermin appears as a boss in The Amazing Spider-Man (2012), voiced by Steve Blum. This version is an ordinary rat who was transformed into a humanoid form by Oscorp scientists as part of their experiments with "cross-species".
