= Hunted (comics) =

Comic book storyline

- Publisher: Marvel Comics
- Publication date: February – June 2019
- Genre: Superhero
- Title(s): The Amazing Spider-Man vol. 5 #16–23
- Main character(s): Spider-Man; Kraven the Hunter; Last Son of Kraven; Savage Six; Vulture

Creative team
- Writer: Nick Spencer
- Artist(s): Humberto Ramos; Ryan Ottley

"Hunted" is a 2019 comic book storyline published by Marvel Comics, starring the character Spider-Man. It is a spiritual successor to the 1987 storyline "Kraven's Last Hunt". It involves the characters Spider-Man, Black Cat, Kraven the Hunter, Lizard, Vulture, and Taskmaster as well as the debut of the Last Son of Kraven.

== Plot ==
=== Prelude ===
After cutting a deal with the High Evolutionary, Kraven the Hunter has 87 clones of him created. Ana Kravinoff, Kraven's daughter, is disgusted by this and leaves her father. The clones are trained as the Sons of Kraven and sent out to prove themselves by being hunted by each other. The clone who survives is labeled as the Last Son of Kraven. With help from Taskmaster, Black Ant, and Arcade, Kraven begins capturing animal-themed criminals, intending to hunt them down.

Billy Connors, son of Curt Connors (the Lizard), is captured by Taskmaster and Black Ant along with Black Cat. Black Cat manages to message Spider-Man, telling him her location.

=== Main plot ===
Spider-Man arrives at the place where Black Cat is supposedly held and falls into a trap that exposes him to a disorienting gas. Spider-Man is attacked by the Last Son of Kraven and manages to get the upper hand, but hallucinates Mary Jane Watson dying, which causes the Last Son of Kraven to beat him senselessly. Spider-Man wakes up in Central Park, where he is attacked by Scorpion. The fight is interrupted when they are attacked by robots piloted by hunters.

Spider-Man attempts to help the villains escape from the Hunter-Bots, but there are stopped by a force field around Central Park. Meanwhile, Taskmaster betrays Black Ant, stating that Black Ant is an animal-themed villain like the others he had captured, and tasers Black Ant to get more money. While running away, Vulture pushes Gibbon toward the hunters to buy time for himself, causing Gibbon to be killed.

It is revealed that in order to save his son and his wife from disintegrating (due to the events of "Dead No More: The Clone Conspiracy" where Jackal activated the kill code), Curt injected them with the Lizard formula, turning them into humanoid lizards. Curt also put an inhibitor chip in his spine, which was intended to prevent him from transforming. Lizard offers Taskmaster the antidote if he can take Lizard to Central Park. While traveling there, Lizard and Taskmaster defeat Vermin, freeing innocent bystanders. Taskmaster helps put a taser chip in Lizard's body, and takes him to Arcade.

A Hunter-Bot sees Billy and tries to shoot him, but backs down, not wanting to hurt a child. Lizard finds the cage that Billy was in, but Last Son of Kraven finds Lizard and beats him up. It is revealed that the Hunter-Bots are linked to their pilots, which will kill them if the Hunter-Bots are destroyed. Kraven had planned this effect from the beginning to punish the hunters for killing animals for sport. Black Ant tells Spider-Man that Kraven is located in a castle, but Arcade tells Spider-Man that Kraven is busy and releases clones of Vermin. In a flashback, it is revealed that Vermin was captured by Arcade, who injected him with a serum that gave him the ability to clone himself.

Kraven reveals that if Spider-Man kills him, then the force field and the Hunter-Bots will be deactivated and Black Cat and Billy will be saved. Lizard saves Billy in the nick of time and briefly reconciles with Billy before wandering off, allowing Last Son of Kraven to escape. Spider-Man tells Kraven that he will never be like Kraven because Kraven will do anything to survive including killing his own kin like he did with Sasha, Vladimir, and Alyosha. However, Spider-Man counters that everyone needs some other person to support and care for another in order to survive. Kraven laughs and tells Arcade to deactivate the force field and the Hunter-Bots, allowing the survivors to escape. Kraven tells Spider-Man to save Black Cat and when Spider-Man hesitates, Kraven promises to never hunt again. Kraven goes to his casket where he retrieves the black Spider-Man suit and dons it once more. Last Son of Kraven sees "Spider-Man" and mistakenly kills Kraven, breaking his curse. It was said that Kraven must die by the spider and since Kraven wore the Spider-Man suit, this causes Kraven's "son" to kill him.

=== Aftermath ===
After attending his funeral of his "father", Last Son of Kraven goes to the Kravinoff estate, rips off his clothes, and trashed it out of frustration. Swinging through Central Park, Spider-Man sees that the Great Hunt is over. Captain Marvel confronts Arcade while the controllers of the Hunter-Bots are confronted by Captain America. Black Ant is found hiding in the bushes by Yellowjacket, but escapes with Taskmaster. Peter Parker arrives home to find Mary Jane with a bleeding arm. They both embrace each other as a centipede watches them.

The Last Son of Kraven finds a letter written to him by his "father" that tells him to take on his father's legacy. Last Son of Kraven takes on the aliases of Sergei Kravinoff and Kraven the Hunter; he cuts his hair, wipes off his tiger stripes, and dons a copy of Kraven the Hunter's outfit. At Kraven's funeral, Chameleon is revealed to be one of the attendees as he is pleased that Kraven the Hunter spared him from the Great Hunt.

== Reception ==
The storyline received generally positive reviews, with critics praising the plot, art, and ending. However, the epilogue of the story did receive some criticism.

According to Comic Book Roundup, Amazing Spider-Man Vol 5 Issue 16 received an average score of 7.1 out of 10 based on 14 reviews.

According to Comic Book Roundup, Issue 16 H.U Tie-In received a score of 7.2 out of 10 based on 4 reviews.

According to Comic Book Roundup, Issue 17 received a score of 8.4 out of 10 based on 12 reviews.

According to Comic Book Roundup, Issue 18 received a score of 6.8 out of 10 based on 12 reviews.

According to Comic Book Roundup, Issue 18 H.U Tie-In received a score of 8.1 out of 10 based on 8 reviews.

According to Comic Book Roundup, Issue 19 received a score of 7.9 out of 10 based on 10 reviews.

According to Comic Book Roundup, Issue 19 H.U Tie-In received a score of 8.3 out of 10 based on 6 reviews.

According to Comic Book Roundup, Issue 20 received a score of 8 out of 10 based on 9 reviews.

According to Comic Book Roundup, Issue 20 H.U Tie-In received a score of 6.8 out of 10 based on 4 reviews.

According to Comic Book Roundup, Issue 21 received a score of 8 out of 10 based on 10 reviews.

According to Comic Book Roundup, Issue 22 received a score of 7.6 out of 10 based on 13 reviews.

According to Comic Book Roundup, Issue 23 received a score of 7.3 out of 10 based on 13 reviews.

== Collected editions ==
Title	Material collected	Published date	ISBN
Amazing Spider-Man by Nick Spencer Vol. 4: Hunted	Amazing Spider-Man (vol. 5) #16-23, 16.HU, 18.HU-20.HU	July 2019	978-1302914349
Amazing Spider-Man by Nick Spencer Omnibus Vol. 1	Amazing Spider-Man (vol. 5) #1-43, 16.HU, 18.HU, 19.HU, 20.HU, Amazing Spider-Man: Full Circle, material from Free Comic Book Day 2018 (Amazing Spider-Man/Guardians of the Galaxy)	October 2022	978-1302946098
