= Kraven's Last Hunt =

Marvel Comics storyline

- Cover of The Amazing Spider-Man 294 (Nov 1987), art by Mike Zeck
- Publisher: Marvel Comics
- Publication date: October – November 1987
- Genre: Superhero; Crossover
Title(s)
Web of Spider-Man #31–32
The Amazing Spider-Man #293–294
Peter Parker, the Spectacular Spider-Man #131–132
- Main character(s): Spider-Man; Kraven the Hunter; Vermin

Creative team
- Writer: J. M. DeMatteis
- Penciller: Mike Zeck
- Inker: Bob McLeod
- Letterer: Rick Parker
- Colorist(s): Bob Sharen; Janet Jackson; Mike Zeck
- Premiere Hardcover: ISBN 0-7851-2330-X

"Kraven's Last Hunt" is a comic book storyline by J. M. DeMatteis and Mike Zeck published in 1987, featuring the final battle between Marvel Comics characters Kraven the Hunter and Spider-Man.

Considered one of the greatest Spider-Man stories, the story was originally published in Web of Spider-Man #31–32, The Amazing Spider-Man #293–294, and Peter Parker, the Spectacular Spider-Man #131–132, and less than two years later it was collected in a trade paperback, and it has been reprinted in that form numerous times since. No title for the overall storyline appears in the original comics, which simply refer to it as "a 6-part saga" on their covers. The initial editions of the trade paperback were titled "Fearful Symmetry: Kraven's Last Hunt", always with the "Kraven's Last Hunt" part in a much larger font, and later editions dropped the "Fearful Symmetry" part of the title entirely. The character Kraven the Hunter was retired from the story's original publication until 2009.

== Development ==
In the mid-1980s, John Marc DeMatteis proposed a Wonder Man limited series involving Wonder Man's half-brother, the Grim Reaper, in which Wonder Man is buried and ultimately crawls out of the grave. Tom DeFalco turned down the proposal. Years later, DeMatteis reworked the scene of a hero coming out of the grave into a Batman story exploring what would happen if the Joker actually killed Batman. According to DeMatteis, it would effectively turn the Joker "sane". When DeMatteis pitched the story to DC, however, it was rejected because it happened to be somewhat similar to Batman: The Killing Joke, another Batman story that was in development at the time. DeMatteis then reworked the story to use Hugo Strange in place of the Joker, but this, too, was rejected. Finally, DeMatteis pitched the idea again to Marvel, this time with Spider-Man and a new villain he came up with specifically for the story. Marvel editorial accepted the revised proposal.

Several major elements were added to the story as DeMatteis began writing it. Marvel's plans to marry Spider-Man and Mary Jane Watson prompted DeMatteis to make their marriage the emotional focus of the story. The idea of substituting Kraven the Hunter for the new villain came to DeMatteis after a chance look at Kraven's entry in the Official Handbook of the Marvel Universe. After Mike Zeck was brought on as penciller for "Kraven's Last Hunt", DeMatteis decided it would be a good idea to use a character he and Zeck had created together: Vermin.

The story was originally intended to run entirely in Peter Parker, the Spectacular Spider-Man, but editor Jim Salicrup decided to publish it as a crossover through all three Spider-Man titles, arguing that the impact of Spider-Man being killed would be lost if there were other Spider-Man stories running at the same time. While working on the story, DeMatteis commented, "I'm not looking beyond those six issues. The storyline really does not enter too heavily into the continuity of the other books. In fact, I almost think you could take these issues and put them on their own as a mini-series or graphic novel."

Because the plot had been completely written by the time Zeck started work on "Kraven's Last Hunt", he drew all six covers for the story before doing any of the interior art. Zeck remarked that the iconic "Resurrection" cover for part 4 (Web of Spider-Man #32) "was the absolute no-brainer of the six covers, and I completed that piece first. If an issue has a scene with the title hero rising from his own grave, it's like receiving the number-one gift on your Christmas list! Anyone spending even one second mulling over a cover idea for that issue would have been in the wrong business. The other covers flowed from that one."

In 1994, DC published DeMatteis' Batman/Joker version of the story as "Going Sane" in Batman: Legends of the Dark Knight #65-68.

== Plot ==
Peter Parker / Spider-Man reflects on his own mortality after the deaths of Ned Leeds and common criminal acquaintance Joe Face. Having grown old and increasingly bitter at the thought of no longer being physically capable of "the hunt", Kraven the Hunter decides to settle things between him and his old nemesis. Kraven hunts down Spider-Man, shoots him with a rifle, and buries him alive.

Kraven dresses as Spider-Man to prove himself superior at his adversary's former activities, thus shattering Spider-Man as the only foe to have ever bested him. The city takes notice as Kraven brutalizes and kills criminals, subverting Spider-Man's no-killing methods. Kraven culminates his crusade with the unarmed capture of the cannibalistic humanoid monster Vermin, who Spider-Man needed the help of Captain America to defeat.

After two weeks, Peter revives from the effects of Kraven's bullet (a potent tranquilizer) and digs his way out of the grave, fighting off traumatizing visions from the tranquilizer and rejecting the animalistic "spider" inside him, proving that he is only a human man with a will fueled by love for his wife, Mary Jane Watson. He reunites with Mary Jane then insists on confronting Kraven despite having not fully recovered. When Spider-Man attacks Kraven, the hunter does not fight back, considering himself the victor for having already beaten and replaced Spider-Man.

To prove his final point of superiority, Kraven releases Vermin and goads him to battle Spider-Man. As expected, the weakened Spider-Man is no match. Kraven allows Vermin to go free and makes it clear to Spider-Man that his hunting days are done.

While Spider-Man goes after Vermin, Kraven concludes he has conquered his inner demons and finally achieved happiness. After reminiscing about his past and the peace he now feels, Kraven commits suicide with his prize rifle. He leaves a confession of his burying and impersonating Spider-Man for the police to find, complete with photographic proof; the publication of these materials clears Spider-Man of Kraven's crimes.

Spider-Man battles Vermin and lures him above ground, where sensory overload renders him helpless. Spider-Man turns Vermin over to the police and vows to get him help from Reed Richards. The final scene is of Kraven's coffin being lowered into the grave shown being dug throughout the story, which had been presumed to be Peter's, showing that Kraven had been digging his own grave the whole time.

== Themes ==
Writer J. M. DeMatteis explained that the story was intended to explore Spider-Man's character and how others perceive him:

What [Kraven] plans to do is kill Spider-Man and then take his place – prove that he can be a better Spider-Man than Spider-Man. What he becomes, of course, is not Spider-Man, but what he perceives Spider-Man to be. In a sense, what Kraven becomes is something akin to Frank Miller's Dark Knight character. [...] One of the things about Peter Parker, with Spider-Man, is that he doesn't just put on a mask and become "the Spider-Man". He doesn't become transformed into this dark creature of the night. No matter what costume he has, no matter what he does, Peter Parker is always a very human, passionate, caring guy. Kraven doesn't know that. And that is the major difference here.

The story is told in between quotations from William Blake's poem "The Tyger", with the word "Tyger" replaced by "Spyder".

== Related stories ==
=== Soul of the Hunter ===
A sequel to "Kraven's Last Hunt" was published in August 1992 as a 48-page prestige format graphic novel titled Amazing Spider-Man: Soul of the Hunter (ISBN 0-87135-942-1), again written by J. M. DeMatteis, drawn by Mike Zeck, and inked by Bob McLeod. "Soul of the Hunter" was done as a response to a widespread misinterpretation of Kraven's suicide in chapter 5 of "Kraven's Last Hunt". DeMatteis recalled, "Tom [DeFalco] had gotten a bunch of letters from people saying, 'Oh, you're glorifying suicide!' Normally I would dismiss that as the usual rantings, except it really disturbed me that people would think that the purpose of that story was to glorify suicide. That is something I would never do. That is not my view of life or the universe."

In this story, Spider-Man is confronted by Kraven's ghost. Unsure what to make of this apparition, Spider-Man goes to Kraven's grave, where he sees an apparition that appears to be Death. Death tells Spider-Man that he and Kraven share a spiritual bond, and that Kraven's soul cannot find the peace it craves because of Kraven's suicide. Spider-Man is then forced to confront Kraven's body from the grave. Defeating it frees Kraven's soul and allows him to rest.

=== Kraven's First Hunt and Grim Hunt ===
Kraven's First Hunt is the title of two unconnected stories: a remake of The Amazing Spider-Man #15 (which includes Kraven's first appearance), in Sensational Spider-Man Annual '96 by J.M. DeMatteis; and the debut of Kraven's teenage daughter, Ana Tatiana Kravinoff, in The Amazing Spider-Man #565-567, who attempts to capture Spider-Man in a similar manner to Kraven in "Kraven's Last Hunt". This leads into the story Grim Hunt, where Kraven's family attempt to resurrect him by sacrificing Spider-Man in an elaborate ritual, only for the ritual to be contaminated when Spider-Man's clone Kaine sacrifices himself to save Peter, resulting in Kraven being reborn as an immortal 'unlife' who can only die by Spider-Man's hand.

== Alternate versions ==
=== Spider-Man: Life Story ===
Spider-Man: Life Story is an alternate continuity in which the characters naturally age after Peter Parker becomes Spider-Man in 1962. In this continuity, Kraven hunts down Spider-Man in the 1980s during the midst of the Cold War shortly after he was diagnosed with cancer. Peter manages to escape the grave Kraven buried him in by bonding with the Venom symbiote, leading him to almost kill Kraven before Mary Jane separates it from him. The traumatic event causes Mary Jane to leave Peter. Kraven is satisfied with Spider-Man becoming the new hunter and prepares to kill himself, but the Venom symbiote bonds with him. Over 35 years later in the final issue, Kraven appears still bonded with the symbiote and attacks Peter and Octavius (possessing Miles Morales' body) in space. Upon separating, it's revealed Kraven has been reduced to bones after being bonded to the symbiote for too long.

=== What If? and What The--?! ===
In (vol. 2) #17 (September 1990) of the Marvel alternative history title What If?, Kraven uses real bullets instead of tranquilizers, thus actually killing Spider-Man and assuming his place. Eventually, at the request of Mary Jane, the heroes Daredevil, Captain America, and the Human Torch all confront Kraven, who eventually returns to Spider-Man's grave and digs up the body. Though not directly shown, it is implied Kraven consumed portions of Peter's body to gain his strength. Afterward, Mary Jane holds a press conference to attempt to clear Peter's name of Kraven's time as Spider-Man, but is unsuccessful in doing so because J. Jonah Jameson intervenes. The televised spectacle of the Human Torch attempting to stop Jameson convinces the public that superheroes are unreliable, leading to the president to ban all super hero activity. Mary Jane vows to fight Jameson's crusade to uphold her husband's legacy.

An issue of Marvel's satire series What The--?! spoofed "Kraven's Last Hunt" as "Raven's Last Hunt." The spoof featured the character's animal likeness, Raven the Hunter, as well as that of Spider-Man, Spider-Ham.

In 2026, DeMatteis wrote a What If? issue with an alternative take to the story. In this continuity, after Peter escapes from the grave, he immediately confronts Kraven at his estate and suffers a mental breakdown from the trauma he endured. Realizing Peter is human and feeling regret over his actions, Kraven brings him to Mary Jane before killing Vermin. Mary Jane and Robbie Robertson take Peter to Ashley Kafka at Ravencroft to help him recover, but the symbiote bonds to him to drive him further into madness while Kraven resumes the Spider-Man identity to make amends. Upon realizing the symbiote is after him, Kraven prepares his body utilizing several forbidden potions and rituals. The symbiote transforms Peter into Venom to confront Kraven at his mansion, but upon seeing Peter fighting off its influence, Kraven goads the symbiote into bonding to him. Kraven utilizes the dark-enchanted herbs to kill the symbiote at the cost of his life. Peter and Mary Jane later visit Kraven's grave, where they question whether he sacrificed himself out of guilt or to save Peter. As they leave, an unknown figure (presumably the Chameleon) approaches Kraven's grave with a shovel.

== Reception ==
"Kraven's Last Hunt" has received critical acclaim and is considered one of the greatest Spider-Man stories ever written. In 2012, "Kraven's Last Hunt" was voted by readers of Comic Book Resources as the greatest Spider-Man story ever told. In his commentary on the results, Brian Cronin described the story as "a breathtaking piece of work that inspired countless imitations by other writers over the years." Elsewhere, Cronin noted that by publishing the story across all three monthly Spider-Man titles, Marvel "gave the story a bit more of an 'event' feel".

Writing for Complex, Jason Serafino ranked "Kraven's Last Hunt" the fifth best Spider-Man story of all time. According to Serafino, "'Kraven's Last Hunt' features the usual comic action, but it also blends aspects from classic literature and recurring themes in order to present a deeper, more complicated narrative. It routinely quotes William Blake's poem 'The Tyger,' and Mike Zeck's art fills the book with gritty photorealism. This one's for a more sophisticated audience."

Comic Book Revolution ranked "Kraven's Last Hunt" third on a list of the top 10 greatest Spider-Man stories, praising the story for its portrayal of both Kraven and the early stages of Peter/Mary Jane marriage. "[E]ven though ‘Kraven's Last Hunt' is a Kraven and Spider-Man story there are a lot of great moments that explore Peter and MJ's relationship. As this story takes place early on in the marriage we get to see how MJ deals with Peter's disappearance and how she would react if Peter ever died in action. It adds extra layers to marriage and makes the end of the story where Peter goes back to MJ to recover that much better."

IGN Comics ranked "Kraven's Last Hunt" the #6 on a list of the 25 greatest Spider-Man stories, noting that it "is one of the most memorable Spider-Man stories of all time, without a doubt." In 2025, ComicBook.com ranked it #1 on their list of the best Spider-Man stories ever told.

== Collected editions ==
| Title | Material collected | Published date | ISBN |
|---|---|---|---|
| Fearful Symmetry: Kraven's Last Hunt | Web of Spider-Man #31-32, Amazing Spider-Man #293-294, Spectacular Spider-Man #131-132 | February 1989 | 0-87135-552-3 |
| Spider-Man: Kraven's Last Hunt | Web of Spider-Man #31-32, Amazing Spider-Man #293-294, Spectacular Spider-Man #131-132 | August 2008 | 978-0785134503 |
| Amazing Spider-Man Epic Collection: Kraven's Last Hunt | Amazing Spider-Man #289-294, Annual #20-21, Spider-Man Versus Wolverine, Web Of Spider-Man #29-32, Peter Parker, The Spectacular Spider-Man #131-132 | June 2017 | 978-1302907051 |
| Spider-Man: Kraven's Last Hunt - Deluxe Edition | Amazing Spider-Man (vol. 1) #15, #293-294, Web Of Spider-Man #31-32, Peter Parker, The Spectacular Spider-Man #131-132, Marvel Team-Up #128, Amazing Spider-Man: Soul Of The Hunter, What If? #17 and material from Sensational Spider-Man Annual '96, Amazing Spider-Man #634-637, What The--?! #3 | August 2018 | 978-1302911843 |

== In other media ==
=== Film ===
Prior to its release, writer Richard Wenk stated that the film Kraven the Hunter would draw inspiration from Kraven's Last Hunt, and include Spider-Man. The final film takes thematic inspiration from the storyline, but ultimately did not feature an appearance by Spider-Man.

=== Prose novel ===
A novelised adaption of Kraven's Last Hunt was released in October 2014 as part of Marvel Prose Novel series, adapted from the original issues and expanded upon by Neil Kleid. In this adaptation, Peter and Mary Jane are not married, due to the changes in continuity that resulted from the "One More Day" story arc. A GraphicAudio audio dramatisation of this novelisation was released in 2016.

=== Marvel Crisis Protocol ===
In the Atomic Mass Games product Marvel Crisis Protocol, the tactics card "Fearful Symmetry" appears as a Tactics card. The card allows the Kraven model to be replaced with a Spider-Man Peter Parker model if Kraven removes the Spider-Man from play. This new Spider-Man is controlled by the player that controlled Kraven previously.

== See also ==
- "The Gauntlet" and "Grim Hunt"
- "Hunted"
