= The Amazing Spider-Man =

Comic book series

- The Amazing Spider-Man No. 1 (March 1963); Cover art by Jack Kirby and Steve Ditko

Publication information
- Publisher: List: Non-Pereil Publishing Group (#1–67) Perfect Film & Chemical Corp. (#68–69) Magazine Management Co. (#70–118) Marvel Comics (#119–present)
- Schedule: Monthly
- Format: Ongoing series
- Genre: Superhero
- Publication date: List: (vol. 1) March 1963 – November 1998 (vol. 2) January 1999 – November 2003 (vol. 1 continued) December 2003 – February 2014 (vol. 3) June 2014 – October 2015 (vol. 4) December 2015 – September 2017 (vol. 5) July 2018 – March 2022 (vol. 6) April 2022 – March 2025 (vol. 7) April 2025 – Present
- No. of issues: List: (vol. 1) 442 (#1–441 plus #–1) and 31 Annuals (vol. 2) 58 and 3 Annuals (vol. 1 cont.) 222 (#500–700 plus issues #654.1, 679.1, 699.1, 700.1, 700.2, 700.3, 700.4, and 700.5, #789–801) and 6 Annuals (vol. 3) 28 (#1–20.1 plus issues #1.1, 1.2, 1.3, 1.4, 1.5, 16.1, 17.1, 18.1, 19.1, and 20.1) and 1 Annual (vol. 4) 38 (#1–32 plus issues #1.1, 1.2, 1.3, 1.4, 1.5, and 1.6) and 1 Annual (vol. 5) 104 (#1–93 plus issues #16.HU, 18.HU, 19.HU, 20.HU, 50.LR, 51.LR, 52.LR, 78.BEY, 80.BEY, 88.BEY, 92.1) and 1 Annual (vol. 6) 70 (#1–70 plus issues #65.DEATHS and 68.DEATHS) (vol. 7) 36 (#1-36) (as of August 2026 cover date)
- Main character: Spider-Man

Creative team
- Created by: Stan Lee; Steve Ditko
- Written by: List: (vol. 1) Stan Lee (scripts) and Steve Ditko (co-plots, later plots) (1–38), Stan Lee (39–100, 105–110, 116–118, Annual #1-5, 18), Roy Thomas (101-104), Gerry Conway (111–149), Archie Goodwin (150, 181, Annual #11), Len Wein (151–180, Annual #10), Marv Wolfman (182–204, Annual #13), Dennis O'Neil (207–219, 221, 223, Annual #14–15), Roger Stern (206, 224–227, 229–252, Annual #15–17), Tom DeFalco (-1, 251–261, 263, 265, 268-269, 271–273, 276–285, 365, 375, 407–439, Annual #18, 22-24, 1996, 1998), Christopher Priest (284–288), Peter David (289), Ann Nocenti (295), David Michelinie (205, 290–292, 296–352, 359–388, Annual #21-28), J. M. DeMatteis (223, 293-294, 368-370, 373, 389–406), John Byrne (440–441) (vol. 2) Howard Mackie (1–29), John Byrne (1, 13-14), J. Michael Straczynski, (30–58) (vol. 1 continued) J. Michael Straczynski (500–545), Marc Guggenheim Zeb Wells Bob Gale (546, 552–554, 558, 562–564, 600, 647) Dan Slott Roger Stern Joe Kelly Fred Van Lente Mark Waid (vol. 3) Dan Slott Gerry Conway (vol. 4) Dan Slott Christos Gage (vol. 5) Nick Spencer (vol. 6) Zeb Wells Joe Kelly (19–20)
- Penciller: List: (vol. 1) Steve Ditko John Romita Sr. Gil Kane Ross Andru Keith Pollard John Romita Jr. Ron Frenz Todd McFarlane Erik Larsen Mark Bagley (vol. 2) John Byrne John Romita Jr. (vol. 1 continued) Mike Deodato Ron Garney Salvador Larroca Chris Bachalo Mike McKone Phil Jimenez Lee Weeks Barry Kitson Paulo Siqueira Paul Azaceta (vol. 3) Ramon Perez Humberto Ramos Giuseppe Camuncoli Olivier Coipel Carlo Barberi (vol. 4) Giuseppe Camuncoli Stuart Immonen Simone Bianchi (vol. 5) Ryan Ottley Humberto Ramos Michele Bandini Chris Bachalo (vol. 6) John Romita Jr.
- Inker: List: (vol. 1) Mike Esposito Frank Giacoia Bob McLeod (vol. 2) Scott Hanna (vol. 1 continued) Joe Pimentel Bill Reinhold Tim Townsend Andy Lanning Klaus Janson Mark Farmer (vol. 3) Victor Olazaba Cam Smith (vol. 4) Cam Smith (vol. 5) Victor Olazaba (vol. 6) Scott Hanna

The Amazing Spider-Man is an ongoing American comic book series featuring the Marvel Comics superhero Spider-Man as its title character and main protagonist. Being in the mainstream continuity of the franchise, it was the character's first title, launching seven months after his introduction in the final issue of Amazing Fantasy. The series began publication with a March 1963 cover date and has been published nearly continuously to date over six volumes with only one significant interruption. Issues of the title currently feature an issue number within its seventh volume, as well as a "legacy" number reflecting the issue's overall number across all Amazing Spider-Man volumes. The title reached 1000 issues in 2026.

The series began as a bimonthly periodical before being increased to monthly after four issues. It was the character's sole monthly headlining title until Peter Parker, the Spectacular Spider-Man would launch in 1976. After 441 issues, The Amazing Spider-Man was restarted in 1999 as issue No. 1 of Volume 2. It ran for 58 issues before reverting to the title's overall issue number with #500 in 2003. The series ran essentially continuously over the first two volumes from 1963 until its landmark 700th issue at the end of 2012 when it was replaced by The Superior Spider-Man as part of the Marvel NOW! relaunch of Marvel's comic lines. The title was occasionally published biweekly during the first two volumes, and was published three times a month from 2008 to 2010. After the relaunch of Action Comics and Detective Comics, The Amazing Spider-Man briefly became the highest-numbered active American comic book.

The Amazing Spider-Man returned with volume 3 in April 2014 following the conclusion of The Superior Spider-Man story arc after 31 issues. In late 2015, the series was relaunched with a fourth volume following the 2015 Secret Wars event. After 45 years, the volume was once again relaunched as part of Marvel Legacy, returning to the overall "legacy" numbering with issue No. 789 in late 2017. Less than a year later, the series was relaunched again with a fifth volume as part of Marvel's Fresh Start. For the first time, although the issue numbers were again restarted from #1, the issues also bore the overall "legacy" issue number. A sixth volume commenced in April 2022 to celebrate Spider-Man's 60th anniversary. Since the second volume, the title has had various release schedules, including monthly and bi-weekly, among others.

== Publication history ==
Writer-editor Stan Lee and artist/co-plotter Steve Ditko created the character of Spider-Man, and the pair produced 38 issues from March 1963 to July 1966. Ditko left after the 38th issue, while Lee remained as writer until issue 100. Since then, many writers and artists have taken over the monthly comic through the years, chronicling the adventures of Marvel's most identifiable hero.

The Amazing Spider-Man has been the character's flagship series for his first fifty years in publication, and was the only monthly series to star Spider-Man until Peter Parker, The Spectacular Spider-Man, in 1976, although 1972 saw the debut of Marvel Team-Up, with the vast majority of issues featuring Spider-Man along with a rotating cast of other Marvel characters. Most of the major characters and villains of the Spider-Man saga have been introduced in Amazing, and with few exceptions, it is where most key events in the character's history have occurred. The title was published continuously until No. 441 (Nov. 1998) when Marvel Comics relaunched it as vol. 2 No. 1 (Jan. 1999), but on Spider-Man's 40th anniversary, this new title reverted to using the numbering of the original series, beginning again with issue No. 500 (Dec. 2003) and lasting until the final issue, No. 700 (Feb. 2013).

=== 1960s ===
Due to strong sales on the character's first appearance in Amazing Fantasy No. 15, Spider-Man was given his own ongoing series in March 1963. The initial years of the series, under Lee and Ditko, chronicled Spider-Man's nascent career as a masked super-human vigilante with his civilian life as hard-luck yet perpetually good-humored and well-meaning teenager Peter Parker. Peter balanced his career as Spider-Man with his job as a freelance photographer for The Daily Bugle under the bombastic editor-publisher J. Jonah Jameson to support himself and his frail Aunt May. At the same time, Peter dealt with public hostility towards Spider-Man and the antagonism of his classmates Flash Thompson and Liz Allan at Midtown High School, while embarking on a tentative, ill-fated romance with Jameson's secretary, Betty Brant.

By focusing on Parker's everyday problems, Lee and Ditko created a flawed, self-doubting superhero, and the first major teenaged superhero to be a protagonist and not a sidekick. Ditko's quirky art provided a stark contrast to the more cleanly dynamic stylings of Marvel's most prominent artist, Jack Kirby.

Most of Spider-Man's key villains and supporting characters were introduced during this time. Issue No. 1 (Mar. 1963) featured the first appearances of J. Jonah Jameson and his astronaut son John Jameson, and the supervillain the Chameleon. It included the hero's first encounter with the superhero team the Fantastic Four. Issue No. 2 (May 1963) featured the first appearance of the Vulture and the Tinkerer as well as the beginning of Parker's freelance photography career at the newspaper The Daily Bugle.

The Lee-Ditko era continued to usher in a significant number of villains and supporting characters, including Doctor Octopus in No. 3 (July 1963); the Sandman and Betty Brant in No. 4 (Sept. 1963); the Lizard in No. 6 (Nov. 1963); Living Brain in No. 8 (Jan. 1964); Electro in No. 9 (Mar. 1964); Mysterio in No. 13 (June 1964); the Green Goblin in No. 14 (July 1964); Kraven the Hunter in No. 15 (Aug. 1964); reporter Ned Leeds in No. 18 (Nov. 1964); and the Scorpion in No. 20 (Jan. 1965). The Molten Man was introduced in No. 28 (Sept. 1965) which also featured Parker's graduation from high school. Peter began attending Empire State University in No. 31 (Dec. 1965), which featured the first appearances of friends and classmates Gwen Stacy and Harry Osborn. Harry's father, Norman Osborn first appeared in No. 23 (April 1965) as a member of Jameson's country club but was not named nor revealed as Harry's father until No. 37 (June 1966).

One of the most celebrated issues of the Lee-Ditko run is No. 33 (Feb. 1966), the third part of the story arc "If This Be My Destiny...!", which features the dramatic scene of Spider-Man, through force of will and thoughts of family, escaping from being pinned by heavy machinery. Comics historian Les Daniels noted that "Steve Ditko squeezes every ounce of anguish out of Spider-Man's predicament, complete with visions of the uncle he failed and the aunt he has sworn to save." Peter David observed that "After his origin, this two-page sequence from Amazing Spider-Man No. 33 is perhaps the best-loved sequence from the Stan Lee/Steve Ditko era." Steve Saffel stated the "full page Ditko image from The Amazing Spider-Man No. 33 is one of the most powerful ever to appear in the series and influenced writers and artists for many years to come." and Matthew K. Manning wrote that "Ditko's illustrations for the first few pages of this Lee story included what would become one of the most iconic scenes in Spider-Man's history." The story was chosen as No. 15 in the 100 Greatest Marvels of All Time poll of Marvel's readers in 2001. Editor Robert Greenberger wrote in his introduction to the story that "These first five pages are a modern-day equivalent to Shakespeare as Parker's soliloquy sets the stage for his next action. And with dramatic pacing and storytelling, Ditko delivers one of the great sequences in all comics."

Although credited only as artist for most of his run, Ditko would eventually plot the stories as well as draw them, leaving Lee to script the dialogue. A rift between Ditko and Lee developed, and the two men were not on speaking terms long before Ditko completed his last issue, The Amazing Spider-Man No. 38 (July 1966). The exact reasons for the Ditko-Lee split have never been fully explained. Spider-Man successor artist John Romita Sr., in a 2010 deposition, recalled that Lee and Ditko "ended up not being able to work together because they disagreed on almost everything, cultural, social, historically, everything, they disagreed on characters..."

In successor penciler Romita Sr.'s first issue, No. 39 (Aug. 1966), nemesis the Green Goblin discovers Spider-Man's secret identity and reveals his own to the captive hero. Romita's Spider-Man – more polished and heroic-looking than Ditko's – became the model for two decades. The Lee-Romita era saw the introduction of such characters as Daily Bugle managing editor Robbie Robertson in No. 52 (Sept. 1967) and NYPD Captain George Stacy, father of Parker's girlfriend Gwen Stacy, in No. 56 (Jan. 1968). The most important supporting character to be introduced during the Romita era was Mary Jane Watson, who made her first full appearance in No. 42 (Nov. 1966), although she first appeared in No. 25 (June 1965) with her face obscured and had been mentioned since No. 15 (Aug. 1964). Peter David wrote in 2010 that Romita "made the definitive statement of his arrival by pulling Mary Jane out from behind the oversized potted plant [that blocked the reader's view of her face in issue no. 25] and placing her on panel in what would instantly become an iconic moment." Romita has stated that in designing Mary Jane, he "used Ann-Margret from the movie Bye Bye Birdie as a guide, using her coloring, the shape of her face, her red hair and her form-fitting short skirts."

Lee and Romita toned down the prevalent sense of antagonism in Parker's world by improving Parker's relationship with the supporting characters and having stories focused as much on the social and college lives of the characters as they did on Spider-Man's adventures. The stories became more topical, addressing issues such as civil rights, racism, prisoners' rights, the Vietnam War, and political elections.

Issue No. 50 (June 1967) introduced the highly enduring criminal mastermind the Kingpin, who would become a major force as well in the superhero series Daredevil. Other notable first appearances in the Lee-Romita era include the Rhino in No. 41 (Oct. 1966), the Shocker in No. 46 (Mar. 1967), the Prowler in No. 78 (Nov. 1969), and the Kingpin's son, Richard Fisk, in No. 83 (Apr. 1970).

=== 1970s ===
Several spin-off series debuted in the 1970s: Marvel Team-Up in 1972, and The Spectacular Spider-Man in 1976. A short-lived series titled Giant-Size Spider-Man began in July 1974 and ran six issues through 1975. Spidey Super Stories, a series aimed at children ages 6–10, ran for 57 issues from October 1974 through 1982. The flagship title's second decade took a grim turn with a story in #89-90 (Oct.-Nov. 1970) featuring the death of Captain George Stacy. This was the first Spider-Man story to be penciled by Gil Kane, who would alternate drawing duties with Romita for the next year-and-a-half and would draw several landmark issues.

One such story took place in the controversial issues #96–98 (May–July 1971). Writer-editor Lee defied the Comics Code Authority with this story, in which Parker's friend Harry Osborn, was hospitalized after over-dosing on pills. Lee wrote this story upon a request from the U. S. Department of Health, Education, and Welfare for a story about the dangers of drugs. Citing its dictum against depicting drug use, even in an anti-drug context, the CCA refused to put its seal on these issues. With the approval of Marvel publisher Martin Goodman, Lee had the comics published without the seal. The comics sold well and Marvel won praise for its socially conscious efforts. The CCA subsequently loosened the Code to permit negative depictions of drugs, among other new freedoms.

"The Six Arms Saga" of #100–102 (Sept.–Nov. 1971) introduced Morbius, the Living Vampire. The second installment was the first Amazing Spider-Man story not written by co-creator Lee, with Roy Thomas taking over writing the book for several months before Lee returned to write #105–110 (Feb.-July 1972). Lee, who was going on to become Marvel Comics' publisher, with Thomas becoming editor-in-chief, then turned writing duties over to 19-year-old Gerry Conway, who scripted the series through 1975. Romita penciled Conway's first half-dozen issues, which introduced the gangster Hammerhead in No. 113 (Oct. 1972). Kane then succeeded Romita as penciler, although Romita would continue inking Kane for a time.

Issue 121 (June 1973 by Conway-Kane-Romita) featured the death of Gwen Stacy at the hands of the Green Goblin in "The Night Gwen Stacy Died." Her demise and the Goblin's apparent death one issue later formed a story arc widely considered as the most defining in the history of Spider-Man. The aftermath of the story deepened both the characterization of Mary Jane Watson and her relationship with Parker.

In 1973 Gil Kane was succeeded by Ross Andru, whose run lasted from issue #125 (Oct. 1973) to #185 (Oct. 1978). Issue#129 (Feb. 1974) introduced the Punisher, who would become one of Marvel Comics' most popular characters. The Conway-Andru era featured the first appearances of the Man-Wolf in #124–125 (Sept.-Oct. 1973); the near-marriage of Doctor Octopus and Aunt May in #131 (Apr. 1974); Harry Osborn stepping into his father's role as the Green Goblin in #135–137 (Aug.-Oct.1974); and the original "Clone Saga", containing the introduction of Spider-Man's clone, in #147–149 (Aug.-Oct. 1975).

Archie Goodwin and Gil Kane produced the title's 150th issue (Nov. 1975) before Len Wein became writer with issue No. 151. During Wein's tenure, Harry Osborn and Liz Allen dated and became engaged; J. Jonah Jameson was introduced to his eventual second wife, Marla Madison; and Aunt May suffered a heart attack. Wein's last story on Amazing was a five-issue arc in #176–180 (Jan.-May 1978) featuring a third Green Goblin (Harry Osborn's psychiatrist, Bart Hamilton).

Marv Wolfman, Marvel's editor-in-chief from 1975 to 1976, succeeded Wein as writer and, in his first issue, #182 (July 1978), had Parker propose marriage to Watson, who refused in the following issue. Keith Pollard succeeded Andru as artist shortly afterward and, with Wolfman, introduced the likable rogue the Black Cat (Felicia Hardy) in #194 (July 1979). As a love interest for Spider-Man, the Black Cat would go on to be an important supporting character for the better part of the next decade and remain a friend and occasional lover into the 2010s.

=== 1980s ===
The Amazing Spider-Man No. 252 (May 1984): Spider-Man's black costume debuts. Cover art by Ron Frenz and Klaus Janson.

The Amazing Spider-Man #200 (Jan. 1980) featured the return and death of the burglar who killed Spider-Man's Uncle Ben. Writer Marv Wolfman and penciler Keith Pollard both left the title by mid-year, succeeded by Dennis O'Neil, a writer known for groundbreaking 1970s work at rival DC Comics, and penciler John Romita Jr. O'Neil wrote two issues of The Amazing Spider-Man Annual which were both drawn by Frank Miller. The 1980 Annual featured a team-up with Doctor Strange while the 1981 Annual showcased a meeting with the Punisher. Roger Stern, who had written nearly 20 issues of sister title The Spectacular Spider-Man, took over Amazing with #224 (Jan. 1982). During his two years on the title, Stern augmented the backgrounds of long-established Spider-Man villains and, with Romita Jr., created the mysterious supervillain the Hobgoblin in #238–239 (Mar.–Apr. 1983). Fans engaged with the mystery of the Hobgoblin's secret identity, which continued throughout #244–245 and 249–251 (Sept.-Oct. 1983 and Feb.-April 1984). One lasting change was the reintroduction of Mary Jane Watson as a more serious, mature woman who becomes Peter's confidante after she reveals that she knows his secret identity. Stern also wrote "The Kid Who Collects Spider-Man" in The Amazing Spider-Man #248 (Jan. 1984), a story which ranks among his most popular.

By mid-1984, Tom DeFalco and Ron Frenz took over scripting and penciling. DeFalco helped establish Parker and Watson's mature relationship, laying the foundation for the characters' wedding in 1987. Notably, in #257 (Oct. 1984), Watson tells Parker that she knows he is Spider-Man, and in #259 (Dec. 1984), she reveals to Parker the extent of her troubled childhood. Other notable issues of the DeFalco-Frenz era include #252 (May 1984), the first appearance of Spider-Man's black costume, which the hero would wear almost exclusively for the next four years' worth of comics; the debut of criminal mastermind the Rose in #253 (June 1984); the revelation in #258 (Nov. 1984) that the black costume is a living being, a symbiote; and the introduction of the female mercenary Silver Sable in #265 (June 1985).

DeFalco and Frenz were both removed from The Amazing Spider-Man in 1986 by editor Jim Owsley under acrimonious circumstances. A succession of artists including Alan Kupperberg, John Romita Jr., and Alex Saviuk penciled the series from 1987 to 1988, and Owsley wrote the book for the first half of 1987, scripting the five-part "Gang War" story (#284–288) that DeFalco plotted. Former Spectacular Spider-Man writer Peter David scripted #289 (June 1987), which revealed Ned Leeds as being the Hobgoblin although this was retconned in 1996 by Roger Stern into Leeds not being the original Hobgoblin after all.

David Michelinie took over as writer in the next issue, for a story arc in #290–292 (July–Sept. 1987) that led to the marriage of Peter Parker and Mary Jane Watson in Amazing Spider-Man Annual No. 21. The "Kraven's Last Hunt" storyline by writer J.M. DeMatteis and artists Mike Zeck and Bob McLeod crossed over into The Amazing Spider-Man #293 and 294. Issue No.298 (Mar. 1988) was the first Spider-Man comic to be drawn by future industry star Todd McFarlane, the first regular artist on The Amazing Spider-Man since Frenz's departure. McFarlane revolutionized Spider-Man's look. His depiction – "Ditko-esque" poses, large eyes; wiry, contorted limbs; and messy, knotted, convoluted webbing – influenced the way virtually all subsequent artists would draw the character. McFarlane's other significant contribution to the Spider-Man canon was the design for what would become one of Spider-Man's most wildly popular antagonists, the supervillain Venom. Issue No. 299 (Apr. 1988) featured Venom's first appearance (a last-page cameo) before his first full appearance in #300 (May 1988). The latter issue featured Spider-Man reverting to his original red-and-blue costume.

Other notable issues of the Michelinie-McFarlane era include #312 (Feb. 1989), featuring the Green Goblin vs. the Hobgoblin; and #315–317 (May–July 1989), with the return of Venom. In July 2012, Todd McFarlane's original cover art for The Amazing Spider-Man No. 328 sold for a bid of $657,250, making it the most expensive American comic book art ever sold at auction at the time.

Michelinie–McFarlane's era included the famous The Amazing Spider-Man #328 (Jan. 1990), McFarlane's final issue on the series, which became one of the best-selling comics of the decade. The story, titled "Shaws!", featured Spider-Man temporarily imbued with cosmic powers, culminating in a battle where he defeats the Hulk with a single punch. Scholars have described this issue as a showcase of McFarlane's exaggerated anatomy and cinematic motion, bridging superhero illustration and fine art composition. McFarlane's original cover art for #328 has been recognized for its significance in the comic art world, highlighted in exhibitions exploring Marvel Comics artists' creative processes. McFarlane's visual approach has been credited with reshaping Marvel’s late-1980s aesthetic and inspiring a generation of comic artists.

=== 1990s ===
With a civilian life as a married man, the Spider-Man of the 1990s was different from the superhero of the previous three decades. McFarlane left the title in 1990 to write and draw a new series titled simply Spider-Man. His successor, Erik Larsen, penciled the book from early 1990 to mid-1991. After issue No. 350, Larsen was succeeded by Mark Bagley, who had won the 1986 Marvel Tryout Contest and was assigned a number of low-profile penciling jobs followed by a run on New Warriors in 1990. Bagley penciled the flagship Spider-Man title from 1991 to 1996. During that time, Bagley's rendition of Spider-Man was used extensively for licensed material and merchandise.

Issues #361–363 (April–June 1992) introduced Carnage, a second symbiote nemesis for Spider-Man. The series' 30th-anniversary issue, No. 365 (Aug. 1992), was a double-sized, hologram-cover issue with the cliffhanger ending of Peter Parker's parents, long thought dead, reappearing alive. It would be close to two years before they were revealed to be impostors, who are killed in No. 388 (April 1994), scripter Michelinie's last issue. His 1987–1994 stint gave him the second-longest run as writer on the title, behind Stan Lee.

Issue No. 375 was released with a gold foil cover. There was an error affecting some issues, which caused them to be missing the majority of the foil.

With No. 389, writer J. M. DeMatteis, whose Spider-Man credits included the 1987 "Kraven's Last Hunt" story arc and a 1991–1993 run on The Spectacular Spider-Man, took over the title. From October 1994 to June 1996, Amazing stopped running stories exclusive to it, and ran installments of multi-part stories that crossed over into all the Spider-Man books. One of the few self-contained stories during this period was in No. 400 (April 1995), which featured the death of Aunt May – later revealed to have been faked (although the death still stands in the MC2 continuity). The "Clone Saga" culminated with the revelation that the Spider-Man who had appeared in the previous 20 years of comics was a clone of the real Spider-Man. This plot twist was massively unpopular with many readers, and was later reversed in the "Revelations" story arc that crossed over the Spider-Man books in late 1996.

The Clone Saga tied into a publishing gap after No. 406 (Oct. 1995), when the title was temporarily replaced by The Amazing Scarlet Spider #1–2 (Nov.-Dec. 1995), featuring Ben Reilly. The series picked up again with No. 407 (Jan. 1996), with Tom DeFalco returning as writer. Bagley completed his 5½-year run by September 1996. A succession of artists, including Ron Garney, Steve Skroce, Joe Bennett, Rafael Kayanan and John Byrne penciled the book until the final issue, No. 441 (Nov. 1998), after which Marvel rebooted the title with vol. 2, No. 1 (Jan. 1999).

=== Relaunch and the 2000s ===
Marvel began The Amazing Spider-Man relaunching the 'Amazing' comic book series with (vol. 2) #1 (Jan. 1999). Howard Mackie wrote the first 29 issues. The relaunch included the Sandman being regressed to his criminal ways and the "death" of Mary Jane, which was ultimately reversed. Other elements included the introduction of a new Spider-Woman (who was spun off into her own short-lived series) and references to John Byrne's miniseries Spider-Man: Chapter One, which was launched at the same time as the reboot. Byrne also penciled issues #1–18 (from 1999 to 2000) and wrote #13–14, John Romita Jr. took his place soon after in October 2000. Mackie's run ended with The Amazing Spider-Man Annual 2001, which saw the return of Mary Jane, who then left Parker upon reuniting with him.

With issue No. 30 (June 2001), J. Michael Straczynski took over as writer and oversaw additional storylines – most notably his lengthy "Spider-Totem" arc, which raised the issue of whether Spider-Man's powers were magic-based, rather than as the result of a radioactive spider's bite. Additionally, Straczynski resurrected the plot point of Aunt May discovering her nephew was Spider-Man, and returned Mary Jane, with the couple reuniting in The Amazing Spider-Man (vol. 2) #50. Straczynski gave Spider-Man a new profession, having Parker teach at his former high school.

Issue No. 30 began a dual numbering system, with the original series numbering (#471) returned and placed alongside the volume two number on the cover. Other longtime, rebooted Marvel Comics titles, including Fantastic Four, likewise were given the dual numbering around this time. After (vol. 2) #58 (Nov. 2003), the title reverted completely to its original numbering for issue No. 500 (Dec. 2003). Mike Deodato Jr. penciled the series from mid-2004 until 2006.

That year Peter Parker revealed his Spider-Man identity on live television in the company-crossover storyline "Civil War", in which the superhero community is split over whether to conform to the federal government's new Superhuman Registration Act. This knowledge was erased from the world with the event of the four-part, crossover story arc, "One More Day", written partially by J. Michael Straczynski and illustrated by Joe Quesada, running through The Amazing Spider-Man #544–545 (Nov.-Dec. 2007), Friendly Neighborhood Spider-Man No. 24 (Nov. 2007) and The Sensational Spider-Man No. 41 (Dec. 2007), the final issues of those two titles. Here, the demon Mephisto makes a Faustian bargain with Parker and Mary Jane, offering to save Parker's dying Aunt May if the couple will allow their marriage to have never existed, rewriting that portion of their pasts. This story arc marked the end of Straczynski's work on the title.

Following this, Marvel made The Amazing Spider-Man the company's sole Spider-Man title, increasing its frequency of publication to three issues monthly, and inaugurating the series with a sequence of "back to basics" story arcs under the banner of "Brand New Day". Parker now exists in a changed world where he and Mary Jane had never married, and Parker has no memory of being married to her, with domino effect differences in their immediate world. The most notable of these revisions to Spider-Man continuity are the return of Harry Osborn, whose death in The Spectacular Spider-Man No. 200 (May 1993) is erased; and the reestablishment of Spider-Man's secret identity, with no one except Mary Jane able to recall that Parker is Spider-Man (although he soon reveals his secret identity to the New Avengers and the Fantastic Four). Under the banner of Brand New Day, Marvel tried to only use newly created villains instead of relying on older ones. Characters like Mister Negative and Overdrive both in Free Comic Book Day 2007 Spider-Man (July 2007), Menace in No. 549 (March 2008), Ana and Sasha Kravinoff in No. 565 (September 2008) and No. 567 (October 2008) respectively, and several more were introduced. The alternating regular writers were initially Dan Slott, Bob Gale, Marc Guggenheim, and Zeb Wells, joined by a rotation of artists that included Steve McNiven, Salvador Larroca, Phil Jimenez, Barry Kitson, Chris Bachalo, Mike McKone, Marcos Martín, and John Romita Jr. Joe Kelly, Mark Waid, Fred Van Lente and Roger Stern later joined the writing team and Paolo Rivera, Lee Weeks and Marco Checchetto the artist roster. Waid's work on the series included a meeting between Spider-Man and Stephen Colbert in The Amazing Spider-Man No. 573 (Dec. 2008). Issue No. 583 (March 2009) included a back-up story in which Spider-Man meets President Barack Obama.

=== 2010s and temporary end of publication ===
Mark Waid scripted the opening of "The Gauntlet" storyline in issue No. 612 (Jan. 2010). The Gauntlet story was concluded by Grim Hunt (No. 634–637) which saw the resurrection of long-dead Spider-Man villain, Kraven the Hunter. The series became a twice-monthly title with Dan Slott as sole writer at issue No. 648 (Jan. 2011), launching the Big Time storyline. Eight additional pages were added per issue. Big Time saw major changes in Spider-Man/Peter Parker's life, Peter would start working at Horizon Labs and begin a relationship with Carlie Cooper (his first serious relationship since his marriage to Mary Jane), Mac Gargan returned as Scorpion after spending the past few years as Venom, Phil Urich would take up the mantle of Hobgoblin, and the death of J. Jonah Jameson's wife, Marla Jameson. Issues 654 and 654.1 saw the birth of Agent Venom, Flash Thompson bonded with the Venom symbiote, which would lead to Venom getting his own series Venom (volume 2). Starting in No. 659 and going to No. 665, the series built-up to the Spider-Island event which officially started in No. 666 and ended in No. 673. Ends of the Earth was the next event that ran from No. 682 through No. 687. This publishing format lasted until issue No. 700, which concluded the "Dying Wish" storyline, in which Parker and Doctor Octopus swapped bodies, and the latter taking on the mantle of Spider-Man when Parker apparently died in Doctor Octopus' body. The Amazing Spider-Man ended with this issue, with the story continuing in the new series The Superior Spider-Man. Despite The Superior Spider-Man being considered a different series to The Amazing Spider-Man, the first 33 issue run goes towards the legacy numbering of The Amazing Spider-Man acting as issues 701–733. In December 2013, the series returned for five issues, numbered 700.1 through 700.5, with the first two written by David Morrell and drawn by Klaus Janson.

=== 2014 relaunch ===
In January 2014, Marvel confirmed that The Amazing Spider-Man would be relaunched on April 30, 2014, starting from issue No. 1, with Peter Parker as Spider-Man once again. The first issue of this new version of The Amazing Spider-Man was, according to Diamond Comics Distributors, the "best-selling comic book... in over a decade." Issues #1–6 were a story arc called "Lucky to be Alive", taking place immediately after "Goblin Nation", with issues No. 4 and No. 5 being a crossover with the Original Sin storyline. Issue No. 4 introduced Silk, a new heroine who was bitten by the same spider as Peter Parker. Issues #7–8 featured a team-up between Ms. Marvel and Spider-Man, and had backup stories that tied into "Edge of Spider-Verse". The next major plot arc, titled "Spider-Verse", began in Issue No. 9 and ended in No. 15, features every Spider-Man from across the dimensions being hunted by Morlun, and a team-up to stop him, with Peter Parker of Earth-616 in command of the Spider-Men's Alliance. The Amazing Spider-Man Annual No. 1 of the relaunched series was released in December 2014, featuring stories unrelated to "Spider-Verse".

=== The Amazing Spider-Man: Renew Your Vows ===
In 2015, Marvel started the universe wide Secret Wars event where the core and several other Marvel universes were combined into one big planet called Battleworld. Battleworld was divided into sections with most of them being self-contained universes. Marvel announced that several of these self-contained universes would get their own tie in series and one of them was Amazing Spider-Man: Renew Your Vows, an alternate universe where Peter Parker and Mary Jane are still married and give birth to their child Annie May Parker, written by Dan Slott. Despite the series being considered separate from the main Amazing Spider-Man series, the original 5 issue run is counted towards its legacy numbering acting as No. 752-756.

=== 2015 relaunch ===
Following the 2015 Secret Wars event, a number of Spider-Man-related titles were either relaunched or created as part of the "All-New, All-Different Marvel" event. Among them, The Amazing Spider-Man was relaunched as well and primarily focused on Peter Parker continuing to run Parker Industries and becoming a successful businessman operating worldwide. It also tied with Civil War II (involving an Inhuman named Ulysses Cain who can predict possible futures), Dead No More (where Ben Reilly [the original Scarlet Spider] revealed to be revived and as one of the antagonists instead), and Secret Empire (during Hydra's reign led by a Hydra influenced Captain America/Steve Rogers, and the dismissal of Parker Industries by Peter Parker to stop Otto Octavius). Starting in September 2017, Marvel started the Marvel Legacy event which renumbered several Marvel series to their original numbering. The Amazing Spider-Man was put back to its original numbering for #789. Issues #789 through 791 focused on the aftermath of Peter destroying Parker Industries and his fall from grace. Issues #792 and 793 were part of the Venom Inc. story. Threat Level: Red was the story for the next three issues which saw Norman Osborn obtain and bond with the Carnage symbiote. Go Down Swinging saw the results of the combination of Osborn's goblin serum and Carnage symbiote creating the Red Goblin. Issue No. 801 was Dan Slott's goodbye issue.

=== 2018 relaunch ===
In March 2018, it was announced that writer Nick Spencer would be writing the main semi-monthly The Amazing Spider-Man series beginning with a new No. 1, replacing long-time writer Dan Slott, as part of the Fresh Start relaunch that July. The first five-issue story arc was titled 'Back to Basics.' During the Back to Basics story, Kindred, a mysterious villain with some relation to Peter's past, was introduced, and Peter resumed his romantic relationship with Mary Jane once more. The first major story under Spencer was Hunted which ran through issues 16 through 23, the story also included four ".HU" issues for issues 16, 18, 19, and 20. The end of the story saw the death of long-running Spider-Man villain Kraven the Hunter, being replaced by his clone son, the Last Son of Kraven.

=== 2020s ===
Issue 45 kicked off the Sins Rising story which saw the resurrected Sin-Eater carry out the plans of Kindred to cleanse the world of sin, particularly that of Norman Osborn. The story concluded with issue 49, issue 850 in legacy numbering, seeing Spider-Man and Green Goblin team up to defeat Sin-Eater. Last Remains started in issue 50 and concluded in issue 55, the story saw Kindred's plans come to fruition as he tormented Spider-Man. The story has also seen five ".LR" for issues 50, 51, 52, 53, and 54 which focused on The Order of the Web, a new faction of Spider-People consisting of Julia Carpenter (Madame Web), Miles Morales (Spider-Man), Gwen Stacy (Ghost-Spider), Cindy Moon (Silk), Jessica Drew (Spider-Woman), and Anya Corazon (Spider-Girl) . The story also revealed that Kindred is Harry Osborn. Last Remains also received two fallout issues called Last Remains Post-Mortem.

Nick Spencer concluded his run with the Sinister War story which wrapped up in No. 74 (legacy numbering 875). The story saw several retcons to the Spider-Man mythos including that Kindred was Gabriel and Sarah Stacy all along, the fact that the Stacy twins were actually genetically engineered beings using Norman Osborn and Gwen Stacy's DNA, that the Harry Osborn that returned in Brand New Day was actually a clone, and that Norman had made a deal with Mephisto and sold Harry's soul to the demon. The story ended with the deaths of the Harry clone, Gabriel, and Sarah and the real Harry's soul being freed from Mephisto's grasp.

After Spencer left the book, Marvel announced the "Beyond" era of Spider-Man would start in #75. The book would be moving back to the format it had during Brand New Day where it would have a rotating cast of writers including Kelly Thompson, Saladin Ahmed, Cody Ziglar, Patrick Gleason, and Zeb Wells. The book would also be released three times a month. "Beyond" would focus on Ben Reilly taking up the mantle of Spider-Man once again but backed by the Beyond Corporation. Peter also falls ill and cannot be Spider-Man so he gives Ben his blessing to carry on as the main Spider-Man. However, following the conclusion of the storyline in #93, Peter has resumed active duties as Spider-Man, while Ben suffers a mental breakdown after losing his memories and becomes the villain Chasm.

=== 2022 relaunch ===
In January 2022, it was announced that writer Zeb Wells and John Romita Jr. would be working on a relaunched The Amazing Spider-Man, bringing the number of volumes for the title to its sixth, with the series beginning in April 2022 as a semi-monthly publication. The relaunch encompasses both a legacy numbering of #900 as well as the 60th anniversary for the character. The relaunch took place months after a mysterious event that left Peter on bad terms with the superhero community and ended his relationship with Mary Jane. He ends up taking a job at Oscorp and begins working closely with Norman Osborn (who becomes the heroic Gold Goblin) and starts dating Black Cat. The volume's first crossover event was entitled Dark Web, with Chasm having teamed up with Madelyne Pryor to bring limbo to Earth.

It's later revealed that Benjamin Rabin, the emissary of the Mayan god of mischief Wayeb', sent Peter and Mary Jane to an alternate dimension to conduct a ceremony that would allow Wayeb to control the Earth. Peter was sent back to his Earth, while due to the alternative passage of time, Mary Jane and Benjamin Rabin's son Paul spent four years in the realm together and adopted two children. When Peter eventually rescued them, Mary Jane refused to part with her new family. Rabin then planned to sacrifice Mary Jane to resurrect Wayeb, but is ultimately stopped by Ms. Marvel sacrificing herself, but not before Rabin reveals that Paul and Mary Jane's children were illusions created by him and ceased their existence. Mary Jane becomes the superheroine Jackpot using the bracelet acquired from the other dimension as Black Cat breaks up with Peter shortly before Janice Lincoln and Randy Robertson's wedding.

The second crossover event was entitled Gang War, where Peter led a team of street-level superheroes to stop a massive war between New York's gangs led by Madame Masque, Tombstone, and Beetle. During an encounter with Kraven the Hunter, Peter temporarily becomes infected by Norman Osborn's sins and becomes the villainous Spider-Goblin. Eventually, Norman's sins return to him and he resumes being the Green Goblin. While fighting Spider-Man, the goblin reveals that he implanted a trigger phrase within Peter's mind that would bring forth the Spider-Goblin persona. Norman then sends Spider-Goblin to attack the Sinister Six, who he brutally defeats, but is stopped from killing them due to the intervention of Chasm. With help from the Living Brain and his allies, Peter is able to purge himself and Norman of the Goblin for good. Wells' run ended in June 2024 with a climactic showdown between Spider-Man and Tombstone, where the former stops the latter from killing his daughter to establish his dominance over New York's gangs. Peter also begins to date Shay Marken, a nurse at the Ravencroft Institute.

In July 2024, it was announced that following the conclusion of Wells' run, a 10-issue event would begin publication in the Fall called Eight Deaths of Spider-Man. The series was written by Joe Kelly and Justina Ireland and illustrated by Ed McGuinness and Gleb Melnikov. The event featured the recently crowned Sorcerer Supreme Doctor Doom designating Spider-Man as Earth's champion to take on Doctor Strange's annual task of facing the Scions of Cyttorak, giving him an arcane armor and eight reeds to resurrect him if he dies. After being killed several times and being forced to face Cyra's challenge of enduring the future deaths of his loved ones and millions of others, Peter became disillusioned and gave up until his inactivity nearly costs the lives of Aunt May and his friends. He uses his remaining reeds to resurrect them before teaming up with Juggernaut and the X-Men to take on Callix, who had been infected by the Blight and killed his siblings. After Callix kills him, Cyra, inspired by Peter's indomitable will, sacrifices her immortality to resurrect him and briefly imbue him with Juggernaut's strength. Cyttorak, seeing Peter willing to risk his life in the face of tragedy, decides to shield his remaining children from the Blight, saving the planet.

=== 2025 relaunch ===
In December 2024, it was announced that Kelly would become the writer of a new volume of ASM that would launch after Eight Deaths of Spider-Man in April 2025, with John Romita Jr. and Pepe Larraz providing the work on the art.

Peter manages to secure a job as an engineer at Rand Enterprises with help from his childhood friend, Brian Nehring. After he and his coworkers uncover a plot by Hobgoblin and Itsy Bitsy that involved distributing drugs that heighten anxiety and stress, Peter's life seems stable until a powerful new villain named Hellgate attacks Peter and sends him into space. Peter gains a "technarachnid" suit and allies with Rocket Raccoon, alien warrior Raeleth the Wretched, extraterrestrial scientist Xanto Starblood, and the symbiote Symbie. Peter embarks on cosmic adventures protecting the innocent while also aiming to make himself stronger to help him defeat Hellgate. On Earth, Ben Reilly takes over Peter's life, while Norman Osborn fills in as a more ruthless Spider-Man.

== Contributors ==
=== Vol. 1 (1963–1998, 2003–2014, 2017–2018) ===
==== Writers ====
Years	Writer	Issues
1963–1972, 1973, 1980, 1984	Stan Lee	#1-100, #105-110, #116-118, #200 (epilogue), Annual #1-5, #18
1971–1972	Roy Thomas	#101-104
1972–1975	Gerry Conway	#111-149, Giant-Size Super-Heroes #1
1975–1978	Archie Goodwin	#150, #181, Annual #11
1975–1978	Len Wein	#151-181, Annual #10
1976–1978, 1981, 1983	Bill Mantlo	#181, #222, Annual #10-11, #17
1978–1980	Marv Wolfman	#182-204, Annual #13
1978	Jim Starlin	#187
1980, 1987–1994	David Michelinie	#205, #290-292, #296-352, #359-375, #377-388, Annual #21
1980, 1982–1984, 2009–2010	Roger Stern	#206, #224-227, #229-252, #580, #627-629, Annual #16-17
1980–1982	Dennis O’Neil	#207-219, #221, #223, Annual #14-15
1980	Jim Shooter	#208
1980	Mark Gruenwald	#208
1981	Michael Fleisher	#220
1981, 1987, 1994–1995	J. M. DeMatteis	#223, #293-294, #389-406
1982	Jan Strnad	#228
1984–1987, 1992–1993, 1996–1998	Tom DeFalco	#251-261, #263, #265, #268-285, #365, #375, #407-439, #-1
1985	Bob Layton	#262
1985	Craig Anderson	#264
1985–1987	Peter David	#266-267, #278, #289
1985	Louise Simonson	Annual #19
1986	Jo Duffy	#278
1987	Jim Owsley	#284-288
1987	Ann Nocenti	#295
1987	Jim Shooter	Annual #21
1991–1993	Al Milgrom	#353-358, #371-372
1993	Steven Grant	#376-377
1995	Todd Dezago	#404-405
1998	John Byrne	#440-441
1998–2003	J. Michael Straczynski	#442-499 (vol. 2 #1-58)
2003–2007	J. Michael Straczynski	#500-545
2008–2013, 2017–2018	Dan Slott	#546–548, #559–561, #564, #568–573, #581–582, #590–591, #600, #618–621, #647–660, #662–676, #678–700, #789-801; #679.1, #699.1
2008–2010	Marc Guggenheim	#549-551, #564-567, #574, #584-588, #608-610, #647
2008	Bob Gale	#552-554, #558, #562-564, #647
2008–2010	Zeb Wells	#555-557, #577, #583, #630-633, #636, #647
2008–2010	Joe Kelly	#575-577, #595-599, #606-607, #611-612, #617, #625, #634-637
2009–2012	Mark Waid	#578-579, #583, #592-594, #601, #612-614, #623-624, #642-646, #647, #677
2009–2011	Fred Van Lente	#589, #602-605, #615-616, #622, #626, #647, #654, #659-660
2010	Tom Peyer	#623-624
2010	Joe Quesada	#638-641
2011–2013, 2017–2018	Christos Gage	#661-662, #664, #695-697, #790, #794-795
2012	Christopher Yost	#679.1, #680-681
2013	Joe Keatinge	#699.1
2014	David Morrell	#700.1-700.2
2014	Joe Casey	#700.3-700.4
2014	Brian Reed	#700.5

==== Pencilers ====
Years	Penciler	Issues
1963–1966	Steve Ditko	#1–38, Annual #1-2
1966–1974, 1992, 2003	John Romita Sr.	#39-75, #82-88, #93–95, #106–119, #132, #365, #500, Annual #3-4
1968	Larry Lieber	Annual #5
1968	Don Heck	#57, #59-63, #66
1969–1970, 1980	Jim Mooney	#68-69, #71, #80, #84-87, #207
1969–1970	John Buscema	#72-73, #76-81, #84-85
1970–1973, 1975–1976	Gil Kane	#89-92, #96–105, #120–124, #150, Annual #10
1973–1978	Ross Andru	#125–131, #133–149, #151–153, #156–180, #182–185
1976–1979, 1985–1986	Sal Buscema	#154-155, #181, #198-199, #266, #272
1978–1981	Keith Pollard	#186, #188, #191-195, #197, #200-205
1978	Jim Starlin	#187
1979–1980	John Byrne	#189-190, #206, Annual #13
1979	Al Milgrom	#196
1980–1984, 1987, 1998, 2003–2004, 2008–2009	John Romita Jr.	#208, #210-218, #223–227, #229–236, #238–250, #290-291, #432, #500-508, #568-573, #584–585, #587-588, #600, Annual #16
1980	Alan Weiss	#209
1980–1981	Frank Miller	Annual #14-15
1981	Luke McDonnell	#219
1981, 1985	Bob McLeod	#220, #267
1981, 1987	Alan Kupperberg	#221, #285-286, #288-289
1981–1983	Bob Hall	#222, #237
1982–1986	Rick Leonardi	#228, #253-254, #279, #282
1983	Ed Hannigan	Annual #17
1984–1986, 1996	Ron Frenz	#248, #251-252, #255–261, #263, #265, #268-277, #280-281, #283-284, Annual #18, Annual ‘96
1985	Bob Layton	#262
1985	Paty Cockrum	#264
1985	Mary Wilshire	Annual #19
1986	Tom Morgan	#274, #289
1986	James Fry	#274
1986	Mike Harris	#278
1986–1987	Brett Breeding	#280, #284
1986	Mark Beachum	Annual #20
1987, 1989-1991	Erik Larsen	#287, #324, #327, #329-344, #346-350
1987-1988	Alex Saviuk	#292, #296-297
1987	Mike Zeck	#293-294
1987	Cindy Martin	#295
1988-1990	Todd McFarlane	#298-323, #325, #328
1991-1996	Mark Bagley	#345, #351-358, #361-365, #368–375, #378–404, #407–415
1992	Chris Marrinan	#359-360
1992	Jerry Bingham	#366-367
1992	Scott McDaniel	Annual #26
1993	Jeff Johnson	#376-377
1995	Darick Robertson	#405
1995	Angel Medina	#406
1996, 2006-2007	Ron Garney	#416-417, #529, #532-543
1996-1997	Steve Skroce	#418-421, #425-428
1997–1998	Joe Bennett	#422-424, #429-431, #434-436, #-1
1997–1998	Tom Lyle	#433, Annual ‘97-‘98
1998	Rafael Kayanan	#437, #439-441
1998	Scott Kolins	#438
2004–2006	Mike Deodato	#509-528
2006	Tyler Kirkham	#530-531
2007, 2010	Joe Quesada	#544-545, #638-641
2008	Steve McNiven	#546-548
2008	Salvador Larroca	#549-551
2008–2009	Phil Jimenez	#552-554, #565-567, #595
2008–2010	Chris Bachalo	#555-557, #575-576, #630-633
2008–2009	Barry Kitson	#558, #574, #577, #583, #586, #590-591, #594, #602, #604
2008–2011, 2018	Marcos Martin	#559-561, #578-579, #618-620, #655-657, #800-801
2008–2009, 2011	Mike McKone	#562-563, #581-582, #592-594, #606-607, #660
2008–2009	Paulo Siqueira	#564, #589, #596, #598-599
2008	Mark Pennington	#566
2008	Andy Lanning	#567
2009–2010	Paolo Rivera	#577, #638-641
2009–2010	Lee Weeks	#580, #627-629
2009	Klaus Janson	#582
2009–2010, 2013	Marco Checchetto	#597-599, #608-610, #636-637, #699.1
2009	Stephen Segovia	#599
2009	Mario Alberti	#601
2009	Robert Atkins	#603
2009–2011	Javier Pulido	#605, #615-617, #620, #658, #661
2009	Adriana Melo	#607
2009–2010	Luke Ross	#608-610
2010	Eric Canete	#611
2010	Paul Azaceta	#612-614, #623-624, #642-646
2010	Ken Niimura	#612
2010	Max Fiumara	#617, #625, #647
2010	Michael Lark	#621, #634-637
2010	Joe Quinones	#622
2010	Javier Rodriguez	#624
2010	Michael Gaydos	#626
2010, 2012	Emma Rios	#631-633, #677
2011–2013, 2018	Humberto Ramos	#648-651, #654.1, #667–672, #676, #678–679, #684–685, #692–694, #699–700, #800
2011–2012	Stefano Caselli	#652-654, #657, #659-660, #666, #673, #682-683, #686-687
2011	Ty Templeton	#657
2011	Nuno Plati	#657
2011	Reilly Brown	#661-662
2011–2013, 2018	Giuseppe Camuncoli	#663-665, #674-675, #680-681, #688-691, #695-697, #700, #800
2011, 2018	Ryan Stegman	#665, #792-793
2012	Matthew Clark	#679.1
2013	Richard Elson	#698
2013	Valentine De Landro	#699.1
2014	Klaus Janson	#700.1-700.2
2014	Timothy Green	#700.3-700.4
2014	Sean Chen	#700.5
2017–2018	Stuart Immonen	#789–791, #794, #797–800
2018	Mike Hawthorne	#795-796, #800
2018	Nick Bradshaw	#800

=== Vol. 2 (1999–2003) ===
==== Writers ====
Years	Writer	Issues
1999–2001	Howard Mackie	(vol. 2) #1-13, #15-29
2000	John Byrne	#13-14
2001–2003	J. Michael Straczynski	#30-58

==== Pencilers ====
Years	Penciler	Issues
1999–2000	John Byrne	(vol. 2) #1-18
2000	Erik Larsen	(vol. 2) #19-21
2000–2003	John Romita Jr.	(vol. 2) #22-27, #30-58
2001	Joe Bennett	(vol. 2) #28
2001	Lee Weeks	(vol. 2) #29

=== Vol. 3 (2014–2015) ===
==== Writers ====
Years	Writer	Issues
2014–2015	Dan Slott	#1-18
2015	Gerry Conway	#16.1-20.1

==== Pencilers ====
Years	Penciler	Issues
2014–2015	Humberto Ramos	(vol. 3) #1-6, #8, #16-18
2014–2015	Giuseppe Camuncoli	(vol. 3) #1, #7-9, #12–15
2015	Olivier Coipel	(vol. 3) #9-11
2015	Carlo Barberi	#16.1-20.1

=== Vol. 4 (2015–2017) ===
==== Writers ====
Years	Writer	Issues
2015–2017	Dan Slott	#1-32

==== Pencilers ====
Years	Penciler	Issues
2015–2017	Giuseppe Camuncoli	#1–5, #9–16, #19–24
2016	Matteo Buffagni	#6-8
2016	R.B. Silva	#17-18
2017	Stuart Immonen	#25-31
2017	Greg Smallwood	#32

=== Vol. 5 (2018–2022) ===
==== Writers ====
Years	Writer	Issues
2018–2021	Nick Spencer	#1-74; #18.HU-20.HU; #50.LR-54.LR
2020–2021	Matthew Rosenberg	#50.LR-54.LR
2021	Ed Brisson	#68-69
2021	Christos Gage	#74
2021–2022	Zeb Wells	#75-76, #86, #93; #92.BEY
2021–2022	Kelly Thompson	#77-78, #91-92
2022	Jed MacKay	#87-88, #92; #78.BEY, #92.BEY
2022	Cody Ziglar	#79-80, #84-85; #80.BEY, #92.BEY
2022	Saladin Ahmed	#81-82
2022	Patrick Gleason	#83, #89-90
2022	Geoffrey Thorne	#88.BEY

==== Pencilers ====
Years	Penciler	Issues
2018–2020	Ryan Ottley	#1-5, #11-13, #16, #23-25, #30-31, #37, #41-43, #49
2018–2021	Humberto Ramos	#6-10, #17-18, #20, #22, #25, #49, #74
2018	Steve Lieber	#6-7
2019	Michele Bandini	#9-10
2019	Chris Bachalo	#14-15
2019	Alberto Jimenez Alburquerque	#16
2019	Gerardo Sandoval	#19, #21
2019–2022	Patrick Gleason	#25, #32-34, #50-52, #55, #61-62, #75-76, #83, #93
2019	Kev Walker	#25-28
2019	Francesco Manna	#29
2020, 2022	Jan Bazaldua	#35-36, #88.BEY
2020	Iban Coello	#38-40
2020	José Carlos Silva	#40
2020	Kim Jacinto	#44
2020, 2022	Bruno Oliveira	#44; #92.BEY
2020–2022	Mark Bagley	#45, #48–49, #53–54, #56–57, #60, #64, #66–69, #74, #89-90, #93; #92.BEY
2020–2021	Marcelo Ferreira	#46-47, #58-59, #67-69, #72-74
2021	Federico Vicentini	#63-65, #70-72
2021	Federico Sabbatini	#65, #71
2021–2022	Carlos Gómez	#67-69, #72-74, #81, #87; #80.BEY
2021	Ze Carlos	#68-69, #72-74
2021	Travel Foreman	#75
2021–2022	Sara Pichelli	#77-78, #91-93
2021–2022	Jim Towe	#78, #88.BEY
2022	Elenora Carlini	#78.BEY
2022	Michael Dowling	#79-80, #86, #88
2022	Jorge Fornes	#82
2022	Paco Medina	#84-85; #80.BEY
2022	Ivan Fiorelli	#80.BEY
2022	Fran Galán	#91-92; #92.BEY
2022	José Carlos Silva	#92
2022	Luigi Zagaria	#92.BEY

=== Vol. 6 (2022–2025) ===
==== Writers ====
Years	Writer	Issues
2022–present	Zeb Wells	#1-18, #21-60
2022–2023	Dan Slott	#6, #31
2022	Daniel Kibblesmith	#6
2022	Jeff Loveness	#6
2023–2025	Joe Kelly	#19-20, #61-62, #65, #69-70
2023	Celeste Bronfman	#31
2023	Cale Atkinson	#31
2023	Albert Monteys	#31
2023	Steve Foxe	#31
2024-2025	Justina Ireland	#63-64, #66-68
2025	Derek Landy	#65.DEATHS
2025	Christos Gage	#68.DEATHS

==== Pencilers ====
Years	Penciler	Issues
2022–2024	John Romita Jr.	#1-5, #7-8, #11-13, #21-26, #31, #39-44, #49, #55-60
2022–2025	Ed McGuinness	#6, #15-18, #27-30, #37-38, #50-54, #60-62, #69-70
2022–2023	Patrick Gleason	#9, #32-36, #60
2022	Nick Dragotta	#10
2023	Michael Dowling	#14
2023	Kyle Hotz	#14
2023	Terry Dodson	#14, #19-20
2023	Ryan Stegman	#14
2023	Ze Carlos	#31
2023	Emilio Laiso	#31, #55
2024	Carmen Carnero	#45-46
2024	Todd Nauck	#47-48, #51-54
2024	Gleb Melnikov	#63-64
2025	CAFU	#65
2025	Kev Walker	#65.DEATHS
2025	Andrea Broccardo	#66-68
2025	Mark Buckingham	#68.DEATHS

== Collected editions ==
See: Spider-Man Collected Editions
