= Scarlet Spider (comic book) =

Comic book series by Marvel Comics

- Cover of Scarlet Spider #1 (November 1995); Art by John Romita, Jr. & Al Williamson

Publication information
- Publisher: Marvel Comics
- Schedule: Monthly
- Format: (vol. 1): Limited series (vol. 2): Ongoing series (vol. 3): Ongoing series
- Publication date: List: (vol. 1): November – December 1995 (vol. 2): January 2012 – December 2013
- No. of issues: (vol. 1): 2 (vol. 2): 26 (25 regular + 1 special)
- Main character(s): (vol. 1, vol. 3): Ben Reilly (vol. 2): Kaine Parker

Creative team
- Written by: List: (vol. 1) Howard Mackie Todd DeZago (vol. 2) Christopher Yost (vol. 3) Peter David
- Penciller: List: (vol. 1) Gil Kane John Romita Jr. (vol. 2) Ryan Stegman Khoi Pham Reilly Brown Paulo Siqueira Neil Edwards Carlo Barberi Chris Burnham
- Inker: List: (vol. 1) Tom Palmer Al Williamson (vol. 2) Michael Babinski Terry Pallott; David Baldeon
- Colorist: List: (vol. 2) Edgar Delgado Chris Sotomayor

Scarlet Spider is the title of three comic book series published by Marvel Comics about two clones of Spider-Man while they functioned as the then-current version of the Scarlet Spider. The first volume, about Ben Reilly, lasted only two issues as a brief temporary replacement of the Spider-Man series and was published in 1995. The second volume, about Kaine Parker, started publishing in January 2012 and ended in December 2013 with issue 25 after a total of 26 issues, because there was a special Marvel Point One issue published between issues 12 and 13. The third volume, again about Reilly, started publishing in April 2017 and ended in October 2018 with issue 25.

== Volume 1 ==
The first volume starred Ben Reilly as the Scarlet Spider. It was published for two issues in November and December 1995 in between Spider-Man issues 63 and 64. During this time, the four primary Spider-Man series and his quarterly series and were paused and briefly replaced by Scarlet Spider counterparts; the others being Web of Scarlet Spider, The Amazing Scarlet Spider, The Spectacular Scarlet Spider, and Scarlet Spider Unlimited.

The five series were instituted as part of the Clone Saga after when Peter Parker gave up being Spider-Man to retire with his pregnant wife Mary Jane, and the Scarlet Spider took on his duties. Spider-Man (along with Amazing, Spectacular and Unlimited) returned to its old name and numbering when Ben Reilly left the Scarlet Spider identity behind and took on the Spider-Man name for himself.

The Scarlet Spider books were direct continuations, in terms of creative teams and story lines, of their Spider-Man counterparts. They were effectively temporary renamings of their counterparts, other than not being incorporated into their issue numbering. The writers of the two issues were Howard Mackie (plot) and Todd DeZago (script), and the pencillers were Gil Kane and John Romita Jr.

== Volume 2 ==
Variant cover of Scarlet Spider, vol. 2, #1 (March 2012). Art by Mark Bagley.

On July 22, 2011, during San Diego Comic-Con, Marvel released an image to the audience depicting a burnt sweater of the original Scarlet Spider. This led many readers to assume that Ben Reilly would be returning and taking on the mantle of Scarlet Spider once again. However, through introduction of the Marvel Now event, Marvel Point One showed readers that Kaine Parker would be the main character in the new Scarlet Spider series.

Ryan Stegman, the series' penciller states that volume 2 is set to be of a darker tone than The Amazing Spider-Man series. Stegman also states that the new Scarlet Spider is meant to be a grittier and scarier version of the original Spider-Man. The writer of the series, Christopher Yost, states that Kaine would be moved to Houston, Texas due to characters in New York knowing that he was a villain in his former life, and that Kaine needed a fresh start. Yost also states that due to the brand new location of Houston in a Spider-Man comic book, several new villains would be introduced in the Marvel world as well as a brand new supporting cast. Yost stated that the Scarlet Spider series would be a story about a former super-villain who is finding himself and is on the pursuit of a journey of self-discovery.

The second volume stars Peter Parker's first genetic clone, Kaine as the Scarlet Spider. After helping to stop Spider-Island, Kaine has been cured of his clonal degeneration. While fleeing to Mexico he stops in Houston to steal money from criminals, but ends up becoming the superhero, Scarlet Spider.

The first issue sold over 50,000 copies, but sales dropped to an average of about 22,000 copies being sold per issue by July 2013. The series introduces several new characters in the Marvel world, such as Aracely Penalba (the demigod superhero known as Hummingbird), Dr. Donald Meland and his husband Wally Layton. The character Annabelle Adams is also introduced in the Marvel world as a love interest for Kaine. The characters play pivotal roles in the growth of Kaine as a superhero.

On July 6, 2012 Marvel teased readers with the submission of an article displaying a logo titled Minimum Carnage, and that more information would be released soon. The 2012 San Diego Comic-Con revealed that the Scarlet Spider series along with the Venom series, would be collaborating for the Marvel event, Minimum Carnage.

On May 10, 2013, Christopher Yost revealed his plans of Scarlet Spider and the Superior Spider-Man meeting for the first time in Superior Spider-Man Team-Up issue #2, in a Marvel arc titled 'Sibling Rivalry'. Scarlet Spider's and Superior Spider-Man's meeting is said to collaborate with the Scarlet Spider and Superior Spider-Man Team Up series'.

== Volume 3 ==
Following the events of the 2016 Spider-Man event "The Clone Conspiracy", Ben Reilly was brought back after a twenty year absence, and a new Scarlet Spider title written by Peter David was launched. The title – Ben Reilly: The Scarlet Spider – ran for 25 issues before folding in late 2018.

== Collected editions ==
Title	Material Collected	ISBN	Release
Vol. 1 (Ben Reilly)
Spider-Man: The Complete Ben Reilly Epic Book 1	Spider-Man: The Parker Years, New Warriors (1990) #65-66, Scarlet Spider Unlimited #1, Web Of Scarlet Spider #1–2, Amazing Scarlet Spider #1–2, Scarlet Spider Vol. 1, #1–2, Spectacular Scarlet Spider #1–2, Green Goblin #3 and Sensational Spider-Man (1996) #0 and Mini-Comic.	978-0-7851-5545-4	August 2011
Vol. 2 (Kaine Parker)
Scarlet Spider Vol. 1: Life After Death	Scarlet Spider Vol. 2 #1–6, material from Marvel Point One	978-0-7851-6310-7	February 2013
Scarlet Spider Vol. 2: Lone Star	Scarlet Spider Vol. 2 #7–9, #12.1, #13–15	978-0-7851-6311-4	April 2013
Carnage: Minimum Carnage	Scarlet Spider Vol. 2 #10–12	978-0-7851-6726-6	January 2013
Scarlet Spider Vol. 3: The Big Leagues	Scarlet Spider Vol. 2 #16–20, Superior Spider-Man Team-Up #2	978-0-7851-6649-8	November 2013
Scarlet Spider Vol. 4: Into the Grave	Scarlet Spider Vol. 2 #21–25	978-0-7851-6650-4	February 2014
Vol. 3 (Ben Reilly: The Scarlet Spider)
Ben Reilly: The Scarlet Spider Vol. 1: Back in the Hood	Ben Reilly: Scarlet Spider #1–5 and material from Clone Conspiracy Omega #1	978-0-7851-9458-3	October 2017
Ben Reilly: The Scarlet Spider Vol. 2: Death's Sting	Ben Reilly: Scarlet Spider #6–10, Slingers (1998) #0	978-0-7851-9459-0	January 2018
Ben Reilly: The Scarlet Spider Vol. 3: Slingers Return	Ben Reilly: Scarlet Spider #10–14	978-1-3029-1115-7	May 2018
Ben Reilly: The Scarlet Spider Vol. 4: Damnation	Ben Reilly: Scarlet Spider #15–19	978-1-3029-1116-4	October 2018
Ben Reilly: The Scarlet Spider Vol. 5: Deal With the Devil	Ben Reilly: Scarlet Spider #20–25	978-1-3029-1504-9	January 2019
