= The Amazing Scarlet Spider =

Comic book series

- The Amazing Scarlet Spider #1, November 1995. Art by Mark Bagley.

Publication information
- Publisher: Marvel Comics
- Schedule: Monthly
- Format: Limited series
- Publication date: Nov. 1995 – Dec. 1995
- No. of issues: 2
- Main character(s): Spider-Man

Creative team
- Written by: Tom DeFalco
- Penciller(s): Mark Bagley
- Inker(s): Larry Mahlstedt
- Colorist(s): Bob Sharen

The Amazing Scarlet Spider is a short-lived comic book series starring Ben Reilly as the Scarlet Spider. The series was published by Marvel Comics for four issues in November and December 1995 in between The Amazing Spider-Man #406 and #407. During this time, all four primary Spider-Man series and his quarterly series were paused and briefly replaced by Scarlet Spider counterparts; the others being Web of Scarlet Spider, Scarlet Spider, The Spectacular Scarlet Spider and Scarlet Spider Unlimited.

The five series were instituted as part of the Clone Saga after when Peter Parker gave up being Spider-Man to retire with his pregnant wife Mary Jane, and the Scarlet Spider took on his duties. Amazing (along with Spider-Man, Spectacular and Unlimited) returned to its old name and numbering when Ben Reilly left the Scarlet Spider identity behind and took on the Spider-Man name for himself.

The Scarlet Spider books were direct continuations, in terms of creative teams and story lines, of their Spider-Man counterparts. They were effectively temporary renamings of their counterparts, other than not being incorporated into their issue numbering. The writer of the two issues was Tom DeFalco and the penciller was Mark Bagley.

Both issues are collected in Spider-Man: The Complete Ben Reilly Epic Book 1.
