= Kaine Parker =

Marvel Comics character

Kaine Parker Scarlet Spider
- Cover to Scarlet Spider vol. 2 #24 (Nov. 2013). Art by Ryan Stegman. Colors by Marte Gracia Pazuzu.

Publication information
- Publisher: Marvel Comics
- First appearance: As Kaine: Web of Spider-Man #119 (December 1994); As Tarantula: The Amazing Spider-Man #637 (September 2010); As Scarlet Spider: Scarlet Spider #2 (April 2012)
- Created by: Terry Kavanagh (writer); Steven Butler (artist)

In-story information
- Full name: Kaine Parker
- Species: Human mutate
- Team affiliations: New Warriors
- Notable aliases: Peter Parker; Spider-Man; Tarantula; Scarlet Spider; The Other
- Abilities: As Kaine: Superhuman strength, speed, agility, stamina, durability, reflexes and equilibrium; Precognitive Spider Sense; Mark of Kaine; Regenerative healing factor; Immunity to the world-wide mind purging of Spider-Man's identity; Ability to stick to walls; As Tarantula: Four large spider legs; Organic webbing generation; Forearm stingers

Kaine Parker is a character appearing in American comic books published by Marvel Comics. The character has been depicted as a superhero and former supervillain who serves as an ally, an enemy, and foil to Peter Parker/Spider-Man and Ben Reilly. Created by Terry Kavanagh and Steven Butler, the character first appeared in Web of Spider-Man #119 (December 1994) as the Jackal's first failed attempt of a clone of Spider-Man. He later appeared as the new Scarlet Spider in the Marvel Point One one-shot in November 2011 before starring in his own series.

Kaine Parker/Scarlet Spider made his cinematic debut in the 2023 feature film Spider-Man: Across the Spider-Verse.

== Fictional character biography ==
=== Kaine's debut ===
Kaine, as he originally appears during the Clone Saga. Interior artwork from Amazing Spider-Man vol. 1, #397 (January 1995, Marvel Comics) Art by Mark Bagley

Kaine is the Jackal's first temporary success to clone Peter Parker but the flawed cloning process left him deformed and mentally unstable. The Jackal discards Kaine due to him showing early signs of degeneration, which will eventually kill him. Kaine experiences a strong feeling of rejection similar to that between a father and son. Kaine's degeneration gives him an enhanced version of Peter's powers, including a "precognitive sense" that shows him flashes of the future (an amplified version of Peter's spider-sense). He also possesses a "Mark of Kaine", a burning touch that he uses to leave eaten away hand prints on his victims' faces. In a later interview, former Spider-Man editor/writer Glenn Greenberg revealed that the Mark of Kaine was meant to be another analog of one of Spider-Man's powers, namely the ability to cling to walls.

The Jackal goes on to create a new, better clone which would be known as Ben Reilly. When the Jackal uses Reilly against Peter, the ensuing battle leaves Reilly and the Jackal for dead. They both manage to survive; the Jackal places himself into suspended animation in a cloning pod to awaken later; and Reilly leaves New York.

=== Trial of Peter Parker ===
Due to Norman Osborn manipulating them, Ben and Kaine each believe themselves to be the original and Peter Parker to be the clone. For a time, Kaine finds love in police detective Louise Kennedy of Salt Lake City, until he discovers she is working for criminals. This revelation, coupled with Kaine's increased cellular degeneration, pushes Kaine even further towards insanity and he kills Louise. Kaine continues to stalk Ben, making it appear as though Janine Godbe, Ben's new love, has committed suicide. Kaine frames Ben for a number of murders he commits since they have identical fingerprints, and Peter Parker is convicted for Kaine's crimes. Kaine refuses to confess to his crimes, with Peter considering revealing his secret identity to the courtroom. Kaine convinces Peter not to reveal his identity and reveals the truth about the murders.

=== Maximum Clonage ===
Kaine confronts the Jackal with the intent of destroying him, with the Jackal manipulating his mind into believing that he will be cured of the degeneration process. Once Jackal reveals this to be false, Kaine leaves, feeling dejected. Kaine returns to the Jackal's lab in time to assist Ben in a battle against numerous Spider-clones. In the ensuing battle, Spidercide impales Kaine, fatally wounding him. Despite showing disdain for Kaine, the Jackal recovers his body and places him in a pod to recover.

=== Redemption ===
Kaine is freed from his pod by James Johnsmeyer, a sponsor of the Great Game tournament. After Kaine refuses to partake in the tournament, Johnsmeyer sends several of the competitors to attack him. During a later encounter with Ben Reilly, Kaine gives up his hatred of Ben and acknowledges him as his brother. At that point, it is revealed that Kaine's degeneration is killing him, and he allows himself to be incarcerated in the Vault to atone for his previous crimes. However, he escapes along with many other criminals in the pages of Thunderbolts.

=== Return ===
Kaine later appears in New York City, attacking Spider-Man as he is tracking down Raptor. He reveals that he has sought Raptor out, hoping that he could cure his cellular degeneration, and attacks Spider-Man to keep him from the villain. He also seems to hold some enmity towards Peter, perhaps after finding out he is the actual original Spider-Man. He also is one of the few people to have remembered Peter's secret identity after the worldwide mindwipe of this knowledge by Mephisto.

It is later revealed that Kaine had secretly been working with Raptor. However, he later learns that Raptor had lied to him about being able to cure his degeneration to get him on his side. Furious, Kaine chokes Raptor, seemingly killing him.

=== Grim Hunt ===
Kaine is next seen being hunted by Ana Kravinoff and Alyosha Kravinoff. Kaine is brutally beaten, but escapes and warns Peter before falling unconscious. Later that night, after shaving his beard and cutting his hair, Kaine aids Spider-Man, Arachne, and Anya Corazon against the Kraven clan. Kaine is mauled and ultimately sacrificed to bring Kraven the Hunter back from the dead. The Kravens do not realize they have killed the wrong 'spider' until later that night. As a result of this, Kraven is now undead and can only be killed by the original Spider-Man. In the epilogue of "Grim Hunt", Kaine climbs out of his grave with mutated features, including extra eyes in a spider-like pattern on his forehead.

=== Spider-Island ===
During the Spider Island storyline, the Jackal further mutates Kaine into Tarantula, a spider-like creature resembling Man-Spider. As Tarantula, he is put under Adriana Soria's control, acting as a henchman to the Jackal. Knowing about the genetic relationship between Kaine and Peter, Soria sends Kaine to Horizon Labs to tamper with a cure being developed for the "Spider-Virus". This culminates in a battle with Peter, during which Kaine is forcefully submerged in a pool of the cure. Kaine re-emerges, his mind-link with Soria broken and his degeneration healed.

While Peter goes to the Empire State Building with Mary Jane Watson to cure New York, Kaine stays behind with the Avengers to fight the Spider Queen. As Peter weakens the Spider Queen, Kaine launches himself at the Spider-Queen and kills her by stabbing her through the throat with his newly activated arm-mounted stingers. Kaine's new powers are linked to the Other and are stated to have been activated after his death and resurrection.

After the battle, Kaine evades the other heroes during the aftermath of the battle using his stealth suit, but Madame Web is able to 'see' him regardless, and talks to him about his future. Kaine meets up with Peter at the airport and informs him that he is leaving New York.

=== Scarlet Spider solo series ===
Kaine Parker as Scarlet Spider. Scarlet Spider vol. 2 #1 variant cover. Art by Mark Bagley.

Having been cured of his mutation, but not his spider-powers, Kaine assumes the Scarlet Spider mantle and moves to Houston. Although planning to simply pass through the city and move on to Mexico, he is distracted when he discovered a human trafficking ring. Kaine saves Aracely Penalba, a girl who was smuggled into America, and decides to protect her.

Shortly after, Aracely has prophetic dreams concerning the Sixth Creation, Aztlán, her missing parents, gods, a talking coyote, and the rise of Mictlān. She and Kaine are attacked by the Lobo Brothers, the criminals behind her abduction, who intend to kill her to begin the Sixth Creation. During the fight, Aracely escapes, but Kaine is beaten and killed. His spirit encounters the Other, embraces her power, and is reborn as a monstrous spider creature. Aracely restores Kaine to his human form and proclaims him as her "champion", though he retains his connection to the Other. The two later join the New Warriors.

=== Spider-Verse ===
During the Spider-Verse storyline, Kaine is with the New Warriors in Eastern Europe when they are attacked by Daemos of the Inheritors. Daemos realizes that Kaine is the current receptacle of the Other and that his energy can sustain him for several days. Daemos is attacked by a multiversal group of Spiders, including Old Man Spider-Man, Spider-Man of Earth-70105 (Bruce Banner), and Spider-Woman of Earth-65. After Daemos breaks Banner's spine, Kaine escapes through a portal to Earth-13, also known as the Safe Zone.

The Spiders learn that the Inheritors have mastered cloning technology, allowing them to continuously be reborn in clone bodies with their memories intact. Kaine, Ben Reilly, and Black Widow attack the Inheritors' cloning facility and kill Jennix, only for her to be resurrected. After realizing that the top of the Baxter Building is a receiver that enables the Inheritors to be resurrected, Ben sacrifices himself to remove the Inheritors' safety net. Kaine takes off to Loomworld to face the Inheritors alone.

After confronting the Inheritors, Kaine kills Solus, the group's patriarch. In retaliation, Morlun kills Kaine in his monstrous spider form by ripping off one of his arms and impaling him in the skull. After Karn becomes the Master Weaver and returns all the spiders to their home universes, a human hand bursts out of Kaine's husk, revealing that he is still alive.

=== Dead No More: The Clone Conspiracy ===
Kaine returns in the Dead No More: The Clone Conspiracy storyline, where he and Spider-Gwen attempt to help Peter escape New U Technologies. It is revealed that Kaine's human body emerged from the corpse of his spider form and was greeted by Karn, who realized that he is no longer connected to the Other and is dying from the Carrion virus. Karn shows Kaine a number of realities where the virus has caused a zombie apocalypse, and Kaine decides to visit these realities to find a possible way to stop it. Kaine discovers that all the downfalls of these realities was caused by Parker Industries working with New U to spread Miles Warren's technology, which inadvertently spread the virus. Karn reveals that the events Kaine encountered in the other realities is starting to happen in Kaine's own reality. Since it is in the early process and Peter has not formed a full partnership with Warren yet, they still have a chance to stop it from happening.

After Doctor Octopus attacks the Jackal for infecting Anna Maria Marconi, he accidentally activates a kill switch that will kill Kaine, Jackal, and everyone who the Jackal had resurrected in a clone body. Kaine soon realizes that Ben Reilly is alive and is now the Jackal. Spider-Man manages to deactivate and destroy the kill switch, saving Kaine's life. In the aftermath, Kaine vows to find Ben and have him answer for his crimes.

=== Ben Reilly: The Scarlet Spider ===
In the series Ben Reilly: The Scarlet Spider, Kaine confronts Ben Reilly upon tracking him to Las Vegas and they get into a fight. Ben convinces Kaine to stand down by arguing that he is genuinely trying to cure Abigail Mercury, a young girl he had met, from a terminal illness. Kaine makes it clear to Ben that he will kill his "brother" for protecting the world if the girl dies and once Ben has saved her life. After Ben inadvertently kills Abigail while testing a new drug treatment on her, Kaine attacks Ben, only to be killed by Death taking the form of Marlo Chandler. Death offers Ben the chance to restore Abigail Mercury or Kaine to life before she departs. When Ben asks her to save both of them and kill him instead, Death heals them both and removes Ben's facial scars.

=== Spider-Geddon ===
During the "Spider-Geddon" storyline, Superior Octopus becomes Superior Spider-Man again and recruits Kaine to help fight the return of the Inheritors. Kaine volunteers for a suicide mission to Earth-3145, where the Inheritors were trapped after the events of Spider-Verse. Kaine recruits Ashley Barton from Earth-807128 and "Charlie", the Peter Parker of Earth-218, to battle Verna of the Inheritors. Kaine sacrifices himself to Verna's hounds so that Ashley and Charlie can escape Earth-3145. However, he is resurrected by Julia Carpenter using a talisman given to her by the spider goddess Neith.

== Powers and abilities ==
=== As Kaine ===
As an imperfect clone of Spider-Man, Kaine has superhuman strength, speed, agility, reflexes, and equilibrium all at higher levels than Spider-Man due to his continued mutation.

Kaine's spider-sense is even stronger than Spider-Man's Spider-Sense. Kaine Parker can sense danger, see short glimpses of the future, and can sense Venom unlike Spider-Man. Kaine also does not set off Parker or Reilly's spider-senses, but they do not set off his either.

Like Spider-Man his clinging ability is because of the Van der Waals force, but also left a distinctive scarring into surfaces (and people), which he calls the "Mark of Kaine". Additionally, Kaine possesses a retractable bone spike on the underside of each forearm.

Being a clone of Spider-Man, Kaine is immune to the worldwide mind purging of Spider-Man's identity and retains this knowledge. However, Kaine was never implanted with Peter's memories and thus lacks his scientific knowledge.

=== As Tarantula ===
The extent of Kaine's powers in his Tarantula state are not fully known. Tarantula has four large spider legs that protrude from his back much like Spider-Man's Iron Spider costume. He retained all of the abilities he had as Kaine, with the addition of organic web shooters.

=== As Scarlet Spider ===
As Scarlet Spider, Kaine generate organic webbing from his wrists, similar to Spider-Man's web-shooters, and possesses an accelerated healing factor. He also possesses enhanced vision, which grants him the ability to see in the dark, and a psychic connection with spiders and other arachnids.

After the events of Spider-Island, Kaine retained the stealth suit, which Peter Parker created at Horizon Labs and used against the Spider-Queen. This gives Kaine invisibility to both visual and audio means, along with immunity to sonic-based attacks.

== Reception ==
- In 2020, CBR.com ranked Kaine 8th in their "Marvel: Dark Spider-Man Villains, Ranked From Lamest To Coolest" list.

== Other versions ==
=== MC2 ===
An alternate universe version of Kaine Parker from Earth-982 appears in the MC2 imprint. This version is a former ally of the Kingpin who attempted to kill him after being betrayed. However, he is defeated by Spider-Girl and imprisoned. There, he is recruited by special agent Arthur Whedon to lead a group of redeemed supervillains consisting of Big Man, Quickwire, Raptor, and Normie Osborn.

=== Spider-Man: Clone Saga ===
An alternate universe version of Kaine Parker from Earth-91101 appears in Spider-Man: The Clone Saga. This version works for the Jackal and Harry Osborn before defying the two after kidnapping May Parker, the infant daughter of Peter Parker and Mary Jane Watson.

=== Ultimate Marvel ===
An alternate universe version of Kaine Parker from Earth-1610 appears in Ultimate Spider-Man. This version was created by Doctor Octopus and sports a version of Ben Reilly's Spider-Man costume. Kaine kidnaps Mary Jane Watson and attempts to give her superpowers, causing her to transform into a red goblin-like creature despite the Tarantula's efforts. While trying to prevent Mary Jane from being taken, Kaine is killed by Nick Fury's Spider-Slayers.

=== Spider-Man '94 ===
An alternate universe version of Kaine Parker from Earth-92131 appears in the 5-issue limited series continuation of the Spider-Man: The Animated Series titled Spider-Man '94. This version was created by Morlun, and is a failed clone of himself, who serves as his minion in hunting animal Totems.

== Collected editions ==
Title	Material Collected	ISBN	Release
Scarlet Spider Vol. 1: Life After Death	Scarlet Spider Vol. 2 #1–6, material from Marvel Point One	978-0785163107	February 2013
Scarlet Spider Vol. 2: Lone Star	Scarlet Spider Vol. 2 #7–9, 12.1, 13–15	978-0785163114	April 2013
Carnage: Minimum Carnage	Scarlet Spider Vol. 2 #10–12	978-0785167266	January 2013
Scarlet Spider Vol. 3: The Big Leagues	Scarlet Spider Vol. 2 #16–20, Superior Spider-Man Team-Up #2	978-0785166498	November 2013
Scarlet Spider Vol. 4: Into the Grave	Scarlet Spider Vol. 2 #21–25	978-0785166504	February 2014
Chasm: Curse of Kaine	Chasm: Curse of Kaine #1–4, Web of Spider-Man (2024) #1	978-1302959289	June 2025

== In other media ==
=== Television ===
- Several variations of Kaine Parker appear in Ultimate Spider-Man:
  - The comic version's aggressive personality and Scarlet Spider costume are amalgamated with Ben Reilly (voiced by Scott Porter).
  - Kaine appears in the three-part episode "The Spider-Slayers", voiced by Drake Bell. This version is an imperfect synthezoid Spider-Slayer created by Doctor Octopus using Peter Parker's DNA and Arnim Zola's technology who is highly resistant to damage, can reattach lost limbs, and absorb life energy from Spider-themed individuals or other synthezoids. He first emerges after Spider-Man and Spider-Woman find one of Hydra's abandoned labs and they seemingly defeat him. Kaine reemerges as a deformed, mutated monster, absorbs the other synthezoids, and becomes the Ultimate Spider-Slayer, only to be defeated by Agent Venom.

=== Film ===
Kaine Parker as the Scarlet Spider makes a non-speaking appearance in Spider-Man: Across the Spider-Verse as a member of Miguel O'Hara's Spider-Society.

=== Video games ===
- Kaine Parker as the Scarlet Spider appears as an unlockable costume for Peter Parker / Spider-Man in The Amazing Spider-Man and The Amazing Spider-Man 2.
- Kaine Parker as the Scarlet Spider, the Tarantula, and the Other appear as separate playable characters in Spider-Man Unlimited.
- Kaine Parker's Scarlet Spider suit appears as an unlockable costume for Peter Parker / Spider-Man in Spider-Man (2018) via "The Heist" DLC.
