= The Spectacular Scarlet Spider =

- The Spectacular Scarlet Spider #1, November 1995. Art by Sal Buscema.

Publication information
- Publisher: Marvel Comics
- Schedule: Monthly
- Format: Limited series
- Publication date: Nov. 1995 - Dec. 1995
- No. of issues: 2
- Main character: Spider-Man

Creative team
- Written by: Todd DeZago
- Penciller: Sal Buscema

The Spectacular Scarlet Spider is a short-lived comic book series starring Ben Reilly as the Scarlet Spider. The series was published by Marvel Comics for four issues in November and December 1995 in between The Spectacular Spider-Man issues 229 and 230. During this time, all four primary Spider-Man series and his quarterly series were paused and briefly replaced by Scarlet Spider counterparts; the others being Web of Scarlet Spider, The Amazing Scarlet Spider, Scarlet Spider, and Scarlet Spider Unlimited.

The five series were instituted as part of the Clone Saga after when Peter Parker gave up being Spider-Man to retire with his pregnant wife Mary Jane, and the Scarlet Spider took on his duties. Spectacular (along with Amazing, Spider-Man and Unlimited) returned to its old name and numbering when Ben Reilly left the Scarlet Spider identity behind and took on the Spider-Man name for himself.

The Scarlet Spider books were direct continuations, in terms of creative teams and story lines, of their Spider-Man counterparts. They were effectively temporary renamings of their counterparts, other than not being incorporated into their issue numbering. The writer of the two issues was Todd DeZago and the penciller was Sal Buscema.

The first issue is notable for being the first appearance of Override.

Both issues are collected in Spider-Man: The Complete Ben Reilly Epic Book 1.
