= Web of Scarlet Spider =

1995 short-lived comic book series

- Web of Scarlet Spider #1, November 1995.

Publication information
- Publisher: Marvel Comics
- Schedule: Monthly
- Format: Limited series
- Publication date: Nov. 1995 – Feb. 1996
- No. of issues: 4
- Main character: Spider-Man

Creative team
- Written by: Tom DeFalco; Todd DeZago; Evan Skolnick
- Penciller(s): Paris Karounos; Tom Morgan

Web of Scarlet Spider is a short-lived comic book series starring Ben Reilly as the Scarlet Spider. The series was published by Marvel Comics for four issues between November 1995 and February 1996, following Web of Spider-Man issue #129.

During this time, all four primary Spider-Man series and his quarterly series were paused and briefly replaced by Scarlet Spider counterparts; the others being The Amazing Scarlet Spider, Scarlet Spider, The Spectacular Scarlet Spider, and Scarlet Spider Unlimited.

The five series were instituted as part of the Clone Saga after Peter Parker gave up being Spider-Man to retire with his pregnant wife, Mary Jane, and the Scarlet Spider took on his duties. The Spectacular Spider-Man (along with Amazing, Spider-Man and Unlimited) returned to its old name and numbering when Ben Reilly left the Scarlet Spider identity behind and took on the Spider-Man name for himself.

The Scarlet Spider books were direct continuations, in terms of creative teams and storylines, of their Spider-Man counterparts. They were effectively temporary renamings of their counterparts, other than not being incorporated into their issue numbering. Creators who contributed to the title include writers Tom DeFalco, Todd DeZago, and Evan Skolnick and pencillers Paris Karounos and Tom Morgan.

The first two months of Scarlet Spider titles saw a holographic Scarlet Spider impostor destroy the real Spider's reputation. As a result, Ben Reilly (the real Spider) decided to abandon the Scarlet Spider guise in favor of a new Spider-Man costume in Spectacular Scarlet Spider #2. Web continued for two more issues, following Joe Wade in a three-part crossover that included New Warriors vol. 1 #67. Wade was an FBI agent who became possessed by nanotechnology in Lady Octopus's lab explosion, giving him Scarlet Spider's appearance and powers.

The first two issues are collected in Spider-Man: The Complete Ben Reilly Epic Book 1. Issues three and four, along with New Warriors #67, were collected in Spider-Man: The Complete Ben Reilly Epic Book 2.
