= Ben Reilly =

Character in the Marvel Universe

- Ben Reilly as Scarlet Spider, as appeared in Spider-Man Collectors' Preview #1 (December 1994). Character design by Tom Lyle

Publication information
- Publisher: Marvel Comics
- First appearance: As Peter Parker's clone: The Amazing Spider-Man #149 (October 1975); Return: Web of Spider-Man #114 (May 1994); Identified as Ben Reilly: Spider-Man #51 (October 1994); As Scarlet Spider: Web of Spider-Man #118 (November 1994); As Spider-Man: Sensational Spider-Man #0 (January 1996); As Jackal: The Clone Conspiracy #3 (December 2016); As Chasm: The Amazing Spider-Man #93 (March 2022)
- Created by: Gerry Conway (writer); Ross Andru (artist) (based upon Spider-Man by Stan Lee and Steve Ditko)

In-story information
- Full name: Benjamin "Ben" Reilly (born Peter Parker)
- Species: Human mutate clone
- Place of origin: The Catskill Mountains, New York
- Team affiliations: The New Warriors; New U Technologies; The Midnight Sons; The Spider-Army/Web-Warriors
- Notable aliases: Chasm, Scarlet Spider, Spider-Man, Spider-Carnage, Peter Parker, Henry Jones, Jackal, Man in Red, Canadian Spider-Man
- Abilities: As Scarlet Spider: Superhuman strength, speed, durability, agility, stamina, reflexes/reactions, coordination, balance and endurance; Spider physiology: high pain tolerance, precognitive spider-sense ability, cling to most solid surfaces; Master martial artist, hand-to-hand combatant, and expert swordsman; Spider-sense helps against enemies; Genius-level intellect: Proficient scientist and inventor; Utilizes wrist-worn web-shooters to fire various projectiles include a strong air-expanding adhesive substance in variety of forms of artificial webbings (web-lines and impact webbing), sedative stingers, and mini-dot tracers; Undetectable to Spider-Man's spider-sense; As Spider-Carnage: Limited shapeshifting and camouflage; Symbiote's autonomous defense capabilities; Healing factor

Benjamin "Ben" Reilly (/ˈraɪli/), also known as the Scarlet Spider, is a superhero appearing in American comic books published by Marvel Comics. Grown in a lab by Miles Warren/Jackal, he is a clone of Peter Parker/Spider-Man tasked with fighting him but instead becomes an ally, later even regarded as a "brother". Created by writer Gerry Conway, the character first appeared in The Amazing Spider-Man #149 (October 1975) and is seemingly killed in the same issue. The character returned and featured prominently in the 1994–1996 "Clone Saga" storyline, adopting the "Scarlet Spider" alias with a costume similar to Spider-Man's consisting of a red spandex bodysuit and mask complemented by a blue sleeveless hoodie sweatshirt adorned with a large spider symbol on both sides, along with a utility belt and bulkier web-shooters. This Scarlet Spider costume was designed by artist Tom Lyle. When Peter Parker temporarily left the Spider-Man role, Ben became the new Spider-Man while wearing a new costume variation designed by artist Mark Bagley. However, Ben dies at the hands of Norman Osborn/Green Goblin, sacrificing himself to save Parker who then resumes the Spider-Man role.

In 2016–2017's Dead No More: The Clone Conspiracy story, the character is revealed to be alive, his mind forcibly transferred to new clone bodies by the Jackal repeatedly before his resurrection was successful. Driven mad by the experience of being reborn and dying repeatedly, he became the new Jackal and started his own criminal enterprise. After being defeated by Spider-Man and others, Ben reclaims his Scarlet Spider identity in the series Ben Reilly: The Scarlet Spider. Reimagined as an antihero, he first hopes to escape his past then embarks on a spiritual quest to redeem himself. This arc is completed in "Spider-Geddon" (2018), during which he sacrifices himself to protect others when his life force is absorbed by an enemy who inadvertently absorbs his many death traumas as well. Ben is then resurrected in a new clone body, his mind and soul healed and restored. During the events of the 2021–2022 storyline "Beyond", Ben temporarily became Spider-Man again, only for him to have his memories purged from him, leading him to become the villain Chasm. Due to his many resurrections in different clone bodies, the 2017–2018 comic series Ben Reilly: The Scarlet Spider states he has died and returned more than anyone else in the Marvel Universe, leading to him becoming favored by Death.

The character made his cinematic debut in the 2023 feature film Spider-Man: Across the Spider-Verse, voiced by Andy Samberg. Nicolas Cage portrays a version of Spider-Man Noir who uses Ben Reilly as an alias in the 2026 streaming television series Spider-Noir.

== Publication history ==
Ben Reilly was first featured as Spider-Man in The Amazing Spider-Man #149 as a nameless clone of Peter Parker who seemingly dies alongside his creator the Jackal, who had also created a clone of Parker's lost love Gwen Stacy. The events of the issue were later revisited in several comics such as What If #30. Asked why he created the character, writer Gerry Conway explained:

One of the things I was trying to do at that time was take ideas to their logical, yet absurd conclusion, reductio ad absurdum. The idea was that if we have Gwen Stacy brought back as a clone, how can I up the stakes when I get rid of her? When I write her out of the book, what can I do to make that really effective and to punctuate it, to bring it to the next level? And I thought, if we can clone Gwen, we can certainly clone Peter. I was also at that time enamored with titles that played off of old, melodramatic Stan Lee titles of the past. ... I came up with the title, "If I Kill Me, Will I Die?" (Note: The actual published title is "Even if I Live...I Die!". The source gives no indication whether the title was changed prior to publication or Conway simply misremembered it.) It was basically a parody of an old overdramatic Stan Lee title, but I also thought it was a good title in general. So that's really what the impetus was – to raise the stakes, give us a good finish to the Gwen Stacy saga, and to allow me to have a little fun with the storytelling conventions of the time.

Though Conway had no intention of using the character beyond this initial story in which he dies, Reilly returned to the comics during the "Clone Saga", which ran from October 1994 to December 1996 through all five of the concurrent Spider-Man titles — The Amazing Spider-Man, Web of Spider-Man, Spider-Man, Spider-Man Unlimited, and The Spectacular Spider-Man. Editor Danny Fingeroth directed the Spider-Man artists to design a costume for the character which would stand out from conventional superhero costumes by emphasizing simple functionality rather than flash. The artists worked on costume ideas independently, and according to Mark Bagley, Tom Lyle's "hoodie" design won unanimous approval among them. The original costume was later replaced by an updated Spider-Man costume designed by Bagley with minor alterations by Bob Budiansky.

Between November and December 1995, the Scarlet Spider replaced Spider-Man in all five of the comics' titles, which were renamed The Amazing Scarlet Spider, Web of Scarlet Spider, Scarlet Spider, Scarlet-Spider Unlimited, and The Spectacular Scarlet Spider. Reilly was also featured prominently in the supplemental material provided for the storyline, including Spider-Man: The Lost Years and Spider-Man: Clone Journals. The storyline was later revisited in What If (vol. 2) #86. Reilly was passed the mantle of Spider-Man and was featured throughout the Spider-Man titles The Amazing Spider-Man, The Spectacular Spider-Man, Spider-Man, Spider-Man Unlimited, and The Sensational Spider-Man, which replaced Web of Spider-Man as an ongoing monthly title. Reilly remained as the featured Spider-Man between January and December 1996. During this period, the character also featured in two intercompany crossovers DC vs. Marvel with DC Comics and Backlash/Spider-Man with Image Comics.

Though the character was not used in mainstream continuity for several years after his death in Spider-Man #75, the character was often alluded to and provided the foundation to the backstory in the Spider-Girl mythology. In January 2009, Reilly returned to comics as Spider-Man in the third part of Marvel's X-Men/Spider-Man miniseries. Written by Christos Gage, the series explores episodes in the histories of both the X-Men and Spider-Man, sticking thoroughly to the source material of the time frames that the stories take place in. Issue #3 marked the first new adventure featuring Reilly in more than 12 years. Starting in 2009 and continuing into 2010, Marvel published a six-issue miniseries titled Spider-Man: The Clone Saga that was a retelling of the story as it had originally been envisioned. In 2010, Marvel began collecting the story in trade paperback and hardcover forms (ISBN 978-0-7851-4805-0). The epic spans five books and covers Reilly's time on the road, through his encounters with Peter and Mary Jane Watson, up to his role as the Scarlet Spider, as the lone spider hero in New York.

=== Mooted return ===
On July 25, 2010, at San Diego Comic-Con, fans expressed their desire to see a return of Ben Reilly. To this, assistant editor Tom Brennan replied, "It's being worked on". During the 2011 San Diego Comic-Con, a teaser image was posted on Marvel.com of Reilly's shirt in flames, entitled "The return of The Scarlet Spider?" It is revealed in The Amazing Spider-Man #673 and the Marvel Point One one-shot that Kaine would be the new Scarlet Spider in his own ongoing series, which was confirmed by editor Steve Wacker in the "Letters to the Editor" page of #673.

=== Resurrection ===
Ben Reilly returns in the storyline Dead No More: The Clone Conspiracy, it revealed he was repeatedly resurrected, killed and resurrected again by the Jackal as the villain tried to perfect a new cloning process. Broken by the memory and experience of over two dozen deaths, Ben took control of the Jackal's scheme, even adopting the villain's name for himself, and created a new cloning process that included a better memory transfer but required the clone to ingest a pill on a daily basis to maintain their cellular composition, lest their flesh, muscles, organs, and bones deteriorate until only the nervous system, eyes, and brain remain. He eventually planned to save the human race from death and disease by killing everyone and transferring their memories to super-clones who could then continually have their mind transferred to new bodies if they ever suffered fatal injury, continuations of the original person rather than copies and calling them "reanimates." After a final confrontation with Peter forces him to abandon his plans and resources, Ben relocates to Las Vegas. He initially tries to escape his past and punishment for his actions while being haunted by hallucinations, adopting the Scarlet Spider identity again. His experiences eventually help restore some of his sanity and set him back on the path to be a hero, before learning he has been favoured by Lady Death as her new favourite person from how many times he had died and returned, and how many people he had revived via his reanimations, to whose bodies their souls returned. Death warns Ben that since his soul has degraded with each death and revival, in spite of his wish to return to heroism, his next death and return will lead him to a path of villainy, a plotline followed up on in Spider-Man Beyond, at the end of which Ben is rendered a bitter partial amnesiac, as the villain Chasm.

== Fictional character biography ==
=== Creation ===
Professor Miles Warren, unhealthily obsessed with his late student Gwen Stacy who died at the Green Goblin's hands, attempts various experiments, learning Peter Parker was Spider-Man. Blaming the web-slinger for marking Gwen as a target, Warren (taking on the villain alter ego the Jackal) attempts to clone the hero. Parker's first clone, Kaine, suffers from clone degeneration and is dismissed, but successful clones of both Parker and Stacy with stable cell structures are later created. After multiple attacks on Spider-Man, the Jackal forces the hero and his clone to fight, each believing the other is the clone. The two team up to save Parker's colleague Ned Leeds and Gwen's clone. In the process, Warren and Spider-Man's clone appear to be killed in an explosion. Spider-Man's clone survives and realizes he is not the real Peter Parker. Rather than attempt to replace Parker, he leaves New York to embark on a nomadic life, naming himself Ben Reilly as a nod to his original self's uncle Ben Parker and May Parker's maiden surname.

=== Exile ===
During his travels, Ben Reilly befriends geneticist Seward Trainer, becoming the man's lab assistant and honing his scientific prowess to university graduate level under his mentorship. Ben trusts Trainer with his secrets and the man becomes a father figure. Reilly is hunted by Kaine, the scarred and resentful failed clone of Peter Parker. Later, Reilly works with scientist Damon Ryder, who mutates himself into a dinosaur hybrid called Raptor. An attack by Kaine causes a fire that kills Ryder's family, though the scientist blames Reilly for this tragedy. At one point, Reilly finds love with college student Janine Godbe who then reveals her true identity is Elizabeth Tyne, a fugitive who killed her father after enduring incestuous rape. After Janine apparently commits suicide out of guilt for her crime, Reilly continues his travels.

=== Scarlet Spider ===
Five years after leaving New York City, Ben Reilly discovers May Parker suffered a stroke and may not recover. He returns to New York City, leading to a confrontation with the original Peter Parker who at this time is bitter, angry, and prone to violent rages following recent traumatic events. After the two handle a hostage situation at Ravencroft, Peter attempts to reclaim his humanity and Ben decides to remain in the city for a while.

When Venom (Eddie Brock) goes on a rampage, Reilly decides to stop Venom, donning a red bodysuit along with a blue spider hoodie he buys at a museum. Armed with improved web-shooters he developed, he defeats Venom and is dubbed the "Scarlet Spider" by Daily Bugle reporter Ken Ellis. Ben and Peter later reunite and come to believe that Peter is actually the clone and Ben the original.

Scarlet Spider joins the New Warriors for a brief time and develops an attraction to teammate Firestar. After a few more adventures, Peter is nearly killed in action and decides to retire as Spider-Man to be a better husband and father. He and Mary Jane leave New York City. During gang warfare between Lady Octopus and Alistair Smythe, a holographic duplicate of the Scarlet Spider ruins Ben's reputation, causing him to drop the Scarlet Spider identity.

=== Ben Reilly as Spider-Man ===
Ben Reilly as Spider-Man, wearing the costume designed by Mark Bagley. Art by Dan Jurgens and Klaus Janson.

Ben Reilly adopts the Spider-Man identity with a new costume. Only a few heroes and villains realize this equivalent of Spider-Man is a different person than before. In his civilian life, Ben dyes his hair blonde and starts working at a café called the Daily Grind. He bonded with the Carnage symbiote as Spider-Carnage which John Jameson helped in removing. He starts a relationship with Jessica Carradine, a student at Centennial University with a personal vendetta against Spider-Man, convinced the hero is a murderer. Ben later discovers her late father was the burglar who killed Ben Parker and went into foster care after the man's arrest. Jessica then reveals her father told her he had been framed for Ben Parker's murder. She blames the wall-crawling vigilante not only for taking away her parent, but for his death during another encounter with Spider-Man, unwilling to believe it was simply a heart-attack brought on by stress. After Jessica discovers Ben is Spider-Man, she confronts the truth of her father. Ultimately accepting that Spider-Man is a hero when she sees him risk his life to save people from a burning building, she decides to start a new life on her own rather than remain with Ben.

Ben's life and work are targeted by the Hobgoblin on orders of Spider-Man's old enemy Mendel Stromm, now called Gaunt. After Peter and Mary Jane return to New York, Ben realizes Seward Trainer has been working with Gaunt for years. Peter and Ben cement their relationship, now regarding each other as brothers and enjoying that they share the same childhood memories. Ben introduces Peter to the Daily Grind staff as his "cousin". Reilly's former lover Janine Godbe is revealed to be alive, forced to fake her death years ago by Kaine as a means of hurting Ben. After multiple confrontations, Kaine accepts he has been avoiding responsibility for his actions and turns himself over to the authorities. Inspired, Janine does the same.

==== Death ====
Norman Osborn reveals himself to be the architect behind Parker's last few years of trauma, all part of a plan to drive the hero insane, including having Seward Trainer create false lab results so he would mistakenly believe he was the clone and Reilly the original. Since Peter has withstood his many trials, Osborn has lost patience and decided to act directly. While Mary Jane is poisoned and loses her child in stillbirth, the original Goblin fights Parker. The battle ends when Reilly takes a fatal wound intended for Peter. He dies and his body decomposes rapidly, confirming he was actually a clone. Peter reclaims the Spider-Man identity.

=== Dead No More: The Clone Conspiracy ===
Ben Reilly as the new Jackal, from Dead No More: The Clone Conspiracy #4 (Jan. 2017) by Jim Cheung.

Ben Reilly returns in the 2015 All-New, All-Different Marvel branding, where he assumes the alias of Anubis, the jackal-headed Egyptian god of death. It is revealed that Miles Warren survived the events of Maximum Clonage and resurrected Ben in a clone body. When the new body has problems with cellular degradation, Warren kills Ben and tries again. He does this many times, with Ben's memory transfer ensuring he recalls each death leading up to his stable 27th body. Traumatized by the memory of 26 deaths, Ben breaks free, defeats Warren, and decides to use his technology and operation to prevent anyone else from suffering the tragedy of death. He adopts a mask of Anubis and as the new Jackal he improves the cloning process, now seeing his new clone creations as "reanimates," continuations of the original person rather than simply copies. His reanimates seem improved in many ways but carry a latent form of a new Carrion virus in their cells.

Publicly, Reilly uses the company New U Technologies to offer cutting edge healing and organ replacement for people, even those with terminal conditions. Peter Parker, head of Parker Industries at the time, becomes suspicious and investigates. Reilly later reveals himself and shows he has resurrected people whose deaths have caused Spider-Man guilt, all of whom now live in a neighborhood-like facility called Haven. Reilly asks Peter to join him but the latter concludes the new Jackal is using power without considering the responsibility of his actions, drawing attention to the fact that Reilly hasn't revived Uncle Ben; Peter observes that if Reilly truly believed he was doing the right thing Ben would have been the first person Reilly brought back, but as it stands he knows their uncle wouldn't approve of what he's doing. A signal is activated that destabilizes the bodies of the reanimates, meaning the new airborne Carrion virus will now activate in most if not all of them. Reilly decides to let this plague spread across Earth so he can replace everyone with genetically improved reanimates, but his plan is stopped. With his own body breaking down, Reilly saves himself using New U Pills and Webware Technology, but now bears scars all over his face and body. After a brief confrontation with the original Jackal, Ben leaves to start a new life, still believing his work was for the good of humanity.

=== Ben Reilly: The Scarlet Spider ===
Relocating to Las Vegas, the disfigured Ben is tracked down by former New U Technologies client Cassandra Mercury, owner of the Mercury Rising casino, who wants revenge for his failure to cure her daughter Abigail's terminal disease. Ben buys time by telling Cassandra he can develop a cure in exchange for a lab and resources. He lives and works in the Mercury Rising casino, identifying himself as "Peter." During this time, Ben is haunted by hallucinations of his old self telling him to be more heroic and his Jackal self defending their actions. He steals a Spider-Man cosplayer's hooded costume, then later takes a copy of his original Scarlet Spider outfit from a Spider-Man fan. Operating at times as a vigilante, he uses harsher methods than before, sometimes using a gun to deliver nonlethal injuries.

Kaine Parker arrives in Las Vegas, desiring Ben's death for his actions as the Jackal. Reilly argues he is trying to cure Abigail Mercury's condition, but his untested serum backfires and kills the girl. Kaine attacks, only to be seemingly killed by Death. Death explains no other person has been brought back to life as often as Ben and this has corrupted his soul; one more resurrection will likely shatter his soul and sanity. She offers to restore Abigail or Kaine to life, but Ben asks her to save both and take him instead. Impressed, Death heals Kaine and Abigail and removes Ben's scars. During a later battle, Ben uses excessive force and regains scarring around an eye. Death explains he is still being tested and will manifest more scars again if he engages in corrupt behavior.

Some time later, Ben injects Abigail with what seems to be a blood sample from the angel Gabriel, though Abigail succumbs to her fatal disease. The demon lord Mephisto then tricks Kaine into killing Reilly. Abigail ascended to an angelic level of existence and decides to resurrect Ben since Mephisto overstepped his bounds by arranging the man to die earlier than he should. Ben refuses, remembering Death's warning that his soul will be shattered and he might become evil. Abigail assures him he's still a hero at heart and soon afterwards Ben awakes in a body bag in an ambulance.

=== Spider-Geddon ===
During Spider-Geddon, Otto Octavius recruits Kaine to help fight the Inheritors, vampiric beings who feed on the life force of animal totems, particularly Spider heroes across reality. Overhearing that the Inheritors plan to use New U Technologies to rebuild their cloning machine to ensure they cannot die, Ben, still suffering from his evil soul, volunteers his services, wishing to prevent his technology from causing more harm. Octavius begrudgingly agrees only to apparently betray Ben later, by offering him to the Inheritors in exchange for leaving other Spiders alone. The Inheritor called Jennix takes Ben's life force, but also absorbs the experience of Ben's 27 deaths which drives the Inheritor insane, just as planned. Following his sacrifice and Jennix absorbing his death traumas, Octavius resurrects Ben a 28th time with his mind restored.

=== Spider-Man Beyond ===
At an unspecified point, Ben is recruited by the Beyond Corporation, taking on the mantle of Spider-Man for a second time. He takes a newly modified costume designed by Beyond into the field when Bushwacker seizes control of a building in Dallas. To assure Ben's unwavering loyalty, the Beyond corporation arrange for the prison release of Elizabeth Tyne, Ben's true love. The Beyond Corporation alters Ben's memories to maintain control over him, causing him to lose his sense of responsibility. The Corporation pits Ben against Peter, telling him they've built a device that can restore his memories. In the ensuing conflict, Ben is exposed to special matter-manipulating polymers that the Beyond Corporation created and disappears. Ben resurfaces months later, having deteriorated further and become unable to perceive his own face. Additionally, he is bathed in green and black energy that seems related to the shifting properties of the polymers. Donning a twisted green and purple version of his Spider-Man suit, Ben declares his old self "dead" and assumes the villainous persona of Chasm.

=== Dark Web ===
During the "Dark Web" storyline, Chasm finds himself drawn to Limbo, where he and Janine plan to get his memory back. They end up meeting Madelyne Pryor as Chasm forms an alliance with her. With Janine transformed into Hallows' Eve, Ben talked to Pryor, expressing his desire to consume Peter Parker's soul. The two get Venom on their side by ripping out all memories he has of his son Dylan Brock, regressing Venom back into his vicious persona. Chasm kidnaps J. Jonah Jameson and Robbie Robertson and sends them to Limbo. When he confronts Spider-Man and reveals this information, Chasm unleashes six demons who have become pastiches of his rogues gallery. Hallows' Eve later gives Chasm the Scythe of Sorrows. He usurps the throne of Limbo from Pryor, transforms into a demonic form called King Chasm, and leads his forces into attacking Earth. After Chasm is defeated, Pryor imprisons him in a cell within a Limbo building that becomes the Limbo Embassy.

=== Post-Dark Web ===
Chasm later masters his energy powers, allowing him to escape Limbo. Targeting the Winkler device with the hopes that it will help him regain his memories, Chasm reunites with Hallows' Eve as they ally with Queen Goblin. Queen Goblin betrays Chasm and attempts to mutate him, but he is saved by Spider-Man. When Spider-Man is corrupted by the sins of Norman Osborn, Chasm uses special goo to allow Spider-Man to regain control of his body.

=== Curse of Kaine ===
Chasm and Hallows' Eve later settle in an abandoned church. After Chasm falls under the control of Druig, Hallows' Eve attempts to stop Druig, who reveals that he is using Chasm as part of a plan to enable Mole Man to invade the surface. After Kaine frees Chasm from Druig's control, they go their separate ways as Chasm heads to help Hallows' Eve fight Mole Man's forces.

After Peter Parker is transported to another planet by Hellgate, Norman Osborn begins operating as Spider-Man in his place. Ben Reilly begins impersonating Peter while taking part in his life. After being attacked by Shocker, Ben is saved by Norman and Black Cat. Following a brief fight, Ben escapes. While speaking with Felicia Hardy, Ben states that he does not know who the current Spider-Man is and that he has gained appreciation for what Peter has.

== Powers and equipment ==
As Spider-Man's clone, Ben Reilly possesses proportionate spider-like abilities and traits identical to Peter Parker's, including superhuman strength, speed, reflexes, stamina, resiliency, and agility, along with the ability to cling to almost any surface granted by consciously commanding his body to do so. The process seems similar to the van der Waals force and has been described as "the ability to mentally control the flux of the inner-atomic attraction between molecular boundary layers. Ben's reflexes and stamina operate up to 40 times faster than an average person's, while his strength allows him to lift 150 times his own weight (approximate limit of 10 tons). He can leap thirty feet into the air from a standing position. Ben's superhumanly enhanced muscles, bones, and body are more resistant to injury than the average human. Like Peter, Ben has a precognitive "spider-sense" warning him of incoming danger and threats, manifesting as a buzzing in the base of his skull. In battle, Ben can allow this sense to guide his reflexes to help dodge attacks.

Ben possesses Peter Parker's genius-level scientific intellect with particular talents towards applied science, chemistry, biology, engineering, physics, mathematics, and mechanics. During his travels, Ben was able to spend more time improving his scientific knowledge and experience and came to surpass Peter's skill in some fields. Because Ben was not in the role of Spider-Man for five years while traveling, and did not engage in regular combat during his time as the Jackal, his fighting style is less polished than Peter's. Kaine notes that Ben is more reliant on tactics rather than his physical skill and is a calculating and cunning combatant.

Like Peter Parker, Ben is armed with wrist-worn web-shooters that each holds several cartridges of "web-fluid", a chemical mixture that solidifies on exposure to air. Released from a pressurized valve, the web-fluid can (depending on the valve's adjustment) become an expanding net, a thin web-line, or an adhesive, malleable goo. Ben's web-shooters use more advanced triggers than Peter's and include features such as "impact webbing", temporary paralysis-inducing "stingers", and "mini-dot" tracers (a smaller version of Peter's spider-tracers). Due to these advances, Ben's web-shooters are bulkier than Peter's, so he wears them on the outside of his costumes. Like Peter, Ben wears a belt that carries spare web-fluid cartridges.

== Other versions ==
=== Marvel Zombies ===
An alternate universe version of Ben Reilly appears in Marvel Zombies: Dead Days.

=== Spider-Boy ===
Spider-Boy, a composite character based on Ben Reilly and DC Comics character Superboy, appears in the Amalgam Comics imprint.

=== Spider-Man: Life Story ===
An alternate universe version of Ben Reilly appears in Spider-Man: Life Story, a series in which the characters age normally rather than being affected by comic book time. This version was created by Miles Warren at the insistence of Norman Osborn. Harry Osborn later destroys Warren's containment tubes, with Peter's clone and a clone of Gwen Stacy surviving. One year later, the clones rename themselves as Ben and Helen Parker (later Reilly) and move out of New York for a second chance at life. In 2006, Ben is murdered by Morlun.

=== Spider-Man: The Clone Saga ===
In September 2009, a six-issue miniseries based on the Clone Saga comics of the 1990s, titled Spider-Man: The Clone Saga, was issued. The purpose of the miniseries was to tell the story as it was initially conceived. In this version of events, Mary Jane Watson's child is not stillborn and is kidnapped by Alison Mongrain. Mongrain later entrusts the baby to Kaine Parker, who manages to return her to her parents. Ben Reilly leaves New York to travel the world and find a life for himself.

=== "Spider-Verse" ===
During the 2014 "Spider-Verse" storyline, Ben Reilly of Earth-94 is recruited into a team of multiverse Spider-Totems to fend off the Inheritors, who are trying to devour every Spider-Totem. In this particular universe, Peter Parker's powers did not return, with Peter remaining in Oregon while Ben has developed into a far lighter character without the burden of Peter's past. He is particularly aided by the string of successes that he had as Spider-Man, including saving Marla Jameson from Alistair Smythe and preventing Doctor Octopus from taking his body.

This version of Ben Reilly leads a team featuring fellow clones Kaine Parker and the Jessica Drew of Earth-1610 who are sent on a mission that requires their 'expertise' as clones of Spider-Man. Their mission sends them to Earth-802, a world conquered by the Inheritors and ruled over by the Inheritor Jennix, whose efforts to clone Spider-Totems failed to clone the Spider-Essence itself. Despite their efforts to infiltrate said world, the Spider-Clones would end up doing battle with the dimension's versions of Iron Man and the Human Torch, as well as Jennix himself. Reilly sacrifices himself to destroy the Inheritors' cloning facility, which they used to resurrect themselves.

=== Ultimate Marvel ===
In Ultimate Marvel (Earth-1610), Ben Reilly is an African-American scientist who worked with Curt Connors at Empire State University, creating Carnage: a clone of Peter Parker with Lizard's and Venom's DNA. The symbiote is nicknamed "Little Ben" Reilly after Reilly. Carnage later kills Gwen Stacy, only to be assimilated by her. Gwen's mind ends up overtaking that of Little Ben, resulting in her becoming Carnage until Carnage is sucked out of her and consumed by Eddie Brock.

=== What If? ===
- What If? #30, "What If Spider-Man's Clone Had Lived?", depicts a world where, after the Jackal's bomb explodes at Shea Stadium, both Spider-Men are knocked unconscious and the clone awakens before the original. The clone, believing that he is the original Peter Parker, puts the unconscious Parker into stasis in one of the Jackal's clone-growing devices for safety and attempts to continue with life as normal. However, the clone has no memories from the time before the cell samples he had been grown from were taken, and is confused and lost in the world of the real Peter Parker. This memory gap and the discovery of the Jackal's notes on his cloning process, leads the clone to realize what he truly is. After some hesitation, he frees the real Parker in time for both of them to confront the Kingpin.
- What If? vol. 2 #86, "What If Scarlet Spider Killed Spider-Man?", gives an alternate ending of the "Clone Saga". During the time Spider-Man is under the Jackal's control, the Scarlet Spider and Spider-Man fight until there is an explosion. Ben Reilly's body is later found washed ashore and Peter Parker is believed to be dead.

== In other media ==
=== Television ===
Ben Reilly as he appears in Spider-Man: The Animated Series

- Ben Reilly as the Scarlet Spider makes a non-speaking cameo appearance in the X-Men: The Animated Series episode "One Man's Worth".
- Ben Reilly as the Scarlet Spider makes a non-speaking cameo appearance in the Fantastic Four episode "Nightmare in Green".
- Ben Reilly as the Scarlet Spider appears in the Spider-Man: The Animated Series series finale "Spider-Wars", voiced by Christopher Daniel Barnes. This version is from an alternate reality where Miles Warren created a clone of Peter Parker and altered both his and the original's memories. Unsure of whether he was the clone or not, one of them changed his identity to "Ben Reilly/Scarlet Spider" in an attempt to escape the confusion. When the "original" Spider-Man becomes Spider-Carnage and nearly succeeds in destroying the multiverse, the Beyonder and Madame Web recruit the Scarlet Spider, the "prime" Peter Parker/Spider-Man, and several of their multiversal doppelgangers to stop Spider-Carnage.
  - Additionally, Spider-Carnage appears in "Spider-Wars", also voiced by Barnes. Hailing from the same alternate reality as the Scarlet Spider, the aforementioned clone went mad with jealousy upon learning of his true status and attempted to kill the Scarlet Spider before the Carnage symbiote emerged from an interdimensional portal, bonded to the clone, and turned him into Spider-Carnage. He nearly succeeds in destroying the multiverse, but the Beyonder and Madame Web work to stop him, as stated above. Eventually, the "prime" Parker finds a living version of Ben Parker, who convinces Spider-Carnage to stop, though the clone sacrifices himself to stop Carnage after failing to regain control from the symbiote.
- Ben Reilly as the Scarlet Spider appears in the fourth season of Ultimate Spider-Man, voiced by Scott Porter. This version sports Kaine Parker's facial scar, modern Scarlet Spider costume, and aggressive personality, and is a synthezoid created by Doctor Octopus using Peter Parker's DNA who possesses stingers under his arms. Throughout the season, he reluctantly works with the Web Warriors to stop Hydra and Doc Ock while hiding his allegiance with the latter. Additionally, Reilly receives his name from May Parker. Eventually, Reilly is revealed to be a mole within S.H.I.E.L.D. during the Sinister Six's attack on the Triskelion, but the Parkers appeal to his better nature, inspiring Reilly to betray his creator and fake his death while defeating the Sinister Six to work alone from the shadows. While investigating his origins however, he resurfaces and joins forces with Spider-Man to battle the imperfect synthezoid Kaine, during which Reilly learns the truth of his synthezoid origins and that he was intended to lead a team of synthezoid Spider-Slayers, which the Web Warriors eventually defeat. Sometime later, he becomes a teacher at the S.H.I.E.L.D. Academy.

=== Film ===
Ben Reilly as the Scarlet Spider appears in Spider-Man: Across the Spider-Verse, voiced by Andy Samberg. This version is a member of Miguel O'Hara's Spider-Society who serves as a parody of 1990s comic tropes and makes internal monologues. Director Joaquim Dos Santos confirmed their version of Reilly was "representing an era in comics. That's one of the key things with the character is that Ben Reilly was an era when super duper ripped characters were like the norm. Muscles on top of the muscles on top of muscles and being in positions that were not physically possible. And we were just like we really wanted to capture that."

=== Video games ===
- Ben Reilly as the Scarlet Spider and Spider-Man appear as alternate costumes for Peter Parker/Spider-Man in Spider-Man (2000) and Spider-Man 2: Enter Electro.
- Ben Reilly as Spider-Man and Spider-Carnage appear as alternate costumes for Peter Parker/Spider-Man in the Wii version of Spider-Man: Web of Shadows.
- Ben Reilly as the Scarlet Spider appears as an alternate costume for Peter Parker/Spider-Man in Marvel: Ultimate Alliance, Spider-Man: Shattered Dimensions, Ultimate Marvel vs. Capcom 3, Spider-Man: Edge of Time, Spider-Man (2018), and Spider-Man 2 (2023).
- Ben Reilly as Spider-Carnage appears as an unlockable alternate costume for Peter Parker/Spider-Man in The Amazing Spider-Man 2.
- Ben Reilly as the Scarlet Spider and Spider-Man appear as separate playable characters in Marvel Super Hero Squad Online, voiced by Chris Cox and Yuri Lowenthal respectively.
- Ben Reilly as the Scarlet Spider appears as a non-playable character in Lego Marvel Super Heroes.
- Ben Reilly as the Scarlet Spider, Spider-Man, and Spider-Carnage appear as separate playable characters in Spider-Man Unlimited.
- Ben Reilly as the Scarlet Spider appears as a playable character in Lego Marvel's Avengers via the Spider-Man DLC pack.
- Ben Reilly as the Scarlet Spider appears as a playable character in Lego Marvel Super Heroes 2.
- Ben Reilly as the Scarlet Spider appears as a playable character in Marvel Future Fight.
- Ben Reilly as the Scarlet Spider appears as a playable character in Marvel Strike Force.
- Ben Reilly as Chasm appears as an unlockable skin for Peter Parker/Spider-Man in Marvel Rivals and Marvel Tokon: Fighting Souls.

=== Merchandise ===
- 1996: Ben Reilly as the Scarlet Spider received an action figure in Toy Biz's "Marvel OverPower Card Game – PowerSurge Invincibles" toyline.
- 1996: Ben Reilly as Spider-Man received an action figure from Toy Biz.
- 1997: Ben Reilly as Spider-Carnage received an action figure in Toy Biz's Spider-Man/Venom – Along Came a Spider toyline.
- 2002: Ben Reilly as the Scarlet Spider received a KB Toys exclusive action figure in the Spider-Man Classics toyline.
- 2004: Ben Reilly as Spider-Man received an action figure in Toy Biz's Spider-Man Classics.
- 2004: Ben Reilly as Spider-Man received an action figure as part of a Kubrick/Medicom Toy five-pack.
- 2005: Ben Reilly as the Scarlet Spider received an action figure in Kubrick/Medicom Toy's Marvel Super-Heroes toyline.
- 2005: Ben Reilly as Spider-Man and Spider-Carnage received action figures from Minimates.
- 2007: Ben Reilly as the Scarlet Spider received a figure from Minimates as part of a two-pack with the Hobgoblin.
- 2008: Ben Reilly in his redesigned Spider-Man suit and designated as "Scarlet Spider" received an action figure in the Marvel Legends line via the Ares Build-A-Figure series.
- 2009–2010: Ben Reilly as the Scarlet Spider, designated as "Ben Reilly Spider-Man", and wearing a redesigned Spider-Man suit, received figures in the Super-Hero Squad line, with the first figure being released as part of a two-pack with Bullseye while the latter was released individually and as part of a two-pack with Carnage.
- 2016: Ben Reilly as Spider-Man and Spider-Carnage received figures in the Marvel Legends.
- 2018: Ben Reilly as the Scarlet Spider received a mini-figure in Lego's Spider-Man: Web Warriors Bridge Battle set.
- 2021: Ben Reilly as Spider-Man received an action figure in Medicom Toy's Mafex toyline.

== Collected editions ==
Title	Material collected	ISBN
Spider-Man: The Complete Ben Reilly Epic, Book 1	Spider-Man: The Parker Years, New Warriors (1990) #65–66, Scarlet Spider Unlimited #1, Web of Scarlet Spider #1–2, Amazing Scarlet Spider #1–2, Scarlet Spider #1–2, Spectacular Scarlet Spider #1–2, Green Goblin #3 and Sensational Spider-Man (1996) #0	978-0-7851-5545-4
Spider-Man: The Complete Ben Reilly Epic, Book 2	The Amazing Spider-Man (1962) #407–408, New Warriors (1990) #67, Sensational Spider-Man (1996) #1, Spectacular Spider-Man (1976) #230, Spider-Man (1990) #64–65, Spider-Man/Punisher: Family Plot #1–2, Web of Scarlet Spider #3–4, and material from Spider-Man Holiday Special and Venom: Along Came A Spider #1–4	978-0-7851-5612-3
Spider-Man: The Complete Ben Reilly Epic, Book 3	The Amazing Spider-Man (1962) #409–410, Sensational Spider-Man (1996) #2–3, Spectacular Spider-Man (1976) #231–233, Spider-Man (1990) #66–67, Spider-Man: The Final Adventure #1–4, Spider-Man Team-Up #2 and Spider-Man Unlimited (1993) #11	978-1-3024-9397-4
The Amazing Spider-Man: The Clone Conspiracy	The Amazing Spider-Man (vol. 4) #19–24, The Clone Conspiracy #1–5, The Clone Conspiracy Omega #1, Silk (vol. 2) #14–17, Prowler #1–5, and material from Free Comic Book Day 2016 (Captain America)	978-1-3029-0599-6
Ben Reilly: The Scarlet Spider Vol. 1: Back in the Hood	Ben Reilly: Scarlet Spider #1–5 and material from The Clone Conspiracy Omega #1	978-0-7851-9458-3
Ben Reilly: The Scarlet Spider Vol. 2: Death's Sting	Ben Reilly: Scarlet Spider #6–10, Slingers (1998) #0	978-0-7851-9459-0
Ben Reilly: The Scarlet Spider Vol. 3: Slingers Return	Ben Reilly: Scarlet Spider #10–14	978-1-3029-1115-7
Ben Reilly: The Scarlet Spider Vol. 4: Damnation	Ben Reilly: Scarlet Spider #15–19	978-1-3029-1116-4
Ben Reilly: The Scarlet Spider Vol. 5: Deal With the Devil	Ben Reilly: Scarlet Spider 20–25	978-1-3029-1504-9
The Amazing Spider-Man: Beyond	The Amazing Spider-Man (2018) #75–85, The Amazing Spider-Man (2018) #78.BEY & #80.BEY, and Free Comic Book Day 2021: Spider-Man/Venom #1	978-1-3029-3211-4
Chasm: Curse of Kaine	Chasm: Curse of Kaine #1–4 and Web of Spider-Man (2024) #1 (Chasm: Curse of Kaine story)	978-1-3029-5928-9
