= Jackal (Marvel Comics character) =

Fictional character in Marvel Comics

- The Jackal as he was originally depicted on the panel from The Amazing Spider-Man #146 (July 1975). Pencils by Ross Andru.

Publication information
- Publisher: Marvel Comics
- First appearance: Miles Warren: The Amazing Spider-Man #31 (December 1965); Jackal: The Amazing Spider-Man #129 (February 1974)
- Created by: Miles Warren: Stan Lee; Steve Ditko; Jackal: Gerry Conway; Ross Andru

In-story information
- Alter ego: Miles Warren
- Species: Human mutate
- Team affiliations: Empire State University
- Partnerships: Spidercide; Grizzly; Tarantula
- Notable aliases: Professor Warren; The Professor; The Man in Red; Professor Guarinus; Raymond Warren
- Abilities: Genius-level intellect; Superhuman strength, durability, speed, and agility; Expertise in martial arts and gymnastics

The Jackal is an alias used by two supervillains appearing in American comic books published by Marvel Comics, usually depicted as enemies of the superhero Spider-Man. The original and best known version, Miles Warren, was introduced in The Amazing Spider-Man #31 (December 1965) as a professor at the fictional Empire State University. Later storylines established him as also being a scientist researching genetics and biochemistry, and revealed an unhealthy romantic obsession he had developed for Gwen Stacy. Driven mad with jealousy and grief after Gwen's death, he creates the Jackal alter ego to seek revenge on Spider-Man, whom he holds responsible. To this end, he trains himself in martial arts and builds a green suit and gauntlets with claw-like razors. Although the Jackal initially did not possess any superpowers, he later gained enhanced strength, speed, and agility by mixing his genes with those of an actual jackal.

The Jackal was introduced in The Amazing Spider-Man #129 (February 1974), but his alter ego was not revealed until The Amazing Spider-Man #148 (September 1975). Originally one of Spider-Man's less popular rogues, the character rose to prominence after becoming one of the first in the Marvel Universe to master cloning technology and creating various clones of Spider-Man, like the Scarlet Spiders Ben Reilly and Kaine Parker, as well as of other characters, including himself and the chimera Spider-Girl. His experiments went on to play a major role in several popular Spider-Man storylines, such as the "Clone Saga" (1994–1996), "Spider-Island" (2011), and "Dead No More: The Clone Conspiracy" (2016–2017), the latter of which established Ben Reilly as the second Jackal.

In Spider-Gwen, during the titular character's foray into Earth-616, the Miles Warren version of Jackal attempts to capture her to explicitly sexually assault her, after previously only subtextually expressing this desire towards her main continuity counterpart and her clones.

Since his debut during the Silver Age of Comic Books, the character has been featured in several media adaptations of Spider-Man, including animated television series and video games. Various merchandise based on the character has also been produced.

== Publication history ==
The Jackal first appeared in The Amazing Spider-Man #129 (February 1974), and was created by writer Gerry Conway and artist Ross Andru. In The Amazing Spider-Man #148 (September 1975), the character's identity was revealed to be Professor Miles Warren, who had first appeared in The Amazing Spider-Man #31 (December 1965), and was created by writer Stan Lee and artist Steve Ditko. Prior to his reintroduction as the Jackal, his appearances were essentially limited to the occasional cameo in which he acts as simple background to Spider-Man's civilian life as a college student.

When named at all in these early appearances, the character is called only "Professor Warren". A "Mister Warren" had previously appeared in The Amazing Spider-Man #8 (January 1964), but he is a high school science teacher rather than a college professor, and is physically very distinct from Miles Warren. Despite this, Conway has said it was always his interpretation that "Mister Warren", "Professor Warren", and Professor Miles Warren/Jackal were the same character.

The Jackal was featured in the 1990s "Clone Saga" story arc, the 2011 storyline "Spider-Island", and the 2016–2017 storyline "Dead No More: The Clone Conspiracy". All of these story arcs involve cloning, which the character became most famously associated with.

== Fictional character biography ==
Miles Warren is a professor of biology at Empire State University (ESU), where he meets Peter Parker and Gwen Stacy. During his tenure there, Warren becomes secretly infatuated with the much younger Gwen to the point of obsession and jealousy of Parker. After Gwen is murdered by the Green Goblin, Warren swears vengeance on Spider-Man, since it was reported that it was Spider-Man who had killed Gwen. Gwen's death drives Warren into depression, despair, and insanity as a mad geneticist who eventually turns into the Jackal. Miles is also the brother of science teacher Raymond Warren of Midtown High School.

=== Early career ===
Warren works as an assistant of the High Evolutionary at Mount Wundagore after earning his Ph.D. in biochemistry. He assists the High Evolutionary in experiments that involve turning animals into humanoid forms and vice versa. There is conflict between Warren and the High Evolutionary because Warren succeeds in creating humanoid animals called New Men, whereas the High Evolutionary is not able to. Eventually, Warren evolves a jackal that exhibits a Jekyll and Hyde personality. When the test subject escapes, the High Evolutionary banishes Warren from Wundagore. Warren continues his research and eventually settles down with Monica. Warren and Monica's two children are killed by the Man-Jackal, who was envious of his creator.

=== The Jackal's origin ===
The day after Gwen's death, Warren's lab assistant Anthony Serba reveals that he successfully cloned a frog using their research technology. Warren gives Serba tissue samples of Gwen and Peter, telling Serba that they come from rat cells. Serba later confronts Warren, stating that the clones are human and must be destroyed immediately. Panicking, Warren attempts to cover Serba's mouth to shut him up, accidentally suffocating Serba. Unable to accept responsibility for his actions, Warren develops the Jackal persona to carry the weight of his misdeeds. He further develops his alter ego by fashioning a green suit and gauntlets with sharp, claw-like razors on each finger, and by training himself athletically. During this time, he also continues to experiment with cloning humans.

Jackal's hatred for Spider-Man manifests in his belief that Spider-Man is solely responsible for allowing Gwen, whom he loved, to die at the Goblin's hands. He starts harassing Spider-Man, setting him up against other adversaries. Out of his numerous attempts to create clones of Peter, only one is a perfect copy of the original. He also creates two clones of himself, one a direct copy and the other a modified clone harboring the Carrion virus. Jackal helps the Tarantula escape prison, and the two become partners. Jackal captures Spider-Man, but lets him go after proving that Spider-Man is no match for Jackal in a fair fight. He then lures his nemesis to Shea Stadium and manipulates into battling his perfect clone of Peter by binding Ned Leeds to a bomb that only the original Spider-Man can disarm. But when a clone of Gwen tears off Jackal's mask and confronts him on his crimes, Warren accepts responsibility for his actions. He attempts to correct his wrongdoings by freeing Leeds, only to be caught in the bomb's explosion.

=== Clone Saga ===
The Jackal as he appeared throughout the "Clone Saga". Interior art of Spider-Man: The Jackal Files #1 (August 1994). Art by Dan Lawlis.

During the "Clone Saga", it is revealed that Peter's clone had survived the explosion and gone into hiding under the alias of Ben Reilly. The Jackal who died at Shea Stadium was also a clone. Nearly five years later, another clone of Jackal would marry Gwen's original clone, and the two would live under the assumed names Warren Miles and Gwen Miles. This clone of Warren eventually dies of the degeneration that afflicts most of Jackal's clones. The real Jackal resurfaces, where his experiments mutate his own DNA and give him an actual jackal's attributes.

When Ben Reilly returns years later to New York City as the Scarlet Spider and allies with Spider-Man, Jackal also returns to unleash his clone army and convinced both Peter and Ben that the latter was the original Spider-Man, and the former was the clone. Jackal creates clones of Peter who come into conflict with Spider-Man, the Scarlet Spider, and Kaine. Jackal also created diminutive clones of Spider-Man called Jacks that are similar to his creation Jack. Jackal, in the process of attempting to kill and replace millions of people with clones that he can control, falls off a tall building while trying to save Gwen's clone and dies. This would later be revealed to be a clone of Jackal.

=== Spider-Island ===
Jackal returns in the "Spider-Island" storyline, being further genetically altered to the point where he frequently displays animalistic tendencies. His body is always cold, requiring him to wear a thick coat even in hot weather. He is now a crime lord calling himself "The Professor", and allies himself with Hammerhead, but the two eventually go to jail. Jackal returns in the "Infestation" back-up feature of The Amazing Spider-Man, unleashing an airborne virus to pass on Spider-like abilities to thousands of citizens in Manhattan. He achieves this through the aid of human clones of himself, and funding from Adriana Soria. After Mister Fantastic creates a clone for the virus using Anti-Venom's antibodies, Jackal assures Soria that no cure is possible. Soria kills Jackal, who is revealed to be a clone.

It is later revealed that Jackal has been monitoring Peter's accidental creation of Alpha, and has set his sights on Spider-Man's new protégé. Jackal resurfaces accompanied by clones of Spider-Queen and is bent on harvesting Alpha's powers for himself. His plans fail as the Alpha energy cannot be cloned, resulting in powerless, near-mindless copies of Alpha. All of Alpha's clones are destroyed when the original Alpha breaks free.

=== Dead No More: The Clone Conspiracy ===
Ben Reilly's remains are collected by Jackal, who resurrects him through a new cloning process. However, Jackal finds that Ben's body is still unstable and has him killed and resurrected 26 more times. The ordeal of repeated death caused Ben to become mentally unbalanced and morally ambiguous, due to the trauma and very soul being damaged from being removed and replaced over and over. Ben eventually breaks free and knocks out Jackal. After improving Jackal's formula, Ben makes clones of Jackal and convinces the original Jackal that he is a clone. Ben assumes the Jackal name during the "Dead No More: The Clone Conspiracy" storyline, where he resurrects many of Spider-Man's friends and enemies.

When Spider-Man activates the Webware to stabilize the remaining clones, the clones of Jackal die. The original Jackal realizes that he has been tricked into believing that he was a clone and vows revenge on Ben.

== Powers and abilities ==
Miles Warren is a skilled biochemist and geneticist with expertise in cloning, as well as a trained martial artist and gymnast. He later genetically spliced his DNA with that of a jackal, granting him superhuman strength, durability, speed, and agility.

== Reception ==
J. M. DeMatteis, the creator of the "Clone Saga", claimed in an interview that he thought Jackal is "a terrific villain...one of his favorites", and that it "was a blast bringing the character back, if only for this one story." Dan Slott claimed in an interview with Newsarama about the "Spider-Island" saga that the Jackal is "one of the wonderful mad scientists of Spider-Man's world."

In 2014, IGN ranked the Jackal as Spider-Man's 17th greatest enemy.

== Other versions ==
=== Marvel Zombies ===
A zombified alternate universe version of Jackal appears in Marvel Zombies. He creates human clones to feed the remaining zombies, utilizing Inhuman technology to do so.

=== Spider-Man: Clone Saga ===
Jackal appears in the re-imagining of the Clone Saga by Tom DeFalco, which explores the storyline as it was originally conceived. He infects both May Parker and Mary Jane Watson with a genetic virus. When Kaine betrays Jackal and leads Spider-Man and Scarlet Spider to his lair, all three are captured. The Jackal then reveals his plan to create an army of Spider-Clones to take over the world and clone Gwen Stacy. The clones prove unstable, however, and the Jackal comes to the conclusion that Ben is the original. Before he can do anything, Kaine breaks free and burns his mark onto the Jackal's face before breaking his neck.

=== Ultimate Marvel ===
An alternate universe version of Miles Warren appears in the Ultimate Marvel imprint. This version is a hypnotherapist.

=== Spider-Man: Life Story ===
An alternate universe version of Miles Warren appears in Spider-Man: Life Story. This version is a former professor at Empire State University who founded his own bio-engineering company, with Gwen Stacy as his chief biologist.

=== Spider-Verse ===
An alternate universe version of Miles Warren from Earth-802 appears in Spider-Verse. This version works for Jennix of the Inheritors.

=== Secret Wars ===
An alternate universe version of Jackal from the Battleworld domain of Arachnia appears in Secret Wars.

=== What If? ===
In "What If The Punisher Had Killed Spider-Man?", Warren successfully dupes the Punisher into killing Spider-Man and abandons him to take the fall in his place. Becoming a hunted fugitive, the Punisher eventually tracks Warren down and intends to surrender him to the police. The Punisher ends up killing Jackal after being confronted by the NYPD.

=== Dead No More: The Clone Conspiracy ===
When Warren reveals his plans for New U, Kaine and the Gwen Stacy of Earth-65 step in to stop him from winning Peter to his side. Kaine later told Spider-Man that they have visited various unidentified alternate universes where Ben Reilly agreed to Jackal's plans for New U Technologies, resulting in the Carrion virus devastating Earth.

== In other media ==
=== Television ===
- Miles Warren appears in the Spider-Man: The Animated Series episode "The Return of Hydro-Man", voiced by Jonathan Harris. This version is a scientist whose cloning experiments were banned by the government. In an attempt to stabilize his clones, he uses a sample of Hydro-Man to create clones of the latter and Mary Jane Watson before being discovered by Spider-Man, and his clones evaporate.
  - An alternate universe version of Warren appears in the episode "I Really, Really Hate Clones", in which he captures and clones Spider-Man and tampers with both versions' memories, with one becoming the Scarlet Spider and the other later turning into Spider-Carnage.
- Miles Warren appears in The Spectacular Spider-Man, voiced by Brian George. This version is East Indian and works at Empire State University with a grant from Norman Osborn. After obtaining evidence of Curt Connors' mutation into the Lizard, he uses it to blackmail Connors into surrendering control of his lab to him.
- An original version of the Jackal, Raymond Warren, appears in Spider-Man (2017), voiced by John DiMaggio. This version mixed his DNA with that of his namesake and has mastered cloning technology, creating numerous clones of himself in case he is exposed or caught.

=== Video games ===
The Jackal appears as a boss in the PS2 and PSP versions of Spider-Man: Web of Shadows, voiced by Greg Baldwin.
