= Scarlet Spider =

Marvel Comics character

- The four versions of the Scarlet Spider in the main Marvel Universe. Counter-clockwise from top left: Ben Reilly as the Scarlet Spider on the cover of Web of Scarlet Spider #1, art by Steven Butler; Joe Wade as the evil cybernetic Scarlet Spider, art by Paris Karounos; Red Team Scarlet Spiders on the cover of Avengers: The Initiative #7, art by Stefano Caselli Kaine Parker as the Scarlet Spider on the variant cover of Scarlet Spider vol. 2 #1 art by Mark Bagley

Publication information
- Publisher: Marvel Comics

The Scarlet Spider is an alias used by several fictional characters appearing in American comic books published by Marvel Comics, most notably Ben Reilly and Kaine Parker, both of whom are genetic clones of Peter Parker, the superhero Spider-Man. His main costume is similar to Spider-Man's consisting of a red spandex bodysuit and mask complemented by a blue sleeveless hoodie sweatshirt adorned with a large spider symbol on both sides, along with a utility belt and bulkier web-shooters around his wrists. In the MC2 continuity, Felicity Hardy (daughter of Felicia Hardy/Black Cat) becomes the new Scarlet Spider.

The Ben Reilly, Felicity Hardy, and Kaine Parker incarnations of Scarlet Spider made their cinematic debut in the animated film Spider-Man: Across the Spider-Verse, with the former voiced by Andy Samberg while the latter two have no dialogue.

== Fictional character biography ==
=== Ben Reilly ===
Benjamin "Ben" Reilly, a clone of the original Spider-Man created by the Jackal, is the first major version of the Scarlet Spider.

=== Peter Parker ===
To continue his superhero activities, Peter Parker was forced to use the Scarlet Spider identity due to all of his Spider-Man costumes being ruined, while Ben Reilly pretended to be the former in prison.

=== Joe Wade ===
Joseph "Joe" Wade is the only character to operate as a villain under the Scarlet Spider alias. An undercover FBI agent, he was assigned to investigate the second Doctor Octopus. Doctor Octopus discovers Joe and traps his body in a virtual reality chamber before using his thoughts to power a hard-light holographic duplicate of the Scarlet Spider to tarnish his name. Despite this, Joe is unable to stop himself from committing acts of violence. The true Scarlet Spider (Ben Reilly) attacks Doctor Octopus' lair, damaging the machine while Joe is still inside. This turned Joe into a mechanized version of the Scarlet Spider with superhuman strength and speed, claws on his fingertips, the ability to fire webbing from his wrists, crawl up walls, and fire laser "stingers" from his eyes. After the imposter goes on a rampage, the second Spider-Man (Ben Reilly) joins forces with the New Warriors to stop the cybernetic Scarlet Spider before the FBI put him in custody so Joe can undergo medical treatment to remove the technology.

=== Scarlet Spiders (Red Team) ===
The Scarlet Spiders, secretly all clones of Michael Van Patrick, named Michael, Van, and Patrick, work with the Initiative and wear advanced versions of the Iron Spider armour.

=== Kaine Parker ===
Kaine Parker, a clone of the original Spider-Man also created by the Jackal, is the fifth major version of the Scarlet Spider.

== Other versions ==
=== MC2 ===
Felicity Hardy as the Scarlet Spider. Art by Pat Olliffe.

In the alternate future MC2, Felicity Hardy, the daughter of Felicia Hardy and purportedly Flash Thompson, adopts the Scarlet Spider identity both to irritate her mother, and because she suspects Peter Parker may be her real father. She attempts to convince her possible half-sister Spider-Girl to take her on as a sidekick, but the latter refuses. Undeterred, she continues to fight crime until several near-death experiences cause her to give up the identity. Although she has no actual powers, she is skilled in martial arts and gymnastics and utilizes an array of spider-themed weaponry.

=== Spider-Gwen ===
The Spider-Gwen universe's Mary Jane Watson dresses as the Scarlet Spider for Halloween.

== In other media ==
=== Television ===
- The Ben Reilly incarnation of the Scarlet Spider makes a cameo appearance in the X-Men: The Animated Series episode "One Man's Worth".
- The Ben Reilly incarnation of the Scarlet Spider makes a cameo appearance in the Fantastic Four episode "Nightmare in Green".
- The Ben Reilly incarnation of the Scarlet Spider appears in the Spider-Man: The Animated Series episode "Spider-Wars", voiced by Christopher Daniel Barnes.
- Joe Wade makes a non-speaking cameo appearance in The Spectacular Spider-Man episode "Shear Strength" as an African-American FBI agent.
- The Ben Reilly incarnation of the Scarlet Spider, hybridized with Kaine Parker, appears in Ultimate Spider-Man, voiced by Scott Porter. Additionally, the original Scarlet Spider costume appears as Flash Thompson's initial superhero identity.
- The original Scarlet Spider costume appears in Marvel's Spider-Man (2017) as Peter Parker / Spider-Man's homemade costume.

=== Film ===
- Peter Parker's homemade Spider-Man suit from the Marvel Cinematic Universe (MCU) films Captain America: Civil War (2016) and Spider-Man: Homecoming (2017) pays homage to the original Scarlet Spider.
- The Ben Reilly, Felicity Hardy, and Kaine Parker incarnations of Scarlet Spider appear in Spider-Man: Across the Spider-Verse, with Reilly voiced by Andy Samberg while Hardy and Kaine have no dialogue.

=== Video games ===
- The Ben Reilly incarnation of the Scarlet Spider appears as an alternate skin for Peter Parker / Spider-Man in Spider-Man (2000), Spider-Man 2: Enter Electro, Marvel: Ultimate Alliance, Spider-Man: Shattered Dimensions, Ultimate Marvel vs. Capcom 3, and Spider-Man: Edge of Time.
- The Ben Reilly incarnation of the Scarlet Spider appears as a playable character in Marvel Super Hero Squad Online, voiced by Chris Cox.
- The Kaine Parker incarnation of the Scarlet Spider appears as an alternate skin for Peter Parker / Spider-Man in The Amazing Spider-Man and The Amazing Spider-Man 2 film tie-in games.
- The Ben Reilly, Kaine Parker, Joe Wade, and Felicity Hardy incarnations of the Scarlet Spider appear as playable characters in Spider-Man Unlimited.
- The Ben Reilly incarnation of the Scarlet Spider appears as a playable character in Lego Marvel Super Heroes 2, Marvel Future Fight, and Marvel Strike Force.
- The Ben Reilly and Kaine Parker incarnations of the Scarlet Spider appear as alternate skins for Peter Parker / Spider-Man in Spider-Man (2018), Spider-Man 2 (2023).

== See also ==
- The Amazing Scarlet Spider
- Scarlet Spider (volumes 1 and 2 of the series)
- The Spectacular Scarlet Spider
- Web of Scarlet Spider
