= Clone Saga =

Marvel Comics storyline

- Cover to Web of Spider-Man #117 (October 1994) which officially launched the 1990s "Clone Saga".
- Publisher: Marvel Comics
- Publication date: October 1994 – December 1996
- Genre: Superhero
Title(s)
The Amazing Spider-Man #139-151, 391–418, 435, Annual '96, Super Special #1
The Sensational Spider-Man #0–11, Wizard mini-comic #3
The Spectacular Spider-Man #25–31, 142–143, 149, 162–163, Annual #8, 215–240, Super Special #1
Spider-Man #48-75, Super Special #1
Spider-Man Unlimited #7–14
Web of Spider-Man #117–129, Super Special #1
- Main character(s): Spider-Man; Ben Reilly; Jackal

Creative team
- Writer(s): Terry Kavanagh; Joey Cavalieri; Todd Dezago; J. M. DeMatteis; Tom DeFalco

The "Clone Saga" is an extended comic book storyline published by Marvel Comics, revolving around the superhero Spider-Man and clones of him, as well as of other characters. The second and best-known story arc of this name ran from October 1994 to December 1996, and quickly became one of the character's most controversial stories. Although it was intended to wrap up in less than a year, the comics sold very well and the writers were encouraged to prolong the saga as long as possible. This led to some changes to the storyline that ultimately proved divisive. Despite the controversy, the 1990s Clone Saga remains one of the most popular Spider-Man story arcs.

Although many people were involved in its creation, the Clone Saga is most closely associated with Terry Kavanagh, who proposed the idea; Howard Mackie, who worked on the majority of the smaller crossovers involved in the overall story arc; and Gerry Conway, who devised the original story. Executive editors on the storyline included Tom DeFalco, Bob Budiansky, and Bob Harras.

== Story arcs ==
There were two "Clone Sagas": the original storyline in the 1970s and the second saga which consumed all the regular Spider-Man series, several limited series and one-shot issues between 1994 and 1997. Between the two, there were also two smaller storylines that dealt with elements from the original saga.

=== The original Clone Saga ===
Cover to Amazing Spider-Man #149 (October 1975). Cover pencil art by Gil Kane, interior pencil art by Ross Andru.

In mid-1973, writer Gerry Conway made the decision to kill off the girlfriend of Peter Parker, Gwen Stacy, in The Amazing Spider-Man #121 because the editorial team felt that Gwen had become stale as a character and they wanted to instill an additional element of tragedy into Peter Parker's life. In the follow-up arcs, Conway introduced a new villain called the Jackal and let Gwen Stacy seemingly return from the dead.

The Jackal was the villain identity of Gwen and Peter's biology professor Miles Warren, who could not cope with the death of Gwen, with whom he had a secret infatuation. As an expert on cloning, he creates clones of both Gwen and Peter, discovering Peter is Spider-Man as a result. The Jackal blames Spider-Man for Gwen's death and wants to kill him. The Jackal kidnaps Spider-Man and forces him to fight his clone. Both men believe they are the real Peter Parker. The two Spider-Men soon decide to work together, but one is seemingly killed by the same bomb that kills the Jackal. The surviving Spider-Man determines he is the original because he is in love with Mary Jane Watson, which did not happen until after Warren created the clone. Spider-Man drops the body of the clone into an incinerator. Gwen Stacy's clone disappears to find a new life for herself.

The Amazing Spider-Man #149, the climactic installment of the original Clone Saga, leaves it ambiguous whether it is the original Spider-Man or his clone who perishes in the bomb explosion. Conway said this ambiguity was unintentional, as at the time he took it as a given that Marvel would never replace the star of The Amazing Spider-Man with a clone.

=== Clone stories in the interim between the Clone Sagas ===
A few years later, Spider-Man encountered Carrion, who claimed to be a degenerated clone of Warren.

The clone of Gwen Stacy reappeared many years later when she was being pursued by the High Evolutionary, who was determined to discover how Warren had been able to perfect cloning. In the process, he discovered that Warren had not, but had instead created a genetic virus which transformed already living beings into supposed clones of other people. It was claimed that the Gwen clone was really a woman named Joyce Delany who was seemingly cured of the virus and left to lead her own life once more. Later, Spider-Man investigated Warren's old laboratory and discovered that Carrion was another former student of Warren's, Malcolm McBride, who was infected with the virus and became the new Carrion. Many years after that in Scarlet Spider Unlimited #1, this story arc was molded to fit into the New Clone Saga.

=== The second Clone Saga ===
More years passed before Spider-Man's clone reappeared. He had survived the battle and for five years had lived an existence under the name Ben Reilly (a combination of Peter's Uncle Ben's first name and Aunt May's maiden name), and develops a superhero identity of his own as the Scarlet Spider after returning to New York City. A series of chaotic events followed, in which Peter and Ben were plagued by both a resurrected Jackal and by Kaine, who was an unsuccessful first clone of Spider-Man. In the process, another clone of Spider-Man became the villain Spidercide. Matters were further confused by the interventions of the mysterious and seemingly all-powerful Judas Traveller, a psychiatrist and Scrier, later revealed to be a cabal.

The revelations made by the High Evolutionary were revealed to have been inaccurate, driven by a determination to discredit Warren, who had formerly worked with him.

Medical tests indicated Peter was actually the clone and Ben the original. Peter temporarily retired as Spider-Man, leaving the mantle of Spider-Man to Ben while he prepared for his new role as a father after the discovery that Mary Jane was pregnant; Peter even lost his powers for a time during his 'retirement', although they eventually came back after a near-death experience. The climax revealed that Peter, Ben, the Jackal, Judas Traveller and many others had all been manipulated for years by Norman Osborn, who had returned from the dead. Osborn said Peter was the original—having faked the evidence that revealed Peter's status as the clone as part of a plan to break Peter's spirit—a claim that was confirmed when Ben died saving Peter's life and his body degenerated like any other clone.

==== Selected bibliography ====
During the mid-1990s, Marvel consistently published four monthly Spider-Man series, roughly one every week. For the most part, the Spider-titles were treated during this storyline as a single weekly series, although occasionally they would separate, pair off, or have special anniversary editions. The Clone Saga ran through all four titles from October 1994 to December 1996, in addition to a multitude of spin-offs, one-shots, and ancillary issues. The relevant issues are:

Ongoing series:

- Web of Spider-Man #117–124, Super Special #1, #125–129
- Web of Scarlet Spider #1–4
- The Sensational Spider-Man #0–11, Wizard mini-comic #3
- The Amazing Spider-Man #139–151, 391–401, Super Special #1, #402–416, Annual '96 #1, #417–418, 435
- The Amazing Scarlet Spider #1–2
- Spider-Man #48–58, Super Special #1, 59–63, Holiday Special #1, 64–75
- Scarlet Spider #1–2
- The Spectacular Spider-Man #25–31, 142–143, Annual #08, #149, 162–163, 215–224, Super Special #1, #225–241
- The Spectacular Scarlet Spider #1–2
- Spider-Man Unlimited #7–14
- Scarlet Spider Unlimited #1
- Venom Super Special #1
- Giant-Size Spider-Man #5
- The New Warriors #61–62, 65–67
- Spider-Man Team-Up #1–5
- Green Goblin #1, 3, 10, 13
- Daredevil #354
- Backlash/Spider-Man #1–2
- Marvel Fanfare #3

Furthermore, all five titles were temporarily renamed with "Scarlet Spider" in place of "Spider-Man" for two months, in imitation of the X-Men's "Age of Apocalypse" story arc, with Web of Scarlet Spider continuing for an additional two months after the other titles returned.

Special one-shot issues and miniseries:

- Spider-Man: Maximum Clonage Alpha #1
- Spider-Man: Maximum Clonage Omega #1
- Spider-Man: The Lost Years #1–3, 0
- Spider-Man: The Final Adventure #1–4
- Spider-Man: The Osborn Journal #1
- Spider-Man: The Parker Years #1
- Spider-Man: Redemption #1–4
- Spider-Man: The Jackal Files #1
- Spider-Man: The Clone Journal #1
- Spider-Man: Funeral for an Octopus #1–3
- Venom: Along Came a Spider #1–4
- Spider-Man/Punisher: Family Plot #1–2
- Spider-Man: Dead Man's Hand #1
- Spider-Man: 101 Ways to End the Clone Saga #1
- X-Men/Spider-Man #3
- What If? #30, 86

=== The third Clone Saga ===
A third Clone Saga was published in mid-2021, starring Miles Morales instead of Peter Parker. The story arc ran from Miles Morales: Spider-Man issue #25 to #28, after being previously foreshadowed in issue #24, where Miles was kidnapped by a mysterious villain known as Assessor to be used as a test subject for his cloning experiments.

Assessor ends up creating three clones of Miles: Selim (a ruthless leader who wields a pair of daggers and appears identical to Miles, but changes his hairstyle to differentiate himself from him), Mindspinner (a deformed clone with six spider-like arms and six eyes with which he can disrupt people's minds, and who speaks in limited sentences), and Shift (a shape-shifting clone who not only also has Miles' default looks, but also inherited part of Miles' goodness). Miles eventually convinces Shift to reform and turn on his brothers, later inspiring Mindspinner to do the same. Left to fight Miles alone, Selim creates a massive Venom Blast that kills him, as well as Mindspinner, leaving Shift as the only surviving clone.

During the "Beyond" storyline, it is revealed that the cloning of Miles was actually a set-up by the Beyond Corporation, the same company who made Ben Reilly's new Spider-Man suit, contracting the Slingers to work for them, imprisoning one of Spider-Man's former and current rogues, hiring supervillains, and attempting to kill Peter Parker, Miles, and Ben should the latter defect from the company.

== Production and development ==
=== Conception ===
The second Clone Saga sprang from Marvel Comics's determination to produce a strong Spider-Man "event" story that would rival DC Comics' "The Death of Superman" and "Batman: Knightfall," both of which sold extremely well. Spider-Man editor Mark Bernardo said "Marching orders we were given by upper management to come up with something similar in scope to DC's "Death of Superman" storyline, which at the time was breaking sales records left and right. Thus, no outrageous idea was out of bounds. Terry Kavanagh was cajoled into blurting out his clone idea, which first met with groans and indifference, until someone (to my recollection, J.M. DeMatteis) suddenly realized the radical possibilities of such a storyline." Several of the Spider-Man creators believed that the character had drifted too far from his original portrayal and sought a way to restore the Spider-Man of old, in particular jettisoning his marriage to Mary Jane. Howard Mackie revealed "When the story was begun we knew it would be controversial, and that was part of the point." He also commented "The return to the single Spider-Man did enter the conversation eventually, but it was not the intent of the story when pitched."

Bernardo added that the length of the arc was initially planned to be short. "The whole arc was supposed to end in Amazing Spider-Man #400, and leave 'Ben Reilly' as the one and only 'original Peter Parker' and forge a new beginning," he noted, adding that the whole storyline was supposed to bring Spider-Man back to basics.

Eventually, editor-in-chief Tom DeFalco gave the final approval to begin the story.

=== Establishing the clone ===
Although the readers had been getting clues about a mysterious figure with links to Peter Parker in the issues leading up to the story, the starting point for the second Clone Saga was the end of Spectacular Spider-Man #216 (September 1994), written by Tom DeFalco and Todd Dezago, in which Spider-Man was confronted by an exact look-alike of himself.

In the following issues, the writers established the clone's backstory as a frightened, homeless outcast; and introduced the character Judas Traveller. The writers set up the possibility that the clone could be the real Spider-Man. The clone was then further developed editorially, and given the name Ben Reilly. Additionally, he became known as the superhero the Scarlet Spider, complete with a unique costume.

=== Early development trouble ===
According to established Spider-Man assistant editor Glenn Greenberg, "No one—not the writers, not the editors—seemed to know who or what the hell Judas Traveller was. He was seemingly this immensely powerful, quasi-mystical being with amazing abilities, but what was the real deal with him? ... But to be honest, a character like Traveller didn't really fit into Spider-Man's world." As such, Traveller's role would remain a mystery to readers for a while, as writers dropped him in and out of the saga.

Tom DeFalco came up with the idea of making Spider-Man's wife Mary Jane pregnant, feeling it would be a dramatic event that would help set up the saga's ultimate resolution. But a few months into the arc a large scale reorganization at Marvel removed DeFalco as editor-in-chief, and Marvel's comic line was broken into five separate groups each with its own editor-in-chief. Bob Budiansky became editor-in-chief on the Spider-Man line.

By then, the writers had established a new villain, Kaine. To prove that he was dangerous, the writers had him killing classic Spider-Man foes, including Doctor Octopus, with his corpse shown to rule out any possibility that he would return. However, Kaine soon became another reoccurring character of unexplained origin and purpose, like Judas Traveller and the Scrier, whose roles would not be revealed for quite some time.

Then, the creative staff brought back the Jackal, the original culprit of the clones. He was used as a plot device to explain the "clone degeneration" and also set up the possibility he was part of a greater plan by Judas Traveller and Scrier. In this plot developed by J.M. DeMatteis, and part written by Todd DeZago and Howard Mackie, Jackal gave readers doubt and suspicion by stating that Peter was the clone, followed by a reverse statement, and then assessing them as both being clones of an original; because of this, the story was considered convoluted. In a 2008 interview, Glenn Greenberg recalled "It only made sense, from a dramatic standpoint. It was this story that kicked off what would become an increasingly tiresome stream of clones, lies upon lies, fake-outs, and convoluted twists and turns."

At this point, the creative staff, seemingly without strict direction, inserted a lot of open plot points waiting to be resolved, such as Ben Reilly worrying about "degeneration" of his body due to cloning, why Kaine was protecting Spider-Man but preying on Ben Reilly, why Ben and Spider-Man shared dreams, why Kaine was foreseeing Mary Jane's death, who the mysterious new character Seward Trainer was as well as the identity of the "Third Peter Parker", a.k.a. Spidercide.

With a plethora of writers and editors, the storyline was initiated throughout all the regular Spider-Man series, but slowly grew out of control. The sales department requested extensions to the storyline, buoyed up by very strong sales on the book at a time when most other comics were experiencing a noticeable decline. With this extension, the storyline outlived several key creative staff and many decisions on the eventual direction of the storyline were changed.

With Amazing Spider-Man #400, in a controversial decision, the writers killed off Spider-Man's aunt May Parker, a major supporting character since 1962. The "Mark of Kaine" arc added still more clones of Spider-Man. With this arc, the sales of the Spider-Man comics skyrocketed, and therefore, the writers were encouraged to keep the saga going even longer.

=== Establishing Ben Reilly as Spider-Man ===
At the conclusion of the story arc "The Trial of Peter Parker" in Spectacular Spider-Man #226, Peter is revealed by Dr. Seward Trainer as the clone of Ben. Peter retired as Spider-Man based on this premise and moved to Portland to live with Mary Jane, allowing Ben to take over as Spider-Man.

Goletz said that the next chapter in the saga was to "begin the new era of Spider-Man. Peter and Mary Jane would be written out of the books, and sent off to live in peace with their soon-to-be-born child. Ben would get the chance to establish himself as Spider-Man and move forward. Going into the planning stages for what would turn out to be 'Maximum Clonage', the intent was indeed to finish up the clone story line once and for all and quickly get Ben started as Spider-Man." Also, the Gwen Stacy clone who had started the whole Clone Saga in the 1970s was to be killed to provide a fitting end. But impressed by the "Age of Apocalypse" crossover of sister Marvel Comics title X-Men, in which huge sales were achieved by long, spread-out story lines, Bob Budiansky ordered to duplicate this recipe for the "Maximum Clonage" project. Instead of tying up loose ends, the story was changed in such a way that practically every issue brought up new clones. Instead of being killed, the Gwen Stacy clone was allowed to slip away unnoticed.

Following the end of "Maximum Clonage", the creative staff launched revamps of established villains (such as a new female Doctor Octopus), without much success. DeMatteis resigned out of creative weariness with the saga's repeated extensions, later likening the work to "writing chapter two of a multi-part story month after month". Greenberg recalled: "The idea was to have each Spider-Man book retitled so that the Scarlet Spider's name would replace Spider-Man's—Amazing Scarlet Spider, Spectacular Scarlet Spider, Ben Reilly Scarlet Spider, and Web of Scarlet Spider. We'd get four new number #1's out of it, and it would be a way to capitalize on the Scarlet Spider's popularity one last time before he became (the new) Spider-Man. What that meant was holding off Ben's debut as Spider-Man even longer." Though Budiansky and the rest of the editorial staff wanted the retitling to be a one-off for each series, the Scarlet Spider was popular enough for Marvel's sales and marketing to insist on four issues of each title. Ultimately, they compromised on two issues of each title.

=== Change of heart ===
In the story "Return of Spider-Man", opening in the newest series Sensational Spider-Man #0, Ben finds a new Spider-Man suit and develops a life of his own. More efforts were taken to solidify Ben as the new Spider-Man, such as establishing a supporting cast for Ben. However, there were many staff that had a hard time accepting Ben as Peter's replacement, such as the new writer of Sensational, Dan Jurgens. Jurgens wanted to work on the Peter Parker version of the character, and was disappointed to have Ben instead, and so he made a plea to Budiansky to bring back Parker, arguing that Ben confused new readers, and was a disappointment to long-time readers who had grown to love Parker. Budiansky was sold on the idea.

The Spider-Man: The Final Adventure limited series was originally intended to end with the birth of Peter Parker and Mary Jane Watson's baby, and finally leave Ben Reilly as the sole focal point of the franchise. But Budiansky was now set on reinstating Peter Parker as Spider-Man, and felt that it would be implausible for him to resume that role if he were a father. So that the series would still have the appearance of a major impact, writer Fabian Nicieza replaced the baby's birth with the removal of Parker's powers, done in such a way that the writers of the regular titles could quickly reinstate them.

The task of actually re-establishing Parker as the true Spider-Man without it seeming like a cop-out was daunting enough that Budiansky invited the whole of Marvel's staff to offer ideas. Greenberg recalled "I think even the janitor and the mail room guys weighed in at one point. It got a little out of hand, to put it mildly... the memos really started coming in at this point, fast and furious... and I've still got every single one of them, in one big, thick, hernia-inducing file." To provoke new interest from the readers, the storyline "Return of Kaine" introduced a skeleton that was discovered in the original clone saga lab wearing a Spider-Man suit; however, none of the writers or editorial staff had a theory of what the skeleton's significance was.

At this time, Greenberg recalled, the plan for the Clone Saga was: "A mysterious figure was intended to be the sole mastermind behind the entire Clone Saga, a powerful and influential figure who was controlling Seward Trainer and manipulating the lives of Peter Parker and Ben Reilly from the shadows. Forced to wear an environmental suit to maintain his life functions, he would eventually be restored to health by Seward, and at that point, we would reveal his identity." However, in July 1995 Tom Brevoort proposed a story in which Ben Reilly is sent five years back in time (to the end of the original Clone Saga) by the Scrier, as part of a contest between himself and Judas Traveller. The Scrier would be revealed as Mephisto, who would appear at the end of the "time loop" to give Ben the option of saving Peter's life in place of his own. This would eliminate the idea that either Ben or Peter was a clone, instead asserting that Ben was Peter from five years in the future, sent back by Mephisto to co-exist with the current Peter. The Jackal would be responsible for convincing the Peter that was sent back in time that he was a clone, thus taking on the identity of Ben. The major selling point to this plan was that it would restore the memories of Ben (who was really Peter all along) and thus hopefully satisfy long-time readers. Budiansky and Greenberg fleshed out the storyline with plans for publication in April 1996.

=== Creative stalemate ===
While the "Time Loop" idea had won the approval of the editorial staff, the writers unanimously refused to adopt it, with the minimal role of Spider-Man himself in the storyline being the most troubling issue. The writers proposed alternative solutions, but none of them attained editorial approval the way the "Time Loop" idea had. As a result, the Spider-Man group was unable to proceed with any conclusion to the saga, despite agreement among both writers and editors that it should end as soon as possible. Greenberg recalls that "Budiansky was mired in indecision, and it was hurting the entire line."

Finally, Jurgens wrote a memo proposing that the saga end with Ben being revealed as a clone and dying in a climactic act of heroism, while Mary Jane has a miscarriage and separates from Peter. He concluded the memo with "This proposal has holes. But I believe it serves as a general framework we can all work with to fill in as needed. This is my last shot. After this, I give up." In November 1995, a story outline drafted by Jurgens and Budiansky and titled "Blood Brothers" was distributed to the Spider-Man staff. It roughly followed the idea proposed in Jurgens' memo, but added in the revelation that the mastermind behind the saga was Harry Osborn.

As a result of a downgrade, Marvel dissolved the five editor-in-chief positions, leaving only one: Bob Harras. Harras rejected the idea of Osborn being the villain and ordered the "Clone Saga"'s finale to be postponed six months to avoid competition with the crossover storyline "Onslaught". Jurgens left Marvel in frustration at the postponement. Published issues had already dropped clues at Harry Osborn being the villain, and with him eliminated, Budiansky felt compelled to write a memo forbidding that Harry's father Norman take the role: "Norman's death should never be undone, in my opinion. It's too classic... Let him rest in peace." However, as part of a fresh wave of downsizing in Marvel's ranks, Budiansky was laid off.

=== Resolution ===
Harras replaced Budiansky with Ralph Macchio as editor, who declared that Norman Osborn would be the master planner of the cloning. Glenn Greenberg recalled that "The reaction was not enthusiastic. I don't think ANYONE - from the writers to the editors to the assistant editors - agreed with Harras's idea, although his rationale certainly made sense to a certain extent. Harras felt that there was only one person who could have had the money, the resources, the connections, the knowledge, and the motivation to orchestrate the Clone Saga and disrupt Peter Parker's life to such a profound extent." The saga was resolved in "Revelations", which concluded in Spider-Man #75.

To give Norman Osborn's return some credibility and link to continuity, Greenberg charted a detailed timeline to explain how Norman had survived his death and what he had been doing in the years he was believed to be dead. Though this timeline was originally intended only as an internal reference for the creative staff, it became the basis for the follow-up one-shot The Osborn Journal. The issue revealed the details of the Clone Saga from Norman Osborn's perspective, and resolves many plot points, including the skeleton in the smokestack.

=== Spider-Man: The Real Clone Saga ===
Ex-editor-in-chief Tom DeFalco said that under him, the Clone Saga would have been resolved in a different way: "Our plan was to structure the clone saga like a three-act play. Act One would climax at or around Amazing #400—when we revealed that Pete was the clone and Ben was the real guy. Act Two would last around three months and follow Ben's adventures. In Act Three, Peter would triumphantly return as the one, true Spider-Man. Mark and I was hoping the Spider-crew could make Ben a viable character during his turn in the spotlight, and we planned to star Ben in his own monthly title after Peter returned. It was kind of like what I had already done with Thor and Thunderstrike—two very different titles based on a single concept. Of course, our plan went into the trash the day I got fired."

In September 2009, a six-part mini-series based on the outline of the original Clone Saga came out, written by Tom DeFalco and Howard Mackie, and drawn by Todd Nauck, titled Spider-Man: The Clone Saga and later collected as Spider-Man: The Real Clone Saga.

Series co-creator Howard Mackie described how this project was born: "Somewhere along the line I discovered a notebook which contained the original notes from the very first meeting at which the clone story was discussed. The original notes showed that the story was planned as a three month event spread across the four monthly Spider-Man titles. At some point Ralph [Macchio] talked to Joe Quesada, and I got a phone call from Ralph asking if I wanted to do a mini-series showing a version that was truer to what the writers originally imagined. Tom and I remember certain story points differently. The goal with this mini-series was get back to basics, to strip away the extraneous stuff that got layered onto the original story, and to present the cleanest possible version of what was a pretty simple story at heart. It was decided that it would be best if only two writers collaborated on this mini-series."

According to DeFalco, the series closely followed Mackie's notes, but necessarily filled out what was essentially a rough outline with details. In addition, they decided that Jackal and Kaine had to be included in the story to cater to fan expectations, even though neither character is mentioned in Mackie's notes.

==== Plot ====
Ben Reilly and Peter bond after Kaine attacks them, and Ben stays in New York, posing as Peter's cousin to build a life of his own. He adopts the identity of the Scarlet Spider and works at the Daily Grind.

Ben, Peter, and Kaine reach the lair of the shadowy figure responsible for infecting Aunt May and Mary Jane with a genetic virus. The villain is revealed to be the Jackal, who captures all three and reveals that he plans to make an army of Spider-clones and take over the world. Since Ben was the only clone to turn out stable, the Jackal takes a sample of his blood to perfect his cloning technique. A mastermind over the Jackal wants the blood sample as well, for the body of Norman Osborn.

The Jackal intends to clone Gwen Stacy and another unknown figure, and Kaine breaks himself, Ben, and Peter free. During the subsequent fight, the clones dissolve and the Jackal suggests that Ben is the original Peter Parker. Kaine kills the Jackal, Ben and Peter escape with the cure and save Aunt May and Mary Jane, who is revealed to be pregnant. Peter retires, saying Ben is the real one, so Ben creates a new costume.

Peter and MJ begin planning for their baby with the support of Aunt May, while Peter focuses on acquiring a research grant. Ben battles Doctor Octopus, who escapes after knocking down debris. After Ben tracks him down, the villain notes that the newly costumed Spider-Man seems to be an impostor. Kaine arrives and attempts to kill Octopus by asphyxiating him with some webbing and then escaping. Ben shreds the webbing off, saving his life.

Informed that Mary Jane is about to give birth, Ben and Peter swing to the hospital in their respective Spider-Man costumes. They come into conflict with Kaine, who escapes and is chased by Ben as Peter goes to the hospital. At the hospital, the baby is born and named May Parker. The nurse takes the baby to ready her for the parents, but actually hands the baby to Kaine at the docks. Kaine tells the mastermind he has the baby, who remarks that it will be raised overseas.

The mastermind, now in control of a Parker blood sample, resurrects Norman. The mastermind, Harry Osborn, gives a Green Goblin mask to Norman and tells him there is work to be done. Moments later, Harry attacks Ben and captures him as bait for Peter. Harry asserts that Ben is just a clone. Kaine speaks with the revived Norman, who is a clone, and discusses baby May's fate.

Kaine tells Norman he feels that May is his family in addition to Ben, Peter, Mary Jane, and the elder May, and she should not be held accountable for the sins of her father. Harry deploys a Goblin signal outside the building (Oscorp), which attracts Peter, who is still searching for his daughter. Peter finds Ben and both are threatened by Harry. Norman blasts Harry and tells him that he cannot continue the cycle of violence. Peter frees Ben, and both help Norman. Peter's shoulder is dislocated, and Ben demands to know where baby May is, as Aunt May and Mary Jane wonder where Peter is. Kaine enters through a window with baby May and gives her to her family.

Back at Oscorp, Harry is restrained by Ben, so he activates his glider to impale Peter from behind. Ben prepares to leap in the path of the flying glider, but Norman jumps in the way, killing himself with it once more. Norman disintegrates due to cellular degeneration. Harry vows to get even. He is put in a sanatorium. Ben leaves the city, but says he will return from time to time. Peter tells Ben that both villains were liars, and it does not matter who is the clone, but they each have a life.

== Criticism ==
The decision to replace Peter with Ben as the regular, true Spider-Man met with a massive outcry from many readers and was also unpopular with many of the creative staff of the day. Judas Traveller and Scrier were seen as too far out of Spider-Man's league to serve as villains. The decision to resurrect the original Green Goblin was also very controversial; his death was part of the acclaimed "Death of Gwen Stacy" storyline. Glenn Greenberg, author of The Osborn Journal #1, commented "If Norman was alive and watching everything from the shadows, why did he let his son Harry die? Why did he let the first Hobgoblin come into being-especially since Hobgoblin #1 broke into Norman's secret hideout and stole his personal journals? ...[Tom] Brevoort felt that there was just no way that Norman could have been alive all that time. Tom B. felt that if Norman could manipulate Spider-Man's life from afar, for so long, to such an extent, then so much of what had occurred in the books over the years would never have happened, or would have happened very differently."

Spider-Man editor Mark Bernardo said "the length of the story arc was initially planned to be short, but rapidly spun out of control and ended as a fiasco: Ironically, the whole storyline, which was supposed to simplify Spider-Man's mythos and ultimately bring him "back to basics" ended up complicating everything beyond what anyone imagined!"

Howard Mackie stated that "the Clone Saga has not always had the best rap. The thing that struck me in reading various things on the Internet is that people would complain about the Clone Saga, and then go on about how wonderful Ben Reilly was. There is a big movement of 'Bring Back Ben Reilly' folks. I found that very curious." Mackie remarked that the length of the saga resulted in so many conflicting plot elements that even though most of these individual elements were popular, it was almost impossible for any reader to embrace the saga as a whole. Ultimately, Ben Reilly would be resurrected in the 2016 storyline Dead No More: The Clone Conspiracy.

Marvel eventually parodied the saga in Spider-Man: 101 Ways to End the Clone Saga #1 (January 1997), and again with a gag cover for "Sheep-Man" in an issue of What If.

== Other versions ==
=== MC2 ===
The alternate future universe of MC2 Spider-Girl (May "Mayday" Parker) follows up on some events from this storyline. The series establishes that six months after Spider-Man: Revelations, Alison Mongrain was tracked down by Peter's first clone Kaine, who rescued baby Mayday from her grip and returned her to her parents Peter Parker and Mary Jane Watson. Subsequently, she grows up to become Spider-Girl.

The events of "The Final Chapter" (or more accurately, "The Gathering of Five") take place two years later. In the final battle at the conclusion of the MC2 version of the storyline, Norman Osborn dies and Peter loses one of his legs.

Mayday generally wears a costume based on Ben Reilly's Spider-Man design. Elizabeth Tyne from The Lost Years had Ben's son, Reilly Tyne (Darkdevil). Felicity Hardy fights crime as The Scarlet Spider. Kaine is also a recurring character.

Spider-Girl #44–50 and 52 focus on loose ends of the Clone Saga, such as Alison Mongrain planning to kill Normie Osborn, believing he could pose a threat to the child who was placed in her care. May reveals herself to Mongrain to save Normie. Mongrain is last seen in Spider-Girl #52. Issue #44 saw Peter telling May about her Uncle Ben, but not that he was a clone. Overall, the issue recaps the Clone Saga storyline. There was to have been a panel with Ben Reilly in his Scarlet Spider outfit, but it was left out, hence the cover mentions him as the Scarlet Spider.

A new Clone Saga began in the pages of Amazing Spider-Girl. Normie Osborn, inheriting a few of his grandfather's laboratories, stumbles across a fluid tank containing an exact physical duplicate of Mayday Parker, with several journal entries left behind by Norman Osborn indicating that she is the real Mayday. This May is eventually revealed to have symbiotic powers. Eventually, both Mays come to an understanding and, with the aid of Peter and the spirit of his late Aunt May, defeat Norman Osborn in a psychic duel when all three Parkers are briefly merged into one body controlled by Norman's active consciousness. The story continued in The Spectacular Spider-Girl, a feature being published both online and in the pages of the new Web of Spider-Man. In it, the new May changes her name to April and becomes Mayday's rival and occasional partner. Eventually, April is defeated by the Fury and the Goblin Queen and told that she is the clone. April is eventually freed and together, she and Mayday defeat the Fury. April afterwards begins to get involved with the gang warfare erupting in New York and eventually cuts herself off from the Parker Family.

The saga ends with a future incarnation of April who, having experienced a drastically darker future which is created from Mayday's death, travels back in time and urges her past self to save Mayday's life. April agrees, and seemingly sacrifices her own life to save Mayday as she is caught in a ferocious explosion. Mayday mourns April's death, though Peter believes that she survived.

=== Ultimate Marvel ===
The cover for Ultimate Spider-Man #103. Art by Mark Bagley.

The Clone Saga was adapted for Marvel's Ultimate imprint. It began in Ultimate Spider-Man #97 (July 2006) and concluded in #104, with a small epilogue in #105. In the Ultimate Spider-Man continuity, the character Miles Warren was first introduced as Harry Osborn's psychiatrist who was hired by Norman Osborn to brainwash out any memories of his Goblin persona. Ben Reilly was established as an African-American lab assistant with no personal ties to Peter, although in the "Carnage" story-arc, Reilly refers to the Carnage creature as "Little Ben". The creature itself being created from a combination of Peter Parker and Curt Connors' DNA with traces of the Venom suit's genetic material as well.

In this version, Brian Michael Bendis wrote a story in which the Scorpion is captured and revealed to be Peter's clone, sharing 94.2% of Peter Parker's DNA (issues 97, 98). MJ is then abducted, and searching for her, Peter runs into Spider-Woman, and in the following issues, further Spider-Man clones appear, among them one with a disfigured face (Kaine) and a black-suited clone with six arms (Tarantula). Bendis also made Peter reveal his secret identity to Aunt May and the Fantastic Four, and let an amnesiac Gwen Stacy and Peter's presumed dead father Richard Parker re-appear (though the former of the two actually escaped). Via a longer dialogue through Peter and Spider-Woman, Bendis also established that every clone has inherited Peter's love for MJ, and his worries of her getting hurt; as a result, they each tried a different approach, the Scorpion trying to make sense of his jumbled memories, Spider-Woman trying to stop the other clones, Kaine using his advanced mind to incorporate the drug OZ into MJ's body, and the Tarantula trying to defend MJ from Kaine.

Upon waking to find that she has been injected with OZ, MJ is enraged, and her anger triggers a transformation into a large, red monster called the Demogoblin. As of issue 103, the masterminds behind the clones seem to be Doctor Octopus and Ben Reilly (who stole a sample of Spider-Man's blood shortly after the death of Gwen Stacy). A fight between the clones and Doctor Octopus leaves the Tarantula and Kaine apparently dead, and Doctor Octopus captured by S.H.I.E.L.D. As a twist, Bendis established that Doctor Octopus and Reilly acted with consent of the CIA. In addition, Gwen is revealed to be Carnage and Richard revealed to be yet another clone (issues 99-103), aged artificially and given psychic treatment to create his false memories.

As of the end of the Ultimate Clone Saga, the clone posing as Richard died from his rapid aging, Jessica Drew fled after helping Peter defeat Octavius, and Franklin Storm and Reed Richards found a cure for Mary Jane's OZ-related affliction; Peter's relief at her safe condition made him realize his true feelings for her and resumed their relationship. Reed Richards suggested that they might even remove Peter's powers after some more research, since they are also partially caused by the OZ serum. However, after a talk with Nick Fury, Peter rejects the cure and got back together with MJ. The Spider-Woman clone left to embrace the "Jessica Drew" identity and the other remaining clones—the Scorpion and Gwen Stacy—were left in the custody of Nick Fury, who advised his Scientists to 'get to work' on them.

In re-imagining the story for the Ultimate Universe, Bendis inserted many references to the original Clone Saga. Among them are that the brief appearances of the characters Miles Warren and Ben Reilly; Peter re-examining his relationship with MJ; an amnesiac Gwen Stacy appearing from nowhere, then turning out to be more than she seems; Aunt May experiencing a heart attack; a "Scarlet Spider" (Spider-Woman) evading Peter and later being used as exposition; a half-formed, semi-insane clone appearing several times, specifically wanting to protect MJ; a 'mystery woman' called 'Jessica'; an old friend and colleague of Norman Osborn appearing to have been manipulating the scenes from behind (Dr. Mendel Stromm in normal Marvel continuity, Otto Octavius in Ultimate Marvel continuity), later revealing unseen powers over metal.

=== Spider-Man: Life Story ===
Streamlined versions of both Clone Sagas appear in the second and fourth issues of Chip Zdarsky and Mark Bagley's Spider-Man: Life Story, which distill multiple iconic Spider-Man storylines into a timeline where characters naturally aged during the decades of the storylines' publications.

In 1977, the Vietnam War continued as Peter Parker and Gwen Stacy have married, with Gwen working for Miles Warren at a company called Scipro-Genesis. At the beckoning of his father, Harry Osborn donned the moniker of the "Black Goblin" to confront Warren about the clone of Norman he was working on. Exposing the contained clone's hiding place, Harry also unearthed Warren's secret attempts to also clone Peter and Gwen. Enraged by Norman's favoritism towards Peter, Harry fought him while Gwen attempted to flee Warren in disgust. Realizing the grip Norman had over him, Harry stopped the battle and threw a pumpkin bomb to kill the clones. Norman and Gwen's clones are killed in the process, but a clone of Peter survived and was rescued by Peter at Gwen's plea. However, Warren revealed that the Gwen Peter had married was in fact the actual clone, and the original was the one that perished in the pumpkin bomb explosion. In 1978, the clones of Peter and Gwen leave to start new lives together while the original Peter falls into depression over the loss of the original Gwen.

In 1995, the Parker clone, calling himself Ben Reilly, is captured by a dying Doctor Octopus. Peter is later also captured along with Harry. Seeking to recreate Warren's cloning process to prolong his life, Octavius discovers from his analysis of both Parkers that Peter is in fact the clone while Ben is the original. Furious over the perceived deception, Ben takes his anger out on Octavius and attacks him. While Peter tried to calm him down, Octavius tries to kill both Parkers, only for Harry to be killed by him when he leaps to protect Peter. Octavius flees as Harry dies in Peter's arms. Later, Peter allows Ben to take over his life, gifting him a detailed autobiography so he can properly live as Peter Parker again. Bidding farewell, Peter then confronted an elderly Norman Osborn whom he finds with the help of Jessica Jones. Peter deduces that Norman fabricated the test results that Octavius discovered in a bid to ruin his life, and that he was still the original Peter Parker. Initially gloating, Norman discovers that Harry had been killed by Octavius, and attempts to kill Peter with a glider in revenge. When he fails, the strain causes Norman to suffer a heart attack, and he dies in Peter's arms professing his hatred. In the aftermath, Peter rejoined his family and fully retires from being Spider-Man.

In 2006, Ben, now the new Spider-Man, is murdered by Morlun, forcing Peter back into the role to protect his family.

== In other media ==
The six Spider-Men that join to defeat Spider-Carnage in "Spider Wars"

- In Spider-Man: The Animated Series, the "Clone Saga" appears in two forms during the fifth season.
  - In the first version, depicted in the two-part episode "The Return of Hydro-Man", Miles Warren is shown to have created two water-based clones of Hydro-Man and Mary Jane Watson; the former having evaporated in a previous battle with Spider-Man, while the latter was believed to have died after being thrown into an interdimensional portal by the Green Goblin. The Mary Jane clone escaped from Warren's lab and reunited with Spider-Man early in the fourth season, who believed that the real Mary Jane had returned. Eventually, the Hydro-Man clone tracks her down and takes her to Warren's underwater lab, but Spider-Man follows him and learns that both Hydro-Man and Mary Jane are clones. With help from Mary Jane, Spider-Man defeats Hydro-Man, but both clones then evaporate. Following the battle, Warren retrieves a piece of Spider-Man's costume that was torn apart and collects a DNA sample from it as he contacts Alistair Smythe to have Silvermane send some men to repair his underwater laboratory so that he can begin his next project.
  - The second version, which is an adaptation of the second "Clone Saga", is depicted in the two-part series finale "Spider Wars". After testing Spider-Man's leadership skills by having him lead a team of heroes against a team of villains on an alien planet (which served as an adaptation of the "Secret Wars" storyline), Madame Web and the Beyonder bring him to an alternate reality where Miles Warren successfully cloned Peter Parker. After both the real Peter and the clone escaped, the former, believing himself to be the clone, became Ben Reilly aka Scarlet Spider, while the clone became Spider-Man. Upon discovering the truth, however, the clone was driven mad by jealousy, and was approached by the Carnage symbiote, who merged with him and transformed him into Spider-Carnage. After destroying New York with the help of several villains, whom he recruited as his enforcers, Spider-Carnage plotted to destroy the multiverse from his native universe using a matter-disintegrator bomb powered by the Time-Dilation Accelerator, but is foiled by Spider-Man and five of his alternate universe variants. Spider-Carnage then tries to destroy the realities one at a time, and arrives in the armored Spider-Man's native universe, where Uncle Ben is still alive. After the "prime" Spider-Man brings him to confront Spider-Carnage, Ben reminds him about responsibility, allowing Peter to break free of Carnage's control and sacrifice himself to destroy it by throwing himself and Carnage into an interdimensional portal.
- Elements of the "Clone Saga" are incorporated in Ultimate Spider-Man. The three-part episode "The Spider-Slayers" introduces the Spider-Slayers, which are Synthezoids created by Arnim Zola from Spider-Man's DNA. There are five known Synthezoids: Scarlet Spider, Kaine, Bone Spider, Goliath Spider, and Ghost Spider. Kaine is an imperfect Synthezoid that resembles Spider-Man, who is highly resistant to damage and can reattach lost limbs and feed off the life energy of Spider-Man or other Spider-Slayers. Scarlet Spider (later named Ben Reilly) is an almost perfect clone of Spider-Man in terms of physical appearance and powers, except he dons a different costume (reminiscent of Kaine Parker's Scarlet Spider costume) and has a scar on his face. Bone Spider dons a mostly blue costume, with a yellow spider symbol, and has claws and spikes all over his body. Goliath Spider is the largest and strongest of all the Spider-Slayers, and can turn his body into metal. Ghost Spider dons a mostly white costume, with a black spider symbol, and can teleport, become intangible, and generate electricity.
- In September 2026, it was announced that a TV series based on the "Clone Saga" was in development from Sony Pictures Television and Amazon Prime Video. The series, which will follow Ben Reilly and Kane as they grapple with their newly discovered identities as clones while also facing other clones, will be written by Kelvin Yu, with Yu, Amy Pascal, Phil Lord and Christopher Miller serving as executive producers.

== Collected editions ==
Title	Material collected	Published date	ISBN
First Clone Saga
Spider-Man: Clone Genesis	Amazing Spider-Man #141-151, Giant-Size Spider-Man #5	December 1995	978-0785101345
Spider-Man: The Original Clone Saga	Amazing Spider-Man #139-150, Giant-Size Spider-Man #5, Spectacular Spider-Man #25-31,149, 162-163, Annual #8	July 2011	978-0785155232
Amazing Spider-Man Epic Collection: Spider-Man or Spider-Clone?	Amazing Spider-Man #143-164, Annual #10, and material from Marvel Treasury Edition #1	July 2023	978-1302948740
Second Clone Saga
Spider-Man: The Complete Clone Saga Epic Book 1	Amazing Spider-Man #394; Spectacular Spider-Man #217; Spider-Man #51-53; Spider-Man Unlimited #7; Web of Spider-Man #117-119; Spider-Man: The Lost Years #1-3	April 2010	978-0785144625
Spider-Man: The Complete Clone Saga Epic, Book 2	Amazing Spider-Man #395-399; Spectacular Spider-Man #218-221; Spider-Man #54-56; Spider-Man Unlimited #8, Web of Spider-Man #120-122; Spider-Man: Funeral for an Octopus #1-3	June 2010	978-0785143512
Spider-Man: The Complete Clone Saga Epic Book 3	Amazing Spider-Man #400-401, Super Special #1; Spectacular Spider-Man #222-224, Super Special #1; Spider-Man #57-58, Super Special #1; Spider-Man Unlimited #9; Web of Spider-Man #123-124, Super Special #1; Spider-Man: The Clone Journal #1, Venom Super Special #1	September 2010	978-0785149545
Spider-Man: The Complete Clone Saga Epic Book 4	Amazing Spider-Man #402-404; Spectacular Spider-Man #225-227; Spider-Man #59-61; Web of Spider-Man #125-127; New Warriors #61; Spider-Man: The Jackal Files #1; Spider-Man: Maximum Clonage Alpha #1 and Omega #1	December 2010	978-0785149552
Spider-Man: The Complete Clone Saga Epic Book 5	Amazing Spider-Man Super Special #1; Spider-Man Super Special #1; Venom Super Special #1, Spectacular Spider-Man Super Special #1, Web of Spider-Man Super Special #1, New Warriors #62, Web of Spider-Man #128-129, Amazing Spider-Man #405-406, Spider-Man #62-63, Spider-Man Unlimited #10, Spectacular Spider-Man #228-229, Spider-Man Team-Up #1	January 2011	978-0785150091
Spider-Man: The Complete Ben Reilly Epic Book 1	Spider-Man: The Parker Years #1; New Warriors #65-66; Scarlet Spider Unlimited #1; Web of Scarlet Spider #1-2; Amazing Scarlet Spider #1-2; Scarlet Spider #1-2; Spectacular Scarlet Spider #1-2; Green Goblin #3; and Sensational Spider-Man #0 and Wizard mini-comic #3	August 2011	978-0785155454
Spider-Man: The Complete Ben Reilly Epic Book 2	Amazing Spider-Man #407-408; New Warriors #67; Sensational Spider-Man #1; Spectacular Spider-Man #230; Spider-Man #64-65; Spider-Man/Punisher: Family Plot #1-2; Web of Scarlet Spider #3-4, and material from Spider-Man Holiday Special and Venom: Along Came a Spider #1-4	November 2011	978-0785156123
Spider-Man: The Complete Ben Reilly Epic Book 3	Amazing Spider-Man #409-410; Sensational Spider-Man #2-3; Spectacular Spider-Man #231-233; Spider-Man #66-67; Spider-Man: The Final Adventure #1-4; Spider-Man Team-Up #2; Spider-Man Unlimited #11	January 2012	978-0785156130
Spider-Man: The Complete Ben Reilly Epic Book 4	Amazing Spider-Man #411-413; Daredevil #354; Sensational Spider-Man #4-6; Spectacular Spider-Man #234; Spider-Man #68-70; Spider-Man: Redemption #1-4; Spider-Man Unlimited #12, Spider-Man Team-Up #3	April 2012	978-0785161318
Spider-Man: The Complete Ben Reilly Epic Book 5	Amazing Spider-Man #414-416, material from Annual '96; Sensational Spider-Man #7-10; Spectacular Spider-Man #235-239; Spider-Man #71-72; Spider-Man Team-Up #4; Spider-Man Unlimited #13	July 2012	978-0785163831
Spider-Man: The Complete Ben Reilly Epic Book 6	Amazing Spider-Man #417-418; Sensational Spider-Man #11; Spectacular Spider-Man #240-241; Spider-Man #73-75; Spider-Man Team-Up #5; Spider-Man Unlimited #14; Spider-Man: Revelations (with extra pages); Spider-Man: The Osborn Journal #1; Spider-Man: 101 Ways to End the Clone Saga #1; Spider-Man: Dead Man's Hand #1	November 2012	978-0785165521
Spider-Man: Clone Saga Omnibus Vol. 1	Amazing Spider-Man #394-401, Web of Spider-Man #117-125, Spider-Man #51-58, Spectacular Spider-Man #217-224, Spider-Man Unlimited #7-9	October 2016	978-1302902162
Spider-Man: Clone Saga Omnibus Vol. 2	Amazing Spider-Man #402-406, Super Special, Spider-Man #59-63, Super Special; Spectacular Spider-Man #225-229, Super Special; Web of Spider-Man #126-129, Super Special; Venom Super Special; New Warriors #61-66; Spider-Man: The Jackal Files #1; Spider-Man: Maximum Clonage Alpha, Omega; Spider-Man Unlimited #10; Spider-Man Team-Up #1; Spider-Man: The Lost Years #1-3; Spider-Man: The Parker Years #1	November 2017	978-1302907983
Spider-Man: Ben Reilly Omnibus Vol. 1	Amazing Spider-Man #407-410; Spider-Man: The Parker Years #1; New Warriors #65-67; Scarlet Spider Unlimited #1; Web of Scarlet Spider #1-4; Amazing Scarlet Spider #1-2; Scarlet Spider #1-2; Spectacular Scarlet Spider #1-2; Green Goblin #3; Sensational Spider-Man #0, Wizard mini-comic #3, Sensational Spider-Man #1-3; Spectacular Spider-Man #230-233; Spider-Man #64-67; Spider-Man/Punisher: Family Plot #1-2, Spider-Man: The Final Adventure #1-4; Spider-Man Team-Up #2; Spider-Man Unlimited #11; and material from Spider-Man Holiday Special and Venom: Along Came a Spider #1-4	January 2019	978-1302913854
Spider-Man: Ben Reilly Omnibus Vol. 2	Amazing Spider-Man #411-418, Sensational Spider-Man #4-11, Spider-Man #68-75, Spectacular Spider-Man #234-241, Spider-Man Unlimited #12-14, Spider-Man: Redemption #1-4, Daredevil #354, Spider-Man Team-Up #4-5, Spider-Man: The Osborn Journal #1,Spider-Man: 101 Ways to End the Clone Saga #1, Spider-Man: Dead Man's Hand #1	October 2020	978-1302925208
The Amazing Spider-Man Epic Collection: The Clone Saga	Amazing Spider-Man #394-396, Web of Spider-Man #117-119, Spider-Man #51-53, Spectacular Spider-Man #217-219, Spider-Man Unlimited #7	January 2024	978-1302953669
The Amazing Spider-Man Epic Collection: Web of Life, Web of Death	Amazing Spider-Man #397-399; Spectacular Spider-Man #220-222; Web of Spider-Man #120-123; Spider-Man #54-56; Spider-Man Unlimited #8; Spider-Man: Funeral For An Octopus #1-3; Spider-Man: The Clone Journal	November 2024	978-1302960087
The Amazing Spider-Man Epic Collection: The Mark of Kaine	Amazing Spider-Man #400-403; Spectacular Spider-Man #223-226; Web of Spider-Man #124-126; Spider-Man #57-60; Spider-Man Unlimited #9	December 2026	978-1302970055
The Amazing Spider-Man Epic Collection: Maximum Clonage	Amazing Spider-Man #404; Web of Spider-Man # 127; Spider-Man #61; Spectacular Spider Man #227; Spider-Man: The Jackal Files #1; Spider-Man: Maximum Clonage Alpha #1; Spider-Man: Maximum Clonage Omega #1; New Warriors 61-62; material from Amazing Spider-Man Super Special #1; Spider-Man Super Special #1; Venom Super Special #1; Spectacular Spider-Man Super Special #1; Web of Spider-Man Super Special #1	February 2027	TBC
Others
Ultimate Spider-Man: Clone Saga	Ultimate Spider-Man #97-105	April 2007	978-0785126775
Spider-Man: The Real Clone Saga	Spider-Man: The Clone Saga #1-6	June 2010	978-0785144243
Miles Morales Vol. 5: The Clone Saga	Miles Morales: Spider-Man #22-28	October 2021	978-1302926014
