= Mark Bagley =

American comics artist (born 1957)

- Bagley at GalaxyCon Des Moines in 2026
- Born: August 7, 1957 (age 69) Frankfurt, West Germany
- Area: Penciller
- Notable works: The New Warriors; The Amazing Spider-Man; Thunderbolts; Venom; Ultimate Spider-Man; Avengers; Fantastic Four; Trinity

Mark Bagley (/ˈbæɡli/; born August 7, 1957) is an American comics artist. He has worked for Marvel Comics on such titles as The Amazing Spider-Man, Thunderbolts, The New Warriors, Venom and Ultimate Spider-Man and for DC Comics on Justice League of America, Batman, and Trinity. Bagley co-created Marvel Comics characters Carnage and the Thunderbolts.

== Early life ==
Mark Bagley was born to a military family in Frankfurt, West Germany.

== Career ==
After his work in the military and at Ringling College of Art and Design, Bagley continued trying to break into the comic industry. While working a construction job, he suffered a severe injury to his leg while using a handsaw that required 132 stitches. He eventually ended up working for Lockheed Martin making technical drawings.

=== Marvel Comics ===
In 1983, Marvel Comics Editor-in-Chief Jim Shooter created the Marvel Try-out Book to draw new talent into the comic book industry. The contest involved a deconstructed comic book, which contestants could complete and submit to Marvel. The winner would be awarded a professional assignment with Marvel. At the time, Bagley was 27 years old and living in Marietta, Georgia. He had almost given up on trying to find a job in comics and was satisfied with his position at Lockheed Martin. Bagley was reluctant to enter the contest because of the cost of the Try-out Book itself. His friend, Cliff Biggers, gave him the book and persuaded Bagley to enter the contest. Bagley won first place for penciling, finishing ahead of thousands of other hopefuls. After winning the contest, he did not hear from Marvel for several months. After approaching Shooter at a comic convention, Bagley was assigned to a series of low-profile penciling jobs. His comics work during this period included Visionaries, a comic book based on a 1980s toy line, various titles in the New Universe line, backup stories in Captain America, and the first series of Marvel Universe Cards.

In 1989, Tom DeFalco and Ron Frenz created a team of teenage superheroes called the New Warriors. The following year, Marvel launched a new series based on these heroes and assigned Bagley and writer Fabian Nicieza to the title. Bagley stayed on the title until #25, at which point he left to transition directly onto The Amazing Spider-Man.

When Erik Larsen left The Amazing Spider-Man in 1991, Bagley was assigned to the title. He and David Michelinie introduced the Carnage character in The Amazing Spider-Man #361 (April 1992) and produced the Venom: Lethal Protector limited series in 1993. Although not the first artist to draw either Venom or Eddie Brock, Bagley's version of both characters are widely considered to be the most popular versions of them by fans. Bagley was one of the artists on the "Maximum Carnage" and "Clone Saga" storylines which ran through the Spider-Man titles. Bagley's artwork was used extensively for licensed material, appearing on everything from plates and cups to credit cards and even video games such The Amazing Spider-Man: Lethal Foes released exclusively in Japan. In 2012, Comic Book Resources ranked Bagley fourth on its list of the "50 Greatest Spider-Man Creators".

In 1997, Bagley collaborated with writer Kurt Busiek on a new team of superheroes, the Thunderbolts, a group of super-villains disguised as super-heroes, with the final page of the first issue of the series revealing that the Thunderbolts were actually the Masters of Evil, a surprise twist carefully guarded by Marvel.

In 2000, Marvel's then-publisher Bill Jemas was looking to relaunch Marvel's primary franchises in a way that would make them accessible to newer readers. Ultimate Spider-Man would be a title that began the Spider-Man mythos from the beginning set in modern times. Bagley was assigned to Ultimate Spider-Man with writer Brian Michael Bendis. The Bendis/Bagley partnership of 111 consecutive issues made their partnership one of the longest in American comic book history, and the longest run by a Marvel creative team, beating out Stan Lee and Jack Kirby on Fantastic Four. Bagley collaborated with Bendis on The Pulse and a four-issue arc on Mighty Avengers.

Bagley's long and successful run on Ultimate Spider-Man earned him recognition in Wizard magazine's top ten artists of the 2000s in Wizard #219. Ranked #2 on the list, article writer Mark Allen Haverty noted of Bagley, "no other artist came close to the number of comics Bagley sold [in the 2000s], nor the number of Top 20 comics he was a part of."

=== DC Comics ===
In 2008, Bagley signed an exclusive three-year contract with DC Comics. His first assignment as a DC exclusive, the Trinity weekly series written by Kurt Busiek featured Superman, Batman, and Wonder Woman.

Bagley drew four issues of Batman, written by Judd Winick. This was in the post-Battle for the Cowl world, with Dick Grayson having taken over as the Dark Knight. Bagley then teamed with writer James Robinson on Justice League of America. Bagley drew most of issues #38-53.

=== Return to Marvel ===
In 2011, Bagley left DC and returned to Marvel and Ultimate Spider-Man. He reunited with writer Brian Michael Bendis and drew the "Death of Spider-Man" arc in issues #156-160. As he started the Ultimate imprint alongside Bendis, he was also called for Cataclysm, Ultimate End (which ended the imprint) and the last pages of Spider-Men II (which set up its return). Bagley and Bendis teamed for a creator-owned series, Brilliant, which was published through Marvel's Icon Comics Imprint. It has similarities to Mark Millar's own Icon comic, Kick-Ass, as it explores the idea of superheroes existing in the real world, however unlike Kick-Ass, the characters have actual super-powers.

Brian Michael Bendis and Bagley worked on Avengers Assemble, an Avengers title produced concurrently with Brilliant. To differentiate between other Avengers titles, Assemble consisted of the roster present in the Avengers film, but set in present Marvel continuity.

As part of the Marvel NOW! initiative, Bagley and writer Matt Fraction relaunched the Fantastic Four series in 2012. Bagley and Mark Waid collaborated on a Hulk series in 2014.

In late 2017, Bagley made a return to Venom with issue #155, "Lethal Protector", written by Mike Costa. This brief return lasted only four issues.

== Art quirks ==
According to Bagley, drawing crowd scenes are his "weak point", because he becomes worn out on them, and finds them difficult to render in a timely fashion.

== Personal life ==
Bagley and his wife Pattie have a daughter, Angie.

== Bibliography ==
=== DC Comics ===
- Batman #688-691 (2009)
- DCU Halloween Special '09 #1 (2009)
- Justice League of America vol. 2 #38-48, 50-53 (2009–2011)
- Justice League: Cry for Justice #2 (Atom backup feature) (2009)
- Justice Society of America #41-42 (2010)
- Power Company: Sapphire #1 (2002)
- Superboy vol. 4 #77 (2000)
- Superman 80-Page Giant #3 (2000)
- Trinity #1-52 (2008–2009)

=== Marvel Comics ===
- All-New X-Men vol. 2 #1–19 (2015–2017)
- Alpha Flight #86 (1990)
- Armor Wars #1/2 (2015)
- The Amazing Scarlet Spider #1–2 (1995)
- The Amazing Spider-Man #345, 351–358, 361–365, 368–375, 378–404, 407–415, 789 (1991–1996, 2017)
- The Amazing Spider-Man vol. 5 #45, 48–49, 53–54, 56–57, 60, 64, 66–69, 74, 89–90, 92.BEY, 93 (2020–2022)
- The Amazing Spider-Man vol. 6 #31 (2023)
- The Amazing Spider-Man Annual #22–23 (1988–1989)
- The Amazing Spider-Man: Full Circle (2019)
- The Amazing Spider-Man: Going Big (2019)
- Avengers Annual #18 (1989)
- Avengers Assemble #1–8 (2012)
- Avengers: Standoff - Welcome to Pleasant Hill (2016)
- Avengers Two: Wonder Man & Beast #1–3 (2000)
- Avengers #5.1 (2017)
- Ben Reilly: The Scarlet Spider #1–5 (2017)
- Brilliant #1–5 (2011–2012)
- Captain America #366–369, 371–383, 385, Annual #9 (1990–1991)
- Captain America/Citizen V '98 #1 (1999)
- Cataclysm: The Ultimates' Last Stand (2013)
- Daredevil #283, Annual #5 (1989–1990)
- Dead No More: The Clone Conspiracy - Omega (2017)
- Deadpool: Assassin #1–6 (2018)
- Defenders: From the Marvel Vault one-shot (2011)
- Elektra: Black, White & Blood (2022)
- The Fallen (2016)
- Fantastic Four #351 (1991)
- Fantastic Four vol. 3 #51–54 (2002)
- Fantastic Four vol. 4 #1–13 (2013)
- Fantastic Four: 4 Yancy Street (2019)
- Fantastic Four Fanfare #4 (2025)
- Fear Itself: The Fearless #1–12 (2011–2012)
- Guardians of the Galaxy #19 (2017)
- Hawkeye: Earth's Mightiest Marksman #1 (1998)
- Heroes Reborn: Young Allies #1 (2000)
- Hulk vol. 3 #1–16, Annual #1 (2014–2015)
- Hulk: The Official Movie Adaptation #1 (2003)
- Iron Man vol. 3 #21 (1999)
- The Invincible Iron Man #600 (2018)
- Iron Man Annual #10 (1989)
- Marc Spector: Moon Knight #25 (1991)
- Marvel Comics Presents #43, 97, 124 (1990–1993)
- Marvel Legacy Primer Pages: All-New Wolverine, The Amazing Spider-Man, Cable, The Despicable Deadpool, Falcon, Iron Fist, Jean Grey, Jessica Jones, Luke Cage, Spider-Gwen, The Unbelievable Gwenpool, Venom, X-Men: Blue & X-Men: Gold (one page stories) (2017)
- The Mighty Avengers #7–11 (2008)
- Moment of Silence #1 (2002)
- New Mutants Annual #5 (1989)
- The New Warriors #1–25, Annual #1 (1990–1992)
- Night Thrasher #1 (1993)
- Nightmask #9–10, 12 (1987)
- Original Sin #3.1, 3.3 (2014)
- Original Sins #3 (2014)
- Psi-Force #20, 24 (1988)
- The Pulse #1–5 (2004)
- Punisher Annual #2 (1989)
- Quicksilver #3 (1998)
- RoboCop 2 #1 (movie adaptation) (1990)
- Silver Surfer Annual #2 (1989)
- The Spectacular Spider-Man Annual #8–9 (1988–1989)
- Spider-Man #26 (1992)
- Spider-Man 3: The Black (2007)
- Spider-Man #1–10 (2022–2023)
- Spider-Man: Life Story #1–6, Annual #1 (2019–2021)
- Superior Spider-Man #1–8 (2023–2024)
- Spider-Man Unlimited #1–2 (1993)
- Stan Lee Meets Doctor Strange #1 (2006)
- Star Brand #10 (1987)
- Star Trek: Mirror Mirror #1 (1997)
- Strikeforce: Morituri #23, 26–30 (1988–1989)
- Strikeforce Morituri: Electric Undertow #1–5 (1989–1990)
- Tales of the Marvel Universe #1 (1997)
- Thor Annual #14 (1989)
- Thunderbolts #1–6, 8–44, 46–48, 50–51, 59, 66, 68, 72, 74, #0, Annual 1997, Annual 2000 (1997–2003)
- Ultimate End #1–5 (2015)
- Ultimate Iron Man #5 (with Andy Kubert) (2006)
- Ultimate Spider-Man #1–111, 156–160, Super Special #1 (2000–2007, 2011)
- Ultimate Comics Fallout #1, 6 (2011)
- Ultimatum: Spider-Man Requiem #1–2 (2009)
- Uncanny X-Men #488 (second story) (2007)
- Uncanny X-Men vol. 5 #1 (back-up stories) (2019)
- Venom: Lethal Protector #1–3 (1993)
- Venom Super Special #1 (1995)
- Venom vol. 3 #155–158 (2017)
- Venom vol. 4 #21–25, 35 (2020–2021)
- Visionaries #1–6 (1987–1988)
- Web of Spider-Man #51, 53, Annual #5 (1989)
- West Coast Avengers Annual #4 (1989)
- What If...? vol. 2 #4 (1989)
- X-Factor vol. 2 #21 (2007)
- X-Factor Annual #4 (1989)
- X-Men Annual #13 (1989)

Preceded by n/a	The New Warriors artist 1990–1992	Succeeded by Darick Robertson
Preceded by Erik Larsen	The Amazing Spider-Man artist 1991–1996	Succeeded by Steve Skroce
Preceded by n/a	Thunderbolts artist 1997–2001	Succeeded by Patrick Zircher
Preceded by n/a	Ultimate Spider-Man artist 2000–2007	Succeeded by Stuart Immonen
