= The Astonishing Spider-Man =

Comic book series

- The Astonishing Spider-Man volume 3 #1, published by Panini Comics in 2009

Publication information
- Publisher: Panini Comics and Marvel UK
- Schedule: Fortnightly
- Genre: Superhero
- Publication date: Volume 1: November 1995 – April 2007; Volume 2: April 2007 – December 2009; Volume 3: December 2009 – September 2013; Volume 4: October 2013 – January 2015; Volume 5: January 2015 – July 2016; Volume 6: August 2016 – May 2018; Volume 7: May 2018 – April 2020
- Editor: Brady Webb

The Astonishing Spider-Man is a comic book series published fortnightly in the United Kingdom by Panini Comics as part of Marvel UK's 'Collectors Edition' line. It reprinted selected Spider-Man stories and material from the American comic books.

== Format ==
The current format is 76 pages, with three stories being printed every issue. Whilst it usually prints more modern story lines, 'classic' tales are also used as back-up strips. The inside front cover of the comic contains a message from the editor as well as a 'Story So Far' section to allow lapsed readers to catch up. At the back of the comic is a letter's page (Web-Mail) whereby readers can write in and give their views and opinions on the stories. The letters page also previously included short comic strips entitled 'Mini-Marvels', initially reprints of Chris Giarrusso's & Lew Stringer's work. A subscription is also available.

== Publication history ==
With Panini Comics having obtained the licence to reprint Marvel comics internationally, Astonishing Spider-Man began publication in November 1995. 150 issues were published in the first volume before the title was re-launched in 2007 to mark its change from a four-weekly publishing schedule to a two-weekly one. Volume 2 ran for two years before it was re-launched again in December 2009 to mark the start of the "Brand New Day" storyline. Volume 4 launched in October 2013 as the Superior Spider-Man run of stories began in the title. Volume 7 is ongoing.

== Printed material ==
=== Volume 5 (2014–2016) ===
- "Spider-Verse"
- "Secret Wars"

=== Volume 6 (2016–2018) ===
- Amazing Spider-Man Vol. 4
- Spider-Man/Deadpool Vol. 1
- Amazing Spider-Man: Renew Your Vows Vol. 2
- Peter Parker: The Spectacular Spider-Man Vol. 1
- The Amazing Spider-Man: Family Business Original Graphic Novel
- Spider-Man Vol. 2 (Miles Morales)
- Spider-Gwen Vol. 2
- Prowler Vol. 2
- Clone Conspiracy Vol. 1/Omega
- Free Comic Book Day 2017 Captain America
- Civil War II: Amazing Spider-Man
- Spidey Vol. 1
- Spider-Man & The X-Men Vol. 1
- Amazing Spider-Man Vol. 1 #148 - #152 was also published.

=== Volume 7 (2018–2020) ===
Issue 1: 100-PAGE-SPECIAL!

- Amazing Spider-Man #789
- Venom Vol. 3 #1
- Amazing Spider-Man: Renew Your Vows #13 - #15
- Release: 10 May 2018

Issue 2:

- Amazing Spider-Man #790
- Venom Vol. 3 #2 - #3
- Amazing Spider-Man: Renew Your Vows #15
- Release: 24 May 2018

Issue 3:

- Amazing Spider-Man #791
- Venom Vol. 3 #4 - #6
- Release: 7 June 2018

Issue 4:

- Spider-Men II #1
- Venom Vol. 3 #6
- Venom #150 - #151
- Release: 21 June 2018

Issue 5:

- Spider-Men II #2
- Venom #152 - #153, #150
- Release: 5 July 2018

Issue 6:

- Spider-Men II #3
- Venom #153 - #154, #150
- Release: 19 July 2018

== See also ==
- The Amazing Spider-Man
- List of Spider-Man titles
- Spider-Man
- Panini Comics
