= List of Spider-Man storylines =

The superhero Spider-Man has appeared in many American comic books published by Marvel Comics since he first appeared in Amazing Fantasy #15 (August 1962). The character has since been featured in various storylines, forming longer story arcs. These particular arcs have been given special names and have gone through various reprints over the years. During the 1960s and 1970s, these story arcs normally only lasted three issues or less (sometimes only one, such as the classic story "Spider-Man No More!") and would appear in Spider-Man's main comic book title The Amazing Spider-Man. "The Death of Jean DeWolff" was the first popular story arc outside The Amazing Spider-Man, as it appeared in the third monthly ongoing series of The Spectacular Spider-Man.

== Description ==
Starting in the 1980s, more Spider-Man comic book titles became popular, with Spider-Man storylines being connected to different comics. Story arcs become longer than in previous decades, such as "Kraven's Last Hunt", "Maximum Carnage", and the "Clone Saga". Spider-Man story arcs could be found in titles such as The Amazing Spider-Man, The Spectacular Spider-Man, Web of Spider-Man, Spider-Man Unlimited, and Peter Parker: Spider-Man. During the 21st century, the more popular Spider-Man story arcs would mostly be found in The Amazing Spider-Man, with some arcs taking as long as a year to complete.

Comics such as "Secret Wars", "Spider-Island" and "Dead No More: The Clone Conspiracy" are crossover comic books and sometimes move away from Spider-Man titles and involve other comic books.

== Known storylines ==
Storyline	Issue(s)	Publication date	Writer(s)	Penciller(s)
"If This Be My Destiny...!"	The Amazing Spider-Man #31–33	December 1965 – February 1966	Stan Lee; Steve Ditko	Steve Ditko
"How Green Was My Goblin!"	The Amazing Spider-Man #39–40	August – September 1966	Stan Lee	John Romita Sr.
"Spider-Man No More!"	The Amazing Spider-Man #50–52	July – September 1967	Stan Lee	John Romita Sr.
"Doc Ock Wins!"	The Amazing Spider-Man #53–56, 58	October 1967 – January 1968	Stan Lee	John Romita Sr.
"Lo, This Monster"	The Spectacular Spider-Man (magazine) #1–2	July–November 1968	Stan Lee	John Romita Sr.
"The Lifeline Tablet Saga"	The Amazing Spider-Man #68–77 Spider-Man: Lifeline #1–3	January–October 1969	Stan Lee	John Romita Sr.
"The Death of Captain Stacy"	The Amazing Spider-Man #87–92	August 1970 – January 1971	Stan Lee	Gil Kane
"Green Goblin Reborn!"	The Amazing Spider-Man #96–98	May–July 1971	Stan Lee	Gil Kane
"The Six Arms Saga"	The Amazing Spider-Man #100–102	September–November 1971	Stan Lee; Roy Thomas	Gil Kane
"The Night Gwen Stacy Died"	The Amazing Spider-Man #121–122	June–July 1973	Gerry Conway	Gil Kane
"The Original Clone Saga"	The Amazing Spider-Man #139–150; Giant-Size Spider-Man #5; Peter Parker, the Spectacular Spider-Man #25–31, 149, 162–163 and Annual #8; What If? #30	December 1974 – November 1975 December 1978 – June 1979	Gerry Conway Bill Mantlo Various	Ross Andru Jim Mooney Various
"The Return Of The Burglar"	The Amazing Spider-Man #193–200	June 1979 – January 1980	Marv Wolfman	Various
"Nothing Can Stop the Juggernaut!"	The Amazing Spider-Man #229–230	June–July 1982	Roger Stern	John Romita Jr.
"Hyde & Seek"	The Amazing Spider-Man #231–232	August–September 1982	Roger Stern	John Romita Jr.
"The Kid Who Collects Spider-Man"	The Amazing Spider-Man #248	January 1984	Roger Stern	Ron Frenz
"Secret Wars"	The Amazing Spider-Man #249–252	February–May 1984	Jim Shooter	
"The Alien Costume Saga"	The Amazing Spider-Man #252–263; Marvel Team-Up #141–150; Peter Parker, the Spectacular Spider-Man #90–100; Web of Spider-Man #1	1984–1985	Various	Various
"The Death of Jean DeWolff"	Peter Parker, the Spectacular Spider-Man #107–110	October 1985–January 1986	Peter David	Rich Buckler
"The Wedding!"	The Amazing Spider-Man Annual #21	1987	Jim Shooter; David Michelinie	Paul Ryan
"Fearful Symmetry: Kraven's Last Hunt"	Web of Spider-Man #31–32; The Amazing Spider-Man #293–294; Peter Parker, the Spectacular Spider-Man #131–132	October–November 1987	J. M. DeMatteis	Mike Zeck
"Venom Strikes Back"	The Amazing Spider-Man #315–317	May–June 1989	David Michelinie	Todd McFarlane
"Torment"	Spider-Man #1–5	August–December 1990	Todd McFarlane	Todd McFarlane
"The Return of the Sinister Six"	The Amazing Spider-Man #334–350	July 1990–August 1991	David Michelinie	Erik Larsen
"Invasion of the Spider-Slayers"	The Amazing Spider-Man #368–373	November 1992–January January	David Michelinie	Mark Bagley
"Maximum Carnage"	Spider-Man Unlimited #1–2; Web of Spider-Man #101–103; The Amazing Spider-Man #378–380; Spider-Man #35–37; The Spectacular Spider-Man #201–203	May–August 1993	Various	Various
"The Clone Saga"	Various	October 1994-December 1996	Various	Various
"Planet of the Symbiotes"	The Amazing Spider-Man Super Special #1; Spider-Man Super Special #1; The Spectacular Spider-Man Super Special #1; Web of Spider-Man Super Special #1	June–October 1995	David Michelinie	Various
"Identity Crisis"	The Amazing Spider-Man #434–435; The Sensational Spider-Man #27–28; Peter Parker: Spider-Man #91–92; The Spectacular Spider-Man #257–258	May–June 1998	Todd Dezago; Howard Mackie; Tom DeFalco; J. M. DeMatteis	
"The Gathering of Five"	The Amazing Spider-Man #440; The Sensational Spider-Man #32–33; Peter Parker: Spider-Man #96; The Spectacular Spider-Man #262	1998	Todd Dezago; John Byrne; Howard Mackie	
"The Final Chapter"	The Amazing Spider-Man #441; Peter Parker: Spider-Man #97–98; The Spectacular Spider-Man #263	1998	Todd Dezago; John Byrne; Howard Mackie	
"Flowers for Rhino"	Spider-Man's Tangled Web #5–6	October–November 2001	Peter Milligan	
"The Book of Ezekiel"	The Amazing Spider-Man #503–508	January–June 2004	J. Michael Straczynski; John Romita	
"The Other"	Friendly Neighborhood Spider-Man #1–4; Marvel Knights Spider-Man #19–22; The Amazing Spider-Man #525–528	December 2005–March 2006	Peter David; Reginald Hudlin; J. Michael Straczynski	
"Civil War"	The Amazing Spider-Man #529–538	April 2006–March 2007	J. Michael Straczynski	Ron Garney
"Back in Black"	The Amazing Spider-Man #539–543	April–October 2007	J. Michael Straczynski	Ron Garney
"One More Day"	The Amazing Spider-Man #544–545; Friendly Neighborhood Spider-Man #24; The Sensational Spider-Man (vol. 2) #41	November 2007–January 2008	J. Michael Straczynski; Joe Quesada	Joe Quesada
"Brand New Day"	The Amazing Spider-Man #546–564	January–July 2008	Dan Slott; Marc Guggenheim; Bob Gale; Zeb Wells	
"Kraven's First Hunt"	The Amazing Spider-Man #565–567	August–October 2008	Marc Guggenheim	Phil Jimenez
"New Ways to Die"	The Amazing Spider-Man #568–573	August–October 2008	Dan Slott	John Romita Jr.
"Spidey Meets the President!"	The Amazing Spider-Man #583	2009	Zeb Wells	Todd Nauck; Frank D'Armata
"Died in Your Arms Tonight"	The Amazing Spider-Man #600–601	July–August 2009	Various	Various
"Red-Headed Stranger"	The Amazing Spider-Man #602–605	August–September 2009	Various	Various
"Return of the Black Cat"	The Amazing Spider-Man #606–611	September 2009–January 2010	Joe Kelly	Mike McKone; Eric Canete
"The Gauntlet"	The Amazing Spider-Man #612–633	November 2009–June 2010	Various	
"Grim Hunt"	The Amazing Spider-Man #634–637	August–July 2010	Various	
"One Moment in Time"	The Amazing Spider-Man #638–641	September–October 2010	Joe Quesada	
"Origin of the Species"	The Amazing Spider-Man #642–647	November–December 2010	Various	Various
"Big Time"	The Amazing Spider-Man #648–656	November 2010–March 2011	Dan Slott	
"Spider-Island"	The Amazing Spider-Man #666–673; Additional Marvel Comics comic books, the majority having Spider-Island featured in front of their title Venom (vol. 2) #6–8	August–November 2011	Dan Slott	Stefano Caselli
"Ends of the Earth"	The Amazing Spider-Man #682–687 (along with one Special); The Avenging Spider-Man #8	March–June 2012	Dan Slott	Stefano Caselli
"Dying Wish"	The Amazing Spider-Man #698–700	November–December 2012	Dan Slott	Humbertos Rambos; Richard Elson
"Family Business"	The Amazing Spider-Man: Family Business	April 2014	James Robinson; Mark Waid	Werther and Gabriele Dell
"Spider-Verse"	Various	November 2014 – February 2015	Dan Slott	Olivier Coipel; Giuseppe Camuncoli
"Dead No More: The Clone Conspiracy"	The Amazing Spider-Man #19–24	2016	Dan Slott	Jim Cheung; Giuseppe Camuncoli
"Go Down Swinging"	The Amazing Spider-Man #797–800	2018	Dan Slott	Nick Brashaw; Humberto Ramos; Giuseppe Camuncoli; Stuart Immonen; Marcos Martin; Mike Hawthorne
"Spider-Geddon"	Various	2018	Christos Gage	Jorge Molina
"Hunted"	The Amazing Spider-Man (vol. 5) #16–23	February – June 2019	Nick Spencer	Humberto Ramos; Ryan Ottley
"Absolute Carnage"	Various	August 2019	Donny Cates	Ryan Stegman
"Sins Rising"		2020		
"Last Remains"		2020		
"Sinister War"		2021		
"Dark Web"		2022		
"End of the Spider-Verse"		2022		
"Contest of Chaos"		2023		
"Gang War"		2023		
"Eight Deaths of Spider-Man"		2025		

== See also ==
- List of Spider-Man titles
- Spider-Man collected editions
