= List of Spider-Man comics =

This is a list of comic book series featuring the Marvel Comics superhero Spider-Man. Spider-Man first appeared in Amazing Fantasy #15, which was the last issue of that series. After that, he was given his own series. All stories presented in this list are published by Marvel Comics under their standard imprint, unless otherwise noted. The list is updated as of April 2025 and includes the Peter Parker, Ben Reilly, Miguel O'Hara, Miles Morales, and Otto Octavius versions of the character.

== Ongoing series ==
=== Mainstream continuity ===
Comic book series featuring Spider-Man include:

- The Amazing Spider-Man
  - #1–441 (March 1963 – November 1998). Also includes a #-1 issue (July 1997)
  - (vol. 2) #1–58 [#442-499], #500–700 (January 1999 – December 2012). Also includes issues numbered #654.1, 679.1, 699.1, 700.1–700.5
  - (vol. 3) #1–18 [#734-751] (April 2014 – August 2015). Also includes issues numbered #1.1–1.5 and #16.1–20.1
  - (vol. 4) #1–32 [#757-788], #789–801 (October 2015 – June 2018). Also includes issues numbered #1.1–1.6
  - (vol. 5) #1–93 [802-894] (July 2018 – March 2022). Also includes issues numbered #16.HU, 18–20.HU, 50–54.LR, 78.BEY, 80.BEY, 88.BEY, 92.BEY
  - (vol. 6) #1–70 [#895-964] (April 2022 – March 2025). Also includes issues numbered #65.DEATHS, 68.DEATHS
  - (vol. 7) #1–current [#965–current] (April 2025 – present)
  - Annuals #1–28, '96–2001, #35–42, 2015, 2017, 2018, 2018 (II), 2019, 2021, 2023 (1964–2023)
- Miles Morales: Spider-Man
  - #1–42 (December 2018 – September 2022), Annual #1 (2021)
  - (vol. 2) #1–current (December 2022 – present)

=== Other continuities ===
Spider-Man comic book series set in universes other than Earth-616:

- Ultimate Universe (Earth-6160)
  - Ultimate Spider-Man #1–current (January 2024 – present). Written by Jonathan Hickman and illustrated by Marco Checchetto. Set in the new Ultimate Marvel Universe and stars an older Peter Parker who becomes Spider-Man for the first time in his mid-30s, when he is already married to Mary Jane Watson and has two children, Richard and May.

=== Reprints ===
- Astonishing Spider-Man #1–current (Panini Comics/Marvel UK; November 1995 – present). Part of Marvel UK's "Collector Edition" line, reprinting U.S. stories from 2–3 years prior.

== Previous series ==
Spider-Man has also had a number of ongoing series that have since ended:

=== Mainstream continuity ===
- The Spectacular Spider-Man #1–2 (July–November 1968). A magazine format series. First issue was published in black-and-white.
- Marvel Team-Up
  - #1–150 (March 1972 – February 1985). A series that mostly featured Spider-Man paired with a different Marvel Comics superhero each month. Replaced by Web of Spider-Man in 1985.
  - Spider-Man Team-Up #1–7 (December 1995 – June 1997). Quarterly series.
  - Marvel Team-Up (vol. 2) #1–11 (September 1997 – March 1998). Monthly series replacing Spider-Man Team-Up. The first seven issues featured Spider-Man team-ups before switching over to Namor the Sub-Mariner.
  - Marvel Team-Up (vol. 3) #1–25 (January 2005 – December 2006). Features Spider-Man and other characters, with longer storylines than the previous volumes.
  - Marvel Team-Up (vol. 4) #1–6 (June 2019 – September 2019). First three issues featured Spider-Man.
  - Annuals #1–7 (1976 – 1984)
- Giant-Size Spider-Man #1–6 (July 1974 – September 1975). Part of the "Giant-Size" format that Marvel published from 1974 to 1976 that featured comics that were much larger than other Spider-Man books at the time and had multiple stories, with the second one usually being a reprint of an earlier Spider-Man story. Issue #6 was reprints only.
- Peter Parker, the Spectacular Spider-Man #1–263 (December 1976 – November 1998). Retitled The Spectacular Spider-Man (vol. 2) with issue #134 in 1988.
  - Peter Parker: Spider-Man (vol. 2) #1–57 (January 1999 – August 2003)
  - The Spectacular Spider-Man (vol. 3) #1–27 (September 2003 – June 2005). Replaced Peter Parker: Spider-Man (vol. 2).
  - Peter Parker, the Spectacular Spider-Man (vol. 2) #1–6, 297–313 (July 2017 – December 2018)
  - Annuals #1–14 (1979 – 1994), (vol. 2) #1 (2018)
- Web of Spider-Man #1–129 (April 1985 – September 1995). Replaced Marvel Team-Up as the third major Spider-Man comic book series at the time.
  - Web of Spider-Man (vol. 2) #1–12 (December 2009 – November 2010). A Spider-Man anthology title designed to deal with some of the ancillary characters in the Spider-verse. Replaced The Amazing Spider-Man Family.
  - Annuals #1–10 (1985 – 1994)
- Spider-Man
  - #1–98 (August 1990 – November 1998). A series initially created in 1991 for artist Todd McFarlane. Renamed Peter Parker: Spider-Man with issue #75.
  - (vol. 2) #1–21, 234–240 (April 2016 – July 2018). Stars Miles Morales. Legacy numbering was introduced from January 2018.
  - (vol. 3) #1–5 (November 2019 – December 2020). Out of continuity miniseries.
  - (vol. 4) #1–11 (December 2022 – October 2023)
- Spider-Man Unlimited #1–22 (May 1993 – November 1998). Quarterly series.
  - Spider-Man Unlimited (vol. 3) #1–15 (March 2004 – July 2006). A bimonthly series showcasing Spider-Man in stories by new writing talent.
- Untold Tales of Spider-Man #1–25 (September 1995 – September 1997). A series that told all-new stories set in the early days of Spider-Man's superhero career. Included a #-1 issue and two Annuals.
- The Sensational Spider-Man #0–33 (January 1996 – November 1998). Replaced Web of Spider-Man.
  - The Sensational Spider-Man (vol. 2) #23–41 (April 2006 – November 2007), Annual #1 (2007)
- Webspinners: Tales of Spider-Man #1–18 (January 1999 – June 2000). An anthology series with rotating creative teams telling stories from different time periods within Spider-Man's superhero career.
- Spider-Man's Tangled Web #1–22 (June 2001 – March 2003). An anthology series where new, alternative, and Vertigo comics creators were given a shot at telling stories featuring the character.
- Marvel Knights Spider-Man #1–22 (June 2004 – March 2006). Part of the Marvel Knights imprint intended to feature a more "mature" style.
- Friendly Neighborhood Spider-Man
  - #1–24 (October 2005 – October 2007)
  - (vol. 2) #1–14 (January – December 2019)
  - Annual #1 (2007)
- Spider-Man Family #1–9 (April 2007 – June 2008). A quarterly anthology series with new stories featuring Spider-Man and his supporting cast both past and present, reprints of classic Spider-Man tales, and an American translation of the original Japanese manga Spider-Man J.
  - The Amazing Spider-Man Family #1–8 (October 2008 – September 2009). A bimonthly anthology series with the stories set in the Brand New Day continuity. Also featured stories set in the MC2 universe.
- The Amazing Spider-Man Digital #1–17 (September 2009 – August 2010). An exclusive digital comics series – part of the Marvel Digital Comics line. Later compiled in the limited series Peter Parker #1–5.
- Avenging Spider-Man #1–22 (November 2011 – June 2013), Annual #1 (2012). A team-up book similar to Marvel Team-Up. Replaced by Superior Spider-Man Team-Up.
- The Superior Spider-Man #1–33 (January 2013 – August 2014), Annuals #1–2 (2014). Written by Dan Slott and featured Doctor Octopus whose mind had taken over Peter Parker's body, allowing him to take over Spider-Man's identity in an attempt to redeem himself. Replaced The Amazing Spider-Man throughout its run.
- Superior Spider-Man Team-Up #1–12 (July 2013 – April 2014). Replaced Avenging Spider-Man.
- The Superior Foes of Spider-Man #1–17 (July 2013 – November 2014). Written by Nick Spencer with artwork by Steve Lieber, and features a Sinister Six team led by Boomerang.
- Spider-Man/Deadpool #1–50 (January 2016 – May 2019). Features team-ups between Spider-Man and Deadpool.
- Spider-Man: Octo-Girl (vol. 1) #1–32 (June 2023 – January 2025)
- The Superior Spider-Man (vol. 3) #1–8 (January 2024 – August 2024)
- Featuring Miguel O'Hara, the Spider-Man of 2099
  - Spider-Man 2099. Features the Spider-Man of 2099, Miguel O'Hara, who has been trapped in the present.
    - (vol. 2) #1–12 (July 2014 – May 2015)
    - (vol. 3) #1–25 (December 2015 – July 2017)

=== Other continuities ===
Spider-Man comic book series set in alternate universes other than Earth-616:

- Marvel 2099 (Earth-928/Earth-616 circa 2099)
  - Spider-Man 2099 #1–46 (November 1992 – August 1996). Takes place in the year 2099, starring the Spider-Man of the future, Miguel O'Hara. Character moves to Earth-616 in (vol. 2).
  - Annual #1 (1994)
  - Spider-Man 2099: Exodus #1–5 (May – November 2022). Includes issues titled Alpha #1 and Omega #1.
- MC2 (Earth-982)
  - Spider-Girl #0–100 (October 1998 – September 2006). Sequel to What If? #105 (February 1998). Written by Tom DeFalco and illustrated by Ron Frenz. Set in an alternate future and starring Mayday Parker, Peter Parker and Mary Jane Watson-Parker's daughter.
  - The Amazing Spider-Girl #0–30 (October 2006 – February 2009). Character's adventures continued in Amazing Spider-Man Family #1–8.
- TV series continuities
  - Spidey Super Stories #1–57 (October 1974 – March 1982). Based on a live action recurring skit on the first version of the Children's Television Workshop TV series The Electric Company.
  - Spider-Man Adventures #1–15 (December 1994 – February 1996). Based on the 1990s animated TV series.
  - Adventures of Spider-Man #1–12 (April 1996 – March 1997). Continuation of above Adventures title.
  - Spider-Man Unlimited (vol. 2) #1–5, ½ (December 1999 – April 2000). Loosely based on the animated TV series of the same name.
  - Marvel Universe Ultimate Spider-Man #1–31 (April 2012 – October 2014). Set in the continuity of the Ultimate Spider-Man TV series.
  - Marvel Universe Ultimate Spider-Man: Web Warriors #1–12 (November 2014 – December 2015). Set in the continuity of the Ultimate Spider-Man TV series.
  - Marvel Universe Ultimate Spider-Man: Web Warriors – Spider-Verse #1–4 (November 2015 – February 2016)
  - Marvel Universe Ultimate Spider-Man vs. the Sinister Six #1–12 (September 2016 – September 2017)
- Marvel Adventures / Marvel Age (intended for younger audiences; outside the mainstream continuity)
  - Marvel Age Spider-Man #1–20 (March 2004 – February 2005)
  - Marvel Age Spider-Man Team-Up #1–5 (September 2004 – February 2005)
  - Marvel Adventures Spider-Man #1–61 (Marvel Adventures; May 2005 – May 2010). Continuation of Marvel Age Spider-Man. Written and penciled by various contributors. Set in its own continuity during Spider-Man's high school years, but never referred to in other series.
  - Marvel Adventures: The Avengers #1–39 (Marvel Adventures; July 2006 – October 2009). Written by Jeff Parker and penciled by various artists. Set in its own continuity.
  - Spider-Man: Marvel Adventures #1–24 (Marvel Adventures; May 2010 – April 2012). Written by Paul Tobin with various artists. Set during Spider-Man's high school years.
  - Spectacular Spider-Man Adventures #52–226 [Marvel UK] (September 1999 – September 2011). #1–51 were reprints. Relaunched as the reprint series Spider-Man Adventures.
  - Spider-Man Magazine #261–400 [Marvel UK] (October 2013 – October 2021). Continued numbering from Ultimate Spider-Man Magazine. Previous issues were reprints.
- Ultimate Marvel (Earth-1610)
  - Ultimate Spider-Man #1–133, 1/2 (October 2000 – June 2009), Annual #1–3 (2005 – 2008). Written by Brian Michael Bendis and penciled by Mark Bagley, Stuart Immonen, and David Lafuente. Set in the Ultimate Marvel Universe.
    - Ultimate Comics: Spider-Man #1–15, 150–160 (August 2010 – June 2011) (sometimes referenced as Ultimate Spider-Man (vol. 2)). Renumbered back to #150 after #15.
    - Ultimate Comics: Spider-Man (vol. 2) #1–28, 16.1, 200 (September 2011 – April 2014). Written by Brian Michael Bendis with art first by Sara Pichelli, then by David Marquez. Set in the Ultimate Marvel Universe.
    - Miles Morales: The Ultimate Spider-Man #1–12 (May 2014 – April 2015). Written by Brian Michael Bendis with art by David Marquez. Set in the Ultimate Marvel Universe.
  - Ultimate Marvel Team-Up #1–16 (Ultimate Marvel; April 2001 – July 2002). Similar to the Marvel Team-Up series, but set in the Ultimate Marvel Universe.
  - All-New Ultimates #1–12 (April 2014 – January 2015). By writer Michel Fiffe and artist Amilcar Pinna. Set in the Ultimate Marvel universe and featuring Miles Morales, the Ultimate Spider-Man.
- Spider-Man Loves Mary Jane #1–20 (February 2006 – September 2007). Sequel to the Mary Jane and Mary Jane: Homecoming miniseries. Set outside the mainstream Marvel Universe continuity.
- Spider-Gwen #1–5 (February – June 2015)
- Spidey #1–12 (December 2015 – November 2016). New stories featuring the young Peter Parker as Spider-Man.
- Amazing Spider-Man: Renew Your Vows #1–5 (June – September 2015); (vol. 2) #1–23 (November 2016 – September 2018). Set in Earth-18119 and tells stories involving Spider-Man, Mary Jane and their daughter, Annie Parker.

=== Reprint series ===
- Marvel Tales #3–291 (July 1966 – November 1994)
- Spider-Man Comics Weekly #1–666 [Marvel UK, black-and-white reprints] (February 1973 – December 1985)
- Spider-Man Comics Magazine #1–13 (January 1987 – 1988)
- Spider-Man Classics #1–16 (April 1993 – July 1994)
- Spectacular Spider-Man Adventures #1–51 [Marvel UK] (November 1995 – September 1999). Issue #52 onwards was original material.
- Spider-Man Magazine #227–254 [Marvel UK] (October 2011 – May 2013). Continued numbering from Spectacular Spider-Man Adventures.
- Ultimate Spider-Man Magazine #255–260 [Marvel UK] (May – September 2013). Continued numbering from Spider-Man Magazine.

== Miniseries ==
=== Mainstream continuity ===
- The Deadly Foes of Spider-Man #1–4 (May – August 1991). The first Spider-Man miniseries of them all. Written by Danny Fingeroth with artwork by Al Milgrom and Kerry Gammill.
- The Lethal Foes of Spider-Man #1–4 (September – December 1993). The sequel miniseries to The Deadly Foes of Spider-Man.
- Spider-Man: The Mutant Agenda #0–3 (February – May 1994)
- Spider-Man/X-Factor: Shadowgames #1–3 (May – July 1994)
- Spider-Man: Web of Doom #1–3 (August – October 1994)
- Spider-Man: The Arachnis Project #1–6 (August 1994 – January 1995)
- Spider-Man: Friends and Enemies #1–4 (January – April 1995)
- Spider-Man: Power of Terror #1–4 (January – April 1995)
- Spider-Man: Funeral for an Octopus #1–3 (March – May 1995)
- Spider-Man: The Final Adventure #1–4 (November 1995 – February 1996)
- Spider-Man: The Lost Years #1–3, 0 (August – October 1995, January 1996). Issue #0 is reprint material only.
- Spider-Man/Punisher: Family Plot #1–2 (February – March 1996)
- Spider-Man: Redemption #1–4 (September – December 1996). Sequel miniseries to Spider-Man: The Lost Years set in the then-present day.
- Spider-Man: Hobgoblin Lives #1–3 (January – March 1997)
- Spider-Man: Death and Destiny #1–3 (August – October 2000)
- Spider-Man: Revenge of the Green Goblin #1–3 (October – December 2000)
- Spider-Man: The Mysterio Manifesto #1–3 (January – March 2001)
- Daredevil/Spider-Man #1–4 (Marvel Knights; January – April 2001)
- Spider-Man: Lifeline #1–3 (April – June 2001)
- Spider-Man: Quality of Life #1–4 (July – October 2002)
- Spider-Man: Blue #1–6 (July 2002 – April 2003)
- Spider-Man's Get Kraven #1–6 (August 2002 – January 2003)
- Spider-Man/Black Cat: The Evil that Men Do #1–6 (Marvel Knights; August 2002 – January 2006)
- Spider-Man/Wolverine #1–4 (Marvel Knights; August–November 2003). Not to be confused with the Spider-Man vs. Wolverine one-shot (February 1987).
- Spider-Man/Doctor Octopus: Negative Exposure #1–5 (December 2003 – April 2004)
- Spider-Man/Doctor Octopus: Out of Reach #1–5 (January – May 2004)
- Spider-Man/Doctor Octopus: Year One #1–5 (August – December 2004)
- Spider-Man/Human Torch #1–5 (March – July 2005). Published in digest form as Spider-Man/Human Torch: I'm With Stupid.
- Spider-Man: Breakout #1–5 (June – October 2005)
- Spider-Man and the Fantastic Four #1–4 (June – September 2007)
- Spider-Man: With Great Power #1–5 (March – September 2008)
- The Amazing Spider-Man: Extra! #1–3 (September 2008 – May 2009)
- Secret Invasion: The Amazing Spider-Man #1–3 (October – December 2008)
- X-Men and Spider-Man #1–4 (January – April 2009)
- Spider-Man: Secret Wars #1–4 (2010)
- Spider-Man: Fever #1–3 (June – August 2010)
- Astonishing Spider-Man and Wolverine #1–6 (July 2010 – June 2011)
- Peter Parker #1–5 (May – September 2010)
- World War Hulks: Spider-Man vs. Thor #1–2 (September 2010)
- Spider-Man and the Fantastic Four (vol. 2) #1–4 (September – December 2010)
- Fear Itself: Spider-Man #1–3 (July – September 2011)
- Spider-Men #1–5 (crossover with Ultimate Marvel; June – September 2012)
- Marvel Knights: Spider-Man (vol. 2) #1–5 (December 2013 – April 2014)
- The Amazing Spider-Man: Who Am I? #1–4 (May 2014). Part of Marvel's Infinity Comics webcomic line.
- Spider-Verse #1–2 (November 2014 – January 2015)
- Spider-Verse Team-Up #1–3 (November 2014 – January 2015)
- Scarlet Spiders #1–3 (November 2014 – January 2015)
- Spider-Man and the X-Men #1–6 (December 2014 – April 2015)
- Clone Conspiracy #1–5 (December 2016 – April 2017)
- Amazing Spider-Man & Silk: The Spider(fly) Effect #1–4 (May – November 2016)
- Civil War II: Amazing Spider-Man #1–4 (August – November 2016)
- Spider-Men II #1–5 (September 2017 – February 2018)
- Symbiote Spider-Man #1–5 (June – October 2019)
- War of the Realms: Spider-Man & the League of Realms #1–3 (July – August 2019)
- Absolute Carnage: Miles Morales #1–3 (August – October 2019)
- Symbiote Spider-Man: Alien Reality #1–5 (December 2019 – April 2020)
- Amazing Spider-Man: The Daily Bugle #1–2 (January – February 2020)
- Symbiote Spider-Man: King in Black #1–5 (November 2020 – March 2021)
- Symbiote Spider-Man: Crossroads #1–5 (July – November 2021)
- Non-Stop Spider-Man #1–5 (March – September 2021).
- What If...? Miles Morales #1–5 (March – July 2022)
- Ben Reilly: Spider-Man #1–5 (January – May 2022)
- Spine-Tingling Spider-Man # 0-4 (October 2021 – February 2022). Part of Marvel's Infinity Comics webcomic line.
- Savage Spider-Man #1–5 (February – June 2022)
- Deadly Neighborhood Spider-Man #1–5 (December 2022 – April 2023)
- Spider-Man: The Lost Hunt #1–5 (January – May 2023)

=== Intercompany crossovers ===
- The Transformers #3 (December 1984)
- Backlash/Spider-Man #1–2 (Image Comics; August – September 1996)
- Spider-Man/Badrock #1A–1B (Maximum Press; March 1997)
- Spider-Man/Red Sonja #1–5 (Dynamite Entertainment; October 2007 – February 2008)

=== Other continuities ===
- Spider-Man: Chapter One #1–6, 0, 7–12 (December 1998 – October 1999)
- Spider-Man: Legend of the Spider-Clan #1–5 (December 2002 – April 2003)
- Trouble #1–5 (Epic Comics; September 2003 – January 2004)
- Spider-Man India #1–4 (January – April 2005)
- Spider-Man: House of M #1–5 (August – December 2005). Takes place in the House of M alternate universe; however, the Peter Parker of the mainstream Marvel Universe of Earth-616 retained memories of his time there.
- Spider-Man and Power Pack #1–4 (January – April 2007)
- Spider-Man: Reign #1–4 (February – May 2007)
- Spider-Man: Fairy Tales #1–4 (July – October 2007)
- Spider-Man Noir #1–4 (February – May 2009)
- Ultimatum: Spider-Man Requiem #1–2 (Ultimate Marvel; August – September 2009).
- Spider-Man: The Clone Saga #1–6 (November 2009 – April 2010)
- Spider-Man 1602 #1–5 (December 2009 – April 2010)
- Spider-Man Noir: Eyes without a Face #1–4 (March – June 2010)
- Cataclysm: Ultimate Spider-Man #1–3 (January – March 2014)
- Edge of Spider-Verse #1–5 (September – October 2014)
- Spider-Verse #1–2 (November – December 2014)
- Spider-Verse (vol. 2) #1–5 (May – September 2015)
- Edge of Spider-Geddon #1–4 (October – November 2018)
- Spider-Man: Life Story #1–6 (May – October 2019), Annual #1 (2021)
- Spider-Verse (vol. 3) #1–6 (October 2019 – March 2020)
- Spider-Man & Venom: Double Trouble #1–4 (November 2019 – February 2020)
- Spider-Man Noir (vol. 2) #1–5 (March – October 2020)
- Spider-Man: Spider’s Shadow #1–5 (April – August 2021)
- Spider-Punk #1–5 (April – September 2022)
- Edge of Spider-Verse (vol. 2) #1–5 (August – October 2022)
- Peter Parker & Miles Morales: Spider-Men – Double Trouble #1–4 (November 2022 – February 2023)
- Edge of Spider-Verse (vol. 3) #1–5 (May – July 2023)

== One-shots ==
=== Mainstream continuity ===
- Giant-Size Super-Heroes #1 (June 1974). A second issue of this series was announced but never published.
- Spider-Man, Storm and Power Man (June 1982)
- Spider-Man vs. Wolverine (February 1987)
- Spider-Man Special Edition: The Trial of Venom (December 1992)
- The Amazing Spider-Man: Soul of the Hunter (August 1992). Sequel to the Spider-Man crossover event "Fearful Symmetry: Kraven's Last Hunt" (see Crossover events below).
- Spider-Man/Dr. Strange: The Way to Dusty Death (1992)
- The Amazing Spider-Man: Skating on Thin Ice (January 1993)
- Spider-Man/Punisher/Sabretooth: Designer Genes (1993)
- Spider-Man: Bug Stops Here #1 (1994)
- Spider-Man vs. Dracula (January 1994). Reprint of Giant-Size Spider-Man #1 (July 1974).
- Spider-Man 2099 Meets Spider-Man (1995)
- Spider-Man Versus Wolverine (March 1995) – Originally published in Marvel Comics Presents #'s: 48, 49, 50.
- Amazing Spider-Man Super Special #1 – Planet of the Symbiotes: Part 1 of 5 (June 1995)
- Spider-Man Super Special #1 – Planet of the Symbiotes: Part 2 of 5 (July 1995)
- Venom Super Special #1 – Planet of the Symbiotes: Part 3 of 5 (August 1995)
- Spectacular Spider-Man Super Special #1 – Planet of the Symbiotes: Part 4 of 5 (September 1995)
- Web of Spider-Man Super Special #1 – Planet of the Symbiotes: Part 5 of 5 (October 1995)
- Spider-Man: The Jackal Files (August 1995)
- Spider-Man: Maximum Clonage Alpha (August 1995)
- Spider-Man: Maximum Clonage Omega (August 1995)
- Spider-Man: The Parker Years (November 1995)
- Spider-Man Holiday Special 1995 (1995)
- Spider-Man: Legacy of Evil (June 1996)
- Spider-Man: The Osborn Journal (February 1997)
- Spider-Man: Dead Man's Hand (April 1997)
- Spider-Man/Kingpin: To the Death (1997)
- Spider-Man: The Venom Agenda (January 1998)
- Spider-Man: Made Men (August 1998)
- Untold Tales of Spider-Man: Strange Encounter (1998)
- Spider-Man vs. the Punisher (July 2000)
- Spider-Man/Marrow (February 2001)
- Sentry/Spider-Man (February 2001)
- Spider-Man: Sweet Charity (August 2002)
- Spider-Man/Daredevil (October 2002). Not to be confused with the Spider-Man/Daredevil miniseries.
- Spider-Man Team-Up Special (May 2005)
- Spider-Man: Family (October 2005). Not to be confused with the later series of the same title.
- I ♥ Marvel: Web of Romance (February 2006)
- Spider-Man & Araňa Special: The Hunter Revealed (May 2006)
- Spider-Man Family Featuring Amazing Friends (October 2006)
- Spider-Man: Black and Blue and Read All Over (November 2006)
- Fallen Son: Spider-Man (July 2007). Spider-Man's segment in Fallen Son: The Death of Captain America.
- Spider-Man: Swing Shift Director's Cut (February 2008)
- Spider-Man: Fear Itself (March 2009). Not to be confused with a Spider-Man graphic novel of the same title.
- Spider-Man & the Human Torch in...Bahía de los Muertos! (May 2009)
- Spider-Man: Short Halloween (July 2009)
- Timestorm 2009-2099: Spider-Man (August 2009)
- Spider-Man: A Chemical Romance #1 (November 2009)
- Dark Reign: The List – Spider-Man (January 2010)
- Siege: Spider-Man (June 2010)
- Spider-Man: Origin of the Hunter (June 2010)
- The Many Loves of the Amazing Spider-Man (July 2010)
- Spider-Man: Back in Quack (November 2010)
- Shadowland: Spider-Man (November 2010)
- Spider-Man vs. Vampires (December 2010)
- Spider-Man: A Meal to Die For #1 (April 2011) Co-starring celebrity chef Eli Kirshstein from Top Chef.
- Spectacular Spider-Man #1000 (June 2011)
- The Amazing Spider-Man: Ends of the Earth (July 2012)
- Superior Spider-Man Team-Up Special #1 (December 2013)
- Inhumanity: Superior Spider-Man #1 (January 2014)
- Clone Conspiracy Omega #1 (May 2017)
- Generations: Miles Morales Spider-Man & Peter Parker Spider-Man #1 (September 2017)
- Amazing Spider-Man: Venom Inc. Alpha #1 (February 2018)
- Amazing Spider-Man: Venom Inc. Omega #1 (March 2018)
- The Amazing Spider-Man: Wakanda Forever #1 (June 2018)
- Superior Octopus #1 (October 2018)
- Typhoid Fever: Spider-Man #1 (December 2018)
- Marvel Tales: Spider-Man #1 (June 2019)
- Spider-Man: Reptilian Rage #1 (June 2019)
- Sensational Spider-Man: Self-Improvement #1 (August 2019)
- Absolute Carnage: Symbiote Spider-Man #1 (September 2019)
- Amazing Spider-Man: Going Big #1 (September 2019)
- Amazing Spider-Man: Full Circle #1 (October 2019)
- Red Goblin: Red Death #1 (October 2019)
- Amazing Spider-Man: Sins Rising Prelude #1 (July 2020)
- Amazing Spider-Man: The Sins of Norman Osborn #1 (September 2020)
- Marvels Snapshots: Spider-Man #1 (December 2020)
- King in Black: Spider-Man #1 (March 2021)
- Spider-Man: Curse of the Man-Thing #1 (April 2021)
- Giant-Size Amazing Spider-Man: King's Ransom #1 (May 2021)
- Giant-Size Amazing Spider-Man: Chameleon Conspiracy #1 (August 2021)
- The Death of Doctor Strange: Spider-Man #1 (December 2021)
- Darkhold: Spider-Man #1 (December 2021)
- Devil's Reign: Spider-Man #1 (March 2022)
- Murderworld: Spider-Man #1 (December 2022)
- Dark Web #1 (February 2023)
- Dark Web Finale #1 (April 2023)
- Spider-Man: Unforgiven #1 (May 2023)

=== Graphic novels ===
- Marvel Graphic Novel No. 22 – The Amazing Spider-Man: Hooky (1986) (ISBN 8439508662)
- Marvel Graphic Novel No. 46 – The Amazing Spider-Man: Parallel Lives (1989) (ISBN 0871355736)
- Marvel Graphic Novel No. 63 – The Amazing Spider-Man: Spirits of the Earth (1990) (ISBN 0871356929)
- Spider-Man: Season One (2012) (ISBN 978-0785158202) Also includes Avenging Spider-Man #1. Reprinted as Spider-Man: Amazing Origins (ISBN 978-0785158219) with the reprint of Avenging Spider-Man #1 replaced by Spidey #1.
- Amazing Spider-Man: Family Business (2014) (ISBN 978-0785184409)

=== Intercompany crossovers ===
- Superman vs. The Amazing Spider-Man (March 1976). Non-canonical.
- Superman and Spider-Man (July 1981). Non-canonical.
- Spider-Man and Batman: Disordered Minds (September 1995). Semi-canonical with DC vs. Marvel #1–4 (April-May 1996); it was briefly mentioned as having happened in issue #1.
- Backlash/Spider-Man #1–2 (July – October 1996)
- Spider-Man/Gen^{13} (November 1996). Non-canonical.
- Batman & Spider-Man: New Age Dawning (October 1998). Semi-canonical with Unlimited Access #1–4 (December 1997-March 1998); it was briefly mentioned as having happened in issue #1.

=== Other continuities ===
- Amazing Spider-Man vs. The Prodigy #1 (1976). This one-shot PSA was jointly released by Marvel Comics and Planned Parenthood.
- Spider-Man and His Amazing Friends #1 (December 1981)
- Spider-Man, Fire-Star and Iceman at The Dallas Ballet Nutcracker #1 (1983). This comic was an advertising insert in the Dallas Times Herald.
- The Dallas Cowboys and Spider-Man #1 (1983). This comic was an advertising insert in the Dallas Times Herald.
- Spider-Man Firestar Iceman Danger in Denver #1 (1983). This comic was an advertising insert in The Denver Post.
- Spider-Man and Power Pack #1 (November 1984). This one-shot PSA was jointly released by Marvel Comics and National Committee for Prevention of Child Abuse.
- Spider-Man and Verbal Abuse #1 (1987). This one-shot PSA was jointly released by Marvel Comics and National Committee for Prevention of Child Abuse and sponsored by 7-Eleven.
- Spider-Man and the New Mutants #1 (January 1990). This one-shot PSA was jointly released by Marvel Comics and National Committee for Prevention of Child Abuse and sponsored by K-Mart.
- Spider-Man: 101 Ways to End the Clone Saga (January 1997). Parody.
- Marvels Comics: Spider-Man #1 (July 2000)
- Giant Size Mini-Marvels Starring Spidey #1 (February 2002)
- Spider-Man: The Official Movie Adaptation #1 (June 2002)
- Startling Stories: Megalomaniacal Spider-Man (June 2002). Satire; as of 2016, this is the worst-selling Spider-Man comic book to date.
- Ultimate Spider-Man Super Special (Ultimate Marvel; July 2002). Conclusion to Ultimate Marvel Team-Up.
- The Marvelous Adventures of Gus Beezer with Spider-Man (May 2003)
- The Marvelous Adventures of Gus Beezer and Spider-Man (February 2004)
- Spider-Man 2: The Movie #1 (2004)
- What If Aunt May Had Died Instead of Uncle Ben? #1 (February 2005)
- Spider-Man Team-Up Special #1 (May 2005)
- Marvel MegaMorphs: Spider-Man #1 (August 2005)
- Stan Lee Meets Spider-Man (November 2006)
- Spider-Man Family Featuring Spider-Clan (November 2006)
- What If? Spider-Man: The Other #1 (January 2007)
- Spider-Man Mythos (August 2007)
- Spider-Man 3: The Black #1 (November 2007)
- What If? Spider-Man vs. Wolverine #1 (March 2008)
- King-Size Spider-Man Summer Special #1 (August 2008)
- What If? Spider-Man: Back in Black #1 (February 2009)
- What If? Spider-Man: House of M #1 (February 2010)
- Spider-Man: You're Hired! (May 2011)
- The Amazing Spider-Man: The Movie #1–2 (August 2012)
- The Amazing Spider-Man 2 #1 (October 2014)
- Marvel Universe Ultimate Spider-Man: Contest of Champions #1 (April 2016)
- Marvel's Spider-Man: Homecoming Prelude #1–2 (May – June 2017)
- Heroes Reborn: Peter Parker, The Amazing Shutterbug #1 (May 2021)

== Starring roles in anthology series ==
=== Mainstream continuity ===
- Amazing Fantasy #15 (August 1962)
- Marvel Super-Heroes #14 (May 1968)
- What If? #1 (February 1977), 7 (February 1978), 19 (February 1980), 24 (December 1980), 30 (December 1981) and 46 (August 1984)
- Marvel Fanfare #1–2 (March – May 1982)
- Marvel Comics Presents #48–50 (April – May 1990)

=== Crossovers ===
- Marvel Treasury Edition #28 (1981)
- Avengers (1991–present)
- The Infinity War #1 and 2 (1991)
- The Infinity Gauntlet (1991)
- Civil War (2006–2007)
- Secret Invasion (2008)
- Infinity (2013)
- Spider-Verse (2014–present)
- Secret Wars (2015–2016)
- Civil War II (2016)
- Secret Empire (2017)
- Monsters Unleashed (2017)
- Spider-Geddon (2018)

== Guides and reference materials ==
- Official Marvel Index to The Amazing Spider-Man #19 (April – December 1985)
- Official Marvel Index to Marvel Team-Up #1–6 (January 1986 – July 1987)
- Spider-Man Saga #1–4 (November 1991 – February 1992)
- Spider-Man: Collector's Preview (December 1994)
- Spider-Man: The Clone Journal (March 1995)
- Spider-Man Unmasked (November 1996)
- Peter and Mary Jane's Spider-Man Scrapbook (February 2000)
- Marvel Encyclopedia: Spider-Man (November 2003)
- Official Handbook of the Marvel Universe: Spider-Man 2004 (2004)
- Official Handbook of the Marvel Universe: Spider-Man 2005 (2005)
- Marvel Spotlight: Spider-Man – Back in Black (2007)
- Marvel Spotlight: Spider-Man – One More Day/Brand New Day (2007)
- Marvel Spotlight: Spider-Man – Brand New Day (2008)
- Spider-Man: Brand New Day Yearbook (2008)
- Official Index to the Marvel Universe #1–14 (February 2009 – March 2010)
- Amazing Spider-Man: Grim Hunt – The Kraven Saga (May 2010)
- Spider-Man Saga (December 2010)

== Crossover events ==
- "Fearful Symmetry: Kraven's Last Hunt" – Web of Spider-Man #31–32; Amazing Spider-Man #293–294; Spectacular Spider-Man #131–132
- "Spidey's Totally Tiny Adventure" – Amazing Spider-Man Annual #24; Spectacular Spider-Man Annual #10; Web of Spider-Man Annual #6
- "Maximum Carnage" – Amazing Spider-Man #378–380; Spectacular Spider-Man #201–203; Spider-Man #35–37; Spider-Man Unlimited #1–2; Web of Spider-Man #101–103
- "The Clone Saga" – Encompassing almost every Spider-Man comic over the course of two years (1994–1996).
- "Identity Crisis" – Spider-Man adopts four new identities. Takes place in Amazing Spider-Man #434–435; Spectacular Spider-Man #257–258; Sensational Spider-Man #27–28; Spider-Man #91–92.
- "The Gathering of Five" – Sensational Spider-Man #32–33; Amazing Spider-Man #440; Spider-Man #96; Spectacular Spider-Man #262
- "The Final Chapter" – Amazing Spider-Man #441; Spider-Man #97–98; Spectacular Spider-Man #263
- "Spider-Man: The Other" – Friendly Neighborhood Spider-Man #1–4; Marvel Knights Spider-Man #19–22; Amazing Spider-Man #525–528
- "Spider-Man: One More Day" – Amazing Spider-Man #544–545; Friendly Neighborhood Spider-Man #24; Sensational Spider-Man (vol. 2) #41

== Collected editions ==
See: Spider-Man collected editions

== See also ==
- List of The Amazing Spider-Man issues
- List of Spider-Man storylines
- List of Venom titles
- List of Punisher titles
- List of Deadpool titles
