= Billy Connors (character) =

- Billy Connors as Lizard Jr. as seen in The Amazing Spider-Man (vol. 5) #16 (April 2019). Art by Alberto Jiménez Alburquerque (penciller/inker) and Laura Martin, Brian Reber, and Carlos Lopez (colorists).

Publication information
- Publisher: Marvel Comics
- First appearance: The Amazing Spider-Man #6 (Nov. 1963)
- Created by: Stan Lee (writer); Steve Ditko (artist)

In-story information
- Alter ego: William Connors
- Species: Human mutate
- Notable aliases: Lizard Jr. Lizard Boy
- Abilities: As a lizard: Superhuman strength, speed, agility, stamina, durability, and reflexes; Regenerative healing factor; Hardened scale-like skin; Razor-sharp claws and teeth; Powerful tail

William Connors is a fictional character appearing in American comic books published by Marvel Comics. He is usually depicted as a supporting character of Spider-Man, and the son of Dr. Curt Connors, also known as the Lizard. Much of his character's story deals with the trauma of his father's uncontrollable powers. Billy was later injected with Curt's Lizard Formula to cure him of a deadly virus, which mutated him into a lizard-like form.

== Publication history ==
The character was created by Stan Lee and Steve Ditko and first appeared in The Amazing Spider-Man #6 (November 1963).

== Fictional character biography ==
Billy was born in Florida to Curt and Martha Connors. The family move to New York City so that Curt can continue his research in limb regrowth. Curt's research leads him to transform himself into a reptilian creature called the Lizard, who attempts to kill Billy. Curt eventually chooses to leave his family, saddening Billy and Martha. Curt later returns and turns Billy into another lizard creature dubbed Lizard Jr., but the two are captured and returned to normal by Spider-Man.

Sometime later, Martha and Billy contract cancer after being exposed to carcinogenic chemicals. Martha dies, while Billy survives and is forced to live with his aunt. During the storyline The Gauntlet and Grim Hunt, Curt loses custody of Billy, who the Lizard kills in an attempt to suppress Curt's personality.

In the Dead No More: The Clone Conspiracy storyline, Ben Reilly resurrects Billy and Martha in clone bodies to motivate Curt to work for him. The two are later infected with the Carrion virus, which threatens to degrade their bodies. Curt injects them with his Lizard formula, transforming them into reptilian creatures like himself, to save their lives.

While Billy and his family live peacefully in the sewers, getting occasional friendly visits from Peter Parker and Mary Jane Watson, he longs to return to the surface and attend a regular school. Despite this, his father angrily rebuffs his pleas and he, in turn, has started to rebel. An amnesiac Billy joins Squid Kid's Sinister Six as Lizard Boy.

== In other media ==
=== Television ===
- A character based on Billy Connors named Billy Conner appears in Spider-Man (1967), voiced by Billie Mae Richards.
- Billy Connors appears in Spider-Man: The Animated Series, voiced by Toby Scott Ganger.
- Billy Connors appears in The Spectacular Spider-Man, voiced by Max Burkholder.

=== Film ===
Billy Connors appears in a deleted scene that was cut from The Amazing Spider-Man, portrayed by Miles Elliot.
