= Martha Connors =

Marvel Comics character

- Martha Connors

Publication information
- Publisher: Marvel Comics
- First appearance: The Amazing Spider-Man #6 (Nov. 1963)
- Created by: Stan Lee (writer); Steve Ditko (artist)

In-story information
- Species: Human mutate
- Abilities: As a lizard: Superhuman strength, speed, agility, stamina, durability, and reflexes; Regenerative healing factor; Hardened scale-like skin; Razor-sharp claws and teeth; Powerful tail

Martha Connors is a fictional character appearing in American comic books published by Marvel Comics. She is usually depicted as a supporting character of Spider-Man, and the wife of Dr. Curt Connors, also known as the Lizard. Much of her character's story revolves around her constant suffering, yet perseverance through her husband's constant transformations. Martha was later injected with Curt's Lizard Formula to cure her of a deadly virus, which mutated her into a lizard-like form.

== Publication history ==
The character was created by Stan Lee and Steve Ditko and first appeared in The Amazing Spider-Man #6 (November 1963).

== Fictional character biography ==
Sometime before her first appearance, Martha met and married surgeon and biologist Curt Connors. Together they had a son named Billy and their life seemed perfect. Curt, an amputee, sought a way to regrow lost limbs. Despite Martha warning him about the dangers of experimenting on himself, fearing for his safety, Curt creates a Lizard Formula and tests it on himself, transforming into a feral reptilian monster. Curt is eventually cured, but continues to transform periodically. However, Martha refuses to leave him.

Sometime later, Billy and Martha are both afflicted with cancer after being exposed to carcinogenic chemicals. Billy survives, while Martha dies due to complications from surgery, with Billy being sent to live with his aunt.

In the Dead No More: The Clone Conspiracy storyline, Martha is resurrected in a clone body by Ben Reilly along with Billy, who had previously been killed by the Lizard. Martha and Billy are taken away by Curt, who claims that he can cure the Carrion virus they are suffering from. Martha and Billy are injected with the Lizard Formula, which saves their lives, but also mutates them into lizard-like forms.

== In other media ==
=== Television ===
- A character based on Martha Connors named "Mrs. Conner" appears in Spider-Man (1967), voiced by Peg Dixon.
- A character based on Martha Connors named Margaret Connors appears in Spider-Man: The Animated Series, voiced by Giselle Loren.
- Martha Connors appears in The Spectacular Spider-Man, voiced by Kath Soucie. This version is a geneticist who works with Curt Connors at Empire State University until they are forced out by Miles Warren.

=== Film ===
Martha Connors was meant to appear in The Amazing Spider-Man, portrayed by Annie Parisse, before her scenes were cut from the final film.

=== Video games ===
Martha Connors makes a non-speaking cameo appearance in Spider-Man 2 via a photograph.
