= Spidey (comic book) =

Comic book series published by Marvel Comics

- Cover of Spidey #1

Publication information
- Publisher: Marvel Comics
- Format: Ongoing
- Publication date: 2015-2016
- No. of issues: 12
- Main character: Peter Parker

Creative team
- Written by: Robbie P. Thompson
- Artist(s): Nick Bradshaw (#1-3), Andre Lima Araujo (#4-7), Nathan Stockman (#8-12)
- Colorist(s): Jim Campbell (#1-3, 5-12), Rachelle Rosenberg (#4)

Spidey is a comic book series published by Marvel Comics. The series focuses on a young Peter Parker as opposed to the regular Spider-Man series.

== Reception ==
The series holds an average rating of 8.2 by 39 professional critics on the review aggregation website Comic Book Roundup.

== Prints ==
=== Issues ===
| Issue | Title | Antagonist | Release date |
|---|---|---|---|
| #1 | The Amazing Spider-Man | Doctor Octopus | December 2015 |
| #2 | Enter The Sandman | Sandman | December 2015 |
| #3 | —N/a | Lizard | February 2016 |
| #4 | Doomsday Off! | Doctor Doom | April 2016 |
| #5 | Dead Ends | Green Goblin | April 2016 |
| #6 | Making the Grade | Vulture | May 2016 |
| #7 | —N/a | Klaw | June 2016 |
| #8 | Blackout! | Electro | July 2016 |
| #9 | To Catch A Spider | Kraven the Hunter | August 2016 |
| #10 | Bad Reputation | M.O.D.O.K | September 2016 |
| #11 | Missing Out | Scorpion | October 2016 |
| #12 | Spidey No More | Sinister Six | November 2016 |

== Collected editions ==
| Title | Material collected | Publication date | ISBN |
|---|---|---|---|
| Spidey: All-New Marvel Treasury Edition | Spidey #1-3, Spider-Man (vol. 2) #1-2 | June 2016 | 978-1-302-90205-6 |
| Spidey Vol. 1: First Day | Spidey #1-6 | August 2016 | 978-0-7851-9675-4 |
| Spidey Vol. 2: After-School Special | Spidey #7-12 | January 2017 | 978-0-7851-9676-1 |
| Spidey: Freshman Year | Spidey #1-12 | April 2019 | 978-1-302-91655-8 |
