= Lizard (character) =

Marvel Comics character

The Lizard
- Textless cover of The Amazing Spider-Man #690 (July 2012), Art by Shane Davis

Publication information
- Publisher: Marvel Comics
- First appearance: The Amazing Spider-Man #6 (November 1963)
- Created by: Stan Lee; Steve Ditko

In-story information
- Alter ego: Curtis "Curt" Connors
- Species: Human mutate
- Team affiliations: Sinister Six; Sinister Twelve; Empire State University (ESU)
- Abilities: As Curt Connors: Genius-level intellect; As the Lizard: Superhuman strength, speed, agility, stamina, reflexes, and durability; Telepathic control over reptiles; Regeneration; Hardened fangs, claws, and scales; 6-foot-long prehensile tail with superhuman strength

The Lizard (Dr. Curtis "Curt" Connors) is a character appearing in American comic books published by Marvel Comics. Created by Stan Lee and Steve Ditko, he first appeared in The Amazing Spider-Man #6 (November 1963) as an enemy of the superhero Spider-Man. While the character has retained this role throughout most of his subsequent appearances, he has also been portrayed as a tragic antihero and occasional ally of Spider-Man. Connors is sometimes an ally of Spider-Man just as himself, and not necessarily as his alter ego.

In the original Earth-616 version of the story, Curt Connors was a geneticist researching the ability of certain reptiles to regrow missing limbs. He developed a lizard DNA-based serum that would allow humans to do the same, and tested it on himself, hoping to regain his missing right arm; instead, he transformed into a feral anthropomorphic lizard. Although Spider-Man was able to undo the transformation, the Lizard remained a part of Connors's subconscious and would resurface time and time again, often retaining Connors's intelligence and attempting to replace humankind with a race of reptilian creatures like himself. Many stories featuring the Lizard deal with the effects he has on Connors's life and psyche since the latter lives in constant fear that the Lizard will one day completely and irreversibly take over his body. Because of this, he works tirelessly to find a permanent cure for his alternate personality, much to the worry of his wife, Martha Connors, and son, Billy, but also standing in contrast to other Spider-Man foes who take pride in their powers and use them irresponsibly.

The character has appeared in numerous Spider-Man adaptations, including films, animated series, and video games. In live-action, Curt Connors was portrayed by Dylan Baker in Spider-Man 2 (2004) and Spider-Man 3 (2007), while Connors / Lizard is portrayed by Rhys Ifans in The Amazing Spider-Man (2012) and the Marvel Cinematic Universe (MCU) film Spider-Man: No Way Home (2021). In 2009, the Lizard was ranked IGN's 62nd Greatest Comic Villain of All Time.

== Publication history ==
The Lizard's debut in The Amazing Spider-Man #6, art by Steve Ditko

The Lizard first appeared in The Amazing Spider-Man #6 (November 1963), and was created by Stan Lee and Steve Ditko.

== Fictional character biography ==
=== Origin ===
Curtis "Curt" Connors was born in Coral Gables, Florida. He was a gifted surgeon who enlisted in the U.S. Army. He performed emergency battlefield surgery on wounded GIs. However, his right arm was injured in a wartime blast, resulting in its amputation.

After his return to civilian life as a research technologist, Connors became obsessed with uncovering the secrets of reptilian limb regeneration. Working from his home in the Florida Everglades with the help of war buddy Ted Sallis, he finally developed an experimental serum taken from reptilian DNA. The serum successfully regrew the missing limb of a rabbit, so then Connors chose to test the serum on himself. He ingested the formula and he did indeed grow a new arm.

However, the formula had an unfortunate side effect: Connors was subsequently transformed into a reptilian humanoid monster. Spider-Man discovered this situation during a trip to Florida to investigate newspaper reports of the Lizard after his employer the Daily Bugle challenged him. After discovering the Lizard's true identity and origin, Spider-Man used Connors's notes to create an antidote to restore him to his human form and mentality. Another attempt to develop this serum for safe use again resulted in Connors transforming into the Lizard, but on this occasion, he was saved thanks to his former colleague Professor X and his first team of X-Men, Beast and Angel tracking the Lizard down in the swamps so that the Iceman could send him into hibernation long enough to develop a cure.

=== Life in New York ===
Later, Curt Connors relocated to New York City attending Empire State University. He was able to repay Spider-Man by developing a formula to save May Parker's life after Peter Parker had given his aunt his radioactive blood during a transfusion, unintentionally putting her in mortal peril. It later became clear that the success of Connors's apparent cure from the Lizard persona was short-lived. A repeating pattern soon occurred, with stress or a chemical reaction turning Connors into the Lizard, Spider-Man fighting him, and then forcing him to swallow the antidote to reverse the transformation until the next time. A second personality had formed with the Lizard, one with the familiar goal shared by many villains of taking over the world. The Lizard envisioned a world where all humans had been transformed into (or replaced by) super-reptiles like himself. Despite the Lizard's overall hatred of humans, he was often shown to be unwilling to harm his wife Martha or young son Billy.

As Connors, he aided Spider-Man in defeating the Rhino by developing a formula to dissolve the Rhino's bulletproof hide, but accidentally transformed himself into the Lizard due to exposure to the chemicals needed to create the formula and was restored by Spider-Man. Connors was later abducted and forced to create a rejuvenation serum for Silvermane. However, the stress from this caused Connors to again transform; the Lizard then battled Spider-Man and the Human Torch, and was restored to normal once again by Spider-Man.

During another encounter with Spider-Man after Peter's attempts to remove his powers resulted in him growing four extra arms, a bite from Morbius endowed the Lizard with Connors's personality via the infection of a strange enzyme. Connors then synthesized an antidote for himself and Spider-Man using the Morbius enzyme. Curt Connors later aided Spider-Man, Ka-Zar, and Black Panther against Stegron. After the apparent death of the Jackal, Connors determined that Spider-Man was not a clone. Later, the Lizard battled both Stegron and Spider-Man after Stegron kidnapped Billy Connors. For a time, Peter Parker worked as a teaching assistant to Connors at Empire State University, although Connors had no idea that Peter was Spider-Man. During this time, Spider-Man and Connors dealt with one of Connors's previous experiments in the form of the Iguana.

During the first of the Secret Wars, the Lizard had reverted to his more primitive state and refused to participate on either side of the conflict. Although he was collected by the Beyonder along with other villains, he broke away from the main group after the first battle to settle in a swamp, where he befriended the Wasp, who had helped him treat an injury that he had sustained in the first battle. After the Lizard was blasted by the magic of the Enchantress, he reverted to human form.

After Connors's return from this event, his wife Martha, unable to take it anymore since Connors had said that he had been permanently cured, only to disappear for many days and then return home in tattered clothing with no plausible explanation as to where he had been, took their son Billy and separated from Curt. The Lizard had been affected by inter-dimensional teleportation so that Connors's mind presided over the Lizard, and he battled the Owl alongside Spider-Man. However, mystical activity during Inferno once again brought the Lizard's bestial nature to the fore, and Spider-Man cured him again.

=== The 1990s through 2007: Civil War ===
Connors then tried to straighten out his life and control the Lizard, with some degree of success. This ended when the villainess Calypso used her voodoo magic to take control of the Lizard (during the Torment storyline) for her purposes, reducing him to a mindless, savage state. After a series of bloody battles, the Lizard and Calypso were defeated by Spider-Man, and Spider-Man assumed that he perished under Calypso's spell. Connors once again gained control of the Lizard's mind and body, although it was very weak. Curt carried out a plan to cure himself temporarily, after which he voluntarily submitted to incarceration in the supervillain prison the Vault. When Calypso forces the transformation and attempted to control the Lizard once again, the creature killed her and escaped from the Vault. After this escape, the Lizard falls into a quicksand pit during a battle in the Everglades with Spider-Man and the bounty hunter Warrant and was believed to have died.

Later, a huge bestial Lizard appeared, shortly after Connors was called in to investigate Peter Parker's sudden sickness (the result of Peter's recently lost spider-powers returning). Spider-Man (Ben Reilly) realized that not only had the Lizard survived, but revealed later his new monstrous transformation seemed to be permanent and the personality of Curt Connors appeared completely lost. However, when this savage mindless Lizard later unexpectedly encountered Dr. Connors himself while Connors was helping Peter, Curt became the true Lizard once again and saved his family by killing the "Lizard-clone." It was revealed that the Lizard clone was a scientific accident resulting from an experimental formula being tested on a piece of the original Lizard's tail, which had then grown into a fully formed second creature.

Although reunited after Curt's apparent death, Martha and Billy were diagnosed with cancer after being exposed to carcinogens from living near an industrial lab in Florida. Spider-Man assisted Curt in successfully forcing Monnano, the lab's owner, to admit culpability, but Martha died from her cancer. Billy recovered but remained bitter towards his father. Curt's guilt and internalized anger led him to become the Lizard once again, and once human, Curt attempted a bank robbery so that he would be sent to prison. After a short-lived term, Connors was released and changed into the Lizard once more, this time due to a scheme by Norman Osborn to form the Sinister Twelve to kill Spider-Man. The Sinister Twelve were defeated and captured by the combined forces of Daredevil, the Fantastic Four, and the Avengers.

The Lizard resurfaced to face Spider-Man with the aid of Billy Connors, who was changed into an adolescent Lizard by his father. Both the Lizard and his son were captured and reverted. A new Sinister Six team, including new member the Lizard, appeared during the superhero Civil War, but it was stopped by Captain America and his Secret Avengers.

Post-Civil War, Curt Connors aided Spider-Man in developing a cure for the victims of Mister Hyde who were mutated with unstable versions of Spider-Man's powers. Dr. Connors has also monitored the progress of the hero Komodo, a female grad student who stole a sample of Connors's Lizard formula. She modified the formula for her own DNA to grow back her missing legs and to give herself reptilian powers.

=== Brand New Day (2008) and beyond ===
Doctor Curt Connors appeared in the 2008 Brand New Day storyline, where he experimented with animal stem cells as well as aiding forensic specialist Carlie Cooper. The third Freak mistook Connors's stem cells experiment for drugs. Connors helped Spider-Man defeat the Freak during their second encounter.

During the events of The Gauntlet, Curt Connors was working for the pharmaceutical company Phelcorp under executive Brian King. Connors had lost custody of his son, Billy, and started hearing the voice of the Lizard persona goading him to let it have control. After Connors's assistant slept with King, Connors began struggling to contain the Lizard, ultimately losing control when King stopped him from taking a dose of his Lizard suppressing antidote. When Connors changed into the Lizard, he devoured King as a rival male. Knowing that the Lizard has targeted Connors's son Billy in the past, Peter Parker decides to protect Billy and swings to his foster parents' home. There, he finds that Billy was kidnapped and his new parents are being held hostage by Ana Kravinoff. Ana had left Billy in an alley, where the Lizard ate him, the trauma of which functionally destroyed the Connors persona. No longer having Connors internally warring with the Lizard, he enters a metamorphosis, emerging in a new form, sporting a leaner physique, long brown spikes on its head, spikes on its right forearm, human intelligence, and the ability to telepathically communicate with the underdeveloped "lizard hindbrain" portion of human brains. He demonstrated the latter ability by triggering the instinctual prey response of Spider-man's lizard brain, temporarily overwhelming the superhero and causing him to flee in terror. Back on the street, the Lizard mentally triggered the lizard portion of numerous people's brains, causing them to behave in savage and often violent ways. Away from the Lizard, Spider-Man ingested Connors's Lizard suppressant formula, temporarily making him immune to the Lizard's mind controlling powers. Spider-Man then injected the Lizard with some of the formula, hoping that Connors would be able to resume control. Although Connors is no longer present, the formula does increase the prominence of the Lizard's "monkey brain", aka the human intelligence portion of its brain. This causes him to consider (and regret) some of his actions, including killing Billy and trying to make people embrace their lizard instincts. Reverting most of the people he had affected with his telepathic powers, The Lizard disappeared into the sewers after the fight.

During the Origin of the Species, the Lizard joined Doctor Octopus's supervillain team and stole Menace's baby. As Doctor Octopus and Spider-Man fought within the Lizard's hideout, the Lizard at first attacked Spider-Man, but then gladly returned the baby. He revealed that he already took a blood sample from the baby and found out that Norman Osborn was not the father; therefore, the baby was useless to him and all of the villains. Doctor Octopus, angry about the Lizard's hypnotism obstructing his intellect, attacked him while Spider-Man escaped with the baby. Both Doctor Octopus and the Lizard survived this fight.

A short time later, while investigating kidnappings in New York, the X-Men found themselves working with Spider-Man after they discovered that the abductor is the Lizard, who had been turning the victims into lizard people, while maintaining his control over the city's reptile population. The X-Men and Spider-Man discovered that the Lizard was being used by the Dark Beast, who had given the Lizard his 'reptilian shift' abilities by using a machine. During the battle, the Lizard shifted Gambit, Storm, and Wolverine into lizard people. Emma Frost and Spider-Man escaped the machine's effects, released the Lizard and used him to defeat the Dark Beast, who was arrested while the Lizard escaped.

Sometime later, Michael Morbius discovered that the Lizard had used DNA samples from Billy Connors' corpse to restore Curt Connors to humanity. Unfortunately, the Lizard's psyche was still present and was pretending to be Connors so that he would be left alone. The Lizard/Connors released blood into the air supply to provoke Morbius into attacking the other lab workers. The Lizard/Connors then tried to recreate his original Lizard formula so that he could change again, but Morbius' cure instead only allowed him to regrow his missing arm. The Lizard injected Max Modell and other Horizon Labs personnel with his formula to discover how to "cure" himself. Attempting to appear to be the "normal" Connors, the Lizard cut off his regrown limb, but began to appreciate human life, to the point that when he found the correct Lizard serum, he contemplated remaining human, but he took the cure when Spider-Man arrived and threatened him with custody. This resulted in yet another streamlined, new form. A new cure was developed for the lab employees that he had changed, but this formula failed on the Lizard's new form; he was instead knocked out and taken to the Raft. Visiting him in the Raft, Spider-Man was unaware that the serum had restored Connors' psyche and Connors remained in prison willingly, as he felt that he deserved it for his actions as the Lizard.

During the "Dying Wish" storyline, Peter Parker (whose mind was trapped within Doctor Octopus' dying body) was freed from the Raft by Trapster, Hydro-Man, and the Scorpion. Trapster offered to free the Lizard, but Connors declined. When Morbius managed to escape his cell, the Lizard pointed out that he still had nowhere to go. For unknown reasons, Morbius then freed the Lizard.

The Lizard was then seen back in his cell, being one of the few inmates left to be transported out of the decommissioned Raft. When Alistair Smythe attempted an escape from the Raft, he temporarily shut down the Raft's power, letting the Lizard out of his cell. The Lizard protected J. Jonah Jameson from the Scorpion, revealing that he had the mind of Curt Connors, and that he "will never let the monsters win again." Jameson defended the Lizard from the Raft's warden, calling him a hero, and protesting the use of a restraining device, though the Lizard himself preferred to be cautious. During Smythe's final escape attempt, the Lizard was impaled through the shoulder, but survived.

As part of the "All-New, All-Different Marvel" as part of the lead-up to the "Dead No More: The Clone Conspiracy" storyline, the Lizard was shown at the Andry Corrections Facility. He was escorted to the visitor's room and his restraints were removed. After the guards left the visitor's room, the Lizard met the mysterious red-suited man, who claims to have met Curt Connors before. The Lizard detected familiar scents accompanying the man, scents that could not be there, and warned him not to toy with the Lizard. The red-suited man replied that he was not the Lizard; inside he was Curt Connors, a model prisoner who saved Mayor J. Jonah Jameson and various civilians before and was trapped in a monster's body. The Lizard lashed out at him, demanding to know how can the people that he was smelling be there. The man said that the Lizard had abilities that he could use and if he escaped and joined him, he could give him anything. He snapped his fingers and Martha Connors and Billy Connors stepped forward, where they were somehow alive. The red-suited man asked if they have a deal. The Lizard tearfully accepted his deal. It was revealed that the revived Martha Connors and Billy Connors were clones that the red-suited man had gathered to grow clones with false memories that span all the way to their deaths. When Martha, Billy, and the other clones are infected with the Carrion virus, Lizard saves Martha and Billy by injecting them with the Lizard formula, turning his wife and son into lizard people like himself.

Connors was later shown having returned to Empire State University, now using a special chip implanted in the back of his neck to control his Lizard persona, with the chip acting as an inhibitor that stopped him from attacking humans. Teaching once again, Connors offered to support Peter Parker's efforts to re-apply for his doctorate after he was academically disgraced by accusations of plagiarism of Otto Octavius' thesis since Doctor Octopus' mind was in Peter's body at the time. The inhibitor proved to be a disadvantage when Connors' class was attacked by Taskmaster and Black Ant and he could not defend himself.

When Connors was captured by Kraven the Hunter as part of his organized hunt for various animal-themed villains, he was locked in a cell with Spider-Man while the two of them watched live footage of Black Cat and the Lizard-esque Billy Connors being hunted, with Billy admitting that he actually remembers his original death. Faced with a threat to his son, Connors asked Spider-Man to tear out the inhibitor chip so that he could rescue his son, despite the risk of this action leaving Connors paralyzed at best, the two unaware that Kraven had set the situation up precisely to force Spider-Man into a position where he would become the ruthless warrior that Kraven believes that he 'should' be. However, Connors managed to maintain control and retrieve Billy without killing anyone.

In a prelude to the "Sinister War" storyline, Doctor Octopus coerces Curt Connors into using the Isotope Genome Accelerator on himself, which separates him from his Lizard self and makes Lizard a separate being.

== Powers and abilities ==
Dr. Curtis Connors gave himself superhuman powers as a result of exposure to the Lizard Formula, allowing him to transform into the Lizard. In human form, he has none of his superhuman powers, but he is highly intelligent and a well known scientist in fields of genetics, physics, biochemistry, and herpetology.

When Connors is transformed into the Lizard, his strength is increased to superhuman levels. Likewise, his speed, stamina, agility, and reflexes are also raised to a level equivalent to that of Spider-Man. He can also scale walls using a combination of his sharp claws and micro-scales on his hands and feet that create molecular friction like those of a gecko. He is highly resistant to injury due to his thick scaly hide, allowing him to resist punctures and lacerations from ordinary weapons and lower-caliber firearms. In addition, the Lizard has highly enhanced healing abilities which allow him to quickly recover from grievous wounds, including regenerating lost limbs. He also has a powerful tail which he can whip at high speeds. The Lizard has razor-sharp teeth set in muscular jaws that can deal a lethal bite (the latter is established in the Lizard's later appearances; in his earlier appearances he seems to have no teeth at all). Like a reptile, he has cold-blooded characteristics and is therefore sensitive to drops in temperature; a sufficiently cold environment will cause his metabolism to slow drastically and become dormant if he is exposed to cold temperatures for too long.

The Lizard can mentally communicate and command all reptiles within a mile of himself via limited telepathy. He has also on at least one occasion secreted powerful pheromones which caused nearby humans to behave violently. Post-Brand New Day, a further enhancement of his telepathy granted him the power of telepathically compelling humans to act out their primal urges, by suppressing emotional control in their amygdala (the "lizard brain").

Based on various physiological and environmental factors, the Lizard's intelligence can range from bestial and animalistic to normal human intelligence. The Lizard personality has most often manifested with human intelligence, capable of speech and higher reasoning, although some versions have been more feral than others. During the "Secret Wars" in particular, he appeared less ruthless than his normal portrayal, showing concern for Volcana and the Wasp after they showed him kindness despite his usual disdain for humans. However, even when operating at the level of a human, the Lizard is rarely as intelligent as Dr. Connors, showing on many occasions an inability to understand his human self's work and use it to further his own ends despite his best efforts.

The Lizard has apparently "destroyed" the Curt Connors persona, but has subsequently begun to display some of Connors's human emotions. In contrast to his previously feral nature, he has also shown sufficient intellectual capabilities to replicate Connors' work for himself, although he is still hampered by his inability to fully comprehend human emotions.

== Continuity ==
In a 2004 story arc entitled Lizard's Tale, written by Paul Jenkins in the Spectacular Spider-Man comic book, it was revealed that the Lizard persona was not a separate personality from Dr. Connors after all—Curt had been consciously controlling his reptilian alter ego all along. Furthermore, Connors was shown to know that Peter Parker was Spider-Man, despite the discovery of the secret identity never being explained or depicted. The story ended with Dr. Connors deliberately getting himself sent to prison and hoping the Lizard would not be unleashed again. The Lizard's next appearance after this was as a member of the Sinister Twelve, where he showed no indication of being controlled by the mind of Dr. Connors. Although the idea of Connors controlling the Lizard was subsequently ignored, when the Lizard's mind was briefly trapped in Connors' human form, he attempted to mutate the staff of Horizon Labs into lizard people like himself, with none of the other lizards demonstrating the same hostility to humans as the Lizard, prompting Spider-Man to speculate that the Lizard's anti-human traits came from Connors' anger at the world for his lost arm and family rather than the Lizard being completely separate from Connors.

Another continuity-related issue involves Connors' son Billy. Unlike many other Marvel Comics children, he has not appreciably grown up since the comics' stories of the 1960s. Billy's visible age also seems to waver back and forth between approximately eight and 13 years old, depending on the particular comic artist drawing the character.

== Other versions ==
Many alternate versions of Lizard have appeared throughout the character's publication history.

=== Earth-66 ===
On Earth-66, Lizard is an ordinary lizard who sought revenge on Spider-Rex after he accidentally ripped off his tail. Despite opposition from his wife Lizzy and Spider-Rex, who both insist that his tail would have eventually grown back, the Lizard uses a meteorite fragment to transform into a Chimera and eventually obtain a human form.

=== Marvel 1602 ===
In Marvel 1602, Connors is a philosopher whose transformed state resembles a Velociraptor and retains his human mind.

=== Spider-Gwen ===
On Earth-65, Peter Parker was the first Lizard, with Harry Osborn and Curt Connors later succeeding him.

=== Ultimate Marvel ===
In the Ultimate Marvel universe, Curt Connors is a friend of Reed Richards who created the Carnage symbiote and goes on to join S.H.I.E.L.D.

== In other media ==
=== Television ===
- A character based on the Lizard named Curt Conner/The Lizard Man appears in Spider-Man (1967), voiced by Gillie Fenwick. He has both of his arms. In the episode "Where Crawls the Lizard", he works on a serum intended to cure "swamp fever", only for it to transform him. He plots to create an army of lizard people like himself and take over the world until Spider-Man foils his plans and restores him to his human form. In "Conner's Reptiles", Conner experiments with increasing reptiles' intelligence, but inadvertently turns a regular alligator into another humanoid lizard called Reptilla (voiced by Paul Soles). It kidnaps Conner, but Spider-Man rescues the latter and restores Reptilla.
- The Lizard appears in the Spider-Man (1981) episode "Lizards, Lizards, Everywhere", voiced by Corey Burton.
- Dr. Curt Connors / Lizard appears in Spider-Man: The Animated Series, voiced by Joseph Campanella. This version maintains his genius-level intellect as the Lizard coupled with his alter ego's savage mindset from the comics. In the pilot episode "Night of the Lizard", Connors transforms into the eponymous character after using himself as a test subject for his experiments with lizard DNA in the hopes of regenerating his right arm. While transformed, the Lizard abducts his wife Margaret and attempts to transform New York's population into lizards like himself, only to be defeated by Spider-Man and restored to his human form. In "The Lizard King", a number of sewer lizards become mutated by Connors's chemicals and abduct him, who transforms into the Lizard to become their king. With Debra Whitman's help, Margaret and Mary Jane Watson create a cure, which Spider-Man administers, restoring the mutated lizards to normal. In the three-part episode "Secret Wars", the Lizard is among several supervillains that the Beyonder transports to an alien planet to engage in a war against a team of heroes led by Spider-Man, though the Lizard defects to the heroes' side after Iron Man and Mister Fantastic use a machine to allow Connors's mind to take control of the Lizard's body. After the war ends, Connors is returned to Earth with no memory of what happened.
- Dr. Curt Connors / Lizard appears in the Spider-Man: The New Animated Series episode "Law of the Jungle", voiced by Rob Zombie. This version is Peter Parker's science teacher at Empire State University who lost his right arm as a result of an accident while testing Oscorp Industries' Wide Area Fragmentation Explosive Round (WAFER). Connors intentionally transforms into the Lizard to exact revenge, maintaining his intelligence and ability to speak. Following a battle with Spider-Man, the Lizard is left hanging by webbing from a helicopter. Spider-Man tries to reason with him, but the Lizard lunges at him, accidentally cutting the webbing and falling to his death.
- Dr. Curt Connors / Lizard appears in The Spectacular Spider-Man, voiced by Dee Bradley Baker. He and his wife Martha Connors play a supporting role in the first season, working at Empire State University and employing Eddie Brock as a lab assistant and Peter Parker and Gwen Stacy as interns. In the episode "Natural Selection", Curt transforms into the Lizard using an experimental serum, but is defeated and cured by Spider-Man. In the second season, Miles Warren takes control of the Connorses' lab after threatening to expose Curt's role in creating the Lizard, leading to the family moving away.
- Dr. Curt Connors / Lizard appears in Ultimate Spider-Man, voiced by Tom Kenny in the first season and subsequently by Dee Bradley Baker. This version is a S.H.I.E.L.D. scientist. After being forced to amputate his right arm following the Green Goblin's attack on the Helicarrier during the first season finale, the second season sees Connors and Spider-Man retrieve several of Doctor Octopus's animal DNA formulas to study for potential medicinal use. He injects himself with the lizard formula, which restores his right arm, but mutates him into the Lizard until Spider-Man helps restore his human form. In subsequent appearances, the Lizard joins the Sinister Six and gains the ability to mutate others via his bite.
  - A vampiric alternate universe version of the Lizard called the Lizard King appears in the episode "Return to the Spider-Verse", also voiced by Dee Bradley Baker.
  - In the two-part series finale "Graduation Day", Doctor Octopus transforms Crossbones into a new incarnation of the Lizard and brainwashes him into joining the Sinister Six before Spider-Man cures and frees him.
- The Lizard appears in the Marvel Disk Wars: The Avengers episode "Re-enforcement Hawkeye".
- Dr. Curt Connors / Lizard appears in Spider-Man (2017), voiced by Yuri Lowenthal. This version is an Oscorp scientist and a teacher at Horizon High who secretly works with Norman Osborn in exchange for a cure for his Lizard form. After framing Max Modell for crimes involving the Venom symbiote, Connors becomes the interim headmaster of Horizon High before being exposed.
- The Lizard appears in Spidey and His Amazing Friends, voiced by Bumper Robinson.
- A female version of the character named Carla Connors appears in Your Friendly Neighborhood Spider-Man, voiced by Zehra Fazal. She is an Oscorp scientist who mentors Peter during his internship. The Lizard will appear in the show's second season.

=== Film ===
- Dr. Curt Connors appears in Sam Raimi's Spider-Man trilogy, portrayed by Dylan Baker. This version is a former college classmate and friend of Otto Octavius and a Columbia University physics professor who is concerned for Peter Parker's well-being and academic performance in his quantum mechanics course. While Connors did not become the Lizard in the films, Raimi, Baker and producer Grant Curtis expressed interest in exploring the concept in sequels.
- Rhys Ifans portrays Dr. Curt Connors / Lizard in two Marvel films. This version is an Oscorp biologist and former partner of Richard Parker whose research focused on genetically combining animal traits with humans to improve health. Additionally, Connors is a sympathetic yet misguided individual driven by the loss of his right arm and a desire to do genuine good while his Lizard alter-ego is more feral than most incarnations despite retaining Connors' intelligence. Additionally, he does not wear clothes and has a less pronounced snout, giving him a more humanoid appearance.
  - Connors first appears in the Sony film The Amazing Spider-Man (2012). Peter Parker finds Richard's notes and visits Connors to continue what he and Richard started. The two successfully formulate a serum together, which Connors injects himself with after being fired from Oscorp for refusing to rush into human trials. The serum regenerates Connors' lost arm, but eventually mutates him into the Lizard, who goes on a rampage until Spider-Man intervenes. Escaping into the sewer, he reverts to his human self, but the effects of the serum makes him obsessed with his abilities. He builds a makeshift off-site lab while the Lizard persona further corrupts his mind by manipulating him to experiment on himself further. The Lizard discovers Spider-Man's secret identity, develops a mind of his own, and asserts himself as the dominant personality while seeking to mutate all of New York into lizards like himself. However, Spider-Man foils his plan with Captain George Stacy's help and cures him. With the Lizard's personality gone and his sanity restored, Connors surrenders to the authorities. In the film's mid-credits scene, Connors is remanded to Beloit Psychiatric Hospital, where he speaks with the Gentleman regarding the Parkers' knowledge of him.
  - Ifans reprised his role in the Marvel Cinematic Universe (MCU) film Spider-Man: No Way Home (2021). (Note: Archive footage from The Amazing Spider-Man was used to portray Connors in his human form while Ifans voiced the Lizard throughout the film.) Sometime after learning Peter's secret identity, Connors is transported to an alternate universe (MCU), where he is found and imprisoned by Doctor Strange alongside other alternate universe-displaced supervillains. He encounters the MCU's version of Peter Parker, who offers to cure them and avert their original fates upon returning to their respective universes. Skeptical of this for fear of unforeseen consequences, Connors joins Green Goblin in fighting back. The former later joins Sandman and Electro in fighting three Spider-Men before he is eventually defeated and cured by the second Parker. After reverting to his human form, Strange returns Connors and the other displaced individuals to their respective home universes.
- The Spider-Gwen incarnation of Peter Parker / Lizard makes minor appearances in Spider-Man: Into the Spider-Verse (2018) and its sequel Spider-Man: Across the Spider-Verse (2023), voiced by Jack Quaid in the latter film.

=== Video games ===
- The Lizard appears in Questprobe featuring Spider-Man.
- The Lizard appears in Spider-Man: The Video Game.
- The Lizard appears as a boss in The Amazing Spider-Man (1990).
- The Lizard appears as a boss in Spider-Man vs. The Kingpin.
- The Lizard appears as a boss in The Amazing Spider-Man (1992).
- The Lizard appears as an optional boss in Spider-Man (1995).
- The Lizard appears as a boss in Spider-Man: Lethal Foes.
- The Lizard appears in Spider-Man (2000), voiced by Dee Bradley Baker.
- The Lizard appears as a boss in Spider-Man 2: Enter: Electro, voiced again by Dee Bradley Baker.
- Curt Connors, based on the Sam Raimi film incarnation, appears in Spider-Man 2 (2004), voiced by Joe Alaskey. The Lizard appears as a boss exclusively in the Game Boy Advance version of the game although he was planned to appear in the main console release but was scrapped due to time restraints, however Lizard-like enemies still appear in the game's arena mode as remnants from the development.
- The Lizard appears as a mini-boss in Marvel: Ultimate Alliance, voiced by James Arnold Taylor. This version is a member of Doctor Doom's Masters of Evil.
- Curt Connors / Lizard, based on the Sam Raimi film incarnation, appears in Spider-Man 3, voiced by Nathan Carlson. After transforming into the Lizard, he kidnaps and converts numerous people into lizards as part of a plot to replace New York's population with reptiles. While he is thwarted by Spider-Man, the Lizard escapes. He is later hunted by Kraven the Hunter and Calypso before the latter uses a magic potion to transform him into the Mega Lizard. After Spider-Man defeats Mega Lizard, he reverts to Connors and is taken to the hospital. Connors also helps Spider-Man analyze a piece of his symbiote suit and treat Dr. Michael Morbius' vampirism.
- The Lizard appears as a playable character in Spider-Man: Friend or Foe, voiced by Roger L. Jackson. This version is an anti-hero who searches the Earth for a cure for his condition. After encountering Spider-Man in Egypt, the Lizard works with him to stop an invasion of P.H.A.N.T.O.M.s created by Mysterio.
- The Lizard appears as a boss in Marvel: Ultimate Alliance 2, voiced by Marc Samuel.
- Curt Connors / Lizard, based on Rhys Ifans' portrayal, appears as the final boss of The Amazing Spider-Man film tie-in game, voiced by Steve Blum. The game continues from the film's events and sees several cross-species experiments Oscorp created using Connors' research escaping into Manhattan and infecting its population with a deadly virus. Spider-Man reluctantly releases Connors from prison to develop a cure, which they eventually succeed in. When Alistair Smythe begins destroying the city in his attempt to save it and strips Spider-Man of his powers, Connors reluctantly transforms into the Lizard to face him. After recovering his powers, Spider-Man helps the Lizard defeat Smythe, but Connors succumbs to the Lizard's consciousness and flees. After defeating and curing the Lizard once more, Connors willingly returns to prison. Additionally, the Lizard appears a playable character in the Lizard Rampage DLC.
- The Lizard appears in Marvel Super Hero Squad Online.
- Curt Connors / Lizard appears as a playable character in Lego Marvel Super Heroes, voiced again by Steve Blum. This version is capable of switching between his human and reptilian forms at will.
- The Lizard appears in Marvel Heroes. He breaks out of prison alongside Calvin Zabo, after which the two make their way to the former's lab at the Bronx Zoo. After Zabo becomes Mister Hyde, he injects the Lizard with his Hyde serum to strengthen him before combining their serums to infect the Bronx Zoo's water supply, creating hybrids of lizards and other animals.
- The Lizard appears as a boss in Marvel: Avengers Alliance.
- The Lizard appears as a boss in Marvel Avengers Alliance 2.
- The Lizard appears as a playable character in Marvel: Future Fight.
- Curt Connors / Lizard appears as a playable character in Lego Marvel Super Heroes 2.
- Curt Connors appears in Insomniac Games' Spider-Man series. This version is an Oscorp scientist working for Norman Osborn and personal physician to his terminally-ill son Harry Osborn who previously fought Spider-Man as the Lizard until the web-slinger cured him years prior.
  - Connors first appears in the mid-credits scene of Spider-Man: Miles Morales, voiced by an uncredited actor. Connors monitors Harry until Norman orders him to release the latter despite the potential danger, which Connors reluctantly complies with.
  - Connors / Lizard appears as a boss in Spider-Man 2 (2023), voiced by Mark Whitten. In a flashback, Connors lost his arm while accompanying Oscorp in procuring a meteorite containing the Venom symbiote years prior, which Norman would later use on Harry. In the present, Connors continues to monitor Harry for adverse side effects until Kraven the Hunter kidnaps and forces Connors to turn back into the Lizard so he can hunt him. After bonding with the symbiote, Spider-Man works to find and cure Connors to save Harry. Upon being cured, Connors attempts to convince Spider-Man to remove and destroy the symbiote due to its negative influence before working with him to thwart a symbiote invasion.

=== Merchandise ===
- The Lizard received a figure in Mego's "World's Greatest Super-Heroes" line.
- The Lizard received several figures from Toy Biz as part of the Spider-Man: The Animated Series tie-in line, Spider-Man Classics, and the Marvel Legends series.
- The Lizard received a figure in Hasbro's 2007 Spider-Man 3 film tie-in toyline based on his appearance in the video game of the same name.
- The Lizard received several mini-busts from Art Asylum and Bowen Designs, with the latter also producing a statue of the character.
- The Spectacular Spider-Man incarnation of the Lizard received a figure from Hasbro.
- The Amazing Spider-Man (2012) incarnation of the Lizard received several figures and toys in Hasbro's tie-in toy line.

=== Miscellaneous ===
- The Lizard appears in Spider-Man: Turn Off the Dark, portrayed by Brandon Rubendall. This version was originally an Oscorp Industries scientist before the Green Goblin turns him into a member of his Sinister Six.
- The Lizard appears in Marvel Universe Live!. This version is a member of the Sinister Six.

== Reception ==
The Lizard was ranked No. 9 on a listing of Marvel Comics' monster characters in 2015.

In 2022, CBR.com ranked Lizard 5th in their "10 Most Violent Spider-Man Villains" list.
