= Torment (comics) =

Comic book story arc in Spider-Man

- Publisher: Marvel Comics
- Publication date: August – December 1990
- Genre: Superhero
- Title(s): Spider-Man #1-5
- Main character(s): Spider-Man; Mary Jane Watson; Lizard; Calypso

Creative team
- Writer: Todd McFarlane
- Artist: Todd McFarlane
- Letterer: Rick Parker
- Colorist(s): Bob Sharen (#1-3); Todd McFarlane (#4); Gregory Wright (#5)
- Editor: Jim Salicrup
- Hardcover: ISBN 0-7851-3791-2

"Torment" is a comic-book story arc written and illustrated by Todd McFarlane that encompasses the first five issues of an ongoing Spider-Man series. It was published in 1990 by Marvel Comics. The comic was a record-breaking sales success and helped start the next stage of development in the Modern Age of Comic Books, which would lead to the formation of Image Comics and the rise of the speculator market.

== Plot summary ==
The Lizard is going on a murdering spree before Spider-Man tries to stop him. The Lizard poisons Spider-Man and throws him off of a building. It is later revealed that Calypso is hypnotizing the Lizard to do her bidding, and also manipulates Spider-Man's mind, making him think that Kraven the Hunter is alive again after committing suicide. After an extreme ordeal, Spider-Man defeats both Calypso and the Lizard and barely survives a building explosion that seemingly kills the villains. Spider-Man believes the Lizard has died either from the explosion or Calypso's effect on his brain, but the creature has actually survived both.

== Publication history ==
McFarlane had been the artist for The Amazing Spider-Man for a long time, and it was for Spider-Man #1 that McFarlane moved to be the artist and the writer, even though "the itch, the creative itch, of writing at the point wasn't so much that I wanted to be a writer. Because to me, I just wanted to draw. It was being in control of what I was drawing. The only way I was going to get there was to go, 'Well, I have to make up the story.'"

Editor Jim Salicrup has said it came about organically. He explained, "I encouraged Todd to get more involved and start inking his own work. ... he was such a naturally good storyteller, and thinking about everything he was doing. Todd was willing to go off and write backups or do whatever he could just to starting writing and learn the whole writing thing. I felt he was so vital to what we were doing with Spider-Man at the time that I found myself doing something I never thought I'd want to do, which was to add yet another Spider-Man book".

Part of the thinking was to make more trade paperback-friendly stories: "The ongoing Spider-Man books were like never-ending soap operas. When they tried to collect stories, they had a problem. So the idea was to create a new series where we would do six-part self-contained stories that could then easily be collected as trade paperbacks" They were also inspired by Epic to try better paper quality. Marvel would not introduce it into a current series because of the increase in price, but if they started a new title they could go ahead with their plans.

== Reception ==
The first issue sold 2.65 million copies, setting a record at the time. The following year, Rob Liefeld's X-Force #1 (August 1991) went on to sell 3.9 million, then a couple of months later Jim Lee's X-Men #1 (October 1991) sold 7.5 million copies, these sales being driven by heavy use of collector cards and variant covers. Within a year these superstar artists left Marvel to form Image Comics off the back of the success on these titles, and developments started in these comics led to the speculator boom of the mid-1990s.

However, according to Dave Wallace at Comics Bulletin, "commercial success didn't equate to critical acclaim for McFarlane's new venture, and many found the artist's attempts at writing to be clumsy, unsophisticated and pretentious" and that "[t]here was a frequent sense - as with many writer-artists - that McFarlane's scripts were being written in such a way as to give himself something 'cool' to draw, rather than to provide a particularly compelling or satisfying story." The writing was also picked up by Alex Rodrik at Comics Bulletin, who highlighted the lack of consistency in the narration (switching from first person to third-person), concluding that "Torment is nothing more than a showcase of Spider-Man's fluid movement, and while the art is wonderful, pages (at times) are congested and indulgent." Even for fans of the series at the time the series has not stood the test of time. Augie De Blieck Jr. confessed that "[w]hen they first came out, I was a mind-numbed McFarlane fan" but reading the trade paperback he found that "the money shots of Spidey over the city and fighting for his life still look as energetic and lively as ever, the rest of the pages feel claustrophobic" and that Parker's lettering was "awful."

McFarlane admitted his first run at writing a series had problems:

by the time Spider-Man #1 came out, I'd been in the business, five years, six years, I'd done hundreds if not thousands of pages of art at that point. I've been able to get the kinks out of my drawing. While Spider-Man #1 is the beginning of me starting to put kinks on the page writing, which you have to then eventually, like all writers do, get through. I was in that weird situation on that first issue where, arguably, the worst story I ever write is going to be the one that most people bought. But I never said I was going to come wholly formed here. But I believe that, as time went by, two, three, four years later, that the writing became adequate at that point, and was better than the writing in Spider-Man #1.

== Collected editions ==
The series was first collected as a trade paperback in 1992 and has been reprinted a number of times since:

- Spider-Man: Torment (128 pages, softcover, Marvel Comics, June 1997, ISBN 0-87135-805-0, Boxtree, 96 pages, December 1997, ISBN 0-7522-0385-1, hardcover, Marvel Premiere Classic #27, 144 pages, July 2009, ISBN 0-7851-3791-2)
