= The Gathering of Five and The Final Chapter =

Marvel Comics storylines

"The Gathering of Five"
- Cover to The Amazing Spider-Man #441, cover to the first issue of "The Final Chapter" and showing the Gathering of Five. Art by Rafael Kayanan.
- Publisher: Marvel Comics
- Genre: Superhero
- Main character: Spider-Man

Creative team
- Writer(s): The Sensational Spider-Man; Todd DeZago; The Amazing Spider-Man; The Spectacular Spider-Man; John Byrne #262; Howard Mackie #263; Peter Parker: Spider-Man; Howard Mackie
- Penciller(s): The Sensational Spider-Man; Joe Bennett; The Amazing Spider-Man; Rafael Kayanan; Peter Parker: Spider-Man; Norman Felchle #96; John Romita, Jr. #97; The Spectacular Spider-Man; Luke Ross
- Editor: Ralph Macchio
- The Gathering of Five: ISBN 0-7851-8529-1

"The Gathering of Five" and "The Final Chapter" are interconnected 1998 story lines published by Marvel Comics. Both story lines are crossovers between the various Spider-Man titles published at the time (The Amazing Spider-Man, Spider-Man, The Spectacular Spider-Man, and The Sensational Spider-Man). It marked the cancellation of both The Spectacular Spider-Man and The Sensational Spider-Man, while also "re-branding" The Amazing Spider-Man and Peter Parker: Spider-Man by renumbering the issues to start again with a new "Issue One" (as mandated by Editor-in-Chief Bob Harras).

The story line proved controversial with fans, as it resurrected Peter Parker's Aunt May, who had been killed off at the height of the "Clone Saga" three years earlier in The Amazing Spider-Man #400. Tom DeFalco, who had left months earlier with his Spider-Man: Identity Crisis story line, originally had intended for Peter and Mary Jane's daughter, May Parker, to be returned to them by Kaine. (This story thread was used later as the branching point for the MC2) Mackie and Byrne insisted they have the older May revived, so she could fit into the new relaunch.

== Plot summary ==
=== The Gathering of Five ===
After surviving an attempt on his life by Nitro, Norman Osborn makes a phone call to someone, telling them it was time for "the gathering of five".

==== Acquisitions ====
Norman Osborn and Gregory Herd have a meeting with Hamilton Cromwell, a Neomancer of the Technomancers, to try to persuade him to join The Gathering of Five and bring his piece to the ceremony. Cromwell wants no part of the ceremony and warns Osborn and Herd they should not perform the ceremony either. Herd returns later in his Override costume to steal Cromwell's piece. Spider-Man sees him entering the building and tries to prevent him from stealing the piece, but he escapes with the piece. Herd convinces Osborn to allow him to take Cromwell's place in the ceremony, instead of paying, for stealing the piece so he may try to heal his wife.

The Scriers mention a fight with Kaine but are still able to deliver a "package" to Osborn. Alison Mongrain is found by Joe Robertson in Paris.

==== A Hot Time in the Old Town ====
Spider-Man fights the Molten Man as he walks a straight line of destruction through the city in a trance-like state to try to kill Alison Mongrain, who has returned to New York City with Joe Robertson. Osborn convinces Morris Maxwell to bring his piece and join The Gathering of Five. Maxwell reveals that all participants in the ceremony must come willingly, to receive one of the possible five gifts and curses: power, knowledge, immortality, madness, and death.

==== Web of Despair ====
Madame Web asks Spider-Man to retrieve an artifact for her, and he does it without knowing what it is. She then takes it to Osborn as she volunteers to participate in The Gathering of Five because she will die soon if she does not gain immortality from the ceremony. Norman Osborn's monologues about his time with the Cult of the Scriers allowed him to gather information on the ritual and the main artifact.

==== A Day in the Life ====
Spider-Man stops minor crimes, and an unknown person brings the last piece for The Gathering of Five to Osborn.

==== Gifts ====
Spider-Man stops Override after he robs an armored car. While in police custody, he escapes and reclaims the money he stole, so his wife Annie would be fine if anything went wrong during The Gathering of Five.

=== The Final Chapter ===
==== And Who Shall Claim a Kingly Crown? ====
Mattie Franklin is revealed to be the mystery person who brought the final piece necessary for the ceremony. The Gathering of Five is performed, and each participant appears to receive one of the gifts or curses. When the Molten Man attacked Alison Mongrain and Joe Robertson in front of the Parker house, it is revealed that Osborn implanted something in his brain so that he would ceaselessly go after the tracking device he had given Mongrain as a necklace. Mongrain gives the Molten Man the necklace for him to destroy, but after his attack had already fatally wounded her. Before she dies she can tell Mary Jane that May is alive.

==== Let the Heavens Tremble at the Power of the Goblin ====
Spider-Man fights the Green Goblin as he tries to get to the Osborn hunting lodge in upstate New York. Spider-Man believes the Green Goblin is holding his daughter alive there and that she did not die at the end of the Clone Saga because of what Mongrain told MJ. At the end of the issue, it is revealed that Aunt May is alive and the one the Green Goblin was holding prisoner.

==== The Triumph of the Goblin! ====
The Green Goblin allows Spider-Man to take Aunt May without a fight. Spider-Man brings her to Reed Richards to test what she is, believing her to be an imposter or clone. Using a blood sample from one of Peter's science experiments as a child, Richards can confirm her identity, but there is a mysterious device implanted in her brain that will eventually kill her if not removed soon. Spider-Man then fights the Green Goblin until the Green Goblin declares that he has finally killed Spider-Man.

==== The Final Chapter ====
At the very beginning of the issue, it is revealed that the Green Goblin received the curse of insanity rather than the gift of power from The Gathering of Five, and he only believes that he has killed Spider-Man. In reality, Spider-Man had defeated the Green Goblin (Note: An on-panel version of this confrontation is shown in Revenge of the Green Goblin #1 (mini-series from 2000).) and during the fight, the Green Goblin revealed that it was the real Aunt May currently under the care of Reed Richards, and it was a paid actress infused with May's DNA who Spider-Man had believed to die before (in The Amazing Spider-Man #400). He also revealed that if the device in May's brain is removed, it will trigger bombs all over the world. One final pumpkin bomb makes the Daily Bugle building nearly collapse until Spider-Man can save the building. He then is barely able to get to the hospital in time to tell Reed Richards about the device. Richards and the other surgeons can fix it, so the device stays in May, thereby not triggering the bombs, while not killing her as it stays. Peter also tells Mary Jane that he is quitting his career as Spider-Man and burns his costume.

== Reading order ==
The Gathering of Five

1. The Sensational Spider-Man #32
2. The Amazing Spider-Man #440
3. Spider-Man #96
4. The Spectacular Spider-Man #262
5. The Sensational Spider-Man #33

The Final Chapter

1. The Amazing Spider-Man #441
2. Spider-Man #97
3. The Spectacular Spider-Man #263
4. Spider-Man #98
