= Peter Parker: Spider-Man =

Multiple comic book series

- Cover of Spider-Man #1 (August 1990); Art by Todd McFarlane

Publication information
- Publisher: Marvel Comics
- Genre: Superhero
- Publication date: List: vol. 1: August 1990 – November 1998 vol. 2: January 1999 – August 2003 vol. 3: September 2019 – December 2020 vol. 4: October 2022 – August 2023
- No. of issues: List: vol. 1: 99 (#1–98 and #−1) vol. 2: 57 (#1–57) vol. 3: 5 (#1–5) vol. 4: 7 (#1–11)
- Main character: Spider-Man

Creative team
- Written by: List: Todd McFarlane Erik Larsen Howard Mackie Paul Jenkins Zeb Wells Dan Slott Chip Zdarsky
- Penciller: List: Todd McFarlane Erik Larsen Tom Lyle John Romita Jr. Mark Bagley Adam Kubert Pasqual Ferry Joe Quinones Michael Allred Juan Frigeri Michael Walsh Paulo Siqueira Chris Bachalo

Peter Parker: Spider-Man (alternatively known as Peter Parker: The Spectacular Spider-Man or simply Spider-Man) is the name of four comic book series published by Marvel Comics, all of which feature the superhero Spider-Man.

== Volume 1 (1990–1998) ==
Peter Parker: Spider-Man (originally titled simply Spider-Man), was a monthly comic book series published by Marvel Comics that ran for 98 issues from 1990 to 1998. The series was retitled from Spider-Man with issue #75, but only on the covers; the series was still under its original Spider-Man title in the comic's legal indicia, printed on the title page, from #75–98; the comic book would not officially be titled Peter Parker: Spider-Man until the (vol. 2) series relaunch.

The series originally was conceived as a showcase for Todd McFarlane. McFarlane, who until then had only been known as an artist, was hugely popular at the time and the series was created by editor Jim Salicrup so that McFarlane could pencil, ink, and write a Spider-Man title of his own, starting with the "Torment" storyline.

The series was a massive sales success, with over 2.5 million copies printed. McFarlane stayed on the title until issue #16 (November 1991) in which the story was printed in a landscape format. He created the character Spawn and help found Image Comics in 1992. He was succeeded on the title by Erik Larsen, who had succeeded McFarlane on The Amazing Spider-Man two years earlier, and would later join him in the founding of Image. Larsen wrote and drew the six-issue story arc "Revenge of the Sinister Six" (#18–23). Writer Don McGregor and artist Marshall Rogers crafted a two-part story in issues #27–28 dealing with gun violence.

After that came a quick procession of different contributors, including writers Tom DeFalco, Ann Nocenti, David Michelinie, J. M. DeMatteis, and Terry Kavanagh, and pencillers Ron Frenz, Klaus Janson, and Jae Lee. The rotating creative team was solidified with Spider-Man #44 (March 1994) when writer Howard Mackie and penciller Tom Lyle took over the title; Lyle lasted until issue #61, and Mackie for over six years.

The series played a key role throughout the "Clone Saga", becoming one of two Spider-Man titles that shifted focus to the new Ben Reilly Scarlet Spider character (the other being Web of Spider-Man) with issue #51 (November 1994). The series' run was interrupted by that saga in issues #63 and 64 (Nov.–Dec. 1995), when the title was renumbered to #1 and renamed Scarlet Spider. Spider-Man resumed with #65 (Jan. 1996), with Ben Reily replacing Peter Parker as Spider-Man.

Intended as a permanent change, Reilly's status as the new Spider-Man was cut short when Bob Harras was named new Editor-in-chief of Marvel Comics in February 1996, and ordered the reinstatement of the character's Peter Parker identity. Spider-Man was the title which depicted this and in #75 (December 1996), by Mackie and John Romita Jr., Ben Reilly was killed by the resurrected original Green Goblin – who had seemingly died in The Amazing Spider-Man #122 (July 1973) – and Peter Parker returned to the role of Spider-Man. That same issue, the title of the series was changed to Peter Parker: Spider-Man to concretely establish that the original Spider-Man was being depicted.

The series had a brief interlude in July 1997 with Marvel's one-month "Flashback" event, when all Marvel titles were numbered −1 and each was set before the events of Fantastic Four #1. This #−1 was published between issues #81 and 82. The series then continued uninterrupted until the arrival of John Byrne to the Spider-Man titles heralded a relaunch of the entire line. The series was cancelled with #98 (Nov. 1998) featuring part of "The Gathering of Five and The Final Chapter" storyline and relaunched as (vol. 2) almost immediately afterward.

== Volume 2 (1999–2003) ==
Peter Parker: Spider-Man (vol. 2) was a monthly comic book series published by Marvel Comics that ran for 57 issues between 1999 and 2003.

This series was a continuation of (vol. 1), with the creative team of Howard Mackie and John Romita Jr. having migrated to the new series. In June 2001, Marvel began a dual numbering system on all its titles that had been relaunched and renumbered. The first issue of Peter Parker: Spider-Man to be dual-numbered was listed as both #30 and #128 on the cover – the second figure achieved by adding the total of issues of the new volume (30) to the first volume's 98. The comic's legal indicia, printed on the title page, still listed the series as (vol. 2) #30.

Mackie and Romita Jr. remained through issue #20 (August 2000) when writer Paul Jenkins and artist Mark Buckingham became the new creative team. Jenkins would write the character over different titles for the next five years. Buckingham and Jenkins left Peter Parker: Spider-Man after issue #50 (Jan. 2003) and were briefly succeeded by writer Zeb Wells and an assortment of artists on what was meant to be a two-issue story before cancellation, but due to delays on the replacement book, became seven issues before the title was finally retired with issue #57 (Aug. 2003). This series was replaced with a new Spider-Man title, Spectacular Spider-Man (vol. 2), which debuted with the team of Jenkins and penciller Humberto Ramos, running for 27 issues until 2005.

== Volume 3 (2019–2020) ==
In September 2018, J. J. Abrams, his son Henry Abrams, and artist Sara Pichelli teamed up for volume 3, simply called Spider-Man, a limited series, later collected as Spider-Man: Bloodlines.

== Volume 4 (2022–2023) ==
In July 2022, it was announced that Dan Slott would return to the Spider-Man franchise in October of that year, teaming with veteran Spider-Man artist Mark Bagley for the first time. Their title, simply called Spider-Man, is a monthly ongoing which connects to the status quo of the Amazing Spider-Man run from Zeb Wells and John Romita Jr. The first storyline for the issue is "End of the Spider-Verse", the climactic chapter of the Spider-Verse trilogy begun in 2014 and furthered with Spider-Geddon in 2018.

== Collected editions ==
=== Volume 1 ===
- Spider-Man: Torment (paperback) collects Spider-Man #1–5 and an excerpt from Spectacular Spider-Man Annual #10; 144 pages, 1992, (0-87135-805-0)
- Spider-Man: Masques (hardcover) collects Spider-Man #6–7, 13–14, 16, 144 pages, January 2012, 978-0785159438
- Spider-Man: Perceptions (hardcover) collects Spider-Man #8–12, 128 pages, June 2012, 978-0785160526
- Spider-Man by Todd McFarlane Omnibus collects Spider-Man #1-14, 16, X-Force #4, 440 pages, 2016, (978-1-302-90073-1)
- Spider-Man by Todd McFarlane: The Complete Collection collects Spider-Man #1-14, 16, X-Force #4, 440 pages, March 2021, (1-30292-373-0)
- X-Force: A Force to be Reckoned With includes Spider-Man #16, 248 pages, March 2011, 0785149848
- Infinity Gauntlet Omnibus (hardcover) collects Spider-Man #17
- Spider-Man: Revenge of the Sinister Six (paperback) collects Spider-Man #18–23, 176 pages, December 1994, 978-0785100478
- Spider-Man: Revenge of the Sinister Six (hardcover) collects Spider-Man #15, 18–23, 176 pages, September 2012, 978-0785160564
- Infinity War Omnibus (hardcover) collects Spider-Man #24
- Avengers Academy: Arcade - Death Game (paperback) collects Spider-Man #25, 120 pages, August 2011
- Spider-Man: Maximum Carnage includes Spider-Man #35–37, 336 pages, December 2006, 978-0785109877
- Amazing Spider-Man Epic Collection vol. 26: Lifetheft includes Spider-Man #45, 496 pages, November 2021
- Spider-Man: The Complete Clone Saga Epic
  - Book 1 includes Spider-Man #51–53, 424 pages, April 2010, 978-0785144625
  - Book 2 includes Spider-Man #54–56, 480 pages, June 2010, 978-0785143512
  - Book 3 includes Spider-Man #57–58, Super Special #1, 464 pages, September 2010, 978-0785149545
  - Book 4 includes Spider-Man #59–61, 480 pages, December 2010, 978-0785149552
  - Book 5 includes Spider-Man #62–63, 472 pages, February 2011, 978-0785150091
- Spider-Man: The Complete Ben Reilly Epic
  - Book 2 includes Spider-Man #64–65, 424 pages, November 2011, 978-0785156123
  - Book 3 includes Spider-Man #66–67, 432 pages, January 2012, 978-0785156130
  - Book 4 includes Spider-Man #68–70, 464 pages, April 2012, 978-0785161318
  - Book 5 includes Spider-Man #71–72, 464 pages, July 2012, 978-0785163831
  - Book 6 includes Spider-Man #73–75, 448 pages, November 2012, 978-0785165521
- X-Men: The Complete Onslaught Epic Vol. 2 includes Spider-Man #72, 248 pages, June 2008, 978-0785128243
- Spider-Man: Revelations includes Spider-Man #75, 112 pages, October 1997, 978-0785105602
- Spider-Man: Spider-Hunt includes Spider-Man #88–90, 272 pages, June 2012, 978-0785160519
- Spider-Man: Identity Crisis includes Spider-Man #91–92, 200 pages, May 2012, 978-0785159704
- Spider-Man: The Gathering of Five includes Spider-Man #96–98, 248 pages, January 2014, 0-7851-8529-1

=== Volume 2 ===
- Spider-Man: Next Chapter
  - Volume 1 includes Spider-Man (vol. 2) #1–6, 392 pages, September 2011, 978-0785157595
  - Volume 2 includes Spider-Man (vol. 2) #7–12, Annual '99, 368 pages, February 2012, 978-0785159667
  - Volume 3 includes Spider-Man (vol. 2) #13–19, 400 pages, August 2012, ISBN 978-0785159773
- Peter Parker: Spider-Man
  - Volume 1 - A Day in the Life includes Spider-Man (vol. 2) #20–22, 26, 160 pages, June 2001, 978-0785107774
  - Volume 2 - One Small Break includes Spider-Man (vol. 2) #27–28, 30–34, 160 pages, July 2002, 978-0785108245
  - Volume 3 - Return of the Goblin includes Spider-Man (vol. 2) #44–47, 96 pages, September 2002 978-0785110194
  - Volume 4 - Trials and Tribulations includes Spider-Man (vol. 2) #35, 37, 48–50, 128 pages, May 2003, 978-0785111504
  - Volume 5 - Senseless Violence includes Spider-Man (vol. 2) #51–57, 160 pages, September 2003, 978-0785111719
- Spider-Man: Revenge of the Green Goblin includes Spider-Man (vol. 2) #25, 160 pages, April 2002, 978-0785108733
- Spectacular Spider-Man: The Final Curtain includes Spider-Man (vol. 2) #39–41, 144 pages, October 2005, 978-0785119500
- Spider-Man's Tangled Web Volume 4 includes Spider-Man (vol. 2) #42–43, 176 pages, March 2003, 978-0785110644
- Spider-Man: Light in the Darkness' includes Spider-Man (vol. 2) #20-33, Annual 2000, 432, April 2019 978-1302918637
