= Dead No More: The Clone Conspiracy =

2016–17 Marvel Comics Spider-Man storyline

- Artwork for the cover of The Clone Conspiracy vol. 1, 1 (November 2016); Art by Gabriele Dell'Otto
- Publisher: Marvel Comics
- Publication date: October 2016 – May 2017
- Genre: Superhero
- Main character(s): Spider-Man; Jackal/Ben Reilly; Doctor Octopus; Gwen Stacy; Prowler; Silk

Creative team
- Writer(s): Dan Slott; Christos Gage
- Artist: Jim Cheung
- Penciller(s): Jim Cheung; R. B. Silva; Giuseppe Camuncoli; Jamal Campbell; Irene Strychalski
- Inker(s): John Dell; Cam Smith
- Letterer(s): Joe Caramagna; Cory Petit; Clayton Cowles
- Colorist(s): Justin Ponsor; Jason Keith; Jamal Campbell; Marte Gracia; Ian Herring

"Dead No More: The Clone Conspiracy" is a 2016–17 Marvel Comics storyline starring Spider-Man. The story was notable for resurrecting Spider-Man supporting character Ben Reilly, who was killed in 1996 at the end of the Clone Saga. The storyline led Kaine Parker to reclaim the heroic Scarlet Spider mantle and appear in his own comic book series. The story received generally mixed reviews, with critics praising the art style and action, however criticized the story and the retcons, as well as the treatment of Ben Reilly.

"Clone Conspiracy" was followed by the series Ben Reilly: Scarlet Spider, which has Reilly returning to the identity of Scarlet Spider. In 2025, "Clone Conspiracy" served as the basis for the storyline "All-New, All-Deadly", in which the clone Gwen Stacy is resurrected.

== Premise ==
This storyline details Jackal resurfacing. He manages to get Rhino, Lizard, Doctor Octopus and a female Electro on his side with a chance to reunite with their loved ones.

== Plot ==
=== Prologue ===
Jackal resurfaces in the form of a mysterious man in a red suit with an Anubis mask. Approaching several of Spider-Man's enemies, Jackal offers a deal to them in the form of the chance to revive their lost loved ones if they follow his orders. He starts with Rhino, presenting him with his resurrected wife Oksana. He then meets with Lizard, reuniting him with his deceased wife and son Martha Connors and Billy Connors. Giving Rhino a new black version of his suit, Jackal sends Rhino to break out Lizard and a depowered Electro from prison. Afterwards, he offers Electro help to regain his electrical powers.

Jackal later sends Rhino to convince Kingpin to join up with him while using a revived Vanessa Fisk as persuasion. Kingpin snaps Vanessa's neck, calling her an abomination and not his real wife. Spider-Man appears at Fisk Industries as Kingpin goes after Rhino. Jackal is then seen with a revived Gwen Stacy at his side.

=== Lead-in plot ===
After J. Jonah Jameson Sr. is hospitalized at Mount Sinai Hospital, Peter Parker and Jameson's son J. Jonah Jameson are approached by Rita Clarkson of New U Technologies, who offers to treat Jameson with the company's technology. It is revealed that the individuals the Jackal revived are clones created to do his bidding. Jackal's plans go awry when Francine Frye absorbs Electro's electricity powers, killing him. Prowler infiltrates New U Technologies on Peter's behalf and is accidentally killed by Francine, but Jackal manages to revive him. Jackal has Prowler find out what Parker Industries is up to.

When Peter scans the Living Brain to find out why it is acting unusually, Doctor Octopus' consciousness asks why it was erased. Realizing the truth, Peter shuts down Living Brain only for Doctor Octopus' consciousness to reactivate and escape in the Octobot. Arriving at New U Enterprises, the Doctor Octopus-possessed Octobot plans to get his biological body back.

With Jameson Sr.'s health declining, Peter has to endure Jonah's and May's concerns for his extreme skepticism about New U, with his secret identity preventing him from informing them of the real reason he doubts them. Peter remains adamant with sticking to the conventional procedure and Jameson Sr. has sided with him. Peter's superheroic endeavors prevent him from accompanying May and Jonah as Jameson Sr.'s health reaches critical status and he undergoes conventional surgery. Despite the surgery, Jameson Sr. dies.

=== Main plot ===
J. Jonah Jameson Sr. is revealed to have contracted an illness while in Madagascar with Aunt May, which led to his death. After Jameson Sr.'s funeral, Peter decides to pay Jerry Salteres a visit in order to investigate why his spider-sense went off in his presence. At Salteres' house, his wife Emma reveals that New U had mysteriously taken Jerry away after he forgot to take a daily pill prescribed by New U and his health decayed. As Spider-Man, Peter infiltrates the New U HQ and tries to locate Jerry using a spider-tracer he had placed on him. Spider-Man discovers several stasis tubes, with one of them containing Jerry's still living nervous system. Spider-Man is spotted by one of Miles Warren's clone/assistants, who calls the Rhino and Electro for help. After dispatching the two villains, Spider-Man pursues Miles, only to find Gwen Stacy behind a closed door. The shock of Gwen's presence prevents Spidey from reacting to his spider-sense in time, and he is punched by Doctor Octopus.

In a side-story, Gwen is resurrected by Jackal and his clones. The Jackal claims that she is not a clone, but the real Gwen who was harvested from her remains and remembers her former life, including her death and Peter's secret identity. Jackal offers Gwen the opportunity to be his partner as he tries to change the world with his new technology. Gwen is hesitant at first, but accepts when the Jackal reveals he has reanimated her father George Stacy.

After the Jackal breaks up the fight between Spider-Man and Doctor Octopus, he shows Spider-Man around New U Technologies. George Stacy sees something off about Gwen's face and pulls a gun at her. It is revealed that Gwen is actually the Gwen Stacy of Earth-65 (Spider-Woman) that Spider-Man found. The real Gwen Stacy is kidnapped by Kaine and taken to Parker Industries to be studied. Kaine reveals that he and Spider-Woman came to Earth-616 because they saw on other Earths Spider-Man allying with the Jackal results in a global disaster from the Carrion virus.

The scientists figure they can use Kaine to find a cure for the virus since he is not contagious. They alert the police to a possible possible epidemic. Police Chief Anderson, secretly in league with the Jackal, informs him of Gwen's location. Jackal sends Electro and Rhino to retrieve Gwen and attends a meeting where he reveals his plan to move into Phase 2 of his project, allowing more New U Technologies factories and less government oversights. Doctor Octopus, working on improving the cloning process, is told by Jackal that he is moving to a new location since Spider-Man knows where he is. At Horizon University, Rhino and Electro retrieve Gwen, but she tells them to take Kaine as his condition could help with Jackal's experiments. Anna Maria Marconi volunteers to come since she has studied both Kaine and the drug. Spider-Man and Spider-Woman arrive too late to stop them. Before they rescue Kaine and Anna, Kingpin arrives and reveals he has been following the Jackal's trail since the encounter with his cloned wife. He gives Spider-Man the location of a meeting that Jackal will be at so Spider-Man can take him down for revenge. Spider-Man arrives at the airstrip where Jackal is receiving a large box and attacks him. Jackal displays enhanced strength and speed and overcomes Spider-Man. Jackal takes off his mask and reveals himself to be not Miles Warren, but instead Ben Reilly. He offers Peter the chance to bring back Uncle Ben as his corpse is in the large box.

In the Jackal's laboratory, Doctor Octopus is studying Kaine and Electro to perfect his "proto clone." Anna Maria arrives but becomes uncomfortable when Doctor Octopus alludes to his romantic interest in her. Spider-Woman follows her Earth-616 counterpart into the South New U Technologies facility to find Kaine. After Ben and Peter's confrontation, Ben drives Spider-Man to the New U Technologies facility with Uncle Ben's corpse and explains to Peter that he was able to make his vision come to life by emotionally blackmailing the higher-ups of society. He shows Peter the "Haven," a section of the facility set up like a normal neighborhood where Peter sees all of his resurrected friends and enemies. He apologizes to the Stacys and Marla Jameson tells Spider-Man that she was honored by his vow not to let other people die. After J. Jonah Jameson leaves to promote the New U Technologies on television, Spider-Man confronts Jackal and tells him that the reason he has not brought Uncle Ben back yet is because Peter knows Uncle Ben would tell Jackal that he is wrong and that he is using this power without responsibility. Jackal orders Spider-Man's rogues gallery to kill the hero and plans to replace Peter when he is dead. Prowler assists Spider-Man in battling the villains as Jackal heads back to his laboratory. Anna Maria reveals she knows how to stop the decaying process on the clones and Jackal offers her the "proto clone" body in exchange for the formula. Doctor Octopus takes offense to Jackal's comments on Maria's dwarfism and attacks him. Spider-Woman tries to free Kaine, but is attacked by Electro. Doctor Octopus pulls a switch which activates the Carrion virus in all the clones and causes them to rapidly degenerate.

As New U Technologies' subjects continue to decay, Spider-Man heads to Jackal's laboratory. After George Stacy deteriorates in Gwen Stacy's arms, she helps Peter get to the lab. When they arrive, Gwen locks Spider-Man inside the lab and sacrifices herself to the reanimated Hobgoblin and Green Goblin to give Spider-Man more time. Kaine is knocked out of the facility by Jackal. Spider-Woman and Prowler assist him in containing the infected villains. During the ensuing melee, Lizard and his family escape, with Lizard stating that he can cure both Martha and Billy. In the lab, Anna Maria tells Spider-Man that she has invented an inverse frequency that can fix most of the problem. Doctor Octopus fights Jackal to allow Peter and Anna Maria the time to transmit the frequency. They go to the Fact Channel's filming location to transmit the signal and find Silk there, who tells them that Marla Jameson shut down the signal before deteriorating in her husband's arms. Jameson admits to Spider-Man that Parker was right about the situation. Spider-Man hacks into the Webware Emergency System from Parker Industries, sending a signal that stops some of the victims from decaying, but turns Jackal, Doctor Octopus, and Gwen Stacy to dust. Anna notes that the "proto clone," or "Ultimate Template," appears missing. The Prowler and DeWolff clones die fighting, while Electro and some of the cloned villains survive the frequency and escape. Dr. Clarkson takes Spider-Man and his team downstairs, where some of the New U Technologies patients are still alive. Some of the patients like Prowler are cured of the virus and still have a chance at living.

=== Tie-ins ===
==== The Amazing Spider-Man ====
Trapped in Doctor Octopus' tentacles, Spider-Man expresses his disappointment that New U Technologies is cloning villains. Doctor Octopus claims that he is the real Doctor Octopus and not a clone or a hologram. A flashback is shown that the Doctor Octopus-possessed Octobot went to Potter's Field where his body is buried to obtain some genetic material only to find that it was stolen, along with the corpses of Alistair Smythe and other villains. The Doctor Octopus-possessed Octobot discovers New U Technologies is behind the grave robbing. Upon arriving at New U Technologies, the Doctor Octopus-possessed Octobot allowed his body to be cloned in its original form. After removing Parker's conscious from the clone body, Doctor Octopus transfer his mind into the new body. Now an ally of Jackal, Doctor Octopus receives special pills to prevent his body from suffering clone degeneration.

Prior to Kaine's return to his Earth, it is revealed that Kaine's human body emerged from the Other's corpse similar to Peter's in the "Changes" storyline. After returning to the Great Web thanks to the Master Weaver, Kaine discovers that he is dying from a zombie-like Carrion virus that is a side-effect of Warren's cloning process, and is not allowed to go back to his Earth to avoid anyone catching it. Karn shows Kaine a number of realities with zombie apocalypses caused by this disease. Kaine and the Spider-Woman visit these realities to find a possible way to stop the pandemic. Kaine discovers that the cause of the pandemic in all the realities is caused by Parker Industries teaming up with New U Technologies to spread Warren's technology. In one of the realities, they manage to steal research from Peter and Warren before battling that reality's Kaine who dies from the Carrion virus during their fight. After studying the corpse they determine Kaine is not contagious. Karn reveals the events Kaine encountered in the other realities are about to happen in Kaine's own reality. Since Peter has not yet formed a partnership with Warren, they have a chance to stop the pandemic. They plan to infiltrate New U Technologies and have Spider-Woman replace the Gwen Stacy of Earth-616 to find out more about New U Technologies. While Spider-Woman changes her looks, Kaine reveals to Karn that his research on his deceased counterpart reveal he only has a short time to live. He keeps this from Spider-Woman to make sure saving the Earth-616 reality is their top priority.

After Ben Reilly reveals his identity to Peter, he tells Peter how he was resurrected and was motivated to create New U Technologies. After his death at the hands of the Green Goblin, Ben's dissolved remains were collected by Jackal and he was resurrected thanks to a new cloning process by Jackal. Jackal was still unable to stop the clones from degrading, and subsequently resurrected Ben 26 times. The repeated deaths and resurrections slowly caused his good memories to fade. Ben eventually breaks free and knocks out Jackal. After he improves Warren's formula, he makes clones of Miles and persuades Jackal that he is also a clone, making it nearly impossible to tell who is the real one. Now free with a number of Miles Warren clones as his servants, Ben becomes the new Jackal. He is determined to help the people who have influenced his and Peter's lives with Jackal's technology so no one has to suffer again. Ben tells Peter that bringing back Uncle Ben is his gift to him. After hearing Ben's story proposal, Peter becomes interested in Ben's offer.

At Haven Spider-Man meets Gwen, who tries to convince him to support New U Technologies. Gwen does not understand why Peter is upset about his loved ones returned from the grave. Peter has a hard time believing she is the real Gwen given his experiences with clones. Gwen tries justifying her existence by telling Peter her memories, including how she overheard the Goblin talking to Spider-Man before her death. Peter thinks she died hating him, but Gwen said that she did not hate him, but rather feels betrayed. After she had time to think, she understood that Peter continued to be Spider-Man to prevent more deaths. However, she is upset that Peter cannot let himself be with Mary Jane because he lets his duties as Spider-Man overpower his need for happiness. When Peter still has doubts about Gwen being a clone, she tries kissing him, but he puts on his mask to stop her. Gwen sees Jackal order the villains to kill Spider-Man and wants to help, but the alarm goes off and she and her father catch the Carrion virus.

When Spider-Man activates the Webware to stabilize the human and clone cells all across the world, the various Miles Warren clones deteriorate as Ben Reilly fights Doctor Octopus. The Warren clone that does not melt realizes he is the true Warren and vows to have revenge on Ben as the true Jackal. As Ben and Doctor Octopus start decaying, Ben tries transferring his mind into the finished proto-clone, but Doctor Octopus stops him and succeeds in transferring his mind instead. Ben takes the New U pills and steals a citizen's Webware to stabilize his body and goes to his safehouse (a recreation of Peter's childhood home). He finds Warren in his Jackal outfit waiting in the living room. Jackal proceeds to burn Ben's house down and engages him in one final battle. Ben defeats Jackal and leaves him in the burning house to die and heads off, pondering what he is going to do with his life.

==== Prowler ====
After stopping a bank robbery that a revived Madame Web foresaw, Prowler returns to the New U Technologies to stop a fight between Jack O'Lantern, Kangaroo, Massacre, Mirage, Montana, and Tarantula. Jackal reminds Prowler that he brought him back to keep the reanimated supervillains in line and that he wants Prowler to warn him when he leaves the building so his technology does not go out into the world. Knowing how annoying it is to be stuck in the same location, Jackal assigns Prowler to take care of a potential hacker in San Francisco. When Prowler asks for more information on the hacker from Madame Web, she tells him that she sees buildings filled with agony that cannot escape. After confronting his killer Electro, Prowler figures out Madame Web's prediction and goes to Alcatraz, where he is caught in a trap.

Prowler wakes up in a cell in Alcatraz and discovers that the hacker is the current Madame Web Julia Carpenter who has been using leftover technology from Shroud to investigate New U Technologies. Prowler angers Julia Carpenter by severing the connection to stop her from looking more into New U Technologies. Back at the company, the cloned villains are getting out of control. Jackal sends Electro to find Prowler. Electro goes to Madame Web's room and tortures the telepath into giving her Prowler's location with the intent to kill him. Julia realizes Madame Web is alive from telepathic feedback resulting from Electro's attack. Prowler tells Julia what New U Technologies has accomplished and tries to get her to join them, but she refuses and escapes in a puff of black smoke. Prowler's body begins failing due to not taking his New U pills for an extended period of time as he questions what he is doing with his life. Prowler is then found by Electro. Prowler manages to defeat the simple-minded Electro. Outside he is found by Julia, who takes him on her boat and heads toward New U Technologies to get his New U pills.

Julia helps Prowler break into New U Technologies and takes Prowler to his room to get his New U pills. As he starts recovering, Julia uses the opportunity to investigate the facility. She is led to Madame Web who refuses to take her medication to aid her in healing from Electro's attack. Madame Web has seen the future and refuses to be a part of it. Before dying of clone degeneration, Madame Web warns Julia to save Hobie. She leaves Prowler to continue looking into the facility. After recovering, Prowler aids Spider-Man in fighting the New U Technologies' villains and cloned villains when Jackal orders them to attack Spider-Man. When the alarm goes off and all the clones start breaking down from clone degeneration, Prowler leaves Haven and tries to find who set off the signal that is killing the clones. Prowler runs into Julia and accuses her of being the culprit. He tries to defeat her and Julia is left no choice but to fight back.

During the final battle, Prowler and Jean DeWolff battle the villains. The two receive assistance from Spider-Woman and Kaine. Spider-Woman leaves Prowler in an alley when he proves too weak to continue and he is found by the murderous Electro. Julia Carpenter arrives and fends Electro off as she tells Prowler that Spider-Man has stabilized the human and clone cells. When Electro gets the upper hand on Julia, Prowler sacrifices himself to stop Electro and dies in Julia's arms. In the aftermath of the fight, Julia talks to the real Prowler who just emerged from cryo-sleep and tells him about his clone's actions.

==== Silk ====
Cindy Moon, still having troubles relating to her family after returning from the Negative Zone, accepts an assignment from J. Jonah Jameson to investigate the New U facilities in San Francisco. Jameson is enthusiastic that her family is back together, but Cindy finds something off about his behavior. She and Hector Cervantez (Spectro) investigate Jameson's room in New U Technologies. Cindy's suspicions are confirmed when she finds Jameson talking with his formerly-deceased wife while Spectro finds a room with a number of test subjects in capsules. Spectro triggers the intruder alert, prompting Cindy to escape. Before Cindy can leave, she is attacked by the resurrected Mattie Franklin.

Silk and Mattie fight each other on the roof of New U Technologies. Mattie tries to convince Silk that New U Technologies is doing good work and offers Silk a tour on the condition of removing her mask, but Silk escapes. Spectro is confronted by Doctor Octopus. The two fight, but Hector is knocked out by the arrival of Electro. At Fact Channel, Cindy's co-workers and friends Rafferty and Lola look into New U Technologies for Cindy. Cindy shares Rafferty and Lola's research with Jameson, who invites her to New U's lab where he introduces her to Mattie and Marla Jameson. In a different room of the building, Doctor Octopus is experimenting with Spectro and plans to put him in a resurrected body.

After Jonah and Marla leave, Mattie takes Cindy to investigate the facility. Mattie is suspicious as some of the resurrected clones have been showing slight aberrations, and takes her to a place called "Haven" where they find Hector back in his own body. Back at Cindy's home, Mr. Moon tells Rafferty and Lola to stay out of their business while receiving instructions from a mysterious woman. At "Haven," a signal goes off that causes the clones to degrade. Hector becomes Spectro again and attacks Cindy.

J. Jonah Jameson's broadcast causes the Carrion virus to spread worldwide. Hector reverts to his ghostly form after his clone body disintegrates. The three head to the broadcast center where the Carrion virus quickly spreads due to Marla Jameson opening the doors. Spider-Man and Anna Maria Marconi arrive to stop the broadcast as Mattie reveals her superpowers to Jameson. After Spider-Man stops the Carrion virus, Jameson and Silk find Marla and Mattie reduced to dust.

==== Aftermath ====
After getting Jerry Salteres out of his pod, Spider-Man uses his Webware to allow Jerry to talk to his wife Emma. Spider-Man tells Emma that Jerry has days to live due to the accident. Emma is outraged and threatens to sue Parker Industries before she ends her call. Before Peter expresses his anger at Kaine for not warning him about the other dimensions, Max Modell arrives with S.H.I.E.L.D. and Horizon University personnel to take the exposed victims back for treatment. Kaine does not believe Ben Reilly is dead and decides to go after him after Spider-Woman heads back to her dimension. Rhino goes on a rampage after losing Oksana in New U Technologies, but Spider-Man calms him down by convincing him to move forward with his life for Oksana's sake. The two of them agree to see each other once in a while to help the other with their pain. In the sewers of San Francisco, Lizard has saved Martha and Billy Connors from the Carrion virus by injecting them with the Lizard formula, turning his wife and son into lizard creatures like himself. At a local bar, Dr. Rita Clarkson unwinds with a drink, and is met by a disguised and disfigured Ben. Though Rita has regrets what New U Technologies did, Ben still believes they were doing good for the people. He asks Rita for a loan, but she refuses until Ben saves her from some criminals who try to kill her for New U Technologies' actions. She gives Ben a kiss before he heads off towards Broadway. Later at night, Spider-Man is seen beating up the Kingpin's henchmen at a restaurant in Chinatown. Kingpin tells Spider-Man that he is ready to repay his debt and gives Spider-Man a flash drive that has the location of Norman Osborn.

== Titles involved ==
=== Lead-in issues ===
- Amazing Spider-Man vol. 4 #16–19
- Free Comic Book Day 2016 (Captain America)

=== Main issues ===
- The Clone Conspiracy #1–5

=== Tie-ins ===
- Amazing Spider-Man vol. 4 #20–24
- Prowler vol. 2 #1–5
- Silk vol. 2 #14–17

=== Aftermath issue ===
- The Clone Conspiracy: Omega #1

== Critical reception ==
The main series received generally mixed reviews. According to Comic Book Roundup, the main series received a score of 7.3 out of 10 based on 48 reviews.

According to Comic Book Roundup, Issue 1 received a score of 8 out of 10 based on 16 reviews.

According to Comic Book Roundup, Issue 2 received a score of 6.9 out of 10 based on 8 reviews.

According to Comic Book Roundup, Issue 3 received a score of 6.7 out of 10 based on 7 reviews.

According to Comic Book Roundup, Issue 4 received a score of 8.2 out of 10 based on 7 reviews.

According to Comic Book Roundup, Issue 5 received a score of 6.7 out of 10 based on 10 reviews.

According to Comic Book Roundup, The Clone Conspiracy: Omega Issue 1 received a score of 6.6 out of 10 based on 7 reviews.

== Collected editions ==
Title	Material collected	Published date	ISBN
Amazing Spider-Man Worldwide Vol. 4: Before Dead No More	Amazing Spider-Man (vol. 4) #16–19 and material from Free Comic Book Day 2016 (Captain America)	January 2017	978-1302902377
Amazing Spider-Man: Worldwide Vol. 5: Dead No More	Amazing Spider-Man (vol. 4) #20–24	May 2017	978-1302902384
Amazing Spider-Man: Worldwide Vol. 3	Amazing Spider-Man (vol. 4) #20–28 and Annual #1	February 2018	978-1302908911
Prowler: The Clone Conspiracy	Prowler #1–5	July 2017	978-1302906559
Silk Vol. 3: The Clone Conspiracy	Silk (vol. 2) #14–19	August 2017	978-1302905934
Amazing Spider-Man: The Clone Conspiracy	Amazing Spider-Man (vol. 4) #19–24, The Clone Conspiracy #1–5, The Clone Conspiracy: Omega, Silk (vol. 2) #14–17, Prowler #1–5 and material from Free Comic Book Day 2016 (Captain America)	December 2017	978-1302905996

== In other media ==
"Dead No More: The Clone Conspiracy" is somewhat adapted in the first season of Spider-Man. His plot involving clones and Jackal-mutated armies draws inspiration from modern clone arcs, particularly that storyline.
