= Spider-Men =

2012 superhero comic book miniseries

- Original cover

Publication information
- Publisher: Marvel Comics
- Schedule: Monthly
- Format: Limited series
- Genre: Superhero
- Publication date: June – September 2012
- No. of issues: 5
- Main characters: Peter Parker; Miles Morales; Mysterio

Creative team
- Written by: Brian Michael Bendis
- Penciller: Sara Pichelli

Spider-Men is a five-issue, 2012 superhero comic book miniseries published by Marvel Comics, featuring Peter Parker, the original Spider-Man, and Miles Morales, the second and current Ultimate Marvel version of Spider-Man, who appear together in a crossover storyline that involves the two alternate universes from which they each originate. The series is written by Brian Michael Bendis and illustrated by Sara Pichelli. It marks the first time that characters from the original Marvel Universe and the Ultimate Universe have crossed over since the latter debuted in 2000.

== Plot ==
While out web-swinging, Spider-Man sees a brilliant purple light from a distant warehouse, and investigates it to find Mysterio ranting about how he missed out on one chance to kill Spider-Man already. Although Spider-Man quickly defeats him, when examining Mysterio's equipment, he is shot at by Mysterio, causing him to fall through the rift created by the equipment. When he regains consciousness, he discovers that it is daylight. After interrupting a mugging, Peter is confused when the would-be victim informs him that, while he is grateful for the rescue, it might be disrespectful to be seen wearing Peter Parker's suit after his death. Swinging away to think about what he has just heard, Spider-Man runs into another Spider-Man on a rooftop.

Angered at Spider-Man ruining his plans again, Mysterio activates a robotic avatar and sends it after Peter. Back in the new universe, Peter fights with the other Spider-Man, but his superior experience and training is outmaneuvered by Miles' new powers, culminating in Peter being knocked out by Miles using his venom sting. Waking up in a cell, Peter meets this world's Nick Fury and explains his theory that he is from another universe, which Fury accepts as nobody would come up with something that ridiculous as a lie. Fury sends Peter away with Miles to explain this world's history to him. Just as Peter asks Miles if his counterpart is dead in this world, they are attacked by Mysterio's avatar.

Both Spider-Men face off against Mysterio's Avatar. Due to Miles' lack of experience, he is easily thrown back into Peter, and they both end up in the East River. Mysterio deploys weapons that create the illusion of a mob of Spider-Man's enemies from both realities attacking them. Peter figures out the trick and demands Mysterio return him to his home universe. Mysterio decides to instead strand Peter in a world where he is believed to be dead. The avatar self-destructs, rendering Miles unconscious; when he wakes, the Ultimates and Nick Fury are on the scene. While his version of Tony Stark works on deciphering Mysterio's dimension technology, Miles asks where Peter went. Fury surmises that he went off to find out the truth about his alternate self. Peter goes to the location where his apartment in his home universe is supposed to be. Peter finds it to be converted into a store, and after stopping a robbery, he questions the cashier. He is shocked to find out that the Peter Parker of this world died in battle and that the city is still in mourning, and that it is also common knowledge that Peter Parker was Spider-Man. Distraught over the news, he swings over to Queens where the Parker residence is currently up for sale. May Parker is seeing off Gwen Stacy to school. When they see Peter in his costume, they believe he is a lunatic disrespecting the memory of the deceased Peter Parker, and are shocked beyond words when Peter unmasks.

Miles arrives and confirms Peter's story. Talking with Gwen and Miles, Peter confirms that Gwen exists in his world without mentioning that her counterpart is dead. He also mentions his relationship with Mary Jane Watson and is shocked to hear that his counterpart dated Kitty Pryde, while Miles is left curious whether he has a counterpart in Peter's world. As Fury arrives to pick Peter up, Peter sees Mary Jane watching him, but she runs away before he can talk to her. Returning to the Helicarrier, Peter learns that Stark is having trouble determining how he can identify Peter's world of origin amid the multitude of alternate universes. With Miles' help, the Ultimates determine the location of Mysterio's headquarters based on the energy generated by his equipment, prompting the heroes to suit up and head for the base.

At his headquarters, Mysterio is preparing to cement his victory by destroying the portal and trapping Spider-Man in the Ultimate universe. Unable to resist the temptation to see how his enemy is faring, he keeps the portal open long enough for Peter and the Ultimates to capture him. Despite his best efforts, Mysterio is quickly defeated, and Fury decides to keep him prisoner on their side of the rift due to his knowledge of Peter's secret identity. With the portal closing, Peter departs for his world after giving Miles his blessing as the new Spider-Man of this world. Back in his world, Peter runs a search for Miles' counterpart in his world and is shocked at the result.

== Publication history ==
Initially, the Ultimate Marvel imprint had no crossovers with the mainstream Marvel comics. At the 2005 San Diego Comic-Con, Joe Quesada said that if the mainstream and Ultimate Marvel universes ever crossed over, it would signify that Marvel "had officially run out of ideas."

Brian Michael Bendis and Axel Alonso made the first crossover in 2012, after 13 years of the Ultimate Marvel imprint, to celebrate the 50th anniversary of Spider-Man. Alonso described the story with:

All I can say is that the Peter Parker of the Ultimate Universe casts a huge shadow over Miles' spiritual and emotional development. What will he do when he's confronted with the Peter Parker from another universe? Well, that's the story. And there are a couple of things going on. First, Miles is meeting someone who's the closest flesh-and-blood thing to his actual biggest hero. Second, he's being shown a window into an entire new universe. That's mind-bending stuff for a young kid to come to terms with." Alonso went on to reveal that "there's a super-cool villain involved in all of this and it's mind-bending, twisted stuff that puts these two in each others' orbit. We don't break down the wall between the Marvel Universe and the Ultimate Universe lightly."

The first issue was released on June 13, 2012.

== Reception ==
The series received generally positive reviews. The individual issues hold an average rating of 8.1 out of 10 on the review aggregator website Comic Book Roundup, based on 85 total reviews of all five issues, which range in rating from 7.3 (issue 1) and 8.5 (issue 4).

Joey Esposito of IGN, who gave the first issue an 8.5 out of 10, praised the creative team, singling out the strong thematic elements set up by Bendis, and the graceful line work, cityscapes, action and comedic timing of Pichelli's art. Esposito also complimented Cory Petit's lettering, comparing his use of different fonts when Spider-Man arrives in the Ultimate Universe to the use of color that characterizes Dorothy's arrival in Oz in the 1939 film The Wizard of Oz. James Hunt of Comic Book Resources, who gave the issue four and a half out of five stars, called it "one of the most momentous Spider-Man stories to be published in years", praising the issue's pace and tone, and Pichelli's art.

== Sequel ==
There was a second miniseries, Spider-Men II, released in 2017. It was a new team-up of Peter and Miles, now both living in the mainstream Marvel universe. It also features the native Miles Morales of the mainstream universe, an adult and close friend of the Kingpin. At the end of the story, the adult Morales moves into the Ultimate Marvel universe, which had been destroyed in the 2015 Secret Wars crossover. This remade the Ultimate universe, Peter Parker is now Spider-Man again and has joined the Ultimates.

== In other media ==
- Elements of this story are incorporated into the plot of Spider-Man: Into the Spider-Verse. Like in the original story, Peter Parker is brought into Miles' dimension, not long after the death of his counterpart there, as the result of a villain's schemes involving multiversal travel (though in this case, it's the Kingpin from Miles' universe).
