= List of Spider-Man enemies =

Depiction of the many Spider-Man villains in a dream sequence of Spider-Man in The Sensational Spider-Man (vol. 2) #32. Art by Sean Chen. (Click on a character to visit their article.)

Spider-Man is a superhero created by Marvel Comics who debuted in the anthology comic book series issue Amazing Fantasy #15 (August 1962) during the Silver Age of Comics. After his debut, he received his own comic book entitled The Amazing Spider-Man. This comic introduced many of what would become his major supervillain adversaries. Spider-Man then became popular enough for more Spider-Man comic spinoffs (The Spectacular Spider-Man, Marvel Team-Up, Web of Spider-Man, Peter Parker: Spider-Man etc.) which introduced more recurring enemies of the web-slinger, across their various incarnations.

As with Spider-Man, most of his villains' powers originate from scientific accidents or the misuse of scientific technology. They can be classified into multiple categories, such as animal-themed villains (Doctor Octopus, Vulture, Lizard, Rhino, Scorpion, Kraven the Hunter, Jackal, Beetle, Kangaroo, Tarantula, and Puma), villains with powers over the elements (Sandman, Electro, Molten Man, and Hydro-Man), horror-themed villains (the Green Goblin, the Hobgoblin, Morbius, Morlun, and the Symbiotes), crime lords (the Kingpin, Tombstone, Hammerhead, Silvermane, and Mister Negative), inventors (the Shocker, the Tinkerer, Spencer Smythe, and Alistair Smythe), and masters of trickery and illusion (the Chameleon and Mysterio). There are, however, numerous villains that do not fit into any specific category, such as Mephisto, who originated as a Silver Surfer villain. The villains oftentimes form teams such as the Sinister Six to oppose the web-slinger.

Spider-Man is notable for having numerous villains that redeemed themselves and became antiheroes, such as Puma, the Prowler, Morbius, Kraven, Sandman and Silver Sable. Also, unlike most superheroes, Spider-Man does not have one particular archenemy, but rather three: the Norman Osborn version of the Green Goblin, the Otto Octavius version of Doctor Octopus, and the Eddie Brock version of Venom, the latter two of whom have been similarly redeemed and depicted as antiheroes; since the late 2000s, the demon Mephisto has additionally been depicted as an overarching archenemy/prominent adversary of all incarnations of Spider-Man.

The rogues gallery of Spider-Man has garnered critical acclaim and has been considered one of the greatest rogues galleries of all time.

== Supervillains and themed criminals ==
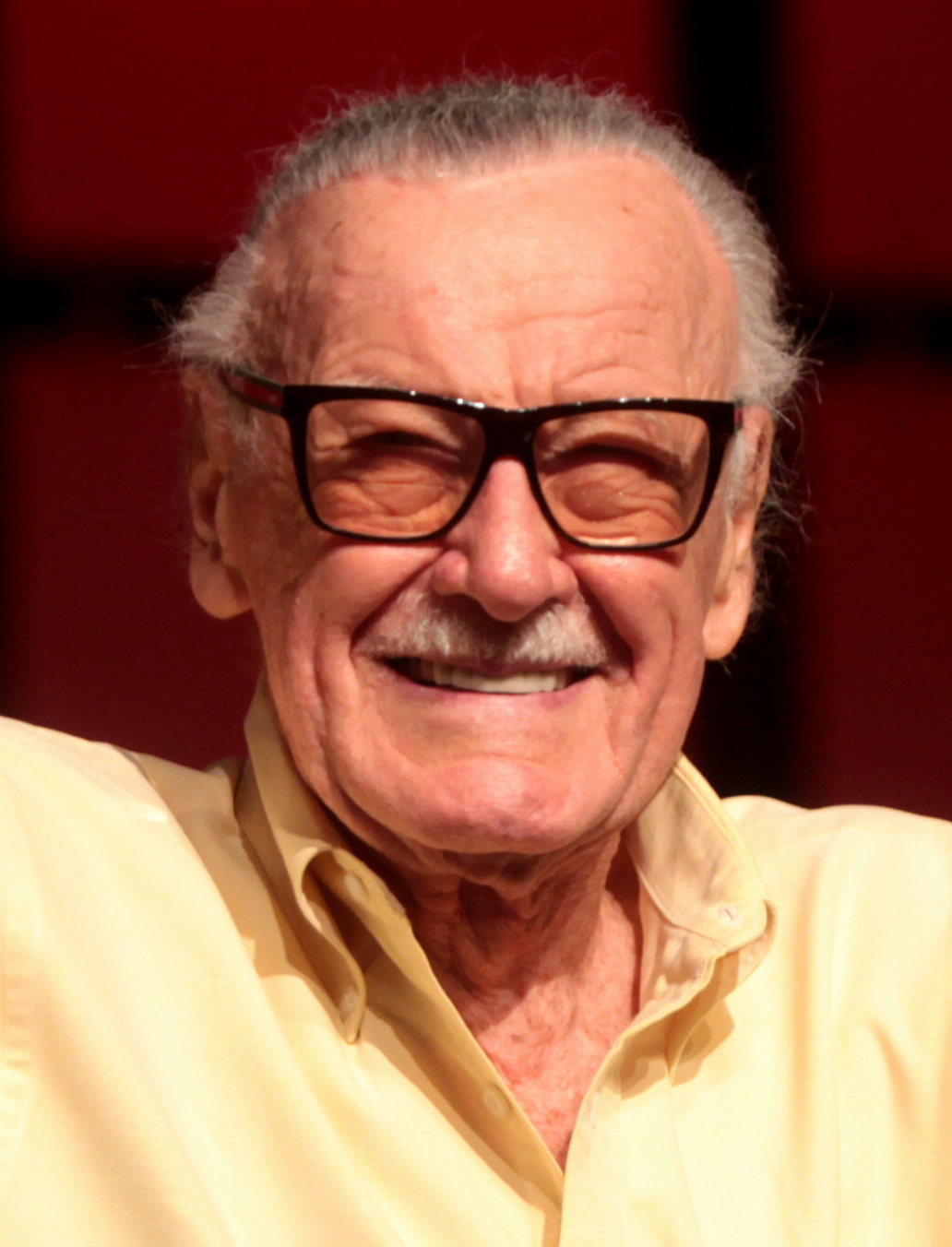
Stan Lee is responsible with helping create the most villains for the web-slinger and helped pave the way for the fictional rogues gallery.

The majority of supervillains depicted in Spider-Man comics first appeared in The Amazing Spider-Man, while some first appeared in spinoff comics such as The Spectacular Spider-Man and Marvel Team-Up and other titles.

=== The Amazing Spider-Man debuts ===
Most of the supervillains of Spider-Man would be introduced in The Amazing Spider-Man comic book starting with the Chameleon. The early villains would be introduced in the 1960s during the Silver Age of Comic Books, and created by Stan Lee and Steve Ditko. John Romita Sr. replaced Ditko starting with the Rhino. Gerry Conway later replaced Stan Lee and helped create new adversaries for the web-slinger and also helped pave the way for the Bronze Age of Comic Books with the death of Spider-Man's long-time romantic interest, Gwen Stacy. Many collaborators would soon take over The Amazing Spider-Man title. One of the more popular examples included Todd McFarlane's Venom in the Modern Age of Comic Books.

Note: Alter ego characters who are the most high profile in the supervillain alias but have shared that alias with others are in bold. Alter egos listed having N/A use their real name as supervillain name. All the villains are listed in the chronological order of their debut in comics. Characters of the central rogues gallery are in bold.

=== Central rogues gallery ===
Name	Notable alter ego	First appearance issue #	Creator	Descriptions
**Chameleon**^{1}	**Dmitri Anatoly Nikolayevich Smerdyakov**	#1 (March 1963)	Stan Lee; Steve Ditko	A master of disguise who can make himself look like anybody
**Vulture**	**Adrian Toomes**	#2 (May 1963)	Stan Lee; Steve Ditko	An elderly inventor who created mechanical wings that allow him to fly and grant him superhuman strength
**Doctor Octopus**^{Arch1}	**Dr. Otto Gunther Octavius**	#3 (July 1963)	Stan Lee; Steve Ditko	Originally a brilliant scientist, his greatest invention, a set of metallic limbs, became fused to his body by an accident which caused his insanity. He has telepathic control of these arms, which are strong enough to physically hurt Spider-Man. While Doctor Octopus is regarded as one of Spider-Man's archenemies, he has also been portrayed as an antihero, and even starred in his own comic book storyline that saw him becoming a superhero called the Superior Spider-Man after the original Spider-Man's death.
**Sandman**^{2}	**William Baker / Flint Marko**	#4 (September 1963)	Stan Lee; Steve Ditko	Once a small-time crook, he became a supervillain after his body merged with sand which he can manipulate in many ways, such as shapeshifting, increasing his density and strength to lift up to 85 tons, and creating dust storms from his body.
**Lizard**	**Dr. Curtis "Curt" Connors** Peter Benjamin Parker (Earth 65)	#6 (November 1963)	Stan Lee; Steve Ditko	A scientist researching genetics, he injected himself with an experimental serum made from reptile DNA which transformed him into a humanoid lizard. As the Lizard, he has regeneration abilities, along with superhuman strength, speed, and agility. He has sometimes been shown as being able to telepathically command all reptiles within a one-mile radius.
**Electro**^{3}	**Maxwell Dillon**	#9 (February 1964)	Stan Lee; Steve Ditko	Originally a lineman for an electric company, he turned to a life of crime after being struck by lightning while working on a power line and becoming a living electric capacitor. His powers range from shooting electricity bolts to flight and superhuman strength and speed, which makes him one of Spider-Man's most dangerous enemies.
**Mysterio**^{4}	**Quentin Beck**; Daniel Berkhart; Francis Klum	#13 (June 1964)	Stan Lee; Steve Ditko	A master of illusion who uses special effects, hypnosis, and an extensive knowledge of chemistry and robotics to trick his enemies
**Green Goblin**^{Arch2}	**Norman Osborn** (first Green Goblin)^{Arch2} Harry Osborn (second Green Goblin)	#14 (July 1964)	Stan Lee; Steve Ditko	The first Green Goblin, Norman Osborn, is the CEO of Oscorp and has powers derived from a "Goblin formula" that increases agility, endurance, strength, and reflexes to superhuman levels. The formula has also advances the intelligence while causing insanity as a side effect. He uses an arsenal of weapons created by Oscorp, such as pumpkin bombs and a personal glider. The Norman version of the Green Goblin is usually regarded as Spider-Man's archenemy. The second Goblin, Harry Osborn, is Norman's son and Peter Parker's best friend. He has the same powers as his father.
**Kraven the Hunter**^{5}	**Sergei Kravinoff**; Alyosha Kravinoff (son); Ana Kravinoff (daughter)	#15 (August 1964)	Stan Lee; Steve Ditko	Depicted as the world's greatest big-game hunter, Kraven is skilled in hand-to-hand combat, though he also uses a "magic jungle potion" to increase his speed, strength, and tracking skills. He aims to kill Spider-Man, whom he regards as his equal, to prove himself as the world's greatest hunter, and is also the half-brother of the Chameleon.
**Scorpion**^{6}	**Mac Gargan**^{6}	#20 (January 1965)	Stan Lee; Steve Ditko	A former private investigator who underwent a test that made him more powerful than Spider-Man, at the cost of his sanity. He gained the superhuman strength of a scorpion, and was provided with a scorpion-themed suit and weaponry (such as a tail which evolved from a simple club tail to a scythe-like spike capable of shooting lasers, acid among other projectiles). Gargan later became the third host of the Venom symbiote.
**Rhino**^{7}	**Aleksei Mikhailovich Sytsevich**	#41 (October 1966)	Stan Lee; John Romita Sr.	A Russian thug who was given a rhinoceros-modeled armor, which give him superhuman strength and resistance, after undergoing a chemical and radiation treatment. After escaping from his handlers, he used his newfound powers to become a supervillain.
**Shocker**	**Herman Schultz**	#46 (March 1967)	Stan Lee; John Romita Sr.	A former small-time criminal who built himself a battle suit that contains vibro-shock gauntlets.
**Kingpin**^{8}	**Wilson Grant Fisk**	#50 (July 1967)	Stan Lee; John Romita Sr.	Depicted as crime lord of New York City. Manipulate henchman to do his bidding. His body consists of mostly muscle (despite looking like he is obese) that has much strength and agility. Enough to grapple and hammer Spider-Man.
**Hobgoblin**	**Roderick Kingsley**; Ned Leeds; Jason Macendale; Phil Urich	#238 (March 1983)	Roger Stern; John Romita Sr.	An amoral billionaire fashion designer, Roderick Kingsley perfected the formula that transformed Norman Osborn into the Green Goblin, which granted him superhuman strength and intelligence without Osborn's insanity. Using a vast arsenal of weapons similar to the Green Goblin's, including pumpkin bombs, razor-sharp bats and a goblin glider, Kingsley became the criminal mastermind known as the Hobgoblin.
**Venom**^{Arch3}	**Eddie Brock** (first Venom)^{Arch3} Mac Gargan (second Venom)	#300 (May 1988)^{12}	David Michelinie; Todd McFarlane	Eddie Brock is a former reporter who blamed Spider-Man for ruining this career and his life. He became Venom after binding with the symbiote that once merged with Spider-Man. As Venom, he has the same powers as Spider-Man, and aims to ruin his life in any way he can. He is also undetectable to Spider-Man's spider sense. While Venom grew to be regarded as one of Spider-Man's archenemies, later comic book storylines depict him as an antihero, and he even reluctantly teamed up with Spider-Man when the lives of innocent people were at risk. Other character have also been the host of the Venom symbiote, including Mac Gargan, who became the second Venom.
**Carnage**	**Cletus Kasady**	#361 (April 1992)^{13}	David Michelinie; Erik Larsen; Mark Bagley	An offspring of the Venom symbiote merged with a serial killer. Carnage possess powers such as shapeshifting and creating weapons from his body. He can also plant ideas in people's heads.

=== Foes of lesser renown that originated in The Amazing Spider-Man ===
Name	Notable alter ego	First appearance issue #	Creator	Descriptions
Tinkerer	Phineas T. Mason	#2 (May 1963)	Stan Lee; Steve Ditko	A gifted engineer who specializes in creating gadgets from just about anything
Living Brain	N/A	#8 (January 1964)	Stan Lee; Steve Ditko	A living robot that is designed to solve any problem
Big Man	Frederick Foswell	#10 (March 1964)	Stan Lee; Steve Ditko	A notorious crime lord in New York City
The Smythe Family / Spider-Slayers	Spencer Smythe (Father); Alistair Smythe (Son); Spider-Slayers: (Multiple Names)	#25 (June 1965)	Stan Lee; Steve Ditko	The Smythe Family are robotic experts who create various deadly weapons known as "Spider-Slayers" for the purpose of hunting down Spider-Man. Spencer Smythe is the initial antagonist who creates the first Spider-Slayer on behalf of J Jonah Jameson. Alistair Smythe is the paternal son of Spencer Smythe who was crippled after a lab accident while helping his father with his work. Alistair fully inherits the Spider-Slayer legacy following his father's death, eventually enhancing himself with his own technology to increase his strength and return his ability to walk. Following this upgrade Alistair takes on the alias of "The Spider-Slayer"
Crime Master	Various	#26 (July 1965)	Stan Lee; Steve Ditko	A professional criminal who was the alias of different people
Molten Man	Mark Raxton	#28 (September 1965)	Stan Lee; Steve Ditko	A scientist who was covered in a liquid metallic alloy that not only gives him super-strength, but also enabled him to generate heat and radiation.
Looter	Norton G. Fester	#36 (May 1966)	Stan Lee; Steve Ditko	A poor scientist who gains superpowers from meteor gas
Robot Master / Gaunt	Mendel Stromm	#37 (June 1966)	Stan Lee; Steve Ditko	A former college teacher and partner of Norman Osborn who became a cyborg after being betrayed by Osborn
Finisher	Karl Fiers	Annual #5 (November 1968)	Stan Lee; Larry Lieber	
Man Mountain Marko	Michael Marko	#73 (June 1969)	Stan Lee; John Romita Sr.	A Maggia lieutenant to Silvermane with super-strength
Silvermane	Silvio Manfredi	#73 (June 1969)	Stan Lee; John Buscema	An aging crime boss who is later turned into a cyborg with superhuman strength
Prowler	Hobie Brown Aaron Davis (Ultimate); Miles Morales (Earth 42)	#78 (November 1969)	Stan Lee; John Buscema	An African-American teenage prodigy created the Prowler Technology; donning a green and purple battle suit with a cape and clawed gauntlets in order to operate as a petty thief. The "Ultimate" version was depicted as the uncle of Miles Morales.
Kangaroo	Frank Oliver; Brian Hibbs	#81 (February 1970)	Stan Lee; John Buscema; Jim Mooney; John Romita Sr.	A name given to two kangaroo-themed villains
Schemer	Richard Fisk	#83 (April 1970)	Stan Lee; John Romita Sr.	The son of the Kingpin
Morbius	Michael Morbius	#101 (October 1971)^{9}	Roy Thomas; Gil Kane	A formerly renowned biochemist who was mutated into a vampire. He has all the powers and weaknesses of a vampire. Later comic book storylines depict him as a tragic antihero.
Gog	N/A	#103 (December 1971)	Roy Thomas; Gil Kane	An alien was found by Kraven the Hunter and adopted as a pet. He quickly grew gigantic in size, and possesses superhuman strength and bracelets that allow interdimensional teleportation.
Gibbon	Martin Blank	#110 (July 1972)	Stan Lee; John Romita Sr.	A lesser criminal with gibbon-like abilities
Hammerhead	Joseph (full name unrevealed)	#113 (October 1972)	Gerry Conway; John Romita Sr.	A mobster who had most of his skull replaced with an unbendable steel alloy
Man-Wolf	John Jameson	#124 (September 1973).	Gerry Conway	The son of J.Jonah Jameson, John was transformed into a werewolf-like creature after being exposed to the alien Godstone. He has been depicted as both a villain and hero.
Jackal	Miles Warren	#129 (February 1974)^{10}	Gerry Conway^{10} Ross Andru^{10}	A brilliant professor with the knowledge of cloning, which he uses to torment Spider-Man emotionally. The Jackal possesses superhuman strength, speed, and agility. There are two versions of the Jackal that operate independently of each other; the original being Miles Warren, while his clone goes by the alias of Carrion.
Tarantula	Various	#134 (July 1974)	Gerry Conway; Ross Andru	A name given to different tarantula-themed villains
Mindworm	William Turner	#138 (November 1974)	Gerry Conway; Ross Andru	A superhuman with telepathic powers
Grizzly	Maxwell Markham	#139 (December 1974)	Gerry Conway; Ross Andru	An ex-professional wrestler who wears a grizzly bear-themed outfit
Human Fly	Richard Deacon	Annual #10 (1976)	Len Wein; Bill Mantlo; Gil Kane	A criminal who was imprinted with the genetic code of a housefly
Will o' the Wisp	Jackson Arvad	#167 (April 1977)	Len Wein; Ross Andru	A former Roxxon employee who can manipulate his molecules
Big Wheel	Jackson Wheele	#182 (July 1978)	Marv Wolfman; Ross Andru; Mike Esposito	A criminal who rides the Big Wheel vehicle
Calypso	Calypso Ezili	#209 (October 1980)	Dennis O'Neil; Alan Weiss	An accomplice of Kraven the Hunter who uses voodoo potions and magic
Hydro-Man	Morris Bench	#212 (January 1981)	Denny O'Neil; John Romita Jr.	A former crewman who gained aquakinetic abilities following an accident during Spider-Man's fight with Namor.
Rose	Richard Fisk	#253 (June 1984)	Tom DeFalco	The alias of a gentleman-like crime lord with the alias used by different people most notably Kingpin's son Richard Fisk
Puma	Thomas Fireheart	#256 (September 1984)	Tom Defalco	A Native American who was bred to be a perfect warrior prophesied to stop a future threat that might destroy the world, gaining the ability to transform into a mountain lion werecat at will.
Slyde	Jalome Beacher	#272 (January 1986)	Tom DeFalco; Sal Buscema	A chemist whose suit allow him to move at nearly 30 miles per hour (48 km/h). He is almost impossible to grasp and he is incredibly maneuverable
Styx and Stone	Jacob Eichorn and Gerald Stone	#309 (November 1988)	David Michelinie; Todd McFarlane	A mad scientist and homeless man duo who fought Spider-Man as well as the Hulk, Venom and Cardiac. Styx has a disintegrating touch. Stone had two-large weapons on his shoulders and was later mutated into a golem-like creature.
Delilah	Unrevealed	#414 (June 1996)	Tom DeFalco; Mark Bagley	A highly skilled and ruthless assassin who came under the employ of the Rose during one of the many crime-boss gang wars and became his confidante as well as his chief enforcer.
Black Tarantula	Carlos LaMuerto	#419 (January 1997)	Tom DeFalco; Steve Skroce	A tarantula-themed martial artist
Morlun	N/A	vol. 2 #30 (June 2001)	J. Michael Straczynski; John Romita Jr.	A member of the Inheritors who can drain the life force of Spider-Totems.
Shathra	N/A	vol. 2 #46 (November 2002)	J. Michael Straczynski; John Romita Jr. Scott Hanna	An insectoid creature from the Astral Plane
Gray Goblin	Gabriel Stacy; Lily Hollister (Menace)	#509 (August 2004) #550 (April 2008) (Menace)	J. Michael Straczynski; Mike Deodato	A gray-resembling Green Goblin whose alias was used by different people
Mister Negative	Martin Li	#546 (January 2008) (full appearance)	Dan Slott; Phil Jimenez	A crime boss and leader of the Inner Demons gang, who can swap between his normal appearance and his alter ego. His powers include a healing touch, mind control, and the ability to charge regular weapons with his energy.
Overdrive	James Beverley	Swing Shift (May 2007)	Dan Slott; Phil Jimenez	A supervillain who can convert any vehicle into a high-powered one.
Freak	Unknown	#546 (January 2008)	Dan Slott; Steve McNiven	A drug addict turned into a superpowered being able to adapt to injuries by metamorphing into new forms. Also referred to as Armadillo Man.
Screwball	Unknown	#559 (May 2008)	Dan Slott; Marcos Martín	The world's first "live-streaming super-villain"
Massacre	Marcus Lyman	#655 (April 2011)	Dan Slott; Marcos Martín	A brain-damaged criminal who lacks emotions
Panda-Mania	Unknown	Vol. 3 #1	Dan Slott; Humberto Ramos	A panda-themed supervillain
Regent	Augustus Roman	Vol. 4 #1	Dan Slott; Christos Gage; Paco Diaz	The CEO of Empire Unlimited whose suit enables him to copy the powers of anyone imprisoned in his stasis tubes. A version of the character from Earth-18119 first appeared in Amazing Spider-Man: Renew Your Vows as part of the "Secret Wars" storyline.
Kindred	Gabriel Stacy Sarah Stacy	Vol. 5 #5	Nick Spencer; Ryan Ottley	A human-turned-demon who has been revealed as Gabriel & Sarah Stacy.

=== The Spectacular Spider-Man debuts ===
Note: In chronological order

Name	Alter ego	First appearance	Description
Lightmaster	Dr. Edward Lansky	#3 (February 1977)	A physics professor and vice-chancellor of Empire State University who became a criminal mastermind as a way to prevent budget cuts for higher education. He created a unique special power armor suit which utilized "gravity-pump circuitry" to allow him to manipulate photons for a variety of effects.
Carrion	Various	#25 (December 1978)	Originally a clone of Miles Warren (the Jackal), he can levitate, kill by touch, control his density and telepathy. The first Carrion was killed by an amoeba-like clone of Peter Parker, and since then other incarnations of him has appeared.
Iguana	None	#32 (July 1979)	An accident occurs while Curt Connors experiments on an ordinary iguana, endowing the iguana with part of Connors' lifeforce and memories, as well as the personality and powers of Connors' alter ego, the Lizard. The Iguana becomes a human-sized semi-humanoid reptile with superhuman strength, hypnotic powers, and the ability to mentally control other reptiles.
Answer	Aaron Nicholson	#91 (June 1984)	
Spot	Jonathan Ohnn	#98 (January 1985)	A scientist with the ability to create portals that lead to an alternate dimension and instantly cross short distances
Foreigner	Kris Keating	#115 (June 1986)	A master mercenary and assassin.
Sin-Eater	Stanley Carter	#107 (October 1986)	Multiple abilities ranging from artificially heightened physicality, to supernatural energy manipulation and self-healing. Was instrumental in the creation of Venom, and is also a reoccurring villain of Ghost Rider.
Lobo Brothers	Carlos and Eduardo Lobo	#149 (October 1988)	Two brothers who become werewolves and Drug cartel members who expanded into Texas.
Spidercide	None	#222 (January 1995)	Introduced as a red herring to suggest the possibility of a third individual that was the original Peter Parker during the "Maximum Clonage" story arc, he is one of the Spider-Man clones created by Jackal, to be Jackal's enforcer and protector. However, Spidercide is actually a clone of Ben Reilly, who is himself a clone of Spider-Man.

=== Marvel Team-Up debuts ===
Note: In chronological order

Name	Alter ego	First appearance	Creator	Description
Stegron	Vincent Stegron	Marvel Team-Up #19 (March 1974)	Len Wein; Gil Kane	A scientist who became a humanoid Stegosaurus using the same method that turned Curt Connors into Lizard.
Magma	Jonathan Darque	Marvel Team-Up #110 (Octocber 1981)	Herb Trimpe; David Michelinie; Mike Esposito	A CEO of a mining company that engineers a battlesuit capable of withstanding great heat and firing balls of lava.
Witch-Slayer	Cotton Mather	Marvel Team-Up #41 (January 1976)	Bill Mantlo, Sal Buscema	A witch-hunter of Salem, Massachusetts in the 17th century who had been given access to mystical power by the Dark Rider.
White Rabbit	Dr. Lorina Dodson	Marvel Team-Up #131 (July 1983)	J. M. DeMatteis; Kerry Gammill; Mike Esposito	A rabbit-themed supervillain, who pilots a giant rabbit mech and has a large arsenal of weapons at her disposal.
Black Abbot	Unknown	Marvel Team-Up #147 (November 1984)	Cary Burkett; Greg LaRocque	A former monk of Dakoth-Kuru, a sect that had managed to use their teachings to unlock the full potential of their minds, giving them incredible mental powers. The Black Abbot had more powers, including the ability to control the twelve others and took control of the entire brotherhood.
Incandescent Man	Unknown	Marvel Team-Up #149 (January 1985)	Louise Simonson; Bret Blevins	Following an experiment by Project Pegasus, he gained the ability to draw electrical energy into one's body.

=== Debuting in other Spider-Man titles ===
Note: In chronological order

Name	Alter ego	First appearance	Creator	Description
Tombstone	Alonzo "Lonnie" Thompson Lincoln	Web of Spider-Man #36 (March 1988)	Gerry Conway; Alex Saviuk	An albino mob enforcer
Shriek	Frances Louise Barrison	Spider-Man Unlimited #1 (May 1993)	Ron Lim; Mark Bagley; Mike W. Barr; Tom DeFalco; Jerry Bingham; Terry Kavanagh	A sound-manipulating supervillain
Coldheart	Kateri Deseronto	Spider-Man #49 (June 1994)	Tom Lyle; Howard Mackie	An expert martial artist and swordsman who wields Cryonic Swords that can freeze anyone in their place.

=== Debuting outside Spider-Man titles ===
Name	Alter ego	First appearance	Description
Beetle	Abner Jenkins Janice Lincoln	Strange Tales #123 (August 1964)	A master mechanic who wears a beetle-themed armor that went on to become the founder of The Sinister Syndicate. After Abner rebranded himself as MACH-1 to joined the initial incarnation of The Thunderbolts, Janice Lincoln, the paternal daughter of Tombstone, took over the mantle and went onto lead her own version of The Sinister Syndicate.
Boomerang	Fred Myers	Tales to Astonish #81 (July 1966)	A former baseball player who uses boomerangs as weapons
Mephisto	Stan Lee; John Buscema	The Silver Surfer #3 (December 1968; originally)	A demon who manipulates Spider-Man and other superheroes into making deals with him. He is responsible for Norman Osborn's and his son Harry's initial transformations into the Green Goblin, and manipulating Norman into trading away Harry's soul and facilitating the latter's torment and transformation into the demonic Kindred. Mephisto is also responsible for manipulating Spider-Man into erasing his marriage to Mary Jane Watson from the timeline in exchange for resurrecting May Parker, and erasing his future daughter and adversary from existence.
Ringer	Anthony Davis	The Defenders #51 (June 1977)	A supervillain who wields ring-based weapons
Swarm	Fritz von Meyer	The Champions #14 (July 1977)	A former Nazi and beekeeper whose skeleton is surrounded by a swarm of bees
Jack O'Lantern	Jason Macendale	Machine Man #19 (February 1981)	A jack-o'-lantern-themed villain whose alias was used by different people.
Speed Demon	James Sanders	The Avengers #70 (November 1960) (as the Whizzer); The Amazing Spider-Man #222 (November 1981)	A chemist with super-speed and former member of the Squadron Sinister
Vermin	Edward Whelan	Captain America #272 (August 1982)	A geneticist who was turned into a humanoid rat by Arnim Zola
Doppelganger	Spider-Doppelganger	The Infinity War #1 (July 1992)	A nearly-mindless duplicate of Spider-Man
Proto-Goblin	Nels van Adder	Spider-Man #-1 (July 1997)	In a retcon, Norman Osborn tests the incomplete version of the formula on Oscorp employee **Nels van Adder**, driving van Adder insane and causing him to transform into a demonic being known as the "**Proto-Goblin**". Killing several people and blaming Norman for his condition, van Adder harasses and later attempts to kill him before being knocked out an Oscorp window by Chief of Security Arthur Stacy and his brother Detective George Stacy. In order to escape conviction for what he had done to van Adder, Norman convinces the police that van Adder had been experimenting on himself and that he had been trying to help him. Van Adder was last seen fleeing into the wilderness and his current fate is unknown. As well as endowing van Adder with super strength and agility, the prototypical Goblin Formula gave him claws and near-impenetrable red skin that is capable of withstanding several close range bullet shots.
Hippo	Mrs. Fluffy Lumpkins	Dark Reign: The Sinister Spider-Man #1 (August 2009)	A hippopotamus who was uplifted by the High Evolutionary and gained an anthropomorphic form.

== Non-supervillain enemies ==
Name	First appearance	Description
Burglar	Amazing Fantasy #15 (August 1962)	The man who killed Peter's uncle, which would inspire him to use his powers responsibly and become Spider-Man.
Flash Thompson	Amazing Fantasy #15 (August 1962)	Early on, Flash Thompson was usually depicted as an enemy of Peter Parker and an ardent admirer of Spider-Man. He is Peter's classmate who enjoys bullying him, while ironically being one of Spider-Man's biggest fans. Later on, Flash would become good friends with Peter. In The Amazing Spider-Man #654, Flash came into contact with the Venom symbiote and became the superhero Agent Venom.
J. Jonah Jameson	The Amazing Spider-Man #1 (March 1963)	The editor in chief of the Daily Bugle and Peter Parker's boss. He has a strong hatred of Spider-Man and tries his best to turn the city against him by publishing fake news about him, or changing them to make it look like Spider-Man is in cahoots with the villains he is fighting. He was also responsible for the funding of the creation of Scorpion, the Spider-Slayers, and the Human Fly.

== Miles Morales: Spider-Man villains ==
Miles Morales is a superhero and the third predominant Spider-Man to appear in American comic books published by Marvel Comics, created in 2011 by writer Brian Michael Bendis and artist Sara Pichelli, along with input by Marvel's then-editor-in-chief Axel Alonso.

He debuted in Ultimate Comics: Fallout #4. Originally from the alternate Ultimate Marvel Universe Earth-1610 before being transported to the main Marvel Universe Earth-616.

After his debut Miles appeared in multiple ongoing series including Ultimate Comics Spider-Man and Miles Morales: Ultimate Spider-Man where he faced numerous villains that were either previous Peter Parker: Ultimate Spider-Man villains, or Ultimate Universe versions of Main Universe Spider-Man villains. Following his introduction to the main Marvel Universe he appeared in Spider-Man (2016) and Miles Morales: Spider-Man, which introduced new recurring enemies.

=== Ultimate Marvel Universe debuts ===
Note: In chronological order

Name	Alter ego	First appearance	Creator	Description
Prowler	Aaron Davis	Ultimate Comics Spider-Man #1 (September 2011)	Brian Michael Bendis; Sara Pichelli	Aaron Davis is a burglar and career criminal known as the Prowler, in addition to being Miles Morales Uncle. In the Ultimate Comics he is the one to accidentally steal the spider that granted Miles his abilities. He features prominently in media adapting Miles Morales.

=== Miles Morales: Spider-Man debuts ===
Note: In chronological order

=== Villains in other media ===
Note: In chronological order

== Group villains ==
Cover of The Spectacular Spider-Man #246 (May 1997) depicting Spider-Man's weaker foes (Spot, Gibbon, the second Kangaroo and the third Grizzly) teaming up to try to defeat Spider-Man. Art by Luke Ross

Group name	Original members	First Appearance	Description
The Enforcers	Montana; Ox; Fancy Dan	The Amazing Spider-Man #10 (March 1964)	A team of mercenaries usually in the employment of crime bosses. They are generally depicted as having no super powers, but are highly skilled assassins.
Sinister Six	Doctor Octopus; Vulture; Electro; Sandman; Mysterio; Kraven the Hunter	The Amazing Spider-Man Annual #1 (January 1964)	Brought together by Doctor Octopus, they consist of some of Spider-Man's worst enemies, who joined forces in an attempt to eliminate the web-slinger once and for all. The team had different members in its various iterations over the years, but Doctor Octopus generally remained their leader across all versions.
Sinister Syndicate	Beetle; Hydro-Man; Rhino; Boomerang; Speed Demon	The Amazing Spider-Man #280 (September 1986)	A team of Spider-Man villains who were inspired by the Sinister Six to band together. Unlike them, however, they are not interested in killing Spider-Man, and work for the highest bidder.
Spider-Man Revenge Squad	Spot; Grizzly; Kangaroo; Gibbon	The Spectacular Spider-Man #246 (May 1997)	A team of lesser-known and weaker Spider-Man villains, also known as the Legion of Losers, who decided to join forces to stand a better chance against the web-slinger.
Inheritors	Solus; Unnamed Matriarch; Daemos; Verna; Karn; Morlun; Brix; Bora	The Superior Spider-Man #33 (November 2014)	A clan of totem hunters from Earth-001 who feed from animal, human and deity totems. Their main goal is to hunt down the various versions of Spider-Man across the Marvel Multiverse and feed on their life energy.

== Archenemies ==
Unlike most superheroes, who have a particular villain or villainous group among their adversaries with whom they have come into conflict the most (e.g., the Joker to Batman, and Lex Luthor to Superman in DC Comics; or Doctor Doom to the Fantastic Four, and the Brotherhood of Mutants to the X-Men in Marvel Comics etc.), Spider-Man is often regarded as having three archenemies, and it can be debated as to which one is the worst:

1. Doctor Octopus has been described as Spider-Man's greatest enemy, and the man Peter Parker might have become if he had not been raised with a sense of responsibility. He is infamous for defeating him the first time in battle and for almost marrying Peter's Aunt May. He is also the core leader of the Sinister Six, and at one point adopted the "Master Planner" alias. ("If This Be My Destiny...!") Later depictions revealed him in Peter Parker's body where he was the titular character for a while, ultimately becoming an antihero; on several occasions, he and Spider-Man have even put their differences aside to become allies.
2. The Norman Osborn version of the Green Goblin is most commonly regarded as Spider-Man's archenemy. Unlike Doctor Octopus, who only aims to kill Spider-Man, the Goblin also targeted his loved ones and showed no remorse in killing them as long as it caused pain to Spider-Man, therefore making him not only Spider-Man's worst enemy, but also Peter Parker's. His most infamous feat is killing Spider-Man's girlfriend in what became one of the most famous Spider-Man stories of all time and helped end the Silver Age of Comic Books and begin the Bronze Age of Comic Books. While the Goblin was killed in the same story, he returned in the 1990s to plague Spider-Man once again, committing more heinous acts (such as being involved of the murder of Aunt May). He also came into conflict with other heroes, such as the Avengers. Norman is sometimes depicted as an enemy of Spider-Man even when not being the Green Goblin.
3. The Eddie Brock incarnation of Venom is often regarded as Spider-Man's deadliest foe, and has been described as an evil mirror version of Spider-Man in many ways. He is also among Spider-Man's most popular villains. Venom's main goal is usually to ruin Peter Parker's life and mess with his head in any way he can. Despite this, Venom is not a traditional criminal, as he is only interested in hurting Spider-Man and does not engage in criminal acts, lacking the typical supervillain desires for wealth and power. The character also has a sense of honor and justice, and later starred in his own comic book stories, where he is depicted as an antihero and has a desire to protect innocent people from harm. On several occasions, he and Spider-Man have even put their differences aside to become allies.

== Reception ==
Reaction to Spider-Man's rogues gallery has been overwhelmingly positive with many journalists citing it as one of the greatest comic book rogues galleries of all time, with Batman's rogues gallery being its most rivaled contender. However, editors such as The Hollywood Reporter's Graeme McMillan felt that only the Flash's rogues gallery can compete with Spider-Man's rogues. Kyle Schmidlin of What Culture! described the superhero's rogues gallery as "one of the most colorful in comics" explaining that Batman could only be debated as having a great number of enemies as good as Spider-Man. IGN staff editors, Joshua Yehl and Jesse Schedeen, described the Spider-Man villains as "one of the most iconic and well-balanced in comics". They opined that the scope of their schemes, how cool their powers are, and how dramatically they have affected Spider-Man's life is what makes the Spider-Man villains so great. Newsarama ranked Spider-Man's rogues gallery as number one out of ten as the greatest rogues gallery of all time.

=== Themes ===
George Marston of Newsarama said that the reason he felt that Spider-Man's rogues gallery was the best was the thematic elements that the villains manifested. He explained that just like the superhero they have the same concept of science gone wrong. They are "like him, great men with great minds, great power, and great determination." But instead they fail to use their powers responsibly, symbolizing the thin line between being a hero and being a villain. Alex Wyse of Comic Book Resources felt that a good villain is supposed to challenge the ideals of the hero. For Spider-Man that idea was the famous quote "With great power comes great responsibility", where the superhero is pitted against an antithesis of the hero's motto like the concept of using superpowers for their personal gain.

== Me and the Boys ==
A viral Internet meme called "Me and the Boys", centering on images of Spider-Man foes from the 1960s Spider-Man animated series that showcases the four supervillains – the Green Goblin, Electro, Vulture and a photoshopped addition of Rhino – along with other Spider-Man foes in some variations, emerged in 2019. The meme image parodied and represented a group of friends bonding, hanging out, or engaging in various shenanigans. It originated from Reddit and, later, Twitter. It was placed as the 35th-best meme of 2019 by Thrillist.

== See also ==
- Savage Six: Antagonists of Spider-Girl and Agent Venom, similar to the Sinister Six.
- The Superior Foes of Spider-Man: A comic book series starring Spider-Man villains.
- List of X-Men enemies

== Notes ==
1. The Chameleon is the first member of Spider-Man's rogues gallery in publication date. (Excluding the Burglar.) He is also well known to be related to Kraven the Hunter and Kraven to him. That revealed relationship helped evolve him as a major villain compared to his original depiction of being just a solo villain in the original issue of The Amazing Spider-Man.
2. Besides being most notable as a Spider-Man supervillain, he has also been depicted as a Fantastic Four antagonist in Stan Lee and Jack Kirby comics books (mostly due to being introduced as the original Frightful Four). He was also a heroic figure (as an Avengers member) until being introduced as a tragic supervillain in the Spider-Man comics once again.
3. The character is also known as the member of the Frightful Four battling the Fantastic Four. He is also the first major Marvel villain to be written in publication history as battling Daredevil. Even being the founder and leader of the supervillain team that oppose him, the Emissaries of Evil.
4. Just like Electro, he has also been a major villain of Daredevil. In the storyline "Guardian Devil" he crossed into Daredevil's territory almost pushing Daredevil to the edge (just like he if often trying to do with Spider-Man) when Mysterio believes Spider-Man is a clone at one point.
5. While a recurring villain to Spider-Man since his introduction, Kraven the Hunter did not stand out as a memorable supervillain until the critically acclaimed storyline, "Kraven's Last Hunt".
6. Not counting any other character in the mainstream Marvel Universe with that name. Only outside of the mainstream Spider-Man comics or in other media is there other Spider-Man villains (that is not named Mac Gargan) that are antagonists of Spider-Man. Gargan is the third character to assume the Scorpion alias in comics, but he became the most notable one, and is only one to be a recurring adversary of Spider-Man.
7. While initially written to be a recurring villain of Spider-Man, Rhino has also come into conflict with other superheroes (especially Hulk). He is a major character in the storyline titled "Flowers for Rhino" (Spider-Man's Tangled Web), whose name is an homage to Flowers for Algernon.
8. Despite first appearing in Spider-Man comic books, the Kingpin is more notable of being Daredevil's archenemy. Despite this he is a major antagonist of both superheroes in the Marvel comic books just as recurringly. He also is a major recurring villain in the rest of the Marvel Universe crossing over as major antagonists to superheroes/antiheroes (such as the Punisher) in certain comic books of the many based universes of Marvel (PunisherMAX, etc.)
9. Morbius debuted in the storyline "The Six Arms Saga".
10. Miles Warren's first appearance was in The Amazing Spider-Man #31 (December 1965), but he did not become the Jackal until much later.
11. Although she is listed as a supervillain, the Black Cat is more often portrayed as an antiheroine and the major femme fatale romantic interest for Spider-Man. She is struggling to decide between good and bad, and the only thing preventing her from becoming a villain is her complicated relationship with Spider-Man. Nonetheless. she has been a staple supporting Spider-Man character during her debut.
12. The Amazing Spider-Man #299 is the first appearance of Eddie Brock as Venom. The alien costume debuted from The Amazing Spider-Man #252 and the symbiote bonded to Spider-Man in Secret Wars #8. Venom's creators are determined by pre-alien costume by not counting the creators/designers of the alien costume, David Michelinie or Mike Zeck, or the Marvel Comics fan who originally thought of the concept for the creators.
13. Cletus Kasady first appeared in The Amazing Spider-Man 344. Carnage is a major character in the popular storyline "Maximum Carnage".
14. Despite becoming an antihero with his own comic book storylines, the Punisher was first introduced as an adversary of Spider-Man.
15. Harry Osborn did not become the Green Goblin until The Amazing Spider-Man #136 (September 1974).
