= List of Spider-Slayers =

The original Spider-Slayer creator Spencer Smythe, alongside several of the Slayers.

The Spider-Slayers are a group of robots that appear in the American comic books published by Marvel Comics. Created by Stan Lee and Steve Ditko, the original Spider-Slayer first appeared in The Amazing Spider-Man #25 (June 1965). Primarily foes of Spider-Man, the first Spider-Slayer was built by scientist Spencer Smythe, who created several more of the robots to combat the hero up until his death. Afterwards, several other individuals built additional Spider-Slayers, including Spencer's son Alistair Smythe.

== Mark I ==
The very first Spider-Slayer battles Spider-Man. From Amazing Spider-Man #25 (June 1965), art by Steve Ditko

Appearing at the Daily Bugle, scientist Spencer Smythe offers his services to the newspaper's publisher, J. Jonah Jameson, claiming his Spider-Slayer can capture Spider-Man. At first dismissive of Smythe, Jameson is convinced to use the robot by Peter Parker (Spider-Man's civilian identity) who believes the Slayer can be easily defeated. Remotely controlling the Spider-Slayer, Jameson uses it to stalk Spider-Man throughout New York. The Spider-Slayer ensnares Spider-Man, but he frees himself by tampering with the Slayer's circuitry.

Several days after defeating the Slayer, Peter visits Smythe's laboratory, prompting the inert Slayer to spring to life and attack him. Before Smythe can deduce he is Spider-Man, Peter removes a jar of spiders from his pocket, claiming they were responsible for the robot attacking him. This fools Smythe, who deactivates the Slayer. When Molten Man trashes Smythe's laboratory, the Slayer activates again and attacks Peter, who cuts off the device's power supply before Smythe can regain consciousness.

Years later, the Slayer falls into the possession of the Reanimator, who adds it to his collection of machinery. The Reanimator activates the Spider-Slayer and has it attack Wolverine, who easily defeats it.

A replica of the Spider-Slayer is built by Alistair Smythe and destroyed by Spider-Man, who relives his first battle with the Slayer after being transported back in time.

J. Jonah Jameson reacquires the Slayer at some point, keeping it stored in his attic. During a dinner to get to know his new daughter-in-law, She-Hulk, various issues come to a head. Jameson snaps and has the Spider-Slayer attack She-Hulk, who destroys it.

The Mark I possesses a special chemical coating which stopped Spider-Man's webbing and clinging abilities from working against it. The Spider-Slayer could also scale vertical surfaces and it also possessed several tentacles and coils, which it could use to ensnare enemies. It was equipped with a special sensor device that homed in a target which possessed 'spider-impulses'. As a result, it will chase and ensnare anything and anyone with the greatest amount of these characteristics (which, in most cases, is Spider-Man).

== Mark II ==
The Mark II is similar to its predecessor, possessing similar abilities but a more humanoid appearance. Used by Jameson at first, Smythe later takes control of the machine, intending to kill Spider-Man. The second Slayer is destroyed when Spider-Man lures it into Smythe's lab, causing the machine's sensors to overload to the point that it shut down.

Alistair Smythe later either reactivated, or built a replica of, the second Slayer to use against Spider-Man, who destroyed it.

== Mark III ==
The last of Smythe's Slayers to be used by J. Jonah Jameson, the Mark III resembles a large mechanical spider. After tracking down Spider-Man, the Slayer fights him and, at first, is no match for the hero until Smythe takes control of the robot from Jameson. Knocking Spider-Man out, the Slayer leaves and is used by Smythe to steal lab equipment.

Another Mark III is used by Alistair Smythe and destroyed by Spider-Man, along with the rest of Alistair's revived Spider-Slayers.

This Spider-Slayer possesses a web-shooter resembling Spider-Man, as well as a large retractable blade. Like previous Spider-Slayers, it is covered in a non-stick coating, meaning Spider-Man could not use his webbing effectively against it.

== Mark IV ==
A gigantic version of the Mark III, this Slayer is piloted by Smythe from the inside. The Mark IV captures Spider-Man by ensnaring him in a web, but he escapes and shuts the Spider-Slayer down by clogging its web-shooters.

The Mark IV later ambushes Spider-Man, who is weakened from previous battles and his doubts over whether he is himself or his clone. When ensnared by the Slayer, Spider-Man realizes - given that he instinctively thought of Mary Jane Watson while the clone would still love Gwen Stacy - that he is the real one, and manages to escape and smash open the Slayer's cockpit, knocking Smythe out.

The Mark IV is later rebuilt by Alistair Smythe and used against Spider-Man, who destroys it along with the rest of Alistair's Spider-Slayer army.

Possessing the same abilities as the Mark III, except on a larger scale, the Mark IV could also emit disorienting ethyl chloride spray.

== Mark V ==
The Mark V Spider-Slayer (left) battles Spider-Man. From Amazing Spider-Man #167 (April 1977), art by John Romita Sr.

The Mark V was created by Marla Madison and J. Jonah Jameson. Tracking down Spider-Man, the Slayer engages him in battle, as well as Will o' the Wisp, who was at the scene at the time. The Slayer is destroyed when Spider-Man crushes it with a statue of Prometheus.

Following the original Mark V Slayer's destruction, several copies of it appear, being used by the Reanimator and Dracula.

Unlike previous Spider-Slayers, the Mark V is controlled through mental commands transmitted through a special helmet, giving it better reaction time than previous Slayers. The Mark V also possesses super-strength, a web-shooter, and a laser cannon.

== Mark VI ==
Used by a dying Spencer Smythe, the Mark VI proves to be his most powerful creation. Battling Spider-Man atop the Empire State Building, the Slayer proves to be more than a match for Spider-Man. Spider-Man knocks the Slayer off the Empire State Building, causing it to be destroyed after hitting the ground.

Another Mark VI is a part of Alistair Smythe's Spider-Slayer army; unlike the original, this new one proved to be pathetic in comparison, being easily destroyed by Spider-Man.

The Mark VI possesses a large amount of weaponry and abilities; it had a web cannon, laser guns, metallic coils, and the ability to stick to surfaces. It is made of a durable metal which renders it almost immune to physical damage. Like the Mark V, the Mark VI can be controlled mentally.

== Mark VII ==
The Mark VII is created by Spencer Smythe's son, Alistair Smythe, and resembles a ship. Using the Mark VII to kidnap May Parker and Anna Watson, Smythe attempts to kill Mary Jane Watson, who he believed to be Spider-Man. Engaging the Slayer in battle, Spider-Man attempts to short-circuit the ship by causing it to crash into a water tower. When this fails, Spider-Man entangles the ship in power-lines, which causes it to short-circuit.

An unmanned version of the Mark VII appears as a part of Alistair's Spider-Slayer army. This new Mark VII is destroyed by Spider-Man, along with the rest of Alistair's Slayers.

Piloted from the inside, the Mark VII possessed several weapons, which included extendable claws, electric whips, and laser cannons. Unlike previous Spider-Slayers, the Mark VII was shown to be capable of flight.

== Mark VIII ==
A gigantic robot, the Mark VIII is operated by the now-crippled Alistair Smythe. Alistair tracks down Spider-Man, but is forced to retreat after a construction worker damages the Slayer with a bulldozer. After repairing the Slayer, Alistair tracks down Spider-Man once more and nearly kills him before Spider-Man rips apart the Slayer and tears Alistair out of the cockpit.

Alistair later rebuilds the Mark VIII and uses it as a soldier in his Spider-Slayer army, which is destroyed by Spider-Man.

The Mark VIII was extremely powerful, seen capable of tearing apart steel. The Slayer also had extendable limbs and could shoot ethyl chloride from its fingers. Its head could fire off a powerful energy beam.

== Mark IX (Ultimate Spider-Slayer) ==
The Mark IX is Alistair Smythe himself, having gained superpowers through self-inflicted mutations and cybernetic implants.

== Mark X ==
An alien-like robot, the Mark X was the first Spider-Slayer to attack Spider-Man in the "Invasion of the Spider-Slayers" storyline. Attacking Spider-Man while he was swinging through town, the Mark X nearly kills Spider-Man until a construction worker decapitates it with a jackhammer.

Alistair Smythe later rebuilds the Mark X to be used in his Spider-Slayer army, which is destroyed by Spider-Man.

The Mark X was extremely fast and agile and had a large amount of spikes and claws protruding from its body.

== Mark XI ==
A giant robotic bird, the Mark XI attacks Central Park while Peter Parker is there with Life Model Decoy versions of his parents, Richard and Mary Parker. The Mark XI is easily defeated when Spider-Man smashes its head in.

The Spider-Slayer Mark XI is later rebuilt by Alistair Smythe, who uses it as a soldier in his Spider-Slayer army, which Spider-Man destroys.

The Mark XI, along with being able to fly, was capable of shooting electricity from its mouth. It also had retractable, bladed tentacles on its back.

== Mark XII ==
A large, imposing humanoid Spider-Slayer resembling Iron Man, Mark XII attacks Spider-Man while he was in the middle of a battle with Electro. After a long fight, Spider-Man destroys the Spider-Slayer by trapping it in a building that is set to be demolished. The building collapses before the Mark XII can escape.

The Mark XII was rebuilt by Alistair Smythe to be used in his Spider-Slayer army, only to be destroyed by Spider-Man again.

The Mark XII was capable of flight, possessed super-strength and could also fire lasers from both its head and its arm, the latter of which was a laser-cannon.

== Mark XIII ==
The Mark XIII was created by Alistair's assistant Max Young and resembles Mendel Stromm's Amoeboid robot. It attacks Spider-Man and Black Cat while they are battling the Scorpion. The Mark XIII ensnares Spider-Man in its tentacles and begins to suffocate him, but is destroyed after Scorpion accidentally impales it.

Alistair Smythe later rebuilds the Mark XIII to be used in his Spider-Slayer army, which is destroyed by Spider-Man.

The Mark XIII was capable of stretching its body to extreme lengths and could also entrap enemies within itself, suffocating them. Its body was also extremely malleable, allowing it to twist and warp its shape.

== Mark XIV ==
A robot designed by Max Young, but built by Alistair Smythe, the Mark XIV possesses artificial intelligence and three personalities, modeled after aspects of Young. Attacking Spider-Man and Black Cat at a prison, the Mark XIV initially has the upper hand until Spider-Man turns its personalities against each other, causing it to destroy itself.

Another Mark XIV, this one lacking a mind, is created by Alistair to be a soldier in his Spider-Slayer army and is destroyed by Spider-Man.

The Mark XIV could fly through the use of a jetpack, could shoot energy beams out of its fingers, and possessed super-strength. It also had several hook-ended tentacles.

=== Mark XIV in other media ===
A version of the armor, named the Megaslayer, appears in Spider-Man: The Animated Series.

== Mark XV, XVI, and XVII ==
The Mark XV, XVI, and XVII Spider-Slayers respectively resemble a robotic black widow, tarantula, and scorpion. The three attack Spider-Man and Black Cat and are presumed destroyed after falling off a building. Revealed to have survived the fall, the Spider-Slayers combine to create one giant robot. The combined Spider-Slayer is destroyed when Spider-Man jams a live cable into its circuitry.

Recreated versions of the Spider-Slayers appear as part of Alistair Smythe's Spider-Slayer army. Along with the rest of the Slayer army, the Mark XV is destroyed by Spider-Man.

The Mark XV had razor sharp legs and it could also spin webs and stick to surfaces.

=== Mark XV, XVI, and XVII in other media ===
Spider-Slayers based on the Mark XV through XVII called the Black Widow, Tarantula, and Scorpion appear in Spider-Man: The Animated Series. In the episode "The Spider-Slayer", Spencer Smythe and Norman Osborn build the Black Widow to hunt down Spider-Man, who destroys it. In the episode "Return of the Spider-Slayers", Alistair works for the Kingpin to recreate a second version of the Black Widow alongside two other Spider-Slayers which are able to combine.

== Mark XVIII ==
A member of Alistair Smythe's army of Spider-Slayers, the Mark XVIII was humanoid with six arms. Attempting to attack May Parker's house, the Mark XVIII Spider-Slayer was tied up with webbing and subsequently destroyed by Spider-Man.

The Mark XVIII possessed super-strength; it could also stick to surfaces and fire energy beams from its head and hands.

== Mark XIX ==
The Spider-Slayer Mark XIX was seen in the Secret War crossover. The person who built this Spider-Slayer is unknown, but it is possible it was either Lucia von Bardas or the Tinkerer. Aiding dozens of supervillains in combat during the Secret War, the status of the Mark XIX is currently unknown.

The full extent of the Mark XIX's powers is unknown; so far the only powers it was shown utilizing were the abilities to shoot laser beams and spit acid.

== Other versions ==
=== Anti-Spider Squad ===
After Jameson becomes mayor of New York, he creates the Anti-Spider Squad, recycling the parts of several old Spider-Slayers to better equip them. At first enemies of Spider-Man, the Anti-Spider Squad, after aiding Spider-Man in foiling a plot of the Chameleon's, realizes that Jameson's hatred of Spider-Man is unfounded and leave his service.

=== Cyber-Slayers ===
At the behest of mobster Jason Tso, Alistair Smythe creates the Cyber-Slayers, intent on selling them on the black market. Attaining most of the components needed to create the Cyber-Slayers, Alistair and Tso use them in a test run against rival gang leader Lady Octopus. Alistair battles Lady Octopus and her gang when they attempt to steal the Cyber-Slayer's components, only to be betrayed by Tso, who seeks to profit from the Cyber-Slayers alone.

The Cyber-Slayers were super-powerful, were capable of shooting lasers, and had several spikes protruding from their bodies.

=== Mini-Slayers ===
The Mini-Slayers are small spider-like robots used by Alistair Smythe to spy on Spider-Man. Individually, Mini-Slayers are weak, though they can be a nuisance in large numbers.

Alistair sends hundreds of Mini-Slayers to aid the Scorpion in his attempt to kill J. Jonah Jameson. While battling Spider-Man and the She-Hulk, the Mini-Slayers combined to make a blob-like entity, which is destroyed. Alistair later uses a Mini-Slayer to poison John Jameson, causing him to again become the Man-Wolf.

The Mini-Slayers are capable of sensing Spider-Man's location and adhering to surfaces. They can also combine with each other to form a larger, more powerful robot.

=== Villains ===
Three robots in the forms of the Vulture, the Sandman and the Kingpin were sent by Spencer Smythe to weaken and psychologically disorientate Spider-Man. When each robot is defeated, they release acid that dissolves their remains, leaving no trace of their presence. After all three robots are defeated, Smythe attacks Spider-Man in the Mark IV Spider-Slayer.

Each of the three robots had weakened versions of the powers of the villain they were based on. They also possessed super-strength.

=== Refitted Octobots - Spider-Man's Spider Slayers ===
During the "Spider-Island" storyline, Spider-Man refits Doctor Octopus's confiscated Octobots to cure the population of New York, who were transformed into humanoid spiders. He humorously dubs the devices "Spider-Slayers". During the "Dying Wish" storyline, Doctor Octopus uses one of the Octobots to transfer his consciousness into Spider-Man's body.
