= Molten Man =

Fictional character

- Molten Man as he appeared on a pin-up of The Amazing Spider-Man Annual #13 (August 1979). Art by Keith Pollard.

Publication information
- Publisher: Marvel Comics
- First appearance: The Amazing Spider-Man #28 (September 1965)
- Created by: Stan Lee (writer); Steve Ditko (artist)

In-story information
- Alter ego: Mark Raxton
- Species: Human (currently); Human mutate (formerly)
- Team affiliations: The Exterminators; Alchemax
- Notable aliases: Burning Man
- Abilities: Genius-level intellect; Organic metal skin grants: Superhuman strength, stamina, and durability; Tactile thermokinesis; Pyrokinesis

Molten Man (Mark Raxton) is a fictional character appearing in American comic books published by Marvel Comics. Created by writer Stan Lee and artist Steve Ditko, the character first appeared in The Amazing Spider-Man #28 (September 1965).

Mark Raxton is a former chemical engineer who sought to use his talents for self-gain, and the stepbrother of Liz Allan. He becomes caught in a lab accident that sees his body be covered by an experimental liquid metallic alloy, which turns his skin gold and enables him to generate extreme heat and radiation at will. Raxton initially uses his newfound powers to commit crimes as the supervillain Molten Man and becomes a recurring enemy of Spider-Man. Later storylines would establish the character's nuanced morality and desire to cure himself of his condition. With the help of his stepsister Liz, he eventually finds redemption and is cured, allowing him to lead a normal life again.

The character has appeared in several media adaptations outside of comics, most notably The Spectacular Spider-Man animated series, in which he was reimagined as Liz Allan's biological, teenage brother and was voiced by Eric Lopez. Additionally, an illusionary creature based on Molten Man appeared in the Marvel Cinematic Universe (MCU) film Spider-Man: Far From Home (2019).

== Publication history ==
Molten Man was created by Stan Lee and Steve Ditko and first appeared in The Amazing Spider-Man #28 (September 1965).

== Fictional character biography ==
Mark Raxton was born in New York City. He was a scientist who could not wait to use his skills to become rich and once worked at Oscorp Industries as the laboratory assistant to Spencer Smythe, creator of the Spider-Slayers. Raxton and Smythe developed an experimental new liquid metallic alloy for the Spider-Slayers from a radioactive meteor, but Raxton in his greed and impatience, attempted to steal it and sell it, ignoring Smythe's protests that it needed further testing. In the ensuing fight with Smythe in the laboratory, Raxton spilled the liquid alloy on himself, turning his skin gold. Fearing for his life, Raxton ran for the nearest hospital, only to discover that the alloy had changed him for the better when he angrily punched an irate motorist's hood, buckling it. Realizing the great potential his new abilities afforded him, Raxton, calling himself the Molten Man, turned to crime to further his monetary gains. Peter Parker, as Spider-Man, nearly missed his high school graduation to stop Molten Man's first crime spree. Raxton was later released from jail, only to continue his criminal activities. However, he was once again defeated by Spider-Man.

In his third encounter with Spider-Man, it was revealed that Peter's friend Liz Allan was Raxton's stepsister, and the Molten Man's metallic skin had begun to give off intense heat and consume itself. He steals meteor fragments from a museum to attempt a cure. An encounter with Spider-Man resulted in his submergence in the polluted East River, which temporarily reversed the deterioration.

In another encounter, Raxton broke into a pharmaceutical company to steal chemicals which would reverse his condition permanently. When the procedure failed, he went berserk and demanded to speak to Liz, who agreed to talk to him and also tried to convince him to surrender. Liz was saved by Spider-Man and the Molten Man became buried beneath the laboratory. He later resurfaced at the same site and once again sought his stepsister. Spider-Man prevented the Molten Man from hurting her, knocking him into a swimming pool which extinguished Molten Man's flames and cooled his skin. He was then taken to the Vault, a prison for superhuman criminals.

Raxton realized that his stepsister was the only member of his family who had not abandoned him. He was eventually released from the Vault and approached Liz to apologize. Spider-Man misunderstood his intentions and battled him once more. Reconciled with Raxton, Liz and her husband Harry Osborn gave Raxton a job as head of security at Osborn Industries. The Molten Man later teamed up with Spider-Man and the second Green Goblin against Tombstone and Hammerhead. The Molten Man was then kidnapped along with Liz, Normie Osborn and Spider-Man by Harry Osborn, who had suffered a mental relapse, making him the Green Goblin once again. The Molten Man was saved by Spider-Man. Molten Man and Spider-Man have since become friends, and the Molten Man has occasionally used his powers to aid Spider-Man against other supervillains. A few times he has been a bodyguard for Peter Parker's friends and family when disasters overwhelm the city.

In the months following the Clone Saga, Raxton was abducted by Norman Osborn, the Green Goblin, and brainwashed. Under mind control, the Molten Man attacked and killed Osborn's henchman Alison Mongrain, the only person who knew of the location of Peter and Mary Jane's baby. Although the Molten Man has since recovered from the mind control, he still bears a heavy burden of guilt over the incident.

Sometime after Harry Osborn's death, Raxton is summoned when mysterious forces kidnap Liz Allan's son, Normie Osborn. The Molten Man uses his brawn and brains to help Spider-Man and the Daily Bugle reporter Ben Urich uncover what happened. Raxton is later pressed into a supervillain group again when the Chameleon approaches him and threatens to kill Normie if Raxton does not join his 'Exterminators'. Raxton is consequently forced to attack Liz Allan.

During the Civil War storyline, the Molten Man and the Scarecrow are used as bait for Captain America's Secret Avengers, only for the Punisher to arrive. Raxton is left in critical condition after being attacked by the Punisher.

Raxton next appears, still in poor condition, under the care of Liz Allan. When Harry Osborn comes to visit Liz and Normie, he and Liz argue. Hearing Liz speak Harry's name, Raxton awakens and attacks him, screaming that Harry has hurt his family for the last time and will "die for real". Spider-Man intervenes, but he has trouble fighting Raxton, whose powers have grown out of control. Spider-Man manages to trap Raxton in asphalt, and Harry provides him with a cure that Oscorp had been working on upon using volunteer Charlie Weiderman, the other "Molten Man" who destroyed Peter's house at the same day Spider-Man joined the New Avengers prior to Civil War. The cure is successful, returning Raxton to his human form while retaining his powers. Harry builds Raxton a special suit, using a part of the alloy and his DNA, to help him control his powers.

Liz Allan later becomes the head of Alchemax and uses its technology to completely cure Raxton, removing his powers. He is constantly monitored, but is no longer considered a threat to society and joins Alchemax's security force.

== Powers and abilities ==
Originally, Mark Raxton was given unnatural powers after his exposure to an experimental liquid metal alloy obtained from a meteor discovered by Spencer Smythe. His body completely absorbed its organic properties, turning his external tissues into a solid metallic substance. As a result, the Molten Man possesses superior strength and high resistance to physical injury. His skin is composed of a frictionless metal that causes things to slip off, including Spider-Man's webbing. Raxton's metallic fingers are sensitive enough to pick locks (making him an expert safe cracker). He can generate intense flames, incinerating anybody who tries to touch him or shooting fire-like blasts at his foes. At one time, his body became molten lava, allowing him to project radiation and heat up to 300 °F (149 °C). In this form, the Molten Man's metallic skin would reach a critical stage and eventually dissolve.

Additionally, Raxton is a college graduate with a Bachelor of Science degree in chemical engineering.

== Other versions ==
An alternate universe variant of Mark Raxton from Earth-1610 appears in the Ultimate Marvel universe. This version is a guitarist in the punk rock band Molten Man.

== In other media ==
=== Television ===
The Molten Man as he appears in The Spectacular Spider-Man

- Molten Man, renamed Mark Allan, appears in The Spectacular Spider-Man, voiced by Eric Lopez. This version is Liz Allan's biological brother and a student at Midtown High School who previously served time in juvenile detention for stealing a car to pay off gambling debts. Seeing no other way to pay off his debts, Mark becomes a test subject for the Green Goblin's experiments and is given metallic skin and pyrokinetic abilities. The Goblin then manipulates Mark into fighting Spider-Man, though he is ultimately defeated and remanded to the Vault.
- Molten Man appears in Ultimate Spider-Man, voiced by James Arnold Taylor.
- Molten Man appears in the Spider-Man (2017) episode "Brand New Day", voiced by Imari Williams. This version is a mutant volcanic creature, crime boss, and rival of Mister Negative.

=== Film ===
A member of the Elementals inspired by Molten Man appears in Spider-Man: Far From Home. Director Jon Watts described his take for the creation: "There's so many Spider-Man villains from the rogues gallery that I wanted to dig a little bit deeper than what anyone might be expecting...villains like Hydro-Man and Molten Man, who may not be on the highest list. But that opened up such amazing visual possibilities and poses really dangerous challenges for Spider-Man". Identified as the Fire Elemental, Mysterio claimed it used its abilities to feed off of metal and energy from Earth's core to destroy his Earth. The Fire Elemental attacks Prague during the Signal Festival, though Spider-Man and Mysterio defeat it. Not long after, Spider-Man discovers that the Elementals were illusions created by Mysterio and his fellow ex-Stark Industries employees to obtain Tony Stark's technology and fraudulently establish Mysterio as a hero.

=== Video games ===
Molten Man appears as a non-player character and boss in Marvel: Ultimate Alliance 2.
