= Liz Allan =

Marvel Comics fictional character

- Liz Allan, as she appeared on a panel of Sensational Spider-Man #40 (October 2007). Art by Clayton Crain.

Publication information
- Publisher: Marvel Comics
- First appearance: Anonymous cameo: Amazing Fantasy #15 (August 1962); As Liz Allan: The Amazing Spider-Man #4 (September 1963)
- Created by: Stan Lee (writer); Steve Ditko (artist)

In-story information
- Full name: Elizabeth Allan
- Team affiliations: Alchemax
- Supporting character of: Harry Osborn (husband); Normie Osborn (son); Spider-Man; Daredevil; Venom
- Notable aliases: Misery
- Abilities: Alien symbiote grants: Superhuman strength, speed, agility, and durability; Ability to cling to most surfaces; Organic webbing; Limited shapeshifting and camouflage; Symbiote's autonomous defense capabilities; Undetectable by Spider-Man's spider-sense

Elizabeth "Liz" Allan, later known by her married name Elizabeth Allan-Osborn and commonly misspelled as "Liz Allen", is a character appearing in American comic books published by Marvel Comics. The character was created by Stan Lee and Steve Ditko and made her first named appearance in The Amazing Spider-Man #4 (September 1963). In her earliest appearances, Liz was a popular girl at the high school Peter Parker attends. She has been a regular supporting character in the various Spider-Man, Daredevil, and Venom series on an on-and-off basis, and has ties to the Green Goblin and Molten Man. She eventually marries Harry Osborn and becomes the mother of their son, Normie Osborn, and the CEO of Alchemax. Liz later becomes Misery after bonding to portions of the Anti-Venom and Carnage symbiotes.

Sally Livingstone portrayed Liz Allan in Sam Raimi's Spider-Man (2002), while Laura Harrier portrayed the character in the Marvel Cinematic Universe (MCU) films Spider-Man: Homecoming (2017) and Spider-Man: No Way Home (2021).

== Publication history ==
Liz Allan is named in The Amazing Spider-Man #4 (September 1963), the same issue in which Betty Brant first appears. However, an unnamed blonde female high school student in Amazing Fantasy #15 (August 1962) appears to be Liz Allan, and The Marvel Encyclopedia lists this as her official first appearance. She was a supporting character in the series until Amazing Spider-Man #28 (September 1965), which bids farewell to Liz as both she and Spider-Man graduate from high school.

Nearly a decade later, Liz Allan was brought back in a story arc in Amazing Spider-Man #132–133 (May – June 1974), in which it is revealed that she is the Molten Man's stepsister. Writer Gerry Conway recalled, "I liked doing callbacks to the run I was most influenced by, the original Stan Lee/Steve Ditko era, so bringing Liz back was something I'd wanted to do for a long time. And it gave me a reason to go back and look through the issues she was in, which brought me to the Molten Man's first appearance."

== Fictional character biography ==
Liz Allan is introduced as a popular student at Midtown High School and a minor love interest of Peter Parker and Flash Thompson. Peter likes Liz, but she is Flash's girlfriend and considers Peter something of a loser, even taking part in the general ridicule that Peter endures on a daily basis. Her earliest appearances depict her as flighty and rather thoughtless – not outright cruel, but lacking the empathy necessary to perceive Peter's nature.

However, after she hears an ailing Peter had donned a Spider-Man costume to save Betty Brant from Doctor Octopus, she develops a crush on him. By this time, however, Peter's interest has waned considerably, as he notes that Liz never showed any real interest in him until he began dating Betty Brant, and assumes that Liz's feelings are little more than a schoolgirl crush. Betty and Liz clash several times over Peter, as Betty mistakenly thinks that Peter reciprocates Liz's interest in him.

In Amazing Spider-Man #28 (September 1965), Peter and Liz graduate from high school. At the graduation ceremony, Liz admits her feelings to Peter, and says she accepts the fact that her feelings are unrequited. In the same issue, Spider-Man battles the Molten Man, who in later issues is revealed to be Liz's stepbrother, Mark Raxton.

She does not appear for a few years, during which time Peter developed relationships with Gwen Stacy and Mary Jane Watson. When Liz returns, she dates then marries Harry Osborn, whom she meets at Betty Brant's wedding to Ned Leeds, becoming Liz Allan Osborn. The couple have a son, Normie Osborn. Their family history turns tragic, however, after Harry Osborn has a mental breakdown. In the guise of the Green Goblin, Harry kidnaps Liz, Normie, and Mark, and terrorizes them within an old family mansion. Liz is deeply traumatized by this experience and falls into a state of denial about her husband's problems. Harry's madness leads to his death shortly after. Struggling to put Harry behind her, Liz breaks ties with Peter and Mary Jane.

Liz Allan becomes a supporting character in the series Daredevil, serving as a love interest for lawyer Foggy Nelson. The couple breaks up after Mysterio manipulates Foggy into having an affair in a plot to drive Daredevil insane. Liz feels like Foggy has let her down and ends their relationship.

After Spider-Man publicly reveals his real identity in the "Civil War" storyline, Liz becomes resentful of him, blaming Peter for bringing so much death into their lives. However, after the events of the "One More Day" storyline, the public revelation of Peter's identity has been forgotten and Harry is seemingly still alive, but he and Liz are no longer married.

Liz and Normie are present when Molten Man is given an antidote to his condition. Mark Raxton, who had escaped the basement in which Liz was keeping him for his own safety, is cured thanks to Oscorp. Liz is last seen attending a party to help Flash Thompson deal with the loss of his legs.

Liz Allan forms a new alliance with Norman Osborn as he attempts to re-establish himself as a corporate figure – apparently using an alias as his activities as the Green Goblin have made his true name too public, working with him to ensure her son's future. Following a confrontation between Spider-Man 2099 and an agent of a time-travel organization from 2211 in the Alchemax Building, Liz has deduced that the 'new' Spider-Man must work in the company and is determined to enlist him to her cause, foreshadowing the time-traveler's claims that Liz Allan and Spider-Man 2099 will have some significant impact on future history.

During the Cult of Carnage arc, Liz bonds with portions of the Anti-Venom and Carnage symbiotes, transforming her into Misery. She helps battle the Zombiotes during the "Venom War", using her Anti-Venom abilities to kill them.

== Powers and abilities ==
When possessed by the Misery symbiote, Liz Allan has the powers and weaknesses of the symbiote.

== Other versions ==
=== Amazing Spider-Man: Renew Your Vows ===
An alternate universe version of Liz Allan appears in Amazing Spider-Man: Renew Your Vows. This version divorced Harry Osborn sometime before his death and is in charge of Allan Biotech.

=== MC2 ===
An alternate universe version of Liz Allan appears in MC2. This version married Foggy Nelson after the death of Harry Osborn. She later dies from an unspecified illness, leading her son Normie to become the Green Goblin.

=== Spider-Man Loves Mary Jane ===
In Spider-Man Loves Mary Jane, Liz Allan is Mary Jane Watson's best friend. Liz is a cheerleader and has recently reconciled with her boyfriend Flash Thompson after breaking up with him because he declared that he loved Mary Jane at homecoming.

=== Ultimate Marvel ===
An alternate universe version of Liz Allan appears in the Ultimate Marvel universe. This version is a pyrokinetic mutant, the estranged daughter of the Blob, and a member of the X-Men as Firestar.

=== Ultimate Universe ===
An alternate universe version of Liz Allan appears in Ultimate Invasion.

== In other media ==
=== Television ===
Liz Allan as seen in The Spectacular Spider-Man.

- Liz Allan appears in Spider-Man: The Animated Series, voiced by Marla Rubinoff. This version is a friend and confidant of Mary Jane Watson who is attracted to Harry Osborn.
- Liz Allan appears in The Spectacular Spider-Man, voiced by Alanna Ubach. This version is of Hispanic descent and a friend of Sally Avril. At the beginning of the series, she is dating Flash Thompson, but shows interest in Peter Parker after he begins tutoring her. She also starts to express regret after Flash and the popular clique reject Peter. After spending time with Peter at Coney Island in the episode "Reaction", she breaks up with Flash and becomes openly complimentary towards Peter. In the episode "Shear Strength", she reveals her feelings to Peter and kisses him. In the following episode, Peter and Liz begin dating, but his activities as Spider-Man and feelings for Gwen Stacy complicate their relationship. In "Final Curtain", Peter breaks up with Liz to be with Gwen, leaving her angry and heartbroken, though to save face in front of her peers, she makes it appear as if it was the other way around.
- Liz Allan appears in Spider-Man (2017), voiced by Natalie Lander. This version is a student and class president at Midtown High School. In the episode "Screwball Live", she takes the alias of Screwball to pull pranks on corrupt businessmen and posts her actions online, drawing the attention of Spider-Man, Hammerhead, and Absorbing Man. After Spider-Man defeats the villains, Liz retires the Screwball identity.

=== Film ===
- Liz Allan appears in the original script for Cannon's aborted Spider-Man film, written by Ted Newsom and John Brancato, as Peter Parker's love interest.
- An unidentified character who appears in Spider-Man (2002), portrayed by Sally Livingstone, is identified as Liz Allan in the film's novelization.
- Liz Allan (née Toomes) appears in the Marvel Cinematic Universe (MCU) film Spider-Man: Homecoming (2017), portrayed by Laura Harrier. This version is a senior student at Midtown Science High School, the daughter of criminal Adrian Toomes, the leader of the school's decathlon team, and Peter Parker's crush. Over the course of the film, she becomes a fan of and develops a crush on Spider-Man before developing a romantic interest in Peter, but remains unaware that they are the same person. After Toomes is arrested, Liz and her mother move to Oregon on his wishes.
- A picture of Allan appears in Spider-Man: No Way Home (2021), portrayed again by Laura Harrier. After Peter's identity is publicly exposed, she becomes the subject of several magazine articles where she discusses her past relationship with him. She also appears in the post-credits scene of the extended cut via archive footage from Spider-Man: Homecoming.

=== Video games ===
- The Ultimate Marvel incarnation of Liz Allan appears in Ultimate Spider-Man.
- Liz Allan appears in Marvel's Avengers, voiced by Elizabeth Grullon.
- Liz Allan / Misery appears in Marvel Snap.
