= Green Goblin (Bart Hamilton) =

Bart Hamilton Green Goblin

Publication information
- Publisher: Marvel Comics
- First appearance: The Amazing Spider-Man #176 (January 1978)

In-story information
- Full name: Dr. Barton "Bart" Hamilton
- Notable aliases: Green Goblin
- Abilities: Superhuman strength, intellect, stamina, durability, agility and reflexes due to ingesting the "Goblin Serum"; Regenerative healing factor; Uses goblin-themed weapons and a "Goblin Glider" which has a variety of offensive weapons as paraphernalia

Green Goblin (Bart Hamilton) is a supervillain appearing in American comic books published by Marvel Comics. The character was depicted as the third Green Goblin, and first appeared in Amazing Spider-Man #167 (April 1977). He became the Green Goblin in #176.

== Fictional character biography ==
Bart Hamilton is a doctor who is tasked with treating a mentally disturbed Harry Osborn, who had been captured after some time acting as the Green Goblin. Under hypnosis, Osborn tells Hamilton everything about the Goblin, as well as Spider-Man's secret identity. Hamilton is skeptical about these stories, but finds them to be true. After curing Osborn of his insanity, and temporarily making him forget his time as the Green Goblin, Hamilton investigates the old headquarters of the Green Goblin. After being exposed to the same chemical formula that Norman Osborn and Harry Osborn used in the past, Hamilton becomes the third Green Goblin. After a brief stint trying to rule the criminal underworld, Hamilton accidentally kills himself in an explosion during a fight with Harry Osborn and Spider-Man.
