= The Amazing Spider-Man 2 (2014 video game) =

2014 video game

- Developers: Beenox; High Voltage Software (3DS); Gameloft (Windows Phone/Android/iOS)
- Publisher: Activision
- Director: Thomas Wilson
- Producer: Stephane Gravel
- Writer: Christos Gage
- Composer: Samuel Laflamme
- Series: Spider-Man
- Platform: List: Android; iOS; Windows Phone; Windows; Nintendo 3DS; PlayStation 3; PlayStation 4; Wii U; Xbox 360; Xbox One
- Release: Android, iOS, Windows Phone: WW: April 17, 2014; Windows, 3DS, PS3, PS4, Wii U, X360: NA: April 29, 2014; EU: May 2, 2014; AU: May 7, 2014; Xbox One: NA: May 12, 2014; EU: May 4, 2014; AU: May 7, 2014
- Genre: Action-adventure
- Mode: Single-player

The Amazing Spider-Man 2 is a 2014 action-adventure video game based on the Marvel Comics character Spider-Man and the 2014 film of the same name. Developed by Beenox, it is the sequel to 2012's The Amazing Spider-Man, itself based on the 2012 film of the same name. and takes place within the same continuity, different from that of the films. The game's plot expands upon that of the film by including additional characters and elements from the Spider-Man comic books and other aspects of the Marvel Universe.

The game was released on April 29 in North America and May 2 in Europe for the Microsoft Windows, Nintendo 3DS, PlayStation 3, PlayStation 4, Wii U, and Xbox 360 platforms, to generally mixed reviews, with criticism particularly aimed at the plot, writing, repetitive combat and the Hero-Menace morality system. The Xbox One version was released alongside the other platforms digitally while the release of physical copies was delayed by two weeks. Gameloft also released a mobile version on April 17 for iOS, Android and Windows Phone devices as a paid game. The game was also localized in Japan by Square Enix as a PlayStation-exclusive title.

== Gameplay ==
The Amazing Spider-Man 2 is a third person action-adventure video game, set in an open world based on Manhattan. Players take on the role of Spider-Man and complete missions—linear scenarios with set objectives—to progress through the story. The missions are structured in a linear manner, but the player is free to explore the game's map in between missions and engage in various side activities. Players have access to all of Spider-Man's superhuman abilities, including web swinging and wall crawling. The Web-Rush bullet time mechanic from the game's predecessor also returns and has been expanded, now allowing players to also do critical strikes, dodges, and rolls. The combat is similar to the predecessor, featuring a free flow design and counterattacks, and allows Spider-Man to incapacitate enemies for a few seconds by various means, such as throwing interactable objects at them, and then subdue them for good by webbing them.

Players are able to upgrade Spider-Man's web shooters and unlock new abilities, such as ionic webbing, which destroys metal objects, including the armors of certain enemies, or vibro blasts that incapacitate enemies for a few seconds. In addition to the armored enemies, more enemy types have been introduced, such as Brutes, which can be defeated only after weakening them with vibro blasts, and Speeders and Glider riders, which can be attacked only after pulling them towards Spider-Man. Save for the Brutes, all of these enemies can be easily taken down during stealth segments, just like normal enemies.

The game's side missions include stopping petty crimes, car chases, and gun fights in the streets, throwing bombs into the ocean, transporting injured civilians to the hospital, and saving people from a burning building, these side missions are random and are regenerated. The game introduces a new morality system known as the Hero and Menace System, where completing these side missions will increase Spider-Man's reputation and cause him to be seen as a "Hero" by the general public, and failing to respond to certain crimes in time will result in Spider-Man's reputation decreasing and him becoming a "Menace". When the latter happens, Enhanced Crime Task Force officers will be deployed across the city, and will attack Spider-Man on sight, making use of weaponry that disables Spider-Man's web shooters; they will disappear once Spider-Man rebuilds his reputation as a hero.

The game's map has been expanded compared to its predecessor, and now also features a subway system that allows the player to travel to Peter Parker's home in Queens, which serves as a hub. From where, players can replay story missions and equip alternate costumes for Spider-Man, unlocked from investigating Russian Hideouts or via DLC. Players can also use Spider-Man's smartphone to access the map, which provides the player with information of activities taking place in the area at the time, or to manage in-game messages and upgrades.

Missions have been altered to fit players' play style. Most of them now take place in the game's map or an outdoors location, and feature different approaches, allowing players to either engage all enemies in a certain area, or take them down in using stealth. The stealth segments have been improved since the game's predecessor; players are now able to take down enemies from a distance and from any surface they are on: the ground, a wall, or the ceiling. They can also rappel from their webs and perform inverted takedowns on enemies.

== Plot ==
Peter Parker has been fighting crime in New York City as Spider-Man for a year, motivated by the death of his Uncle Ben at the hand of criminal Dennis Carradine. Resuming his search for Carradine, whom he failed to catch one year ago, Spider-Man tracks him down using a lead from Herman Schultz, one of Carradine's contractors. However, Carradine is promptly killed by the "Carnage Killer", a serial killer who targets other criminals. Spider-Man vows to capture the Carnage Killer so that they may face justice.

Later, Spider-Man stops Schultz's gang and the Russian Mob from destroying the Oscorp building while raiding it for advanced weapons to help them win the turf war they have engaged in. Spider-Man rescues an electric engineer named Max Dillon, who idolizes him, and defeats Schultz, who is calling himself the "Shocker" after stealing a pair of vibro-shock gauntlets. Before being arrested, Shocker reveals that all major gangs in the city are now involved in the turf war and are fearful of the Carnage Killer. In response to the attack on Oscorp, the company's new CEO Harry Osborn and billionaire Wilson Fisk join forces to fund the Enhanced Crime Task Force, a privatized police force meant to contain criminals, as well as vigilantes like Spider-Man. Fisk intends to take over Oscorp however, albeit patiently, waiting for Harry to slowly die from the disease that killed his father, Norman Osborn.

Spider-Man begins to be mentored by Kraven the Hunter, who teaches him his hunting techniques to help him become a better hero, while working together to track down the Carnage Killer. Using information Spider-Man retrieves from the Russian Mob's hideouts, they deduce where the killer will strike next, but when Kraven advises letting the Killer go free so that Spider-Man can continue to learn while hunting him, the wall-crawler rejects Kraven and confronts the Carnage Killer. Revealing his real name is Cletus Kasady, the Carnage Killer claims that he and Spider-Man are very alike and should join forces, but is promptly defeated and arrested. Kasady is taken to the Ravencroft Institute for the Criminally Insane, where he is experimented on with a red substance code-named "Venom", originally meant to cure Norman Osborn's illness.

Following Kasady's capture, the gang war comes to an abrupt end as a crime lord known as the "Kingpin" seizes all the power. The Kingpin sends Felicia Hardy, a former bank robber who gained super-powers through genetic experiments funded by him, to kill Spider-Man, but she refuses to do so. Knowing the Kingpin will try to have her killed for disobeying him, Felicia reveals his identity as Fisk to Spider-Man before going into hiding. To learn more about Fisk's activities, Spider-Man visits Harry as Peter, only to discover his old friend's disease. Harry asks for Spider-Man's blood, believing it can be used to develop a cure, but the hero, afraid of the possible side effects, refuses to give it to him without properly researching it first. Impatient, Harry dismisses Spider-Man and vows to find another solution.

Meanwhile, Kraven lures Spider-Man into an ambush, where he reveals he was hired by Fisk to kill him, and only trained him to make Spider-Man a worthy opponent. After being defeated, Kraven reveals that Fisk is the one who sent Kasady on a killing spree, to scare the citizens of New York into supporting his plans for redeveloping the city, and to weaken Fisk's rivals so that he could take over. Spider-Man infiltrates Fisk's hideout, where he defeats him and tries to hack into his computer for incriminating evidence. However, he is forced to leave after Max Dillon escapes from Ravencroft (where he was incarcerated following the freak accident that transformed him into "Electro") and causes a blackout. Spider-Man tries to reason with Electro, who blames Spider-Man for abandoning him, but is forced to fight him, resulting in the latter's death.

Later, while responding to an attack on Oscorp, Spider-Man is shocked to find Harry, who has become the "Green Goblin" after injecting himself with Richard Parker's spider venom in hopes of curing himself. Spider-Man defeats Harry, who is mortally impaled by his own glider while trying to attack the hero from behind. Meanwhile, Kasady discovers how to bond with the symbiote he has been injected with and becomes "Carnage". He tries to escape from Ravencroft, but is defeated by Spider-Man after discovering the symbiote's weakness to fire. Wounded, Kasady begs Spider-Man to kill him, but the latter refuses, reminding him they are nothing alike. Kasady is subsequently re-incarcerated and the symbiote removed from his body.

After visiting his old friend Stan, Peter is inspired to be the man Uncle Ben would have wanted him to be, and resumes his never-ending battle against crime. Meanwhile, Fisk takes over Oscorp and decides to continue financing the Task Force alone, before being visited by the Chameleon, who has been posing as Harry's assistant Donald Menken to oversee Fisk's experiments at Ravencroft. When the Chameleon asks what their next move is, Fisk states that "now the real work begins".

== Development and release ==
The game was announced at New York Comic Con in October 2013 and was slated for a Spring 2014 release. Beenox once again became the developer of the game. Beenox originally planned to develop the 3DS version of the game, but dropped for unknown reasons and was given to High Voltage Software instead.

Motion capture performances were provided by Aaron Schoenke of Bat in the Sun Productions, as well as Sean T. Krishnan and Alina Andrei.

A small teaser trailer was released at the New York Comic Con in 2013 to support the first announcement of the game. The first trailer for the game was released to the public in January 2014. The release date for the console versions was announced in March. The walkthrough trailer was released on March 27. The launch trailer for the mobile version was released after the release of the game.

== Reception ==
Reception

Aggregate score
Aggregator	Score
Metacritic	iOS: 58/100; PC: 57/100; PS3: 57/100; PS4: 49/100; WIIU: 58/100; X360: 55/100; XONE: 46/100

Review scores
Publication	Score
Destructoid	6/10
Eurogamer	2/10
GameSpot	5/10
GamesRadar+	3/5
GameTrailers	5.3/10
IGN	5.4/10
Joystiq	2/5
Official Xbox Magazine (US)	7/10
PC Gamer (UK)	55/100
Polygon	6/10
TouchArcade	iOS: 2/5

The Amazing Spider-Man 2 received largely mixed reviews upon release, with most of the criticism aimed at the graphics, story, and glitches. On Metacritic, the iOS version of the game has a weighted aggregate rating of 58/100 based on 14 reviews, the PlayStation 3 version of the game has 57/100 based on 4 reviews, and the PlayStation 4 version of the game has 49/100 based on 44 reviews.

The Xbox 360 and PlayStation 3 versions were reviewed as "inferior" to the PlayStation 4 and Xbox One versions, primarily due to the fact that the older console versions suffered from poor lighting, frame rate drops, and poorly detailed textures. The PS4 version of the game received a 5.4/10 from IGN. The Xbox One version of the game received a 5.5/10 from Digital-Tutors stating the biggest issue was "...it just isn't polished, and based on the many issues we found with the game it looks thrown together in a rush trying to get it out the door in time for the release of the movie".

Bajo and Hex from ABC's Good Game found the game disappointing and both scored it a 4/10, with Hex saying: "This feels like a poor copy-paste job of The Amazing Spider-Man, with most of the good bits removed".

Eurogamer's Dan Whitehead scored the game a 2 out of 10, saying "it's like a part of me has died". Whitehead was very disappointed in the game because, as he is a big fan of Spider-Man, he felt that the game provided no significant fun for the player, whereas past Spider-Man games at least provided something. Whitehead stated: "Sullied by lacklustre gameplay and trampled by technical shoddiness, this time Spidey hasn't been done in by the Sinister Six, but reduced to a Terrible Two".

Tom McShea from GameSpot scored the game a 5/10. McShea called the representation of Spider-Man "enjoyable", and liked the "satisfying" boss battles, but criticized the controls, side-missions, and combat. McShea summarized his review by saying: "The biggest failing of The Amazing Spider-Man 2 is how familiar it feels. In fact, there have been other open-world games starring Spider-Man that walk a remarkably similar path. So there weren't many surprises, nothing that jumped out and made me take notice. Still, being able to spend time with Spider-Man was enough for me to stomach the various problems, just because he's a fun character to listen to. There's nothing majorly wrong with The Amazing Spider-Man 2, after all. There's just not a lot right with it, either".

Richard Grisham of GamesRadar was more positive of the game, giving it a 3 out of 5. He called the combat "shallow" but "enjoyable", praised the collectibles, and liked the "entertaining, fun" story. He did feel as though the game was a dated experience, and disliked the controls and mission variety.

In his review for Polygon, Justin McElroy scored the game a 6/10 and wrote: "I've accepted that there's probably never going to be a truly great Spider-Man game. If the dispiriting The Amazing Spider-Man 2 is any indication, Activision and Beenox may have reached the same conclusion. There have been many worse Spider-Man games than this. But I can't recall one that's swung so conceptually close to greatness only to let poor execution drag it back to Earth".

== Legacy ==
=== Future ===
The Amazing Spider-Man 2 is the last Spider-Man video game (and by extension, the final Marvel game) to be published by Activision, who lost the game publishing rights to multiple Marvel characters shortly before the game's release. By November 2015, Beenox had lost its license to develop console Spider-Man games, being restructured as a support studio within Activision for their Skylanders and Call of Duty franchises. The digital version of The Amazing Spider-Man 2 was delisted alongside the first game on January 4, 2017 across Steam, Xbox, PlayStation and Nintendo platforms.

It is also the last major Spider-Man video game to date, to be released for Xbox and Nintendo consoles, as Marvel Games would sign with publisher Sony Interactive Entertainment for a multi-game deal around AAA titles featuring Marvel characters, giving developer Insomniac Games the Spider-Man game license in turn. The studio went on to develop the Marvel's Spider-Man series as a first-party franchise published by SIE exclusively for PlayStation and PC platforms, beginning with the 2018 game Marvel's Spider-Man.

=== Usage in film ===
Archive footage from the game is featured in the 2023 animated feature film Spider-Man: Across the Spider-Verse, in which the game's depiction of Uncle Ben's death is used during Miguel O'Hara's demonstration of "canon events" across the Spider-Verse.
