= Spider-Slayer =

Fictional character

- The first Spider-Slayer. Art by Steve Ditko.

Publication information
- Publisher: Marvel Comics
- First appearance: The Amazing Spider-Man #25 (June 1965)
- Created by: Stan Lee (script); Steve Ditko (artist)

In-story information
- Species: Robot
- Abilities: Varies via various models

The Spider-Slayers are a series of fictional robots appearing in American comic books published by Marvel Comics. Created by Spencer Smythe, they were designed specifically to hunt down, capture, or kill Spider-Man. A new generation of Spider-Slayers was later created by Spencer's son, Alistair Smythe.

The Spider-Slayers have been featured in a number of Spider-Man adaptations outside of comics, including animated series and video games.

== Publication history ==
The Spider-Slayers first appeared in The Amazing Spider-Man #25 (June 1965) and were created by Stan Lee and Steve Ditko.

== Fictional character biography ==
See List of Spider-Slayers for a full breakdown of all versions of the Spider-Slayer.

The first series of robots were originally designed and built by Spencer Smythe with the financial backing of J. Jonah Jameson, who intends to capture and unmask Spider-Man. However, Spider-Man always manages to defeat the Slayers. Smythe's continued efforts to perfect his machines lead to him contracting fatal radiation poisoning from the building materials of his creations. Blaming both Jameson and Spider-Man for his condition, Smythe attempts to murder them both, but dies just before Spider-Man thwarts the attempt.

In The Amazing Spider-Man Annual #19 (1985), Smythe's son, Alistair Smythe, emerged as the new builder of the Spider-Slayers. He swore revenge on Spider-Man, repeatedly attacking the superhero with his own series of Slayers. Smythe is later transformed into a cyborg dubbed the Ultimate Spider-Slayer.

The original Spider-Slayer is seen among the robots and machines in the Reanimator's collection. Wolverine later destroys the Spider-Slayer when the Reanimator attempts to use it against him. J. Jonah Jameson utilizes the Spider-Slayer to attack She-Hulk, but it is destroyed again.

After becoming the mayor of New York City, Jameson has several old Spider-Slayers sent to him from storage to better equip his "Anti-Spider Squad" to take down Spider-Man. The Spider-Slayer technology is combined with that of the Mandroid suits. However, the "Spider-Slayer Squad" wearing the suits quit their jobs after Spider-Man saves them and New York from a dirty bomb.

When the Goblin King and his Goblin Underground cause havoc in Manhattan, J. Jonah Jameson unveils the Goblin-Slayers, which he plans to use against the Goblin Underground. The Superior Spider-Man (Doctor Octopus' mind in Peter Parker's body) is confronted by a group of Spider-Slayers and tries to fight them, but discovers that they are stronger than all previous versions. The Spider-Slayers are deactivated remotely by Spider-Man 2099, who confronts the Superior Spider-Man about who he really is and the reasons behind his actions of late. However, the Goblin King reactivates the Spider-Slayers and takes control of them.

== Other versions ==
=== Ultimate Marvel ===
An alternate universe version of the Spider-Slayers appears in the Ultimate Marvel imprint. These versions are constructed and remotely operated by the Tinkerer, who created them to battle Spider-Man if he ever went rogue. The Spider-Slayers are eight-foot-tall robots that balance on a large sphere and are equipped with two arm cannons.

=== MC2 ===
In the future timeline of MC2, Spider-Girl encounters the original Spider-Slayer after accidentally being sent back in time.

=== House of M ===
An alternate universe version of the Spider-Slayer appears in House of M. This version was created by J. Jonah Jameson and Alistair Smythe to attack Peter Parker after his secret identity is exposed and he is publicly revealed to not be a mutant. The Spider-Slayer attacks Peter's home, only to be destroyed by him.

=== What If ===
An alternate universe version of the Spider-Slayer appears in What If #82. After May Parker and John Jameson are killed in a space shuttle crash caused by the Chameleon, J. Jonah Jameson adopts Peter Parker and blames the two's deaths on Spider-Man. Obsessed with taking Spider-Man down, Jameson commissions the creation of the Spider-Slayer and the Scorpion formula, the latter of which is ingested by Flash Thompson. The serum warps Thompson's mind and causes him to go on a rampage, which ends after he is subdued by Spider-Man and the Spider-Slayer, controlled by Jameson. After learning Peter's secret identity, Jameson realizes how irrational his hatred of Spider-Man was and decides to help Peter fight crime using the Spider-Slayer.

== In other media ==
=== Television ===
The Black Widow, Tarantula, and Scorpion Spider-Slayers' combined form as depicted in Spider-Man: The Animated Series.

- The Mark I Spider-Slayer appears in the Spider-Man (1967) episode "Captured by J. Jonah Jameson". This version was built by Henry Smythe and is equipped with two metallic tentacle-like arms.
- The Spider-Slayers appear in Spider-Man: The Animated Series, consisting of robotic models the Black Widow, the Tarantula, and the Scorpion; the Mega Slayer android; and genetic mutation Alistair Smythe / Ultimate Spider-Slayer. Later similar robotic creations of Alistair Smythe such as the Goblin Robo Warrior, the Cyber-Skull and the Guardian Slayer also appear.
- The Spider-Slayers appear in Ultimate Spider-Man. These versions were created by Hydra and Doctor Octopus, who combined Spider-Man's DNA with Arnim Zola's Synthezoids. The group consists of Kaine (voiced by Drake Bell), Scarlet Spider (voiced by Scott Porter), and the Delta-Nine Synthezoids: Bone Spider, Goliath Spider (both voiced by Imari Williams), and Ghost Spider (voiced by Roger Craig Smith). Kaine is an imperfect Synthezoid who is highly resistant to damage, can reattach lost limbs, and feed off Spider-Man or the other Spider-Slayers' life energy. Scarlet Spider, later named Ben Reilly by May Parker, is an almost perfect clone of Spider-Man barring a facial scar and powers. Bone Spider has claws and spikes all over his body; Goliath Spider is the strongest Spider-Slayer who can turn his body into metal; and Ghost Spider can teleport, become intangible, and generate bio-electricity. Scarlet Spider infiltrates Spider-Man's Web Warriors to serve as Doctor Octopus' spy before eventually defecting to them while Kaine and the Delta-Nine Synthezoids mount failed attempts at killing the Web Warriors. Though Kaine absorbs the other Synthezoids to become the "Ultimate Spider-Slayer", he is defeated by Agent Venom.
- The Spider-Slayers appear in Spider-Man (2017). These versions resemble spiders and come in human-sized, mecha-sized, and miniature variants. The original Spider-Slayers were created by Spencer Smythe before Oscorp stole his schematics and created their own versions.

=== Video games ===
- The Spider-Slayers appears in Spider-Man (1995). In the SNES version, the Mark X and XIV Spider-Slayers appear as bosses, the Mark XVI and Mark XVII models appear as regular enemies, and the Mark XV is featured in Spectacular mode. In the Sega Genesis version, the Mark XV Spider-Slayer appears in the "Deconstruction Zone" level while the Mark X model serves as the boss of the "Mean Streets of the City" level.
- The Mark X and IX Spider-Slayers appear in The Amazing Spider-Man: Lethal Foes.
- The Spider-Slayers appear in The Amazing Spider-Man 3: Invasion of the Spider-Slayers.
- The Spider-Slayers appear in Spider-Man (2002). These versions are human-sized mechanical spiders previously known as "Hunter-Killers" created by Oscorp to hunt down the Scorpion initially and later Spider-Man.
- The Ultimate Marvel incarnation of the Spider-Slayers appear in Spider-Man: Shattered Dimensions. These versions are large androids armed with flamethrowers that were created by S.H.I.E.L.D. as a countermeasure to symbiotes.
- The Spider-Slayers, called S-Bots, appear in The Amazing Spider-Man (2012). These versions were created by Oscorp under Alistair Smythe's supervision as a countermeasure for the company's cross-species experiments. They consist of Sentries (which come in Medical, Combat, and Advanced Combat variants), Seekers (used to track down cross-species), and Hunters (arachnid-like flying robots called in by the Seekers to eliminate cross-species). There are also three unique robots created specifically for city-wide threats: S-01, a larger version of the Hunter that cannot fly but can fire lasers and homing missiles; S-02, a giant tentacled robot that resembles a snake and is equipped with drills for traveling underground; and S-03, a massive, heavily armed robot resembling a scorpion, which is manually controlled by Smythe.
  - The Hunters and Seekers also appear in The Amazing Spider-Man 2 (2014), in which they are used by the Enhanced Crime Task Force to hunt down Spider-Man if his hero reputation is too low.

=== Merchandise ===
The Spider-Slayers appear in the Spider-Man: The Animated Series tie-in toy line.

== See also ==
- Spencer Smythe
- Alistair Smythe
