= Alistair Smythe =

- Alistair Smythe as the Ultimate Spider-Slayer

Publication information
- Publisher: Marvel Comics
- First appearance: The Amazing Spider-Man Annual #19 (November 1985)
- Created by: Louise Simonson; Mary Wilshire

In-story information
- Alter ego: Alistair Alphonso Smythe
- Species: Human cyborg
- Notable aliases: The Ultimate Spider-Slayer
- Abilities: Genius-level intellect; Biorganic carapace grants: Superhuman strength, durability, speed, agility, and reflexes; Wall-crawling; Razor blades and talons; Artificial webbing from spinnerets on wrists

Alistair Alphonso Smythe (/smaɪθ/) is a supervillain appearing in American comic books published by Marvel Comics. The character is usually depicted as an enemy of the superhero Spider-Man, and the son of Spencer Smythe. After his father dedicated his life to eliminating Spider-Man and died as a result, Alistair inherited his Spider-Slayer legacy and developed a hatred for the web-slinger. He turned to a life of crime to exact revenge on Spider-Man, and created a new generation of Spider-Slayers to kill him, but this only resulted in Alistair getting paralyzed from the waist down. Later, he encased his body in a bioorganic carapace that allowed him to walk again, in addition to giving him superpowers, and adopted the alias of the Ultimate Spider-Slayer.

The character has been adapted from the comics into several other forms of media, including animated series and video games. Actor B. J. Novak portrayed Alistair Smythe in the 2014 film The Amazing Spider-Man 2. IGN ranked him as Spider-Man's 9th greatest enemy.

== Publication history ==
Alistair Smythe first appeared in The Amazing Spider-Man Annual #19 (November 1985) and was created by writer Louise Simonson and artist Mary Wilshire. He died in The Superior Spider-Man #13 (September 2013).

== Fictional character biography ==
The Spider-Slayers were a series of robots that sought to destroy Spider-Man. The initial generation of Spider-Slayers were created by Alistair Smythe's father Spencer Smythe. Spencer failed to kill Spider-Man and ended up dying as a result of prolonged exposure to the radioactive samples involved. Alistair inherits his father's legacy and gains a new-found hatred toward Spider-Man. However, his initial attempt fails after he mistakes Mary Jane Watson for Spider-Man. In the ensuing battle, Alistair's legs are badly injured.

After being confined in an asylum, Smythe releases himself and takes several other inmates with him to construct a new series of Spider-Slayers that track Spider-Man across the city. After sending a series of Spider-Slayers after Spider-Man, Smythe lures Spider-Man to his residence for one final battle. Smythe utilizes an bio-organic carapace that allows him to walk again by connecting with his spine. Eventually, Spider-Man defeats Smythe and ensures that he and the surviving asylum inmates are taken to custody.

Smythe, no longer in his carapace but with his ability to walk restored by his earlier use of it, escapes prison and seeks revenge on Spider-Man and J. Jonah Jameson for the death of his father. Smythe attacks Spider-Man with recreated versions of every previous Spider-Slayer plus a pair of new creations—a miniature model designed to latch onto Spider-Man's face and penetrate his mind, and a powerful six-armed model. Spider-Man eventually shuts down all the Spider-Slayers at the same time. Jameson beats Smythe to the verge of death with a baseball bat for threatening his family.

During the "Big Time" storyline, Smythe returns with a new metallic body armor and is hunting down all of J. Jonah Jameson's friends and family. He decides to seek out Mac Gargan for help, who is currently locked away in jail. Posing as a scientist, Smythe infiltrates the Raft and makes off with Gargan. He then performs a cybernetic operation on Gargan, turning him into a cyborg, and convinces him to join his crusade against Jameson. Smythe, Gargan, and Fly-Girl lead their army to attack the site of John Jameson's latest space mission, sabotaging the launch and holding John for ransom. Smythe's new plan is to kill all those close to Jameson, but not to kill Jameson himself so Jameson could feel the same suffering that he did losing his father. Smythe's actions lead to the death of Jameson's wife Marla Jameson.

J. Jonah Jameson calls in the Superior Spider-Man to help oversee the execution of Alistair Smythe and ensure that he does not escape. Smythe tries to taunt the Superior Spider-Man by mentioning Marla Jameson's death, but he brushes him off. Mayor Jameson and Superior Spider-Man, alongside Jameson's assistant Glory Grant, watch Smythe's execution. As Smythe's execution begins, a swarm of miniature Spider-Slayers attack. Smythe attempts to escape, but finds that Spider-Man has prepared himself for every method of escape he may try, prompting Smythe to shift his plan to kill Spider-Man.

Superior Spider-Man succeeds in killing Smythe, but only his physical body, as his robotic components keep his mind intact. Smythe attacks the survivors, disarming the guards. Superior Spider-Man tackles Smythe, and they fall onto the shore below. Smythe attempts to transfer his mind into Superior Spider-Man, but is unsuccessful and dies.

In the Dead No More: The Clone Conspiracy storyline, the Jackal resurrects Alistair and Spencer Smythe in clone bodies.

== Powers and abilities ==
Alistair Smythe is a gifted scientist specializing in robotics, cybernetics, and genetics. His most notable inventions are the Spider-Slayers, robots built for the express purpose of capturing or killing Spider-Man. Though the idea for these came from his father, Alistair made advances/improvements on the originals.

=== Equipment ===
Later, Alistair invented a bio-organic carapace that serves as full body armor. It gave him increased strength and the ability to walk again by interfacing with his spinal cord. It has bird-like talons for feet, a long, curved bladed weapon jutting from each shoulder, and smaller, jagged blades on each forearm. The carapace also has built-in web shooters that fire an adhesive substance from both wrists. While wearing this armor, Alistair was granted enhanced durability, speed, agility, and reflexes, as well as the ability to cling to solid surfaces.

== Other versions ==
An alternate universe version of Alistair Smythe appears in Spider-Man: House of M #3.

== In other media ==
=== Television ===
- Alistair Smythe appears in Spider-Man: The Animated Series, voiced by Maxwell Caulfield. This version was crippled in a lab accident and primarily uses a hoverchair for transportation. After witnessing his father Spencer's apparent death, Alistair begins working for the Kingpin and builds several Spider-Slayers while seeking revenge against Spider-Man, whom he blames for his father's fate. After failing Kingpin several times and inadvertently contributing to Richard Fisk's arrest, Smythe plans to sell the former out, but is caught in the act. He is then genetically altered into the Ultimate Spider-Slayer by his replacement, Herbert Landon, against his will and battles Spider-Man before breaking free of the Kingpin's programming and discovering Spencer's cryogenically preserved body. Alistair then works for several resourceful individuals, such as Silvermane and Miles Warren, in exchange for his father's revival.
  - Additionally, an alternate reality version of Alistair appears in the two-part series finale "Spider Wars".
- Alistair Smythe appears in Spider-Man (2017), voiced by Jason Spisak. This version is a teenage student of the Osborn Academy who has a strained relationship with his father Spencer and does not respect his scientific prowess. Throughout the series, he wields upgraded Vulture technology and operates an Ultimate Spider-Slayer mech on separate occasions. He later joins the Osborn Commandos before the group is brainwashed by Doctor Octopus, who re-brands the group the Sinister Six until they are freed by Spider-Man and Harry Osborn / Hobgoblin.

=== Film ===
Alistair Smythe appears in The Amazing Spider-Man 2, portrayed by B. J. Novak. This version is a supervisor at Oscorp and the head of its engineering division.

=== Video games ===
- Alistair Smythe appears as a boss in The Amazing Spider-Man: Lethal Foes.
- Alistair Smythe appears as a boss in the SNES and Sega Genesis versions of Spider-Man (1995).
- Alistair Smythe appears in The Amazing Spider-Man, voiced by Nolan North. This version is a high-ranking Oscorp scientist who pressured the company to invest heavily in robotics and attempted to dispose of their cross-species experiments, which were created using Curt Connors' research. Following the cross-species' escape into Manhattan, Smythe dispatches his S-Bots to contain and eliminate them, as well as Spider-Man and Connors once they begin interfering with his plans. After being infected with a virus carried by the cross-species, Smythe becomes a paraplegic and is driven insane, attempting to distribute an unstable, nanobot-based cure for the virus before Spider-Man stops him. He is later arrested, but escapes custody and commands one of his robots to kill him before he can succumb to the virus.
- Alistair Smythe appears in Marvel Heroes.
- Alistair Smythe as the Ultimate Spider-Slayer appears as a playable character in Spider-Man Unlimited.
