= Chameleon (character) =

Supervillain appearing in Marvel Comics

The Chameleon
- Textless cover to Giant-Size Amazing Spider-Man: Chameleon Conspiracy #1 (June 2021). Art by Mark Bagley, Andrew Hennessy, and Brian Reber.

Publication information
- Publisher: Marvel Comics
- First appearance: The Amazing Spider-Man #1 (March 1963)
- Created by: Stan Lee; Steve Ditko

In-story information
- Alter ego: Dmitri Nikolayevich "Anatoly" Smerdyakov
- Species: Human mutate
- Team affiliations: Sinister Six; Kravinoff Family; Sinister Twelve; Exterminators; Hydra; KGB
- Abilities: Master of disguise; Appearance alteration; Decelerated aging; Skilled actor and impressionist

The Chameleon (Dmitri Smerdyakov; Russian: Дмитрий Смердяков) is a supervillain appearing in American comic books published by Marvel Comics. Created by writer Stan Lee and artist Steve Ditko, the character first appeared in the debut issue of The Amazing Spider-Man in March 1963 as the first super-criminal to face Spider-Man. The Chameleon has since endured as one of Spider-Man's recurring enemies, belonging to the collective of adversaries that make up his rogues gallery.

In the Marvel Universe, the Chameleon is a master of disguise who can impersonate virtually anyone. Throughout his comic book appearances, his abilities have stemmed from the use of lifelike masks, holographic technology, and mutagenic enhancement, while his role in Spider-Man stories has varied from being depicted as a spy, hitman, and criminal mastermind. The Chameleon is also the half-brother of Kraven the Hunter and has operated as a member of the Sinister Six and the Sinister Twelve at various points in his history.

The character has been featured in various other Marvel-licensed products, including feature films, television series, and video games. The character made his live-action debut in the Marvel Cinematic Universe (MCU) film Spider-Man: Far From Home (2019), portrayed by Numan Acar, while Fred Hechinger appeared as the Chameleon in the Sony's Spider-Man Universe (SSU) film Kraven the Hunter (2024).

== Publication history ==
=== 1960s ===
Dmitri Smerdyakov debuted in The Amazing Spider-Man #1 (March 1963), created by writer Stan Lee and artist Steve Ditko. The Chameleon is therefore the first member of Spider-Man's rogues' gallery based on issue publication date, excluding the Burglar who murdered Ben Parker in Amazing Fantasy #15. He would later go on to appear in other titles such as Tales to Astonish, Tales of Suspense, and Web of Spider-Man.

=== 2000s ===
Dmitri Smerdyakov appeared in the 2014 Original Sin: Secret Avengers Infinite Comic series. He later appeared in the 2015 Spider-Man and the X-Men series. He appeared in the 2018 Amazing Spider-Man series. He appeared in the 2021 Giant-Size Amazing Spider-Man: Chameleon Conspiracy one-shot.

== Fictional character biography ==
Dmitri Smerdyakov was born in Soviet Russia. In his youth, he becomes a servant to his half-brother Sergei Kravinoff, and later a minor associate of Gustav Fiers. Although Dmitri and Sergei are friends, Sergei is often abusive to him, leading to a combination of admiration and resentment towards Kravinoff. Eventually, Smerdyakov emigrates to the United States of America. Having made a talent for himself during his youth by impressing Sergei by impersonating friends and neighbors, he assumes a new disguise: the identity of Chameleon. During his first known criminal outing, he impersonates Spider-Man, but is soon exposed and arrested. Shortly afterward, Sergei (now known as "Kraven the Hunter") comes to the United States, and the Chameleon sets his old associate's sights on Spider-Man. Kraven and Chameleon both become long-time enemies of Spider-Man, part of his primary rogues gallery.

When Kraven commits suicide, the Chameleon becomes obsessed with making Spider-Man suffer for his failure to prevent this. He ingests a serum which makes his face featureless and malleable. He attempts to kidnap America's leading expert on superconductors, but is thwarted by Spider-Man. He then kidnaps J. Jonah Jameson. He approaches the Maggia for support to be New York's new crime lord, and forms an alliance with Hammerhead. Disguised as a scientist, the Chameleon temporarily removes Spider-Man's powers. He allies with the Femme Fatales, Scorpion, and Tarantula to eliminate Spider-Man and the Black Cat, but escapes when his plan fails.

Chameleon forms an alliance with Harry Osborn as the Green Goblin. Before Harry's death, the Chameleon is told that Spider-Man's secret identity can be found through Peter Parker, leading him to construct androids of Peter's parents, Richard and Mary Parker; Chameleon later admits that he went through with the plot to confirm that Peter was Spider-Man. The plan leads to a psychotic breakdown for both Spider-Man and Chameleon, with Spider-Man briefly renouncing the civilian identity while Chameleon is sent to Ravencroft. The "One More Day" storyline ends with the removal of Peter and Mary Jane's timeline from all memories, as well as knowledge of Spider-Man's identity, including the Chameleon.

The Chameleon later becomes a member of Doctor Octopus's latest incarnation of the Sinister Six. He poses as Steve Rogers to infiltrate an Air Force base. The Chameleon disguises himself as a tribal chief when he and Mysterio attack indigenous peoples using robots of the other Sinister Six members.

Following the "Dying Wish" storyline, the Chameleon fights Superior Spider-Man (Otto Octavius's mind in Spider-Man's body) and the Secret Avengers on the S.H.I.E.L.D. Helicarrier. The Chameleon ends up knocked unconscious, and the Superior Spider-Man transports him to his hidden underwater lab where he ends up imprisoned. The Chameleon, Electro, Sandman, Mysterion, and the Vulture are later seen as part of the "Superior Six" team. The Superior Spider-Man places the Six under his control to redeem them for their crimes, forcing them to risk their lives doing heroic deeds against their will. The Six eventually break free of the Superior Spider-Man's control and attempt to exact revenge, nearly destroying New York in the process.

== Powers and abilities ==
The Chameleon originally had no superhuman abilities. He simply used makeup and elaborate costuming to impersonate his targets. He implemented a device in a belt buckle that emitted a gas that helped him mold his features. He later obtained a microcomputer from Spencer Smythe for his belt buckle that could be programmed with the facial features of hundreds of people. The belt buckle also contains a video receiver that enables the computer to analyze the appearance of anyone the Chameleon encounters so that it can duplicate their features using electrical impulses. The computer utilizes holographic technology that allows him to change his appearance at the push of a button. His electronic devices allowed him to simultaneously appear as two different people to two separate observers. The Chameleon's costume consists of "memory material" that can be altered by electrical impulses from his belt to resemble the clothing of the person he is impersonating.

The character's powers were later made innate. His skin pigmentation have been surgically and mutagenically altered by a serum so that he can take on the appearance of any person at will. He also wears fabric made of memory material that responds to nerve impulses and can appear to be whatever costume he wishes to be. The Chameleon had taken the same serums that Kraven had taken over the years.

The Chameleon is a master of disguise and a brilliant method actor. He is an expert impressionist, a master of creating life-like masks and make-up. He is a quick-change artist who can assume a new disguise in less than a minute, but he rarely needs to use such skills. The character speaks several languages fluently. Although the Chameleon is not a scientific genius, during his increased lifespan he has been exposed to a wide collection of sophisticated experimental technology, many of which he can apply in his schemes.

== Reception ==
Bradley Prim of Screen Rant called the Chameleon one of Spider-Man's "iconic villains." Tom Bowen of Game Rant ranked him 12th in their "28 Best Spider-Man Villains Of All Time" list. Scoot Allan of Comic Book Resources ranked Dmitri Smerdyakov 5th in their "10 Most Iconic Spider-Man Villains" list, writing, "The Chameleon quickly became one of Spider-Man's most personal and iconic villains after Kraven's suicide turned Smerdyakov vengeful." Jesse Schedeen of IGN ranked Chameleon 14th in their "Top 25 Spider-Man Villains" list, stating, "The fact that he has been such a mainstay of Spidey's rogues gallery ever since is a testament to his enduring appeal."

== Other versions ==
=== Chameleon 2099 ===
An alternate universe version of Dmitri Smerdyakov appears in Marvel 2099. A designer drug that causes its users to involuntarily shapeshift in response to whatever emotion they are feeling at the time is nicknamed "Chameleon". Spider-Man tracks down the distributor of the Chameleon, a hippie known as Major Jones. While battling Jones and his minions, Spider-Man accidentally knocks Jones into his supply of the drug, causing him to mutate into an amorphous blob.

=== Chameleon 2211 ===
An alternate universe version of Dmitri Smerdyakov appears in Friendly Neighborhood Spider-Man. He has the powers of physically changing into any shape or form after accessing their DNA. This usually involves sampling their blood after killing the subject, although less lethal methods are possible; he was able to change into Sandman after an accidental ingestion of some of his sand.

=== Earth-71490 ===
An alternate universe version of the Chameleon from Earth-71490 appears in Edge of Spider-Verse (vol. 2) #5. This version possesses shapeshifting abilities.

=== Marvel Noir ===
An alternate universe version of Dmitri Smerdyakov appears in Spider-Man Noir. This version is a former circus freak who works for Norman Osborn and possesses a malleable clay-like body. He is later killed by Felicia Hardy.

=== Ultimate Marvel ===
Two characters based on the Chameleon, Carnilla and her unnamed brother, from Earth-1610 appear in the Ultimate Marvel universe.

== In other media ==
=== Television ===
- The Chameleon appears in The Marvel Super Heroes, voiced by Tom Harvey.
- The Chameleon appears in the Spider-Man (1981) episode "Arsenic and Aunt May", voiced by John H. Mayer.
- The Chameleon appears in the Spider-Man and His Amazing Friends episode "Seven Little Superheroes", voiced by Hans Conried.
- The Chameleon appears in Spider-Man: The Animated Series. This version is the stepson of the Red Skull and stepbrother of Electro. While working as a spy, hitman, and double agent in the Kingpin's Insidious Six, Chameleon initially uses a belt with a holographic image inducer to disguise himself as others before undergoing experimentation to gain natural shapeshifting abilities. Notably, he never uses his "true" voice, as he only speaks while imitating others.
- The Chameleon appears in The Spectacular Spider-Man, voiced by Steve Blum. This version uses lifelike masks like his original comics counterpart.
- The Chameleon appears in Spider-Man (2017), voiced by Patton Oswalt. This version uses a face mask capable of capturing a person's image to disguise himself.

=== Film ===
Dmitri Smerdyakov / Chameleon appears in Kraven the Hunter, portrayed by Fred Hechinger as an adult and Billy Barratt as a teenager. This version is Nikolai Kravinoff's son in addition to being Sergei Kravinoff's half-brother who initially possesses the ability to mimic other people's voices. As a teenager, Dmitri was abused by Nikolai, who considered him weak, and continued to suffer abuse from him after Sergei ran away from home. As an adult, he acquires shapeshifting capabilities after being experimented on by a mad scientist sometime after Nikolai's death.

=== Marvel Cinematic Universe ===
Characters based on Dmitri Smerdyakov / Chameleon appear in media set in the Marvel Cinematic Universe (MCU):

- Dmitri Smerdyakov, credited as simply "Dimitri", appears in Spider-Man: Far From Home, portrayed by Numan Acar. This version is an associate of Nick Fury (in reality Talos posing as Fury) who poses as the bus driver for Peter Parker's class during their school trip across Europe.
- An alternate universe version of Smerdyakov appears in Your Friendly Neighborhood Spider-Man, voiced by Roger Craig Smith.

=== Video games ===
- The Chameleon appears in the SNES version of Spider-Man (1995).
- The Chameleon appears in Spider-Man: The Sinister Six (1996), voiced by Dan Kamin. This version is a member of the Sinister Six.
- The Chameleon appears in The Amazing Spider-Man 2, voiced by Glenn Steinbaum. This version works for the Kingpin and posed as Donald Menken to oversee his employer's experiments at Ravencroft and help him take over Oscorp.
- The Chameleon appears in Spider-Man 2, voiced by Jim Pirri. This version is a longtime foe of the original Spider-Man who escaped from prison years earlier, and the half-brother of Kraven the Hunter, who deploys drones around New York City to find him. The Spider-Men find the drones and analyze the data they have gathered, eventually realizing Kraven is looking for the Chameleon, who has adopted countless identities to avoid detection. Following a failed attempt on Kraven's life, the Chameleon observes the Spider-Men from a distance and vows to "do what [Kraven] could not."
- The Chameleon appears in Marvel Snap.

=== Miscellaneous ===
- The Chameleon appears in the Sinister Six novel trilogy by Adam-Troy Castro.
- The Chameleon appears in Spider-Man Unlimited #5. This version is a humanoid chameleon with shapeshifting abilities.
- The Chameleon appears in Iron Man #4.
- The Chameleon appears in several Magic: The Gathering cards.
