= Oscorp =

Fictional multinational corporation appearing in publications by Marvel Comics

- Oscorp, from Dark Reign: The List - Amazing Spider-Man #1 (January 2010). Art by Adam Kubert.

In-story information
- Type of business: Corporation
- Owner(s): Norman Osborn (former)
- Employee(s): Mendel Stromm; Donald Menken; Arthur Stacy

Oscorp (sometimes stylized as OsCorp), also known as Oscorp Industries, is a fictional multibillion-dollar multinational corporation appearing in American comic books published by Marvel Comics, predominantly in stories about Spider-Man. The company was founded by Norman Osborn and has appeared in numerous media adaptations. It first appeared in The Amazing Spider-Man #37 (March, 1966) and was created by Stan Lee and Steve Ditko.

== History ==
The corporation is based out of the Oscorp Tower in New York City. It was created and run by its CEO Norman Osborn, who formed a business partnership with Mendel Stromm. Since Osborn provided the bulk of the financing, the company was called the Osborn Corporation, or Oscorp.

Stromm's early research was on a chemical that would provide enhanced strength in its test subjects and would eventually turn Osborn into the Green Goblin. Osborn, wanting the formula for himself, discovered that Stromm had been embezzling funds from Oscorp. Stromm explained that he was merely borrowing but Osborn turned him over to the police. After several years in prison, Stromm was released and tried to kill Osborn for revenge.

Jay Allan's company "Allan Chemical" was merged with Osborn's stocks from Oscorp and the last remaining properties of Horizon Labs after its destruction, establishing it under the new name of Alchemax.

It was later revealed that Norman Osborn under the guise of "Mason Banks" created the corporation in order to leave a strong empire for his grandson and establish an empire for the Osborn legacy. Their headquarters Oscorp Tower was the former headquarters of Oscorp.

== Fictional staff members ==
=== Current ===
- Norman Osborn - The founder and CEO of Oscorp.

=== Former ===
- Arthur Stacy - The chief of security at Oscorp. Stacy is the brother of George Stacy and the uncle of Gwen Stacy.
- Charles Standish - The senior vice-president of Oscorp.
- Donald Menken - The personal assistant of Norman Osborn.
- Dr. David Patrick Lowell - A scientist who became Sundown upon being drenched in his chemicals that was similar to the Goblin Formula.
- Dr. Malek - A scientist who was part of the research team that was experimenting on Freak.
- Dr. Nels van Adder - A research scientist whose formula turned him into the Proto-Goblin.
- Dr. David Lowell - He developed the Photogenesis Project for Oscorp, and discovered a way to give a human superpowers through photosynthesis.
- Harry Osborn - Norman's son who for a time was CEO.
- Mendel Stromm - Former partner of Norman Osborn.
- Mark Raxton - Former head of security.

== Other versions ==
=== Ultimate Marvel ===
In the Ultimate Marvel universe, Oscorp developed the Oz super soldier serum and the spiders that gave Peter Parker and Miles Morales superpowers. After Norman Osborn injected himself with Oz serum and became the Green Goblin, many of Oscorp's scientists were killed or transitioned to other companies.

=== Ultimate Universe ===
In Earth-6160, Oscorp is one of the largest companies of the North American Union, a regional power bloc which includes the United States. Norman Osborn operated as CEO before his death in a false flag attack on Stark Tower orchestrated by the Maker's Council. After Norman's death, Harry Osborn and Gwen Stacy take control of Oscorp.

== In other media ==
=== Television ===
- Oscorp appears in Spider-Man: The Animated Series. In the first season, Norman Osborn hires Spencer Smythe to create the Spider-Slayer in exchange for building a hoverchair for Spencer's paralyzed son, Alistair. After the Spider-Slayer is destroyed by Spider-Man, the Oscorp building explodes and Spencer is seemingly killed. Spencer survives and is found by the Kingpin, who works with the Hobgoblin to kidnap Norman's son Harry. When the Kingpin refuses to pay Hobgoblin immediately, they cease their partnership. Following this, Osborn sells 50% of his company to the Kingpin to repay his debt. After becoming the Green Goblin, Norman is defeated by Spider-Man and sustains amnesia that renders him unable to remember that he is the Green Goblin. The following day, Norman publicly announces that Oscorp will no longer produce chemical weapons and allows Harry to be brought into the company.
- Oscorp appears in Spider-Man: The New Animated Series.
- Oscorp appears in The Spectacular Spider-Man.
- Oscorp appears in Ultimate Spider-Man. Similar to the Ultimate Marvel reality, Norman allies with Doctor Octopus to capture Spider-Man, intending to create super soldiers from his DNA. After Taskmaster fails to capture Spider-Man, Doctor Octopus is enraged and destroys the Oscorp facility.
- An Oscorp building appears in the Avengers Assemble episode "Dark Avengers".
- Oscorp appears in Spider-Man (2017). This version of the company created the spider that gave Peter Parker his powers. Additionally, Norman Osborn founded the school Osborn Academy as a technological rival to Horizon High and a hi-tech security force called the Osborn Commandos made up of Osborn Academy's staff and students.
- Oscorp appears in Your Friendly Neighborhood Spider-Man.

=== Film ===
==== Sam Raimi's Spider-Man trilogy ====
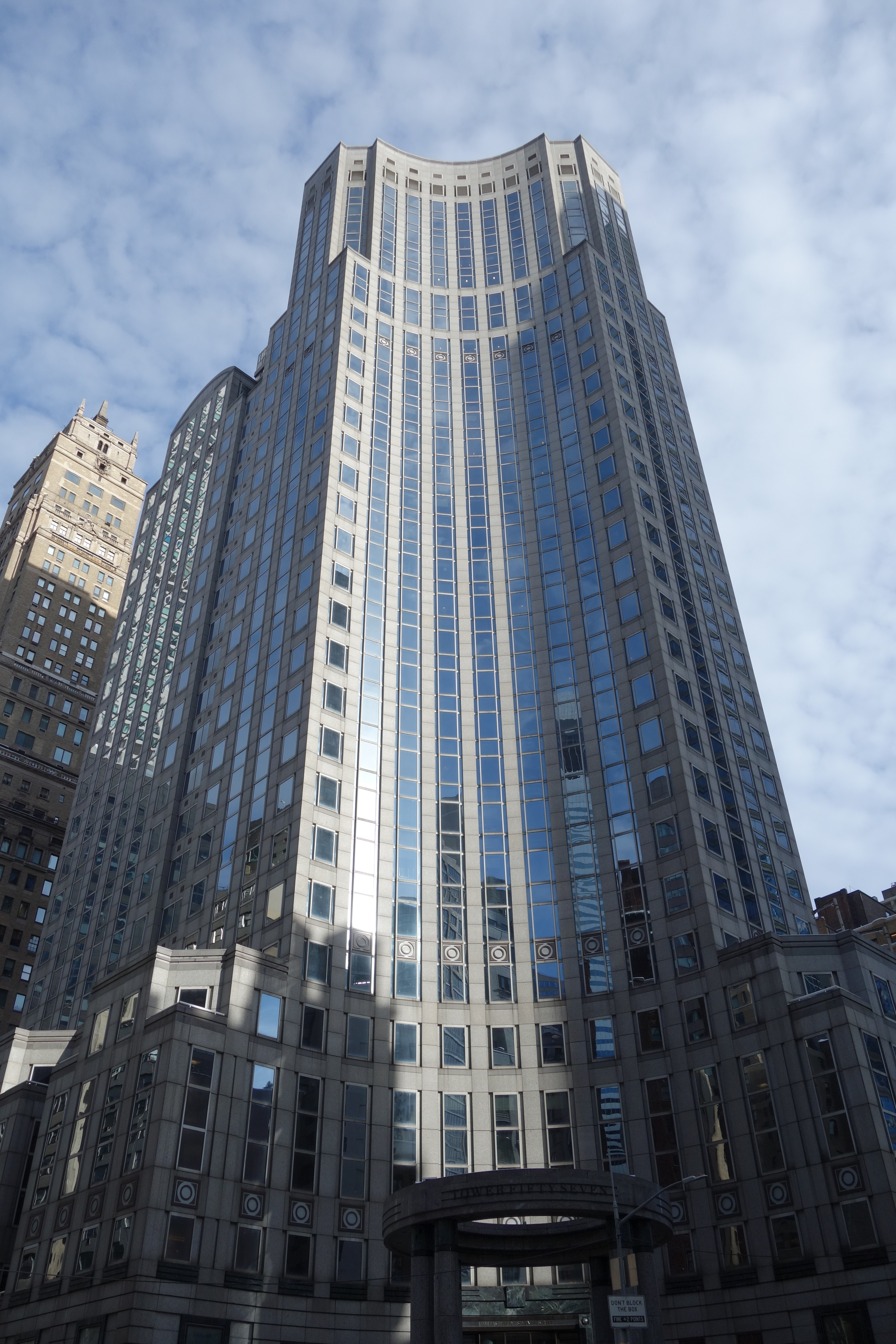
Tower Fifty Seven at Lexington Avenue and 57th Street was used for the exterior of the Oscorp Tower in Sam Raimi's Spider-Man (2002).

Oscorp is featured in the first two films of Sam Raimi's Spider-Man trilogy.

- Oscorp Labs appears throughout Spider-Man (2002). Depicted as a chemical corporation based in New York headed by Norman Osborn (Willem Dafoe) and Mendel Stromm, it had a hand in military technology that produced a green metal flight-suit and purple flying glider, which Norman utilizes after becoming the Green Goblin.
- In Spider-Man 2 (2004), Harry assumes control of Oscorp after Norman's death and funds Otto Octavius' ambition for fusion power.

==== The Amazing Spider-Man duology ====
Oscorp appears in The Amazing Spider-Man (2012) and The Amazing Spider-Man 2 (2014). This version of the company is involved in a variety of illegal conspiracies, such as the framing and murder of Richard and Mary Parker, and the development of the spider-venom that gave Spider-Man his powers. Additionally, Oscorp has control over the Ravencroft Institute, in which they perform illegal experiments on the institute's patients.

==== Marvel Cinematic Universe ====
The Oscorp building from The Amazing Spider-Man was intended to appear in the Marvel Cinematic Universe film The Avengers. However, by the time the Oscorp building was fully designed for The Amazing Spider-Man, the skyline for The Avengers was rendered, resulting in Oscorp being abandoned due to timing constraints.

==== Sony's Spider-Man Universe ====
An Oscorp building appears in the trailer for the Sony's Spider-Man Universe film Morbius. However, Oscorp was cut from the final version of the film.

=== Video games ===
- Oscorp appears in the Spider-Man tie-in game. The company in the game parallels that of the film, with Norman Osborn and his scientists attempting to capture Spider-Man in order to study his genetics to perfect a super-soldier serum that the company needs to develop for a military contract. After a number of failed attempts to capture Spider-Man using Oscorp robots, Norman subjects himself to the unfinished serum and becomes the Green Goblin.
- Oscorp appears in Spider-Man: Friend or Foe.
- Oscorp appears in Lego Marvel Super Heroes.
- Oscorp appears in The Amazing Spider-Man tie-in game.
- Oscorp appears in The Amazing Spider-Man 2 tie-in game.
- Oscorp appears in Marvel Contest of Champions.
- Oscorp Tower appears in Marvel Snap.

==== Marvel's Spider-Man game series ====
Oscorp Industries appears in the Marvel's Spider-Man series developed by Insomniac Games. This version of the company was co-founded by Norman Osborn and Otto Octavius, and its name derives from "the Os", Norman and Otto's college nickname. However, Otto eventually left the company due to Norman's corruption and the dangerous and unethical experiments Oscorp conducted. Thanks to Norman's position as mayor of New York, Oscorp technology has been implemented into many of the city's public services. Research stations were also set up throughout the city by Norman's son Harry Osborn to carry out his late mother Emily's wishes of eradicating pollution and cleaning the environment and are part of a side-quest in the first game.

- In Marvel's Spider-Man (2018), the company plays a central role, as it was responsible for the creation of the "Devil's Breath", a bio-weapon originally intended to be a treatment for genetic disorders, in particular the illness that killed Norman's wife Emily and later also affected Harry. After one of the test subjects for Devil's Breath, Martin Li, gained super powers from it and accidentally killed his parents, he becomes the crime boss Mister Negative to pursue revenge against Norman. Additionally, after Norman withdraws Otto's funding for his research into advanced prosthetic limbs in a thinly veiled attempt to get him to return to Oscorp, Otto becomes inspired by Li's actions to pursue his own vendetta. Seeking to ruin Norman's reputation, Otto forms the Sinister Six and organizes several attacks against Oscorp while also releasing the Devil's Breath in an attempt to expose Norman's role in its creation. Oscorp's response is to hire Sable International and allow them to put the city under martial law, resulting in further abuses and corruption. The former chief scientist of the Devil's Breath project, Morgan Michaels, eventually betrays his employer by helping Spider-Man devise a cure for the virus. Once the Devil's Breath outbreak is stopped and the Sinister Six are defeated, Oscorp is able to avoid any major lawsuits, though Norman resigns as mayor in disgrace.
- In Marvel's Spider-Man: Miles Morales, the Underground use Oscorp's abandoned science center as a hideout. The science center prior to being abandoned appears in a flashback in which Miles Morales and Phin Mason win a contest held there by presenting the energy converter they created before entering their respective high schools. The science center is also the place where Miles indirectly met Peter Parker and Otto, when the latter two visited the center for an idea of their prosthetic limbs project.
- In Marvel's Spider-Man 2, it is revealed that Oscorp retrieved the Venom symbiote after it crash-landed outside New York, which was later experimented on by Dr. Curt Connors, turning it into an organic suit that can heal whoever it is bonded to. After discovering that the symbiote is sentient and can influence the behavior of its host, however, Connors advised to destroy it, but Norman attempted to use it to cure Harry's illness. This eventually results in Harry becoming Venom and starting a symbiote invasion in New York, which is thwarted by the Spider-Men (Peter Parker and Miles Morales) and Mary Jane Watson, while Venom is destroyed, leaving Harry in a comatose state. This prompts Norman to order his scientists to use the "G-serum" on his son and vow revenge against the Spider-Men, whom he blames for Harry's condition.
