= Spencer Smythe =

Fictional character

Publication information
- Publisher: Marvel Comics
- First appearance: The Amazing Spider-Man #25 (June 1965)
- Created by: Stan Lee; Steve Ditko

In-story information
- Species: Human
- Partnerships: J. Jonah Jameson (formerly)
- Abilities: Genius-level intellect; Expertise in arachnology and robotics

Spencer Smythe (/smaɪθ/) is a supervillain appearing in American comic books published by Marvel Comics. The character is usually depicted as an enemy of the superhero Spider-Man, as well as the father of Alistair Smythe. A scientist researching robotics and arachnids, Spencer turned to crime to finance his research and dedicated his life to capturing Spider-Man. He is best known for creating the Spider-Slayers, robots designed specifically to hunt down, capture, or kill the web-slinger.

Outside of comics, the character has appeared in several Spider-Man media adaptations, including animated series and video games.

== Publication history ==
Spencer Smythe and the Spider-Slayers first appeared in The Amazing Spider-Man #25 (June 1965), and were created by writer Stan Lee and artist Steve Ditko.

== Fictional character biography ==
Spencer Smythe is an expert in robotics and arachnids who asks J. Jonah Jameson to fund his projects, having been convinced by Jameson's editorials that Spider-Man is a menace. After watching a demonstration showing that Smythe's robot can sense and track spiders, Jameson hires Smythe to capture Spider-Man, with Jameson controlling the Spider-Slayer. However, Spider-Man escapes by leaving his suit wrapped in the robot's tentacles.

Annoyed at his robot's inability to capture Spider-Man, Smythe obsesses over Spider-Man, turning to crime to finance his research and constantly improving his robots which he dubbed Spider-Slayers. His creations, no matter how deadly or powerful he made, are defeated by Spider-Man utilizing a key flaw in their designs.

Smythe is fatally poisoned by the radioactive materials used in the robots' manufacturing, leaving him to a slow and agonizing death. Blaming Spider-Man and Jameson equally for his impending death, Smythe handcuffs the two together with a bomb scheduled to detonate in 24 hours, determined to make the two suffer the agony of inescapable death that he saw the two as having condemned him to. Smythe dies before the 24 hours are up, convinced that he had killed off the two responsible. Spider-Man stops the bomb by freezing its controls moments before it detonates.

During the Dead No More: The Clone Conspiracy storyline, Spencer is resurrected in a clone body by Ben Reilly's company New U Technologies, but is later killed again.

== Skills and abilities ==
Spencer Smythe is quite intelligent, capable of designing advanced robots that could pursue solitary targets. These robots were physically dangerous enough to overpower Spider-Man at multiple points, but lacked A.I. software.

== In other media ==
=== Television ===
- A character based on Spencer Smythe, named Henry Smythe, appears in the Spider-Man (1967) episode "Captured by J. Jonah Jameson", voiced by Henry Ramer.
- Spencer Smythe appears in Spider-Man: The Animated Series, voiced by Edward Mulhare. After being enlisted by Norman Osborn to capture Spider-Man in exchange for building a hover-chair for his paralyzed son Alistair Smythe, Spencer creates his first Spider-Slayer, the Black Widow, to achieve this. However, its fight with Spider-Man leads to a fire at Oscorp. With Osborn's negative reinforcement, Spencer stays behind to ensure Spider-Man dies and Alistair gets the hover-chair, but is seemingly killed when Oscorp explodes. Later in the series, it is revealed that Spencer survived and was placed in cryogenic suspension by the Kingpin to ensure Alistair's loyalty. Alistair eventually discovers his father's preserved body and recovers it with Spider-Man's help before working for various individuals to revive Spencer.
- Spencer Smythe appears in Spider-Man (2017), voiced by Benjamin Diskin. This version is a strict science teacher at Midtown High School and Alistair Smythe's estranged father. Throughout the series, he is hired by Norman Osborn to sabotage Anya Corazon's experiment and frame Harry Osborn to get him suspended from Midtown High, and attempts to steal Harry's work with the Vulture's help, only for Spider-Man to destroy it. Norman reneges on their deal, leading to Spencer working with Raymond Warren to steal Oscorp's genetically modified spiders. After one specimen escapes, bites Miles Morales, and turns him into the Ultimate Spider-Man, Spencer and Alistair fight each other in their Spider-Slayer mechs to capture him. Both are defeated by the two Spider-Men, though only Spencer is arrested while his son escapes.

=== Video games ===
- Spencer Smythe appears in the PS2 and PSP versions of Spider-Man: Web of Shadows. This version is aligned with A.I.M. and the Jackal, with the former helping him in his secret experiments and the latter eventually betraying him upon learning Smythe intends to find a way to control the invading symbiotes.
- Spencer Smythe appears in Marvel Heroes.
- Spencer Smythe appears in the Nintendo 3DS version of The Amazing Spider-Man.
