= Harry Osborn =

Marvel Comics supervillain

- A.I. Harry Osborn as Kindred; Art by Mark Bagley.

Publication information
- Publisher: Marvel Comics
- First appearance: As Harry Osborn: The Amazing Spider-Man #31 (December 1965); As Green Goblin: The Amazing Spider-Man #136 (September 1974); As A.I. Harry Osborn: Spider-Man: Legacy of Evil #1 (April 1996); As American Son: The Amazing Spider-Man #597 (August 2009); As Harry Lyman: The Amazing Spider-Man #759 (January 2016); As Kindred: The Amazing Spider-Man #802 (September 2018)
- Created by: Stan Lee (writer); Steve Ditko (artist)

In-story information
- Full name: Harold Theopolis "Harry" Osborn
- Species: Human mutate
- Place of origin: New York City
- Team affiliations: Oscorp; Parker Industries; Alchemax
- Supporting character of: Spider-Man
- Notable aliases: Green Goblin; Hobgoblin; American Son; Harry Lyman; Kindred; New Goblin; Venom (Ultimate Spider-Man, Marvel's Spider-Man 2)
- Abilities: Goblin Formula granting: Superhuman strength, speed, stamina, agility, durability, and reflexes; Regenerative healing factor; Genius intellect; Equipments include an armor, bombs, razor sharp bats, and a glider

Harold Theopolis "Harry" Osborn is a character appearing in American comic books published by Marvel Comics, commonly in association with the superhero Spider-Man. Created by Stan Lee and Steve Ditko, the character first appeared in The Amazing Spider-Man #31 (December 1965).

Harry is the best friend of Peter Parker (Spider-Man's alter ego) and Flash Thompson, one of the ex-boyfriends of Mary Jane Watson, the son of Norman Osborn, the husband of Liz Allan and the father of Normie Osborn and Stanley Osborn. He is the second character to assume the Green Goblin alias while one of his clones was amongst the many users of the Iron Patriot armor as the superhero American Son. An artificial intelligence (A.I.) copy, known as the A.I. Harry Osborn, is also the creator of the clones Gabriel and Sarah who are both later revealed to be operating as his demonic revenant Kindred under the Harry A.I.'s command.

The character has appeared in many adaptations of Spider-Man outside of the comic books, including various cartoons and video games. James Franco portrayed the character in Sam Raimi's Spider-Man film trilogy (2002–2007), and Dane DeHaan portrays the character in The Amazing Spider-Man 2 (2014).

== Publication history ==
Harry Osborn first appeared in The Amazing Spider-Man #31 (December 1965), and was created by writer Stan Lee and artist Steve Ditko.

In The Amazing Spider-Man #122 (July 1973), Harry's father, Norman, is killed off, and a subplot leading to Harry inheriting his father's identity as the Green Goblin is introduced. This subplot culminates in The Amazing Spider-Man #136 (September 1974). Writer Gerry Conway said that the idea of Harry Osborn becoming the Green Goblin stemmed in part from a desire to deal with the consequences of the psychedelic drugs Harry began using in The Amazing Spider-Man #96 (May 1971). Conway said that he had experience with such drugs himself, and that "with psychedelic drugs, hallucinogens, if they've been misused, there is a potential for additional hallucinogenic experiences that are completely beyond your control or volition. I could imagine Harry getting hit by something like that, in the fragile emotional state following the death of his father, and losing touch with reality, as a result. Besides, I never had any intention of getting rid of the Green Goblin as a concept forever, so it all came together".

Harry dies in The Spectacular Spider-Man #200 (May 1993). Artist Sal Buscema said that drawing the final two pages of this issue was a deeply emotional experience for him due to how long he had drawn the character, and felt it was appropriate that writer J. M. DeMatteis chose not to add any dialogue to those pages.

Several years later, the Spider-Man writers made plans to reveal that the mysterious villain Gaunt was Harry Osborn, who was still alive and had orchestrated the "Clone Saga", but an editorial edict prevented this from coming to fruition. However, Harry was eventually revived in The Amazing Spider-Man #545 (December 2007). It is later revealed that this Harry was a clone, with the original remaining dead.

== Fictional character biography ==
Harry is the only son of Norman Osborn and Emily Lyman. The circumstances of Harry's birth weaken Emily, and she dies after a long illness. Heartbroken, Norman becomes a cold and unloving father; Norman either contemptuously dismisses Harry or lashes out at him in fury. As a result, Harry spends much of his life trying desperately to earn his father's approval. Unbeknownst to him, Norman traded his son's soul to the demon Mephisto in exchange for wealth and power, and Harry would be cursed for the rest of his life while Norman forgot the deal.

Upon graduating from high school, Harry enrolls in Empire State University. Among the wealthiest students in the school, Harry soon becomes one of the most popular as well, despite his aloof manner. He has a clique of rich, popular students around him; one of these is Gwen Stacy. Gwen is intrigued by a new student: Peter Parker. Harry takes a dislike to Peter as Peter’s “cold shoulder” towards everyone reminds him of his own father’s behavior. He resents the attention Gwen pays to Peter, and he assumes that Peter's standoffishness is snobbery. After confronting Parker, Harry realizes that Peter is merely shy and is also worried about his ailing aunt May Parker. Despite this rocky start, Harry and Peter became best friends, eventually sharing an apartment.

Harry does not realize that his best friend is the superhero Spider-Man, nor that his father is the supervillain Green Goblin in an accident while attempting to create a super-serum. Moreover, before he became friends with Harry, Spider-Man was unmasked and captured by the Goblin. During the subsequent battle, an electric shock removed all memory of being the Goblin from Norman's mind. Spider-Man then hid all evidence of Norman's double identity, to keep Harry from being hurt by the revelation.

However, Norman's Goblin persona resurfaces from time to time. These are difficult times for Harry, as his father's periodic episodes are unexplainable. He had experimented with drugs in his teens; but he escalates his usage, as well as trying ever-harder substances. This affects his mental stability and his relationships with his friends. Spider-Man uses this to his advantage during one battle with the Goblin; he is able to stop the fight by showing Norman his son's emaciated condition, brought on by an accidental drug overdose. The sight shocks Norman so much that it brings him back to sanity.

Harry Osborn as the second Green Goblin, battling Spider-Man on the cover of The Amazing Spider-Man #136 by John Romita, Sr.

Harry is dumped by Mary Jane Watson due to being fed up with his self-destructive lifestyle. Disconsolate, Harry turns to drugs and overdoses on amphetamines. He recovers at home instead of at a hospital, as Norman wanted to keep the matter quiet, and a doctor diagnoses him with schizophrenia. After Norman is supposedly killed, Harry swears vengeance and confronts Peter as the second Green Goblin.

Not wanting to hurt Harry, Peter avoids fighting his old friend. After Spider-Man thwarts Harry's initial attempt on his life, Harry is knocked unconscious and taken into police custody. Harry is put in the care of psychologist Bart Hamilton who extracts information from Harry through hypnosis. Hamilton then raids one of Harry's hideouts as the third Green Goblin. Harry is released and considered cured, sustaining a concussion that makes him forget his knowledge of Spider-Man's identity.

For a while, Harry's life seems back on track; his company begins turning profits once more, and he develops a romance with Liz Allan after they meet at the wedding of Betty Brant and Ned Leeds. Not long after the two are married, and eventually they have a son, Normie Osborn, who is named after Norman.

This tranquility is shattered when the aftereffects of the "Inferno" event break the barrier between Harry's conscious and subconscious minds. Once again, he remembers being the Goblin and his hatred of Spider-Man. Harry convinces himself that Peter resents the Osborns' "stable family life" due to never having been wanted by his own parents or guardians, when in fact it was the opposite. Harry takes a new version of the Goblin Formula and attacks Spider-Man, but dies from the formula's effects.

Following Harry's death, two digital versions of him appear: one was created by Harry himself, while the other was created by the Scrier cabal to manipulate Normie.

It is later revealed that Harry's soul is tortured in Hell, where he is labelled as the Goblin Prince by Mephisto until Doctor Strange frees him.

=== Harry Lyman ===
After manipulations of the timeline, a "genetic duplicate" maintains a life on Earth to fool anyone as details of Harry's death are seemingly retconned as being faked by Mysterio and his father who spirits his son away to Europe where he is held prisoner in several "rehab" clinics and he was alive all along and Peter simply did not know. Harry ends up engaged to Menace (Lily Hollister), which ultimately culminated in a son, Stanley. Harry also uses the American Son armor in order to fight against his estranged father, and has a showdown with Gabriel Stacy.

As of the All-New, All-Different Marvel branding, he legally changed his name to Harry Lyman based on his mother's maiden name as he now works at Parker Industries, and deals with the Osborn family estrangement while reuniting with Emily. During the fight against Kindred, Harry learns that he's a clone before he aids Spider-Man and saves Norman to which he ends up fatally wounded, collapsing into Peter's arms and dies. Peter and Mary Jane later grieve the loss of their friend.

== Powers and abilities ==
For most of his life, Harry Osborn had no superhuman abilities.

=== As Green Goblin ===
After exposing himself to his father's formula, he takes the reins of the second Green Goblin, causing him to become much stronger, cunning and agile. The glider he carries has swords, along with usual Goblin technology.

=== As American Son ===
Harry's clone also had temporary access to the American Son armor.

=== Harry A.I/Kindred ===
When the Harry Osborn A.I. created the Kindred twins, the assistance of Mephisto bestowed the twins with the demonically-enhanced capabilities of immortality, super-strength, and control over the centipedes like the ones that can protrude out of them. In addition, they can perform magic and revive the dead.

== Reception ==
=== Accolades ===
- In 2014, IGN ranked Harry Osborn 6th in their "Top 25 Spider-Man Villains" list.
- In 2020, CBR.com ranked Harry Osborn 6th in their "Spider-Man: 10 Most Powerful Members Of The Osborn Family" list.
- In 2021, Screen Rant included Harry Osborn in their "10 Best Marvel Legacy Villains Who Lived Up To Their Predecessor" list and in their "15 Most Powerful Variants Of Green Goblin In Marvel Comics" list.
- In 2022, CBR.com ranked Harry Osborn 2nd in their "10 Best Marvel Legacy Villains" list and 3rd in their "10 Best Versions Of Green Goblin From The Comics" list.

== Other versions ==
Many alternate universe versions of Harry Osborn have appeared throughout the character's publication history.

=== Infinity Wars ===
In Infinity Wars, Harry Osborn is a composite character incorporating elements of Werewolf by Night. This version of Harry was cursed to transform into a goblin-like creature after contracting the curse from his father Norman.

=== Spider-Man: Life Story ===
In Spider-Man: Life Story, Harry became the head of Oscorp after Norman Osborn was arrested.

=== Spider-Gwen ===
In Spider-Gwen, Harry is a social outcast who is constantly bullied due to a rumor that he tried to burn his old prep school down.

=== Ultimate Marvel ===
In Ultimate Spider-Man (2000), Harry was transformed into the Hobgoblin, an orange goblin-like creature who possesses superhuman strength and pyrokinesis.

=== Ultimate Universe ===
In Ultimate Spider-Man (2024), Harry is married to Gwen Stacy and became the head of Oscorp after his parents were killed.

== In other media ==
Harry Osborn has been adapted to other media including animated series, films, games, toys, collectibles, miscellaneous memorabilia, and has appeared as a supporting character in numerous computer and video games.

In television, the character first was featured in Fox Kids' Spider-Man: The Animated Series (1994–1998) voiced by Gary Imhoff, Spider-Man: The New Animated Series (2003) voiced by Ian Ziering, The Spectacular Spider-Man (2008–2009) voiced by James Arnold Taylor, Ultimate Spider-Man (2012–2017) voiced by Matt Lanter, and Spider-Man (2017–2020) voiced by Max Mittelman. Harry Osborn appears in the Disney+ animated series Your Friendly Neighborhood Spider-Man (2025–present), voiced by Zeno Robinson.

Harry Osborn/New Goblin was also featured in a trilogy of live-action films directed by Sam Raimi played by James Franco, and the 2014 film The Amazing Spider-Man 2 portrayed by Dane DeHaan, directed by Marc Webb.

The character appears via voicemail in the 2018 video game Spider-Man, voiced by Scott Porter. He has a non-speaking cameo appearance in the post-credits scene of its 2020 spin-off Spider-Man: Miles Morales. He returns in a more prominent role in the 2023 sequel Spider-Man 2, voiced by Graham Phillips. In this game, Harry adopts a costume similar to Agent Venom before eventually becoming this universe's version of Venom.

== Collected editions ==
Title	Material Collected	Published Date	ISBN
Amazing Spider-Man Presents: American Son	Amazing Spider-Man Presents: American Son #1-4	December 1, 2010	978-0785146872
