= List of The Amazing Spider-Man issues =

The following is a complete list of all volumes of The Amazing Spider-Man, with notes for each issue. The list is updated as of March 19, 2024.

== Amazing Fantasy #15 (August 1962) ==
This comic book plot is written by Stan Lee and illustrated by Steve Ditko. Features the first appearances of Spider-Man, Aunt May, Uncle Ben, Flash Thompson, and Liz Allan. High school student Peter Parker is bitten by a radioactive spider, thus gaining the proportionate strength, speed, and agility of a spider, along with a precognitive "spider-sense" and later creating a web-shooting device. Peter becomes Spider-Man, an instant TV sensation, but coming out of a TV studio one day, Peter does not stop an escaping burglar, claiming it is not his problem. A few days later, he comes home to find his Uncle Ben has been shot and goes to track down the murderer, only to find that it was the same burglar that he had let escape a few days earlier. Peter blames himself for his uncle's death and realizes that with great power there must also come great responsibility.

This issue was released on June 5, 1962, with a cover date of August 1962.

== The Amazing Spider-Man #1–100 (January 1963 – July 1971) ==
Issue #	Title	Author / Illustrator	Editor	Release date
1	Spider-Man / The Chameleon Strikes!	Stan Lee/Steve Ditko	Stan Lee	Jan. 1963
The first appearance of Daily Bugle editor J. Jonah Jameson and his son, astronaut John Jameson. The Bugle begins its campaign against Spider-Man.
The first meeting between Spider-Man and the Fantastic Four. The first appearance of the Chameleon, the first villain in Spider-Man's rogues gallery.
2	Duel to the Death with the Vulture! / The Uncanny Threat of the Terrible Tinkerer	Lee/Ditko	Stan Lee	March 1963
The first appearance of the original Vulture. Peter Parker begins selling photos to the Daily Bugle.
The first appearance of the Tinkerer.
3	The Strangest Foe of All Time...Doctor Octopus	Lee/Ditko	Stan Lee	May 1963
The origin and first appearance of Doctor Octopus. The second meeting between Spider-Man and the Human Torch.
4	Nothing Can Stop...the Sandman!	Lee/Ditko	Stan Lee	July 1963
The origin and first appearance of the Sandman and J. Jonah Jameson's secretary Betty Brant.
5	Marked for Destruction by Dr. Doom!	Lee/Ditko	Stan Lee	Aug. 1963
The first battle between Spider-Man and Doctor Doom. Spider-Man rescues Flash Thompson from Doom.
6	Face-to-Face with...the Lizard!	Lee/Ditko	Stan Lee	Sept. 1963
The origin and first appearance of the Lizard. The first Spider-Man story set outside New York City.
7	The Return of the Vulture	Lee/Ditko	Stan Lee	Oct. 1963
The second appearance of the original Vulture.
8	The Terrible Threat of the Living Brain! / Spider-Man Tackles the Torch!	Lee/Ditko	Stan Lee	Jan. 1964
The first appearance of the Living Brain. Peter Parker takes on Flash Thompson in a boxing match.
Spider-Man takes on the Fantastic Four in a "surprise extra" story.
9	The Man Called Electro!	Lee/Ditko	Stan Lee	Feb. 1964
The origin and first appearance of Electro. Aunt May is taken ill.
10	The Enforcers!	Lee/Ditko	Stan Lee	Mar. 1964
The first appearance of Bugle journalist-turned-mobster Frederick Foswell, a.k.a. the Big Man, and the Enforcers: Fancy Dan, Ox, and Montana. Aunt May recovers, and Betty Brant leaves New York for Pennsylvania.
11	Turning Point featuring: The Return of Dr. Octopus!	Lee/Ditko	Stan Lee	Apr. 1964
The return of Doctor Octopus. Bennett Brant, brother of Betty, is accidentally shot by a stray bullet when Spider-Man fights a mobster. Betty blames Spider-Man for her brother's death as a result.
12	Unmasked by Dr. Octopus	Lee/Ditko	Stan Lee	May 1964
After Doctor Octopus escapes from their last battle, he tries to find Spider-Man, which leads to him capturing Betty Brant. Spider-Man fights Doctor Octopus until he is defeated and unmasked to be revealed as Peter Parker. Everyone believes this to be false and Doctor Octopus escapes. Later, Spider-Man and Doctor Octopus have another fight in which Spider-Man wins.
13	The Menace of...Mysterio!	Lee/Ditko	Stan Lee	June 1964
The first appearance of the original Mysterio, who frames Spider-Man for a robbery. Mysterio is seen as a hero for exposing Spider-Man as a villain. When they fight, Mysterio blocks Spider-Man's spider-sense, and continuously defeats Spider-Man. In the end, Spider-Man defeats Mysterio.
14	The Grotesque Adventure of the Green Goblin	Lee/Ditko	Stan Lee	July 1964
The first appearance of the Green Goblin, who convinces a movie producer to make a movie with Spider-Man fighting the Enforcers and himself. While fighting in a cave, they come across the Hulk.
15	Kraven the Hunter!	Lee/Ditko	Stan Lee	Aug. 1964
The first appearance of Kraven the Hunter, who teams up with the Chameleon to try to kill Spider-Man.
16	Duel with Daredevil	Lee/Ditko	Stan Lee	Sep. 1964
Spider-Man gets hypnotized by the Ringmaster, and is ordered to fight Daredevil.
17	The Return of the Green Goblin!	Lee/Ditko	Stan Lee	Oct. 1964
Flash Thompson starts the Spider-Man Fan Club. The first appearance of the Green Goblin's now-iconic Goblin Glider.
18	The End of Spider-Man!	Lee/Ditko	Stan Lee	Nov. 1964
The first appearance of Ned Leeds. Spider-Man watches over his sick aunt, running away from the Sandman and being called a coward.
19	Spidey Strikes Back!	Lee/Ditko	Stan Lee	Dec. 1964
Spider-Man strikes back against the Sandman and the Enforcers.
20	The Coming of the Scorpion	Lee/Ditko	Stan Lee	Jan. 1965
The first appearance of the Scorpion. Dr. Farley Stillwell turns Mac Gargan into the Scorpion at the request of J.Jonah Jameson.
21	Where Flies the Beetle	Lee/Ditko	Stan Lee	Feb. 1965
The Beetle kidnaps the Human Torch's girlfriend and Spider-Man tries to rescue her, but the Torch thinks Spider-Man did it. The Torch finally catches up to the Beetle and sees that he has kidnapped Doris Evans and goes to try and catch him, with a little help from Spider-Man.
22	Preeeeeesenting...the Clown, and his Masters of Menace!	Lee/Ditko	Stan Lee	Mar. 1965
Spider-Man battles the Clown and his Masters of Menace, otherwise known as the Circus of Crime.
23	The Goblin and the Gangsters	Lee/Ditko	Stan Lee	Apr. 1965
Spider-Man battles the Green Goblin.
24	Spider-Man Goes Mad!	Lee/Ditko	Stan Lee	May 1965
The original Mysterio, under the guise of Dr. Ludwig Rinehart, tries to convince Spider-Man that he is insane.
25	Captured by J. Jonah Jameson!	Lee/Ditko	Stan Lee	June 1965
The first appearance of Professor Spencer Smythe and the first Spider-Slayer. The first appearance of Mary Jane Watson (face obscured).
26	The Man in the Crime-Master's Mask	Lee/Ditko	Stan Lee	July 1965
The first appearance of the original Crime-Master and Patch the Stool Pigeon.
27	Bring Back My Goblin to Me!	Lee/Ditko	Stan Lee	Aug. 1965
The death of the original Crime-Master; Patch revealed to be Frederick Foswell.
28	The Menace of the Molten Man	Lee/Ditko	Stan Lee	Sep. 1965
The first appearance of the Molten Man; Peter Parker's graduation from Midtown High.
29	Never Step on a Scorpion	Lee/Ditko	Stan Lee	Oct. 1965
Spider-Man battles the Scorpion.
30	The Claws of the Cat	Lee/Ditko	Stan Lee	Nov. 1965
Spider-Man battles the Cat.
31	If This Be My Destiny...!	Lee/Ditko	Stan Lee	Dec. 1965
The first appearances of Harry Osborn, Gwen Stacy, and Professor Miles Warren. Peter Parker starts college. First part of a three-part story.
32	Man on a Rampage	Lee/Ditko	Stan Lee	Jan. 1966
Aunt May is in the hospital with radiation poisoning in her blood due to a blood transfusion from Peter. Second part of a three-part story.
33	The Final Chapter	Lee/Ditko	Stan Lee	Feb. 1966
Spider-Man must escape after being pinned under heavy machinery in order to get the antidote to Aunt May. Third part of a three-part story.
34	The Thrill of the Hunt!	Lee/Ditko	Stan Lee	Mar. 1966
Spider-Man battles Kraven the Hunter.
35	The Molten Man Regrets	Lee/Ditko	Stan Lee	Apr. 1966
Spider-Man battles the Molten Man.
36	When Falls the Meteor	Lee/Ditko	Stan Lee	May 1966
The first appearance of the Looter.
37	Once Upon a Time, There Was a Robot...!	Lee/Ditko	Stan Lee	June 1966
Professor Mendell Stromm creates two robots that Spider-Man must battle. The first appearance of Norman Osborn.
38	Just a Guy named Joe	Lee/Ditko	Stan Lee	July 1966
The last issue with Steve Ditko's artwork.
39	How Green Was My Goblin	Lee/John Romita Sr.	Stan Lee	Aug. 1966
The Green Goblin is revealed to be Norman Osborn. The Green Goblin discovers Spider-Man's identity.
40	Spidey Saves the Day! featuring: The End of the Green Goblin	Lee/Romita Sr.	Stan Lee	Sept. 1966
The Green Goblin gets amnesia, forgets Spider-Man's identity, and returns to his life as Norman Osborn.
41	The Horns of the Rhino	Lee/Romita Sr.	Stan Lee	Oct. 1966
The first appearance of the Rhino.
42	The Birth of a Superhero	Lee/Romita Sr.	Stan Lee	Nov. 1966
John Jameson, whose mind is clouded by space spores, calls himself Colonel Jupiter and fights Spider-Man. The first full appearance of Mary Jane Watson.
43	Rhino on the Rampage	Lee/Romita Sr.	Stan Lee	Dec. 1966
Spider-Man battles the Rhino once more after the Rhino breaks out of jail.
44	Where Crawls the Lizard	Lee/Romita Sr.	Stan Lee	Nov. 1966
The return of the Lizard.
45	Spidey Smashes Out	Lee/Romita Sr.	Stan Lee	Dec. 1966
Spider-Man's battle with the Lizard concludes.
46	The Sinister Shocker	Lee/Romita Sr.	Stan Lee	Jan. 1967
The first appearance of the Shocker. Peter Parker moves in with Harry Osborn.
47	In the Hands of the Hunter	Lee/Romita Sr.	Stan Lee	Feb. 1967
Return of Kraven the Hunter.
Note: Deadpool #11 intersects this story, with Deadpool disguising himself as Peter Parker and Blind Al disguising herself as Aunt May. Parts of the issue were drawn over Amazing Spider-Man #47, resulting in a Forrest Gump-type insertion of Deadpool and Blind Al. It is unknown whether the events in Deadpool #11 remain in canon, though the story ended the same way as Amazing Spider-Man #47 did.
48	The Wings of the Vulture!	Lee/Romita Sr.	Stan Lee	March 1967
The first appearance of the second Vulture.
49	From the Depths of Defeat!	Lee/Romita Sr.	Stan Lee	April 1967
Kraven and the second Vulture team up to battle Spider-Man.
50	Spider-Man No More!	Lee/Romita Sr.	Stan Lee	May 1967
Peter Parker decides to give up his Spider-Man identity once and for all and throws away his costume. He resumes crime-fighting when he remembers that he is fighting for his Uncle Ben. The first appearance of the Kingpin. Johnny Carson and Ed McMahon make cameos.
51	In the Clutches of...the Kingpin!	Lee/Romita Sr.	Stan Lee	June 1967
Frederick Foswell joins the Kingpin instead of trying to take over as the head of the mob. The Kingpin kidnaps J. Jonah Jameson. The first appearance of Joe Robertson.
52	To Die a Hero!	Lee/Romita Sr.	Stan Lee	July 1967
The Kingpin story arc concluded. Frederick Foswell dies a hero by being shot while defending J. Jonah Jameson.
53	Enter: Dr. Octopus	Lee/Romita Sr.	Stan Lee	Aug. 1967
Doctor Octopus returns to steal the Nullifier. He sets a trap for Spider-Man and believes he has killed him.
54	The Tentacles and the Trap!	Lee/Romita Sr.	Stan Lee	Sept. 1967
Doctor Octopus becomes a boarder at Aunt May's house. Spider-Man battles him, but Aunt May suffers a heart attack.
55	Doc Ock Wins!	Lee/Romita Sr.	Stan Lee	Oct. 1967
Doctor Octopus steals the Nullifier and uses it on Spider-Man, causing him to forget who he is.
56	Disaster!	Lee/Romita Sr.	Stan Lee	Nov. 1967
Having lost his memory, Spider-Man helps Doctor Octopus. The first appearance of Captain George Stacy.
57	The Coming of Ka-Zar!	Lee/Romita Sr.	Stan Lee	Dec. 1967
Spider-Man battles Ka-Zar. At the end of the issue, Spider-Man's memory returns.
58	To Kill a Spider-Man!	Lee/Romita Sr.	Stan Lee	Jan. 1968
The first appearance of the second Spider-Slayer.
59	The Brand of the Brainwasher!	Lee/Romita Sr.	Stan Lee	Feb. 1968
Mary Jane Watson gets a dancing gig at a club, but the club is, in fact, a trap to brainwash important individuals. Spider-Man discovers that the Kingpin is behind it all. The first appearance of Mary Jane Watson on the cover of an issue.
60	O, Bitter Victory	Lee/Romita Sr.	Stan Lee	March 1968
Spider-Man battles the Kingpin, who has brainwashed Captain Stacy.
61	What A Tangled Web We Weave!	Lee/Romita Sr.	Stan Lee	April 1968
Captain Stacy realizes he has been brainwashed. The Kingpin captures Captain Stacy and Gwen as a trap for Spider-Man. Spider-Man saves them from being crushed, but the Kingpin escapes.
62	Make Way for...Medusa!	Lee/Romita Sr.	Stan Lee	May 1968
Spider-Man battles Medusa, one of the Inhumans.
63	Wings in the Night	Lee/Romita Sr.	Stan Lee	June 1968
The original Vulture is revealed to be still alive. He steals a second set of wings and frees the second Vulture (Blackie Drago) from prison. The two Vultures battle it out and Drago is humiliatingly defeated.
64	The Vulture's Prey	Lee/Romita Sr.	Stan Lee	July 1968
Part 2; Spider-Man battles the original Vulture.
65	The Impossible Escape!	Lee/Romita Sr.	Stan Lee	Aug. 1968
Injured from his battle with the original Vulture, Spider-Man is taken to the prison infirmary, but the police do not unmask him. When a riot breaks out, Spider-Man saves Captain Stacy.
66	The Madness of Mysterio!	Lee/Romita Sr.	Stan Lee	Sept. 1968
The original Mysterio lures Spider-Man into a trap.
67	To Squash a Spider!	Lee/Romita Sr.	Stan Lee	Oct. 1968
The original Mysterio makes Spider-Man believe he has been shrunk down to six inches tall. The first appearance of Randy Robertson.
68	Crisis on the Campus	Lee/Romita Sr.	Stan Lee	Nov. 1968
The Kingpin uses a campus demonstration as a diversion to steal an ancient clay tablet.
69	Mission: Crush the Kingpin!	Lee/Romita Sr.	Stan Lee	Dec. 1968
Spider-Man battles the Kingpin and retrieves the tablet.
70	Spider-Man Wanted!	Lee/Romita Sr.	Stan Lee	Jan. 1969
While the Kingpin escapes from prison, Spider-Man is sought as his accomplice.
71	The Speedster and the Spider!	Lee/Romita Sr.	Stan Lee	Feb. 1969
Spider-Man battles Quicksilver.
72	Rocked by...the Shocker!	Lee/Romita Sr.	Stan Lee	March 1969
The return of Shocker, who steals the tablet from the Stacys. Spider-Man defeats him, but the tablet is missing.
73	The Web Closes!	Lee/Romita Sr./John Buscema	Stan Lee	April 1969
Spider-Man tracks the tablet to the Shocker's girlfriend, but he is overcome by Man Mountain Marko, who brings it to Silvermane. Dr. Connors is kidnapped to unlock the secrets of the tablet.
74	If This Be Bedlam!	Lee/Romita Sr.	Stan Lee	May 1969
Silvermane drinks a potion made by Dr. Connors according to the tablet and becomes younger.
75	Death Without Warning!	Lee/Romita Sr.	Stan Lee	June 1969
Silvermane's potion backfires, as he continues to grow younger until he disappears. Dr. Connors becomes the Lizard again.
76	The Lizard Lives!	Lee/Buscema	Stan Lee	July 1969
Spider-Man battles the Lizard. During their battle, the Human Torch shows up.
77	In the Blaze of Battle!	Lee/Romita Sr./Buscema	Stan Lee	Aug. 1969
The Human Torch joins the fight against the Lizard, although Spider-Man fears he may injure Dr. Connors.
78	The Night of the Prowler!	Lee/Romita Sr./Buscema	Stan Lee	Sept. 1969
The first appearance of the Prowler.
79	To Prowl No More!	Lee/Buscema	Stan Lee	Oct. 1969
The story arc with the Prowler concludes. After Spider-Man unmasks the Prowler, he listens to his story and decides to let him go.
80	On the Trail of...the Chameleon!	Lee/Romita Sr./Buscema	Stan Lee	Nov. 1969
The return of the Chameleon.
81	The Coming of the Kangaroo!	Lee/Romita Sr./Buscema	Stan Lee	Dec. 1969
Spider-Man battles the Kangaroo.
82	And Then Came Electro!	Lee/Romita Sr.	Stan Lee	Jan. 1970
The return of Electro.
83	The Schemer!	Lee/Romita Sr.	Stan Lee	Feb. 1970
The first appearances of the Schemer and Vanessa Fisk, the Kingpin's wife.
84	The Kingpin Strikes Back!	Lee/Romita Sr./Buscema	Stan Lee	March 1970
Spider-Man battles the Kingpin.
85	The Secret of the Schemer!	Lee/Romita Sr./Buscema	Stan Lee	April 1970
Spider-Man battles the Kingpin and the Schemer. The Schemer is revealed to be Richard Fisk, the Kingpin's son.
86	Beware...the Black Widow!	Lee/Romita Sr.	Stan Lee	May 1970
Spider-Man battles the Black Widow
87	Unmasked at Last!	Lee/Romita Sr.	Stan Lee	June 1970
Peter Parker reveals to his friends that he is Spider-Man. None of them believe him, as they think that he is ill, which he actually is. After he recovers, Peter gets the Prowler to impersonate Spider-Man so that his friends can be completely convinced that he is not Spider-Man.
88	The Arms of Doctor Octopus!	Lee/Romita Sr.	Stan Lee	July 1970
Spider-Man battles Doctor Octopus's mechanical tentacles.
89	Doc Ock Lives!	Lee/Gil Kane	Stan Lee	Aug. 1970
The return of Doctor Octopus.
90	And Death Shall Come!	Lee/Kane	Stan Lee	Sept. 1970
Captain George Stacy dies when a pile of bricks fall on him due to Doctor Octopus's arms flailing around in a fight with Spider-Man. Spider-Man gets a last moment with Stacy up on the rooftop of a building, where Stacy tells Peter Parker to take care of his daughter Gwen. Spider-Man is largely blamed for Stacy's death.
91	To Smash the Spider!	Lee/Kane	Stan Lee	Oct. 1970
The first appearance of Sam Bullit. After her father's death, Gwen Stacy visits Bullit, who is in a campaign against masked heroes, and offers to help him win his election. Gwen hates Spider-Man and blames him for the death of her father.
92	When Iceman Attacks	Lee/Kane	Stan Lee	Nov. 1970
Spider-Man battles the Iceman.
93	The Lady and...the Prowler!	Lee/Romita Sr.	Stan Lee	Dec. 1970
The Prowler believes that Spider-Man is responsible for Stacy's death after having the Prowler dress up as Spider-Man and show up at Stacy's house in issue #87. Spider-Man ends up defeating the Prowler and delivering him to the hospital, and after returning to Gwen's house, he finds out that she has left for London to live with her aunt and uncle.
94	On Wings of Death!	Lee/Romita Sr.	Stan Lee	Jan. 1971
The Beetle takes Aunt May as a hostage at the general store. Spider-Man confronts the Beetle and saves Aunt May.
95	Trap for a Terrorist!	Lee/Romita Sr.	Stan Lee	Feb. 1971
Spider-Man fights in London.
96	...And Now, the Goblin!	Lee/Kane	Stan Lee	March 1971
Drug issues part 1; not approved by the Comics Code Authority. Peter Parker takes up a job at Norman Osborn's chemistry lab. Osborn discovers a Green Goblin costume in a storage closet and once again becomes the Green Goblin.
97	In the Grip of the Goblin!	Lee/Romita Sr./Kane	Stan Lee	April 1971
Drug issues part 2; not approved by the Comics Code Authority. Spider-Man battles the Green Goblin. Harry Osborn's drug habit leads to a complete breakdown.
98	The Goblin's Last Gasp!	Lee/Kane	Stan Lee	May 1971
Drug issues part 3; not approved by the Comics Code Authority. Spider-Man forces Norman Osborn/the Green Goblin to see his ailing son and Osborn once again returns to normal.
99	A Day in the Life of... (featuring: Panic in the Prison)	Lee/Kane	Stan Lee	June 1971
Spider-Man intervenes in a prison riot. The first appearance of Turpo (a prisoner)
100	The Spider or the Man?	Lee/Kane	Stan Lee	July 1971
After taking a serum of his own creation that is meant to eliminate his spider-powers, Spider-Man instead accidentally grows four extra arms.

== The Amazing Spider-Man #101–200 (August 1971 – November 1979) ==
Issue #	Title	Author / Illustrator	Editor	Release date
101	A Monster Called...Morbius!	Roy Thomas/Gil Kane	Stan Lee	Aug. 1971
Spider-Man flees to the Long Island home of Dr. Curt Connors to eliminate his four extra arms. The first appearance of Morbius the Living Vampire.
102	Vampire at Large!	Thomas/Kane	Stan Lee	Sept. 1971
Spider-Man and the Lizard battle Morbius and Spider-Man regains his original two arms.
103	Walk the Savage Land!	Thomas/Kane	Stan Lee	Oct. 1971
Peter Parker, Gwen Stacy and J.Jonah Jameson travel to the Savage Land to find a strange beast and encounter Ka-Zar. The first appearance of Gog, which is being controlled by Kraven the Hunter.
104	The Beauty and the Brute	Thomas/Kane	Stan Lee	Nov. 1971
Spider-Man and Ka-Zar defeat Gog and Kraven the Hunter.
105	The Spider Slayer!	Stan Lee/Kane	Stan Lee	Dec. 1971
J.J. Jameson commissions a third Spider-Slayer from Spencer Smythe.
106	Squash! Goes the Spider!	Lee/John Romita Sr.	Stan Lee	Jan. 1972
Spider-Man's face is revealed to a group of criminals in league with Professor Spencer Smythe. To throw them off, he creates a mask of his face and removes it when he knows they are watching, revealing his Spider-Man mask.
107	Spidey Smashes Thru!	Lee/Romita Sr.	Stan Lee	Feb. 1972
Spider-Man defeats the third Spider-Slayer and Professor Spencer Smythe.
108	Vengeance from Vietnam!	Lee/Romita Sr.	Stan Lee	March 1972
The first appearances of the Giant One and the monks of the Hidden Temple. Flash Thompson is kidnapped by monks from Vietnam.
109	Enter: Doctor Strange!	Lee/Romita Sr.	Stan Lee	April 1972
Doctor Strange helps Spider-Man save Flash.
110	The Birth of...the Gibbon!	Lee/Romita Sr.	Stan Lee	May 1972
The first appearance of the Gibbon. Aunt May disappears.
111	To Stalk a Spider!	Gerry Conway/Romita Sr.	Stan Lee	June 1972
The Gibbon is drugged by Kraven the Hunter so that he will fight Spider-Man.
112	Spidey Cops Out!	Conway/Romita Sr.	Roy Thomas	July 1972
Spider-Man is preoccupied by Aunt May's disappearance. He comes across a new underworld group run by Doctor Octopus.
113	They Call the Doctor...Octopus!	Conway/Romita Sr.	Roy Thomas	Aug. 1972
The first appearance of Hammerhead. Doctor Octopus and Hammerhead battle for control of the city's underworld.
114	Gang War, Schmang War! What I Want to Know Is...Who the Heck is Hammerhead?	Conway/Romita Sr.	Roy Thomas	Sept. 1972
The battle between Hammerhead and Doctor Octopus continues. Aunt May is revealed to be staying at Dr. Octopus's mansion.
115	The Last Battle!	Conway/Romita Sr.	Roy Thomas	Oct. 1972
Doctor Octopus defeats Hammerhead. Aunt May shoots at Spider-Man to protect Doctor Octopus.
116	Suddenly...the Smasher!	Lee/Conway/Romita Sr.	Roy Thomas	Nov. 1972
Spider-Man faces off against mayoral candidate Richard Raleigh, Dr. Thaxton and the Smasher. The story is a revised version of the Man-Monster tale in Spectacular Spider-Man magazine #1 (July 1968).
117	The Deadly Designs of the Disruptor!	Lee/Conway/Romita Sr.	Roy Thomas	Dec. 1972
The story continues. The first appearance of the Disruptor.
118	Countdown to Chaos!	Lee/Conway/Romita Sr.	Roy Thomas	Jan. 1973
The story concludes. The Disruptor's identity is revealed as Richard Raleigh.
119	The Gentleman's Name is...Hulk!	Conway/Romita Sr.	Roy Thomas	Feb. 1973
Spider-Man travels to Canada to speak with a lawyer about a telegram sent to Aunt May. He battles the Hulk (part 1).
120	The Fight and the Fury	Conway/Kane	Roy Thomas	March 1973
Spider-Man battles the Hulk (part 2).
121	The Night Gwen Stacy Died	Conway/Kane/Romita Sr.	Roy Thomas	April 1973
In this landmark issue, the Green Goblin regains his memory and kills Gwen Stacy.
122	The Goblin's Last Stand	Conway/Kane/Romita Sr.	Roy Thomas	May 1973
The death of the Green Goblin/Norman Osborn. He remains dead for 23 years (real time).
123	...Just a Man Called...Cage!	Conway/Kane/Romita Sr.	Roy Thomas	June 1973
Luke Cage is hired by J. Jonah Jameson to eliminate Spider-Man.
124	The Mark of the Man-Wolf	Conway/Kane	Roy Thomas	July 1973
Spider-Man battles Jameson's son John, who has become the Man-Wolf.
125	Wolfhunt!	Conway/Ross Andru	Roy Thomas	Aug. 1973
The Man-Wolf story concludes.
126	The Kangaroo Bounces Back!	Conway/Andru	Roy Thomas	Sept. 1973
The Kangaroo is given superpowers by Jonas Harrow, but is killed while battling Spider-Man. The first mention of the Spider-Mobile that Spider-Man is building with the help of the Human Torch. In the epilogue, Harry Osborn is revealed to be the person who took the Green Goblin costume off his father's body; he decides to become the second Green Goblin.
127	The Dark Wings of Death!	Conway/Andru	Roy Thomas	Oct. 1973
The first appearance of the third Vulture.
128	The Vulture Hangs High!	Conway/Andru	Roy Thomas	Nov. 1973
The battle with the third Vulture concludes.
129	The Punisher Strikes Twice!	Conway/Andru	Roy Thomas	Dec. 1973
The first appearance of both the Punisher and the Jackal.
130	Betrayed!	Conway/Andru	Roy Thomas	Jan. 1974
Spider-Man battles Hammerhead. The first appearance of the Spider-Mobile.
131	My Uncle...My Enemy?	Conway/Andru	Roy Thomas	Feb. 1974
Doctor Octopus attempts to marry Aunt May, who is to inherit a Canadian island rich in uranium. The apparent death of both Doctor Octopus and Hammerhead when a nuclear breeder on the island explodes.
132	The Master Plan of the Molten Man!	Conway/Romita Sr./Paul Reinman	Roy Thomas	March 1974
Liz Allan reappears after a 102-issue absence.
133	The Molten Man Breaks Out!	Conway/Andru	Roy Thomas	April 1974
The Molten Man is revealed to be Liz Allan's step-brother, Mark Raxton. The apparent first death of the Molten Man.
134	Danger Is a Man Named...Tarantula!	Conway/Andru	Roy Thomas	May 1974
The first appearance of the Tarantula. Harry finds out that Peter Parker is Spider-Man when he sees him swing out of the apartment window.
135	Shoot-Out in Central Park!	Conway/Andru	Roy Thomas	June 1974
The Punisher returns and faces off against the Tarantula and his henchmen Hidalgo and Juan. Harry Osborn finds Peter's costume and mask on Peter's dresser.
136	The Green Goblin Lives Again!	Conway/Andru	Roy Thomas	July 1974
The first appearance of Harry Osborn as the second Green Goblin.
137	Death-Trap Times Three!	Conway/Andru	Roy Thomas	Aug. 1974
The second part of the Harry Osborn as the second Green Goblin story.
138	Madness Means...the Mindworm!	Conway/Andru	Roy Thomas	Sept. 1974
The first appearance of Mindworm.
139	Day of the Grizzly!	Conway/Andru	Roy Thomas	Oct. 1974
The first appearance of Grizzly.
140	And One Will Fall!	Conway/Andru	Roy Thomas	Nov. 1974
The first appearance of Gloria Grant. Spider-Man battles Grizzly and Jackal.
141	The Man's Name Appears to be...Mysterio!	Conway/Andru	Roy Thomas	Dec. 1974
The first appearance of the second Mysterio (Daniel Berkhart). Spider-Man drives the Spider-Mobile off a dock and into the ocean.
142	Dead Man's Bluff!	Conway/Andru	Len Wein	Jan. 1975
The first appearance of Gwen Stacy's clone.
143	...And the Wind Cries: Cyclone!	Conway/Andru	Len Wein	Feb. 1975
Peter and Robbie Robertson travel to Paris to save J. Jonah Jameson. The first appearance of Cyclone. The first kiss between Peter and MJ.
144	The Delusion Conspiracy	Conway/Andru	Len Wein	March 1975
Spider-Man defeats Cyclone. Gwen Stacy's clone meets Peter Parker.
145	Gwen Stacy Is Alive and...Well...?!	Conway/Andru	Len Wein	April 1975
Gwen Stacy's clone part 2. Spider-Man battles the Scorpion.
146	Scorpion...Where is thy Sting?	Conway/Andru	Len Wein	May 1975
Gwen Stacy's clone part 3. The Scorpion resumes his battle with Spider-Man.
147	The Tarantula Is a Very Deadly Beast!	Conway/Andru	Len Wein	June 1975
Gwen Stacy's clone part 4. Spider-Man battles the Tarantula. In a recreation of Gwen Stacy's death, Spider-Man is thrown off the Brooklyn Bridge by the Jackal.
148	Jackal, Jackal...Who's Got the Jackal?	Conway/Andru	Len Wein	July 1975
Spider-Man defeats Tarantula. The Jackal is revealed to be Professor Miles Warren, Peter Parker's biology teacher.
149	Even if I Live, I Die!	Conway/Andru	Marv Wolfman	Aug. 1975
The first appearance of the Spider-Man clone. The clone and Professor Warren/the Jackal appear to die at the end of the issue.
150	Spider-Man...or Spider-Clone?	Archie Goodwin/Kane	Len Wein	Sept. 1975
Spider-Man goes to Dr. Connors to do tests to see if he is the clone. He is attacked by Vulture, Sandman, and Kingpin, but these are just robots created by Spencer Smythe, who attacks with the third Spider-Slayer. Spider-Man defeats him and proves to himself that he is not the clone because, despite he and the clone having the same memories, he has feelings for Mary Jane, which could only be based on shared experiences after the death of Gwen Stacy; thus, he must be the real thing. Spider-Man defeats Smythe and decides not to read Connors' lab report.
151	Skirmish Beneath the Streets!	Len Wein/Andru/Romita Sr.	Len Wein	Oct. 1975
Spider-Man disposes of his clone in a factory smokestack. He battles the Shocker. Harry Osborn is released from the psychiatric institution.
152	Shattered by the Shocker!	Wein/Andru	Len Wein	Nov. 1975
Spider-Man defeats the Shocker. Doctor Octopus (his identity is revealed in issue #156) reappears as a homeless person pursued by an unseen adversary.
153	The Longest Hundred Yards!	Wein/Andru	Len Wein	Dec. 1975
The first appearance of Paine. Former football star and computer scientist Bradley Bolton is blackmailed by Paine (working for an unknown group; eventually revealed to be led by the Kingpin in issue #163) to hand over a component to the Worldwide Habitual Offenders (W.H.O.) computer. Spider-Man arrives too late to save Bolton.
154	The Sandman Always Strikes Twice!	Wein/Sal Buscema	Len Wein	Jan. 1976
The Sandman is liberated by a group of criminals (see issue #153) whose unseen leader (the Kingpin) forces him to steal a cryogenics mechanism. He is defeated by Spider-Man.
155	Whodunit!	Wein/Buscema	Len Wein	Feb. 1976
The first appearance of Leroy Tallon. Spider-Man attempts to solve the mystery of who murdered Dr. Armstrong Smith, designer of the Worldwide Habitual Offenders (W.H.O.) computer. The killer is revealed to be the computer itself.
156	On a Clear Day You Can See...the Mirage!	Wein/Andru	Len Wein	March 1976
Ned Leeds and Betty Brant get married. Spider-Man battles the Mirage (in his first appearance). The return of Doctor Octopus (the last panel of the last page).
157	The Ghost that Haunted Octopus!	Wein/Andru	Len Wein	April 1976
Doctor Octopus is stalked by the ghost of Hammerhead.
158	Hammerhead is Out!	Wein/Andru	Len Wein	May 1976
In an attempt to eliminate Hammerhead's ghost, Doctor Octopus unwittingly re-materializes him.
159	Arm-In-Arm-In-Arm-In-Arm-In-Arm-In-Arm with Doctor Octopus	Wein/Andru	Len Wein	June 1976
Spider-Man and Doctor Octopus join forces to fight Hammerhead and rescue Aunt May. The Tinkerer returns (identity revealed in issue #160), with the rebuilt Spider-Mobile.
160	My Killer, the Car!	Wein/Andru	Len Wein	July 1976
The Tinkerer attempts to capture Spider-Man with the rebuilt Spider-Mobile. J. Jonah Jameson receives photos of Spider-Man (revealed in issue #161, the photos show Spider-Man unmasking his clone and disposing of him in a factory smokestack).
161	..And the Nightcrawler Came Prowling, Prowling...	Wein/Andru	Len Wein	Aug. 1976
Spider-Man and Nightcrawler mistakenly battle over a series of sniper deaths. The Punisher returns.
162	Let the Punisher Fit the Crime!	Wein/Andru	Len Wein	Sept. 1976
The first appearance of Jigsaw. Spider-Man, Nightcrawler, and the Punisher join forces to defeat Jigsaw. The first appearance of Dr. Marla Madison.
163	All the Kingpin's Men!	Wein/Andru	Len Wein	Oct. 1976
Spider-Man re-encounters a group of costumed villains (met in #153, 154 and 160) and he is captured by their boss, the Kingpin.
164	The Final Hour!	Wein/Andru	Len Wein	Nov. 1976
The Kingpin uses Spider-Man's life force to reanimate his son Richard Fisk, but with the help of Dr. Curt Connors, Spider-Man is able to reverse the deadly effects.
165	Stegron Stalks the City!	Wein/Andru	Len Wein	Dec. 1976
Stegron kidnaps Billy Connors, Curt Connors' son, so that Connors will create a formula for him. Peter makes up with Mary Jane. J. Jonah Jameson hires Dr. Marla Madison to create the fourth Spider-Slayer. Stegron battles Spider-Man using four re-animated dinosaur skeletons. The Lizard returns.
166	War of the Reptile-Men!	Wein/Andru	Len Wein	Jan. 1977
Spider-Man battles the Lizard. Harry Osborn and Liz Allan announce their engagement. Introduction of the fourth Spider-Slayer. Stegron battles the Lizard. Stegron re-animates the four dinosaur skeletons into living dinosaurs, which wreak havoc in the city. Spider-Man battles Stegron and the Lizard. The Lizard is defeated, but Stegron escapes, only to fall into hibernation induced by the New York winter.
167	Stalked by the Spider-Slayer!	Wein/Andru	Len Wein	Feb. 1977
Jonah tests the fourth Spider-Slayer. The first appearance of the Will-o'-the Wisp. Aunt May pickets her landlord over rent control. The fourth Spider-Slayer attacks Spider-Man. The first appearance of Dr. Barton Hamilton, Harry Osborn's psychiatrist. An enraged Robbie Robertson berates Spider-Man for visiting his home. Spider-Man breaks into J. Jonah Jameson's office and steals the evidence Jonah holds against him. Spider-Man battles the Will-o'-the-Wisp after catching him stealing plans. Creator Todd McFarlane has stated that Amazing Spider-Man #167 was the first comic book he ever purchased, at age 16, later citing it as a major influence on his artistic style.
168	Warfare on the Great White Way!	Wein/Andru	Len Wein	March 1977
Spider-Man battles the fourth Spider-Slayer and the Will-o'-the-Wisp. The Will-o'-the-Wisp is revealed to be working for Dr. Jonas Harrow.
169	Confrontation	Wein/Andru	Len Wein	April 1977
J. Jonah Jameson shows Peter Parker the photos of him disposing of his clone. Jameson believes that the pictures prove that Spider-Man killed Peter Parker, and then began impersonating him. Peter, however (who had broken into Jameson's office as Spider-Man, and having found the photos, used them to create fake photos) makes Jameson believe that his proof consists of forged photos. Spider-Man stumbles on a group of criminals using a laser gun made by the Tinkerer. Their boss is revealed to be Doctor Faustus.
170	Madness is All in the Mind!	Wein/Andru	Len Wein	May 1977
Spider-Man battles Dr. Faustus.
171	Photon is Another Name for...?	Wein/Andru	Len Wein	June 1977
Nova guest stars. Continued from Nova #12.
172	The Fiend from the Fire	Wein/Andru	Len Wein	July 1977
The first appearance of the Rocket Racer. The Molten Man returns.
173	If You Can't Stand the Heat...!	Wein/Andru	Len Wein	Aug. 1977
Spider-Man battles the Molten Man and saves Liz Allan. The apparent second death of the Molten Man. Liz Allan blames herself for the Molten Man's apparent death.
174	The Hitman's Back in Town!	Wein/Andru	Len Wein	Sept. 1977
The Hitman is hired by the People's Liberation Front to kidnap J. Jonah Jameson. Spider-Man and the Punisher join up to battle him. Harry Osborn reveals that Liz Allan has broken up with him; Peter and Flash take him to see his psychiatrist, Dr. Barton Hamilton.
175	Big Apple Battleground!	Wein/Andru	Len Wein	Oct. 1977
The PLF attempt to blow up the Statue of Liberty with J. Jonah Jameson sitting on top of it. The Punisher and Spider-Man save the day; the death of the Hitman. Harry Osborn becomes enraged during a therapy session and attacks Dr. Barton Hamilton; the shadowy victor of the fight proclaims himself to be the third Green Goblin.
176	He Who Laughs Last...!	Wein/Andru	Len Wein	Nov. 1977
The first appearance of the third Green Goblin. Aunt May has a heart attack while protesting outside of City Hall. The third Green Goblin attacks Flash and Spider-Man.
177	Goblin in the Middle	Wein/Andru	Len Wein	Dec. 1977
Spider-Man saves Flash. The third Green Goblin tries to take over the criminal underworld from Silvermane.
178	Green Grows the Goblin	Wein/Andru	Len Wein	Jan. 1978
Spider-Man escapes from Silvermane's men. The hospital needs Peter to sign off on surgery for Aunt May, but he is captured by the third Green Goblin.
179	The Goblin's Always Greener...!	Wein/Andru	Len Wein	Feb. 1978
The battle between the third Green Goblin, Silvermane, and Spider-Man continues. Aunt May's operation is successful. Harry Osborn is revealed as the Goblin's prisoner.
180	Who Was that Goblin I Saw You With?	Wein/Andru	Len Wein	March 1978
The third Green Goblin is revealed to be Harry Osborn's psychiatrist, Dr. Barton Hamilton. Hamilton and Osborn fight each other, both as the Green Goblin, and Hamilton ends up dying. Harry Osborn and Liz Allan reunite.
181	Flashback!	Bill Mantlo/Buscema	Marv Wolfman	April 1978
Origin of Spider-Man retold.
182	The Rocket Racer's Back in Town!	Marv Wolfman/Andru	Marv Wolfman	May 1978
Peter Parker proposes to Mary Jane Watson. Return of the Rocket Racer.
183	...And Where the Big Wheel Stops, Nobody Knows!	Wolfman/Andru	Marv Wolfman	June 1978
Mary Jane says no to Peter Parker's proposal. Spider-Man defeats Rocket Racer and Big Wheel.
184	White Dragon! Red Death!	Wolfman/Andru	Marv Wolfman	July 1978
The first appearance of White Dragon. Betty Brant returns to New York, leaving Ned Leeds.
185	Spider, Spider, Burning Bright!	Wolfman/Andru	Marv Wolfman	Aug. 1978
Peter Parker's graduation from college (except he does not graduate because he is one credit short, requiring him to do make-up work over the summer).
186	Chaos is...the Chameleon!	Wolfman/Keith Pollard	Marv Wolfman	Sept. 1978
Spider-Man begins a brief stint where he is recognized as a hero by the general public. Chameleon (working for Spencer Smythe) tries to destroy his reputation.
187	The Power of Electro!	Wolfman/Jim Starlin	Marv Wolfman	Oct. 1978
Captain America guest stars. Cap and Spider-Man must rescue a child that has the plague from Electro (also working for Spencer Smythe).
188	The Jigsaw Is Up!	Wolfman/Pollard	Marv Wolfman	Nov. 1978
John Jameson's cryogenically frozen body is stolen. Spider-Man battles Jigsaw.
189	Mayhem by Moonlight!	Wolfman/John Byrne	Marv Wolfman	Dec. 1978
Spencer Smythe uses John Jameson / the Man-Wolf to attack J. Jonah Jameson and Spider-Man.
190	In Search of the Man-Wolf!	Wolfman/Byrne	Marv Wolfman	Jan. 1979
Conclusion of the battle with the Man-Wolf. Spencer Smythe is revealed to be behind the preceding events.
191	Wanted for Murder: Spider-Man!	Wolfman/Pollard	Marv Wolfman	Feb. 1979
The first appearance of the fifth Spider-Slayer.
192	24 Hours Till Doomsday!	Wolfman/Pollard	Marv Wolfman	March 1979
Death of Spencer Smythe (creator of the Spider-Slayers). Spider-Man and J. Jonah Jameson are handcuffed together with a bomb.
193	The Wings of the Fearsome Fly!	Wolfman/Pollard	Marv Wolfman	April 1979
Return of the Fly. Dr. Ludwig Rinehart (the original Mysterio) returns, working at Aunt May's nursing home.
194	Never Let the Black Cat Cross Your Path!	Wolfman/Pollard	Marv Wolfman	May 1979
The first appearance of the Black Cat.
195	Nine Lives Has the Black Cat!	Wolfman/Pollard	Marv Wolfman	June 1979
The Black Cat apparently dies.
196	Requiem!	Wolfman/Al Milgrom	Marv Wolfman	July 1979
Peter Parker is told that his Aunt May is dead.
197	The Kingpin's Midnight Massacre!	Wolfman/Pollard	Marv Wolfman	Aug. 1979
Spider-Man battles the Kingpin.
198	Mysterio is Deadlier by the Dozen!	Wolfman/Buscema	Marv Wolfman	Sept. 1979
Spider-Man remembers that Dr. Ludwig Rinehart was an alias of the original Mysterio (from issue #24).
199	Now You See Me! Now You Die!	Wolfman/Buscema	Marv Wolfman	Oct. 1979
The original Mysterio still makes Spider-Man's life miserable.
200	The Spider and the Burglar...A Sequel	Wolfman/Pollard	Marv Wolfman	Nov. 1979
Death of the Burglar who killed Uncle Ben. Aunt May is revealed to be still alive.

== The Amazing Spider-Man #201–300 (December 1979 – March 1988) ==
Issue #	Title	Author / Illustrator	Editor	Release date
201	Man-Hunt!	Marv Wolfman/Keith Pollard	Marv Wolfman	Dec. 1979
Spider-Man tries to cover a story about a drug dealer, while the Punisher tries to kill the dealer.
202	One for those Long Gone!	Wolfman/Pollard	Marv Wolfman	Jan. 1980
Continuing from the previous issue, Spider-Man and the Punisher work together.
203	Bewitched, Bothered and Be-Dazzled!	Wolfman/Pollard	Marv Wolfman	Feb. 1980
Spider-Man tries to protect Dazzler.
204	The Black Cat Always Lands on Her Feet!	Wolfman/Pollard	Marv Wolfman	March 1980
The Black Cat returns.
205	...In Love and War!	David Michelinie/Pollard	Denny O'Neil	April 1980
The second part of the Black Cat's return.
206	A Method in his Madness!	Roger Stern/John Byrne	Denny O'Neil	May 1980
Jonas Harrow causes everyone in the Daily Bugle to go wild.
207	Final Curtain	Denny O'Neil/Jim Mooney	Denny O'Neil	June 1980
Spider-Man encounters Mesmero.
208	Fusion	O'Neil/John Romita, Jr.	Denny O'Neil	July 1980
Spider-Man battles Fusion.
209	To Salvage My Honor!	O'Neil/Alan Weiss	Denny O'Neil	Aug. 1980
The first appearance of Calypso. Kraven the Hunter and Calypso team up to battle Spider-Man.
210	The Prophecy of Madame Web!	O'Neil/Romita, Jr.	Denny O'Neil	Sept. 1980
The first appearance of Madame Web.
211	The Spider and the Sea-Scourge!	O'Neil/Romita, Jr.	Denny O'Neil	Oct. 1980
Spider-Man battles Namor the Sub-Mariner.
212	The Coming of Hydro-Man!	O'Neil/Romita, Jr.	Denny O'Neil	Nov. 1980
The first appearance of Hydro-Man.
213	All They Want To Do Is Kill You, Spider-Man...	O'Neil/Romita, Jr.	Denny O'Neil	Dec. 1980
Spider-Man battles the Wizard and his Robot-Spider.
214	Then Shall We Both Be Betrayed!	O'Neil/Romita, Jr.	Denny O'Neil	Jan. 1981
Namor and Spider-Man battle the Frightful Four part 1.
215	By My Powers Shall I Be Vanquished!	O'Neil/Romita, Jr.	Denny O'Neil	Feb. 1981
Namor and Spider-Man battle the Frightful Four part 2.
216	Marathon	O'Neil/Romita, Jr.	Denny O'Neil	March 1981
The return of Madame Web.
217	Here's Mud in Your Eye!	O'Neil/Romita, Jr.	Denny O'Neil	April 1981
The Sandman and Hydro-Man battle.
218	Eye of the Beholder!	O'Neil/Romita, Jr.	Denny O'Neil	May 1981
Hydro-Man and Sandman accidentally merge into the mindless Mudman; Frank Miller-drawn cover.
219	Peter Parker—Criminal!	O'Neil/Luke McDonnell	Denny O'Neil	June 1981
Peter Parker is sent to prison; Frank Miller-drawn cover.
220	A Coffin for Spider-Man!	Michael Fleisher/Mike W. Barr/Bob McLeod/Winslow Mortimer	Denny O'Neil	July 1981
Moon Knight appears and teams up with Spider-Man.
221	Blues for Lonesome Pinky!	O'Neil/Alan Kupperberg	Tom DeFalco	Aug. 1981
Spider-Man battles Ramrod.
222	Faster than the Eye!	Bill Mantlo/Bob Hall	Tom DeFalco	Sept. 1981
Spider-Man battles Speed Demon.
223	Night of the Ape!	O'Neil/J.M. DeMatteis/Romita, Jr.	Tom DeFalco	Oct. 1981
Spider-Man battles the Super-Apes.
224	Let Fly These Aged Wings!	Stern/Romita, Jr.	Tom DeFalco	Nov. 1981
The Vulture returns; the Stern/Romita Jr. creative team begins.
225	Fools...Like Us!	Stern/Romita, Jr.	Tom DeFalco	Dec. 1981
Spider-Man battles the second Foolkiller.
226	But the Cat Came Back...	Stern/Romita, Jr.	Tom DeFalco	Jan. 1982
The Black Cat returns again.
227	Goin' Straight!	Stern/Romita, Jr.	Tom DeFalco	Feb. 1982
The Black Cat's second return part 2.
228	Murder by Spider	Jan Strnad/Rick Leonardi	Tom DeFalco	March 1982
Spider-Man tries to solve a mystery of a man killed by spiders.
229	Nothing Can Stop the Juggernaut Part 1	Stern/Romita, Jr.	Tom DeFalco	April 1982
Spider-Man tries to rescue Madame Web from Black Tom Cassidy and the Juggernaut.
230	Nothing Can Stop the Juggernaut Part 2	Stern/Romita, Jr.	Tom DeFalco	May 1982
Black Tom Cassidy and the Juggernaut guest star.
231	Caught in the Act...	Stern/Romita, Jr.	Tom DeFalco	June 1982
Spider-Man battles the Cobra and Mister Hyde part 1.
232	Hyde...in Plain Sight!	Stern/Romita, Jr.	Tom DeFalco	July 1982
Spider-Man battles the Cobra and Mister Hyde part 2.
233	Where the @¢%# is Nose Norton?	Stern/Romita, Jr.	Tom DeFalco	Aug. 1982
The Tarantula returns.
234	Now Shall Will-O'-The-Wisp Have His Revenge!	Stern/Romita, Jr.	Tom DeFalco	Sept. 1982
The Tarantula mutates into a monster that is more spider than man.
235	Look Out There's a Monster Coming!	Stern/Romita, Jr.	Tom DeFalco	Oct. 1982
The Tarantula's mutation story continues.
236	Death Knell!	Stern/Romita, Jr.	Tom DeFalco	Nov. 1982
The death of the Tarantula.
237	High & Mighty!	Stern/Mantlo/Hall	Tom DeFalco	Dec. 1982
Spider-Man faces off against the Stilt-Man.
238	Shadow of Evils Past!	Stern/Romita, Jr.	Tom DeFalco	Jan. 1983
The first appearance of the Hobgoblin.
239	Now Strikes the Hobgoblin!	Stern/Romita, Jr.	Tom DeFalco	Feb. 1983
The second appearance of the Hobgoblin.
240	Wings of Vengeance!	Stern/Romita, Jr.	Tom DeFalco	March 1983
The Vulture returns part 1.
241	In the Beginning...	Stern/Romita, Jr.	Tom DeFalco	April 1983
The Vulture returns part 2. The origin of the Vulture is revealed.
242	Confrontations!	Stern/Romita, Jr.	Tom DeFalco	May 1983
Spider-Man battles the Mad Thinker and the Awesome Android. Mary Jane returns after a lengthy absence.
243	Options!	Stern/Romita, Jr.	Tom DeFalco	June 1983
Peter drops out of Empire State University.
244	Ordeals!	Stern/Romita, Jr.	Tom DeFalco	July 1983
The Hobgoblin returns.
245	Sacrifice Play!	Stern/Romita, Jr.	Tom DeFalco	Aug. 1983
The Hobgoblin uses a double and fakes his death; however, Spider-Man is left knowing the truth.
246	The Daydreamers!	Stern/Romita, Jr.	Tom DeFalco/Danny Fingeroth	Sept. 1983
An imaginary story where J. Jonah Jameson beats up Spider-Man in public.
247	Interruptions	Stern/Romita, Jr.	Danny Fingeroth/Tom DeFalco	Oct. 1983
Spider-Man attempts to stop an armored car robbery and fails. Thunderball, one of the members of the Wrecking Crew, returns.
248	Thunderball Battles Spider-Man; The Kid Who Collects Spider-Man	Stern/Romita, Jr./Ron Frenz	Bob DeNatale	Nov. 1983
Spider-Man's battle with Thunderball comes to a close and Spider-Man meets Tim Harrison.
249	Secrets!	Stern/Romita, Jr.	Danny Fingeroth	Dec. 1983
Secret Wars tie-in issue. Spider-Man battles the Hobgoblin.
250	Confessions!	Stern/Romita, Jr.	Danny Fingeroth	Jan. 1984
Secret Wars tie-in issue. The end of the Stern/Romita Jr. run.
251	Endings!	Stern/Tom DeFalco/Frenz	Danny Fingeroth	Feb. 1984
Secret Wars tie-in issue. The end of the Hobgoblin (for now).
252	Homecoming!	Stern/DeFalco/Frenz	Danny Fingeroth	March 1984
Secret Wars tie-in issue. The first real appearance of Spider-Man's alien costume. He acquired it during the Secret Wars crossover event.
253	By Myself Betrayed!	DeFalco/Leonardi	Danny Fingeroth	April 1984
The first appearance of the Rose.
254	With Great Power...	DeFalco/Leonardi	Danny Fingeroth	May 1984
Spider-Man battles Jack O'Lantern.
255	Even a Ghost Can Fear the Night!	DeFalco/Frenz	Danny Fingeroth	June 1984
The first appearance of the Black Fox.
256	Introducing...Puma!	DeFalco/Frenz	Danny Fingeroth	July 1984
The first appearance of the Puma.
257	Beware the Claws of Puma!	DeFalco/Frenz	Danny Fingeroth	Aug. 1984
Mary Jane tells Peter Parker that she knows he is Spider-Man.
258	The Sinister Secret of Spider-Man's New Costume	DeFalco/Frenz	Danny Fingeroth	Sept. 1984
Spider-Man learns that his costume is a living alien symbiote. Mr. Fantastic helps to remove and contain it. First appearance of the "Amazing Bag-Man" costume.
259	All My Pasts Remembered!	DeFalco/Frenz	Danny Fingeroth	Oct. 1984
The Hobgoblin returns. Mary Jane reveals her past. Spider-Man returns to using his original costume.
260	The Challenge of the Hobgoblin!	DeFalco/Frenz	Danny Fingeroth	Nov. 1984
The Hobgoblin searches for Harry Osborn about his father's journal. Spider-Man and the Hobgoblin battle and the Rose also appears.
261	The Sins of My Father!	DeFalco/Frenz	Danny Fingeroth	Dec. 1984
The Hobgoblin escapes and battles Spider-Man again at the Rose's lair. The Hobgoblin escapes with one journal.
262	Trade Secret	Bob Layton	Tom DeFalco/Danny Fingeroth	Jan. 1985
A tabloid reporter photographs Peter Parker while he is changing out of his Spider-Man costume.
263	The Spectacular Spider-Kid!	DeFalco/Frenz	Danny Fingeroth	Feb. 1985
The first appearance of Spider-Kid. Liz Allan gives birth to Normie Osborn, the son of Harry Osborn.
264	Red 9 and Red Tape!	Craig Anderson/Paty Cockrum	Jim Owsley	March 1985
Spider-Man battles Red 9.
265	After the Fox!	DeFalco/Frenz	Jim Owsley	April 1985
The first appearance of Silver Sable. The Black Fox also returns and escapes with the help of Spider-Man.
266	Jump for My Love or Spring is in the Air	Peter David/Sal Buscema	Jim Owsley	May 1985
Spider-Man encounters the Frog-Man and the Toad.
267	The Commuter Cometh!	David/McLeod	Jim Owsley	June 1985
Spider-Man chases a robber out of the city into the suburbs.
268	This Gold is Mine!	DeFalco/Frenz	Jim Owsley	July 1985
Part of the Secret Wars II crossover event. Spider-Man must deal with the effects of the Beyonder transforming an office building entirely into gold.
269	Burn, Spider, Burn!	DeFalco/Frenz	Jim Owsley	Aug. 1985
Spider-Man vs. Firelord (part 1).
270	The Hero and the Holocaust!	DeFalco/Frenz	Jim Owsley	Sept. 1985
Spider-Man vs. Firelord (part 2).
271	Whatever Happened to Crusher Hogan?	DeFalco/Frenz	Jim Owsley	Oct. 1985
The return of Crusher Hogan.
272	Make Way for Slyde!	DeFalco/Buscema	Jim Owsley	Nov. 1985
The first appearance of Slyde.
273	To Challenge the Beyonder!	DeFalco/Frenz	Jim Owsley	Dec. 1985
Secret Wars II tie-in issue; the Beyonder and the Puma guest-star.
274	Lo, There Shall Come a Champion!	DeFalco/Frenz/Tom Morgan/James Fry	Jim Owsley	Jan. 1986
Secret Wars II tie-in issue: the Beyonder and Mephisto battle for control of the universe using Spider-Man as a pawn; 32-page story with no ads.
275	The Choice and the Challenge	DeFalco/Frenz	Jim Owsley	Feb. 1986
The Hobgoblin returns, collecting money for the Rose; reprint of Amazing Fantasy #15 as Spider-Man tells his origin to Mary Jane; issue slightly larger than the average comic book. In the end, Spider-Man is defeated by the Hobgoblin.
276	Spider-Man Unmasked!	DeFalco/Frenz	Jim Owsley	March 1986
Spider-Man escapes; when the Hobgoblin sees Flash Thompson making fun of him, he sets Flash up to be the Hobgoblin.
277	The Rules of the Game	DeFalco/Frenz/Charles Vess	Jim Owsley	April 1986
Two short stories. First story: Peter visits Matt Murdock at a homeless mission as a crossover story to the Daredevil storyline "Born Again" running concurrently. Second story: Spider-Man saves a girl who gets lost in snowy New York City after being kidnapped.
278	If This Be Justice--	DeFalco/David/Mary Jo Duffy/Mike Harris	Jim Owsley	May 1986
An issue that is part of the Scourge of the Underworld crossover storyline taking place in Marvel Comics at the time.
279	Savage is the Sable!	DeFalco/Leonardi	Jim Owsley	June 1986
Neither Spider-Man nor Peter Parker appear in the issue, as Marvel Comics tries to suggest he is dead.
280	Introducing the Sinister Syndicate!	DeFalco/Frenz/Brett Breeding	Jim Owsley	July 1986
Spider-Man vs the Sinister Syndicate Part 1.
281	When Warriors Clash--!	DeFalco/Frenz/Breeding	Jim Owsley	Aug. 1986
Spider-Man vs the Sinister Syndicate Part 2.
282	The Fury of X-Factor!	DeFalco/Leonardi	Jim Owsley	Sept. 1986
J. Jonah Jameson hires X-Factor to hunt down Spider-Man.
283	With Foes Like These...	DeFalco/Frenz	Jim Owsley	Oct. 1986
Spider-Man vs. the Absorbing Man and Titania.
284	...And Who Shall Stand Against Them...?	DeFalco/Jim Owsley/Frenz/Breeding	Jim Salicrup	Nov. 1986
The beginning of the story "Gang War".
285	The Arranger Must Die!	DeFalco/Owsley/Kupperberg	Jim Salicrup	Dec. 1986
"Gang War" continues; the Punisher steps into the fray.
286	Thy Father's Son!	Owsley/Kupperberg	Jim Salicrup	Jan. 1987
"Gang War" continues.
287	...And There Shall Come a Reckoning	Owsley/Erik Larsen	Jim Salicrup	Feb. 1987
"Gang War" continues; Daredevil guest-stars.
288	Gang War Rages On!	Owsley/Kupperberg	Jim Salicrup	March 1987
"Gang War" concludes; Daredevil, the Falcon and the Black Cat guest-star.
289	The Hobgoblin Revealed!	David/Kupperberg/Morgan	Jim Salicrup	April 1987
The Hobgoblin is revealed to be Ned Leeds. Death of Ned Leeds.
290	The Big Question	Michelinie/Romita, Jr.	Jim Salicrup	May 1987
Peter Parker proposes to Mary Jane Watson again.
291	Dark Journey!	Michelinie/Romita, Jr.	Jim Salicrup	June 1987
Mary Jane says no to Peter Parker's proposal again.
292	Growing Pains!	Michelinie/Alex Saviuk	Jim Salicrup	July 1987
Mary Jane changes her mind and says yes to Peter Parker's proposal.
293	Crawling	DeMatteis/Mike Zeck	Jim Salicrup	Aug. 1987
Kraven the Hunter buries Spider-Man; Part 2 of the story "Kraven's Last Hunt".
294	Thunder	DeMatteis/Zeck	Jim Salicrup	Sept. 1987
Spider-Man seeks revenge on Kraven the Hunter; at the end of the issue, Kraven shoots himself in the head, killing himself. Part 5 of the story "Kraven's Last Hunt".
295	Mad Dogs	Ann Nocenti/Cynthia Martin	Jim Salicrup	Oct. 1987
Peter is committed to a mental hospital; Part 2 of the inter-issue story "Life in the Mad Dog Ward"; Bill Senkiewicz-drawn cover.
296	Force of Arms	Michelinie/Saviuk	Jim Salicrup	Nov. 1987
Doctor Octopus returns Part 1.
297	I'll Take Manhattan!	Michelinie/Saviuk	Jim Salicrup	Dec. 1987
Doctor Octopus returns Part 2.
298	Chance Encounter!	Michelinie/Todd McFarlane	Jim Salicrup	Jan. 1988
First issue penciled by Todd McFarlane; Venom makes his first appearance on the issue's last page.
299	Survival of the Hittist!	Michelinie/McFarlane	Jim Salicrup	Feb. 1988
The first full appearance of Venom.
300	Venom	Michelinie/McFarlane	Jim Salicrup	March 1988
Spider-Man's 25th anniversary issue. First issue inked by Todd McFarlane (the previous two issues were only penciled by him). Spider-Man battles Venom. He uses the bells that he originally used to expel the symbiote off him, which eventually led to it merging with Eddie Brock, who became Venom. At the request of Mary Jane, he permanently reverts to his original costume (Mary Jane was spooked by Venom when she thought he was Spider-Man because of the symbiote's resemblance to Spider-Man's black costume).

== The Amazing Spider-Man #301–400 (April 1988 – February 1995) ==
Issue #	Title	Author / Illustrator	Editor	Release date
301	The Sable-Gauntlet!	David Michelinie/Todd McFarlane	Jim Salicrup	April 1988
Silver Sable is hired to test a security system. Spider-Man saves her when he realizes that it is a trap.
302	Chaos in Kansas	Michelinie/McFarlane	Jim Salicrup	May 1988
First appearance of Dr. Royce Nero.
303	Dock Savage	Michelinie/McFarlane	Jim Salicrup	June 1988
Silver Sable hires Spider-Man and Sandman to track down the neo-Nazi Franz Krauz.
304	California Schemin'!	Michelinie/McFarlane	Jim Salicrup	July 1988
The Black Fox returns. Series goes bi-weekly.
305	Westward Woe	Michelinie/McFarlane	Jim Salicrup	July 1988
Spider-Man battles the Black Fox.
306	Humbugger	Michelinie/McFarlane	Jim Salicrup	Aug. 1988
The cover is a tribute to Action Comics #1.
307	The Thief Who Stole Himself	Michelinie/McFarlane	Jim Salicrup	Aug. 1988
Mary Jane is kidnapped. The Chameleon appears.
308	Dread	Michelinie/McFarlane	Jim Salicrup	Sept. 1988
The Taskmaster appears.
309	Styx and Stone	Michelinie/McFarlane	Jim Salicrup	Sept. 1988
Spider-Man fights Styx and Stone. Series goes back to being published monthly.
310	Shrike Force!	Michelinie/McFarlane	Jim Salicrup	Oct. 1988
Peter returns to school.
311	Mysteries of the Dead	Michelinie/McFarlane	Jim Salicrup	Nov. 1988
The return of Mysterio.
312	The Goblin War	Michelinie/McFarlane	Jim Salicrup	Dec. 1988
The Green Goblin vs. the Hobgoblin.
313	Slithereens	Michelinie/McFarlane	Jim Salicrup	Jan. 1989
The return of the Lizard.
314	Down and Out in Forest Hills	Michelinie/McFarlane	Jim Salicrup	Feb. 1989
Peter and MJ are evicted from their apartment.
315	A Matter of Life and Debt	Michelinie/McFarlane	Jim Salicrup	March 1989
The Return of Venom Part 1. Spider-Man also fights Hydro-Man.
316	Dead Meat	Michelinie/McFarlane	Jim Salicrup	April 1989
The Return of Venom Part 2. Venom breaks Black Cat's nose and finds out Peter's address.
317	The Sand and the Fury	Michelinie/McFarlane	Jim Salicrup	May 1989
The Return of Venom Part 3. Spider-Man fights Venom and wins by tricking the symbiote into trying to leave Brock.
318	Sting Your Partner	Michelinie/McFarlane	Jim Salicrup	June 1989
Justin Hammer hires Scorpion to kidnap General Chester Musgrave.
319	The Scorpion's Tail of Woe	Michelinie/McFarlane	Jim Salicrup	July 1989
Justin Hammer sends Rhino and Blacklash after the Scorpion. Series goes bi-weekly again.
320	License Invoked	Michelinie/McFarlane	Jim Salicrup	July 1989
The Assassin Nation Plot Part 1. Guest-starring Paladin and Silver Sable.
321	Under War	Michelinie/McFarlane	Jim Salicrup	Aug. 1989
The Assassin Nation Plot Part 2.
322	Ceremony	Michelinie/McFarlane	Jim Salicrup	Aug. 1989
The Assassin Nation Plot Part 3.
323	Assault Rivals	Michelinie/McFarlane	Jim Salicrup	Sept. 1989
The Assassin Nation Plot Part 4. Guest-starring Captain America.
324	Twos Day	Michelinie/Erik Larsen	Jim Salicrup	Sept. 1989
The Assassin Nation Plot Part 5. Guest-starring Sabretooth.
325	Finale in Red	Michelinie/McFarlane	Jim Salicrup	Sept. 1989
The Assassin Nation Plot Part 6. The Red Skull appears.
326	Gravity Storm!	Michelinie/Colleen Doran	Jim Salicrup	Oct. 1989
Cosmic Spider-Man/Acts of Vengeance Part 1. Spider-Man faces Graviton.
327	Cunning Attractions!	Michelinie/Larsen	Jim Salicrup	Oct. 1989
Cosmic Spider-Man/Acts of Vengeance Part 4. Spider-Man fights Magneto.
328	Shaw's Gambit!	Michelinie/McFarlane	Jim Salicrup	Nov. 1989
Cosmic Spider-Man/Acts of Vengeance Part 7. Spider-Man fights the Hulk. Last McFarlane drawn issue.
329	Power Prey	Michelinie/Larsen	Jim Salicrup	Dec. 1989
Cosmic Spider-Man/Acts of Vengeance Part 10. Spider-Man fights the Tri-Sentinel and loses the powers of Captain Universe.
330	The Powder Chase	Michelinie/Larsen	Jim Salicrup	Jan. 1990
Spider-Man and the Punisher track down shipments of cocaine guarded by the U.S. military.
331	The Death Standard	Michelinie/Larsen	Jim Salicrup	Feb. 1990
Spider-Man and the Punisher destroy the drugs. Venom escapes from the Vault.
332	Sunday in the Park with Venom	Michelinie/Larsen	Jim Salicrup	March 1990
Venom's Back Part 1.
333	Stalking Feat	Michelinie/Larsen	Jim Salicrup	April 1990
Venom's Back Part 2.
334	Secrets, Puzzles, and Little Fears	Michelinie/Larsen	Jim Salicrup	May 1990
The Return of the Sinister Six Part 1. Series goes bi-weekly again for the summer.
335	Shocks	Michelinie/Larsen	Jim Salicrup	May 1990
The Return of the Sinister Six Part 2.
336	The Wagers of Sin	Michelinie/Larsen	Jim Salicrup	June 1990
The Return of the Sinister Six Part 3.
337	Rites and Wrongs	Michelinie/Larsen	Jim Salicrup	June 1990
The Return of the Sinister Six Part 4.
338	Death from Above	Michelinie/Larsen	Jim Salicrup	July 1990
The Return of the Sinister Six Part 5.
339	The Killing Cure	Michelinie/Larsen	Jim Salicrup	July 1990
The Return of the Sinister Six Part 6. Series goes back to being published monthly again.
340	Female Trouble!	Michelinie/Larsen	Jim Salicrup	Aug. 1990
The first appearance of the Femme Fatales (Mindblast, Whiplash, Bloodlust and Knockout).
341	With(out) Great Power	Michelinie/Larsen	Jim Salicrup	Sept. 1990
Powerless Part 1. Spider-Man loses his spider-powers.
342	The Jonah Trade!	Michelinie/Larsen	Jim Salicrup	Oct. 1990
Powerless Part 2.
343	War Garden	Michelinie/Larsen	Jim Salicrup	Nov. 1990
Powerless Part 3. Spider-Man regains his spider-powers.
344	Hearts and Powers	Michelinie/Larsen	Jim Salicrup	Dec. 1990
Spider-Man battles Cardiac and the Rhino. First appearance of Cletus Kasady.
345	Gun from the Heart!	Michelinie/Mark Bagley	Jim Salicrup	Jan. 1991
Venom Lives Part 1. Venom escapes from jail and leaves part of the symbiote behind with Cletus Kasady.
346	Elliptical Pursuit!	Michelinie/Larsen	Danny Fingeroth	Feb. 1991
Venom Lives Part 2.
347	The Boneyard Hop!	Michelinie/Larsen	Danny Fingeroth	March 1991
Venom Lives Part 3. Spider-Man fights Venom and fakes his death.
348	Righteous Sand	Michelinie/Larsen	Danny Fingeroth	April 1991
The Sandman leads the Avengers.
349	Man of Steal!	Michelinie/Larsen	Danny Fingeroth	May 1991
The Black Fox returns.
350	Doom Service!	Michelinie/Larsen	Danny Fingeroth	June 1991
Spider-Man returns the Dragon's Egg to Doctor Doom and turns the Black Fox in to the police. Last Erik Larsen drawn issue.
351	Three Faces of Evil!	Michelinie/Bagley	Danny Fingeroth	July 1991
Return of the Tri-Sentinel Part 1.
352	Death Walk	Michelinie/Bagley	Danny Fingeroth	Aug. 1991
Return of the Tri-Sentinel Part 2.
353	When Midnight Strikes!	Al Milgrom/Bagley	Danny Fingeroth	Sept. 1991
Round Robin: The Sidekick's Revenge Part 1. Guest-starring the Punisher, Darkhawk, Nova, the Moon Knight and Night Thrasher. Series goes bi-weekly again.
354	Wilde at Heart!	Milgrom/Bagley	Danny Fingeroth	Sept. 1991
Round Robin: The Sidekick's Revenge Part 2.
355	Total Eclipse of the Moon...Knight	Milgrom/Bagley	Danny Fingeroth	Oct. 1991
Round Robin: The Sidekick's Revenge Part 3.
356	After Midnight!	Milgrom/Bagley	Danny Fingeroth	Oct. 1991
Round Robin: The Sidekick's Revenge Part 4.
357	A Bagel with Nova!	Milgrom/Bagley	Danny Fingeroth	Nov. 1991
Round Robin: The Sidekick's Revenge Part 5.
358	Out on a Limb	Milgrom/Bagley	Danny Fingeroth	Nov. 1991
Round Robin: The Sidekick's Revenge Part 6. Series goes back to being published monthly again.
359	Toy Death!	Michelinie/Chris Marrinan	Danny Fingeroth	Dec. 1991
Return of Cardiac Part 1. Guest-starring the Black Cat.
360	Death Toy!	Michelinie/Marrinan	Danny Fingeroth	Jan. 1992
Return of Cardiac Part 2. First partial appearance of Carnage.
361	Savage Genesis!	Michelinie/Bagley	Danny Fingeroth	Feb. 1992
Carnage Part 1.
362	Savage Alliance!	Michelinie/Bagley	Danny Fingeroth	March 1992
Carnage Part 2.
363	Savage Grace!	Michelinie/Bagley	Danny Fingeroth	April 1992
Carnage Part 3.
364	The Pain of Fast Air	Michelinie/Bagley	Danny Fingeroth	May 1992
The Deadly Foes of Spider-Man epilogue.
365	Fathers and Sins	Various	Danny Fingeroth	June 1992
30th anniversary issue. First appearance of Spider-Man 2099.
366	Skullwork	Michelinie/Jerry Bingham	Danny Fingeroth	July 1992
Spider-Man searches for answers after his parents have suddenly returned after 20 years. The Red Skull appears.
367	Skullduggery	Michelinie/Bingham	Danny Fingeroth	Aug. 1992
Spider-Man and Solo fight the Taskmaster.
368	On Razored Wings	Michelinie/J.M. DeMatteis/Bagley/Aaron Lopresti	Danny Fingeroth	Sept. 1992
Invasion of the Spider-Slayers Part 1. First appearance of the Spider-Slayers "Alien" and "Birdy", and Alistair Smythe as the Ultimate Spider-Slayer. Series goes bi-weekly again.
369	Electric Doom	Michelinie/DeMatteis/Bagley/Tod Smith	Danny Fingeroth	Sept. 1992
Invasion of the Spider-Slayers Part 2. First appearance of the Spider-Slayer "Dark Iron Man."
370	Life Stings	Michelinie/DeMatteis/Bagley/Lopresti	Danny Fingeroth	Oct. 1992
Invasion of the Spider-Slayers Part 3. First appearance of the Spider-Slayer "Amoeboid."
371	One Clue Over the Cuckoo's Nest	Michelinie/Milgrom/Bagley/Lopresti	Danny Fingeroth	Oct. 1992
Invasion of the Spider-Slayers Part 4. First appearance of the Spider-Slayer "Tri-Head."
372	Arachnophobia Too	Michelinie/Milgrom/Bagley/Lopresti	Danny Fingeroth	Nov. 1992
Invasion of the Spider-Slayers Part 5. First appearance of the Spider-Slayers "Black Widow," "Tarantula" and "Scorpion."
373	The Bedlam Perspective	Michelinie/Bagley/Smith	Danny Fingeroth	Nov. 1992
Invasion of the Spider-Slayers Part 6. Series goes back to being published monthly again.
374	Murder on Parade	Michelinie/Bagley	Danny Fingeroth	Dec. 1992
Venom kidnaps Peter's parents.
375	The Bride of Venom	Michelinie/Bagley	Danny Fingeroth	Jan. 1993
Spider-Man and Venom make an agreement, which leads up to the miniseries Venom: Lethal Protector.
376	Guilt by Association	Michelinie/Steven Grant/Jeff Johnson	Danny Fingeroth	Feb. 1993
Spider-Man battles Styx and Stone. Guest-starring Cardiac.
377	Dust to Dust	Michelinie/Grant/Johnson	Danny Fingeroth	March 1993
Spider-Man stops Cardiac from killing Styx.
378	Demons on Broadway	Michelinie/Bagley	Danny Fingeroth	April 1993
Maximum Carnage Part 3. Carnage defeats Venom, who crashes at Peter and MJ's apartment.
379	The Gathering Storm	Michelinie/Bagley	Danny Fingeroth	May 1993
Maximum Carnage Part 7. Firestar almost kills Carnage before she is stopped by Spider-Man.
380	Soldiers of Hope	Michelinie/Bagley	Danny Fingeroth	June 1993
Maximum Carnage Part 11. Spider-Man, Firestar, Captain America, Deathlok and Iron Fist try to stop Shriek. Nightwatch and Morbius try to save Venom from Carnage.
381	Samson Unleashed	Michelinie/Bagley	Danny Fingeroth	July 1993
Spider-Man and the Hulk fight Doc Samson, who has been infected by a gamma virus.
382	Emerald Rage	Michelinie/Bagley	Danny Fingeroth	Aug. 1993
The gamma virus is transferred from Doc Samson to the Hulk. Spider-Man and Doc Samson fight the Hulk.
383	Judgement Night	Michelinie/Bagley	Danny Fingeroth	Sept. 1993
Trial by Jury Part 1. Spider-Man is put on trial for bringing the Venom symbiote to Earth.
384	Dreams of Innocence	Michelinie/Bagley	Danny Fingeroth	Oct. 1993
Trial by Jury Part 2. Spider-Man pleads guilty.
385	Rough Justice	Michelinie/Bagley	Danny Fingeroth	Nov. 1993
Trial by Jury Part 3. Spider-Man agrees to help the Jury steal a weapon that can kill Venom, but turns on the Jury once he is out of danger. Peter puts an end to MJ's smoking addiction by having her visit Nick Katzenburg, who is in the hospital suffering from lung cancer.
386	The Wings of Age	Michelinie/Bagley	Danny Fingeroth	Dec. 1993
Lifetheft Part 1. The Vulture returns.
387	The Thief of Years	Michelinie/Bagley	Danny Fingeroth	Jan. 1994
Lifetheft Part 2. The Vulture uses the rejuvenator to make himself young again and turn Spider-Man old, but the effects are only temporary. Peter Parker reveals to his parents that he is Spider-Man.
388	The Sadness of Truth	Michelinie/Bagley/Ron Lim/Larry Alexander	Danny Fingeroth	Feb. 1994
Lifetheft Part 3. Peter's parents are revealed to be robots created by the Chameleon.
389	The Faceless Man	DeMatteis/Bagley	Danny Fingeroth	March 1994
Pursuit Part 4. Filled with madness and rage, Spider-Man relentlessly hunts down the Chameleon and almost kills him, but manages not to cross the line. While looking through the Chameleon's computer, Peter sees a message titled: "Spider-Man: For Your Eyes Only." It is revealed that Harry Osborn had told the Chameleon to bring Peter's parents back in order to make Peter feel the suffering Harry did when he lost his father.
390	Behind the Walls	DeMatteis/Bagley	Danny Fingeroth	April 1994
Shrieking Part 1. Shriek escapes from Ravencroft, trying to turn Malcom McBride into Carrion.
391	The Burning Fuse	DeMatteis/Bagley	Danny Fingeroth	May 1994
Shrieking Part 2. Spider-Man, still heavily distressed aggressively attacks Shriek. Malcom McBride becomes Carrion again. Aunt May has a sudden stroke.
392	Peter Parker No More!	DeMatteis/Bagley	Danny Fingeroth	June 1994
Shrieking Part 3. Peter learns about Aunt May's stroke. Spider-Man follows Carrion and Shriek to the house of Malcom's mother.
393	Mother Love...Mother Hate	DeMatteis/Bagley	Danny Fingeroth	July 1994
Shrieking Part 4. Malcolm McBride struggles between his human and Carrion side. He accidentally ends up using his death touch against himself. Shriek sacrifices herself to save Malcolm. Peter comes back only to see that MJ has left to confront her past. Spider-Man renounces the "man" side of him, Peter Parker, and is now only the Spider.
394	Breakdown	DeMatteis/Bagley	Danny Fingeroth	Aug. 1994
Power and Responsibility Part 2. The Clone Saga begins. Dr. Judas Traveller takes over Ravencroft, threatening to release all the inmates if Spider-Man doesn't show up.
395	Outcasts	DeMatteis/Bagley	Danny Fingeroth	Sept. 1994
Back from the Edge Part 1. Spider-Man meets Nocturne and the Puma.
396	Deadmen	DeMatteis/Bagley	Danny Fingeroth	Oct. 1994
Back from the Edge Part 3. Spider-Man seeks out Daredevil for advice about his problems. The Vulture launches a virus that will kill thousands of people.
397	Tentacles	DeMatteis/Bagley	Danny Fingeroth	Nov. 1994
Web of Death Part 1. First appearance of Stunner. Doctor Octopus learns that Peter Parker is Spider-Man.
398	Before I Wake	DeMatteis/Bagley	Danny Fingeroth	Dec. 1994
Web of Death Part 3. Mary Jane is pregnant. Doctor Octopus works to find a cure for the virus that has infected Peter.
399	The Jackal Reborn	DeMatteis/Bagley	Danny Fingeroth	Jan. 1995
Smoke and Mirrors Part 2. Spider-Man meets the Scarlet Spider. The Jackal, who was thought dead in The Amazing Spider-Man #149, turns out to be still alive.
400	A Death in the Family	DeMatteis/Bagley	Danny Fingeroth	Feb. 1995
Aunt May tells Peter that she knows he is Spider-Man. Death of Aunt May.

== The Amazing Spider-Man #401–499 (March 1995 - September 2003) ==
=== The Amazing Spider-Man #401–441 (March 1995 – September 1998) ===
Issue #	Title	Author / Illustrator	Editor	Release date
401	Down in the Darkness	J.M. DeMatteis/Mark Bagley	Danny Fingeroth	March 1995
The Mark of Kaine Part 2. Judas Traveller gets Peter out of jail to save Mary Jane.
402	Crossfire: Part 1	DeMatteis/Bagley	Danny Fingeroth	April 1995
Spider-Man tries to clear Peter's name of murder charges.
403	Savage Judgement	DeMatteis/Bagley	Danny Fingeroth	May 1995
The Trial of Peter Parker Part 2. Spider-Man is on trial in Ravencroft, with Carnage as the prosecutor.
404	War of the Spider-Men!	DeMatteis/Todd DeZago/Bagley	Danny Fingeroth	June 1995
Maximum Clonage Part 3. Appearances by Ben Reilly, Kaine, Jackal, and Spidercide.
405	Wired for Death	DeMatteis/DeZago/Darick Robertson	Danny Fingeroth	July 1995
Exiled Part 2. Dr. Seward Trainer's lab is destroyed.
406	Crossroads	DeMatteis/Angel Medina	Danny Fingeroth	Aug. 1995
The Greatest Responsibility Part 1. First appearance of Doctor Octopus (Carolyn Trainer). Title becomes The Amazing Scarlet Spider for two months.
407	Sand Trap!	Tom DeFalco/Bagley	Bob Budiansky	Nov. 1995
The Return of Spider-Man Part 2. Ben Reilly becomes Spider-Man.
408	Impossible, Be My Dream!	DeFalco/Bagley	Bob Budiansky	Dec. 1995
Mysterio uses a TV network to turn people into mindless zombies.
409	Of Wagers and Wars	DeFalco/Bagley	Bob Budiansky	Jan. 1996
The Return of Kaine Part 3. Spider-Man and Kaine are forced to participate in The Great Game.
410	Spider Carnage	DeFalco/Bagley	Bob Budiansky	Feb. 1996
Web of Carnage Part 2. Carnage bonds with Ben Reilly.
411	Targets!	DeFalco/Bagley	Bob Budiansky	March 1996
Blood Brothers Part 2. The mercenary group Cell-12 beats up a powerless Peter Parker. First appearance of Gaunt. Contains a scene which references the night Bruce Wayne's parents are murdered by a mugger, except Spider-Man saves the day.
412	The Face of My Enemy!	DeFalco/Bagley	Ralph Macchio	April 1996
Blood Brothers Part 6. Guest-starring the Molten Man. The Molten Man tries to figure out why Oscorp is pumping so much money into its subsidiary, Multivex. Spider-Man fights the Molten Man, thinking he is working for Gaunt.
413	Bug Story	DeFalco/Bagley	Ralph Macchio	May 1996
Mysterio traps Spider-Man in a room full of hostile toys.
414	From Darkness Strikes – Delilah	DeFalco/Bagley	Ralph Macchio	June 1996
First appearance of the Rose and Delilah.
415	Siege	DeFalco/Bagley	Ralph Macchio	July 1996
Onslaught Impact 2: The Sentinels Take Manhattan! Spider-Man saves the Daily Bugle from the Sentinels.
416	The Road Block	DeFalco/Ron Garney	Ralph Macchio	Aug. 1996
Aftermath of Onslaught. Spider-Man pays tribute to the now-fallen Fantastic Four, Avengers and X-Men.
417	Secrets!	DeFalco/Garney	Ralph Macchio	Sept. 1996
Spider-Man, Chakra and Peter fight the Brotherhood of Scriers to save Judas Traveller.
418	Torment	DeFalco/Steve Skroce	Ralph Macchio	Oct. 1996
Revelations Part 3. Mendel Stromm/the Robot Master goes after Peter and Ben. Spider-Man (Ben Reilly) and Peter fight the Robot Master. Mary Jane goes into labor. Ben Reilly is captured by Stromm's employer. Norman Osborn is revealed to still be alive. Ending of the Clone Saga.
419	The Bite of the Black Tarantula is Always – Fatal	DeFalco/Skroce	Ralph Macchio	Nov. 1996
First appearance of El Uno.
420	T'was the Night Before Christmas	DeFalco/Skroce	Ralph Macchio	Dec. 1996
Peter meets Nate Grey.
421	Enter: The Dragonfly	DeFalco/Skroce/Geof Isherwood	Ralph Macchio	Jan. 1997
First appearance of the Dragonfly.
422	Exposed Wiring	DeFalco/Joe Bennett	Ralph Macchio	Feb. 1997
Electro reflects on his past.
423	Choices	DeFalco/Bennett	Ralph Macchio	March 1997
Spider-Man battles Electro.
424	Then Came...Elektra	DeFalco/Bennett	Ralph Macchio	April 1997
Spider-Man and Elektra battle the True Believers.
–1	Where Have All The Heroes Gone; The Secrets of Peter Parker!	DeFalco/Bennett/Pat Olliffe	Ralph Macchio	May 1997
Part of Marvel's Flashback Month Initiative. A young Peter Parker looks through Uncle Ben's old comics in the attic.
425	The Chump, the Challenge, and the Champion	DeFalco/Skroce	Ralph Macchio	June 1997
Spider-Man and Nate Grey battle Electro.
426	Only the Evil Return!	DeFalco/Skroce	Ralph Macchio	July 1997
The Return of Doctor Octopus Part 1. The True Believers capture Spider-Man in order to resurrect Doctor Octopus.
427	The Doctor is In!	DeFalco/Skroce	Ralph Macchio	Aug. 1997
The Return of Doctor Octopus Part 2. Spider-Man escapes. Stunner sacrifices herself to revive Doctor Octopus.
428	A Farewell to Arms	DeFalco/Skroce	Ralph Macchio	Sept. 1997
The Return of Doctor Octopus Part 3. Doctor Octopus rampages through New York and tries to recover his memory.
429	The Price!	DeFalco/Skroce	Ralph Macchio	Oct. 1997
Spider-Man battles Titania and the Absorbing Man.
430	Savage Rebirth!	DeFalco/Bennett	Ralph Macchio	Nov. 1997
Carnage escapes from Ravencroft and bonds with the Silver Surfer, becoming the Carnage Cosmic.
431	The Carnage Cosmic	DeFalco/Bennett	Ralph Macchio	Dec. 1997
Spider-Man battles the Carnage Cosmic.
432	The Hunted	DeFalco/John Romita, Jr.	Ralph Macchio	Jan. 1998
Spider-Hunt Part 2. First full appearance of the Black Tarantula.
433	Nowhere to Hyde!	DeFalco/Tom Lyle	Ralph Macchio	Feb. 1998
Spider-Man fights Mister Hyde.
434	'Round and 'Round with Ricochet!	DeFalco/Bennett	Ralph Macchio	March 1998
Identity Crisis – Ricochet Part 1. Spider-Man is wanted, so Peter is forced to disguise himself as Ricochet.
435	Fun 'n Games with the Four Star Squad!	DeFalco/Bennett	Ralph Macchio	April 1998
Identity Crisis – Ricochet Part 2. Ricochet teams up with Delilah to go after the Black Tarantula.
436	My Enemies – Unmasked	DeFalco/Bennett	Ralph Macchio	May 1998
The Black tarantula tries to kidnap one of Mary Jane's friends. Final battle between Spider-Man and the Black Tarantula. The Rose is revealed to be Jacob Conover.
437	I, Monster	DeFalco/Rafael Kayanan	Ralph Macchio	June 1998
Plant-Man mutates Spider-Man into a Spider-Monster.
438	Seeing is Disbelieving!	DeFalco/Scott Kolins	Ralph Macchio	July 1998
Spider-Man and Daredevil fight Synario.
439	There Once Was A Spider..!	DeFalco/Kayanan	Ralph Macchio	July 1998
1,000 years in the future, some archeologists find a buried web-shooter and study the history of Spider-Man.
440	A Hot Time in the Old Town	John Byrne/Kayanan	Ralph Macchio	Aug. 1998
The Gathering of Five Part 2. Spider-Man fights the Molten Man.
441	And Who Shall Claim A Kingly Crown	Byrne/Kayanan	Ralph Macchio	Sept. 1998
The Final Chapter Part 1. The Gathering of Five commences. Alison Monograin tells Peter that March is alive. Peter assumes she is referring to his and Mary Jane's lost child.

=== The Amazing Spider-Man (vol. 2) #1–58 (November 1998 – September 2003) ===
Issue #	Title	Author / Illustrator	Editor	Release date
1 | 442	Where R U Spider-Man???	Howard Mackie/John Byrne	Ralph Macchio	Nov. 1998
Peter gets a job at TriCorp.
2 | 443	I Can't ... (And I Don't Want To) ... But I Must!	Mackie/Byrne	Ralph Macchio	Dec. 1998
The new "Spider-Man" is revealed to be Mattie Franklin, who gained her powers from The Gathering of Five.
3 | 444	Off to a Flying Start!	Mackie/Byrne	Ralph Macchio	Jan. 1999
The new "Spider-Man" fights Shadrac.
4 | 445	Betrayals	Mackie/Byrne	Ralph Macchio	Feb. 1999
The Frightful Four return.
5 | 446	...And Then There Was One!	Mackie/Byrne	Ralph Macchio	March 1999
A new evil Spider-Woman hunts down other Spider-Women.
6 | 447	Truth Be Told (...or Not)	Mackie/Byrne	Ralph Macchio	April 1999
Origin of evil Spider-Woman. Spider-Man and Mattie Franklin fight Spider-Woman. The evil Spider-Woman is revealed to be a genetic pawn created by Doctor Octopus.
7 | 448	Heroes and Villains	Mackie/Byrne	Ralph Macchio	May 1999
The Perfect World Part 1. Trapped inside a "Perfect World," Flash Thompson and Spider-Man team up with the Fantastic Four to stop Doctor Doom.
8 | 449	The Man Behind the Curtain!	Mackie/Byrne	Ralph Macchio	June 1999
The Perfect World Part 2. Mysterio is revealed to have trapped everyone close to Spider-Man in the "Perfect World."
9 | 450	The List	Mackie/Byrne	Ralph Macchio	July 1999
Peter Parker learns that those present at the experiment that gave him his powers are being hunted down and killed.
10 | 451	And Then There Were...	Mackie/Byrne	Ralph Macchio	Aug. 1999
Mary Jane gets mysterious calls from a stalker.
11 | 452	Bright Lights...Bigger City	Mackie/Byrne	Ralph Macchio	Sept. 1999
Peter Parker returns to being Spider-Man, unbeknownst to Mary Jane.
12 | 453	Another Return of the Sinister Six!	Mackie/Byrne	Ralph Macchio	Oct. 1999
The Sinister Six (Mysterio, Vulture, Sandman, Kraven the Hunter, Electro, and Venom) return.
13 | 454	Time Enough ..?	Mackie/Byrne	Ralph Macchio	Nov. 1999
First appearance of the new Rocket Racer. MJ's plane crashes.
14 | 455	A Surfeit of Spiders	Mackie/Byrne	Ralph Macchio	Dec. 1999
Mattie Franklin is pursued by Julia Carpenter, the second Spider-Woman.
15 | 456	We're All Doomed...Again!	Mackie/Byrne	Ralph Macchio	Jan. 2000
Peter searches for MJ in Latveria, where he runs into Doctor Doom.
16 | 457	Coming Home	Mackie/Byrne	Ralph Macchio	Feb. 2000
Peter runs into financial problems. Appearance by the Ghost.
17 | 458	Dust in the Wind	Mackie/Byrne	Ralph Macchio	March 2000
The Sandman is dying from Venom's bite. Venom tries to kill Mysterio and Electro.
18 | 459	Homeward Bound	Mackie/Byrne	Ralph Macchio	April 2000
Peter's costume and web-shooters are stolen. The Green Goblin returns.
19 | 460	Mirror Mirror	Mackie/Erik Larsen	Ralph Macchio	May 2000
Spider-Man wears his black costume and fights Venom.
20 | 461	Set Up!	Mackie/Larsen	Ralph Macchio	June 2000
Alistair Smythe and the Spider-Slayers return.
21 | 462	Slayers to the Left of Me...	Mackie/Larsen	Ralph Macchio	July 2000
Spider-Man fights the Spider Slayers.
22 | 463	The Distinguished Gentleman from New York	Mackie/John Romita, Jr.	Ralph Macchio	Aug. 2000
Senator Ward targets Arthur Stacy and his children.
23 | 464	How Many Times?	Mackie/Romita, Jr.	Ralph Macchio	Sept. 2000
Senator Ward's past is revealed.
24 | 465	Failure Is Not An Option	Mackie/Romita, Jr.	Ralph Macchio	Oct. 2000
Senator Ward attempts to transfer the alien pathogen in his body to everyone else.
25 | 466	Darkness Calling	Mackie/Romita, Jr.	Ralph Macchio	Nov. 2000
Norman Osborn captures Peter Parker and tries to make him his heir.
26 | 467	The Mask	Mackie/Romita, Jr.	Ralph Macchio	Dec. 2000
Peter Parker investigates his father while fighting the Squid.
27 | 468	The Stray	Mackie/Romita, Jr.	Axel Alonso	Jan. 2001
A.I.M. agents hunt down a cat rescued by Spider-Man.
28 | 469	Distractions	Mackie/Joe Bennett	Axel Alonso	Feb. 2001
The Enforcers return. MJ is being held prisoner.
29 | 470	Mary Jane	Mackie/Lee Weeks	Axel Alonso	March 2001
Mary Jane returns.
30 | 471	Transformations, Literal & Otherwise	J. Michael Straczynski/Romita, Jr.	Axel Alonso	April 2001
Part 1 of 6. First appearances of Ezekiel Sims and Morlun. Issues begin appearing with (vol. 1) numbering in addition to (vol. 2) numbering. Beginning of the Straczynski/Romita, Jr. run.
31 | 472	Coming Home	Straczynski/Romita, Jr.	Axel Alonso	May 2001
Part 2 of 6. Peter becomes a science teacher at Midtown High. A school shooter attacks the school and is revealed to be a kid that was bullied at school.
32 | 473	The Long, Dark Pizza of the Soul	Straczynski/Romita, Jr.	Axel Alonso	June 2001
Part 3 of 6. Morlun searches for Spider-Man. Ezekiel offers to keep Peter safe from Morlun by hiding him in an advanced shelter, but Peter refuses to give up on his great responsibility.
33 | 474	All Fall Down	Straczynski/Romita, Jr.	Axel Alonso	July 2001
Part 4 of 6. Spider-Man fights Morlun.
34 | 475	Meltdown	Straczynski/Romita, Jr.	Axel Alonso	Aug. 2001
Part 5 of 6. Ezekiel helps Spider-Man fight Morlun.
35 | 476	Coming Out	Straczynski/Romita, Jr.	Axel Alonso	Sept. 2001
Part 6 of 6. Spider-Man defeats Morlun by injecting himself with radiation. Aunt May sees Peter, who has passed out on his bed with his Spider-Man costume on, and finds out that he is Spider-Man.
36 | 477	Stand Tall	Straczynski/Romita, Jr.	Axel Alonso	Oct. 2001
A tribute to the real life events of 9/11/2001. Spider-Man and the other Marvel heroes and villains reflect on the shock and sorrow of the catastrophe they could not stop.
37 | 478	Interlude	Straczynski/Romita, Jr.	Axel Alonso	Nov. 2001
Aunt May is in shock after finding out the truth about Peter. Peter tries to help one of his students and discovers that she lives in a condemned building. Aunt May tells Peter they need to talk.
38 | 479	The Conversation	Straczynski/Romita, Jr.	Axel Alonso	Dec. 2001
Peter tells Aunt May about his part in Uncle Ben's death and his life as Spider-Man.
39 | 480	Meanwhile...	Straczynski/Romita, Jr.	Axel Alonso	March 2002
No dialogue, part of the 'Nuff Said event.
40 | 481	Sensitive Issues	Straczynski/Romita, Jr.	Axel Alonso	April 2002
Part 1 of 3. Spider-Man investigates a mystery of disappearing kids.
41 | 482	Looking Back	Straczynski/Romita, Jr.	Axel Alonso	May 2002
Part 2 of 3. First appearance of Detective William Lamont. After realizing that the kidnapper of the kids, Shade, uses the Astral Plane, Spider-Man seeks out Doctor Strange.
42 | 483	A Strange Turn of Events	Straczynski/Romita, Jr.	Axel Alonso	June 2002
Part 3 of 3. Doctor Strange uses the Hand of Vishanti to send Spider-Man into the astral plane. Peter defeats Shade and frees the kids, but realizes that time passes faster in the Astral Plane, and misses MJ's visit.
43 | 484	Cold Arms	Straczynski/Romita, Jr.	Axel Alonso	July 2002
Part 1 of 3. First appearance of Doctor Octopus (Carlyle). Peter and Aunt May visit MJ in L.A.
44 | 485	Arms and the Men	Straczynski/Romita, Jr.	Axel Alonso	Aug. 2002
Part 2 of 3. Doctor Octopus fights Carlyle through a hotel. Spider-Man holds up the collapsing hotel, allowing people to escape, but Doctor Octopus drops the hotel on Spider-Man.
45 | 486	Until the Stars Turn Cold	Straczynski/Romita, Jr.	Axel Alonso	Sept. 2002
Part 3 of 3. Carlyle attacks MJ's studio. Spider-Man and Doctor Octopus team up to defeat him.
46 | 487	Unnatural Enemies	Straczynski/Romita, Jr.	Axel Alonso	Oct. 2002
Part 1 of 3. Shathra (the Spider-Wasp) attacks Spider-Man.
47 | 488	The Life & Death of Spiders	Straczynski/Romita, Jr.	Axel Alonso	Nov. 2002
Part 2 of 3. Shathra tries to ruin Spider-Man's reputation by telling the Daily Bugle that she and Spider-Man were lovers. Peter is angry, and attacks Shathra on TV, forcing her to reveal her true self to everyone.
48 | 489	A Spider's Tale	Straczynski/Romita, Jr.	Axel Alonso	Dec. 2002
Part 3 of 3. Spider-Man has been weakened by Shathra's sting. Ezekiel returns and helps Spider-Man defeat Shathra.
49 | 490	Bad Connections	Straczynski/Romita, Jr.	Axel Alonso	Jan. 2003
Part 1 of 2. Peter visits MJ in Los Angeles while MJ visits Peter in New York. A storm causes both of their planes to stop at Denver.
50 | 491	Doomed Affairs	Straczynski/Romita, Jr.	Axel Alonso	Feb. 2003
Part 2 of 2. Spider-Man and Captain America protect Dr. Doom from Latverian freedom fighters to protect innocents. Peter and MJ reunite.
51 | 492	Digger	Straczynski/Romita, Jr.	Axel Alonso	March 2003
Part 1 of 4. The government tests a weapon emitting gamma radiation in the Nevada Desert unaware that the bodies of 13 mob bosses murdered by Morris Forelli lie there. The gamma radiation turns the bodies into a creature called Digger.
52 | 493	Dig This	Straczynski/Romita, Jr.	Axel Alonso	April 2003
Part 2 of 4. Spider-Man works for Forelli to investigate the Digger.
53 | 494	Parts and Pieces	Straczynski/Romita, Jr.	Axel Alonso	May 2003
Part 3 of 4. Spider-Man fights Digger to protect Forelli.
54 | 495	The Balancing of Karmic Accounts	Straczynski/Romita, Jr.	Axel Alonso	June 2003
Part 4 of 4. Spider-Man creates a weapon to defeat Digger, and records a confession from Forelli about his ordering of the 13 murders. Spider-Man uses his new money to build the Gwen Stacy Memorial.
55 | 496	Unintended Consequences	Straczynski/Fiona Avery/Romita, Jr.	Axel Alonso	July 2003
Part 1 of 2. Peter helps one of his students named Melissa and sees a picture of her brother, who has been missing after being released from jail. Peter realizes that he, as Spider-Man, was responsible, as he sent her brother to jail months ago for carjacking.
56 | 497	The Revolution Within	Straczynski/Avery/Romita, Jr.	Axel Alonso	Aug. 2003
Part 2 of 2. Peter investigates Melissa's brother and realizes he has become part of a society of former criminals. Spider-Man tracks the congregation down, believing he is taking down a criminal operation, until Ezekiel reveals that he is the leader of this group and that he is keeping these criminals from returning to crime.
57 | 498	Happy Birthday Part 1	Straczynski/Romita, Jr.	Axel Alonso	Aug. 2003
Part 1 of 3. Spider-Man joins helps the Avengers, the Fantastic Four, and the X-Men battle the Mindless Ones. Mr. Fantastic uses a device to send the Mindless Ones home, but Dr. Strange arrives too late, and reveals that they have been tricked into reviving Dormammu.
58 | 499	Happy Birthday Part 2	Straczynski/Romita, Jr.	Axel Alonso	Sept. 2003
Part 2 of 3. Dr. Strange battles Dormammu and attempts to cast a spell to kill both himself and Dormammu. Spider-Man interferes and is stuck between time, seeing both his past and possible future.

== The Amazing Spider-Man #500–545 (October 2003 – December 2007) ==
Issue #	Title	Author / Illustrator	Editor	Release date
500	Happy Birthday Part 3	J. Michael Straczynski/John Romita, Jr./John Romita Sr.	Axel Alonso	Oct. 2003
Part 3 of 3. In order to save the universe from Dormammu, Peter must relive the most important moments of his life and fight his way back to the present.
501	Saturday in the Park with May	Straczynski/Romita, Jr.	Axel Alonso	Nov. 2003
Aunt May sits on a bench at the cemetery, talking to Uncle Ben's grave about her concerns over Peter's double life.
502	You Want Pants With That?	Straczynski/Romita, Jr.	Axel Alonso	Dec. 2003
First named appearance of Leo Zelinsky and Killshot.
503	Chasing A Dark Shadow	Fiona Avery/Straczynski/Romita, Jr.	Axel Alonso	Jan. 2004
Part 1 of 2. Spider-Man and Loki team up to fight Morwen.
504	The Coming of Chaos	Avery/Straczynski/Romita, Jr.	Axel Alonso	Feb. 2004
Part 2 of 2. Spider-Man saves Tess Black, Loki's daughter, from Morwen.
505	Vibes	Avery/Straczynski/Romita, Jr.	Axel Alonso	March 2004
Spider-Man confronts a young kid in possession of a gun.
506	The Book of Ezekiel: Chapter One	Straczynski/Romita, Jr.	Axel Alonso	April 2004
Ezekiel Sims warns Peter of a big danger coming and takes him to South America.
507	The Book of Ezekiel: Chapter Two	Straczynski/Romita, Jr.	Axel Alonso	May 2004
The Gatekeeper captures Spider-Man and reveals the truth about Ezekiel.
508	The Book of Ezekiel: Chapter Three	Straczynski/Romita, Jr.	Axel Alonso	June 2004
Peter realizes that all the supernatural threats that came after him were after Ezekiel, not him. Ezekiel performs a ritual for the Gatekeeper to consume Spider-Man, but when Ezekiel sees Spider-Man's life flash before him, Ezekiel sacrifices himself to save Peter. The end of the Straczynski/Romita, Jr. run.
509	Sins Past Part One	Straczynski/Mike Deodato, Jr.	Axel Alonso	June 2004
Peter receives a letter containing bad news written by Gwen Stacy a long time ago, but is missing information. Peter is attacked while visiting Gwen's grave and the assailants find out he is Spider-Man.
510	Sins Past Part Two	Straczynski/Deodato, Jr.	Axel Alonso	July 2004
Spider-Man sends the letter to Lamont for analysis and finds out that Gwen was pregnant and that the two assassins are her children.
511	Sins Past Part Three	Straczynski/Deodato, Jr.	Axel Alonso	Aug. 2004
Peter steals Gwen's DNA to confirm whether Sarah and Gabe are Gwen's children. Sarah confronts Peter after his suspicions are confirmed.
512	Sins Past Part Four	Straczynski/Deodato, Jr.	Axel Alonso	Sept. 2004
Mary Jane confesses to Peter that she knew that Gwen Stacy had an affair with Norman Osborn, who had brainwashed the kids to kill Spider-Man, and that the Goblin killed Gwen so that he could keep the children.
513	Sins Past Part Five	Straczynski/Deodato, Jr.	Axel Alonso	Oct. 2004
Spider-Man calls a press conference to confront Gabriel and Sarah on the Brooklyn Bridge and tells them the truth. Sarah believes him, but Gabriel does not.
514	Sins Past Part Six	Straczynski/Deodato, Jr.	Axel Alonso	Nov. 2004
Spider-Man offers a blood transfusion to save Sarah. Gabriel becomes the Grey Goblin, but ends up with amnesia.
515	Skin Deep Part One	Straczynski/Deodato, Jr./Mark Brooks	Axel Alonso	Dec. 2004
Peter's old friend, Charlie Weiderman, fails an experiment despite Peter's warnings, causing an impenetrable suit to be stuck to his body.
516	Skin Deep Part Two	Straczynski/Deodato, Jr./Brooks	Axel Alonso	Jan. 2005
Charlie blames Spider-Man for the accident and tries to force Peter to help him.
517	Skin Deep Part Three	Straczynski/Deodato, Jr./Brooks	Axel Alonso	Feb. 2005
Peter refuses to help Charlie, so he targets Aunt May and Mary Jane.
518	Skin Deep Part Four	Straczynski/Deodato, Jr./Brooks	Axel Alonso	March 2005
Spider-Man fights and beats Charlie. However, Charlie burns Aunt May's house down.
519	Moving Up	Straczynski/Deodato, Jr.	Axel Alonso	April 2005
New Avengers Part 1 of 6. Peter, MJ, and May move into Avengers Tower.
520	Acts of Aggression	Straczynski/Deodato, Jr.	Axel Alonso	May 2005
New Avengers Part 2 of 6. Spider-Man and the Avengers fight evil duplicates of themselves created by Hydra.
521	Unintended Consequences	Straczynski/Deodato, Jr.	Axel Alonso	June 2005
New Avengers Part 3 of 6. Peter continues his investigation of Hydra. A tabloid reporter corners MJ.
522	Moving Targets	Straczynski/Deodato, Jr.	Axel Alonso	July 2005
New Avengers Part 4 of 6. The tabloid reporter publishes an incriminating story about MJ. Peter finds Hydra's lair.
523	Extreme Measures	Straczynski/Deodato, Jr.	Axel Alonso	Aug. 2005
New Avengers Part 5 of 6. Spider-Man and the Avengers fight the Hydra doppelgängers. Spider-Man stops Hydra's master plan, but is left falling from the blast of a rocket.
524	All Fall Down	Straczynski/Deodato, Jr.	Axel Alonso	Sept. 2005
New Avengers Part 6 of 6. Iron Man saves Peter and confronts the tabloid reporter.
525	The Other: Evolve Or Die Part 3 of 12: Rage	Peter David/Deodato, Jr.	Axel Alonso	Oct. 2005
Tracer infiltrates Avengers Tower and talks to Aunt May. Spider-Man battles Tracer.
526	The Other: Evolve Or Die Part 6 of 12: Reckoning	Reginald Hudlin/Deodato, Jr.	Axel Alonso	Nov. 2005
Morlun beats Spider-Man to a bloody pulp and eats his eye.
527	The Other: Evolve Or Die Part 9 of 12: Evolution	Straczynski/Deodato, Jr.	Axel Alonso	Dec. 2005
Spider-Man embraces the Other and is reborn from a cocoon.
528	The Other: Evolve Or Die Part 12 of 12: Post-Mortem	Straczynski/Deodato, Jr.	Axel Alonso	Jan. 2006
The Avengers run tests on Peter to see if he is real.
529	Mister Parker Goes to Washington Part 1	Straczynski/Ron Garney	Axel Alonso	Feb. 2006
The Road to Civil War. Tony gives Peter his new Iron Spider costume.
530	Mister Parker Goes to Washington Part 2	Straczynski/Tyler Kirkham	Axel Alonso	March 2006
The Road to Civil War. Tony and Peter go to Washington, D.C. to speak against the Superhuman Registration Act. They are attacked by the Titanium Man.
531	Mister Parker Goes to Washington Part 3	Straczynski/Kirkham	Axel Alonso	April 2006
The Road to Civil War. Spider-Man fights the Titanium Man.
532	The War at Home Part 1	Straczynski/Garney	Axel Alonso	May 2006
A Civil War tie-in issue. Aunt May and Mary Jane help Peter decide whether to reveal his secret identity to the world.
533	The War at Home Part 2	Straczynski/Garney	Axel Alonso	June 2006
A Civil War tie-in issue. Spider-Man reveals his identity as Peter Parker to the world.
534	The War at Home Part 3	Straczynski/Garney	Axel Alonso	July 2006
A Civil War tie-in issue. Spider-Man battles Captain America.
535	The War at Home Part 4	Straczynski/Garney	Axel Alonso	Sept. 2006
A Civil War tie-in issue. After seeing that the Pro-Registration side is locking up heroes in the Negative Zone, Spider-Man switches sides in the Civil War.
536	The War at Home Part 5	Straczynski/Garney	Axel Alonso	Nov. 2006
A Civil War tie-in issue. Spider-Man fights Iron Man and declares on TV that he is against the SHRA.
537	The War at Home Part 6	Straczynski/Garney	Axel Alonso	Jan. 2007
A Civil War tie-in issue. Spider-Man joins Captain America and the Anti-Registration heroes.
538	The War at Home Part 7	Straczynski/Garney	Axel Alonso	Feb. 2007
A Civil War tie-in issue. Spider-Man fights in the final battle of the Civil War. Aunt May is shot.
539	Back in Black Part 1	Straczynski/Garney	Axel Alonso	March 2007
Peter dons the Black Costume again and hunts down the people responsible for shooting Aunt May.
540	Back in Black Part 2	Straczynski/Garney	Axel Alonso	May 2007
Peter hunts down Jack Martino, the assassin that shot May, and finds out that the Kingpin ordered the hit.
541	Back in Black Part 3	Straczynski/Garney	Axel Alonso	June 2007
Peter breaks into prison with he intention to fight and kill the Kingpin.
542	Back in Black Part 4	Straczynski/Garney	Axel Alonso	July 2007
Peter brutally beats and humiliates the Kingpin. Peter shows the Kingpin how he will kill him and says that he will do it if May dies, letting Fisk know that there is nothing he can do to stop him.
543	Back in Black Part 5	Straczynski/Garney	Axel Alonso	Aug. 2007
Realizing they do not have enough money, Peter and MJ move Aunt May to a different hospital, committing a lifetime sentence's worth of felonies in the process.
544	One More Day Part 1	Straczynski/Joe Quesada	Axel Alonso	Sep. 2007
Peter is desperate and enraged for the fate of Aunt May, and vents his rage by attacking Tony Stark, demanding that he pays for Aunt May's expenses.
545	One More Day Part 4	Straczynski/Quesada	Axel Alonso	Dec. 2007
Mephisto erases Peter and MJ's marriage from history in exchange for Aunt May's life. Harry Osborn is resurrected. First appearance of Lily Hollister and Carlie Cooper.

== The Amazing Spider-Man #546–647 "Brand New Day" (January 2008 – November 2010) ==
Note: "Brand New Day" is a soft reboot stemming out of the events of One More Day. Three issues of The Amazing Spider-Man were published each month during this time. See Free Comic Book Day (2007): Spider-Man.

Issue #	Title	Author / Illustrator	Editor	Release date
546	Brand New Day	Dan Slott/Steve McNiven	Stephen Wacker	Jan. 2008
First appearances of the Spider-Mugger, the Freak, Mister Negative and Bill Hollister.
547	Crimes of the Heart	Slott/McNiven	Stephen Wacker	Jan. 2008
Spider-Man battles Mister Negative. With J. Jonah Jameson in the hospital, Marla Jameson sells the Daily Bugle to Dexter Bennett.
548	Blood Ties	Slott/McNiven	Stephen Wacker	Jan. 2008
The Spider-Mugger is killed. Mister Negative is revealed to be Martin Li.
549	Who's that Girl?!?	Marc Guggenheim/Salvador Larroca	Stephen Wacker	Feb. 2008
Spider-Man meets Jackpot for the first time since Amazing Spider-Man: Swing Shift. First appearance of Menace.
550	The Menace of...Menace!!	Guggenheim/Larroca	Stephen Wacker	Feb. 2008
Spider-Man and Jackpot team-up to defeat Menace.
551	Lo, There Shall Come a MENACE!!	Guggenheim/Larroca	Stephen Wacker	Feb. 2008
Lisa Parfrey, a candidate for the next mayor of the city, is impaled by Menace's glider and killed.
552	Just Blame Spider-Man	Bob Gale/Phil Jimenez	Stephen Wacker	March 2008
Spider-Man battles the Freak. Funeral of Lisa Parfrey. First appearance of the Bookie since Amazing Spider-Man: Swing Shift.
553	Freak-Out!	Gale/Jimenez	Stephen Wacker	March 2008
Spider-Man continues his battle with the Freak.
554	Burned!	Gale/Jimenez	Stephen Wacker	March 2008
Spider-Man battles the Freak and saves Randall Crowne. With Curt Connors' assistance, Spider-Man defeats the Freak by trapping him in a chrysalis.
555	Sometimes It Snows in April	Zeb Wells/Chris Bachalo	Stephen Wacker	April 2008
Spider-Man and Wolverine fight Mayan extremists in a blizzard.
556	The Last Nameless Day	Wells/Bachalo	Stephen Wacker	April 2008
Spider-Man continues his battle with the extremists.
557	Dead of Winter	Wells/Bachalo	Stephen Wacker	April 2008
Spider-Man stops a deity from merging with the leader of the extremists.
558	Freak the Third	Gale/Barry Kitson	Stephen Wacker	May 2008
Menace returns to New York. The Freak temporarily returns, but is put back in his chrysalis state and is taken away by Oscorp trucks.
559	Peter Parker, Paparazzi: Money Shot	Slott/Marcos Martin	Stephen Wacker	May 2008
Part 1 of 3. First appearances of Screwball, Paper Doll, and Bobby Carr.
560	Peter Parker, Paparazzi: Flat Out Crazy!	Slott/Martin	Stephen Wacker	May 2008
Part 2 of 3. Peter's paparazzi pics inspire Paper Doll to continue stalking Bobby Carr.
561	Peter Parker, Paparazzi: Photo Finished	Slott/Martin	Stephen Wacker	June 2008
Part 3 of 3. Robbie Robertson and Peter Parker quit The DB.
562	The Other Spider-Man	Gale/Mike McKone	Stephen Wacker	June 2008
Spider-Man fights an impostor.
563	So Spider-Man Walks Into a Bar AND...	Gale/McKone	Stephen Wacker	June 2008
Spider-Man visits the Bar with No Name.
564	Three-way Collision!	Guggenheim/Slott/Gale/Paulo Siqueira	Stephen Wacker	July 2008
Spider-Man, Vin Gonzales, and Overdrive's points of view of a battle between Overdrive and Spider-Man.
565	Kraven's First Hunt Part 1: To Squash a Spider!	Guggenheim/Jimenez	Stephen Wacker	July 2008
Spider-Man and Daredevil team up to fight Fracture. An unrevealed figure captures Vin Gonzales, believing him to be Spider-Man.
566	Kraven's First Hunt Part 2: Identity Crisis!	Guggenheim/Jimenez	Stephen Wacker	July 2008
Vermin returns. Spider-Man borrows a Daredevil costume to save Vin.
567	Kraven's First Hunt Part 3: Legacy	Guggenheim/Jimenez	Stephen Wacker	Aug. 2008
Spider-Man fights Vermin and saves Vin.
568	New Ways to Die Part One: Back With Vengeance	Slott/John Romita, Jr.	Stephen Wacker	Aug. 2008
Eddie Brock is cured of cancer.
569	New Ways to Die Part Two: The Osborn Supremacy	Slott/Romita, Jr.	Stephen Wacker	Aug. 2008
The first appearance of Anti-Venom.
570	New Ways to Die Part Three: The Killer Cure	Slott/Romita, Jr.	Stephen Wacker	Sept. 2008
Spider-Man, Venom, and Anti-Venom fight.
571	New Ways to Die Part Four: Opposites Attack	Slott/Romita, Jr.	Stephen Wacker	Sept. 2008
Spider-Man and Anti-Venom team up against the Thunderbolts.
572	New Ways to Die Part Five: Easy Target	Slott/Romita, Jr.	Stephen Wacker	Sept. 2008
Spider-Man fights Bullseye.
573	New Ways to Die Part Six: Weapons of Self-Destruction	Slott/Romita, Jr.	Stephen Wacker	Oct. 2008
Spider-Man and Anti-Venom fight the Thunderbolts, led by Green Goblin. In a backup story by Mark Waid and Patrick Olliffe, Stephen Colbert helps Spider-Man fight Grizzly.
574	Flashback	Guggenheim/Kitson	Stephen Wacker	Oct. 2008
In a medical hospital in Germany, Flash Thompson is awarded a medal of honor for what cost him his legs.
575	Family Ties Part 1	Joe Kelly/Bachalo	Stephen Wacker	Oct. 2008
Mister Negative uses Hammerhead as part of a plan to become the next big crime lord.
576	Family Ties Part 2	Kelly/Bachalo	Stephen Wacker	Nov. 2008
Spider-Man battles Hammerhead.
577	Old Huntin' Buddies; A Bookie Minute Mystery	Wells/Paolo Rivera	Stephen Wacker	Nov. 2008
Spider-Man teams up with the Punisher.
578	Unscheduled Stop Part 1	Mark Waid/Martin	Stephen Wacker	Nov. 2008
The Shocker derails a train carrying members of a jury, including J. Jonah Jameson Sr. (first appearance).
579	Unscheduled Stop Part 2	Waid/Martin	Stephen Wacker	Dec. 2008
Spider-Man rescues the trapped subway passengers. Jameson Sr. is revealed to be a supporter of Spider-Man.
580	Fill in the Blanks	Roger Stern/Lee Weeks	Stephen Wacker	Dec. 2008
Aunt May is caught in a bank robbery performed by the criminal known as the Blank.
581	Mind on Fire Part One: The Trouble with Harry	Slott/McKone	Stephen Wacker	Dec. 2008
Harry goes to his ex-wife Liz Allan to settle legal issues and Peter comes along, Carlie is angry at Lily and Peter, things go wrong when Liz's step-brother, the Molten Man, escapes.
582	Mind on Fire Part Two: Burning Questions	Slott/McKone	Stephen Wacker	Jan. 2009
Harry delivers a cure to Mark Raxton, curing him of his condition. The Bookie is murdered by the Spider-Tracer killer after learning his identity.
583	Platonic; Spidey Meets the President	Waid/McKone	Stephen Wacker	Jan. 2009
Peter tries and fails to plan a birthday surprise for Betty, but fails. Betty is furious when nobody turns up for her party, until Peter explains that none of her friends are happy with her and she realizes that Peter is her best friend. Includes a back-up story featuring Spider-Man meeting U.S. President Barack Obama. – March 2009
584	Character Assassination Part 1	Guggenheim/Romita, Jr.	Stephen Wacker	Jan. 2009
Peter hallucinates battling with Harry Osborn.
585	Character Assassination Part 2	Guggenheim/Romita, Jr.	Stephen Wacker	Feb. 2009
Harry discovers that Lily Hollister is Menace.
586	Character Assassination – Interlude	Guggenheim/Romita, Jr.	Stephen Wacker	Feb. 2009
Lily tells Harry her backstory and how she discovered the Goblin Formula and that Norman Osborn was the Green Goblin.
587	Character Assassination Part 3	Guggenheim/Romita, Jr.	Stephen Wacker	Feb. 2009
Spider-Man is captured and Matt Murdock (Daredevil) volunteers to be his lawyer.
588	Character Assassination – Conclusion	Guggenheim/Romita, Jr.	Stephen Wacker	March 2009
Harry, as the Green Goblin, cures Menace and unmasks her on live television.
589	Marked	Fred Van Lente/Siqueira	Stephen Wacker	March 2009
Return of the Spot.
590	Face Front Part One: Together for the First Time Again	Slott/Kitson	Stephen Wacker	April 2009
Spider-Man goes with the Fantastic Four to another dimension.
591	Face Front Part Two	Slott/Kitson/Dale Eaglesham	Stephen Wacker	April 2009
Spider-Man eventually reveals his secret identity as Peter Parker to the Fantastic Four. In the dimension they are in, time goes slower, so three months have passed in the real world. Carlie and Harry have gotten closer, Aunt May has continued her relationship with J. Jonah Jameson Sr., and somehow J. Jonah Jameson Jr. has been elected the new mayor of New York City.
592	24/7 Part One	Waid/McKone	Stephen Wacker	April 2009
Spider-Man tries to make a truce with J. Jonah Jameson Jr., but he orders a round-the-clock SWAT team to hunt down Spider-Man instead. To spite Jameson, Spider-Man goes on a three-day non-stop crimefighting spree that makes headlines all over New York. Looking for some rest, Spider-Man crashes at Aunt May's house, only to find her in bed with J. Jonah Jameson Sr.
593	24/7 Part Two	Waid/McKone	Stephen Wacker	May 2009
First appearance of the fourth Vulture (Jimmy Natale).
594	24/7 Finale	Waid/McKone	Stephen Wacker	May 2009
J. Jonah Jameson Jr. continues to hunt down Spider-Man.
595	American Son Part 1	Kelly/Jimenez	Stephen Wacker	May 2009
A "Dark Reign" issue. Peter hunts down Norman Osborn. Lily tells Harry that she is pregnant.
596	American Son Part 2	Kelly/Siqueria	Stephen Wacker	June 2009
A "Dark Reign" issue. Spider-Man fights Venom and Bullseye while infiltrating Dark Avengers headquarters.
597	American Son Part 3	Kelly/Marco Checchetto	Stephen Wacker	June 2009
A "Dark Reign" issue. Norman Osborn captures Spider-Man.
598	American Son Part 4	Kelly/Siqueria/Checchetto	Stephen Wacker	June 2009
A "Dark Reign" issue. Lily reveals that she is pregnant with Norman's child.
599	American Son: Conclusion	Kelly/Checchetto	Stephen Wacker	July 2009
A "Dark Reign" issue. Harry, in the Iron Patriot armor is enraged, and fights and defeats Norman. Spider-Man prevents Harry from killing Norman.
600	Last Legs	Slott/Romita, Jr.	Stephen Wacker	July 2009
First appearance of Doctor Octopus with eight mechanical arms instead of the normal four arms. Aunt May marries J. Jonah Jameson Sr. Mary Jane returns.
601	Red-Headed Stranger Part 1: No Place Like Home	Waid/Mario Alberti	Stephen Wacker	Aug. 2009
Peter has a hangover from Aunt May's wedding and his roommate threatens to kick him out.
602	Red-Headed Stranger Part 2: Tenth of September	Van Lente/Kitson	Stephen Wacker	Aug. 2009
The Chameleon returns and captures Peter.
603	Red-Headed Stranger Part 3: Deconstructing Peter	Van Lente/Kitson	Stephen Wacker	Aug. 2009
The Chameleon impersonates Peter.
604	Red-Headed Stranger Part 4: The Ancient Gallery	Van Lente/Kitson	Stephen Wacker	Sept. 2009
Spider-Man escapes and hunts down the Chameleon, but ends up fighting Jameson's Anti-Spider-Man Patrol.
605	Red-Headed Stranger – Epilogue	Van Lente/Brian Reed/Yanick Paquette	Stephen Wacker	Sept. 2009
The Chameleon meets with Mary Jane, while Peter is stuck fighting the Spider-Slayer Squad.
606	Long Term Arrangement Part One	Kelly/McKone	Stephen Wacker	Sept. 2009
The Black Cat returns.
607	Long Term Arrangement Part Two	Kelly/McKone	Stephen Wacker	Sept. 2009
The second part of the Black Cat's return.
608	Who Was Ben Reilly? Part One	Guggenheim/Checchetto/Luke Ross	Stephen Wacker	Oct. 2009
First appearance of Damon Ryder, who attacks Peter Parker, mistaking him for Ben Reilly.
609	Who Was Ben Reilly? Part Two	Guggenheim/Checchetto/Ross	Stephen Wacker	Oct. 2009
Damon Ryder traps Peter by capturing those close to him. He wants revenge on Ben Reilly for killing his family.
610	Who Was Ben Reilly? Part Three	Guggenheim/Checchetto/Ross	Stephen Wacker	Nov. 2009
Screwball and Kaine join the fight between Spider-Man and Damon. Kaine is revealed to be the real killer.
611	This Man, This Expletive Deleted	Kelly/Eric Canete	Stephen Wacker	Nov. 2009
Spider-Man fights Deadpool.
612	Power to the People Part 1	Waid/Paul Azaceta	Stephen Wacker	Nov. 2009
Electro returns, raising a mob of people in the name of fighting injustice and greed.
613	Power to the People Part 2	Waid/Azaceta	Stephen Wacker	Nov. 2009
As Electro's fame amongst people grows, his powers wax and wane uncontrollably.
614	Power to the People Part 3	Waid/Azaceta	Stephen Wacker	Dec. 2009
Spider-Man and J. Jonah Jameson put aside their differences to put an end to Electro.
615	Keemia's Castle Part 1	Van Lente/Javier Pulido	Stephen Wacker	Dec. 2009
The Sandman returns.
616	Keemia's Castle Part 2	Van Lente/Pulido	Stephen Wacker	Dec. 2009
Spider-Man fights the Sandman.
617	Rage of the Rhino	Kelly/Max Fiumara	Stephen Wacker	Jan. 2010
First appearance of the second Rhino.
618	Mysterioso Part 1: Un-Murder Incorporated	Slott/Martin	Stephen Wacker	Jan. 2010
The return of Mysterio.
619	Mysterioso Part 2: Re-Appearing Act	Slott/Martin	Stephen Wacker	Jan. 2010
Mysterio impersonates Silvermane and a bunch of other mob bosses to fool Spider-Man. Spider-Man realizes it is Mysterio when he sees Captain Stacy.
620	Mysterioso Part 3: Smoke & Mirrors	Slott/Martin	Stephen Wacker	Feb. 2010
Spider-Man foils Mysterio's scheme, but Mysterio escapes. Cameos by Mister Negative and the Chameleon.
621	Out for Blood	Slott/Michael Lark	Stephen Wacker	Feb. 2010
Spider-Man enlists the help of the Black Cat to steal the Devil's Breath gas from Mister Negative.
622	It is the Life; Stages of Grief	Greg Weisman/Van Lente/Ross/Joe Quinones	Stephen Wacker	Feb. 2010
Morbius returns. Flash Thompson goes through the five stages of grief backwards after losing his legs.
623	Scavenging Part One	Waid/Azaceta	Stephen Wacker	March 2010
The fourth Vulture returns and goes after J. Jonah Jameson.
624	Scavenging Part Two	Waid/Azaceta	Stephen Wacker	March 2010
Spider-Man battles the fourth Vulture.
625	Endangered Species	Kelly/Fiumara	Stephen Wacker	March 2010
The second Rhino battles the original Rhino and is killed.
626	The Sting	Van Lante/Michael Gaydos	Stephen Wacker	March 2010
Return of the Scorpion.
627	Something Can Stop the Juggernaut	Stern/Weeks	Stephen Wacker	March 2010
Something Can Stop the Juggernaut Part 1. Spider-Man's spider-sense leads him to the unconscious body of the Juggernaut. Cameo by Captain Universe.
628	Vengeance Is Mine	Stern/Weeks	Stephen Wacker	April 2010
Something Can Stop the Juggernaut Part 2. Spider-Man battles Captain Universe. Captain Universe subdues Spider-Man, who is saved by the Juggernaut.
629	With Greater Power	Stern/Weeks	Stephen Wacker	April 2010
Something Can Stop the Juggernaut Part 3. Spider-Man and the Juggernaut fight Captain Universe. Captain Universe causes so much damage that the Enigma Force abandons him and merges with the Juggernaut, who heals all the damage done.
630	SHED Part One	Quinones/Wells/Bachalo	Stephen Wacker	May 2010
Doctor Curt Connors loses control after being put under tremendous stress and turns into the Lizard again.
631	SHED Part Two	Wells/Bachalo	Stephen Wacker	May 2010
Spider-Man tracks down the Lizard and tries to get through to Doctor Connors. Connors and the Lizard battle for control, but the Lizard pushes Connors out and kills Billy Connors.
632	SHED Part Three	Wells/Bachalo	Stephen Wacker	May 2010
Spider-Man battles the Lizard.
633	SHED Part Four	Wells/Bachalo	Stephen Wacker	May 2010
The Lizard taps into the animalistic parts of civilians' brains, causing them to become violent and beat up Spider-Man. The Lizard frees their minds, however, after Spider-Man shows him a picture of Billy Connors. Peter returns home and the guilt and sadness in his voice free Aunt May from Mister Negative's control.
634	The Grim Hunt: Chapter One	Kelly/Stan Lee/J.M. DeMatteis/Lark/Martin/Fiumara	Stephen Wacker	June 2010
The Kravinoff family captures Mattie Franklin and Madame Web and hunt down Spider-Woman, Kaine and Spider-Man.
635	The Grim Hunt: Chapter Two	Kelly/Lee/DeMatteis/Lark/Martin/Fiumara	Stephen Wacker	June 2010
Kaine helps Peter save Anya Corazon/Spider-Girl from the hunters. The Chameleon, disguised as Ezekiel, leads Spider-Man to the rest of the hunters, who sacrifice Spider-Man to resurrect Kraven the Hunter.
636	The Grim Hunt: Chapter Three	Kelly/Lee/DeMatteis/Lark/Martin/Fiumara	Stephen Wacker	July 2010
Kraven's resurrection goes incorrectly, because Kaine had sacrificed himself to save Peter and the hunters had sacrificed Kaine, not Spider-Man, for the resurrection.
637	The Grim Hunt: Conclusion	Kelly/Lee/DeMatteis/Lark/Martin/Fiumara	Stephen Wacker	July 2010
Enraged at the death of Kaine, Spider-Man dons his black costume and defeats Kraven. Spider-Man is about to kill Kraven, but is stopped by Spider-Woman.
638	One Moment In Time: Something Old	Joe Quesada/Paolo Rivera	Stephen Wacker	July 2010
Part 1 of 4. Explains how the changes at the end of "One More Day" happened. A pigeon frees a criminal from police custody. Peter stops the criminal, but in doing so, is knocked unconscious, thus missing the wedding.
639	One Moment In Time: Something New	Quesada/Rivera	Stephen Wacker	Aug. 2010
Part 2 of 4. Explains how the changes at the end of "One More Day" happened. Peter saves Aunt May from her bullet wound with CPR.
640	One Moment In Time: Something Borrowed	Quesada/Rivera	Stephen Wacker	Aug. 2010
Part 3 of 4. Explains how the changes at the end of "One More Day" happened. The same criminal that caused Peter to miss his wedding attacks Mary Jane. Peter goes to Doctor Strange to make everyone forget his secret identity.
641	One Moment In Time: Something Blue	Quesada/Rivera	Stephen Wacker	Aug. 2010
Part 4 of 4. Explains how the changes at the end of "One More Day" happened. Doctor Strange, Iron Man and Mr. Fantastic erase knowledge of Peter's secret identity from everyone in the world except Peter and MJ.
642	Origin of the Species Part One	Waid/Azaceta	Stephen Wacker	Sept. 2010
During an attack by Tombstone and Shocker, Lily Hollister gives birth to Stanley Osborn, who is captured by Doctor Octopus.
643	Origin of the Species Part Two	Waid/Azaceta	Stephen Wacker	Sept. 2010
Electro and the Sandman chase Spider-Man, trying to steal the child.
644	Origin of the Species Part Three	Waid/Azaceta	Stephen Wacker	Sept. 2010
The Vulture, the Rhino and Mysterio attack Spider-Man, while Doctor Octopus watches from afar. Spider-Man gives the baby to the Chameleon, who is disguised as Harry Osborn. The Chameleon tricks Spider-Man into thinking the baby is dead.
645	Origin of the Species Part Four	Waid/Azaceta	Stephen Wacker	Oct. 2010
Spider-Man goes on a rampage after thinking the baby is dead. Spider-Man tracks down the Chameleon, who tells him that the Lizard has the baby.
646	Origin of the Species Part Five	Waid/Azaceta	Stephen Wacker	Oct. 2010
Doctor Octopus and Spider-Man chase the Lizard. The Lizard and Spider-Man find out that the child is not Norman Osborn's. Doctor Octopus and the Lizard fight. Spider-Man delivers the baby to Harry Osborn and reveals that he is the father.
647	Brand New Day: Epilogue	Various	Stephen Wacker	Nov. 2010
End of "Brand New Day". Carlie and Peter start dating. Harry and Stanley Osborn go into hiding.

== The Amazing Spider-Man #648–700 (November 2010 – December 2012) ==
Note: During the "Big Time" storyline, two issues of The Amazing Spider-Man were published each month at the increased length of 30 pages each (compared to the traditional 22 pages).

Issue #	Title	Author / Illustrator	Editor	Release date
648	Big Time Part 1	Dan Slott/Paul Tobin/Humberto Ramos/Clayton Henry	Stephen Wacker	Nov. 2010
Peter is hired to work at Horizon Labs.
649	Big Time Part 2: Kill to be You	Slott/Ramos	Stephen Wacker	Nov. 2010
Phil Urich becomes the newest Hobgoblin.
650	Big Time Part 3: The Final Lesson	Slott/Ramos	Stephen Wacker	Dec. 2010
Spider-Man battles the new Hobgoblin. Guest appearance by Black Cat. First appearance of the stealth suit.
651	Big Time Part 4: The Sting that Never Goes Away	Slott/Ramos	Stephen Wacker	Dec. 2010
Spider-Man and the Black Cat vs. the new Hobgoblin.
652	Revenge of the Spider-Slayer Part One: Army of Insects	Slott/Stefano Caselli	Stephen Wacker	Jan. 2011
Alistair Smythe returns with an army of Spider-Slayers. Appearance by the Scorpion.
653	Revenge of the Spider-Slayer Part Two: All You Love Will Die	Slott/Caselli	Stephen Wacker	Feb. 2011
Spider-Man and the New Avengers struggle to fight off the invasion of the Spider-Slayers.
654	Revenge of the Spider-Slayer Part Three: Self-Inflicted Wounds	Slott/Caselli	Stephen Wacker	Feb. 2011
Alistair Smythe kills Marla Jameson.
654.1	Flashpoint	Slott/Ramos	Stephen Wacker	Feb. 2011
Story starring Agent Venom.
655	No One Dies Part One: Awakening	Slott/Marcos Martin	Stephen Wacker	Feb. 2011
Catalyzed by Marla Jameson's death, Spider-Man is plagued by visions of the people he could not save and swears an oath that as long as he is there, he will not let anyone die.
656	No One Dies Part Two: Resolve	Slott/Martin	Stephen Wacker	March 2011
First appearance of Massacre.
657	Torch Song	Slott/Martin/Ty Templeton	Stephen Wacker	March 2011
Spider-Man hangs out with the Fantastic Four, due to Johnny Storm's death in FF #587, and has an awakening with them.
658	Peter Parker: The Fantastic Spider-Man; Can't Get the Service Part One	Slott/Javier Pulido	Stephen Wacker	April 2011
Spider-Man joins the Future Foundation, the renamed Fantastic Four.
659	Fantastic Voyage Part One; Can't Get the Service Part Two	Slott/Caselli	Stephen Wacker	April 2011
Continuation of Spider-Man's first mission with the FF.
660	Fantastic Voyage Part Two; Can't Get the Service Part Three	Slott/Caselli	Stephen Wacker	April 2011
Spider-Man's teams up with the FF against the Sinister Six.
661	The Substitute Part One; Just Another Day	Christos Gage/Reilly Brown	Stephen Wacker	May 2011
Spider-Man serves as a substitute teacher for Avengers Academy.
662	The Substitute Part Two; Magnetic Man in The Choice	Gage/Brown	Stephen Wacker	May 2011
Spider-Man continues his battle with the Psycho-Man and tries to help out Avengers Academy.
663	The Return of Anti-Venom Part One: The Ghost of Jean DeWolffe; Thanks...but No Thanks	Slott/Giuseppe Camuncoli	Stephen Wacker	June 2011
Anti-Venom and a new vigilante named the Wraith target Mister Negative's criminal empire.
664	The Return of Anti-Venom Part Two: Revelation Day	Slott/Camuncoli	Stephen Wacker	June 2011
Mister Negative's identity as Martin Li is revealed to the public, the Wraith's identity is revealed as Captain Watanabe to Carlie Cooper and Spider-Man.
665	Crossroads	Slott/Ryan Stegman	Stephen Wacker	July 2011
Aunt May and J. Jonah Jameson Sr. move to Boston.
666	The One and Only	Slott/Caselli	Stephen Wacker	July 2011
Spider-Island Prelude. Return of the Jackal.
667	Spider-Island Part One: The Amazing Spider-Manhattan	Slott/Ramos	Stephen Wacker	Aug. 2011
Everyone in Manhattan is given spider-powers.
668	Spider-Island Part Two: Peter Parker – The Unspectacular Spider-Man	Slott/Ramos	Stephen Wacker	Aug. 2011
Peter Parker broadcasts to the world that he has spider-powers and that everyone needs to use them responsibly. Appearance by Anti-Venom.
669	Spider-Island Part Three: Arachnotopia	Slott/Ramos	Stephen Wacker	Sept. 2011
Spider-Man battles a six-armed Shocker. The Queen is revealed as the mastermind behind the new spider-powers.
670	Spider-Island Part Four: Spiders, Spiders Everywhere	Slott/Ramos	Stephen Wacker	Sept. 2011
J. Jonah Jameson and Mary Jane are given spider-powers. All the people with new spider-powers turn into Spiders, except Mary Jane. Jameson tries to kill Smythe. Anti-Venom battles Venom.
671	Spider-Island Part Five: A New Hope	Slott/Ramos	Stephen Wacker	Oct. 2011
Mr. Fantastic uses Anti-Venom to create a cure for the new Spiders. Spider-Man battles Kaine, who has been transformed into a Spider and is being controlled by the Jackal.
672	Spider-Island Part Six: Boss Battle	Slott/Ramos	Stephen Wacker	Oct. 2011
Spider-Man gives the cures to Kaine and gives him the stealth suit. Captain America leads the Avengers and the Fantastic Four against the Queen. Spider-Man uses the Spider-Slayer robots to distribute the Anti-Venom cure. Kaine kills the Queen.
673	The Naked City	Slott/Caselli	Stephen Wacker	Nov. 2011
Spider-Island Epilogue. The heroes clean up the aftermath of the battle. Carlie breaks up with Peter after finding out that he is Spider-Man. Doctor Strange tells Peter that his spell was broken when Peter told everyone to use his powers responsibly on TV. After a talk with Robbie, J. Jonah Jameson thanks Spider-Man for saving them by shining blue and red colors across the entire Empire State Building.
674	Great Heights Part One: Trust Issues	Slott/Camuncoli	Stephen Wacker	Nov. 2011
Return of the original Vulture.
675	Great Heights Part Two: Partners In Crime	Slott/Camuncoli	Stephen Wacker	Dec. 2011
The Vulture fits a bunch of kids with wings and battles Spider-Man.
676	Tomorrow the World!	Slott/Ramos	Stephen Wacker	Dec. 2011
Doctor Octopus leads the Sinister Six into battle against MODOK Superior and the Intelligencia. Spider-Man does not appear in this issue.
677	The Devil and Details Part One	Mark Waid/Emma Rios	Stephen Wacker	Jan. 2012
Spider-Man and Daredevil work together to prove that Black Cat has been framed for stealing technology from Horizon Labs. Part Two of this story is in Daredevil (vol. 3) #8.
678	I Killed Tomorrow Part One: Schrödinger's Catastrophe	Slott/Ramos	Stephen Wacker	Jan. 2012
Spider-Man glimpses a future in which he is absent for one day and sees the entire city in ruins. He figures out that the disaster happened at 3:10 AM the next day and tries to stop it.
679	I Killed Tomorrow Part Two: A Date with Predestiny	Slott/Ramos	Stephen Wacker	Feb. 2012
Peter realizes that he was needed as Peter Parker, not Spider-Man, to save the city, by closing the machine that showed him the future in the first place.
679.1	Morbid Curiosity	Christopher Yost/Matthew Clark/Tom Palmer	Stephen Wacker	Feb. 2012
Story starring Morbius.
680	Road Trip...in Space!	Slott/Yost/Camuncoli	Stephen Wacker	Feb. 2012
Spider-Man and the Human Torch go to space to rescue John Jameson from a spaceship hijacked by Doctor Octopus and the Sinister Six.
681	Horizon, We Have a Problem	Slott/Yost/Camuncoli	Stephen Wacker	March 2012
Doctor Octopus uses his Octobots to control the crewmates to fight Spider-Man. Spider-Man safely lands the spaceship in the water. Doctor Octopus says that it is time for his master plan.
682	Ends of the Earth Part One: My World on Fire	Slott/Caselli	Stephen Wacker	March 2012
Doctor Octopus advertises to the world a technological scheme to stop global warming. Spider-Man sees through this scheme, so he creates new armor and calls for the Avengers to assemble.
683	Ends of the Earth Part Two: Earth's Mightiest	Slott/Caselli	Stephen Wacker	April 2012
Spider-Man and the Avengers fight the Sinister Six (Doctor Octopus, Sandman, Chameleon, Rhino, Electro, and Mysterio), but are defeated.
684	Ends of the Earth Part Three: Sand Trap	Slott/Ramos	Stephen Wacker	April 2012
Silver Sable returns to save Spider-Man and Black Widow. Spider-Man, Silver Sable and the Black Widow fight and defeat Sandman in the Sahara Desert.
685	Ends of the Earth Part Four: Global Menace	Slott/Ramos	Stephen Wacker	May 2012
Doctor Octopus has convinced the whole world that he is the savior and Spider-Man is stopping him from saving the world. Doctor Octopus sends S.H.I.E.L.D. agents and supervillains around the world to hunt down Spider-Man. In response, Spider-Man recruits heroes from around the world. Doctor Octopus convinces Spider-Man that he has destroyed half of the world.
686	Ends of the Earth Part Five: From the Ashes of Defeat	Slott/Caselli	Stephen Wacker	May 2012
Doctor Octopus accidentally reveals that the destruction they see is an illusion created by Mysterio. Spider-Man convinces Mysterio to turn against Doctor Octopus and lead them to his base. However, Doctor Octopus uses his Octobots to control the Avengers to battle Spider-Man's team. Spider-Man realizes that Octavius is using the things Peter created at Horizon Labs for his scheme.
687	Ends of the Earth Part Six: Everyone Dies	Slott/Caselli	Stephen Wacker	June 2012
Mysterio frees the Avengers from the control of Doctor Octopus. Thor, Iron Man and the Red Hulk destroy the missiles launched by Doctor Octopus. The Rhino seemingly kills Silver Sable. Spider-Man defeats and saves Octavius.
688	No Turning Back Part One: The Win Column	Slott/Camuncoli	Stephen Wacker	June 2012
Morbius tries to develop a cure for the Lizard at Horizon Labs.
689	No Turning Back Part Two: Cold Blooded	Slott/Camuncoli	Stephen Wacker	July 2012
Morbius cures Dr. Connors, but the mind of the Lizard is still in control.
690	No Turning Back Part Three: Natural State	Slott/Camuncoli	Stephen Wacker	July 2012
The Lizard turns everybody at Horizon Labs into Lizards.
691	No Turning Back Part Four: Human Error	Slott/Camuncoli	Stephen Wacker	Aug. 2012
Spider-Man stabs the Lizard with a cure to turn him back into Connors. Connors' mind is restored, but his body is not. The Kingpin has Tiberius Stone steal spider-sense jammers from Horizon labs. Roderick Kingsley, the original Hobgoblin, hears about the new Hobgoblin.
692	Alpha Part One: Point of Origin	Various	Stephen Wacker	Aug. 2012
Extra-length issue with multiple stories to celebrate the 50th anniversary of Spider-Man's first appearance. Andy Maguire gains superpowers from a failed experiment at Horizon Labs and becomes the first Alpha-level threat.
693	Alpha Part Two: That Something Special	Slott/Ramos	Stephen Wacker	Sept. 2012
The Jackal captures Alpha and creates clones of him, but since his power is not in his blood, the clones are useless. Peter realizes that Andy is what he would have been if Uncle Ben had not died and he had not learned to be responsible.
694	Alpha Part Three: The Final Grade	Slott/Ramos	Stephen Wacker	Sept. 2012
Spider-Man and the Avengers call in Alpha to help defeat Terminus. Peter saves Aunt May and J. Jonah Jameson Sr. and removes Alpha's powers. Roderick Kingsley returns to New York.
695	Danger Zone Part One: Warning Signs	Slott/Gage/Camuncoli	Stephen Wacker	Oct. 2012
Tiberius Stone uses the spider-sense jammers while the new Hobgoblin is fighting Spider-Man, but instead of jamming his spider-sense, it enhances Peter's spider-sense and Madame Web's seer abilities. Phil Urich captures Peter after realizing his connection with Spider-Man.
696	Danger Zone Part Two: Key to the Kingdom	Slott/Gage/Camuncoli	Stephen Wacker	Oct. 2012
The Kingpin holds Peter Parker hostage to get his boss, Max Modell, to deliver him the Goblin Key. Roderick Kingsley finds out that Phil Urich is the new Hobgoblin and fights him, threatening to kill Phil's girlfriend, Norah Winters. Both Hobgoblins are forced to team up once Peter and Max escape with the key.
697	Danger Zone Part Three: War of the Goblins	Slott/Gage/Camuncoli	Stephen Wacker	Nov. 2012
The two Hobgoblins corner Peter and Max, who hide in Norman Osborn's storage. Peter and Max escape and destroy Osborn's lair. Kingsley defeats Phil, but realizing he has potential, he lets him live, on the condition that he pays him a cut out of every crime he commits.
698	Dying Wish Prelude: Day in the Life	Slott/Richard Elson	Stephen Wacker	Nov. 2012
Doctor Octopus asks for Peter Parker in the Raft on his deathbed. It is revealed that Octavius swapped minds with Peter, so his mind was in Spider-Man's body and Peter's mind was in his.
699	Dying Wish: Outside the Box	Slott/Ramos	Stephen Wacker	Dec. 2012
Peter finds out that Octavius used a mind-swapping Octobot during his fight with the Hobgoblins to switch their minds. The Sinister Six break Doctor Octopus's body out of jail, which has Peter's mind in it.
699.1	Enter: Morbius – The Living Vampire	Slott/Joe Keatinge/Marco Checchetto/Valentine De Landro	Stephen Wacker	Dec. 2012
As Morbius the Living Vampire escapes the Raft, his childhood and growing-up years backstory is revealed.
700	Dying Wish: Suicide Run	Slott/Ramos	Stephen Wacker	Dec. 2012
Trapped in the dying body of Otto Octavius, Peter hunts down Spider-Man in order to switch his and Otto's minds back. Peter fails and Doctor Octopus, in Peter's body, defeats him. Peter uses an Octobot to try and swap their minds back, but fails. However, the Octobot links Peter and Otto's minds and Peter's entire life, memories, and defining moments flash through Otto's mind. Otto is overwhelmed and asks Peter why, through so much grief and tragedy, did he continue to fight? Peter teaches Otto one last lesson: with great power, there must also come great responsibility. Peter Parker dies and Otto Octavius, understanding Spider-Man at last, takes up the mantle of the Superior Spider-Man.
700.1	Frost Part One	David Morrell/Klaus Janson	Stephen Wacker	Dec. 2013
A massive blizzard hits and Peter has to reach Aunt May, who is trapped in her house with no power or heating. Note: this issue takes place after the events of The Superior Spider-Man.
700.2	Frost Part Two	Morrell/Janson	Stephen Wacker	Dec. 2013
On his way to Aunt May's house, Peter is delayed constantly by people that need to be saved. Peter tires before reaching Aunt May's house, but sees a vision of Uncle Ben as he walks and, following it, leads him to Aunt May's house, where Peter nurses her back to health. Note: this issue takes place after the events of The Superior Spider-Man.
700.3	The Black Lodge Part One: Convalescence; Cat & Mouse	Joe Casey/Timmothy Green II	Stephen Wacker	Dec. 2013
A criminal hospital sees Spider-Man's heavily burnt body after his battle with Firebrand and thinks it is the body of Firebrand. Spider-Man starts to regain his health when he realizes where he is. The head doctor of the hospital reveals that he knows he brought in Spider-Man. Back-up story with Spider-Man and the Black Cat. Note: this issue takes place after the events of The Superior Spider-Man.
700.4	The Black Lodge Part Two: Voluntary Discharge	Casey/Green II	Stephen Wacker	Dec. 2013
Spider-Man battles the Shocker and several other villains. The Black Lodge is destroyed. Back-up story about a young kid being bullied. Note: this issue takes place after the events of The Superior Spider-Man.
700.5	Spider-Man & the Human Torch Save the Universe; What Would Spider-Man Do?	Brian Reed/Sean Chen	Stephen Wacker	Dec. 2013
Future Ben Grimm plays a joke on Spider-Man and the Fantastic Four, making them think that a device that would destroy the universe would be activated. In a second story, a kid is shot trying to save Spider-Man. Peter is wracked with guilt, visiting him in the hospital. The kid reveals that he looked up to Spider-Man as his hero ever since he saw him save a girl from being hit by a bus. Note: this issue takes place after the events of The Superior Spider-Man.

== The Amazing Spider-Man #701–801 (January 2013 – June 2018) ==
=== Superior Spider-Man (vol. 1) #1–33 (January 2013 – April 2014) ===
Issue #	Title	Author / Illustrator	Editor	Release date
1 | 701	Hero or Menace?	Dan Slott/Ryan Stegman	Stephen Wacker	Jan. 2013
Otto faces off against the new "Sinister Six" (Boomerang, Shocker, Speed Demon, the Living Brain, Overdrive, and a new version of Beetle). Otto is about to kill Boomerang, but Peter, whose mind is still alive, unknown to Otto, stops him.
2 | 702	The Peter Principle	Slott/Stegman	Stephen Wacker	Jan. 2013
"Peter" and MJ reunite, but Otto realizes that they both need to let go of each other. Carlie starts to suspect the truth about this sudden "change" in Peter.
3 | 703	Everything You Know is Wrong	Slott/Stegman	Stephen Wacker	Feb. 2013
Otto fights the Vulture. The Vulture uses children to fight and Otto is forced to hit a child, causing him to remember his own father beating him. Otto goes berserk and almost kills the Vulture.
4 | 704	The Aggressive Approach	Slott/Giuseppe Camuncoli	Stephen Wacker	Feb. 2013
Massacre escapes from Ravencroft and kills Dr. Ashley Kafka. Otto returns to Empire State University to complete Peter's doctorate. The Green Goblin appears at the end of the issue.
5 | 705	Emotional Triggers	Slott/Camuncoli	Stephen Wacker	March 2013
First appearance of Anna Maria Marconi. Otto kills Massacre.
6 | 706	Joking Hazard	Slott/Humberto Ramos	Stephen Wacker	March 2013
Otto brutalizes Screwball and Jester. The Avengers suspect something is wrong with Spider-Man.
6.AU	Doomsday Scenario	Christos Gage/Dexter Soy	Ellie Pyle	March 2013
An Age of Ultron tie-in. Spider-Man works with Iron Man and Quicksilver to send Ultron's bots to the Negative Zone.
7 | 707	Troubled Mind Part 1: Right-Hand Man	Slott/Ramos	Stephen Wacker	April 2013
Peter gains minimal control of his body. Otto heavily beats up Cardiac. The Avengers confront Spider-Man.
8 | 708	Troubled Mind Part 2: Proof Positive	Slott/Ramos	Stephen Wacker	April 2013
The Avengers' tests confirm that Spider-Man is himself, but Otto notices an anomaly in his brain and realizes that Peter's mind is still alive.
9 | 709	Troubled Mind Part 3: Gray Matters	Slott/Stegman	Stephen Wacker	May 2013
Otto enters Peter's brain and they battle for control of Peter's body. Otto wins and erases all of Peter's memories.
10 | 710	Independence Day	Slott/Stegman/Marcos Martin	Stephen Wacker	May 2013
Otto fights several crime lords. The Green Goblin hacks Otto's Spider-Bot network.
11 | 711	No Escape Part 1: A Lock For Every Key	Slott/Gage/Camuncoli	Stephen Wacker	June 2013
Alistair Smythe escapes execution.
12 | 712	No Escape Part 2: Lockdown	Slott/Gage/Camuncoli	Stephen Wacker	June 2013
Otto fights Boomerang, the Vulture and the Scorpion.
13 | 713	No Escape Part 3: The Slayers & the Slain	Slott/Gage/Camuncoli	Stephen Wacker	July 2013
Otto kills Alistair Smythe and blackmails J. Jonah Jameson into giving him control of the Raft.
14 | 714	A Blind Eye	Slott/Ramos	Stephen Wacker	July 2013
Spider-Man attacks Shadowland, the Kingpin's stronghold, with his army of Spider-Robots. The Kingpin fakes his death.
15 | 715	Run, Goblin, Run! Part 1: The Tinkerer's Apprentice	Slott/Ramos	Stephen Wacker	Aug. 2013
Carlie realizes "Peter" is lying about where he gets his money from. Spider-Man reveals to the public that Phil Urich is the Hobgoblin.
16 | 716	Run, Goblin, Run! Part 2: Kill Phil	Slott/Ramos	Stephen Wacker	Aug. 2013
The Green Goblin makes Phil Urich the Goblin Knight.
17 | 717	Let's Do the Time Warp Again	Slott/Stegman	Stephen Wacker	Sept. 2013
Guest-starring Spider-Man 2099.
18 | 718	Smack to the Future	Slott/Stegman	Stephen Wacker	Sept. 2013
Spider-Man 2099 has to save Tiberius Stone from Otto.
19 | 719	1.21 Giga-Whats?!	Slott/Stegman	Stephen Wacker	Oct. 2013
Horizon Labs is destroyed and Alchemax is formed. Carlie finds out that Spider-Man is getting his money from the secret account of Otto Octavius.
20 | 720	Spidey Still Standing	Slott/Camuncoli/John Dell	Stephen Wacker	Oct. 2013
"Spider-Man" beats up Black Cat and creates Parker Industries. "Peter" is accused of plagiarism. Carlie finds proof that Doctor Octopus is Spider-Man.
21 | 721	Lethal Ladies	Slott/Camuncoli/Dell	Stephen Wacker	Nov. 2013
"Spider-Man" battles Stunner. Carlie is kidnapped by the Green Goblin. "Peter" is cleared of plagiarism.
22 | 722	Darkest Hours Part 1: Face to Face	Slott/Gage/Ramos	Stephen Wacker	Nov. 2013
Otto fights Agent Venom.
23 | 723	Darkest Hours Part 2: Complications	Slott/Gage/Ramos	Stephen Wacker	Dec. 2013
Otto heals Aunt May's disability and separates the Venom symbiote from Flash Thompson. The symbiote locks onto Otto and becomes Superior Venom.
24 | 724	Darkest Hours Part 3: Dark Embrace	Slott/Gage/Ramos	Stephen Wacker	Dec. 2013
"Peter" confronts Aunt May over her reaction towards Anna Maria.
25 | 725	Darkest Hours Part 4: Before the Dawn	Slott/Gage/Ramos	Stephen Wacker	Jan. 2014
Superior Venom fights the Avengers. As Otto struggles to get the symbiote off, Peter Parker, whose mind is revealed to still be alive, helps get the symbiote off, and it binds with Flash Thompson again. Otto tells Mary Jane and the Avengers that the Venom symbiote is responsible for his behavior, but the Avengers are not fooled. Roderick Kingsley challenges Norman Osborn.
26 | 726	The Goblin War	Slott/Ramos	Stephen Wacker	Jan. 2014
Goblin Nation prelude. "Spider-Man" leaves the Avengers. Norman Osborn defeats a decoy Hobgoblin, believing he is Kingsley, but the Goblin Knight is left knowing the truth.
27 | 727	Goblin Nation Part One	Slott/Camuncoli	Stephen Wacker	Feb. 2014
The Green Goblin reveals that he knows Otto is Spider-Man and offers for Otto to join him. Otto refuses, so the Goblin destroys Spider-Island.
28 | 728	Goblin Nation Part Two	Slott/Camuncoli	Ellie Pyle	Feb. 2014
The Green Goblin continues to take over the city. Peter relives Otto's life and memories.
29 | 729	Goblin Nation Part Three	Slott/Gage/Camuncoli	Ellie Pyle	March 2014
The Green Goblin destroys all the places dear to Otto. J. Jonah Jameson deploys the Anti-Spider-Man Patrol, but the Goblin takes control of it. Spider-Man 2099 joins the fight.
30 | 730	Goblin Nation Part Four	Slott/Gage/Camuncoli	Nick Lowe	March 2014
Otto realizes that he has failed and it is his fault that the city is in ruins. In order to save Anna Maria from the Green Goblin, Otto restores Peter Parker to his body, sacrificing himself in the process.
31 | 731	Goblin Nation: Conclusion	Slott/Gage/Camuncoli	Nick Lowe	April 2014
Series finale! Peter Parker returns as Spider-Man to save Anna Marconi and defeats the Green Goblin/Norman Osborn, who gets away with the help of Liz Allan. Peter makes amends with Aunt May. J. Jonah Jameson resigns from being the Mayor.
32 | 732	Edge of Spider-Verse Part One	Slott/Gage/Camuncoli	Nick Lowe	Aug. 2014
Spider-Verse Prologue. The explosion of Horizon Labs in Superior Spider-Man #19 sends Otto to 2099. Otto builds equipment to travel to other dimensions and rescues other Spider-People. First appearance of Karn. Note: this issue was released after issues #1-6 of The Amazing Spider-Man (2014).
33 | 733	Edge of Spider-Verse Part Four	Slott/Gage/Camuncoli	Nick Lowe	Sept. 2014
Spider-Verse Prologue. Otto leads a team of Spider-People against Karn. Karn's backstory is revealed at the end. Note: this issue was released after issues #1-6 of The Amazing Spider-Man (2014).

=== The Amazing Spider-Man (vol. 3) #1–20 (April 2014 – August 2015) — Marvel NOW! ===
Issue #	Title	Author / Illustrator	Editor	Release date
1 | 734	Lucky to be Alive Part One; Recapturing that Old Spark; Crossed Paths; How My Stuff Works	Dan Slott/Humberto Ramos	Nick Lowe	April 2014
Peter finds his life in a mess after recovering his body from Doctor Octopus. Electro returns. Anna Maria finds out that Peter Parker is Spider-Man.
1.1	Learning to Crawl Part One: The Show Must Go On!	Slott/Ramon Perez	Nick Lowe	May 2014
Continues the events of Amazing Fantasy #15. Debut of Clash.
1.2	Learning to Crawl Part Two	Slott/Perez	Nick Lowe	June 2014
Peter struggles in school while Clash, who is a super fan of Spider-Man's, sets up a show for him.
1.3	Learning to Crawl Part Three	Slott/Perez	Nick Lowe	July 2014
Spider-Man battles Clash at the science fair.
1.4	Learning to Crawl Part Four	Slott/Perez	Nick Lowe	Aug. 2014
Peter's life improves as he quits being Spider-Man, but is forced to suit up again when Clash attacks the Daily Bugle. J. Jonah Jameson fires Peter.
1.5	Learning to Crawl Part Five	Slott/Perez	Nick Lowe	Sept. 2014
After a pep talk from Aunt May, Peter regains his confidence and defeats Clash.
2 | 735	Lucky to be Alive Part Two	Slott/Ramos	Nick Lowe	May 2014
The Avengers run tests on Spider-Man to make sure he is the real thing. An extra-powered Electro takes on Spider-Man, wanting revenge for what Doctor Octopus did to him when he was Spider-Man.
3 | 736	Lucky to be Alive Part Three	Slott/Ramos	Nick Lowe	June. 2014
Black Cat fights Spider-Man, wanting revenge for what Doctor Octopus did to her when he was Spider-Man.
4 | 737	Lucky to be Alive Part Four	Slott/Ramos	Nick Lowe	July 2014
An "Original Sin" tie-in issue. First appearance of Silk.
5 | 738	Lucky to be Alive Part Five	Slott/Ramos	Nick Lowe	Aug. 2014
An "Original Sin" tie-in issue. Spider-Man and Silk fight the Black Cat and Electro.
6 | 739	Lucky to be Alive Conclusion	Slott/Ramos	Nick Lowe	Sept. 2014
The Black Cat blows up Peter's supervillain curing machine. Spider-Man saves Electro.
7 | 740	Ms. Marvel Team-Up; Edge of Spider-Verse Part 7	Slott/Giuseppe Camuncoli	Nick Lowe	Oct. 2014
Spider-Man teams up with Ms. Marvel. Spider-UK appears.
8 | 741	Adventures in Babysitting; Edge of Spider-Verse Part 10	Slott/Camuncoli	Nick Lowe	Oct. 2014
One of the Inheritors attacks Mayday Parker's house in Earth-982, the MC2 universe, and kills Peter Parker.
9 | 742	Spider-Verse Part 1: The Gathering; The Feast	Slott/Oliver Coipel	Nick Lowe	Nov. 2014
Peter and Silk are recruited by a legion of Spider-People from other dimensions, who are rescuing Spiders around the multiverse from the wrath of the Inheritors.
10 | 743	Spider-Verse Part 2: Superior Force	Slott/Coipel	Nick Lowe	Nov. 2014
Peter, Silk, Spider-Ham, and a few others meet the Superior Spider-Man's team of Spider-People. The Inheritors find them and they are forced to escape.
11 | 744	Spider-Verse Part 3: Higher Ground	Slott/Coipel	Nick Lowe	Dec. 2014
Peter and Otto battle for leadership. The Inheritors invade the base of the Spider-People and Solus kills the Cosmic Spider-Man.
12 | 745	Spider-Verse Part 4: Anywhere but Here	Slott/Camuncoli	Nick Lowe	Jan. 2015
The Inheritors chase the Spiders across the multiverse. Silk finds a safe zone on Earth-3145, which the Inheritors cannot enter.
13 | 746	Spider-Verse Part 5: Spider-Men: No More	Slott/Camuncoli	Nick Lowe	Jan. 2015
All the Spiders unite and travel to Loomworld to confront the Inheritors. Solus is killed by Kaine.
14 | 747	Spider-Verse Part 6: Web Warriors	Slott/Camuncoli	Nick Lowe	Feb. 2015
Final battle between the Spiders and Inheritors. The Spiders trap the Inheritors on Earth-3145, a radiation-filled world. The Superior Spider-Man kills the Master Weaver.
15 | 748	Spider-Verse Epilogue	Slott/Camuncoli	Nick Lowe	Feb. 2015
The Superior Spider-Man realizes that he is going to die and Peter will take back his body in the future, and tries to destroy the Web of Life. The Master Weaver is revealed to be a future version of Karn. Karn becomes the Master Weaver again. The Superior Spider-Man is sent back in time to the explosion in The Superior Spider-Man #19.
16 | 749	The Graveyard Shift Part One: The Late, Late Mr. Parker	Slott/Christos Gage/Ramos	Nick Lowe	March 2015
Tiberius Stone hires the Ghost to sabotage Parker Industries.
16.1	Spiral Part One	Gerry Conway/Carlo Barberi	Nick Lowe	March 2015
A gang war breaks out due to the Kingpin's absence. Yuri Watanabe becomes Wraith again after a friend of hers is injured by Tombstone. Return of Mister Negative.
17 | 750	The Graveyard Shift Part Two: Trust Issues	Slott/Gage/Ramos	Nick Lowe	April 2015
The Ghost infiltrates Parker Industries.
17.1	Spiral Part Two	Conway/Barberi	Nick Lowe	April 2015
Spider-Man and Wraith battle Hammerhead and the Goblin King.
18 | 751	The Graveyard Shift Part Three: Trade Secrets	Slott/Gage/Ramos	Nick Lowe	May 2015
Spider-Man battles Ghost. The Parker Industries building is destroyed.
18.1	Spiral Part Three	Conway/Barberi	Nick Lowe	June 2015
Spider-Man and the Wraith stop a prison breakout for Tombstone and Hammerhead tipped off by Mister Negative, leading to a fight with the Black Cat and the Crime Master.
19.1	Spiral Part Four	Conway/Barberi	Nick Lowe	July 2015
The Ringmaster and his Circus of Crime return. Spider-Man and the Wraith fight the Ringmaster, unknowingly being manipulated by Mister Negative.
20.1	Spiral Conclusion	Conway/Barberi	Nick Lowe	Aug. 2015
Spider-Man stops the Wraith from killing Mister Negative. Spider-Man defeats Mister Negative.

=== Amazing Spider-Man: Renew Your Vows (vol. 1) #1–5 (June 2015 – September 2015) ===
Note: Amazing Spider-Man: Renew Your Vows is a Secret Wars tie-in miniseries set in an alternate universe where One More Day never happened. The miniseries is counted as part of the legacy numbering for The Amazing Spider-Man.

Issue #	Title	Author / Illustrator	Editor	Release date
1 | 752	Why Can't We Have Nice Things	Dan Slott/Various	Nick Lowe	June 2015
Regent has battled the X-Men and taken all of their powers. The Avengers battle Regent, who has led a Ryker's Island breakout, releasing Venom, amongst others. Spider-Man is forced to abandon the Avengers to protect his family from Venom. Spider-Man kills Venom when he threatens to kill Peter's daughter.
2 | 753	Because We Said So, That's Why	Slott/Adam Kubert	Nick Lowe	July 2015
Peter is still haunted by his murder of Eddie Brock. Spider-Man is forced to publicly return when his daughter's school is being attacked.
3 | 754	Calling a Family Meeting	Slott/Kubert	Nick Lowe	Aug. 2015
Regent sends the Sinister Six (Doctor Octopus, Vulture, Hobgoblin, Mysterio, Kraven the Hunter, and Shocker) after Spider-Man. Sandman, who is working for S.H.I.E.L.D., stalks them. Spider-Man fights the Sinister Six, but Annie and MJ are captured.
4 | 755	Daddy Has to Go Away for a While	Slott/Kubert	Nick Lowe	Aug. 2015
Spider-Man and the Sandman are captured by Regent. Annie and MJ are sent to the S.H.I.E.L.D. resistance base, where Hawkeye, Mockingbird, and the remaining superheroes come up with a plan to defeat Regent.
5 | 756	I'll Always Be There for You	Slott/Kubert	Nick Lowe	Sept. 2015
Final battle between the S.H.I.E.L.D. resistance and Regent. Regent is defeated.

=== The Amazing Spider-Man (vol. 4) #1–32 (October 2015 – September 2017) — All-New, All-Different Marvel ===
Issue #	Title	Author / Illustrator	Editor	Release date
1 | 757	Worldwide	Dan Slott/Giuseppe Camuncoli	Nick Lowe	Oct. 2015
Set after the events of Secret Wars, a technologically upgraded Spider-Man goes to Shanghai with Mockingbird, to advertise Parker Industries, when attacked by Zodiac. Doctor Octopus's mind is revealed to be in the Living Brain.
1.1	Amazing Grace Part One: A Wretch Like Me	Jose Molina/Simone Bianchi	Nick Lowe	Dec. 2015
After a man named Julio Rodriguez is mysteriously brought back from the dead, Spider-Man begins an investigation causing him to cross paths with the Santerians.
1.2	Amazing Grace Part Two: My Heart to Fear	Molina/Bianchi	Nick Lowe	Jan. 2016
The Santerians send Spider-Man to Cuba to find Julio Rodriguez, but he is ambushed.
1.3	Amazing Grace Part Three: Dangers, Toils, and Snares	Molina/Bianchi	Nick Lowe	Feb. 2016
Spider-Man escapes and continues his investigation, raising theological questions along the way.
1.4	Amazing Grace Part Four: Within the Veil	Molina/Bianchi/Andrea Broccardo	Nick Lowe	March 2016
As Spider-Man struggles with the theological implications of Julio's unexplainable resurrection, he finds out information about Julio's death and tracks him down.
1.5	Amazing Grace Part Five: Flesh and Heart Shall Fail	Molina/Bianchi/Broccardo	Nick Lowe	May 2016
Spider-Man keeps a constant watch on Julio, and realizes what is wrong with him. With some help from Iron Man, Spider-Man and the Santerians track down a possessed Julio, who is seen reviving people.
1.6	Amazing Grace Part Six: Lead Me Home	Molina/Bianchi/Broccardo	Nick Lowe	July 2016
Spider-Man and the Santerians battle Julio and the resurrected people. To stop Julio's master from coming to Earth, the Santerians kill Julio.
2 | 758	Water Proof	Slott/Camuncoli	Nick Lowe	Oct. 2015
Spider-Man and Prowler track down the Webware that Peter gave to Zodiac.
3 | 759	Friendly Fire	Slott/Camuncoli	Nick Lowe	Nov. 2015
Parker Industries buys the Baxter Building. The Human Torch, misunderstanding Peter's intentions, attacks him. Zodiac attacks S.H.I.E.L.D in order to kill one of their captured members.
4 | 760	High Priority	Slott/Camuncoli	Nick Lowe	Dec. 2015
Spider-Man abandons a S.H.I.E.L.D. mission to save Aunt May from the War Goblins in Africa.
5 | 761	Set in Stone	Slott/Christos Gage/Camuncoli	Nick Lowe	Dec. 2015
Spider-Man, Mockingbird, the Human Torch and the Prowler go to London to stop Scorpio, leader of Zodiac.
6 | 762	The Dark Kingdom Part One: Turnabout	Slott/Matteo Buffagni	Nick Lowe	Dec. 2015
The return of Mister Negative. Negative uses his corrupting touch to put Cloak and Dagger under his spell and sends them to capture Peter Parker.
7 | 763	The Dark Kingdom Part Two: Opposing Forces	Slott/Buffagni	Nick Lowe	Feb. 2016
Mister Negative uses his corrupting touch to turn Peter, but unbeknownst to him, it does not work, because he already used it once on Spider-Man. Spider-Man battles Cloak and Dagger.
8 | 764	The Dark Kingdom Part Three: Black and White	Slott/Buffagni	Nick Lowe	Feb. 2016
Spider-Man foils Mister Negative's scheme and frees Cloak and Dagger from his control. Mister Negative escapes.
9 | 765	Scorpio Rising Part One: One Way Trip	Slott/Camuncoli	Nick Lowe	March 2016
Spider-Man and Nick Fury fly into space to dismantle S.H.I.E.L.D. satellites, which were hacked by Scorpio, but are overwhelmed by Scorpio's defenses.
10 | 766	Scorpio Rising Part Two: Power Play	Slott/Camuncoli	Nick Lowe	April 2016
Spider-Man battles Scorpio.
11 | 767	Scorpio Rising Part Three: Signs From Above	Slott/Camuncoli	Nick Lowe	April 2016
Spider-Man traps Scorpio one year into the future after he sees Scorpio learning all the knowledge for the entire year.
12 | 768	Power Play Part 1: The Stark Contrast	Slott/Camuncoli	Nick Lowe	May 2016
Mary Jane returns. Spider-Man and Iron Man battle Regent.
13 | 769	Power Play Part 2: Civil War Reenactment	Slott/Camuncoli	Nick Lowe	June 2016
Spider-Man fights Iron Man. Regent captures Miles Morales.
14 | 770	Power Play Part 3: Avengers Assembled	Slott/Camuncoli	Nick Lowe	June 2016
Regent defeats, and gains the powers of, Ms. Marvel, Captain America (Sam Wilson), Nova, the Vision and Lady Thor.
15 | 771	Power Play Conclusion: Suit Yourself	Slott/Camuncoli	Nick Lowe	July 2016
The battle with Regent concludes. First appearance of Mary Jane as the Iron Spider.
16 | 772	Before Dead No More Part One: Whatever the Cost	Slott/Camuncoli	Nick Lowe	Aug. 2016
J. Jonah Jameson Sr. goes to the hospital. New U, a new medical company, heals a heavily injured Parker Industries employee, which sets off Peter's spider-sense and resurrects Marla Jameson, who had died in The Amazing Spider-Man #654.
17 | 773	Before Dead No More Part Two: Spark of Life	Slott/R.B. Silva	Nick Lowe	Aug. 2016
Peter sends the Prowler to investigate New U, but Prowler is ambushed by the new Electro. The new Jackal kills and brings Hobie back to life as a clone.
18 | 774	Before Dead No More Part Three: Full Otto	Slott/Silva	Nick Lowe	Sept. 2016
Doctor Octopus reveals how he put his mind in the Living Brain. After hearing how he was defeated in Superior Spider-Man #30, he has one final fight with Spider-Man, after which he realizes he needs to find New U to get a new body.
19 | 775	Before Dead No More Part Four: Change of Heart	Slott/Camuncoli	Nick Lowe	Oct. 2016
J. Jonah Jameson wants to use New U tech to heal his father, but both his father and Peter refuse because he does not trust New U, leading to J. Jonah Jameson Sr.'s death.
1	Dead No More: The Clone Conspiracy – Part One	Slott/Jim Cheung	Nick Lowe	Oct. 2016
After J. Jonah Jameson Sr.'s funeral, Peter breaks into the New U facility, where he faces Rhino, Doctor Octopus, and a cloned Gwen Stacy.
20 | 776	Spider-Man's Superior	Slott/Gage/Camuncoli	Nick Lowe	Oct. 2016
A Clone Conspiracy tie-in. Doctor Octopus explains to Spider-Man how he got his mind back into his old body.
2	Dead No More: The Clone Conspiracy – Part Two	Slott/Cheung	Nick Lowe	Nov. 2016
The Jackal shows Peter around the facility and all his clones of Spider-Man's villains and loved ones. Kaine and Spider-Gwen infiltrate New U, steal the Gwen Stacy clone, and set up at Horizon Labs.
21 | 777	Live Another Day	Slott/Gage/Camuncoli	Nick Lowe	Nov. 2016
A Clone Conspiracy tie-in. An exploration of how Kaine and Spider-Gwen infiltrated New U.
3	Dead No More: The Clone Conspiracy – Part Three	Slott/Cheung	Nick Lowe	Dec. 2016
Rhino and the new Electro attack Horizon Labs and battle Spider-Man, Spider-Gwen, and Kaine. After help from Kingpin, Spider-Man tracks down and fights the Jackal, who takes off his mask, revealing himself to be Ben Reilly, asking Peter to join him and help to resurrect Uncle Ben.
22 | 778	Seeing Red	Slott/Gage/Camuncoli	Nick Lowe	Dec. 2016
A Clone Conspiracy tie-in. Ben Reilly explains how he became the Jackal.
4	Dead No More: The Clone Conspiracy – Part Four	Slott/Cheung	Nick Lowe	Jan. 2017
Doc Ock and Anna Maria work to fix the clone degeneration problem. Ben Reilly shows Peter around a new underground town he's built for clones. When Peter rejects his offer to join him, the Jackal orders all of his cloned villains to attack him. Doctor Octopus activates the frequency that activates the Carrion virus, and all the clones begin to degenerate.
23 | 779	The Moment You Know	Slott/Gage/Camuncoli	Nick Lowe	Jan. 2017
A Clone Conspiracy tie-in. Peter talks to Gwen's clone, trying to explain his past actions.
5	Dead No More: The Clone Conspiracy – Part Five	Slott/Cheung	Nick Lowe	Feb. 2017
The Carrion virus spreads and begins to infect humans as well. Peter uses Parker Industries' Webware to broadcast a reverse frequency that counteracts the virus. Doctor Octopus and the Jackal appear to degenerate.
24 | 780	Night of the Jackals	Slott/Gage/Camuncoli	Nick Lowe	Feb. 2017
A Clone Conspiracy tie-in. Doctor Octopus uploads his mind into the photo-clone. Miles Warren becomes the Jackal again. Ben Reilly kills the Jackal.
N/A	Dead No More: The Clone Conspiracy Omega	Slott/Gage/Cory Smith	Nick Lowe	March 2017
Enraged after watching his wife die again, the Rhino rampages and fights Spider-Man. Kaine searches for Ben Reilly, not convinced of his death. The Lizard uses his formula to save his family from degeneration. Kingpin gives Spider-Man the location of Norman Osborn.
25 | 781	The Osborn Identity Part One: Bug Hunt	Slott/Stuart Immonen	Nick Lowe	March 2017
Spider-Man goes on a worldwide manhunt for Norman Osborn.
26 | 782	The Osborn Identity Part Two: Fight or Flight	Slott/Immonen	Nick Lowe	April 2017
Silver Sable returns after having seemingly died during Ends of the Earth.
27 | 783	The Osborn Identity Part Three: A Private War	Slott/Immonen	Nick Lowe	May 2017
Parker Industries invade Symakaria, which is under the rule of Norman Osborn. Norman Osborn launches a rocket full of Goblin serum.
28 | 784	The Osborn Identity Part Four: One-On-One	Slott/Immonen	Nick Lowe	June 2017
Peter squares off against Norman, who ends up escaping. S.H.I.E.L.D. stops the Goblin missile.
29 | 785	Secret Empire Part One: Rightful Ruler	Slott/Gage/Immonen	Nick Lowe	June 2017
A Secret Empire tie-in. Otto Octavius returns as the Superior Octopus, working for Hydra.
30 | 786	Secret Empire Part Two: Master Planning	Slott/Gage/Immonen	Nick Lowe	July 2017
A Secret Empire tie-in. Doctor Octopus chases Peter to Shanghai. Spider-Man fights Doctor Octopus.
31 | 787	Secret Empire Part Three: End of an Empire	Slott/Immonen	Nick Lowe	Aug. 2017
A Secret Empire tie-in. Peter destroys Parker Industries to keep it out of the hands of Doctor Octopus.
32 | 788	Personal Demon	Slott/Greg Smallwood	Nick Lowe	Sept. 2017
After his last defeat at the hands of Spider-Man, Norman Osborn tries to become the Green Goblin again, but fails. He goes to the Himalayas to gain the power of the Mystic Arts, but is deemed not worthy.

=== The Amazing Spider-Man #789–801 (October 2017 – June 2018) — Marvel Legacy ===
Issue #	Title	Author / Illustrator	Editor	Release date
789	Fall of Parker – Part 1: Fall of Parker	Dan Slott/Stuart Immonen	Nick Lowe	Oct. 2017
After the collapse of Parker Industries, Peter Parker deals with being the most hated man in New York.
790	Fall of Parker – Part 2: Breaking Point	Slott/Christos Gage/Immonen	Nick Lowe	Oct. 2017
The Human Torch confronts Peter about selling the Baxter Building.
791	Fall of Parker – Part 3: Back to Ground	Slott/Immonen	Nick Lowe	Nov. 2017
Peter gets a new job at the Daily Bugle.
792	Venom Inc. – Part 2	Slott/Mike Costa/Ryan Stegman	Nick Lowe	Dec. 2017
A Spider-Man/Venom crossover. Continuation from Amazing Spider-Man: Venom Inc. Alpha #1. Spider-Man and Flash Thompson, who is once again Anti-Venom, purge the Venom symbiote from Eddie Brock to track a hostile symbiote that has possessed Black Cat's entire mob. Story continues in Venom #159.
793	Venom Inc. – Part 4	Slott/Costa/Stegman	Nick Lowe	Dec. 2017
A Spider-Man/Venom crossover. Continuation from Venom #159. Venom, Anti-Venom, the Black Cat and Mania free Spider-Man from the control of the hostile symbiote of Lee Price. Story continues in Venom #16.
794	Threat Level: Red – Part 1: Last Chance	Slott/Gage/Immonen	Nick Lowe	Jan. 2018
Takes place exactly a year after The Amazing Spider-Man #767. Scorpio returns and fights Spider-Man. The Carnage symbiote is delivered to Norman Osborn.
795	Threat Level: Red – Part 2: The Favor	Slott/Gage/Mike Hawthorne	Nick Lowe	Feb. 2018
Spider-Man is summoned by Loki, who is now the new Sorcerer Supreme, on the matter of the favor Loki has owed him since The Amazing Spider-Man #504. Norman Osborn bonds with the Carnage symbiote, but they struggle over who should be in charge.
796	Threat Level: Red – Part 3: Higher Promises	Slott/Gage/Hawthorne	Nick Lowe	Feb. 2018
Spider-Man and Anti-Venom battle the Goblin King (Phil Urich). Norman Osborn comes to an agreement with the Carnage symbiote, putting him in complete control of their symbiosis.
797	Go Down Swinging – Part 1: The Loose Thread	Slott/Immonen	Nick Lowe	March 2018
Norman Osborn kills the Goblin King (Phil Urich) and captures J. Jonah Jameson to question him about Spider-Man's identity, after he forgot it due to the spell cast by Doctor Strange in The Amazing Spider-Man #641. When Jameson tells Norman that Spider-Man will always beat him no matter what the Goblin puts him through, he reminds Norman of when he threw Gwen Stacy off of the Brooklyn Bridge, killing her. This causes Norman to remember that Peter Parker is Spider-Man.
798	Go Down Swinging – Part 2: The Rope-A-Dope	Slott/Immonen	Nick Lowe	April 2018
First appearance of the Red Goblin. Spider-Man battles the Red Goblin and is easily defeated by the combination of the Goblin formula and the Carnage symbiote. Norman Osborn forces Peter to stop being Spider-Man, saying that he will kill everyone he loves if he does not.
799	Go Down Swinging – Part 3: The Ties That Bind	Slott/Immonen	Nick Lowe	April 2018
The Red Goblin goes after Harry Osborn and his family. Peter sends the Human Torch, Clash, Anti-Venom, Silk, and Miles Morales to fight the Goblin. Nothing except the Anti-Venom works on the Red Goblin, but everyone is defeated; Flash is forced to use his Anti-Venom to heal everyone rather than defeat the Goblin. The Red Goblin infects his own grandson, Normie Osborn, with the Carnage symbiote.
800	Go Down Swinging – Part 4: No Holds Barred	Slott/Nick Bradshaw/Humberto Ramos/Immonen/Giuseppe Camuncoli/Marcos Martin	Nick Lowe	May 2018
After Spider-Man breaks their deal, the Red Goblin goes after MJ and sends Normie Osborn after Aunt May. Trying to make amends, J. Jonah Jameson sends Venom to protect MJ and a Spider-Slayer to protect Aunt May. After losing to the Goblin, Eddie Brock gives Spider-Man the Venom symbiote. The Red Goblin tries to kill Aunt May, but Doctor Octopus hears of the plan and saves her, redeeming himself in Peter's eyes. Norman attacks the Osborn family to gain control of Alchemax, but Harry uses his old Goblin equipment to fight him. Spider-Man battles the Red Goblin, who reveals that when he assaulted MJ and May, he infected them with the symbiote and they would die at his command. However, Flash Thompson finds out Peter Parker is Spider-Man and uses the Anti-Venom to remove the symbiote from MJ and May. Spider-Man and Anti-Venom battle the Red Goblin. The Red Goblin kills Flash Thompson/Anti-Venom. Filled with rage, Spider-Man almost gives into the violence of the Venom symbiote, but Flash stops him with his final words, calling Peter his hero and friend. Peter appeals to Norman's ego, telling him that everyone will credit Carnage, not the Green Goblin, for Spider-Man's death. Carnage is gleeful upon hearing this, causing him and Norman to fight for control. Norman and Peter dispel their symbiotes preferring to fight man-to-man. Peter wins, and Carnage tries to re-bond with Norman but Peter causes a fire to prevent this. Jameson tries to kill Norman, but Peter jumps in front of and catches the bullet with his shoulder to prevent Jonah from becoming a murderer. Norman Osborn goes mad, believing that he is Cletus Kasady and Spider-Man is Norman Osborn. At Flash's funeral, Peter acknowledges Flash as the hero he looked up to.
801	There for You	Slott/Martin	Nick Lowe	June 2018
A reflection on the heroism of Spider-Man.

== The Amazing Spider-Man #802–894 (July 2018 – March 2022) ==
=== The Amazing Spider-Man (vol. 5) #1–74 (July 2018 – September 2021) — Fresh Start ===
Note: See Free Comic Book Day (2018): Amazing Spider-Man.

Issue #	Title	Author / Illustrator	Editor	Release date
1 | 802	Back to Basics: Part One	Nick Spencer/Ryan Ottley	Nick Lowe	July 2018
Spider-Man's reputation in the superhero community is spoiled when Kingpin publicly supports him. Peter is accused of plagiarism for a paper written by Doctor Octopus when he took over Peter's body and his doctorate is revoked. He is fired from the Daily Bugle and returns to college, where he is being taught by the Lizard. Spider-Man and the heroes of New York battle an alien invasion, which is really an illusion created by Mysterio. Peter and MJ reunite. First appearance of Kindred.
2 | 803	Back to Basics: Part Two	Spencer/Ottley	Nick Lowe	July 2018
Spider-Man battles Taskmaster and Black Ant.
3 | 804	Back to Basics: Part Three	Spencer/Ottley	Nick Lowe	Aug. 2018
The Isotope Genome Accelerator, which originally gave Peter his powers, splits him into Peter Parker and Spider-Man. Spider-Man battles the Tri-Sentinel.
4 | 805	Back to Basics: Part Four	Spencer/Ottley	Nick Lowe	Aug. 2018
Peter realizes that the Isotope Genome Accelerator has split his power and responsibility, so Spider-Man has all the power and Peter the responsibility. Mendel Stromm returns.
5 | 806	Back to Basics: Part Five	Spencer/Ottley	Nick Lowe	Sept. 2018
With the help of Kindred, Mendel Stromm unleashes an army of Tri-Sentinels on New York. Peter uses the Isotope Genome Accelerator to put his two personalities back together. Kindred kills Mendel Stromm. Kraven the Hunter returns.
6 | 807	A Trivial Pursuit: Part One	Spencer/Humberto Ramos	Nick Lowe	Sept. 2018
Boomerang takes Peter to the Bar With No Name, where he plays Spider-Man trivia with a group of inactive supervillains. Taskmaster and Black Ant capture Vulture.
7 | 808	A Trivial Pursuit: Part Two	Spencer/Ramos	Nick Lowe	Oct. 2018
Kingpin turns all of the supervillains in the bar against Boomerang and Peter, forcing them to work together to escape. Kindred forces Kingpin to kneel before him and promise to leave Peter alone, threatening him with the ghost of his dead wife.
8 | 809	Heist: Part One	Spencer/Ramos	Nick Lowe	Oct. 2018
The Thieves' Guild steals the battle items of many superheroes, including Spider-Man's web-shooters. Black Cat returns.
9 | 810	Heist: Part Two	Spencer/Ramos/Michele Bandini	Nick Lowe	Nov. 2018
The Black Cat reveals her history and knowledge of the Thieves' Guild. MJ joins a support group for people who keep superheroes' secrets, led by Jarvis.
10 | 811	Heist: Part Three	Spencer/Ramos/Bandini	Nick Lowe	Nov. 2018
Spider-Man and the Black Cat recover all the stolen items. MJ reflects her relationship with Peter. Peter reveals his identity to the Black Cat, which enrages Kindred.
11 | 812	Lifetime Achievement: Part One	Spencer/Ottley	Nick Lowe	Dec. 2018
Spider-Man and J. Jonah Jameson are attacked by the Enforcers after being invited to a banquet by the Kingpin. Appearance by Arcade.
12 | 813	Lifetime Achievement: Part Two	Spencer/Ottley	Nick Lowe	Dec. 2018
Arcade traps Spider-Man and Jameson in a virtual simulation of Jonah's life. Spider-Man battles the Scorpion, the Fly and the Spider-Slayer. The Big Man returns.
13 | 814	Lifetime Achievement: Part Three	Spencer/Ottley	Nick Lowe	Jan. 2019
The Big Man is revealed to be Frederick Foswell's son, who blames Spider-Man for his father's death in The Amazing Spider-Man #52. Jameson admits his guilt in Foswell's death and Spider-Man defeats the Big Man. Jameson calls the Kingpin a criminal and Spider-Man a hero. The Taskmaster and the Black Ant capture the Scorpion.
14 | 815	Family Matters: Part One	Spencer/Chris Bachalo	Nick Lowe	Jan. 2019
Kraven meets with Arcade. Spider-Man and Rhino battle the Taskmaster and the Black Ant. The Lizard has a falling out with his son. Aunt May has dinner with a homeless stranger.
15 | 816	Family Matters: Part Two	Spencer/Bachalo	Nick Lowe	Feb. 2019
Spider-Man saves Aunt May and a group of people from a collapsing restaurant, including a homeless person who then dies and is revealed to be Ned Leeds, who was resurrected during the Clone Conspiracy. Taskmaster and Black Ant capture Rhino.
16 | 817	Hunted: Prelude	Spencer/Ottley/Alberto Alburquerque	Nick Lowe	Feb. 2019
Kraven reveals what he has done since his resurrection in the Grim Hunt, and how his new son came to be. Billy Connors is captured by the Taskmaster and the Black Ant.
16.HU	Hunted	Spencer/Iban Coello	Nick Lowe	March 2019
A Hunted tie-in. The Black Cat tracks down the Taskmaster and the Black Ant and is captured when trying to rescue Billy Connors, as she reflects on her newly restored memories of her time with Spider-Man.
17 | 818	Hunted: Part One	Spencer/Ramos	Nick Lowe	March 2019
Spider-Man battles Kraven's son through hallucinogenic mists, causing him to see MJ being killed. Kraven's son uses this to defeat him and puts him with the rest of the captured animal-themed villains.
18 | 819	Hunted: Part Two	Spencer/Ramos	Nick Lowe	March 2019
Spider-Man and the villains are hunted by the robotic hunters created by Arcade and controlled by people. The Taskmaster betrays the Black Ant. Kindred narrates and watches over MJ.
18.HU	Hunted	Spencer/Ken Lashley	Nick Lowe	April 2019
A Hunted tie-in. Gibbon reflects on his life as he battles the hunter robots in his final fight and is killed, just as Spider-Man arrives to save him.
19 | 820	Hunted: Part Three	Spencer/Gerardo Sandoval	Nick Lowe	April 2019
The Vulture leads the group of supervillains. The Black Cat uses her bad luck powers to escape with Billy Connors. The Taskmaster captures the Lizard.
19.HU	Hunted	Spencer/Bachalo	Nick Lowe	April 2019
A Hunted tie-in. The Lizard allows himself to be captured so he can rescue his son Billy, as he is haunted by his memories. The Taskmaster captures Vermin.
20 | 821	Hunted: Part Four	Spencer/Ramos	Nick Lowe	April 2019
The Lizard fights Kraven's son. The Black Ant reveals to Spider-Man that when a robot hunter is destroyed, the person controlling it is killed. Spider-Man goes to confront Kraven, but is approached by clones of Vermin.
20.HU	Hunted	Spencer/Cory Smith	Nick Lowe	May 2019
A Hunted tie-in. Arcade tricks the Vulture into leading the villains into a trap. It is revealed that Arcade gave Vermin the ability to clone himself after capturing him.
21 | 822	Hunted: Part Five	Spencer/Sandoval	Nick Lowe	May 2019
Spider-Man is captured by Kraven and trapped with Curt Connors with a live feed of the Black Cat and Billy being hunted by Kraven's son. Curt reflects on his strained relationship with his son. Spider-Man is forced to remove the inhibitor chip from Curt, turning him into the Lizard again so he can save his son.
22 | 823	Hunted: Part Six	Spencer/Ramos	Nick Lowe	May 2019
Kraven frees Spider-Man and fights him, trying to turn him to his beliefs, that he must kill to survive and protect his close ones, when he sees the vision of MJ dying again. Spider-Man rejects Kraven, makes him look at the world through his eyes and rushes back home to make sure MJ is safe. Kraven's son sees Spider-Man and beats him to death. Kraven, finally understanding his greatest enemy and realizing the truth in his belief, frees everyone and becomes Spider-Man. Kraven's son takes off Spider-Man's mask and realizes he has killed his father.
23 | 824	Hunted: Epilogue	Spencer/Ottley	Nick Lowe	June 2019
Kraven's son is enraged after realizing he killed his father. Peter finds that MJ is safe and Kindred cannot believe that Peter thought he would kill her. The heroes of New York stop the escaped supervillains. The Taskmaster saves the Black Ant. Kraven's son finds a good-bye note from his father and takes up the mantle of Kraven the Hunter. The Chameleon returns.
24 | 825	One-on-One	Spencer/Ottley	Nick Lowe	June 2019
Mysterio is being interrogated by his therapist and goes through all the key moments of his life, including when he committed suicide in "Daredevil: Guardian Devil". Mysterio reveals that Kindred brought him back from Hell. Kindred kills Mysterio and finally reveals himself to Peter. Peter sees this all in his nightmares.
25 | 826	Opening Night	Spencer/Ottley	Nick Lowe	July 2019
The events of the previous issue are revealed to be an illusion created by Mysterio under the instruction of Kindred. MJ is hired for a movie that is secretly directed by Mysterio on the orders of Kindred. Spider-Man battles a bunch of robots and reunites Curt Connors with his family.
26 | 827	Who Run the World?	Spencer/Kev Walker	Nick Lowe	July 2019
The Sinister Syndicate (Beetle, Doctor Octopus, the White Rabbit, Electro, Scorpia and the Trapster) goes after Boomerang. The Kingpin is furious at Boomerang when finding an empty box with a note from him.
27 | 828	Who Run the World?: Part Two	Spencer/Walker	Nick Lowe	Aug. 2019
Spider-Man and Boomerang fight the Sinister Syndicate. Randy's girlfriend is revealed to be the Beetle.
28 | 829	Who Run the World?: Part Three	Spencer/Walker	Nick Lowe	Aug. 2019
The Sinister Syndicate captures Boomerang. The Beetle betrays them to sell him to the Kingpin, but lets him go after finding out why the Kingpin is after him.
29 | 830	Arrivals/Departures	Spencer/Francesco Manna	Nick Lowe	Sept. 2019
Peter is forced to help his sister save a colleague from the Chameleon, causing him to miss seeing off MJ for her flight. He reveals that he was planning on proposing to her.
30 | 831	Absolute Carnage: Part One	Spencer/Ottley	Nick Lowe	Sept. 2019
An Absolute Carnage tie-in. Spider-Man defends Dylan Brock and Normie Osborn from Norman Osborn, who is part of the Carnage hive. Previously, Norman was in the Ravencroft Institute, believing himself to be Cletus Kasady after the events of The Amazing Spider-Man #800, where he is visited by Kindred, who chides him about his madness and the effects it has on everyone.
31 | 832	Absolute Carnage: Part Two	Spencer/Ottley	Nick Lowe	Oct. 2019
An Absolute Carnage tie-in. Spider-Man is brutally beaten by Norman-Carnage and remembers the events of The Amazing Spider-Man #121. Kindred continues his conversation with Norman about the past and puts something in him that later knocks Norman unconscious while he is fighting Spider-Man as Carnage. Spider-Man defeats Norman; Norman tells Kindred that he is proud of him.
32 | 833	Running Late	Spencer/Patrick Gleason	Nick Lowe	Oct. 2019
Miguel O'Hara, Spider-Man of the year 2099, has come back to the past and is searching for Peter Parker to save the future. Spider-Man and Teresa Parker search for the Chameleon and fight the Foreigner. Appearance by Silver Sable.
33 | 834	Point Blank	Spencer/Gleason	Nick Lowe	Nov. 2019
As Miguel searches for Peter, the Chameleon hires the Hitman to assassinate Doctor Doom.
34 | 835	Target: Doom	Spencer/Gleason	Nick Lowe	Nov. 2019
After the failed assassination attempt on Doom, Miguel O'Hara finds Spider-Man and warns him of what would happen in the future.
35 | 836	Doom's Day	Spencer/Oscar Bazaldua	Nick Lowe	Dec. 2019
Doom attacks all of New York with his Doombot army, searching for the assassin. Spider-Man uses a device that shows him possible future outcomes of the situation.
36 | 837	Time After Time	Spencer/Bazaldua	Nick Lowe	Dec. 2019
Spider-Man saves the future from being torn apart by war by making Doom believe he is being manipulated into creating a war.
37 | 838	Time, for a Change	Spencer/Ottley	Nick Lowe	Jan. 2020
Kindred begins putting his plan into motion by resurrecting the Sin-Eater.
38 | 839	Breaking News: Part One	Spencer/Coello	Nick Lowe	Jan. 2020
When trying to help clear Spider-Man's name of bank robbery, J. Jonah Jameson accidentally exposes a top secret mission.
39 | 840	Breaking News: Part Two	Spencer/Coello	Nick Lowe	Feb. 2020
After Spider-Man yells at Jameson for ruining the secret mission, he realizes Jameson is just trying to help and becomes a guest on his podcast.
40 | 841	Breaking News: Part Three	Spencer/Coello/Zé Carlós	Nick Lowe	Feb. 2020
Spider-Man battles Chance and the Jack O'Lanterns. Peter is offered a job by Norah Winters, who is really working with the Chameleon.
41 | 842	True Companions: Part One	Spencer/Ottley	Nick Lowe	March 2020
Boomerang reveals that the Kingpin is after him because he has the knowledge of where to find the Lifeline Tablet. He and Spider-Man work together to find the missing pieces before the Kingpin can, but are attacked by Vermin and Gog in the process.
42 | 843	True Companions: Part Two	Spencer/Ottley	Nick Lowe	March 2020
Gog's backstory and connection to the Lifeline Tablet are revealed.
43 | 844	True Companions: Part Three	Spencer/Ottley	Nick Lowe	May 2020
Spider-Man and Boomerang fight Gog. After they manage to bring Gog back down to small size, Gog becomes Peter's house pet.
44 | 845	Beware the Rising	Spencer/Kim Jacinto/Bruno Oliveira	Nick Lowe	July 2020
Peter has nightmares of Overdrive being chased for days by the Sin-Eater. In another nightmare, he talks about how he misses MJ, but is killed by Kindred.
N/A	Sins Rising: Prelude	Spencer/Guillermo Sanna	Nick Lowe	July 2020
Expands on the backstory of the Sin-Eater, told in Spectacular Spider-Man #107-110 and #134-136. Sin-Eater is given his calling by Kindred: to cleanse the world of sin.
45 | 846	Sins Rising: Part One	Spencer/Mark Bagley	Nick Lowe	July 2020
The Sin-Eater returns. Peter lives his dream of the Sin-Eater chasing Overdrive. The Sin-Eater shoots Overdrive while Spider-Man tries to defend him. Carlie Cooper investigates Overdrive's body, but he suddenly wakes up without any bullet wound.
46 | 847	Sins Rising: Part Two	Spencer/Marcelo Ferreira	Nick Lowe	Aug. 2020
The Sin-Eater "cleanses" the Lethal Legion, taking away their sins and their powers, turning them into normal, regretful people. The Sin-Eater is shown massive public support. Return of Norman Osborn.
47 | 848	Sins Rising: Part Three	Spencer/Ferreira	Nick Lowe	Aug. 2020
The Sin-Eater amasses a public following, with whom he shares his power with. Spider-Man talks to Carlie to find more information on what happened to Overdrive. Peter begins to question his morality. The Sin-Eater reveals that his next target given to him by Kindred to cleanse is Norman Osborn.
48 | 849	Sins Rising: Part Four	Spencer/Bagley	Nick Lowe	Sept. 2020
Spider-Man battles the Sin-Eater's mob, alongside Spider-Gwen and Miles Morales. Peter struggles with whether or not to save Norman Osborn from being cleansed, after all the times he has hurt him and all the people close to him have been killed by Norman. Miles tells him to let the Sin-Eater cleanse Norman and then stop him. Peter talks to Spider-Gwen about how he felt when Norman killed Gwen and what she would want him to do. In the end, Peter decides to save Norman.
N/A	The Sins of Norman Osborn	Spencer/Federico Vicentini	Nick Lowe	Sept. 2020
Spider-Man and Norman Osborn are trapped in the Ravencroft Institute by the Sin-Eater and his mob, who are trying to cleanse Osborn. The Sin-Eater cleanses Mister Negative's sins at Martin Li's request. Miles Morales, Spider-Gwen, Madame Web, Silk, Spider-Girl and Spider-Woman all have visions of Norman Osborn killing Spider-Man and form the Order of the Web to stop Spider-Man from saving Osborn. The Sin-Eater cleanses the Juggernaut, gaining his powers.
49 | 850	The Return of the Green Goblin	Spencer/Ottley/Ramos/Bagley	Nick Lowe	Oct. 2020
Norman Osborn becomes the Green Goblin again. Spider-Man and the Green Goblin are forced to team up to battle the Sin-Eater's mob. Spider-Man and the Green Goblin battle the now impenetrable Sin-Eater. Spider-Gwen convinces the Order of the Web that Peter knows what he is doing. Peter collapses the entire floor on the Sin-Eater, burying himself as well. Norman tells Peter he has always hated him since their identities were revealed to each other in The Amazing Spider-Man #40, because Peter not only defeated him, but saved him, and Norman had to forever live in that debt. Norman then lifts the rubble, freeing Peter, and declares the debt paid. Sin-Eater catches up to them and the fighting continues. Peter remembers that he defeated the Juggernaut in The Amazing Spider-Man #230, by burying him in liquid cement. Norman liquifies the ground beneath them, but Peter is forced to hold the Sin-Eater down so he does not escape, causing them both to sink. The Sin-Eater asks why he would give his own life for Norman. In Peter's mind, it is not for Norman, but for everyone else, and what is supposed to be right, as he thinks of Mary Jane. Peter is then betrayed by Norman, who drowns him in the cement, but is saved by the Order of the Web. As they try to leave, Norman reminds Peter that he will kill everyone he loves and they deserve it just by knowing him. Facing indecision, Spider-Man remembers that every time he saves Norman, someone always dies. First Gwen, then Harry, then Flash; Norman would never stop killing. After taunting Peter about Gwen's neck snapping, Peter has had enough and abandons Norman, leaving him to be cleansed by the Sin-Eater. Kindred is sympathetic, saying he understands Peter's actions, but just proved the failure in his principles.
50 | 851	Last Remains: Part One	Spencer/Gleason	Nick Lowe	Oct. 2020
The Sin-Eater cleanses Norman Osborn. Kindred abandons the Sin-Eater and uses all the sins he collected to possess the Order of the Web. Spider-Man goes to Doctor Strange for help after having barely escaped Kindred. Kindred gathers the skeletons of Peter's dead loved ones and seats them around a dinner table. A repentant Norman Osborn reveals that Kindred is Harry Osborn.
50.LR	Fallen Order	Spencer/Matthew Rosenburg/Vicentini	Nick Lowe	Oct. 2020
A Last Remains tie-in. Spider-Man battles the Order of the Web, who are possessed by Kindred. Norman Osborn, "cleansed" of his evil, talks to Ashley Kafka, horrified at all the terrible things he has done. Mary Jane returns.
51 | 852	Last Remains: Part Two	Spencer/Gleason	Nick Lowe	Oct. 2020
Kindred uses Silk to attack Spider-Man and Doctor Strange and tells Peter that he will have to find him to save his friends. Strange tries to use the Hand of Vishanti to help Peter, but runs into a complication. It is revealed that Spider-Man previously asked the Black Cat to steal the Hand in case Strange refused to help. Peter uses it to enter the Astral Plane and tracks down Kindred at the cemetery.
51.LR	Fallen Order: Part Two	Spencer/Rosenburg/Vicentini	Nick Lowe	Nov. 2020
A Last Remains tie-in. The possessed Order of the Web spread rampage across the city, causing massive damage. The Sin-Eater swears to cleanse the Spiders to prove himself to Kindred, and to do that, he must first cleanse Morlun. Norman Osborn rescues MJ from the wreckage. Dr. Strange confronts the Black Cat.
52 | 853	Last Remains: Part Three	Spencer/Gleason	Nick Lowe	Nov. 2020
Spider-Man finally comes face-to-face with Kindred and is enraged at seeing the dug-up skeletons of his loved ones. Spider-Man battles Kindred and is easily defeated. Kindred throws him into the city, where he sees the Order of the Web creating chaos, and tells Peter to look at what he has done to them. When Peter sees a possessed Spider-Gwen ready to throw Miles Morales off the Brooklyn Bridge, he makes a deal with Kindred, begging the demon to kill him and let his friends go. Kindred accepts and removes the sins from the Order of the Web. Peter is relieved to see them safe. Kindred proceeds to snap Spider-Man's neck, killing him.
52.LR	Fallen Order: Part Three	Spencer/Rosenburg/Vicentini	Nick Lowe	Nov. 2020
A Last Remains tie-in. Dr. Strange and the Order of the Web, now freed from Kindred's possession, use the Hand of Vishanti to enter the Astral Plane and find Spider-Man. The Black Cat guards the Hand. The Sin-Eater uses the Spider-Island virus to turn his followers into giant spiders as bait for Morlun. Norman attempts to convince MJ to help him get through to Harry.
53 | 854	Last Remains: Part Four	Spencer/Bagley	Nick Lowe	Nov. 2020
Spider-Man relives the fallout of One More Day and the beginning of Brand New Day. Kindred resurrects Spider-Man and reveals himself to Peter as Harry Osborn.
53.LR	Fallen Order: Part Four	Spencer/Rosenburg/Vicentini/Takeshi Miyazawa	Nick Lowe	Nov. 2020
A Last Remains tie-in. The Sin-Eater cleanses Morlun. Dr. Strange and the Order of the Web battle the demonic versions of Aunt May, the Kingpin and Jack Martino (the sniper who shot Aunt May in The Amazing Spider-Man #538) in the Astral Plane of Peter's dreams. The Order of the Web make it out of the Astral Plane and into Kindred's cemetery, where the Sin-Eater awaits. Dr. Strange stays behind to battle a demon in the form of Mary Jane.
54 | 855	Last Remains: Part Five	Spencer/Bagley	Nick Lowe	Dec. 2020
After failing to get through to Harry, Peter fights him, saying that they have had this fight before and he always wins. Harry defeats Peter, showing him that this was not another breakdown; he is a demon now. Kindred proceeds to kill and resurrect Spider-Man over and over again in different brutal ways, attempting to make him confess a sin he cannot remember. He then shows Peter that MJ and his friends have been led into a trap by the Morlunized Sin-Eater in their attempts to save him.
54.LR	Fallen Order: Part Five	Spencer/Rosenburg/Vicentini/Miyazawa	Nick Lowe	Dec. 2020
A Last Remains tie-in. Mary Jane flashes back to when Harry became the Green Goblin and promised he'd never hurt her. The Order of the Web battle the Morlunized Sin-Eater. Madame Web allows him to take her future-seeing powers. Sin-Eater is driven mad by what he sees and commits suicide. Kindred captures the Order of the Web. Norman Osborn is revealed to still be evil and is working with the Kingpin. Several pages from Spectacular Spider-Man #200 are reprinted.
55 | 856	Last Remains: Part Six	Spencer/Gleason	Nick Lowe	Dec. 2020
Kindred ties Peter and the Order of the Web to thrones made out of skeletons and berates Peter for putting them in danger by inspiring them to do what he does. MJ arrives to try and reason with Harry. The three of them have dinner and Harry reflects on key moments from their past and how Peter's decisions as Spider-Man destroyed all of their lives. Peter cannot figure out what Harry wants him to confess, which infuriates Kindred. MJ takes responsibility for Harry's fate and offers for him to kill her, but spare Peter and the others. However, the Green Goblin returns and throws a pumpkin bomb at MJ, seemingly killing her. Harry is enraged at his father and swears to kill him. The Kingpin traps Kindred in a prison of dark force.
56 | 857	Last Remains: Post-Mortem – Part 1	Spencer/Bagley	Nick Lowe	Jan. 2021
The Kingpin had used the Spot to recreate the Darkforce dome that trapped all of New York during Secret Empire to capture Kindred. Norman reveals that he actually was cleansed and that the bomb he threw at MJ was a flash grenade. He had interfered to stop Harry from killing anyone else.
57 | 858	Last Remains: Post-Mortem – Part 2	Spencer/Bagley	Nick Lowe	Jan. 2021
Peter confronts Norman, demanding answers, and warns him to stay out of his life. Watching this, Kindred comments that he is exactly where he wants to be. While analyzing the dug-up bodies, Carlie notices one extra body and leaves MJ a voicemail, but is stopped by centipedes before she can finish.
58 | 859	Negative Space: Part 1	Spencer/Ferreira	Nick Lowe	Jan. 2021
Mister Negative and the Inner Demons chase Martin Li to recombine with him after being separated by Sin-Eater. Li is taken in by Aunt May at the F.E.A.S.T. Center. Peter tells Liz Allan about Harry. Norman warns Peter of the attack on the F.E.A.S.T. center. Kingpin reveals that he first met Kindred in Paris during his exile.
59 | 860	Negative Space: Part 2	Spencer/Ferreira	Nick Lowe	Feb. 2021
Spider-Man battles the Inner Demons. Norman takes Liz and Normie to Ravencroft to see what Harry has become. Martin Li becomes Mister Negative again to save Aunt May. Mister Negative gives the Kingpin the Tablet of Death and Entropy, revealing that he needs both it and the Lifeline Tablet to perform a resurrection.
60 | 861	No Exit	Spencer/Bagley	Nick Lowe	Feb. 2021
MJ helps Peter get through his trauma and tries to get information about Kindred from Mysterio. Doctor Strange visits Mephisto and questions him about Peter's soul.
61 | 862	Let's Try Something New!	Spencer/Gleason	Nick Lowe	March 2021
Peter gets a new job at Threats & Menaces, and a new suit that records his outings. Bullseye is hired by Kingpin to kill Gog. First appearance of the Boomerang Revenge Squad (Hydro-Man, Shocker, and Speed Demon).
62 | 863	Wag the Gog	Spencer/Gleason	Nick Lowe	March 2021
Spider-Man and Boomerang fight to control a now giant sized Gog. Boomerang is enraged at the Kingpin for going after his pet. Robbie Robertson and Tombstone find out about their children's relationship.
63 | 864	King's Ransom: Part 1	Spencer/Vicentini	Nick Lowe	April 2021
The Kingpin works with Baron Mordo to investigate Kindred. Tombstone and Robbie confront their children. Spider-Man and Boomerang fight Hammerhead, Owl, and the rest of the mob bosses.
64 | 865	King's Ransom: Part 2	Spencer/Vicentini	Nick Lowe	April 2021
Baron Mordo's interrogation of Kindred continues. Tombstone and Robbie work together to find their kids, who have been kidnapped by Madame Masque and the Crime Master. Boomerang abandons Peter and searches for the tablet on his own. Otto Octavius returns, looking for his memories, and is confronted by Kindred.
65 | 866	King's Ransom: Part 3	Spencer/Vicentini/Federico Sabbatini	Nick Lowe	May 2021
The Kingpin gives Norman Osborn one more day to help Kindred. Spider-Man and the Sinister Syndicate save Randy and Janice from Madame Masque and the Crime-Master. Peter searches for Boomerang.
N/A	Giant Size Amazing Spider-Man: King's Ransom	Spencer/Rogê Antônio/Carlos Gómez/Carlós	Nick Lowe	May 2021
King's Ransom Conclusion. Boomerang betrays Spider-Man, and gives the tablet to the Kingpin, who uses it to resurrect his son, the Rose.
66 | 867	Tangled Web	Spencer/Bagley	Nick Lowe	May 2021
Norman uses the Spot to free Kindred from Baron Mordo's clutches. Peter is broken by Boomerang's betrayal. Robbie and Tombstone come to a truce. Overdrive contacts MJ about Carlie. Carlie wakes up in a prison cell with Harry Osborn.
67 | 868	Chameleon Conspiracy: Part 1	Spencer/Ferreira/Gomez	Nick Lowe	June 2021
Teresa interrogates the Chameleon to find out if she is an LMD, like her parents. Betty Brant is pregnant with the child of Ned Leeds's clone, who is still alive. Chance bargains with Jamie for the Clairvoyant device. Kindred captures Otto Octavius, offering him a deal to restore his memories.
68 | 869	Chameleon Conspiracy: Part 2	Spencer/Ed Brisson/Ferreira/Gomez/Carlos	Nick Lowe	June 2021
Ned Leeds reveals how he returned from the dead. The Foreigner, Chance, and Slyde use Jamie to steal the catalyst. Doctor Octopus recruits Sandman for the Sinister Six.
69 | 870	Chameleon Conspiracy: Part 3	Spencer/Brisson/Carlos/Gomez/Ferreira	Nick Lowe	June 2021
The Finisher reveals how he survived after The Amazing Spider-Man Annual #5. The Foreigner and Chance steal the Clairvoyant, but the Jack O'Lanterns who are working for the Finisher steal it. Spider-Man asks Ned Leeds for help. Doctor Octopus resurrects the original Electro.
N/A	Giant Size Amazing Spider-Man: Chameleon Conspiracy	Spencer/Brisson/Ferreira/Gomez/Carlós/Ig Guara	Nick Lowe	June 2021
Chameleon Conspiracy Conclusion. The Finisher and Chameleon send Teresa to get the Clairvoyant. Spider-Man and Ned Leeds defeat the Foreigner. The Jack O'Lanterns are revealed to be Chameleons. The Chameleon is visited by Kindred. Doctor Octopus recruits the Lizard and Kraven the Hunter.
70 | 871	Prelude to Sinister War	Spencer/Vicentini	Nick Lowe	July 2021
Doctor Octopus uses the isotope genome accelerator to split Curt Conners and the Lizard and recruits the latter. Harry Osborn reveals how he was put in the cell. Carlie reveals that the extra body she found among the ones Kindred exhumed was Harry Osborn. Kindred selects Mysterio as the final member of the Sinister Six.
1	Sinister War	Spencer/Bagley	Nick Lowe	July 2021
The Sinister War begins! Peter plans his proposal to MJ at her movie premiere, which is interrupted by an attack by the Savage Six (the Vulture, the Scorpion, Stegron, the Rhino, the Tarantula, and the King Cobra). Peter finds out Mysterio is the director of the movie when he is forced to reveal himself during the fight. Doctor Octopus and the Sinister Six arrive to battle the Savage Six and recruit Mysterio, who sees Kindred's hand behind this, and whisks MJ away. Spider-Man is captured by the Sinister Six and delivered to Kindred, wherein he comes face to face with the Sinister Syndicate, Boomerang's Superior Foes, and the Foreigner's Revenge Squad. Mephisto tells Dr. Strange, to his disbelief, that the damage to Peter's soul came from a deal Peter made with him of his own will.
71 | 872	Sinister War: Part 1	Spencer/Vicentini/Sabbatini	Nick Lowe	July 2021
Mysterio explains how Kindred freed him from Hell and brought him under his will. Mendel Stromm leaves Norman a key to an estate in his will. Kindred reflects on his original death in Spectacular Spider-Man #200. Harry and Carlie are freed from the cell.
2	Sinister War	Spencer/Brisson/Bagley/Dioegenes Neves/Gómez/Carlos	Nick Lowe	Aug. 2021
Ana Kravinoff joins the Sinister Syndicate. Kindred puts centipedes in the heads of the Sinister Syndicate, Superior Foes, and Wild Pack. He sends them to kill Spider-Man, with the threat of eternal Hell for all but the one who brings him.
3	Sinister War	Spencer/Brisson/Bagley/Gómez/Carlos	Nick Lowe	Aug. 2021
Spider-Man is defeated by Doctor Octopus and the Sinister Six before being snatched by the Savage Six. While fighting the Savage Six, Boomerang and the Superior Foes take Spider-Man. However, Boomerang creates a distraction and helps Spider-Man escape. As Peter runs, broken, to the dumpster next to the Ravencroft Institute, Kindred revives the Sin-Eater again, releasing all the captured sins to the Ravencroft inmates. A beaten-up and brutalized Spider-Man stands against the Sin Eater, Morlun, the Juggernaut, and the Lethal Legion.
72 | 873	Sinister War: Part 2	Spencer/Sabbatini/Carlos/Ferreira/Gómez	Nick Lowe	Aug. 2021
Norman Osborn visits the estate left to him by Stromm and faces recordings of his former self and son. AI Harry reveals that Norman made a deal with Mephisto when his life was failing. Mephisto gave Norman a new life as the Goblin, but at the cost that Harry Osborn would die. Carlie and Harry escape from the catacombs into the morgue where all but one of the bodies are missing. Kindred tells MJ that he is not entirely who she thinks he is, but the time has come to reveal the truth - no matter the cost.
4	Sinister War	Brisson/Spencer/Bagley/Neves/Ferreira	Nick Lowe	Sept. 2021
With the help of Morlun's tracking abilities, the Six Sinister Sixes converge on Spider-Man. All the villains battle to capture Spider-Man as Kindred speaks menacingly from a distance. After fighting his way through, Spider-Man is met by Morlun, who attempts to drain his life, but Boomerang tackles Morlun, freeing Spider-Man from his grip. Enraged, Morlun kills Boomerang. Seeing the sacrifice of their old friend, the Beetle and the Superior Foes turn on the rest of the villains. Doctor Octopus, enraged that he has not received the answers he seeks, betrays Kindred and knocks out all the villains through the centipedes Kindred put in their brains. As Spider-Man rushes to confront Kindred, Dr. Strange and Mephisto continue their gamble.
73 | 874	Sins of Our Fathers	Spencer/Carlos/Gómez/Ferreira	Nick Lowe	Sept. 2021
After being beaten up by the Sinister Sixes, Spider-Man enters Kindred's mausoleum, where he is transported through a door to Paris. Kindred reveals Sarah Stacy's face below the mask to MJ. AI Harry reveals to Norman that his affair with Gwen never happened, and that he used Mysterio to manipulate Norman and MJ's memories. Sarah and Gabriel were experiments created by the Chameleon under AI Harry's orders, to be the vessel for Harry's demonic soul. Sarah and Gabriel died repeatedly, as the experiment was a failure, until Peter transferred his blood to save Sarah, stabilizing the side effects of the Goblin Serum. In the morgue, Harry uncovers his own dead body, and reveals to Carlie that his death was real. AI Harry used Mysterio to trick Norman into believing his son was alive. Kindred declares that MJ must pay for her sins. Mephisto offers his final wager: the virtue of a hero for the corruption of a soul.
74 | 875	What Cost, Victory?	Spencer/Christos Gage/Ferreira/Bagley/Carlos/Neves/Gómez/Ivan Fiorelli/Ramos	Nick Lowe	Sept. 2021
Mephisto speaks to Harry Osborn in Hell, telling him he is "the soul that hangs in the balance." Peter, MJ, and Norman are all transported to the two Kindreds, revealed to be Sarah and Gabriel Stacy. Meanwhile, at Hotel Inferno, Mephisto offers to free Harry Osborn's soul if Strange wins, but if he loses, Mephisto gets his soul. Norman confesses about his deal with Mephisto and apologizes to Harry; Spider-Man and Harry's Clone reluctantly rescue him and battle the Kindreds. After a failed escape, the Kindreds prepare to kill Norman. However, Harry, jumps in the way, and sacrifices his life to save his father, with his last words, mourning his old friend. Mephisto tells Strange how he created Sarah and Gabriel, and make Peter burn in Hell place of them. Peter is frozen with guilt seeing Harry's body, and collapsing the entire mausoleum onto him. Mephisto narrates the true battle for Peter's soul to Strange, as Peter remembers his failures and darkest moments, lacking any hope. However, Strange reveals to Mephisto that they each had two champions in the bet, and that MJ, not Harry was his second champion. MJ rescues Peter, giving him hope once again, winning the bet for Strange. Mephisto's demonic enhancements break and the twins rapid-aging disease causes them to slowly dissolve. Peter comforts the twins, reminding them that Gwen would have loved them all the same. Mephisto explains his obsession with Peter: he sees his own dominion and reign over the world in the future, and it is ended by Peter & MJ's child, who was erased from existence by Peter's original deal with Mephisto.

=== The Amazing Spider-Man (vol. 5) #75–93 (October 2021 – March 2022) — Spider-Man: Beyond ===
Note: See Free Comic Book Day (2021): Spider-Man/Venom.

Issue #	Title	Author / Illustrator	Editor	Release date
75 | 876	Beyond: Chapter One	Zeb Wells/Patrick Gleason	Nick Lowe	Oct. 2021
Struggling to come to terms with Harry's death, Peter swings to an abandoned building where he is confronted by another Spider-Man. Ben Reilly then reveals himself as the new Spider-Man, employed by the Beyond Corporation, who were building pieces of other corporations over the last couple years, and bought the trademark to the Spider-Man brand, which Otto had trademarked when he created Parker Industries. While battling the U-Foes with Ben, Peter is severely injured by a radioactive explosion.
76 | 877	Beyond: Chapter Two	Wells/Gleason	Nick Lowe	Oct. 2021
After being hospitalized, Peter struggles to recover from the radioactive explosion and is visited by Aunt May and MJ. A crestfallen Ben asks Peter for his blessing to be Spider-Man. Peter obliges and then slips into a coma.
77 | 878	Beyond: Chapter Three	Kelly Thompson/Sara Pichelli	Nick Lowe	Oct. 2021
After training with Misty Knight and Colleen Wing, Ben goes through therapy with Ashley Kafka to talk about his problems since his time as the Jackal. Spider-Man is bitten by Morbius while battling him.
78 | 879	Beyond: Chapter Four	Thompson/Pichelli/Jim Towe	Nick Lowe	Nov. 2021
Morbius is taken out by the Beyond security systems. Ben slowly recovers from the vampire's bite. Kraven the Hunter returns. Peter begins to wake up when he is visited by Black Cat.
78.BEY	Title Unknown	Jed MacKay/Eleonora Carlini	Nick Lowe	Nov. 2021
Ben Reilly is trained by the Daughters of the Dragon. Debut of Obsidian Star.
79 | 880	Beyond: Chapter Five	Cody Ziglar/Michael Dowling	Nick Lowe	Nov. 2021
Ben begins to suspect the ulterior motives of Beyond hiring him as Spider-Man. Kraven shoots Spider-Man with a hallucinogenic dart.
80 | 881	Beyond: Chapter Six	Ziglar/Dowling	Nick Lowe	Dec. 2021
Ben deals with battling Kraven's drug induced visions and defeats Kraven with the help of his prisoners. Marcus Momplaisir deals with Janine's rage at not knowing Ben's whereabouts.
80.BEY	Title Unknown	Ziglar/Ivan Fiorelli	Nick Lowe	Dec. 2021
At the request of Aunt May, Doctor Octopus finds and sends research to the doctors that help them cure Peter, but discovers what the Beyond Corporation took from Parker Industries, his former company.
81 | 882	Beyond: Chapter Seven	Saladin Ahmed/Carlos Gómez	Nick Lowe	Dec. 2021
The Beyond Corporation sends Ben Reilly to take down Miles Morales, however they team up to fight the Rhizome monster. Upon not fulfilling Beyond's order, Maxine Danger threats disciplinary action.
82 | 883	Beyond: Chapter Eight	Ahmed/Jorge Fornéz	Nick Lowe	Dec. 2021
A barely conscious Peter is put in a hospital run by a carnivorous monster who eats his patients. As MJ rescues him and stuns the monster, Colleen Wing and Misty Knight capture the Lizard.
83 | 884	Beyond: Chapter Nine	Patrick Gleason	Nick Lowe	Dec. 2021
Peter works through physical therapy, attempting to recover from nearly dying.
84 | 885	Beyond: Chapter Ten	Ziglar/Paco Medina	Nick Lowe	Jan. 2022
Ben makes a breakthrough in his therapy sessions with Dr. Kafka. Doc Ock attacks a Beyond office and steals a drive containing all their secrets. Spider-Man is sent to stop him but is knocked out by Beyond's security measures.
85 | 886	Beyond: Chapter Eleven	Ziglar/Medina	Nick Lowe	Jan. 2022
Otto launches a surprise attack on Maxine's office at Beyond. Spider-Man battles Dok Ock, who then shows him what was on the drive and why Beyond really chose Ben. Ben hides the drive and tells Maxine it was destroyed.
86 | 887	Beyond: Chapter Twelve	Wells/Dowling	Nick Lowe	Jan. 2022
Ben opens up and tells Dr. Kafka about what happened with Doc Ock and Beyond. Kafka reveals that Beyond erased some of his memories including those of the Jackal resurrecting him, unaware that Beyond is watching them both, as Maxine knocks them unconscious. Janine takes Marcus hostage. Beyond tries to erase Ben's recent memories, unintentionally collapsing his mind.
87 | 888	Beyond: Chapter Thirteen	MacKay/Gómez	Nick Lowe	Jan. 2022
Captain America and Black Cat try to train a struggling Spider-Man back into form. Ben recovers from his memory readjustment but has forgotten the "Great Responsibility" quote. Maxine threatens Dr. Kafka with a mysterious substance. Janine confronts MJ about the drive.
1	Mary Jane & Black Cat: Beyond	MacKay/C.F. Villa	Nick Lowe	Jan. 2022
MJ and Felicia search for the demonic Hood of Parker Robbins, who will kill an unconscious Peter otherwise.
88 | 889	Beyond: Chapter Fourteen	Wells/Dowling	Nick Lowe	Feb. 2022
After interrogating Marcus, Maxine deduces that Janine and MJ have taken the drive to the Daily Bugle. Beyond integrates the Sins of Norman Osborn into Dr. Kafka, turning her into the Queen Goblin, a villain they control. Spider-Man fights the Queen Goblin at the Daily Bugle, and the drive is destroyed in the mix. Ben unexpectedly takes off with Janine.
88.BEY	Title Unknown	Geoffery Thorne/Jan Bazaldua/Towe	Nick Lowe	Feb. 2022
A doctor working for Beyond offers The Slingers a job.
89 | 890	Beyond: Chapter Fifteen	Gleason/Mark Bagley	Nick Lowe	Feb. 2022
Felicia traps Peter is his webs to prevent him from harming himself facing the Queen Goblin, but he is freed by Janine, who needs himself. Peter rescues Black Cat from the Queen Goblin's rampage, and returns as Spider-Man.
90 | 891	Beyond: Chapter Sixteen	Gleason	Nick Lowe	Feb. 2022
The gaps in Ben's memories have changed him, as he heads to Beyond's Staten Island facility. After battling the Queen Goblin for an hour, Peter hears that Maxine has activated the Backdraft Protocol, and goes to Staten Island to help Ben.
91 | 892	Beyond: Chapter Seventeen	Thompson/Pichelli	Nick Lowe	Mar. 2022
Peter and Ben fight off the creatures unleashed by Maxine in the facility, joined by the Daughters of the Dragon. A mentally degrading Ben opens Door-Z, and leaves Peter with Colleen and Misty Knight to fight the monster, as he goes after Maxine.
92 | 893	Beyond: Chapter Eighteen	MacKay/Pichelli	Nick Lowe	Mar. 2022
Peter and the Daughters of the Dragon battle Creature Z, revealed to be the Lizard infused with Morbius's powers. Maxine activates all the procedures to destroy incriminating evidence as Ben tears through the Beyond Tower, in search of his memories, and Janine looks for Marcus.
92.BEY	Title Unknown	Wells/Bagley	Nick Lowe	Mar. 2022
Spectrum joins the Daughters of the Dragon and defeat Creature Z by tricking him into biting a cured Morbius. Maxine send the Slingers to attack them, but are confronted by Spider-Man before they can do anything. Free from Beyond, the Queen Goblin vows to reunite Norman Osborn with his sins.
93 | 894	Beyond: Chapter Nineteen	Wells/Gleason	Nick Lowe	Mar. 2022
A mentally wrecked Ben finds only a hologram of Maxine, who tells him the only copy of his lost memories are in Peter, who arrives at the destroyed Beyond tower to confront him. Janine rescues Marcus, as Maxine unleashes a radioactive liquid to destroy all evidence. A reluctant Peter is forced to fight Ben, who blames Peter for everything he's gone through. Ben traps Peter in a spinneret device and forces a helmet on him to transfer his memories, however Peter breaks free and destroys the helmet. Accepting death and refusing Peter's help, Ben lets go and falls into the radioactive liquid. Marcus rescues Peter, and Janine rescues a damaged but still alive Ben. After Peter reunites with MJ in the hospital, they are both approached by a blinding figure. Months later, Ben has a mental breakdown and takes the identity of Chasm.

== The Amazing Spider-Man #895–964 (April 2022 – March 2025) ==
=== The Amazing Spider-Man (vol. 6) #1-60 (April 2022 – October 2024) ===
Issue #	Title	Author / Illustrator	Editor	Release date
1 | 895	What Did Spider-Man Do?!	Zeb Wells/John Romita, Jr.	Nick Lowe	April 2022
After 6 months, everything in Peter's life has changed because of something he did. After returning to New York, Spider-Man stops a sale from Tombstone's gang to the Rose, and barely survives a revived Digger. First appearance of Paul Rabin, MJ's new "husband," and their "children." Doctor Octopus is captured by a mysterious figure.
2 | 896		Wells/Romita, Jr.	Nick Lowe	May 2022
After babysitting for Norman and Liz, Spider-Man intercepts White Rabbit in Tombstone's service and is then led into a trap to be captured by the crime lord.
3 | 897		Wells/Romita, Jr.	Nick Lowe	June 2022
Spider-Man is captured by Tombstone and trapped to a chair. Tombstone reveals his backstory and prepares for his henchmen to kill Harlemites in a massacre while he kidnaps Robbie Robertson.
4 | 898		Wells/Romita, Jr.	Nick Lowe	June 2022
Kareem, a former Tombstone henchman, frees Spider-Man, who defeats several Tombstone henchman to prevent the massacre, but unknowingly ends the crime war between Tombstone and the Rose.
5 | 899		Wells/Romita, Jr.	Nick Lowe	July 2022
After recovering, Spider-Man leads Digger to find Tombstone's secret cache of goods.
6 | 900	Main Story	Wells/Ed McGuinness	Nick Lowe	July 2022
On his birthday, Peter faces the Living Brain, who has captured the original Sinister Six to create the Sinister Super-Adaptoid in order to know "who is Spider-Man?" Spider-Man teams up with the Sinister Six, defeats the Sinister Super-Adaptoid, and unplugs the Brain.
	Better Late Than Never	Daniel Kibblesmith/David Lopez		
Peter visits the New York Library.
	Third Story	Jeff Loveness/Todd Nauck		
Spider-Man battles Mysterio, who has become a music artist, releasing a revenge album on the former. Spider-Man guest stars on The Tonight Show with Jimmy Kimmel.
	Save the Date	Dan Slott/Marcos Martin		
Peter fails to get Betty Brant as his spring fling.
7 | 901		Wells/Romita, Jr.	Nick Lowe	Aug. 2022
After losing his granddaughter's respect, the Vulture intends to kill Spider-Man once and for all. Meanwhile, Peter Parker learns of Norman Osborn's revamp of Oscorp.
8 | 902		Wells/Romita, Jr.	Nick Lowe	Aug. 2022
Spider-Man defeats the Vulture using the gear Norman created for him. Peter Parker joins Oscorp.
9 | 903		Wells/Patrick Gleason	Nick Lowe	Sept. 2022
Hellfire Gala tie-in. Spider-Man and Wolverine rescue Mary Jane from Moira MacTaggert.
10 | 904		Wells/Nick Dragotta	Nick Lowe	Sept. 2022
A.X.E.: Judgment Day tie-in. The Progenitor, a Celestial woken up by the Avengers, has declared judgement of every human. Spider-Man is judged by an apparition of Gwen Stacy.
11 | 905		Wells/Romita, Jr.	Nick Lowe	Oct. 2022
Ned Leeds asks Peter for help covering a meeting between Norman and Roderick Kingsley involving Kingsley's former empire. Hobgoblin returns and attacks the scene. Ned and Betty's son, Winston is born.
12 | 906		Wells/Romita, Jr.	Nick Lowe	Oct. 2022
Betty tells Peter that Ned has been using the Hobgoblin costume again. Spider-Man encounters the Hobgoblin but is cornered by a second Hobgoblin, realizing that Kingsley has used the Winkler Device on Ned again.
13 | 907		Wells/Romita, Jr.	Nick Lowe	Nov. 2022
The two Hobgoblins defeat Spider-Man and Norman is forced to gear up to save Peter, reigniting his old brutality. Kingsley escapes, it is revealed that the Queen Goblin used the Winkler device on both Hobgoblins to turn Norman back into his true self.
14 | 908		Wells/Michael Dowling	Nick Lowe	Nov. 2022
Chasm and Janine are drawn to Limbo, where they meet Madelyne Pryor. Understanding the pain that drew them there, Madelyne is willing to house them, and bonds with Ben over being unwanted clones. She gives Chasm control of her army of demons to invade New York, and help her get what she wants from the X-Men. Madelyne gives Janine a demonic mask, transforming her into Hallows' Eve.
1	Dark Web	Wells/Adam Kubert	Nick Lowe	Dec. 2022
Peter, MJ, and Harry's old friends gather to commemorate his death. Chasm and Madelyne Pryor invade New York with an army of demons from Limbo. Norman dons the Gold Goblin gear to help Peter.
15 | 909		Wells/McGuinness	Nick Lowe	Dec. 2022
In the midst of Chasm's invasion, Spider-Man is diverted by a battle with a one-dimensional Venom, as Ben corners him, ready to resume their fight.
16 | 910	Spider-Man vs. Chasm	Wells/McGuinness	Nick Lowe	Dec. 2022
Spider-Man battles Chasm, who has a different recollection of their last interaction, blaming Peter for everything. Ben shows Peter an image of Jonah and Robbie suffering in Limbo, tricking him into asking to be taken there, to where a demon instantly transports him to.
17 | 911		Wells/McGuinness	Nick Lowe	Jan. 2023
Madelyne creates the Insidious Six, a demonic version of the Sinister Six. Jameson tricks the rest of the demons into leaving them, allowing him, Peter, and Robbie to escape, but they are ambushed by the Insidious Six, and saved by Rek-Rap, a demonic symbiote replica of Spider-Man.
18 | 912		Wells/McGuinness	Nick Lowe	Jan. 2023
After being shown unexpected kindness by Jean Grey, Madelyne seeks a truce with the X-Men, agreeing to stop the invasion of New York. As Spider-Man and Rek-Rap battle the Insidious Six, Hallows' Eve steals the scythe controlling the demons from Madelyne, giving it Ben, who turns into the demonic entity King Chasm, leading the demons to invade the real world. Spider-Man forms an alliance with Madelyne and the X-Men to stop Chasm.
1	Dark Web: Finale	Wells/Kubert/Francesco Mortarino	Nick Lowe	Feb. 2023
Spider-Man, the X-Men, Rek-Rap, and Madelyne battle King Chasm. Madelyne reasserts herself as the Goblin Queen, regaining control of Limbo's demons, and takes back the scythe, regains her powers as Ben reverts back into Chasm. Ben is held in a paradise cell in Limbo, where Peter is yet unable to get through to him.
19 | 913		Joe Kelly/Terry Dodson	Nick Lowe	Feb. 2023
Peter and Felicia awkwardly run into MJ and Paul at a sauna. Spider-Man and Black Cat infiltrate an arms dealing operation run by criminals disguised as supervillains.
20 | 914		Kelly/Dodson	Nick Lowe	Feb. 2023
Spider-Man and Black Cat's infiltration concludes. Peter tells Felicia that he will always love MJ, but like a sister or a best friend.
21 | 915		Wells/Romita, Jr.	Nick Lowe	March 2023
Benjamin Rabin is revealed to be the blinding figure that approached Peter and MJ a year ago, attempting to become the Emissary of Wayep, the Mayan God of Mischief. As Spider-Man battles Rabin, he marks Peter for vengeance and MJ as a sacrifice. They are both transported to an apocalyptic world where a monster awaits them.
22 | 916		Wells/Romita, Jr.	Nick Lowe	March 2023
Paul is revealed to be one of Rabin's former acolytes that was trapped on the apocalyptic world of Wayep. Peter finds and fixes a broken multiversal travel device. Wayep attacks Spider-Man, MJ uses the travel device to cut Wayep in half, sending Peter back, and leaving her and Paul on the apocalyptic world.
23 | 917		Wells/Romita, Jr.	Nick Lowe	April 2023
After landing with an explosion in Pennsylvania, Peter realizes that time works differently in the apocalyptic world, and asks the Fantastic Four for help rescuing MJ. However, they do not trust him and want him detained for the authorities investigating the explosion. Spider-Man, escaping the Baxter Building is confronted by Captain America. A hasty Peter fights him off and asks Norman Osborn to help him save MJ from the apocalyptic world.
24 | 918		Wells/Romita, Jr.	Nick Lowe	April 2023
Spider-Man steals a fusion reactor from the Fantastic Four. Observed from afar by Ms. Marvel, Norman creates a machine with the travel device and stolen materials that sends Peter back to the apocalyptic world where MJ and Paul are being attacked by Rabin. However, more time has passed in this world, and Peter discovers MJ's new family.
25 | 919		Wells/Kaare Andrews/Romita, Jr.	Nick Lowe	May 2023
While Peter had only been gone for one month, 4 years had passed, where MJ and Paul were being hunted by Rabin. After finding 2 abandoned kids and taking them in, Paul creates a slot device to help battle Rabin. Once Peter returns, Rabin allows Paul to kill him, realizing that he must die to commence the ceremony. After they exchange their stories, MJ tells Peter that she won't leave Paul. Captain America, after asking MJ what happened, tells the Fantastic Four to leave a downtrodden Peter alone to sort things out. In his anger, Peter punches Paul. Rabin, now returned from his punishment, plans to finish the ceremony.
26 | 920		Wells/Romita, Jr.	Nick Lowe	May 2023
Rabin, the Emissary sets out to kill MJ in the present to finish the ceremony and become Wayep. The Gold Goblin and Ms. Marvel help Spider-Man battle Rabin's forces. Paul is revealed to be Rabin's son from the apocalyptic world. No longer needing them, Rabin dissolves the kids into nothingness. As MJ goes into a rage, the Fantastic Four arrive to neutralize the dragon. Rabin finds MJ and kills her, completing the ceremony. However, it is revealed to be Ms. Marvel shapeshifting as MJ and the ceremony does not work, destroying Rabin. The heroes stop to commemorate Ms. Marvel's sacrifice.
27 | 921		Wells/McGuinness	Nick Lowe	June 2023
Spider-Man and Black Cat battle the Shocker as Peter mourns Ms. Marvel's death, shadowed by Doc Ock's old arms. Doctor Octopus returns to destroy his former arms with his Ocktoids. The Queen Goblin comes back to life. Otto's broken arms find J. Jonah Jameson.
28 | 922		Wells/McGuinness	Nick Lowe	June 2023
Jameson brings Doc Ock's broken arms to Norman Osborn to fix. However, the arms were simply a trojan horse which gives Otto access to Oscorp's systems. Doctor Octopus abandons Kraven the Hunter, defeating Spider-Man and the Gold Goblin, and compromises Norman's suit. Otto reveals that he remembers what Norman took from him as the Goblin King.
29 | 923		Wells/McGuinness	Nick Lowe	July 2023
Doc Ock's arms rescue Spider-Man and Jameson, and directly merge with Peter's spinal cord. Otto uses the Beyond Corporation's memory helmet to show Norman records of him ending Octavius's time as the Superior Spider-Man. Unable to recover his memories, Doc Ock seeks revenge on Norman, and injects him with the Goblin Formula.
30 | 924		Wells/McGuinness	Nick Lowe	July 2023
The Goblin Formula has no effect on Norman, given how much he has already absorbed. With the help of Otto's old arms, Peter finds Octavius's lab. Spider-Man and Norman defeat Doc Ock, but his Ocktoids carry him away to safety. Norman looks back on his journey to redemption.
31 | 925	Chapter 1: The Last Night	Wells/Romita, Jr./Emilio Laiso/Zé Carlos	Nick Lowe	Aug. 2023
Randy and Janice spend the night at their respective bachelor and bachelorette parties. Felicia breaks up with Peter. Tombstone, suspicious of his fellow mob bosses, invites them to the wedding. Shotgun arrives at the wedding to assassinate Tombstone, and briefly fights Spider-Man before getting away. Hammerhead kills Madame Masque. Spider-Man fills in a revived Ms. Marvel and reveals his identity to her out of gratitude. Doc Ock visits The Bar With No Name and realizes he must become the Superior Spider-Man again to regain his memory. MJ and Paul visit a therapist to deal with the disappearance of their children. After some encouragement from Felicia, MJ embraces the identity of Jackpot. Spider-Woman receives information about Hydra agents from Taskmaster and questions them about her lost baby. Kraven the Hunter captures the Queen Goblin. Wilson Fisk plans his return.
32 | 926		Wells/Gleason	Nick Lowe	Aug. 2023
Peter meets with Tombstone's lawyer, Michele, to exchange notes on the botched wedding. Kraven imbues Norman's sins from the Queen Goblin into his spear, and vows to return them to Norman. Oscorp falls under attack to Kraven. Norman understands why Kraven is there, and traps himself inside, however Spider-Man breaks in and is stabbed by Kraven's spear while saving Norman, imbuing the Goblin's sins onto himself.
33 | 927		Wells/Gleason	Nick Lowe	Sep. 2023
Infected by Norman's sins, Spider-Man dons the black suit again and hunts Kraven, seeking revenge for being buried alive. He traps Kraven in a cage, where he is attacked by Vermin. Once subdued, Spider-Man places Kraven in a coffin with his rifle, and buries him alive.
34 | 928		Wells/Gleason	Nick Lowe	Sep. 2023
Spider-Man goes on a rampage to punish his former enemies. Norman warns Paul and MJ about the danger they are in, while Peter disconnects Tombstone's life ventilator. After beating up Norman, Spider-Man goes after MJ and Paul, where he is confronted by the Queen Goblin. Kraven struggles to dig his way out of the grave, when he is rescued by Norman.
35 | 929		Wells/Gleason	Nick Lowe	Oct. 2023
Norman and Kraven reengineer the spear to reclaim the Norman's sins. After dealing with the Queen Goblin, Spider-Man attacks MJ and Paul. Kraven arrives and fights Spider-Man, distracting him long enough for Norman to stab Peter with the spear, removing Norman's sins from him. Kraven intends to bury the spear and Osborn's sins, however, upon seeing the Queen Goblin's smile, Norman knows he is not truly free.
36 | 930		Wells/McGuinness	Nick Lowe	Oct. 2023
The Goblin Queen sends out an agent to round up the lost limbo demons from Chasm's attack. Rek-Rap investigates a lead. Spider-Man rescues Rek-Rap from the agent, who knows Peter's identity.
37 | 931		Wells/McGuinness/Laiso	Nick Lowe	Nov. 2023
Madelyne's agent, Re-Po, kidnaps Randy as collateral to draw Peter in. Rek-Rap shares his findings about Re-Po. Re-Po sends Rek-Rap back to Limbo. Silvermane, Count Nefaria, and Hammerhead plot the Maggia's return. Peter confronts Re-Po, who believes Spider-Man owes him a debt.
38 | 932		Wells/McGuinness	Nick Lowe	Nov. 2023
Re-Po is revealed to be the debt collector. Rek-Rap and Spider-Man escape from Limbo and defeat Re-Po. Hammerhead attacks Lady Yulan's territory and frames Mr. Negative. Janice visits her father in the hospital. Silvermane's armor is hacked, choking out Count Nefaria and himself.
1	Amazing Spider-Man Gang War: First Strike	Wells/Cody Ziglar/Joey Vasquez/Julian Shaw	Nick Lowe	Nov. 2023
The gang leaders meet to discuss the recent events, led by Hammerhead. Miles confronts Peter about the 6 months he was missing for. Randy lobbies for the repealing of the law against superheroes passed by Fisk. Randy is shot by Hammerhead's goons. Madame Masque is revealed to be alive and attacks Hammerhead. The Gang War begins.
39 | 933		Wells/Romita, Jr.	Nick Lowe	Dec. 2023
The Gang War turns the entire city into a war zone. Spider-Man gathers Miles, Daredevil, Spider-Woman, and She-Hulk to help combat the crime lords. Tombstone wakes up from the hospital. Janice intends to strike against the other bosses, against her father's wishes, prompting him to tell White Rabbit to take care of her. Tombstone agrees to help Spider-Man battle the crime lords.
40 | 934		Wells/Romita, Jr.	Nick Lowe	Dec. 2023
Tombstone, Spider-Man, and She-Hulk continue to battle the crime lords. Madame Masque gains control of the Maggia. The Beetle invades Diamondback's territory, encountering Digger and Rose in the process. The Kingpin and Typhoid Mary return.
41 | 935		Wells/Romita, Jr.	Nick Lowe	Jan. 2024
Spider-Man, She-Hulk, and Tombstone battle Kingpin, Typhoid Mary, and their subordinates. The Beetle squares off against the Rose and Digger, until the Kingpin's forces intervene. Madame Masque plans the Maggia's next move.
42 | 936		Wells/Romita, Jr.	Nick Lowe	Jan. 2024
The Kingpin reveals he wants no stake in the war, and his forces apprehend the Rose. Fisk tells Tombstone that Madame Masque has control of the Maggia. Digger joins the Beetle's forces. Madame Masque and the Beetle prepare for a final showdown in Central Park.
43 | 937		Wells/Romita, Jr.	Nick Lowe	Feb. 2024
Spider-Man visits Randy in the hospital. The heroes strike at Madame Masque's forces in Central Park. The Beetle calls her forces back, as Madame Masque orders everyone to engage Spider-Man. Tombstone frees Shotgun of Madame Masque's magic and sabotages Janice, preparing to claim all territory himself.
44 | 938		Wells/Romita, Jr.	Nick Lowe	Feb. 2024
Tombstone double-crosses Spider-Man, pulling his forces back, leaving the heroes at the mercy of Madame Masque's army. Shotgun frees Silvermane and Count Nefaria of Masque's magic. Luke Cage, Spider-Boy, Jackpot, Iron Fist, and Shang-Chi arrive to reinforce the heroes, Spider-Man defeats Madame Masque. Fisk's law is repealed. Randy wakes up in the hospital. Tombstone seizes control over the entire territory.
45 | 939		Wells/Carmen Carnero	Nick Lowe	March 2024
Spider-Man breaks into Ravencroft to give Anna Watson a cure for the infected Krakoan medicine. Peter and MJ visit her the next day, where Peter encounters Sandman who warns him about the Sinister Six wanting him out of Ravencroft.
46 | 940		Wells/Carnero	Nick Lowe	March 2024
Doc Ock and the Sinister Six send Electro to break Sandman out of Ravencroft. Spider-Man and Jackpot battle Electro. Anna is released from Ravencroft. However, Sandman escapes anyway, returning the Sinister Six with Electro.
47 | 941		Wells/Nauck	Nick Lowe	April 2024
Aunt Anna sets Peter up on a date. Spider-Man fights Kingsley's goons, and Betty locates the Winkler Device, attempting to clear Ned. Chasm and Hallows' Eve reunite and confront Spider-Man and Betty along with the Queen Goblin.
48 | 942		Wells/Nauck	Nick Lowe	April 2024
The Queen Goblin attempts to use the Winkler Device to turn Ben into a goblin. Betty convinces Janine to see Kafka's real intention, as Spider-Man frees Ben and takes out the Queen Goblin. Ben and Janine escape, while Kafka hints that the device had been used on Spider-Man. The Sinister Six intend to take down the Living Brain, who is being protected by Oscorp.
49 | 943		Wells/Romita, Jr.	Nick Lowe	May 2024
Blood Hunt tie-in.
50 | 944		Wells/McGuinness	Nick Lowe	May 2024
51 | 945		Wells/McGuinness/Nauck	Nick Lowe	June 2024
52 | 946		Wells/McGuinness/Nauck	Nick Lowe	June 2024
53 | 947		Wells/Nauck/McGuinness	Nick Lowe	July 2024
54 | 948		Wells/McGuinness	Nick Lowe	July 2024
55 | 949		Wells/Laiso	Nick Lowe	Aug. 2024
56 | 950		Wells/Romita, Jr.	Nick Lowe	Aug. 2024
57 | 951		Wells/Romita, Jr.	Nick Lowe	Sep. 2024
58 | 952		Wells/Romita, Jr.	Nick Lowe	Sep. 2024
59 | 953		Wells/Romita, Jr.	Nick Lowe	Oct. 2024
60 | 954		Wells/Romita, Jr.	Nick Lowe	Oct. 2024

=== The Amazing Spider-Man (vol. 6) #61–70 (November 2024 – March 2025) — The Eight Deaths of Spider-Man ===
Issue #	Title	Author / Illustrator	Editor	Release date
61 | 955	The 8 Deaths of Spider-Man - Part 1: Inevitable Attraction	Joe Kelly/Ed McGuinness/Niko Henrichon	Nick Lowe	Nov. 2024
62 | 956	The 8 Deaths of Spider-Man - Part 2: Out of Space	Kelly/McGuinness	Nick Lowe	Nov. 2024
63 | 957	The 8 Deaths of Spider-Man - Part 3: Tick Tick Tick	Justina Ireland/Gleb Melnikov	Nick Lowe	Dec. 2024
64 | 958	The 8 Deaths of Spider-Man - Part 4: King of Pain	Ireland/Melnikov	Nick Lowe	Dec. 2024
65 | 959	The 8 Deaths of Spider-Man - Part 5: Signifying Nothing	Kelly/CAFU	Nick Lowe	Jan. 2025
65.DEATHS	The 8 Deaths of Spider-Man - Death and the Spider	Derek Landy/Kev Walker	Nick Lowe	Jan. 2025
66 | 960	The 8 Deaths of Spider-Man - Part 6: No More	Ireland/Andrea Broccardo	Nick Lowe	Jan. 2025
67 | 961	The 8 Deaths of Spider-Man - Part 7: Nothing Stops	Ireland/Broccardo/Henrichon	Nick Lowe	Feb. 2025
68 | 962	The 8 Deaths of Spider-Man - Part 8: Four Lives to Live	Ireland/Broccardo	Nick Lowe	Feb. 2025
68.DEATHS	The 8 Deaths of Spider-Man - Cain is Able	Christos Gage/Mark Buckingham	Nick Lowe	Feb. 2025
69 | 963	The 8 Deaths of Spider-Man - Part 9: Acceptable Losses	Kelly/McGuinness	Nick Lowe	March 2025
70 | 964	The 8 Deaths of Spider-Man - Part 10: Nothing Can Stop the Spider-Naut	Kelly/McGuinness	Nick Lowe	March 2025

== The Amazing Spider-Man #965–current (April 2025 – present) ==
=== The Amazing Spider-Man (vol. 7) #1–current (April 2025 – present) ===
Issue #	Title	Author / Illustrator	Editor	Release date
1 | 965	Main Story	Joe Kelly/Pepe Larraz	Nick Lowe	April 2025
ALIVE & THWIPPING! The next era of AMAZING SPIDER-MAN has arrived! Peter is, shockingly, without a job and looking for gainful employment, but his job search is interrupted by a RAMPAGING RHINO who is but the tip of a sinister iceberg. What major Spider-Villain is working behind the scenes weaponizing other Spider-Villains including one we haven't seen in OVER SEVEN YEARS?! Also, what is that Goblin-free Norman Osborn up to anyway?
	Death to the Tyrant	Kelly/John Romita, Jr.		
2 | 966		Kelly/Larraz	Nick Lowe	April 2025
RHINO RAMPAGE! What amped Rhino up from criminal super-bruiser to rampaging disaster machine? We aren't spilling, but it just amped up Spider-Man! That's right, Spider-Man is going in and out of control of his senses trying to figure out how to get full control of his body. And the only people who can help are Norman Osborn and... Peter's long-lost childhood best friend?!
3 | 967		Kelly/Larraz	Nick Lowe	May 2025
PUMPKIN BOMB PROBLEMS! Past and present collide sending Spider-Man spinning OUT OF CONTROL - just when an old foe obsessed with him gets the sword-stabbing jump on Peter and his main squeeze, Shay Marken! Can the last remaining ally still in Spidey's corner, the GREEN GOBLIN, Norman Osborn, cure Peter before his entire life implodes?!
4 | 968		Kelly/Larraz	Nick Lowe	May 2025
The cause of Spider-Man's and Rhino's rampages - and the mastermind behind it - is revealed! Norman Osborn ain't the only GOBLIN back in Peter's so-called life!
5 | 969		Kelly/Larraz	Nick Lowe	June 2025
NO HOPE AGAINST THE HOBGOBLIN! As HOBGOBLIN's assault tears SPIDER-MAN's mind (and limbs) apart, Kingsley unleashes his wrath on those nearest and dearest to Peter Parker. And this is a deadly race against time Spider-Man can't afford to lose - even as he risks losing his sanity to win!
6 | 970		Kelly/Romita Jr.	Nick Lowe	June 2025
Hellgate's opening... punch! Peter Parker's life has been worse. He's got a steady job. Black Cat is giving him the time of day again. As Spider-Man, Peter's taken some super-powered punches. But he's never caught the kind of Hell that's in store for him next.
7 | 971		Kelly/Romita Jr.	Nick Lowe	July 2025
THE HELLGATE IS OPEN! Spider-Man is fighting for his life - literally - as he tries to keep Hellgate from destroying Manhattan. But what does this strange new foe want? And can Peter figure it out before his day gets a whole lot worse?!
8 | 972		Kelly/Romita Jr./Todd Nuack	Nick Lowe	July 2025
TIME TO DIE, SPIDER-MAN! The city watches as Spider-Man takes the worst beating of his life. What can Spider-Man do to rally? There MUST be something!
9 | 973		Kelly/Michael Dowling	Nick Lowe	August 2025
SPIDER-MAN'S SHOCKING DEFEAT! Battered and broken following his battle with HELLGATE, SPIDER-MAN needs to level up if he's going to survive the next round. Peter Parker is a different man following Hellgate's revelation. But MARY JANE WATSON has a revelation of her own to share! And the first foes to put Spidey's strength to the test are SHOCKER and his new allies, THE AFTERSHOCKS!
10 | 974		Kelly/Dowling	Nick Lowe	August 2025
THE RESOLUTE SPIDER-MAN! Peter Parker has resolved to get stronger by ANY means necessary. Spider-Man isn't pulling his punches this time.
11 | 975	Broken Mirror	Kelly/Romita Jr.	Nick Lowe	September 2025
SPIDEY GOES COSMIC! A tale of two Spider-Men... One Spider-Man swings around New York City meting out justice in an unfriendly matter. Another Spider-Man is found in a distant solar system running with strange companions. One such companion? A stranger named SYMBIE making his FIRST APPEARANCE! The next major chapter in Spider-Man's life begins here!
	Broken Man	Kelly/Larraz		
	Rapid Return	Saladin Ahmed/Pere Pérez		
	Spider-Mayonaise	Lee Gatlin		
	In the City With... Spider-man	Jason Loo		
12 | 976		Kelly/Ed McGuiness	Nick Lowe	September 2025
STOP SPIDER-MAN! Spider-Man's gone too far. Now his greatest allies must stop him before it's too late!
13 | 977		Kelly/Larraz	Nick Lowe	October 2025
SPIDEY & HIS COSMIC FRIENDS! Who is this space-faring Spider-Man, and who is his crew?! You may recognize Rocket Raccoon and may have heard of Symbie. The other companions will have a huge impact on Spider-Man and may hold a key to some mysteries that have been brewing!
14 | 978		Kelly/McGuiness/Nuack	Nick Lowe	October 2025
ENTER: THE GOBLIN SLAYER! Something has been trying to kill Norman Osborn since the first issue of this volume, and they up the ante this issue! What can Spider-Man do to stop the Goblin Slayer? With all that Norman has done and could do, SHOULD Spidey stop it?
15 | 979		Kelly/Emilio Laiso	Nick Lowe	November 2025
THE SECRETS OF SPACE REVEALED! Spider-Man takes on a challenge of single combat to save his new crew and finds himself between a rock and a GIANT ALIEN BEAST INTENT ON HIS DEATH! Not only does Spider-Man learn aspects of his quest that he didn't expect, but his companions learn things about Spider-Man that THEY didn't expect. Witness the first full appearance of a new major character!
16 | 980		Kelly/Romita Jr.	Nick Lowe	November 2025
THE RESOLUTE SPIDER-SLAYER! Part of being Spider-Man is facing horrific scientifically wondrous SPIDER-SLAYERS! This new Spider-Slayer is particularly dangerous and endangers not only Spider-Man but the new teen hero KINTSUGI! Aunt May drops some wisdom that you won't forget anytime soon!
17 | 981		Kelly/Larraz	Nick Lowe	December 2025
SPIDEY SPACED OUT! Peter Parker is LOST IN SPACE with no way home! Does he even WANT to return after his shocking defeat at the hands of HELLGATE?! The cosmos ain't the friendliest of neighborhoods for Spidey and his galactic gang of outlaws. If they don't learn to work together FAST, they'll never leave the planet they're currently stranded on ALIVE!
18 | 982		Kelly/Romita Jr.	Nick Lowe	December 2025
ONCE A GOBLIN... Norman Osborn may not be the real Spider-Man, but he's the Spider-Man NYC's got. Despite Norman doing his very best to do good, everyone, including Peter Parker's allies, is trying to take him down. And someone or something(s) is hunting GOBLINS... and they're finally ready to spring their terrifying trap!
19 | 983		Kelly/Larraz	Nick Lowe	January 2026
SPIDEY VS. HELLGATE, ROUND TWO! The spacefaring SPIDER-MAN heads back to Earth - only to find HELLGATE standing in his way! Spider-Man's finally strong enough to beat the most powerful foe he's ever faced... right?!
20 | 984		Kelly/Romita Jr./Paco Diaz/Nuack	Nick Lowe	January 2026
NIGHT OF THE GOBLIN (SLAYERS)! Norman Osborn may be purged of his sins, but that doesn't mean they can't still come back to haunt him! HOBGOBLIN wants Norman out of the SPIDER-MAN game (and this life) for good - and he's got the hyper-lethal tech of an entire goblin-slaying army at his disposal. What does Norman have...?! A Spider-Man or Woman or two who trust him as far as they can throw him...
21 | 985		Kelly/Romita Jr./Nuack	Nick Lowe	February 2026
DAWN OF THE GOBLIN SLAYERS PART TWO! The sins of Norman Osborn come back to haunt him and everyone he cares about! Norman and the other Spiders THROW DOWN against Hobgoblin and his Goblin Slayer army! And one of the Spiders makes the ultimate sacrifice!
22 | 986		Kelly/Nick Bradshaw/Nuack/Nathan Stockman	Nick Lowe	February 2026
TOO LITTLE, TOO LATE! The era of space/earth Spider-Men comes to an end and everyone is left to pick up the pieces. We are about to enter DEATH SPIRAL so Spidey better take a deep, deep breath.
23 | 987		Kelly/McGuinness	Nick Lowe	March 2026
SHOCKED BY THE SINISTER SYMBIOTE! DEATH SPIRAL PART TWO! CARNAGE. KNOWS. Which means SPIDEY and VENOM team up again to stop the serial killer-symbiote. But instead of EDDIE BROCK, Peter uncovers another bombshell beneath Venom’s mask – MARY JANE WATSON! And that’s just the first SHOCKING REVELATION of this issue! Carnage isn’t the only problem…Peter and MJ are going to have to patch things up if they want a fighting chance to stop new hyper-lethal villain, TORMENT’s killing spree.
24 | 988		Charles Soule/Kelly/Jesús Saiz	Nick Lowe	March 2026
CARNAGE MEETS ITS MATCH!? DEATH SPIRAL PART FOUR! Carnage faces off against Torment while the serial killer’s latest murder leaves the Spidey-Symbiote Alliance shaken.
25 | 989		Kelly/McGuinness/Pepe Pérez	Nick Lowe	March 2026
UNRELENTING TORMENT… DEATH SPIRAL PART FIVE! …for Spider-Man, Venom and Carnage leads to the most unexpected team-up in Spidey History! But even if Spidey wins, he may still lose…because Torment learns not one, but two shocking truths about his foes!
26 | 990		Kelly/Francesco Manna/McGuinness	Nick Lowe	April 2026
DEATH SPIRAL PART SEVEN! SPIDER-MAN is the LAST hero standing against TORMENT’S onslaught! MJ, Eddie and Dylan are in Torment’s sights. Peter can’t save them all! And Torment’s newest ALLY just tipped the scales in the serial killer’s favor!
27 | 991		Kelly/McGuinness	Nick Lowe	April 22, 2026
DEATH SPIRAL - CONCLUSION! Torment will get away with murder. Unless SPIDER-MAN does the UNTHINKABLE…
28 | 992		Kelly/Cory Smith	Nick Lowe	May 6, 2026
SPIDER-MAN's buried in unfinished business after his battle with Torment, Venom, and Carnage AND his long absence from Earth. Get his life back together? Later. Damage control at work? Not now. Time-traveling magical threat to all of space and time? Go, Spidey, go!
29 | 993		Kelly/Pete Woods	Nick Lowe	May 22, 2026
BEST FR(ENEMIES)! Spider-Man's best friend's life shattered by a terrible accident - and Peter Parker is to blame! Is there a new villain on Spidey's block?
30 | 994		Kelly/Woods	Nick Lowe	June 3, 2026
SPIDEY VS. SPORE! SPORE is spreading, and it's all SPIDER-MAN's fault! But should Peter even BE fighting in a tragedy of his own making?! And DON'T MISS the answers to an earth-shattering riddle from the battle with Torment in ASM/VENOM "Death Spiral"!
31 | 995		Kelly/Patrick Gleason	Nick Lowe	June 17, 2026
THE TALK... Peter Parker's world will never be the same. Don't miss one of the most pivotal issues in Spider-Man history!
32 | 996		Kelly/Gleason	Nick Lowe	July 1, 2026
VULTURE-LY ASSURED DESTRUCTION! SPIDER-MAN battles the VULTURE - who has a few new tricks up his wing! And the world-shattering revelations of issue #31 continue! PLUS: A SPECIAL BACKUP STORY CELEBRATING DISABILITY PRIDE MONTH!
33 | 997		Kelly/Ed McGuinness	Nick Lowe	July 22, 2026
When an old foe resurfaces, Spider-Man gets an assist from DAMAGE CONTROL? Don't they usually clean up AFTER the fight? Meanwhile, learn more about Peter's mystery cousin and walk the road to AMAZING SPIDER-MAN #1000!
34 | 998		Kelly/Ed McGuinness	Nick Lowe	August 5, 2026
CLEANUP ON ISLE MANHATTAN! SPIDER-MAN is back in the swing of things thanks to a recent team-up with the all-new, all-different DAMAGE CONTROL - until ELECTRO short-circuits Spidey's big plans!

== Upcoming issues of The Amazing Spider-Man ==
Note: This information is based from the company's official solicitations, and thus, always subject to change, as these issues have not been released yet.

Issue #	Title	Author / Illustrator	Editor	Release date
35 | 999		Kelly/Francesco Manna	Nick Lowe	August 26, 2026
36 | 1000		Kelly/Camuncoli/Gleason/Mcguinness/Ramos	Nick Lowe	September 30, 2026
37 | 1001		Kelly/Pepe Larraz	Nick Lowe	October 14, 2026
38 | 1002		Kelly/Pepe Larraz	Nick Lowe	October 28, 2026

== The Amazing Spider-Man Annual ==
Issue #	Author / Illustrator	Release date
1	Stan Lee / Steve Ditko	1964
"The Sinister Six!" : Doctor Octopus kidnaps Aunt May and Betty Brant and plans to pit Spider-Man against a cadre of villains made up of himself, Electro, Kraven the Hunter, Mysterio, the Sandman, and the Vulture
FEATURES: "A Gallery of Spider-Man's Most Famous Foes!" – Full-page illustrations of "the Burglar" (the man that killed Uncle Ben), the Chameleon, the Vulture, the Terrible Tinkerer, Doctor Octopus, the Sandman, Doctor Doom, the Lizard, the Living Brain, Electro, the Enforcers, Mysterio, the Green Goblin, and Kraven the Hunter; "The Secrets of Spider-Man!" – information on Spider-Man's strength, powers and abilities; also single-page illustrations of Peter Parker's classmates, home, guest stars appearing in Amazing Spider-Man, "How Stan Lee and Steve Ditko Create Spider-Man!"
2	Lee / Ditko	1965
"The Wondrous World of Doctor Strange": Spider-Man and Doctor Strange join forces; also includes reprints of Amazing Spider-Man #1, "The Uncanny Threat of the Terrible Tinkerer" (Amazing Spider-Man #2) and "Marked for Destruction by Dr. Doom!" (Amazing Spider-Man #5).
FEATURES: "A Gallery of Spider-Man's Most Famous Foes!" – full-page illustrations of "the Circus of Crime" (Amazing Spider-Man #16 and 22), the Scorpion, the Beetle, Jonah's robot (Amazing Spider-Man #25), and the Crime-Master
3	Lee / Don Heck	1966
"...To Become an Avenger!" : Spider-Man tries to join the Avengers and battles the Hulk. Also includes reprints of "Turning Point" and "Unmasked by Dr. Octopus!" (Amazing Spider-Man #11-12).
4	Lee / Larry Lieber	1967
"The Web and the Flame" : Spider-Man and the Human Torch battle Mysterio and the Wizard; later reprinted in Giant-Size Spider-Man #6, the last issue of that series
FEATURES: "The Coffee Bean Barn!" – two-page illustration of Peter's and his friend's favorite hangout; "What the Well-Dressed Spider-Man Will Wear" – a look at Spider-Man's costume and equipment; "Spidey's Greatest Talent" – shows Spider-Man's ability to climb walls and spin webs; "Say 'Hello' To Spidey's Favorite Foes!" – a two-page montage with the Green Goblin, the Lovable Lizard, Kraven the Hunter, Darlin' Doc Ock, the Sinister Sandman, the New Vulture, Ever-Lovin' Electro, and the Rampaging Rhino; "A Visit to Petey's Pad" – a two-page spread with a look inside Peter and Harry Osborn's apartment.
5	Lee / Lieber	1968
"The Parents of Peter Parker!" : Spider-Man travels to Algiers and discovers what happened to his parents, battles the Red Skull.
FEATURES: "A Day at the Daily Bugle"; "Peter Parker, the Super Sports Star!" – A look at what Peter's life would be like if he played sports; "Where It's At!" – a map of New York City with locations for Peter's apartment, Aunt May's home, The Daily Bugle, Empire State University, the Coffee Bean Barn; "This is Spidey As We Know Him, But..." – Spider-Man illustrated as different cartoon characters like Dick Tracy and Charlie Brown; "Here We Go-A-Plotting!" – a satirical look how Stan Lee, Larry Lieber, and John Romita create a Spider-Man story.
6		1969
Reprints "The Sinister Six!" story from Amazing Spider-Man Annual #1; also contains "The Fabulous Fantastic Four Meet Spider-Man", a condensed version of the first time Spider-Man and the Fantastic Four met, told in the Amazing Spider-Man #1 story "Spider-Man vs. the Chameleon"; reprints "Spider-Man Tackles the Torch" from Amazing Spider-Man #8
7		1970
Reprints "Spider-Man vs. the Chameleon!" from Amazing Spider-Man #1, "Duel to the Death with the Vulture!" from Amazing Spider-Man #2 and "Just a Guy Named Joe" from Amazing Spider-Man #38; also features full-page portraits of Spider-Man, Mary Jane Watson, and Spider-Man battling Mysterio, Electro, and the Sandman
8		1971
Reprints "The Sinister Shocker!" from Amazing Spider-Man #46, "On the Trail of Spider-Man!" from Tales to Astonish #57, and "Spider-Man No More!" from Amazing Spider-Man #50
9	Lee / John Romita Sr.	1973
"The Goblin Lives!": a revised color version of Spectacular Spider-Man magazine #2 (Nov. 1968), Norman Osborn becomes the Green Goblin again
10	Bill Mantlo / Gil Kane	1976
"Step into my Parlor...Said the Spider to the Fly!" – the first appearance of the Fly (Richard Deacon)
11	Bill Mantlo / Don Perlin	1977
"Spawn of the Spider"; second story: "Chaos at the Coffee Bean!"
12		1978
Reprints Amazing Spider-Man #119-120 (Spider-Man vs. the Hulk)
13		1979
The first part of Doctor Octopus's mysterious and deadly plan, concluded in Peter Parker, The Spectacular Spider-Man Annual #1
14	Dennis O'Neil / Frank Miller	1980
Spider-Man and Doctor Strange, the Sorcerer Supreme, team up against Doctor Doom and the Dread Dormammu! 'Nuff said!
15	Dennis O'Neil / Frank Miller	1981
Spider-Man battles the Punisher and Doctor Octopus
16	Roger Stern / John Romita Sr. and John Romita Jr	1982
"Who's that Lady? Call Her Captain Marvel" – the first appearance of the second Captain Marvel
17		1983
"Heroes and Villains" – Peter Parker's class reunion
18	Lee / Ron Frenz	1984
"The Scorpion Takes A Bride!"
19		1985
"Fun n' Games" – Alistair Smythe attacks Mary Jane, Mary Jane is seen on the cover with the Spider-Man costume on
20	Ken McDonald/ Mark Beachum	1986
"Man of the Year" – Spider-Man battles a time-traveling Iron Man 2020 attempting to stop a future act of terrorism
21	David Michelinie/James Shooter/Paul Ryan	1987
"The Wedding" – Peter Parker marries Mary Jane Watson
22		1988
Story 1: "Drug War Rages" (Tom DeFalco / Mark Bagley).
Story 2: "He Who Laughs" (Ditko / Roger Stern) with Speedball
Story 3: "Kindred Spirits" (Mark Gruenwald/Ron Lim) with the High Evolutionary (part of The Evolutionary War storyline)
23		1989
Spider-Man and the She-Hulk battle the Abomination
24		1990
Spider-Man and Ant-Man
25		1991
Main story: "The Vibranium Vendetta"; sub-stories – "The Origin of the Amazing Spider-Man", the Outlaws in "Outlaws of Justice Part One", Venom in "Truckstop of Doom" and Chance in "Second Chance"
26		1992
Main story: "The Hero Killers Pt. 1: Fortune and Steel"; sub-stories: "First Kill", "The Wronged Man", "Making the Grade" and "Evil's Light Part One: Now Strikes the Lightmaster"
27		1993
Story 1: "Prepare Yourself for...Annex!" (Jack C. Harris / Tom Lyle)
Story 2: "Dead Reckoning" (Eric Fein / Scott Kolins)
Story 3: "The Lizard Must Be Destroyed" (Mike Lackey / Aaron Lopresti)
Story 4: "Estrangements and Reunions" (Eric Fein / Larry Alexander)
28		1994
Main story: "Carnage is Back: The Mortal Past"; sub-stories: "Fatal Instinct", "Mr. Smith Goes to Town" and "No Son of Mine"
Amazing Spider-Man Annual '96		1996
Amazing Spider-Man Annual '97		1997
Amazing Spider-Man/Devil Dinosaur Annual '98		1998
"Duel with Devil Dinosaur"
Amazing Spider-Man Annual 1999		1999
Amazing Spider-Man Annual 2000		2000
Amazing Spider-Man Annual 2001		2001
35	Marc Guggenheim / Mike McKone	2008
The identity of Jackpot is revealed
36	Marc Guggenheim / Pat Olliffe	2009
The lead-up to Aunt May and J. Jonah Jameson Sr.'s wedding
37		2010
The story of Spider-Man's first team-up with Captain America
38	John Layman / Lee Garbett	2011
"Identity Wars" Part 1 of 3
39	Brian Reed / Lee Garbett	2012
"Spider Who?"
1 (Legacy #40)	Shawn Ryan / Brandon Peterson	2014
"I Can't Help Myself" / "The A-May-zing Spider-Aunt" / "The Quiet Room"
1 (Legacy #41)	Humberto Ramos / Francisco Herrera	2017
"Mask of Death" / "Neon Dragon" / "Whose Crime Is It, Anyway?"
42	Dan Slott / Cory Smith	2018
"Bury the Ledes"
1 (Legacy #43)	Saladin Ahmed / Garry Brown	2018
"Ties that Bind"
2 (Legacy #44)	Karla Pacheco / Eleonora Carlini	2021
Part of the Infinite Destinies story arc
1 (Legacy #45)	Erica Schultz / Julian Shaw	2023
"Break In/Break Out" – Hallows Eve (Janine) attempts to break Chasm (Ben Reilly) out of his prison in Limbo
1 (Legacy #46)	Derek Landy / Ron Lim	2024
First story; second story: "The Death Stone Saga: Chapter Two"

== The Amazing Spider-Man Trade Paperbacks ==
=== The Complete Clone Saga Epic (August 1994 – August 1995) ===
Volume #	Title	Author / Illustrator	Time Period
1	The Complete Clone Saga Epic, Vol. 1	Various	August 1994 – October 1994
Web of Spider-Man #117-119, The Amazing Spider-Man Vol. 1 #394, Spider-Man #51-53, Spectacular Spider-Man #217, Spider-Man: The Lost Years #0-3, Spider-Man Unlimited #7.
2	The Complete Clone Saga Epic, Vol. 2	Various	September 1994 – January 1995
The Amazing Spider-Man Vol. 1 #395-399, Spectacular Spider-Man #218-221, Spider-Man #54-56, Spider-Man Unlimited #8, Web of Spider-Man #120-122, Spider-Man: Funeral for an Octopus #1-3.
3	The Complete Clone Saga Epic, Vol. 3	Various	February 1995 – March 1995
The Amazing Spider-Man Vol. 1 #400-401 & Super Special, Spectacular Spider-Man #222-224 & Super Special, Spider-Man #57-58 & Super Special, Spider-Man Unlimited #9, Web of Spider-Man #123-124 & Super Special, Spider-Man: The Clone Journal, Venom Super Special.
4	The Complete Clone Saga Epic, Vol. 4	Various	April 1995 – June 1995
The Amazing Spider-Man Vol. 1 #402-404, Spectacular Spider-Man #225-227, Spider-Man #59-61, Web of Spider-Man #125-127, New Warriors #61, Spider-Man: The Jackal Files, Spider-Man: Maximum Clonage Alpha & Omega.
5	The Complete Clone Saga Epic, Vol. 5	Various	July 1995 – August 1995
Web of Spider-Man #128-129 & Super Special, The Amazing Spider-Man Vol. 1 #405-406 & Super Special, Spider-Man #62-63 & Super Special, Spider-Man Unlimited #10, Spectacular Spider-Man #228-229 & Super Special, Venom Super Special, New Warriors #62, Spider-Man Team-Up #1, Spider-Man: The Parker Years.

=== The Complete Ben Reilly Epic (September 1995 – October 1996) ===
Volume #	Title	Author / Illustrator	Time Period
1	The Complete Ben Reilly Epic, Vol. 1	Various	September 1995 – October 1995
Web of Scarlet Spider #1-2, The Amazing Scarlet Spider #1-2, Scarlet Spider #1-2, Spectacular Scarlet Spider #1-2, Green Goblin #3 and Sensational Spider-Man #0, Spider-Man Unlimited #1, New Warriors #65-66, Spider-Man: The Parker Years.
2	The Complete Ben Reilly Epic, Vol. 2	Various	November 1995 – December 1995
The Amazing Spider-Man Vol. 1 #407-408, New Warriors #67, Sensational Spider-Man #1, Spectacular Spider-Man #230, Spider-Man #64-65, Spider-Man/Punisher: Family Plot #1-2, Web of Scarlet Spider #3-4, Spider-Man Holiday Special, Venom: Along Came a Spider #1-4.
3	The Complete Ben Reilly Epic, Vol. 3	Various	January 1996 – February 1996
The Amazing Spider-Man Vol. 1 #409-410, Sensational Spider-Man #2-3, Spectacular Spider-Man #231-233, Spider-Man #66-67, Spider-Man: The Final Adventure #1-4, Spider-Man Team-Up #2, Spider-Man Unlimited #11.
4	The Complete Ben Reilly Epic, Vol. 4	Various	March 1996 – May 1996
The Amazing Spider-Man Vol. 1 #411-413, Daredevil #354, Sensational Spider-Man #4-6, Spectacular Spider-Man #234, Spider-Man #68-70, Spider-Man: Redemption #1-4, Spider-Man Team-Up #3, Spider-Man Unlimited #12.
5	The Complete Ben Reilly Epic, Vol. 5	Various	June 1996 – August 1996
The Amazing Spider-Man Vol. 1 #414-416, Annual '96, Sensational Spider-Man #7-10, Spectacular Spider-Man #235-239, Spider-Man #71-72, Spider-Man Team-Up #4, Spider-Man Unlimited #13.
6	The Complete Ben Reilly Epic, Vol. 6	Various	September 1996 – October 1996
The Amazing Spider-Man Vol. 1 #417-418, Sensational Spider-Man #11, Spectacular Spider-Man #240-241, Spider-Man #73-75, Spider-Man Team-Up #5, Spider-Man Unlimited #14, Spider-Man: 101 Ways to end the Clone Saga, Spider-Man: Revelations, Spider-Man: The Osborn Journal.

=== Amazing Spider-Man by J. Michael Straczynski (April 2001 – December 2007) ===
Volume #	Title	Author / Illustrator	Time Period
1	Coming Home	J. Michael Straczynski/John Romita, Jr.	April 2001 – September 2001
The Amazing Spider-Man Vol. 2 #30-35.
2	Revelations	J. Michael Straczynski/John Romita, Jr.	October 2001 – January 2002
The Amazing Spider-Man Vol. 2 #36-39.
3	Until the Stars Turn Cold	J. Michael Straczynski/John Romita, Jr.	February 2002 – September 2002
The Amazing Spider-Man Vol. 2 #40-45.
4	The Life and Death of Spiders	J. Michael Straczynski/John Romita, Jr.	November 2002 – February 2003
The Amazing Spider-Man Vol. 2 #46-50.
5	Unintended Consequences	J. Michael Straczynski/John Romita, Jr.	March 2003 – August 2003
The Amazing Spider-Man Vol. 2 #51-56.
6	Happy Birthday	J. Michael Straczynski/John Romita, Jr.	September 2003 – December 2003
The Amazing Spider-Man Vol. 2 #57-58, The Amazing Spider-Man, Vol. 1 #500-502.
7	The Book of Ezekiel	J. Michael Straczynski/John Romita, Jr.	January 2004 – June 2004
The Amazing Spider-Man Vol. 1 #503-508.
8	Sins Past	J. Michael Straczynski/Mike Deodato, Jr.	June 2004 – November 2004
The Amazing Spider-Man Vol. 1 #509-514.
9	Skin Deep	J. Michael Straczynski/Mike Deodato, Jr./Mark Brooks	December 2004 – March 2005
The Amazing Spider-Man Vol. 1 #515-518.
10	New Avengers	J. Michael Straczynski/Mike Deodato, Jr.	April 2005 – September 2005
The Amazing Spider-Man Vol. 1 #519-524.
11	The Other	Various	October 2005 – January 2006
Friendly Neighborhood Spider-Man #1-4, Marvel Knights: Spider-Man #19-22, The Amazing Spider-Man Vol. 1 #525-528.
12	The Road to Civil War	Various	February 2006 – April 2006
New Avengers: Illuminati #1, Fantastic Four #536-537, The Amazing Spider-Man Vol. 1 #529-531.
13	Civil War	J. Michael Straczynski/Ron Garney	May 2006 – February 2007
The Amazing Spider-Man Vol. 1 #532-538.
14	Back in Black	J. Michael Straczynski/Ron Garney	March 2007 – August 2007
The Amazing Spider-Man Vol. 1 #539-543.
15	One More Day	J. Michael Straczynski/Joe Quesada	September 2007 – December 2007
The Amazing Spider-Man Vol. 1 #544-545, Friendly Neighborhood Spider-Man #24, The Sensational Spider-Man #41.

=== Brand New Day (January 2008 – November 2009) ===
Volume #	Title	Author / Illustrator	Time Period
1	Brand New Day, Vol. 1	Dan Slott/Steve McNiven, Marc Guggenheim/Salvador Larocca	January 2008 – February 2008
The Amazing Spider-Man: Swing Shift Director's Cut #1, Venom Super Special, The Amazing Spider-Man Vol. 1 #546-551.
2	Brand New Day, Vol. 2	Bob Gale/Phil Jimenez/Barry Kitson, Zeb Wells/Chris Bachalo	March 2008 – May 2008
The Amazing Spider-Man Vol. 1 #552-558.
3	Brand New Day, Vol. 3	Dan Slott/Marcos Martin, Bob Gale/Mike McKone	May 2008 – June 2008
The Amazing Spider-Man Vol. 1 #559-563.
4	Kraven's First Hunt	Marc Guggenheim/Phil Jimenez	July 2008 – August 2008
The Amazing Spider-Man Vol. 1 #564-567.
5	New Ways to Die	Dan Slott/John Romita, Jr.	August 2008 – October 2008
The Amazing Spider-Man Vol. 1 #568-573.
6	Crime and Punisher	Marc Guggenheim/Barry Kitson, Joe Kelly/Chris Bachalo, Zeb Wells/Paolo Rivera	October 2008 – November 2008
The Amazing Spider-Man Vol. 1 #574-577.
7	Death and Dating	Mark Waid/Marcos Martin, Roger Stern/Lee Weeks, Dan Slott/Mike McKone	November 2008 – January 2009
The Amazing Spider-Man Vol. 1 #578-583, Annual #35.
8	Election Day	Marc Guggenheim/John Romita, Jr.	January 2009 – March 2009
The Amazing Spider-Man Vol. 1 #583-588.
9	24/7	Dan Slott/Barry Kitson, Mark Waid/Mike McKone	March 2009 – May 2009
The Amazing Spider-Man Vol. 1 #589-594.
10	American Son	Joe Kelly/Marco Checchetto	May 2009 – July 2009
The Amazing Spider-Man Vol. 1 #595-599.
11	Died in Your Arms Tonight	Dan Slott/John Romita, Jr., Mark Waid/Mario Alberti	July 2009 – August 2009
The Amazing Spider-Man Vol. 1 #600-601, Annual #36, Amazing Spider-Man Family #7.
12	Red Headed Stranger	Fred Van Lente/Barry Kitson	August 2009 – September 2009
The Amazing Spider-Man Vol. 1 #602-605.
13	Return of the Black Cat	Joe Kelly/Mike McKone, Marc Guggenheim/Marco Checchetto	September 2009 – November 2009
The Amazing Spider-Man Vol. 1 #606-611.

=== The Gauntlet and Grim Hunt (November 2009 – November 2010) ===
Volume #	Title	Author / Illustrator	Time Period
1	The Gauntlet, Vol. 1 – Electro and Sandman	Mark Waid/Paul Azaceta, Fred Van Lente/Javier Pulido	November 2009 – December 2009
The Amazing Spider-Man Vol. 1 #612-616, Web of Spider-Man #2.
2	The Gauntlet, Vol. 2 – Rhino and Mysterio	Dan Slott/Marcos Martin/Michael Lark, Joe Kelly/Max Fiumara	January 2010 – February 2010
The Amazing Spider-Man Vol. 1 #617-621, Web of Spider-Man #3-4.
3	The Gauntlet, Vol. 3 – Vulture and Morbius	Various	February 2010 – March 2010
The Amazing Spider-Man Vol. 1 #622-625, Web of Spider-Man #2, 5.
4	The Gauntlet, Vol. 4 – Juggernaut	Roger Stern/Lee Weeks/John Romita, Jr.	March 2010 – April 2010
The Amazing Spider-Man Vol. 1 #229-230, 626–629.
5	The Gauntlet, Vol. 5 – Lizard	Zeb Wells/Chris Bachalo	May 2010
The Amazing Spider-Man Vol. 1 #630-633, Web of Spider-Man #6.
6	Grim Hunt	Joe Kelly/Stan Lee/J.M. DeMatteis/Michael Lark/Marcos Martin/Max Fiumara	June 2010 – July 2010
The Amazing Spider-Man Vol. 1 #634-637, Web of Spider-Man #7, Spider-Man: Origin of the Hunter.
7	One Moment in Time	Joe Quesada/Paolo Rivera	July 2010 – August 2010
The Amazing Spider-Man Vol. 1 #638-641.
8	Origin of the Species	Mark Waid/Paul Azaceta	September 2010 – November 2010
The Amazing Spider-Man Vol. 1 #642-647.

=== Amazing Spider-Man by Dan Slott (November 2010 – December 2012) ===
Volume #	Title	Author / Illustrator	Time Period
1	Big Time	Dan Slott/Humberto Ramos	November 2010 – December 2010
The Amazing Spider-Man Vol. 1 #648-651.
2	Matters of Life and Death	Dan Slott/Stefano Caselli/Marcos Martin	January 2011 – March 2011
The Amazing Spider-Man Vol. 1 #652-657, 654.1.
3	The Fantastic Spider-Man	Dan Slott/Stefano Caselli, Christos Gage/Reilly Brown	April 2011 – May 2011
The Amazing Spider-Man Vol. 1 #658-662.
4	The Return of Anti-Venom	Dan Slott/Giuseppe Camuncoli	June 2011 – July 2011
The Amazing Spider-Man Vol. 1 #663-665, Free Comic Book Day: Amazing Spider-Man (2011).
5	Spider-Island	Dan Slott/Humberto Ramos	July 2011 – November 2011
The Amazing Spider-Man Vol. 1 #666-673, Venom #6-9, Spider-Island: Infested #1, Spider-Island: Deadly Foes #1.
6	Flying Blind	Dan Slott/Giuseppe Camuncoli/Humberto Ramos, Mark Waid/Emma Rios	November 2011 – January 2012
The Amazing Spider-Man Vol. 1 #674-677, Daredevil, Vol. 3 #8.
7	Trouble on the Horizon	Dan Slott/Christopher Yost/Humberto Ramos/Giuseppe Camuncoli	January 2012 – March 2012
The Amazing Spider-Man Vol. 1 #678-681, 679.1.
8	Ends of the Earth	Dan Slott/Stefano Caselli/Humberto Ramos	March 2012 – June 2012
The Amazing Spider-Man Vol. 1 #682-687, Ends of the Earth #1, Avenging Spider-Man #8.
9	Lizard – No Turning Back	Dan Slott/Giuseppe Camuncoli	June 2012 – August 2012
The Amazing Spider-Man Vol. 1 #688-691, Untold Tales of Spider-Man #9.
10	Danger Zone	Dan Slott/Christos Gage/Giuseppe Camuncoli/Humberto Ramos	August 2012 – November 2012
The Amazing Spider-Man Vol. 1 #692-697, Avenging Spider-Man #11.
11	Dying Wish	Dan Slott/Humberto Ramos	November 2012 – December 2012
The Amazing Spider-Man Vol. 1 #698-700.
N/A	Peter Parker: The One and Only	David Morrell/Klaus Janson, Joe Casey/Timmothy Green II, Brian Reed/Sean Chen	December 2013
The Amazing Spider-Man Vol. 1 #700.1-700.5.

=== Superior Spider-Man (January 2013 – April 2014) ===
Volume #	Title	Author / Illustrator	Time Period
1	My Own Worst Enemy	Dan Slott/Ryan Stegman/Giuseppe Camuncoli	January 2013 – March 2013
Superior Spider-Man Vol. 1 #1-5.
2	A Troubled Mind	Dan Slott/Humberto Ramos/Ryan Stegman	March 2013 – May 2013
Superior Spider-Man Vol. 1 #6-10.
3	No Escape	Dan Slott/Christos Gage/Humberto Ramos/Giuseppe Camuncoli	June 2013 – August 2013
Superior Spider-Man Vol. 1 #11-16.
4	Necessary Evil	Dan Slott/Ryan Stegman/Giuseppe Camuncoli/John Dell	September 2013 – November 2013
Superior Spider-Man Vol. 1 #17-21.
5	Superior Venom	Dan Slott/Christos Gage/Humberto Ramos	November 2013 – January 2014
Superior Spider-Man Vol. 1 #22-26, Annual #1.
6	Goblin Nation	Dan Slott/Christos Gage/Giuseppe Camuncoli	February 2014 – April 2014
Superior Spider-Man Vol. 1 #27-31, Annual #2.

=== Amazing Spider-Man by Dan Slott (April 2014 – May 2015) ===
Volume #	Title	Author / Illustrator	Time Period
1	The Parker Luck	Dan Slott/Humberto Ramos	April 2014 – September 2014
The Amazing Spider-Man Vol. 3 #1-6.
N/A	Learning to Crawl	Dan Slott/Ramon Perez	May 2014 – September 2014
The Amazing Spider-Man Vol. 3 #1.1-1.5.
2	Spider-Verse Prologue	Dan Slott/Christos Gage/Giuseppe Camuncoli	August 2014 – October 2014
The Amazing Spider-Man Vol. 3 #7-8, Superior Spider-Man, Vol. 1 #32-33, Free Comic Book Day: Amazing Spider-Man (2014).
3	Spider-Verse	Dan Slott/Olivier Coipel/Giuseppe Camuncoli	November 2014 – February 2015
The Amazing Spider-Man Vol. 3 #9-15.
4	Graveyard Shift	Dan Slott/Christos Gage/Humberto Ramos	March 2015 – May 2015
The Amazing Spider-Man Vol. 3 #16-18, Annual #40.
N/A	Spiral	Gerry Conway/Carlo Barberi	March 2015 – August 2015
The Amazing Spider-Man Vol. 3 #16.1-20.1.

=== Amazing Spider-Man: Worldwide (October 2015 – June 2018) ===
Volume #	Title	Author / Illustrator	Time Period
1	Worldwide, Vol. 1	Dan Slott/Giuseppe Camuncoli	October 2015 – December 2015
The Amazing Spider-Man Vol. 4 #1-5.
N/A	Amazing Grace	Jose Molina/Simone Bianchi	December 2015 – July 2016
The Amazing Spider-Man Vol. 4 #1.1-1.6.
2	Worldwide, Vol. 2	Dan Slott/Matteo Buffagni/Giuseppe Camuncoli	December 2015 – April 2016
The Amazing Spider-Man Vol. 4 #6-11.
3	Worldwide, Vol. 3	Dan Slott/Giuseppe Camuncoli	May 2016 – July 2016
The Amazing Spider-Man Vol. 4 #12-15, Annual #19.
4	Worldwide, Vol. 4	Dan Slott/Giuseppe Camuncoli/R.B. Silva	August 2016 – October 2016
The Amazing Spider-Man Vol. 4 #16-19.
5	Worldwide, Vol. 5	Dan Slott/Christos Gage/Giuseppe Camuncoli	October 2016 – February 2017
The Amazing Spider-Man Vol. 4 #20-24, Annual #1.
6	Worldwide, Vol. 6	Dan Slott/Stuart Immonen	March 2017 – June 2017
The Amazing Spider-Man Vol. 4 #25-28.
7	Worldwide, Vol. 7	Dan Slott/Christos Gage/Stuart Immonen	June 2017 – November 2017
The Amazing Spider-Man Vol. 4 #29-32, Vol. 1 #789-791.
8	Worldwide, Vol. 8	Dan Slott/Christos Gage/Mike Hawthorne/Stuart Immonen	January 2018 – February 2018
The Amazing Spider-Man Vol. 1 #794-796, Annual #42.
9	Worldwide, Vol. 9	Dan Slott/Stuart Immonen	March 2018 – June 2018
The Amazing Spider-Man Vol. 1 #797-801.

=== Amazing Spider-Man by Nick Spencer (July 2018 – September 2021) ===
Volume #	Title	Author / Illustrator	Time Period
1	Back to Basics	Nick Spencer/Ryan Ottley	July 2018 – September 2018
Free Comic Book Day: Amazing Spider-Man (2018), The Amazing Spider-Man Vol. 5 #1-5.
2	Friends and Foes	Nick Spencer/Humberto Ramos	September 2018 – November 2018
The Amazing Spider-Man Vol. 5 #6-10.
3	Lifetime Achievement	Nick Spencer/Ryan Ottley/Chris Bachalo	December 2018 – February 2019
The Amazing Spider-Man Vol. 5 #11-15.
4	Hunted	Nick Spencer/Humberto Ramos/Gerardo Sandoval	February 2019 – June 2019
The Amazing Spider-Man Vol. 5 #16-23, 16.HU, 18.HU-20.HU.
5	Behind the Scenes	Nick Spencer/Ryan Ottley/Kev Walker	June 2019 – August 2019
The Amazing Spider-Man Vol. 5 #24-28.
6	Absolute Carnage	Nick Spencer/Ryan Ottley/Francesco Manna	September 2019 – October 2019
The Amazing Spider-Man Vol. 5 #29-31, Red Goblin: Red Death #1.
7	2099	Nick Spencer/Patrick Gleason/Oscar Bazaldua	October 2019 – December 2019
The Amazing Spider-Man Vol. 5 #32-36.
8	Threats & Menaces	Nick Spencer/Ryan Ottley/Iban Coello	January 2020 – May 2020
The Amazing Spider-Man Vol. 5 #37-43.
9	Sins Rising	Nick Spencer/Marcelo Ferreira/Mark Bagley/Kim Jacinto/Guillermo Sanna	July 2020 – August 2020
The Amazing Spider-Man Vol. 5 #44-47, Amazing Spider-Man: Sins Rising Prelude #1.
10	Green Goblin Returns	Nick Spencer/Mark Bagley/Ryan Ottley/Humberto Ramos/Federico Vicentini	September 2020 – October 2020
The Amazing Spider-Man Vol. 5 #48-49, Amazing Spider-Man: The Sins of Norman Osborn #1, Free Comic Book Day: Spider-Man/Venom (2020).
11	Last Remains	Nick Spencer/Patrick Gleason/Mark Bagley	October 2020 – December 2020
The Amazing Spider-Man Vol. 5 #50-55.
N/A	Last Remains Companion	Nick Spencer/Matthew Rosenburg/Federico Vicentini/Takeshi Miyazawa	October 2020 – December 2020
The Amazing Spider-Man Vol. 5 #50.LR-54.LR.
12	Shattered Web	Nick Spencer/Mark Bagley/Marcelo Ferreira	January 2021 – February 2021
The Amazing Spider-Man Vol. 5 #56-60.
13	King's Ransom	Nick Spencer/Federico Vicentini/Patrick Gleason/Mark Bagley	March 2021 – May 2021
The Amazing Spider-Man Vol. 5 #61-66, Giant Size Amazing Spider-Man: King's Ransom #1.
14	Chameleon Conspiracy	Nick Spencer/Marcelo Ferreira/Carlos Gómez	June 2021
The Amazing Spider-Man Vol. 5 #67-69, Giant Size Amazing Spider-Man: Chameleon Conspiracy #1.
N/A	Sinister War	Nick Spencer/Mark Bagley	July 2021 – September 2021
Sinister War #1-4.
15	What Cost, Victory	Nick Spencer/Federico Vicentini/Patrick Gleason/Mark Bagley/Marcelo Ferreira	July 2021 – September 2021
The Amazing Spider-Man Vol. 5 #70-74.

=== Spider-Man: Beyond (October 2021 – March 2022) ===
Volume #	Title	Author / Illustrator	Time Period
1	Amazing Spider-Man: Beyond Vol. 1	Zeb Wells/Patrick Gleason, Kelly Thompson/Sara Pichelli, Cody Ziglar/Michael Dowling	October 2021 – November 2021
The Amazing Spider-Man Vol. 5 #75-80, 78.BEY, 80.BEY.
2	Amazing Spider-Man: Beyond Vol. 2	Saladin Ahmed/Cody Ziglar/Patrick Gleason/Carlos Gómez/Jorge Fornéz/Paco Medina	December 2021 – January 2022
The Amazing Spider-Man Vol. 5 #81-85.
3	Amazing Spider-Man: Beyond Vol. 3	Zeb Wells/Jed MacKay/Michael Dowling/Carlos Gómez	January 2022 – February 2022
The Amazing Spider-Man Vol. 5 #86-88, 88.BEY, Mary Jane & Black Cat: Beyond #1.
4	Amazing Spider-Man: Beyond Vol. 4	Patrick Gleason/Kelly Thompson/Zeb Wells/Mark Bagley/Sara Pichelli	February 2022 – March 2022
The Amazing Spider-Man Vol. 5 #89-93 and 92.BEY.

=== Amazing Spider-Man by Zeb Wells (April 2022 – October 2024) ===
Volume #	Title	Author / Illustrator	Time Period
1	World Without Love	Zeb Wells/John Romita, Jr.	April 2022 – July 2022
The Amazing Spider-Man Vol. 6 #1-5.
2	The New Sinister	Zeb Wells/Ed McGuinness/John Romita, Jr.	July 2022 – August 2022
The Amazing Spider-Man Vol. 6 #6-8.
3	Hobgoblin	Zeb Wells/Patrick Gleason/Nick Dragotta/John Romita, Jr./Michael Dowling	September 2022 – November 2022
The Amazing Spider-Man Vol. 6 #9-14.
4	Dark Web	Zeb Wells/Ed McGuinness	December 2022 – February 2022
The Amazing Spider-Man Vol. 6 #15-18, Dark Web #1, Dark Web: Finale #1.
5	Dead Language, Part 1	Zeb Wells/John Romita, Jr.	February 2023 – April 2023
The Amazing Spider-Man Vol. 6 #19-23.
6	Dead Language, Part 2	Zeb Wells/Erica Schultz/John Romita, Jr./Julian Shaw/Patrick Gleason	April 2023 – May 2023
The Amazing Spider-Man Vol. 6 #24-26, Annual #1, Fallen Friend #1, Free Comic Book Day (2023): Spider-Man/Venom.
7	Armed and Dangerous	Zeb Wells/Ed McGuinness/John Romita, Jr./Emilio Laiso/Zé Carlos	June 2023 – August 2023
The Amazing Spider-Man Vol. 6 #27-31.
8	Spider-Man's First Hunt	Zeb Wells/Patrick Gleason/Ed McGuinness/Emilio Laiso	August 2023 – November 2023
The Amazing Spider-Man Vol. 6 #32-38.
9	Gang War	Zeb Wells/Cody Ziglar/John Romita, Jr./Joey Vazquez/Julian Shaw	November 2023 – February 2024
The Amazing Spider-Man Vol. 6 #39-44, Amazing Spider-Man Gang War: First Strike #1.
10	Breathe	Zeb Wells/Carmen Carnero/Todd Nauck/John Romita, Jr.	March 2024 – May 2024
The Amazing Spider-Man Vol. 6 #45-49, Web of Spider-Man Vol. 3 #1, Free Comic Book Day (2024): Ultimate Universe/Spider-Man.
11	Going Green	Zeb Wells/Ed McGuinness/Todd Nauck	May 2024 – July 2024
The Amazing Spider-Man Vol. 6 #50-54.
12	Dead Wrong	Zeb Wells/Emilio Laiso/John Romita, Jr.	August 2024 – October 2024
The Amazing Spider-Man Vol. 6 #55-60.

=== Amazing Spider-Man by Joe Kelly (November 2024 – present) ===
Note: * = Not released yet

Volume #	Title	Author / Illustrator	Time Period
N/A	Amazing Spider-Man: The 8 Deaths of Spider-Man	Various	November 2024 – March 2025
The Amazing Spider-Man Vol. 6 #61-70.
1	Get Back Up	Joe Kelly/Pepe Larraz	April 2025 – June 2025
The Amazing Spider-Man Vol. 6 #70, Vol. 7 #1-5, Free Comic Book Day 2025 (Amazing Spider-Man/Ultimate Universe)
2	Through The Gates Of Hell	Joe Kelly/John Romita, Jr./Michael Dowling	June 2025 – August 2025
The Amazing Spider-Man Vol. 7 #6-10
3	Resolute*	Joe Kelly/John Romita, Jr./Todd Nauck/Ed McGuinness	September 2025 – February 2026
The Amazing Spider-Man Vol. 7 #11, 12, 14, 16, 18, 20-21, Annual #1
4	Broken*	Joe Kelly/Pepe Larraz/Emilio Laiso/Nick Bradshaw	September 2025 – February 2026
The Amazing Spider-Man Vol. 7 #11, 13, 15, 17, 19, 22
N/A	Amazing Spider-Man/Venom: Death Spiral*	Joe Kelly/Al Ewing/Jesús Saiz/Ed McGuinness/Carlos Gómez	March 2026 – May 2026
Amazing Spider-Man/Venom: Death Spiral #1, The Amazing Spider-Man Vol. 7 #23-27, Venom #255-257, Amazing Spider-Man/Venom: Death Spiral - Body Count #1, Free Comic Book Day 2025 (Amazing Spider-Man/Ultimate Universe)

== Marvel Masterworks: The Amazing Spider-Man ==
Volume #	Contents	Creative Team
1	Amazing Fantasy #15, The Amazing Spider-Man Vol. 1 #1-10	Stan Lee/Steve Ditko
2	The Amazing Spider-Man Vol. 1 #11-19, Annual #1	Stan Lee/Steve Ditko
3	The Amazing Spider-Man Vol. 1 #20-30, Annual #2	Stan Lee/Steve Ditko
4	The Amazing Spider-Man Vol. 1 #31-40	Stan Lee/Steve Ditko/John Romita Sr.
5	The Amazing Spider-Man Vol. 1 #41-50, Annual #3	Stan Lee/John Romita Sr.
6	The Amazing Spider-Man Vol. 1 #51-61, Annual #4	Stan Lee/John Romita Sr.
7	The Amazing Spider-Man Vol. 1 #62-67, Annual #5, Spectacular Spider-Man #1-2	Stan Lee/John Romita Sr.
8	The Amazing Spider-Man Vol. 1 #68-77, Marvel Super-Heroes #14	Stan Lee/John Romita Sr.
9	The Amazing Spider-Man Vol. 1 #78-87	Stan Lee/John Romita Sr.
10	The Amazing Spider-Man Vol. 1 #88-99	Stan Lee/John Romita Sr./Gil Kane
11	The Amazing Spider-Man Vol. 1 #100-109	Stan Lee/Roy Thomas/Gil Kane/John Romita Sr.
12	The Amazing Spider-Man Vol. 1 #110-120	Stan Lee/Gerry Conway/John Romita Sr.
13	The Amazing Spider-Man Vol. 1 #121-131	Gerry Conway/Gil Kane/Ross Andru
14	The Amazing Spider-Man Vol. 1 #132-142, Giant-Size Super-Heroes #1, Marvel Treasury Edition #1	Gerry Conway/Ross Andru
15	The Amazing Spider-Man Vol. 1 #143-155, Marvel Special Edition #1	Gerry Conway/Len Wein/Ross Andru
16	The Amazing Spider-Man Vol. 1 #156-168, Annual #10	Len Wein/Ross Andru
17	The Amazing Spider-Man Vol. 1 #169-180, Annual #11, Nova #12, Marvel Treasury Edition #14	Len Wein/Ross Andru
18	The Amazing Spider-Man Vol. 1 #181-193, Annual #12, Mighty Marvel Comics Calendar #1978	Marv Wolfman/Ross Andru/Keith Pollard
19	The Amazing Spider-Man Vol. 1 #193-202, Annual #13, Peter Parker, the Spectacular Spider-Man Annual #1	Marv Wolfman/Keith Pollard
20	The Amazing Spider-Man Vol. 1 #203-212, Annual #14	Denny O'Neil/John Romita, Jr.
21	The Amazing Spider-Man Vol. 1 #213-223, Annual #15	Denny O'Neil/John Romita, Jr.
22	The Amazing Spider-Man Vol. 1 #224-237, Annual #16, The Marvel Comics Guide to Collecting Comics, Official Handbook of the Marvel Universe	Roger Stern/John Romita, Jr.
23	The Amazing Spider-Man Vol. 1 #238-251, Annual #17, Peter Parker, the Spectacular Spider-Man #85, The Official Marvel Try-Out Book	Roger Stern/John Romita, Jr.
24	The Amazing Spider-Man Vol. 1 #252-262, Annual #18	Tom DeFalco/Ron Frenz
25	The Amazing Spider-Man Vol. 1 #263-270, Annual #19, Web of Spider-Man #1, 6, The Official Marvel Index to the Amazing Spider-Man #1-9	Tom DeFalco/Ron Frenz
26	The Amazing Spider-Man Vol. 1 #271-278, Peter Parker, the Spectacular Spider-Man #111, Marvel Graphic Novel #22, Marvel Fanfare #27	Tom DeFalco/Ron Frenz
27	The Amazing Spider-Man Vol. 1 #279-288, Annual #20, Marvel Tales Vol. 2 #198	Tom DeFalco/Christopher Priest/Ron Frenz/Alan Kupperberg

== The Amazing Spider-Man Epic Collections ==
=== Traditional Epic Collections ===
Volume #	Title	Creative Team
1	Great Power	Stan Lee/Steve Ditko
Amazing Fantasy #15, The Amazing Spider-Man Vol. 1 #1-17, Annual #1
2	Great Responsibility	Stan Lee/Steve Ditko
The Amazing Spider-Man Vol. 1 #18-38, Annual #2
3	Spider-Man No More	Stan Lee/John Romita Sr.
The Amazing Spider-Man Vol. 1 #39-52, Annual #3-4, Not Brand Echh #2
4	The Goblin Lives	Stan Lee/John Romita Sr.
The Amazing Spider-Man Vol. 1 #53-67, The Spectacular Spider-Man #1-2, Marvel Super-Heroes #14, Not Brand Echh #6, 11
5	The Secret Of The Petrified Tablet	Stan Lee/John Romita Sr./John Buscema
The Amazing Spider-Man Vol. 1 #68-85, Annual #5-6
6	The Death Of Captain Stacy	Stan Lee/John Romita Sr./Gil Kane/Roy Thomas
The Amazing Spider-Man Vol. 1 #86-104, Annual #7-8
7	The Goblin's Last Stand	Stan Lee/Gerry Conway/John Romita Sr./Gil Kane
The Amazing Spider-Man Vol. 1 #105-123
8	Man-Wolf At Midnight	Gerry Conway/Ross Andru
The Amazing Spider-Man Vol. 1 #124-142, Giant-Size Super-Heroes #1, Marvel Treasury Edition #1
9	Spider-Man Or Spider-Clone	Gerry Conway/Len Wein/Ross Andru
The Amazing Spider-Man Vol. 1 #143-164, Annual #10, Marvel Treasury Edition #1
10	Big Apple Battleground	Len Wein/Marv Wolfman/Ross Andru
The Amazing Spider-Man Vol. 1 #165-185, Annual #11-12, Nova #12, Marvel Calendar 1978, Marvel Special Edition Treasury #14, FOOM #17-18, 22
11	Nine Lives Has The Black Cat	Marv Wolfman/Keith Pollard/John Byrne
The Amazing Spider-Man Vol. 1 #186-206, Annual #13, Peter Parker, The Spectacular Spider-Man Annual #1
12	Spider-Man: Threat Or Menace?	Denny O'Neil/John Romita, Jr./Frank Miller
The Amazing Spider-Man Vol. 1 #207-223, Annual #14-15
13	Nothing Can Stop The Juggernaut	Roger Stern/John Romita, Jr.
The Amazing Spider-Man Vol. 1 #224-241, Annual #16
14	TBA	
Not created yet, but will include The Amazing Spider-Man Vol. 1 #242-258
15	Ghosts Of The Past	Tom DeFalco/Ron Frenz
The Amazing Spider-Man Vol. 1 #259-272, Annual #18-19, Web of Spider-Man #1, 6
16	TBA	
Not created yet, but will include The Amazing Spider-Man Vol. 1 #273-288
17	Kraven's Last Hunt	J.M. DeMatteis/Mike Zeck
The Amazing Spider-Man Vol. 1 #289-294, Annual #20-21, Spider-Man vs. Wolverine #1, Web of Spider-Man #31-32, Peter Parker, the Spectacular Spider-Man #131-132, Annual #7
18	Venom	David Michelinie/Todd McFarlane
The Amazing Spider-Man Vol. 1 #295-310, Annual #22, Peter Parker, the Spectacular Spider-Man #133, Web of Spider-Man #33
19	Assassin Nation	David Michelinie/Todd McFarlane
The Amazing Spider-Man Vol. 1 #311-325, Annual #23, The Amazing Spider-Man: Parallel Lives
20	Cosmic Adventures	David Michelinie/Erik Larsen
The Amazing Spider-Man Vol. 1 #326-333, Annual #24, The Spectacular Spider-Man #158-160, Annual #10, Web of Spider-Man #59-61, Annual #6
21	The Return Of The Sinister Six	David Michelinie/Erik Larsen
The Amazing Spider-Man Vol. 1 #334-350, Spider-Man: Spirits of the Earth
22	Round Robin	Al Milgrom/Mark Bagley
The Amazing Spider-Man Vol. 1 #351-360, Annual #25, The Spectacular Spider-Man Annual #11, Web of Spider-Man #59-61, Annual #7
23	The Hero Killers	David Michelinie/J.M. DeMatteis/Mark Bagley/Scott McDaniel/Mike Zeck
The Amazing Spider-Man Vol. 1 #361-367, Annual #26, Amazing Spider-Man: Soul of the Hunter #1, The Spectacular Spider-Man Annual #12, Web of Spider-Man Annual #7, New Warriors Annual #2
24	Invasion Of The Spider-Slayers	Roy Thomas/David Michelinie/Michael Bair/Mark Bagley/Jeff Johnson
The Amazing Spider-Man Vol. 1 #368-377, Annual #27, Spider-Man/Dr. Strange: The Way to Dusty Death, Spider-Man Special Edition: The Trial of Venom
25	Maximum Carnage	Tom DeFalco/Ron Lim, Terry Kavanagh/Alex Saviuk, David Michelinie/Mark Bagley, J.M. DeMatteis/Sal Buscema, Tom Lyle
The Amazing Spider-Man Vol. 1 #378-380, Web of Spider-Man #101-103, Spider-Man #35-37, The Spectacular Spider-Man #201-203, Spider-Man/Punisher/Sabretooth: Designer Genes, Spider-Man: Unlimited #1-2
26	Lifetheft	David Michelinie/J.M. DeMatteis/Mark Bagley/Steven Butler
The Amazing Spider-Man Vol. 1 #381-393, Annual #28, Spider-Man #45, The Spectacular Spider-Man #211, Web of Spider-Man #112, The Amazing Spider-Man Ashcan Edition #1
27	The Clone Saga	Various
The Amazing Spider-Man Vol. 1 #394-396, The Spectacular Spider-Man #217-219, Web of Spider-Man #117-119, Spider-Man #51-53, Spider-Man: Unlimited #7
28	Web of Life, Web of Death	Various
The Amazing Spider-Man Vol. 1 #397-399, The Spectacular Spider-Man #220-222, Web of Spider-Man #120-123, Spider-Man #54-56, Spider-Man: Unlimited #8, Spider-Man: Funeral for an Octopus #1-3, Spider-Man: The Clone Journal
29	The Mark of Kaine	Various
The Amazing Spider-Man Vol. 1 #400-403, The Spectacular Spider-Man #223-226, Web of Spider-Man #124-126, Spider-Man #57-60, Spider-Man: Unlimited #9
30+	TBA	
Not created yet, but will include The Amazing Spider-Man Vol. 1 #404-441 and Vol. 2 #1-29

=== Modern Era Epic Collections ===
Volume #	Title	Creative Team
1	Coming Home	J. Michael Straczynski/John Romita, Jr.
The Amazing Spider-Man Vol. 2 #30-45
2	The Life And Death Of Spiders	J. Michael Straczynski/John Romita, Jr.
The Amazing Spider-Man Vol. 2 #46-58, 500-502
3	Sins Past	J. Michael Straczynski/Fiona Avery/John Romita, Jr./Mike Deodato, Jr./Mark Brooks
The Amazing Spider-Man Vol. 2 #503-518, 509 Director's Cut
4-13	TBA	
Not created yet, but will include The Amazing Spider-Man Vol. 2 #519-647
14	Big Time	Dan Slott/Fred Van Lente/Christos Gage/Humberto Ramos/Stefano Caselli/Marcos Martin
The Amazing Spider-Man Vol. 2 #648-662, 654.1
15	Spider-Island	Dan Slott/Fred Van Lente/Christos Gage/Humberto Ramos/Giuseppe Camuncoli/Stefano Caselli/Ryan Stegman
The Amazing Spider-Man Vol. 2 #663-676, Amazing Spider-Man: Infested #1, Free Comic Book Day (2011): Spider-Man, Spider-Man: Deadly Foes #1

== Mighty Marvel Masterworks: The Amazing Spider-Man ==
Volume #	Title	Creative Team
1	With Great Power...	Stan Lee/Steve Ditko
Amazing Fantasy #15, The Amazing Spider-Man Vol. 1 #1-10
2	The Sinister Six	Stan Lee/Steve Ditko
The Amazing Spider-Man Vol. 1 #11-19, Annual #1
3	The Goblin and the Gangsters	Stan Lee/Steve Ditko
The Amazing Spider-Man Vol. 1 #20-28, Annual #2
4	The Master Planner	Stan Lee/Steve Ditko
The Amazing Spider-Man Vol. 1 #29-38
5	To Become an Avenger	Stan Lee/John Romita, Sr.
The Amazing Spider-Man Vol. 1 #39-46, Annual #3

== The Amazing Spider-Man Omnibuses ==
Title	Creative Team	Time Period
The Amazing Spider-Man Omnibus Vol. 1	Stan Lee/Steve Ditko	June 1962 – May 1966
Amazing Fantasy #15, The Amazing Spider-Man Vol. 1 #1-38, Annual #1-2, Fantastic Four Annual #1, and Strange Tales Annual #2
The Amazing Spider-Man Omnibus Vol. 2	Stan Lee/John Romita Sr.	June 1966 – October 1968
The Amazing Spider-Man Vol. 1 #39-67, Annual #3-5, The Spectacular Spider-Man #1-2
The Amazing Spider-Man Omnibus Vol. 3	Stan Lee/John Romita Sr./John Buscema/Gil Kane	November 1968 – November 1971
The Amazing Spider-Man Vol. 1 #68-104, Annual #6-8 (covers only)
The Amazing Spider-Man Omnibus Vol. 4	Stan Lee/Gerry Conway/John Romita Sr./Gil Kane/Ross Andru	December 1971 – January 1975
The Amazing Spider-Man Vol. 1 #105-142, Giant-Sized Superheroes #1, Marvel Super-Heroes #14
The Amazing Spider-Man Omnibus Vol. 5	Gerry Conway/Len Wein/Ross Andru	February 1975 – March 1978
The Amazing Spider-Man Vol. 1 #143-180, Annual #10-11, Nova #12, Marvel Treasury Edition #14, Marvel Special Edition #1
The Amazing Spider-Man Omnibus Vol. 6	Marv Wolfman/Ross Andru/Keith Pollard	April 1978 – April 1980
The Amazing Spider-Man Vol. 1 #181-205, Annual #12-13, Spectacular Spider-Man Annual #1
The Amazing Spider-Man Omnibus Vol. 7	Denny O'Neil/John Romita, Jr./Frank Miller	May 1980 – October 1981
The Amazing Spider-Man Vol. 1 #206-223, Annual #14-15, Marvel Treasury Edition #15, What If (comics) #23-24, 30
Spider-Man by Roger Stern Omnibus	Roger Stern/John Romita, Jr./Marie Severin/Jim Mooney	April 1980 – March 1984
The Amazing Spider-Man Vol. 1 #206, 224–252, Annual #16-17, Peter Parker: The Spectacular Spider-Man #43-61, 85
The Amazing Spider-Man by David Michelinie and Todd McFarlane Omnibus	David Michelinie/Todd McFarlane	November 1987 – December 1989
The Amazing Spider-Man Vol. 1 #296-329, Spectacular Spider-Man Annual #10
Spider-Man by David Michelinie and Erik Larsen Omnibus	David Michelinie/Erik Larsen	December 1989 – June 1991
The Amazing Spider-Man Vol. 1 #287, 324, 327, 329–350, Spider-Man #15, 18–23, The Amazing Spider-Man Vol. 2 #19-21, Marvel Comics Presents #48-50
Spider-Man by Michelinie and Bagley Omnibus Vol. 1	David Michelinie/Mark Bagley	July 1991 – January 1993
The Amazing Spider-Man Vol. 1 #351–375, Annual #25-26, Spectacular Spider-Man Annual #11-12, Web of Spider-Man Annual #7-8, New Warriors Annual #2
Spider-Man: Clone Saga Omnibus Vol. 1	Various	August 1994 – March 1995
Web of Spider-Man #117-125, The Amazing Spider-Man Vol. 1 #394-401, Spider-Man #51-58, Spectacular Spider-Man #217-224, Spider-Man Unlimited #7-9
Spider-Man: Clone Saga Omnibus Vol. 2	Various	April 1995 – August 1995
Web of Spider-Man #126-129 and Super Special, The Amazing Spider-Man Vol. 1 #402-406 and Super Special, Spider-Man #59-63 and Super Special, Spectacular Spider-Man #225-229 and Super Special, Venom Super Special, New Warriors #61-66, Spider-Man: The Jackal Files, Spider-Man: Maximum Clonage Alpha and Omega, Spider-Man Unlimited #10, Spider-Man Team-Up #1, Spider-Man: The Lost Years #1-3, Spider-Man: The Parker Years
Spider-Man: Ben Reilly Omnibus Vol. 1	Various	September 1995 – February 1996
Web of Scarlet Spider #1-4, The Amazing Scarlet Spider #1-2, Scarlet Spider #1-2, Spectacular Scarlet Spider #1-2, Scarlet Spider Unlimited #1, Green Goblin #3, Sensational Spider-Man #0-3, The Amazing Spider-Man Vol. 1 #407-410, Annual ’96, Spider-Man #64-67, New Warriors #67, Spectacular Spider-Man #230-233, Spider-Man/Punisher: Family Plot #1-2, Spider-Man Holiday Special 1995, Spider-Man: The Final Adventure #1-4, Spider-Man Unlimited #11, Spider-Man Team-Up #2-3, Venom: Along Came A Spider #1-4
Spider-Man: Ben Reilly Omnibus Vol. 2	Various	March 1996 – October 1996
Sensational Spider-Man #4-11, The Amazing Spider-Man Vol. 1 #411-418, Spider-Man #68-75, Spectacular Spider-Man #234-241, Spider-Man Unlimited #12-14, Spider-Man: Redemption #1-4, Daredevil #354, Spider-Man Team-Up #4-5, Spider-Man: The Osborn Journal, 101 Ways To End the Clone Saga, Dead Man's Hand
Amazing Spider-Man by J. Michael Straczynski Omnibus Vol. 1	J. Michael Straczynski/John Romita, Jr./Mike Deodato, Jr.	April 2001 – November 2004
The Amazing Spider-Man Vol. 2 #30-58, The Amazing Spider-Man Vol. 1 #500-514
Amazing Spider-Man by J. Michael Straczynski Omnibus Vol. 2	J. Michael Straczynski/Mike Deodato, Jr./Ron Garney	December 2004 – December 2007
The Amazing Spider-Man Vol. 1 #515-545, Friendly Neighborhood Spider-Man #1-4, 24, Marvel Knights: Spider-Man #19-22, Sensational Spider-Man #41, Spider-Man: The Other Sketchbook #1, Spider-Man: One More Day Sketchbook #1
Spider-Man: Brand New Day Omnibus Vol. 1	Various	January 2008 – January 2009
The Amazing Spider-Man Vol. 1 #546-583, Annual #35, Free Comic Book Day (2007): Spider-Man, Secret Invasion: Amazing Spider-Man #1-3, Spider-Man: Fear Itself One-Shot, Amazing Spider-Man: Extra #1-2, Spider-Man: Swing Shift Director's Cut One Shot
Spider-Man: Brand New Day Omnibus Vol. 2	Various	January 2009 – November 2009
The Amazing Spider-Man Vol. 1 #584-611, Annual #36, Amazing Spider-Man: Extra! #1, 3, The Short Halloween One-Shot, Spider-Man: A Chemical Romance Digital Comic #1, Spider-Man: The Root of All Annoyance Digital Comic #1, Dark Reign: Mr. Negative #1-3, Amazing Spider-Man Presents: Anti-Venom - New Ways to Live #1-3, Amazing Spider-Man Presents: Jackpot #1-3; Amazing Spider-Man Family #6-7, Web of Spider-Man Vol. 2 #1
Spider-Man: Brand New Day Omnibus Vol. 3	Various	November 2009 – November 2010
The Amazing Spider-Man Vol. 1 #612-647, Annual #37, Dark Reign: The List - Amazing Spider-Man, Amazing Spider-Man Presents: Black Cat #1-4, The Many Loves of the Amazing Spider-Man #1, Web of Spider-Man #2-7, 12, Spider-Man: Origin of the Hunter #1, Spider-Man: Grim Hunt - The Kraven Saga
Superior Spider-Man Omnibus Vol. 1	Dan Slott/Christos Gage/Ryan Stegman/Giuseppe Camuncoli/Humberto Ramos	January 2013 – April 2014
The Amazing Spider-Man Vol. 1 #698-700, Superior Spider-Man Vol. 1 #1-31, Annual #1-2
Amazing Spider-Man by Nick Spencer Omnibus Vol. 1	Nick Spencer/Ryan Ottley/Humberto Ramos	July 2018 – May 2020
The Amazing Spider-Man Vol. 5 #1-43, 16.HU, 18.HU-20.HU, Amazing Spider-Man: Full Circle, Free Comic Book Day 2018 (Amazing Spider-Man/Guardians of the Galaxy)
Amazing Spider-Man by Nick Spencer Omnibus Vol. 2	Nick Spencer/Ed Brisson/Matthew Rosenburg/Mark Bagley/Patrick Gleason/Marcelo Ferreira/Federico Vicentini	July 2020 – September 2021
The Amazing Spider-Man Vol. 5 #44-74, 50.LR-54.LR, Amazing Spider-Man: Sins Rising Prelude, Amazing Spider-Man: The Sins of Norman Osborn, Giant Size Amazing Spider-Man: Kings Ransom, Giant Size Amazing Spider-Man: The Chameleon Conspiracy, Sinister War #1-4
Amazing Spider-Man: Beyond Omnibus	Various	October 2021 – March 2022
The Amazing Spider-Man Vol. 5 #75-93, 78.BEY, 80.BEY, 88.BEY, 92.BEY, Mary Jane & Black Cat: Beyond #1, Free Comic Book Day 2021 (Spider-Man/Venom)
Amazing Spider-Man by Zeb Wells Omnibus Vol. 1	Zeb Wells/Ed McGuinness/John Romita, Jr.	April 2022 – May 2023
The Amazing Spider-Man Vol. 6 #1-26, Annual #1, Dark Web #1, Dark Web Finale #1, Free Comic Book Day 2022 (Spider-Man/Venom), Fallen Friend #1
Amazing Spider-Man by Zeb Wells Omnibus Vol. 2	Zeb Wells/Ed McGuinness/Patrick Gleason/John Romita, Jr.	June 2023 – October 2024
The Amazing Spider-Man Vol. 6 #27-60, Free Comic Book Day 2023 (Spider-Man/Venom), Amazing Spider-Man: Gang War First Strike, Free Comic Book Day 2024 (Ultimate Universe/Spider-Man), Web of Spider-Man Vol. 3 #1

== Other issues ==
- The Amazing Spider-Man Super Special #-1 (June 1995) – Story 1: "The Far Cry!" – Story 2: "Street Fear" – Story 3: "Ghosts",– (David Michelinie/Dave Hoover) Part of the Planet of the Symbiotes storyline.
- The Amazing Spider-Man – Free Comic Book Day #1 (June 2007; released May 5, 2007; officially titled as Free Comic Book Day 2007: Spider-Man #1 in the comic's legal indicia) – "Swing Shift" – Dan Slott/Phil Jimenez – First appearance of Overdrive, Mister Negative, Jackpot, Vin Gonzales. First (unofficial) appearance of the "Brand New Day" storyline (this story was later reprinted with new material as The Amazing Spider-Man: Swing Shift (Director's Cut) in 2008).
- The Amazing Spider-Man: Extra! #1 (one-shot issue; September 2008; released July 30, 2008) – Story 1: "Death of a Wise Guy" (Joe Kelly/Chris Bachalo) – Hammerhead is operated on by Mister Negative (backstory for The Amazing Spider-Man #575). – Story 2: "Birthday Boy" (Zeb Wells/Patrick Olliffe) – Spider-Man battles the Trapster and attends Harry's birthday party. – Story 3: "The Spartacus Gambit. Character Assassination: Interlude" (Marc Guggenheim/Marcos Martin) – Spider-Man is in police custody and, with Matt Murdock as his lawyer, is dealing with criminal charges on multiple counts of assault, murder, and obstruction of justice and with a civil suit (part of the "Character Assassination" storyline starting in The Amazing Spider-Man #582).
- The Amazing Spider-Man: Extra! #2 (one-shot issue; March 2009; released January 28, 2009) – Story 1: "Anti-Venom Returns" (Dan Slott/Chris Bachalo) – Story 2: "A Night with Wolverine" (Zeb Wells/Paolo Rivera)
- The Amazing Spider-Man: Extra! #3 (one-shot issue; May 2009; released March 18, 2009)
- Free Comic Book Day Vol. 2018 Amazing Spider-Man (May 2018) – (Nick Spencer/Ryan Ottley) "Amazing Spider-Man" leads into the events of the 2018 series.
- Free Comic Book Day Vol. 2021 Spider-Man/Venom (August 2021) – (Zeb Wells/Patrick Gleason) Leads into Spider-Man: Beyond.

== See also ==
- List of Spider-Man titles
