= List of Spider-Man supporting characters =

This is a list of characters who serve as supporting cast of the Marvel Comics' Spider-Man.

== Family ==
=== Immediate family ===
- Richard Parker - Father. Died in an airplane crash.
- Mary Parker - Mother. Died in an airplane crash.
- Teresa Parker - Peter Parker's long lost sister who is introduced in the graphic novel Spider-Man: Family Business. She later appeared in the comics.
- Ben Parker - Peter Parker's uncle. Shot by the Burglar.
- May Parker - Peter Parker's loving aunt who raises him after his parents died. After the murder of her husband Ben, May is virtually his only family, and they are very close.
- Mary Jane Watson (love interest, later wife) - Introduced to Peter by his Aunt May, who is friends with her Aunt Anna, Mary Jane eventually becomes Peter's best friend and wife. Their marriage was erased from history in One More Day.
- Mayday Parker - Daughter from MC2 universe- Earth-982.
- Benjy Parker - Son from MC2 universe- Earth-982.
- Will Fitzpatrick - Mary Parker's father and Peter Parker's grandfather.
- J. Jonah Jameson - He became Peter's stepcousin after his father married Aunt May.
- John Jameson - He became Peter's stepcousin once-removed after his grandfather married Aunt May.

=== Clones ===
- Ben Reilly - Peter Parker's clone brother who was known as Scarlet Spider and the second Spider-Man. Unlike most of the clones, Peter views Ben as his brother and considers him family.
- Kaine Parker - Peter Parker's clone brother who was the second Scarlet Spider.
- Web-Man - A twin duplicate of Spider-Man.
- Spidercide - A Peter Parker clone who has control over his own molecules who was used by the Jackal as muscle. Died fighting Ben Reilly and Peter Parker above the Daily Bugle before falling to its death.
- Jack - A Peter Parker clone who was the Jackal's diminutive henchman, armed with claw-like fingernails (much like Guardian). He dies from clone degeneration.
- Guardian - A Peter Parker clone with dense skin, super-strength, and claw-like fingernails who guarded the entrance to one of the Jackal's headquarters. He also died of clone degeneration.
- Skeleton of a Spider-Man clone - Found in a smokestack
- Doppelganger - A mystical duplicate created by Magus.
- Elliot Tolliver - A proto-clone with mind of Doctor Octopus in a clone body of Peter Parker and of Otto Octavius.
- Spider-Man (Isotope Genome Accelerator version) - A duplicate separated from Peter Parker by the Isotope Genome Accelerator.
- Ultimate Carnage - Related in the Ultimate universe Earth-1610.
- Ultimate Spider-Woman - A clone of Peter Parker that is also known as Spider-Woman, Black Widow, Ultimate Spider-Woman, Ultimate Black Widow in the Ultimate universe Earth-1610.

=== Mary Jane's family ===
- Anna Watson - Mary Jane's aunt and Aunt May's best friend.
- Madeline Watson - Mother, deceased
- Philip Watson - Father
- Kristy Watson - Cousin
- Gayle Watson-Byrnes - Sister

=== May Parker's family ===
- Albert Reilly (father)
- Claire Reilly (mother)
- Horace Reilly (uncle)
- Bill Reilly (uncle)
- Claudia Reilly (aunt): Bill Reilly's wife
- Sam Reilly (cousin): Bill and Claudia's son
- Julia Reilly (cousin): Bill and Claudia's daughter (married last name unrevealed)
- Jan Reilly (sister)
- April Reilly (sister)
- Alexa (niece): Julia Reilly's daughter and Peter Parker's cousin, last name unrevealed
- Ames (niece): Peter Parker's cousin, last name unrevealed
- Amanda (niece): Peter Parker's cousin, last name unrevealed
- J. Jonah Jameson Sr.: Second husband, father of J. Jonah Jameson, and stepuncle of Peter.

== Spider-Man Family ==
Spider-Man family tree

Will Fitzpatrick
George Stacy	Mary Parker (née Fitzpatrick)	Richard Parker	Benjamin Parker	May Parker (née Reilly)	John Jonah Jameson Sr.	David Burnoll	Betty Burnoll
Emily Lyman	Norman Osborn; Green Goblin of Earth-616 (Note: In the temporary continuity of House of M only.)	Gwendolyne Maxine Stacy	Peter Parker; Spider-Man	Mary Jane Watson; Spinneret (Note: In the continuity of Amazing Spider-Man: Renew Your Vows only.)	Teresa Parker	Joan Jameson	John Jonah Jameson Jr.	Marla Madison
John Jonah Jameson III; Colonel Jupiter / Man-Wolf / Stargod	Linda Brown	Gloria Morales
Gabriel Stacy and Sarah Stacy	Richard "Richie" Parker	Benjamin Richard "Benjy" Parker (Note: In the continuity of the MC2 (Marvel Comics 2) imprint only.) (Note: An older Benjamin Parker additionally appears in J. J. Abrams' Spider-Man as an only child.)	May "Mayday" Parker; Spider-Girl	Anna-May "Annie" Parker; Spiderling	Aaron Davis; The Prowler / Iron Spider	Jefferson Davis; Agent of S.H.I.E.L.D. Scorpion	Rio Morales
Liz Allan; Firebird	Harold Theopolis "Harry" Lyman (né Osborn); Green Goblin / Kindred	Kaine Parker; Tarantula / Scarlet Spider (Note: A clone of Peter Parker created by Miles Warren.)	Janine Godbe; Elizabeth Tyne	Ben Reilly; Scarlet Spider / Spider-Man / Jackal	Gwen Stacy of Earth-65; Spider-Woman / Spider-Gwen / Ghost-Spider	Miles Morales; Spider-Man / Captain Universe	Wilhelmina "Billie" Mariana Morales
Normie Osborn; Green Goblin / Red Goblin / Goblin Childe	María Aracely Josefina Penalba de las Heras; Hummingbird	Reilly Tyne; Darkdevil	Ultimate Spider-Woman; Jessica Drew / Peter Parker / Julia Carpenter / Black Widow (Note: In the continuity of the Ultimate Marvel imprint only.)	Charlotte; Morales-Stacy; Spider-Girl (Note: In the continuity of Spider-Man/Spider-Gwen: Sitting in a Tree only.)	Maximilian "Max"; Morales-Stacy; Spider-Boy

== Love interests ==
=== Peter Parker's love interests ===
- Anna Maria Marconi: A girlfriend of Peter when he was possessed by Doctor Octopus. Anna Maria met Peter as a student at Empire State University. The two hit it off and started dating. They started living together, and the relationship got so serious that Anna Maria found an engagement ring hidden in their apartment. After Peter regained control of himself, Anna became his friend.
- Betty Brant: Betty takes over her mother's former position as Daily Bugle secretary after she dies. Peter dates Betty Brant for a while, but they break up due to her blaming Spider-Man for the death of her brother. However, she realizes later that she was wrong and forgives him. She later marries Daily Bugle reporter Ned Leeds, although she briefly gets back with Peter after the breakdown of her marriage. Despite this, both Betty and Peter maintain a close friendship.
- Black Cat (Felicia Hardy): Peter's first superhuman girlfriend. She is calculating, strong and sly. Despite her love for Spider-Man, Felicia had trouble accepting the Peter Parker side of Spider-Man and felt he should only be the latter which complicated their relationship, though over time would accept the Peter Parker side but still prefer Spider-Man. On top of all this their relationship would remain complicated as Felicia could not fully let go of her criminal ways much to Peter's dismay. Felicia competed against Mary Jane for Peter's affections, eventually losing after she left town for a while. She also dated Flash Thompson. She would continue on as an occasional love interest of Peter in some continuities.
- Black Widow (Natasha Romanova): During a Hydra attempt to take over S.H.I.E.L.D., she is tortured to such an extent that she regresses back to an old cover identity of schoolteacher Nancy Rushman, but she is recovered by Spider-Man in time to help Nick Fury and Shang-Chi work out what had happened and restore her memory, with "Nancy" developing an attraction to Spider-Man before her memory is restored during the final fight against Madam Viper, Boomerang and the Silver Samurai. In the comic book series, Symbiote Spider-Man: Alien Reality, where Spider-Man is transported to a warped reality by poisoning from Kraven the Hunter, he meets an alternate version of Romanoff who is instead of Black Widow, the Black Cat of the reality (named "Red Cat") and claims to be his lover much to Peter's shock and confusion, he then runs away from her telling her not to follow him. She later assists Spider-Man and a dream version of Doctor Strange, who is a drifter fight Hobgoblin and Baron Mordo who have taken over the reality and Strange's place as Sorcerer Supreme only to have been revealed to be in league with the villains. She then escapes during the final battle between Spider-Man, Strange, Hobgoblin and Mordo.
- Captain Marvel (Carol Danvers): Carol Danvers, originally the superhero Ms. Marvel and later Captain Marvel, has worked with Spider-Man on occasion and even agreed to go on a date with him in accordance with his helping her on a mission, despite how angry he can make her. She later fulfills her promise. Spider-Man had admitted to himself he finds her attractive in her outfit. At the end of the near disastrous date, the two bonded together over a love of junk food. After she was possessed by the symbiote for a time, Venom hints to Spider-Man that his feelings for Ms. Marvel are mutual. The two have remained good friends. Later Danvers' successor to the Ms. Marvel mantle, Kamala Khan while on a mission with Spider-Man tells him that she ships them.
- Carlie Cooper: She is an officer of the NYPD's Crime Scene Unit and ex-best friend of Harry Osborn's ex-girlfriend, Lily Hollister. She had also been friends with Gwen Stacy. At Harry Osborn's goodbye party Peter asks her to be his girlfriend and the two share their first kiss. However they break up after Spider Island due to surmising that Peter was Spider-Man, and was angry that he'd lied to her. Carlie eventually left New York for her own safety.
- Debra Whitman: A fellow Empire State University student and secretary whom Peter dates for a period of time, though his frequent disappearances complicate their relationship. She is eventually diagnosed with mild schizophrenia, ironically exacerbated by her "delusional" belief that Peter is Spider-Man. With Peter's help, she overcomes that idea. Soon afterward, she leaves New York after another man, Biff Rifkin, confesses his strong feelings for her.
- Gwen Stacy: Gwen was Peter's first serious girlfriend. She was very kind but slightly spoiled, smart, beautiful and shared Peter's love for science. Her father was police Captain George Stacy. Peter initially ignored her due to his concern for his sick Aunt May, which frustrated Gwen. First a friendship, then a romance gradually formed between the two, which lasted for over a year, until her death. She was killed by the Green Goblin when he threw her off a bridge. In House of M, Gwen is still alive and married to Peter and have a son named Ritchie.
- Jessica Jones: Jones went to Midtown with Peter and had a secret crush on him over ninth and tenth grade, she was even present when he was bitten by the radioactive spider that gave him his powers and tried to talk to him, but ended up running away after a failed attempt, as he ran off feeling dizzy due to the spider-bite. She soon got into an accident herself that killed her family and received superpowers and was later inspired to use her powers for good after witnessing a fight between Spider-Man and Sandman. She soon became a friend of Peter's when he joined the New Avengers. She tried to remind Peter of her crush on him back in high school, to the jealousy of her husband Luke Cage only for him to have trouble remembering her let alone her name recognising her only by what others called her in school, "Coma Girl" as she fell into a coma following the accident, much to her disappointment. In Spider-Man: Life Story set in an alternate universe where the characters age naturally, Jones works with and briefly dates Peter after he divorces from Mary Jane.
- Julia Carpenter: They flirted with one another. She made his black costume (the non-symbiote version).
- Liz Allan: Peter's high school crush, although they never get together. Liz instead marries Peter's friend, Harry Osborn, who's divorced now.
- Marrow: A brainwashed Marrow is convinced she is an Empire State University student named Sarah Rushman. She develops a crush on her lecturer, Peter Parker, and the two go on a couple of dates before she realizes who she is.
- Mary Jane Watson: Initially set up by Aunt May as a blind date, Mary Jane was formerly depicted as Gwen Stacy's competition by creators. She eventually became Peter's main love interest. Both formed a bond, got closer, deeply fell in love, had an on-off relationship for years and eventually married. They sold their marriage to Mephisto who altered reality. Despite that, they maintain a close relationship.
- Michele Gonzales: A criminal defense lawyer and the hot-tempered sister of Peter's roommate Vin Gonzales, as well his temporary roommate while Vin serves time for his involvement in the Spider-Tracer Killings frame-up (to which she got him a plea bargain). When Michele attempts to kick Peter out (who is actually the Chameleon in disguise) she is instead seduced by him and become infatuated with him. She is almost constantly angry, and questioning her or drawing attention to the size of her buttocks really sets her off. However, she is also a helpful and kind person, by trying hard to help her clients get their lives back on track. After pestering and bothering Peter tirelessly, she returned to her previous home in Chicago shortly after Vin's release.
- Mockingbird (Bobbi Morse): As part of the All-New, All-Different Marvel, Bobbi is S.H.I.E.L.D.'s liaison with Parker Industries. She and Peter build a relationship slowly, with he providing her a new costume and working together to defeat Norman Osborn in Symkaria. After Peter shut down Parker Industries to stop Hydra from using his company for their own devices, she learns of his secret identity and allows him to stay at her apartment. After having stopping crime together to help Peter's self-esteem, they share a kiss. Peter lives in her apartment while recovering from the dismantling of Parker Industries. They end their relationship after realizing that outside of work and crime fighting, they do not have anything in common.
- Silk (Cindy Moon): In the "Original Sin" storyline when Spider-Man was exposed to the energies of the Watcher's eye, he recalled the first time the spider that bit him, but not before the radioactive spider that bit him managed to bite another before it died, Cindy Moon. Cindy shows remarkable abilities that are quicker and faster than Peter's. She felt a primal connection to Peter as they show an attraction to one another, and that bond was seen in a more tender, caring way throughout the Spider-Verse series. However, Cindy seems determined to keep Peter at a distance, as though attempting to come to terms with her own identity without the input of her famous ally.
- Silver Sable (Silver Sablinova): She has worked with Spider-Man on occasion. She shared a passionate moment with him when they stopped a bomb from exploding in New York City and greatly aided him during the Ends of the Earth.

=== Other continuity ===
- Emma Frost: In Marvel Adventures Spider-Man, Emma reveals that she has a crush on Peter and tries to separate Chat and Spidey by erasing Chat's memory. On her own, she decides to pay for her crimes and get arrested, but returns to help Spidey, apparently, still holding a crush on Peter.
- Kitty Pryde: In the Ultimate Marvel Universe, Kitty Pryde of the X-Men had a crush on Spider-Man and would eventually become his girlfriend, though this did not last after they landed in a compromising situation during a mission with the X-Men that threatened to expose Parker's secret identity and Kitty's status as a public superhero, somewhat straining their relationship and the Clone Saga, Peter realized he still loves Mary Jane. Kitty, who began dating Peter's friend Kenny Kong however still held strong feelings for him.
- Rogue: In X-Men Forever continuity, Spider-Man helped Rogue when she was annoyed with events happening around herself, her new powers and the X-Men's status. Rogue somewhat takes Spider-Man's advice to follow her heart and, now that she can touch people, almost kisses him.
- Sophia "Chat" Sanduval: A mutant known as Chat from the Marvel Adventures Spider-Man who first appeared in issue 53 and is best friends with this version's Emma Frost. She has the power to talk to animals. She is one of the few people who knows Spider-Man's identity and has developed deep feelings for him. She and Peter begin dating, meanwhile Emma (with her own crush on Peter) shakes their relationship. Eventually, Chat becomes Peter's girlfriend.

=== Miles Morales' love interests ===
- Barbara Rodriguez: After Miles had been integrated into the mainstream Marvel Universe (Earth-616) following 2015's Secret Wars storyline, Miles began seeing his classmate Rodriguez whom he calls "his first serious girlfriend" and who is unaware of his secret identity. The two broke up due to Miles' activities as Spider-Man forcing him to repeatedly cancel dates.
- Katie Bishop: In the Ultimate Marvel universe, one year following the death of his mother, Rio, Miles began seeing Bishop and planned to tell her that he was Spider-Man until he learned that she and her family were Hydra sleeper agents, upon which he broke up with her on the spot and on being rescued by Dagger.
- Ms. Marvel (Kamala Khan): Miles joined the Avengers along with Ms. Marvel and later formed the Champions with her. Miles harbored unrequited feelings for Ms. Marvel and even wrote online fan fiction of the two of them. Miles eventually grew out of his crush but still considers Kamala to be one of his best friends.
- Spider-Woman/Ghost-Spider: Miles and Gwen often flirt with each other whenever they work together. On Earth-8 alternate versions of Miles and Gwen are married to each other and have two children, Max and Charlotte Morales, who inherit their parents' Spider powers.
- Starling (Tiana Toomes): During one of his outings, Miles encountered Starling, the granddaughter of the Vulture. The two began working together and eventfully entered into romantic relationship after discovering each other's secret identities.

=== Other continuity ===
- Hailey Cooper: In Insomniac's Spider-Man series, Miles befriends Hailey Cooper, a deaf street artist who discovers his identity as Spider-Man at the end of Spider-Man: Miles Morales. In Spider-Man 2, Hailey becomes classmates and later Miles' girlfriend.

=== Ben Reilly's love interests ===
- Janine Godbe, The one great love of Ben's life. Ben found out Janine was living under an assumed name after she murdered the father who molested her. Ben confided in Janine that he was a clone of Spider-Man. Later Kaine forced Janine to fake her death to hurt Ben. Janine later turned herself into the police for killing her father. During the "Dark Web" storyline, Madelyne Pryor used S'ym's finger to transform Janine into Hallow's Eve, who can use special masks to assume the powers and abilities of what they represent. In the MC2 universe, Darkdevil is Ben and Janine's son.
- Jessica Carradine is the daughter of the burglar who killed Peter Parker's uncle Ben. She dated Ben during the period where he was Spider-Man and thought he was the real Peter Parker. Jessica is a photographer and discovers Ben is Spider-Man.
- Firestar: Ben and Firestar had an attraction towards each other, but it was never acted upon. Firestar earlier also shared a reciprocated attraction with Peter Parker.

Ben had Peter's memories of dating Betty Brant and Gwen Stacy, though not Mary Jane. This is due to the fact that Peter had not yet developed feelings for Mary Jane, at the time he was cloned.

== Peter Parker's supporting characters ==
=== Other ===
- Ashley Kafka: A psychiatrist at Ravencroft Institute for the criminally insane.
- Dexter Bennett: Jameson's rival at the Daily.
- Flash Thompson: Peter's former high school bully and later best friend.
- Giachomo "Jimmy-6" Fortunato: Son of the crime lord Don Fortunato, who disapproved of his family's deadly methods.
- Harry Osborn: Peter's best friend, the son of Norman Osborn, the father of Normie Osborn and Stanley Osborn, and the second incarnation of Green Goblin.
- Jean DeWolff: A police captain and good friend of Spider-Man. She eventually dies in the line of duty.
- Yuri Watanabe: Another police captain who becomes one of Spider-Man's closest friends of NYPD. She eventually becomes the vigilante Wraith.
- Leo Zelinsky: Spider-Man's costume designer. He also designs the costumes for the Avengers and the X-Men.
- Randy Robertson: Joe Robertson's son.
- Sally Avril: One of Peter's first crushes and ex-girlfriend of Flash Thompson.
- Sha Shan Nguyen: Former lover of Flash Thompson; written out of stories between Amazing Spider-Man issues 280 and 622 due to the anachronistic nature of the character's origins. She eventually became a physical therapist.
- Vin Gonzales: An NYPD officer and Michele Gonzales' brother.
- Joseph "Crusher" Hogan: A wrestler who was defeated by Peter in the ring after Peter first discovered and began testing out his new spider powers. Despite his loss, he has come to remember Spider-Man very fondly.

=== Daily Bugle ===
- J. Jonah Jameson: Peter Parker's boss at the Daily Bugle and its publisher. He has a campaign to discredit Spider-Man.
- Betty Brant: J. Jonah Jameson's former secretary. Later becomes a reporter for the Daily Bugle.
- Glory Grant: Former neighbor and friend of Peter Parker. Later becomes J. Jonah Jameson's secretary.
- Joe "Robbie" Robertson: A high-ranking editor at the Daily Bugle and a close friend and confidant of publisher J. Jonah Jameson, acting as a voice of reason in Jameson's campaign to discredit Spider-Man.
- Norah Winters: A reporter for the Daily Bugle.
- Ben Urich: A chain-smoking, tough-as-nails investigative journalist for the Daily Bugle.
- Nick Katzenberg: An amoral, foul-minded photographer who acts as a foil and sometimes adversary to Peter Parker for years. He later contracts cancer and in The Spectacular Spider-Man #216 the Daily Bugle staff are informed that he died from his illness.
- Ned Leeds: A reporter, and romantic rival for the affections of Betty Brant.

=== Horizon Labs ===
- Bella Fishbach: Bella is a co-worker of Peter Parker at Horizon Labs. Bella is part of the Lucky Seven. She is specialized in green-technology. She now works at Parker Industries.
- Grady Scraps: Grady is the comical co-worker of Peter Parker. He is, just like Peter, a member of the Lucky Seven think-tank at Horizon Labs. He now works for Parker Industries where he is part of its established Horizon University.
- Max Modell: Peter's boss in Horizon Labs after Marla Jameson recommended Max to hire him. After Horizon Labs is destroyed, he went on to work for Parker Industries where he oversees Horizon University.
- Sajani Jaffrey: Sajani, creator of an artificial Vibranium called Reverbium, works with Peter Parker at Horizon Labs, where she is a member of the Lucky Seven. She later works for Parker Industries.
- Uatu Jackson: Uatu is a pre-teen genius who works in Horizon Labs and is a member of the Lucky Seven.

=== Parker Industries ===
- Anna Maria Marconi: A researcher with dwarfism.
- Cardiac: A physician and surgeon, and the owner and administrator of a biological research firm. Elias Wirtham is driven by his brother's death to research life-saving medical practices. He serves as an ally and occasional adversary of Spider-Man.
- Living Brain: A robot was created by the fictional International Computing Machines Corporation and billed as the most intelligent computer and robot in existence, capable of solving virtually any question asked of it.
- Max Modell: Modell and his partner Hector Baez were brought in by Peter Parker to run Parker Industries west coast operations, specifically running Horizon University.

=== Ben Reilly's supporting characters ===
- Gabrielle Greer: A young woman who lived at the same hotel as Ben, when he first returned to New York City.
- Shirley Lewis (née Washington): Owner of the Daily Grind and Ben's boss.
- Desiree Winthrop: A model and regular at the Daily Grind.
- Buzz: A regular at the Daily Grind (his real name was never stated). On a few occasions he helped Ben (not realizing he's Spider-Man), through useful advice.
- Devon Lewis: Son of Shirley and part-time employee at the Daily Grind. At first Devon was distrustful of Ben, but over the months that followed he warmed up to him.

=== Kaine's supporting characters ===
- Aracely: A 16-year-old Mexican girl, whom Kaine saved from human traffickers and took in, upon his arrival in Houston. It's later revealed that Aracely possesses psychic abilities, similar to Madame Web. Her full name is María Aracely Josefina Penalba de las Heras, and adopted the codename "Hummingbird"
- Annabelle Adams: A bartender/singer at the Four Seasons Kaine lives at. Annabelle is Mexican, which prompted Kaine to ask her for help with Aracely (who couldn't speak English). Kaine later attends a concert Annabelle's band holds.
- Donald Meland: A Houston doctor whom Kaine meets when he brings in the half-dead Aracely to the hospital.
- Wallence "Wally" Layton: A Houston police officer, who encouraged Kaine to continue as a vigilante in Houston. Wally is gay and married to Donald Meland.

=== Gwen Stacy's family ===
- George Stacy (deceased): Gwen Stacy's father, Police Captain. Introduced in The Amazing Spider-Man (vol. 1) #56 (1968). He approves of Peter and Gwen's relationship as boyfriend and girlfriend. During a fight between Spider-Man and Doctor Octopus, he is crushed by falling debris while saving a child.
- Helen Stacy: Gwen's mother and wife of George. Her first and only appearance is Peter Parker: Spider-Man #-1 (minus one).
- Arthur Stacy: Gwen Stacy's uncle, a private investigator, first appeared in The Amazing Spider-Man #93 and #95. He was reintroduced only in the 1990s, in Peter Parker: Spider-Man #70 (in the last part of 'Clone Saga'). He is George's younger brother, but was originally presented in the 1970s as the older brother. For a time, Spider-Man would call on Stacy's skills as an investigator.
- Nancy Stacy: Gwen's aunt. Wife of Arthur and mother of Jill and Paul. First appeared in The Amazing Spider-Man #93.
- Jill Stacy: Arthur Stacy's daughter and Gwen's cousin. Friend of Mary Jane and Peter. After Mary Jane was kidnapped, and thought to be dead, Jill made romantic advances toward Peter. Introduced in Peter Parker: Spider-Man #76 (1997).
- Paul Stacy: Arthur Stacy's son and Gwen's cousin. He blames Spider-Man for Gwen's death and joins the anti-mutant group the Friends of Humanity in an attempt to bring him to justice. Introduced in The Amazing Spider-Man #422.

== Allies ==
=== Spider family ===
- Ezekiel Sims
- Madame Web
  - Cassandra Webb
  - Julia Carpenter
- Scarlet Spider
  - Ben Reilly
  - Kaine Parker
- Silk (Cindy Moon)
- Spider-Boy
- Spider-Girl (Anya Corazon)
- Spider-Man
  - Spider-Man 2099
  - Miles Morales
  - Otto Octavius a.k.a. Superior Spider-Man
- Spider-Woman
  - Jessica Drew
  - Mattie Franklin
- Spider-Army/Web Warriors
  - Spider-Bitch
  - Spider-Girl (Mayday Parker)
  - Spider-Ham
  - Spider-Man (Insomniac Games version)
  - Spider-Man (Pavitr Prabhakar)
  - Spider-Man (Marvel Mangaverse)
  - Spider-Man J
  - Spider-Man Noir
  - Spider-Man (Takuya Yamashiro)
  - Spider-Punk
  - Spider-Woman (Gwen Stacy)
  - Spider-Woman (Ultimate version)
  - Spider-UK
  - Peni Parker
  - Spider-Man of Earth-1048
- Symbiote
  - Agent Venom
  - Anti-Venom
  - Hybrid
  - Mania
  - Scorn
  - Sleeper
  - Toxin
  - Venom

== Other allies ==
- Alpha
- The Avengers
  - Ant-Man (Hank Pym / Scott Lang)
  - Captain America
  - Carol Danvers / Captain Marvel
  - Falcon
  - Hawkeye
  - Hercules
  - Hulk
  - Iron Man
  - Noh-Varr
  - Red Hulk
  - Scarlet Witch
  - Thor
  - Thor (Jane Foster)
  - Vision
  - Wasp (Janet van Dyne / Nadia van Dyne)
  - Wolverine
- Astonishing Avengers
- Black Cat
- Black Widow (Natasha Romanova)
- Blade
- Boomerang
- Captain Universe
- Cardiac
- Cloak and Dagger
- Colleen Wing
- Curt Connors
- Daredevil
- Darkhawk
- Deadpool
- Deathlok
- Devil Dinosaur
- Elektra
- Ethan Edwards
- Fantastic Four / Future Foundation
  - Human Torch (Johnny Storm)
  - Invisible Woman (Susan Storm)
  - Mister Fantastic (Reed Richards)
  - The Thing (Ben Grimm)
  - Franklin Richards
  - Valeria Richards
- Frog-Man
- Ghost Rider
  - Johnny Blaze
  - Danny Ketch
  - Robbie Reyes
- Gibbon (Martin Blank)
- Guardians of the Galaxy
  - Star-Lord
  - Gamora
  - Rocket Raccoon
  - Drax the Destroyer
  - Groot
  - Mantis
- Gwenpool
- Howard the Duck
- Jackpot
- Jean Grey School for Higher Learning Special Class
- Ka-Zar
- Kraven the Hunter
- Living Brain
- Man-Thing
- Mighty Avengers
  - Blue Marvel
  - Kaluu
  - Power Man
  - Spectrum
  - She-Hulk
  - White Tiger (Ava Ayala)
- Misty Knight
- Moon-Boy
- Moon Girl
- Ms. Marvel (Kamala Khan)
- Moon Knight
- El Muerto
- Namor
- New Avengers
  - Doctor Strange
  - Echo
  - Iron Fist
  - Jessica Jones
  - Luke Cage
  - Ms. Marvel
  - Mockingbird
  - Ronin
  - Sentry
  - Winter Soldier
  - Victoria Hand
- Nightwatch
- Nova
- Wild Pack/Outlaws
  - Molten Man
  - Paladin
  - Prowler
  - Puma
  - Rocket Racer
  - Sandman
  - Will o' the Wisp (formerly)
- Power Pack
- Punisher
- Razorback
- Red Sonja
- Runaways
- S.H.O.C.
- Shang-Chi
- Silver Sable
- Silver Surfer
- Slingers
  - Dusk
  - Hornet
  - Prodigy
  - Ricochet
- Songbird
- Solo
- Speedball
- Squirrel Girl
- Steel Spider
- Tigra
- Uncanny Avengers
  - Doctor Voodoo
  - Quicksilver
  - Synapse
- Werewolf by Night
- White Tiger (Angela del Toro)
- White Tiger (Hector Ayala)
- Wraith
- X-Men
  - Cyclops
  - Dazzler
  - Firestar
  - Hope Summers
  - Iceman
  - Jean Grey
  - Jubilee
  - Marrow
  - Storm
  - Wolverine
  - X-Man
  - X-23

== Alternative continuities ==
=== 2099 ===
Earth-928 a.k.a. Earth-616 circa 2099

=== Exiles ===
Omniverse (No Main Universe or Multiverse)

=== House of M ===
Earth-58163

=== Marvel Mangaverse ===
Earth-2301

=== Marvel Zombies ===
Earth-2149

=== MC2 ===
Earth-982

=== Spider-Man: India ===
Earth-50101

=== Ultimate Marvel ===
Earth-1610

=== Spider-Man Unlimited ===
Earth-7831

=== Marvel's Spider-Man ===
Earth-1048

=== Marvel Cinematic Universe ===
Earth-199999

== Supporting characters in other media ==
These supporting characters do not appear in the comics. They were created for various media series. Among them are:

- Anthony "Henry" Harper (appeared in The Amazing Spider-Man, voiced by David Lodge): Nothing much is known about District Attorney Henry Harper's past. In one side-mission in the game, he is kidnapped by the supervillain Iguana and is dragged into the sewers through the train docking station. After saving a civilian, Spider-Man learns that Harper was a pawn for Oscorp. After Spider-Man defeats Iguana, Harper is rescued and he escapes out of the sewers. Sometime before the events of the game, Harper had focused on exposing Quest Aerospace's evil schemes after he successfully prosecuted some of the city's most notorious criminals. The corrupt corporation lost millions of dollars to Harper, but they fired back when they had evidence of funds contributed to the D.A.'s reelection campaign were sourced by Oscorp Industries. These allegations were never revealed, but Harper's reputation was severely damaged in the eyes of many citizens. He is not seen in The Amazing Spider-Man 2, but he is mentioned when Spider-Man tells the Shocker that he could get into protective custody in exchange for telling Harper about the gang war.
- Dr. Watts (appeared in Spider-Man 2: Enter Electro voiced by Jennifer Hale): Dr. Watts (first name unknown) is a prominent scientist. She is the creator of the Bio-Nexus Device and a world-renowned scholar of biology. In the game, she is kidnapped by Hammerhead while attending the Science Industry Ball. During Spider-Man's fight with Hammerhead, Dr. Watts disappears, which led Spider-Man to believe that the Sandman took her. Due to an anonymous tip, Spider-Man tracks Dr. Watts to a museum, where she is taken hostage by Electro. After Electro leaves the museum, Dr. Watts tells Spider-Man that Electro went to the Twin Towers.
- Detective Terri Lee (appeared in Spider-Man voiced by Dawnn Lewis): She is a detective for the New York Police Department. Naturally, she investigates cases that involve Spider-Man and to an extent to Peter Parker, though she never found out Peter and Spider-Man are the same person. She didn't trust Spider-Man at first, but overtime she began accepting Spider-Man as an ally. She has ties to Carnage and she had a relationship with the vampire hunter Blade.
- Indira "Indy" Daimonji (appeared in Spider-Man: The New Animated Series voiced by Angella Brooks): She is Peter Parker's potential love interest and a rival of Mary Jane Watson. She works at a news network down in Manhattan. She is seriously injured by Spider-Man in the series finale when Spider-Man is tricked by the Gaines Twins into injuring Indy. This led to Peter giving up being Spider-Man
- Whitney Chang (appeared in The Amazing Spider-Man and The Amazing Spider-Man 2, voiced by Claudia Black in the first video game and by Sumalee Montano in the second video game): She is a top investigative reporter for the Channel 3 News Network and is well known for putting herself at risk for finding out the truth. She met Spider-Man in person while she was investigating a secret Oscorp facility involving cross-species genetics and its connection with Alistair Smythe, with Spider-Man tracking down a crate with Dr. Connor's research to create the cure. Whitney gave Spider-Man her camera and asks him to take photos exposing Oscorp's research. As explained in her bio, Chang grew up in the Sunset Park region of Brooklyn, New York, where she witnessed a neighbor being murdered by an angry mob after being framed for murder and being slandered by the news for days. After graduating from Yale, she quits her job as the host of a music video channel and snuck aboard a flight to Iraq, arriving just as American troops invade Baghdad. In The Amazing Spider-Man 2, through unspecified circumstances, Whitney leaves her job at the Channel 9 News Network and now works at the Daily Bugle. She works with Daily Bugle newcomer Peter Parker to expose Wilson Fisk as the Kingpin. Her role in Amazing Spider-Man 2 is lessened compared to its predecessor.
- Michelle Jones (appeared in the Marvel Cinematic Universe): More commonly known as MJ, is an original character portrayed by Zendaya in the films Spider-Man: Homecoming (2017), Spider-Man: Far From Home (2019), and Spider-Man: No Way Home (2021). She is initially introduced as a seemingly snarky classmate of Peter Parker in Homecoming but eventually becomes his love interest and girlfriend in Far From Home and No Way Home.

== See also ==
- List of Spider-Man enemies in other media
