= Anna Maria Marconi =

Fictional Marvel character

- Anna Maria Marconi in her debut appearance in Superior Spider-Man #5. Art by Giuseppe Camuncoli.

Publication information
- Publisher: Marvel Comics
- First appearance: The Superior Spider-Man #5 (May 2013)
- Created by: Dan Slott (writer); Giuseppe Camuncoli (artist)

In-story information
- Team affiliations: Parker Industries
- Supporting character of: Spider-Man; Doctor Octopus
- Abilities: Genius-level intellect

Anna Maria Marconi is a fictional character appearing in American comic books published by Marvel Comics. She was initially depicted as a love interest of Spider-Man, notably during the time when his body was taken over by Doctor Octopus's mind. She has since been depicted as a close friend to Peter Parker after he regains his mind.

== Publication history ==
Anna Maria Marconi first appeared in The Superior Spider-Man #5 (May 2013) and was created by Dan Slott and Giuseppe Camuncoli.

Marconi was created in part from Slott's desire to introduce a character that could cause some friction in Peter's personal life. He found this difficult to pull off as he could not find a reason why a character like Betty Brant or Aunt May could be bigoted or racist. Rather than having any one of them have such a fierce trait, he had May's opinion of Peter dating Anna Maria be that of concern:

Having Aunt May not be perfect is interesting. And when Aunt May is talking about this, it doesn't sound like a prejudice. It's a concerned grandma, wondering what her grandchildren are going to be like, and being ignorant. Aunt May did have cause to dislike the woman...Anna Maria does the worst possible thing you can do to Aunt May, which is to serve wheat cakes. She uses Aunt May's recipe and improves on them.

He also found it relieving that Peter's mind was taken over by Otto Octavius, as he felt that the character was more open-minded than Peter:

With Anna Maria, it was fun to have this character who never knew Peter. And you quickly see that the things that she likes are Otto...You look at Otto, and he really sees people for who they are inside, and everyone he has chosen to love and be with, there's something very neat about that.

== Fictional character biography ==
Anna Maria Marconi is a young woman with dwarfism who attends Empire State University. At the time when his mind was in Peter Parker's body, Doctor Octopus visits her to become a physics teacher and earn his doctorate. The two share great admiration for each other and the next day, Otto pulls a brutal prank on a group of bullies. The two set up a date together that ends with Otto saving Anna Maria from dry ice and kissing her. However, she too falls under the same worry umbrella as many of Peter's friends and family due to his frequent absences. Later, Anna Maria accepts Otto's offer to join Parker Industries and afterwards, successfully helps him earn his doctorate.

Anna Maria eventually meets Aunt May who despite her friendliness, causes some concern when she asks about her height. She later confides in Otto that she feels that their evening together was her fault because she had hurt the relationship between him and May. During the events of Goblin Nation, Anna Maria was kidnapped by Menace, who had deduced that Peter was really Otto. Norman Osborn as the Goblin King holds Anna Maria hostage to lure Otto out. However, Anna Maria is rescued by Spider-Man, who had retaken control of his body from Otto. She reveals to Peter that she had deduced that he was Spider-Man and that he planned on proposing to her, but is shocked to learn that Otto Octavius was the one she was in love with. Anna Maria meets back up with Peter at Parker Industries to help him with some of Otto's work and continues to help Peter on a platonic basis.

Anna Maria is sent to work at Parker Industries' European Division under Sajani Jaffrey. Unbeknownst to Anna Maria, Jaffrey had infused the Living Brain with the consciousness of Otto Octavius, causing the robot to act clingy around her. Otto's mind becomes more active as he grows jealous of Peter and fellow subordinate Aiden Blain's closeness to Anna Maria. Otto soon enacts his plan by getting rid of Aiden and then pretending to be faulty by attacking Peter.

In "Dead No More: The Clone Conspiracy", Anna Maria helps Peter battle Jackal, who is actually Ben Reilly. When Horizon University is attacked by Rhino and Electro, they retrieve Gwen Stacy and Kaine Parker. Anna Maria is brought into the lab and becomes uncomfortable when Doctor Octopus starts appealing toward his love interest. When Spider-Man makes it to the lab amongst the clones starting to break down, Anna Maria tells him that she has invented an inverse frequency that can fix most of the problem. Doctor Octopus fights Jackal to allow Peter and Anna Maria the time to transmit the frequency. After the frequency is broadcast, Peter and Anna check the building and see that Jackal, Doctor Octopus, and Gwen Stacy have been reduced to dust.

At the conclusion of the "Go Down Swinging" storyline, Anna Maria is present at Horizon University where a clean-slated Superior Octopus, under the alias of Elliot Tolliver, applies for a job. Anna Maria acts suspicious around him. After discovering that Elliot is Otto Octavius, she lets him leave to battle Terrax, and helps him absorb some of Terrax's cosmic powers.

== A.I. version ==
When Superior Spider-Man is sent to the year 2099, he encounters Gabriel O'Hara, the brother of Miguel O'Hara / Spider-Man 2099. To contact Miguel and return to his proper time, Gabriel and Superior Spider-Man create an A.I. named Anna, who is based on Anna Maria Marconi.

== Reception ==
Hamza Jaka, a comic book fan and disability rights advocate, praised Anna Maria Marconi's confident personality, which averted the trend of characters with disabilities solely existing to be inspirational.

== In other media ==
- Anna Maria Marconi appears in Spider-Man, voiced by Katrina Kemp. This version is an assistant chemistry teacher at Midtown High School.
- Anna Maria Marconi appears in Spider-Man Unlimited.
