= The Superior Spider-Man =

Comic book series

- Cover of The Superior Spider-Man #1 (January 2013). Art by Ryan Stegman.

Publication information
- Publisher: Marvel Comics
- Schedule: Biweekly
- Format: Limited series
- Genre: Superhero
- No. of issues: Vol. 1: 33; Vol. 2: 12; Vol. 3: 10; Octo-Girl: 10

Creative team
- Created by: Dan Slott; Ryan Stegman
- Written by: Dan Slott (Vol. 1 & Vol. 3); Christos Gage (Vol. 2); Hideyuki Furuhashi (Octo-Girl)
- Artist(s): Vol 1: Ryan Stegman; Humberto Ramos; Giuseppe Camuncoli; Vol. 2: Mike Hawthorne; Vol. 3: Mark Bagley; Octo-Girl: Betten Court

The Superior Spider-Man is the name of three separate superhero comic book series published by Marvel Comics, following Otto Octavius as he becomes Spider-Man. The first volume, which ran between January 2013 and September 2014, was written by Dan Slott, with artwork by Ryan Stegman, Humberto Ramos, and Giuseppe Camuncoli. It continues from the events of the 2012 storyline "Dying Wish", in which Peter Parker is killed off and replaced with his nemesis Otto Octavius, who swapped consciousnesses with Parker and left him to die in his decaying body to ensure his own survival. However, Octavius becomes inspired by Parker's dying wish to have a new Spider-Man protect New York City and decides to take on the mantle himself, becoming the self-proclaimed "Superior Spider-Man", subtly influenced by Parker's mind, which survives within his.

The series is a continuation of the long-running series The Amazing Spider-Man, which concluded with The Amazing Spider-Man #700. The Superior Spider-Man also crosses over into other Spider-Man titles such as Avenging Spider-Man and its superseding title, Superior Spider-Man Team-Up, in addition to other Marvel titles. The series ended with issue #31, which determined the fate of Parker's mind, and was followed up by a relaunch of The Amazing Spider-Man series, with the new volume depicting Parker regaining his body and the Spider-Man mantle. Despite The Superior Spider-Man being considered a different series from The Amazing Spider-Man, the original 33-issue run goes towards the legacy numbering of The Amazing Spider-Man, acting as issues #701–733. In December 2013, the series returned for five issues, numbered 700.1 through 700.5, with the first two written by David Morrell and drawn by Klaus Janson.

The series returned for two additional issues (#32 and #33) that fill a gap left by an earlier storyline, as well as lead into the "Spider-Verse" storyline. They were released in August 2014. In 2018, a one-shot titled The Superior Octopus was released, serving as a continuation of Otto Octavius' story after the events of "Go Down Swinging", and also serving as a tie-in to the "Spider-Geddon" storyline. The same year, a second volume of The Superior Spider-Man debuted as part of "Spider-Geddon" with 12 new issues, written by Christos Gage and drawn by Mike Hawthorne.

In June 2023, the manga series Spider-Man: Octo-Girl (written by Hideyuki Furuhashi and drawn by Betten Court) launched, serving as a direct narrative continuation of the first two volumes, and in November 2023, a standalone third volume of The Superior Spider-Man (written by Slott and drawn by Mark Bagley) began. The first volume was adapted in the second season of the animated series Marvel's Spider-Man (2017), with the character voiced by Robbie Daymond (Superior Spider-Man's body) and Scott Menville (Otto Octavius' inner thought monologues). Otto Octavius as the Superior Spider-Man has also appeared in the animated film Spider-Man: Across the Spider-Verse (2023) as a member of Spider-Man 2099's Spider-Society.

== Publication history ==
Marvel Comics first teased The Superior Spider-Man in September 2012 by releasing an image of the word Superior without the creative team. A short time before the NYCC 2012 Marvel released a new Superior teaser, this time with the creative team of Dan Slott, Ryan Stegman, Humberto Ramos and Giuseppe Camuncoli. A week later a new Spider-Man centric title was revealed to be The Superior Spider-Man. In December 2018, Otto, in his Superior Spider-Man avatar, returned once again in a series written by Christos Gage and illustrated by Mike Hawthorne. In June 2023, it was announced that a new volume of The Superior Spider-Man would launch later in 2023, which also the 10-year anniversary of the original storyline, and that Dan Slott would return to write the book. In July 2023, it was announced that a one-shot, called Superior Spider-Man Returns, would launch in October that same year, with Slott writing, and Stegman, Ramos, Camuncoli, and Mark Bagley on art, which would lead into a new ongoing launching in November that same year by Slott and Bagley. It was also revealed at San Diego Comic-Con that the series would replace the Spider-Man (2022–23) series by Slott and Bagley for eight issues then the character would continue with a spin-off/sequel series, Spider-Man: Octo-Girl, by Hideyuki Furuhashi and Betten Court. The third volume would conclude with issue 8 in June 2024, but a fourth volume was announced December 2025.

== Plot summary ==
=== Volume 1 ===
==== "My Own Worst Enemy" ====
After Peter Parker's death at the "Dying Wish" storyline's climax in The Amazing Spider-Man #700, Otto Octavius has implanted his mind into Peter's body, determined to prove himself the "Superior" Spider-Man by being both a better superhero and person than Peter ever could be. Octavius earns public acclaim when he defeats the Sinister Six. Unbeknownst to Octavius, he is subconsciously held back by Peter's consciousness, which has survived but is unable to significantly influence him. Octavius inadvertently causes himself to share Peter's genuine love for Mary Jane Watson.

When his old Sinister Six teammate Vulture resurfaces, Octavius attempts to convince Parker's old friend Harry Osborn to give up crime. Upon the discovery that the Vulture employs children as henchmen Otto brutally takes the Vulture down, blinding him in the process. Vulture's remaining henchmen are taken in by the Green Goblin. With his merciless reputation growing, Octavius focuses on increased efficiency, developing thousands of "Spider-Bots" that patrol the city for him while returning to college as Parker to complete his doctorate, in turn growing close to his tutor Anna Maria Marconi. Otto locates escaped killer Massacre, whom he then executes publicly to prevent further murders.

==== "A Troubled Mind" ====
His decision to execute Massacre sits ill with his teammates in the Avengers and they bring him in for questioning after a brutal beating of pranksters Jester and Screwball. The Avengers' tests fail to expose Octavius' mind-swap. Otto uses a brain scanner to treat a young girl's brain injury, then uses the device on himself to discover Parker's presence within his mind. A mental battle ensues between himself and Parker. Octavius defeats Parker, then seemingly eliminates Peter by erasing Peter's memories.

Police Captain Wraith questions the officers present during the Massacre killing. An autopsy reveals Massacre was unable to fire a gun and was shot point blank, confirming Yuri's suspicions. The Green Goblin hacks the Spider-Bots tech to allow his followers to bypass detection. Former Vulture henchmen torch Mary Jane's nightclub in revenge for an earlier failed attempt. Mary Jane believes Peter will come to rescue her, but is saved by local firemen. Otto becomes closer with Anna Maria Marconi. The Green Goblin declares himself the Goblin "King", as his army grows.

==== "No Escape" ====
Spider-Man is asked to supervise Alistair Smythe's execution. As the execution begins, mini Spider-Slayers allow Smythe to attempt escape. J. Jonah Jameson tells Spider-Man to ensure that Smythe dies by any means necessary. Otto predicts Smythe's every escape attempt and eventually fatally stabs Smythe. Smythe attempts to transfer his mind into Spider-Man, but Otto also planned for this possibility. Later, Spider-Man uses a recording of Jameson's kill-order to blackmail Jameson. Otto then assaults Shadowland, the domain of Kingpin and the new Hobgoblin, with his arach-naught tanks and army of Spiderling minions. Kingpin flees and frames his death with a body double. The Goblin's soldiers rejoice in the fact their boss now owns over half of New York's organized crime. Tiberius Stone sabotages the Hobgoblin, ruining him. Spider-Man publicly reveals Phil Urich as the new Hobgoblin. Phil realizes that he has nowhere to run and takes Norah Winters hostage. Spider-Man arrives at the Daily Bugle and defeats Urich. Urich is later freed by Menace and brought to the Goblin King, then given new armor and the "Goblin Knight" title.

==== "Necessary Evil" ====
In the year 2099, Miguel O'Hara is surprised by the appearance of dinosaurs and World War I biplanes. Alchemax's CEO Tyler Stone sends Spider-Man 2099 back to stop it. Otto in the present attacks Tiberius, but is stopped by Spider-Man 2099. Grady Scraps uses the Time Gate to see the day of the Alpha Incident. He returns to find them surrounded by explosive chronal energy. Otto accesses Peter's memories, to try to stop the time explosion. This causes Peter's consciousness to re-emerge. Tyler destroys his time machine in the future, stranding Spider-Man 2099. Carlie Cooper discovers that Spider-Man's funds comes from a secret account. Spider-Man heads for a date with Anna Maria only to meet the Black Cat. Spider-Man punches her and webs her for the police. Peter/Otto starts Parker Industries. At ESU, Professor Lamaze accuses Peter of (ironically) plagiarizing Otto. Angelina Brancale, Otto's former girlfriend, learns Octavius is dead after coming out of her coma. She restarts her VR power suit and becomes Stunner again. Stunner attacks the Bugle. Otto shuts down her VR interface and takes it back to his base. When she awakes, Otto appears holographically as his old self and tells her he has moved on. Lamaze drops his accusations after also being visited by Otto. Carlie and Yuri Watanabe learn Spider-Man is getting money from Otto's bank account. Carlie believes their minds have swapped, but she is kidnapped and brought to the Goblin King.

==== "Superior Venom" ====
Flash Thompson (Agent Venom) returns to New York. Flash confronts Crime Master, but Otto intervenes. Crime Master is just a common criminal who has purchased the costume from Hobgoblin. Otto then turns on Flash. Flash flees to a hospital, before going to meet Peter Parker. "Peter" invites him in. Otto gleans knowledge about Flash's relationship with Peter during the visit. Otto asks Flash to come to Parker Industries, under the guise of giving him prosthetic legs. Flash doesn't realize Otto intends to remove the Venom symbiote. At the lab, the Venom symbiote attaches itself to Otto. The Venom symbiote soon tries to flee back to Flash, but Otto gains control. Superior Venom dispatches criminality more ruthlessly than ever before. Iron Man carries Flash to confront Superior Venom. Superior Venom is ambushed by Flash in Iron Man's armor. During the mental struggle between the Venom symbiote and Otto, Peter's consciousness separates Otto from the Venom symbiote, letting it to re-bond with Flash. When the Avengers confront Spider-Man about his brutality, Otto lies by saying the Venom symbiote was in control over the past months, and then leaves the Avengers. Meanwhile, the Goblin King sprays Carlie with goblin serum and transforms her into "Monster". The Goblin King and Hobgoblin fight for control over NYC; the latter is killed, but Urich discovers that the man was a body double.

==== "Goblin Nation" ====
The Goblin King lures the Superior Spider-Man to his hideout, revealing that he knows Otto is inhabiting Spider-Man's body. He offers Octavius a truce if Otto submits to him. Otto refuses. The Goblin King attacks and destroys his Spider-Base. Otto and Living Brain barely escape. The Goblin King goes after all of Parker's associates, but Mary Jane has been prepared with an evacuation plan, rescues May Parker, and warns everybody. Only Anna Maria is kidnapped. Monster/Carlie reveals that she is partially in control and offers herself as a test subject to create a cure for the Goblin Serum. The Goblin King destroys everything Otto created/saved to build his new legacy: his childhood home, the research center where he created his arms, the "BoneYard" where all his paraphernalia is held, the soda factory where he did his first heroic act, and the HEART Clinic. To make things worse, Jameson releases an army of Spider-Slayers built by Alchemax, but they are hacked by the Goblin King. Spider-Man 2099 comes to help, but Otto abandons him to save Anna Maria. After hesitating about whether to save a young girl, Amy Chen (whom Otto had helped via brain surgery), or go after the Goblin King, Otto realizes that saving Anna Maria is beyond him, and allows Peter to take back control of his body. Parker helps O'Hara and cures Menace with the anti-Goblin serum. During his fight with the Goblin King, he loses the last serum, before removing the Goblin King's mask, revealing him to be Alchemax's associate Mason Banks. However, he confirms he is indeed Norman Osborn, having undergone plastic surgery to move undetected, allowing him to build the Goblin Nation, hijack Octavius' security network, and secretly having secured Alchemax to be inherited by his grandson Normie Osborn. Without his mask, the spider-bots recognize Osborn as a threat and administer the goblin anti-serum. He escapes and vows revenge, proclaiming that "they'll never see [him] coming". Tiberius reobtains and intends to sell the Spider-Slayers on the black market. Jameson then resigns as mayor of NYC.

==== Spider-Verse ====
During the time Superior Spider-Man was missing after the Horizon Labs explosion, he was teleported to 2099, where he used the future technology to find a way back, but instead discovers the existence of the Inheritors. He recruits the help of other "Spider-Men" to fight back. After his transportation, the Superior Spider-Man believed he was encountering a prior version of Peter Parker as Spider-Man, as opposed to a future version since he believed he had defeated Parker permanently. After the defeat of the Inheritors, Superior Spider-Man returns to his spot in the Earth-616 timeline but has no recollection of the Spider-Verse events.

=== Dead No More: Clone Conspiracy ===
It is revealed that Otto had used the technology acquired in 2099 to make a copy of his consciousness right before being sent back, and stored the copy in his gauntlets and programmed it activate in 100 days. When the gauntlets reactivated, the duplicate made an octobot body out of the gauntlets. This duplicate would initially plan to take control of Peter's body, while hiding inside the Living Brain. However, after learning that his true self had sacrificed himself and willingly gave Peter his body back, Otto (due to his massive ego and lack of his true self's final memories) believes that Peter's body corrupted his original self's personality and instead decided to get a new body modeled after his own physique, after causing the Living Brain to self-destruct. After finding out his original body has been stolen by New U Technologies and was being restored, Otto infiltrated New U's lab and transferred his consciousness into his renewed body and quickly destroyed a copy of Peter Parker's consciousness, created as a side effect of Peter inhabiting Otto's body as it died, before reclaiming his title as Dr. Octopus and making a pact with the Jackal (a resurrected Ben Reilly) to perfect New U Technologies' currently flawed cloning process. Otto succeeded in creating an improved clone with spliced DNA from him and Peter Parker, calling it the "Proto-Clone". He stands with the Jackal, until he insults a captured Anna Maria Marconi (who the original Otto had a lengthy relationship with during his occupation of Peter's body that reached the point where Otto admitted he loved her) causing Otto to turn against him, discovering he was a Spider-Clone the entire time, causing him to feel manipulated. He and the Jackal fight as their bodies began to degenerate into dust and Otto destroys Reilly's webware, which was sending a signal that would have healed their bodies, but Otto intends for him to die. As their bodies further degenerate, Reilly attempts to transfer his mind into the Proto-Clone but is instead electrocuted into unconsciousness (as a fail-safe Otto made if anybody other than him tries to transfer their conscience into the Proto-Clone), before Otto takes the body for himself and leaves Ben for dead. He then tracks down an old base of his and finds out Hydra has taken over it. After defeating various henchmen, he is offered an alliance by Armin Zola to help him take down Parker Industries (a company Otto had founded during his time in Peter's body), which Otto agreed to. After making a new suit, with a similar pattern to the Superior Spider-Man suit, Otto dubbed himself the "Superior Octopus". After fighting Spider-Man for control of Parker Industries, Otto fails and is dismayed at being a Hydra soldier. He becomes a member of Hydra's short-lived version of the Avengers, which later disbands following Hydra's defeat. Otto later defects from Hydra, deciding to resume his former self's career in heroism and bases himself in San Francisco, using the alias of "Eliot Tolliver", and gains a position at Horizon University.

=== Volume 2 ===
==== Spider-Geddon ====
Superior Octopus establishes himself as the local hero of San Francisco, where he has defeated the Night Shift, Arnim Zola, and Count Nefaria. He has a lab with his inventions, including a machine that makes clones of himself, allowing his consciousness to jump to one of those in case of death. This machine uses technology of the Inheritors. Spider-UK, Spider-Woman of Earth-982, Spider-Gwen of Earth-65, Doctor Octopus (Octavia Octo) of Earth-1104, Spider-Ham, Spider-Punk of Earth-138, and Spider-Man Noir gather at the lab to warn him of the risk. Morlun emerges from one of the machines as they talked as well as Verna and Jennix, who kill Spider-Man Noir and Spider-UK as Morlun departs to target Peter Parker.

==== Post-Spider-Geddon ====
Otto resumes his career as the Superior Spider-Man once again, protecting San Francisco with the hired assistance of the Night Shift. His identity as Dr. Elliot Toliver is uncovered by Anna Maria, who confronts him with the rebuilt Living Brain, but the appearance of Terrax gives Otto a chance to temporarily evade this. Despite lacking the weaponry, technology, and the Night Shift's assistance to take on Terrax, Otto refuses to back down despite being heavily injured during the fight against him. With help from Anna Maria and the Night Shift, Otto is able to use a device to siphon a fraction of Terrax's Power Cosmic and transfer it to himself, giving Otto cosmic powers. Despite this upgrade, Otto is still unable to defeat Terrax until he is able to change the frequency of the latter's axe and trick him into taking it back, causing a feedback which shocks Terrax unconscious. With the fight over, Otto returns the Power Cosmic back to the machine and passes out. When he awakens, he is being treated by Anna Maria who decides that she will help Otto be a real hero. She also warns Otto that if he ever returns to his Doctor Octopus persona, she will have him arrested or worse. Otto agrees to this, believing she would make the perfect partner for him.

While helping the authorities rebuild San Francisco and rescue survivors, Otto learns about humility and begins to connect with the people. Unbeknownst to him, Master Pandemonium emerges from the wreckage planning to strike. When Pandemonium attacks, Superior Spider-Man is forced to work with Doctor Strange to stop Pandemonium after he possesses Elliot Tolliver's new associate Emma Hernandez, revealing in flashbacks that the two met before they adopted their later identities, with Strange rejecting a request to help Octavius develop the original harness and Octavius later ignoring the now-destitute Strange after the accident. While fighting Master Pandemonium, the two are forced to 'swap' for a time, with Strange using Superior Spider-Man's 'spinnerets' to operate on Pandemonium and shut him down while Superior Spider-Man uses the Cloak of Levitation. At the fight's conclusion, Superior Spider-Man asks if Strange could cast the same spell that he used to make the world forget about Peter's identity. Strange rejects that request as the original spell could only be cast under specific circumstances and in any case he feels that it does Superior Spider-Man good to have people aware of his past so that he won't be tempted to "regress".

Listen big guy, I get it. Everyone's the hero of their own story.
So when you find out there are other stories where you don't
even rate a mention, it sucks. But I'll tell you something. I've
been paying attention. To the redshirts. The extras. The day
players. They're people too. Even if the powers that be don't
think of 'em that way. If, in this whole war, all you do is save
one guy... ...You are the most important person in that guy's
world. You coming?

— Gwendolyn Poole, The Superior Spider-Man, Vol. 2, Issue 8.

==== War of the Realms ====
During the War of the Realms storyline, Superior Spider-Man worked to save the civilians from a Frost Giant invasion. Then, he came up with the idea to work with the West Coast Avengers to make use of America Chavez's powers. After rescuing them with his Octavian Lens, Superior Spider-Man barely manages to convince them to help fight the Asgardian invasion at the source. They later go to New York City, since the Asgardian magic was interfering with America's powers. In the midst of the battle between the Fantastic Four and Malekith the Accursed's forces, Superior Spider-Man worked with Mister Fantastic to enable America Chavez to duplicate the Bifrost Bridge's energy. After the two of them failed to locate the strike team in Svartalfheim, Superior Spider-Man and Mister Fantastic located the strike team in Jotunheim. Those in Jotunheim (specifically Peter Parker) order Superior Spider-Man to focus on protecting Earth. After he initially refuses to leave, Gwen Poole assists Superior Spider-Man in his coming to terms with his lack of a role in the war. After that, Superior Spider-Man and the West Coast Avengers returned to Earth to continue protecting its citizens.

==== Revenge of Spider-Man of Earth-44145 ====
Once the War was over, the Superior Spider-Man received an award from the city for his role in its defence, but Superior Spider-Man found himself troubled by the ceremony, confessing to Spider-Man later that he felt as though he should have been able to save more. Offering his own experience as a hero, Spider-Man consoled Superior Spider-Man by observing that Octavius feeling this hurt over random deaths proved that he was moving on from his old villainous history. Unbeknownst to Elliot Tolliver on his date with Emma Hernandez, he is being spied upon by one of the spiders that makes up Spiders-Man on behalf of Norman Osborn of Earth-44145. After being told the information he received from Spiders-Man, Norman Osborn of Earth-44145 plans revenge on Superior Spider-Man.

The next day, Max Modell calls Elliot Tolliver to his office, where Tolliver admits that he is the Proto-Clone created by New U Technologies and is hosting Otto Octavius' mind. Modell stated that he already knew of him being the Proto-Clone and Superior Spider-Man as well as stating that he believes in second chances. Upon analyzing the security footage of the leak, Superior Spider-Man finds small spiders and figures out that Spiders-Man was responsible. Spiders-Man attacks them as Superior Spider-Man uses a Wave Disruption Field to trap the main spider. Getting a confession from him, Superior Spider-Man reveals to Modell about the Norman Osborn of Earth-44145 who operates as the Spider-Man of his reality. Spiders-Man states that Spider-Man of Earth-44145 is safe on his world and that they will never reach him. In Horizon University's sub-basement two, Superior Spider-Man states that they will not be able to power the dimensional transporter without something that can replicate the energies of the Cosmic Cube. Anna Maria and Living Brain revealed that they harnessed the cosmic energies from the fight with Terrax in the Cosmic Harness invention. When Living Brain enters the cosmic energies into the system, he starts to overload and it causes an explosion. As Superior Spider-Man holds up the rubble, Spider-Man of Earth-44145 appears revealing that he was on Earth-616 all this time thanks to the fragment of the Web of Life and Destiny that he holds that enables him to travel to different dimensions. Upon knocking down Superior Spider-Man, Spider-Man of Earth-44145 reveals that he is going to kill everyone that he cares about as part of his revenge on Superior Spider-Man for insulting him.

Rescue crews work to save those caught in the explosion. As Max Modell and Emma Hernandez are loaded onto the ambulances, Anna Maria Marconi tells Superior Spider-Man that she will go to the hospital to keep an eye on them. As he goes to look for the Night Shift members that are still loyal to him, Superior Spider-Man asks her to keep James Martin safe. After defeating Dansen Macabre, Digger, and Skein with the help of Spiders-Man, Spider-Man of Earth-44145 starts to target James as Superior Spider-Man catches up to him. Upon being subdued, Superior Spider-Man begs for mercy on James. Superior Spider-Man tells Anna Maria that he cannot call Spider-Man or the Avengers without endangering James. With no other choice, Superior Spider-Man uses a signal move he learned from Doctor Strange to call Mephisto, who states that Spider-Man of Earth-44145 is out of his jurisdiction. Superior Spider-Man asks Mephisto to restore him to the man he once was for a day so that he can fight Spider-Man of Earth-44145. While Mephisto states that he either has or does not have his soul, he does have a counter-offer that will restore his body without disease, the physical mental, and the taint of Peter Parker. As Superior Spider-Man tells Anna that there is no other option, he expects Mephisto to uphold his end of the bargain. At the Lowe Hotel, the Brothers Grimm have collected their payment from Spider-Man of Earth-44145 when they are attacked by Doctor Octopus. He demands the location of Spider-Man of Earth-44145 from them or else they will die.

As Spider-Man of Earth-44145 is keeping an eye on James Martin, Elliot Tolliver comes in with a hooded man who Spider-Man of Earth-44145 will be his first victim. He is caught by surprise when the hooded man sheds his disguise to be Doctor Octopus while Elliot Tolliver was actually a mindless clone that Doctor Octopus' Octobot was controlling as he states that it does count as an innocent life being killed. When Spider-Man of Earth-44145 tries to call for Spiders-Man, Doctor Octopus reveals that he unleashed his Octobots on him. As Spider-Man of Earth-44145 drops James, he turns on the cameras and fights Doctor Octopus who summons all his old harnesses to aid him by rescuing James and entrapping Spider-Man of Earth-44145. After injuring Spider-Man of Earth-44145, Doctor Octopus uses his fragment of the Web of Life and Destiny to send him back to Earth-44145. Afterwards, Doctor Octopus speaks through the cameras about his return stating to let what happened to Spider-Man of Earth-44145 serve as a warning to anyone who comes after him for what he has done as Superior Spider-Man who is a "disease of the mind". At the hospital, Anna Maria Marconi informs Emma Hernandez about Doctor Octopus' broadcast. Doctor Octopus visits Anna Maria and Emma stating that he no longer remembers Spider-Man's true identity, but remembers his life as Elliot Tolliver. As Anna Maria and Emma try to persuade Doctor Octopus to stay with them, but he runs off. One week later, a funeral is held for Elliot Tolliver. Doctor Octopus then walks away, leaving his Superior Spider-Man outfit in the garbage.

=== Volume 3: The Superior Spider-Man Returns and 2023 relaunch ===
It was revealed at the 2023 San Diego Comic-Con that a one-shot issue entitled Superior Spider-Man Returns would be released in October 2023 for the character's 10th anniversary. The issue is written by Christos Gage from a story by Dan Slott and features interior art by Ryan Stegman, Mark Bagley, Giuseppe Camuncoli, and Humberto Ramos, with the one-shot set to lead into a new ongoing series by Slott and Bagley. The events of the Spider-Man series, also written by Slott and drawn by Bagley, kick off the newest chapter in the series which has been teased as a "Superior Reckoning".

As Otto Octavius arrives at the sight of his infamous accident that turned him into Doctor Octopus in the first place, he works to get to the sub-levels and find what he needs to finally rid himself of his greatest enemy. As his new tentacles make quick work of the debris, he recalls the radiation exposure and beatings from Spider-Man put him in near death and how he took over Spider-Man's body. Upon coming across a dodecahedron which he has no memory of, Doctor Octopus tries to recall what it was for. In a flashback, Otto, as the Superior Spider-Man, is told by his Spider-Bots about criminal activity in the city, and focuses on taking out Slyde. Otto manages to catch up to Slyde after he falls into the river while avoiding his web barricade and leaves him webbed up for the police. However, Otto tells the cops the Tridium that Slyde had stolen was washed away in the river, when in actuality, he took it for his own purposes. Back at Horizon Labs, Otto begins works on making a miniature star with Living Brain present as they are visited by Grady Scraps. Later, at Empire State University and after speaking with Anna Maria Marconi, Estrella Lopez answers an ad to be Spider-Man's assistant. When she arrives at the abandoned Atomic Research Center, she meets up with Spider-Man and the Living Brain where they spend days working together to create a sustainable miniature sun. Otto comes up with the idea to update his suit to include four mechanical limbs and to also hire henchmen, later becoming his Spiderlings. Sometime later, Estrella is piloting a giant robot during Otto and the Spiderlings fight with A.I.M. agents led by Quintronic Man. When they get to the miniature star in A.I.M.'s possession, it begins to overload until Otto places it in a dodecahedron. In the aftermath, Estrella cracks the equation to create a sustainable miniature sun, but Otto takes the credit for her breakthrough. Later that night, Otto is dining with Anna Maria as Estrella tries to get back at Otto by taking the power source out. When she does this, it starts to cause a blackout that alerts Otto and has him return to his base. Upon entering his lab, he finds Estrella transformed into an energy being after she merged with the miniature sun, as she begins attacks him over the problem that she solved while taking on the name of Supernova. Otto manages to trick Supernova into entering the dodecahedron and seals her within. In the present, Supernova escapes her prison.

While Parker is fighting Supernova, Spider-Boy goes to Parker Labs and becomes infected by Spiders-Man's remaining spiders. Using Spider-Boy's ability to communicate with other arachnids, they spread the hive mind throughout every resident of New York City, almost like Spider-Island. Spider-Boy takes on the persona, Superior Spider-Boy. Eventually Otto and Spider-Man trap Super Nova back in a new dodecahedron trap. Otto plans to sacrifice her to create an unlimited power source, to Parker's objection. Anna Maria pretends to be possessed by the hive mind, driving Otto to regret the entire plot and uses the neurolitic brain scanner to reverse the hive mind, but also erase his recent memories, which include him being Superior Spier-Man, trapping Estrella, and being in love with Anna Marconi. Super Nova decides not to exact revenge on Otto since he doesn't remember her, so killing him would be uneventful. Spider-Man lets Otto escape since he did save the city, but as he leaves he tells Anna Maria that he has no idea who she is, but she responds, "I have a pretty good idea who you are now".

== Annuals ==
Two Superior Spider-Man annuals were published during the series' run. The first one was written by Christos Gage and drawn by Javier Rodríguez and Alvaro Lopez. It involved Spider-Man tracking down Blackout after the latter kidnapped Aunt May.

The second annual was written by Gage and drawn by Rodríguez and focused on Phil Urich's relationship with his uncle Ben Urich.

== Reception ==
Initially when it was announced that Marvel was killing off Peter Parker and that his body would be taken over by Doctor Octopus it was criticized universally by fans of the previous series. However, as the series progressed, some critics were won over by the fresh approach and its smart writing.

David Brooke expresses that Superior Spider-Man Returns, albeit being a fun return to the character, is misleading since the story is simply a flashback and not an official return of Otto Octavius as Spider-Man.

== In other media ==
=== Television ===
The Superior Spider-Man storyline is adapted in the second season of the 2017 Spider-Man animated series, with the character voiced by Robbie Daymond (Superior Spider-Man's body) and Scott Menville (Otto Octavius' inner thought monologues). In this continuity, Octavius is forced to transfer his consciousness from his body into the Living Brain before eventually reaching Spider-Man's body and trapping Peter Parker's mind inside of the Living Brain's Neuro Cortex computer. Becoming inspired by his host's memories of Ben Parker, Octavius vows to reinvent and prove himself superior. While inside Spider-Man's body, Octavius efficiently balances out crime-fighting with his regular life and befriends Midtown High assistant science teacher Anna Maria Marconi. However, his aggressive behavior raises Miles Morales' suspicions, so he calls in the Avengers to investigate. All the while, Peter attempts to escape from the Living Brain and avoid being deleted by Max Modell before downloading himself into Octavius' discarded tentacle harness, discovering Octavius' troubled past along the way. After forming a fragile alliance with him to stop A.I.M.'s new leader MODOK, the Avengers are unable to find proof that something is wrong with the Superior Spider-Man and call off their investigation. Miles and Peter, after discovering that the harness' circuitry was also slowly degrading the latter's consciousness, are unable to convince Octavius to switch bodies again. After Venom attacks and takes Marconi hostage in exchange for the "real" Spider-Man, Octavius realizes the error of his ways just as Peter arrives and reverses the consciousness transfer.

- The Goblin Nation also appears in the second season, consisting of various Goblin clans led by Silvermane, Electro, and Crossbones, with the Goblin King as their leader. After a power vacuum is left due to the Superior Spider-Man's actions, the Goblin Nation utilizes Oscorp's goblin technology to take over New York. Upon discovering the organization, Spider-Man joins forces with Miles, Ghost-Spider, Spider-Girl, Harry Osborn / Hobgoblin, Octavius, and Marconi to defeat the Goblin clans before focusing their efforts on the Goblin King. Using a Goblin mech capable of controlling technology, the Goblin King consolidates the Goblin Nation's remnants in an attempt to secure power for himself. Realizing the Neuro Cortex can disable the Goblin mech albeit at great cost to the user, Spider-Man plans to risk his life to accomplish the plan, only for Octavius to take his place instead and give his life to defeat the Goblin King.

=== Film ===
- Concept art for the Superior Spider-Man's costume was designed by Ryan Meinerding during production of Spider-Man: Homecoming (2017) and is intended to be used in a future film within the Marvel Cinematic Universe.
- Otto Octavius as the Superior Spider-Man appears in Spider-Man: Across the Spider-Verse (2023) as a member of Spider-Man 2099's Spider-Society.

=== Video games ===
- The Superior Spider-Man appears as an unlockable playable character in Lego Marvel Super Heroes, voiced by James Arnold Taylor. He also appears in the sequel, Lego Marvel Super Heroes 2.
- The Superior Spider-Man appears as an alternate costume for Peter Parker / Spider-Man in Marvel Heroes, voiced by Christopher Daniel Barnes.
- The Superior Spider-Man appears as an alternate costume for Peter Parker / Spider-Man in The Amazing Spider-Man 2.
- The Superior Spider-Man appears as a playable character in Marvel Super Hero Squad Online.
- The Superior Spider-Man and Superior Venom appear as separate playable characters in Spider-Man Unlimited.
- The Superior Spider-Man appears as a playable character in Marvel: Avengers Alliance.
- The Superior Spider-Man appears as an alternate costume for Doctor Octopus in Marvel: Future Fight.
- The Superior Spider-Man appears as a downloadable alternate costume for Peter Parker / Spider-Man in Marvel vs. Capcom: Infinite.
- The Superior Spider-Man appears as an unlockable alternate costume for Peter Parker / Spider-Man in Marvel's Spider-Man 2 (2023).

== In popular culture ==
The Superior Spider-Man series is mentioned in The Big Bang Theory episode "The Deception Verification", when Howard Wolowitz complains about the comic while Raj Koothrappali says the storyline combines elements of Spider-Man and Freaky Friday.

== Collected editions ==
=== Volume One ===
#	Title	Material collected	Legacy	Format	Pages	Released	ISBN
Trade Paperbacks
1	My Own Worst Enemy	The Superior Spider-Man #1–5	#701–705	TPB	120	11 Jun 2013	978-0785167044
2	A Troubled Mind	The Superior Spider-Man #6–10	#706–710	TPB	112	3 Sep 2013	978-0785167051
3	No Escape	The Superior Spider-Man #11–16	#711–716	TPB	136	3 Dec 2013	978-0785184720
4	Necessary Evil	The Superior Spider-Man #17–21	#717–721	TPB	116	15 Jan 2014	978-0785184737
5	The Superior Venom	The Superior Spider-Man #22–26, Annual #1	#722–726	TPB	144	17 Jul 2014	978-0785187967
6	Goblin Nation	The Superior Spider-Man #27–31, Annual #2	#727–731	TPB	172	30 Apr 2015	978-0785187974
Complete Collections
1	Superior Spider-Man: The Complete Collection Vol. 1	The Amazing Spider-Man #698–700, The Superior Spider-Man #1–16	#698–716	TPB	512	8 May 2018	978-1302909505
2	Superior Spider-Man: The Complete Collection Vol. 2	The Superior Spider-Man #17–31, Annual #1–2	#717–731	TPB	440	11 Sep 2018	978-1302911836
Oversized Hardcovers
1	Superior Spider-Man: Vol. 1	The Amazing Spider-Man #698–700, The Superior Spider-Man #1–5	#698–705	OHC	248	17 Sep 2013	978-0785185215
2	Superior Spider-Man: Vol. 2	The Superior Spider-Man #6–16	#706–716	OHC	248	24 Apr 2014	978-0785154488
3	Superior Spider-Man: Vol. 3	The Superior Spider-Man #17–31, Annual #1–2	#717–731	OHC	432	17 Mar 2015	978-0785193951
Omnibus
	Superior Spider-Man Omnibus	The Amazing Spider-Man #698–700, The Superior Spider-Man #1–31, Annual #1–2	#698–731	Omnibus	960	6 Jun 2023	Ryan Stegman cover: 978-1302951078
	Superior Spider-Man Omnibus	The Amazing Spider-Man #698–700, The Superior Spider-Man #1–31, Annual #1–2	#698–731	Omnibus	960	6 Jun 2023	Joe Quesada DM cover: 978-1302951085
	Superior Spider-Man Returns	Avenging Spider-Man (2011) #15.1, #16-22; Superior Spider-Man Team-Up (2013) #1-12; Superior Spider-Man (2013) #6AU, #32-33; Daredevil (2011) #22; Scarlet Spider (2012) #20; All-New X-Men Special (2013) #1; Indestructible Hulk Special (2013) #1; Superior Spider-Man Team-Up Special (2013) #1; Inhumanity: Superior Spider-Man (2014) #1; Superior Octopus (2018) #1 (A story); Superior Spider-Man (2018) #1-12; Superior Spider-Man Returns (2023); Superior Spider-Man (2023) #1-8; Amazing Spider-Man (2022) #31 (Superior Spider-Man story)		Omnibus	1264	17 Feb 2026	Mark Bagley cover: 978-1302963606
	Superior Spider-Man Returns			Omnibus	1264	17 Feb 2026	Mike Del Mundo DM cover: 978-1302963613

=== Volume Two ===
#	Title	Material collected	Format	Pages	Released	ISBN
1	Full Otto	The Superior Spider-Man (Vol. 2) #1–6	TPB	136	3 Jul 2019	978-1302914806
2	Otto-Matic	The Superior Spider-Man (Vol. 2) #7–12	TPB	136	17 Dec 2019	978-1302914813

=== Volume Three ===
#	Title	Material collected	Format	Pages	Released	ISBN
1	Supernova	Superior Spider-Man Returns, The Superior Spider-Man (Vol. 3) #1–4, material from Amazing Spider-Man (vol. 6) #31	TPB	152	30 Apr 2024	978-1302955939
2	Superior Spider-Island	The Superior Spider-Man (Vol. 3) #5–8	TPB	112	17 Sep 2024	978-1302955946

=== Octo-Girl ===
#	Title	Material collected	Format	Pages	Released	ISBN
Trade Paperbacks
1	The Genius Scientist and the School Girl	Spider-Man Octo-Girl #1–7	TPB	200	May 2025	978-1974754762
2	Assailant	Spider-Man Octo-Girl #8–16, bonus manga The Marvels	TPB	200	May 2025	978-1974754762
3	Tower Attack	Spider-Man Octo-Girl #17–25	TPB	192	Nov 2025	978-1974758463
