= Giuseppe Camuncoli =

Italian comic book artist (born 1975)

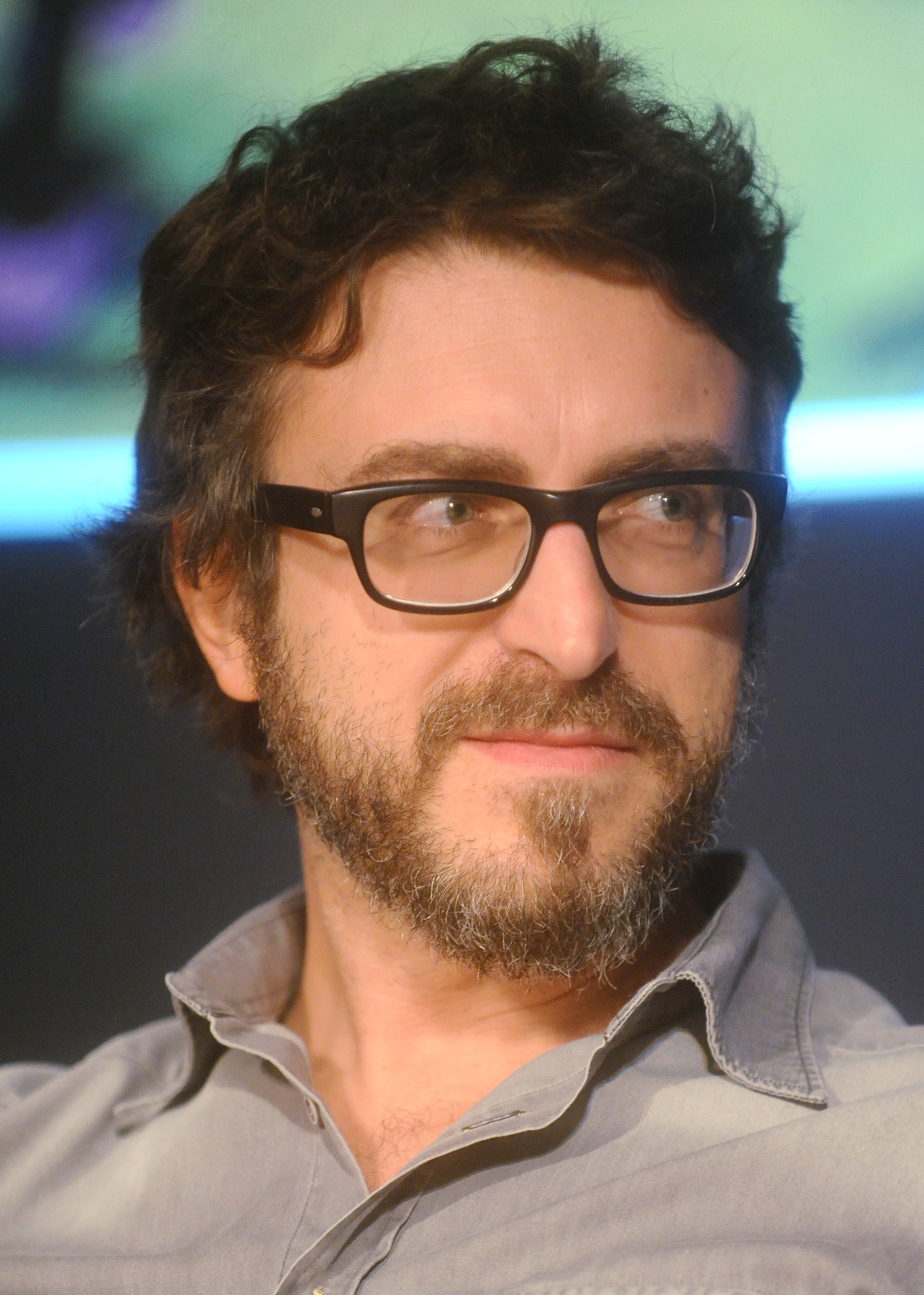
- Giuseppe Camuncoli at Lucca Comics & Games 2016
- Born: March 2, 1975 (age 51) Reggio Emilia
- Areas: Penciller, Inker
- Notable works: The Amazing Spider-Man; Hellblazer; Undiscovered Country

Giuseppe Camuncoli (born March 2, 1975) is an Italian comic book artist best known for his work on the Marvel Comics titles The Amazing Spider-Man and The Superior Spider-Man and the DC Comics/Vertigo series Hellblazer as well as his work illustrating The Storms of Chai, the last installment in the Lone Wolf gamebook series published before the death of author Joe Dever.

== Bibliography ==
=== DC Comics ===
- Swamp Thing (Vol. 3) #12–20 (pencils, with writer Brian K. Vaughan, 2001)
- Hellblazer (Vol. 1) #168, 169, 206, 243, 244, 250–253, 256–258, 261–264, 267–275, 277–279, 281, 283, 285–290, 293–300 (pencils, with writers Brian Azzarello, Mike Carey, Andy Diggle and Peter Milligan, 2002–13)
- Vertigo Pop! Bangkok #1–4 (pencils, with writer Jonathan Vankin, 2003)
- Robin (Vol. 4) #129, 137 (pencils, with writer Bill Willingham, 2004–5)
- Batman (Vol. 1) #643–644 (pencils, with writer Bill Willingham, 2005)
- 52 #41, 47 (pencils, with writers Geoff Johns, Grant Morrison, Greg Rucka and Mark Waid, 2007)
- Adventures of Superman #2 (layouts, with writer J.M. DeMatteis, 2013)
- Batman: Europa #1–4 (artist, with writers Matteo Casali and Brian Azzarello, 2015–16)
- All-Star Batman #8 (pencils, with writer Scott Snyder, 2017)
- Batman Secret Files #2 (pencils, with writer Mairghread Scott, 2019)
- The Other History of the DC Universe #1–5 (pencils, with writer John Ridley, 2020–21)
- Joker #11–15 (pencils, with writers Matthew Rosenberg and James Tynion IV, 2022)

=== Marvel Comics ===
- Annihilation: Heralds of Galactus #1 (pencils, with writer Christos Gage, 2007)
- The Incredible Hulk #603–604 (pencils, with writer Greg Pak, 2009)
- Dark Wolverine #75–77, 81–84 (pencils, with writers Daniel Way and Marjorie Liu, 2009–10)
- Daken: Dark Wolverine #1–6 (pencils, with writers Daniel Way and Marjorie Liu, 2010–11)
- The Amazing Spider-Man (Vol. 1) #663–665, 674, 675, 680, 681, 688–691, 695–697, 700 (pencils, with writer Dan Slott, 2011–12)
- Fantastic Four #607–608 (pencils, with writer Jonathan Hickman, 2012)
- The Superior Spider-Man #4, 5, 11–13, 20, 21, 27–33 (pencils, with writers Dan Slott and Christos Gage, 2013–14)
- The Amazing Spider-Man (Vol. 3) #1, 7, 8, 12–15 (pencils, with writers Dan Slott and Christos Gage, 2014–15)
- The Amazing Spider-Man (Vol. 4) #1–5, 9–16, 19–25, 800 (pencils, with writers Dan Slott and Christos Gage, 2015–2018)
- Star Wars: Darth Vader #1–25 (pencils, with writer Charles Soule, 2017–18)

=== Image Comics ===
- Bone Rest #1–8 (artist, with writer Matteo Casali, 2005–06)
- Green Valley #1–9 (pencils, with writer Max Landis, 2016–17)
- Undiscovered Country #1–ongoing (pencils, with writers Scott Snyder and Charles Soule, 2019–present)

=== WildStorm ===
- Captain Atom: Armageddon #1–9 (pencils, with writer Will Pfeifer, 2005–06)

Preceded by Humberto Ramos	The Amazing Spider-Man artist 2011–2017	Succeeded by Stuart Immonen
