= Red King (DC Comics) =

- The Red King from the cover of JLA Classified #35, art by Dan Jurgens.

Publication information
- Publisher: DC Comics
- First appearance: JLA Secret Files 2004 #1 (November 2004)
- Created by: Dan Slott (writer); Dan Jurgens (artist)

In-story information
- Alter ego: Darrin Profitt
- Notable aliases: Fallback
- Abilities: Over 63 metahuman abilities High tech body armor Able to generate alternate realities

The Red King (Darrin Profitt) is a supervillain appearing in American comic books published by DC Comics. He first appeared in JLA Secret Files 2004 #1 (November 2004), and was created by Dan Slott and Dan Jurgens.

== Publication history ==
The Red King's first appearance was in JLA Secret Files 2004 #1 (November 2004), set up to tie into an arc in the main JLA book. The "4th Parallel" arc in which he is introduced was shelved for three years until JLA Classified #32-36, which were published bi-weekly from January to March 2007.

== Fictional character biography ==
The Red King (2) confronts the JLA, from JLA Classified #34; artist Dan Jurgens.

Following a battle between the Justice League and Doctor Destiny in the dream world, Destiny's Materioptikon gem sucks his consciousness inside itself and comes into the possession of civilian Darrin Profitt. Destiny's physical body is rendered catatonic, with Martian Manhunter placing him in the custody of Arkham Asylum. Profitt is accidentally sucked inside the Materioptikon, where he encounters Destiny. Destiny states that the Materioptikon is capable of manipulating reality, but splits its user into multiple physical copies from multiple possible universes, which threatens the space-time continuum. Profitt exploits his alternate selves to gain money by testing specific outcomes and using the ones that work, eventually becoming a billionaire.

Due to boredom and in answer to a challenge posed by Doctor Destiny, Profitt acquires technology capable of defeating the Justice League and conquering the world. Now known as the Red King and working with two of his alternate selves, Profitt secretly keeps a fourth Parallel hidden from Doctor Destiny in the event that the three failed; this fourth Profitt originates from a universe where he never became the Red King. This Profitt is killed by another Red King, who has no interest in becoming a loser again.

In the Third Parallel, the Red King devastates Keystone City and Central City with meteors, killing their entire population in addition to Batman and Plastic Man. The Red King releases a wave of energy that vaporizes all the remaining League members and then sits in the ruins of Metropolis, having killed most life on Earth. The Red King abandons the Third Parallel and erases it from the Materioptikon.

In the Second Parallel, the Red King demands the unconditional surrender of all Earth's governments, or else he will destroy Earth. During the middle of his speech, the device prematurely activates, apparently killing him. Superman and the League discover that they have ninety-eight hours to evacuate Earth. The League use their powers and advanced Kryptonian technology to terraform Mars, enabling Earth's animals, plant life, and major cities to be transported there. A fleet of alien ships summoned by the Green Lantern Corps help evacuate the planet. Batman informs the League of what they need to do in order to stop the other Red Kings and do it before one of the other Red Kings erase their reality.

The Justice League of the Second Parallel realize their universe is merely a facet in the Materioptikon and must be destroyed to protect the core reality. The Second Parallel Justice League retrieve their universe's version of the Materioptikon from their reality's defeated Red King; using the power of the stone, they send Plastic Man over to the other reality to communicate with their counterparts in there and combat the Red King. This Plastic Man ends up in the First Parallel, where he posed as a bomb similar to the one that destroyed Earth in the Second Parallel. The Red King is cornered in the Justice League's base, where he is manipulated into believing that the bomb will kill him if he cannot defeat the entire League in under a minute. Wonder Woman crushes the Materioptikon, destroying the link between the final Parallel and the Materioptikon and sealing Profitt within the core reality's Materioptikon, where Destiny prepares to torture him.

== Powers and abilities ==
Using the Materioptikon, Profitt can create a finite number of parallel universes that act as mathematical models to determine favorable outcomes. He also possesses numerous metahuman abilities, including the ability to generate electricity and ice.

== In other media ==
The Red King appears as a character summon in Scribblenauts Unmasked: A DC Comics Adventure.
