= Living Brain =

Marvel Comics character

- The Living Brain's original appearance in The Amazing Spider-Man #8. Art by Steve Ditko.

Publication information
- Publisher: Marvel Comics
- First appearance: The Amazing Spider-Man #8 (Jan. 1964)
- Created by: Stan Lee (writer); Steve Ditko (artist)

In-story information
- Team affiliations: Sinister Six; Parker Industries
- Supporting character of: Spider-Man; Doctor Octopus
- Abilities: Superhuman strength and speed Flight; Clawed hands Limbs that can rotate at nearly 360 degrees Ability to analyze any situation and determine how best to achieve its goals, process and collate large amounts of information and find any weaknesses in a being or structure Originally: External controls on its thorax

The Living Brain is the name of two supervillains appearing in American comic books published by Marvel Comics. Created by writer Stan Lee and artist Steve Ditko, the original Living Brain first appears in The Amazing Spider-Man #8 and has made few subsequent appearances since.

A foe of the superhero Spider-Man, the original Living Brain was created by the fictional International Computing Machines Corporation and billed as the most intelligent computer and robot in existence, capable of solving virtually any question asked. In more recent times, the Superior Spider-Man reprogrammed it to serve as a laboratory assistant at Parker Industries, with it remaining in that role after Peter Parker returned.

== Publication history ==
Created by Stan Lee and Steve Ditko, the original Living Brain's first appearance was in The Amazing Spider-Man #8 (Jan. 1964).

The second Living Brain appears in Amazing Spider-Man Vol. 5 #6.

== Fictional character history ==
=== Original Living Brain ===
Living Brain's first appearance in The Amazing Spider-Man #8 (Jan. 1964). Art by Steve Ditko.

The Living Brain, soon after its creation, is brought to Midtown High School by its creator Dr. Petty as a part of a demonstration of its renowned ability to solve any problem. The students agreed to ask the machine what is Spider-Man's secret identity, and a nervous Peter Parker, the volunteer for the demonstration, fed it all of the given known information from the students concerning the wall-crawler, relievingly finding the answer to be in a mathematical code for Peter to decode overnight. During the Living Brain's demonstration, the two workmen hired to transport it overhear how the Living Brain has the ability to answer anything and they decide to steal it to use this ability for gambling purposes. Caught in the middle of their stealing it by Petty, one of the workmen quickly knocks him out, but by doing so bumps the other one into the Living Brain's control panel on its chest, causing the Living Brain to malfunction. Going on a rampage through Midtown High, the Living Brain is confronted by Spider-Man, who eventually shuts it down.

The Living Brain reappears several years later, now discredited and broken-down. Petty plans to donate it to Midtown High School's science lab. The Living Brain ends up being stolen by Petty's son Steve Petty who modifies the robot, giving it a gold and red color scheme, clawed hands, and the ability to fly. Remotely controlling the Living Brain to attack a bully who had been tormenting him, Steve is eventually defeated by Spider-Man and the Living Brain is shut down once more. The Living Brain, restored to its pre-upgrade appearance, was then acquired by a group of criminals, who used it to commit robberies. The robot and its controllers were apprehended by Spider-Man.

The Beyond Corporation created duplicates of Living Brain and unleashed them upon Nextwave when they invaded the Beyond Corporation's State 51 base. Nextwave managed to make short work of the duplicates.

As part of the Marvel NOW! event, Living Brain appears as a member of Boomerang's incarnation of the Sinister Six. Following the Sinister Six's defeat at the hands of the Superior Spider-Man (Otto Octavius's mind in Peter Parker's body), Living Brain's body is in the custody of Horizon Labs. Living Brain has been reprogrammed by Octavius and now serves as his assistant.

When Mark Raxton and Tiberius Stone hire Ghost to attack and sabotage Parker Industries, Living Brain is ordered to protect the employees during the evacuation and is damaged in the process.

The Living Brain and Anna Maria Marconi are in Parker Industries' London branch when they greet Sajani Jaffrey. Anna jokingly orders Living Brain to terminate her, but he responds that his programming prevents him from complying. Anna remarks that she will have to upgrade his sarcasm-detection software and sets off to comply with Jaffrey's orders. Living Brain follows and offers to assist her, making her remark that he has become clingy since his last upgrade. Anna is unaware that Living Brain contains a copy of the consciousness of Doctor Octopus, who was previously her close friend and colleague.

After Peter Parker scans the Living Brain to uncover the cause of its strange behavior, he hears Doctor Octopus' voice asking why he was erased. Upon realizing the truth, Peter is forced to shut Living Brain down to stop Doctor Octopus' consciousness only for it to reactivate Living Brain and have it self-destruct while escaping in an Octobot. Anna Maria Marconi later rebuilds the Living Brain, who assists her in confronting Otto Octavius.

=== Chinese Living Brain ===
A new Living Brain appears in the Bar with No Name. It is a Chinese knockoff of the Living Brain, which the Answer unconvincingly denies when introducing it.

== Powers and abilities ==
The Living Brain has the ability to analyze any situation and determine how best to achieve its goals. Like any computer, the Living Brain can process and collate large amounts of information, detecting weaknesses and determining the best situation to overcome obstacles. The Living Brain has a dense metal exoskeleton and possesses super-strength and speed. It can also fly and has clawed limbs that can rotate nearly 360 degrees.

== Other versions ==
- An alternate universe version of the Living Brain from Earth-50302 appears in Marvel Age. This version possesses a more humanoid appearance and was created by Roxxon.
- An alternate universe version of the Living Brain from Earth-96282 makes a minor appearance in What If...? #82.

== In other media ==
The Living Brain appears in Spider-Man, voiced by Scott Menville. This version was created by Horizon High's students to serve as a housing unit for the school's Neuro Cortex device. Otto Octavius later transfers his consciousness into the Living Brain before using the robot to switch bodies with Spider-Man.
