= Cardiac (character) =

- Cardiac as depicted in The Superior Spider-Man #8 (April 2013). Art by Humberto Ramos.

Publication information
- Publisher: Marvel Comics
- First appearance: As Elias Wirtham: The Amazing Spider-Man #342 (December 1990); As Cardiac: The Amazing Spider-Man #344 (February 1991)
- Created by: David Michelinie (writer); Erik Larsen (artist)

In-story information
- Alter ego: Elias Wirtham
- Species: Human cyborg
- Team affiliations: Parker Industries; H.E.A.R.T. Clinic
- Abilities: Accomplished physician and surgeon Superhuman strength, speed, stamina and durability Accelerated healing factor Wields a pulse staff, and rides a beta-propelled stingray hang-glider Channels beta particles via the neural web of his vibranium-mesh skin

Cardiac (Elias Wirtham) is a fictional character, appearing in American comic books published by Marvel Comics. The character was originally depicted as a vigilante and enemy of Spider-Man who opposed business practices after the death of his brother, who was denied medical treatment because the company responsible did not deem the treatment profitable. Later in his publication history, Cardiac opened a clinic on the former site of F.E.A.S.T., a homeless shelter run by Mister Negative.

== Publication history ==
Created by writer David Michelinie and penciller Erik Larsen, he first appeared as Elias Wirtham in The Amazing Spider-Man #342 (December 1990) and as Cardiac in The Amazing Spider-Man #344 (February 1991).

== Fictional character biography ==
Cover of The Amazing Spider-Man #344 (February, 1991), Cardiac's first appearance. Art by Erik Larsen and Randy Emberlin.

Elias Wirtham is a physician and surgeon, and the owner and administrator of a biological research firm. He is driven to research life-saving medicine by his brother Joshua's death from a rare condition. He later discovers Joshua's death could have been prevented: a company had found a cure for his condition, but did not distribute the medicine due to it not being "profitable". Motivated to battle corporate greed, Elias replaces his heart with a beta-particle reactor which supplies energy through a vibranium weave mesh under his skin. This energy, channeled through his muscles, increases his speed, agility, and reflexes, and can also be fired through his fists or the power staff he wields. He adopts the moniker "Cardiac" in reference to the source of his power.

=== Fighting resumes ===
Cardiac becomes a vigilante, believing himself an instrument of justice. He first encounters Spider-Man while raiding Sapridyne Chemicals, a company owned by Justin Hammer which possesses chemicals vital for the production of cocaine. Hammer hires the Rhino to kill Cardiac for raiding his company, but Cardiac defeats him. Cardiac next destroys the house and property of Albert Brukner, a corrupt Savings & Loan broker, and then attacks a subsidiary of Stane International that manufactured dangerous electronic dolls for children. He invades Stane International itself to destroy designs for a sonic missile that produce the effects of nerve gas.

Cardiac targets a filmmaker whose film is indirectly responsible for a boy murdering his own family. However, Cardiac incidentally encounters Styx and Stone and is inadvertently embroiled in a fight between Styx, Stone, and Spider-Man. At different times fighting each of them, Cardiac eventually cooperates with Spider-Man; together, they defeat Styx and Stone. Spider-Man attempts to restrain Cardiac, but he escapes.

Cardiac returns periodically to perform his version of justice. He will kill criminals, but he is often bothered by his conscience as a result. When he targets a shipment of drugs, Cardiac again encounters Spider-Man, defeating the hero. Cardiac destroys the shipment, saying that he was not "there to destroy a misguided hero". Cardiac helps Nightwatch to take down the corrupt corporation which gave him his powers. Cardiac also confronts Johnny Blaze and Ghost Rider during Blaze's mission to rescue his missing son from an evil corporation. When Wolverine seemingly goes on a rampage after having fallen under the influence of an alien, Cardiac is one of the many superheroes who attempt to stop him. Pairing with Solo is not enough, and they are swiftly defeated. Wolverine turns Cardiac's weapon on a nearby building, burying him under several large chunks of masonry.

=== Working with Superior Spider-Man ===
Elias Wirtham opens the Hospital for Emergency Aid and Recuperative Therapy (H.E.A.R.T.) in the former site of Mister Negative's homeless shelter F.E.A.S.T. As Cardiac, he steals stolen items to help aid patients being treated there. On a trip to "procure" a device to help a girl with severe brain damage, he battles the Superior Spider-Man (Doctor Octopus' mind in Peter Parker's body). Due to Peter's interference with Doctor Octopus, Cardiac is able to temporarily stun Spider-Man with a strong blast and escape with the Neurolitic Scanner (a device that Doctor Octopus had invented to develop his mind link to his tentacles), but not without being tagged by an old spider-tracer. Wirtham is preparing the Neurolitic Scanner that he previously stole to scan the brain of his patient Amy Chen to find a damaged area of her brain. It becomes difficult due to the complexity of the device. Cardiac replies that the only one who can handle it properly is Otto Octavius. Octavius demands that Cardiac surrenders the Neurolitic Scanner, and Cardiac refuses. They battle in the hospital. While Octavius tries to fend off the attacks, Cardiac tries to delay him but fails. Octavius finds the Neurolitic Scanner on Amy's head and even tries to retrieve it, but Peter refuses to allow him to do so until Cardiac manages to stop him. Octavius demands an explanation, and Cardiac reveals that Amy sustained brain damage in an attack when Octavius tried to devastate Earth with his heat satellites. Octavius feels remorse for this and decides to help Cardiac with the surgery, offering to perform the surgery himself. Cardiac thanks Octavius, who replies that he was wrong about him and offers his help on anything. Cardiac allows Octavius to borrow the Neurolitic Scanner.

When the Goblin Underground is attacking Manhattan, Cardiac is seen fighting the Goblin King's minions. While Cardiac is away fighting the Goblin King's minions, the Goblin King has the H.E.A.R.T. Clinic destroyed.

== Powers and abilities ==
Cardiac's heart has been surgically replaced with a compact beta-particle reactor, which grants Cardiac power. He can channel beta particles through the neural web of his vibranium-mesh skin into his muscles thereby endowing him with superhuman strength and regeneration, and enhanced speed, agility, reflexes and endurance, and he can channel these particles through external objects (such as his pulse staff and hang glider). He wields a pulse staff which fires concussive force bolts in a distinctive pulse-like energy signature, and rides a beta-propelled hang-glider, which were both invented by Wirtham and his associates. His vibranium-mesh skin is also able to block several bullet shots before the beta-particle energy is depleted.

Elias Wirtham's experience as a businessman provides him a strong power base with a number of connections to various enterprises. He earned an M.D. degree and is an accomplished physician and surgeon.
