= Go Down Swinging =

Comic book storyline

- Publisher: Marvel Comics
- Publication date: March – May 2018
- Genre: Superhero
Title(s)
Amazing Spider-Man #797–800
- Main character(s): Spider-Man; Norman Osborn; Carnage; Flash Thompson; Normie Osborn; Venom; J. Jonah Jameson; Superior Octopus

Creative team
- Writer: Dan Slott
- Penciller(s): Stuart Immonen, Giuseppe Camuncoli, Humberto Ramos, Nick Bradshaw
- Inker(s): Wade von Grawbadger, Nick Bradshaw
- Letterer: Joe Caramagna
- Colorist(s): Marte Gracia, Edgar Delgado
- Editor: Nick Lowe

"Go Down Swinging" is a four-issue comic book storyline in The Amazing Spider-Man, first published by Marvel Comics between March and May 2018 and featuring the fictional superhero Spider-Man. The culmination of writer Dan Slott's decade-long tenure on the title, the story overall received generally positive reviews, with critics praising the art, action, and the ending.

== Plot ==
=== Lead-up ===
Following his fight with Spider-Man, Norman Osborn resolves to find a means of restoring his powers, concluding that he has only ever defeated Spider-Man when allowing himself to draw on his inner demons.

The apparent first step in this plan occurs when Osborn manages to steal the Carnage symbiote from an abandoned S.H.I.E.L.D. storehouse while Spider-Man is occupied with the return of Scorpio. Osborn's efforts to control the symbiote initially backfire when he merges with it and finds himself overwhelmed by the urge to kill rather than his own prior plan to direct its power against Spider-Man specifically.

Norman Osborn is able to convince it to let him have control in favor of trying something other than its usual mindless slaughter.

=== Main plot ===
While interrogating a captive J. Jonah Jameson for information on Spider-Man, Osborn takes a brief interval from the torture to kill Phil Urich as the self-proclaimed Goblin King tried to raid one of his old storehouses. After Osborn appeared as the Green Goblin, Jameson mentions how he could not stop Spider-Man since even throwing Gwen Stacy off of a bridge did not stop him from fighting back. Those words cause Norman to remember that Spider-Man is Peter Parker.

Attacking the Daily Bugle in his familiar Goblin attire, Osborn gives the rest of the staff time to evacuate as he fights Peter before revealing his new bond with Carnage, proclaiming himself to be the Red Goblin, driving Spider-Man away with 'Carnage bombs' that injure his leg. Discovering a sound-transmitting spider-tracer planted on him, Red Goblin uses this to deliver a 'devil's bargain' to Peter; if Peter abandons his identity as Spider-Man and never performs any further heroics, Red Goblin will leave him alone, but the second he sees any sign of Spider-Man's return he will kill everyone in Peter's life. Peter places his Spider-Man costume top on a flagpole so that Osborn can see it burn, but privately vows that he will find a way to defeat Osborn as Peter Parker rather than Spider-Man. Normie Osborn and Stanley Osborn's nanny "Emma" finds out that Red Goblin (her husband possessed by the Carnage symbiote) is coming after the kids. To keep them safe, Emma abducts them.

Peter is able to contact various allies like Human Torch, Clash, Silk, Miles Morales, and Agent Anti-Venom to watch over his loved ones. Liz Allan had tracking chips placed in her grandchildren; she, Mark Raxton, and Harry Osborn locate the children as they discover that "Emma" is actually Emily Osborn, Norman Osborn's supposedly-late wife and Harry's mother. Red Goblin targets Harry, Emily, Liz, and Mark; proving immune to Carnage's traditional weaknesses of Human Torch's fire and Clash's sound devices. Peter is forced to step back into action despite his injured leg, with Agent Anti-Venom sacrificing a chance to get back into action himself to heal Spider-Man's injury. Upon catching up with his family members, Red Goblin merges a part of the Carnage symbiote with Normie turning him into a miniature version of Red Goblin.

Spider-Man first tries to procure more Anti-Venom from Alchemax, but is ambushed by the Red Goblin's talking Pumpkin Bombs. Seeing that Peter has donned his Spider-Man persona to stop him, Norman declares that he will kill all of Peter's family and friends. Norman first goes after Mary Jane Watson at her office inside the Stark Tower Complex, but she is helped by Venom who has been blackmailed by Jameson into protecting her. Although wary of being rescued by her longtime tormentor, Mary Jane disables Stark Tower's anti-symbiote defenses to allow Venom to fight the Red Goblin. When Spider-Man arrives, he teams up with Venom to stop the Goblin, but Osborn overpowers them both before making a tactical retreat. Knowing that Peter cannot match up to the combined strength of Norman on the Goblin Formula and the Carnage symbiote on his own, Eddie offers the Venom symbiote to as a means to better match the Red Goblin. Though reluctant to do so, Peter bonds with the symbiote. Spider-Man and Mary Jane subsequently forgive Eddie and the symbiote for all they have done over the years. Spider-Man heads off after the Red Goblin in the black symbiote suit.

Normie goes after Aunt May where she gets some unexpected help in the form of Superior Octopus and J. Jonah Jameson who uses an old Spider-Slayer. However, both of them are defeated by Red Goblin. Peter arrives after Norman and Normie have left, seeing a wounded Octavius being attended to by Aunt May. Thanking Otto for defending Aunt May, Peter offers him a truce, stating that Ock's heroism earned him a ‘clean slate’.

Norman and Normie arrive at Alchemax's headquarters. In a meeting with Liz, Norman reveals that while working at Alchemax disguised as Mason Banks he learned of a trust clause created by Liz to pass on control of Alchemax to Normie and whoever is his living legal guardian. After Harry Osborn intervenes with Norman's old Goblin equipment, Normie watches as his grandfather throws Liz through a window only to be rescued by Spider-Man, which causes him to turn on his grandfather. Despite the symbiote amplifying Normie's jealousy of his half-brother Stanley, Normie throws off its influence when he witnesses the Goblin try to kill his parents, realizing in the process that Spider-Man is not a villain but his grandfather is.

As Liz Allan is tasked by Harry to protect Stanley, Spider-Man leads the Red Goblin away from his inner circle. Norman reveals to Spider-Man he infected some of Peter's friends and family with slivers of the Carnage symbiote which he could send to their brain to kill them. However, it turns out that Flash Thompson has figured out Spider-Man's secret identity too and went to May and Mary Jane in order to remove the bombs. Flash then takes the fight to Norman and while it appears as if he's gaining the upper hand, it turns out that Norman still has some Green Goblin tech beneath his symbiote and he uses that to electrocute Flash. This causes Spider-Man and the Venom symbiote to fly into a rage, sending Osborn flying through several buildings with a single punch. Flash begs Peter to calm himself and not let his anger overtake the symbiote. Although Peter offers the symbiote to Flash to heal him, he refuses the help, stating that Peter needs the symbiote more than he does and that the Anti-Venom symbiote might kill the symbiote. Flash's injuries prove to be fatal and he dies in Spider-Man's arms.

Spider-Man confronts Red Goblin at Times Square as the latter gains the upper hand. Spider-Man manages to hold him off by pointing out that it's not Green Goblin killing his nemesis, but rather Carnage and Cletus Kasady. Red Goblin is enraged by this and when Peter removes the Venom symbiote to challenge him, Norman takes off his symbiote to reveal his old Green Goblin persona. Spider-Man manages to take his foe down and when the villain begs the Carnage symbiote to help him, the wall-crawler seemingly destroys it by hitting it with an exploding gas tank. However, the Carnage symbiote was attached to Norman when Peter destroyed it, and he wonders what sort of effect that might have had on his old foe's mind. Jameson then appears with a gun but Peter persuades Jameson not to shoot him for revenge. Norman, suffering brain-damage as a result of the symbiote's death whilst being partially-bonded to him, is last seen incarcerated at Ravencroft, believing that Spider-Man is Norman Osborn and he himself is Cletus Kasady.

=== Aftermath ===
The symbiote fragment on Normie is subsequently separated while the main symbiote is apparently destroyed. When the rest of his family rendezvous at Alchemax, Harry is determined to redeem his family's name from his father's villainous legacy and to be a responsible parent to his sons. Harry also forgives his mother for abandoning him. After getting a clean slate for his involvement in Norman Osborn's defeat, Dr. Otto Octavius reveals his new identity as Dr. Elliot Tolliver, a person who has just started working at Horizon University. He was seen applying for a job under Max Modell as Anna Maria Marconi starts acting suspicious towards Dr. Tolliver.

=== Sales ===
The first installment of the story in The Amazing Spider-Man #797 sold an estimated 128,189 issues in its initial run, an increase of 73,051 from the previous issues estimated 55,138 sales. Sales of Issue #798 sold 233,235 units, while sales of Issue #799 fell slightly to 192,609. Issue #800 sold 411,480 units, making it the number 1 selling comic of May 2018, and according to North American comic distributor Diamond Comic Distributors (DCD) it was the second best selling comic of 2018, followed by #798 at number 8 and #799 at number 10, and issue #797 at number 21.

== Collected editions ==
Title	Material collected	Year	ISBN
Amazing Spider-Man: Worldwide Vol. 9 - Go Down Swinging	The Amazing Spider-Man (Vol. 1) #797–801	December 2018	978-1302909987
Amazing Spider-Man: Red Goblin	The Amazing Spider-Man (Vol. 1) #794–801	October 2018	978-1302913540

== Critical reception ==
The story overall received generally positive reviews.

According to Comic Book Roundup, Amazing Spider-Man Issue 797 received an average score of 7.9 out of 10 based on 20 reviews.

According to Comic Book Roundup, Issue 798 received an average score of 8.4 out of 10 based on 14 reviews.

According to Comic Book Roundup, Issue 799 received an average score of 7.4 out of 10 based on 13 reviews.

According to Comic Book Roundup, Issue 800 received an average score of 8.1 out of 10 based on 20 reviews.

According to Comic Book Roundup, Issue 801 received an average score of 9.1 out of 10 based on 14 reviews.
