= Max Modell =

Fictional character in Marvel Comics

Publication information
- Publisher: Marvel Comics
- First appearance: The Amazing Spider-Man #648 (January 2011)
- Created by: Dan Slott (writer); Humberto Ramos (artist)

In-story information
- Species: Human
- Team affiliations: Horizon Labs; Parker Industries
- Supporting character of: Spider-Man; Doctor Octopus

Max Modell is a fictional character appearing in American comic books published by Marvel Comics, primarily in association with Spider-Man.

== Publication history ==
Max Modell first appeared in The Amazing Spider-Man #648 (January 2011), and was created by Dan Slott and Humberto Ramos.

== Fictional character biography ==
Max Modell is the CEO of Horizon Labs. Marla Madison helps Peter Parker get a job at Horizon Labs after he proves himself by shutting down Sajani Jaffrey's out-of-control machine. When the Hobgoblin attacks Horizon Labs, Spider-Man saves Modell from the Hobgoblin. After the Hobgoblin is repelled, Modell orders that the reverbium that Jaffrey created be destroyed.

At Andru Air Force Base, Modell is confirmed to monitor the launch of a rocket that John Jameson will be piloting. Modell and John tell J. Jonah Jameson that Peter Parker will be in attendance. On the day of the launch, Modell is present when Alistair Smythe and his Spider-Slayers attack. During Spider-Man's fight with the Scorpion, Modell makes contact with John, who tells him that the shuttle is out of control. Modell later talks to Peter, stating his belief that Peter makes Spider-Man's technology. Peter decides to play along with this claim.

During the "Spider-Island" storyline, Modell speaks to Mister Fantastic about broadcasting a frequency that could fix Spider-Man's spider senses while keeping the Jackal's Homo Arachus from leaving Manhattan. Following the Spider Queen's death, Modell thanks his staff for helping to combat the infestation plaguing Manhattan. It is revealed that Modell had secretly help developing the cure for the spider infestation from Michael Morbius, who he knew in college.

Peter and Modell coordinate John Jameson's mission on the Apogee 1 station while opening a channel to J. Jonah Jameson. This lasts until Juergen Muntz tells them that Apogee 1 is experiencing a system error caused by the Octobots sent by Doctor Octopus. Modell and Jameson watch the fight between Spider-Man, Human Torch, and John against the Octobot-controlled crew of Apogee 1 on a screen. As Apogee 1 falls out of orbit, Modell tells Jameson to have faith in Spider-Man.

During the "Ends of the Earth" storyline, it is revealed that Modell is openly gay, with his partner Hector Baez working as a lawyer at Horizon Labs. Baez defends Modell when J. Jonah Jameson makes various accusations towards Horizon Labs and plans to shut it down.

After Spider-Man stops Doctor Octopus' plot, Modell and the Horizon Labs team are congratulated for their help in stopping the Sinister Six. When Peter is told by Modell that the former should be given credit, Peter told him that he and the other workers did the heavy lifting. Hector Baez tells Modell that J. Jonah Jameson has restored energy to Horizon Labs as an apology gesture. While working with Modell, Morbius was attacked by Spider-Man for robbing Billy Connors' grave, working on Billy's body to find a permanent cure for his father, Curt Connors / Lizard. Modell helps Spider-Man track down the Lizard and revert him to his human form.

In "All-New, All-Different Marvel", Max Modell and Hector Baez are hired to run the West Coast divisions of Parker Industries. At the conclusion of the "Go Down Swinging" arc, Doctor Octopus accepts a job application at Horizon University under the alias of Elliot Tolliver. Modell later calls Tolliver to his office, where Tolliver admits to being a Proto-Clone housing Otto Octavius' mind. Modell stated that he already knew of Octavius being the Proto-Clone.

== In other media ==
- Max Modell appears in Spider-Man (2017), voiced by Fred Tatasciore. This version is Horizon High's headmaster who is aware of Spider-Man's secret identity and created the Anti-Venom symbiote.
- Max Modell appears in the Guardians of the Galaxy episode "Drive My Carnage", voiced again by Fred Tatasciore.
