= The Storms of Chai =

- Author: Joe Dever
- Cover artist: Alberto Dal Lago
- Language: English
- Series: Lone Wolf
- Genre: Fantasy
- Publisher: Holmgard Press
- Publication date: May 13, 2016
- Publication place: United Kingdom
- Media type: Print (Hardback)
- Preceded by: The Hunger of Sejanoz
- Followed by: Dead in the Deep

The Storms of Chai is a game book in the Lone Wolf series by Joe Dever. It is part of the New Order series, which details the adventures of one of Lone Wolf's disciples in the New Kai Order and not Lone Wolf himself. The book is set in MS 5102, 18 years after the ending of book 28, The Hunger of Sejanoz.

After encountering problems with a number of publishers, author Joe Dever announced on 1 April 2016 that he would self-publish the book. It was published on 13 May 2016, 18 years after the publication of book 28. It was the last Lone Wolf gamebook published by Dever before his death.

== Plot ==
The Claw of Naar is the evil wand of power used by Agarash the Damned during his ancient conquest of Magnamund. After retrieving it in Vampirium, the protagonist handed it over to the Elder Magi who tried to destroy it. That was 18 years ago, but Elder Magi are still trying to figure out how to annihilate it.

The protagonist is now living in the new Kai Monastery on the Isle of Lorn and receives grim news: several hordes of Agarashi have been spotted all over Magnamund. Lone Wolf, the Supreme Grand Master of the Kai Order, dispatches his six Grand Masters to missions across the world to investigate and stop the menaces.

One of those hordes of Agarashi is marching towards the country of Chai, ruled by the young Khea-khan Lao Tin. The reason: one of the gems that embellish the Khea-khan's throne is the Eye of Agarash, a stone that can be coupled with the Claw of Naar to increase its destructive power. The protagonist's mission is to retrieve the Eye of Agarash before their enemies. But that is the easy part: bringing back the gem to the Elder Magi, with Agarashi roaming the land of Chai, is where the real challenge resides for the reader.

== Publication history ==
In its December 2010 issue of Signs & Portents, Mongoose published the timeline of the events that took place in Magnamund between the end of book 28 and the beginning of book 29. In the same issue, the first section of the book, the Story so Far, was also published, revealing the mission that the reader had to undertake, as it is a "game book", a book where the reader must make choices to determine the outcome.

Mongoose Publishing had the rights to publish this book but in February 2013, it was announced that the publisher had lost its publishing rights of the series. German publisher Mantikore-Verlag picked up the rights to publish books 18 to 28 shortly after that, and on April 1, 2015, it was announced that it would also publish book 29.

English publisher Cubicle 7 picked up the rights for this book from Mantikore-Verlang in December 2015, but came back on its decision the following month. On April 1, 2016, Joe Dever announced that he would published the remaining Lone Wolf books himself with his own imprint, Holmgard Press, starting with the publication of book 29, which was released on May 13, 2016.

However, The Storms of Chai was first published in Italian by Vincent Books in November 2015. Alberto Dal Lago did provide the cover artwork while Marvel artist Giuseppe Camuncoli did the interior illustrations. The French version was published in June 2017.
