= Dan Slott =

American comic book writer (born 1967)

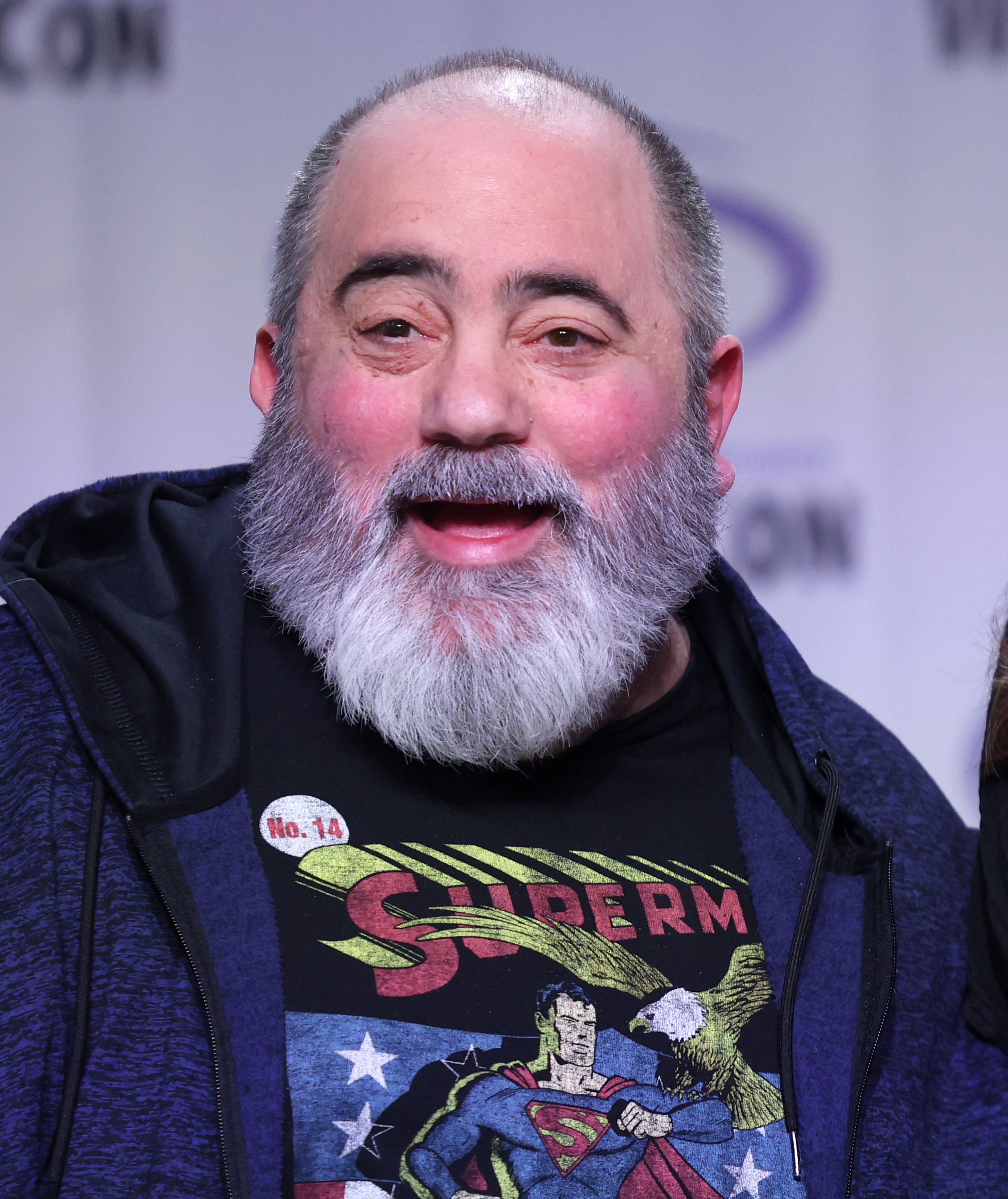
- Slott in 2025
- Born: July 3, 1967 (age 59)
- Notable works: The Amazing Spider-Man; Silver Surfer; She-Hulk; The Superior Spider-Man; Arkham Asylum: Living Hell; Avengers: The Initiative; The Mighty Avengers; The Thing; Ren & Stimpy; Looney Tunes; Batman Adventures; Tony Stark: Iron Man; Fantastic Four
- Awards: Writer of Silver Surfer #11, winner of 2016's Eisner Award for Best Single Issue

Dan Slott (born July 3, 1967) is an American comic book writer, known for his work on Marvel Comics books such as The Amazing Spider-Man, as well as The Superior Spider-Man, She-Hulk, Silver Surfer, Tony Stark: Iron Man, The Mighty Avengers, and Fantastic Four. His work for DC Comics includes the books Arkham Asylum: Living Hell and Batman Adventures.

== Career ==
=== Early writing ===
Dan Slott's first published work for Marvel was "Survival of the Hippest" in Mighty Mouse #10 and "To Bounce or Not to Bounce", an eight-page backup story in New Warriors Annual #1 both cover dated July 1991. He became the regular writer for Marvel's Ren & Stimpy comic book series with that series debut issue (Dec. 1992) and first wrote Spider-Man in an issue of Ren and Stimpy that saw Spider-Man in battle against the Powdered Toast Man. Following this, Slott wrote other children's comics, including DC's Scooby-Doo, Looney Tunes, and Powerpuff Girls. After work on Batman Adventures and Justice League Adventures, Slott was given the chance to pitch a series for DC. The resulting miniseries was Arkham Asylum: Living Hell with artist Ryan Sook in 2003. In 2004 he wrote the "4th Parallel" storyline for the Justice League which introduced the Red King; this story was published in 2007 in JLA Classified #32–36.

=== Marvel Comics ===
==== 2000s ====
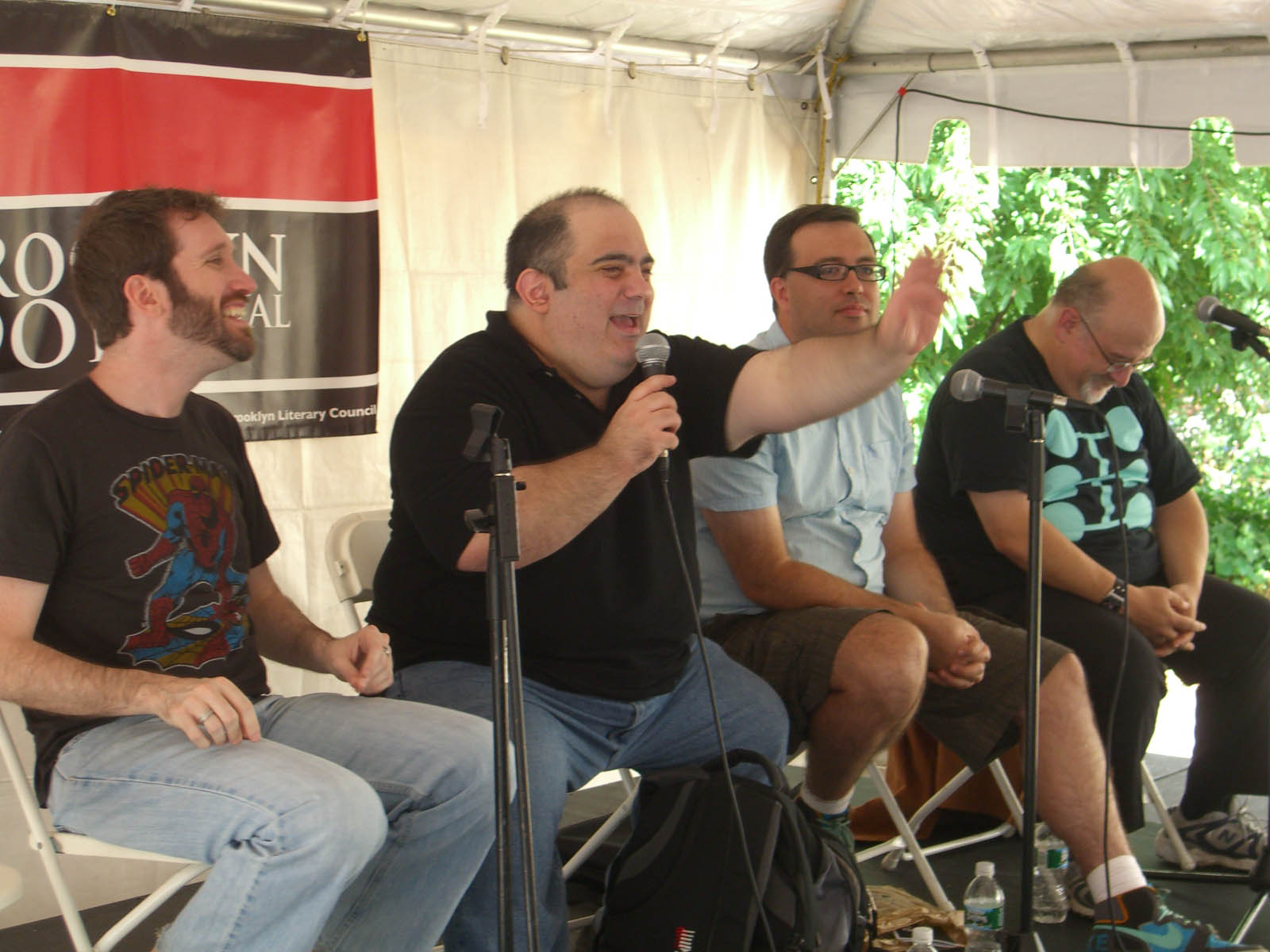
Slott speaking on a panel on comic book writing at the 2009 Brooklyn Book Festival. To Slott's right is Jim McCann, and to his left are Fred Van Lente and Peter David.

Arkham Asylum's success led to Slott's return to Marvel in 2004 to launch a new She-Hulk series. The title focused on She-Hulk as a "superhuman lawyer" in the Marvel Universe. After relaunching in October 2005, the second series met with higher sales, and after tie-ins with crossover storylines "Civil War" and "World War Hulk", reached its highest numbers yet. In 2007 Slott left the title with volume 2 #21, and became one of the writers on The Amazing Spider-Man.

While She-Hulk was on hiatus in 2005, Slott penned the Spider-Man/Human Torch miniseries, which chronicled the friendship of the two characters over the years, with each issue paying tribute to a different era of Marvel Comics.

Slott gave the team the Great Lakes Avengers their first ever solo miniseries in GLA: Misassembled, which featured a character being killed in each issue. He made the first roster changes to the team since its inception by creating a new character, Grasshopper, and reviving an obscure one, Squirrel Girl. During this period, Slott signed an exclusive contract with Marvel. He has since returned to the GLA twice, first with the 2005 GLX-Mas Special, following a name change to the Great Lakes X-Men, and then again in the 2007 Deadpool/GLI Summer Fun Spectacular with co-writer Fabian Nicieza, to coincide with Marvel's Civil War: The Initiative branding.

At the end of 2005, Slott was assigned to write The Thing's first solo series in 20 years. It was not a sales success, and was canceled with issue #8, despite Slott's attempts to rally readers in a campaign he called "Pull My Thing." The eight issues have been released in a trade paperback entitled Idol of Millions, which sees the Thing and other heroes fighting deadly roller-coasters and other machines in Arcade's Murderworld.

Slott was the writer of Marvel's Avengers: The Initiative, which launched following the conclusion of the 2006–07 "Civil War" storyline. He was one of the four writers of the thrice-monthly The Amazing Spider-Man, a schedule which began in January 2008 following the controversial storyline "One More Day".

Slott took over writing duties on The Mighty Avengers after writer Brian Michael Bendis' departure, starting with issue #21 and finishing with issue #36.

==== 2010s ====
Slott wrote the story for the Spider-Man: Shattered Dimensions video game which was released in September 2010.

In November 2010, Slott took over The Amazing Spider-Man as the sole writer, marking the comic book's change to a twice–monthly schedule, beginning with Slott's "Big Time" storyline.

The "Big Time" storyline ended with The Amazing Spider-Man #700, its final issue. While that issue's story, which involved the switching of Peter Parker's mind with that of Doctor Octopus, and ended with the death of Parker in Doctor Octopus' body and Octopus remaining in Parker's, generated controversy among fans, including death threats for Slott, it won the 2012 Diamond Gem Award for Top Dollar Comic of the Year. The comic book went through five printings, The next month saw the premiere of a new series, The Superior Spider-Man, written by Slott, and featuring the adventures of Spider-Man, now inhabited by the mind of Doctor Octopus. The first issue won the 2013 Diamond Gem Award for Comic Book of the Year Over $3.00. The Superior Spider-Man ended with issue #31, with Peter Parker back as Spider-Man, and lead to a relaunch of The Amazing Spider-Man in April 2014. The first issue of this new version of The Amazing Spider-Man is, according to Diamond Comics Distributors, "The Best Selling Comic of the 21st Century." Slott's run on Amazing included that book's portion of the 2014-15 "Spider-Verse" storyline, which crossed over all the titles starring that character, and featured Peter Parker and Miles Morales interacting with most of the other notable versions of the character interacting for the first time the comics, including Spider-Ham, Spider-Gwen, Spider-Man Noir, and Spider-Man 2099, an idea Slott had used in Spider-Man: Shattered Dimensions, and later adapted into the 2018 film Spider-Man: Into the Spider-Verse.

Slott and artist Mike Allred launched a new Silver Surfer series in May 2014. In 2016, Slott and Allred's Silver Surfer #11 won the Eisner Award for "Best Single Issue".

In 2018 ended Slott wrote four of the Top 10 selling issues for the entire industry, taking the #2, #4, #8, and #10 spots. That year Slott finished his ten year-plus run on The Amazing Spider-Man. He wrote his last major storyline, titled "Go Down Swinging", from issue #797–800, which detailed Spider-Man fighting a Carnage-bonded Green Goblin. After that, he finished his run with his final issue being #801. After finishing his run on The Amazing Spider-Man, Slott began writing Tony Stark: Iron Man and Fantastic Four.

==== 2020s ====
In January 2020, when Diamond Comics released its list of the Top 100 Best-Selling Comics of the Decade, nine of the titles were ones written by Slott: The Amazing Spider-Man #1 (2014), The Amazing Spider-Man #800, Fantastic Four #1 (2018), The Amazing Spider-Man #700, The Amazing Spider-Man #1 (2015), The Amazing Spider-Man #798, Superior Spider-Man #1, The Amazing Spider-Man: Renew Your Vows #1, and The Amazing Spider-Man #799.

In July 2022, Marvel announced that Slott would return full time to the Spider-Man franchise in October as the writer on Spider-Man a series following the aftermath of the "Edge of Spider-Verse" storyline. Slott would be joined by artist Mark Bagley on the book, which would tie into Zeb Wells and John Romita Jr.'s The Amazing Spider-Man series.

In January 2025, it was announced that Slott would end his exclusive contract with Marvel after close to 15 years to write Superman Unlimited a new monthly ongoing series from DC Comics to be published on May 21, 2025 with artist Rafael Albuquerque. The inaugural storyline saw a asteroid littering the Earth with kryptonite, allowing ordinary criminals and criminal organizations the ability to kill Superman.

== Bibliography ==
=== Acclaim Comics ===
- Acclaim Adventure Zone Digests #1–3, Acclaim Comics, 1997
- Saban's Powerhouse Digest (w/ Power Rangers Turbo and Masked Rider) #1–2, Acclaim Comics, 1997
- Troublemakers #16, Acclaim Comics, 1998

=== Archie Comics ===
- Nights into Dreams... #1–3, Archie Comics, 1998
- Sonic the Hedgehog Super Special #8 and 12, Archie Comics, 1999–2000
  - collected in Sonic Select: Book 4
- Teenage Mutant Ninja Turtles Adventures: Year of the Turtle #1–3, Archie Comics, 1996

=== DC Comics ===
- Animaniacs #15, 16, 18, DC Comics, 1996
- Arkham Asylum: Living Hell #1–6, DC Comics, 2003
  - collected in Arkham Asylum: Living Hell trade paperback
  - collected in Arkham Asylum: Living Hell: Deluxe Edition hardcover
- Batman Adventures #1–8 and 10–14 (with Ty Templeton), DC Comics, 2003–2004
  - Batman Adventures #1 reprinted in Batman Adventures Free Comic Book Day 2003
  - Batman Adventures #1 reprinted in Batman/Scooby-Doo ComicFest 2012
  - digest Batman Adventures: Rogues Gallery collects issues #1–4
  - digest Batman Adventures: Shadows & Masks collects issues #5–8
  - "Learn Spanish with Batman: Rogues Gallery" collects issues #1–4 Berlitz
  - "Learn Spanish with Batman: Shadows & Masks" collects issues #5–8 Berlitz
- Batman: Double Trouble, Scholastic Books, 2005
- Batman: Gotham Adventures #58, DC Comics, 2003
- Cartoon Network Presents #3 and 21, DC Comics/Cartoon Network, 1997 and 1999
- Cartoon Network Starring Cow and Chicken #3, 7, and 13, DC Comics/Cartoon Network, 1999–2000
  - digest Cartoon Cartoons: Volume 2 – The Gang's All Here! includes Cow and Chicken #7, DC Comics/Cartoon Network
- Dexter's Laboratory #4 and 14, DC Comics, 1999–2000
  - digest "Cartoon Cartoons: Volume 1 – Name That Toon" includes Dexter's Laboratory #4, DC Comics/Cartoon Network
  - Dexter's Laboratory Classics: Volume 1 includes Dexter's Laboratory #4, IDW
- Gross Point #2, 5, and 7, DC Comics, 1997–1998
- JLA Classified #32–36, DC Comics, 2007
- JLA: Secret Files and Origins, DC Comics, 2004
- Justice League Adventures #4, 6, 11, and 13, DC Comics, 2002–2003
  - trade paperback Justice League Adventures includes #6, 11, and 13
  - digest The Magnificent Seven includes #6 and 11
  - digest Friends & Foes includes #13
- Looney Tunes #13, 20, 25, 26, 44, 47, 49 – 52, 57, 59, 62, 65, 70, 75, 89, 93, 100, 104, 129, 171, 182, and 247 DC Comics, 1995–2019
  - Bugs Bunny & Friends: A Comic Celebration includes the stories from issues #44 and 47
- Pinky and the Brain #3–4, DC Comics, 1996
- The Powerpuff Girls #34, DC Comics, 2003
  - collected in Powerpuff Girls: Go, Girls, Go!
- Scooby-Doo #5 and 50, DC Comics/Cartoon Network, 1997 and 2001
  - story from issue 5 included in Scooby-Doo – Volume One: You Meddling Kids! digest
- Superman Unlimited #1-3
- Superman Adventures #40 and 57, DC Comics, 1999 and 2001
  - issue #40 collected in Superman Adventures: Man of Steel 2013

=== Image Comics ===
- Tomb Raider #50, Top Cow/Image Comics, 2005
  - Tomb Raider Compendium Edition includes this story (miscredited)
  - Tomb Raider: Tankōbon Vol.5 includes this story (miscredited)
  - Tomb Raider Archive Vol.3 includes this story (correctly credited)

=== Marvel Comics ===
- 2099 Unlimited #7, Marvel Comics, 1995
- A+X #1, Marvel Comics, 2012
  - collected in A+X Equals Awesome
- AVX: Versus #6, Marvel Comics, 2012
  - collected in Avengers Vs. X-Men
  - collected in AVX: Versus
- Age of Heroes #1–4, Marvel Comics, 2010
  - The Heroic Age trade paperback collects Age of Heroes #1
  - Age of Heroes collects #1–4
  - The Unbeatable Squirrel Girl Vol.2: Squirrel You Know It's True collects #3
  - also collected in The Unbeatable Squirrel Girl & The Great Lakes Avengers
  - Avengers The Initiative: The Complete Collection Vol. 2 collects #2 and #4
- All-New Marvel Now! Point One #1 Marvel Comics, 2014
  - collected in Silver Surfer: New Dawn
  - collected in Silver Surfer by Slott & Allred Omnibus
- Amazing Fantasy (volume 2) #15, Marvel Comics, 2005
  - collected in The Mighty Avengers: Dark Reign
- The Amazing Spider-Man #546–548, 559–561, 564, 568–573, 581–582, 590–591, 600, 618–621,647–660, 662–676, 678–700, 789–801 Marvel Comics, 2008–2012, 2017–2018
  - Spider-Man: Through the Decades collects #546
  - Marvel Firsts: Before Marvel NOW! collects #546
  - True Believers: Spider-Man BND #1 collects #546
  - Spider-Man: Brand New Day Vol. 1 collects #546–548 (with Spider-Man: Swing Shift and Venom Super Special #1)
  - Spider-Man: Brand New Day Vol. 3 collects #559–561
  - Spider-Man: Kraven's First Hunt collects #564
  - Spider-Man: Brand New Day The Complete Collection Vol.1 collects #546–548, 559–561, #564 (with Spider-Man: Swing Shift)
  - Spider-Man: New Ways To Die collects #568–573
  - Spider-Man: With Great Power Comes Great Responsibility #7 collects #568
  - Spider-Man: Brand New Day The Complete Collection Vol.2 collects #568–573
  - Spider-Man: Death and Dating collects #581–582
  - Spider-Man: 24/7 collects #590–591
  - Spider-Man: Brand New Day The Complete Collection Vol.3 collects #581–582, #590-#591
  - Spider-Man: Died in Your Arms Tonight collects #600
  - Spider-Man: Brand New Day The Complete Collection Vol.4 collects #600
  - Spider-Man: The Gauntlet Book 2: Rhino & Mysterio collects #618–621
  - Spider-Man: Origin of the Species collects #647
  - Spider-Man: Big Time collects #648–651
  - Spider-Man: Matters of Life and Death collects #652–654, #654.1, and #655–657
  - Marvel Point One collects #654.1
  - Venom: Flashpoint collects #654 and #654.1
  - Guardians of the Galaxy Vol.3 collects #654
  - Spider-Man: The Fantastic Spider-Man collects #658–662 (2011)
  - Spider-Man: Big Time Ultimate Collection collects #648–662, and #654.1 (2012)
  - Spider-Man: The Return of Anti-Venom collects #663–665, plus backups from #660 and #662–665
  - Amazing Spider-Man: Spider-Island: Infested collects backups from #660 and #662–665
  - Spider-Man: Spider-Island collects #666–673 and backups from #660 and #662–665
  - Spider-Man: Flying Blind collects #674–676
  - Spider-Man: Big Time Ultimate Collection Vol.2 collects #663–676 (2013)
  - Spider-Man: Trouble on the Horizon collects #678–681 and #679.1
  - Spider-Man: Ends of the Earth collects #682–687
  - Spider-Man: Big Time Ultimate Collection Vol.3 collects #677–687 and #679.1 (2015)
  - Spider-Man: Lizard – No Turning Back collects #688–691
  - Spider-Man: Danger Zone collects #692–697
  - Spider-Man: Big Time Ultimate Collection Vol.4 collects #688–697 (2015)
  - Spider-Man: Dying Wish collects #698–700
  - Morbius The Living Vampire: The Man Called Morbius collects #699.1
  - Superior Spider-Man: Volume 1 collects #698–700
  - Marvel 75th Anniversary Omnibus collects #700
- Free Comic Book Day 2007: The Amazing Spider-Man #1, (Free Comic Book Day issue), Marvel Comics, May 2007
  - collected in The Amazing Spider-Man: Swing Shift: Director's Cut (with new material), 2008
  - collected in Spider-Man: Brand New Day Vol. 1
  - collected in Spider-Man: Brand New Day The Complete Collection Vol. 1
- Free Comic Book Day 2011: The Amazing Spider-Man #1, (Free Comic Book Day issue), Marvel Comics, May 2011
  - collected in Spider-Man: The Return of Anti-Venom
  - collected in Spider-Man: Big Time Ultimate Collection Vol.2 (2013)
- The Amazing Spider-Man Extra #2
  - collected in Anti-Venom: New Ways to Live
- The Amazing Spider-Man vol.3 #1–18, 1.1-1.5 Marvel Comics, 2014–2015
  - Amazing Spider-Man: The Parker Luck collects #1–6
  - Amazing Spider-Man: Learning to Crawl collects #1.1–1.5
  - Amazing Spider-Man: Spider-Verse Prelude collects #7–8
  - Amazing Spider-Man: Spider-Verse collects #9–15
  - Amazing Spider-Man: Graveyard Shift collects #16–18
  - Original Sin collects #4–6
  - Spider-Verse collects #7–15
  - Ms. Marvel: Last Days collects #7–8
  - Ms. Marvel Vol.2 collects #7–8
  - Amazing Spider-Man Vol.1 hardcover collects #1–6, and #1.1–1.5
  - Amazing Spider-Man Vol.2 hardcover collects #7–18 (along w/ FCBD 2014: Guardians of the Galaxy #1 and Superior Spider-Man #32–33)
- Free Comic Book Day 2014: Guardians of the Galaxy/Spider-Verse #1, (Free Comic Book Day issue), Marvel Comics, May 2014
  - collected in Amazing Spider-Man: Spider-Verse Prelude
  - collected in Spider-Verse hardcover
- The Amazing Spider-Man: Renew Your Vows #1–5 Marvel Comics (2015)
  - collected in Amazing Spider-Man: Renew Your Vows trade paperback
- The Amazing Spider-Man vol.4 #1–32, Marvel Comics, 2015–2017
  - Amazing Spider-Man: Worldwide Vol.1 collects #1–5
  - Amazing Spider-Man: Worldwide Vol.2 collects #6–11
- Avengers: The Initiative #1–12, 14–20, Annual #1, Special #1, Marvel Comics, 2007–2009
  - Basic Training collects #1–6
  - World War Hulk: X-Men collects #4–5
  - Secret Invasion: Infiltration collects the last story from Annual #1
  - Killed in Action collects #7–12, Annual #1
  - Secret Invasion collects #14–19
  - Avengers The Initiative: Disassembled collects #20
  - Siege collects the Trauma short story from Avengers: The Initiative Special #1
  - Skrulls Must Die! The Complete Skrull Kill Krew collects #16–19
  - Avengers The Initiative: The Complete Collection Vol. 1 collects #1-#19 and Annual #1
  - Avengers The Initiative: The Complete Collection Vol. 2 collects #20 and Special #1
- Avenging Spider-Man #8, Marvel Comics
  - collected in Spider-Man: Ends of the Earth
  - collected in Spider-Man: Big Time Ultimate Collection Vol.3
- Dark Reign: The List: The Amazing Spider-Man #1 Marvel Comics, 2010
  - collected in Dark Reign: The List
  - collected in Spider-Man: The Gauntlet, Book 1
- Disney's Aladdin #2 and 11, Marvel Comics, 1994–1995
  - trade paperback "Disney's Aladdin" includes #2
- Doc Samson #1–4, Marvel Comics, 1996
- Earthworm Jim #1–3, Marvel Comics, 1995
- Excalibur #68, Marvel Comics, 1993
- Fantastic Four vol.6 #1-46, Marvel Comics, 2018
  - Fantastic Four Wedding Special #1, Marvel Comics, 2018
- Great Lakes Avengers #1–4, Marvel Comics, 2005
  - trade paperback G.L.A. Misassembled collects four-issue limited series, 2005
  - GLX-Mas Special, 2005
    - collected in Marvel Holiday Magazine 2010
    - collected in The Unbeatable Squirrel Girl Vol.2: Squirrel You Know It's True
  - Deadpool/GLI Summer Fun Spectacular, with Fabian Nicieza, 2007
    - collected in Deadpool & Cable Ultimate Collection Book 3
    - collected in Deadpool & Cable Omnibus
  - The Unbeatable Squirrel Girl & The GLA, collects GLA:Misassembled #1–4, GLX-Mas Special, and Deadpool/GLA Summer Fun Spectacular.
- Guardians of the Galaxy: Free Comic Book Day 2014, Marvel Comics, 2014 (Spider-Verse prelude back-up story)
- Incoming, Marvel Comics, 2019
- Iron Man 2020 #1–6, Marvel Comics, 2020
- Marvel #1000, Marvel Comics 2019
- Marvel Comics Presents #89, 93, 98, 99, 116, 119, 129, 130, 132–136, 148, and 156, Marvel Comics, 1991–1994
  - trade paperback Marvel Visionaries: Gil Kane includes #116, featuring the Two-Gun Kid
  - trade paperback Captain Universe: Power Unimaginable includes #148
  - trade paperback Destroyer includes #156
- Marvel Swimsuit Special 1992–1993, Marvel Comics
  - material from Marvel Swimsuit Special '93 collected in X-Men: A Skinning of Souls
  - material from Marvel Swimsuit Special '93 collected in The Infinity War: Aftermath
- Marvel Tales #256, Marvel Comics, 1991
- Marvel Universe: Ultimate Spider-Man #1, Marvel Comics, 2012
  - collected in Marvel Universe: Ultimate Spider-Man Reader #1
  - collected in Marvel Universe: Ultimate Spider-Man Digest Vol. #1
  - reprinted in Spider-Man/Avengers ComicFest 2012
  - reprinted in Ultimate Spider-Man ComicFest 2013
  - reprinted in Marvel Comics Digest:Starring Spider-Man #1 2017
- Marvel Year in Review 1991 – 1993, Marvel Comics,
  - material from Marvel Year in Review '93 collected in X-Men: A Skinning of Souls
- Midnight Sons Unlimited #9, Marvel Comics, 1995
  - collected in Destroyer
- The Mighty Avengers #21–36, Marvel Comics, 2009–2010
  - Avengers: I am an Avenger II collects #21
  - The Mighty Avengers: Earth's Mightiest collects #21–26 (along with Secret Invasion Requiem material)
  - The Mighty Avengers: The Unspoken collects #27–31
  - Siege collects #32–36
  - The Mighty Avengers: Dark Reign collects #21–36
- Mighty Marvel Westerns: Two-Gun Kid, Marvel Comics, 2006
  - included in Mighty Marvel Westerns hardcover
- Mighty Mouse #10, Marvel Comics, 1991
- New Warriors Annual #1, Marvel Comics, 1991
  - collected in New Warriors Classic Vol.2
  - collected in New Warriors Omnibus Vol.1
- Night Thrasher #13–14, Marvel Comics, 1994
- The Original Ghost Rider #3, 5–12, 15, and 19, Marvel Comics, 1992–1994 (backup stories featuring Phantom Rider)
- Original Sins #3, Marvel Comics, 2014
  - collected in Original Sin
- Power Pack Holiday Special #1, Marvel Comics, 1992
- The Punisher Back to School Special #2, Marvel Comics, 1993
- The Punisher Summer Special #1, Marvel Comics, 1991
  - collected in The Punisher: Eternal War
- The Ren & Stimpy Show, 1–13, 15, 17–19 Marvel Comics, 1992–1995
  - Pick of the Litter trade paperback collects issues 1–4
  - Tastes Like Chicken trade paperback collects issues 5–8
  - Don't Try This at Home trade paperback collects issues 9–12
  - Your Pals trade paperback collects issues 13–16
  - Sick Little Monkeys trade paperback collects issues 17–20
  - The Ren and Stimpy Show: Holiday Special 1994
  - The Ren and Stimpy Show Special #3: Masters of Time and Space, 1994
  - The Ren and Stimpy Show: Eenteractive Special, 1995
  - Powdered Toast Man Special #1–2, 1994–1995
- Secret Invasion: Requiem #1, Marvel Comics, 2009
  - collected in The Mighty Avengers: Earth's Mightiest
  - collected in The Mighty Avengers: Dark Reign
  - collected in The Avengers: The Many Faces of Henry Pym
- Shadowland: Spider-Man #1, Marvel Comics, 2010
  - collected in Shadowland: Street Heroes
- She-Hulk (volume 1) 1–12, (volume 2) 1–21, Marvel Comics, 2004–2007
  - Single Green Female collects volume 1 – issues 1–6
  - Superhuman Law collects volume 1 – issues 7–12
    - issue #10 is also included in Secret Wars Omnibus
  - Time Trials collects volume 2 – issues 1–5
  - She-Hulk by Dan Slott: The Complete Collection Volume 1 collects volume 1 – issues 1–12 and volume 2 – issues 1–5
  - Laws of Attraction collects volume 2 – issues 6–13
    - issue #8 is also included in Civil War: Marvel Universe trade paperback
    - issue #8 is also included in Civil War: Fantastic Four hardcover
  - Planet Without a Hulk collects volume 2 – issues 14–21
  - She-Hulk by Dan Slott: The Complete Collection Volume 2 collects volume 2 – issues 6–21
- Silver Surfer vol. 7 #1–15 Marvel Comics, 2014–2015
  - Silver Surfer: New Dawn collects #1–5
  - Silver Surfer: Worlds Apart collects #6–10
  - Silver Surfer: Last Days collects #11–15
  - Secret Wars: Last Days of the Marvel Universe collects #11–15
  - Silver Surfer by Slott & Allred Omnibus collects #1–15
- Silver Surfer vol. 8 #1–14 Marvel Comics, 2016–2017
  - Silver Surfer: Citizen of Earth collects #1–6
  - Silver Surfer: A Power Greater Than Cosmic collects #7–14
  - Silver Surfer by Slott & Allred Omnibus collects #1–14
- Sleepwalker #25, Marvel Comics, 1993
- Spider-Island: Deadly Foes #1, Marvel Comics, 2011
  - collected in Spider-Man: Spider-Island
  - collected in Spider-Man: Big Time Ultimate Collection Vol. 2 (2013)
- Spider-Man/Human Torch #1–5, Marvel Comics, 2005
  - collected as Spider-Man/Human Torch: I'm With Stupid digest
  - collected as Spider-Man & The Human Torch hardcover 2009
  - collected in The Thing & The Human Torch trade paperback 2018
- Spider-Man Magazine For Kids – Fall, Marvel Comics, 1996
- Spider-Verse #1–2, Marvel Comics, 2014
  - collected in Spider-Verse hardcover
  - "It's the Little Things" from Spider-Verse #2 collected in Amazing Spider-Man: Renew Your Vows trade paperback
- The Superior Spider-Man #1–33 Marvel Comics, 2013–2014
  - issues #1–5 collected in Superior Spider-Man: My Own Worst Enemy
  - issues #1–5 collected in Superior Spider-Man: Vol. 1.
  - issue #1 collected in Marvel NOW! Omnibus
  - issue #1 collected in Spider-Man Firsts
  - issues #6–10 collected in Superior Spider-Man: A Troubled Mind
  - issues #11–16 collected in Superior Spider-Man: No Escape
  - issues #6–16 collected in Superior Spider-Man: Vol. 2.
  - issues #17–21 collected in Superior Spider-Man: Necessary Evil
  - issues #21–26 collected in Superior Spider-Man: Superior Venom
  - issues #27–31 collected in Superior Spider-Man: Goblin Nation
  - issues #32–33 collected in Amazing Spider-Man: Spider-Verse Prelude
  - issues #32–33 collected in Spider-Verse hardcover
- The Thing #1–8, Marvel Comics, 2005–2006
  - collected as The Thing: Idol of Millions trade paperback
  - collected in The Thing & The Human Torch trade paperback 2018
  - trade paperback Pet Avengers Classic includes issue #4
  - Lockjaw: Dog Days#1 collects issue #4
  - trade paperback The Unbeatable Squirrel Girl Vol.2: Squirrel You Know It's True includes issue #8
  - trade paperback The Unbeatable Squirrel Girl & The Great Lakes Avengers includes issue #8
- Tony Stark: Iron Man #1–11, #14–19 Marvel Comics, 2018–2019
- Venom Super Special #1, Marvel Comics, 1995
  - collected in Spider-Man: Brand New Day Vol.1
- What If...? (volume 2) #52 and #63, 1993–1994
- What The--?! #23 and #26, Marvel Comics, 1993–1994
- Wolverine #102.5, Marvel Comics, 1996
  - collected in Young Marvel: Little X-Men, Little Avengers, Big Trouble
- Wonder Man Annual #2, Marvel Comics, 1993
- X-Force Annual #1, Marvel Comics, 1992
  - collected in X-Force: Under the Gun
- X-Men Annual #1, Marvel Comics, 1992

=== Mr Comics ===
- Big Max #1, Mr. Comics, 2006

== See also ==
- Spider-Man storylines
- Spider-Man collected editions
- Marvel Omnibus

Preceded by Scott Benson and Len Kaminski (The Sensational She-Hulk)	She-Hulk writer 2004–2007	Succeeded by Peter David
Preceded by J. Michael Straczynski	The Amazing Spider-Man writer 2008–2012, 2014–2015, 2015–2018	Succeeded by Nick Spencer
Preceded by Brian Michael Bendis	The Mighty Avengers writer 2009–2010	Succeeded by Al Ewing
