= Avenging Spider-Man =

American comic book series from Marvel Comics

- Cover of Avenging Spider-Man #1 (January 2012) by Joe Madureira

Publication information
- Publisher: Marvel Comics
- Schedule: Monthly
- Format: Ongoing series
- Genre: Superhero
- Publication date: January 2012 – August 2013
- No. of issues: 22 (#1–22), 1 Annual and 1 Special
- Main character(s): Spider-Man; Superior Spider-Man

Creative team
- Written by: List: Zeb Wells Greg Rucka Mark Waid Kathryn Immonen Ty Templeton Kelly Sue DeConnick Cullen Bunn Christopher Yost
- Penciller: List: Joe Madureira Greg Land Leinil Yu Marco Checchetto Stuart Immonen Matthew Clark Terry Dodson Steve Dillon Aaron Kuder Gabriele Dell'Otto Paco Medina Mike Allred Marco Checchetto David Lopez
- Inker: List: Jay Leisten Gerry Alanguilan Wade Von Grawbadger Rachel Dodson Juan Vlasco
- Letterer: Joe Caramagna
- Colorist: List: Matt Hollingsworth Edgar Delgado Dommo Aymara Laura Allred Rachelle Rosenberg

Avenging Spider-Man is the title of an American comic book series that was published monthly by Marvel Comics from 2012 to 2013, featuring the adventures of the fictional superhero Spider-Man. The events in the story take place in the primary continuity of the mainstream Marvel Universe along with the events of The Amazing Spider-Man and later The Superior Spider-Man. This was the first ongoing series to feature Spider-Man as the main character besides The Amazing Spider-Man since the cancellation of Friendly Neighborhood Spider-Man and the second volume of Sensational Spider-Man in December 2008 following the conclusion of the "One More Day" storyline. Avenging Spider-Man has also been instrumental in Marvel's shift towards including codes to receive free digital copies of the comic with purchased print comic books.

== Format ==
The format of the series was very similar to the Marvel Team-Up comic book where Spider-Man teams up with another character in every issue. The first and second volumes of Marvel Team-Up primarily (but not exclusively) featured Spider-Man whereas Avenging Spider-Man exclusively features Spider-Man.

== Publication history ==
Marvel announced the publication in June 2011. The first issue was released 9 November 2011, with Zeb Wells as the writer, Joe Madureira as the penciller, and Ferran Daniel as the colorist. The first issue outsold both issues of The Amazing Spider-Man released in November and was the sixth best selling comic book of the month.

The first three issues of the series contained a code for a free digital copy of the comic book, which is the first time any publisher has provided free digital copies as part of the print copy of the comic book. The free digital copy with purchase was extended to include the fourth issue, but Marvel changed from using a sealed poly-bag to protect the code to using a sticker so potential readers could look at the book before purchasing. The response to the free digital code in the first issue was so positive that Marvel announced they would include free digital codes in comic books in their Ultimate line of comics starting in January 2012. The free digital copy with purchase, still using the sticker to protect the code, was extended to the fifth, sixth, and seventh issues before all Marvel comics priced at $3.99 started receiving free digital codes in June 2012 (issue eight) due to the success of the free digital codes in Avenging Spider-Man and the Ultimate line of comics.

It was announced in April 2013 that Avenging Spider-Man was to end in July of the same year, with Superior Spider-Man Team-Up taking its place. It would retain the creative team of writer Christopher Yost and artists Paolo Rivera and Marco Checchetto.

== Issues ==
Issue	Guest character(s)	Villain(s) or Threat	Writer	Artist	Release date	Reception	Sales rank	Notes
1	Red Hulk	Moloids	Zeb Wells	Joe Madureira	9 November 2011	7.0/10 5.0/5	6th	
2	Red Hulk	Ra'ktar/Molans	Zeb Wells	Joe Madureira	7 December 2011	7.5/10 3.0/5	13th	
3	Red Hulk	Ra'ktar/Molans	Zeb Wells	Joe Madureira	18 January 2012	8.0/10 4.5/5	23rd	
4	Hawkeye	Sidewinder III and Serpent Society agents	Zeb Wells	Greg Land	15 February 2012	7.0/10 2.0/5	33rd	
5	Captain America	Serpent Society	Zeb Wells	Leinil Yu	28 March 2012	9.0/10 5.0/5	36th	
6	Daredevil and Punisher	The Hand	Greg Rucka and Mark Waid	Marco Checchetto	11 April 2012	8.5/10 4.5/5	27th	Story continued in Punisher vol. 8 #10 and Daredevil vol. 3 #11.
7	She-Hulk	Bastet	Kathryn Immonen	Stuart Immonen	9 May 2012	7.5/10 4.5/5	60th	
8	Doctor Strange and Silver Sable	Doctor Doom	Dan Slott and Ty Templeton	Matthew Clark	20 June 2012	5.5/10 2.5/5	51st	Epilogue to "Ends of the Earth" and further description of Web of Spider-Man #72.
9	Captain Marvel	Blackbird Security	Kelly Sue DeConnick	Terry Dodson	11 July 2012	9.0/10 3.5/5	49th	First appearance of Robyn Hood. This issue chronologically follows first appearance of Carol Danvers as Captain Marvel, but is published one week prior.
10	Captain Marvel	Robyn Hood	Kelly Sue DeConnick	Terry Dodson	1 August 2012	7.5/10 3.0/5	63rd	
11	Aunt May	Copperhead	Zeb Wells	Steve Dillon	29 August 2012	6.5/10 4.0/5	66th	Fight with Copperhead is only 2 pages. As part of 50th anniversary of Spider-Man's first appearance the story is primarily Peter and May reminiscing about Uncle Ben.
12	Deadpool	Peter's dreams/imagination	Kevin Shinick	Aaron Kuder	12 September 2012	9.0/10 3.5/5	52nd	
13	Deadpool	Hypno-Hustler	Kevin Shinick	Aaron Kuder	10 October 2012	8.9/10 4.0/5	76th	
14	Devil Dinosaur and Moon-Boy	Fire-breathing velociraptors	Cullen Bunn	Gabriele Dell'Otto	7 November 2012	7.4/10 4.0/5	76th	Takes place in the Savage Land.
15	Devil Dinosaur and Moon-Boy	Brainchild	Cullen Bunn	Gabriele Dell'Otto	5 December 2012	7.5/10 5.0/5	75th	Takes place in the Savage Land.
15.1	Bridge story between The Amazing Spider-Man #700 and The Superior Spider-Man #1.		Chris Yost	Paco Medina	26 December 2012	3.0/5 4.5/5	53rd	First issue of Avenging Spider-Man to star Superior Spider-Man instead of Peter Parker as Spider-Man.
16	Wolverine and the X-Men	Giant hybrid garden spider / human / mutant	Chris Yost	Paco Medina	16 January 2013	7.0/10 3.0/5	73rd	The hybrid was created by Jackal, who is seen in a final page cameo, later established as Gwen Warren.
17	Future Foundation	Death's Head and Time Variance Authority	Chris Yost	Paco Medina	27 February 2013	8.7/10 5.0/5	71st	Superior Spider-Man steals the captive Sandman from the Baxter Building and takes him to a hidden underwater lab.
18	Thor	Electro	Chris Yost	Marco Checchetto	13 March 2013	8.4 3.5/5	74th	Superior Spider-Man captures Electro and places him in containment next to Sandman in his hidden underwater lab.
19	Sleepwalker	Fearworm	Chris Yost	Marco Checchetto	10 April 2013	8.5/10 2.5/5	74th	
20	Secret Avengers	Chameleon and The Saints	Chris Yost	Marco Checchetto	8 May 2013	6.4/10 4.0/5	79th	
21	Secret Avengers	Chameleon and The Saints	Chris Yost	Marco Checchetto	29 May 2013	7.3/10 2.5/5	83rd	Superior Spider-Man transports the unconscious Chameleon to his hidden underwater lab.
22	Punisher	Mysterion and Hobgoblin	Chris Yost	David Lopez	12 June 2013	6.9/10 3.5/5	80th	Superior Spider-Man captures Mysterion and places him in containment with Sandman, Electro, and Chameleon in his hidden underwater lab.
Annual	The Thing	Energy field enhancing aggressive tendencies	Rob Williams	Brad Walker	31 October 2012	8.2/10; 3.5/5	94th	

== Collected editions ==
Title	Material collected	Published date	ISBN
Avenging Spider-Man: My Friends Can Beat Up Your Friends	Avenging Spider-Man #1-5	June 2012	978-0785157786
Avenging Spider-Man: The Good, The Green, and The Ugly	Avenging Spider-Man #7, 9-10, 12-13	February 2013	978-0785157809
Avenging Spider-Man: Threats & Menaces	Avenging Spider-Man #14-15, Avenging Spider-Man Annual #1, Amazing Spider-Man Annual #39, Spider-Man vs. Vampires #1 and material from Amazing Spider-Man #692	May 2013	978-0785165736
Superior Spider-Man Team-Up: Superiority Complex	Avenging Spider -Man #16-19, 15.1	July 2013	978-0785165361
Superior Spider-Man Team-Up: Friendly Fire	Avenging Spider-Man #20-22, Superior Spider-Man Annual #1, Daredevil (vol. 3) #22	January 2014	978-0785166511
Avenging Spider-Man: The Complete Collection	Avenging Spider-Man #1-15, Annual #1; Punisher (vol. 8) #10; Daredevil (vol. 3) #11; Amazing Spider-Man Annual #39; Spider-Man vs. Vampires #1 and material from Amazing Spider-Man #692	April 2019	978-1302916183
Superior Spider-Man Companion	Avenging Spider-Man #15.1, 16-22; Daredevil (vol. 3) #22; Superior Spider-Man Team Up #1-12; Scarlet Spider (vol. 2) #20; Inhumanity: Superior Spider-Man #1	January 2019	978-1302915438
