= Doctor Octopus =

Marvel Comics fictional character

- Doctor Octopus as depicted on the cover of Superior Octopus #1 Battle Lines variant (October 2018). Art by Yoon Lee.

Publication information
- Publisher: Marvel Comics
- First appearance: As Doctor Octopus: The Amazing Spider-Man #3 (July 1963); As Superior Spider-Man: The Amazing Spider-Man #698 (November 2012); As Superior Octopus: The Amazing Spider-Man #25 (May 2017); As Dr. Elliot Tolliver: The Superior Spider-Man vol. 2 #1 (December 2018); As Golden Arms: Black Panther: Intergalactic #4 (March 2026)
- Created by: Stan Lee; Steve Ditko

In-story information
- Full name: Otto Gunther Octavius
- Species: Human mutate/cyborg
- Team affiliations: As Doctor Octopus: Sinister Six; Masters of Evil; Thunderbolts; Legion Accursed; As Superior Spider-Man: Avengers; Mighty Avengers; Parker Industries; Horizon Labs; Spiderlings; Superior Six; Spider-Army/Web-Warriors; As Superior Octopus: Hydra; Hydra's Avengers
- Notable aliases: Doctor Octopus; The Master Planner the Master Programmer; The Superior Spider-Man (Peter Parker) the Superior Venom the Superior Octopus; Dr. Elliot Tolliver; Otto Blacktavius; Golden Arms
- Abilities: As Doctor Octopus/Superior Octopus/Golden Arms: Genius-level intellect; Proficient scientist and engineer; Master tactician and strategist; Wears super-strong and durable mechanical appendages; Telepathic control over his mechanical arms; As Superior Spider-Man/Superior Octopus: Possesses Spider-Man's powers, abilities, memories and equipment; Carbonadium plating over his neck and skull; Talons on his hands and feet

Doctor Octopus (Dr. Otto Octavius), also known as Doc Ock for short, is a fictional character appearing in American comic books published by Marvel Comics. The character was created by Stan Lee and Steve Ditko and first appeared in The Amazing Spider-Man #3 (July 1963). He is a highly intelligent, myopic, and stocky mad scientist who sports four strong and durable appendages resembling an octopus's tentacles, which extend from his body and can be used for various purposes. After his mechanical harness became permanently fused to his body during a laboratory accident, he turned to a life of crime, and came into conflict with the superhero Spider-Man. He has endured as one of Spider-Man's most prominent villains, and is regarded as one of his three archenemies, alongside the Green Goblin and Venom. He is the founder and leader of the Sinister Six, the first supervillain team to oppose Spider-Man.

While usually portrayed as a supervillain, Doctor Octopus has also been occasionally depicted as a conflicted antihero and ally of Spider-Man. Following Spider-Man's death in the 2012 storyline "Dying Wish", which saw a dying Octavius swapping bodies with the hero and letting him die in his original body, Octavius was motivated to prove he could be a better Spider-Man. As such, he adopted the Superior Spider-Man alias, introduced in Avenging Spider-Man #15.1 following a cameo in Daredevil vol. 3 #21 (both December 2012), as the third predominant main continuity Spider-Man. The Superior Spider-Man possesses all of the original Spider-Man's abilities, memories, and equipment, along with additional gadgets created by Octavius, though he often struggles to live up to his predecessor's legacy and seeks to turn his life around after being a villain for years.

In 2013, Marvel launched a 33-issue The Superior Spider-Man comic book series focusing on the character's redemption and superhero career, ending with the original Spider-Man being resurrected after the death of Otto Octavius. Following Spider-Verse, a copy of Octavius' consciousness became the anti-villain Superior Octopus, though a second volume of The Superior Spider-Man launched in 2018 saw the duplicate taking on the mantle and the new name Dr. Elliot Tolliver before returning to the Doctor Octopus mantle as an antihero, having his soul restored and memories of redemption erased by Mephisto, before returning to the role of Superior Spider-Man in 2023 in a new series by Dan Slott, and Spider-Man: Octo-Girl by Hideyuki Furuhashi and Betten Court, with his good and evil selves separated into different bodies. One of his evil selves, on being placed in a Wakandan body in 2026's Black Panther: Intergalactic, renames himself Otto Blacktavius / Golden Arms.

Comics journalist and historian Mike Conroy writes of the character: "Created by Stan Lee and artist Steve Ditko, Doc Ock, as he became known, has become one of the web-slinger's most persistent, enduring, and dangerous foes." A fan-favorite character and well-known figure in popular culture, Doctor Octopus has been featured in various media adaptations of Spider-Man over the years, including feature films, television series, and video games. In live-action, Alfred Molina portrayed the character in the films Spider-Man 2 (2004) and Spider-Man: No Way Home (2021). Kathryn Hahn voiced a female version of Doctor Octopus named Olivia "Liv" Octavius in the animated film Spider-Man: Into the Spider-Verse (2018), with the comic-book Lady Octopus then being redesigned after her, before, in 2025, Olivia Octavius was introduced to the main Earth-616 continuity in the "One World Under Doom" event as the future daughter of Otto Octavius.

== Publication history ==
Doctor Octopus first appeared in The Amazing Spider-Man #3 (July 1963), created by writer Stan Lee and artist Steve Ditko. Lee recounted: "Usually in creating a villain the first thing I would think of was a name, and then I would try to think of, 'Well, now that I've got the name, who's the character going to be and what will he do?' For some reason, I thought of an octopus. I thought, 'I want to call somebody Octopus. And I want him to have a couple of extra arms just for fun'. But I had to figure out how to do that". The character reappeared in The Amazing Spider-Man #11–12, then again in #31–33.

Doctor Octopus is regarded as one of Spider-Man's most infamous enemies. He has been cited as the man Peter might have become if he had not been raised with a sense of responsibility. He is infamous for defeating Spider-Man the first time in battle and for almost marrying Peter's Aunt May. He is also the founder and core leader of the Sinister Six, and has referred himself as the "Master Planner". ("If This Be My Destiny...!") Later depictions revealed him in Peter Parker's body where he was the titular character from 2013 to 2014. In 2018, he returned as the Superior Spider-Man in a series written by Christos Gage and illustrated by Mike Hawthorne, and again in 2023 in a new series by Dan Slott, and Spider-Man: Octopus Girl by Hideyuki Furuhashi and Betten Court.

== Fictional character biography ==
Born in Schenectady, Otto Octavius was the only child of Torbert Octavius, a construction worker, and Mary Lavinia Octavius, a homemaker. While Mary loved and supported Otto right from the beginning, Torbert was a violent alcoholic who regularly beat Otto and his mother. The young Octavius's shyness and good work in school got him labeled as a "teacher's pet" and targeted as a subject for bullying. Torbert hated having a bullied son and, believing that a man's worth was determined by his dominant attitude and physical strength, roared at him to use violence in dealing with the bullies. Mary Octavius would always defend her son from Torbert's tirades, saying he was a gifted thinker who would use his brain to solve problems, not his fists. Due to his mother's insistence and her disgust towards men who worked in common manual labor, Octavius was determined not to become like his father and threw all his efforts into his education, regularly scoring top marks. Octavius' devotion to study paid off with him being awarded a university scholarship at M.I.T.. During Octavius's freshman year of college, he was undecided in his studies until they were briefly interrupted by Torbert's death in a construction accident. Otto attended the funeral for his mother's sake, although he himself did not mourn his father's death and later privately expressed his desire to have seen him suffer more. When Mary remarked that "an early death is a manual laborer's" and she expected better from her son, this seemed to spur an obsession in Octavius about the hard sciences, and he declared his major to be physical science. His obsession, however, did not manifest immediately, and he was regarded by his school friends as a devoted student who was genuinely interested in the studies. He graduated near the top of his class, and was considered a catch to many scientific firms. Octavius was soon hired by an engineering firm.

Octavius became a respected nuclear physicist, atomic research consultant, inventor and lecturer. He designed a set of highly advanced mechanical arms controlled via a brain–computer interface to assist him with his research into atomic physics. The tentacle-like arms were resistant to radiation and were capable of great strength and highly precise movement, attached to a harness that fit around his body.

=== Criminal career begins ===
During an accidental radiation leak that ended in an explosion, the apparatus became fused to Octavius' body. It was later revealed that the radiation, or possibly his own latent mutation, had mutated his brain so that he could control the movement of the arms using his thoughts alone. The tentacles have since been surgically removed from his body, although Octavius retains the power to control them telepathically from great distances. The accident also seemingly damaged his brain (although it was later suggested that what was interpreted as brain damage was, in fact, his mind rewiring itself to accommodate four extra limbs), and the scientist turned to a life of crime, first taking the hospital hostage and calling himself "Doctor Octopus" from the derogatory name that his co-workers had given him. Though Doctor Octopus himself is portly, in poor physical shape, and is near-sighted, with his harness attached he is physically more than a match for Spider-Man. The accident also made his eyes very sensitive to light, requiring him to wear glasses with shaded lenses.

Over the years, Doctor Octopus has become one of the most identifiable members of Spider-Man's rogues gallery. Doctor Octopus formed the original Sinister Six to fight Spider-Man after taking Betty Brant and May Parker hostage. He has led subsequent Sinister Six groups and usually takes offense when someone else leads the team. Disguised as the Master Planner, he organized theft of atomic equipment. After he stole a formula that Spider-Man needed to cure his Aunt May, Spider-Man tracked Doctor Octopus' gang to their base. In the ensuing fight, Spider-Man is trapped underneath a collapsed building. Seemingly doomed, Spider-Man overcomes. It is later revealed he used a scuba tank to escape.

Doctor Octopus later attempts to steal the Defense Department's Nullifier device, and sets a trap for Spider-Man. He became May Parker's tenant, then got close enough to use the Nullifier on Spider-Man; although he had hoped that it would merely nullify Spider-Man's web-shooters, the radiation in Spider-Man's blood resulted in the Nullifier's interaction with Spider-Man's unique biology rendering him amnesiac, Doctor Octopus subsequently tricking Spider-Man into helping him before Spider-Man's own better nature resulted in him turning against his 'partner' despite his memory loss long enough for John Jameson to use the Nullifier to shut down his tentacles.

Doctor Octopus later exhibited the ability to activate his mechanical arms remotely, and used them to free himself from prison. His resulting battle with Spider-Man resulted in Captain George Stacy's death. Doctor Octopus later waged a gang war with Hammerhead. He attempted to wed May Parker to acquire an island with an atomic plant which she had recently (and unknowingly) inherited.

His crowning achievement of evil was the near-fatal beating of the Black Cat (Spider-Man's then-partner) which led to Spider-Man beating Doctor Octopus to within an inch of his life. The trauma of the beating he received from Spider-Man left Otto Octavius afraid of Spider-Man and spiders in general for years, and he needed to be treated for his acute arachnophobia. Spider-Man was forced to let his nemesis beat him in combat so as to allow Octavius to break free of his fears and recruit him to save New York City from an exploding nuclear reactor; Octavius had been planning to detonate the reactor to kill Spider-Man indirectly, but after his out-of-control arms beat Spider-Man seemingly senseless, Spider-Man persuaded him to shut down the reactor to ensure that there were witnesses to his 'great triumph'. Octavius decided to let Spider-Man live on the grounds that he would now have to cope with the same humiliation he had endured.

During the "Secret Wars II" storyline, Doctor Octopus was brainwashed by Mephisto's minion Bitterhorn into joining the Legion Accursed. They were sent to come in contact with Beyonder and fought Thing.

Doctor Octopus later formed a version of the Masters of Evil which also consisted of Absorbing Man, Gargantua, Jackhammer, Oddball, Powderkeg, Puff Adder, Shocker, Titania, and Yellowjacket. He led the Masters of Evil in a plot to steal the technology of the Avengers. They ended up fighting the Guardians of the Galaxy who came from an alternate future timeline. Doctor Octopus got away when Gargantua, Puff Adder, and Shocker started to sympathize with the Guardians of the Galaxy.

=== "Death" and resurrection ===
During the "Clone Saga", Doctor Octopus saved Spider-Man from certain death from a poison injected by the Vulture, although this was only because he desired to be the one to kill Spider-Man. During the healing process, he discovered Spider-Man's identity and then allowed himself to be taken in by police, expecting to be saved by his accomplice/lover Stunner. However, Stunner was knocked out and Doctor Octopus was murdered by the insane Spider-Man clone Kaine Parker.

Carolyn Trainer took over as "Doctor Octopus" until her teacher was resurrected by a branch of the mystical ninja cult known as the Hand. Upon his resurrection, it was revealed that he now had no knowledge of Spider-Man's identity, as the memories he gained came from a computer chip provided by Carolyn Trainer and the memory of Spider-Man's identity had not been recorded at the time of his death.

=== Subsequent schemes ===
In later years, Octavius attempted to create his own personal assassin in the form of a villainous mutated entity he dubbed "Spider-Woman". He has also had to deal with another usurper, in the form of arrogant young businessman and con artist Luke Carlyle, who pretended to employ Octavius at his company. Tiring of his life of crime and wishing to return to an engineering career, Octavius accepted the offer. This proved to be a ruse, and Carlyle subdued Doctor Octopus and stole his technology, using it to create his own version of Octavius' harness and tentacles. During a prolonged battle with Octavius and Spider-Man, Carlyle was defeated when Doctor Octopus ripped open his suit, allowing Spider-Man to fill Carlyle's suit with webbing, although Doctor Octopus informed his enemy that he only did this to hurt Carlyle rather than to help Spider-Man.

Then, Doctor Octopus took the ambassador of the newly formed Free Palestinian State hostage, demanding that in exchange for the ambassador's freedom, Spider-Man would meet him in Times Square and unmask himself in front of the world. When Spider-Man went to Times Square, he pulled off his mask to reveal another mask, angering Octavius enough to distract him from the release of the ambassador by agents of the Israeli Secret Service.

Doctor Octopus was taken to Ryker's Island and was drugged and brainwashed to kill the Green Goblin. He interrupted a battle between Spider-Man and the Green Goblin on the Brooklyn Bridge, and the two villains were struck by lightning and fell into the river below. Octopus was dragged out days later with no memory of the event and missing two months of his life.

While hiding in a plant that was owned by the villain Fusion, Octavius was apparently forced to work for Fusion in helping him recover the 'John Hancock' satellite, once used to find nuclear weapons but now capable of finding potentially radioactive superhumans such as the Hulk or Spider-Man. Although Fusion had apparently forced Octavius into submission, Octavius eventually revealed that he had merely been faking his submission so that Fusion could do all the hard work of finding the satellite for Octavius to sell off, subsequently beating Fusion half to death and attempting to sell the satellite himself before he was caught and defeated by Spider-Man.

=== Civil War ===
Octavius unsuccessfully tried to form and lead another version of the Sinister Six, because Captain America's Secret Avengers managed to defeat the villainous group, although Doctor Octopus himself eluded authorities. In Sensational Spider-Man #28, Doctor Octopus is seen viewing a telecast of Peter Parker revealing himself to be Spider-Man. Doctor Octopus then goes rampaging throughout the city, in utter disbelief that not only was he beaten numerous times by a teenager, but of the lost opportunity he had when he unmasked Parker in their second encounter (at the time, Octavius assumed he was an impostor). He is again defeated by Spider-Man, who confronts Doctor Octopus unmasked, after two of Peter's students distract Octavius. He is then sent to Baron Zemo's supervillain detention facility (as seen in Thunderbolts #104 and Iron Man (vol. 4) #14). In "One More Day", Spider-Man contacts Octavius to see if he can help with Aunt May's condition.

=== Dying ===
When Doctor Octopus learns that he is dying due to the years of punishment his body took in his villainous career, facing superhuman foes when he is fundamentally human once getting past the tentacles, he becomes increasingly despondent and brazen in his final plans. Intending to leave a lasting legacy, he attempts to exert control over New York City by using his newly minted Octobots, but while he consciously intends to help, his subconscious drives him to turn the city's resources against Spider-Man, and he also targets May Parker aggressively (deeming her guilty of being due to marry J. Jonah Jameson's father J. Jonah Jameson, Sr.), subtly disrupting the planned marriage. Spider-Man is eventually able to take control of Octavius's planned network, forcing Octavius to flee while vowing revenge.

In his desperate attempts to prolong his life, Octavius reforms the Sinister Six, wishing to acquire Menace's unborn son, hoping to synthesize a pure strain of the Goblin Serum, only to be thwarted again by the efforts of Spider-Man and the guilty conscience of the Lizard, reigniting his bitterness towards his foe, but gaining a grudging acknowledgment of his abilities. Octavius and Spider-Man keep crossing their ways during the following months, with the Avengers fighting a new iteration of the Sinister Six, Doctor Octopus sending a remote Octobot in John Jameson's shuttle, and Octavius contacting Iron Man to force him to find a cure for his degenerative condition. However, when Iron Man genuinely offers to have the brightest minds in the Marvel Universe find a viable cure, Octavius smugly refuses, in favor of witnessing Stark admit that he cannot do it and beg for mercy to disarm a device that Octavius had claimed was a bomb, basking in this "proof" of his (supposedly) superior intellect.

His attempts to prolong his life, however, do not hinder a more vast and sinister plan, in which he has the Sinister Six fighting the Avengers Academy for a piece of Hank Pym's technology, the Future Foundation for a piece of Reed Richard's technology, and the Intelligencia for the Zero Cannon, a powerful antigravity weapon, later revealing to have gained something useful from his early foray in John Jameson's shuttle. All this careful preparation came to fruition during the "Ends of the Earth" storyline, where the apparently mismatched pieces of technology stolen are used to build a satellite net, the Octavian Lens, able to alter the world's climate by enhancing or smothering solar rays.

Doctor Octopus at first claims to have a benevolent intent, wishing to halt the greenhouse effect in exchange for gratitude and recognition, but he is soon exposed by Spider-Man (having enhanced himself with new technology created by Horizon Labs), the Black Widow and Silver Sable, who provoke him into revealing his real plan: immolate a great part of the entire population to prevent anyone from surviving his impending death, having the survivors remember him in perpetual fear and awe. Playing over his ego, Spider-Man manages to stall him, by reminding him that, even if anyone managed to survive a drastic heating of the entire Earth, the survivors would likely be brain-damaged, and as such unable to remember his actions. Spider-Man then roughly defeats him, in retaliation for Silver Sable's death, openly mocking and berating his efforts by claiming that, because of the Octavian Lens' destruction and his declining health, he is now going to die alone, forgotten and without a legacy.

=== "Death" and rebirth ===
Even captivity and incarceration were unable to stop Octavius. Since Spider-Man was forced to access the Octobots' hive mind several times in previous months, he unwittingly gave Octavius unrestricted access to his mind, allowing him to program a lone Octobot to swap their consciousnesses. Octavius is now in Peter Parker's body and able to access his foe's memories, but with none of his restraints content of living his civilian life and planning for his future, while his foe is now trapped in Octavius' failing body.

Peter is able to recruit the Scorpion, Hydro-Man and the Trapster with the task of keeping him alive and capturing "Spider-Man" in an attempt to reverse the mind swap. However, the Trapster's portable life support can give Peter only 700 minutes to live. As such, Peter openly antagonizes "Spider-Man". While Peter's attempt to reclaim his body fails, he is able to imbue his nemesis with his very memories and values before apparently dying in Octavius' crippled body. Distraught, Octavius (in a sudden surge of empathy for his sworn nemesis) vows to steer himself away from villainy and accepts Peter's dying wish of having a Spider-Man protect New York. Octavius claims that, since he now holds the physical might and the good values embodied by Spider-Man but also the boundless ambition and the scientific mindframe of Doctor Octopus, he will surpass the "Amazing Spider-Man", becoming a "Superior Spider-Man".

=== The Superior Spider-Man ===
Within Spider-Man's body, Octavius starts his new career as a hero by redesigning his gear and putting his past as a villain behind himself. However, he soon finds himself the target of several villains, all trying to take over the place left by the seemingly-dead Doctor Octopus and his Sinister Six. While they are still no match for the new, more ruthless Spider-Man, his violence and new mannerisms start to tip off several of his close friends and allies.

Despite his accomplishments, Octavius is revealed to be still haunted by Peter Parker's lingering spirit, unable to reassert control over Spider-Man's shared body, but actively hampering his efforts to stray from Peter's values, and trying to reclaim his body. Despite Peter's lingering influence, Octavius's refusal of Peter's values and perceived screw-ups prompts him to "rectify" some mistakes: "Peter" enrolls back to college, pursuing actively the PhD Peter denied himself in the past, and breaks the self-imposed "no-kill rule" by taking a proactive stance against evildoers and criminals. However, Octavius continues to insist that he is Spider-Man.

Attempting a mind-wipe of all of Peter's memories to destroy the living consciousness completely, Octavius manages to delete the Daily Bugle memory. Realizing Peter would not surrender, Octavius directly engages his foe in Spider-Man's mind. After beating Peter to a pulp by breaking his spirit with the knowledge Peter was willing let a girl named Amy come close to death when Octavius was performing surgery on her with a scanner that would have detected him, Octavius declares his final victory while calling Peter unworthy to be called Spider-Man and believes that he deleted all of Spider-Man's memories. Returning to the real world, Octavius rejoices from his belief that he is free and has achieved victory over Spider-Man. But this erasure has also deprived him of Spider-Man's memories, leaving it more difficult for him to pose as Spider-Man, with some of Peter's friends (such as Carlie, Mary Jane, and J. Jonah Jameson, Sr.) questioning Spider-Man's more brutal approach.

It is later revealed that Peter's consciousness survived. Peter finds that Octavius's delete has left him with very few memories of his own, but after realizing those he still has are the ones that define him, vows not to give up, and that he will regain control of his body. The Superior Spider-Man finds himself facing the full force of the Goblin Underground since the possession of the Venom symbiote 31 days ago. When the Superior Spider-Man finally confronts the Goblin King, he mentions that he knows about Doctor Octopus' mind-swap with Spider-Man. The Goblin King then makes his next move by having missiles targeted at Spider-Island.

Octavius survives the bombardment and escapes with the Living Brain. He then tries to find the Goblin King; however, before he can do so, Menace takes Anna Maria Marconi hostage. Meanwhile, the Goblin destroys all the buildings that mean something to Octavius, to punish him for robbing the Goblin of his dream of killing Spider-Man. Heading to Alchemax, Octavius is confronted by Spider-Man 2099, who takes control of the Spider-Slayers. Although he manages to escape, Octavius is forced to realize that he has failed in his goal to be a 'Superior' Spider-Man when the restored Peter Parker takes over to save a child from a runaway train where Octavius hesitated, reflecting that he is aware of his fundamental inferiority, as he overcompensates while Peter holds himself back, but acts when he has to. Octavius then willingly deletes his own consciousness so that Peter can regain control of his body.

=== Spider-Verse ===
In the run-up to Spider-Verse, Octavius (from a point when he was still working at Horizon Labs in Peter Parker's body) was sent to the year 2099 by accident while dealing with the temporal anomalies caused by Horizon's time portal. Trapped in the future, he attempted to return home by creating a dimensional portal, but found himself travelling to various alternate universes – including one where Spider-Man joined the Fantastic Four and a variation of the House of M – where all the Spider-Men were dead. Realizing that something was hunting Spider-Men across other dimensions, Octavius began to gather some of the more ruthless Spider-Men into a team that could oppose whatever was killing them, including Spider-Man Noir, a multi-armed Spider-Man, Pavitr Prabhakar, and a Peter Parker working in black ops with Wolverine. As the crisis unfolds, Octavius takes command of a group of alternate Spider-Men, considering himself particularly qualified to lead them due to his unique nature and willingness to kill, but when his team is confronted by another group led by the Peter Parker of Earth-616 – who Octavius presumes is a past Peter as he cannot contemplate the possibility that he will fail- he is forced to concede to Peter's leadership when Peter defeats him in a fight, Peter stating that killing Morlun and the Inheritors is not the answer as their enemies will just come back, and the Spiders need a new plan. Although he realizes that Peter comes from his future when Peter recognizes Anna Maria's name, Otto is forced to acknowledge his own failures when he learns that another Earth where Ben Parker was the Spider-Totem was reduced to a nuclear wasteland due to the actions of his own local counterpart.

To stop the Inheritors from traveling around the multiverse, hunting all animal totems as fast as possible, Octavius identified the Master Weaver as the source of their abilities to traverse the multiverse, and killed him. However, Morlun feared the consequences of this action, resulting in Karn, the surviving defected Inheritor, taking the Weaver's place (although it was noted that the Weaver was actually Karn's future self, creating a complex temporal paradox). Having learned that he was 'destined' to be replaced by Peter Parker, Octavius attempted to attack the multiversal web to 'save' himself from his destiny, claiming that he was giving the spiders the 'gift' of free will, but the Earth-616 spiders were able to defeat him as their surviving allies returned to their home dimensions. Before he departed, Octavius issued a time-delayed message to the Anna Maria program, intended to activate 100 days after he returned to his home time, but upon his return to his time, his memory of his time with the Spider-Army is erased, allowing history to unfold as it should.

=== All-New, All-Different Marvel ===
As part of the All-New, All-Different Marvel event, Otto Octavius is still dead but a copy of his consciousness is shown to be inside the Living Brain. Following the events of Spider-Verse, Otto Octavius had backed up his consciousness in one of his gauntlets (the Superior Spider-Man's web-shooters) that slept for 100 days using the technology he acquired from 2099. The gauntlet housed a copy of Octavius's consciousness up to the point of Spider-Verse (without the memories of learning about power and responsibility for his act of self-sacrifice in Goblin Nation, as this copy would remain asleep during this time). After transforming the gauntlet into a version of an Octobot, he backed himself up in the Living Brain while waiting for the next opportunity to take over Parker's body again, planning to act at a time when Parker's spider-sense would be taxed so that he would miss the relevant signals.

At the time when the Living Brain was at Parker Industries' London branch, Doctor Octopus' consciousness expresses anger over being forced to act like their lackey. After Sajani Jaffrey is fired by Peter Parker for conspiring against him, Doctor Octopus' consciousness smirks as Anna is made the head of Parker Industries' London branch.

==== "Dead No More: The Clone Conspiracy" ====
During the "Dead No More: The Clone Conspiracy" storyline, Peter decides to have Parker Industries get familiar with New U Enterprises' "New U" system, which is a program where replacement organs are cloned for those suffering from serious injuries. Upon hearing about it from within the Living Brain, Doctor Octopus' consciousness expresses an interest in the procedure. When Peter Parker scanned the Living Brain to find out why it was acting unusually, Doctor Octopus' consciousness asked why it was erased. Realizing the truth, Peter Parker shut down the Living Brain, only for Doctor Octopus' consciousness to reactivate it and cause it to self-destruct while escaping in the Octobot. Arriving at New U Enterprises, the Doctor Octopus-possessed Octobot plans to get his biological body back, convinced that the consciousness in Parker's body was "infected" by its time in Spider-Man to believe that Peter was superior rather than himself. Upon heading to Potter's Field, the Doctor Octopus-possessed Octobot finds that Doctor Octopus' body was grave-robbed, alongside those of Alistair Smythe and other villains. It traces the grave robbery to New U Technologies. Finding Doctor Octopus' body, the Doctor Octopus-possessed Octobot allowed it to be cloned and perfected. After eliminating the copy of Peter Parker's consciousness, Doctor Octopus gains control of the clone body and emerges from the vat.

While studying the clones of Kaine and Electro to perfect the Proto-Clone, Anna Maria is brought to Otto and she becomes uncomfortable when Doctor Octopus starts appealing towards his love interest. When Jackal enters the laboratory, Anna Maria reveals she knows how to stop the decaying process on the clones and Jackal offers her the "Proto-Clone" body in exchange for the formula. Octavius takes offense to Jackal's comments on Maria's dwarfism and attacks his boss. Then he pulls a switch which activates the Carrion virus in all of the clones and causes them to start rapidly decaying.

Doctor Octopus fights Jackal to allow Peter and Anna Maria the time to transmit the frequency, Spider-Man correctly anticipating that Octavius would act to protect Anna regardless of their own history. The frequency has a huge effect on Doctor Octopus and Jackal. After checking New U Technologies' Haven following the broadcast, Spider-Man and Anna Maria find that Ben Reilly, Doctor Octopus, and Gwen Stacy have been seemingly reduced to dust. It was later revealed that Doctor Octopus rendered Ben unconscious and escaped by transmitting his mind into the Proto-Clone (a perfect clone of Peter Parker) before Ben could.

=== Becoming the Superior Octopus ===
With his new body, Otto Octavius returns to one of his old bases only to find it is being occupied by Hydra. He defeats the Hydra soldiers, but is then recruited into Hydra by Arnim Zola. Zola grants him the leadership of some Hydra soldiers to work for him in arranging the destruction of Parker Industries. With Hydra's help, he creates a new uniform for himself, becoming the Superior Octopus, intending to wait for Peter's actions to trigger the collapse of Parker Industries so that he can retake his position and prove himself superior once again.

==== "Secret Empire" ====
During the 2017 "Secret Empire" storyline, the Superior Octopus appears as a leader of Hydra's Avengers. Outside of his work with Hydra's Avengers, the Superior Octopus approached Spider-Man, where he wants him to transfer ownership of Parker Industries back to him. When Peter Parker declined this offer, the Superior Octopus had the Hydra agents in Parker Industries' London branch blow up the building. As Peter flees to the Shanghai branch of Parker Industries, Octavius attempts to implement various security protocols he had added to all Parker Industries tech that allows him to retake control of anything developed by the company, but Peter turns the tables on Octavius by ordering his employees to literally destroy the company to hurt Hydra, thwarting Octavius' attempt to shut down his new high-tech suit with an EMP by reverting to his traditional costume and turning the EMP trick against Octavius so that his own tentacles attack him. Octavius is forced to flee the battle.

==== "Spider-Geddon" ====
During the "Spider-Geddon" storyline, the Superior Octopus is seen fighting the Night Shift. The Superior Octopus agrees to spare them more pain in exchange for the Night Shift becoming his agents, where he will compensate them from his own funds. They agree to the terms and are ordered to return the stolen items. The Superior Octopus leaves, advising them never to cross him or they will not live long enough to regret it. After a day at Horizon University and saving some people on the Bay Bridge, the Superior Octopus fights Arnim Zola, a clone of Gorgon, and Hydra agents who seek to repossess his services to rebuild Hydra. The Superior Octopus states that he is done with his end of the bargain and attacks them. When Gorgon turns the Superior Octopus to stone and shatters him, another Superior Octopus body emerges, destroys Gorgon, and defeats Arnim Zola. Superior Octopus goes on to recruit Kaine and the Spider-Man of Earth-1048 to combat the Inheritors. After the Inheritors are defeated, Octavius resumes being the Superior Spider-Man.

=== The Superior Spider-Man (vol. 2) ===
After the events of "Spider-Geddon", Octavius resumes his career as the Superior Spider-Man, protecting San Francisco with the hired assistance of the Night Shift. His identity as Dr. Elliot Tolliver is uncovered by Anna Maria, who confronts him with the rebuilt Living Brain. This is interrupted by the appearance of Terrax. Using a machine to siphon a fraction of the Power Cosmic, Octavius defeats Terrax and passes out. While helping rebuild San Francisco and rescue survivors, the Octavius learns about humility and begins to connect with the people. Unbeknownst to him, Master Pandemonium emerges from the wreckage, planning to strike. When Master Pandemonium attacks, Octavius is forced to work with Doctor Strange to stop Pandemonium after he possesses his new associate Emma Hernandez.

During "The War of the Realms" storyline, the Superior Spider-Man worked to save the civilians from a Frost Giant invasion. Then he came up with the idea to work with the West Coast Avengers to make use of America Chavez's powers. After rescuing them with his Octavian Lens, the Superior Spider-Man barely convinced them to help fight the Asgardian invasion at the source. They would have to go to New York City, since the Asgardian magic is interfering with America's powers. In the midst of the battle between the Fantastic Four and Malekith the Accursed's forces, the Superior Spider-Man worked with Mister Fantastic to enable America Chavez to duplicate the Bifrost Bridge's energy. After the two of them failed to locate the strike team in Svartalfheim, the Superior Spider-Man and Mister Fantastic located the strike team in Jotunheim. Those in Jotunheim persuaded the Superior Spider-Man to focus on protecting Earth. The Superior Spider-Man returned to New York City to lead the West Coast Avengers in protecting the citizens. Once the War was over, Octavius confides that he feels guilty over being unable to save more people to Spider-Man, who comforts him. Unbeknownst to Octavius, he is being spied upon by one of the spiders that make up Spiders-Man on behalf of Spider-Osborn, who is planning revenge on him.

Following a date with Emma, they notice a news leak that claiming that the Superior Spider-Man is really Doctor Octopus. Thus is denied by Spider-Man, Mister Fantastic, and Doctor Strange, who note his involvement in fighting the Frost Giants. The next day, Octavius admits to Max Modell that he is a clone. However, Modell reveals that he already knew. Upon analyzing the security footage of the leak, Octavius deduces that Spiders-Man was responsible. Spiders-Man then attacks them, but is subdued, and states that Spider-Osborn is safe on his world and that they will never reach him. Octavius, Anna Maria, and the Living Brain attempt to use the cosmic energies left over from the fight with Terrax to travel to Spider-Osborne's world, but it goes wrong and causes an explosion. Spider-Osborn then appears, revealing that he was on Earth-616 all along. He beats Octavius, and reveals that he plans to kill everyone that he cares about as revenge for insulting him. Spider-Osborn starts by capturing James Martin, stating that he will release the boy only if Octavius kills three citizens on camera so that people will see him as a fraud.

Believing that he cannot win against Osborn, Octavius summons Mephisto and asks him to restore him to his original form for a day so that he can fight Spider-Osborn. Mephisto rejects this and offers to permanently restore Octavius to his original body, without any of "flaws". Octavius accepts the deal, once again becoming Doctor Octopus. He attacks The Brothers Grimm as they collect their payment, demanding the location of Spider-Osborn. Octavius then defeats Spider-Osborn, throwing him back to his world. After briefly visiting Anna Maria and Emma at the hospital, he reveals that he has lost all memory of Spider-Man's identity. He cuts ties with the Night Shift and leaves, leaving his Superior Spider-Man outfit in the garbage.

=== Return to Doctor Octopus ===
In the "Sinister War" storyline, Doctor Octopus coerces Curt Connors into using the Isotope Particle Accelerator on himself, making his Lizard persona a separate entity. While in the Osborn Graveyard, Doctor Octopus demands that Kindred gives him the answers he seeks. Kindred states to Doctor Octopus that he wil get the answers soon as he adds Mysterio to the latest incarnation to the Sinister Six. In truth, Doctor Octopus secretly prepares a sonic transducer to destroy Kindred's centipedes, at cost of knocking the rest of Spider-Man's past foes, while saving them as well from hunting Spider-Man before the centipedes devoured their brains. Doctor Octopus takes a centipede from Sin-Eater's brain and uses it on his transducer to both knock out and save Spider-Man's past foes, barring Spider-Man and himself, while Boomerang was killed by Morlun when trying to save Spider-Man. Before splitting up, Otto urges Peter to make himself scarce and continue to fight Kindred safely before the surviving factions could recover, as most of them would still want to kill him.

During the "Devil's Reign" storyline, Doctor Octopus joins Mayor Wilson Fisk's Thunderbolts unit. He accompanies the NYPD and Homeland Security to the Baxter Building to do a full investigation on the weapons of mass destruction that may be located there. Doctor Octopus later contacts Fisk about the inventions that he found in Reed Richards' lab. Doctor Octopus later makes use of Reed Richards' inter-dimensional gate to summon his counterparts from throughout the multiverse, consisting of a version of Hulk from Earth-8816 who has two sets of arms growing from his back, a version of Ghost Rider from Earth-1666 with chain-tentacles coming out of his back, and a version of Wolverine from Earth-9712 with bladed tentacles.

In flashbacks to when Doctor Octopus first operated as Superior Spider-Man, he had worked on a miniature star project with help from his hired assistant Estrella Lopez and how her trying to take the project after Superior Spider-Man took credit for solving it led to her being turned into a fiery form that she dubbed Supernova. This caused Superior Spider-Man to trap her in the dodecahedron. In the present, Doctor Octopus finds the dodecahedron while rummaging through his old lair. As he was working on his latest weapon using energy from the dodecahedron, Supernova breaks free from her imprisonment.

While Parker is fighting Supernova, Spider-Boy goes to Parker Labs and becomes infected Spiders-Man's remaining spiders. Using Spider-Boy's ability to communicate with other arachnids, they spread the hive mind throughout every resident of New York City, similar to Spider-Island. Spider-Boy takes on the persona, Superior Spider-Boy. Eventually Otto and Spider-Man trap Super Nova back in a new dodecahedron trap. Otto plans to sacrifice her to create an unlimited power source, to Parker's objection. Anna Maria pretends to be possessed by the hive mind, driving Otto to regret the entire plot and uses the neurolitic brain scanner to reverse the hive mind, but also erase his recent memories, which include him being Superior Spider-Man, trapping Estrella, and being in love with Anna Marconi. Super Nova decides not to exact revenge on Otto since he doesn't remember her, so killing him would be uneventful. Spider-Man lets Otto escape since he did save the city, but as he leaves he tells Anna Maria that he has no idea who she is, but she responds, "I have a pretty good idea who you are now".

==== Spider-Man: Octo-Girl ====
Beginning between the events of The Superior Spider-Man Volumes 2 & 3 (later overlapping with the events after Volume 3), Otto Octavius battles Spider-Man in New York City and slips to his death, so his AI attempts to swap his mind into a clone, but accidentally shares his consciousness with a young Japanese schoolgirl Otoha Okutamiya. He summons one of his harnesses to help Otaha with some of her school bullying and other adolescent issues, while also searching for his neurolitic brain scanner to return him to his body, which has been left in a coma-like state in New York City. They bump into other superheroes like Sakura Spider, magical girls, and a clone of Otto himself as Superior Octopus that doesn't recall the events after Superior Spider-Man Volume 2.. They come to a head with an evil corporation called Across that murdered Ohtana's friend's (Touma Taka) father. Touma creates a vulture suit with the help of Superior Octopus, who is trying to infiltrate Across Corporation's cyber security network. Otto reluctantly agrees to assist Ohtana in saving Touma from becoming a terrorist. After the cyberattack is stopped, Across decides to use this as an opportunity to test out their new "Vulture" attack drone system, so they two work together to defeat the drones. At the end of the third volume, Superior Octopus discovers that the drones are being controlled by a third Otto clone, who inhabited the body of Otto right before the events of Superior Spider-Man.

==== Black Panther: Intergalactic ====
In Black Panther: Intergalactic, another copy of Otto's unredeemed mind is transferred into an African clone body of his DNA combined with that of T'Challa instead of the one he had preferred (one of many created by B'Wete to serve as members of the Ebony Guard of the Wakandan Empire), and, on noticing his black reflection, Otto renames himself Otto Blacktavius, covering his robotic arms in a golden grill and going by Golden Arms.

== Powers and abilities ==
Otto Octavius is a scientist specializing in atomic physics and holds a PhD in nuclear science. He is also an engineer and inventor. His expertise in radiation led Mister Fantastic of the Fantastic Four to consult him when the Invisible Woman experienced complications during her second pregnancy related to the cosmic radiation that had given the team their powers.

Due to exposure to atomic radiation, Doctor Octopus has acquired the mental ability of psychokinetic control over the four electrically powered, telescoping, prehensile, titanium-steel artificial tentacle "arms" (a degree of psychokinetic control over them that he can also exercise over vast distances even when they are not connected to him) that are attached to a stainless-steel harness encompassing his lower torso. Each of these four arms is capable of lifting several tons, provided that at least one arm is used to support his body. The reaction time and agility of his mechanical appendages are enhanced far beyond the range attainable for normal human musculature. The arms allow Octavius to move rapidly over any terrain and to scale vertical surfaces and ceilings. He has developed his concentration and control to the point that he can engage a single opponent, like Spider-Man, or multiple opponents with the arms while performing a completely separate, more delicate task, such as stirring coffee or constructing a machine. Due to his weight and age, his opponents are often lured into a false sense of security, only to find he is a formidable combatant. He has managed to force opponents as formidable as Spider-Man, Daredevil, and Captain America to take up a defensive position in a fight.

Doctor Octopus has begun wearing a full-body armor suit due to an illness caused by the amount of punishment he has sustained over the years, made even worse by the fact that his ability to take damage is still at a human norm, even if he can deliver a superhuman level of punishment; he relies completely on his arms to prevent opponents with superhuman strength getting in close enough to damage his relatively unfit physical form even before his illness. To compensate, he has covered his entire body with his new suit, his normal arms are bound to his chest, and four additional tentacles have been added to his harness. He has also developed psychokinetic-telepathic control over an army of "Octobots" (small octopus-like drones).

=== Harnesses ===
Doctor Octopus has possessed a total of three different harnesses during his career: the original titanium harness, a more powerful adamantium harness, and a carbonadium harness with tentacles bearing an octopus-like motif. The titanium and adamantium harnesses were both destroyed in The Lethal Foes of Spider-Man #1-4.

His current harness is made of a titanium-steel-niobium alloy mixture that is dense, but lightweight in composition. While wearing the harness, the arms are powerful enough to allow him to walk up sheer concrete walls and move about quickly. They are also used to grab items, both small and large, and as literal weapons in terms of being swung at objects and people like clubs. The pincers at the end of each tentacle can also be used to cut and tear into the flesh of his enemies. His sheer power using these appendages was great enough to beat Daredevil, a seasoned combatant with superhuman senses, almost to death.

The adamantium harness was powerful enough to both restrain and pummel the Hulk into submission during a series written by Erik Larsen. The adamantium in his tentacles made besting Iron Man in combat possible, tearing the hero's armor apart with a defeat so harsh that Tony Stark began to doubt his abilities almost enough to allow his persistent problem with alcohol abuse to flare up. The harness is also capable of holding a small jetpack, allowing him to fly to places faster and able to evade Spider-Man more easily. Doctor Octopus is even capable of whirling his tentacles around to deflect small projectiles like bullets.

=== Powers as the Superior Spider-Man ===
With his mind having taken over Spider-Man's body, Octavius gains possession of all of Spider-Man's memories, powers, abilities, and equipment, although he loses access to Spider-Man's memories after apparently removing his foe from their shared mind. As a way to reaffirm his perceived superior mind, he tinkered with the original Spider-Man costume, adding some carbonadium plating over his neck and skull, talons on his hands and feet, split-toed footwear fashioned as jika-tabi shoes, a slightly different, more imposing spider-motif on his back and enhanced lenses in his costume, with HUD and tracking abilities.

He also retains access to some of his former hideouts from when he was Doctor Octopus, coupling Horizon Tech-derived inventions with his own peculiar brand of technology.

=== Octobots ===
The Octobots are octopus-themed robots that are created by Doctor Octopus. There are two different kinds of Octobots:

- The first model of the Octobot seen are little metal balls with eight legs, which are mentally controlled by Doctor Octopus via a remote control. These Octobots can also be used to attack, to perform different tasks, and attach themselves to anyone so that Doctor Octopus can mentally control them.
- The second model of the Octobot seen is a giant metallic robot, which Doctor Octopus uses to attack huge constructions.

The Octobots have at least two known variations:

- The Spider-Slayers – These Spider-Slayers that appeared in Spider-Island are actually first generation Octobots that Spider-Man had laden with a special serum, which was used to cure the Spider-Virus that slowly turned everyone into Man-Spiders.
- The Spider-Bots – The Spider-Bots are small red and blue spiders. While his mind was inside Spider-Man's body, he controlled them remotely and was able to enact constant surveillance over all of New York city, perform different tasks and control technology.
- The Ocktoids are smaller Octobots that Doctor Octopus created in light of having created a new set of tentacles.

=== Powers as the Superior Octopus ===
In his Superior Octopus body, Octavius retains access to Peter Parker's powers, while also having a new set of his original tentacles designed to work with this body.

== Other characters called Doctor Octopus ==
There have been other characters who have gone by the name of Doctor Octopus:

=== Carolyn Trainor ===
Carolyn Trainor became the second Doctor Octopus following the death of Otto Octavius. When he returned from the dead, Carolyn rebranded herself as Lady Octopus.

=== Luke Carlyle ===
Luke Carlyle once operated as Doctor Octopus with a makeshift version of Doctor Octopus' tentacles after having once used Doctor Octopus' services.

=== Olivia Octavius ===
An alternate future of Doctor Octopus named Olivia Octavius (based on the Olivia "Liv" Octavius from Spider-Man: Into the Spider-Verse) appears in the "One World Under Doom" storyline. This version is the daughter of Otto Octavius, originating from a possible future designated as Chrono Signature Anno Doom +128 and is a member of the Superior Avengers. Olivia is later killed by Annihilus.

== Reception ==
- In 2022, Screen Rant ranked Superior Spider-Man 5th in their "10 Most Powerful Silk Villains In Marvel Comics" list.

== Other versions ==
Many alternate universe versions of Doctor Octopus have appeared throughout the character's publication history:

=== Amalgam Comics ===
In the Amalgam Comics universe, Octo-Marauder is a Project Cadmus scientist and mentor to Spider-Boy.

=== Marvel 1602 ===
In Marvel 1602, Doctor Octopus is Baron Victor Octavius, an Italian nobleman who transformed himself into an octopus-like monster while attempting to cure the bubonic plague.

=== Marvel 2099 ===
In Marvel 2099, an unidentified 2099 successor to Otto Octavius as Doctor Octopus is an Atlantean scientist who possesses octopus tentacles.

=== Marvel Noir ===
In the Marvel Noir universe, Otto Octavius is a crippled South African-Jewish scientist who by 1933, uses his mechanical arms to aid his mobility and move his wheelchair, funded by the Friends of New Germany to enact mind control experiments on black test subjects provided to him by the Crime Master. After being defeated by Spider-Man Noir, Octavius defects to Nazi Germany only to find himself considered a second-class citizen and his work ignored after the Nazi Party finds out what he actually looks like. Octavius then returns to New York, gaining followers and taking over new minds.

=== Spider-Man: Life Story ===
In Spider-Man: Life Story, Doctor Octopus swapped bodies with Miles Morales instead of Peter Parker, living as Miles Morales / Spider-Man III for years in an adaptation of the "Dying Wish" and The Superior Spider-Man storylines, before being convinced to undo the switch.

=== Ultimate Marvel ===
In the Ultimate Marvel universe, Doctor Octopus's arms are controlled by him using nanotechnology, which gives him the ability to control metal. He is also behind the Ultimate Clone Saga, including the creation of the Ultimate Spider-Woman.

=== Ultimate Universe ===
In the Ultimate Universe imprint, Otto Octavius (physically designed after the mainstream Elliot Tolliver design) is an Oscorp employee who helped Harry Osborn create the Green Goblin armor, and becomes the third Spider-Man.

== In other media ==
=== Television ===
- Doctor Octopus appears in Spider-Man (1967), voiced by Vernon Chapman. This version captures Spider-Man after he accidentally stumbles upon Doctor Octopus's hideout whilst the villain was planning to set off explosives, before Spider-Man escapes and defeat him. Doctor Octopus later steals the Ultimate Nullifier from Dr. Smartyr, declaring himself the Master of Space, before defeats him and recovers the Nullifier.
- Doctor Octopus appears in the Spider-Man (1981) episode "Bubble, Bubble, Oil and Trouble", voiced by G. Stanley Jones.
- Doctor Octopus appears in The Incredible Hulk episode "Tomb of the Unknown Hulk", voiced by Michael Bell.
- Doctor Octopus appears in the Spider-Man and His Amazing Friends episode "Spidey Meets the Girl of Tomorrow", voiced again by Michael Bell.
- Doctor Octopus appears in Spider-Man: The Animated Series, voiced by Efrem Zimbalist Jr. This version sports a German accent and was Peter Parker's teacher at science camp when the latter was a child. Despite having turned to villainy years later, Octavius still refers to himself as Parker's teacher following their reunion. Throughout the series, he battles Spider-Man while serving as a member of the Kingpin's Insidious Six.
- Otto Octavius / Doctor Octopus appears in The Spectacular Spider-Man, voiced by Peter MacNicol. This version is initially a timid, weak-willed scientist and inventor at Oscorp. Following a lab accident caused by the Green Goblin, Octavius is fused with his tentacle harness and becomes more aggressive and violent. After being defeated by Spider-Man, he forms the Sinister Six to seek revenge against him, only to be defeated by the symbiote-possessed Spider-Man. In the second season, Octavius adopts the Master Planner alias as he re-forms the Sinister Six and attempts to take over the world by hacking into the FBI's servers, only to be thwarted by Spider-Man. He later competes with Tombstone and Silvermane for control of New York's criminal underworld until all three are defeated by Spider-Man.
- Otto Octavius / Doctor Octopus appears in Ultimate Spider-Man, voiced by Tom Kenny. This version was an Oscorp scientist who was left paralyzed and entirely dependent on four mechanical tentacles built by Norman Osborn following a lab accident. Throughout the first season, Octavius primarily operates from the shadows, employing supervillains to capture Spider-Man for his DNA on Norman's behalf; with one of his experiments with Spider-Man's DNA leading to the Venom symbiote's creation. Octavius eventually betrays Norman by forcibly turning him into the Green Goblin and escapes after his underwater lab is destroyed. In the second season, Octavius forms the Sinister Six in an attempt to eliminate Spider-Man, only to be defeated. After making minor appearances in the third season, Octavius returns in the fourth season, having allied with Hydra to form a new iteration of the Sinister Six and create the synthezoid Scarlet Spider to serve as a spy within Spider-Man's team. While leading an attack on the Triskelion, Octavius discovers Spider-Man's secret identity, but is betrayed by Scarlet Spider, who foils his plan. Octavius later reclaims his nanotech and gives himself a younger body before reforming the Sinister Six once more and taking Spider-Man's allies hostage. However, Spider-Man defeats the Sinister Six and persuades Octavius to surrender.
  - Additionally, two alternate reality versions of Octavius, a medieval version called the Alchemist and a Wild West outlaw called Doc Ock Holliday, appear in the episodes "The Spider-Verse" and "Return to the Spider-Verse", both also voiced by Tom Kenny.
  - The same incarnation of Doctor Octopus returns in the Hulk and the Agents of S.M.A.S.H. episode "The Venom Inside", voiced again by Tom Kenny.
- Doctor Octopus appears in Lego Marvel Super Heroes: Maximum Overload, voiced again by Tom Kenny.
- Doctor Octopus appears in Marvel Disk Wars: The Avengers, voiced by Dai Matsumoto in the original Japanese version and by Dave Wittenberg in the English dub.
- Otto Octavius / Doctor Octopus appears in Spider-Man (2017), voiced by Scott Menville. This version is an arrogant but brilliant 19-year-old prodigy who was picked on by a jock and abused by his father Torbert while growing up. Introduced in the first season, Octavius works as a professor at Horizon High until his tentacle harness becomes fused to his spine following a lab accident caused by the Crimson Dynamo. Following this, he tries to use his newfound abilities to become a superhero under Spider-Man's guidance until his ego eventually causes him to become a supervillain and form the Sinister Six, though they are defeated by Spider-Man and Harry Osborn / Hobgoblin. In the second season, Octavius is released from prison, claiming that he wants to redeem himself, and returns to being a professor at Horizon High. However, he secretly places a bounty on Spider-Man. After being defeated, Octavius is left in a coma and his consciousness temporarily ends up in the Living Brain before relocating into Spider-Man's body. During this time, Octavius is inspired by the hero's memories to become the Superior Spider-Man and befriends Midtown High chemistry teacher Anna Maria Marconi. Eventually, he is persuaded to allow Spider-Man to reclaim control of his body while he returns to his own comatose body once more. After he recovers, Octavius returns to his Doctor Octopus persona and sacrifices himself to stop the Goblin King, for which he is hailed as a hero.
- Doctor Octopus appears in Marvel Super Hero Adventures, voiced by Luc Roderique.
- Doctor Octopus appears in Lego Marvel Spider-Man: Vexed by Venom, voiced by Robbie Daymond.
- A female incarnation of Doctor Octopus appears in Spidey and His Amazing Friends, voiced by Kelly Ohanian.
- Otto Octavius / Doctor Octopus appears in Your Friendly Neighborhood Spider-Man, voiced by Hugh Dancy.

=== Film ===
- In an early script for Cannon's aborted Spider-Man film, written by Ted Newsom and John Brancato, Otto Octavius was rewritten to become a teacher and mentor to a college-aged Peter Parker. The cyclotron accident which "creates" Spider-Man also deforms the scientist into Doctor Octopus and results in his mad pursuit of proof of the Fifth Force. "Doc Ock" reconstructs his cyclotron and causes electromagnetic abnormalities, anti-gravity effects, and bi-location, which threatens to engulf New York City and the world. Additionally, Bob Hoskins and Arnold Schwarzenegger were considered for the role.
- Director Sam Raimi has stated that Doctor Octopus was intended to appear in Spider-Man (2002) and team up with the Green Goblin, but was not included because Raimi thought it "wouldn't do the movie justice to have a third origin in there".
- Otto Octavius / Doctor Octopus appears in the Sony film Spider-Man 2 (2004), portrayed by Alfred Molina. This version is a sympathetic, but misguided individual, and the husband and lab partner of Rosie Octavius (portrayed by Donna Murphy). Initially a well-meaning scientist working with Oscorp to develop a form of self-sustainable energy to benefit mankind, Octavius turns to villainy after his experiment goes wrong, resulting in Rosie's death and Octavius losing control of his tentacle harness' artificial intelligence, which begins to influence his mind and actions and brings him into conflict with Spider-Man. With the web-slinger's help, Octavius eventually sees the error of his ways and sacrifices himself to sink a fusion reactor he built into the East River, where he drowns.
  - Octavius appears in the Marvel Cinematic Universe (MCU) film Spider-Man: No Way Home, portrayed again by Alfred Molina. In April 2021, Molina said it was "wonderful" to play the character again. Additionally, he was digitally de-aged in the film to better resemble how he appeared in 2004, despite his concerns about his fighting style not looking realistic due to his age. Prior to his death, Octavius is transported to an alternate universe due to a magic spell gone wrong and receives a cure from an alternate universe version of Spider-Man before being returned to his native universe.
- A female incarnation of Doctor Octopus named Dr. Olivia "Liv" Octavius appears in Spider-Man: Into the Spider-Verse, voiced by Kathryn Hahn. She is the head scientist of Alchemax and the Kingpin's right-hand woman who sports a large beehive hairstyle, glasses with octagonal lenses, and pneumatic tentacles tipped with claws. Under the Kingpin's orders, she builds a super-collider to access parallel universes. In spite of the initial tests nearly destroying New York City and bringing several alternate reality versions of Spider-Man to their universe, the Kingpin orders Liv to continue working on the collider. She later encounters Miles Morales and an alternate reality Peter Parker while they are infiltrating Alchemax, but fails to catch them. After confronting the assembled Spider-People at May Parker's house alongside the Kingpin and his other henchmen and failing to stop them a second time, Liv tries to stop the heroes at the collider, only to be hit by a truck when the machine goes haywire and melds her universe with aspects of others.
  - Additionally, a Doctor Octopus from Gwen Stacy's universe makes a non-speaking cameo appearance in a flashback.
  - Otto Octavius as the Superior Spider-Man and a comic book-accurate Doctor Octopus make non-speaking cameo appearances in Spider-Man: Across the Spider-Verse as prisoners of Spider-Man 2099's Spider-Society. Additionally, Liv Octavius appears via archival footage while archival recordings of Alfred Molina are used for other versions of Octavius, who make minor appearances.

=== Video games ===
==== Spider-Man games ====
- Doctor Octopus appears in Questprobe featuring Spider-Man.
- Doctor Octopus appears as a boss in The Amazing Spider-Man (1990).
- Doctor Octopus appears in Spider-Man: The Video Game.
- Doctor Octopus appears as the final boss of Spider-Man: Return of the Sinister Six (1992). This version is the leader of the titular team.
- Doctor Octopus appears as a boss in Spider-Man vs. The Kingpin.
- Doctor Octopus appears as a boss in Spider-Man (1995).
- Doctor Octopus appear in Spider-Man: The Sinister Six, voiced by Ken Roberts.
- Doctor Octopus appears as a boss in Spider-Man: Lethal Foes.
- Doctor Octopus appears as a boss in Spider-Man (2000), voiced again by Efrem Zimbalist Jr. While pretending to have reformed, he works with Carnage to turn everyone in New York into symbiotes, but they are both defeated by Spider-Man. Following this, the Carnage symbiote bonds with Doctor Octopus, turning him into Monster-Ock (voiced by Marcus Shirock). After Monster-Ock is defeated, Doctor Octopus is returned to normal and promptly arrested.
- Doctor Octopus appears as the final boss of Spider-Man 2: The Sinister Six. This version is a member of the Sinister Six.
- Doctor Octopus makes a cameo appearance in Spider-Man 2: Enter Electro.
- Doctor Octopus appears as the final boss of the Spider-Man 2 film tie-in game, voiced by Alfred Molina.
- Doctor Octopus appears as a boss and playable character in Spider-Man: Friend or Foe, voiced by Joe Alaskey. He and several supervillains attack Spider-Man until they are all attacked by P.H.A.N.T.O.M.s under Mysterio's command. Doc Ock is captured along with the other villains, placed under mind control, and sent to Tokyo to retrieve a meteor shard located there. After Spider-Man defeats Doctor Octopus and destroys the mind-control device, the latter joins forces with the former to exact revenge on Mysterio.
- Otto Octavius appears in Spider-Man: Edge of Time, voiced by Dave B. Mitchell. Alchemax scientist Walker Sloan travels back from the year 2099 to establish his company in the 1970s, saving Octavius from the accident that would have fused his tentacle harness to him and recruiting him in the process. Despite having never turned to crime, Octavius still uses his tentacles as research tools. The pair attempt to use a mind-controlled Anti-Venom to kill Spider-Man, but when Spider-Man 2099 intervenes, Doctor Octopus, Sloan, and Anti-Venom are all accidentally thrown into Sloan's time portal and end up fused into the monstrous Atrocity (voiced by Fred Tatasciore) equipped with Doctor Octopus' tentacles and Anti-Venom's ability to negate the present day Spider-Man's powers. Spider-Man eventually defeats Atrocity, throwing it back into the time portal, before he and Spider-Man 2099 undo Sloan's changes, restoring history.
- Multiple alternate reality versions of Doctor Octopus appear as bosses in Spider-Man Unlimited, voiced by Kyle Hebert. They are members of a multiversal Sinister Six. Additionally, Octavius as the Superior Spider-Man, Superior Venom, and Superior Octopus appear as playable characters.

==== Marvel's Spider-Man series ====
Otto Octavius appears in Insomniac Games' Marvel's Spider-Man series, voiced by William Salyers. Once a close friend of Norman Osborn and co-founder of Oscorp, this version left the company due to its unethical genetic experiments. Founding his own company, Octavius Industries, he worked to perfect prosthetic limb technology, motivated by a neurological disorder he was developing. Octavius later employed Peter Parker, whom he mentored, as his lab assistant and eventually became aware of his activities as Spider-Man, but chose to hide this from him.

- First appearing as the final boss of Marvel's Spider-Man (2018), Octavius gains support from A.I.M. after Norman exploits his position as mayor to remove Octavius' grant funding in an attempt to persuade him to return to Oscorp. During this time, Octavius befriends Martin Li, a victim of Oscorp's experimentation who has been leading terrorist attacks against the city to destroy Norman, inspiring Octavius to pursue his own vendetta against his former friend. While working on a set of mechanical thought-controlled tentacles with Parker, Octavius loses control of his emotions due to a defect with the neural implant used to connect them directly to his nervous system and causes a mass prison break from Ryker's Island and the Raft. Forming the Sinister Six with Li and several of Spider-Man's foes, Octavius, now going by "Doctor Octopus", organizes a series of attacks on Oscorp-owned properties and releases their Devil's Breath virus on New York in the hopes of exposing Norman's crimes. After capturing and nearly killing Norman, Octavius is confronted by Parker as Spider-Man, who rescues Norman and battles Octavius atop Oscorp tower, during which the latter reveals his knowledge of Parker's double life. Following his defeat, Octavius pleads for help, claiming the tentacles' artificial intelligence was in control of his actions, but a heartbroken Parker leaves him to face justice for his crimes, leading to Octavius' imprisonment at the Raft and Octavius Industries being shut down.
- Octavius makes a cameo appearance in a flashback depicted in Spider-Man: Miles Morales.
- Octavius makes a cameo appearance in the mid-credits scene of Marvel's Spider-Man 2 (2023). Following the events of the main story, Norman visits his cell at the Raft to inquire about the Spider-Men's secret identities. Octavius taunts him with the belief that he needed to experience loss as he had while making preparations for the "final chapter". Additionally, the Superior Spider-Man's suit appears as an alternate skin for Peter.

==== Other games ====
- Doctor Octopus appears in LittleBigPlanet via the "Marvel Costume Kit 1" DLC.
- Doctor Octopus appears in Marvel Super Hero Squad Online, voiced initially by Charlie Adler, and later by Tom Kenny.
- Doctor Octopus appears as a support card in Ultimate Marvel vs. Capcom 3's "Heroes and Heralds Mode". Producer Ryota Niitsuma confirmed that Doctor Octopus was planned to be a playable character at one point during production, with character art and a theme song being developed for him, before the decision was made to cut him from the roster.
- Doctor Octopus appears as a boss in Marvel Avengers Alliance. This version is a member of the Sinister Six. Additionally, an alternate reality version who became the Superior Spider-Man appears as a playable character.
- Doctor Octopus appears as a boss in Marvel Heroes, voiced again by Tom Kenny. Additionally, the Superior Spider-Man appears as a playable character.
- Two incarnations of Doctor Octopus appear as playable characters in Marvel Puzzle Quest.
- Doctor Octopus appears as a playable character and boss in Lego Marvel Super Heroes, voiced by Dee Bradley Baker. Additionally, the Ultimate Spider-Man TV series incarnation and Octavius as the Superior Spider-Man appear as playable characters.
- Doctor Octopus make a cameo appearance in Disney Infinity 2.0, voiced again by Tom Kenny.
- Doctor Octopus appears in Marvel: Contest of Champions as a member of the Sinister Six.
- Doctor Octopus appears as a playable character and boss in Marvel: Future Fight. Additionally, the Superior Spider-Man appears as an alternate costume.
- Doctor Octopus appears as a boss in Marvel Avengers Alliance 2.
- Doctor Octopus appears as a boss and playable character in Lego Marvel Super Heroes 2. Additionally, the Superior Spider-Man appears as a playable character.
- Doctor Octopus appears in Marvel Strike Force as a member of the Sinister Six.
- Doctor Octopus appears as a boss in Marvel Ultimate Alliance 3: The Black Order, voiced again by William Salyers. This version serves as second-in-command of the Sinister Six, led by the Green Goblin.
- Otto Octavius as Doctor Octopus and the Superior Spider-Man appears in Marvel Snap.

=== Miscellaneous ===
Cover of Spider-Man: Octo-Girl Vol. 1.

- Doctor Octopus appears in The Amazing Adventures of Spider-Man, voiced by Rodger Bumpass. This version is the leader of the Sinister Syndicate.
- Doctor Octopus appears in Marvel Universe: LIVE! as a member of the Sinister Six.
- Doctor Octopus appears in the Spider-Verse manga Spider-Man: Octo-Girl, in which he ends up in the body of Japanese middle schooler Otoha Okutamiya.
- Doctor Octopus appears in the BBC's Spider-Man radio drama adaptation, voiced by Simon Treves.

=== Merchandise ===
- Doctor Octopus received a figure in Mattel's "Secret Wars" line.
- Doctor Octopus received several figures in Toy Biz's Spider-Man and Marvel Legends series.
- Doctor Octopus received a figure in Hasbro's Spider-Man: Origin series.
- Alfred Molina's incarnation of Doctor Octopus received a figure in Hasbro's Marvel Legends: Spider-Man line.
- The Spectacular Spider-Man incarnation of Doctor Octopus received a figure from Hasbro.
- Doctor Octopus received a figure in the Marvel Manga Twist'ems line.
- Doctor Octopus received several statues and mini-busts from Diamond Select Toys, Art Asylum and Bowen Designs.
- Doctor Octopus received a figurine in The Classic Marvel Figurine Collection.

== Collected editions ==
=== As Doctor Octopus ===
Title	Material Collected	Published Date	ISBN
Spider-Man vs. Doctor Octopus	Amazing Spider-Man (vol.1) #3, 130–131, Amazing Spider-Man Annual #15, Marvel Tales #38–41	April 1, 2000	9780785107422
Spider-Man/Doctor Octopus: Negative Exposure	Spider-Man/Doctor Octopus: Negative Exposure #1–5	June 1, 2004	978-0785113300
Spider-Man/Doctor Octopus: Out of Reach	Spider-Man/Doctor Octopus: Out of Reach #1–5	June 1, 2004	978-0785113607
Spider-Man/Doctor Octopus: Year One	Spider-Man/Doctor Octopus: Year One #1–5	February 12, 2019	978-1302915452
Devil's Reign: Superior Four	Devil's Reign: Superior Four #1–3 and Devil's Reign: Spider-Man #1	May 31, 2022	978-1302945893
Spider-Man: Octo-Girl	Spider-Man: Octopus Girl (vol. 1) #1–6	October 8, 2024	978-1974749911

=== As Superior Spider-Man ===
Title	Material Collected	Published Date	ISBN
Superior Spider-Man Vol. 1: My Own Worst Enemy	Superior Spider-Man #1–5	June 11, 2013	978-0785167044
Superior Spider-Man Vol. 2: A Troubled Mind	Superior Spider-Man #6–10	September 3, 2013	978-0785167051
Superior Spider-Man Vol. 3: No Escape	Superior Spider-Man #11–16	December 9, 2013	978-1846535567
Superior Spider-Man Vol. 4: Necessary Evil	Superior Spider-Man #17–21	January 15, 2014	978-1846535819
Superior Spider-Man Vol. 5: Superior Venom	Superior Spider-Man #22–26	April 16, 2014	978-1846535840
Superior Spider-Man Vol. 6: Goblin Nation	Superior Spider-Man #27–31, Superior Spider-Man Annual #2	June 18, 2014	978-1846536021
Superior Spider-Man: The Complete Collection Vol. 1	Amazing Spider-Man #698–700, Superior Spider-Man #1–16	April 25, 2018	978-1302909505
Superior Spider-Man: The Complete Collection Vol. 2	Superior Spider-Man #17–31, Superior Spider-Man Annual #1–2	September 11, 2018	978-1302911836
Superior Spider-Man Omnibus	Amazing Spider-Man #698–700, Superior Spider-Man #1–31, Superior Spider-Man Annual #1–2	May 16, 2023	978-1302951078
Amazing Spider-Man Vol. 2: Spider-Verse Prelude	Superior Spider-Man #32–33, Amazing Spider-Man (vol. 3) #7–8 and material from Free Comic Book Day 2014 Guardians of the Galaxy	January 7, 2014	978-0785187981
Superior Spider-Man Team-Up: Superiority Complex	Avenging Spider-Man #15.1, 16–19	July 27, 2013	978-0785165361
Superior Spider-Man Team-Up: Friendly Fire	Avenging Spider-Man #20–22, Superior Spider-Man Annual #1 and Daredevil (vol. 3) #22.	January 21, 2014	978-0785166511
Superior Spider-Man Team-Up: Versus	Superior Spider-Man Team-Up #1–4 and Scarlet Spider (vol. 2) #20	February 26, 2014	978-0785187912
Superior Spider-Man Team-Up: Superior Six	Superior Spider-Man Team-Up #5–12	July 8, 2014	978-0785189794
All-New X-Men/Indestructible Hulk/Superior Spider-Man: The Arms of the Octopus	Superior Spiderman Team-up Special #1 and All-New X-Men Special #1, Indestructible Hulk Special #1, Wolverine: In The Flesh #1.	January 21, 2014	978-0785184386
Superior Spider-Man Companion	Avenging Spider-Man #15.1, 16–22, Superior Spider-Man Team-Up #1–12, Scarlet Spider (vol. 2) #20; Inhumanity: Superior Spider-Man #1, Daredevil (vol. 3) #22	January 3, 2019	978-1302915438
Superior Spider-Man Vol. 1: Full Otto	Superior Spider-Man (vol. 2) #1–6	July 30, 2019	978-1302914806
Superior Spider-Man Vol. 2: Otto-Matic	Superior Spider-Man (vol. 2) #7–12	January 7, 2020	978-1302914813
Spider-Man: Octo-Girl	Spider-Man: Octopus Girl (vol. 1) #1–6	October 8, 2024	978-1974749911

=== As Superior Octopus ===
Title	Material Collected	Published Date	ISBN
Edge of Spider-Geddon	Superior Octopus #1 and Edge of Spider-Geddon #1–4	January 15, 2019	978-1302914745

=== As Octo-Girl ===
#	Title	Material collected	Format	Pages	Released	ISBN
Trade Paperbacks
1	The Genius Scientist and the School Girl	Spider-Man Octo-Girl #1–7	TPB	200	May 2025	978-1974754762
2	Assailant	Spider-Man Octo-Girl #8–16, bonus manga The Marvels	TPB	200	May 2025	978-1974754762
3	Tower Attack	Spider-Man Octo-Girl #17–25	TPB	192	Nov 2025	978-1974758463
