= Spider-Man: Life Story =

Comic book series published by Marvel Comics

Publication information
- Publisher: Marvel Comics
- Schedule: Monthly
- Format: Miniseries
- Publication date: March – August 2019
- No. of issues: 6
- Main character: Peter Parker / Spider-Man

Creative team
- Written by: Chip Zdarsky
- Penciller: Mark Bagley
- Inker: John Dell
- Colorist: Frank D'Armata

Spider-Man: Life Story is a six-issue comic book miniseries published by Marvel Comics in 2019. Written by Chip Zdarsky with art by Mark Bagley, the story follows Spider-Man in the alternate universe of Earth-19529, in which the events in the Marvel Universe from 1961 to 2019 place in real time, the timeline lightly diverging in parts, following Peter Parker from ages 15 to 73. The series was made in celebration of Marvel Comics' 80th anniversary. Spider-Man: Life Story received critical acclaim, both for its emotional weight and willingness to age the Spider-Man character.

A complementary series set in its own continuity, Fantastic Four: Life Story, was published in 2021, while a direct spin-off/epilogue, Spider-Man: Life Story Annual, exploring the life and final days of the continuity's J. Jonah Jameson, was also published in 2021, and republished along with the original miniseries as Spider-Man: Life Story Extra.

== Overview ==
Each issue loosely covers pivotal events in Spider-Man's history in the decade which they debuted, starting with the 1960s and ending in the 2010s. For example, issue #3, which is set during the 1980s, has alternate takes on the 1980s storylines Secret Wars, the origin of Venom, and Kraven's Last Hunt.

== Plot summary ==
=== Chapter One: The War at Home (The '60s) ===
In 1966, four years have passed since Peter became Spider-Man. With many soldiers and superheroes being drafted or volunteering for the war in Vietnam, Peter wonders if he should help on the frontlines or not, especially after learning his former high school bully Flash Thompson was inspired to volunteer from Spider-Man's actions. At Flash's goodbye party, Norman Osborn reveals he knows Peter's secret identity and challenges him to a fight as the Green Goblin. Norman is defeated and suffers amnesia from the battle, but Peter is worried about him remembering at any moment. He later helps Captain America fight criminals and talks to him about his conflicted feelings towards the war. Steve tells him he shows enough responsibility helping people in New York and to let his heart guide him, inspiring Peter to send an anonymous tip to the police to have Norman arrested and prevent him from hurting anyone as the Goblin. While overseeing Norman's arrest, he ends up being late to see Flash off at the train station. When his girlfriend Gwen Stacy confronts him about it, she ends up discovering his secret as he accidentally left his shirt open, revealing his Spider-Man costume. A year later at Vietnam, Captain America protects a Vietnamese village from a group of American soldiers.

=== Chapter Two: Our Father's Way (The '70s) ===
By 1977, Peter is married to Gwen and works at Future Foundation with Reed Richards and Otto Octavius (who reformed after having a heart attack and married Aunt May) while Gwen works as Chief Biologist at Miles Warren's bio-engineering company. He ends up quitting as he continued to clash with Reed over how they could use their powers and resources to help humanity. Harry Osborn becomes CEO of Oscorp and develops a drug addiction as he tries to save the company from recession and is pressured by his father to interfere with a secret project related to his Green Goblin activities. When Peter meets up with Harry's fiancée, Mary Jane Watson, at a club and worries about their relationship, she reveals she knows he's Spider-Man and drunkenly chastises him for failing to save Flash from dying in Vietnam. After learning about Peter's secret from his father, Harry becomes the Black Goblin and attacks Warren at his company, revealing that Warren has developed clones of Norman, Peter, and Gwen. Harry realizes Norman cloned Peter because Norman still considered Peter the more worthy heir and attacks him. After Peter convinces Harry of his father's insanity, Harry blows up the facility, killing all the clones except Peter's. However, Miles reveals that the "Gwen" Peter was with was actually her clone while the real Gwen died in the explosion. A year later, Peter and Gwen's clones rename themselves as Ben and Helen and move out of New York for a second chance at life while Harry disappears and leaves Mary Jane with millions. Peter is upset that he has nothing after everything that has happened, but Mary Jane stays behind to comfort him.

=== Chapter Three: Our Secret Wars (The '80s) ===
In 1984, having since married Mary Jane, Peter returns to Earth after fighting alongside other heroes in Battleworld and gaining an alien symbiote costume. During his absence, Mary Jane gave birth to their twins, Benjamin and Claire Parker, and tensions between the U.S. and Russia escalated to the point where Russia sent an intangible nuclear missile that decimates Allentown, Pennsylvania (which was redirected by Vision to avoid hitting Manhattan). While working with Peter's new company, Parker Industries, at the damage site, Reed warns him that his costume is alive, but Peter chooses to keep it and use it sparingly due to his aging body. At home, he argues with Mary Jane over putting May in a senior's home as she displays signs of dementia and looking after his family. He leaves with his classic costume to get some air before confronting Kraven the Hunter, who's been impersonating him and attacking criminals. Kraven manages to drug Spider-Man and seemingly shoots him to death. After he is buried in a grave, the symbiote breaks out of Parker Industries to help him escape. An enraged Peter corners Kraven and threatens to kill him, but lets Mary Jane use his sonic gun to separate him from the symbiote. The traumatic event causes Mary Jane to leave and take the twins with her while Peter watches over May and his company. Kraven is satisfied with Spider-Man becoming the new hunter and prepares to kill himself, but the Venom symbiote bonds with him before he pulls the trigger.

=== Chapter Four: Brothers in Arms (The '90s) ===
In 1995, the middle-aged Peter is busy preventing Tony Stark from taking over Parker Industries and dating Jessica Jones. Shortly after May's death, Doctor Octopus learns Peter's secret and takes him and Ben Reilly to Oscorp to figure out a way to clone his body and extend his life. While using Harry's equipment, Otto discovers that Peter is supposedly the clone while Ben is the original. When Ben lashes out at the revelation, Otto attempts to kill them, but leaves in horror as Harry sacrifices himself to save Peter. Peter gives Ben a folder detailing his own life from the last 20 years and allows him the opportunity to retake his life as "Peter Parker" once more. Shortly afterwards, Peter breaks up with Jessica and confronts Norman in his hideout in New Jersey and reveals he figured out Norman was the one who told Otto his and Ben's identities and rigged the results to make it appear that Peter was the clone when he was really the original. As he learns of Harry's death, Norman blames Peter for the incident and tries to attack him, but ends up dying of a heart attack. Peter moves to Portland to live a quiet life with Mary Jane and his children.

=== Chapter Five: Civic Engagement (The 2000s) ===
In 2006, Ben is murdered by Morlun amidst the civil war going on between heroes that resulted from Tony Stark's Superhuman Registration Act. Claire encourages Peter to return to New York as Spider-Man to battle the vampire and stop Stark from taking over his company. After Peter reveals the truth about himself and Ben to Betty Brant and allows the Daily Bugle to run the story, Tony confronts him at Parker Industries and attacks him with the U.S. Avengers after he refuses to register. He is assisted by Captain America and other unregistered heroes, giving him time to don one of his new Spider-Man armors that allows him to defeat the U.S. Avengers by exposing a failsafe that Tony put in their armors. Spider-Man joins the Anti-Registration Avengers to follow his daughter's advice on leaving the world a better place for future generations. During Peter's fight with Tony, Morlun attacks the Parker residence in Oregon. Benjamin figures out that the vampire is vulnerable when he's feeding on someone, so he uses himself as bait to allow Claire the chance to kill the vampire on a splintered piece of wood. Benjamin survives the ordeal but is crippled for life.

=== Chapter Six: All My Enemies (The 2010s) ===
By 2019, Doctor Doom has taken over the planet as the heroes were too busy fighting each other. With most of the original heroes dead or missing, the elderly Peter becomes the new leader of the resistance. He and the new Spider-Man, Miles Morales, travel in one of Doom's moon shuttles into space to activate one of Tony's devices on his old satellite lab: a "Doomsday Pulse" that would disable Doom's technology across the planet. On the satellite, they are attacked by Kraven, still possessing the symbiote. After Peter separates the symbiote from Kraven's corpse, he deduces that "Miles" is actually Otto Octavius, who used Doom's technology to switch bodies with the younger would-be Spider-Man after he was bitten by a spider of Octavius' design. Octavius attempts to destroy Peter's mind, but Peter uses a memory of Aunt May to convince him to accept his life's limitations. As the satellite falls apart, Peter stays behind to ensure the pulse activates as he sends Otto back to Earth and encourages him to give Miles his body back. With help from the symbiote, he manages to hold the ship together and activate the pulse before the ship explodes and kills them both. Weeks later, Miles is back in his original body as Octavius did what Peter told him to do, but finds it hard to continue as Spider-Man after what Octavius did in his body. Mary Jane encourages him to get a "fresh start" by giving him Peter's original costume.

=== Annual ===
The storyline was continued in an annual issue, which focused on J. Jonah Jameson's life in this continuity. In 1966, Jameson is arrested by George Stacy for his involvement in the Scorpion's creation. He befriends Norman Osborn and begins writing a memoir. His vendetta against Spider-Man pushes away anyone close to him, including his son and Parker as he continues to insist the wall-crawler is a menace. During his prison term, he mostly confides with the prison therapist, Helen Carroll, who is Gwen's clone, trying to help other 'victims' of costumed heroes. He begins to slowly realize that Spider-Man wasn't responsible for the misfortunes in his life. In 2001, Jameson is finally released from prison and follows the deceased Norman's instructions to a warehouse, where he finds an upgraded version of the Spider-Slayer suit. Rather than get revenge on Spider-Man, he uses it to take out the Scorpion as he saw the villain as his greatest mistake. He dies shortly after killing Gargan. At his funeral, Helen gives Peter Jameson's completed memoir: Webs: Untangling A Life.

== Reception ==
| Issue # | Publication date | Critic rating | Critic reviews | Ref. |
|---|---|---|---|---|
| 1 | March 2019 | 8.1/10 | 20 | |
| 2 | April 2019 | 8.6/10 | 12 | |
| 3 | May 2019 | 8.2/10 | 10 | |
| 4 | June 2019 | 8.5/10 | 9 | |
| 5 | July 2019 | 7.5/10 | 8 | |
| 6 | August 2019 | 8.1/10 | 8 | |
| Overall | | 8.2/10 | 67 | |

== Collected editions ==
| Title | Material | Format | Pages | Out | ISBN |
|---|---|---|---|---|---|
| Spider-Man: Life Story | Spider-Man: Life Story #1–6 | TPB | 200 | Oct 22, 2019 | 978-1302917333 |
| Spider-Man: Life Story - Extra! | Spider-Man: Life Story #1-6; Annual (2021) | TPB | 240 | May 2, 2023 | 978-1302950019 |
| Spider-Man: Life Story | Spider-Man: Life Story #1-6; Annual (2021) | OHC | 240 | Dec 28, 2021 | 978-1302931919 |
| Spider-Man by Chip Zdarsky Omnibus | Spider-Man: Life Story #1–6, Annual (2021); Peter Parker: The Spectacular Spider-Man (vol. 3) #1–6, #297–310, Annual (2018); FCBD 2017: Secret Empire (Spider-Man story); Spider-Man: Life Story #1–6, Annual (2021); Spider-Man: Spider's Shadow #1–5 | Omnibus | 928 | Dec 12, 2023 | Adam Kubert cover: 978-1302952983 |
| Spider-Man by Chip Zdarsky Omnibus | Spider-Man: Life Story #1–6, Annual (2021); Peter Parker: The Spectacular Spider-Man (vol. 3) #1–6, #297–310, Annual (2018); FCBD 2017: Secret Empire (Spider-Man story); Spider-Man: Life Story #1–6, Annual (2021); Spider-Man: Spider's Shadow #1–5 | Omnibus | 928 | Dec 12, 2023 | Paulo Siqueira DM cover: 978-1302952990 |
| Spider-Man by Chip Zdarsky Omnibus | Spider-Man: Life Story #1–6, Annual (2021); Peter Parker: The Spectacular Spider-Man (vol. 3) #1–6, #297–310, Annual (2018); FCBD 2017: Secret Empire (Spider-Man story); Spider-Man: Life Story #1–6, Annual (2021); Spider-Man: Spider's Shadow #1–5 | Omnibus | 928 | Dec 12, 2023 | Chip Zdarsky DM cover: 978-1302955922 |
