= Ends of the Earth (Marvel Comics) =

Spider-Man comic book story line

- Preview for "Ends of the Earth" storyline that is an edited version of the cover for The Amazing Spider-Man #682. Art by Stefano Caselli.
- Publisher: Marvel Comics
- Publication date: March – June 2012
- Genre: Superhero
- Main character(s): Spider-Man; Otto Octavius; Sinister Six; Avengers

Creative team
- Writer: Dan Slott
- Penciller: Stefano Caselli
- Editor: Stephen Wacker

"Ends of the Earth" is a comic book storyline in The Amazing Spider-Man published by Marvel Comics in 2012. The villains of the story are the Sinister Six, who are led by Spider-Man's arch-enemy Doctor Octopus. Unlike the prior event story "Spider-Island" there is only one tie-in issue (a one-shot) instead of the multitude of tie-in issues involved with that story; the story is completely contained within issues #682–687 of The Amazing Spider-Man. The storyline received positive reviews, with critics praising the action, the plot, and the art style. The storyline leads directly into the ongoing series The Superior Spider-Man (2013–2014), and would further be followed upon in the manga series Spider-Man: Octo-Girl (2023–2025).

== Premise ==
The story is part of the celebration of the 50th anniversary of Spider-Man's first appearance. "Ends of the Earth" will see Spider-Man fighting against the Sinister Six, who are led by Doctor Octopus. Despite Spider-Man leaving the Avengers in Shattered Heroes, the members of the team are supporting characters, and he rejoins the team at the beginning. The story was written by Dan Slott and brings storylines that have been running since issue #600 was released in July 2009 to fruition. Marvel released several preview images for the event, and has written an article about why each current member of the Sinister Six is important for this group.

== Plot summary ==
=== Lead-up ===
Doctor Octopus learns that he only has a few months left to live due to injuries he has sustained in recent fights. During the "Origin of the Species" storyline, Doctor Octopus enlists the help of several villains to kidnap the presumed newborn son of Norman Osborn and Menace because he believes the unique combination of their blood can provide a cure for him. When he learns Harry Osborn is the father, he realizes no cure will be found in the boy's blood. Doctor Octopus captures Tony Stark and forces him to work on a cure for him by threatening to blow up a bomb, despite Tony telling Octavius that he is not a medical doctor. Doctor Octopus has an army of Macro-Octobots attack New York City to keep Spider-Man and the Avengers occupied while his Sinister Six (consisting of Chameleon, Electro, Mysterio, Rhino, Sandman, and himself) infiltrates a military base, but Spider-Man and the Avengers are able to stop them. The Sinister Six create a cosmic problem on a Caribbean island to keep Spider-Man and the Future Foundation occupied and away from the Baxter Building so the Sinister Six can sneak inside and steal one of Reed Richards' inventions. The Sinister Six attack a lab in Paris to create an opening to the Avengers Academy to steal a device containing self-sustaining power invented by Hank Pym. The Sinister Six fight and defeat the Intelligencia so that the Sinister Six is the only team of supervillains left to conquer the world. They also steal the Intelligencia's Zero Cannon (a weapon which negates Earth's gravity) to send objects to space. Doctor Octopus appears in a new robot suit designed to keep him alive. Doctor Octopus has some Octobots sneak aboard John Jameson's space shuttle when it launches for Horizon Labs' Apogee 1 Space Station, and tries to have them take over the space station by having the Octobots mind-control the space station's personnel. Spider-Man, the Human Torch, and John Jameson are able to stop the Octobots, but the space station is destroyed.

=== Main plot ===
After bringing a firefighter to the hospital for injuries sustained during an attack by Equinox, Spider-Man arrives at Horizon Labs and learns Mayor J. Jonah Jameson plans to shut down Horizon. At the Sinister Six's underwater base, Doctor Octopus activates a giant antennae called the Octahedral which in turn activate his satellites called the Octavian Lens. The Octavian Lens speed up the Greenhouse effect, raising the Earth's temperature. Hacking into the TV screens around the world, Doctor Octopus announces what is happening and reveals he also has technology to fight global warming, so that he can be known as the man who "gave you the greatest gift of all...a future." Peter Parker dons a new Spider-Man costume he had prepared in anticipation for the Sinister Six's next attack and meets up with the Avengers.

In a flashback, the Sinister Six are shown stealing objects from around the world to further their plans. In the present at Palazzo Senatorio, an international meeting of the world's greatest minds and the world leaders discuss Doctor Octopus' offer. The Avengers and Spider-Man try to convince the leaders they cannot negotiate with a supervillain. When Al Gore says that Doctor Octopus would save them, Spider-Man punches him, revealing to everyone that Gore is the Chameleon in disguise. Spider-Man explains his new costume can detect which person is actually Chameleon. Meanwhile, at Horizon Labs, Mayor J. Jonah Jameson gives orders to shut down the laboratories, saying he does not care about the rest of the world. Back in Rome, a transmission from Doctor Octopus states he has activated the Octavian Lens which are blocking the harmful UV rays from the sun to reinforce his offer. Spider-Man is forced to let Chameleon go, but secretly places a Spider-Tracer on him. They follow Chameleon to the Mediterranean Coast where the rest of the Sinister Six is waiting. Although Thor is able to hurl Electro into the upper atmosphere, the Sinister Six successfully subdue the Avengers using the objects stolen in the flashback. Doctor Octopus says he has succeeded in another goal, defeating Spider-Man.

As the remaining five members of the Sinister Six depart, Silver Sable arrives, and manages to rescue Black Widow and allow Spider-Man to track the Sinister Six. As Doctor Octopus issues his demands for two hundred facilities to be turned over to him to launch the missiles needed for the process to start, Spider-Man contacts Horizon Labs for help. Tracking one of the facilities in the Sahara, Spider-Man, Black Widow and Silver Sable confront the Sandman. Spider-Man identifies and isolates the one grain of sand containing Sandman's consciousness. Inside the facility they realize it is a decoy as it was producing hollow shells of satellites. Doctor Octopus contacts the UN and orders them to turn their resources towards killing the 'global terror' Spider-Man.

Over the course of the next three days, Spider-Man, Black Widow and Silver Sable make hit-and-run attacks on the factories that are constructing Doctor Octopus' satellites. In Korea, they defeat the Rhino with Spider-Man's electrified webbing. However, S.H.I.E.L.D. forces arrive on the scene to arrest Spider-Man and his allies. With nearly all of the Earth's governments siding with Doctor Octopus, Spider-Man is considered Global Public Enemy #1. Back in New York City, Mayor Jameson declares martial law and has his Anti-Spider Squad patrol the streets to prevent looting. Mary Jane waits for Peter's return, confident that he will win against Doctor Octopus, and plans of a way to show everyone how much of a hero he truly is. Silver Sable begins to show signs of romantic feelings toward Spider-Man. After interrogating the captured Sandman for information they receive a surprising message from Titanium Man. Spider-Man rallies Union Jack, Sabra, Kangaroo, and Big Hero 6 to help stop the construction of Octavius' satellites. Spider-Man's group finds a deserted factory near the border between Symkaria and Romania. Doctor Octopus appears on the monitor, claiming victory as the last of his satellites had already been launched. When Spider-Man goads him to prove he was going to save the world, Doctor Octopus instead admits that Spider-Man was right all along. Octavius does not want the 'mediocre and mundane' to live on while his genius dies, and begins to burn everything on Earth's day side.

While Spider-Man, Black Widow, and Silver Sable are tracking down Doctor Octopus' location, Spider-Man's allies invade other facilities. In another facility, Sabra fights through an army of Octobots until she is shot by Crossbones. In Australia, Kangaroo enters a facility and is ambushed by Lady Deathstrike. In another facility, Titanium Man is defeated by Scorpion.

As Spider-Man and his allies exit the factory, they see Symkaria being burned by Doctor Octopus' satellites. They are unaware that it is a ruse created by Mysterio and the Chameleon to distract them from the actual completion of the satellites. Meanwhile, Doctor Octopus again asks the people of Earth to aid him against those who are trying to stop his plans. He learns of Mysterio and Chameleon's actions and is enraged that Chameleon is battling Spider-Man in what Doctor Octopus believes should be HIS final duel with the wall-crawler. He takes control of Chameleon's battlesuit and tries to destroy Spider-Man, allowing Spider-Man and the others to realize Symkaria's destruction is fake. After defeating the battlesuit, Spider-Man convinces Mysterio to switch sides with the argument that $2 billion will be worthless if Doctor Octopus destroys the world. The team is led to a location in Guatemala where they are attacked by Octobot-controlled Avengers. During the battle, Spider-Man realizes all the inventions he has created at Horizon Labs have been hacked by Doctor Octopus.

Although the Octobot-controlled Iron Man knocks out Hawkeye and Black Widow, Spider-Man's new kung-fu training allows him to defeat Spider-Woman while Silver Sable knocks out Captain America, who was holding back to give her a chance. Spider-Man immobilizes Thor by tricking Octavius into taking full control (making Thor unworthy to wield his hammer), and Mysterio frees Iron Man and Red Hulk by using an EMP to disable the Octobots. While Thor, Hulk and Iron Man fly up to destroy Octavius's missiles, Mysterio gives Spider-Man and Silver Sable a ship that can take them to Doctor Octopus's sea fortress, then escapes. Upon arriving, they are confronted by the Rhino, still Octopus's ally, who pins Sable to the floor as water begins to flood the corridor. Silver Sable orders Spider-Man to leave her. Spider-Man finds Doctor Octopus who traps him with all eight arms. Doctor Octopus reveals he has calculated that 0.08% of Earth's population will survive, with those fifty thousand remembering him as the greatest mass murderer of all time. Unable to convince Doctor Octopus that the heat he is generating will fry the brains of the survivors, Spider-Man breaks free and destroys his enemy's equipment. Spider-Man is left to mourn the death of Silver Sable as he is rescued by the Horizon Labs staff on their boat. Spider-Man asks the Horizon Labs staff to build a life support unit for Doctor Octopus.

=== Aftermath ===
Spider-Man spends the next few hours searching for Silver Sable's body, but is eventually relieved by the Black Widow (with orders from Captain America) who tells Spider-Man to help escort Doctor Octopus to the Raft. Since he is the expert on handling Doctor Octopus, Spider-Man is given no choice. Though Captain America tries to comfort the web-slinger by reminding him that Silver Sable knew the risks, Spider-Man instead reminisces about a past adventure with Silver Sable and how he got to know her better. He confronts Doctor Octopus and tells him that since his satellites will be destroyed, he will die without leaving any legacy. The Avengers depart with a final scene of an Octobot floating on the surface of the water. Octopus' story was continued in the November 2012 storyline "Dying Wish".

After Dying Wish while Octopus's mind is in Peter Parker's body for the duration of the Superior Spider-Man series, Octopus (who has turned into a sort of hero due to inheriting Peter's memories), he encounters the anti-hero Cardiac. Cardiac is stealing technology in order to operate on a dying girl. It turns out the girl is dying due to the events of Ends of the Earth, wherein she did not receive enough oxygen to her brain, severely damaging her due to a previous medical condition. Octopus saves the girl, who later becomes instrumental in Peter gaining his body back.

== Reception ==
- The Amazing Spider-Man #682 received a rating of 8.0 out of 10 from IGN, and a score of 8 out of 10 based on 13 reviews on Comic Book Roundup.
- The Amazing Spider-Man #683 received a rating of 6.5 out of 10 from IGN, and a score of 8.2 out of 10 based on 12 reviews on Comic Book Roundup.
- The Amazing Spider-Man #684 received a rating of 7.5 out of 10 from IGN, and a score of 8.2 out of 10 based on 8 reviews on Comic Book Roundup.
- The Amazing Spider-Man #685 received a rating of 6.5 out of 10 from IGN, and a score of 8.1 out of 10 based on 6 reviews on Comic Book Roundup.
- The Amazing Spider-Man #686 received a rating of 7.0 out of 10 from IGN, and a score of 8.1 out of 10 based on 11 reviews on Comic Book Roundup.
- The Amazing Spider-Man #687 received a rating of 5.0 out of 10 from IGN, and a score of 7.9 out of 10 based on 13 reviews on Comic Book Roundup.
- The Amazing Spider-Man: Ends of the Earth special received a rating of 6.0 out of 10 from IGN, and a score of 5.2 out of 10 based on 1 review on Comic Book Roundup.
- Avenging Spider-Man #8 received a rating of 5.5 out of 10 from IGN, and a score of 5.7 out of 10 based on 7 reviews on Comic Book Roundup.

== In other media ==
In Ultimate Spider-Man, after Doctor Octopus gained Hydra nano bots designed after Swarm, he used them to upgrade into an appearance inspired by his design from "Ends of the Earth".

== Collected editions ==
Title	Material collected	Published date	ISBN
Spider-Man: Ends of the Earth	Amazing Spider-Man #682–687, Spider-Man: Ends of the Earth #1 and Avenging Spider-Man #8	August 2012	978-0785160052
Spider-Man: Big Time: The Complete Collection Vol. 3	Amazing Spider-Man #677–687 and #679.1, Daredevil (vol. 3) #8, Amazing Spider-Man: Ends Of The Earth #1 and Avenging Spider-Man #8	February 2015	978-0785192152

== See also ==
- Spider-Man collected editions
- The Superior Spider-Man
- Spider-Man: Octo-Girl
