= Spider-Man: Octo-Girl =

Spider-Man manga series

- Cover of Spider-Man: Octo-Girl vol. 1.

スパイダーマン：オクトパスガール (Supaidāman: Okutopasu Gāru)
- Genre: Isekai, Superhero
- Manga
- Written by: Hideyuki Furuhashi
- Illustrated by: Betten Court
- Published by: Shueisha
- English publisher: NA: Viz Media
- Imprint: Jump+ Comics
- Magazine: Shōnen Jump+
- Original run: June 20, 2023 – present
- Volumes: 4

Spider-Man: Octo-Girl (Note: Known in Japan as Spider-Man: Octopus Girl (Japanese: スパイダーマン：オクトパスガール, Hepburn: Supaidāman: Okutopasu Gāru)) is a Japanese manga series written by Hideyuki Furuhashi and drawn by Betten Court, "supervised" by Marvel Comics, and published to Shōnen Jump+. A continuation of The Superior Spider-Man and Ends of the Earth, initially marketed as a spin-off of the Spider-Verse film series, the series follows the Superior Spider-Man Otto Octavius as he mentors a young girl his mind is thrown into, Otoha Okutamiya.

Initially published across three volumes released from June 20, 2023 to January 9, 2025, on its release in Japan and the United States the series received a universally positive critical reception, leading to its return for a fourth volume in December 2025.

== Plot ==
In the first three volumes, set between the events of The Superior Spider-Man Volumes 2 and 3, Otto Octavius falls to his death during a battle with Spider-Man. His AI attempts to swap his mind into a clone, but accidentally shares his consciousness with a young Japanese schoolgirl Otoha Okutamiya. He summons one of his harnesses to help Otaha with some of her school bullying and other adolescent issues, while also searching for a neurolitic brain scanner to return him to his body, which has been left comatose. They bump into other superheroes like Sakura Spider, magical girls, and a clone of Otto himself as Superior Octopus who does not recall any events after Spider-Geddon or Superior Spider-Man Volume 2.. They come to a head with an evil corporation called Across that murdered Ohtana's friend's (Touma Taka) father. Touma creates a vulture suit with the help of Superior Octopus, who is trying to infiltrate Across Corporation's cyber security network. Otto reluctantly agrees to assist Ohtana in saving Touma from becoming a terrorist. After the attack is stopped, Across decides to use this as an opportunity to test out their new "Vulture" attack drone system, so they two work together to defeat the drones. At the end of the third volume, Superior Octopus discovers that the drones are being controlled by a third Otto clone, who inhabited the body of Otto right before the events of The Superior Spider-Man.

The fourth volume picks up after the events of The Superior Spider-Man Volume 3, returning to Otoha, Otto, and his clones in Japan.

== Characters ==
- Otoha Okutamiya (奥田宮 乙葉, Okutamiya Otoha) – A meek, petite middle-schooler whom Otto's mind ends up bound to, mentoring her in navigating everyday life.
- Otto Octavius (オットー・オクタビアス) – The mind of the Superior Spider-Man and former supervillain Doctor Octopus, who is bound to Otoha's body, controlling a robot to speak.
- Marika Maruko (丸児 真里加, Maruko Marika) – An overweight gyaru student who dislikes Otoha.
- Kirika Kurabe (倉辺 桐香, Kurabe Kiriya) – Marika's best friend, a former actress/would-be magical girl.
- Denko Deirogi (泥路木 デンコ, Deirogi Denko) – A poor student who is raising her own siblings.
- Taka Touma (当麻 多華, Touma Taka) – Otoha's best friend and the villainous Vulture of Japan.
- Bivari Bekku (別久 美波鈴, Beku Bivari) – The teacher of Otoha's class.
- Haruka Hida (飛騨 遥, Hida Haruka) – The spider-powered superhero Sakura Spider, trapped on Earth-616 since the events of End of the Spider-Verse.
- Superior Octopus / Superior Spider-Man (スーペリア・オクトパス / スーペリア・スパイダーマン) – A spider-powered clone of Otto uploaded with his memories from before the events of Spider-Geddon.
- Ends of the Earth Otto – A clone of Otto uploaded with his memories from before the events of Ends of the Earth.
- Maxine Danger (マクシーン・デンジャー) – The chairwoman of Across Company, who harbors the Ends of the Earth Otto.
- Peter Parker (ピーター・パーカー) – The spider-powered superhero Spider-Man, who visits Otto's comatose body every day.

== Publication ==
Spider-Man: Octopus Girl was first announced at San Diego Comic-Con in 2023, alongside several other Marvel-themed manga adaptations. It began serialization in Japan published by Shōnen Jump+ and was well-received by fans. It was later confirmed for an international release as Spider-Man: Octo-Girl, with plans for a wider distribution through platforms like VIZ Media and Marvel Unlimited.

It premiered its first chapter of its first volume on June 20, 2023; while originally announced to be concluding after its third volume ended on January 7, 2025, the series will return for a fourth volume in December 2025.

== Reception ==
The manga has received generally positive critical reviews, deemed a fun and worthy continuation of the storylines from The Superior Spider-Man (2013–2014) and The Superior Spider-Man (2018–2019).

== Collected editions ==
#	Title	Material collected	Format	Pages	Released	ISBN
Trade Paperbacks
1	The Genius Scientist and the School Girl	Spider-Man Octo-Girl #1–7	TPB	200	May 2025	978-1-9747-5476-2
2	Assailant	Spider-Man Octo-Girl #8–16, bonus manga The Marvels	TPB	200	May 2025	978-1-9747-5476-2
3	Tower Attack	Spider-Man Octo-Girl #17–25	TPB	192	Nov 2025	978-1-9747-5846-3
4	Superior	Spider-Man Octo-Girl #26–34	TPB	TBA	2026	978-4-0888-4521-0
