= List of Venom titles =

List of comics featuring the symbiote Venom

The various iterations of Venom have appeared as a principal character in a number of limited series, one shots, and ongoing series published by Marvel Comics. With the first issue of the first limited series published at the end of 1992 (cover dated February 1993), the character appeared in a string of 17 limited series. These series did not overlap in publication (with the exception of Venom – Deathtrap: The Vault which was a reprint of another book), each having more than a month between the end of one series and the start of the next. With the exception of one shot titles, this resulted in the character appearing as the focal character of a new issue each month through the end of Venom: The Finale, published in November 1997 (cover dated January 1998), composing the equivalent of a five-year ongoing series from 1992 to 1997, with other issues and series following that.

For most of these issues, Eddie Brock has been the main character and host for the Venom symbiote with the exception of Venom vol. 1, Dark Reign: Sinister Spider-Man, Venom/Deadpool What If?, and Venom vol. 2. The Amazing Spider-Man Presents – Anti-Venom: New Ways to Live could also be considered an exception because Eddie Brock is the main character but it is not the original Venom symbiote.

== List ==
Title	Issues	Initial cover date	Final cover date	Story	LGY
Venom: Lethal Protector	#1–6	February 1993	July 1993	After calling a truce with Spider-Man, Eddie Brock moves to San Francisco to help fight crime as an anti-hero. This story introduces Scream, Phage, Riot, Lasher, and Agony.	#1-6
Venom: Deathtrap – The Vault	#1	March 1993		Reprint of Avengers – Deathtrap: The Vault, which features Venom engineering a facility-wide break out of the incarcerated villains in the Vault in an attempt to escape.	
Venom: Funeral Pyre	#1–3	August 1993	October 1993	Venom is contacted by a reporter in a gang and asks for help. Meanwhile, the Punisher is working to take the same gang down.	#7-9
Venom: The Madness	#1–3	November 1993	January 1994	The Juggernaut attempts to kidnap Beck, Eddie's love interest. Venom, who has been hearing voices (other than the symbiote) attempts to save her while trying to maintain his sanity.	#10-12
Venom: The Enemy Within	#1–3	February 1994	April 1994	On Halloween, Venom takes on an army of "goblins" with help from Morbius, the Living Vampire. Demogoblin also appears.	#13-15
The Incredible Hulk vs. Venom	#1	April 1994		Venom and the Hulk team up to combat a terrorist causing earthquakes in San Francisco.	
Venom: The Mace	#1–3	May 1994	July 1994	Venom comes into conflict with Mace, a bounty hunter who is being hunted by the organization that created him.	#16-18
Venom: Nights of Vengeance	#1–4	August 1994	November 1994	Venom works with Vengeance against an alien race of hunters known only as the Stalkers.	#19-22
Venom: Separation Anxiety	#1–4	December 1994	March 1995	After being split apart from his other by the Scarlet Spider (Spider-Man #53), Eddie once again faces the symbiotes from Lethal Protector.	#23-26
Venom: Carnage Unleashed	#1–4	April 1995	July 1995	Cletus Kasady has a video game licensed after his alter ego but is not making any money from it. He breaks out of the Ravencroft Institute for the Criminally Insane to go after the producer.	#27-30
Venom Super Special	#1	August 1995		Part 3 of the five part Planet of the Symbiotes arc. Venom teams up with Spider-Man and the Scarlet Spider to stop a symbiote invasion of earth.	Not LGY (Note: Originally, Marvel's 2017 legacy numbering chart counted Venom Super Special #1 (#31) and Venom: Seed of Darkness #-1 (#57) while omitting Venom: Sign of the Boss #1–2. In 2021, the cover gallery in Venom (vol. 4) #35 / LGY #200 retroactively corrected the count by dropping the two one-shots, reassigning #31-55, and assigning #56–57 to Sign of the Boss. See Venom: Sign of the Boss GCD Notes)
Venom: Sinner Takes All	#1–5	August 1995	December 1995	After the events of Carnage Unleashed, Venom contends with a new Sin-Eater. First appearance of She-Venom.	#31-35
Rune vs. Venom	#1	December 1995		A leftover symbiote from the Planet of the Symbiotes arc bonds with Rune of Malibu Comics after he enters the Marvel Universe. He then begins to frame Venom for the murder of civilians.	
Venom: Along Came A Spider	#1–4	January 1996	April 1996	Venom breaks his wife out of the local precinct and Ben Reilly (as Spider-Man) shows up to help stop him. There is a back-up story featuring the origin of Hybrid.	#36-39
Venom: The Hunted	#1–3	May 1996	July 1996	Venom is being stalked by symbiote-eating creatures and fighting for his life. Hybrid also appears.	#40-42
Venom: The Hunger	#1–4	August 1996	November 1996	Eddie finds that the symbiote has a craving for brains and it drives him to consume the brains of an enemy. Horrified, Eddie does not know what to do and the symbiote leaves him to fulfill its hunger.	#43-46
Venom: Tooth and Claw	#1–3	December 1996	February 1997	Venom and Wolverine fight against a possessive entity known as Dirt Nap. While Wolverine is trying to save a boy that has been possessed by the creature, Venom has no such concern.	#47-49
Venom: On Trial	#1–3	March 1997	May 1997	Similar plot to the Spider-Man Special Edition, with Venom being judged for his actions and with Matt Murdock acting in his defense.	#50-52
Venom: License to Kill	#1–3	June 1997	August 1997	Venom is employed by the government to take down a ring of terrorists with a deadly new chemical agent that can kill within 48 hours if inhaled.	#53-55
Flashback – Venom: Seeds of Darkness	# -1	July 1997		Eddie Brock covers a story on Krobaa, the living darkness.	Not LGY
Venom: Sign of the Boss	#1–2	September 1997	October 1997	Venom has a confrontation with his ally/enemy Ghost Rider while trying to take down a crime boss.	#56-57
Venom: The Finale	#1–3	November 1997	January 1998	Venom defuses a bomb planted in his chest by the government. The end of the original run of mini series' featuring Venom. Spider-Man appears.	#58-60
Spider-Man: The Venom Agenda	#1	January 1998		Venom goes after J. Jonah Jameson under orders from a covert government committee while Spider-Man attempts to stop him.	
Venom (vol. 1)	#1–18	June 2003	November 2004	A clone of the symbiote is made from a piece of Venom's tongue. It attacks an Alaskan base and comes into conflict with the real Venom, Spider-Man, and Wolverine. This series was composed of the arcs Shiver (1–5), Run (6–10), Patterns (11–13), and Twist (14–18). The story is unresolved.	#61-78
Venom/Carnage	#1–4	September 2004	December 2004	Carnage is going to give birth to a new symbiote and is planning to kill it but Venom wants to raise the new symbiote as an ally. Instead of either, the symbiote finds a host of its own in the form of a New York City cop named Patrick Mulligan. They bond and become known as Toxin. Spider-Man and Black Cat appear.	
Venom: Dark Origin	#1–5	October 2008	February 2009	Tells the story of Eddie Brock's childhood and his downward spiral into becoming the original Venom. In addition to new material, this series retells parts of The Amazing Spider-Man #300.	#79-83
Dark Reign: Sinister Spider-Man	#1–4	August 2009	November 2009	Tells the adventures of Mac Gargan (the third and then current Venom) as the Spider-Man for the Dark Avengers.	
The Amazing Spider-Man Presents – Anti-Venom: New Ways to Live	#1–3	November 2009	February 2010	Eddie Brock (now as Anti-Venom) once again encounters the Punisher while fighting drug dealers.	
Venom/Deadpool: What If?	#1	April 2011		A four-part back-up story that was later collected into a single reprint. Tells the story of what would happen if the Venom symbiote bonded with Deadpool.	
Venom (vol. 2)	#1–42 #13.1 – 13.4 #27.1	May 2011	December 2013	After removing it from Mac Gargan, the government gives the symbiote to Flash Thompson to be a black ops agent. During "Spider-Island" he encounters Eddie Brock as Anti-Venom. He joins the Secret Avengers and fights the Savage Six. He relocates to Philadelphia to continue as a lone superhero, and encounters Eddie Brock again, first as a non-powered "symbiote slayer" and later as Toxin.	#84-130
Venom: Space Knight	#1–13	January 2016	December 2016	Flash Thompson has been tasked with being an intergalactic ambassador of Earth and an Agent of the Cosmos.	#131-143
Venom (vol. 3)	#1–6 #150–165	January 2017	June 2018	Lee Price gains the symbiote in #1, before losing it in #6 and Eddie Brock gaining the symbiote for the rest of the volume.	#144-149 #150–165
Edge of Venomverse	#1–5	August 2017	October 2017	A group of aliens called the Poisons are hunting symbiotes across the multiverse, leading Eddie Brock to fight back.	
Venomverse War Stories	#1	November 2017		A group of aliens called the Poisons are hunting symbiotes across the multiverse, leading Eddie Brock to fight back.	
Venomverse	#1–5	November 2017	December 2017	A group of aliens called the Poisons are hunting symbiotes across the multiverse, leading Eddie Brock to fight back.	
Venomized	#1–5	April 2018	May 2018	Venom and the X-Men are desperately racing back to Earth to warn everyone of an impending invasion by the Poisons, who want to bond every super hero with a Klyntar symbiote.	
Venom (vol. 4)	#1–35 and Web of Venom One-Shots	May 2018	June 2021	Eddie Brock discovers he has a son, Dylan, the return of Carnage (Absolute Carnage) and the arrival of the symbiote God Knull (King in Black).	#166-200
Venom: First Host	#1–5	August 2018	November 2018	Venom's first host, Tel-Kar, has returned and stole the symbiote from Eddie. Eddie with the help of an ally and Venom's latest offspring, they stop Tel-Kar and saves the symbiote along with other innocent lives.	
Spider-Man & Venom: Double Trouble	#1–4	January 2020	April 2020	An out of continuity all-ages story.	
Venom/Carnage	#1–4	September 2021	October 2021	Infinite comic.	
Venom (vol. 5)	#1–39	November 2021 – November 2024		Following the events of King in Black, Dylan Brock is the new host of the Venom symbiote while Eddie Brock is the new King in Black.	#201-239
Venom: Lethal Protector (vol. 2)	#1–5	May 2022	October 2022	Flashback story set not long after Eddie Brock first became Venom.	
Ms. Marvel & Venom	#1	November 2022		Ms. Marvel (Kamala Khan) teams up with Dylan Brock.	
Venom: Lethal Protector II	#1–5	May 2023	September 2023	Flashback story pitting Venom against Doctor Doom.	
Venom War	#1-5	August 2024	November 2024	Eddie and Dylan go to war with each other to determine who will get to be Venom's one true host. Meanwhile, artificial zombified symbiotes created by Meridius attack New York.	
All-New Venom	#1-10	December 2024	September 2025	Following the events of Venom War, Dylan Brock attempts to figure out who Venom's new host is, with the suspects consisting of Rick Jones, Luke Cage, Robbie Robertson, and Madame Masque.	#240-249
Venom (vol. 6)	#250-	October 2025			#250-

== Collected editions ==
=== Omnibus ===
Title	Volume	Material collected	Publication date	Page count	ISBN
Venomnibus	1	Venom: Lethal Protector #1–6, Venom: Funeral Pyre #1–3, Daredevil #323, Iron Man #302, Darkhawk #35–37, Venom: The Madness #1–3, Venom: The Enemy Within #1–3, Incredible Hulk Vs. Venom #1, Venom: The Mace #1–3, Nightwatch #5–6, Venom: Nights Of Vengeance #1–4, Spider-Man: The Arachnis Project #6, Web Of Spider-Man #118–119, Spider-Man #52–53, Venom: Separation Anxiety #1–4, Venom: Carnage Unleashed #1–4, and material from Silver Sable & The Wild Pack #18–19	July 3, 2018	1096	978-1302912444
Venomnibus	2	Venom: Sinner Takes All #1–5, Venom: Along Came A Spider #1–4, Venom: The Hunted #1–3, Venom: The Hunger #1–4, Venom: Tooth and Claw #1–3, Venom: On Trial #1–3, Venom: License To Kill #1–3, Venom: Seed of Darkness #-1, Venom: Sign of The Boss #1–2, Spider-Man: The Venom Agenda #1, Venom: The Finale #1–3, Uncanny Origins #7; and material from Amazing Spider-Man Super Special, Spider-Man Super Special, Venom Super Special, Spectacular Spider-Man Super Special, Web Of Spider-Man Super Special, Spider-Man Holiday Special 1995	February 19, 2019	1176	978-1302916534
Venomnibus	3	Peter Parker: Spider-Man #9–10,12, 16–17; Nova (vol. 3) #7; Amazing Spider-Man (vol. 2) #12, 19; Spectacular Spider-Man (vol. 2) #1–5; Venom (vol. 1) #1–18; Venom vs. Carnage #1–4; Marvel Knights Spider-Man #7–8, 11; Sensational Spider-Man (vol. 2) #38–39; Spider-man/Fantastic Four #2, and material from Spider-Man Family #1–2	November 17, 2020	1088	978-1302926328
Spider-Man Vs. Venom Omnibus		Amazing Spider-Man #258, 300, 315–317, 332–333, 346–347, 361–363, 374, 378–380; Web of Spider-Man #1, 95–96, 101–103; Avengers Deathtrap – The Vault; Darkhawk #13–14; Spider-Man: The Trial of Venom #1; Ghost Rider/Blaze: Spirits of Vengeance #5–6; Spider-Man #35–37, Spectacular Spider-Man #201–203 and material from Amazing Spider-Man #373, 375, 388 and Annual #25–26; Web of Spider-Man Annual #7–8; Spectacular Spider-Man Annual #12; Marvel Comics Presents #117–122, Spider-Man Unlimited #1–2	September 18, 2018	1160	978-1302913205
Agent Venom Omnibus		Amazing Spider-Man #654 (B story), 654.1; Venom (vol. 2) #1–42, 13.1–13.4, 27.1; Venom: Space Knight #1–13, Minimum Carnage: Alpha, Scarlet Spider (vol. 2) #10–11, Minimum Carnage: Omega	July 25, 2025	1464	978-1302966270
Venomnibus By Cates & Stegman		Venom (vol. 4) #1–35, Venom Annual #1, Web of Venom: Ve'Nam #1, Web of Venom: Carnage Born #1, Web of Venom: Wraith #1, Absolute Carnage #1–5, King in Black #1–5; and material from Free Comic Book Day 2019 (Spider-Man/Venom) #1, Free Comic Book Day 2020 (Spider-Man/Venom) #1, Incoming #1, Carnage: Black, White & Blood #2	December 13, 2022	1352	978-1302946418
Absolute Carnage Omnibus		Absolute Carnage #1–5, Absolute Carnage vs. Deadpool #1–3, Absolute Carnage: Captain Marvel #1, Absolute Carnage: Immortal Hulk #1, Absolute Carnage: Symbiote Spider-Man #1, Absolute Carnage: Symbiote Of Vengeance #1, Absolute Carnage: Lethal Protectors #1–3, Absolute Carnage: Avengers #1, Absolute Carnage: Miles Morales #1–3, Absolute Carnage: Weapon Plus #1, Absolute Carnage: Scream #1–3, Absolute Carnage: Separation Anxiety #1, Amazing Spider-Man (vol. 5) #29–31, Venom (vol. 4) #16–20, Absolute Carnage stinger pages	September 8, 2020	776	978-1302925291
King in Black Omnibus		King in Black #1–5, King in Black: Black Panther #1, King in Black: Captain America #1, King in Black: Ghost Rider #1, King in Black: The Immortal Hulk #1, King in Black: Iron Man/Doom #1, King in Black: Wiccan and Hulkling #1, King In Black: Planet of the Symbiotes #1–3, King in Black: Black Knight #1, King in Black: Namor #1–5, King In Black: Thunderbolts #1–3, King in Black: Marauders #1, King In Black: Gwenom vs. Carnage #1–3, King in Black: Scream #1, King in Black: Spider-Man #1, King In Black: Return of the Valkyries #1–4, Symbiote Spider-Man: King In Black #1–5, Spider-Woman (vol. 7) #7–8, Black Cat (vol. 2) #1–3, Venom (vol. 4) #31–34, Savage Avengers #17–19, Daredevil (vol. 6) #26–27, Deadpool (vol. 8) #10, Fantastic Four (vol. 6) #29–30, Guardians of the Galaxy (vol. 6) #10, Miles Morales: Spider-Man #23, S.W.O.R.D. (vol. 2) #2–4, The Union #1–2 and King in Black Handbook	December 6, 2022	1568	978-1302946432

=== Epic Collections ===
Volume	Subtitle	Years covered	Issues collected	Pages	Publication date	ISBN
1	Symbiosis	1984–1994	Amazing Spider-Man #258, 300, 315–17, 332–33, 346–47, 388 (B story), Web of Spider-Man #1, Marvel Graphic Novel No. 68 – Avengers: Deathtrap – The Vault, Darkhawk #13–14 and material from Amazing Spider-Man Annual #25–26; Web of Spider-Man Annual #7–8; and Spectacular Spider-Man Annual #12	472	November 4, 2020	978-1302927295
2	Lethal Protector	1992–1993	Amazing Spider-Man #361–363, 388, Spider-Man: The Trial of Venom #1, Web of Spider-Man #95–96, Ghost Rider/Blaze: Spirits of Vengeance #5–6, Venom: Lethal Protector #1–6 and material from Marvel Comics Presents #117–122; and Amazing Spider-Man #373, 375	480	January 4, 2022	978-1302932046
4	The Madness	1995	Iron Man #302; Darkhawk #35–37; Venom: The Madness #1–3; Venom: The Enemy Within #1–3; Incredible Hulk vs. Venom #1; Venom: The Mace #1–3; Nightwatch #5–6; Venom: Nights of Vengeance 1–4		September 13, 2023	
5	Carnage Unleashed	1994–1995	Spider-Man: The Arachnis Project #6; Web of Spider-Man #118–119; Spider-Man #52–53; Venom: Separation Anxiety #1–4; Venom: Carnage Unleashed #1–4; Venom: Sinner Takes All #1–5; Uncanny Origins #7	496	September 27, 2022	978-1302948252
6	Planet of the Symbiotes	1995–1996	Venom: Along Came A Spider #1-4; Venom: The Hunted #1-3 and material from Amazing Spider-Man Super Special #1; Spider-Man Super Special #1; Venom Super Special #1, Spectacular Spider-Man Super Special #1; Web of Spider-Man Super Special #1; Venom: Sinner Takes All #1-4 and Spider-Man Holiday Special 1995	488	October 28, 2025	978-1302965211
7	The Hunger	1996–1997	Venom: The Hunger #1-4; Venom: Tooth and Claw #1-3; Venom: One Trial #1-3; Venom: Licence to Kill #1-3; Venom: Seed of Darkness #-1; Venom: Sign of the Boss #1-2; Spider-Man: The Venom Agenda #1; Venom: The Finale #1-3	512	August 28, 2024	978-1302959890

=== Trade paperback ===
Title	Issues collected	Pages	Publication Date	ISBN
Eddie Brock
Venom by Michelinie & McFarlane	Amazing Spider-Man #300, 315–317	128	May 18, 2021	978-1302929534
Spider-Man: Birth of Venom	Secret Wars #8; Amazing Spider-Man #252–259, 298–300, 315–317; Fantastic Four #274, Web of Spider-Man #1	352	April 4, 2007	978-0785124986
Venom: Planet of the Symbiotes	Material from Amazing Spider-Man Super Special, Spider-Man Super Special, Venom Super Special, Spectacular Spider-Man Super Special, Web Of Spider-Man Super Special	128	September 25, 2018	978-1302913656
Venom: Lethal Protector	Venom: Lethal Protector #1–6	144	January 31, 2018	978-1302911768
Venom: The Enemy Within	Venom: Funeral Pyre #1–3, Venom: The Madness #1–3, Venom: The Enemy Within #1–3, Incredible Hulk Vs. Venom #1	240	July 3, 2013	978-0785184348
Venom: Separation Anxiety	Venom: The Mace #1–3, Venom: Nights of Vengeance #1–4, Web of Spider-Man #118–119, Spider-Man #52–53, Venom: Separation Anxiety #1–4	352	January 5, 2017	978-1302901721
Venom: Carnage Unleashed	Venom: Carnage Unleashed #1–4, Venom: Sinner Takes All #1–5; and material from Amazing Spider-Man Super Special, Spider-Man Super Special, Venom Super Special, Spectacular Spider-Man Super Special and Web of Spider-Man Super Special	440	November 28, 2017	978-1302907969
Venom: Along Came a Spider...	Venom: Along Came A Spider #1–4, Venom: The Hunted #1–3, Venom: The Hunger #1–4 and material from Spider-Man Holiday Special 1995	392	September 4, 2018	978-1302913625
Venom: Tooth and Claw	Venom: Tooth And Claw #1–3, Venom: On Trial #1–3, Venom: License To Kill #1–3, Venom: Seed Of Darkness #-1, Venom: Sign Of The Boss #1–2, Spider-Man: The Venom Agenda, Venom: The Finale #1–3	408	September 25, 2018	978-1302913663
Venom Vs. Carnage	Venom Vs. Carnage #1–4	96	March 21, 2007	978-0785115243
Venom Vol. 1: Shiver	Venom (vol. 1) #1–5	120	July 1, 2004	978-0785112525
Venom Vol. 2: Run	Venom (vol. 1) #6–13	192	October 1, 2004	978-0785115533
Venom Vol. 3: Twist	Venom (vol. 1) #14–18	120	December 8, 2004	978-0785115540
Venom by Daniel Way Ultimate Collection	Venom (vol. 1) #1–18	424	March 16, 2011	978-0785157045
Venom: Dark Origin	Venom Dark Origin #1–5	120	September 11, 2018	978-1302912802
The Amazing Spider-Man Presents: Anti-Venom	Spider-Man Presents: Anti-Venom #1–3 and material from Amazing Spider-Man: Extra #2		March 10, 2010	978-0785141617
Venom Vol. 2: The Land Before Crime	Venom #150–153	160	October 25, 2017	978-1302906030
Venom Vol. 3: Blood in the Water	Venom #154–158	136	January 31, 2018	978-1302906047
Amazing Spider-Man: Venom Inc.	Venom #159–160, Amazing Spider-Man: Venom Inc. Alpha and Omega, Amazing Spider-Man #792–793	148	May 9, 2018	978-1846538940
Venom Vol. 4: The Nativity	Venom #161, #164–165, Amazing Spider-Man #362–363	112	September 25, 2018	978-1302909833
Venom & X-Men: Poison-X	Venom #162–163, X-Men Blue #21–22, Annual #1	136	June 5, 2018	978-1302912253
Edge of Venomverse	Edge of Venomverse #1–5	116	November 7, 2017	978-1846538568
Venomverse	Venomverse #1–5	116	December 27, 2017	978-1846538841
Venom Vol. 1: Rex	Venom (vol. 4) #1–6	136	December 4, 2018	978-1302913069
Venom Vol. 2: The Abyss	Venom (vol. 4) #7–12	136	May 7, 2019	978-1302913076
Venom Unleashed Vol. 1	Web of Venom: Ve'Nam #1, Web of Venom: Carnage Born #1, Web of Venom: Venom Unleashed #1, Web of Venom: Funeral Pyre #1	136	September 17, 2019	978-1302917234
Venom: War of the Realms	Venom (vol. 4) #13–16, Web of Venom: Cult of Carnage #1	112	September 24, 2019	978-1302916961
Venom Vol. 3: Absolute Carnage	Venom (vol. 4) #16–19, Web of Venom: Funeral Pyre #1	112	February 18, 2020	978-1302919979
Venom Vol. 4: Venom Island	Venom (vol. 4) #21–25	136	August 4, 2020	978-1302920203
Venom Vol. 5: Venom Beyond	Venom (vol. 4) #26–30, and material from Free Comic Book Day: Spider-Man/Venom (2020) #1	128	March 10, 2021	978-1302920210
Venom Vol. 6: King in Black	Venom (vol. 4) #31–35	192	August 25, 2021	978-1302926038
Absolute Carnage	Absolute Carnage #1–5	136	January 30, 2020	978-1302919085
King in Black	King in Black #1–5	144	July 13, 2021	978-1302925468
Venom by Donny Cates Vol. 1	Venom (vol. 4) #1–12	280	November 19, 2019	978-1302919672
Venom by Donny Cates Vol. 2	Venom (vol. 4) #16–25	240	February 16, 2021	978-1302923884
Venom by Donny Cates Vol. 3	Venom (vol. 4) #26–35 and material from Free Comic Book Day: Spider-Man/Venom (2020) #1	320	February 1, 2022	978-1302931926
Venom: Lethal Protector	Venom: Lethal Protector (vol. 2) #1–5	120	November 17, 2022	978-1302930271
Venom Vol. 1: Recursion	Venom (vol. 5) #1–5	144	April 5, 2021	978-1302932558
Venom Vol. 2: Deviation	Venom (vol. 5) #6–10	112	November 3, 2022	978-1302932565
Venom Vol. 3: Dark Web	Venom (vol. 5) #11–15	112	April 18, 2023	978-1302948498
Venom Vol. 4: Illumination	Venom (vol. 5) #16–20	112	September 5, 2023	ISBN 978-1302948504
Flash Thompson
Venom by Rick Remender Vol. 1	Venom (vol. 2) #1–5	120	October 5, 2011	978-0785158110
Spider-Island	Venom (vol. 2) #6–9, and Amazing Spider-Man #666–673, Spider-Island: Deadly Foes #1, and material from Amazing Spider-Man #659–660; 662–665	368	January 2012	0-7851-5104-4
Venom: Circle of Four	Venom (vol. 2) #10–14, 13.1–13.4	225	June 2012	0-7851-6450-2
Venom: The Savage Six	Venom (vol. 2) #15–22	184	October 2012	0-7851-5812-X
Venom by Rick Remender: The Complete Collection Vol. 1	Venom (vol. 2) #1–12, Venom/Deadpool: What If? #1	320	June 23, 2015	978-0785193524
Venom by Rick Remender: The Complete Collection Vol. 2	Venom (vol. 2) #13, 13.1–13.4, 14–22	344	August 5, 2015	978-0785193531
Venom: Devil's Pack	Venom (vol. 2) #23–25, 28–30	126	April 2013	978-0785161240
Minimum Carnage	Minimum Carnage: Alpha; Venom (vol. 2) #26–27; Scarlet Spider (vol. 2) #10–11, 12.1; Minimum Carnage: Omega	150	January 2013	0-7851-6726-9
Venom: Toxin With a Vengeance!	Venom (vol. 2) #31–35	112	September 2013	978-0785166924
Venom: The Land Where Killers Dwell	Venom (vol. 2) #36–42, 27.1	176	January 2014	978-0785166931
Venom by Cullen Bunn: The Complete Collection	Venom (vol. 2) #23–42, #27.1; Minimum Carnage: Alpha, Omega; Scarlet Spider #10–11	536	September 25, 2018	978-1302913649
Venom: Space Knight Vol. 1: Agent of the Cosmos	Venom: Space Knight #1–6	136	July 12, 2016	978-0785196549
Venom: Space Knight Vol. 2: Enemies and Allies	Venom: Space Knight #7–13	160	December 13, 2016	978-0785193531
Others
Dark Reign: The Sinister Spider-Man	Dark Reign: The Sinister Spider-Man #1–4	112	January 6, 2010	978-0785142393
Venom Vol. 1: Homecoming	Venom (vol. 3) #1–6	136	June 14, 2017	978-1302906023
Venom: First Host	Venom: First Host #1–5	112	January 1, 2019	978-1302913441
Spider-Man 2099 vs. Venom 2099	Spider-Man 2099 (vol. 1) #34–38, Special; Spider-Man 2099 Meets Spider-Man; material from 2099 Unlimited #9–10	280	April 30, 2019	978-1302916213
Ms. Marvel: Fists of Justice	Ms. Marvel & Venom #1 and Ms. Marvel & Moon Knight #1, Ms. Marvel & Wolverine #1	104	January 19, 2023	978-1302948382
All-New Venom: Who is All-New Venom?	All New Venom #1-10	232	January 6, 2026	978-1302968199

== See also ==
- List of Spider-Man titles
- Alternative versions of Venom
