= Venom (comic book) =

Several comic book series by Marvel Comics

- The cover of Venom: Lethal Protector #1, February 1993. The first Venom solo comic. Art by Mark Bagley.

Publication information
- Publisher: Marvel Comics
- Format: Ongoing series
- Publication date: (consecutive limited series); February 1993 – January 1998; Vol. 1: June 2003 – November 2004; Vol. 2: April 2011 – October 2013; Vol. 3: January 2017 – June 2017; Vol. 1 (resumed): July 2017 – June 2018; Vol. 4: July 2018 — July 2021; Vol. 5: October 2021 — November 2024; Vol. 6: December 2024 — present
- No. of issues: (consecutive limited series): 60; Vol. 1: 18; Vol. 2: 42; Vol. 3: 6; Vol. 1 (resumed): 16; Vol. 4: 35; Vol. 5: 39; Vol. 6: 18
- Main character(s): Venom symbiote Eddie Brock; Patricia Robertson; Flash Thompson; Lee Price; Dylan Brock; Mary Jane Watson

Creative team
- Written by: Daniel Way (vol. 1); Rick Remender and Cullen Bunn (vol. 2); Mike Costa (vol. 3); Donny Cates (vol. 4); Al Ewing, Ram V, and Torunn Grønbekk (vol. 5); Al Ewing (vol. 6)

Venom is the title of several American comic book series published by Marvel Comics focusing on the various heroic and villainous incarnations of the character Venom, which have usually consisted of a human host and amorphous alien being called a symbiote. The first incarnation of the character was the one created by the third and current human host to the symbiote (the first two being Spider-Man and Tel-Kar), Eddie Brock, and—since 2011—its fifth host, Flash Thompson, and—since 2024—its current host, Mary Jane Watson. Beginning with Venom: Lethal Protector, eighteen limited series following Brock's adventures were published monthly between February 1993 and January 1998. A monthly Venom series began publication in 2003, following a new character, Patricia Robertson, and a clone of the original symbiote. The series concluded in 2004 after 18 issues. In 2011 another monthly series, following the adventures of Flash Thompson, was launched. The series resumed with vol. 3, vol. 4, and vol. 5 from 2016 to 2024, and vol. 6 since 2024.

== Publication history ==
The first run of Venom titles consisted of eighteen limited series published consecutively, cover dated from February 1993 to January 1998. This limited-series run consisted of 60 issues altogether, effectively acting as an ongoing monthly series whose issue numbering reset with each story arc. The first limited series, Venom: Lethal Protector, was written by Venom co-creator David Michelinie and began the character's transition from unambiguous villain to anti-hero; the story also introduced the symbiote offspring (Scream, Phage, Riot, Lasher and Agony), who would recur in Marvel comics until the 2011 Carnage, U.S.A. limited series. Subsequent limited series included 1994's Venom: Separation Anxiety, which continued the story of Venom's offspring and spawned the 1995 "Planet of the Symbiotes" cross-series story arc; 1996's Venom: Along Came a Spider, which introduced symbiote anti-hero Hybrid; and 1997's Venom: On Trial, which saw Eddie Brock tried for his crimes as Venom. Also published during this time was the prequel one-shot comic Venom: Seed of Darkness #-1 (cover dated July 1997), following a pre-Venom Eddie Brock. Larry Hama wrote the most individual series with eight in total, including the 1997 final instalment Venom: The Finale which saw the symbiote apparently killed. According to editor Tom Brevoort, the series was cancelled because "The return on the book had declined to the point where any immediate financial reward was overshadowed by [then editor-in-chief Bob Harras's] discomfort with the character starring in his own title."

A new ongoing Venom series began in June 2003, written by Daniel Way. This series followed a new character, Patricia Robertson, and a clone of the Venom symbiote. Eighteen issues were produced by Way through November 2004, comprising the story arcs "Shiver" (#1-5), "Run" (#6-10), "Patterns" (#11-13), and "Twist" (#14-18).

In 2011, an ongoing Venom series began under writer Rick Remender with Spider-Man supporting character Flash Thompson in a leading role. The character regained the use of his legs while using the symbiote following their loss during his service in the Iraq War (as shown in The Amazing Spider-Man #574). The first issue introduced new versions of the villains Crime Master and Jack O'Lantern, who became recurring antagonists for Thompson. Issue #18 featured the return of Brock, who killed Hybrid and Scream in his crusade against the symbiotes and eventually bonded to the Toxin symbiote. The series was born after Thompson was first unveiled as the new Venom by writer Dan Slott in The Amazing Spider-Man #654. Remender was unsure how to develop the Thompson narrative until he realized that he was a tragic hero: a violent man, haunted by a drinking problem and physical abuse suffered at the hands of his father.

Slott suggested that the new Crime Master's secret identity would be Bennett Brant, the thought-dead brother of Thompson's then-girlfriend Betty. Remender and his co-writer Cullen Bunn developed the new character, with Bunn developing the idea of multiple Crime Masters existing throughout history. Thompson found an arch-rival in the new Jack O'Lantern, developed by Remender and artist Tony Moore. Remender decided that making him a parallel of Thompson would create a stronger nemesis; therefore, Jack was also given a traumatic childhood in which he was exploited by Crime Master. Venom #13 saw the first mini-event of the series: a crossover with the Red Hulk, X-23 and the new Ghost Rider. The event was initially conceived as a reunion of New Fantastic Four members Hulk, Wolverine, Ghost Rider and Spider-Man as part of a Venom-Wolverine crossover. As the idea developed with writer Jason Aaron, it was decided to incorporate those characters' legacy characters into the Red Hulk, X-23, the new female Ghost Rider and Thompson's Venom. Following the event, Thompson joined another Remender-written book (Secret Avengers).

Remender stopped writing Venom in August 2012 (after issue #22) to work on Captain America and the launch of Uncanny Avengers. He was replaced by Cullen Bunn, who had periodically worked as co-writer during Remender's term. The Venom character remained a member of the Secret Avengers, a series still written by Remender. In September 2012, Bunn said that Thompson would be moved from New York to Philadelphia from Venom #28. This relocation would allow the introduction of a new love interest, the superhero Valkyrie. Editor Tom Brennan explained, "His superhero career almost cost him everything...this is a good man with a troubled past who needed a fresh start...to take his next steps in becoming the hero he was born to be." Marvel editor Stephen Wacker said the location change reflected Marvel's desire to expand the Marvel universe beyond New York City. Bunn's run introduced the new character Mania, one of Thompson's students who is empowered by part of the Venom symbiote. In August 2013, Marvel announced that Venom would end with issue #42 in October 2013. Bunn was informed of the decision while writing Venom #31-#38, which he stated gave him time to bring some plot threads to a conclusion, but having originally outlined thirty issues worth of stories, there would be some ideas left to be told.

As part of the All-New, All-Different Marvel line-wide relaunch, a new ongoing title Venom: Space Knight was launched with writer Robbie Thompson and artist Ariel Olivetti. The series ran for 13 issues, cover-dated January 2016 to December 2016.

Venom: Space Knight was immediately followed by a new ongoing Venom series (beginning January 2017) written by Mike Costa, starring new Venom host Lee Price. After six issues, the series was re-numbered to #150 and Eddie Brock was brought back as Venom's host. During Costa's run on the ongoing Venom title, two Venom-centric comic events were published, both centred around five-issue weekly series written by Cullen Bunn: Venomverse (November to December 2017) and Venomized (June 2018). Costa's run ended with issue #165, after which he wrote the five-issue limited series Venom: First Host (October to November 2018).

As part of the Fresh Start line-wide relaunch, a new volume of Venom was launched (cover-dated July 2018, published May 9) written by Donny Cates. Event miniseries during this time included Absolute Carnage in 2019 and King in Black in 2020–21, both also by Cates. This volume concluded in 2021 with the end of Cates's run.

The fifth volume of Venom was written by Al Ewing, Ram V, and Torunn Grønbekk with art by Bryan Hitch, CAFU, Rogê Antônio, Ramón Bachs, Ken Lashley, Sergio Fernandez Dávila, Julius Ohta, and Rafael T. Pimentel. The first issue, cover-dated January 2022, went on sale November 10, 2021. It starred Dylan Brock, son of Eddie Brock, as Venom's new host while Eddie Brock establishes himself as the new King in Black following Knull's death.

The sixth and current ongoing volume of Venom (known as All-New Venom for its first ten issues) is again written by Al Ewing with art from Carlos Gómez. The first issue, cover-dated January 2015, went on sale December 4, 2024. It starred Mary Jane Watson, ex-girlfriend of Peter Parker and foster mother of Dylan Brock, as Venom takes on new golden colouring. From its eleventh issue onward, it returned to the original Venom numbering with "Issue #250".

== Limited series (1993–1998) ==
=== Venom: Lethal Protector (1993) ===
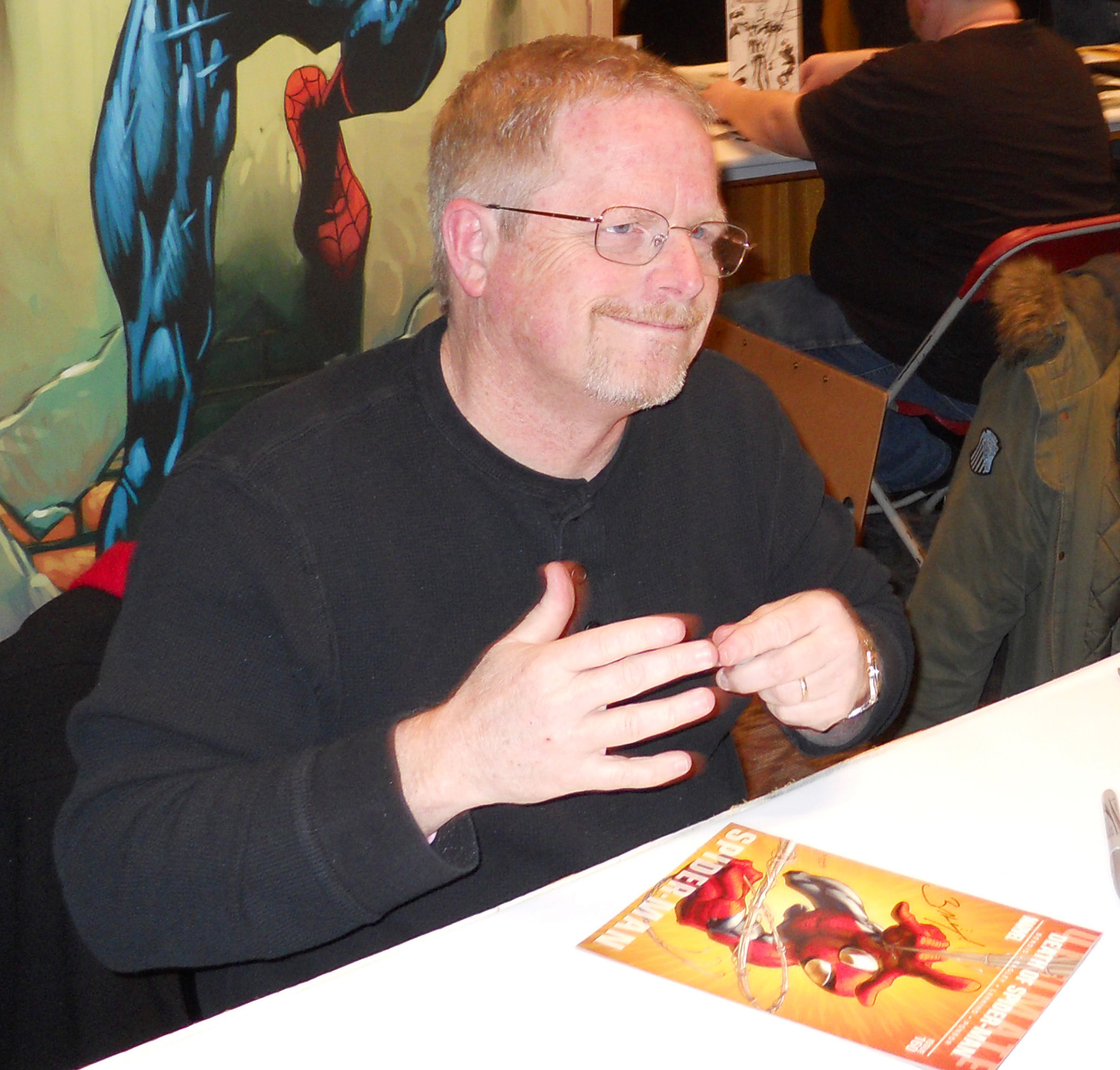
Mark Bagley provided art for the first three issues of Venom's inaugural title.

- Writer: David Michelinie
- Penciler: Mark Bagley (#1–3), Ron Lim (#4–6)
- Inker: Al Milgrom (#1–4), Sam de la Rosa (#1–6)

The initial six-part series was published between February and July 1993. The story follows former reporter Eddie Brock, (first introduced in Amazing Spider-Man #298 (March 1988) and as Venom in Amazing Spider-Man #299 (April 1988)) as a villain and enemy of the superhero Spider-Man. In his appearances in The Amazing Spider-Man, Brock blames Spider-Man for ending his career by debunking one of his stories. He bonds with the Venom symbiote, a sentient alien that had previously bonded with (and been rejected by) Spider-Man. Together, Brock and the symbiote become Venom. In The Amazing Spider-Man #375, Brock makes peace with Spider-Man after he saves Brock's wife (Anne Weying) from death. Brock then moves back to his home city of San Francisco for a fresh start, starting the events of Venom: Lethal Protector.

Venom: Lethal Protector initiated the character's transition from villain to anti-hero, and introduced several new characters (including Venom's symbiote offspring Scream, Phage, Riot, Lasher and Agony, who would recur in Marvel comics until the 2011 Carnage, U.S.A. limited series, and the vigilante group The Jury.

According to North American comic distributor Diamond Comic Distributors (DCD) and former distributor Capital City Distribution, Venom: Lethal Protector #1 was the bestselling issue of December 1992 and DCD's overall third-bestselling issue of DCD's bestselling 300 titles of 1992. On DCD's 1993 list, subsequent issues gradually dropped in sales: Venom: Lethal Protector #2 (placed at number 44), #3 (45), #4 (56), #5 (90) and #6 (120).

=== Venom: Deathtrap: The Vault (1993) ===
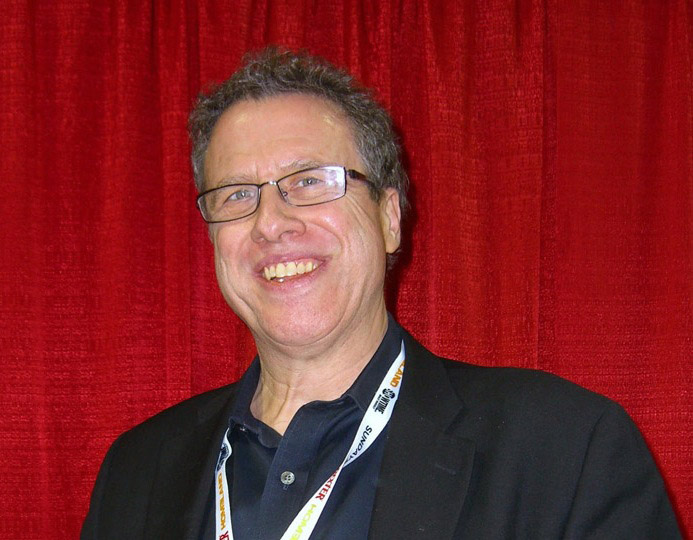
Danny Fingeroth

- Writer: Danny Fingeroth
- Penciler: Ron Lim
- Inker: Jim Sanders, Fred Fredericks

This one-shot issue was published in March 1993. The story was originally published in graphic-novel form in 1991 as Avengers-Deathtrap: The Vault (1991), but was later reprinted under the Venom label. As a result, the fictional events precede those of Venom: Lethal Protector and are referenced in that series. The issue follows a supervillain prison outbreak at the Vault, led by Brock, that allows the inmates to overrun the prison and take its staff hostage. The Avengers and Freedom Force attempt to defeat the villains in a race against time against the prison's final fail-safe, a powerful explosive device. DCD estimated that the comic was their 13th-bestselling trade paperback of 1993.

=== Venom: Funeral Pyre (1993) ===
- Writer: Carl Potts
- Penciler: Tom Lyle
- Inker: Scott Hanna, Al Milgrom and Joe Rubinstein

This was a three-part series published between August and October 1993. The story continued Brock's adventures in San Francisco, dealing with street gangs in an uneasy alliance with the Punisher, and saw the creation of the villain Pyre. According to DCD's 300 bestselling issues of 1993, Venom: Funeral Pyre #1 was number 72; sales declined for Funeral Pyre #2 and #3, which appeared at numbers 238 and 295 respectively.

=== Venom: The Madness (1993–1994) ===
- Writer: Ann Nocenti
- Penciler: Kelley Jones
- Inker: John Beatty (#1–3), Al Milgrom (#3), Keith Williams (#3)

A three-part series published between November 1993 and January 1994, the series introduces attorney Beck as a love interest for Brock. When Beck pursues a lawsuit against Scarmore Industries for employees poisoned by a sentient liquid-mercury virus, Venom is injured trying to protect her from the Juggernaut's kidnap attempt. The symbiote is submerged and infected with the sentient virus (which heals Brock), bonding with the pair and introducing a third mind into their relationship. The virus drives Brock insane (causing him to murder a cleaning lady), and he is physically transported to the realm of insanity to confront its avatars: Paranoia, Dusk and the Necromancer. The symbiote overcomes the virus; Brock regains his senses, and Venom is returned to earth. Beck later insists on only being Brock's friend, because his romantic feelings for her make him more violent. Among DCD's 300 bestselling issues of 1993 Venom: The Madness #1 was number 173; the remaining issues did not chart.

=== Venom: Enemy Within (1994) ===
- Writer: Bruce Jones
- Penciler: Bob McLeod
- Inker: Bob McLeod (#1–2), Harry Candelario (#3)

In a three-part series published between February and April 1994, Brock attempts to save San Francisco as it is besieged by an army of goblins. Morbius the Living Vampire and the Demogoblin are magically transported from New York; Morbius joins Brock to defeat the goblins, led by criminal-turned-politician Charles Palentine (who wears a magic necklace which controls the goblins). Palentine uses fear of the goblin attacks to seize control of the city and convince its citizens to burn it down. Demogoblin takes the necklace, and the liberated goblins attack Palentine. Demogoblin then leads the goblins across the Golden Gate Bridge, ordering them to leap to their deaths. Demogoblin and Morbius then leave for New York. Of DCD's 300 bestselling issues of 1994, Venom: Enemy Within #2 was number 286; the remaining issues did not chart.

=== Venom: The Mace (1994) ===
- Writer: Carl Potts
- Penciler: Liam Sharp
- Inker: Bill Reinhold

A three-part series published between May and July 1994, this series introduces the superhuman hit man Mace and the secretive Sunrise Society that created him. Continuing Brock's adventures in San Francisco, Venom: The Mace sees him confront (and later join forces with) Mace to defeat a squadron of Sunrise Society soldiers sent to capture Mace. A subplot involves some people Brock protects, who steal from the needy. When he learns what they have done, Brock promises Beck he will banish them from the community; he kills them instead, concealing the truth from her. According to DCD's 300 bestselling issues of 1994, Venom: The Mace #1 was number 255; the remaining issues did not chart.

=== Venom: Nights of Vengeance (1994) ===
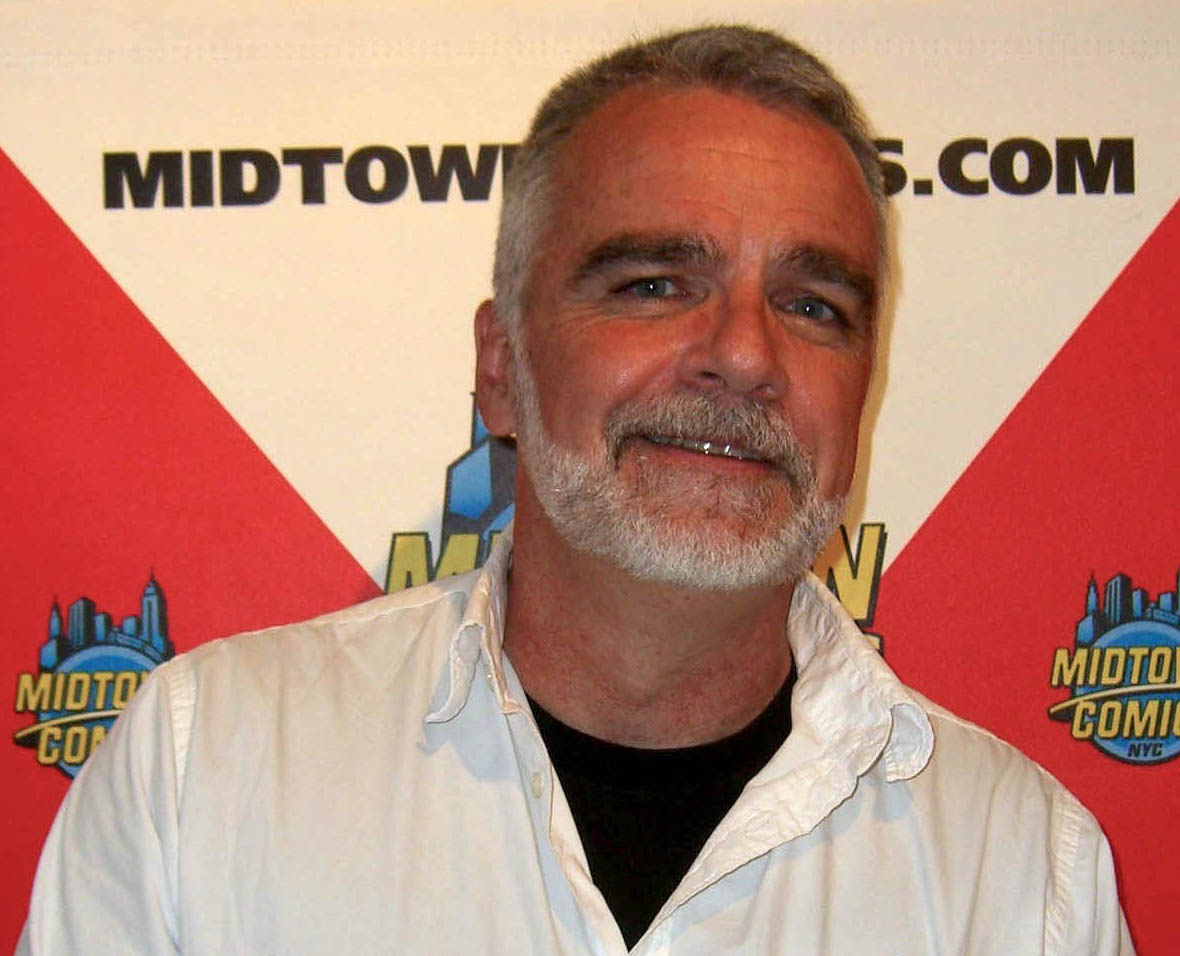
Howard Mackie wrote two Venom limited series (including 1994's Venom: Separation Anxiety), which led to the five-part 1995 "Planet of the Symbiotes".

- Writer: Howard Mackie
- Penciler: Ron Lim
- Inker: Al Milgrom

In a four-part series published between August and November 1994, Brock teams up with the anti-hero Vengeance to fight the Stalkers, a group of alien-technology-enhanced humans who have kidnapped Beck (and others) with Venom's protection. This series also introduces another romantic interest for Brock (Elizabeth, a doctor) in addition to Beck. It also begins a plot thread in which Brock is informed that there are other symbiotic hosts like himself.

=== Venom: Separation Anxiety (1994–1995) ===
- Writer: Howard Mackie
- Penciler: Ron Randall
- Inker: Sam de la Rosa

A four-part series published between December 1994 and March 1995, the story covers the return of Venom's offspring (Scream, Lasher, Phage, Riot, and Agony), who are seeking aid to control their symbiotes, and the murder of Lasher, Phage, Riot and Agony's hosts by Scream (who has become insane). The storyline also raised the question of whether Brock or the Venom symbiote was in control, leading into the five-part crossover story "Planet of the Symbiotes" in 1995.

=== Venom: Carnage Unleashed (1995) ===
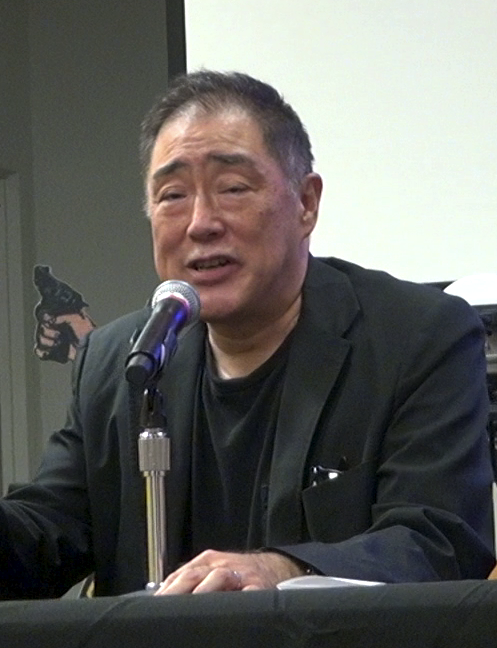
Larry Hama wrote eight Venom limited series between 1995 and 1998, including the concluding series Venom: The Finale (1997)

- Writer: Larry Hama
- Penciler: Andrew Wildman (#1-4), Art Nichols (#1-Finishes)
- Inker: Joe Rubinstein

In a four-part series published between April and July 1995, Brock returns to New York City in pursuit of supervillain Carnage after learning about Carnage Unleashed, a video game based on Carnage's rampage in Maximum Carnage (1993). Carnage discovers a method of transporting his symbiote through phone lines, which he uses to hack computers and attack people playing the game. He escapes from the Ravencroft asylum and kidnaps his caregiver, Dr. Pazzo. Venom confronts Carnage in cyberspace, before Pazzo douses Carnage in flammable liquid and sets him ablaze. Venom saves Carnage from dying, reasoning that death is what he wants. A subplot has Brock meeting Kirstin, a young musician. When Brock accidentally paralyzes her boyfriend Clive, Kirstin asks her mother to avenge him; this storyline continues in Venom: Sinner Takes All.

=== Venom: Sinner Takes All (1995) ===
- Writer: Larry Hama
- Penciler: Greg Luzniak (#1–4), Ted Halsted (#5)
- Inker: Scott Koblish (#1–2), Jimmy Palmiotti (#3, #5) Ken Branch (#3), Keith Aiken (#4), Jeff Albrecht (#4), Ralph Cabrera (#5)

A five-part series published between August and December 1995, it marks the first appearance of She-Venom after the symbiote bonds with Brock's wife Ann to save her from gunshot wounds. It also features the debut of a new Sin-Eater, Michael Engelschwert, following the death of the original. The story concludes the plotline begun in Venom: Carnage Unleashed with Kirstin's mother, a skilled assassin, trying to kill Venom and killing the Sin-Eater.

Each issue also contained an installment (or backup story) of the four-part "Tour of Jury Duty", detailing the initiation of former Vault guard Jennifer Stewart into the Jury as Wysper. She fights (and kills) the second Tarantula, a supervillain who murdered Wysper's husband during the riot in Venom: Deathtrap-The Vault. The series also features the return of the vigilante, Sentry.

=== Venom: Along Came a Spider (1996) ===
- Writer: Larry Hama
- Penciler: Joe St. Pierre (#2–4), Tom Grindberg (#2)
- Inker: Randy Emberlin (#1-2, #4), Mark McKenna (#2–4), Rodney Ramos (#2), Greg Adams (#2)

A four-part series published between January and April 1996, the story begins with the New York Police Department using Brock's wife, Ann, to trap him. Brock sends the symbiote to Ann, turning her into She-Venom again and letting her escape. In issue #3, Ann is afraid of the symbiote's influence and refuses to have anything to do with Brock while he wears it. This plotline is resolved in The Amazing Spider-Man Vol. 2 #19 (2000), in which Ann's experience with the symbiote triggers her suicide. The story includes contemporary Spider-Man Ben Reilly trying to bring Venom to justice.

The series also contained the four-part backup story, "Hybrid", with the Phage, Riot, Lasher and Agony symbiotes combining into a new symbiote which joins with former Vault guard Scott Washington to create the anti-hero Hybrid. The events of "Planet of the Symbiotes" take place during "Hybrid", with the defeat of the symbiotes in that story creating the Hybrid.

=== Venom: The Hunted (1996) ===
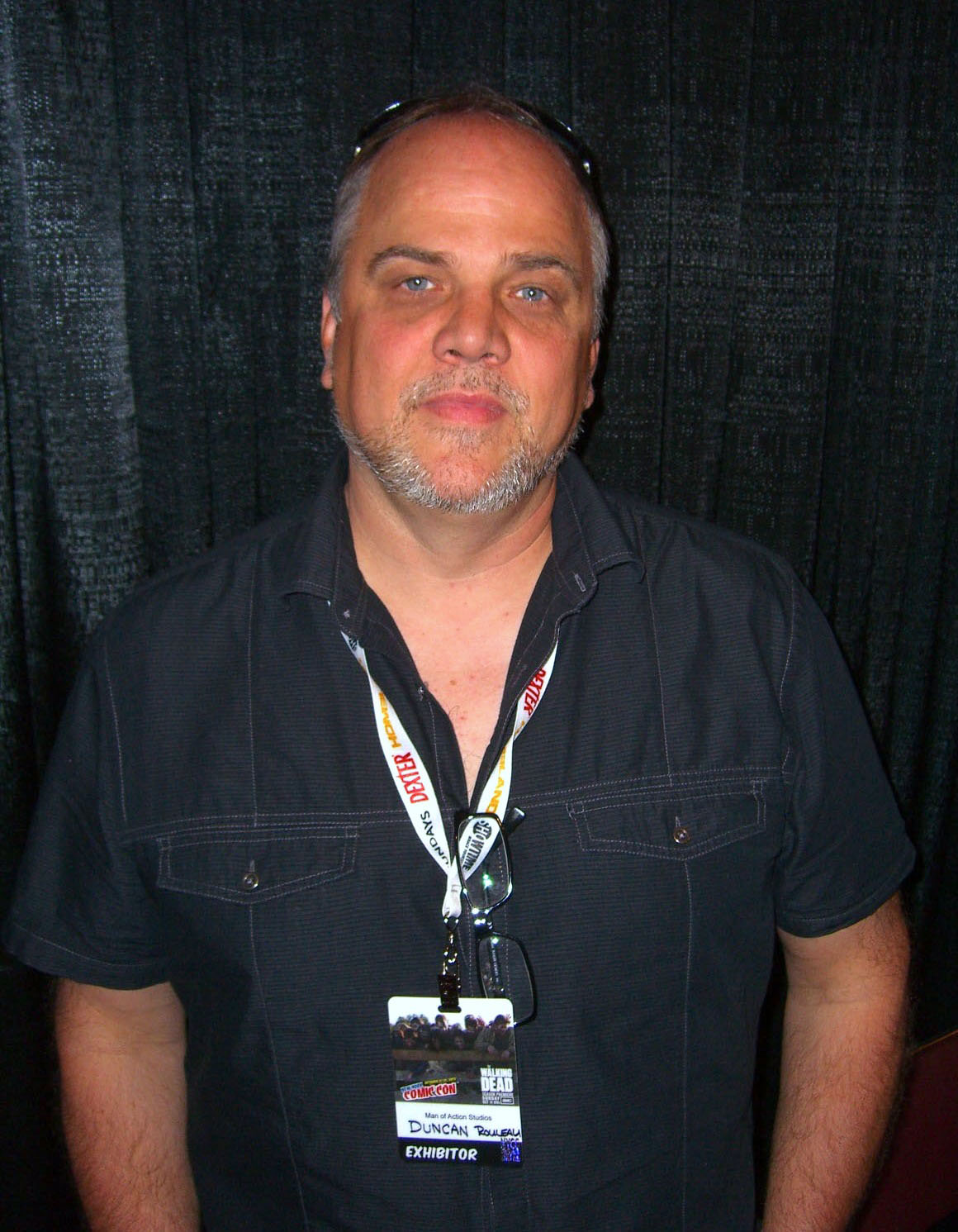
Duncan Rouleau provided art for Venom: The Hunted.

- Writer: Larry Hama
- Penciler: Duncan Rouleau
- Inker: John Stageland

A three-part series published between May and July 1996, it references the symbiote invasion in Planet of the Symbiotes as a symbiote-eating alien (the Xenophage) arrives on earth to hunt the remaining symbiotes. Scream returns as an anti-hero after the events of Venom: Separation Anxiety to protect the hosts of the invasion symbiotes. Venom is hunted by the police, who blame it for the murders committed by the Xenophage. Venom and Scream kill the Xenophage and escape their police pursuit.

The series contained a three-part backup story featuring Hybrid. He is captured by the Jury, now under the command of Orwell's son Maxwell and dealing with criminals through the legal process. Washington and his symbiote are put on trial as criminals. The Jury's guards include many of Hybrid's former co-workers, including Sentry. The New Warriors try to free Hybrid, who is ultimately released.

=== Venom: The Hunger (1996) ===
- Writer: Len Kaminski
- Penciler: Ted Halsted
- Inker: Scott Koblish

A four-part series published between August and November 1996, Venom: The Hunger introduces the Venom symbiote's reliance on phenethylamine for survival (which requires it to eat human brains after depleting Brock's supply of the chemical) and reveals that chocolate is a source of the chemical. Brock refuses to eat human brains; the symbiote abandons him, and he is locked in an asylum under the care of the deranged Dr. Paine. Brock escapes to hunt the symbiote, which has gone on a killing spree to obtain brains. He reunites with the symbiote (after finding that chocolate is an alternative source of the chemical), but Paine steals the symbiote for himself. Brock frees the symbiote, and again becomes Venom.

=== Venom: Tooth and Claw (1996-1997) ===
- Writer: Larry Hama
- Penciler: Josh Hood
- Inker: Al Milgrom

A three-part series published between December 1996 and February 1997, this marks the return of Scream; Wolverine and Venom collaborate against the villains Dirt Nap and Chimera. In the final issue, Scream and Venom begin hunting Carnage.

=== Venom: On Trial (1997) ===
- Writer: Larry Hama
- Penciler: Joe St. Pierre
- Inker: Derek Fisher

A three-part series, published between March and May 1997, which follows Brock as he is captured and tried for his crimes as Venom. Brock is represented by Matt Murdock (Daredevil), with Cletus Kasady (Carnage) testifying against him. After Kasady bonds again with his symbiote, Brock, Daredevil and Spider-Man unite to stop him. Before Brock can be judged, agent Daryll Smith (from an unknown agency) offers Brock amnesty in exchange for becoming an agent.

=== Venom: License to Kill (1997) ===
- Writer: Larry Hama
- Penciler: Derek Aucoin (#1–3), Josh Hood (#3)
- Inker: Rich Faber (#1–2), Ralph Cabrera (#1), Eric Cannon (#3), Scott Koblish (#3)

In a three-part series published between June and August 1997, the story continues with Venom as a government agent controlled by a bomb implanted in his chest. He is tasked with neutralizing biological-weapons expert Dr. Sergei Yesenofsky before he can release a deadly toxin. Yesenofsky's son Kostya sacrifices his life to divert a nuclear missile heading for Yesenofsky's base, and uses the explosion to destroy the toxin. Yesenofsky survives, swearing to avenge Kostya.

=== Venom: Sign of the Boss (1997) ===
- Writer: Ivan Velez, Jr.
- Penciler: Tom Derenick
- Inker: Chris Ivy

In a two-part series published between September and October 1997, Venom continues his career as a government agent, working as a bodyguard for foreign president Franco Santera. He confronts (and later joins forces with) Danny Ketch, the Ghost Rider.

=== Venom: The Finale (1997–1998) ===
- Writer: Larry Hama
- Penciler: Mark Pajarillo
- Inker: Robert Jones (#1–3), Pam Eklund (#3)

This three-part finale to the Venom series was published between November 1997 and January 1998. The Overreach Committee (the organization in charge of Brock's clandestine agency) decides to terminate him because of his brutal methods. Brock cuts the bomb from his chest, and uses it to escape. His escape brings him into a confrontation with Spider-Man. After a fight with Spider-Man and an injection of dopamine blockers by Agent Smith, Brock is separated from the symbiote (which is apparently killed when Brock is re-arrested). The final issue sees Brock recover some memory of his history with Spider-Man; he had lost his knowledge of the hero's secret identity in the Spider-Man: The Venom Agenda single issue (December 1997).

== Venom (vol. 1) (2003–2004) ==
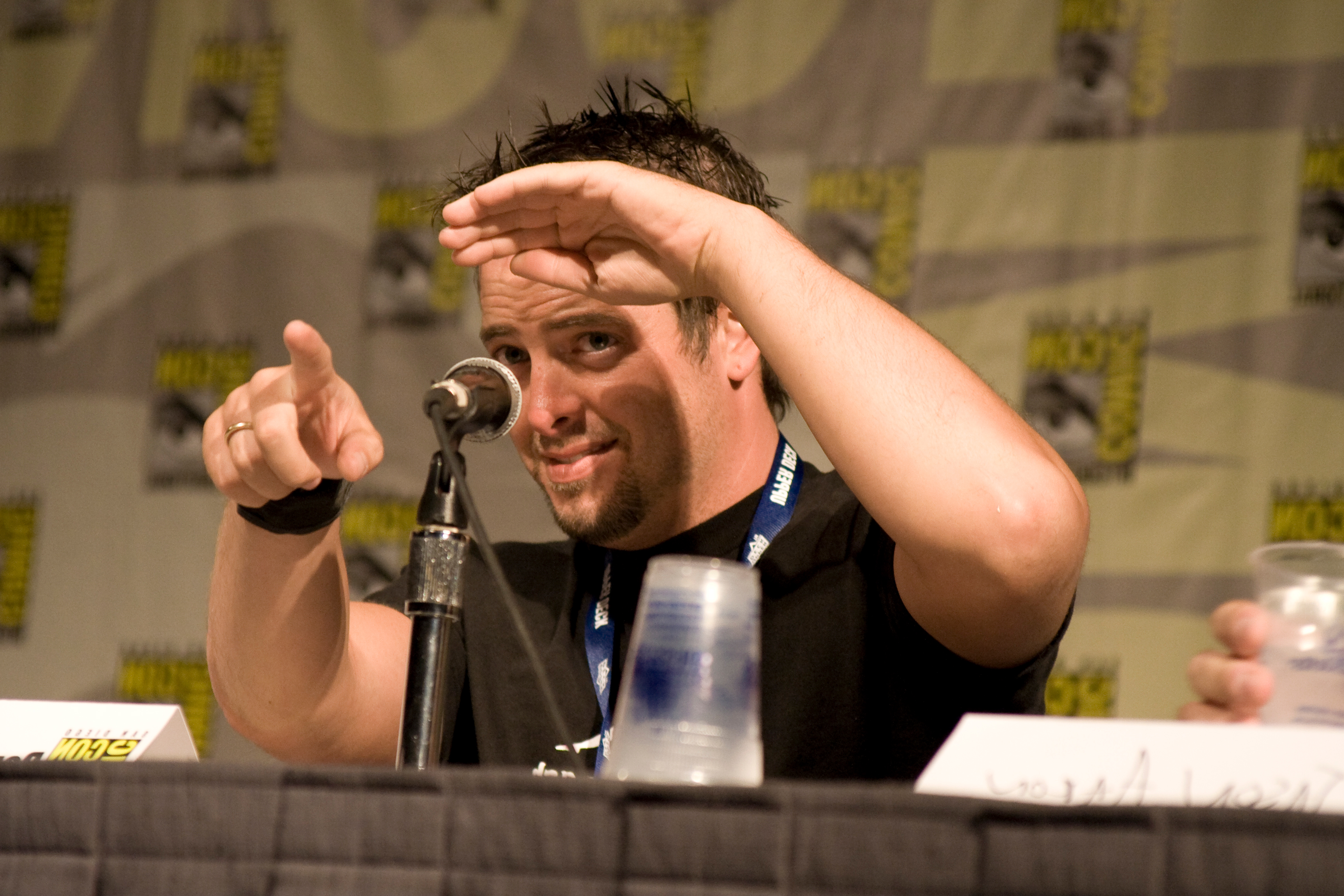
Daniel Way wrote the 2003–2004 series.

- Writer: Daniel Way
- Penciler: Francisco Herrera (#1–5, #11–13), Paco Medina (#6–10), Sean Galloway (#13), Skottie Young (#14–18)
- Inker: Carlos Cuevas (#1–5, #11–13), Juan Vlasco (#6–10), Wayne Faucher (#13), Rick Ketcham (#14–18)

An eighteen-issue monthly series, published under the Tsunami imprint between June 2003 and November 2004, follows U.S. Army communications specialist Patricia Robertson. During a supply run to an outpost owned by the Ararat Corporation, she discovers that all the scientists except one have been killed. The Ararat Corporation is run by an alien colony of miniature spider robots (led by an entity named Bob) that have infiltrated the U.S. government. The Ararat Corporation has cloned Venom to facilitate the extermination of humanity; however, the clone ravages its hosts and kills the outpost crew.

Robertson finds an ally in the Suit, a mysterious individual made of the same miniature robots as Bob (which were accidentally brought to earth by Reed Richards). The Suit modifies Robertson while she is unconscious, allowing her to control the clone if it bonds with her. The Suit sabotages Wolverine (the clone's preferred host), forcing it to bond with Robertson. One of Bob's agents convinces Robertson to kill the real Venom to save humanity, and she frees the incarcerated Venom. She and Venom fight, but Venom escapes. Bob remotely deactivates the technology allowing Robertson to control the clone, forcing her to rely on willpower to maintain control. Robertson and Venom again fight, and Venom absorbs the clone. Venom decides to carry out the mission given to the clone by the Ararat Corporation.

== Venom (vol. 2) (2011–2013) ==
=== Project Rebirth 2.0 (#1–22) ===
- Writer: Rick Remender
- Penciler: Tony Moore, Tom Fowler, Lan Medina
- Inker: Crimelab! Studios, Nelson Decastro

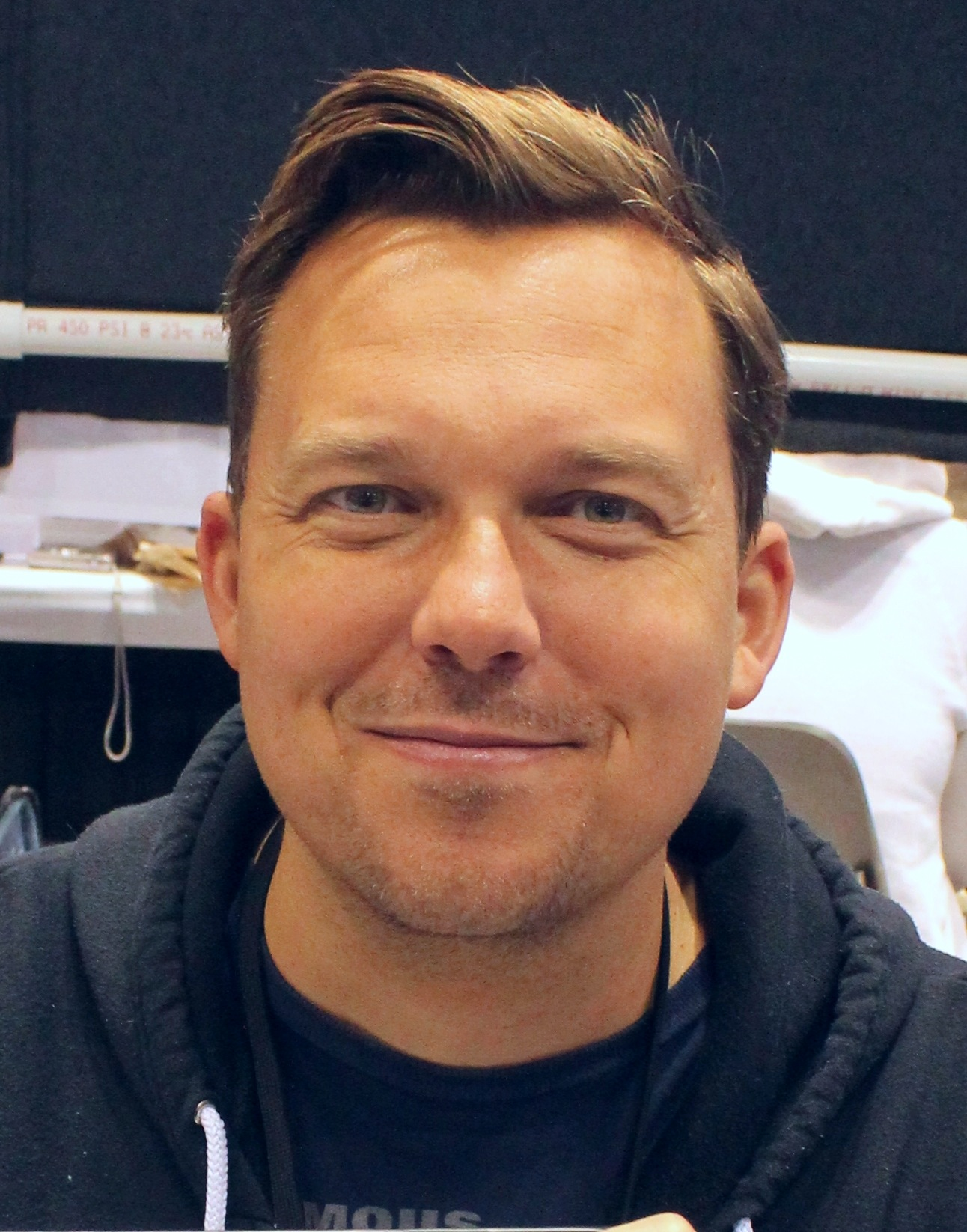
Rick Remender wrote the first 22 issues of Venom's 2011 series.

Published by Marvel Comics since 2011, the series follows Spider-Man supporting character Flash Thompson (who debuted as the latest Venom, an agent of the United States military bonded with the symbiote, in the February 2011 The Amazing Spider-Man #654). Recurring enemies Crime Master and Jack O'Lantern are introduced in Venom #1 and learn Thompson's secret identity in Venom #2, enabling them to threaten his loved ones in exchange for his cooperation. After Jack is disfigured by a grenade placed in his mask by Thompson, he considers himself Thompson's nemesis. The series' tie-in with the 2011 "Spider-Island" covered the death of Thompson's abusive father, Thompson facing the symbiote's former host Eddie Brock (Anti-Venom), the symbiote choosing Thompson over Brock and Thompson helping Captain America and Spider-Man defeat The Queen. The 2012 six-part story "Circle of Four" saw Thompson end his long-term relationship with Betty Brant for her safety; Venom joined the Red Hulk, Ghost Rider and X-23 to defeat Blackheart and the forces of hell (which are encroaching on earth). His performance results in Captain America recruiting him for the Secret Avengers in Secret Avengers #23 (April 2012) (also written by Remender). In Venom #15 (June 2012), Thompson had bonded with the symbiote to the point of lying for greater access to it.

The 2012 story "The Savage Six" sees the return of a symbiote-less Eddie Brock, who is intent on exterminating all of the symbiotes (resulting in the deaths of Scream and Hybrid). Crime Master forms the Savage Six: a team including Jack O'Lantern, Death Adder, Megatak and the Human Fly. Brock is involuntarily recruited onto the team after being possessed by the Toxin symbiote which Thompson stole for Crime Master in Venom #12. The Savage Six is sent after Thompson and his loved ones after he tries to murder Crime Master, resulting in Betty's learning Thompson's secret identity. Crime Master is ultimately unmasked as Betty's brother, Bennett Brant. Venom immolates Toxin and Brock, defeating Crime Master's remaining forces; Betty shoots Crime Master dead to save Venom. Venom later confesses his covert actions to the Secret Avengers. Jack O'Lantern escapes and goes on a killing spree to torment Venom, abusing his father's body; he is eventually defeated and incarcerated by Venom.

According to DCD, Remender's Venom #1 was the 128th-bestselling single issue of 2011 (based on an estimated 65,600 issues shipped). Venom #2 was number 389; sales dropped for each successive issue for the year, finishing at number 802 with Venom #11 (based on an estimated 28,700 issues shipped). Venom #22 (October 2012), Remender's final issue, sold an estimated 26,734 issues. The trade paperback Venom Volume 1 (Venom #1-5) was the 134th-bestselling trade paperback of 2012, followed by Circle of Four at number 359 and Savage Six at number 407. Venom #6-9 appeared in the Spider-Island trade paperback, which was listed at number 466.

=== Monsters of Evil (#23–42) ===
- Writer: Cullen Bunn
- Penciler: Thony Silas
- Inker: Nelson Decastro

Following Remender's departure from the series, co-writer Cullen Bunn took over beginning with issue #23. Bunn's tenure began with the "Monsters of Evil" arc explaining a villainous turn by Daimon Hellstrom in Bunn's Fear Itself: The Fearless, and continued a plot thread from Remender's "Circle of Four" arc which saw Venom, Hulk, X-23 and Ghost Rider unknowingly branded with Mephisto's mystical symbol (marking them as Mephisto's potential heirs). The mark gives Venom control over demons; after a demon tries to possess him it becomes trapped in Thompson's body, unable to leave or control him. Venom must contend with Hellstrom, who is possessing monsters with demons (creating an army to help him become Mephisto's chosen heir). Venom #23 (November 2012) introduced a new supporting character in journalist Kate Kiernan. The 2012 story "Minimum Carnage" saw the series cross with Scarlet Spider to feature Venom and Scarlet Spider against an escaped Carnage in the Microverse. The story concludes with Carnage defeated and lobotomized by Scarlet Spider, leaving the Carnage symbiote in control of his body and Venom able to sense Carnage's presence. The events of "Monsters of Evil", "Minimum Carnage" and his fear of the symbiote controlling him prompt Thompson to move to Philadelphia in Venom #27.1. Thompson is possessed by the demon inside him while he sleeps, and terrorizes people as Venom.

In Philadelphia, Thompson gains employment as a high school gym coach, while as Venom he comes into conflict with the U-Foes, who kidnap and experiment on victims with alien technology. When the U-Foes knock Venom, the demon takes control of his body and uses the alien technology to teleport the villains to their apparent death in space. Kiernan and Thompson's lover Valkyrie later return home, leaving Venom alone. Brock returns as Toxin in Venom #30, to pursue Thompson while he himself is hunting the result of one of the U-Foes experiments: an alien-lifeform infested human turned into a cannibal. Thompson and Brock's fight liberates the aliens who begin infecting and transforming other humans to target their new enemies: Venom and Toxin. Together, Thompson and Brock defeat the aliens, and afterwards Brock calls a truce with Thompson, promising that the Venom symbiote will inevitably take over Thompson, and that he will return to kill him when that happens. Venom #39 sees the return of Jack, and the introduction of the new symbiote character Mania—Thompson's teenage student Andi who bonds with a spawn of the Venom symbiote when Thompson uses it to protect her from Jack. Jack kills Mania's father, and is revealed to be merely a man who was brainwashed by some of Jack's technology into believing he is the real Jack. According to Bunn, when he envisioned a new symbiote character Andi was not intended to be the host, but as the series progressed his plans changed. It is revealed that Mania's symbiote is the cloned symbiote from Way's 2003 Venom series. The symbiote expelled the clone, and the demonic brand along with it, passing it to Mania. When a team led by Crossbones starts killing the brand bearers and taking the brands for themselves, Venom and Mania manage to fight them off with assistance from Mephisto. Mephisto then departs after telling Thompson that the deal he made in exchange for the brand was with the symbiote, not Thompson. The series ends with Thompson admitting that despite his issues with his father, he had always wanted to be a dad, and that he will now take responsibility for Benton.

== Venom (vol. 3) (2016–2018) ==
- Writer: Mike Costa (#1-6, #151-161, #164-165), Cullen Bunn (#162-163)
- Penciler: Gerardo Sandoval (#1–6, #151-154, #159-160), Tradd Moore (#150), Mark Bagley (#155-158, #164-165), Javier Garrón (#161), Edgar Salazar (#161-163), Ario Anindito (#161-163)
- Inker: Gerardo Sandoval (#1–6, #151-154, #159-160), Tradd Moore (#150), John Dell (#155-158), Scott Hanna (#156-158, #164-165), Javier Garrón (#161), Edgar Salazar (#161-162), Ario Anindito (#161-162), Allen Martinez (#163)

Part of the 2016 Marvel NOW! 2.0 relaunch, with new character Lee Price—a soldier turned mob enforcer—as the villain protagonist of the first six issues, following which the series was rebranded under legacy numbering and the symbiote was reclaimed by Eddie Brock, who attempts to use it to become a legitimate superhero. The series introduced the recurring supporting characters Doctor Steven—an astrobiologist working for Alchemax, and the chemokinetic Sleeper symbiote—an unexpected offspring of the Venom symbiote. A tie-in crossover with The Amazing Spider-Man (2015), called Venom Inc., saw the debut of Flash Thompson as Agent Anti-Venom; while another crossover with X-Men: Blue called Poison-X laid the groundwork for the Venomized event, the second part of the Venomverse saga. The Venom: First Host miniseries, released during Donny Cates' Venom run, served as an epilogue and revealed some of the Venom symbiote's pre-Earth history.

== Venom (vol. 4) (2018–2021) ==
- Writer: Donny Cates (#1-12, #16-35), Cullen Bunn (#13-15)
- Penciler: Ryan Stegman (#1–6, #9-11, #35), Iban Coello (#7-8, #13-15, #17-20, #26, #31-34), Joshua Cassara (#11–12), Juan Gedeon (#16, #26-28), Mark Bagley (#21-25), Luke Ross (#29-30)
- Inker: JP Mayer (#1–5, #11–13), Iban Coello (#7–8), Andy Owens (#21-25)

Part of the Fresh Start relaunch, with Eddie Brock as the focus and introduced both Dylan Brock, Eddie's son, and Knull, the King in Black and creator of the symbiotes.

== Venom (vol. 5) (2021–2024) ==
- Writer: Al Ewing (#1, 5, 8–10, 13–14, 16–22, 24–25, 29–30), Ram V. (#1-4, 6–7, 11–12, 15), Torunn Grønbekk (#23, 26–28, 31–32)
- Penciler: Bryan Hitch (#1-16), Cafu (#17-18, 20–21, 25, 29–30), Rogê Antônio (#19), Ramón Bachs (#22), Ken Lashley (#23, 25), Sergio Fernandez Davila (#24-25), Julius Ohta (#25)
- Inker: Andrew Currie, Pere Perez (#21)

The series follows Eddie as he becomes the new King in Black following Knull's defeat and Dylan as he becomes the new Venom.

== Venom (vol. 6) (2024–present) ==
- Writer: Al Ewing (#1–10, #250–256), Charles Soule (#257), Backup writers:, Charles Soule (#250), Tom DeFalco (#252), Jordan Morris (#252)
- Penciler: Carlos Gómez (#1–10; #250; #253–256), Paco Medina (#251–252), Javier Pina (#257), Cover artists: Adam Kubert (#1–10), Ryan Stegman (#250), Carlos Gómez (#251; #253–255), Giuseppe Camuncoli (#256–257), Backup artists:Terry Dodson (#250), Todd Nauck (#250), Ron Frenz (#252), Jesus Saiz (#252)
- Letterer: Clayton Cowles
- Colorist: Frank D'Armata

The series follows Dylan's foster mother Mary Jane Watson as she becomes the new Venom. The series was titled All-New Venom until its eleventh issue, after which it dropped the "All-New" and returned the original Venom. numbering for "Issue #250" onward.

== Collected editions ==
The series has been collected into trade paperbacks:

=== Venom (limited series) ===
Series	Volume	Release Date	Collected Material	Pages	Format	ISBN
Venom: Lethal Protector	1	October 19, 2011	Venom: Lethal Protector #1–6	144	Paperback	978-0-7851-5847-9

=== Venom (2003) ===
Series	Volume	Release Date	Collected Material	Pages	Format	ISBN
Venom: Shiver	1	July 1, 2004	Venom (2002) #1–5	120	Paperback	0-7851-1252-9
Venom: Run	2	October 1, 2004	Venom (2003) #6–13	192	Paperback	0-7851-1553-6
Venom: Twist	3	December 8, 2004	Venom (2003) #14–18	120	Paperback	9780785115540
Venom: Ultimate Collection	1	March 2, 2011	Venom (2003) #1–18	424	Paperback	0-7851-5704-2

=== Venom (2011) ===
Series	Volume	Release Date	Collected Material	Pages	Format	ISBN
Venom	1	October 5, 2011	Venom Vol. 2 #1–5	120	Hardcover	0-7851-5811-1
Venom	1	April 4, 2012	Venom Vol. 2 #1–5	120	Paperback	0-7851-5677-1
The Amazing Spider-Man: Spider-Island	-	January 25, 2012	The Amazing Spider-Man #666–673 and the "Infested" material from #659–660, Venom Vol. 2 #6–9, Spider-Island: Deadly Foes, and Spider-Island Spotlight	376	Hardcover	0-7851-5104-4
The Amazing Spider-Man: Spider-Island	-	September 12, 2012	The Amazing Spider-Man #666–673 and the "Infested" material from #659–660, Venom Vol. 2 #6–9, Spider-Island: Deadly Foes, and Spider-Island Spotlight	376	Paperback	0-7851-5105-2
Venom: Circle of Four	2	June 6, 2012	Venom Vol. 2 #10–13, 13.1–13.4, 14	232	Hardcover	0-7851-6450-2
Venom: Circle of Four	2	October 3, 2012	Venom Vol. 2 #10–13, 13.1–13.4, 14	232	Paperback	0-7851-6451-0
Venom: The Savage Six	3	October 31, 2012	Venom Vol. 2 #15–22	184	Paperback	0-7851-5812-X
Carnage: Minimum Carnage	1	January 22, 2013	Minimum Carnage: Alpha #1; Venom Vol. 2 #26–27; Scarlet Spider Vol. 2 #10–12; Minimum Carnage: Omega #1	152	Paperback	978-0785167266
Venom: Devil's Pack	4	April 30, 2013	Venom Vol. 2 #23–25, 28–30	136	Paperback	978-0785161240
Venom: Toxin with a Vengeance!	5	September 3, 2013	Venom Vol. 2 #31–35	136	Paperback	978-0785166924
Venom: The Land Where the Killers Dwell	6	January 7, 2014	Venom Vol. 2 #36–42, 27.1	136	Paperback	978-0785166931
Venom: Space Knight Vol. 1: Agent of the Cosmos	1	July 12, 2016	Venom: Space Knight #1–6	136	Paperback	978-0785196549
Venom: Space Knight Vol. 2: Enemies And Allies	2	December 13, 2016	Venom: Space Knight #7–13	160	Paperback	978-0785196556

== See also ==
- List of Venom titles
