= Toxin (character) =

Marvel Comics character

- Textless cover of Toxin #3 (August 2005). Art by Simon Bisley

Publication information
- Publisher: Marvel Comics
- First appearance: As Patrick Mulligan: Venom/Carnage #1 (September 2004); As Toxin: Venom/Carnage #2 (October 2004); As Eddie Brock: Venom #17 (May 2012); As Bren Waters: King in Black: Planet of the Symbiotes #3 (April 2021)
- Created by: Peter Milligan; Clayton Crain

In-story information
- Alter ego: Various hosts
- Species: Symbiote
- Team affiliations: As Patrick Mulligan: NYPD; As Eddie Brock: Savage Six, FBI, Symbiote Task Force
- Notable aliases: Son of Carnage
- Abilities: Superhuman strength, speed, agility, stamina, durability, endurance and reflexes; Organic "webbing"; Regenerative healing factor; Ability to cling to most surfaces; Limited shape-shifting, including the ability to shape-shift his limbs into weapons; Camouflage; Undetectable by Spider-Man's spider-sense, and untrackable by Venom and Carnage; Fangs and claws appear when he is angry or in danger

Toxin is a fictional character appearing in American comic books published by Marvel Comics. Created by writer Peter Milligan and artist Clayton Crain, the character first appeared in Venom/Carnage #2 (October 2004). He has been depicted as a superhero and at times a supervillain.

Toxin is the third major symbiote in the Marvel Universe, and the ninth one to appear outside of the "Planet of the Symbiotes" storyline. As the offspring of Carnage, the character possesses all the abilities of previous symbiotes and is naturally stronger than them. Unlike its sadistic parent symbiote, Toxin is not typically malicious and, when bonded to its first host—NYPD officer Patrick Mulligan—becomes a hero and ally of Spider-Man. Following Mulligan's death, the Toxin symbiote goes on to bond with Eddie Brock and, later, teenager Bren Waters.

Stephen Graham portrayed Detective Patrick Mulligan in the Sony's Spider-Man Universe films Venom: Let There Be Carnage (2021) and Venom: The Last Dance (2024).

== Fictional character biography ==
Toxin is the offspring of the Carnage symbiote. Carnage felt only dislike and hatred towards this new spawn, even before giving "birth" to it, both fearing that it could become much stronger, and being generally disgusted at the thought of giving birth. At the same time, Venom learns that Carnage is "pregnant" and resolves to protect its child. Venom was also concerned that, as the 1,000th symbiote of their line, the new symbiote could potentially become psychotic and violent because of genetic breakdown.

=== Patrick Mulligan ===
Patrick Mulligan is one of New York City's finest cops, yet troubled with various personal problems. His stressful job, along with the strain of his new family (his wife Gina was pregnant with their first son Edward), weigh heavily on him. One night while on duty, he encounters Carnage as it is giving birth. Carnage, needing a host to hide the symbiote, bonds it to Mulligan. Carnage resolves to kill Mulligan and the symbiote, but is unsuccessful.

After Carnage attacks Gina and Edward at their home, Mulligan realizes that the Toxin symbiote is a danger to both himself and his family. When it becomes clear that Toxin is easily as strong as either of his predecessors, and was still growing, Venom and Carnage form a temporary pact to destroy Toxin. After they fend off Venom and Carnage, Toxin has a conversation with Spider-Man, filling the latter in on what had happened. Spider-Man encourages Mulligan to harness his power for good.

Toxin starred in a six-issue Toxin limited series, which follows his battles with various supervillains who escaped from the Raft. The series also portrayed Mulligan's constant battle to keep the Toxin symbiote under control. At one point, trying to live with the Toxin symbiote became too much for Mulligan, who attempts suicide by throwing himself in front of a train. The Toxin symbiote intervenes at the last moment, saving Mulligan and claiming that he did not really want to die. Unlike the Venom and Carnage symbiotes, Toxin is unsure if it can survive on its own and find a new host.

After Razor Fist murders Mulligan's father, Toxin manages to control himself and turns Razor Fist over to the police. Mulligan reconciles with Gina by 'introducing' his estranged wife to the Toxin symbiote as a way of explaining why he walked out on his family. Mulligan and the Toxin symbiote cooperate peacefully with an agreement: Mulligan will be in complete control, if he allows Toxin two hours of "playtime" each night. But in those two hours, Toxin is not allowed to commit any acts of grand theft, arson, or homicide.

Mulligan is killed by Blackheart, resulting in the Toxin symbiote appearing in an underground lab in Las Vegas.

=== Eddie Brock ===
The Crime Master's underling Jack O'Lantern blackmails Flash Thompson into retrieving the Toxin symbiote. A fight with security personnel results in Jack O'Lantern taking the Toxin symbiote and fleeing. Blackheart is revealed to have bound pieces of the Toxin symbiote to clones of X-23, and also retained a small sample of the Toxin symbiote for use in a ritual to bring hell to Earth.

After killing Hybrid and Scream, Eddie Brock follows Venom into Crime Master's headquarters as part of his plan to destroy all symbiotes. During the ensuing fight between Venom and Crime Master's underlings, Crime Master locks Brock up and forcibly bonds him to Toxin.

Brock and the Toxin symbiote appear once more in the All-New, All-Different Marvel miniseries Carnage, where Brock serves in a task force led by John Jameson to track down Carnage. Toxin is considered "Plan B" to the force, and Brock's transformation into Toxin is manually controlled through a button.

After Carnage uses the Darkhold to resurrect Chthon, Eddie Brock ultimately sacrifices the Toxin symbiote in battle against him.

=== Bren Waters ===
Toxin returns during the King in Black tie-in miniseries Planet of the Symbiotes. Toxin has now bonded with a new host, teenager Bren Waters, the son of the new Guardsman (Ozkar Waters); the two have a brief scuffle.

== Powers and abilities ==
The Toxin symbiote possessed the special abilities of his two symbiote predecessors: he can stick to walls (which originally came from when Spider-Man was a host of the Venom symbiote), can change his identity to that of a completely different person, and also has unlimited webbing. With Patrick Mulligan as the host, Toxin is red from the abdomen up and black from the abdomen down. With Eddie Brock as the host, Toxin resembles a combination of Venom and Carnage but with the entire body red—light on the chest, and dark on the arms and lower body. Toxin can also blend in with his surroundings and become undetectable, an ability he gained from his grandfather Venom, and he can form solid weapons from his limbs, an ability first seen in his father Carnage. Toxin also seems to have some sort of quick-healing ability like his predecessors, as his wounds from his first battle with Razor Fist healed remarkably quickly. Unlike the others, Toxin can track anyone—not just other symbiotes or symbiote hosts—within the entire city of New York and possibly further, as long as he has something to begin from.

== In other media ==
=== Film ===
- Patrick Mulligan appears in Venom: Let There Be Carnage, portrayed by Stephen Graham. This version is a San Francisco Police Department detective who wears a hearing aid due to a past encounter with Frances Barrison while working as an officer. In the present, he attempts to use Eddie Brock to investigate Cletus Kasady and, after the latter escapes from prison, Mulligan tries to track him down before being kidnapped by Kasady and Carnage. During a confrontation between Venom and Carnage, Mulligan is apparently killed by Barrison. However, he absorbs a piece of the Carnage symbiote, which later revives him.
- Patrick Mulligan appears in Venom: The Last Dance, portrayed again by Stephen Graham. His symbiote left him for dead before Mulligan was subsequently apprehended by a group sent by the government organization Imperium, taken to Area 51, and bonded to a green symbiote. (Note: While neither symbiote is named on-screen, the official subtitles of the film's trailer call the green symbiote Toxin. The symbiote that saved Mulligan's life remains unidentified.) When the base comes under attack by Knull's Xenophages, the green symbiote sacrifices itself along with Mulligan to free Venom.

=== Video games ===
- The Patrick Mulligan incarnation of Toxin appears in Marvel War of Heroes.
- The Eddie Brock incarnation of Toxin appears as an alternate skin for Eddie Brock / Venom in Marvel Heroes.
- The Patrick Mulligan and Eddie Brock incarnations of Toxin appear as unlockable playable characters in Spider-Man Unlimited.
- The Bren Waters incarnation of Toxin appears as an unlockable playable character in Marvel Future Fight.

== Collected editions ==
Title	Material collected	Published date	ISBN
Toxin: The Devil You Know	Toxin #1-6	November 2005	978-0785118046
Extreme Carnage	Extreme Carnage: Toxin and Extreme Carnage: Alpha, Scream, Phage, Riot, Lasher, Agony, Omega	February 2022	978-1302932077
