= Venom War =

2024 Marvel Comics storyline

Publication information
- Publisher: Marvel Comics
- Format: Limited series
- Publication date: August – November 2024
- No. of issues: 5
- Main characters: Eddie Brock; Dylan Brock; Black Widow; Agent Anti-Venom; Carnage; Cletus Kasady; Daredevil (Elektra Natchios); Deadpool; Meridius; Misery; Spider-Man (Peter Parker); Silver Sable; Wild Pack; Wolverine; Venom; Venom Horse; Zombiotes

Creative team
- Written by: Al Ewing
- Penciller: Iban Coello

Venom War is a 2024 American comic book limited series and crossovers storyline published by Marvel Comics. It consists of a central, eponymous miniseries written by Al Ewing with art by Iban Coello and a number of tie-in books. The storyline follows the reigning King in Black Eddie Brock and his son Dylan (the current host of Venom) who, after seeing glimpses of each other's potential future, engage in a war to determine who will be the one true Venom. Meanwhile, artificial zombified symbiotes called Zombiotes attack New York.

Various issues of the series are dedicated to deceased Marvel employees Ray Chan, Don Perlin, and John Cassaday.

== Publication history ==
Marvel Comics released teaser art by Philip Tan showing Eddie Brock and Dylan Brock leading their symbiote armies in battle, with Agent Anti-Venom, Tyro, Wilde, Bedlam, and Meridius on Eddie's side and Black Widow, Sleeper, Red Goblin, and Flexo on Dylan's side.

"Venom War" was announced as a five-issue limited series written by Al Ewing which would tie into various tie-in issues and spinoff limited series debuting in August 2024. It is described as the fateful confrontation between father and son after going on separate journeys and realizing that only one of them can be Venom.

== Plot ==
=== Lead-up ===
During the 2024 "Blood Hunt" storyline, the Venom symbiote works with the zombified Lee Price and the Mania symbiote to defeat the Captive. Afterwards, Meridius appears and Price abandons Venom to merge with him. Before leaving, Meridius tells Venom that Eddie Brock is returning and that "Then the war can begin".

=== Prelude ===
Dylan Brock tells of how he went to a place beyond death and encountered a being who introduced itself as the Eventuality and spoke in his father's voice, telling him that he could ask it five questions. When he asked it if Venom reunited with Eddie, it showed him a vision of him as Venom defeating an opponent and stating "We are Venom". When he asked how to stop him, the Eventuality stated that he would know when he was older and he saw a vision of himself when he was older, telling Dylan that he would get through this.

Eddie Brock has become unstuck in time, along with Bedlam, Meridius, Tyro, and Wilde. Meridius tries to kill Eddie, but Tyro transports the former to prehistoric times, where he bonds with a Tyrannosaurus. While Eddie states that they will find Meridius again, Tyro tells him that he may find them first. Knowing that if Dylan keeps Venom, Earth will become Venom in the future that Meridius was trying to create, Eddie nominates himself to help set him straight since he is the only one with a body. Back in the present, Venom reveals that Lee Price has been revived as a zombiote and arrives at Peter Parker's apartment. After Dylan has a nightmare about Doctor Doom, he is visited by his future self, who he initially believes to be Eddie.

After shooting Carnage with a mysterious anti-symbiote weapon, Flash Thompson confronts Liz Allan, who has become Misery after bonding with parts of Carnage and Anti-Venom. She tells him that she will explain the Misery symbiote to him later, as they must flee before the police arrive. The next day, Flash attends a support group and receives a call from someone who invites him out for a drink as Carnage reunites with Cletus Kasady's clone. At a pub, Flash meets with Liz, who tells him about Misery and why she was at the building where he fought Carnage, which has reformed over time. At Investar, Carnage massacres its employees and, two weeks later, attacks a crowd of his followers at Ashford Park as soldiers armed with anti-symbiote weapons attempt to kill him. Carnage abducts a soldier and learns that the "K-Chemical" weapons were made by Alchemax.

Meanwhile, Black Widow and the Widow symbiote infiltrate an Alchemax facility and steal a symbiote-killing serum.

=== Main plot ===
At Grand Garden Arena, wrestler Symbiote Smith issues a challenge to the Unlimited Class Wrestling Federation, with Crusher Hogan and Doc Sawbones serving as commentators. However, the match is disrupted when Eddie arrives and battles Smith. Eddie declares that the ring is now under the control of the Kings in Black, and that he will only relinquish control if they give him Dylan and Venom. Meanwhile, Dylan tries to connect with Venom while telling his future counterpart about his contact with the Eventuality. After his future counterpart fades away, Toxin approaches Dylan and tells him of the events at Grand Garden Arena; Bedlam, Tyro, and Wilde have bested Paladin and his mercenaries. At Alchemax, Liz Allan holds an emergency meeting with Carlton Drake and Meridius regarding Eddie and learns of Chemical K-43, which is toxic to symbiotes. Meanwhile, Peter talks to Venom, who explains that Eddie and Dylan are better off without him. Outside Grand Garden Arena, Eddie battles Paladin and his crew before confronting Spider-Man and Venom.

Meanwhile, Meridius and Carlton Drake use the K-Chemical to create zombified symbiotes, dubbed "zombiotes". Meridius infects Drake with a zombiote and fends off Liz Allan before being approached by the Carnage symbiote, who had parted ways with Cletus Kasady's clone after a falling-out. At Grand Garden Arena, Eddie fuses with Bedlam, who devours Tyro and Wilde. Dylan similarly bonds with Sleeper and Flexo to battle him as the Prince in Black.

At Alchemax HQ, Meridius and Carnage are watching the Zombiote chaos unfold. Willie Lumpkin is among those infected by the Zombiotes. However, Agent Anti-Venom frees him and heads to Grand Garden Arena to make Eddie stand down. Flexo attacks Eddie, preventing him from healing properly, before Red Goblin removes him from Dylan. Flexo and Red Goblin are revealed to have been manipulated by Doctor Doom and Kang the Conqueror, with Kang creating the Rascal symbiote from a fragment of Bedlam. Venom leaves Spider-Man as pieces of it bond to Eddie and Dylan.

Agent Anti-Venom arrives, neutralizes Bedlam, and informs those present of the Zombiotes as they attack; Crusher Hogan and Doc Sawbones are converted into Zombiotes. The Anti-Venom symbiote moves to Eddie, who uses it to kill the Zombiotes. However, Meridius remotely possesses Eddie and the Zombiotes using Carnage's All-Blood the Necrospear, causing some of the Zombiotes to gain traits of Venom and Carnage. This forces Dylan to apparently kill Eddie.

Eddie survives, but is wounded and cut off from the powers of the King in Black. Meridius arrives and throws the All-Blood towards Eddie, only for future Dylan to arrive and shoot a bullet dubbed "Eganrac", the anti-Carnage, into his younger counterpart. This enables Dylan to withstand the All-Blood striking him as he assumes a golden form. Meridius attacks Dylan, but is killed by him. With Meridius' death, the Zombiotes die as well, while a zombified Lee Price looks outside his holding cell at Alchemax. Future Dylan disappears when his future is rewritten and Flash regains control of the Anti-Venom symbiote. However, Venom begins dying due to Eganrac's effects. Venom abandons Dylan to prevent him from dying as well and flees. Carnage —bereft of its godly powers with All-Blood's destruction—approaches Eddie, who is now only human and gravely wounded, and considers bonding with him to survive.

During the events of Venom War, a horse bonds with a copy of Venom. The horse, dubbed "Venom Horse", goes on a series of adventures of its own and ends up battling the Zombiotes. Crusher Hogan commentates on the Venom Horse fighting the Zombiotes and cheers him on.

== Issues involved ==
=== Prelude series ===
| Title | Issues | Writer | Artist | Release date |
|---|---|---|---|---|
| Free Comic Book Day 2024: Ultimate Universe/Spider-Man | 1 | Al Ewing | Iban Colleo | May 4, 2024 |
| Venom (vol. 5) | 35 | Al Ewing | CAFU | July 3, 2024 |
| Carnage (vol. 4) | 8 | Torunn Grønbekk | Pere Pérez | June 5, 2024 |
| Black Widow: Venomous | 1 | Erica Schultz | Luciano Vecchio | July 31, 2024 |

=== Main series ===
| Title | Issues | Writer | Artist | Debut date | Conclusion date |
|---|---|---|---|---|---|
| Venom War | 1–5 | Al Ewing | Iban Coello | August 7, 2024 | November 27, 2024 |

=== Tie-in issues ===
==== Limited series ====
| Title | Issues | Writer(s) | Artist(s) | Debut date | Conclusion date |
|---|---|---|---|---|---|
| Venom War: Spider-Man | 1–4 | Collin Kelly & Jackson Lanzing | Greg Land | August 14, 2024 | November 6, 2024 |
| Venom War: Venomous | 1–3 | Erica Schultz | Luciano Vecchio | August 21, 2024 | October 16, 2024 |
| Venom War: Carnage | 1–3 | Torunn Grønbekk | Pere Pérez | August 21, 2024 | October 23, 2024 |
| Venom War: Zombiotes | 1–3 | Cavan Scott | Juan José Ryp | August 28, 2024 | October 30, 2024 |
| Venom War: Wolverine | 1–3 | Tim Seeley & Tony Fleecs | Kev Walker | September 11, 2024 | November 13, 2024 |
| Venom War: Deadpool | 1–3 | Cullen Bunn | Rob di Salvo | September 18, 2024 | November 13, 2024 |
| Venom War: Lethal Protectors | 1–3 | Sabir Pirzada | Luca Maresca | September 18, 2024 | November 20, 2024 |

==== One-shots ====
| Title | Writer | Artist | Debut date |
|---|---|---|---|
| Venom War: Daredevil | Chris Condon | Lan Medina | September 25, 2024 |
| Venom War: Fantastic Four | Adam Warren | Joey Vasquez | October 30, 2024 |
| Venom War: It's Jeff | Kelly Thompson | Gurihiru | November 20, 2024 |

==== Series tie-in ====
| Title | Issues | Writer(s) | Artist(s) | Debut date | Conclusion date |
|---|---|---|---|---|---|
| Venom | 36–39 | Torunn Grønbekk | CAFU | August 14, 2024 | November 13, 2024 |

== Reception ==
In 2025, Kelly Thompson was nominated for the Eisner Award for Best Writer for her work on Venom War: It's Jeff #1 and other comics. The entire event received an average rating of 8.3 out of 10 based on 50 reviews.
