= Stegron =

Marvel Comics supervillain

- Stegron the Dinosaur Man, art by Angel Medina

Publication information
- Publisher: Marvel Comics
- First appearance: Marvel Team-Up #19 (March 1974)
- Created by: Len Wein (writer); Gil Kane (artist)

In-story information
- Full name: Vincent Stegron
- Species: Human mutate
- Team affiliations: Anti-Arach9; Savage Six
- Notable aliases: Stegron the Dinosaur Man
- Abilities: Genius-level intellect Ability to transform into a large bipedal Stegosaurus-like creature When transformed: Superhuman strength, speed, agility, reflexes, stamina and durability Sharp claws and teeth Spiked tail Ability to control or manipulate any dinosaur and the reptilian part of the brain in any life form Ability to drain life force from others through physical contact

Stegron (Vincent Stegron) is a supervillain appearing in American comic books published by Marvel Comics. Created by writer Len Wein and artist Gil Kane, he first appeared in Marvel Team-Up #19 (March 1974).

== Fictional character biography ==
Vincent Stegron is a S.H.I.E.L.D. agent who worked with Curt Connors to study DNA of dinosaurs from the Savage Land. Inspired by the experiment that turned Connors into the Lizard, Stegron steals dinosaur DNA and injects himself with it, transforming into a Stegosaurus-like creature. Stegron gains the ability to command real dinosaurs, and he plans to use them in his plans for conquest of the world and converting all of humanity into creatures like himself. Taking several dinosaurs with him from the Savage Land to New York City, he encounters Spider-Man, Black Panther, and Ka-Zar. In the ensuing battle, Stegron is knocked into a nearby river and seemingly drowns.

Months later, Stegron returns and blackmails Connors into helping him steal several dinosaur remains from a museum. Connors does what Stegron asks, but accidentally transforms into the Lizard. Stegron and Lizard battle until Spider-Man arrives. Some time later, Stegron is sent into hibernation by cold weather.

Stegron, now back in his human form, awakens from hibernation and wandered New York. During a battle between the Vulture and Spider-Man, Stegron regains his dinosaur form and powers and joins many of Spider-Man's enemies in an all-out battle to defeat him. Stegron is knocked unconscious and is taken in by authorities.

Stegron battling Spider-Man.

Stegron eventually returns to the Savage Land, where he takes over a S.H.I.E.L.D. installation. This draws the attention of Thunderstrike, Black Widow, and Black Panther. During the battle over the installation, Stegron was forced into an extremely cold environment and again went into hibernation.

Sometime later, Stegron awakens from his slumber and terrorized Roxxon Oil, which is illegally drilling in the Savage Land. Soon, Stegron is opposed by Ka-Zar, Shanna the She-Devil, and Spider-Man. During the battle, the Hulk and Chtylok arrive and help Stegron fight Roxxon. The other heroes join forces with Stegron when they realize he is trying to protect the Savage Land. Stegron scares the Roxxon agents away and is left in peace in the Savage Land.

Sometime later, Stegron (reverted to his human form) exiles himself to wander the Arctic Circle, where he finds the Rock of Life. Inspired by its de-evolving abilities, he takes it with him back to New York and slowly transforms back into his dinosaur form. Stegron then sends the Rock to a friend of his, who puts it on display at the Museum of Natural History. Stegron hopes that the rock will devolve the inhabitants of New York City into prehistoric creatures like himself with him as their leader. As a result, various heroes and villains with connections to the animal kingdom such as Spider-Man, Puma, Black Cat, Vulture, Lizard, Man-Wolf, and Vermin are affected by its power, causing an increase in their savagery. Spider-Man maintains control of himself and discovers Stegron's plans. With the help of Mister Fantastic and the Invisible Woman, Spider-Man stopped the Rock's powers from reaching others in New York, then beats Stegron into submission. The Fantastic Four place the Rock in a vault in the Baxter Building.

Stegron is returned to the Savage Land and encounters Devil Dinosaur, who had slumped into a depression after his companion Moon-Boy was kidnapped by S.H.I.E.L.D. agents. Fearing for Devil's life, Stegron leaves the Savage Land to wage war on S.H.I.E.L.D. Building an army of reanimated dinosaurs, Stegron attacks military bases while searching for Moon-Boy. Stegron is defeated and imprisoned, while Moon-Boy is returned to the Savage Land to be reunited with Devil Dinosaur.

Stegron later collaborates with Sauron in a plan to turn humanity into dinosaurs, battling Spider-Man and the mutant students from the Jean Grey School for Higher Learning. The duo's plans are unraveled by their own infighting, purposely exacerbated by their mutual crush Shark-Girl, who causes their powers to neutralize each other.

Stegron orchestrates a monster attack on a church. After Eddie Brock discovers one of Stegron's dinosaurs and delivers it to Liz Allan, CEO of Alchemax, he heads down the sewers and finds his lair, until he is spotted and captured. Venom escapes with help from Moon Girl and Devil Dinosaur, who were investigating the dinosaur attacks. When Venom and Moon Girl return to the hideout, Stegron takes control of Devil Dinosaur and sends him to attack them. Stegron revealed that he had been hired by Alchemax to find a way to have healing factors placed in humans, which led to him experimenting on homeless people and animals. Before Stegron can dump the dinosaur serum into the water supply, Venom and Moon Girl free Devil Dinosaur from Stegron's control and defeat Stegron, who is placed in Alchemax's custody.

In the "Hunted" storyline, Stegron is among the animal-themed characters captured for Kraven the Hunter's hunt. Arcade groups him and several of the other captives as the Savage Six.

== Powers and abilities ==
Stegron possesses superhuman physical abilities, as well as powerful claws and teeth and a prehensile tail. He also has the mental ability to control other reptiles. During their alliance, Sauron granted Stegron the ability to drain life force via physical contact.

Like other reptiles, Stegron is vulnerable to cold temperatures.

== Reception ==
- In 2020, CBR.com ranked Stegron 5th in their "Spider-Man: 10 Weirdest Animal Villains From The Comics That We'd Like To See In The MCU" list.

== Other versions ==
- Stegron makes a minor appearance in Marvel Adventures: The Avengers #33.
- An alternate universe version of Stegron from the Battleworld domain of Spider-Island appears in Secret Wars. After being infected with the Spider-Queen's Spider-Virus, he serves her until being freed by Agent Venom and a rebel movement.

== In other media ==
- Stegron appears in Marvel Avengers Alliance.
- Stegron appears in Marvel Super Hero Squad #6. This version is a paleontologist who was transformed by an Infinity Fractal.
