= Torunn Grønbekk =

Norwegian comic book writer and painter

- Born: Torunn Pettersen Grønbekk; September 16, 1984 (age 42) Jessheim, Akershus, Norway
- Area: Writer
- Notable works: Jane Foster: Valkyrie, The Mighty Valkyries, Punisher: War Journal, Carnage, Venom, Red Sonja, Catwoman

Torunn Grønbekk (born September 16, 1984) is a Norwegian comics writer, graphic designer, and portrait painter. She is best known for her work on Valkyrie, Punisher: War Journal, Carnage, Venom, and Thor for Marvel Comics, Catwoman for DC Comics, and Red Sonja for Dynamite Comics.

== Career ==
Grønbekk started her comics writing career in 2017 with the six-issue Caliber Comics series Ageless, and then in 2018 did Passed, a webcomic "about dead people," before self-publishing the crime comic Matriarch.

In 2020, Grønbekk was asked by Jason Aaron to co-write Jane Foster: Valkyrie #8–10. After the series was cut short at ten issues, the story was able to continue with the four-issue tie-in King in Black: Return of the Valkyries and the five-issue mini-series The Mighty Valkyries with artist Mattia De Iulis in 2021. These books introduced Rūna, a new Valkyrie based on Tessa Thompson's character from the Thor films.

In 2022, Grønbekk wrote Warhammer 40,000: Sisters of Battle, a five-issue mini-series set in the Warhammer 40K universe. The same year, she was announced as the writer for Jane Foster & the Mighty Valkyries, in which Jane Foster again wields Mjolnir. She teamed up with Jason Aaron again to write three one-shots during his Punisher series where Frank Castle was the leader of the Hand: Punisher War Journal: Blitz, Brother, and Base.

In February 2023, she took over writing Thor vol. 6 for issues 29–35. In July, she was announced as the writer for Dynamite Entertainment's new series of Red Sonja, alongside artist Walter Geovani, to coincide with Red Sonja's 50th anniversary. She was also announced as the writer for the four-issue Fall of X mini-series Realm of X. She also became the new co-writer for Venom vol. 5, alongside Al Ewing, where she wrote the Black Widow gaining access to a symbiote. She was announced as the new writer of Carnage with artist Pere Pérez where she wrote the four-part crossover with Venom "Symbiosis Necrosis."

In 2024, she was announced as the new writer for Catwoman as part of DC All In.

== Personal life ==
Grønbekk was born in Jessheim, Norway. She is a trained graphic designer and has worked in web technology and exhibition design. She also does oil portrait painting. Her father was named Tor after Thor and she was named after her father (Torunn meaning "the one who is loved by Thor").

== Bibliography ==
=== Marvel Comics ===
- Captain Marvel Annual vol. 11 #1 (2022)
- Incredible Hulk vol. 4 #19, short story "Night Eternal" (2024)
- The Punisher:
  - Punisher War Journal: Blitz #1 (2022)
  - Punisher War Journal: Brother #1 (2022)
  - Punisher War Journal: Base #1 (2023)
- Star Wars: Darth Vader -- Black, White, and Red #1, short story "Dissolution of Hope" (2023)
- Thanos: Death Notes #1 (2022)
- Thor and Valkyrie:
  - Valkyrie: Jane Foster #8-10, co-written with Jason Aaron (2020)
  - King in Black: Return of the Valkyries, co-written with Jason Aaron #1-4 (2021)
  - Mighty Valkyries #1-5, co-written with Jason Aaron (2021)
  - Who Is... Jane Foster: Thor Infinity Comic #1 (2022)
  - Jane Foster & the Mighty Thor #1-5 (2022)
  - Thor vol. 6 #29-35 (2022–2023)
- Venom:
  - Venom vol. 5 #23, 26-28, 31, 36-39 (2023–2024)
  - Carnage vol. 4 #1-8 (2023–2024)
  - Venom War: Carnage #1-3 (2024)
- Warhammer 40,000: Sisters of Battle #1-5 (2021)
- Wastelanders: Doom #1 (2022)
- X-Men:
  - X-Men Unlimited Infinity Comic #60-61 (2022)
  - Realm of X #1-4 (2023)

=== DC Comics ===
- Catwoman vol. 5 #69-present (2024–present)

=== Other Comics ===
==== AHOY Comics ====
- Project: Cryptid #3, text story "Partially Naked Came the Corpse! Part Ten" (2023)

==== Caliber Comics ====
- Ageless #1-6 (2017)

==== Dynamite Entertainment ====
- Red Sonja #1-present (2023–present)

==== Opus Comics ====
- Frank Frazetta's Death Dealer #5 (2022)

==== Rebellion Publishing ====
- 2000 AD #2362, short story "Anderson, Psi-Division: The Game Within" (2023)
- Battle Action #5, short story "Nina Petrova and the Angels of Death" (2024)

==== Self-Published ====
- Passed (webcomic) (2018)
- Matriarch (2019)

Preceded by Tini Howard	Catwoman writer 2024-present	Succeeded by N/A
Preceded by Al Ewing	Venom writer 2023-2024 (co-written with Al Ewing)	Succeeded by Al Ewing
