= Planet of the Symbiotes =

Marvel Comics story arc

- The Amazing Spider-Man Super Special #1 (April 1995): "The Far Cry", Part 1 of "Planet of the Symbiotes". Cover art by Steve Lightle.

Publication information
- Publisher: Marvel Comics
- Schedule: Monthly
- Format: Limited series
- Genre: Superhero
- Publication date: June – October 1995
- No. of issues: 5
- Main character(s): Eddie Brock; Venom; Spider-Man; Scarlet Spider; Carnage

Creative team
- Written by: David Michelinie
- Penciller(s): Ralph Cabrera (#1); Joe St. Pierre (#2); Kyle Hotz (#3); Darick Robertson (#4); Steve Lightle (#5)
- Inker(s): Dave Hoover (#1); Greg Adams (#2); Armando Gil (#3); Arne Starr (#4); Steve Lightle (#5)
- Letterer: Bill Oakley
- Colorist(s): Tom Smith (#1-4); Marianna Lightle (#5)
- Editor: Tom Brevoort

Collected editions
- Venom: Planet of the Symbiotes: ISBN 978-1302913656

"Planet of the Symbiotes" is a five-issue comic book story arc written by David Michelinie and published by Marvel Comics in 1995. The arc spanned the five "Super Special #1" editions of the Spider-Man titles available at the time: The Amazing Spider-Man, Spider-Man, The Spectacular Spider-Man, Venom, and Web of Spider-Man. The plot continued a narrative first published in the four-part limited series Venom: Separation Anxiety (1994) where doubt is placed in the mind of Eddie Brock about who is in control of the relationship between himself and the sentient Venom symbiote that grants him his powers.

The story centers on the invasion of Earth by an army of symbiotes and the efforts of Venom, Spider-Man, and Scarlet Spider to stop them.

== Story ==
Starting in the one-shot comic The Amazing Spider-Man Super Special #1 (April 1995), Eddie Brock contemplates his relationship with the Venom symbiote after seeing Riot, Phage, Lasher, Agony, and Scream struggle to control themselves against their own symbiotes. While teamed with Spider-Man against a terrorist group, Brock realizes the Venom symbiote is influencing him to kill. Spider-Man attempts to convince Eddie to abandon the Venom symbiote by blaming it for Brock's insanity. Brock forces the Venom symbiote to leave him, to allow him to think about the situation uninfluenced. Angry at being rejected, the Venom symbiote unleashes a powerful, telepathic scream that draws a spaceship of other symbiotes to Earth.

Continuing in the same issue, the symbiotes begin possessing random civilians and committing murders. Brock, believing the Venom symbiote is to blame, teams with Spider-Man and the Scarlet Spider to investigate. They eventually discover the symbiotes are creating a massive machine out of stolen Earth components. The three engage the symbiotes but find themselves overwhelmed. Scarlet Spider is revealed to be wearing a symbiote, which drags all three through the machine.

Following part 2 in the one-shot Spider-Man Super Special #1 (July 1995), the one-shot Venom Super Special #1 (Aug. 1995), finds the three on another planet, a world conquered by the symbiotes, the machine revealed to be a teleporter. The symbiote that had bonded with the Scarlet Spider is revealed to be Venom who again bonds with Brock. Venom conveys the history of the symbiotes as a race of creatures intent on taking over host bodies from other races in order to feel emotion. The Venom symbiote was considered an aberration for wanting to bond with a host instead of dominating them. Venom also reveals the symbiotes intend to conquer Earth next. Spider-Man, the Scarlet Spider and Venom escape through the teleporter to Earth, but are followed by the symbiote invasion force.

The Spectacular Spider-Man Super Special #1 (Sept. 1995) continues the story with a symbiote releasing the serial killer Cletus Kasady from prison, unleashing the bonded symbiote that makes Kasady into the supervillain Carnage. Carnage absorbs the second symbiote and becomes stronger as a result. Spider-Man, Scarlet Spider and Venom launch an assault against the symbiote invaders but are overwhelmed. As they are about to be defeated, Carnage appears, having grown to building-size proportions by consuming symbiotes.

The conclusion in Web of Spider-Man Super Special #1 (Oct. 1995) finds Carnage seeking out Venom to kill him. Spider-Man and Scarlet Spider fight Carnage while Venom attempts to create a more powerful telekinetic scream to subdue the symbiotes. Spider-Man and Scarlet Spider defeat Carnage and Brock fully bonds with his symbiote to create the necessary scream. The scream creates enough pain and despair that the symbiotes commit suicide. Venom decides he is content to be both Brock and the symbiote.

== Collected edition ==
A trade paperback book collecting the story arc was released in August 2018 under the title Venom: Planet of the Symbiotes.

== In other media ==
=== Television ===
Planet of the Symbiotes served as the inspiration for the Spider-Man episode "Vengeance of Venom".

=== Film ===
- Planet of the Symbiotes and Lethal Protector serve as the primary inspiration for the 2018 film Venom.
- Elements from the Planet of the Symbiotes serve as inspiration for the 2024 film Venom: The Last Dance.

=== Video games ===
- Planet of the Symbiotes is adapted as the eighteenth Spec-Ops Mission of Marvel: Avengers Alliance.
- Elements from the Planet of the Symbiotes were used in the 2023 video game Spider-Man 2, with Venom (Harry Osborn) infecting New York with symbiotes and Peter Parker and Miles Morales having to team up to stop them.

== See also ==
- List of Venom titles
- Venom: Separation Anxiety (1994–95)
- Venom: Along Came A Spider (1996)
- Venom: The Hunted (1996)
