= Marvel Super Hero Squad (comics) =

Comic book series

Marvel Super Hero Squad Super Hero Squad
- Categories: Action and Adventure
- Frequency: Monthly
- First issue: September 9, 2009 (as Marvel Super Hero Squad); January 13, 2010 (as Super Hero Squad)
- Final issue: December 16, 2009 (as Marvel Super Hero Squad); December 8, 2010 (as Super Hero Squad)
- Company: Marvel Comics
- Country: United States
- Language: English

Marvel Super Hero Squad is a comic book series based on The Super Hero Squad Show. The series lasted for 4 issues and then ended. Instead Marvel Comics started a monthly comic book series called Super Hero Squad.

== Issues ==
=== Limited series ===
1. Freaky Fractal Friday!
2. And Lo, There Shall Be a Reptil!
3. Imperius Wrecks!
4. Every Inhuman Has Its Day!

=== Monthly series ===
1. Issue 1 - The Super Hero Squad members are turned into babies.
2. Issue 2 - Enchantress and Mystique compete to win the hearts of the Super Hero Squad.
3. Issue 3 - When a tiny jellyfish is transformed into a giant slimy blob, the Super Hero Squad have their hands full trying to keep it from engulfing Super Hero City. Meanwhile, Thor reflects on his childhood.
4. Issue 4 - The Collector sends his minions to capture the Super Hero Squad and add them to his collection.
5. Issue 5 - Coinciding with the release of the World War Hulks event, this issue depicts an Infinity Fractal turning those exposed to it into Hulk-like forms.
6. Issue 6 - When an Infinity Fractal turns a paleontologist into Stegron, Speedball teams up with the Super Hero Squad when they venture into the Savage Land to stop Stegron from amassing a dinosaur army. Meanwhile, Doctor Doom sends Klaw to use his sound-based abilities to locate Infinity Fractals.
7. Issue 7 - Ringmaster hypnotizes the Super Hero Squad into thinking that they are performers in his circus, allowing Doctor Doom and the Lethal Legion to raid the Helicarrier.
8. Issue 8 - Discovering that different Fractals possess different qualities, the Super Hero Squad are stunned when one falls nearby and makes them overweight.
9. Issue 9 - She-Hulk, Tigra, and Wasp want to join up with the Super Hero Squad.
10. Issue 10 - The Super Hero Squad are celebrating Halloween when the Man-Thing attacks their party.
11. Issue 11 - In the wild west, the Super Hero Squad face off against a western version of Doctor Doom.
12. Issue 12 - The Super Hero Squad teams up with Santa Claus to make sure Christmas goes off without a hitch.
13. Marvel Super Hero Squad Spectacular - Beyonder has transported the Super Hero Squad and their enemies to his prison planet to do battle with one another.
