= Megatak =

Publication information
- Publisher: Marvel Comics
- First appearance: Thor #328 (Feb 1983)
- Created by: Doug Moench and Alan Kupperberg

In-story information
- Alter ego: Gregory Nettles
- Team affiliations: Savage Six
- Abilities: Electrical Power: creates video images in 3D, which can attack; can also inflict electrical damage by touch or blast

Megatak is a fictional character appearing in American comic books published by Marvel Comics.

== Publication history ==
Megatak first appeared in Thor #328 (February 1983), and was created by Doug Moench and Alan Kupperberg.

The character subsequently appears in Thor #358 (August 1985), in which he was killed by the Scourge of the Underworld.

== Fictional character biography ==
Megatak (Gregory Nettles) was an industrial spy. He was inside an experimental video display when he gained his powers. He was defeated by Thor and Sif, and Thor drained his electrical abilities.

When Megatak reappears in New York, he is gunned down by the Scourge of the Underworld disguised as a homeless man. Long after his death, he is among the eighteen criminals killed by the Scourge who are resurrected by the Hood using the power of Dormammu as part of a squad assembled to eliminate the Punisher. Megatak's powers have completely taken him over, transforming him into a living computer program.

He has since been recruited into the Crime Master's Savage Six to combat Venom.
