= Venom: Separation Anxiety =

Comic book limited series

- Cover to Venom: Separation Anxiety #1, "Apart", December 1994. Surrounding Eddie, left to right: Riot, Lasher, Scream, Agony and Phage. Art by Ron Randall

Publication information
- Publisher: Marvel Comics
- Schedule: Monthly
- Format: Limited series
- Genre: Superhero
- Publication date: December 1994 – March 1995
- No. of issues: 4
- Main character(s): Eddie Brock; Riot; Lasher; Scream; Agony; Phage; Venom

Creative team
- Written by: Howard Mackie
- Penciller: Ron Randall
- Inker(s): Sam DeLarosa; Rus Sever (#4)
- Letterer: Ken Lopez
- Colorist: Tom Smith
- Editor: Danny Fingeroth

Venom: Separation Anxiety is a four-issue comic book limited series published by Marvel Comics from December 1994 to March 1995.

The plot features Eddie Brock separated from his symbiote costume. It stems off from a Spider-Man arc also published by Marvel from November 1994 to December 1994.

== Plot synopsis ==
Eddie Brock and the alien symbiote are now held at very distant locations from one another. His five spawns created by the Life Foundation show up and bust Eddie out, because they want him to teach them how to control their symbiotes. They also take Daily Bugle reporter Ken Ellis (disguised as Eddie's doctor) hostage. The Venom symbiote also breaks free and escapes. It travels from host to host trying to find Eddie and rebond with him. Meanwhile, Eddie and Ellis escape, and, as the other five symbiotes try to find him, someone stabs and kills Agony. The others believe the murderer is Brock, and Phage convinces the others to find and kill him.

Eventually Eddie is found by the remaining Life Foundation symbiotes holding the body of another dead symbiote. The remaining symbiotes capture Eddie, trying one last time to convince him to help them, but then it is revealed that Scream (one of the Life Foundation symbiotes) is actually the murderer, having used a sonic knife to pierce the symbiotes and kill the hosts.

She announces that all symbiotes are evil and that makes the humans who bond with them also evil, and she intends to kill Eddie. She also reveals plans to track down and ultimately kill Carnage. But Brock's symbiote finds him in time, and the two rebond into Venom. They easily beat Scream, and she is arrested. Venom escapes before he is recaptured, having doubts in his mind about him being Venom.

== In other media ==
=== Video games ===
- In late 1995 a video game loosely based on the storyline was released, entitled Venom/Spider-Man: Separation Anxiety.

== See also ==
- Lasher
- List of Venom titles
- Riot
