= Venom: Lethal Protector =

Comic book series

- Cover to Venom: Lethal Protector #1, "Darksoul Drifting", February 1993. Art by Mark Bagley

Publication information
- Publisher: Marvel Comics
- Schedule: weekly
- Format: Limited series
- Genre: Superhero
- Publication date: February – July 1993
- No. of issues: 6
- Main character(s): Eddie Brock; Venom

Creative team
- Written by: David Michelinie
- Penciller(s): Mark Bagley (#1-3); Ron Lim (#4-6); Sam DeLaRosa (#4-6)
- Inker(s): Sam DeLaRosa (#1-3); Al Milgrom
- Letterer(s): Richard Starkings; Rick Parker (#3)
- Colorist: Marie Javins
- Editor: Danny Fingeroth

Collected editions
- Venom: Lethal Protector: ISBN 0-7851-0107-1

Venom: Lethal Protector is a six-issue comic book limited series featuring the Eddie Brock Venom, published by Marvel Comics from February 1993 to July 1993. It was written by David Michelinie and illustrated mostly by Mark Bagley, although Ron Lim and series inker Sam DeLaRosa pencilled the last three issues.

This marked the first time Eddie Brock received a series in which he was the main character, and showed Venom's progression from a villain to an antihero. Lethal Protector would serve as the first limited series to explore Eddie Brock's background before he became Venom. A "Gold Edition" was released at the same time as a dealer incentive, with a gold foil background instead of a red one. It was limited to a print run of 11,000.

== Story ==
Before the story begins, Venom makes an agreement with Spider-Man that they will leave each other alone, on the condition that Venom commits no crimes. Venom then moves from New York City to San Francisco, and takes up with a group of Californian mole people. Shortly thereafter, Orwell Taylor, the father of one of Venom's victims, seeks him out with a group of super-powered mercenaries to take revenge.

Spider-Man, seeing misleading coverage of Venom on television, heads to San Francisco to confront him and instead winds up fighting alongside Venom against five new offspring of the Venom Symbiote. Due to the symbiote's asexual reproduction abilities, the Life Foundation managed to extract "seeds" off Venom and accelerate them to become: Scream, Phage, Riot, Lasher, and Agony.

== Life Foundation ==
Run by Carlton Drake, the Life Foundation was an organization involved in illegal scientific studies bent on creating a futuristic utopian society that could withstand an apocalyptic event. Nearing the end of the Cold War, the foundation believed a nuclear holocaust would be the end result; destroying modern civilization. Their belief led to the creation of a large nuclear fallout shelter for their clients.

== Life Foundation symbiotes ==
Scream a.k.a. Donna Diego was hatched through an experimental procedure forcefully performed on Venom by the sinister Life Foundation. Before being chosen to host the symbiote, Donna Diego was a security guard for the Life Foundation ordered to protect the foundation's buildings and communities for a future utopia. To test her new abilities, she attacked a mall in Salinas, California. Spider-Man appeared and confronted Scream, but after a short battle, she fled and returned to the base in the Mojave Desert. Back at the base, Spider-Man battled Scream again and the other offsprings. Once Eddie Brock recovered his symbiote, he used a metabolic accelerator to speed up the symbiotes' age and turn them into dust.

Riot a.k.a. Trevor Cole was a mercenary hired by the Life Foundation to defend the foundation's future utopia. He volunteered to be one of the five symbiotes forcefully extracted by Venom. Along with the four other symbiotes, Riot confronted Spider-Man and Venom. After their confrontation, Eddie Brock recovered his Venom symbiote and used the metabolic accelerator to defeat the five by turning them into dust. Worse than his siblings, Riot was extremely aggressive and lacked any sense of sympathy. The Riot symbiote made its live action debut in the 2018 film Venom, serving as the main antagonist of the film.

Phage a.k.a. Carl Mach was a mercenary employed by the Life Foundation to serve as a "guardsmen" for the community the sinister company was preparing for. Proclaiming himself the leader of the five symbiotes, Phage and the rest of his "siblings" were forcefully extracted from a captured Venom. To test their new abilities, the offsprings battled Spider-Man while Venom was incapacitated. One unique attribute of Phage is his ability to throw projectiles from his symbiote and turn them into an acidic substance strong enough to melt through metal. Like his siblings, Phage met the same demise when Eddie Brock used the accelerator and defeated the offsprings.

Lasher a.k.a. Ramón Hernandez was a mercenary for hire employed by the sinister Life Foundation. Along with the other symbiotes, Lasher confronted Spider-Man and Venom. Defeating Spider-Man and Venom would serve as the final test for the five and would prove how effective they are as "guardsmen". However, once Eddie Brock and Venom were re-bonded, Venom used the metabolic accelerator to obliterate them into dust. Unique to Lasher, he possesses the ability to produce multiple tendrils and lash at his opponents.

Agony a.k.a. Leslie Gesneria was chosen by the Life Foundation to host a symbiote and become a "guardsmen" for the organization. With the combined efforts of her counterparts, Agony attacked Spider-Man and Venom. Not enough to thwart the heroes, Venom used the metabolic accelerator and sped up the symbiotes' age leaving their remains in dust. Agony possesses the ability to use her metabolism to produce an acid she can spit at her opponents. The acidic liquid can burn through almost anything.

== Collected editions ==
In July 1995, the series was collected in a trade paperback with new cover art by Simon Bisley (ISBN 0-7851-0107-1). In February 2011, the series was reprinted in a new second edition trade paperback, complete with a new cover (using the same cover art as issue #5 of the series) (ISBN 978-0-7851-5847-9). In February 2018, a new third edition trade paperback was released, now using the same cover art as issue #1 of the series as the book's cover (ISBN 978-1-302-91176-8).

== In other media ==
=== Film ===
- The Lethal Protector storyline serves as one of the two stories for the basis for the plot of the 2018 film Venom alongside "Planet of the Symbiotes" as confirmed by director Ruben Fleischer and actor Tom Hardy. However, despite Lethal Protector serving as one of the two storylines, the film does not include Spider-Man. As with the original comic, Venom is set in San Francisco, has the Life Foundation and Carlton Drake as antagonists, and includes the symbiote Riot.
- The 2021 sequel film Venom: Let There Be Carnage continues the storyline that began in the 2018 film. In Let There Be Carnage, Venom and Eddie Brock begin to accept their role as an antihero, referring to themselves as "The Lethal Protector" throughout the film.
- The final instalment of the trilogy, Venom: The Last Dance, concludes the storyline that began with the 2018 film.

=== Literature ===
- The storyline received a novelization in 2018 written by James R. Tuck, in compliments to the 2018 film. GraphicAudio released an audio adaptation of the novelisation in anticipation of the film.

== See also ==
- List of Venom titles
