= Savage Six =

Fictional comic book groups

The Savage Six is the name of two supervillain groups appearing in American comic books published by Marvel Comics.

== Publication history ==
The Earth-982 version of the Savage Six first appeared in Spider-Girl #25 and was created by Tom DeFalco, Pat Olliffe, and Al Williamson.

The Earth-616 version of the Savage Six first appeared in Venom vol. 2 #17 and was created by Rick Remender, Cullen Bunn, Kev Walker, and Terry Pallot.

== Fictional team history ==
=== Earth-982 ===
Savage Six

Publication information
- Publisher: Marvel Comics
- First appearance: Spider-Girl #25
- Created by: Tom DeFalco; Pat Olliffe; Al Williamson

In-story information
- Member(s): Funnyface; Dragon King; Killerwatt; Mr. Abnormal; Raptor; Sabreclaw

In the MC2 universe, the Savage Six is an alliance of Spider-Girl's enemies and is similar to the Sinister Six her father Spider-Man had faced.

The villain Funnyface gathers Spider-Girl's enemies Dragon King, Killerwatt, Mr. Abnormal, and Sabreclaw. After breaking Raptor out of prison, the group becomes the Savage Six. The Savage Six formulate a plan to destroy Spider-Girl, taking hostages from Midville High School to draw her out. Although Spider-Girl defeats Raptor, she learns that she has to fight the other members of the Savage Six in a series of predetermined locations before saving the hostages. Crazy Eight arrives at the scene and knocks out Funnyface, allowing the heroes to apprehend him.

=== Earth-616 ===
Savage Six
- The Savage Six (consisting of Crime Master, Death Adder, Human Fly, Jack O'Lantern, Megatak, and Toxin) looking at Venom as seen on the cover of Venom vol. 2 #21 (2012).

Publication information
- Publisher: Marvel Comics
- First appearance: Venom (vol. 2) #17 (July 2012)
- Created by: Rick Remender; Cullen Bunn; Kev Walker; Terry Pallot

In-story information
- Member(s): Crime Master; Death Adder; Human Fly; Jack O'Lantern; Megatak; Toxin (Eddie Brock)

In the Earth-616 reality, there are two different incarnations of the Savage Six:

==== Crime Master's Savage Six ====
The third Crime Master assembles Death Adder, the Human Fly, Jack O'Lantern, and Megatak to form the Savage Six, offering them protection from the law and the Kingpin. After a fight with Agent Venom, Jack O'Lantern discovers Eddie Brock webbed up as the Crime Master forcefully bonds Brock to the Toxin symbiote. The Savage Six targets the people Agent Venom cares about, including his family, Betty Brant, and her family.

When Betty is brought before the Crime Master, she is shocked when the Crime Master reveals himself to be her brother Bennett, who was thought dead. Agent Venom then arrives at the Crime Master's hideout, defeats Megatak, and severely burns Toxin. Bennett Brant almost kills Agent Venom with a sonic pistol and a flamethrower, but is shot and killed by Betty, who states that her brother "died a long time ago".

==== Hunted version ====
In the "Hunted" storyline, Kraven the Hunter has Taskmaster and Black Ant apprehend King Cobra, Rhino, Scorpion, Stegron, Tarantula, and Vulture; Arcade publicly brands them as the next Savage Six.

When Arcade's Hunter-Bots begin attacking the Savage Six and the other captured villains, the Savage Six manage to fend the off. The Savage Six escape after Kraven has Arcade deactivate the force field that he had set up around Central Park, deciding to stick together as a group.

== Members ==
=== Earth-982 membership ===
- Funnyface - Leader
- Dragon King
- Killerwatt
- Mr. Abnormal
- Raptor
- Sabreclaw

=== Earth-616 membership ===
==== First version ====
- Crime Master - Leader
- Death Adder
- Eddie Brock - Possessed by the Toxin symbiote
- Human Fly
- Jack O'Lantern
- Megatak

==== Second version ====
- Vulture - Leader
- King Cobra
- Rhino
- Scorpion
- Stegron
- Tarantula

== See also ==
- Sinister Six
- Sinister Syndicate
