= Scream (character) =

- Donna Diego as Scream in Venom: Separation Anxiety #4 (March 1995). Art by Ron Randall.

Publication information
- Publisher: Marvel Comics
- First appearance: Venom: Lethal Protector #4 (May 1993)
- Created by: David Michelinie; Ron Lim

In-story information
- Alter ego: Donna Diego; Patricia Robertson; Andi Benton
- Team affiliations: Sinister Syndicate
- Abilities: Alien symbiote grants: All powers of Spider-Man; Limited shapeshifting and camouflage; Symbiote's autonomous defense capabilities; Undetectable by "Spider-sense"

Scream is a supervillain appearing in American comic books published by Marvel Comics. The Scream symbiote has appeared in Spider-Man comics, as one of five symbiote spawns created simultaneously and has had four different types.

== Publication history ==
Scream first appeared in Venom: Lethal Protector #4 (May 1993), and was created by David Michelinie and Ron Lim.

== Hosts ==
=== Donna Diego ===
The Scream symbiote was one of the five symbiotes forcefully spawned from the original Venom symbiote, and was their unofficial Californian leader. Donna Diego was a volunteer for the Life Foundation, a survivalist group within the American government preparing both for the mutually assured destruction fallout of the Cold War and to provide a comfortable life for wealthy clients after the impending nuclear holocaust. Carlton Drake was experimenting with symbiotes in the hopes of creating so-called 'super-cops' to watch over the imagined fallout shelter utopia, and Diego was picked from the security force made up of police, soldiers and mercenaries. During Scream's first public appearance, she encountered Spider-Man while terrorizing a shopping mall near Salinas, California. Quickly bested by the more experienced fighter, Scream escaped in a hovercraft which returned to the Life Foundation's base. Unknown to her, Spider-Man had hitched a ride on that same hovercraft. Once Spider-Man helped Eddie Brock escape, Scream and the other guardian symbiotes, Lasher, Phage, Riot and Agony, then tangled with Spider-Man and Venom, but Venom turned an accelerated aging device on the five. The age-accelerating machine appeared to make the symbiotes age to dust before the Life Foundation blew up the base.

It was later revealed that Scream and her "siblings" survived, as the Life Foundation was able to save them and their symbiotes. For unknown reasons the guardians had a falling out with their employers and were now fugitives on the run. Scream led the others to New York City in search of Venom, hoping to help teach the five how to control their symbiotes, but Venom wanted nothing to do with them and battled Scream. When Venom disappeared, Scream attempted to enlist the Scarlet Spider to help find Venom. When Scarlet Spider refused, Scream experienced a psychotic break and began a rampage in Times Square. Humiliated when Venom ripped pieces of her symbiote off her and narrowly saved by the Scarlet Spider, Scream disappeared again.

Undiscouraged, Scream rounded up her "siblings" and broke Brock out of prison, kidnapping and imprisoning Brock in a Chicago warehouse. She once again asked for Brock's help in learning to communicate with the symbiotes. Brock once again refused and tried to kill them all, even without the Venom symbiote as back up. Brock escaped, and soon after the "sibling" symbiotes were murdered, one by one. Scream led them to believe that Brock was the killer, while in fact, it had been her the entire time. She had come to the conclusion that all symbiotes are evil, and those that bonded with symbiotes deserved to die. It was revealed that Diego was mentally ill and had been hearing voices long before she was the Scream symbiote's host. Brock managed to re-bond with the Venom symbiote before Scream could go for the kill. While unable to prevent her from murdering every other symbiotes' host, Venom was nevertheless able to beat her in combat yet again and Scream was taken in by the authorities.

Following the symbiote invasion of Earth, Diego was one of the few remaining symbiotes on Earth. Seeking to redeem herself for her crimes, she busied herself tracking down and helping benevolent symbiotic survivors. After her companions began dying mysteriously, Diego tracked Xenophage, a huge alien that devours both symbiotes and their hosts' brains. Diego assisted Venom in killing the Xenophage, but was gravely injured.

After her recovery, Scream sought out the Xenophage's hidden ship to help her track down more symbiotic survivors. The ship transported her and others (including Venom and Wolverine) into another dimension where Scream gets nearly killed once again by the villainous mutants Dirtnap and Chimera. Upon her successful return to Earth, she disappeared, presumably to continue her search for the few remaining symbiotes.

Scream appeared in two panels of the Marvel Super Hero Island Adventures comic giveaway from 1999, as she is shown to be a member of the Sinister Syndicate. She is referred to as Scream in the comics for the first time.

Scream is next seen investigating the murder of Scott Washington (aka the symbiotic hero Hybrid). She is trapped by Brock. With the Scream symbiote incapacitated by a sonic device, Brock uses a super-heated knife to kill Scream.

=== Patricia Robertson ===
The Scream symbiote (still bonded to Diego's corpse after absorbing her consciousness) is resurrected by Knull and goes to help Cletus Kasady harvest the codices of previous civilians who at some point had been bonded to symbiotes. Patricia Robertson (who had previously hosted a clone of Venom) later ambushes but the Scream symbiote decides to bond to her, leaving Donna's bones behind. Patricia struggles for control, but eventually the Scream symbiote forces Patricia to hunt other previous hosts.

=== Andi Benton ===
Persuading the Scream symbiote to resist Knull's control a second time, Patricia sacrifices herself in an attempt to save Andi Benton, and the Scream symbiote bonds to Andi. Transformed into a black-haired version of Scream, Andi breaks free of the meathook and feels the Scream symbiote healing her wounds; reveling in the power of being bonded to a symbiote once more. Andi notes that she can feel not only the Scream symbiote's mental voice, but those of Carnage's doppelgänger horde. She feels Carnage trying to compel her to obey, but sneers that she never liked doing what she was told. Snaring Carnage's arm with tendril-hair, Scream unleashes a torrent of hellfire from her maw - blasting Carnage in the face. Retorting that Carnage thought she would have remembered immunity to fire after their last encounter, Carnage attempts to impale the new Scream like with Patricia, but she leaps over her opponent. Lunging at her, Carnage impales Scream and snarls that he's the voice inside her head telling her to stay and die. Scream snares with tendril hair and slams Carnage into the dangling meat, Andi noting that even with a symbiote she's not powerful enough to fight. Lamenting that she hadn't even known Patricia's name before the Scream symbiote bonded to her, Andi vows not to let Patricia's sacrifice be in vain. Cocooning Carnage in her hair, Scream tosses Carnage into a meat locker, slams the door and flees. Smashing the door off its hinges, Carnage notes that Andi has escaped and grouses of having to wait for another rematch with her before turning to harvest the Mania and Scream codices from Patricia's corpse. The Scream symbiote later gets seemingly burned out within Andi because of the Carnage symbiote.

== Powers and abilities ==
Donna Diego's superhuman abilities stem from the Scream symbiote. Scream often uses her 'hair' as a weapon to wrap or tangle enemies (much like Medusa of the Inhumans), and can mimic clothing as camouflage. Like Spider-Man and the Venom symbiote, Scream has wall-crawling and web-slinging abilities, and boasts an early-warning sense. Scream also possesses some degree of superhuman strength but the exact limits of which are unknown.

== Reception ==
In 2021, Screen Rant included Scream in their "Spider-Man: 10 Best Female Villains" list.

== Collected editions ==
Title	Material collected	Published date	ISBN
Absolute Carnage: Scream	Absolute Carnage: Scream #1–3, Absolute Carnage: Separation Anxiety #1	January 2020	978-1302920159
Scream Vol. 1: Curse of Carnage	Scream: Curse of Carnage #1–5	August 2020	978-1302921002
Scream Vol. 2: Suffer the Children	Scream: Curse of Carnage #6–10	November 2020	978-1302924430
Extreme Carnage	Extreme Carnage Alpha #1, Extreme Carnage: Scream #1, Extreme Carnage: Phage #1, Extreme Carnage: Riot #1, Extreme Carnage: Lasher #1, Extreme Carnage: Agony #1, Extreme Carnage: Toxin #1, Extreme Carnage Omega #1	February 2022	978-1302932077

== In other media ==
=== Television ===
The Scream symbiote appears in the Spider-Man series finale "Maximum Venom", voiced by Meg Donnelly. This version is the older sister of the Venom symbiote who was created by Knull alongside Mania and Scorn.

=== Video games ===
- The Donna Diego incarnation of Scream appears as a boss in Spider-Man and Venom: Separation Anxiety.
- The Donna Diego incarnation of Scream appears as a boss in Marvel: Avengers Alliance.
- The Donna Diego incarnation of Scream appears as a boss and playable character in Spider-Man Unlimited.
- The Donna Diego incarnation of Scream appears as a playable character in Marvel Strike Force. This version is a City Controller allied with the Spider-Verse and Symbiote teams.
- The Andi Benton incarnation of Scream appears as a playable character in Marvel Future Fight, with Silence as an alternate costume.
- Scream appears as a boss in Spider-Man 2, voiced by Laura Bailey. This incarnation is bonded to Mary Jane Watson, having been created by Venom to distract Spider-Man. Scream feeds on her host body's repressed frustrations and anger until Spider-Man reconciles with her, weakening the symbiote enough for it to be removed from its host and killed.

=== Miscellaneous ===
The Donna Diego incarnation of Scream appears in The Amazing Adventures of Spider-Man, voiced by Candi Milo. This version is a member of the Sinister Syndicate.

=== Merchandise ===
Scream (Donna Diego) as an action figure released by Toy Biz.

- The Donna Diego incarnation of Scream received an action figure in Toy Biz's Venom: Planet of the Symbiotes action figure series, which originated her codename, though Marvel did not officially use it until 2007.
- The Donna Diego incarnation of Scream received a figure in the Marvel Legends line.
- The Donna Diego incarnation of Scream received a miniature on Jada Toys' Nano Metal Figs.
- The Mary-Jane Watson incarnation of Scream received a Funko Pop.
- The Patricia Robertson incarnation of Scream received two figures in HeroClix's Spider-Man and Venom: Absolute Carnage series.

=== Trading cards ===
- The Donna Diego incarnation of Scream, referred to simply as "Female symbiote", was featured in Marvel's comic book trading cards in the 1990s.
- The Donna Diego incarnation of Scream was featured in OverPower's "Mission: Separation Anxiety" series.
- The Donna Diego incarnation of Scream was featured in Marvel's Legendary: Venom deck building game, released in 2019.
