= Hybrid (Scott Washington) =

- Scott Washington as Hybrid. Artwork of the cover of Venom vol 4 #18 (September 2019). Art by Patrick Zircher and Brian Reber.

Publication information
- Publisher: Marvel Comics
- First appearance: as Scott Washington: The New Warriors #21 (March 1992) as Hybrid: Venom: Along Came a Spider #1 (Jan. 1996)
- Created by: Scott Washington; Fabian Nicieza (writer); Mark Bagley (penciller); Hybrid; Evan Skolnick (writer); Patrick Zircher (penciller)

In-story information
- Alter ego: Scott Washington
- Team affiliations: The New Warriors; The Guardsmen; NYPD
- Abilities: Alien symbiote grants: All powers of the predecessor's first human host, Spider-Man; Limited shapeshifting and camouflage; Symbiote's autonomous defense capabilities; Undetectable by Spider-Man's "Spider-sense

Hybrid (Scott Washington) is a fictional anti-hero appearing in American comic books published by Marvel Comics. Washington first appeared in The New Warriors #21 (March 1992) by writer Fabian Nicieza and penciller Mark Bagley. The Hybrid symbiote first appeared in Venom: Along Came a Spider #1 (Jan. 1996) by writer Evan Skolnick and penciller Patrick Zircher.

== Publication history ==
Created by writer Fabian Nicieza and penciller Mark Bagley, Scott Washington appears in The New Warriors #21 (March 1992), #25-26 and #36. In 1996, he is the main character Hybrid in the back-up stories in two miniseries Venom: Along Came a Spider and Venom: The Hunted, all written by Evan Skolnick.

In 2007, he is mentioned in Civil War: Battle Damage Report #1. Hybrid is also mentioned at the conclusion of the first issue of Carnage U.S.A. (2011), along with Venom, Anti-Venom, Toxin, and Scorn, as being the next option to stop Carnage's rampage in the Mid-west after the Avengers are defeated.

He has an entry in All-New Official Handbook of the Marvel Universe A to Z #5 - 'Gorgon to Jury' (2006) and an entry in The Official Handbook of the Marvel Universe A to Z HC vol. 05 - 'Guardsmen to Jackal (Warren)' (2008).

== Fictional character biography ==
Scott Washington was an African-American Guardsman involved in guarding and transporting Justice who had been arrested and sentenced to the Vault prison for supervillains.

The Hybrid symbiote is an amalgamation of four symbiotes (Riot, Phage, Lasher and Agony) into a single symbiote entity. The fused symbiote seeks out Scott in the Vault's lab facility. While guarding the symbiotes, Scott realized that they are not malevolent or a threat and that the experiments are causing the organism pain, so he lets it go. When his superiors discover that Scott had released the aliens he was supposed to guard, he is fired. Scott returns to the Bedford-Stuyvesant section of Brooklyn, the gang-torn neighborhood in which he grew up. Following a basketball court scuffle with the Eazy X gang, Scott and his brother Derek were shot: Derek was killed while Scott became crippled, losing the use of his legs.

The Hybrid symbiote located and bonded with Scott, which resulted in Scott regaining the ability to walk. As Hybrid, Scott enacts revenge on the Eazy X gang that had crippled him. Hybrid is targeted by the Jury, a group of vigilantes, before being rescued by the New Warriors. Justice offers Scott membership in the group, but he declined, citing more important work to do in his home neighborhood.

Scott Washington was considered as a "potential recruit" for the Initiative program.

Scott is hunted down and murdered by Eddie Brock as part of a goal to eliminate the symbiotes' "evil" from Earth. The Hybrid symbiote is later separated into the four symbiotes by a clandestine military group to be used by the U.S. government.

== Powers and abilities ==
Like Spider-Man and the Venom symbiote, Hybrid has wall-crawling and web-slinging abilities, and can form pseudopodia or tendrils to create snares and bladed weapons. Hybrid also has the ability to camouflage, such as its ability to mimic clothes on the person it has bonded with. It also has a border-line warning sense and can "see" through symbiote itself. Hybrid can also detach a piece of itself to send messages to allies, and can change shape to form a membrane that allows it to glide through the air. The Hybrid symbiote can also absorb various materials and chemicals, such as Spider-Man's webs.

Like the Venom and Carnage symbiotes, the Hybrid symbiote has superhuman strength and speed. With Scott Washington as its host, he regained his ability to walk which he had lost during a gang fight.

== In other media ==
Hybrid appears as a boss and unlockable playable character in Marvel Avengers Alliance.
