= Queen in Black =

2026 Marvel Comics event

- Publisher: Marvel Comics
- Publication date: July 2026
- Main characters: Hela; Knull; Venom (Mary Jane Watson); Dylan Brock; Iron Man; Beta Ray Bill; Defenders; Eddie Brock; Sigurd Jarlson

Creative team
- Writers: Al Ewing; Charles Soule; Tom Waltz

"Queen in Black" is a 2026 Marvel Comics crossover event. The storyline runs across a five-issue limited series written by Al Ewing and drawn by Iban Coello, supported by several tie-in books. It spins directly out of Ewing's runs on Venom and the Knull (2026) limited series, co-written with Tom Waltz. The story centers on Hela, the Asgardian goddess of death, who has imprisoned the symbiote god Knull and taken his title as the Queen in Black, then invades Earth with an army of alien species bonded to symbiotes. Knull, having escaped and claimed new power from the Lightforce dimension, wages a simultaneous counter-offensive.

== Publication history ==
The event's premise was established in Venom #250, an issue published in late 2025, written by Al Ewing and Charles Soule with art by Terry Dodson, Carlos Gómez, and Todd Nauck. Despite the issue's cover depicting Knull looming over Venom, the story depicted him already imprisoned by Hela using ancient magic to cage the weakened god, then donning a costume of black ichor and declaring herself the Queen in Black.

Marvel announced Queen in Black at New York Comic Con 2025 during the Spider-Man and His Venomous Friends panel, confirming that the conflict between Hela and Knull would form the basis of a summer 2026 comic-book crossover. At ComicsPRO in February 2026, Marvel confirmed Queen in Black #1 for release on July 1, 2026.

Ewing attributed the event's origin to the interaction of two separate ongoing storylines: "The two books have very different plotlines, but sometimes the plot of one book provides the opportunity to ramp things up in another one." The ongoing Thor (2025) storyline, in which Thor is dead and mortals have no living memory of the Norse gods, removed the divine opposition that would ordinarily check Hela's ambitions on Earth. Her seizure of Knull's symbiote power, Ewing noted, then fed directly into Venom.

Issue #1 ships as a 56-page debut at $7.99. A prelude story appeared in Amazing Spider-Man #1000/Queen in Black #1 CGD 2026, distributed as a Comics Giveaway Day special on May 2, 2026, written by Joe Kelly, Ewing, and Phillip Kennedy Johnson with art by John Romita Jr., Iban Coello, and Nic Klein.

Ryan Stegman, who co-created Knull with writer Donny Cates in Venom #3 (2018), drew the main cover for every issue. He also produced two homage covers for issue #1 based on his original Knull cover: one available at retail, one exclusive to Marvel's True Believers Blind Bags.

Several tie-in series were announced. Queen in Black: Defenders of Light and Dark (3 issues) is written by Tom Waltz with art by Zé Carlos, on sale July 8. The series follows two teams assembled specifically for the dual invasion. Beta Ray Bill leads Photon, Sunfire, and Dagger against Hela. Iron Man, in new Darkforce armor, leads Darkstar, Agent Anti-Venom, and Cloak against Knull. Waltz wrote: "We have assembled a rag-tag team of super heroes to serve as the first line of Earth's defense against the dual invasion threat of Knull and Lady Hela." Queen in Black: Venom Unchained (3 issues) is written by Charles Soule with art by Juanan Ramírez, on sale July 15. The series follows Eddie Brock attempting to escape prison after a failed re-bond with Carnage, without a symbiote. Queen in Black: Hela (one-shot) is written by Ewing with art by Carlos Magno, on sale July 8. Narrated by Karnilla of the Norns, it covers the events leading to Hela's imprisonment of Knull, including her presence in Midgard when Bifröst fell and the identity of the Thor who tried to stop her. Queen in Black: Thor (one-shot) is written by Ewing with art by Sergio Davila, on sale August 5. It follows Beta Ray Bill during the space battle against Hela, alongside Sigurd Jarlson (the reincarnation of Donald Blake). Venom #260, written by Ewing with art by Carlos Gómez, ships July 8. It continues the storyline in which Dylan Brock, following his death at Carnage's hands, received five answers to five questions from the Eventuality, a future iteration of his father Eddie Brock.

== Plot ==
=== Prelude ===
Hela has taken over Knull's territory and has imprisoned Knull following his resurrection. Knull escapes prison, kills the guards, and steals their symbiotes to remake his armor. Seeking to recapture Knull, Hela contacts Thanos for help. Having lost his powers to Hela, Knull travels into the Lightforce dimension and encounters the Illuminated, an alternate version of Eddie Brock who never became the King in Black. The two fight until Knull devours the Illuminated and takes his powers, donning white and blue armor. Knull begins his quest of reclaiming his symbiotes and remaking them in his image. He fights Thanos on top of the Sanctuary V, ending in Knull killing Thanos. Hela orders Tyr to have Daedalus 5 be evacuated as she plans to lead her forces in her invasion of Earth. Arriving on Gorr's homeworld, Knull amasses an army to invade Earth.

=== Main plot ===
At Avengers Mansion, Iron Man talks to Spider-Man, Agent Anti-Venom, and Captain Spider regarding Mary Jane Watson's Venom form. Watson states to Iron Man that he must help protect Dylan Brock if anything happens to her. Iron Man then speaks to the Avengers, the Fantastic Four, the X-Men, and Captain Alliance about Knull's return. Meanwhile, Knull is confronted by Nova over his crimes across the galaxy. Knull survives Nova's attack as the Xandarian Worldmind teleports Nova away. Having watched the fight, Hela and her forces close in on Earth. Spider-Man leads his allies and Captain Alliance in fighting Symbiote Legion Blue in New York City. Scarlet Witch and Vision battle Symbiote Legion Green in Giza, while Nova meets up with the Fantastic Four as he informs Iron Man of Knull's new powers. Cable tells Agent Anti-Venom that he has been drafted for another assignment, leaving Spider-Man and Captain Alliance to fight Hela's Skrull forces. Hela's Kree forces combine their technology with a symbiote to create the Symbiote Intelligence, a creature resembling the Supreme Intelligence.

At Avengers Mansion, Iron Man and Cable assemble the Defenders to combat Hela and Knull. At Hela's flagship, Tyr tells Hela to leave Beta Ray Bill to him as Hela states that she will investigate Sigurd Jarlson due to his connection to Thor. In London, Captain America leads the Avengers Emergency Response Squad against the symbiote-possessed Chitauri. At Hela's orders, the Symbiote Intelligence attacks Dylan Brock and traps him inside itself.

In Pisa, Captain Marvel, Emma Frost, Atlas, Giant-Man, and Goliath battle Symbiote Legion Purple who have taken the form of giant monsters and have toppled the Leaning Tower of Pisa. In New York City, Spider-Man's forces and Eddie Brock free Dylan from the Symbiote Intelligence. The Sleeper symbiote gives some of its power to Dylan to help Spider-Man's group incapacitate the Symbiote Intelligence. In Times Square, Human Torch, Captain Alliance, and Nova free Noh-Varr from a symbiote, only to be confronted by a symbiote-possessed Firelord.

Firelord fights Captain Alliance, Human Torch, and Nova as Thing comes to their aid. Nova harvests some of Human Torch's fire energy to charge up the Nova Force, freeing Firelord. At the Baxter Building, Mister Fantastic uses Dylan Brock and Venom to send out a signal that freezes the remaining symbiotes in place. Mister Fantastic then broadcasts that he has lost control of Venom, who envelops Earth. Mary Jane Watson speaks to everyone to stand together as a global consciousness, forming Venomworld.

The Defenders' plan to have Hela and Knull destroy each other in battle fails, with Knull killing Hela and reclaiming his original powers to become the King in All. He makes his way towards Earth but encounters Venomworld. Unable to physically destroy Venomworld, he enters its mindscape to destroy the Earth from with, where he encounters the consciousness of the gathered heroes. After defeating them, Knull believes that he can overcome Earth's population with how divided they are; however, Mary Jane Watson forces him to confront Venomworld's collective thoughts. Overwhelmed, Knull is consumed in an explosion, taking Venom with him but his defeat ends Earth's invasion. Some time later, Mary Jane Watson is deemed healthy by Mister Fantastic after running several tests on her, although he cannot determine how she survived without Venom keeping her alive. Meanwhile, Knull resurrects himself in the Un-Beyond, only to find that Sleeper has usurped his position as the King in Black.

=== Subplots ===
==== Defenders of Light and Dark ====
In a flashback, Iron and Cable assemble two Defenders strike teams, respectively consisting of Darkforce users and Lightforce users. (Note: As seen in Queen in Black #2.) Team Dark consists of Iron Man, Agent Anti-Venom, Cable, Darkstar and Cloak. Team Light consists of Beta Ray Bill, Dagger, Photon, and Sunfire. In the present, Bill leads Team Light in facing Hela's forces on her ship in Earth's orbit. Just beyond the Solar System, Team Dark confronts Knull and his army after teleporting to his base. Bill fights Tyr for Asgard's honor while Tyr fights for Asgard's return, intending to restore the Bifröst.

After Knull mortally wounds Cloak, which also causes the same injury to Dagger, Cloak and Dagger find themselves in the Taiji Threshold, where they encounter the In-Betweener. The In-Betweener explains that Knull's attack on Cloak has filled him with Lightforce energy and Dagger with Darkforce energy, threatening both their lives. With Knull's forces overwhelming them, Iron Man and Cable plan to initiate Plan B. Fighting their unraveling, Cloak and Dagger have their bodies healed as they gain new powers to turn the tide.

Hela confronts Team Light as Dagger protects Beta Ray Bill from Tyr, who is killed in the process. Iron Man gets the transmission from Bill to initiate Plan B, which will pit Hela and Knull against each other. A convoy of portals is opened by the Defenders' allies as Team Dark drags Knull into Earth's orbit. Both Defenders teams move aside as Hela and Knull fight. When Knull is defeated, the Defenders go on the attack, with Cloak, Dagger, and Bill striking down Hela. However, Knull reveals to have feigned his defeat and kills the weakened Hela to consume her powers, regaining his original power over darkness.

==== Hela ====
In a flashback, Karnilla looks into the future and forsees Thor being killed and the Bifröst being destroyed, causing the Asgardians to be forgotten. Arriving in Mephisto's realm, Hela cuts a deal with him for safe passage to Earth in exchange for preventing Sif from spotting Hela. Hela arrives in outer space and finds a powerless Knull, who forgets Hela's identity after the Bifröst is destroyed. Hela and Tyr are confronted by Roger Norvell, who is defeated by Tyr and taken to Hell by Mephisto as part of Hela's payment to him.

==== Venom Unchained ====
At the Raft, Eddie Brock is visited by public defender Jerry McLeod, who reviews his past as Venom. Nine weeks later, Brock is visited by Peter Parker, who is checking in on him. When the symbiote invasion begins, Brock tries to get a prison officer to contact the Avengers as the other inmates taunt him. This leads to a prison riot that ends with Brock in solitary confinement. Brock is approached by the Sleeper symbiote in the form of a cat. Brock escapes the Raft, but is briefly separated from Sleeper, who leaves to investigate something. Sleeper returns as Brock learns that the Symbiote Intelligence has captured Dylan Brock.

Sleeper wakes Eddie up as they find the Symbiote Intelligence and the Symbiote-possessed Kree on the ground. More Kree arrive as Sleeper fights them. Later that day, Sleeper explains his reason for breaking Eddie out of the Raft as they witness Venomworld being formed. Experiencing the memories of Venomworld, Sleeper explains that this was the reason why he broke him out of the Raft and wants him to show Venom the way. Eddie persuades Venom to let him help.

==== Thor ====
As Beta Ray Bill continues his fight with Tyr, (Note: As seen in Defenders of Light and Dark #1.) Sigurd Jarlson continues his daily life. When Tyr claims that Hela would restore Asgard if Bill joins them, Bill uses Stormbreaker's magic to take him and Tyr to a "place where time does not pass" to contemplate the offer. On Midgard, a disguised Hela looks into Jarlson rescuing a young girl from a burning building. This causes Hela to shed her disguise. During their parley, Bill sees through Tyr's manipulations and realizes that Hela plans to subjugate Earth to restore the Nine Realms, ultimately rejecting Tyr and sends them both back to their previous battle. Hela takes her leave as Jarlson calls for medical aid.

==== Venom ====
Dylan is trapped inside the Symbiote Intelligence, which accesses his memories. Dylan is contacted by Eddie Brock's possible future counterpart Eventuality, who states that Dylan is "dead" and assumes a human-like form. He states that Eddie Brock and Venom will reunite at a later point. Eventuality then shows Dylan a possible future where Hellgate returns to Earth and battles Spider-Man. Dylan remains trapped in the Symbiote Intelligence as Sleeper arrives.

Flashbacks reveal Venom's hatred towards Mister Fantastic, who helped forcefully separate Venom from Spider-Man when they initially bonded. In the present, Mister Fantastic gets Venom to stand down, intending to free the symbiotes from Hela's control and disrupt Knull's forces. When Spider-Man comes in, Mister Fantastic leaves to go meet up with Invisible Woman and Black Cat at the Fantastic Four's space station. Moments later, Mister Fantastic plans to jump-start Dylan's chainbreaker ability. However, the process goes awry as Venom grows out of control.

With Venomworld having been formed, Spider-Man, Mister Fantastic, and Dylan Brock explore the mindscape starting with Manhattan. Mary Jane Watson has coffee with Venom as they learn that Hela is dead. As Venom senses Eddie Brock, Mary Jane finds Knull emerging from the audience. He attempts to attack Mary Jane, but is overwhelmed by her memories. Some time later, Venom reunites with Eddie Brock.

==== Black Cat ====
Mister Fantastic and Invisible Woman task Black Cat with obtaining seeds from a Kree temple on a moon orbiting the planet Cyllandra to restore the Symbiote Intelligence to its original state. Upon arrival on the nameless moon, Black Cat quietly interrogates a servant on how to transport the Seeds of Intellect until one of its warriors show up. Black Cat escapes with the seeds to Earth, where Symbiote Legion Blue is carrying the unconscious Symbiote Intelligence. She drops the Seeds of Intellect on the Symbiote Intelligence, causing it to be overwritten and restored to the Supreme Intelligence. The Supreme Intelligence uses a special protocol to free the Kree from the symbiotes' control.

=== Aftermath ===
Sleeper compels all symbiotes to return to Klyntar. The Passenger symbiote, currently bonded to Boomerang, has been away from Klyntar for too long and is unable to contact the Sleeper symbiote to bring it back to Klyntar. Boomerang states that Passenger can remain with him until he can find a way to get it back to Klyntar. Boomerang begins dating community college professor Carla, who is revealed to have bonded to a symbiote dubbed Tantrum. Using a sonic boomerang, Boomerang takes down Tantrum, who manages to escape.

At Saint Patrick's Cathedral, Venom is visited by Spider-Man who noted what Eddie Brock had gone through. Brock later visits Mayor Luke Cage, who learns that he is bonded to Venom again. Cage brings in Spider-Man, Iron Man, Invisible Woman, and Wolverine as he explains to everyone that he is trying to help keep New York City safe. Later that night, Brock and Venom are visited by Yelena Belova.

At the Lower East Side, Davis Prescott is having dinner with his son when he collapses. When he wakes up in a tube, he is told by his captor that he has misused his power, money, and control, which will be rectified. Meanwhile, Mary Jane meets with Flash Thompson, revealing that she has started her own production company called Watson Productions and bonded with Fang, the spawn of Venom. Meanwhile, Prescott is briefly removed from his tube and learns that his captor is Chameleon.

== Issues ==
=== Prelude issue ===
- Knull #1-5

=== Main issue ===
- Queen in Black #1-5

=== Tie-in issues ===
- Black Cat (vol. 3) #14
- Queen in Black: Defenders of Light and Dark #1-3
- Queen in Black: Hela #1
- Queen in Black: Thor #1
- Queen in Black: Venom Unchained #1-3
- Venom (vol. 6) #260-262

=== Aftermath issues ===
- Amazing Venom #1
- Friendly Neighborhood Mary Jane #1
- Venom (vol. 7) #1
