= Sunfire (character) =

Marvel Comics fictional character

- Sunfire, as depicted in X-Men (vol. 2) #93 (August 1999). Art by Alan Davis.

Publication information
- Publisher: Marvel Comics
- First appearance: X-Men #64 (January 1970)
- Created by: Roy Thomas; Don Heck

In-story information
- Alter ego: Shiro Yoshida
- Species: Human mutant
- Team affiliations: Avengers Unity Squad; X-Men; Horsemen of Apocalypse; Death's Champions; Pacific Overlords; X-Corporation Mumbai; The Twelve; Big Hero 6 Marauders; Tiger Division; Defenders
- Notable aliases: Famine
- Abilities: Flight; Plasma blasts; Ability to view infrared; Radiation immunity; As Horseman of Famine: Ability to emit hunger-inducing light

Sunfire (Shiro Yoshida (吉田 四郎, Yoshida Shirō)) is a superhero appearing in American comic books published by Marvel Comics. Created by Roy Thomas and Don Heck, the character is portrayed as a mutant and sometimes as a member of the X-Men.

A Japanese mutant who can generate superheated plasma and fly, Sunfire was briefly a member of the second X-Men team but quit after their first mission as he was not suited for teamwork due to his temperament and arrogance. Since then he has kept his distance from the team, but at times has returned to aid them as an occasional ally.

== Concept and creation ==
Roy Thomas recalled that, during his first run on X-Men,

I wanted to add a young Japanese or Japanese-American whose mother had been at Hiroshima or Nagasaki as a corresponding character to the X-Men, whose parents were, at that time, assumed to have been at the Manhattan Project. Stan [Lee, X-Men editor/co-creator] didn't give me any good reason [for rejecting the character]—he just didn't want to, I think... I didn't bring it up again, but when I came back to the book, with Neal Adams, I created Sunfire, who is pretty much the character I had wanted to do some years earlier. I didn't make him an X-Man right away. By that time, Stan gave me a little more free reign [sic]. In fact, he was included in Giant Size X-Men #1, along with Banshee, precisely because I had gone around creating some 'international mutants,' with the goal of expanding the team at some time. I thought the X-Men shouldn't all be white Americans.

Thomas later commented on the character's costume "I had Don Heck design the character from my verbal suggestion of a costume that was an embodiment of the imperial Japanese Rising Sun flag, as Japanese or Japanese-American.

In a future interview Thomas noted the unique mask of the character "Don Heck gave him that mask — kind of a weird dragony kind of mask — it wasn't just a standard mask." Sunfire was the first East Asian superhero in Marvel Comics.

== Publication history ==
Created by writer Roy Thomas and artist Don Heck, Sunfire first appeared in X-Men #64 (January 1970). As of 2025, Sunfire has appeared in 87 comic book issues.

Sunfire also appeared in the Iron Man comics issues #67–70 & 98 (1974–1977) and the Wolverine issues #55–60 (June–September of 1992).

In 1998, Marvel published the miniseries Sunfire and Big Hero Six, presenting Sunfire's brief membership in a new superhero team sanctioned by the Japanese government.

Maximum Security issues #1 & 3 featured Sunfire.

Sunfire became part of the Exiles in issue #7 (December 5, 2001), manifesting as the woman version of the character from an alternate reality.

Writer Rick Remender included Sunfire as a member of the Uncanny Avengers, starting with issue #5 (March 27, 2013).

He joined X-Men Unlimited Infinity in issue #106 (September 25, 2023) and had a major supporting role in the 2025 limited series Doom's Division, a tie-in to the storyline One World Under Doom.

In June 2026, it was announced that Sunfire would appear in the miniseries Queen in Black: Defenders of Light and Dark, a tie-in to the "Queen in Black" crossover event. Writer Tom Waltz included Sunfire as he was a longtime fan of the character and felt that his nuclear powers made him a good fit for the Defenders.

== Fictional character biography ==
Shiro Yoshida was born in Agarashima, Japan. His mother suffered radiation poisoning due to exposure to the atomic bomb dropped on Hiroshima; as a result, Shiro was born as a mutant possessing solar radiation powers.

Shiro's mother died of radiation poisoning when he was young. Shiro grew to hate the United States, despite the influence of his father, an ambassador to the United Nations who was more tolerant of the US. Shiro's greedy uncle Tomo inspired him to become "Sunfire" and engage in a one-man battle against the U.S. As Sunfire, he attacked the United States Capitol and battled the X-Men, after which he witnessed Tomo murder his father; distraught, he killed Tomo and surrendered to the authorities.

Sunfire battled Namor the Sub-Mariner but then fought alongside him against the Dragon Lord. Sunfire also fought Iron Man but was abducted by the Mandarin and used to power one of the Mandarin's machines. Once freed, he and Iron Man fought Ultimo.

Professor X recruited Sunfire to a new team of X-Men to rescue the originals from the living island Krakoa. However, after the mission, he rejected X-Men membership.

Sunfire becomes involved with the X-Men once again when Apocalypse kidnaps him, as Sunfire is one of the Twelve, a group of mutants Apocalypse required to obtain reality-warping powers. Sunfire then became a member of the Mumbai branch of X-Corporation, a non-government organization devoted to the protection of mutant rights.

During the early story arcs of the latest edition of Marvel Team-Up, Sunfire attempts to combat the powerful villain known as Titannus, a reject of the Super-Skrull program who had made his way to Earth after being brainwashed by an alien race to serve as their ultimate weapon. Attempting to contain Titannus, Sunfire summons the Japanese army to confront him, but the powerful foe defeats them army with ease, and is only barely beaten by a new team hastily assembled by Doctor Strange to combat this threat.

Sunfire is critically injured in his battle with Lady Deathstrike. Art by Karl Moline.

Later, it was revealed that Sunfire had worked with Rogue and Mystique back when Sunfire was still working with Tomo and Rogue was a member of the Brotherhood of Mutants. Also working with them was a girl called Blindspot, who had the power to erase and restore memories. The four were on a mission to steal the process to bond adamantium from Lord Dark Wind, the father of Lady Deathstrike.

Since Blindspot always erased her tracks once a contract ended, she wipes the minds of everyone involved so no one would remember her. Blindspot discovers Lord Dark Wind wanted all four dead for trying to steal his adamantium process. Realizing that the others would be in danger while having no memory of their mission, Blindspot went back to Japan to erase Lord Dark Wind's memory. When she got there, she discovered that his daughter (who later became Deathstrike) had already killed him. Blindspot erased Deathstrike's memories but, as Deathstrike was more machine than woman, Deathstrike was able to restore her own memories from an electronic backup. Deathstrike kidnapped Blindspot, who released a group photo of Sunfire, Rogue, and Mystique to attract their attention to save her. Rogue joined Sunfire, whose reputation had been ruined by the photograph, in Tokyo to discover why they were framed and who was responsible. The two ran into Lady Deathstrike who, in a heated battle, cut off Sunfire's legs, leaving him in critical condition. Rogue surrendered to Deathstrike, who imprisoned the two. While imprisoned, Rogue met Blindspot, who restored Rogue's memories and explained what was going on.

A weakened Sunfire, with Rogue and Blindspot. Art by Derec Donovan.

When Deathstrike discovers that the three were not responsible for stealing the adamantium, she attempted kill them to destroy any evidence of what she had done. A weak Sunfire asks Rogue to absorb his powers so she could properly battle Deathstrike. Rogue had previously lost the powers of Carol Danvers that she had taken and was hesitant. She worries that she could harm Sunfire, but Blindspot pushes her on Sunfire's face, causing her to absorb all his powers and possibly killing him. With it, Rogue now also contains Sunfire's personality, similar to how she also once had Danvers' personality within her. With Sunfire's personality controlling her, Rogue seeks revenge on Deathstrike and severely injures the woman. The X-Men arrive in time to intervene, but Blindspot erases Rogue's memories of being an X-Man causing her to see her teammates as her enemies. After a brief altercation, Rogue's memories are restored and she tells the X-Men what had happened to Sunfire. They discover that his body is missing, leading some of the X-Men to believe he is still alive.

Sunfire as Famine, one of Apocalypse's Horsemen. Art by Salvador Larroca.

Sunfire loses his powers before M-Day and his X-gene during that moment. It is revealed that Sunfire is rescued by a mysterious ninja group and taken to a hospital in Aspen. After being revived from his coma, the world's leading specialist in prosthetic limbs, Masanori Kuzuya, offers him his services. Before the reasoning behind the rescue is revealed, Apocalypse appears and offers Sunfire the chance for vengeance, as well as the recovery of his lost limbs and power, in return for his service as Famine, one of Apocalypse's Horsemen. However, Famine is defeated by Rogue and returned to his normal form. Sunfire joins the other X-Men in their battle against Apocalypse. After Apocalypse escapes, Gambit helps his fellow Horseman Gambit overcome his brainwashing and the two are recruited by Mister Sinister into his Marauders.

In "Messiah Complex", Sunfire and the Marauders clash with the X-Men and other groups for the first mutant child born after the events of M-Day. In the final battle on Muir Island, Sunfire is knocked out while the remaining Marauders flee or are killed.

Feeling disgraced and humiliated, Sunfire retires his mantle and wanders around Tokyo in a drunken stupor until Wolverine approaches him to join the Avengers Unity Squad for a chance of redemption. Sunfire joins the Avengers against the Apocalypse Twins and sides with Wolverine, Rogue and Thor after the Twins cause a division within the team. The team is able to put aside their differences to fight the Twins and Kang the Conqueror. In the final fight against Kang, Sunfire's body is destroyed but due being in prior contact with a Celestial, he is reborn in a state of pure energy and uses his new powers to destroy the Twins' armada and defeat Kang.

Sunfire and the Avengers are affected by the inversion spell cast in "AXIS", which reverses their morality into becoming villains, with Sunfire joining the affected X-Men into declaring mutant supremacy. Sunfire and the other affected heroes are eventually cured of the inversion spell. Afterwards, Sunfire left the Avengers to join X-Factor.

During the events of Inhumans vs. X-Men, Sunfire initially joins Cyclops' faction of X-Men against the Inhumans. When Sunfire destroys of one of the Terrigen Clouds, the Inhumans publicly execute Cyclops in retaliation. Sunfire later defends Asian mutant refugees with the help of Storm's faction of X-Men and joins in the final assault against New Attilan.

Sunfire eventually regains his reputation and standing as Japan's prime hero and is invited by Black Panther to attend an international summit at Avengers Mountain. He is also recruited by Jean Grey to help oppose the crazed Nate Grey from remaking the world in his image.

In the Krakoan Age, Sunfire is one of the many mutants who relocates to the mutant nation of Krakoa. During the events of "King in Black", Krakoa is targeted by Knull, but Sunfire is instrumental in defending the island from the symbiotes due to their weakness to fire. Sunfire's powers are further amplified by Fabian Cortez, turning him into the "Krakoan Sun". Sunfire is killed by a symbiote-infected Cable, but is later resurrected by Krakoa's resurrection protocols. At the Hellfire Gala, Sunfire is elected to the X-Men due to his heroics.

Sunfire eventually develops an interest in Arakko and begins spending time in the new mutant world. Arakko itself reaches out to Sunfire and requests that he rescue its Voice, Redroot, from Orchis. Sunfire travels to Otherworld and battles Redroot's captors, but Moira X stabs him in the heart with Redroot herself. Sunfire escapes with Redroot embedded in his chest. Following a war on Arakko, Redroot is separated from Sunfire and fully restored, able to serve as Arakko's Voice once more.

During the "One World Under Doom" storyline, Sunfire leads a resistance group based out of Asia against Emperor Doom, who orders the South Korean government to send the Tiger Division, renamed as Doom's Division, after him. Sunfire and his forces lure Doom's Division into an ambush off the coast of Hokkaido, revealing that Wave and Karma have been working for him as double agents. Sunfire convinces Taegukgi into forming a truce with him against Doom, but White Fox appears, kills Sunfire by absorbing his soul with a kiss, and has Doom's Division arrested for treason. In reality, Sunfire faked his death with White Fox, who was secretly supporting his resistance. Sunfire joins the renamed Tiger Division to help take down Doom while White Fox covers up their escape.

During the "Queen in Black" crossover event, Sunfire is recruited into the Defenders to combat Hela.

== Powers and abilities ==
Sunfire is a mutant with the ability to absorb solar radiation, and convert it to ionize matter into a fiery plasma state which bursts into flame when exposed to oxygen. Referring to his plasma output as "solar fire", he can release this energy through his hands as blasts of searing heat, deadly radiation, explosive concussive force, or simple flames. By ionizing the air around him, he can surround himself with an aura of heat intense enough to melt steel, or fly by focusing his aura downwards in a tight stream of ionized gas to propel him through the air like a rocket. Sunfire can see heat, by shifting his vision from visible light to infrared. Sunfire has the ability to form a psionic force field while using his plasma as protection from heat and radiation, both that of his own generation and that from outside sources. In a similar fashion to the Human Torch's nova burst, Sunfire is capable of increasing his plasma output to temperatures around 1,000,000 degrees Fahrenheit, and emitting it as an omnidirectional blast.

Sunfire transferred his powers to Rogue to defeat Lady Deathstrike who had just cut off his legs. This (like Ms. Marvel before him) left him still a mutant but powerless. After his transformation into Famine, a Horseman of Apocalypse, his powers and legs were returned, and he could now also use them to create flashes of light that affected the sections of the human brain which control hunger, causing any people who saw his light flashes to feel as if they were starving. Due to further genetic enhancement from Apocalypse, Sunfire is also able to secrete a specialized bio-oxygen from his skin, which allows him to breathe and conjure his flames even in the vacuum of space.

Shiro is also an accomplished martial artist. He has displayed impressive hand-to-hand combat skills on several occasions. Shiro stated that he did not need to deploy his powers to defeat Hand ninjas. Trained in karate, judo, and kendo, he is highly proficient in deploying his superhuman abilities in combat.

== Reception ==
- In 2014, Entertainment Weekly ranked Sunfire 41st in their "Let's rank every X-Man ever" list.
- In 2020, CBR.com ranked Sunfire 2nd in their "Marvel Comics: Ranking Every Member Of Big Hero 6 From Weakest To Most Powerful" list.

== Other versions ==
=== Age of Apocalypse ===
An alternate universe version of Shiro Yoshida / Sunfire appears in Age of Apocalypse. This version is among the few survivors of Holocaust's devastation of Japan. He was subjected to experimentation by Maximus, who pushed his powers to their limits and caused his body to be permanently ignited. Yoshida is rescued by the X-Men and joins them, utilizing a containment suit to contain his fire.

After the regular reality's X-Force crosses over into the Age of Apocalypse, Sunfire is one of the few X-Men to return to prevent the destruction of Earth-616 by Archangel. During a battle with Iceman, Sunfire is killed while attempting to siphon energy from Holocaust's weapon of mass destruction.

=== Age of X-Man ===
An alternate universe version of Shiro Yoshida appears in Age of X-Man. This version is a civil management instructor at the Summers Institute of Higher Learning.

=== House of M ===
An alternate universe version of Shiro Yoshida / Sunfire appears in House of M. This version is the emperor of Japan and a leading member of Project: Genesis, a project sanctioned by the Japanese branch of S.H.I.E.L.D. with the goal of forcefully mutating baseline humans.

=== Marvel Zombies ===
A zombified alternate universe version of Sunfire appears in Marvel Zombies.

=== Ultimate Marvel ===
An alternate universe version of Shiro Yoshida / Sunfire appears in the Ultimate Marvel imprint. This version is a member of Alpha Flight.

=== Ultimate Universe ===
An alternate universe version of Sunfire from Earth-6160 appears in the Ultimate Universe imprint. This version is the "Sun Emperor" of the Harada-Yoshida Alliance, a consolidated union of three clans that rule over the power bloc Hi no Kuni.

== In other media ==
Sunfire as he appears in X-Men Legends II: Rise of Apocalypse

=== Television ===
- Sunfire appears in a self-titled episode of Spider-Man and His Amazing Friends, voiced by Jerry Dexter.
- Sunfire appears in X-Men: The Animated Series, voiced by Denis Akiyama.
- Sunfire appears in Marvel Disk Wars: The Avengers, voiced by Tomokazu Sugita in the Japanese version and Yuri Lowenthal in the English dub.

=== Video games ===
- Sunfire appears as a playable character in X-Men Legends II: Rise of Apocalypse, voiced by James Sie.
- Sunfire appears in X-Men: Destiny, voiced by Gaku Space. This version is the father of game-original character Aimi Yoshida.
- Sunfire appears as an unlockable character in Marvel: Avengers Alliance.
- Sunfire appears in Marvel's Wolverine, voiced by Jonathan Tanigaki. This version is a former member of Team X.

== Influence ==
In an interview with Wizard, Alex Ross stated that Sunfire's mask served as the inspiration for Kyle Rayner / Green Lantern's original costume mask, which debuted in Green Lantern #51 (in 1994).

== See also ==
- Sunfire (Exiles)
