= Absolute Carnage =

Comic book crossover storyline

- Cover of Absolute Carnage #1
- Publisher: Marvel Comics
- Publication date: August – November 2019
- Genre: Superhero
- Main characters: Venom; Eddie Brock; Carnage; Cletus Kasady

Creative team
- Writer: Donny Cates
- Penciller: Ryan Stegman

"Absolute Carnage" is a 2019 comic book crossover storyline published by Marvel Comics, by Donny Cates and Ryan Stegman.

== Editorial history ==
The comic book event was first announced in March at the 2019 Chicago Comic & Entertainment Expo, followed by an online press conference. Donny Cates said that Carnage would be the main villain, and that the story involves all Marvel characters who have used a symbiote at some point and reference older stories involving Venom. He said that "Cletus Kasady is back, and he is deadlier than he's ever been. Absolute Carnage encompasses every single character who has ever worn a symbiote and every symbiote that has ever been, going all the way back to when Peter found the black suit. Going from there to Maximum Carnage to Venomized to everything... everyone is a target". It was followed by several comics with variant cover arts with their characters reimagined with the Carnage symbiote.

The tie-ins were announced in May. They feature Spider-Man, Venom, Deadpool, Miles Morales, Iron Fist and Scream, among others.

== Plot ==
=== Issue 1 ===
==== Chapter 1: The Bleeding King ====
While walking to Times Square, Eddie Brock explains to his son Dylan Brock about how the Symbiotes were created by Knull as well as the Church of the New Darkness having resurrected Cletus Kasady. Upon arrival, Eddie notices that there are wanted posters for Venom for the deaths of Lee Price and several inmates at Ryker's Island. When they flee into the subway upon being trailed by a man in a trenchcoat, they encounter Kasady, who shoves them onto the subway tracks. They are saved by the man in the trenchcoat who is actually the Venom symbiote in disguise. The Venom symbiote re-bonds to Eddie, stating that it has fully recovered from the dark magic that it absorbed. A pair of police officers arrive and hold Venom at gunpoint. When the train explodes, Venom shields Dylan as Dark Carnage appears. Venom tells the police officers to get Dylan as far away from here as possible while he confronts Dark Carnage. Eddie notices that Kasady's body is bonded to the Grendel symbiote. As Dark Carnage tries to rip Venom off of Eddie, he claims that Knull is coming to destroy everything. Eddie uses the electrical rails of the subway to disable Dark Carnage. While recuperating at an apartment, Eddie and Dylan are visited by Robbie Robertson. He notices Eddie's condition and calls Peter Parker.

==== Chapter 2: The God Son ====
Sometime later at The Coffee Bean & Tea Leaf, Spider-Man meets with Eddie and Dylan where he hears about Cletus Kasady being bonded to the Carnage symbiote, the approach of Knull. Their discussion is interrupted by a news report about the bodies of Angelo Fortunato, Carl Mach, Leslie Gesneria, and Thaddeus Ross being discovered in a pit. After thwarting a robbery, Spider-Man states to Eddie that he would ask Mister Fantastic for a solution that involves extracting the codices without killing people, but the timeline is unfeasible causing Eddie to take Spider-Man to meet with Maker. At the house of "Rex Strickland", Spider-Man and Venom meet Maker who is working on the S.C.I.T.H.E. (Symbiote Codex Isolation and Thermo-Heated Extraction). After Spider-Man refuses to let S.C.I.T.H.E. be tested on Dylan, Maker states that he wants to test it on Norman Osborn.

==== Chapter 3: The Long Red Dark ====
Spider-Man and Venom head to Ravencroft and confront Osborn. Meanwhile, John Jameson meets with Spider-Man as he states that Venom is his ally. When they meet up with Venom near Osborn's cell, Spider-Man and Venom notice John in pain as it is revealed that Dark Carnage has bonded to him. As John fully turns into Dark Carnage, he informs Spider-Man that Knull is coming. Elsewhere in Ravencroft, Cletus Kasady is walking through the halls as he exposes his ribs to unleash the maggots for them to have the inmates be bonded with Grendel. The inmates are transformed by the symbiotes into creatures resembling Doppelganger. Osborn is freed from his cell as he attacks Spider-Man and Venom. Using an offshoot of the Grendel symbiote, Dark Carnage bonds it with Osborn to recreate his Carnage form.

=== Issue 2 ===
Dark Carnage gloats that Knull will bring darkness and death to the universe. As Venom forms a wrecking ball to make a hole in the wall, Spider-Man wants to save Norman Osborn. Venom grabs Spider-Man as he carries him up the tower, creates dragon-like wings, and flies him away from Ravencroft. Dark Carnage tells Osborn's Carnage form that there is nowhere that Spider-Man and Venom could escape to. Maker contacts Eddie and tells him that Dylan is fine. Maker informs Eddie about the grave that the Church of the New Darkness has made with the dead bodies. In addition, he also states that Anne Weying's body was never exhumed as he advises Venom to kill Dark Carnage before the situation gets worse. In SoHo, Manhattan, Miles Morales and Scorpion are fighting the Carnage Doppelgangers seeking to claim that Venom and Mania codex inside Scorpion. However, Miles is infected with a Grendel symbiote, leaving Venom horrified.

=== Issue 3 ===
Miles has been transformed into a six-armed Carnage Doppelganger. Lamenting that he could not rescue Miles, Venom fights him as Scorpion calls for help. As the Grendel symbiote heals Osborn, Venom brings Scorpion to the house of "Rex Strickland" since Scorpion would be in danger if he was sent back to prison. Venom finds that Spider-Man has called in Captain America, Thing, Wolverine, and Bruce Banner. As Captain America is handed Scorpion, Dylan comes in, having befriended the Sleeper symbiote. As Eddie is placed in a pod part of the S.C.I.T.H.E., the real Eddie Brock comes in and states his knowledge of Spider-Man being Peter Parker. It is then discovered that Eddie is Dark Carnage in disguise. Dark Carnage cracks through Captain America's pod as the Carnage Doppelgangers break into the building. The Venom symbiote leaves Eddie and engulfs Banner, transforming into a Hulk-like form.

=== Issue 4 ===
While the Venomized Hulk fights Dark Carnage, Eddie Brock leads Spider-Man, Dylan Brock, and Normie Osborn to the door while assuring to Dylan that Sleeper can handle himself. Eddie asks Spider-Man to watch over Dylan while he gets the weapons that the Jury used on the Symbiotes. Eddie even equips himself with a Guardsman gauntlet and Captain America's shield. Eddie is then ambushed by the Carnage-possessed Miles Morales. Dark Carnage senses the power of the One Below All in Hulk and begins planning to access its power. When Dark Carnage tries to get Hulk to side with him, Hulk punches Dark Carnage, who sends tendrils into his head to mess with his mind. Using the cannon in the Guardsman gauntlet and charging Captain America's shield with it, Eddie Brock electrocutes the Symbiote and frees Miles from its control. Afterward, Miles tells Eddie that he needs to get to the Venom symbiote before Dark Carnage absorbs it and frees Knull. Dark Carnage rips Venom off of Hulk and assimilates it. Captain America assures Eddie that he did all he can while punching a Carnage doppelganger. As Captain America takes back his shield, Thing and Wolverine arrive as the three of them charge towards Dark Carnage. Miles tells Eddie that the Carnage doppelgangers are attacking the S.C.I.T.H.E. and that Maker lied about destroying the Symbiote Codices. As Dark Carnage wipes the floor with Captain America, Thing, and Wolverine while Spider-Man fights Norman Osborn, Eddie fights past the Carnage Doppelgangers to get to the S.C.I.T.H.E. Venom goes after Absolute Carnage and declares himself as the avenging fury of New York.

=== Issue 5 ===
The issue begins with a flashback of Eddie Brock first meeting Cletus Kasady in prison. In the present, while Eddie fights Dark Carnage, Cloak, Dagger, Iron Fist, Firestar, Morbius, Deathlok, Captain Marvel, Deadpool, and Scream arrive to help in the battle. Meanwhile, Spider-Man collapses during the fight with Norman, leading Dylan to somehow detonate him. Dark Carnage attacks Dylan, holding him hostage and reminding Eddie of his choice: to let his son die and let Dark Carnage awaken Knull or to kill Dark Carnage and take all of his codices, awakening Knull himself. Choosing to save his son, Eddie creates a Necrosword out of his combined symbiotes to kill Carnage, freeing Knull in the process. As Spider-Man leaves to check on the others, Eddie is confronted by Dylan about them being father and son.

== Titles involved ==
=== Prelude ===
- Free Comic Book Day - FCBD 2019: Spider-Man/Venom #1
- Web of Venom: Carnage Born #1
- Web of Venom: Cult of Carnage #1
- Web of Venom: Funeral Pyre #1

=== Main series ===
- Absolute Carnage #1–5

=== Tie-in series ===
- Absolute Carnage vs. Deadpool #1–3
- Absolute Carnage: Lethal Protectors #1–3
- Absolute Carnage: Miles Morales #1–3
- Absolute Carnage: Scream #1–3
- Amazing Spider-Man (2018) #30–31
- Venom (2018) #17–20

=== One-shots ===
- Absolute Carnage: Avengers #1
- Absolute Carnage: Captain Marvel #1
- Absolute Carnage: Immortal Hulk #1
- Absolute Carnage: Separation Anxiety #1
- Absolute Carnage: Symbiote of Vengeance #1
- Absolute Carnage: Symbiote Spider-Man #1
- Absolute Carnage: Weapon Plus #1

=== Aftermath ===
- Ruins of Ravencroft: Carnage #1
- Ruins of Ravencroft: Dracula #1
- Ruins of Ravencroft: Sabretooth #1
- Ravencroft #1–5
- Scream: Curse of Carnage #1–5
- Venom (2018) #21–25

== Critical reception ==
The main storyline received overwhelmingly positive reviews, but the ending was criticized for its rushed pacing. According to Comic Book Roundup, the entire series had an average rating of 8.7 out of 10 based on 67 reviews.

== Sequel ==
The events of Absolute Carnage culminate in an event series involving the coming of the Symbiote God Knull to Earth. This sequel series is called "King in Black" and began in December 2020.

== Collected editions ==
| Title | Material Collected | Format | Publication Date | ISBN |
|---|---|---|---|---|
| Absolute Carnage | Absolute Carnage #1-5, material from Free Comic Book Day 2019 (Spider-Man/Venom) #1 | Paperback | 30 January 2020 | 1302919083 |
| Absolute Carnage: Scream | Absolute Carnage: Scream #1-3, Absolute Carnage: Separation Anxiety #1 | Paperback | 28 January 2020 | 1302920154 |
| Absolute Carnage: Miles Morales | Absolute Carnage: Miles Morales #1-3, Absolute Carnage: Weapon Plus #1 | Paperback | 28 January 2020 | 1302920146 |
| Absolute Carnage: Immortal Hulk and Other Tales | Absolute Carnage: Immortal Hulk #1, Absolute Carnage: Symbiote Spider-Man #1, Absolute Carnage: Symbiote of Vengeance #1, stinger pages from Symbiote Spider-Man #3 and Immortal Hulk #20 | Paperback | 28 January 2020 | 1302924486 |
| Absolute Carnage vs. Deadpool | Absolute Carnage vs. Deadpool #1-3, Absolute Carnage: Captain Marvel #1 | Paperback | 2 March 2020 | 1846533651 |
| Absolute Carnage: Lethal Protectors | Absolute Carnage: Lethal Protectors #1-3, Absolute Carnage: Avengers #1 | Paperback | 28 January 2020 | 1302920138 |
| Amazing Spider-Man by Nick Spencer Vol. 6: Absolute Carnage | Amazing Spider-Man (vol. 5) #30-31 | Paperback | 30 January 2020 | 1302917277 |
| Venom Vol. 3: Absolute Carnage | Venom (vol. 4) #17-20 | Paperback | 30 April 2020 | 1846533805 |
| Absolute Carnage Omnibus | Absolute Carnage #1-5, Absolute Carnage vs. Deadpool #1-3, Absolute Carnage: Captain Marvel #1, Absolute Carnage: Immortal Hulk #1, Absolute Carnage: Symbiote Spider-Man #1, Absolute Carnage: Symbiote Of Vengeance #1, Absolute Carnage: Lethal Protectors #1-3, Absolute Carnage: Avengers #1, Absolute Carnage: Miles Morales #1-3, Absolute Carnage: Weapon Plus #1, Absolute Carnage: Scream #1-3, Absolute Carnage: Separation Anxiety #1, Amazing Spider-Man (vol. 5) #29-31, Venom (vol. 4) #16-20, Absolute Carnage stinger pages | Hardcover | 8 September 2020 | 1302925296 |
| Venomnibus by Cates & Stegman | Absolute Carnage #1-5, Venom (vol. 4) #1-35 and Venom Annual #1, Web of Venom: Ve'Nam #1, Web of Venom: Carnage Born #1, Web of Venom: Wraith #1, King in Black #1-5, material from Free Comic Book Day 2019 (Spider-Man/Venom), Free Comic Book Day 2020 (Spider-Man/Venom), Incoming #1, Carnage: Black, White & Blood #2 | Hardcover | 26 July 2022 | 978-1302946418 |

== See also ==
- Maximum Carnage
- Venom: Lethal Protector
- Venomverse
- Venom vs. Carnage
