= Star (Ripley Ryan) =

Superhero appearing in Marvel Comics publications

Ripley Ryan Star
- Textless variant cover of Star #1 (January 2020). Art by Jeehyung Lee.

Publication information
- Publisher: Marvel Comics
- First appearance: Captain Marvel #1 (January 2019)
- Created by: Kelly Thompson; Carmen Carnero

In-story information
- Alter ego: Ripley Ryan
- Species: Human mutate / Kree hybrid
- Team affiliations: Infinity Watch; Thunderbolts
- Partnerships: Scarlet Witch
- Notable aliases: Star
- Abilities: Superhuman strength, speed, durability, and senses; Energy construct generation; Reality manipulation; Energy projection; Teleportation; Optic blasts; Flight

Ripley Ryan is a character appearing in American comic books published by Marvel Comics. Created by Kelly Thompson and Carmen Carnero, the character first appeared in Captain Marvel #1 (January 2019). Ripley Ryan was originally an adversary of the superhero Carol Danvers / Captain Marvel. She was portrayed as a supervillain who adopted the mantle of Star. She subsequently evolved into an antihero while retaining the same codename.

Star is depicted as one of the key figures who bonded with an Infinity Stone, playing a role in the narrative that examines the challenges faced by the stone-bearers and Thanos’s quest to acquire the stones. She joined the Infinity Watch team, which is responsible for safeguarding the Infinity Stones and preventing them from falling into the wrong hands.

== Development ==
=== Concept and creation ===
Sarah Brunstad, Editor at Marvel Comics, revealed that the concept of unveiling Ripley Ryan as Star had been in development even before the first Captain Marvel script was finalized. The Captain Marvel team has thoroughly enjoyed crafting her character and eagerly anticipated her pivotal moment. Brunstad expressed her enthusiasm for Carmen Carnero's continued involvement in illustrating the miniseries covers. She highlighted Kelly Thompson's compelling dialogue in issue #11, which delves into the underlying motivations behind Ripley Ryan's conflict with Carol Danvers. According to Brunstad, Ryan is a highly relatable character whose trauma from the first arc's Nuclear Man has profoundly influenced her, driving her actions through fear and a determination to never again be a victim.

=== Publication history ===
Ripley Ryan debuted in Captain Marvel vol. 10 #1 (January 2019), created by Kelly Thompson and Carmen Carnero. She later appeared in the 2020 Star series, her first solo comic book series, by Kelly Thompson. She appeared in the 2021 Black Cat series, the 2021 King in Black: Thunderbolts series, and the 2021 Amazing Spider-Man Annual series. Ryan was later included in the Infinity Watch storyline, featuring in the 2024 Thanos Annual one-shot, and the 2024 Infinity Watch series.

== Fictional character biography ==
Ripley Ryan grew up in a home where she was abused by her mother. She was also bullied a lot growing up.

She became a reporter for Ms. magazine years later. She encountered Carol Danvers when they were attacked by Nuclear Man. He kidnapped Ryan and took her to Roosevelt Island. Danvers pursued them with help from Echo, Hazmat, and Spider-Woman. Ryan helped Danvers and her allies defeat Nuclear Man.

Ripley Ryan later found out about Doctor Minerva's efforts to engineer humans so that they would become a hybrid of humans and Kree. She volunteered to partake in these experiments. The experiment was a success, and Ryan became a Kree hybrid. However, she gained no superpowers from the experiment. With help from Minerva, she utilized the stolen powers from Captain Marvel at the time when she had unleashed a "Kraken" into New York City. When Captain Marvel defeated the "Kraken," she got infected, with her powers being siphoned into Ryan. She became known as the superhero Star who helped to fight an armada of "Kraken." Her popularity rose while Captain Marvel's plummeted.

Captain Marvel brought Doctor Minerva to Stark Unlimited HQ to get her some medical treatment following the attack. After learning some information from Minerva, Captain Marvel went to confront Star in Times Square. She got weaker owing to the Power Siphoners as she fought Star. Captain Marvel ripped the device off her chest, which severed the connection, and caused both of them to fall to the ground. Star revealed to Captain Marvel that she released the virus into New York City so that she can draw on the powers of all the New Yorkers. Captain Marvel defeated Star by ripping the Power Siphoner off of Star's chest. While it seemed that she was remanded to the Raft, it turned out that Star had somehow merged with the Reality Gem and escaped.

Ripley Ryan later visited the Bar with No Name and got into a fight with Titania. However, she was defeated owing to her inexperience with the Reality Gem, and was thrown out. Star was later knocked out by Loki. While in a warehouse, Loki attempted to remove the Reality Gem from Star to no avail, as he states that other people have come for the Infinity Gems. When she asks him who would come for them, Loki listed a lot of names. She thanked Loki for the information and attempted to destroy him.

Star later tries to enlist Jessica Jones to help her, only to be turned down due to recalling what she did to Captain Marvel. Both of them fought, until Scarlet Witch broke up the fight and stated to Star that she is destroying reality.

During the "King in Black" storyline, Mayor Wilson Fisk forms a new incarnation of the Thunderbolts to escort Star, the current keeper of one of the Infinity Gems, into battle to kill Knull. To proceed, they will first need to make contact with a man Kingpin believes can help turn the tide against Knull. Star and the Thunderbolts make their way to Ravencroft, where the man that would help in defeating Knull turns out to be Norman Osborn.

== Powers and abilities ==
Ripley Ryan gained a variety of superpowers following her merger with the Reality Gem. This fusion granted her the ability to manipulate reality itself. She exhibits enhanced attributes, such as superhuman strength, speed, durability, and heightened senses. Ryan can project energy beams, teleport to different locations, and create solid energy constructs. Furthermore, she possesses the power of flight.

== Reception ==
=== Critical response ===
Tessa Smith from Screen Rant described Ripley Ryan as one of Marvel's most compelling new heroines. Rich Johnston of Bleeding Cool referred to her as a prominent new star in the comic book world. Previews World highlighted Ripley Ryan as a standout character and an exciting new addition to Marvel's prestigious lineup of superheroes. Megan Nicole O'Brien of Comic Book Resources placed Ripley Ryan 6th on their list of characters who should appear in the sequel to Captain Marvel.

=== Impact ===
In 2019, Marvel Comics Editor Sarah Brunstad asserted, "The whole Captain Marvel team loved the character from the beginning, but the fan and retailer response to her has been overwhelming." Matthew Aguilar of ComicBook.com observed that the character gained popularity very quickly. The debut of Ripley Ryan as Star in Captain Marvel #8 was attributed as a major factor in the comic book's sell-out status. Some readers purchased multiple copies and resold them at significantly higher prices on eBay. The third print variant of Captain Marvel #8, featuring Star, had a Fair Market Value (FMV) of $150 for a 9.8 graded copy, surpassing the value of the first print issues. Jude Terror of Bleeding Cool later referred to Ripley Ryan as "one of eBay's favorite new characters."

== Literary reception ==
=== Volumes ===
==== Star (2020) ====
===== Issue 1 =====
According to Diamond Comic Distributors, Star #1 was the 10th best selling comic book in January 2020.

Samantha Puc of ComicsBeat remarked that Star #1 is an effective entry point for readers, introducing a new Marvel villain with morally ambiguous motives and establishing her role in the broader Marvel Universe. Puc considers the debut issue a "BUY." Hussein Wasiti stated that he had no prior opinion on Star before reading this issue but now looks forward to the rest of the miniseries. Despite some concerns with the artwork, Wasiti enjoyed the issue and also rated it a "BUY." Jenna Anderson of ComicBook.com gave Star #1 a grade of 5 out of 5, noting that after Ripley Ryan's significant and contentious impact on Captain Marvel, she now receives her own solo miniseries. Anderson praised the issue for its exploration of Ryan's powers and the inclusion of numerous engaging cameos. While readers may not agree with every decision made by Ripley, Anderson found her journey and expanding role in the Marvel Universe to be both intricate and captivating.

===== Issue 2 =====
According to Diamond Comic Distributors, Star #2 was the 39th best selling comic book in February 2020.

M.J. Kaufmann of GeekMom gave Star #2 a grade of 4 out of 5, stating that the series has earned a spot on her pull list due to her admiration for Thompson’s previous work on characters like Jessica Jones, Captain Marvel, and Mr. & Mrs. X. The series continues to hold her interest thanks to its strong plot, engaging character development, and well-executed artwork. Kaufmann expressed anticipation for the next issue. Jenna Anderson of ComicBook.com gave Star #2 a grade of 4 out of 5, commenting that Ripley's first solo adventure progresses further into a complex and engaging narrative. The issue offers cameos, additional backstory, and features appealing artwork by Javier Pina and Filipe Andrade. Anderson noted that even if readers are not yet invested in Star’s story, this issue provides enough quality content to warrant a look.

== Collected editions ==
Title	Material collected	Published date	ISBN
Star: Birth Of A Dragon	Star #1-5	November 4, 2020	978-1302924584
