= King in Black =

2020 Marvel Comics event

- Cover to King in Black #1.
- Publisher: Marvel Comics
- Publication date: December 2020 – April 2021
- Genre: Superhero
- Main characters: Eddie Brock; Venom; Knull; Spider-Man; Avengers; Fantastic Four; Thunderbolts; X-Men

Creative team
- Writer: Donny Cates
- Penciller: Ryan Stegman
- Inker: JP Mayer
- Letterer: Clayton Cowles
- Colorist: Frank Martin
- Editors: Devin Lewis; Danny Khazem; Nick Lowe

"King in Black" is a comic book event written by Donny Cates with art by Ryan Stegman, and was published from 2020 to 2021 by Marvel Comics. It is a continuation to 2019's "Absolute Carnage", also containing fallout from 2020's "Empyre". In the story, Knull and his symbiotes invade Earth, leaving Eddie Brock / Venom, the Avengers, the X-Men, and numerous other superheroes to protect it.

In 2023, elements from "King in Black" were adapted to the video game Marvel's Spider-Man 2. In 2024, elements from "King in Black" were adapted to the live-action feature film Venom: The Last Dance, with Knull voiced by Andy Serkis. From July to September 2025, "King in Black" was loosely adapted to the video game Marvel Rivals as the season "The Abyss Awakens", with Knull voiced by Michael Scott; consequently, "The Abyss Awakens" formed the basis for a comic-book sequel to "King in Black", entitled "Queen in Black", in 2026.

== Plot ==
=== Prelude ===
Zoralis Gupa of the planet Silnius takes an urgent call while mentioning to the person on the other side to warn all neighboring systems. He tells Victoria that various planets are being devastated, rendering the galactic economy fragile enough to go bankrupt. Gupa states to Super-Skrull and everyone present that something darker than Galactus is destroying the worlds and its name is Knull.

Emperor Hulkling dispatches Talos to investigate the Kree and Skrull bases that went dark with Av-Rom, Keeyah, M'lanz, Virtue, and Tarna. Two days later, a Kree/Skrull armada headed by General Kalamari finds Talos' escape pod. While recuperating in the sick bay, Talos tells Kalamari of his encounter with Knull. Talos informs Kalamari that his distress beacon on his escape pod is a warning that Knull is coming. Outside the ship, Knull is riding a symbiote dragon as he swoops in for an attack.

=== Main plot ===
Captain America, Iron Man, She-Hulk, and Captain Marvel scan for Knull's approach. When thousands of symbiote dragons start to arrive, Iron Man detonates the warships, killing half of the symbiote dragons. The Avengers and the Fantastic Four arrive to combat the symbiote dragons while Eddie Brock places his son Dylan Brock in a bunker. Avengers bring Sentry as their big gun to take on Knull, confidently telling Knull that they will just stand there and enjoy watching Sentry take care of him. Sentry flies straight through symbiote-possessed Celestial and takes Knull into Earth's orbit, intending to rip him apart just like he had done to Carnage years before. However, Knull easily overpowers Sentry and rips him in half. Knull assimilates Sentry's alternate personality, the Void, then has the symbiote dragons form a sphere around Earth, cutting off the Sun. Eddie contacts Iron Man informing him that he and the Venom symbiote are going to buy Iron Man time to come up with a plan to defeat Knull. As Venom, Eddie goes to confront Knull and offer his services to him. Knull grabs Venom as he recognizes Eddie as the one who killed Grendel, then he states to Eddie that the Brock he is looking for is Dylan Brock. When Eddie begs for Knull to take him instead, Knull rips the Venom symbiote off him and absorbs it into his body. Knull drops Eddie back to Earth, where he finds that the Avengers have been possessed by symbiotes.

Eddie Brock slams onto a car, critically injuring himself. Valkyrie tells Spider-Man that Eddie Brock is barely alive and they need to do something fast to save his life. Iron Man tells the heroes that he has a plan which is to acquire a small part of a symbiote dragon, have Namor wake up the Black Tide (the ancient Atlantean warriors from Namor's teenage days) in the Mariana Trench, have Blade persuade Dracula to help them, and persuade Mayor Wilson Fisk to hire villains to help defend New York City. Iron Man manages to take control of a symbiote dragon using Extremis and brings the symbiote to Fantastic Four to heal Eddie Brock, but the symbiote starts killing Eddie. Dylan uses his power to destroy the symbiote, but Eddie flatlines.

Silver Surfer passes by the planets that have been attacked by Knull. Invisible Woman and Blade are being overwhelmed by symbiotes and Mister Fantastic wants Spider-Man and Wolverine to escort Dylan Brock out to free the symbiote hordes. The three of them appear to help Invisible Woman and Dylan frees Captain America from his symbiote. Knull finds out where Dylan is and is about to get him when Thor arrives. Together, Thor and Dylan help free some of the possessed heroes. Thor and Knull fight and Thor gains the upper hand until Knull distracts Thor by bringing in his symbiote-possessed Celestials and stabs Thor in the back. Iron Man arrives to use his Extremis-infected symbiote dragon in order to take control of the symbiote-possessed Celestials. Just before Dylan is about to taken away, Silver Surfer arrives after being summoned by Hugin and Munin.

Knull plans to control Dylan since he has the symbiote codex, but Dylan fights back. Jean Grey immobilizes Knull with her psychic powers. She sees Knull's past, and realizes that the God of Light (another name for the Enigma Force) is the one thing that can take down Knull before passing out. Silver Surfer arrives to where the Enigma Force is and frees it from the symbiotes. Knull reels in pain and Eddie Brock is chosen to be the new Captain Universe.

Through the God of Light, Silver Surfer assumes a chrome form and turns his surfboard into a sword. Using his battle axe, Venom starts to shred his way through the symbiote dragons. Venom then picks up Knull, flies into the air, and punches through the symbiote barrier surrounding Earth. Venom plunges his hand into the sun and uses the Uni-Power to vaporize Knull, freeing the symbiote hive from his influence. The Uni-Power leaves Eddie, stating that he has become more than a human as the Venom symbiote reunites with Eddie. As Venom sprouts dragon-like wings and flies into the air, a group of symbiotes and symbiote dragons follow him. The Venom symbiote tells Eddie that he has become the leader of the symbiotes and the new King in Black.

=== Subplots ===
Eddie is in limbo talking with one of the symbiotes and sees Flash Thompson. Flash reveals that even after he died, his Anti-Venom suit kept a codex of his consciousness in the symbiote hive mind. Flash and Eddie go see the heart of the symbiote hive mind and Flash sacrifices himself to take control of the symbiote mind. Knull feels pain, finds Eddie Brock, and grabs him by the throat.

Wilson Fisk decides to put together his own team of superpowered operatives to beat back Knull's creatures and save the city. He secretly meets with eight of these operatives, all known criminals who have been working in the city without Kingpin's blessing: Taskmaster, Mister Fear, Batroc the Leaper, Rhino, Star, Ampere, and Snakehead. To pay Fisk back, these criminals must escort Star (current keeper of one of the Infinity Gems) into battle to kill Knull, but to do that they wll first need to make contact with a man Kingpin believes can help turn the tide against the god. The seven agree to Fisk's plan. Despite objections, this team will be called the Thunderbolts because Kingpin owns the copyright. The team sets out into the city and is promptly attacked by a giant symbiote dragon. Snakehead is devoured, but Mister Fear and Star manage to kill the symbiote dragon. When Ampere exclaims that the team is doomed and he intends to leave, Mister Fear murders him. A symbiote possesses Ampere's corpse, with a horde of symbiotes chasing the Thunderbolts. The team escapes to a fishing boat nearly leaving Batroc behind and finally reach their destination: Ravencroft. Inside, they find the man Fisk believes can defeat Knull: Norman Osborn. Osborn leads the Thunderbolts into retrieving Sentry's corpse so that it can be used as a nuke to destroy Knull's lair. Taskmaster uses Figment's abilities to make it look like the Thunderbolts sacrificed their lives to pull off the mission. After Fisk broadcasts the Thunderbolts' sacrifice during the fight against the symbiote invasion, the Thunderbolts arrive and blackmail him into raising their pay and giving them further missions once Knull is defeated.

Spider-Man gets a panic attack from realizing that he was the reason why the symbiotes are on Earth. While fighting a symbiote dragon, Spider-Man runs into Reptil in his Pteranodon form who is carrying an old woman named Mrs. Volkov who he is trying to get home. While helping Reptil to get Mrs. Volkov to Staten Island, Spider-Man is then attacked by a swarm of symbiote dragons. Spider-Man was able to web some of them up as he and Reptil near the Staten Island ferry. Reptil notes that he cannot turn into anything big enough to combat a symbiote dragon. Spider-Man helps Mrs. Volkov onto the ferry while Reptil dives into the water and emerges as a Mosasaurus; he bites into the symbiote dragon and drags it underwater. As Volkov evacuates the passengers, Spider-Man jury-rigs a harpoon from the ship's generators. When the symbiote dragon emerges, Spider-Man throws an electrified harpoon into the dragon's body, killing it.

== Issues involved ==
=== Prelude issues ===
Title	Issues	Writer	Artist	Colorist	Debut date	Conclusion date
Atlantis Attacks	5	Greg Pak	Ario Anindito	Rachelle Rosenberg	December 2, 2020	
Symbiote Spider-Man: King in Black	1–5	Peter David	Greg Land	Frank D'Armata	November 18, 2020	March 31, 2021

=== Main series ===
Title	Issues	Writer	Artist	Colorist	Debut date	Conclusion date
King in Black	1–5	Donny Cates	Ryan Stegman	Frank Martin	December 2, 2020	April 7, 2021

=== Tie-in issues ===
Title	Issues	Writer(s)	Artist(s)	Colorist	Debut date	Conclusion date
Black Cat (vol. 2)	1–3	Jed MacKay	C. F. Villa	Brian Reber	December 16, 2020	February 24, 2021
Daredevil (vol. 6)	26–27	Chip Zdarsky	Marco Checchetto; Mike Hawthorne	Marcio Menyz	January 27, 2021	February 10, 2021
Deadpool (vol. 6)	10	Kelly Thompson	Gerardo Sandoval	Chris Sotomayor	January 27, 2021	
Fantastic Four (vol. 6)	29–30	Dan Slott	Zé Carlos	Jesus Aburtov	February 10, 2021	March 3, 2021
Guardians of the Galaxy (vol. 6)	10	Al Ewing	Juann Cabal	Federico Blee	January 6, 2021	
King in Black: Black Knight	1	Simon Spurrier	Jesus Saiz		February 3, 2021	
King in Black: Black Panther	1	Geoffrey Thorne	Germán Peralta	Jesus Aburtov	February 10, 2021	
King in Black: Captain America	1	Danny Lore	Mirko Colak	Erick Arciniega	March 3, 2021	
King in Black: Ghost Rider	1	Ed Brisson	Juan Frigeri	Jason Keith	March 31, 2021	
King in Black: Gwenom vs. Carnage	1–3	Seanan McGuire	Flaviano	Rico Renzi	January 13, 2021	March 3, 2021
King in Black: The Immortal Hulk	1	Al Ewing	Aaron Kuder	Frank Martin; Erick Arciniega	December 16, 2020	
King in Black: Iron Man/Doctor Doom	1	Christopher Cantwell	Salvador Larroca	Guru-eFX	December 30, 2020	
King in Black: Marauders	1	Gerry Duggan	Luke Ross	Carlos Lopez	February 3, 2021	
King in Black: Namor	1–5	Kurt Busiek	Ben Dewey; Jonas Scharf	Triona Tree Farrell	December 9, 2020	March 3, 2021
King in Black: Planet of the Symbiotes	1–3	Clay McLeod Chapman; Frank Tieri; Marc Bernadin; Geoffrey Thorne	Guiu Vilanova; Danilo Beyruth; Kyle Hotz; Jan Bazaldua	Dean White; Rachelle Rosenberg	January 13, 2021	March 10, 2021
King in Black: Return of the Valkyries	1–4	Jason Aaron; Torunn Grønbekk	Nina Vakueva	Tamra Bonvillain	January 6, 2021	March 31, 2021
King in Black: Scream	1	Clay McLeod Chapman	Garry Brown	Rachelle Rosenberg	March 24, 2021	
King in Black: Spider-Man	1	Jed Mackay	Michele Bandini	Erick Arciniega; Rachelle Rosenberg	March 17, 2021	
King in Black: Thunderbolts	1–3	Matthew Rosenberg	Juan Ferreyra		January 13, 2021	March 3, 2021
King in Black: Wiccan and Hulkling	1	Tini Howard	Luciano Vecchio	Espen Grundetjern	March 3, 2021	
King in Black Handbook	1	Not applicable			December 2, 2020	
Knull: Marvel Tales	1	Donny Cates	Ryan Stegman; Danilo Beyruth; Mark Bagley	Frank Martin; Cris Peter	December 2, 2020	
Miles Morales: Spider-Man	23	Saladin Ahmed	Carmen Carnero	David Curiel	February 17, 2021	
Savage Avengers	17–19	Gerry Duggan	Kev Walker	Javier Tartaglia	January 27, 2021	March 24, 2021
Spider-Woman (vol. 7)	7–8	Karla Pacheco	Pepe Pérez	Frank D'Armata	December 23, 2020	January 6, 2021
S.W.O.R.D. (vol. 2)	2–4	Al Ewing	Valerio Schiti	Marte Gracia	January 13, 2021	March 17, 2021
The Union	1–2	Paul Grist	Andrea Di Vito	Nolan Woodard	December 2, 2020	January 13, 2021
Venom (vol. 4)	31–34	Donny Cates	Iban Coello	Jesus Aburtov	December 9, 2020	March 24, 2021

== Critical reception ==
The series so far has received positive reviews. According to Comic Book Roundup, the entire series has an average rating of 8.4 out of 10.

== Collected editions ==
Title	Material collected	Format	Pages	Released	ISBN
King In Black	King in Black #1–5	TPB	160	29 Jun 2021	978-1302925468
King in Black: Avengers	King in Black: Black Panther #1, King in Black: Captain America #1, King in Black: Ghost Rider #1, King in Black: The Immortal Hulk #1, King in Black: Iron Man/Doom #1, King in Black: Wiccan and Hulkling #1	TPB	200	27 Jul 2021	978-1302930349
King in Black: Planet of the Symbiotes	King in Black: Planet of the Symbiotes #1–3, King in Black: Black Knight #1	TPB	112	27 Jul 2021	978-1302928100
King in Black: Namor	King in Black: Namor #1–5	TPB	112	20 Jul 2021	978-1302928131
King in Black: Thunderbolts	King in Black: Thunderbolts #1–3, King in Black: Marauders #1	TPB	112	27 Jul 2021	978-1302928094
King in Black: Gwenom vs. Carnage	King in Black: Gwenom vs. Carnage #1–3, King in Black: Scream #1, King in Black: Spider-Man #1	TPB	136	10 Aug 2021	978-1302928117
King in Black: Return Of The Valkyries	King in Black: Return of the Valkyries #1–4	TPB	112	22 Jun 2021	978-1302928087
King in Black: Atlantis Attacks	Atlantis Attacks #1–5	TPB	112	6 Jul 2021	978-1302924560
Symbiote Spider-Man: King in Black	Symbiote Spider-Man: King in Black #1–5	TPB	128	6 Jul 2021	978-1302927578
Spider-Woman Vol. 2: King in Black	Spider-Woman (vol. 7) #6-10	TPB	112	1 Jun 2021	978-1302927523
Black Cat Vol. 4: Queen in Black	Black Cat (vol. 2) #1–4 and material from X-Men: To Serve and Protect #4	TPB	112	8 Jun 2021	978-1302927585
Venom by Donny Cates Vol. 6: King in Black	Venom (vol. 4) #31–35	TPB	192	29 Aug 2021	978-1302926038
Savage Avengers Vol. 4: King in Black	Savage Avengers #17–22	TPB	136	14 Sep 2021	978-1302926298
Omnibuses
King In Black Omnibus	King in Black (2020) #1–5; King in Black: The Immortal Hulk (2020) #1; King in Black: Iron Man/Doctor Doom (2020) #1; King in Black: Black Knight (2021) #1; King in Black: Marauders (2021) #1; King in Black: Black Panther (2021) #1; King in Black: Captain America (2021) #1; King in Black: Wiccan and Hulkling (2021) #1; King in Black: Spider-Man (2021) #1; King in Black: Scream (2021) #1; King in Black: Ghost Rider (2021) #1; King in Black: Gwenom vs. Carnage (2021) #1–3; King in Black: Namor (2021) #1–5; King in Black: Planet of the Symbiotes (2021) #1–3; King in Black: Return of the Valkyries (2021) #1–4; King in Black: Thunderbolts (2021) #1–3; Symbiote Spider-Man: King in Black (2020) #1–5; Black Cat (2020) #1–3; Daredevil (2019) #26–27; Deadpool (2019) #10; Fantastic Four (2018) #29–30; Guardians of the Galaxy (2020) #10; Miles Morales: Spider-Man (2018) #23; S.W.O.R.D. (2020) #2–4; Savage Avengers (2019) #17–19; Spider-Woman (2020) #7–8; Union (2020) #1–2; Venom (2018) #31–34; King in Black Handbook (2021) #1	Omnibus	1,568	6 Dec 2022	Ryan Stegman Fall cover: 978-1302946432
King In Black Omnibus		Omnibus	1,568	6 Dec 2022	Ryan Stegman Dawn DM cover: 978-1302946449
Venomnibus by Cates & Stegman	Venom (2018) #1–35, Annual (2018) #1; Web of Venom: Ve'Nam; Web of Venom: Carnage Born; Web of Venom: Wraith; Absolute Carnage #1–5; King in Black #1–5; material from FCBD 2019 (Spider-Man/Venom), Free Comic Book Day 2020 (Spider-Man/Venom), Incoming! #1, and Carnage Black, White & Blood #2	Omnibus	1,352	13 Dec 2022	Ryan Stegman King In Black cover: 978-1302946418
Venomnibus by Cates & Stegman	Venom (2018) #1–35, Annual (2018) #1; Web of Venom: Ve'Nam; Web of Venom: Carnage Born; Web of Venom: Wraith; Absolute Carnage #1–5; King in Black #1–5; material from FCBD 2019 (Spider-Man/Venom), Free Comic Book Day 2020 (Spider-Man/Venom), Incoming! #1, and Carnage Black, White & Blood #2	Omnibus	1,352	13 Dec 2022	Ryan Stegman Rex DM cover: 978-1302946425

== In other media ==
- Elements from the King in Black serve as the main inspiration for the 2023 video game Marvel's Spider-Man 2
- Elements from the King in Black serve as the main inspiration for the 2024 film Venom: The Last Dance, in which Knull is voiced by Andy Serkis.
- From July to September 2025, "King in Black" was loosely adapted to the video game Marvel Rivals as the season "The Abyss Awakens", with Knull voiced by Michael Scott; consequently, "The Abyss Awakens" formed the basis for a comic-book sequel to "King in Black", entitled "Queen in Black", in 2026.

== Sequel ==
"Queen in Black", a sequel event written by Al Ewing, drawn by Iban Coello, and based on the 2025 Marvel Rivals season "The Abyss Awakens" by NetEase Games, (in-turn loosely inspired by "King in Black") began publication in July 2026, following the Asgardian goddess of death Hela as she imprisons the resurrected Knull, takes over as the Queen in Black, and invades Earth herself with her own army of symbiotes, before Knull, the new King in White, wages a counter-offensive.
