= Crossover (Image Comics) =

American comic book series

- Cover A for issue #1 by Geoff Shaw and Dave Stewart

Publication information
- Publisher: Image Comics; KLC Press
- Format: Monthly
- Genre: Crossover; Fantasy; Metafiction; Science fiction; Superhero
- Publication date: November 4, 2020 — August 18, 2022 (on hiatus)
- No. of issues: 13 (plus 1 special)

Creative team
- Created by: Donny Cates; Dee Cunniffe; John J. Hill; Geoff Shaw
- Written by: Brian Michael Bendis; Donny Cates; Robert Kirkman; Matthew Rosenberg; Chip Zdarsky
- Pencillers: Phil Hester; Megan Hutchison; Michael Avon Oeming; Ande Parks; Geoff Shaw
- Letterer: John J. Hill
- Colorists: Dee Cunniffe; Nick Filardi; Klaus Janson
- Editor: Mark Waid

Collected editions
- Kids Love Chains: ISBN 1-5343-1893-3
- The Ten-Cent Plague: ISBN 1-5343-1928-X

Crossover is an American comic book ongoing series created by Donny Cates, Geoff Shaw, Dee Cunniffe and John J. Hill, and published by Image Comics.

The series debuted on November 4, 2020 and was put on hold on August 18, 2022.

== Premise ==
In 2017, fictional characters from comic books, across various publishers and genres, come to life in the real world, causing mayhem, destruction and death around the city of Denver, Colorado.

Five years later, a ragtag team of humans and characters join forces and embark on a quest to return to Denver, now domed off and containing the displaced characters, to find out the cause behind "The Event".

== Publication history ==
In July 2020, during San Diego Comic-Con, Image Comics announced a comic book series titled Crossover, created by Donny Cates, Geoff Shaw, Dee Cunniffe and John J. Hill. Three years earlier, they created God Country and Redneck, two other Image series.

According to Cates and Shaw during an interview on IGN, the story is inspired by the concept of several crossover summer events that are presented by comic book publishers like DC Comics, Marvel Comics, among others, with the story being inspired by/based on "Avengers: Endgame as Cloverfield", and they also revealed the possibility for other characters from Image and other owners to appear.

Following the release of issue #1 in 3D edition on August 18, 2022, Image put the series on hold to release another comic book titled Vanish, also co-created by Cates.

== Characters ==
=== Main ===
- Ellipses "Ellie" Howell — A survivor of the Event in Denver, Colorado, who works as an employee for a direct market retailer in Otto's comic book store, but now wants to return to her home. She is in fact a character from the fictional world.
- Orion "Ryan" Lowe — The son of an extremist Protestant, who previously has an altercation with Ellie and the others, but according to a prisoner in the Powerhouse (whose identity is later revealed), he will play a role in ending the Event.
- Ava Quinn — A citizen from the other world, who has superpowers of her own and befriends Ellie.
- Otto — The owner of a comic book store in Provo, Utah, who is Ellie's boss.
- Father Lowe — Ryan's abusive father and an extremist Protestant, who strongly believes the Event in Denver is the Devil's work to the point of planning a war against the characters.
- Nathaniel Abrams Pendleton — The Special Director of the Powerhouse, an organization dedicated to hunting characters and even conducting experiments on them, secretly instructs Ryan to find a way to end the Event. Meanwhile, he holds Donny Cates as a prisoner against his will.

=== Guest ===
- Brian Michael Bendis
- Stefano Caselli
- Donny Cates
- Jonathan Hickman
- Megan Hutchison
- Robert Kirkman
- Michael Avon Oeming
- Geoff Shaw
- Brian K. Vaughan
- Chip Zdarsky

=== Returning ===
Character(s)	Franchise	Creator(s)	Owner(s)
Antiquarian	The Paybacks	Donny Cates, Eliot Rahal and Geoff Shaw	Donny Cates, Eliot Rahal and Geoff Shaw (published by Dark Horse Comics, a subsidiary of the Embracer Group)
Archie Andrews	Archie	Vic Bloom, John L. Goldwater and Bob Montana	Archie Comics
Aristus	God Country	Donny Cates, John J. Hill, Geoff Shaw and Jason Wordie	Donny Cates and Geoff Shaw (published by Image Comics)
Avengelyne	Avengelyne	Cathy Christian, Rob Liefeld and Tony Lobito	Rob Liefeld and Little Wolf Productions (published by Image Comics)
Batman	DC Universe	Bill Finger and Bob Kane	DC Comics (Warner Bros. Discovery)
Battle Pope	Battle Pope	Robert Kirkman and Tony Moore	Robert Kirkman and Tony Moore (published by Skybound Entertainment through Image Comics)
Bloodpouch	The Paybacks	Donny Cates, Eliot Rahal and Geoff Shaw	Donny Cates, Eliot Rahal and Geoff Shaw (published by Dark Horse Comics, a subsidiary of the Embracer Group)
Carnage	Marvel Universe	Mark Bagley and David Michelinie	Marvel Comics (The Walt Disney Company)
Christian Walker	Powers	Brian Michael Bendis and Michael Avon Oeming	Jinxworld (currently published by Dark Horse Comics, a subsidiary of the Embracer Group)
Colonel Weird	Black Hammer	Jeff Lemire and Dean Ormston	171 Studios and Dean Ormston (Published by Dark Horse Comics, a subsidiary of the Embracer Group)
Combo Man	Marvel Universe	Hector Collazo, John Statema and Mark Gruenwald	Marvel Comics (The Walt Disney Company)
Cosmic Ghost Rider	Marvel Universe	Donny Cates and Geoff Shaw	Marvel Comics (The Walt Disney Company)
Count Dracula	Dracula	Bram Stoker	In the public domain
The Darkness	Top Cow Universe	Garth Ennis, Marc Silvestri and David Wohl	Top Cow Productions (published through Image Comics)
Deanna "Dee" Quinlan	God Country	Donny Cates, John J. Hill, Geoff Shaw and Jason Wordie	Donny Cates and Geoff Shaw (published by Image Comics)
Denna Pilgrim	Powers	Brian Michael Bendis and Michael Avon Oeming	Jinxworld (currently published by Dark Horse Comics, a subsidiary of the Embracer Group)
Doctor Blaqk	The Paybacks	Donny Cates, Eliot Rahal and Geoff Shaw	Donny Cates, Eliot Rahal and Geoff Shaw (published by Dark Horse Comics, a subsidiary of the Embracer Group)
Doctor Strange	Marvel Universe	Stan Lee and Steve Ditko	Marvel Comics (The Walt Disney Company)
The Driver	The Paybacks	Donny Cates, Eliot Rahal and Geoff Shaw	Donny Cates, Eliot Rahal and Geoff Shaw (published by Dark Horse Comics, a subsidiary of the Embracer Group)
Elizabeth Quinlan	God Country	Donny Cates, John J. Hill, Geoff Shaw and Jason Wordie	Donny Cates and Geoff Shaw (published by Image Comics)
Emmet Quinlan	God Country	Donny Cates, John J. Hill, Geoff Shaw and Jason Wordie	Donny Cates and Geoff Shaw (published by Image Comics)
Emory Rains	The Paybacks	Donny Cates, Eliot Rahal and Geoff Shaw	Donny Cates, Eliot Rahal and Geoff Shaw (published by Dark Horse Comics, a subsidiary of the Embracer Group)
Escape Goat	Buzzkill	Donny Cates, Geoff Shaw and Mark Reznicek	Mark Reznicek and Donny Cates (originally published by Dark Horse Comics, a subsidiary of Embracer Group; now published by Image Comics)
Francis Pierce	Buzzkill	Donny Cates, Geoff Shaw and Mark Reznicek	Mark Reznicek and Donny Cates (originally published by Dark Horse Comics, a subsidiary of Embracer Group; now published by Image Comics)
Gertrude	I Hate Fairyland	Skottie Young	Skottie Young (published by Image Comics)
Ghost	Comics' Greatest World	Barbara Kesel, Jerry Prosser, Mike Richardson, Randy Stradley and Chris Warner	Dark Horse Comics (Embracer Group)
Godzilla	Godzilla	Eiji Tsubaraya, Ishirō Honda and Tomoyuki Tanaka	Toho (North American comic books currently published by IDW Publishing)
High Guard	Buzzkill	Donny Cates, Mark Reznicek and Geoff Shaw	Mark Reznicek and Donny Cates (originally published by Dark Horse Comics, a subsidiary of Embracer Group; now published by Image Comics)
Hit-Girl	Kick-Ass	Mark Millar and John Romita Jr.	Dave and Eggsy Ltd. and John Romita Jr. (published by Millarworld, a Netflix company, through Image Comics)
Hulk	Marvel Universe	Jack Kirby and Stan Lee	Marvel Comics (The Walt Disney Company)
Invincible	Invincible	Robert Kirkman, Ryan Ottley and Cory Walker	Robert Kirkman, Cory Walker and Ryan Ottley (published by Skybound Entertainment through Image Comics)
Janey Quinlan	God Country	Donny Cates, John J. Hill, Geoff Shaw and Jason Wordie	Donny Cates and Geoff Shaw (published by Image Comics)
The Joker	DC Universe	Bill Finger, Bob Kane and Jerry Robinson	DC Comics (Warner Bros. Discovery)
Lucifer	The Wicked + The Divine	Kieron Gillen and Jamie McKelvie	Kieron Gillen and Jamie McKelvie (published by Image Comics)
Luther Strode	The Strange Talent of Luther Strode	Justin Jordan and Tradd Moore	Justin Jordan and Tradd Moore (published by Image Comics)
Madman	Madman	Mike Allred	Mike Allred (currently published by Dark Horse Comics, a subsidiary of Embracer Group)
Max Damage	Irredeemable	Peter Krause and Mark Waid	Boom! Studios
Miss Adventure	The Paybacks	Donny Cates, Eliot Rahal and Geoff Shaw	Donny Cates, Eliot Rahal and Geoff Shaw (published by Dark Horse Comics, a subsidiary of the Embracer Group)
Negan	The Walking Dead	Robert Kirkman and Charlie Adlard	Robert Kirkman (published by Skybound Entertainment through Image Comics)
Night Knight	The Paybacks	Donny Cates, Eliot Rahal and Geoff Shaw	Donny Cates, Eliot Rahal and Geoff Shaw (published by Dark Horse Comics, a subsidiary of the Embracer Group)
Panteradactyl	Buzzkill	Donny Cates, Mark Reznicek and Geoff Shaw	Mark Reznicek and Donny Cates (originally published by Dark Horse Comics, a subsidiary of Embracer Group; now published by Image Comics)
Rawhide Kid	Marvel Universe	Bob Brown and Stan Lee	Marvel Comics (The Walt Disney Company)
Roy Quinlan	God Country	Donny Cates, John J. Hill, Geoff Shaw and Jason Wordie	Donny Cates and Geoff Shaw (published by Image Comics)
RX-78-2 Gundam	Gundam	Yoshiyuki Tomino and Hajime Yatate	Sotsu/Sunrise (Bandai Namco Holdings)
Savage Dragon	Savage Dragon	Erik Larsen	Erik Larsen (published by Image Comics)
Scooby-Doo	Scooby-Doo	Joe Ruby, Ken Spears and Iwao Takamoto	Cartoon Network Studios/Hanna-Barbera (Warner Bros. Discovery) (comic books published by DC Comics)
ShadowHawk	ShadowHawk	Jim Valentino	Jim Valentino/Shadowline (published through Image Comics)
Shoxxx	Buzzkill	Donny Cates, Mark Reznicek and Geoff Shaw	Mark Reznicek and Donny Cates (originally published by Dark Horse Comics, a subsidiary of Embracer Group; now published by Image Comics)
Soviet Nunchuck	The Paybacks	Donny Cates, Eliot Rahal and Geoff Shaw	Donny Cates, Eliot Rahal and Geoff Shaw (published by Dark Horse Comics, a subsidiary of the Embracer Group)
Spawn	Spawn	Todd McFarlane	Todd McFarlane Productions (published through Image Comics)
Spider-Man	Marvel Universe	Steve Ditko and Stan Lee	Marvel Comics (The Walt Disney Company)
The Squid	Watchmen	Dave Gibbons, John Higgins and Alan Moore	DC Comics (Warner Bros. Discovery)
Starfox	Marvel Universe	Jim Starlin and Mike Friedrich	Marvel Comics (The Walt Disney Company)
Stay Puft Marshmallow Man	Ghostbusters	Dan Aykroyd and Bill Bryan	Columbia Pictures (Sony)
Superman	DC Universe	Joe Shuster and Jerry Siegel	DC Comics (Warner Bros. Discovery) and the Jerry Siegel Family
The Thing	Marvel Universe	Jack Kirby and Stan Lee	Marvel Comics (The Walt Disney Company)
Thor	Marvel Universe	Jack Kirby, Stan Lee and Larry Lieber	Marvel Comics (The Walt Disney Company)
The Tick	The Tick	Ben Edlund	Ben Edlund (published by New England Comics)
Valofax	God Country	Donny Cates, John J. Hill, Geoff Shaw and Jason Wordie	Donny Cates and Geoff Shaw (published by Image Comics)
Witchblade	Top Cow Universe	Brian Haberlin, Marc Silvestri, Michael Turner and David Wohl	Top Cow Productions (published through Image Comics)
Wonder Woman	DC Universe	William Moulton Marston and H. G. Peter	DC Comics (Warner Bros. Discovery)

== Issues ==
Issue	Title	Written by	Drawn by	Colored by	Publication date
#1	"Kids Love Chains: Part One"	Donny Cates	Geoff Shaw	Dee Cunniffe	November 4, 2020
In 2017, the city of Denver was invaded by superheroes and supervillains fighting each other, causing destruction and death, until a superhero created a force field around the city. Five years later, most of society has rejected those characters, but Ellie Howell is one of the few people who still believes in them. She works for a comic book store located in Provo, until one day, her boss Otto spots Ava, a fictional character who somehow got evacuated from Denver. This alarms a mob of fanatical Protestants led by Father Lowe, who forces his son Ryan to toss a Molotov cocktail against the shop, causing it to explode. Ava reveals a figure helped them escape.
#2	"Kids Love Chains: Part Two"	Donny Cates	Geoff Shaw	Dee Cunniffe	December 9, 2020
Following the burnout of their comic book shop, Ellie is given asylum by Otto. She offers herself to return Ava to her parents, unaware she has superpowers of her own. During his temporary imprisonment, Ryan is secretly recruited by Nathaniel Abrams Pendleton, Special Director of the Powerhouse, as he reveals that Ryan would play a major role in ending the Event in Denver. In the meantime, there are murders against comic book writers and artists, like Brian K. Vaughan.
#3	"Kids Love Chains: Part Three"	Donny Cates	Geoff Shaw	Dee Cunniffe	January 6, 2021
While Ellie, Otto and Ava travel to Denver, they meet Ryan, who decided to escape from his father. At the same time, a Gundam is fighting a kaiju, but the group is rescued by the Paybacks, who were sent by Madman, the figure that helped Ava and several others to escape the dome.
#4	"Kids Love Chains: Part Four"	Donny Cates	Geoff Shaw	Dee Cunniffe	February 24, 2021
Madman reveals that Ava's parents are back in the fictional world through a portal inside Denver, and Payback member Doctor Blaqk reveals he was the one that put the dome over the city, but as long as the characters stay away from it, their powers weaken. The group travels to the National Event Memorial and Museum Center, where they meet Deanna Quinlan, granddaughter of Emmet Quinlan and keeper of the sword Valofax. Meanwhile, Father Lowe keeps a prisoner inside his ministry compound, while Director Pendleton receives orders to advance the experiments of the "Amalgam Program".
#5	"Kids Love Chains: Part Five"	Donny Cates	Geoff Shaw	Dee Cunniffe	March 31, 2021
Father Lowe uses his prisoner as a suicide bomb inside the Powerhouse, as part of his plan to start a war against the characters. The group travels inside the dome in Denver, where they are confronted by an army of Amalgams sent by the government, but as an army of planes begin to launch missiles, Ava unleashes her powers to destroy them. As Madman fails to convince her to stop, Ryan has no choice but to shoot Ava with the same special gun that he was given by Pendleton.
#6	"Kids Love Chains: Conclusion"	Donny Cates	Geoff Shaw	Dee Cunniffe	April 28, 2021
After Ellie prevents Ryan from shooting Ava, the group reunites to find the portal. However, many characters still fight each other after years. The team succeeds in finding the portal and Ava returns to her world with her parents. Ellie and Ryan escape from the dome, but Otto gets injured and left behind in the process. Inside an apartment, Ellie reveals to Ryan that she is not a real human, but a character from the fictional world.
#7	—N/a	Chip Zdarsky	Phil Hester and Ande Parks	Dee Cunniffe	June 30, 2021
In the wake of the murders against comic book celebrities, Steve Murray is on the run when he meets his alter ego "Chip Zdarsky". While trying to escape by car, they have a crash, and when Chip is killed by an assailant, Steve escapes and reports what happened to detectives Christian Walker and Denna Pilgrim from the Powers Division.
#8	"Meanwhile: Part One"	Donny Cates	Geoff Shaw	Dee Cunniffe	September 29, 2021
While Ellie and Ryan deal with their issues, they are taken to the Powerhouse by the Powers Division. Pendleton informs Ryan about the recent murders against comic book celebrities, and that he has Father Lowe in custody for the previous bombing. In the meantime, the mysterious prisoner gets upset for how the order of events has been changed due to Ellie's actions.
#9	"Meanwhile: Part Two"	Donny Cates	Geoff Shaw	Dee Cunniffe	November 3, 2021
When Walker and Pilgrim interrogate Ellie about the murders, Father Lowe reveals to Ryan that he knows the killer's identity and intentions. Walker and Pilgrim then investigate a crime scene, where the victim is Scott Snyder and the murder weapon is a Batarang.
#10	"Meanwhile: Part Three"	Brian Michael Bendis and Donny Cates	Michael Avon Oeming and Geoff Shaw	Nick Filardi and Dee Cunniffe	December 8, 2021
Pendleton reveals most of his past as a family man who got widowed after the Event, and decided to solve the mystery behind what happened. He also knows the mysterious prisoner inside the Powerhouse is in fact Donny Cates himself.
#11	"Meanwhile: Part Four"	Donny Cates	Geoff Shaw	Dee Cunniffe	February 2, 2022
In a previous interrogation, Cates reveals to Pendleton he only wanted to make a love story, but the idea was cancelled before the Event happened. Pendleton forces Cates to remain as a prisoner in the Powerhouse until an "ending" is made. In the present, when Ellie initially does not believe in Cates' words, he secretly gives her a letter detailing the coming events. When Walker and Pilgrim take Father Love to a baseball stadium in search for the killer, it was revealed that Negan was the material author, but it was Lowe who orchestrated those killings.
#12	"Meanwhile: Part Five"	Robert Kirkman and Donny Cates	Phil Hester and Geoff Shaw	Klaus Janson and Dee Cunniffe	March 2, 2022
Sometime after the Event, Negan met and killed his creator, Robert Kirkman, as revenge for the life he gave him. Back in the present, Negan reveals to Walker and Pilgrim about why he joined Father Lowe, as they both share the same interest of freeing the real world from all fictional characters. Besides, he met another person more powerful than Cates. Within the Powerhouse, Cates manages to use his powers to lock Pendleton in his own room, while freeing Ellie (reunited by Valofax) and Ryan (armed with a lightsaber) to save Walker and Pilgrim.
#13	"Meanwhile: Conclusion"	Donny Cates	Geoff Shaw	Dee Cunniffe	May 11, 2022
The humans and characters go into an all-out war, as Negan takes Donny hostage, but Ellie uses Valofax to impale them both. When Father Lowe tries to become a suicide bomb, Ryan tries to reason with him, but Pendleton kills him by using a special armor. In his dying moment, Donny reveals to Ellie and Ryan that they must kill artist Geoff Shaw in order to put an end to the Event in Denver.
#1	3D Special side story	Donny Cates and Matthew Rosenberg	Megan Hutchison	Dee Cunniffe	August 18, 2022

== Reception ==
Oscar Maltby wrote for Newsarama that the first issue was "bold as hell" and an intriguing start.

Issue	Publication date	Critic rating	Critic reviews	Ref.
#1	November 4, 2020	8.9/10	26	
#2	December 9, 2020	7.9/10	15	
#3	January 6, 2021	8.4/10	11	
#4	February 24, 2021	8.2/10	14	
#5	March 31, 2021	8.0/10	12	
#6	April 28, 2021	9.2/10	11	
#7	June 30, 2021	8.5/10	7	
#8	September 29, 2021	8.9/10	6	
#9	November 3, 2021	9.3/10	6	
#10	December 8, 2021	8.1/10	6	
#11	February 2, 2022	9.1/10	6	
#12	March 2, 2022	8.9/10	4	
#13	May 11, 2022	9.2/10	6	
Overall		8.7/10	130	

== Collected editions ==
Title	Volume	Material collected	Pages	Publication date	ISBN
Crossover, Volume 1: Kids Love Chains	1	Crossover #1−6	176	May 26, 2021	1534318933, 978-1534318939
Crossover, Volume 2: The Ten-Cent Plague	2	Crossover #7−13	176	June 8, 2022	153431928X, 978-1534319288
