= Donny Cates =

American comic book writer

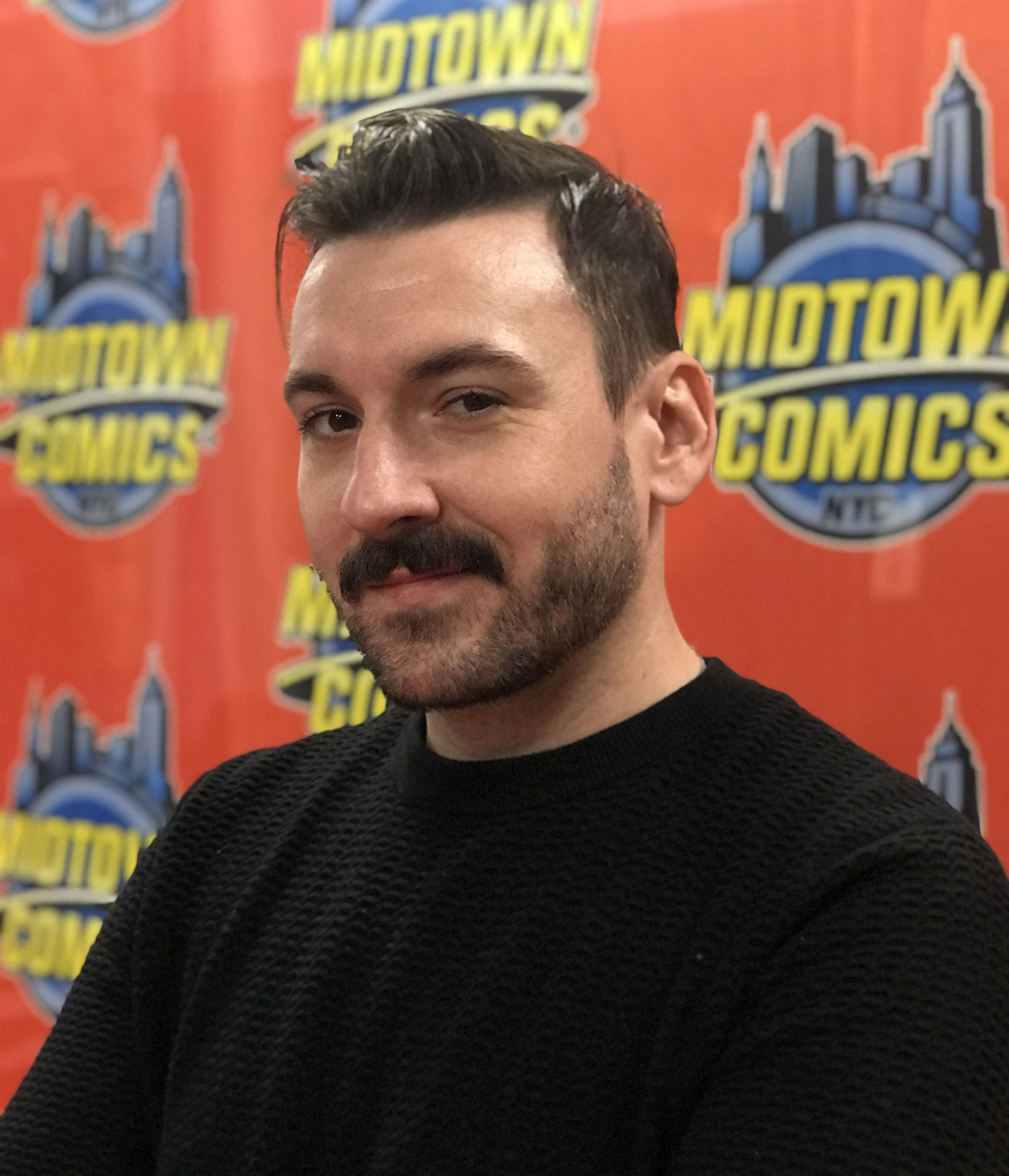
- Cates at a 2019 signing for Venom (Vol 4) #11 at Midtown Comics in Manhattan
- Born: September 14, 1984 (age 42) Dallas, Texas, U.S.
- Area: Writer
- Notable works: Hulk; Thor; Venom; Thanos; Doctor Strange; Redneck; Babyteeth; God Country

Donny Cates (born September 14, 1984) is an American comic book writer, artist, and podcaster, known for his work on titles like Venom, Thanos, Doctor Strange, Thor, and Hulk.

== Early life ==
Donny Cates was born in Dallas, Texas. Raised in Garland, Texas, Cates states that he was taught to read by his father using comic books. Cates graduated from Garland High School and attended the Savannah College of Art and Design, where he would meet future artistic collaborators Tradd Moore and Geoff Shaw. Cates majored in sequential art, but left the school after being accepted into a Marvel internship program. While interning, Cates stole a Diamond Distributors Gem Award awarded to Astonishing X-Men #1. At the advice of Marvel editor Mark Peniccia, Cates left the program after a year to pursue writing his own comics. After a chance meeting with a Dark Horse Comics staffer at C2E2, Cates was given the opportunity to write short stories for the company.

== Career ==
Cates' first comic work was a short story in Dark Horse Presents vol. 2 #24, released in August 2013. Co-written by himself and Eliot Rahal, the title of this story was Hunter Quaid: Armageddon Outta Here. It was followed up three issues later with Hunter Quaid: The Only Things We Have to Fear… are Nazis and Creepy Monsters. Satisfied with these stories, Dark Horse gave Cates the green light for later projects like Buzzkill, The Ghost Fleet with Daniel Warren Johnson and The Paybacks. Between 2016 and 2017 Cates also wrote stories for IDW Publishing, including an entry in Star Trek: Waypoint and a one-shot, Star Trek: Deviations. Cates eventually began writing for Image Comics, where he released God Country. With this title he attracted the attention of editors at Marvel, who offered him a contract.

His first long-term Marvel works were runs on Doctor Strange and Thanos. After the success of these titles, Cates was given writing duties on Venom, where he was paired with artist and podcaster Ryan Stegman. This led to him penning multiple company-wide events, including Absolute Carnage and King in Black. In January 2020, Cates took over as the new writer of Thor with Nic Klein as artist. Later that year, he would reteam with God Country artist Geoff Shaw on the book Crossover. In June 2021, Cates and Stegman started their own production company entitled KLC Press, named after a Todd McFarlane quote ("Kids Love Chains"), with its first title set to be the book Vanish by Cates and Stegman. In November that same year, Cates became the new writer of Hulk, with Ryan Ottley joining as artist. In June 2022, it was announced Vanish would receive a physical release via Image Comics.

In August 2023, it was revealed that he provided "additional literary material" for Kraven the Hunter. In October 2024, it was confirmed that he was allowed to read the screenplay for Venom: The Last Dance and consulted alongside Stegman in an advisory relationship due to the film's adaptation of their character Knull.

== Personal life ==
Cates lived in Austin, Texas with his ex-wife, comic artist Megan Hutchison. They hosted the comic review podcast, The Devil’s AdvoCATES Book Club.

In 2022, Cates was seriously injured in a car accident that gave him amnesia with no recollection of the prior six months of his life. During this time, he also went through a divorce. Cates was forced to pull out of numerous writing projects as a result.

== Bibliography ==
=== Aftershock Comics ===
- Babyteeth (with Garry Brown, June 2017–ongoing)
  - Volume 1 (collects #1-5, tpb, with Garry Brown, 120 pages, 2017, ISBN 978-1935002772)
  - Volume 2 (collects #6-10, tpb, with Garry Brown, 120 pages, 2018, ISBN 978-1935002703)
  - Volume 3 (collects #11-15, tpb, with Garry Brown, 120 pages, 2019, ISBN 978-1949028058)
  - Year One (collects #1-10, hc, 240 pages, 2019, ISBN 978-1935002420)
- Relay #1–6 (co-plotter with Zack Thompson, with Andy Clarke and Dalibor Talajic, May 2018–April 2019) collected as Relay Vol. 1: Reality Denied (tpb, 144 pages, 2019, ISBN 978-1949028010)

=== Dark Horse Comics ===
- Dark Horse Presents vol. 2 #24: "Hunter Quaid: Armageddon Outta Here" (co-writer with Eliot Rahal, with Melissa Curtin, May 2013)
- Dark Horse Presents vol. 2 #27: "Hunter Quaid: The Only Things We Have to Fear... Are Nazis and Creepy Monsters" (co-writer with Eliot Rahal, with Melissa Curtin, August 2013)
- Buzzkill (co-writer with Mark Reznicek, 4-issue limited series, with Geoff Shaw, September–December 2013) collected as Buzzkill (tpb, 104 pages, 2014, ISBN 978-1616553050; republished by Image Comics in 2017, ISBN 978-1534304383)
- The Ghost Fleet (8-issue limited series, with Daniel Warren Johnson, November 2014–June 2015) collected as The Ghost Fleet: The Whole Goddamned Thing (tpb, 144 pages, 2017, ISBN 978-1534304406)
- Dark Horse Presents vol. 3 #11: "The Paybacks: Downhill Ski" (co-writer with Eliot Rahal, with Geoff Shaw, January 2015) collected in The Paybacks Collection (tpb, 224 pages, 2018, ISBN 978-1506704821)
- The Paybacks vol. 1 (September–December 2015) collected in The Paybacks Collection
  - Volume 1: Payback's A Bitch (co-writer with Eliot Rahal, collects #1-4, with Geoff Shaw, 104 pages, ISBN 978-1616558758)

=== Heavy Metal ===
- Interceptor (6-issue limited series, with Dylan Burnett, January–May 2016) collected as Interceptor Vol. 1 (tpb, 144 pages, 2019, ISBN 978-1939424464)
- The Paybacks vol. 2 #1-4 (co-writer with Eliot Rahal, with Geoff Shaw, July–November 2016) collected in The Paybacks Collection

=== House of Waxwork ===
- House of Waxwork #2: "Nowhere Wolf" (with Marty Davis, February 2018)

=== Image Comics ===
- God Country (6-issue limited series, with Geoff Shaw, January–June 2017) collected as God Country (tpb, 168 pages, 2017, ISBN 978-1534302341)
- Redneck (with Lisandro Estherren, April 2017–ongoing)
  - Volume 1: Deep in the Heart (collects #1-6, tpb, 128 pages, 2017, ISBN 978-1534303317)
  - Volume 2: The Eyes Upon You (collects #7-12, tpb, 128 pages, 2018, ISBN 978-1534306653)
  - Volume 3: Longhorns (collects #13-18, tpb, 128 pages, 2019, ISBN 978-1534310506)
  - Volume 4: Lone Star (collects #19-24, tpb, 128 pages, 2019, ISBN 978-1534313675)
  - Volume 5: Tall Tales (collects #25-30, tpb, 128 pages, 2021, ISBN 978-1534316096)
- Crossover (with Geoff Shaw, November 2020–ongoing)
  - Volume 1: Kids Love Chains (collects #1-6, tpb, 176 pages, 2021, ISBN 978-1534318939)
  - Volume 2: The Ten-Cent Plague (collects #7-13, tpb, 176, 2022, ISBN 978-1534319288)
- Vanish (with Ryan Stegman, September 2022-June 2023)
  - Volume 1 (collects #1-4, tpb, 112 pages, 2023, ISBN 978-1534325906)
  - Volume 2 (collects #5-8, with Netho Diaz, and V Ken Marrion, tpb, 112 pages, 2023, ISBN 9781534399631)

=== IDW Publishing ===
- Star Trek: Waypoint #1 (with Mack Chater, September 2016), collected in Star Trek: Waypoint (tpb, 144 pages, 2017, ISBN 978-1684050178)
- Star Trek: Deviations (one-shot, with Josh Hood, March 2017)

=== Marvel Comics ===
- Iron Man Presented by DJI #1 (with Rhoald Marcellius, June 2015)
- Secret Wars: Battleworld #2: "Ross Against The Machine" (with Marco Turini, June 2015) collected in Secret Wars Journal/Battleworld (tpb, 248 pages, 2016, ISBN 978-0785195801)
- Captain America: Steve Rogers #18–19 (co-writer with Nick Spencer, with Javier Pina and Andres Guinaldo, June–July 2017) collected in Captain America: Secret Empire (tpb, 136 pages, 2017, ISBN 978-1302908492)
- Captain America: Sam Wilson #24 (co-writer with Nick Spencer, with Joe Bennett, July 2017) collected in Captain America: Secret Empire
- Doctor Strange vol. 1 (January–July 2018) collected as Doctor Strange by Donny Cates (hc, 360 pages, 2019, ISBN 978-1302915292)
  - Volume 1: God of Magic (collects #381-385, tpb, with Gabriel Hernandez Walta and Niko Henrichon, 136 pages, ISBN 978-1302910648)
  - Volume 2: City of Sin (collects #386-390, tpb, with Niko Henrichon, Frazer Irving, and Chip Zdarsky, 112 pages, ISBN 978-1302910655)
- Thanos vol. 2 #13–18; Annual #1 (with Geoff Shaw, January–June 2018) collected in Thanos Wins (tpb, 160 pages, 2018, ISBN 978-1302905590)
- Doctor Strange: Damnation (co-writer with Nick Spencer, 4-issue limited series, with Szymon Kudranski and Rod Reis, April–July 2018) collected in Doctor Strange: Damnation The Complete Collection (tpb, 336 pages, 2018, ISBN 978-1302912604)
- Venom vol. 4 (May 2018–April 2021)
  - Volume 1: Rex (collects #1-6, tpb, with Ryan Stegman, 136 pages, 2018, ISBN 978-1302913069)
  - Volume 2: The Abyss (collects #7-12, tpb, with Ryan Stegman, Iban Coello, and Joshua Cassara, 136 pages, 2019, ISBN 978-1302913076)
  - Volume 3: Absolute Carnage (collects #16-19, Web of Venom: Funeral Pyre #1, tpb, with Juan Gedeon and Iban Coello, 112 pages, 2020, ISBN 978-1302919979)
  - Volume 4: Venom Island (collects #21-25, tpb, with Mark Bagley, 136 pages, 2020, ISBN 978-1302920203)
  - Volume 5: Venom Beyond (collects #26-30, tpb, with Iban Coello, Juan Gedeon, and Luke Ross, 128 pages, 2021, ISBN 978-1302920210)
  - Volume 6: King in Black (collects #31-34 and Venom vol. 1 #200, tpb, with Iban Coello, Juan Gedeon, and Luke Ross, 200 pages, 2021, ISBN 978-1302926038)
  - Volume 1 (collects #1-12, hc, 280 pages, 2019, ISBN 978-1302919672)
  - Volume 2 (collects #16-25, hc, 248 pages, 2021, ISBN 978-1302923884)
  - Volume 3 (collects Venom story from Free Comic Book Day 2020 (Spider-Man/Venom) 1, #26-35, hc, 320 pages, 2022, ISBN 978-1302931926)
  - Web of Venom: Ve'Nam (one-shot, with Juanan Ramirez, August 2018) collected in Venom Unleashed Vol. 1 (tpb, 136 pages, 2019, ISBN 978-1302917234)
- Cosmic Ghost Rider (5-issue limited series, with Dylan Burnett, September 2018–January 2019) collected in Cosmic Ghost Rider: Baby Thanos Must Die (tpb, 112 pages, 2019, ISBN 978-1302913533)
- Death of The Inhumans (5-issue limited series, with Ariel Olivetti, September 2018–January 2019) collected in Death of The Inhumans (tpb, 336 pages, 2018, ISBN 978-1302912604)
- Venom Annual #1: "Tall Tales" (one-shot, with Kevin Walker, October 2018)
- Marvel Knights 20th (co-writer with Matthew Rosenberg, Tim Howard, and Vita Ayala, 6-issue limited series, with Travel Foreman, Niko Henrichon, Damian Couceiro, Joshua Cassara and Kim Jacinto, November 2018–January 2019)
- Web of Venom: Carnage Born (one-shot, with Danilo Beyruth, November 2020) collected in Venom Unleashed Vol. 1
- Guardians of the Galaxy vol. 5 (January 2019–December 2019) collected in Guardians of the Galaxy by Donny Cates (hc, 328 pages, 2021, ISBN 978-1302926731)
  - Volume 1: The Final Gauntlet (collects #1-6, tpb, with Geoff Shaw, 144 pages, 2019, ISBN 978-1302915889)
  - Volume 2: Faithless (collects #7-12, Annual #1, tpb, with John McCrea, Cory Smith, Geoff Shaw, Dylan Burnett, Ariel Olivetti, and Tradd Moore, 176 pages, 2020, ISBN 978-1302915896)
- Story in Free Comic Book Day 2019 Spider-Man/Venom (one-shot, with Ryan Stegman, May 2019)
- Silver Surfer: Black (5-issue limited series, with Tradd Moore, June 2019–October 2019) collected in Silver Surfer: Black (tpb, 120 pages, 2020, ISBN 978-1302927844)
- Absolute Carnage (5-issue limited series, with Ryan Stegman, August–November 2019) collected in Absolute Carnage (tpb, 200 pages, 2020, ISBN 978-1302919085)
- Marvel Comics #1000: "The Route" (one-shot, with Geoff Shaw, August 2019) collected in Marvel Comics #1000 (hc, 144 pages, 2020, ISBN 978-1302921378)
- Revenge of the Cosmic Ghost Rider: "Semper Fight" (with Geoff Shaw, December 2019)
- Thor vol. 6 (January 2020–June 2023)
  - Volume 1: The Devourer King (collects #1-6, tpb, with Nic Klein, 144 pages, 2020, ISBN 978-1302920869)
  - Volume 2: Prey (collects #7-14, tpb, with Nic Klein and Aaron Kuder, 176 pages, 2021, ISBN 978-1302920876)
  - Volume 3: Revelations (collects #15-18, Thor Annual (2021) #1, tpb, with Nic Klein and Alessandro Vitti, 120 pages, 2021, ISBN 978-1302926120)
  - Volume 4: God of Hammers (collects #19-24, tpb, with Nic Klein, 184 pages, 2022, ISBN 978-1302926137)
  - Volume 5: The Legacy of Thanos (collects #27-30, and Thanos: Death Notes, tpb, with Jason Aaron, Al Ewing, J. Michael Straczynski, Kyle Starks, Christopher Cantwell, Torunn Grønbekk, Salvador Larroca, Ron Lim, Nic Klein, and Geoff Shaw, 128 pages, 2023, ISBN 9781302932756)
  - Volume 6: Blood of the Fathers (collects #31-35, tpb, with Torunn Grønbekk, Nic Klein, Sergio Fernandez Davila, Juan Gedeon, 152 pages, 2023, ISBN 9781302947606)
- Incoming!: "45–48" (one-shot, with Ryan Stegman, February 2020)
- Story in Free Comic Book Day 2020 Spider-Man/Venom (one-shot, with Ryan Stegman, July 2020)
- Fortnite X Marvel - Nexus War: Thor (one-shot, with Greg Land, August 2020)
- Web of Venom: Wraith (one-shot, with Guiu Villanova, September 2020)
- King in Black #1–5 (with Ryan Stegman, December 2020–April 2021) collected in King in Black (tpb, 144 pages, 2021, ISBN 978-1302925468)
- Wolverine: Black, White & Blood #3: "Burn" (with Chris Bachalo, February 2021) collected in Wolverine: Black, White & Blood Treasury Edition (tpb, 136 pages, 2021, ISBN 978-1302928490)
- Story in Carnage: Black, White & Blood #2 (with Kyle Hotz, April 2021)
- Story in Free Comic Book Day 2021 Avengers/Hulk (one-shot, with Ryan Ottley, May 2021)
- Hulk vol. 5 (with Ryan Ottley, November 2021 – April 2023)
  - Volume 1: Smashtronaut! (collects #1–6, tpb, 160 pages, 2022, ISBN 978-1302925994)
  - Volume 2: Hulk Planet (collects 9–14, tpb, 136 pages, 2023, ISBN 9781302926007)
- Hulk Vs. Thor: Banner of War: Alpha (one-shot, with Martin Coccolo, May 2022) collected in Hulk Vs. Thor: Banner of War (tpb, 128 pages, 2022, ISBN 978-1302946630)

=== Panel Syndicate ===
- The One You Feed (5-issue limited series, with Dylan Burnett, October 2020–ongoing); to be republished by Image Comics

=== Vault Comics ===
- Reactor #1–3 (with Dylan Burnett, November 2017–April 2018)

=== Others ===
- Venom: The Last Dance (2024) Creative consultant
- Kraven the Hunter (2024) Additional Literary Material
