= Ryan Stegman =

American comic book artist (born 1981)

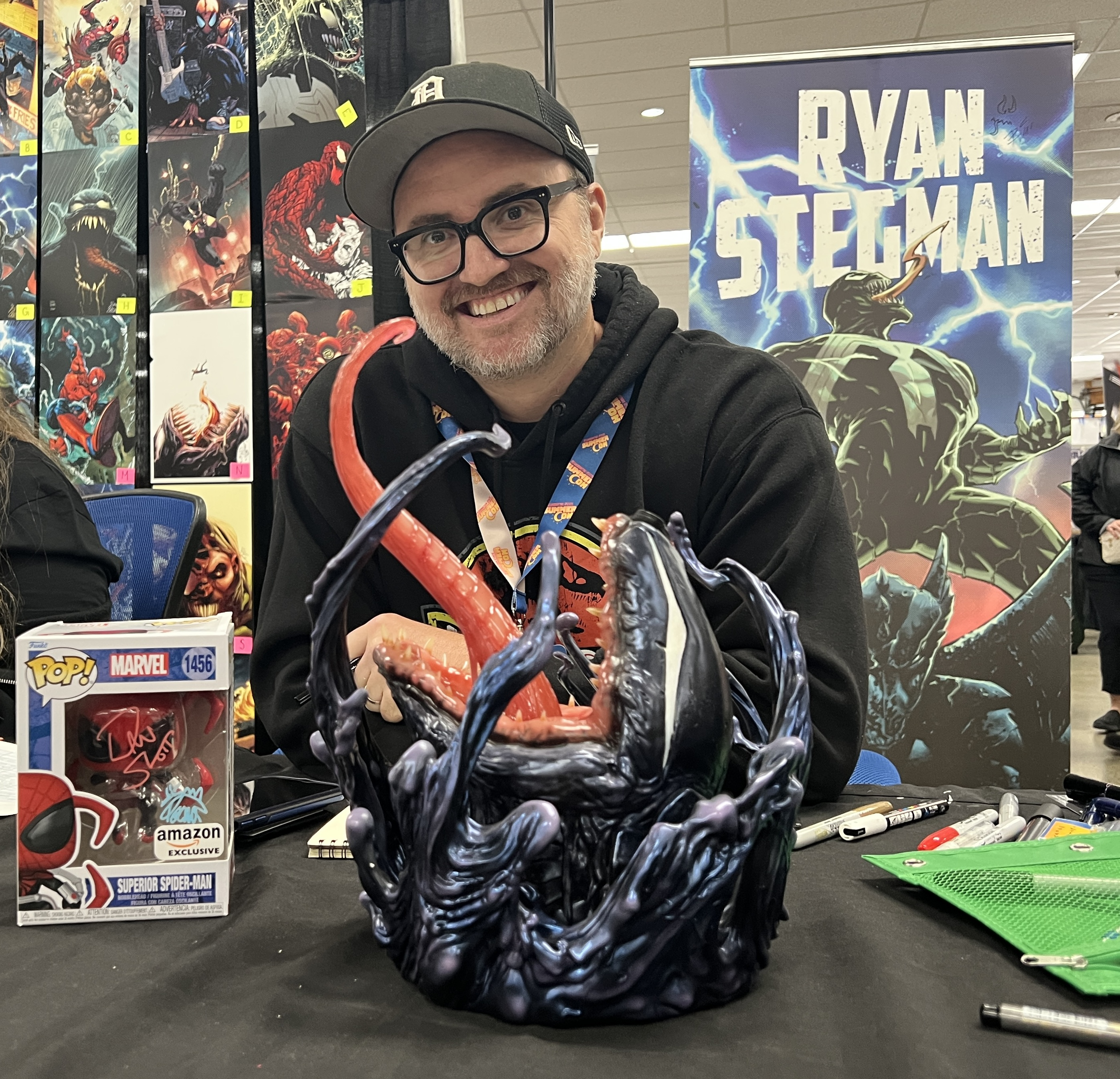
- Stegman at Washington Summercon on June 21, 2025.
- Born: June 24, 1981 (age 45) Anderson, Michigan, U.S.
- Areas: Writer, Penciller
- Notable works: Venom; Superior Spider-Man; King in Black; Absolute Carnage; Vanish; Inhumans
- Relatives: Jude Stys

Ryan Stegman is a comic book artist, writer, and podcaster best known for his work on Marvel Comics characters including She-Hulk, X-23, Spider-Man and Venom.

== Career ==
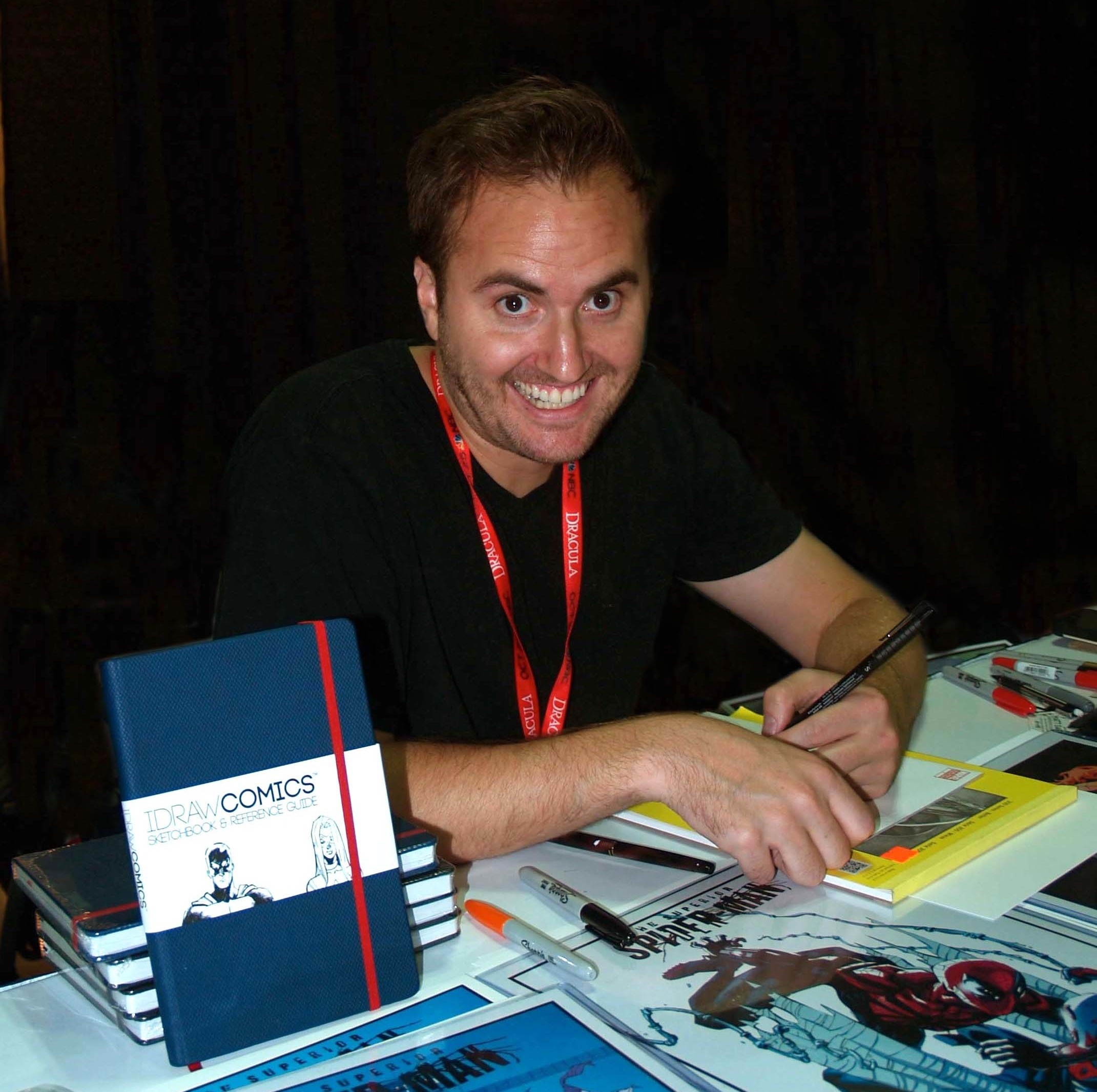
Stegman at the New York Comic Con in Manhattan, October 12, 2013.

His first comic work was titled Magician Apprentice, based on the novel Magician published by Doubleday. In 2010, having already contributed to several works for the company, he signed an exclusivity agreement with Marvel. In late 2010, Stegman's She-Hulks was launched.

In January 2013 he and writer Dan Slott started the series The Superior Spider-Man. the series featuring the adventures of Spider-Man, now inhabited by the mind of Doctor Octopus. The first issue won the 2013 Diamond Gem Award for Comic Book of the Year Over $3.00. As part of the All-New, All-Different Marvel relaunch of Marvel's titles, Stegman teamed with writer Gerry Duggan to launch The Uncanny Avengers vol. 3 series in October 2015. From 2016 to 2017, he co-wrote The Amazing Spider-Man: Renew Your Vows. In 2018, Marvel Comics relaunched a new volume of Venom, with Donny Cates as writer and Stegman as artist. He drew the Absolute Carnage limited series in 2019. In July 2020, Marvel announced that Stegman would draw the limited series King in Black, the first issue of which was released in December 2020. In August 2021, Stegman established a new publishing imprint entitled KLC Press, alongside Donny Cates. In September 2022, he and Cates released the first issue of Vanish, Stegman's first creator-owned ongoing series. In May 2023, it was announced that Stegman would be co-writing a new book for KLC Press, entitled The Schlub, along with Kenny Porter, with Tyrell Cannon serving as illustrator. The book began publication in August 2023 from Image Comics. In March 2023, it was announced that Stegman would serve as the illustrator for the upcoming From the Ashes relaunch of X-Men written by Jed MacKay, with the book set to launch in July 2024.

In October 2024, it was confirmed by Kelly Marcel that Stegman was consulted in an advisory relationship alongside Cates for the adaptation of their character Knull in Venom: The Last Dance.

== Bibliography ==
=== Interior work ===
==== Marvel Comics ====
- Magician Apprentice #4–12 (December 2006–February 2008)
- Marvel Adventures Spider-Man #39, 41 (July–September 2008)
- The Incredible Hercules #129–131 (July–September 2009)
- Riftwar #1–5 (July–December 2009)
- Incredible Hulk: #606–608, 714: "Where Is Wolverine?" (back-up stories, March 2010–May 2018)
- Sif #1 (one-shot, June 2010)
- World War Hulks: "Object of Desire" (one-shot, June 2010)
- Heroic Age: Prince of Power #1 (July 2010)
- She-Hulks #1–4 (January–April 2011)
- X-23 vol. 3 #8–9 (May–June 2011)
- The Amazing Spider-Man: #665, 792–793 (September 2011–February 2018)
- Fear Itself: Hulk vs. Dracula: #1–3 (November–December 2011)
- Point One: "The Scarlet Thread" (one-shot, January 2012)
- Scarlet Spider vol. 2 #1–4, 6 (March–August 2012)
- Fantastic Four vol. 1 #609–611 (October–December 2012)
- Superior Spider-Man: #1–3, 9–10, 17–19 (March 2013–December 2013)
- Wolverine vol. 6 #1–4 (April–June 2014)
- Inhuman #4-12, Annual (October 2014–July 2015)
- Uncanny Inhumans #0: Evolution (writer, w/ Ryan Lee, June 2015)
- Avengers vol. 6 #0: "The Night That Hell Froze Over" (December 2015)
- Uncanny Avengers vol. 3 #1–4, 7–8, 13–14 (December 2015–November 2016)
- Amazing Spider-Man: Renew Your Vows #1–4, 6–12 (co-writer/artist on #8, co-plotter & writer on #9 w/ Juan Frigeri, writer on #10–12 w/ Nathan Stockman and Brian Level, January–December 2017)
- Amazing Spider-Man: Venom Inc. Alpha (one-shot, February 2018)
- Amazing Spider-Man: Venom Inc. Omega (one-shot, March 2018)
- Invincible Iron Man vol. 1 #598: "Where Is Wolverine?" (back-up story, May 2018)
- X-Men: Red #2: "Where Is Wolverine?" (back-up story, May, 2018)
- Venom vol. 4 #1–6, 9-11, 25, 35 (July 2018–June 2021)
- Web of Venom: Unleashed (writer, one-shot, with Kyle Hotz, March 2019)
- Free Comic Book Day: Spider-Man/Venom (July 2019–September 2020)
- Absolute Carnage #1–5 (October 2019–January 2020)
- Incoming!: "45–48" (one-shot, February 2020)
- King in Black #1–5 (February 2021–May 2021)
- Carnage: Black, White & Blood #4: Carnage Beyond (writer, w/ Joe Bennett, July 2021)
- Amazing Fantasy #1000: "Spider-Man vs. Conspiriton" (one-shot, August 2022)
- Miracleman #0: "Blood on the Snow" (writer/artist, co-feature, one-shot, October 2022)
- The Amazing Spider-Man Vol. 6 #14 (co-artist w/ Michael Dowling, Kyle Hotz & Terry Dodson, November 2022)
- Marvel Age #1000: "Sunday Dinner" (writer/artist, co-feature, one-shot, August 2023)
- Superior Spider-Man Returns (co-artist w/ Mark Bagley, Humberto Ramos & Giuseppe Camuncoli, one-shot, October 2023)
- Free Comic Book Day: Ultimate Universe/Spider-Man #1 (co-feature, one-shot, May 2024)
- X-Men vol. 7 #1– (artist, July 2024–Present)

==== Other publishers ====
- AM-Markosi
  - Midnight Kiss #0–5 (August 2005–May 2006)
- Wagon Wheel Comics
  - Teddy and the Yeti #1 (December 2009)
- Image Comics
  - Vanish #1–8 (artist on #1–6, co-writer on #3–8 w/ Donny Cates, co-artist on #6–8 w/ Netho Diaz and V Ken Marion, September 2022–June 2023)
  - The Schlub #1–6 (co-writer w/ Kenny Porter, w/ Tyrell Cannon, August 2023–January 2024)
- DSTLRY
  - The Missionary #1–3 (writer, w/ Tyrell Cannon, 2024)

=== Cover work ===
Image Comics

- Rasputin #1 (October 2014)
- God Hates Astronauts #9 (June 2015)
- Citizen Jack #6 (May 2016)
- Curse Words #6 (July 2017)
- Undiscovered Country #8 (September 2020)
- Crossover #1 (November 2020)
- Nocterra #7 (February 2022)
- Crossover 3D Special (August 2022)
- Vanish #1–8 (September 2022–June 2023
- The Schlub #1–6 (August 2023–January 2024)
- Kill Your Darlings #1–8 (September 2023–April 2024)

==== Marvel Comics ====
- Fear Itself: Deadpool #1–3 (August–October 2011)
- Deadpool vol. 2 #49–49.1 (March 2012)
- FF vol. 1: #22 (November 2012)
- Scarlet Spider vol. 2 #1–25 (March 2012–February 2014)
- Fantastic Four vol. 1 #609–611 (October–December 2012)
- Superior Spider-Man vol. 1 #1–3, 9, 17–19, 26 (March 2013–March 2014)
- Infinity #4 (December 2013)
- Wolverine vol. 6 #1–7 (April–July 2014)
- She-Hulk vol. 3 #1 (April 2014)
- Avengers World #9 (September 2014)
- Inhuman #4–14, Annual (October 2014–July 2015)
- Uncanny Avengers vol. 3 #1–4, 7–8, 10–14, 23 (December 2015–July 2017)
- Amazing Spider-Man & Silk: The Spider(fly) Effect #4 (August 2016)
- Uncanny Inhumans #12–14 (October–December 2016)
- Amazing Spider-Man: Renew Your Vows #1–9, 11–16, 18, 20 (January 2017–August 2018)
- Secret Empire: United (August 2017)
- Amazing Spider-Man: Venom Inc. Alpha (February 2018)
- Amazing Spider-Man vol. 1 #792 (February 2018)
- Amazing Spider-Man: Venom Inc. Omega (March 2018)
- New Mutants: Dead Souls #1–6 (May–October 2018)
- Venom vol. 1 #164–165 (June 2018)
- X-Men: Gold vol. 2 #25 (June 2018)
- Venom vol. 4 #1–13, 25–35 (July 2018-June 2021)
- Web of Venom: Ve'Nam (one-shot, October 2018)
- Web of Venom: Unleashed (one-shot, March 2019)
- Amazing Spider-Man vol. 5 #25 (July 2019)
- Free Comic Book Day Spider-Man/Venom (July 2019–September 2020)
- Wolverine: Exit Wounds (August 2019)
- Absolute Carnage #1–5 (October 2019–January 2020)
- Scream: Curse of Carnage #4–5 (April–May 2020)
- Thor vol. 6 #4 (May 2020)
- Fantastic Four: Antithesis #1 (October 2020)
- Power Pack vol. 4 #1 (January 2021)
- King in Black 1–5 (February–April 2021)
- Ghost Rider: Return of Vengeance #1 (one-shot, February 2021)
- Maestro: War and Pax #1 (March 2021)
- Daredevil vol. 6 #26 (January 2021)
- Beta Ray Bill #1 (March 2021)
- Giant-Size Amazing Spider-Man: Chameleon Conspiracy #1 (June 2021)
- Carnage: Black, White & Blood #4 (July 2021)
- Wolverine vol. 7 #14, 21, 29, 36, 48 (July 2021–April 2024)
- Deadpool: Black, White & Blood #1 (August 2021)
- Kang the Conqueror #1 (August 2021)
- Dark Ages #1–6 (September 2021–March 2022)
- The Immortal Hulk #50 (October 2021)
- Thor vol. 6 #18, 23 (October 2021–March 2022)
- Hulk vol. 5 #1, 6 (November 2021–April 2022)
- Star Wars: Darth Vader #19–20 (December 2021–February 2022)
- X Lives of Wolverine #2 (February 2022)
- X Deaths of Wolverine #2, 5 (February–March 2022)
- Sabretooth vol. 4 #1–5 (February–July 2022)
- Ghost Rider vol. 10 #1, 11, 17 (February 2022–August 2023)
- Strange Academy vol. 1 #16–18 (February–July 2022)
- Hulk Vs. Thor: Banner of War Alpha #1 (May 2022)
- Spider-Man 2099: Exodus #1–5 (May–August 2022)
- Jane Foster & the Mighty Thor #1–5 (June–October 2022)
- Moon Knight: Black, White & Blood #2 (June 2022)
- Daredevil vol. 7 #1 (July 2022)
- Venom vol. 5 #9, 12, 14, 22–24, 32 (July 2022–April 2024)
- Avengers: 1,000,000 B.C. #1 (August 2022)
- Star Wars: The Mandalorian #3 (September (2022)
- Spider-Man Vol 4 #1 (October 2022)
- All-Out Avengers #2 (October 2022)
- Crypt of Shadows vol. 3 #1 (October 2022)
- Amazing Spider-Man vol. 6 #13, 16, 18, 41 (November 2022–January 2024)
- Black Panther: Unconquered #1 (November 2022)
- Sabretooth & the Exiles #1–5 (November 2022–March 2023)
- Dark Web #1 (December 2022)
- Dark Web: X-Men #1 (December 2022)
- Bloodline: Daughter of Blade #1 (February 2023)
- Miles Morales: Spider-Man vol. 2 #3 (February–March 2023)
- Cosmic Ghost Rider vol. 2 #1 (March 2023)
- Hellcat vol. 2 #1 (March 2023)
- Red Goblin #2, 6 (March–July 2023)
- Carnage vol. 3 #12–14 (April–June 2023)
- Carnage Reigns Alpha #1 (May 2023)
- Cult of Carnage: Misery #1 (May 2023)
- Extreme Venomverse #1–5 (May–July 2023)
- Doctor Strange vol. 6 #3 (May 2023)
- Carnage Reigns Omega #1 (June 2023)
- Death of the Venomverse #1–5 (August–September 2023)
- Ghost Rider/Wolverine: Weapons of Vengeance Alpha #1 (August 2023)
- Marvel Age #1000 (August 2023)
- Ghost Rider/Wolverine: Weapons of Vengeance Omega #1 (September 2023)
- Uncanny Avengers vol. 4 #2 (September 2023)
- Superior Spider-Man Returns #1 (October 2023)
- Marvel Super Heroes Secret Wars: Battleworld #1 (November 2023)
- Original X-Men #1 (December 2023)
- Ultimate Spider-Man vol. 3 #1 (January 2024)
- Alien: Black, White & Blood #1 (February 2024)
- Deadpool vol 10 #1 (April 2024)
- Free Comic Book Day: Ultimate Universe/Spider-Man #1 (May 2024)

==== Other publishers ====
- AAM-Markosia
  - Scatterbrain #1 (March 2005)
  - Abiding Perdition #6 (January 2006)
- BOOM! Studios
  - Warhammer: Crown of Destruction #3 (December 2008)
- ComixTribe
  - And Then Emily Was Gone #0 (May 2015)
- Devil's Due Publishing
  - Hack/Slash: The Series #31 (February 2010)
- Dream Key Comics
  - Deathshroud #1 (February 2021)
- DSTLRY
  - White Boat #1 (March 2024)
- Harris Comics
  - Vampirella: The Second Coming #3 (November 2009)
- Indiegogo
  - Deathshroud #1 (February 2021)
- Titan
  - Man Plus #1 (January 2016)
- Valiant Entertainment
  - Bloodshot U.S.A. #1 (October 2016)
- Zenescope Entertainment
  - Grimm Fairy Tales #27-28, 35-36 (May 2008–March 2009)
  - Beyond Wonderland #3–4 (October–December 2008)
  - 1001 Arabian Nights: The Adventures of Sinbad #7 (January 2009)
  - Escape from Wonderland #2 (October 2009)

=== Others ===
- Venom: The Last Dance (2024) Creative consultant
