= Sleeper (Marvel Comics) =

Marvel Comics fictional character

Sleeper is the name of several characters appearing in American comic books published by Marvel Comics. The first Sleeper is the name of a series of five destructive robots created by the Red Skull. The second Sleeper is a Symbiote.

== Publication history ==
The first Sleeper first appeared in Tales of Suspense #72 and was created by Stan Lee and Jack Kirby.

The second Sleeper was created by writer Mike Costa and artist Mark Bagley and first appeared in Venom #165, while making its first named appearance in Venom: First Host #3.

== Fictional character biography ==
=== Robots ===
Sleeper

Publication information
- Publisher: Marvel Comics
- First appearance: Tales of Suspense #72 (December 1965)
- Created by: Stan Lee (writer); Jack Kirby (artist)

In-story information
- Species: Robot
- Notable aliases: SL-4, the Fourth Sleeper

The Sleepers are five doomsday robots designed in Berlin by Nazi Germany as agents of destruction. After World War II, the Fourth Sleeper is entombed within an underwater crypt. The first three robots are activated by agents and sent to attack Europe. They consist of a giant human-like robot with blaster rays, a winged robot, and the 'brain', which resembles Red Skull and acts as a powerful bomb. Despite Captain America's attempts to stop them, the Sleepers combine and fly towards the North Pole. While pursuing the Sleepers, Captain America deduces that they intend to destroy Earth by digging into its core and detonating. To prevent this, Captain America boards the Sleeper in midair and detonates the bomb early, destroying the three Sleepers. The fourth and fifth sleepers are activated separately following the destruction of the first three, but are stopped by Captain America.

=== Symbiote ===
The Sleeper symbiote is the child of the Venom symbiote, who intended to care for it after being cleansed by the Klyntar. After learning that it is pregnant with Sleeper, Venom keeps its existence secret from Eddie Brock until they are captured by the Symbiote Task Force, led by Claire Dixonbe and Mac Gargan. Spider-Woman rescues Eddie and Venom, who travel to Alchemax so Venom can give birth. Eddie and Venom entrust Liz Allan to take care of the symbiote.

Sleeper is nurtured and raised by Venom, who regularly visits Alchemax and aims to prevent it from becoming evil. After Venom is taken away by its original host, the Kree soldier Tel-Kar, Sleeper bonds with Eddie Brock and allies with the Warbride Skrull, M'Lanz, to save Venom and prevent Tel-Kar from using a deadly Skrull bioweapon. During the ensuing fight, Tel-Kar is wounded after being caught in an explosion at the Skrull research base. Tel-Kar survives and plans to activate the bioweapon, but is stopped by Sleeper, who lobotomizes him and possesses his body to explore the universe. Following the events of "Queen in Black", Sleeper becomes the King in Black, succeeding Knull.

== Powers and abilities ==
The Fourth Sleeper's robotic materials, design, and construction provide it with superhuman physical abilities and limited artificial intelligence. It additionally has optic lasers and could formerly become intangible and generate thermal energy.

The Sleeper symbiote has all of the powers of the predecessor's first human host Spider-Man. It also possesses shapeshifting abilities, which it has used to assume a cat-like form. In addition, it is undetectable by Spider-Man's spider-sense and can generate chemicals.

== In other media ==
=== Television ===
- The original Sleeper robots appear in the "Captain America" segment of The Marvel Super Heroes.
- A Sleeper robot appears in the X-Men: The Animated Series episode "Old Soldiers".
- Robots similar to the Sleepers appears in the Spider-Man episode "Six Forgotten Warriors". They were created to protect the Red Skull's "doomsday weapon".
- Multiple Sleeper robots appear in The Avengers: Earth's Mightiest Heroes episode "Winter Soldier".
- A Sleeper robot appears in the Avengers Assemble episode "The Sleeper Awakens". This version is powered by the Red Skull's A.I. system, Skull-Net.
- A variation of the Sleeper robots known as Sleeper-Mechs appear in the fifth season of Agents of S.H.I.E.L.D., serving as shock troopers for General Hale.

=== Video games ===
The Sleeper robot appears as the final boss of Captain America: Super Soldier. This version is a giant automaton of unknown origin that was discovered during the Middle Ages by Heller Zemo. Centuries later, during World War II, Zemo's descendant Heinrich Zemo joins forces with Hydra to activate the Sleeper, only to be betrayed by them. Despite succeeding, Captain America destroys it.
