= Knull =

Marvel Comics supervillain

- Knull as featured on a variant cover from Venom (Vol. 4) #5 (August 22, 2018); Art by Skan Srisuwan

Publication information
- Publisher: Marvel Comics
- First appearance: Thor: God of Thunder #6; (March 2013; identity unrevealed); Venom vol. 4 #3; (August 2018; full appearance)
- Created by: Donny Cates; Ryan Stegman

In-story information
- Species: Elder God
- Place of origin: Primordial void
- Team affiliations: Symbiote Imperium
- Notable aliases: God of the Symbiotes; God of the Void; God of the darkness; Lord of the Abyss; God-Host; Grendel (avatar); Exolon God; King in Black; Slicer of Worlds
- Abilities: Superhuman strength, speed, and durability; Matter generation and manipulation; Shadow manipulation; Symbiote domination; Symbiote creation; Healing factor; Shapeshifting; Immortality; Flight; Skilled hand-to-hand combatant

Knull (/nʌl/) is a supervillain appearing in American comic books published by Marvel Comics. Created by writer Donny Cates and artist Ryan Stegman, the character debuted in Venom vol. 4 #3 (August 2018), and later retroactively established as the unnamed black-armored figure in Jason Aaron's Thor: God of Thunder #6 (March 2013). Knull is a primordial god of darkness from before the universe's seventh iteration. He created the symbiote race and the weapon All-Black the Necrosword, and he rules the symbiotes as the King in Black. His introduction altered the established fictional history of the Klyntar, Venom, and Carnage.

Knull was developed gradually across Cates and Stegman's Venom run (2018–2021), first appearing in flashback before escalating to the central antagonist of the "Absolute Carnage" crossover event (2019) and then the main villain of the company-wide "King in Black" event (2020–2021). In that event, he invades Earth with a fleet of symbiote dragons, kills Sentry, and seals the planet in a symbiote sphere that cuts it off from sunlight, before being defeated and killed by Venom, who absorbs his role as King in Black. Following the Venom War storyline (2024), Knull was resurrected in a 2026 self-titled solo series, written by Al Ewing and Tom Waltz.

Knull has been described as one of Marvel's most powerful supervillains. His creation drew widespread critical attention as a meaningful reinvention of the symbiote mythos. Knull made his live-action feature film debut in the Sony's Spider-Man Universe (SSU) film Venom: The Last Dance, portrayed by Andy Serkis.

== Publication history ==
The character was first introduced in Venom vol. 4 #3 (Aug 2018), giving a nod to a nameless being appearing in Thor: God of Thunder #6. The character would be mentioned in various issues of Web of Venom, Guardians of the Galaxy and "War of the Realms". After that, Knull was the main antagonist in Donny Cates' Silver Surfer: Black.

Knull returned in King in Black as the main antagonist, which centers on his attack on Earth with his symbiote army. Knull was killed off at the end of King in Black, but returned in a self-titled series in 2025. The series is written by Al Ewing and Tom Waltz, with art by Juanan Ramirez. The series saw Knull gain power over light after Hela drains his powers.

== Fictional character biography ==
=== Origin ===
Knull is a primordial deity who came into being following the destruction of the sixth iteration of the cosmos. He was originally content to drift through "the endless void" until the Celestials arrived and began creating the seventh iteration of the cosmos — from which sprang the current Marvel Universe.

The Celestials offered Knull the position of "King in Black" and the responsibility of ensuring stability in their new universe. Upon realizing that the Celestials' light was slowly despoiling his kingdom of darkness and that he would be nothing more than a servant in the new universe, Knull retaliated by creating the first symbiote: All-Black, who takes the form of a sword. Using All-Black, Knull decapitated the Celestial tasked with monitoring him. Knull created a symbiote armor and, with All-Black, began killing deities until he crash-landed on an unnamed planet, where Gorr took All-Black from the incapacitated Knull.

When Thor defeated the symbiote dragon Grendel, Knull lost control of his symbiotes. The symbiotes scattered over the universe, now free from Knull's control, began bonding to benevolent hosts and learning about the Light. The symbiotes rebelled against Knull and trapped him inside an artificial planet formed from billions of symbiotes, which they called Klyntar—"cage" in their language.

=== Conquering Earth and death ===
After escaping Klyntar, Knull unleashes symbiote dragons on Earth as the Avengers, the Fantastic Four, and the X-Men fight them. Sentry takes Knull into Earth's orbit, intending to kill him, but Knull kills Sentry and assimilates the Void. Knull has his symbiote dragons form a sphere around Earth to cut it off from the Sun.

Knull plans to control Dylan Brock, Eddie Brock's son, who possesses the symbiote codex, but Dylan fights back. Namor, Thor and Storm deal heavy damage while Jean Grey's psychic powers immobilize Knull, seeing Knull's past and realizing that the God of Light (the Enigma Force) is the one thing that can take down Knull. Eddie Brock claims the Enigma Force, becoming Captain Universe.

Venom manages to make use of Mjolnir and Silver Surfer's surfboard, fusing them into a battle axe resembling Venom's spider emblem. Using his axe, Venom defeats the symbiote dragons, noting that Knull has become afraid of him. Venom picks up Knull, flies into the air, and punches through the symbiote barrier surrounding Earth, where he uses the Uni-Power to vaporize Knull. Following Knull's death, Eddie Brock succeeds him as King in Black, gaining control over the symbiotes.

=== Return ===
Eddie Brock lost his position as King in Black during the Venom War storyline, creating a cosmic vacancy. Knull is resurrected to fill this vacancy, but is left in a weakened state. Hela captures Knull and takes most of his power, becoming the Queen in Black. With his powers drained, Knull gains control of the Lightforce, which he uses in a similar manner to his original powers. Knull later overcomes Hela and takes back his original powers while retaining his power over light. Soon afterward, Knull is defeated and killed by the Venom symbiote and its hosts. Knull returns to life and attempts to retake his throne, but the Sleeper symbiote usurps his position as King in Black, causing Knull to die once more.

== Powers and abilities ==
Knull possesses superhuman strength and durability. He is depicted as an immortal being. He is able to generate and manipulate eldritch darkness, as he can manifest darkness to create weapons and living creatures, whom he calls the "Living abyss." He is able to forge different types of symbiotes with various abilities, such as dragon-like symbiotes.

Knull is an expert combatant, using All-Black to kill Celestials and other gods, while wearing an armor made from symbiote-matter. Knull's armor is decorated with a red dragon and spiral emblem, which was based on Spiral of Carcosa from True Detective.

== Reception ==
=== Critical reception ===
Ian Cardona of CBR.com referred to Knull as a "cross between Marvel's Dracula and the main villain behind Spider-Verse, Morlun", writing, "There is an ethereal, wraith-like quality to his demeanor. He's got the appropriately haunting build, with his broad shoulders and chest covered by armor that makes him appear both regal and powerful. He has terrifyingly sharp teeth, and the signature symbiote tongue." Bradley Prom of Screen Rant called Knull one of Marvel's "memorable antagonists", saying, "It took all of Earth's heroes, along with intergalactic heroes such as the Guardians of the Galaxy and the Kree-Skrull alliance to finally stop him. However, before they all teamed up, Knull beat Silver Surfer, the Avengers, the X-Men, and more, forcing the ultimate team-up to stop one of the most powerful Marvel Comics villains in history."

Knull received particular attention in Sweden and Norway, due to the word knull being the noun form of "fuck" (referring to copulation), in Swedish and Norwegian.

=== Accolades ===
Various online articles have assessed Knull as among the most powerful villains in Marvel Comics, and among the most powerful symbiotes. In 2020, CBR.com included Knull in their "Spider-Man: The Best New Villains of the Century" list. In 2022, Screen Rant included Knull in their "Marvel Comics: 13 Most Powerful Symbiotes" list, in their "10 Best Cosmic Villains Not Yet in the MCU" list, and in their "10 Marvel Comics Gods Who Should Join The MCU Next" list.

== In other media ==
=== Television ===
Knull appears in the Spider-Man promo "The Secret History of Venom", voiced by Ben Pronsky. This version created the Klyntar to serve as living weapons against the Celestials. He eventually abandoned the Klyntar after deeming his first creations, the Symbiote Sisters, useless to him.

=== Film ===
Knull appears in Venom: The Last Dance, portrayed by Andy Serkis.

=== Video games ===
- Knull and Ancient Venom (Venom possessed by Knull) appear as playable characters in Spider-Man Unlimited.
- Knull appears as a playable character and boss in Marvel: Future Fight.
- Knull appears in Marvel Snap.
- Knull appears as a playable character in Marvel Contest of Champions.
- Knull appears as a playable character in Marvel Puzzle Quest.
- Knull appears as a boss and playable character in Marvel Strike Force.
- Knull appears as an NPC in Marvel Rivals, voiced by Michael Scott.
- Knull appears in Marvel Cosmic Invasion, voiced by Isaac C. Singleton Jr.
