= Wraith (Yuri Watanabe) =

Marvel Comics character

- Wraith as depicted in The Superior Spider-Man #16 (August 2013). Art by Humberto Ramos (penciller), Victor Olazaba (inker), and Edgar Delgado (colorist).

Publication information
- Publisher: Marvel Comics
- First appearance: As Yuri Watanabe: The Amazing Spider-Man #600 (July 2009); As Wraith: The Amazing Spider-Man #663 (June 2011)
- Created by: Dan Slott (writer); John Romita Jr. (artist)

In-story information
- Alter ego: Yuriko "Yuri" Watanabe
- Species: Human
- Partnerships: Spider-Man
- Abilities: Trained police officer Fear gas Access to Chameleon and Mysterio's tech Yellow elastic straps that can cling onto objects and wrap enemies

Wraith (Yuriko "Yuri" Watanabe) is a character appearing in American comic books published by Marvel Comics, typically in stories featuring the superhero Spider-Man. She was created as a successor to Jean DeWolff, a police detective and member of Spider-Man's supporting cast who was killed in the 1985 storyline "The Death of Jean DeWolff".

Yuri is introduced as a captain in the New York City Police Department and former protégé of DeWolff who idolizes Spider-Man and occasionally works with him to fight crime. Her disillusionment with the justice system eventually prompts her to lead a double life as the vigilante Wraith, creating a costume that imitates Spider-Man's powers, in addition to utilizing various tools confiscated from supervillains. As the Wraith, Yuri would wage war on New York's criminals outside the confines of the law and, even though her methods have sometimes proven too extreme for Spider-Man's liking, the two have resumed their partnership several times.

The character has been adapted from the comics into other forms of media, most notably the Marvel's Spider-Man series of video games, in which she is voiced by Tara Platt.

== Publication history ==
Yuri Watanabe first appeared in The Amazing Spider-Man #600 (July 2009) and was created by Dan Slott and John Romita Jr. She first appeared as Wraith in The Amazing Spider-Man #663 (June 2011).

== Fictional character biography ==
Yuri Watanabe was a captain in the New York City Police Department (NYPD), mentored by the late Jean DeWolff. Like DeWolff, she secretly aided Spider-Man. Her fascination with the hero began to affect her mentally, however, as she became increasingly bitter over the limitations of the justice system and the ability of rich and well-connected criminals to escape punishment.

Shortly thereafter, a new vigilante, the Wraith (an identity originally taken by Jean's brother Brian DeWolff), starts targeting Mister Negative's criminal syndicate. During one such attack, the Wraith unmasks to reveal DeWolff's face, although this is later revealed to be one of the Chameleon's masks stolen from police evidence. It is later revealed that the Wraith is Yuri pretending to be DeWolff's ghost to scare the criminals of New York, using a costume in imitation of Spider-Man to achieve the results she sought.

Wraith later accompanies forensic expert Carlie Cooper on a visit to Grand Tauró, where they pursue underworld financier Antoine Morant, searching for information on the secret bank account of the Superior Spider-Man (Otto Octavius's mind in Spider-Man's body). Carlie and the Wraith catch up with Morant shredding some documents out of fear. Carlie recovers one of the documents, discovering that all of the Superior Spider-Man's equipment and technology for the Arachnauts, as well as the order for Spiderlings, are being paid for using the secret account, putting Carlie one step closer to finding the evidence needed to prove the new Spider-Man's true identity.

After Carlie is kidnapped by the original Goblin King (Norman Osborn), Yuri investigates Octavius hoping to find Carlie's whereabouts. She confronts Octavius during the Goblin Nation's attack for info on Carlie but is knocked out by the transformed Carlie. She then aids the Avengers and their ally Cardiac against the Goblin Knight with assistance from Peter Parker who eventually regains his place as Spider-Man from Octavius.

In the "Spiral" storyline, Yuri's faith in the justice system is shattered when crime boss Tombstone is released from prison after gunning down one of her friends during a shootout with the police. She receives photographic evidence from Mister Negative that Judge Howell, who signed off on Tombstone's release, received a favor in return and arrests the judge without contacting the NYPD after obtaining more evidence as the Wraith with Spider-Man. She continues to receive tips from Negative on where big crime lords such as Hammerhead and the second Goblin King (Phil Urich) are meeting so she and Spider-Man can take them down.

Spider-Man notices Yuri is being more brutal in her approach and believes Mister Negative is using her. This is later proven right when Negative begins to take over the territories of his incarcerated rivals and tries to frame the Wraith as a murderer. When Howell dies in prison from a stab wound, Yuri's superior confiscates her badge and she is dismissed from the force. After a fight with the Circus of Crime, she realizes she has been playing into Negative's hands and kills one of his men, declaring that "Watanabe the cop" no longer exists and that only the Wraith is left. When she attempts to kill Negative, Spider-Man tries to convince her to change her ways. She decides that killing criminals rather than arresting them is more fulfilling and attacks her former ally, but Spider-Man knocks her out and goes on to defeat Negative himself. Spider-Man later finds Yuri has abandoned her costume, but kept her Wraith mask.

== Powers and abilities ==
The Wraith primarily uses technology obtained by the police from various Spider-Man villains, including a mask of Jean DeWolff's face from the Chameleon to hide her true identity, equipment designed by Mysterio, and Mister Fear's fear gas. Her primary weapons are elastic straps attached to her costume that wrap up her enemies and allow her to swing around the city similar to Spider-Man.

== Reception ==
In 2021, Screen Rant included Wraith in their "Spider-Man: 10 Best Female Villains" list.

== In other media ==
=== Television ===
Yuri Watanabe appears in Spider-Man (2017), voiced by Sumalee Montano. This version is the NYPD's Chief of Police.

=== Film ===
An alternate reality version of Yuri Watanabe from Earth-65 appears in Spider-Man: Across the Spider-Verse, voiced by Atsuko Okatsuka. This version is a member of George Stacy's anti-Spider-Woman task force.

=== Video games ===
- Yuri Watanabe / Wraith appears as a playable character in Spider-Man Unlimited.
- Yuri Watanabe appears in Insomniac Games' Spider-Man series, voiced by Tara Platt. This version is a composite of her traditional incarnation and Jean DeWolff, having worked with Spider-Man for several years.
  - Introduced in Spider-Man (2018), Yuri's father was imprisoned for taking bribes from Hammerhead, leading her to dedicate her career to bringing him down. Throughout the base game, Yuri assists Spider-Man in apprehending a variety of villains, including the Kingpin, Shocker, and the Sinister Six. In The City That Never Sleeps, Yuri embarks on a violent quest for revenge against Hammerhead after he repeatedly humiliates her attempts to bring him to justice. Following a failed attempt to kill Hammerhead, Yuri is put on administrative leave and quits the NYPD. She goes into hiding after killing one of Hammerhead's men, telling Spider-Man that she intends to punish criminals the law won't.
  - Yuri appears as a boss in Spider-Man 2. As of this game, she has become Wraith and taken to killing criminals while hunting cult leader Cletus Kasady, utilizing a kusarigama instead of elastic straps. Throughout their search and fight with Kasady, Spider-Man and Yuri form a begrudging partnership. After Kasady derails a train in an attempt to steal a symbiote, Yuri allows him to escape in order to rescue Spider-Man. Spider-Man decides not to turn Yuri in, and she vows to track Kasady down. She also appears as an ally that can help stop crimes in the open world. Upon completing Yuri's side mission, a suit called "Saving Lives" is unlocked for Spider-Man, which is based on her Wraith costume.
