= The Death of Jean DeWolff =

1985–86 Spider-Man comics story arc

- Cover of Peter Parker, the Spectacular Spider-Man vol. 110, Jan 1986; Featuring Spider-Man fighting Daredevil, art by Rich Buckler
- Publisher: Marvel Comics
- Publication date: October 1985 – January 1986
- Genre: Superhero
- Title(s): Peter Parker, the Spectacular Spider-Man #107–110
- Main character(s): Spider-Man; Jean DeWolff; Daredevil; Sin-Eater

Creative team
- Writer: Peter David
- Penciller: Rich Buckler
- Inker(s): Kyle Baker; Brett Breeding; Pat Redding; Josef Rubinstein
- Letterer(s): Phil Hugh Felix; Rick Parker
- Colorist(s): George Roussos; Bob Sharen; Nelson Yomtov
- The Death of Jean DeWolff: ISBN 0-87135-704-6

"The Death of Jean DeWolff" is a four-part story arc featuring the popular Marvel Comics superhero Spider-Man. It comprises the comics Peter Parker, the Spectacular Spider-Man #107–110 (October 1985 – January 1986). The story was written by Peter David, penciled by Rich Buckler, and inked by Brett Breeding, Josef Rubinstein, Kyle Baker and Pat Redding. It was the second professional comic book writing assignment for David and the beginning of his "break" into comic book writing.

In this arc, Peter Parker (Spider-Man) hunts down the killer of police captain Jean DeWolff, one of his closest friends.

== Publication history ==
On the first page of "Part 4: All My Sins Remembered", when Spider-Man remembers his teenage past with Betty Brant, the flashback panels are reprints of panels from earlier issues of The Amazing Spider-Man; e.g. the third panel is from The Amazing Spider-Man #41.

== Plot summary ==
After capturing a trio of muggers assaulting Ernie Popchik (an elderly tenant of his Aunt May's), Spider-Man learns that his close friend NYPD captain Jean DeWolff has been killed in her sleep. Spider-Man confronts the police officer in charge of the investigation, Sergeant Stan Carter. Carter tells him Jean was killed by a close-range double-barreled shotgun blast, and that her badge is missing.

Meanwhile, attorney Matt Murdock (the civilian identity of Daredevil) is assigned to represent Popchik's muggers at their arraignment; he succeeds in getting them released without bail, and through his super-senses also finds out Spider-Man's secret identity as Peter Parker when the latter attends the trial in May's and Popchik's company. However, he is disgusted by his clients' rowdy behavior, and speaks with the judge presiding over the case — his friend and mentor, Horace Rosenthal — about his misgivings with doing pro bono publico work. During their talk he senses an armed and masked intruder in Rosenthal's chamber. After Rosenthal leaves, the intruder introduces himself as the Sin-Eater and tries to shoot Murdock. Hearing the commotion, Rosenthal returns and is shot by the Sin-Eater. The Sin-Eater then escapes through the window.

On the streets outside, Spider-Man responds to the panic aroused by the Sin-Eater's appearance. He opens fire on Spider-Man, who leaps above the scattergun blasts. The bullets hit a crowd of bystanders. During their fight, Spider-Man spots a gavel and a badge on the Sin-Eater's belt, and realizes he must be the one who killed Jean DeWolff. However, when he sees Aunt May lying senseless on the ground, he allows the Sin-Eater to escape so that he can help her.

Spider-Man successfully petitions Carter for unofficial approval to search DeWolff's apartment. Carter also reveals the folklore behind the term sin-eater, and mentions that he is a former S.H.I.E.L.D. agent. Spider-Man is unable to find any clues in DeWolff's apartment, but discovers a collection of news clippings indicating that she was romantically interested in him. While at Rosenthal's funeral, Murdock recognizes Sin-Eater's heartbeat among those attending DeWolff's funeral nearby, but there are too many mourners for him to pick out which one is the Sin-Eater. Later that night, the Sin-Eater approaches the priest who officiated Jean's funeral, Father Bernard Finn, and shoots him.

A media circus breaks out in the city over the Sin-Eater murders, with an opportunistic community leader, Reverend Jackson Tulliver, feeding the flames of public discontent. Spider-Man learns that one of the bystanders hit by the bullets he dodged died from his wounds; Carter assuages Spider-Man's guilt over this. Daredevil and Spider-Man separately comb the underworld, but are unable to find anyone with knowledge of the Sin-Eater.

The Sin-Eater enters the Daily Bugle building, demanding to see J. Jonah Jameson (who is actually on vacation). Bugle editor-in-chief Joe Robertson acts as a decoy, and Parker throws a typewriter roller, knocking the Sin-Eater out. The Sin-Eater is identified as Emil Gregg. Gregg has no memory of committing the murders, but claims that voices ordered each one the night before. Convinced that he couldn't resist the voices, he instead went on his mission to kill Jameson early, in the hope that things would then go wrong and he would be caught. However, Daredevil arrives to hear Gregg's confession, and does not recognize Gregg's heartbeat as that of the Sin-Eater he encountered before.

Daredevil tells Spider-Man that Emil Gregg must be a copycat. Spider-Man is skeptical, since Gregg has a history of mental instability and knows details of the murders that weren't released to the public, so Daredevil takes him to Gregg's apartment in hope of finding some proof of his innocence. Once there, Daredevil finds the door to the next apartment has been recently jimmied. Some unopened mail reveals the apartment is Stan Carter's, and Daredevil opens a closet to find shotguns, Sin-Eater costumes, and a tape recorder. He deduces that Gregg's "voices in the night" were actually Carter recording his war journal next door. He also notes that there are two empty gun holsters; Gregg broke into Carter's apartment to take one shotgun, but the other must have been taken by Carter to kill Jameson. Spider-Man realizes Carter is headed to the Jameson house and will most likely kill the only two people there: Jonah's wife Marla and secretary Betty Leeds, who is also the first person Spider-Man fell in love with. He calls the Bugle building and gets the house number from Robertson, then calls there. The phone picks up and he briefly hears Betty's voice, but as he tries to warn her, the only further response he receives is the sound of a shotgun being fired.

Spider-Man races to the Jameson house to avenge Betty. When he arrives, however, he finds that Betty is alive, having fended off the Sin-Eater for the past few minutes. Spider-Man defeats Carter and begins beating him mercilessly, not stopping even after he loses consciousness. Daredevil arrives and pulls him away. Spider-Man refuses to back off, and the two superheroes fight. Daredevil taunts Spider-Man, using his enraged emotional state against him, and finally knocks him unconscious.

Stan Carter is brought to jail, and the news that the Sin-Eater was a policeman shocks the city. Mr. Popchik "snaps" at the news and takes his World War II service pistol into the city, determined to prove he is not defenseless. While riding a New York City Subway train, he is threatened by three teenage muggers. He pulls his gun and shoots them, leaving them wounded, and then turns himself in. The police are informed by agents of S.H.I.E.L.D. that Carter was a subject of experiments with modifications of PCP; the experiments greatly increased the subject's physical attributes, but also drove them insane. Plans to transfer Carter to the prison on Riker's Island leak to the press, and an angry mob besieges the police station. With some riot-geared officers working up a distraction, the police try to board Carter onto a truck, but the mob, led by Jean DeWolff's stepfather, forces itself onto the police, threatening to lynch Carter. Daredevil throws himself in between, but is overwhelmed by the mob. When Spider-Man turns his back, Daredevil cries out "Peter!". Realizing the mob will kill Daredevil if he does not intervene, Spider-Man swings both Carter and Daredevil to safety.

After the crowd is dispersed, Carter is safely loaded onto the police truck. Daredevil then reveals his own secret identity to Spider-Man, and after discussing the latter's recent disillusionment for the criminal justice system, Matt offers to arrange for a lawyer for Mr. Popchik through pro bono publico to prove his side of the argument.

== Background ==
Created by Bill Mantlo and Sal Buscema, the acerbic Jean DeWolff had been a supporting character in the Spider-Man comics since her first appearance in Marvel Team-Up #48 (August 1976), and was familiar to readers as one of Spider-Man's few allies in the police force. According to Peter David, "The Death of Jean DeWolff" came about at the behest of Jim Owsley, at that time editor of the Spider-Man books: "I was going to be started on Spectacular Spider-Man and editor Jim Oswley wanted to shake up Spider-Man and the fans. He wanted to see a story in which Jean DeWolff was killed and there were all sorts of cover ups in the police department. So in answer to the second most-asked question I get at conventions, the answer is – Owsley wanted to kill her. Not me. I actually had storylines planned with her alive."

Owsley himself said, "I didn't much care for the whimsical tone of Spectacular Spider-Man, and tried to nudge writer Al Milgrom out of the seat in favor of the brilliant newcomer Peter David... I put Peter David and Rich Buckler on Spectacular, focusing on stories with a serious, "grown-up" tone and more complex themes." David combined Owsley's idea of killing off Jean DeWolff with story ideas of his own: "I wanted to do a story in which Spider-Man was confronted by a villain who committed crimes so heinous, so appalling, that Spider-Man was pushed to the edge and over. It always struck me as unrealistic how super heroes could turn fights on and off. When you're in a fistfight, adrenaline flows, your heart is thumping. If you knock the guy down and he's not getting up, most times you kick him because you're so pumped and angry. You don't back off and say "Had enough?" Usually someone has to pull you off the guy. I wanted to do that to Spider-Man because I felt it would bring some hard-edged reality to him. I also wanted to do a story underscoring the philosophical differences between Daredevil and Spider-Man... "The Death of Jean DeWolff" incorporated all three stories to varying degrees. This was accomplished when Owsley came over to my house early one evening and stayed until after midnight as we hammered out all the kinks in the story in a marathon, four-issue's-worth head-banging session."

Jim Owsley has recalled the impact of the shotgun-blast ending of Part 3 of the story, "a cliffhanger so intense, in fact, that we briefly considered pulling it. It scared the crap out of me, and I was 23. I was imagining soccer moms buying [Spectacular Spider-Man] for their kids by rote, not realizing Sin-Eater was blowing away Betty Brant Leeds inside."

Peter David revealed that the idea of the Sin-Eater came from an identically named character in the 1979 television film The Incredible Journey of Doctor Meg Laurel, as well as claiming that "virtually no readers, judging by the letters, tumbled to Stan Carter being the Sin-Eater, even though much of his dialogue fairly screamed it. I knew they wouldn't. First off, I named him Stan. Stan is a friendly name to readers after years of association with Stan Lee. Second, I made him Jewish. Isaac Asimov said if you want to have someone who evil intent must be hidden, make him Jewish and have him speak in semi-Yiddish inverted sentence order. You know. Like Yoda. ("So a murderer that makes me?") Readers will mentally categorize this as someone who is friendly and even comic relief."

David also praised the story's artist, Rich Buckler, "whose dynamic and energetic storytelling and gritty texture brought the story to pulsing life. He gave it the kind of down-and-dirty feeling that we were looking for. Kind of Spidey meets Hill Street Blues."

"Part 3: He Who is Without Sin" has a scene in which the Kingpin dictates a letter to a prospective assassin-for-hire, "Ms C.B. Kalish." This name is an in-joke in reference to Carol B. Kalish, at that time Marvel's Direct Sales Manager and Vice President of New Product Development. Kalish was a good friend of Peter David, who worked under her as a sales assistant. David credited Kalish with having made him a comics industry professional. Kalish would die five years after that issue was published, in 1991, at the age of 36.

== Reception ==
At the time of its original publication, "The Death of Jean DeWolff" was considered to be a groundbreaking comic book story. Peter David commented that "we flew in the face of standard comic book tradition by giving a character, not a noble death in battle at the climax of the story, but an inglorious death, in her sleep, at the beginning." The antagonist of the story is not a supervillain with fantastic powers, but a psychopathic vigilante with a shotgun; also, rather than presenting the bylines at the beginning of each installment, the white-on-black credits were presented in the last panel of each chapter.

"The Death of Jean DeWolff" is still considered to be one of the most popular and acclaimed Spider-Man arcs, collected by Wizard Magazine in its "Best of Spider-Man" hardcover edition. Comics Bulletin called the story an exploration of "moral relativism amongst superheroes, the flaws of the criminal justice system, and the feelings of rage and desire for vengeance", lauded the "organic and convincing" clash of values between idealist Spiderman and pragmatic Daredevil. Daredevil is seen as more mature, but also "selfish" (he kept his secret identity instead of saving the judge's life), and Spider-Man is seen as "righteous, but blinded" for doing what his conscience tells him but giving in to bloodlust. The arc was called "not perfect, but successful and dark" and was given four out of five stars.

Peter David has recalled mixed emotions about the arc: in a 1990 installment of "But I Digress", his then-weekly column in the Comics Buyer's Guide, David stated he was unnerved by the stream of fan mail demanding he bring DeWolff back, and how "Spidey Editor Jim Owsley was even told by confident fans at an Atlanta Con, "Nah, she's not really dead."" David however firmly refused to bring her back, arguing a resurrection in a comic book death-style would weaken the story. David also stated that this story established him as a writer, but he was also pigeonholed as a writer of grim and gritty stories. In 1990, David conceded that "people still tell me that "The Death of Jean DeWolff" is their favorite of my work."

Scoot Allan of Screen Rant named "The Death of Jean DeWolff" one of the "most important Spider-Man stories," saying the storyline explores how Jean DeWolff's death, one of the few law employees close to Spider-Man, impacts citizens, superheroes, and police officers from New York City. Jordan Iacobucci of Comic Book Resources called the storyline one of the "best comics" with a dark ending. Joe Garza of /Film described it as one of the best Spider-Man comic books, and called it "surprisingly layered and delves deep into such themes as revenge and the effectiveness of the criminal justice system." Benjamin Falbo of Looper hoped to see "The Death of Jean DeWolff" being approached in the Marvel Cinematic Universe, asserting, "a smaller and grittier story would be an interesting change of pace."

== Repercussions ==
=== "Mayhem!" ===
"The Death of Jean DeWolff" includes a subplot involving a thief dressed as Santa Claus. This storyline was resolved in Peter Parker, the Spectacular Spider-Man #112 (Mar. 1986); in this same issue, it is revealed that Ernie Popchik was released from jail after the grand jury refused to indict him. In "Mayhem!" (Peter Parker, the Spectacular Spider-Man #113, Apr. 1986), Mr. Popchik, hounded by the media, returns to Aunt May's boarding home. The muggers he shot at, seeking revenge, break into the home and take Mr. Popchik, Aunt May, and the other boarders hostage. Spider-Man manages to subdue three of the muggers before defeating the leader by webbing his gun. Aunt May's fiancé, Nathan Lubensky, opens the blinds, and a police sniper outside shoots and kills the leader. Aunt May is unnerved by Nathan's actions, which led to the youth being killed unnecessarily. Mr. Popchik feels guilty for causing the situation and leaves Aunt May's home.

=== "Return of the Sin-Eater" ===
Peter David brought the Sin-Eater back in The Spectacular Spider-Man #134–136 (Jan.-March 1988), drawn by Sal Buscema and inked by Vince Colletta. This storyline (informally known as "Return of the Sin-Eater") explores the origin of the Sin-Eater and his attempted rehabilitation. Set approximately one year after "The Death of Jean DeWolff", the sequel reveals that after his arrest, Carter was put in psychological and medical care. S.H.I.E.L.D. purged all the drugs from his system, but Carter still had visions of his Sin-Eater persona, as well as being unable to walk or talk properly. After his release, Carter has trouble readjusting to society, and is haunted by visions of the Sin-Eater, as well as having to deal with continuing public outrage over his crimes. Finally succumbing to his madness, Carter puts on a Sin-Eater costume, takes an unloaded shotgun, and goads the police into opening fire on him. Peter David described the conclusion of this story as a "dramatic, tragic, and perhaps, merciful ending" for Stan Carter.

=== Venom ===
The Amazing Spider-Man #300 (May 1988) reveals that Daily Globe journalist Eddie Brock wrote an exposé of the man who claimed to be the Sin-Eater, Emil Gregg. The revelation of Stan Carter being the real Sin-Eater led to Brock being fired and losing his wife. An angry Brock blames Spider-Man for the derailing of his career and life, the catalyst which resulted in his becoming the super-villain Venom. This story, written by David Michelinie, includes the retcon that Gregg's claim to be the Sin-Eater was publicly revealed via a newspaper story by Brock, instead of by Gregg's confession to the police.

== Other versions ==
=== Ultimate Marvel ===
The Ultimate Marvel version of Jean DeWolff (Jeanne DeWolfe) died in Ultimate Spider-Man Annual #2 by Brian Michael Bendis and Mark Brooks. She was shot by the Punisher (who has a similar modus operandi to the Sin-Eater, but is usually shown as a protagonist) for being corrupt.

== Collected editions ==
The storyline has been collected as a trade paperback and as a hardcover:

- The Death of Jean DeWolff (96 pages, December 1990, ISBN 0-87135-704-6). This edition contains "The Death of Jean DeWolff" from Peter Parker, the Spectacular Spider-Man #107–110, with an introduction and afterword by Peter David. Cover art by Rich Buckler.
- Marvel Premiere Classic: The Death of Jean DeWolff (168 pages, July 2011, ISBN 978-0-7851-5721-2 [regular edition], ISBN 978-0-7851-5722-9 [variant edition]). This edition contains "The Death of Jean DeWolff" from Peter Parker, the Spectacular Spider-Man #107–110, and "Return of the Sin-Eater" from The Spectacular Spider-Man #134–136, with re-colored art, and full-page reproductions of all seven issues' original covers. However, it omits Peter David's introduction and afterword from the 1990 trade paperback. Cover art by Sal Buscema and Mark Texeira (regular edition), and Rich Buckler (variant edition).

== See also ==
- The Night Gwen Stacy Died
