= Jean DeWolff =

- Captain Jean DeWolff, as depicted on the back cover of The Death of Jean DeWolff trade paperback (1990). Art by Rich Buckler.

Publication information
- Publisher: Marvel Comics
- First appearance: Marvel Team-Up #48 (August 1976)
- Created by: Bill Mantlo (writer); Sal Buscema (artist)

In-story information
- Full name: Jean DeWolff
- Team affiliations: New York City Police Department; New U Technologies
- Supporting character of: Spider-Man
- Abilities: Marksmanship; Police training

Jean DeWolff is a character appearing in American comic books published by Marvel Comics, commonly in association with the superhero Spider-Man. Created by writer Bill Mantlo and artist Sal Buscema, the character first appeared in Marvel Team-Up #48 (August 1976).

Captain Jean DeWolff is a police detective from New York City. She is portrayed as tough and unrelenting—the result of her difficult childhood and teenage years—yet morally righteous and willing to operate outside the confines of the law, such as relying on the assistance of vigilantes. DeWolff becomes a recurring ally of Spider-Man, for whom she secretly develops romantic feelings. She is also the sister of Brian DeWolff, the original Wraith. The 1985 storyline "The Death of Jean DeWolff" depicts the character's death at the hands of her partner and lover, Stanley Carter, who became the murderous vigilante Sin-Eater.

Outside of comics, the character has appeared in several media adaptations of Spider-Man, such as television series and video games. Liza Colón-Zayas portrayed Jean DeWolff in the Marvel Cinematic Universe (MCU) film Spider-Man: Brand New Day (2026).

== Publication history ==
Jean DeWolff debuted in Marvel Team-Up #48-51 (August–November 1976), and was created by Bill Mantlo and Sal Buscema. She was one of the few supporting cast members in Marvel Team-Up. DeWolff subsequently appeared in Marvel Team-Up #60-62 (August–October 1977), #65-66 (January–February 1978), #72 (August 1978), #88 (December 1979), Ms. Marvel #6-7 (June–July 1977), The Amazing Spider-Man #226 (March–April 1982), #239 (April 1983), and The Spectacular Spider-Man #103 (June 1985).

The character was killed off in the storyline "The Death of Jean DeWolff", spanning The Spectacular Spider-Man #107-110 (October 1985 – January 1986). She has since made posthumous appearances in The Sensational She-Hulk #53 (July 1993), Venom Super Special #1 (August 1995), and Spider-Man/Human Torch #4 (June 2005).

Jean DeWolff received an entry in the Official Handbook of the Marvel Universe Deluxe Edition #17, and The Official Handbook of the Marvel Universe: Spider-Man #1 (2005) and The Official Handbook of the Ultimate Marvel Universe: Fantastic Four and Spider-Man #1 (2005).

== Fictional character biography ==
=== Early history ===
Jean DeWolff's first rejection comes as a child from her harsh and disapproving father Phillip DeWolff, an officer of the NYPD, who resents having a daughter rather than another son. Her mother Celia divorces Phillip six months after Jean's birth, taking her older brother Brian DeWolff with her. Jean and Brian develop a close and loving relationship over the years despite their parents' separation. Four years after the divorce, Celia marries police patrolman Carl Weatherby, who gives Jean the love she never got from her real father. Inspired by Carl, Jean joins the police academy as an adult, but this breaks Celia's heart, as she views the police force as a source of stress and danger. It also angers her father, who is now the New York police commissioner; he dismisses Jean and other women as unfit for police duty while showering praise on Brian for joining the NYPD after graduating top of his class at the academy. Just before Jean graduates from the academy, witnesses see Brian shot in the line of duty, but the body disappears before police or rescue services arrive. Phillip retires as police commissioner soon afterward.

Driven by resentment towards her disapproving parents and fueled by anger and grief over Brian's apparent death, DeWolff grows into a tough, unrelenting police officer. She quickly rises in the ranks, becoming a detective and then a sergeant, known for her no-nonsense attitude, as well as her vintage car and preference for 1930s-style clothing. Just over two years after her father's retirement, DeWolff is promoted by his successor to the rank of captain, running Manhattan's 5th precinct.

While investigating bombings by a criminal known only as Wraith, DeWolff discovers Spider-Man and Iron Man are also looking into the matter. While many in the NYPD do not care for super-powered vigilantes, Jean openly asks Spider-Man and Iron Man for assistance, seeing the value of working with them. The two heroes, along with Doctor Strange, help DeWolff discover that Wraith is her brother Brian, who gained psychic powers and is being manipulated by his father. Doctor Strange's combination of magic and surgical skills restores Brian's mind. Phillip is sent to prison, and Jean welcomes her brother back as he rejoins the NYPD.

=== Death ===
In "The Death of Jean DeWolff" story arc, Jean DeWolff receives former S.H.I.E.L.D. agent Stanley Carter as her partner, and the two develop a close bond, eventually becoming lovers. Unbeknownst to DeWolff, Carter has an obsession with punishing criminals, which is only worsened by his experiences as a cop, to the point where he decides all "sinners" need to die. Suffering a psychotic break, Carter becomes the Sin-Eater and embarks on a killing spree, with DeWolff being among his victims.

Following DeWolff's death, Spider-Man discovers that she kept a collection of news clippings, as well as a photo of Spider-Man with Black Cat that was cut to remove the latter from the image. Spider-Man is shocked by the implication that DeWolff had unspoken feelings for him over the years. In a previous incident where Spider-Man, controlled by the Venom symbiote, attempted to kiss her, DeWolff clarified that she loved him as a friend.

Jean's death drives her family apart: Celia blames Carl for her daughter's death as Carl had inspired her to join the police force in the first place. Driven mad with grief over Sin-Eater's murder of his sister, Brian declares vengeance against the NYPD. He is later killed by the Scourge of the Underworld.

=== Post-mortem ===
Long after Jean's death, her close friend Yuri Watanabe becomes a police captain and assumes the Wraith identity after losing faith in the law's ability to punish criminals. She wears a mask of Jean's face originally created by the Chameleon under her Wraith costume, as both a means of hiding her identity and frightening criminals into believing that Wraith is Jean's vengeful spirit.

==== Jean DeWolff clone ====
A clone of Jean appears during the Dead No More: The Clone Conspiracy event. This clone, a "reanimate" who possesses all of Jean's memories, lives in a special facility called "Haven" and is created by a villain wishing to gain Spider-Man's cooperation by resurrecting all those whose deaths haunt him. A machine connected to Haven is later activated that destabilizes the clones, making them vulnerable to being infected with the deadly Carrion virus. Several reanimates attempt to escape, hoping their bodies will stabilize if they are far enough away from Haven. Realizing that fleeing means potentially transmitting the Carrion virus to people outside of Haven, Jean assists Spider-Man in stopping any clones from escaping. During her efforts, she succumbs to the virus and dies.

== Reception ==
Benjamin Falbo of Looper asserted, "While not a prominent character, she appeared quite frequently, and her presence was always a welcome one." Jason Wiese of CinemaBlend called Jean DeWolff the "James Gordon to Peter Parker’s Bruce Wayne" and a "sharp cop," hoping to see the character in a feature film. Comics journalist Jonathan Miller described Jean DeWolff as a "secondary character that could facilitate a sense of continuity [in Marvel Team-Up], someone who knew only the costumed side of Peter's personality, and yet had a genuine relationship with him. Hard-edged and no-nonsense, DeWolff usually made her entrance in her vintage roadster, cigarette dangling from the corner of her mouth, a modern, post-feminist take on the classic tough-guy heroes of Dashiell Hammett and Mickey Spillane".

== Other versions ==
=== Spider-Gwen ===
An alternate universe version of Jean DeWolff from Earth-65 appears in Spider-Gwen.

=== Spider-Man Noir ===
Jean De Wolfe, a character based on Jean DeWolff from Earth-90214, appears in Spider-Man Noir: Eyes Without A Face. This version is an FBI agent.

=== Ultimate Marvel ===
Jeanne De Wolfe, an alternate universe version of Jean DeWolff from Earth-1610, appears in the Ultimate Marvel imprint. This version is a corrupt cop and informant for the Kingpin who is later killed by the Punisher.

== In other media ==
=== Television ===
Jean DeWolff appears in The Spectacular Spider-Man, voiced by Irene Bedard. This version is a patrol officer of Native American descent and the partner of Stan Carter who is generally distrustful of Spider-Man despite Carter's enthusiasm for him.

=== Film ===
Jean DeWolff appears in Spider-Man: Brand New Day, portrayed by Liza Colón-Zayas. This version is also a mother with a son and daughter named EJ and Marley.

=== Video games ===
- Jean DeWolff (renamed Jean DeWolfe) appears in Spider-Man 3, voiced by Vanessa Marshall. This version is a police detective with trust issues. In the Nintendo DS version of the game, DeWolfe is depicted as African-American.
- Jean DeWolff appears in Marvel Heroes, voiced by Mary Faber. After witnessing the Enforcers trying to kill the hero Speedball, she kills the group to save the latter's life. However, the Kingpin obtains video footage of the incident and blackmails DeWolff into becoming one of his informants. Her double life is discovered by reporter Ben Urich, who mentions it to the other heroes. After helping defeat Bullseye, DeWolff has a change of heart and turns herself in.
- Jean DeWolff appears in The Amazing Spider-Man 2, voiced by Misty Lee. This version is a maverick cop who is secretly gathering information on New York criminal organizations and bosses with the intent of taking them all down.
