= Eddie Brock =

Marvel Comics fictional character

- Eddie Brock as Venom in The Amazing Spider-Man #300 (May 1988). Art by Todd McFarlane.

Publication information
- Publisher: Marvel Comics
- First appearance: As Eddie Brock: Web of Spider-Man #18 (September 1986); As Venom: (cameo appearance); The Amazing Spider-Man #299 (April 1988) (full appearance); The Amazing Spider-Man #300 (May 1988); As Anti-Venom: The Amazing Spider-Man #569 (October 2008); As Toxin: Venom #17 (May 2012); As Sleeper: Venom: First Host #3 (August 2018); As King in Black: King in Black #5 (April 2021); As Carnage: Eddie Brock: Carnage #1 (January 2025)
- Created by: David Michelinie (writer); Todd McFarlane (artist)

In-story information
- Full name: Edward Charles Allan Brock
- Place of origin: New York City
- Team affiliations: Sinister Six; Revengers; Savage Six; Symbiote Task Force; Daily Bugle; FBI; Savage Avengers
- Partnerships: Spider-Man
- Notable aliases: Venom, Anti-Venom, Toxin, Sleeper, King in Black, Carnage
- Abilities: Alien symbiote grants: Superhuman strength, speed, agility, reflexes, stamina, and durability; Ability to cling to most surfaces; Organic webbing; Limited shapeshifting and camouflage; Symbiote's autonomous defense capabilities; Undetectable by Spider-Man's spider-sense

Edward Charles Allan "Eddie" Brock is a character appearing in American comic books published by Marvel Comics. The character was created by David Michelinie and Todd McFarlane, making a cameo appearance in Web of Spider-Man #18 (September 1986), before making his first full appearance in The Amazing Spider-Man #300 (May 1988) as the most well-known host of the Venom symbiote. The character has since appeared in many Marvel Comics publications, including Venom. He has endured as one of Spider-Man's most prominent villains. He later evolved into an antihero, slowly distancing himself from his initial goal to ruin Spider-Man's life to instead do good, even occasionally allying with Spider-Man.

In the original version of the story, Eddie Brock is a journalist who publicly exposes the identity of a man he believes is a serial killer, the Sin-Eater, only to find his reputation ruined when Spider-Man captures the real killer. Disgraced and suicidal with a growing irrational hatred for Spider-Man, Eddie comes into contact with an alien symbiote that had been rejected by Peter Parker. The symbiote bonds with him and they become Venom, together seeking out revenge against their mutual enemy. Though he repeatedly comes into conflict with Spider-Man, he also attempts to operate as a hero, albeit a violent one, seeking to save those he deems "innocent" and avoid any collateral damage in his clashes with Spider-Man. In 2008, after being separated from the Venom symbiote, he serves as the anti-hero host of the Anti-Venom symbiote which is sacrificed to help cure the "Spider-Island" epidemic during the 2011 storyline. In 2012, he was bonded to the Toxin symbiote, reuniting with the Venom symbiote in 2016. While Eddie was originally a human with no powers, the Venom symbiote suit bestows upon him a range of abilities including many of Spider-Man's powers, culminating in him becoming a living symbiote and the King in Black at the conclusion of the event of the same name in 2021 (leaving his son Dylan to join up with Venom), and be stuck in a time loop with his future selves Tyro, Wilde, Finnegan, Bedlam, Meridius, and The Eventuality forming the symbiote ruling council of the Kings in Black. On the loop's breakage, Eddie makes a situational alliance with and becomes the host of the Carnage symbiote, training it as an anti-hero.

Debuting in the Modern Age of Comic Books, the character has featured in various Marvel-endorsed products outside of comics, including feature films, animated television series, and video games; and merchandise such as action figures, and trading cards. Topher Grace portrays Eddie Brock/Venom in Spider-Man 3 (2007), while Tom Hardy portrays the character in Sony's Spider-Man Universe's films Venom (2018), Venom: Let There Be Carnage (2021) and Venom: The Last Dance (2024) as well as a post-credits scene in the Marvel Cinematic Universe film Spider-Man: No Way Home (2021).

One of Spider-Man's most famous rogues and a fan-favorite character, the Eddie Brock incarnation of Venom was rated 33rd on the 50 Greatest Comic Book Characters by Empire, and ranked 22nd on IGN's list of 100 Greatest Comic Villains of All Time. Comics journalist and historian Mike Conroy writes of the character: "What started out as a replacement costume for Spider-Man turned into one of the Marvel web-slinger's greatest nightmares".

== Publication history ==
=== Creation and conception ===
Writer David Michelinie and artist Todd McFarlane are generally credited with the character's creation, based on a number of plot ideas and concepts from various other creators. The question of who created the character of Venom became an issue of contention in 1993 when Michelinie wrote to the comic book industry magazine Wizard, which had referred to Michelinie in issue #17 as "co-creator" of Venom. In his letter, printed in issue #21 (May 1993), Michelinie wrote that he was the character's sole creator, while acknowledging that without McFarlane the character would not have attained the popularity it did.

Writer Peter David corroborated Michelinie's view in his "But I Digress" column in the June 4, 1993 Comics Buyer's Guide, in which he stated that Michelinie discussed the ideas behind the character with him at the time of its creation. At that time, David was the writer on The Spectacular Spider-Man and wrote the "Sin Eater" storyline from which Eddie Brock's backstory would be derived, well before McFarlane was assigned to the art duties on Amazing. Because the artist who illustrates a character's first published appearance is generally credited as its co-creator (especially if that artist is the one who designs the character's visual appearance), Venom represents a complex situation, because the costume from which Venom's appearance is derived was not designed by McFarlane.

Erik Larsen responded to Michelinie's letter with one of his own that was printed in Wizard #23 (July 1993), in which he dismissed Michelinie's contributions to the character, arguing that Michelinie merely "swiped" the preexisting symbiote and its powers to place it on a character whose motivations were poorly conceived, one-dimensional, unbelievable, and clichéd. Larsen also argued that it was McFarlane's rendition of the character that made it commercial.

The preexisting elements that dealt with the symbiote costume itself—to which Michelinie did not contribute—have also been noted. The original idea of a new costume for Spider-Man that would later become the character Venom was conceived of by a Marvel Comics reader from Norridge, Illinois named Randy Schueller. Marvel purchased the idea for $220.00 after the editor-in-chief at the time, Jim Shooter, sent Schueller a letter acknowledging Marvel's desire to acquire the idea from him, in 1982. Schueller's design was then modified by Mike Zeck, becoming the Symbiote costume. For example, Shooter came up with the idea of switching Spider-Man to a black-and-white costume, possibly influenced by the intended costume design for the new Spider-Woman, with artists Mike Zeck and Rick Leonardi, as well as others, designing the black-and-white costume.

Writer/artist John Byrne asserts on his website that the idea for a costume made of self-healing biological material was one he originated when he was the artist on Iron Fist to explain how that character's costume was constantly being torn and then apparently repaired by the next issue, explaining that he ended up not using the idea on that title, but that Roger Stern later asked him if he could use the idea for Spider-Man's alien costume. Stern in turn plotted the issue in which the costume first appeared but then left the title. It was writer Tom DeFalco and artist Ron Frenz who had established that the costume was a sentient alien being, and that it was vulnerable to high sonic energy during their run on The Amazing Spider-Man that preceded Michelinie's. Regardless, Peter David's position is that Michelinie is the sole creator, since the idea of creating a separate character using the alien symbiote was Michelinie's, as was Eddie Brock's backstory, and that without the idea to create such a character, the character would not have existed.

In an interview with Tom DeFalco, McFarlane states that Michelinie did indeed come up with the idea of Venom and the character's basic design ("a big guy in the black costume"). However, he contends that it was he (McFarlane) who gave Venom his monster-like features. He claims; "I just wanted to make him kooky and creepy, and not just some guy in a black suit".

This dispute arose at a time when the merits of artists as collaborators and writers were being debated in the industry, a discussion prompted by the popularity of artists such as McFarlane, Larsen, and other founders of Image Comics.

Venom's existence was first indicated in Web of Spider-Man #18 (Sept. 1986), when he shoves Peter Parker in front of a subway train without Parker's spider-sense warning him, though only Eddie Brock's hand is seen on-panel. The next indication of Venom's existence was in Web of Spider-Man #24 (March 1987), when Parker has climbed out of a high story window to change into Spider-Man, but finds a black arm coming through the window and grabbing him, again without being warned by his spider-sense.

The character would remain unseen and inactive until Amazing Spider-Man editor Jim Salicrup required a villain for that book's 300th issue, and Michelinie suggested a villain consisting of the alien symbiote grafted onto the body of a human female; seeking revenge for the deaths of her husband and miscarried baby who would accidentally die as the unfortunate result of Spider-Man battling another supervillain. Due to cultural sensibilities at the time and issues with the character's back story potentially angering the moral majority, Salicrup forced Michelinie to create a male character instead. Michelinie then devised the Eddie Brock identity. Michelinie contends that the plots for issues #298–299, as well as the visual descriptions of the character, were written and bought by Salicrup before McFarlane was ever assigned to the book. In a 2014 interview with the YouTube channel ComicPop, Michelinie said he was disappointed that the female character arc was never explored, but felt that changing the character to male ultimately had minimal effect on his vision for the character. In the same interview, Michelinie remarked that he was largely happy with the treatment Eddie Brock had received by successive Marvel writers.

== Fictional character biography ==
=== Backstory ===
The 1993 limited series Venom: Lethal Protector describes Brock's history before bonding with the symbiote. As a child, Edward Brock is raised in a Catholic household in San Francisco. Eddie's mother Jamie dies from complications during his birth. As a result, his father Carl Brock is cold and unaffectionate towards him. Eddie excels in academics and sports in an attempt to earn his father's approval but does not succeed. In college, Brock switches his major to journalism after reading an article on the Watergate scandal. At one point after getting drunk, he accidentally hit and killed a child with Carl's car. Eddie wanted to get what he deserved, but his father did not let him to go to prison much to Eddie's dismay. After graduating and romancing Anne Weying, he moves to New York City and obtains a job as a journalist for the Daily Globe. Though he proves himself to be a highly talented journalist, his father still only treats him with indifference.

As a reporter, Brock investigates the serial killer Sin-Eater and is contacted by Emil Gregg, who claims to be the killer. Pressured by the authorities to reveal the killer's identity, Brock writes an exposé announcing Gregg as the Sin-Eater. However, the real Sin-Eater is caught by Spider-Man and Brock is revealed to have been interviewing a compulsive confessor. Brock is fired from his job in disgrace and Anne divorces him. Unable to find reputable work, he is forced to work for tabloid magazines and Carl disowns him. Unable to cope with his own mistakes, Brock becomes obsessed with gaining revenge against Spider-Man, blaming him for catching the real Sin-Eater. Brock takes up bodybuilding to reduce stress but his anger and depression remain. Meanwhile, Spider-Man uses the sound of bells at a church to remove his symbiote costume after realizing it is attempting to permanently bond with him. His professional and personal life shattered, Brock contemplates suicide and goes to the same church, where he prays to God for forgiveness. The Symbiote, having waited in the rafters of the church since leaving Spider-Man, senses Brock and bonds with him, granting him powers equal to and greater than those of Spider-Man, and imparting knowledge of Spider-Man's secret identity.

=== Venom ===
Venom begins a campaign of torment against Peter, who is still unaware of his existence. He first pushes Peter in front of a moving subway and later reaches from behind a window and dislodges him as he scales a building, both times without activating his spider-sense. He eventually terrorizes Spider-Man's wife Mary Jane, and baits the hero to his apartment for their first confrontation, where Venom reveals his true identity to Spider-Man, claiming "You may call me Venom, for that's what I'm paid to spew out these days!" Spider-Man discovers that the Symbiote has completely bonded with Brock and cannot be killed without also killing Brock. Eventually Venom is tricked into weakening himself by expending too much webbing until the suit lacks enough material to produce more. Venom is incarcerated in the Vault, from which he makes repeated escapes and escape attempts, only to suffer defeats and returns to the Vault.

Brock eventually fakes suicide and escapes after being taken to the morgue. During a battle with Spider-Man, the Symbiote is seemingly killed by the plague-inducing villain Styx, giving its life to protect Brock. Brock is incarcerated and Spider-Man disposes of the Symbiote's remains. The Symbiote survives by entering a comatose state to fight off the illness and it returns to Brock, enabling him to again escape from jail. During the escape, the symbiote asexually reproduces and leaves behind its spawn. The offspring quickly bonds to Brock's cellmate, Cletus Kasady, creating Carnage. Venom abducts Spider-Man and transports him to a remote island to do battle. Spider-Man fakes his own death to convince Venom that his vendetta is over. Venom, content with the outcome, resigns himself to life on the island. Spider-Man eventually faces Carnage but is unable to defeat him. Spider-Man is forced to ask Venom for help, promising him freedom in exchange. However, after they defeat Carnage, Spider-Man betrays Venom (who had also resumed his plan of revenge and tried to throttle the arachnoid hero to death) by summoning the Fantastic Four and sending him back to prison.

=== Anti-hero ===
After seeing a photo of Spider-Man's recently returned parents, Brock escapes from prison, and kidnaps them. During the resulting fight, Brock's ex-wife, Anne Weying, is nearly crushed under a falling Ferris wheel, but Spider-Man saves her. Seeing this act, Venom makes peace with Spider-Man. In Venom: Lethal Protector (1993), Venom moves to San Francisco and acts as the protector of an underground society of homeless people. He is later taken prisoner by the Life Foundation who harvest the last five spawn within the symbiote to create super-powered policemen and Brock is forcibly separated from the symbiote. With Spider-Man's help, Brock is reunited with the symbiote and they seemingly destroy his spawn, Phage, Lasher, Riot, Scream and Agony, before escaping. After saving the homeless people, Venom is accepted into their society and remains their protector.

In the 1993 crossover Maximum Carnage, Carnage reemerges and begins a massacre in New York City, and Brock returns to help, feeling responsible. Venom finds he is no match for Carnage, and seeks help from Spider-Man, but Spider-Man refuses to work with Venom's violent methods. Venom, accompanied by Black Cat, Cloak, Morbius, and Spider-Man, repeatedly confront Carnage and his allies. Venom ultimately tackles Carnage into high-voltage generators, rendering Carnage unconscious and allowing his capture by the Avengers. Brock goes into hiding.

Brock returns in the 1994 limited series Separation Anxiety, in which he is captured and separated from the symbiote for a government research project. Venom's spawn: Phage, Lasher, Scream, Riot, and Agony are revealed to still be alive and arrive to free Brock, seeking his help to gain control over their symbiotes. Brock is ultimately reunited with the symbiote, but the experience forces him to evaluate his relationship with the costume. The 1995 "Planet of the Symbiotes" event continued the narrative from Separation Anxiety, with Brock forcing the symbiote to leave him, concerned about how much influence it may be having on him. The symbiote unleashes a telepathic scream of sorrow and pain that attracts the other members of its species to Earth. The story follows the efforts of Brock, Spider-Man, and Scarlet Spider (Ben Reilly) to stop the invasion and defeat an escaped and empowered Carnage. Brock is forced to bond completely and irrevocably with the symbiote to inflict psychic trauma on the symbiotes, causing them to commit suicide.

=== Return to villainy ===
When Anne Weying is shot by a new Sin-Eater, Brock forces the Symbiote to bond with her to heal her injuries. In the process she temporarily becomes She-Venom but Brock demands the Symbiote return after Anne loses control and kills a pair of muggers, leaving Anne traumatized. Brock helps kill the new Sin-Eater. Anne is taken into custody by the police as they try to hunt Venom and Brock sends her his Symbiote so she can escape. As She-Venom she again struggles to control herself, with Brock, Weying and current Spider-Man Ben Reilly becoming caught in the middle of a joint DEA/FBI operation against a major drug smuggler when Weying and Brock rendezvous at the same location where the drug group are meeting. When Brock takes back the Symbiote, Anne tells him to keep himself and the Symbiote away from her after witnessing his brutality against the criminals.

Brock is captured in his sewer hideout and put on trial, with Matt Murdock acting in his defense, his symbiote held in check by a chemical inhibitor. Cletus Kasady is called as a witness, but when the case becomes heated both Kasady and Brock overcome their inhibitors. Venom, Spider-Man, and Daredevil team up and subdue Carnage. However, before the trial can continue Venom is unexpectedly taken into custody by a secret government organization offering him amnesty in exchange for him becoming their agent. Though Venom at first enjoyed his newfound immunities, he left after being abandoned during a dangerous mission. After receiving a head wound, Eddie suffers amnesia. He is later separated from the symbiote, which is presumed killed by the government Overreach Committee.

The symbiote survives and tracks down the amnesiac Brock, turning him into Venom again. Venom infiltrates Ravencroft prison seeking Carnage and absorbs the Carnage Symbiote. Brock temporarily joins the Sinister Six to get Spider-Man but after being betrayed by them, he begins hunting down the members for revenge. He ultimately cripples Sandman by biting him and taking out a chunk of his mass, leading to Sandman's apparent death. He also causes serious wounds to Electro and Kraven the Hunter.

Venom's rivalry with Spider-Man is renewed when Anne, who lives in fear since bonding with the Symbiote, commits suicide after seeing Brock become Venom. Venom however, believes Spider-Man swinging by Anne's window in his black costume to be the cause. Before he can take revenge however, the Symbiote is forcefully removed from him by the human/alien hybrid Senator Ward to learn more about symbiosis. An alien race, secretly operating within the United States government, clones the Venom symbiote. Venom absorbs the clone, gains its knowledge, and decides to carry out the aliens' orders.

=== Cancer and post-Venom ===
Eddie Brock, separated from the symbiote, dying from cancer in The Sensational Spider-Man vol. 2 #39 (August 2007). Art by Rick Hoberg

The 2003 story "The Hunger" introduced new elements to Brock's origin, revealing that Brock had cancer before joining with the symbiote, and that it chose to bond with Brock not only for his hatred towards Spider-Man, but also because the cancer causes the release of adrenaline, which feeds the symbiote. Brock is left reliant on the suit to live, and pursues Spider-Man also out of fear that he will take the symbiote back, rather than just for revenge over his lost career. Brock dies after the symbiote leaves him for Spider-Man, not wanting a diseased host. Spider-Man tricks the symbiote into again bonding with Brock, reviving him.

When Carnage gives birth to a new symbiote, Venom names it Toxin and hopes to turn it into an ally. When Toxin shows compassion, Venom tries to kill him. Toxin is rescued by Spider-Man and Black Cat.

In the 2004 story "Venomous", Brock experiences a crisis of faith and decides to sell the symbiote, knowing he will rapidly die from his cancer without it, intending to donate the $100 million received from the sale to charity on the grounds that the symbiote would find another host once he dies anyway. The symbiote is purchased by crime boss Don Fortunato for his son Angelo Fortunato. Angelo briefly becomes the second Venom but proves an unworthy host, and the symbiote abandons him mid-jump allowing him to fall to his death. Upon learning of Angelo's death, Brock feels responsible and attempts suicide by slitting his wrists. Brock next appeared in the 2007 story "The Last Temptation of Eddie Brock", where he is rapidly succumbing to cancer, and experiencing hallucinations of "Venom". Finding a comatose Aunt May in the same hospital, dying from a gunshot, the Venom hallucination persuades him to kill her. Brock, dressed in a novelty replica of Spider-Man's black costume at the demand of "Venom", murders an "angel of mercy" nurse to test if he can still kill, but ultimately refuses to kill May because she is innocent. When Peter visits May, he finds Eddie, who has repeatedly cut his own wrists to get rid of "Venom". Eddie asks for Peter's forgiveness before jumping out of a window, but Peter manages to catch him. Awakening chained to his bed, Brock finds he can still see "Venom" but tells him that he accepts its presence as long as it knows that Brock is in control.

=== Anti-Venom ===
The 2008 story New Ways to Die features the return of Brock. Matt Murdock convinces a court of law that Brock is not responsible for his actions while bonded to the symbiote and has criminal charges against him dropped. Brock gets a job at a soup kitchen under Martin Li. Brock is unknowingly cured of his cancer by Li, who possesses special abilities, and Brock believes it to be a miracle. After Brock is attacked by the new Venom, Mac Gargan, the symbiote attempts to reunite with Brock. Brock's skin becomes caustic to the symbiote, and he is enveloped in a new white symbiote forged from the remnants of the Venom symbiote in his body bonding with his white blood cells charged with Li's healing energy, becoming Anti-Venom. Brock defeats Gargan and nearly kills the Venom symbiote. When Brock detects remnants of the symbiote inside Spider-Man, he attempts to "cure" him, draining radiation from his body and nearly de-powering him. While later saving Spider-Man from Norman Osborn, Brock again fights a battle-suit enhanced Gargan and the recovering symbiote. Gargan hits Anti-Venom with his stinger, injecting a poisonous formula that seemingly destroys Brock's suit. When Gargan attempts to kill Brock, the Venom symbiote stops him. Brock's Anti-Venom suit later reforms.

Brock later faces Negative and discovers that he and Li are the same person. Learning that the man he idolized is a supervillain causes a breakdown for Brock, making him question his faith, referring to himself as a monster. After this revelation he becomes increasingly unstable mentally, murdering small-time criminals as he did during his "lethal protector" days. He briefly and reluctantly teams up with the Punisher to stop a drug cartel that kidnapped a friend of Brock's. In "The Return of Anti-Venom" (2011), Brock is unable to expose Negative's true identity, believing no one will trust him. Anti-Venom starts a crusade against Negative, attacking his criminal operations. When Anti-Venom realizes that May Parker also knows Negative's identity, he decides to attack Negative directly before Negative can silence her. Brock teams up with Spider-Man and the new Wraith to fight Negative. Wraith uses her technology to publicly reveal Mister Negative is Martin Li, sending him into hiding. Spider-Man and Anti-Venom call a truce to their rivalry.

In a 2011 New Avengers storyline, Brock joins Wonder Man's Revengers to destroy the New Avengers. During the 2011 "Spider-Island" storyline in which 99% of New York City's population are transformed into spiders mind-controlled by Adriana Soria, Brock is forced to sacrifice the symbiote—and being Anti-Venom—so that it can be converted into a powerful curative capable of healing the infected millions.

=== Bonded to Toxin ===
A powerless Brock returns in Venom vol. 2 #15 (2012), where he kills the symbiotes Hybrid and Scream as part of a crusade to destroy the aliens entirely, believing them to be evil. After failing to kill Agent Venom, Brock is captured by the villain Crime Master and forcibly bonded with the Toxin symbiote. Brock (who is being controlled by the Toxin symbiote) then tracks down Venom and attempts to kill him, but is defeated. Eddie and Agent Venom face off once more at Crime Master's HQ, and Flash is able to subdue Toxin and separate Eddie from the symbiote using a flamethrower. Just before Flash can get Eddie out, the Toxin symbiote grabs hold of him and drags him into the flames. Eddie and the Toxin symbiote both survive the flames and track Flash to Philadelphia. Now in control of the Toxin symbiote, he confronts Flash in the high school where he works as a gym teacher. After helping Flash defend the students from a group of cybernetic parasites, Eddie forms a truce with him, promising to leave Flash alone as long as he has the Venom symbiote under control (similar to the truce he had with Spider-Man). Eddie subsequently leaves Philadelphia to resume his vigilante activities.

While fighting a drug cartel, Brock is approached by FBI agent Claire Dixon and invited to join the team she has assembled to hunt down and capture Cletus Kasady, which also includes John Jameson, and Manuela Calderon, a survivor of one of Kasady's massacres, although Brock secretly plans to kill Kasady. After Kasady's defeat, Brock gives up the Toxin symbiote.

=== Return as Venom ===
Eddie Brock decides to help the FBI against the new villainous Venom. With the FBI and Spider-Man, Brock is able to separate the symbiote from its new host, Lee Price. In the process, Spider-Man's actions cause the symbiote to rekindle its previous hatred for him. Brock then breaks the symbiote out of custody and bonds with it again, declaring his love for it and now regularly referring to it as "my darling" and "love". After stopping a robbery, Brock encounters Scorpion and manages to defeat him, until the symbiote takes him to a church and reveals that it attacked the priest. After finding out about a monster attack, Brock encounters a dinosaur at the church and discovers it belongs to Alchemax. While talking to Alchemax's CEO Liz Allan, he learns that the mastermind is Stegron. Brock then finds his lair, but is spotted and captured by Stegron's dinosaurs. Venom found that remnants of Stegron's Dinosaur People experiments were living in the sewers, and he had to defend them from Kraven the Hunter, Shriek, and the NYPD. With help from Tana of the Dinosaur People, Venom states to the NYPD that the Dinosaur People were surviving in the sewers and that they were not killing anyone. Upon hearing this, the NYPD arrest Kraven and Shriek with the police captain stating that he will have a lot of paperwork to file on this.

During the Venom Inc. storyline, Eddie helps Spider-Man, Black Cat, and Flash Thompson (now known as Agent Anti-Venom) take down Lee Price again, who had bonded himself with Venom's clone Mania and was using it to take over the New York criminal underground. Eddie then tells Black Cat to give up her criminal empire, telling her that New York City always needs more heroes.

In the "Go Down Swinging" storyline, Eddie is blackmailed by J. Jonah Jameson into helping defend Spider-Man's inner circle against Norman Osborn, who has bonded himself with the Carnage symbiote to become the Red Goblin. Jameson sends Eddie to defend Mary Jane Watson at Stark Tower and while she does not trust him, Mary Jane disables Stark Tower's anti symbiote defenses to allow Eddie to fight Norman. Spider-Man arrives and teams up again with Eddie to stop Red Goblin, but the villain overpowers them both. With nothing left to offer in the fight against Osborn and Carnage, Eddie allows Peter to take the Venom symbiote for himself to even the odds against his foe. Because of his offering and valiant defense of Mary Jane, Spider-Man forgives Eddie for everything he had done to him in the past.

In Venom: First Host, Venom gives birth to the Sleeper symbiote. Shortly afterward, Eddie is attacked by a Warbride Skrull until a Kree intervenes and starts battling the Skrull. The Kree reveals to Eddie that his name is Tel-Kar and that he is Venom's first host. When the symbiote refused to go back to Tel-Kar, infuriated Tel-Kar threatened them that he would bond to the offspring and transform it into a monster, if he did not get "his" symbiote back. The Skrull, M'Lanz, informs Eddie that she was tasked to stop Tel-Kar and that Tel-Kar was biologically altered so he would have full control over Venom's mind. Sleeper bonds with Eddie and goes after Tel-Kar. Eddie goes to a Skrull research lab, which houses a deadly bioweapon that Tel-Kar intends to use on the Skrulls. After M'Lanz leaves Eddie with the symbiotes on Earth, Eddie cuts every connection to Alchemax, and after that he and Harry Osborn talk for a while. Tel-Kar shows up in Eddie's apartment and threatens to kill him and all of humanity using the bioweapon. Sleeper bonds to Tel-Kar, lobotomizing him as a punishment for his actions. Sleeper bids Eddie farewell and leaves Earth to explore the cosmos.

=== War with Knull ===
In the Venom ongoing series, Eddie is seen struggling with the symbiote, which has returned to its violent ways. Using anti-depressants, Eddie is able to calm the symbiote and reassert control over it. While working as a freelance photographer, he stumbles upon an arms deal between a gang of criminals and the mercenary Jack O'Lantern. The deal turns violent and Eddie uses the symbiote to take down Jack. The symbiote then completely overtakes Eddie, compelled by a mysterious external influence, nearly killing Jack in the process before being subdued and captured by Rex Strickland. Strickland tells Eddie that despite what was previously thought, Venom was not the first to arrive on Earth. Strickland explains that the US Government bonded special forces operatives to symbiotes during the Vietnam War. These soldiers later went rogue, and Eddie is tasked with rescuing them and defeating their symbiotes. Though Eddie locates Strickland's men, his symbiote is again taken over by the mysterious outside influence and briefly separates from him. The symbiote again bonds with Eddie and tells him that "God is coming".

Soon afterward, a massive dragon made up of thousands of symbiotes attacks New York City. Eddie resolves to stop the monster before it destroys the city. Before he can intervene he is attacked by Miles Morales, who uses his Venom Blast to break Venom out of the "symbiote god's" influence. Miles and Eddie form a temporary truce, and the two manage to temporarily stop the symbiote god's rampage. The symbiote god then reveals itself as a being named Knull. Knull separates Eddie from his symbiote, promising to purge the influence of humanity from it. But then Miles attacked Knull and both Eddie with Venom and Miles started falling until Venom grew a pair of wings and saved Eddie and Miles. After leaving Miles behind, Eddie went to Rex and put a hole in his head revealing that Rex was actually the symbiote ("Tyrannosaurus") that was bonded to the original Rex Strickland. After that, they tricked the dragon to come to them and started attacking it with sonic-based weapons which weaken it. Then Eddie puts the dragon with Rex in the furnace and incinerated it to death, while Eddie and Venom got wounded in the process.

The Maker interrogates Eddie about the incident revolving around the Grendel symbiote and Knull. In addition, he also talked about how the Venom symbiote is in a feral state and has been deleting Eddie's bad memories, such as when he found out that his father had remarried and that he has a child named Dylan Brock. Maker states that the only way to restore Venom's mind is to connect it to the Symbiote hive mind. Maker achieves this by taking samples from Flash Thompson, who was presumed dead.

After being framed by Cletus Kasady for the murder of Lee Price, Eddie and Dylan are on the run and rescued by Venom. Upon learning his son is Knull's current vessel and would be his host, Eddie and Dylan end up in a universe overrun by Knullified heroes and villains led by Codex (an alternate version of Dylan). He and Dylan are rescued by Agent Symbiotes (such as the alternate Anne Weying, Spider-Man, Deadpool, and Cletus Kasady). Dylan eventually learns that not only he is Eddie's son, but also Anne's. With help from the prime universe's Mac Gargan, Dylan manages to purify his older counterpart and free Earth. One year later, Eddie and Dylan return to their universe and learn that Knull has been re-awakened and invaded Earth.

=== Reign as King in Black ===
After Eddie subsequently kills Knull, he becomes a human symbiote and the new King in Black. He then comes into conflict along with the Kings in Black, who are revealed to be consisting of his possible future selves: Tyro, Wilde, Finnegan, Bedlam, Meridius, and the Eventuality. Venom joins up with Dylan, with father and son (and future selves) eventually being drawn into "war" with one another. As Meridius attempts to corrupt his alternate younger self using Carnage's abilities, Dylan severs Eddie's connection to the Symbiote Hivemind, causing him to lose his status as the King in Black. After Eddie is fatally injured and taken away by Meridius' army of Zombiotes, Dylan hijacks the weapon and powers Carnage lent to Meridius. Dylan kills his father's evil counterpart and ends up destroying Carnage's Necrospear All-Blood, causing the symbiote to lose his own King in Black powers and status he acquired through killing an alternate reality version of Knull. Carnage, now dying and needing a host again to survive, approaches Eddie Brock and proposes a deal where Eddie can set his terms.

Unbeknownst to Eddie and everyone else, Knull is resurrected to replace Eddie as the King in Black. Knull is revived in a weakened state and is imprisoned by Hela, who siphons his power to become the Queen in Black.

=== Bonded to Carnage ===
Eddie returns in Eddie Brock: Carnage, now bonded to the Carnage symbiote, who he has made a reluctant partnership with. Carnage agrees to help empower Eddie to hunt down and kill active serial killers. However, Carnage admits to Eddie that in addition to hating Eddie for a more anti-heroic viewpoint he will willingly abandon Eddie if one of the targets proves to be a more powerful and "suitable" for the homicidal symbiote. Eddie during a mission to hunt down an evil clone of Professor X encounters the Winter Soldier's New Avengers. Much to Black Widow's protest, Eddie and Carnage join the team to hunt down the rest of the "Killuminati" (a group of evil clones of the Illuminati). Eddie keeps resisting his symbiote's desire to kill their new teammates and after the final fight against the Killuminati the team per Iron Man's request disbands. However, they state if the occasion rises the team will immediately reform to oppose the threat.

== Powers and abilities ==
Eddie Brock is a human and has no superpowers without the Symbiote. Prior to joining with the Symbiote, he possesses Olympic-level strength from engaging in repeated, significant weight-training exercise.

After separating from the Symbiote and suffering from cancer, Brock loses much of his physical muscle and possesses the strength of an average human. Brock's cancer is cured in the 2008 story "New Ways to Die", and he is later shown with a restored large physique. He is also shown to be a proficient fighter and capable of using specialized weaponry to defeat symbiote-empowered enemies.

In an interview, David Michelinie stated that the reason Brock was written to be at the peak of human physical condition in the Marvel Universe was because editor Jim Salicrup felt that having an average human with no superpowers becoming stronger than Spider-Man by simply bonding with the Symbiote did not seem believable. Michelinie later clarified in the interview that a healthy Eddie Brock is stronger without super powers than Peter Parker is without his super powers, which explains how the Symbiote is able to make him stronger than Spider-Man. Michelinie later toyed with this concept in early Venom stories in The Amazing Spider-Man such as Venom vs. Spider-Man Round 2 and Venom Returns. In both of these stories Eddie is seen lifting weights and training himself without the help of the symbiote, remarking that making himself inherently stronger and more fit will enable the symbiote to grant him even greater super strength, speed, and agility.

Once Eddie became the new King in Black, he gained god-like abilities through the symbiotes Hive Mind. It granted him near omnipresent powers through the eyes of billions of symbiotes and is also capable of remote-piloting the symbiotes, though with consent unlike Knull, no matter how far away they in the universe. He also discover that he can access through the memories of the symbiotes (including his own memories), some that which are from history or even beyond dimensions; Eddie even believes that with time and patience, he may be able to travel through and even change certain events. The only consequence to obtaining this new status is that due to being a human, his body is already rapidly aging due to connecting to the hive for the past few months. After his physical body dies, Eddie is able to self-resurrect and reanimate his body as a true human-symbiote hybrid, eliminating the rapid aging issue.

=== As Venom ===
As Venom, Brock gains several abilities similar to those of Spider-Man, the Symbiote's former host, including superhuman strength, speed, agility and reflexes as well as the ability to adhere to most surfaces with his hands and feet. The Symbiote is also able to project a web-like substance from its body, similar to Spider-Man's. However, this webbing is produced organically by the Symbiote from its own mass, which means that overuse can weaken the alien until it is able to regenerate. The Symbiote can also send out tendrils which can be used to grab or manipulate items from a distance. When bonded with the host, the Symbiote allows the host to bypass Spider-Man's spider-sense, preventing the hero from sensing attacks. The Symbiote is susceptible to harm from high-pitched sonic frequencies which can cause it to be severely weakened or killed. The bond between the Symbiote and Brock was strong enough that using sonics against the Symbiote could also stun and kill Brock.

Venom's body is highly resistant to injury, capable of outright stopping bladed weapons, bullets, and it can help its host survive in hostile environments by filtering air, allowing survival underwater and in toxic environments. Venom can also morph his appearance, to create disguises at will, and camouflage itself, even emulating water. It is also capable of psychically detecting its offspring; however, this ability can be blocked. This sense can be used by Brock even when separated from the suit, allowing him to detect and be detected by the Symbiote and its children. The Symbiote is capable of healing any injury and illness at an increased rate, allowing the host to survive otherwise-mortal damage. The Symbiote and host are capable of sharing knowledge, the Symbiote being able to pass on information from previous hosts to future ones.

=== As Anti-Venom ===
Anti-Venom is created when the healing energies of Martin Li cause Brock's white-blood cells and traces of the Venom Symbiote still within his body to combine into a new suit composed of human/alien hybrid antibodies possessing powerful restorative abilities. Brock is capable of rapidly healing significant injury as Anti-Venom, recovering almost instantly after being shot in the head and suffering damage to his brain. However, this healing ability can be negated by the energy of Mr. Negative, counteracting the energy of Martin Li. Anti-Venom is able to detect when others are ill and "cure" or "cleanse" them. He is able to cure ailments from hepatitis to removing narcotics and even radiation from a person's body. Following a failed attempt to "cure" Spider-Man by removing the radiation in his body, Anti-Venom now automatically cancels out Spider-Man's powers whenever the two are in close proximity to one another.

As Anti-Venom, Brock's suit is corrosive to the Venom symbiote, inflicting pain and damage on the suit to the point of causing it to dissolve. He displays similar abilities to Venom, possessing super strength, speed, negating Spider-Man's spider-sense, and being able to block damage entirely from some guns and knives. He is also capable of extending and morphing the suit to create disguises, form items such as shields, extend his reach, attack from a distance, and create tendrils. Anti-Venom is also immune to the weaknesses of the Venom Symbiote, showing no damage or effect from direct blasts of fire, heat and sound. The only shown weaknesses of the Symbiote are a highly toxic "super venom" created as a direct countermeasure using remnants of Anti-Venom's suit, and Mr. Negative's energy.

== Reception ==
- In 2022, Screen Rant ranked Venom 7th in their "10 Most Powerful Silk Villains In Marvel Comics" list.
- In 2022, Screen Rant included Venom in their "10 Best Marvel Characters Who Made Their Debut In Spider-Man Comics" list.

== Other versions ==
Eddie Brock appears in several alternate universe titles in which the character's history, circumstances and behavior may vary slightly or extensively from the mainstream setting.

=== Ultimate Spider-Man ===
An alternate universe version of Eddie Brock appears in Ultimate Spider-Man. This version is a college student studying the Venom suit, which his father Edward Brock Sr. developed as a cure for cancer along with Richard Parker, father of Eddie's former friend Peter. After Peter reaches out to him while looking into his father's old work, Eddie attempts to rekindle their friendship. When Gwen storms out in disgust, Eddie turns on the television to see a news report of Spider-Man with the Venom suit, and rushes to the lab to find an injured Peter in the process of destroying it. Eddie returns to the lab and removes a second sample of the suit from storage, inadvertently bonding with it. Driven insane, he spends the following months in feeding frenzies, eventually selling it before regretting his actions and trying to get it back. Portions of Venom remain within Eddie's body and eventually regenerate. Eddie is later killed by a spy, who takes Venom for research.

=== Marvel Adventures ===
In the reality of Earth-20051 in Marvel Adventures Spider-Man, Eddie Brock is a cat burglar whose latest heist Peter has foiled. After Peter is separated from his benevolent sentient "smart-stealth cloth" suit (created by the Tinkerer), it bonds with Eddie in an attempt to make its way back to Peter, only for Eddie to try and kill Peter with it on finding it. After the symbiote attempts to leave him to return to Peter, Peter knocks Eddie with out with it and both are sent to the Vault. Sometime later, Peter finds Eddie to have supposedly reformed since being released from prison to use the symbiote as the rival superhero Venom, showing off dating White Rabbit, before apparently being kidnapped and requiring Peter to take the symbiote back to save him, only for Peter to deduce Venom was simply the symbiote alone: after Eddie had attempted to use the symbiote to murder Peter on his release from prison, Venom had turned off Eddie's brain and used his body to be a hero and try and convince Peter to take him back, having been attempting to make Peter jealous with his actions the entire time. Accepting his fake kidnapping ruse as being uncovered, the symbiote resumes hero work with Eddie's corpse and hopes Peter will one day take him back.

=== Spider-Gwen: Predators ===
In the reality of Earth-65 in Spider-Gwen: Predators, Dr. Elsa Brock creates the Venom symbiote while researching the Radioactive Spider Isotopes Dr. Cindy Moon had created to keep Agent 77 from knowing he'd been cured so-as to remain in her service, later providing Gwen Stacy the symbiote so-as to restore her powers as Spider-Woman.

=== Edge of Spider-Geddon ===
In the reality of Earth-14512 in Edge of Spider-Geddon, 16-year-old Peni Parker is approached by Addy Brock, asking if she was the pilot of SP//dr and her experiences as the SP//dr pilot. Peni ignores her, but Addy follows up by saying she is not as special as she thinks, before clarifying that she does not mean as an insult, and just wants to talk to her. Later, while improving the SP//dr's web shooters, Peni notices Addy walking in the base and follows her, only to find another mech-suit similar to the SP//dr, but in black and powered by a "sym-engine" called VEN#m, with Addy as its pilot. Peni becomes furious at Ben and May for not telling her about this. When a kaiju-like creature named M.O.R.B.I.U.S. starts to drain the city's electrical energy, Peni goes after it as SP//dr, only to be temporarily disabled due to her frustration clouding her judgement. In order to defeat M.O.R.B.I.U.S., Peni's handlers "Aunt May" and "Uncle Ben" send VEN#m to defeat the creature. It is successful, but the SYM Engine inside it, which is shown to not be fully developed and is later revealed to still have unresolved issues, causes VEN#m to malfunction and gain sentience.

=== Spider-Man: Spider's Shadow ===
In the reality of Earth-21619 in Spider-Man: Spider's Shadow, Eddie Brock is a disgraced reporter who murders Otto Octavius and takes his tentacles to become the new Doctor Octopus ("Brock Ock"), joining the Sinister Six in an attempt to kill Spider-Man. On being arrested and charged with Octavius' murder, Eddie is surprised by a repented J. Jonah Jameson being willing to testify on his behalf.

=== Kings in Black ===
Venom Volume 5 and the event series Venom War reveal Earth-616 Eddie's future selves to form the council of the Kings in Black, consisting of Meridius, Bedlam, Finnegan, Wilde, Tyro, and the Eventuality.

== In other media ==
=== Television ===
- Eddie Brock / Venom appears in Spider-Man: The Animated Series, voiced by Hank Azaria. This version is a journalist for the Daily Bugle until he is fired by J. Jonah Jameson for falsely reporting Spider-Man as a thief who stole a foreign object from astronaut John Jameson's spaceship. Brock later bonds with the Venom symbiote to seek revenge against Spider-Man under the belief that the webslinger ruined his journalism career, only to be defeated and separated. In the episodes "Venom Returns" and "Carnage", Brock is reunited with the Venom symbiote and joins forces with Spider-Man and Iron Man to defeat Carnage, Baron Mordo, and Dormammu before he and Venom sacrifice themselves to ensure the villains' defeat.
- Eddie Brock / Venom appears in Spider-Man Unlimited, voiced by Brian Drummond. He and Carnage travel to Counter-Earth to join the Synoptic, a hive mind of symbiotes, and ally with the High Evolutionary while secretly helping the Synoptic grow more powerful to infect the planet's population with symbiotes. In the episode "One is the Loneliest Number", Brock is briefly separated from the Venom symbiote and is shown to have become dependent on it for survival. In the series finale, the High Evolutionary separates Venom and Carnage from their respective hosts, but the two symbiotes succeed in unleashing the Synoptic on Counter-Earth.
- Eddie Brock / Venom appears in The Spectacular Spider-Man, voiced by Benjamin Diskin. This version is a childhood friend of Peter Parker and Gwen Stacy who attended Midtown High. However, over the course of the first season, a series of misunderstandings causes Brock to resent Parker and Spider-Man. In the episodes "Intervention" and "Nature vs. Nurture", Spider-Man attempts to destroy the symbiote that Brock was studying, but he frees and bonds with it, transforming into Venom to destroy Spider-Man, only to be foiled and separated. Throughout the second-season episodes "First Steps", "Growing Pains", and "Identity Crisis", Brock manipulates Spider-Man into reuniting him with the Venom symbiote, only to be defeated and taken into custody for treatment.
- Eddie Brock / Venom appears in Spider-Man (2017), voiced by Ben Pronsky. Following cameo appearances in the episodes "How I Thwipped My Summer Vacation" and "Between an Ock and a Hard Place", in which he works under J. Jonah Jameson at the Daily Bugle and slowly grows envious of Peter Parker, Brock returns in the episode "Dead Man's Party", in which is assigned to take pictures of the V-252 symbiote before merging with it, with his jealousy of Parker revising the organism's memories of its previous bond with Spider-Man. Dubbing himself Venom, Brock battles Spider-Man, only to be driven back by air horns. In the episode "Venom Returns", Brock takes Parker's friends and acquaintances hostage and exposes his secret identity, but Miles Morales dons a spare Spider-Man costume to refute the claim. Spider-Man defeats Venom using a sonic device to destabilize the symbiote, which also leaves Brock in a coma. In the episode "Superior", the symbiote abandons Brock after mutating to the point of no longer needing a host.
- Eddie Brock will appear in the second season of Your Friendly Neighborhood Spider-Man, voiced by Josh Keaton.

=== Film ===
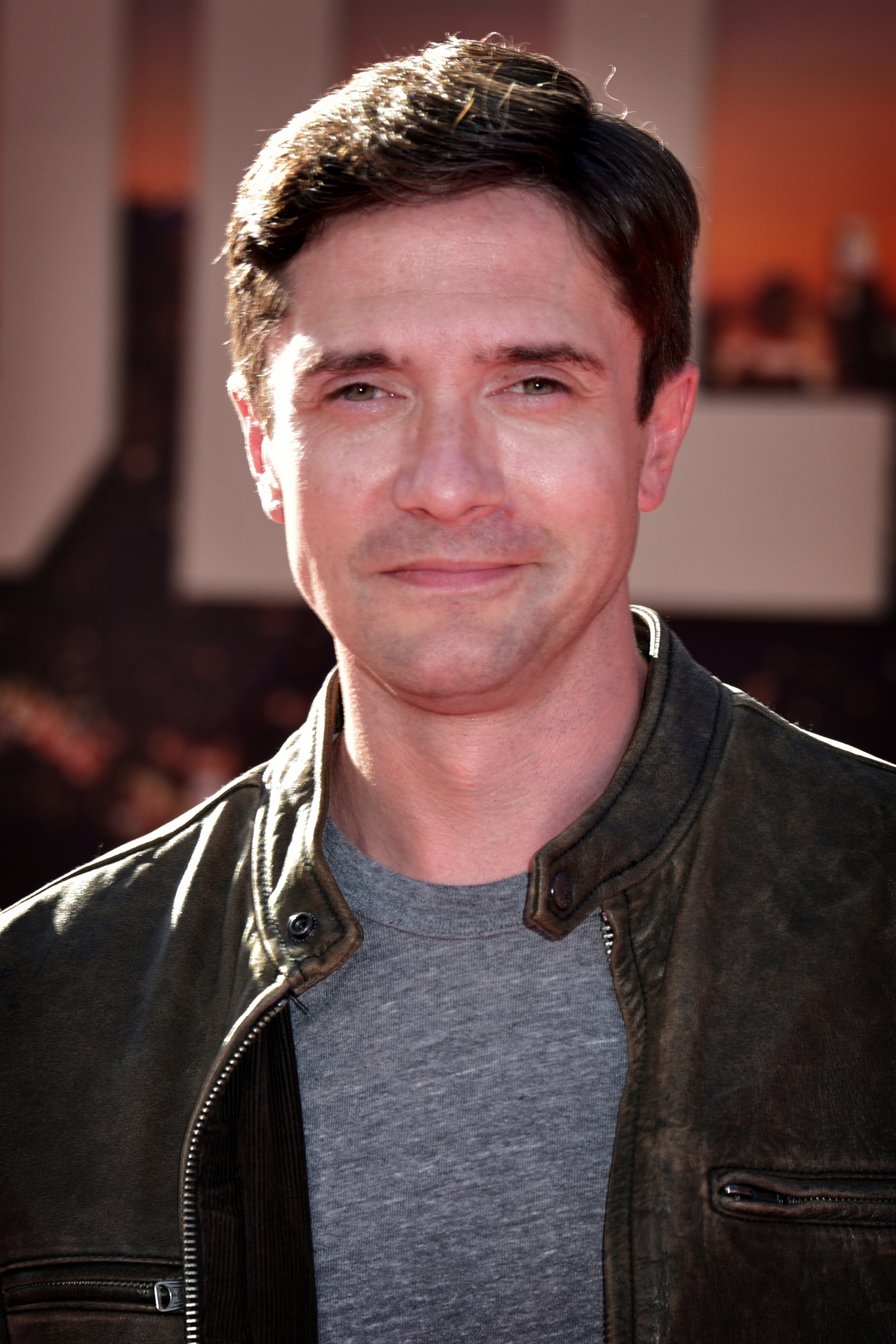
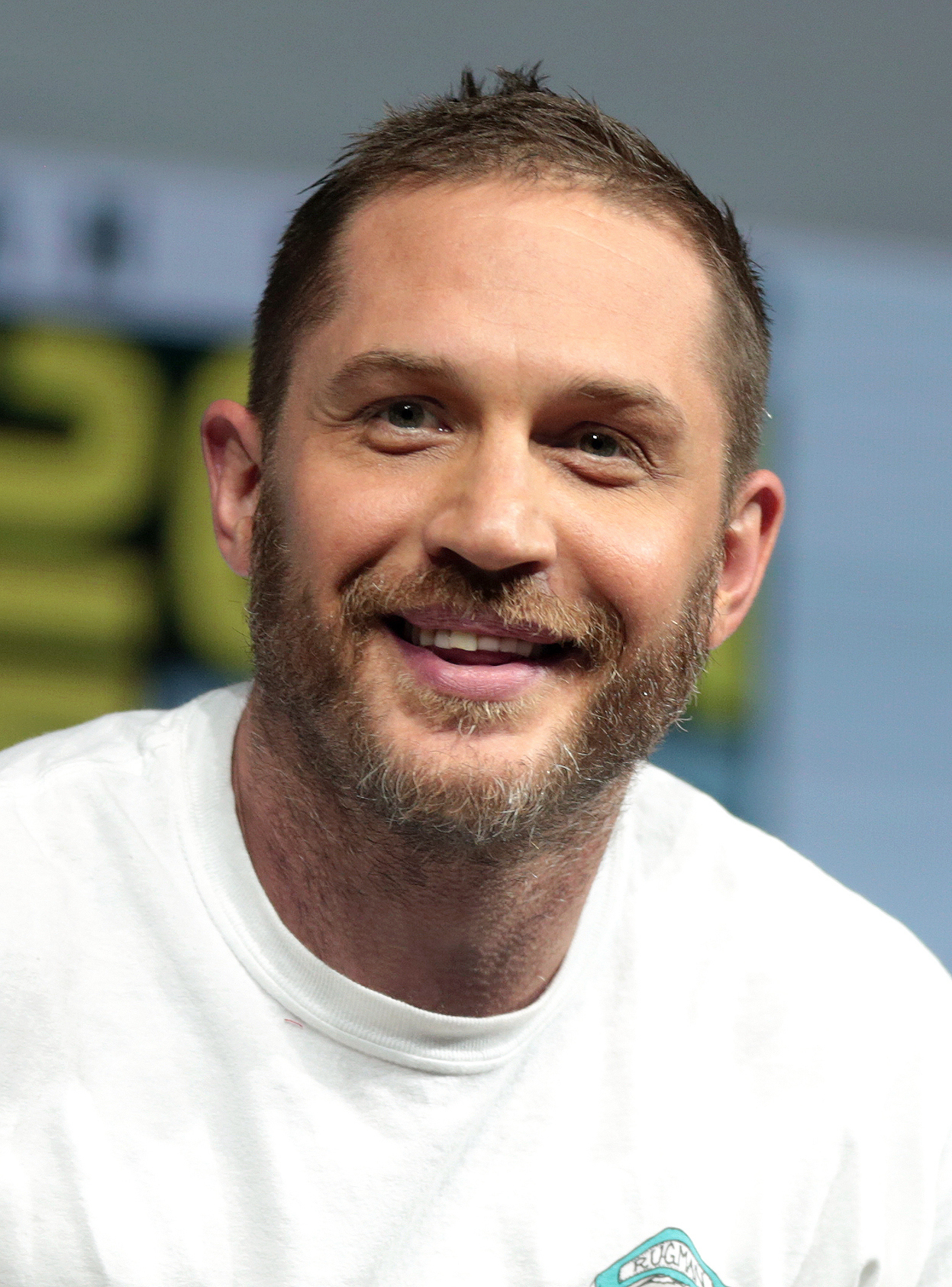
Topher Grace (left) and Tom Hardy (right) have portrayed Eddie Brock in film.

==== Sam Raimi film series ====
- Eddie Brock appears in a deleted scene in Spider-Man (2002), portrayed by R.C. Everbeck. Additionally, an "Eddie" is referenced as a photographer employed by the Daily Bugle who was unable to obtain pictures of Spider-Man, to J. Jonah Jameson's disdain. Brock also makes a brief appearance in the film's novelization when Peter Parker first meets Jameson.
- Eddie Brock appears in Spider-Man 3 (2007), portrayed by Topher Grace. This version is a freelance photographer, Peter Parker's rival at the Daily Bugle, and in a relationship with Gwen Stacy. After Peter is bonded to an alien symbiote and it negatively influences his behavior, he exposes Brock for falsifying a photograph to incriminate Spider-Man as a criminal to get a staff photographer job at the Bugle, resulting in Brock getting fired and blacklisted from every newspaper in New York City. Upon seeing Peter dating Gwen, Brock heads to a church and prays for God to kill Peter before bonding with the symbiote after Peter rejects it and becomes Venom. Now knowing Peter is Spider-Man, Venom finds and allies with Sandman to kill the webslinger before kidnapping Mary Jane Watson to use her as bait for a trap. The New Goblin joins the fray to help Spider-Man, but Venom knocks him off of his glider and attempts to kill Peter with it. However, the New Goblin sacrifices himself to save the webslinger. Peter eventually realizes the symbiote is vulnerable to high-frequency soundwaves and separates it from Brock using steel pipes. Just as Peter throws one of the New Goblin's pumpkin bombs at the symbiote, Brock attempts to rejoin it and is killed along with it.
- In July 2007, a spin-off of Spider-Man 3 following Brock was being developed, with Topher Grace being considered to reprise his role. In September 2008, Paul Wernick and Rhett Reese signed on to write. Marvel Entertainment would have produced the film, but the project was ultimately cancelled. In March 2012, plans for a new solo film emerged. Josh Trank was in talks to direct after Gary Ross left the project.

==== Sony's Spider-Man Universe ====
- In March 2016, Sony hired Dante Harper to write the solo film's script with Avi Arad and Matt Tolmach producing. At the time, the film was not planned to have any connection to the Marvel Cinematic Universe version of Spider-Man. A year later, following the success of Spider-Man's appearances in Captain America: Civil War (2016) and Spider-Man: Homecoming (2017), Sony announced Venom (2018). Scott Rosenberg and Jeff Pinker were hired to write the script and make the film the first in a series of Spider-Man character-related spin-off films called the "Sony Pictures Universe of Marvel Characters", later renamed to Sony's Spider-Man Universe. In May 2017, Tom Hardy signed on to portray Eddie Brock and Ruben Fleischer was set to direct. Additionally, voice actor Brad Venable provides additional voice work for Venom. In June 2017, Amy Pascal claimed that the film would be "adjunct" to the Marvel Cinematic Universe.
- Hardy reprised his role as Brock in Venom: Let There Be Carnage (2021). The film was released on October 1, 2021. After defeating Cletus Kasady / Carnage, Brock and Venom are transported to the Marvel Cinematic Universe in the mid-credits scene, where they witness that universe's J. Jonah Jameson expose Spider-Man's true identity as Peter Parker, as seen in the films Spider-Man: Far From Home (2019) and Spider-Man: No Way Home (2021). In the latter film's mid-credits scene, Eddie and Venom begin to familiarize themselves with the new universe they found themselves in, learning about its heroes and a major event known as the Blip, only to be suddenly taken back to their home universe by Doctor Strange. However, the pair inadvertently leave behind a piece of the symbiote.
- Hardy reprised his role as Brock in Venom: The Last Dance (2024).

=== Video games ===
==== Spider-Man games ====
- Eddie Brock / Venom appears as a boss in the Sega Mega-CD version of Spider-Man vs. The Kingpin.
- Eddie Brock / Venom appears as a playable character in Spider-Man and Venom: Maximum Carnage.
- Eddie Brock / Venom appears as a playable character in Venom/Spider-Man: Separation Anxiety.
- Eddie Brock / Venom appears as a boss in The Amazing Spider-Man: Lethal Foes.
- Eddie Brock / Venom appears as the final boss of Spider-Man (1995).
- Eddie Brock / Venom appears as a boss, later a supporting character, in Spider-Man (2000), voiced by Daran Norris. After being attacked by an impostor Spider-Man, Brock becomes Venom again to exact revenge by kidnapping Spider-Man's wife Mary Jane Watson. When he learns of this, Spider-Man chases Venom through the city and the sewers, eventually defeating him in his lair and saving Mary Jane. After learning Spider-Man was framed, Venom offers to make amends by helping him find the culprit.
- The Ultimate Marvel incarnation of Eddie Brock / Venom appears as a playable character in and the final boss of Ultimate Spider-Man (2005), voiced by Daniel Capallaro and Arthur Burghardt respectively. Brock and Venom are hunted, later captured, by Silver Sable on behalf of Bolivar Trask, who wants to experiment on the symbiote. After escaping and defeating a Carnage symbiote-possessed Spider-Man, Eddie absorbs it from him, gaining complete control over his own symbiote in the process. Though Spider-Man stops him from killing Trask, Venom later escapes and does so anyway while Trask was still in Prison.
- Eddie Brock / Venom appears as the final boss of the Spider-Man 3 film tie-in game, with Topher Grace reprising his role. Similarly to the film, Brock is initially Peter Parker's rival at the Daily Bugle and competes against him when they are both given the same assignment. After being humiliated by Spider-Man and losing a promotion to Parker, Brock vows revenge against both and becomes Venom after Parker rejects the symbiote and it attaches to him. Brock blackmails Sandman into helping him kill Spider-Man, only to be killed.
- Eddie Brock / Venom appears as a playable character in Spider-Man: Friend or Foe, voiced by Quinton Flynn. He and several supervillains fight Spider-Man until they are all attacked by P.H.A.N.T.O.M.s under Mysterio's command. Venom is captured along with the other villains, placed under mind control, and sent to Transylvania to retrieve a meteor shard located there. Spider-Man defeats Venom and destroys the mind-control device before the latter joins forces with the web-slinger to exact revenge on Mysterio.
- Eddie Brock / Venom appears as the final boss of Spider-Man: Web of Shadows, voiced by Keith Szarabajka. He attacks Manhattan with an army of symbiotes, leading to Spider-Man joining forces with S.H.I.E.L.D., the Kingpin, and many others to defeat him. Following several encounters, Spider-Man confronts Venom on S.H.I.E.L.D.'s Helicarrier after the latter takes on a giant, five-headed form. Despite destroying four of the heads, he fails to kill Venom, so he appeals to Brock's better nature. Once he emerges, Spider-Man can choose to kill Venom himself or allow Brock to sacrifice himself to kill Venom.
  - In the PS2 and PSP versions of the game, Venom is captured and brainwashed by the Tinkerer after he attacks Manhattan with his symbiote army and the final boss is a giant symbiote with seven heads that contain Venom's consciousness.
  - In the Nintendo DS version, Venom is not the cause of the invasion. In his efforts to stop it, he allies himself with Spider-Man after he defeats him.
- Eddie Brock / Anti-Venom appears as a boss in Spider-Man: Edge of Time, voiced by Steve Blum. This version is a reformed anti-hero who was brainwashed by several mind control devices implanted by Alchemax scientist Walker Sloan, who intends to change history. After witnessing Anti-Venom kill Spider-Man via Sloan's time portal, Spider-Man 2099 works to prevent this from happening as well as stop Sloan. Though he warns his predecessor about his impending death, the present-day Spider-Man ignores him to save innocents from Anti-Venom's rampage. Just before he dies, the future Spider-Man rescues his predecessor and takes his place in the fight against Anti-Venom; removing his mind control implants in the process. Enraged, Anti-Venom attacks Sloan and inadvertently knocks them and Otto Octavius into Sloan's time portal, fusing them all into the monstrous Atrocity (voiced by Fred Tatasciore), equipped with Octavius' tentacles and Anti-Venom's ability to negate the present-day Spider-Man's powers. Once the Spider-Men defeat Atrocity and the mastermind behind Sloan's plot, they successfully undo all of the scientist's changes to history.
- Eddie Brock / Venom appears in the mobile version of The Amazing Spider-Man 2, voiced again by Benjamin Diskin. Originally a photographer who tricks Spider-Man into fighting crooks, allowing Brock to take pictures of him in action, he later investigates Oscorp, but gets caught, forcing Spider-Man to save him. Upon investigating a second time, Brock discovers the company's illegal activities and is transformed into Venom, who goes on a rampage until Spider-Man defeats him and removes the symbiote. Brock tells him what happened before passing out and Spider-Man takes him to the hospital.
- Eddie Brock as Venom, Anti-Venom, and Toxin appears as a playable character and boss in Spider-Man Unlimited (2014).

==== Other games ====
- Eddie Brock / Venom appears as a playable character in Marvel vs. Capcom: Clash of Super Heroes.
- Eddie Brock / Venom appears as a playable character in Marvel vs. Capcom 2: New Age of Heroes, voiced by Rod Wilson.
- Eddie Brock / Venom appears as a playable character in Marvel Nemesis: Rise of the Imperfects, voiced by Jason Bryden.
- Eddie Brock / Venom appears in the Xbox 360 version of Marvel: Ultimate Alliance, voiced by Steve Blum. He appears via the "Villains Pack" DLC. Additionally, his Ultimate Marvel design appears as an alternate skin.
- Eddie Brock / Venom appears in LittleBigPlanet via the "Marvel Costume Kit 3" DLC.
- Eddie Brock / Venom appears as an alternate skin for Mac Gargan's incarnation in the PS3, Xbox 360, PS4, Xbox One, and PC versions of Marvel: Ultimate Alliance 2.
- Eddie Brock as Venom and Anti-Venom appear as playable characters in Marvel Super Hero Squad Online.
- Eddie Brock / Anti-Venom appears in Marvel Avengers Alliance.
- Eddie Brock / Venom appears as a playable character in Marvel Avengers: Battle for Earth, voiced by Roger Craig Smith.
- Eddie Brock / Venom appears as a playable character in Marvel Heroes, voiced by Neil Kaplan. Additionally, Brock's Anti-Venom and Toxin forms appear as alternate skins.
- Eddie Brock / Venom appears as a playable character in Marvel Puzzle Quest.
- Eddie Brock / Venom appears as a playable character and boss in Lego Marvel Super Heroes, voiced by Dave Boat.
- Eddie Brock / Venom appears as a playable character in Disney Infinity 2.0, voiced by Matt Lanter.
- Eddie Brock / Venom appears as a playable character and occasional boss in Marvel Contest of Champions.
- Eddie Brock / Venom appears as a playable character in Marvel: Future Fight.
- Eddie Brock / Venom appears as a playable character in Disney Infinity 3.0, voiced again by Matt Lanter.
- Eddie Brock / Venom appears as a playable character in Marvel Avengers Academy, voiced by Brian Stivale.
- Eddie Brock / Venom appears as a downloadable playable character in Marvel vs. Capcom: Infinite, voiced by Andrew Morgado.
- Eddie Brock / Venom appears in Lego Marvel Super Heroes 2. Spider-Man, Ms. Marvel, She-Hulk, Spider-Gwen, and Spider-Man 2099 break into Alchemax, but are attacked by scientists infected by Venom and Carnage's symbiotes. Later, Green Goblin 2099 uses a shard of the Nexus of All Realities to fuse Venom and Carnage into a new creature he can control that Spider-Man dubs "Carnom". Carnom is defeated by the heroes, who free him from the Goblin's control. As the heroes claim the shard, Carnom pursues Goblin 2099 in retaliation for his abuse. Carnom is also available as a playable character.
- Eddie Brock / Venom appears as a boss and playable character in Marvel Ultimate Alliance 3: The Black Order, voiced again by Steve Blum. After being broken out of the Raft, Venom joins the Sinister Six and fights a group of heroes alongside Electro. After being defeated, Spider-Man persuades Venom to join the heroes' side and help save the universe, though Venom maintains his animosity towards him.
- Eddie Brock / Venom appears in Marvel's Midnight Suns, voiced by Jake Green and Darin De Paul respectively. He initially appears in the main game as one of Lilith's Fallen before becoming a downloadable playable character via the "Redemption" DLC.
- Eddie Brock / Venom appears as a playable character in Marvel Rivals.
- Eddie Brock / Venom appears as a playable character in Marvel Cosmic Invasion.
- Eddie Brock / Venom appears as a playable character in Marvel Tōkon: Fighting Souls.

=== Miscellaneous ===
- Eddie Brock / Venom appears in The Ultimate Spider-Man short story collection book as part of the short story "An Evening in the Bronx with Venom", by Keith R.A. DeCandido.
- Eddie Brock / Venom appears in the Adi Shankar's Bootleg Universe fan film Truth In Journalism, portrayed by Ryan Kwanten. This version is a disturbed and disgraced investigative journalist obsessed with redeeming his public image, indifferent to the suffering of others. Additionally, he takes inspiration from Man Bites Dog's Ben (portrayed by Benoît Poelvoorde).

== Collected editions ==
=== Venomverse ===
Title	Material collected	Published date	ISBN
Venomverse	Venomverse #1–5	January 9, 2018	978-1302909345
Venomized	Venomized #1–5	July 24, 2018	978-1302911690
Extreme Venomverse	Extreme Venomverse #1–5	October 17, 2023	978-1302952181
Death of the Venomverse	Death of the Venomverse #1–5	December 19, 2023	978-1302951993
Venomverse Reborn	Venomverse Reborn #1–4	October 29, 2024	978-1302960414
Spider-Verse vs. Venomverse	Spider-Verse vs. Venomverse #1–5	January 13, 2026	978-1302961558

=== Eddie Brock: Carnage ===
Title	Material collected	Publication date	ISBN
Vol. 1: Killing Me	Eddie Brock: Carnage #1–5	October 7, 2025	978-1302962760
Vol. 2: The Killing Muse	Eddie Brock: Carnage #6–10	March 17, 2026	978-1302962777
