= The Spectacular Spider-Man =

Comic book series

- Cover to The Spectacular Spider-Man #1 (July 1968) by Harry Rosenbaum

Publication information
- Publisher: Marvel Comics
- Schedule: Monthly
- Format: Standard
- Genre: Superhero
- Publication date: List: magazine: July 1968 – November 1968 (vol. 1): December 1976 – December 1987 (as Peter Parker, the Spectacular Spider-Man) January 1988 – November 1998 (as The Spectacular Spider-Man) (vol. 2): September 2003 – June 2005 (vol. 3): June 2017 — December 2018 (as Peter Parker: The Spectacular Spider-Man)
- No. of issues: List: magazine: 2 (vol. 1): 264 (#1–263, plus −1) and 14 Annuals (vol. 2): 27 (vol. 3): 23 (#1–6 and 297–313) and 1 Annual

Creative team
- Written by: List: Gerry Conway #1–3, 6 (reprint), 137–174, Annual #8–10 Archie Goodwin #4–5, 7–8, 12 Bill Mantlo #6 (new material), 9–10, 12–15, 17–34, 36–40, 42, 53, 61–89, 104, 120, Annual #1, 4 Roger Stern #43, 45–52, 54–61, 85, 259–261 Al Milgrom #90–100 Cary Burkett #101–102 Peter David #103, 105–113, 115–119, 121–123, 128–129, 134–136, Annual #5–6 Roger McKenzie #124 J. M. DeMatteis #131–132, 178–203, 217, 223, 241–258, −1, Annual #13–14 Steven Grant #204–210 Tom DeFalco #41, 215–229, 254–255 Todd DeZago #216, 218–219, 228, 230–240 Paul Jenkins (vol. 2) #1–22, 27 Samm Barnes (vol. 2) #23–26 Chip Zdarsky (vol. 3) #1–6, Annual #1, #297–310 Sean Ryan #311–313
- Penciller: List: Sal Buscema Ross Andru Jim Mooney Mike Zeck Frank Miller Lee Elias John Romita Jr. Rich Buckler Bernie Wrightson Humberto Ramos Damion Scott Adam Kubert
- Inker: List: Mike Esposito Ernie Chan Frank Springer Wayne Faucher Robert Campanella

The Spectacular Spider-Man is a comic book and magazine series starring Spider-Man and published by Marvel Comics.

Following the success of Spider-Man's original series, The Amazing Spider-Man, Marvel felt the character could support more than one title. This led the company in 1968 to launch a short-lived magazine, the first to bear the Spectacular name. In 1972, Marvel more successfully launched a second Spider-Man ongoing series, Marvel Team-Up, in which he was paired with other Marvel heroes. A third monthly ongoing series, Peter Parker, The Spectacular Spider-Man, debuted in 1976.

== Magazine (1968) ==
The Spectacular Spider-Man was initially a two-issue magazine published by Marvel in 1968, as an experiment in entering the black-and-white comic-magazine market successfully pioneered by Warren Publishing and others. It sold for 35 cents when standard comic books cost 12 cents and Annuals and Giants 25 cents. It represented the first Spider-Man spin-off publication aside from the original series' summer Annuals, begun in 1964.

The first issue (cover-dated July 1968) featured a painted, color cover by men's adventure-magazine artist Harry Rosenbaum, in acrylic paint on illustration board, over layouts by The Amazing Spider-Man artist John Romita Sr. The 52-page black-and-white Spider-Man story, "Lo, This Monster!", was by writer Stan Lee, penciler Romita Sr. and inker Jim Mooney. A 10-page origin story, "In The Beginning!", was by Lee, penciler Larry Lieber and inker Bill Everett.

The feature story was reprinted in color, with some small alterations and bridging material by Gerry Conway, in The Amazing Spider-Man #116–118 (Jan.–March 1973) as "Suddenly...the Smasher!", "The Deadly Designs of the Disruptor!", and "Countdown to Chaos!" (with additional inking by Tony Mortellaro on the latter two). These versions were themselves reprinted in Marvel Tales #95–97 (Sept.-Oct. 1978).

The second and final issue (Nov. 1968) also sported a painted cover and the interior was in color as well. Lee, Romita and Mooney again collaborated on its single story, "The Goblin Lives!", featuring the Green Goblin. A next-issue box at the end promoted the planned contents of the unrealized issue #3, "The Mystery of the TV Terror". A version of the Goblin story, trimmed by 18 pages, was reprinted in The Amazing Spider-Man Annual #9 (1973), and portions of the "TV Terror" costume were reused for the costume of the Prowler.

Both issues of the magazine were reprinted in their entirety (albeit reduced to comic size) in the collection Marvel Masterworks: The Amazing Spider-Man #7 (ISBN 0-7851-1636-2), then again in Marvel Epic Collections: The Amazing Spider-Man #4 in 2019. The first issue was reprinted again in 2002 as The Spectacular Spider-Man Facsimile, exactly as it was originally presented.

== Volume 1 (1976–1998) ==
Cover of Peter Parker, the Spectacular Spider-Man #1 (December 1976) by Sal Buscema

Titled Peter Parker, the Spectacular Spider-Man on its December 1976 debut, and shortened to simply The Spectacular Spider-Man with #134 (Jan. 1988), this was the second Amazing Spider-Man monthly comic-book spin-off series, after Marvel Team-Up, which also featured Spider-Man. The monthly title ran 264 issues (including a #−1 issue) and 14 Annuals until November 1998.

The series was launched by writer/editor Gerry Conway and artist Sal Buscema and Mike Esposito. Conway explained the concept and origin of the series:

[Spectacular Spider-Man] was in response to the fact that I had a deal to script several ongoing [series] for Marvel at the time. Stan [Lee] wanted me back on Spider-Man, in particular, but I didn't want to take Amazing Spider-Man from Len Wein, who was by this time the regular writer, so Stan saw it as an opportunity to launch a second Spider-Man title, which was something he'd wanted to do for a while. ... the full, original title was "Peter Parker, the Spectacular Spider-Man." The notion was we'd focus more on the supporting characters and Peter's social life, but before we could really develop that I left Marvel again, not long after that.

Buscema drew the title until mid-1978. After Buscema's departure, a succession of artists (including Mike Zeck, Jim Mooney, Ed Hannigan, Marie Severin and Greg LaRocque) penciled the series for approximately five years. Frank Miller, who would later become the artist on Daredevil, first drew the character in Peter Parker, the Spectacular Spider-Man #27. Scripting initially alternated between Conway and Archie Goodwin until mid-1977, when Bill Mantlo took over. During this era of Spectacular, the stories focused more on Parker's campus life as an undergraduate student/teacher's assistant at Empire State University and giving more attention to his colleagues than to the more long-running supporting characters in Amazing. Mantlo's first run on the title featured frequent appearances by the White Tiger, Marvel's first Hispanic superhero, and the first appearance of the supervillain Carrion. He used the series to wrap up unresolved plot elements from The Champions comic book series and concluded his first run with a crossover with Fantastic Four #218 (May 1980). In a notable two-part story scripted by Mantlo and published in The Spectacular Spider-Man #39-40 (February–March 1980), Spider-Man was temporarily transformed into "The Spider-Lizard," a rampaging creature akin to Spider-Man's recurring foe Lizard.

Mantlo was succeeded by Roger Stern, who wrote The Spectacular Spider-Man from #43 (June 1980) to 61 (December 1981). When Stern departed to write for The Amazing Spider-Man, Mantlo returned to scripting Peter Parker, the Spectacular Spider-Man; Mantlo's second tenure at the title lasted until April 1984. Mantlo's second run introduced the superhero duo Cloak and Dagger, created by Mantlo and Hannigan in Peter Parker, the Spectacular Spider-Man #64 (March 1982), and included a story arc which took place from issues #73–79 (Dec. 1982 – June 1983), in which Doctor Octopus and the Owl competed for control of the New York underworld. Doctor Octopus almost destroys New York with a nuclear device, and Black Cat is critically injured. Issue #86 (January 1984) was part of the "Assistant Editors Month" event and featured a story drawn by Fred Hembeck.

Al Milgrom took over scripting as well as art on the title with issue #90 (May 1984) and worked on it through issue #100 (March 1985). Milgrom imbued the book with a more whimsical tone, for example, pitting Spider-Man against the Spot, a supervillain who was so ridiculous that he gave Spider-Man fits of laughter. Jim Owsley, then-editor of the Spider-Man books, disapproved of this approach and had Milgrom replaced as writer by newcomer Peter David in 1985. David and artist Rich Buckler, said Owsley, had the series "focusing on stories with a serious, 'grown-up' tone and more complex themes". The most notable story arc of the David/Buckler era is "The Death of Jean DeWolff" (#107–110 (Oct. 1985–Jan. 1986)), in which Spider-Man's ally, NYC Police Captain Jean DeWolff – a supporting character in the Spider-Man comics since 1976 – is murdered by the vigilante/serial killer the Sin-Eater. This multi-part story guest-starred Daredevil. The storyline "Kraven's Last Hunt" by writer J.M. DeMatteis and artists Mike Zeck and Bob McLeod crossed over into Peter Parker, the Spectacular Spider-Man #131 and 132.

With issue #134 (Jan. 1988), the "Peter Parker" part of the title was removed and the series became simply The Spectacular Spider-Man. The logo changed from a distinctive design to using the same design as that of The Amazing Spider-Man and the 1968 Spectacular Spider-Man magazine; this logo did not change until issue #218 (Nov. 1994). The logo of Web of Spider-Man was also changed in 1988 to match that of The Amazing Spider-Man, prompting Owsley to later reflect, "Suddenly, the three books that I had worked for years to give unique identities to were homogenized into a blur of Spider Sameness: same logo style, same basic look, indistinguishable from one another." Sal Buscema returned as the regular artist, staying with the title from early 1988 to late 1996; throughout the series' run, Buscema drew over 100 issues, making him by far the series' most frequent contributor.

After his story arc "Return of the Sin-Eater" (#134–136 (Jan.–March 1988)), Peter David was removed as writer. Editor Owsley said editor-in-chief Jim Shooter "disliked Peter's work intensely". David, in a 2005 interview, believed, "I was fired off Spider-Man because it was felt at the upper editorial level that a novice comic-book writer shouldn't be handling the adventures of Marvel's flagship character". Former series writer Gerry Conway, who additionally wrote Web of Spider-Man from 1988 to 1990, returned to Spectacular, after which he left both books to become a story editor on the TV series Father Dowling Mysteries. Conway stated in 1991 that "I understand the character a lot better now than I did when I was nineteen. And one of the nice things about the Marvel characters is that you can keep them fresh by changing them just a bit." His 1988–1991 run on Spectacular included such story arcs as the "Lobo Brothers Gang War", and the conflict between Daily Bugle editor Joe Robertson and his former friend, the albino criminal Tombstone. He used his joint duty as Web of Spider-Man writer to tie together storylines in the two separate titles and strengthen the continuity between them. Throughout their run, Conway and Buscema collaborated using the Marvel method, occasionally working out details of the plot over the phone.

J. M. DeMatteis became the regular writer in mid-1991, injecting a grim, psychological tone into the series. DeMatteis began his run with the story arc "The Child Within" (#178–184 (July 1991–Jan. 1992)), featuring the return of the Harry Osborn version of the Green Goblin. As written by DeMatteis, Harry sank further into insanity and gained the same super-strength possessed by his father, battling Spider-Man again in #189 (June 1992), before being killed in #200 (May 1993). In an undated 2000s interview, DeMatteis said, "I really loved the two years on Spectacular Spider-Man that I wrote with Sal Buscema drawing. Talk about underrated! Sal is one of the best storytellers and a wonderful collaborator. I loved that run." During this period, Spider-Man editor Danny Fingeroth would hold conferences in New York with all the Spider-Man creative staff, allowing them to brainstorm ideas and discuss future storylines.

DeMatteis left the book in mid-1993 to write The Amazing Spider-Man (succeeding David Michelinie who wrote Amazing for over half a decade.) Steven Grant had a brief run before the book was set adrift with a succession of fill-in issues which ran through late 1994, when former Amazing Spider-Man writer Tom DeFalco took over. By this time, all the Spider-books were being affected by the controversial "Clone Saga" that culminated with Spectacular Spider-Man #226 (July 1995), and Fingeroth convinced DeFalco that the series needed a regular writer to help guide the crossover story. This story revealed (though it was later reversed) that the Spider-Man who had appeared in the previous 20 years of comics was a clone of the real Spider-Man. This tied into a publishing gap after #229 (Oct. 1995), when the title was temporarily replaced by The Spectacular Scarlet Spider #1–2 (Nov.–Dec. 1995), featuring the "original" Peter Parker. The series picked up again with #230 (Jan. 1996). Initially, newcomer Todd Dezago wrote the scripts for DeFalco's plots, since DeFalco was already writing two other series and wanted to groom DeZago to be the long-term writer on Spectacular Spider-Man.

Todd Dezago then wrote for a year before DeMatteis returned through May 1998. DeMatteis later commented, "We did some nice stories, like the one about Flash Thompson's childhood. But, in general, I don't hold that last run...very dear to my heart." Luke Ross succeeded Sal Buscema as the artist and remained until the series ended, but there was no regular writer for the last half-year with Glenn Greenberg, Roger Stern, John Byrne and Howard Mackie all contributing during this time. The final issue was #263 (Nov. 1998).

== Volume 2 (2003–2005) ==
Spectacular Spider-Man (vol. 2) titled without the definite article "The", is a 27-issue monthly series published from September 2003 to June 2005. Each issue was written by Paul Jenkins (except #23–26, by Samm Barnes). The book's primary pencillers were Humberto Ramos and Mark Buckingham, with Damion Scott drawing a three-issue arc titled "The Lizard's Tail".

The series features a tie-in to the storyline Avengers Disassembled. Spider-Man encounters a new enemy called the Queen who wants him as her mate. Her kiss causes him to slowly mutate into a giant spider who metamorphoses into human form with enhanced strength and agility, along with organic webbing and a psychic link with insects and arachnids.

This comic also includes the sequel to "Sins Past", "Sins Remembered", in which Peter travels to Paris to meet Sarah Stacy and resolves the issues between them.

== Spectacular Spider-Man Adventures ==
Spectacular Spider-Man Adventures was a title published by Panini Comics in the United Kingdom from November 1995 to September 2005, although the Adventures portion of the title was often dropped from the cover page. It featured a mix of reprinted American material, as well as originally produced British material, including a guest appearance from Captain Britain. Spectacular was aimed at a younger audience than Panini's other Spider-Man reprint title Astonishing Spider-Man, and was loosely based on the continuity of the 1990s animated series.

== Volume 3 (2017–18) ==
Peter Parker: The Spectacular Spider-Man (vol. 3) was published from June 2017 to December 2018. After the first six issues, the series reverted to legacy numbering with issue #297 as part of the line-wide Marvel Legacy relaunch. The series' original creative team had Chip Zdarsky as writer, with Adam Kubert providing the artwork. Notable recurring characters included Teresa Parker, J. Jonah Jameson, Johnny Storm, and original character Rebecca London.

Various issues, as well as the one Annual, were illustrated by guest artists; Kubert's final issue as artist was #307, excluding covers. Zdarsky left the series with issue #310. The series ended with issue #313, the final three issues being a tie-in to the Spider-Geddon crossover event written by Sean Ryan.

== The Spectacular Spider-Men ==
The Spectacular Spider-Men was an ongoing series that was published beginning March 2024, and ending in May 2025, after it was cancelled after fifteen issues. The series was written by Greg Weisman (who also created The Spectacular Spider-Man television series) with Ramos returning for art. The Spectacular Spider-Men stars Peter Parker and Miles Morales and focuses on the relationship between the two Spider-Men. The series' supporting cast featured characters who previously appeared in the television series and Weisman's Starbrand & Nightmask comic series, including Kenny Kong, Shelly Conklin, Cedric Harrison, Sha Shan Nguyen, and Professor Raymond Warren.

== Collected editions ==
- Essential Peter Parker, the Spectacular Spider-Man
  - Volume 1 collects issues #1–31, 568 pages, May 2005, ISBN 978-0785116820
  - Volume 2 collects issues #32–53, Annual #1–2, 592 pages, February 2006, ISBN 978-0785120421
  - Volume 3 collects issues #54–74, Annual #3, 536 pages, March 2007, ISBN 978-0785125013
  - Volume 4 collects issues #75–96, Annual #4, 576 pages, August 2009, ISBN 978-0785130710
  - Volume 5 collects issues #97–114, Annual #5, 576 pages, July 2011, ISBN 978-0785157557
- Spider-Man: The Original Clone Saga includes #25–31, 149, 162–163, Annual #8, 496 pages, July 2011, ISBN 978-0785155232
- Spider-Man by Roger Stern Omnibus includes #43–61, 85, Annual #3, 1296 pages, April 2014, ISBN 978-0785188278
- Spider-Man: Origin of the Hobgoblin
  - First printing includes #85, 160 pages, May 1993, ISBN 978-0871359179
  - Second printing includes #43, 47–48, 85, 256 pages, December 2011, ISBN 978-0785158547
- Spider-Man: The Complete Alien Costume Saga
  - Book 1 includes #90–95, 488 pages, August 2014, ISBN 978-0785188674
  - Book 2 includes #96–100, Annual #4, 504 pages, May 2015, ISBN 978-0785190035
- Life in the Mad Dog Ward – includes #133, 144 pages, November 2013, ISBN 978-0785185031
- Tombstone – includes #137–150, 368 pages, June 2016, ISBN 978-1302900649
- The Amazing Spider-Man: The Death of Jean DeWolff
  - First printing collects #107–110, 96 pages, April 1991, ISBN 978-0871357045
  - Second printing collects #107–110, 134–136, 168 pages, March 2013, ISBN 978-0785167143
- Secret Wars II Omnibus includes Peter Parker, the Spectacular Spider-Man #111, 1,184 pages, May 2009, ISBN 978-0785131113
- Spider-Man vs. Silver Sable Vol. 1 includes #128–129, 144 pages, January 2006, ISBN 978-0785118824
- The Amazing Spider-Man – Fearful Symmetry: Kraven's Last Hunt includes #131–132, 164 pages, December 1991, ISBN 978-0871355522
- The Evolutionary War Omnibus includes Spectacular Spider-Man Annual #8, 472 pages, September 2011, ISBN 978-0785155478
- Atlantis Attacks Omnibus includes Spectacular Spider-Man Annual #9, 552 pages, March 2011, ISBN 978-0785144922
- Spider-Man: The Cosmic Adventures includes #158–160, 192 pages, March 1993, ISBN 978-0871359636
- Acts of Vengeance Omnibus includes #158–160, 744 pages, March 2011, ISBN 978-0785144649
- Spider-Man: Son of the Goblin includes Spectacular Spider-Man #189 and 200, 144 pages, July 2004, ISBN 978-0785115632
- Maximum Carnage includes Spectacular Spider-Man #201–203, 336 pages, December 2006, ISBN 978-0785109877
- Spider-Man Epic Collection Vol. 26 Lifetheft includes Spectacular Spider-Man #211, 496 pages, November 16, 2021, 978-1302930691
- Spider-Man and the New Warriors: Hero Killers includes Spectacular Spider-Man Annual #12, 232 pages, March 2012, ISBN 978-0785159674
- Spider-Man: The Complete Clone Saga Epic
  - Book 1 includes Spectacular Spider-Man #217, 424 pages, April 2010, ISBN 978-0785144625
  - Book 2 includes Spectacular Spider-Man #218–221, 480 pages, June 2010, ISBN 978-0785143512
  - Book 3 includes Spectacular Spider-Man #222–224, 464 pages, September 2010, ISBN 978-0785149545
  - Book 4 includes Spectacular Spider-Man #225–227, 480 pages, December 2010, ISBN 978-0785149552
  - Book 5 includes Spectacular Spider-Man #228–229 and Spectacular Spider-Man Super Special #1, 472 pages, February 2011, ISBN 978-0785150091
- Spider-Man: The Complete Ben Reilly Epic
  - Book 2 includes Spectacular Spider-Man #230, 424 pages, November 2011, ISBN 978-0785156123
  - Book 3 includes Spectacular Spider-Man #231–233, 432 pages, January 2012, ISBN 978-0785156130
  - Book 4 includes Spectacular Spider-Man #234, 464 pages, April 2012, ISBN 978-0785161318
  - Book 5 includes Spectacular Spider-Man #235–239, 464 pages, July 2012, ISBN 978-0785163831
  - Book 6 includes Spectacular Spider-Man #240–241, 448 pages, November 2012, ISBN 978-0785165521
- Spider-Man: Revelations includes Spectacular Spider-Man #240, 112 pages, October 1997, ISBN 978-0785105602
- Spider-Man: Spider-Hunt includes Spectacular Spider-Man #254–256, 272 pages, June 2012, ISBN 978-0785160519
- Spider-Man: Identity Crisis includes Spectacular Spider-Man #257–258, 200 pages, May 2012, ISBN 978-0785159704
- Spider-Man: Hobgoblin Lives includes Spectacular Spider-Man #259–261, 184 pages, May 2011, ISBN 978-0785155126
- Spider-Man: The Gathering of Five includes Spectacular Spider-Man #262–263, 248 pages, January 2014, ISBN 0-7851-8529-1
- The Spectacular Spider-Man
  - Vol. 1: The Hunger collects The Spectacular Spider-Man (vol. 2) #1–5, 120 pages, December 2003, ISBN 978-0785111696
  - Vol. 2: Countdown collects The Spectacular Spider-Man (vol. 2) #6–10, 120 pages, May 2004, ISBN 978-0785113133
  - Vol. 3: Here There Be Monsters collects The Spectacular Spider-Man (vol. 2) #11–14, 144 pages, October 2004, ISBN 978-0785113331
  - Vol. 4: Disassembled collects The Spectacular Spider-Man (vol. 2) #15–20, 136 pages, December 2004, ISBN 978-0785116264
  - Vol. 5: Sins Remembered collects The Spectacular Spider-Man (vol. 2) #23–26, 96 pages, May 2005, ISBN 978-0785116288
  - Vol. 6: The Final Curtain collects The Spectacular Spider-Man (vol. 2) #21–22 and 27, 144 pages, October 2005, ISBN 978-0785119500
- Peter Parker: The Spectacular Spider-Man
  - Vol 1: Into The Twilight collects Peter Parker: The Spectacular Spider-Man (vol. 3) #1–6 and material from Free Comic Book Day 2017 (Secret Empire) #1, 144 pages, December 2017, ISBN 978-1302907563
  - Vol 2: Most Wanted collects Peter Parker: The Spectacular Spider-Man #297–300, 112 pages, April 2018, ISBN 978-1302907570
  - Vol 3: Amazing Fantasy collects Peter Parker: The Spectacular Spider-Man #301–303 and Annual #1, 112 pages, August 2018, ISBN 978-1302911188
  - Vol 4: Coming Home collects Peter Parker: The Spectacular Spider-Man #304–310, 112 pages, December 2018, ISBN 978-1302911195
  - Vol 5: Spider-Geddon collects Peter Parker: The Spectacular Spider-Man #311–313, Spider-Geddon: Spider-Man Noir Video Comic #1 and Spider-Geddon: Animated Video Comic #1, 112 pages, February 2019, ISBN 978-1302914530
  - Spider-Man by Chip Zdarsky Omnibus collects Peter Parker: The Spectacular Spider-Man (vol. 3) #1-6, #297-310, Annual #1, Spider-Man: Life Story #1-6, Annual #1, and Spider-Man: Spider’s Shadow #1-6, 936 pages, December 2023, ISBN 978-1302952983
- Spectacular Spider-Man Omnibus Volume 1 collects Spectacular Spider-Man (1976) #1-42, Annual #1, Amazing Spider-Man Annual (1964) #13, And Fantastic Four (1961) #218, 928 pages, November 2022, ISBN 978-1302947408

== See also ==
- List of Spider-Man titles
- Peter Parker: Spider-Man
- The Spectacular Spider-Man (TV series)
