= Wraith (Brian DeWolff) =

Marvel Comics character

Publication information
- Publisher: Marvel Comics
- First appearance: Marvel Team-Up #48 (August 1976)
- Created by: Bill Mantlo; Sal Buscema

In-story information
- Alter ego: Brian DeWolff
- Species: Human
- Team affiliations: New York City Police Department (formerly)
- Partnerships: Phillip DeWolff
- Abilities: Telepathy; Illusion generation Mental bolts Mind control Skilled combatant Carries a smoke gun

Wraith (Brian DeWolff) is a character appearing in American comic books published by Marvel Comics.

== Publication history ==
Wraith first appeared in Marvel Team-Up #48 (August 1976), and was created by Bill Mantlo and Sal Buscema.

== Fictional character biography ==
Brian DeWolff is a former patrolman for the New York Police Department who is shot by criminals and rescued by his father, ex-Commissioner Phillip DeWolff. Determined to see his son, who was rendered catatonic, survive, Phillip resorts to using experimental technologies to restore Brian's health. During the restoration process, both Brian and Phillip are accidentally exposed to the machinery's ray; this process gives Brian psionic abilities, including the ability to read minds, induce illusions in the minds of others, project psionic force bolts and control the mind of another person. However, he is mentally linked with his father and left susceptible to his control. Under Phillip's control, Brian (as the Wraith) operates as a vigilante, killing both several criminals and innocent civilians by his father's decree. He battles Spider-Man, Iron Man, Doctor Strange, and his sister Jean DeWolff until he is defeated by Spider-Man and Iron Man.

After being put on trial, Brian falls under Phillip's control, but Phillip is defeated by Doctor Strange and Iron Man. Strange revives Brian's consciousness and he is reunited with his sister Jean. Once overpowered and the true circumstances revealed, Brian regains his free will and is found innocent while his father is imprisoned. The Wraith becomes a costumed adventurer and joins with Iron Man, Jean, and others in battling Midas.

When his sister Jean is killed by the Sin-Eater, Brian is driven mad with grief and attempts to take vengeance on the New York Police Department. When he arrives at a police station, he is shot and killed by the Scourge of the Underworld.

Wraith is among the seventeen criminals murdered by the Scourge who are resurrected by Hood using the power of Dormammu as part of a squad assembled to eliminate the Punisher. While the Wraith is scouting the city, the Punisher kills him by shooting him in the chest with an arrow.

== Powers and abilities ==
Wraith possesses a variety of psionic powers as an effect of energy from advanced technology procured by Phillip DeWolff. The Wraith had the psionic ability to control the mind of one other person at a time. He had the ability to cast illusions indiscernible from reality in the minds of one or more people simultaneously, thereby making reality appear to change or making himself seem invisible. He also had the psionic ability to induce mental pain in others equivalent to the physical pain which would be caused by what they were perceiving without causing physical injury, the telepathic ability to read minds, and the psionic ability to affect Spider-Man's mind in such a way as to shield himself from detection by the latter's "spider-sense". He also carried a smoke pistol of unknown origin. Brian has received police training in armed and unarmed combat.
