= Sin-Eater (character) =

- The Sin-Eater, on the cover of The Amazing Spider-Man vol. 5, #45 (May 2020). Art by Josemaria Casanovas.

Publication information
- Publisher: Marvel Comics
- First appearance: Peter Parker, The Spectacular Spider-Man #107 (October 1985)
- Created by: Peter David (writer); Rich Buckler (artist)

In-story information
- Alter ego: Stanley Carter
- Species: Human
- Team affiliations: S.H.I.E.L.D. New York City Police Department; Sinful Six
- Abilities: Expert hand-to-hand combatant Skilled marksman Enhanced physical condition Wields a special gun

Sin-Eater is a name given to several characters appearing in American comic books published by Marvel Comics. The character usually appears in comics featuring Spider-Man and Ghost Rider.

== Publication history ==
The character was introduced in Peter Parker, the Spectacular Spider-Man #107 (October 1985).

== Spider-Man-related fictional character biographies ==
=== Stanley Carter ===
Stanley "Stan" Carter was born in Fort Meade, Maryland. He was an agent of S.H.I.E.L.D. working in research and development. Carter was injected with experimental drugs to increase strength and endurance, but when the program was designated too dangerous it was discontinued. Carter became violent and resigned from S.H.I.E.L.D., eventually becoming a detective with the New York City Police Department. After his partner was killed by criminals, Carter became obsessed with killing anyone who "sinned" by abusing authority, with his first victim being Jean DeWolff.

After being beaten by Spider-Man, Carter is put in psychological and medical care, but is crippled by the beating Spider-Man inflicted. S.H.I.E.L.D. purges all the drugs from his system, but he still has visions of his Sin-Eater persona. After Carter is released, he returns the favor Spider-Man did him by rescuing the latter from an angry mob, and begins writing a memoir of his career as the Sin-Eater. However, he has trouble readjusting to society. Finally he snaps, taking an empty shotgun and goading police officers into opening fire on him. Carter is killed, though finally freed from the Sin-Eater persona's control.

Long after his death, Sin-Eater is resurrected as part of Kindred's plot against Spider-Man. Using his gun, Sin-Eater cleanses the sins of Norman Osborn, which pushes Osborn to attempt to atone for his past actions.

=== Emil Gregg ===
The public revelation of Stanley Carter as Sin-Eater by Peter Parker was responsible for the ruin of Eddie Brock's journalistic career. Brock previously published a series of articles on Sin-Eater in the Daily Globe based on interviews with Emil Gregg, Carter's delusional neighbor, who claimed to be Sin-Eater. This led to Brock's hatred of Peter and eventually to the former's joining with the Venom symbiote.

During the "AXIS" storyline, a new and supernatural Sin-Eater emerges to terrorize New York City, gunning down members of the press. Cletus Kasady (whose morality had been altered by a spell cast by Doctor Doom and the Scarlet Witch) comes into conflict with Sin-Eater when he stops him from murdering reporter Alice Gleason. Sin-Eater later manages to track down and abduct Gleason, taking her to his lair and implying that he is an undead version of Emil Gregg. Before Sin-Eater can harm Gleason, she is rescued by Kasady, who allows Sin-Eater to absorb all of his repressed evil. Overwhelmed by Kasady's sins, Sin-Eater explodes.

=== Michael G. Engelschwert ===
A Sin-Eater copycat killer appears in the Venom: Sinner Takes All mini-series. Michael Engelschwert, a mentally unstable veteran of the Gulf War, bunked in a homeless shelter next to the Sin-Eater copycat Emil Gregg. Gregg's ramblings drive Engelschwert to emulate the Sin-Eater delusions. He appears on the steps of a courthouse wielding a shotgun and kills several people, while injuring Anne Weying, the ex-wife of the Eddie Brock. He breaks into a hospital to finish Weying off, only to find that Venom has set himself up as her protector. Despite his lack of super-powers, Engelschwert remains two steps ahead of Venom and the police as he continues his killing spree. He is finally stopped when another psychopath shoots him in the back. Realizing the wound is fatal, Engelschwert sets off a bomb strapped to his chest.

== Powers and abilities ==
The first version had an artificially heightened physicality, similar to that of Captain America. Though his strength, agility, stamina and reflexes was greater than that of any Olympic athlete, it did not exceed the hypothetical natural limitations of the human body and would not be considered truly superhuman. The same clandestine experiments that heightened his physique probably also drove him insane. He had also undergone military training, though it was rendered less effective by his insanity. He is an expert hand-to-hand combatant and skilled marksman, with his signature weapon being a double-barreled shotgun. After being revived by Kindred, Sin-Eater begins using a special gun which removes any superhuman's powers and destroys their sins.

The second version was able to detect the evil within others, and of absorbing a green energy which he claims is all of their sins after killing them. He is also unaffected by being repeatedly shot with a handgun and regrows his own head (which is merely a skull) after it is destroyed by Carnage.

The third version wielded a heavy assortment of guns, bombs, knives, and rocket launchers, and wore a bulletproof costume.

== Ghost Rider-related fictional character biographies ==
=== Ethan Domblue ===
An earlier character named Sin-Eater first appeared in Ghost Rider #80. Ethan Domblue was a pastor obsessed with having a sinless congregation. Ghost Rider foe Centurious gave Ethan the power to "eat" his congregation's sins, leaving them in a passive, "sinless" state. He did not realize that by placing his parishioners' souls in the Crystal of Souls, he was creating an army of zombie-like slaves loyal to Centurious. Eventually, Ghost Rider (Johnny Blaze) defeated Centurious and freed the souls in the Crystal. As a last redemptive act, Ethan Domblue freed Blaze from Zarathos's possession.

=== Reverend Styge ===
The Dan Ketch Ghost Rider also had a foe that was referred to as the Sin-Eater. Jim Sharp aka Reverend Styge, a cannibal under service of Centurious was granted power by Chthon to raise the dead by eating the living.

== Reception ==
In 2022, Screen Rant ranked Sin-Eater 4th in their "10 Most Powerful Silk Villains In Marvel Comics" list.

== In other media ==
- Stan Carter appears in The Spectacular Spider-Man, voiced by Thomas F. Wilson. This version is a uniformed police sergeant partnered with Officer Jean DeWolff who supports Spider-Man's activities as opposed to his partner.
- Stanley Carter appears in the novel Spider-Man: Requiem, by Jeff Mariotte. This version became Carrion after the Cabal of Scrier used the carrion virus to resurrect him so he can steal the Darkhold from S.H.I.E.L.D. on their behalf. Carter comes into conflict with Spider-Man, but the former fights Carrion for control of his body. When the Cabal attempts to summon Chthon, Carter seemingly sacrifices himself to stop the Elder God. In reality, he hid at his uncle Emory Carter's house, where the latter became infected by the carrion virus. Carter dies and Emory becomes the new Carrion until he is defeated by Spider-Man.
