= New Ways to Die =

2008 Spider-Man comic story arc

- Cover to The Amazing Spider-Man #568. Art by John Romita, Jr.
- Publisher: Marvel Comics
- Publication date: August – October 2008
- Genre: Superhero
- Title(s): The Amazing Spider-Man #568-#573
- Main character(s): Spider-Man; Anti-Venom; Thunderbolts; Norman Osborn; Venom (Mac Gargan); Mister Negative; Harry Osborn

Creative team
- Writer: Dan Slott
- Penciller: John Romita, Jr.
- Inker: Klaus Janson
- Letterer: Cory Petit
- Colorist: Dean White
- Editor(s): Tom Brevoort; Joe Quesada; Stephen Wacker; Thomas Brennan
- Hardcover: ISBN 0-7851-3217-1

"New Ways to Die" is a 2008, six-issue Spider-Man story arc written by Dan Slott with art by John Romita, Jr. and published by Marvel Comics. The arc first appeared in The Amazing Spider-Man #568-#573.

== Plot summary ==
The Thunderbolts, led by Norman Osborn, come to New York City to hunt down the fugitive Spider-Man, who has been framed for a series of murders. Meanwhile, at the F.E.A.S.T. shelter run by Martin Li, the cancer-ridden Eddie Brock is miraculously healed. When the Thunderbolts track Spider-Man to the F.E.A.S.T. shelter, the effects of Li's healing on Brock combine with the Venom symbiote to create Anti-Venom, a symbiote with healing powers. Brock, bound to Anti-Venom, works with Spider-Man to take down the Thunderbolts. Anti-Venom fights Venom in a new, improved scorpion armor from Norman Osborn. "Venorpion" hits Anti-Venom with his stinger and injects a toxin into him that dissolves his suit. After a battle which results in a building collapsing, Songbird tells Spider-Man to lie low for the next few days. Osborn then holds a press conference, saying that Spider-Man has died in the collapse. Meanwhile, Brock's suit reforms.

== Collected editions ==
Title	Material collected	Published date	ISBN
Spider-Man: New Ways To Die	Amazing Spider-Man #568-573	February 2009	978-0785132172
Spider-Man: Brand New Day: The Complete Collection Vol. 2	Amazing Spider-Man #565-577, Amazing Spider-Man Annual #1, Secret Invasion: Amazing Spider-Man #1-3, material from Amazing Spider-Man: Extra! #1	August 2016	978-1302900632

== Reception ==
Amazing Spider-Man #568 sold 82,540 copies, the 7th best selling comics of August 2008. Amazing Spider-Man #573 sold 93,346 copies or 8th for October 2008. IGN gave the first issue of the arc an 8.0 out of 10 and the last issue 6.4.

== See also ==
- Spider-Man Collected Editions
- Spider-Man: Brand New Day
- Kraven's First Hunt
