= Anti-Venom =

Marvel Comics character

- Eddie Brock as Anti-Venom, as depicted on the cover of Amazing Spider-Man Presents: Anti-Venom - New Ways to Live #1 (September 2009). Art by Mirco Pierfederici.

Publication information
- Publisher: Marvel Comics
- First appearance: The Amazing Spider-Man #569 (October 2008)
- Created by: Dan Slott (writer); John Romita Jr. (artist)

In-story information
- Alter ego: Various hosts
- Species: Symbiote–Human white blood cells
- Abilities: All powers of the Venom symbiote's first human host, Spider-Man; Limited shapeshifting and camouflage; Symbiote's autonomous defense capabilities; Undetectable by Spider-Man's "Spider-sense"; Immunity to fire, heat, and sound-based attacks; Produces curative antibodies

Anti-Venom is a fictional antihero appearing in Comic books published by Marvel Comics. It first appeared in The Amazing Spider-Man #569 (August 2008), and was created by Dan Slott and John Romita Jr. The creature belongs to a race of amorphous extraterrestrial parasites known as the Symbiotes and is regarded as Venom's symbiotic brother. His physical features include white "skin", a black face, and spider symbol across his chest.

== Hosts ==
=== Eddie Brock ===
The 2008 story New Ways to Die features the first appearance of Anti-Venom. Eddie Brock gets a job at a soup kitchen under Martin Li, who unknowingly cures Brock's cancer using his Lightforce abilities. After Brock is attacked by Mac Gargan (the Venom symbiote's current host), Venom attempts to reunite with Brock, at which point Brock's skin becomes caustic to the Venom symbiote. Brock is enveloped in a new white "Anti-Venom" symbiote when remnants of the Venom symbiote in his body merge with his antibodies, which were enhanced by Li's Lightforce energy. During the Spider-Island event, Brock sacrifices the Anti-Venom symbiote to cure the Spider-Queen's spider-virus.

=== Ishaan Pai (Second Host) ===
During the "AXIS" storyline, a new version of Anti-Venom is seen in the crowd of new heroes attending a "self help" style seminar being held by Roderick Kingsley (aka the original Hobgoblin). All the new heroes have been given heroic personas by Kingsley that already exist, but are no longer used. It is not shown whether the new Anti-Venom is indeed a symbiote or just a man in a suit designed to look like the original Anti-Venom symbiote. However, the speech bubble used for the character is stylized in a way to suggest a distortion of the character's voice similar to the way Eddie Brock spoke when bonded with the Anti-Venom symbiote.

=== Agent Anti-Venom (Flash Thompson) ===
In the "Venom Inc." storyline, Venom is captured by the Life Foundation and was experimented on. The Life Foundation accidentally pour hydrochloric acid on Venom, giving him a white appearance and new abilities, including intangibility. Venom escapes the Life Foundation and bonds with Flash Thompson, who uses it to become "Agent Anti-Venom".

== Powers and abilities ==
Anyone possessed by the Anti-Venom symbiote gains superhuman strength, durability, and stamina, as well as an accelerated healing factor, genetic memory, wall-crawling, web-generating abilities, spider-senses, and camouflage. The symbiote can also detect its offspring and provides immunity to Spider-Man's own spider-senses.

The original Anti-Venom symbiote is immune to heat and sound-based attacks, the traditional weaknesses of symbiotes. In addition, the Anti-Venom symbiote can produce antibodies that can "cure" a person afflicted by things like radioactivity, parasites, diseases, and drugs. The new Anti-Venom symbiote used by Flash Thompson has the ability to heal physical injuries as well.

== Other versions ==
In What If? Peter Parker became Kraven the Hunter, where Peter Parker killed Kraven the Hunter and replaced Kraven as the new hunter, Madame Web hired Anti-Venom, Spider-Woman and Mac Gargan to stop Peter. Despite mortally injuring him, they were all defeated.

== In other media ==
=== Television ===
- The Anti-Venom symbiote appears in Ultimate Spider-Man, voiced by Matt Lanter. This version was created by Doctor Octopus and Michael Morbius from a sample of the Venom symbiote, with Harry Osborn as its host. In the three-part episode "The Symbiote Saga", Anti-Venom sacrifices itself to cure New York of Carnage's infestation, with its abilities being taken by the Carnage Queen.
- The Anti-Venom symbiote appears in the Spider-Man episode "Vengeance of Venom". This version was created after May Parker uses a sonic device on a symbiote-infected Groot to access his pollination abilities and hybridize it with the symbiote's power to cure the Klyntar's hosts.

=== Video games ===
- The Eddie Brock incarnation of Anti-Venom appears in Marvel Super Hero Squad Online.
- The Eddie Brock incarnation of Anti-Venom appears as a boss in Spider-Man: Edge of Time, voiced by Steve Blum.
- The Anti-Venom symbiote appears as a playable character in Marvel Contest of Champions.
- The Anti-Venom symbiote appears as an alternate skin for Eddie Brock / Venom in Marvel vs. Capcom: Infinite via DLC.
- The Anti-Venom symbiote appears in Marvel's Spider-Man 2. This version was created by Miles Morales and Martin Li purifying trace amounts of the Venom symbiote that had been left behind within Peter Parker as a result of his possession of it; granting him the ability to destroy other symbiotes along with enhanced power without the negative side effects.
- The Anti-Venom symbiote appears as an alternate skin for Eddie Brock / Venom in Marvel Rivals.

=== Tabletop games ===
- The Anti-Venom symbiote appears as a card in Magic: The Gathering.

== Collected editions ==
Title	Material collected	Published date	ISBN
Amazing Spider-Man Presents: Anti-Venom - New Ways To Live	Amazing Spider-Man Presents: Anti-Venom - New Ways To Live #1–3, Extra #2 (Anti-Venom story)	March 2010	978-0785141617
