= Venom (character) =

Marvel Comics character

- Venom taken from a splash page of The Amazing Spider-Man #300 (May 1988). Art by Todd McFarlane.

Publication information
- Publisher: Marvel Comics
- First appearance: As "The Alien Costume": The Amazing Spider-Man #252 (May 1984); As Venom: Cameo appearance: The Amazing Spider-Man #299 (April 1988); Full appearance: The Amazing Spider-Man #300 (May 1988)
- Created by: "The Alien Costume": Randy Schueller; Roger Stern; Tom DeFalco; Mike Zeck; Rick Leonardi; Ron Frenz; Venom: David Michelinie; Todd McFarlane

In-story information
- Alter ego: Various hosts
- Species: Klyntar (Symbiote)
- Place of origin: Klyntar (Gorr's planet)
- Team affiliations: Sinister Six; Dark Avengers; Project Rebirth; Thunderbolts; Secret Avengers; Guardians of the Galaxy; New Warriors; S.H.I.E.L.D.; Agents of Cosmos; Venom-Army; X-Men Blue; Symbiote Imperium; Kree Empire; Savage Avengers
- Notable aliases: Spider-Man, The Black Suit, Alien Costume, The Other, She-Venom, The Sinister Spider-Man, Agent Venom, Superior Venom, Venom Spaceknight, The Spider's Black Spirit, Svartalfvenom
- Abilities: All powers of the symbiote's first human host, Spider-Man; Limited shapeshifting and camouflage; Symbiote's autonomous defense capabilities; Undetectable by Spider-Man's "Spider-sense"

Venom, known formally as "the Symbiote", is a character appearing in American comic books published by Marvel Comics. The character is a sentient alien symbiote with an amorphous, liquid-like form, who survives by bonding with a host, usually human. This dual-life form receives enhanced powers and usually refers to itself as "Venom". The symbiote was originally introduced as a living alien costume in The Amazing Spider-Man #252 (May 1984), with a full first appearance as Venom in The Amazing Spider-Man #300 (May 1988).

The Venom symbiote's first human host was Spider-Man himself, who eventually discovered its true nefarious nature and separated himself from the creature in The Amazing Spider-Man #258 (November 1984)—with a brief rejoining five months later in Web of Spider-Man #1.

The symbiote went on to merge with other hosts, beginning with Eddie Brock, its second host, with whom it first became Venom. Venom has endured as one of Spider-Man's most prominent villains, and was initially regarded as one of his three archenemies, alongside Norman Osborn and Doctor Octopus. Since his debut however, Venom has evolved into an antiheroic figure, slowly distancing himself from his initial goal to ruin Spider-Man's life to try and do good instead, even putting aside his differences with and helping Spider-Man at times. In 1993, Venom would transition into having a role as an antihero vigilante in the Venom: Lethal Protector comic book series.

After Brock, numerous other hosts for Venom followed, including the villain Mac Gargan, who was the main incarnation of Venom from 2005 to 2009, and Flash Thompson, who became the superhero Agent Venom from 2011 to 2016, before Venom returned to Brock in 2017, with Brock's biological son Dylan Brock becoming Venom's next host in 2021. In All-New Venom in 2025, Dylan's foster mother Mary Jane Watson succeeds the Brocks as Venom's new host. Venom is also depicted as having spawned several children—Scream, Lasher, Phage, Agony, Riot, Mania, Sleeper, and Carnage, the last of whom becomes Venom's archenemy after bonding with serial killer Cletus Kasady.

A fan-favorite character and well-known figure in popular culture, Venom (primarily the Eddie Brock incarnation) is the most recognizable Spider-Man antagonist not first introduced during the original Lee/Ditko run. He has been featured in various media adaptations of Spider-Man over the years, including films, television series and video games. The character was portrayed by Tobey Maguire and Topher Grace in Spider-Man 3 (2007), with Tom Hardy primarily portraying the character in the Sony's Spider-Man Universe films Venom (2018), Venom: Let There Be Carnage (2021), and Venom: The Last Dance (2024), as well as an uncredited post-credit scene appearance in the Marvel Cinematic Universe film Spider-Man: No Way Home (2021).

The Eddie Brock incarnation of Venom is among Spider-Man's most famous rogues, and is regarded by many as a dark reflection of the hero. Comics journalist and historian Mike Conroy writes of the character: "What started out as a replacement costume for Spider-Man turned into one of the Marvel web-slinger's greatest nightmares." Venom was rated 33rd on Empire's 50 Greatest Comic Book Characters, and ranked 22nd on IGN's 100 Greatest Comic Villains of All Time.

== Conception and creation ==
The original idea of a new costume for Spider-Man that would later become the character Venom was conceived by a Marvel Comics reader from Norridge, Illinois named Randy Schueller. In 1982, Jim Shooter, Marvel's editor-in-chief at the time, sent Schueller a letter acknowledging Marvel's interest in the idea, which they ended up purchasing from him for $220. Shooter came up with the idea of switching Spider-Man to a black-and-white costume, possibly influenced by the intended costume design for the new Julia Carpenter version of Spider-Woman. Artists Mike Zeck and Rick Leonardi designed the black costume.

Writer/artist John Byrne says on his website that he conceived a costume of self-healing biological material when he was the artist on Iron Fist—to explain how that character's costume was constantly being torn and then apparently repaired by the next issue. Byrne says explaining that he ended up not using the idea on that title, but that Roger Stern later asked him if he could use the idea for Spider-Man's alien costume. Stern in turn plotted the issue in which the costume first appeared but then left the title. It was writer Tom DeFalco and artist Ron Frenz who established that the costume was a sentient alien being that was vulnerable to high sonic energy during their run on The Amazing Spider-Man that preceded David Michelinie's.

With the nature of the symbiote established, Michelinie felt it could serve a character concept he had been toying with for some time. When Michelinie first began working on Spider-Man stories he noted that the most unique ability Spider-Man possessed as a superhero was his spider sense, which Michelinie claimed gave the character a level of invulnerability on par or better than much stronger Marvel superheroes. While other Spider-Man antagonists such as Green Goblin and Mysterio had been able to temporarily disable Spider-Man's spider sense through chemical means, Michelinie was fascinated by the idea of a villain who could permanently evade Spider-Man's spider sense and what kind of consequences that would have on both Spider-Man as a superhero and Peter Parker's personal life. After initially coming up with characters who were able to evade Spider-Man's spider sense through cybernetic means that were rejected by Marvel editors, Michelinie posited that the symbiote would make a human host be able to evade Spider-Man's spider sense through it being mutated by absorbing Spider-Man's genetic material when Spider-Man was its host. This idea was approved by Marvel editors and Michelinie was given the green light to further refine the character.

The symbiote was first introduced as Spider-Man's new black costume in The Amazing Spider-Man #252 (May 1984) as part of a story called "Homecoming!" The story takes place after Spider-Man's return from the events of the miniseries Secret Wars, where he first obtains the black costume. The full first appearance of Venom is in The Amazing Spider-Man #300 (May 1988), after the symbiote bonds with Eddie Brock.

== Hosts ==
=== Spider-Man (Peter Parker) ===
The Venom symbiote bonds to Spider-Man in Secret Wars #8. Art by Mike Zeck.

The story of how Spider-Man gets his new black costume is recounted in Marvel Super Heroes Secret Wars #8 (December 1984), in which writer Jim Shooter and artist Mike Zeck depicted the heroes and villains of the Marvel Universe transported to another planet called Battleworld by a being called the Beyonder. After Spider-Man's costume is ruined from battles with the villains, he is directed by Thor and the Hulk to a room at the heroes' base where they inform him a machine can read his thoughts and instantly fabricate any type of clothing. Choosing a machine he believes to be the correct one, Spider-Man causes a black sphere to appear before him, which spreads over his body, dissolving the tattered old costume and covering his body to form a new black and white costume. To Spider-Man's surprise, the costume can mimic street clothes and provides a seemingly inexhaustible and stronger supply of webbing.

During their run on The Amazing Spider-Man, writer Tom DeFalco and artist Ron Frenz established that the costume was a sentient alien symbiote that was vulnerable to both fire and high sonic energy. It was in that storyline that the costume would envelop Peter Parker while he slept, and go out at night to fight crime, leaving Parker inexplicably exhausted in the morning. Parker had the costume examined by Reed Richards, who discovered that it was alive, and when Parker realized it was trying to permanently bond to Parker's body, he rejected it, and it was subsequently contained by the Fantastic Four. The symbiote escaped and bonded again to Parker, who used sound waves from a cathedral's church bell to repel it. But the symbiote had grown an emotional attachment to Peter, so he willingly left Peter's unconscious body and moved him to safety before disappearing.

In the 2018 "Go Down Swinging" storyline, Norman Osborn is bonded to the Carnage symbiote, and Spider-Man rebonds to the Venom symbiote in an attempt to stop Osborn, now calling himself Red Goblin, while forgiving both Eddie and Venom for the past conflicts. During the ensuing battle, Osborn mortally injures Flash Thompson, but the conflict ends with the two symbiotes detaching from the two human hosts.

=== Eddie Brock ===
David Michelinie would later write the backstory of Eddie Brock as the alien's new host that would become the villain Venom, using the events of Peter David's 1985 "Sin Eater" storyline in The Spectacular Spider-Man as a basis for Brock's origin. According to artist Ron Frenz, in Michelinie's original plot for Venom's first appearance, he conceived the villain as a large, muscular figure, whose manifestation of the alien costume would include the appearance of a mouth. In an interview with Tom DeFalco, artist Todd McFarlane also corroborates that Michelinie did indeed come up with the idea of Venom and the description of him as "a big guy in the black costume", while he, McFarlane, devised the villain's monstrous features. Venom's existence was first indicated in Web of Spider-Man #18 (September 1986), by Michelenie and artist Marc Silvestri, which shows character shoving Peter Parker in front of a subway train without Parker's spider-sense warning him, though only Brock's hand is seen on-panel. The next indication of Venom's existence was in Web of Spider-Man #24 (March 1987), by Michelinie and Del Barras. In that issue, when Parker climbs out of a high story window to change into Spider-Man, but finds a black arm coming through the window and grabbing him, again without being warned by his spider-sense. Michelinie took over as write on The Amazing Spider-Man. He was subsequently joined on that book by artist Todd McFarlane with issue 298 (March 1988), in which Venom appears in shadow. Venom made his cameo appearance on the last page of The Amazing Spider-Man #299 (April 1988), in which he terrorizes Parker's wife, Mary Jane Watson. Michelinie's script for that page reads as follows:

But as she enters the apartment and turns on the lamp next to the sofa, she starts as she looks over to a still-shadowy corner where she sees the white spider and eye-shapes from Spidey's costume. Thinking that Peter is home, she starts to scold him gently–but stops, surprised, as she sees a white smile form beneath the eye-shapes. Not a pretty smile; a scary smile. Like that of a predator sure of a quick kill The form then steps from the shadows and we can see that it is dressed in a Spider-Man costume, but it is definitely not Peter Parker. Besides the feral smile, the man's body is huge, bulky, massively muscled like Arnold Schwarzenegger on a good day. MJ backs up, terrified, as the stranger reaches a hand out towards her, his lopsided animal smile stretching to the point where it almost connects behind his head, a totally inhuman gesture. Then, at last, he speaks "Hi, honey… I'm home!'"

The villain then made his first full-issue appearance in The Amazing Spider-Man #300 (May 1988). in which he is confronted by Spider-Man, and reveals that he was a Daily Globe reporter named Eddie Brock, who worked on the Sin-Eater case, and that his career was ruined when it was discovered that the man Brock announced as the Sin-Eater was a compulsive confessor. Forced to eke out a living writing lurid stories for venomous tabloids, Brock blamed Spider-Man for his predicament. He took up bodybuilding to reduce stress. It failed to do so, and Brock sank into a suicidal depression. Seeking solace at the church where Spider-Man repelled the symbiote, the symbiote—sensing Brock's hatred for Spider-Man—bonded with the disgraced reporter. Brock took on the name Venom in reference to the sensationalistic material he was forced to traffic in following his fall from grace.

Over the years, as the symbiote gained more intelligence and moved to additional human hosts, the name began to apply to the symbiote as well as its hosts. As Venom, Brock fights Spider-Man many times, winning on several occasions. Venom repeatedly tries to kill Peter Parker/Spider-Man—both when the latter was in and out of costume. Thus Parker is forced to abandon his "black costume", which the symbiote had been mimicking, after Venom confronts Parker's wife Mary Jane.

Venom escapes from the supervillain prison, The Vault, to torment Spider-Man and his family. The symbiote is finally rendered comatose after being subdued by Styx's plague virus, and Eddie Brock is subsequently placed in Ryker's Island Prison. When the symbiote recovers and returns to free Brock, it leaves a spawn to bond with Brock's psychotic serial-killer cellmate Cletus Kasady, who becomes Carnage. Meanwhile, Venom and Spider-Man fight on a deserted island, and Spider-Man strands Venom there after faking his own death. Soon after, however, Spider-Man brings Venom back to New York City to stop Carnage's killing spree. After being incarcerated once again, Venom is used to create five new symbiotes, which are all paired with human hosts.

As well as helping Eddie Brock to seek continued revenge against Spider-Man, the symbiote also aids Brock in a sporadic career as a vigilante. From February to July 1993, a solo Venom series, Venom: Lethal Protector, ran for six issues. Venom: Lethal Predator notably marked in a significant change in Venom's comic book role, as he would now become more of an antihero vigilante figure. He and the symbiote occasionally share a desire to protect innocent people from harm, even if it means working side by side with the hated Spider-Man. This is especially true when Venom combats the entity he believes to be his spawn, Carnage. When Spider-Man helps Venom save Brock's ex-wife Anne Weying, the two form a temporary truce, though this falls apart after Weying's suicide.

The symbiote is temporarily stolen by U.S. Senator Steward Ward, who hopes to better understand his own alien infection by researching the symbiote before it returns to Brock. Now, however, it dominates its host, Brock, rather than vice versa. Eventually, Eddie Brock and the symbiote go their separate ways as the symbiote grows tired of having a diseased host and Eddie rejects its growing bloodlust, leading him to sell the symbiote at a super villain auction.

The creature that would become Venom was born in the 998th generation to a race of extraterrestrial symbiotes, which lived by possessing the bodies of other life-forms. The parasites would endow their victims with enhanced physical abilities, at the cost of fatally draining them of adrenaline. According to the 1995 "Planet of the Symbiotes" storyline, the Venom symbiote, after separated from its first host, was deemed insane by its own race after it was discovered that it desired to commit to its host rather than use it up. The symbiote was then imprisoned on Battleworld to ensure it did not pollute the species' gene pool.

The symbiote bonds with its new host, Lee Price, launching volume 3 of the Venom comic book series. The series ran for six issues total (Nov. 2016 – April 2017). Eddie Brock is able to regain the Venom symbiote at the conclusion of the series, returning the Venom comic book title to volume 1 with issue #150.

=== Scorpion (Mac Gargan) ===
The Venom symbiote approached Mac Gargan, the villain formerly known as Scorpion, and offered him new abilities as the second Venom. Gargan bonded with the creature, which would later give him an extra edge as part of Norman Osborn's Sinister Twelve. As the Avengers dealt with the rest of the Twelve, Spider-Man swiftly defeated Gargan, even with these additional powers, which Spider-Man suggests is attributed to the fact that Mac Gargan does not hate Spider-Man as much as Eddie Brock did.

Gargan later becomes a member of a sub-group of the Thunderbolts, which was drafted by the Avengers to hunt down the members of the fugitive New Avengers. Gargan is outfitted with electrical implants by the government to keep the symbiote in check.

When in the Venom persona, Gargan retains little of his original personality and is controlled almost completely by the symbiote, which drives him to cannibalism. When the symbiote was dormant in his body, he expressed nausea and fear of the organism. During a fight with "Anti-Venom" (Eddie Brock), Gargan and Venom are separated and Venom is nearly destroyed. Remnants of Venom remain in Gargan's blood and are restored after Osborn gives Gargan a vaccine harnessing Anti-Venom's healing powers. Gargan dons a Scorpion battle armor over the symbiote while it heals, causing him to become what Spider-Man calls "Ven-orpion". After the symbiote is fully restored, it shatters the armor.

After ingesting a chemical given to him by Norman Osborn, Venom transforms into a more human appearance similar to the Black-Suited Spider-Man. Osborn introduces him as The Amazing Spider-Man, a member of the Dark Avengers, while unveiling the team. After the Siege of Asgard, Gargan and most of the Dark Avengers are taken into custody. While Gargan is held on the Raft, Venom is forcefully removed from him.

=== Agent Venom (Flash Thompson) ===
On December 9, 2010, Marvel Comics announced a new "black ops" Venom operating for the government. This new Venom was featured in a new series called Venom in March 2011. The birth of the new Venom can be seen in The Amazing Spider-Man #654 in February 2011. On January 28, 2011, Venom's identity was revealed to be Flash Thompson. Flash is hired by the government to be a special agent wearing the Venom symbiote as part of Project Rebirth. Flash is only allowed to wear the suit for up to 48 hours, or risk a permanent bonding with the symbiote. Along with the alien, Flash is equipped with a "Multi-Gun" designed to change into any type of gun he needs. The Government is also equipped with a "kill switch" designed to take Flash out if he loses control. Flash rejects the kill switch and later joins the Secret Avengers, Thunderbolts, Guardians of the Galaxy, and is appointed as a Space Knight by the Klyntar.

=== Lee Price ===
Lee Price first appeared in Venom vol. 3 #1. After being separated from Flash Thompson through unspecified means, the Venom symbiote happens upon a black market deal between Black Cat's gang and Tombstone's gang. He resorts to bonding with one of the men present, a discharged Army Ranger named Lee Price who was with Scorpion as part of Black Cat's gang. The weakened symbiote pleads with Price, attempting to convince him to become a hero like Thompson. Price ignores and overpowers it, intent on using it for personal gain as a new, wholly villainous Venom.

Price makes his way to Black Cat's hideout where Scorpion accuses him of botching the black market sale by causing the shoot-out. After having to keep the Venom symbiote from attacking Black Cat, Price takes his leave from Black Cat's lair as Scorpion gets suspicious towards Price. His departure is seen by some FBI Agents. Price later gets attacked by Tombstone's minion Firebug. Upon defeating Firebug, an FBI Agent with a bazooka appears telling Price that he is under arrest.

Lee Price eventually loses the symbiote when Eddie Brock and Spider-Man take him down and he is arrested by the NYPD.

While incarcerated at the New York Corrections Supermax Facility for Superhuman Incarceration, Price is feared by most of the inmates and he even defeats three inmates in the prison's cafeteria when they try to kill him to boost their reputation. After a trial, Price is released from prison, planning to reclaim Venom and take revenge on those who have wronged him.

In Venom Inc., Price steals the Mania symbiote from Andy and becomes Maniac. He uses the symbiote to infect the crime bosses and become a criminal kingpin, but he is defeated by Spider-Man, Venom, Black Cat and Agent Anti-Venom. While in prison, Price is killed by Cletus Kasady.

=== Tel-Kar ===
Tel-Kar first appeared in Venom: First Host #1. During the Kree-Skrull War, the Kree, desiring to replicate the Skrull's shape-shifting abilities, obtain the newborn Venom, which had been outcast from the other symbiotes, on Gorr's planet where Knull had created the symbiotes. Tel-Kar is recruited to be bonded to the newborn symbiote to infiltrate the Skrull army. Tel-Kar's body is biologically altered so he can have full control over the symbiote's mind to the point of erasing its memories. He successfully infiltrated the Skrull army discovering various secrets. However he blew his cover up to save some Kree refugees and handed the symbiote to them to return it to Hala. Then Tel-Kar was betrayed by Ronan the Accuser who used a Kree Sentry to capture Tel-Kar and was given to the Skrulls as a war criminal. Separated from Tel-Kar after his capture, the symbiote goes on to be bonded to Spider-Man.

Tel-Kar escapes the Skrulls and wanders through the Galaxy thinking that the War is still going on, until he hears of an agent from Earth called Flash Thompson with a black symbiote suit. Recognizing it as his symbiote, he goes to Earth to find it. Eddie Brock arrives with the symbiote and saves Tel-Kar from the Warbride Skrull M'Lanz, who had followed him. Angered by Venom's refusal to return to him, Tel-Kar threatens to bond to Venom's latest offspring and turn it into a monster. Acceding to Tel-Kar, Venom reunites with him and they go to a Skrull research base to get a Skrull bioweapon. Simultaneously, Eddie is bonded to the offspring calling itself Sleeper and allies with M'Lanz to stop Tel-Kar. During the ensuing battle, Tel-Kar concludes that he does not need Venom anymore and uses an electrified spear to detach himself from it while scarring himself in the process. Later he is betrayed by the Kree empire while Eddie escapes with Venom and M'Lanz with Sleeper. Tel-Kar, now furious, attempts to release the bioweapon on Earth to kill all humanity, but Sleeper bonds to Tel-Kar and lobotomizes him as punishment for what he did to Venom and Eddie. Sleeper, now with Tel-Kar's body, wishes Eddie farewell and goes on to explore the universe.

=== Malekith ===
During the War of the Realms event, after Venom was separated from Eddie, the symbiote, in its humanoid form, joined the War Avengers (composed of Captain Marvel, Deadpool, Sif, Winter Soldier, Weapon H, Black Widow, and Captain Britain). Malekith captures Venom and makes it into a weapon to use against the Asgardians. Malekith enhances the symbiote with his dark magic and bonded the symbiote to his various acolytes, turning them into the Spider-Elves. After the Thor Corps arrives, Malekith declares himself the Butcher of Thor. However, he was defeated and the symbiote was ultimately free from Malekith's control.

=== Other hosts ===
Aside from the aforementioned hosts, there have been other, shorter term hosts for the Venom symbiote.

==== Scarlet Spider (Ben Reilly) ====
In the Planet of the Symbiotes storyline, the symbiote was rejected by Eddie, causing it to release a powerful scream that attracts the other symbiotes to Earth. Subsequently, the symbiote sees Scarlet Spider, (Ben Reilly) and takes the form of his hooded top attempting to bond to Ben mistaking him for Spider-Man but failed owing to Ben's strong will. When it was later discovered by Brock and Peter Parker, the symbiote returned to Eddie.

==== Anne Weying ====
Anne Weying as She-Venom. Art by Greg Luzniak.

Anne Weying first appears in The Amazing Spider-Man #375. She is Eddie Brock's ex-wife and a successful lawyer. Weying assists Spider-Man by sharing some of Brock's history. Later, she follows Spider-Man to the amusement park where Venom had Peter's (fake) parents. She confronts Brock and manages to convince him to end his feud. After Sin-Eater shoots Ann as part of a crusade against social injustice, Ann becomes She-Venom when Venom temporarily bonds with her to save her life. She-Venom lashes out against the men who had hurt her, and Brock becomes afraid for her (and of her) and compels the symbiote to return to him. Ann is left distraught at her actions while bonded. Later Ann is arrested on a false charge as part of a trap for Venom. She manages to warn Brock who sends the symbiote to her, allowing her to become She-Venom and escape custody. Some time later, Ann, traumatized by her experiences with Venom and the symbiote, commits suicide after seeing Spider-Man pass by her window in a black costume, believing it is Brock returning for her.

==== Patricia Robertson ====
The story follows U.S. Army communication specialist Patricia Robertson. During a supply run to an Ararat Corporation owned outpost she discovers everyone at the installation dead except for one scientist. It is revealed that the Ararat Corporation is run by an alien colony of miniature spider robots led by an entity named Bob, that have infiltrated the American government. The Ararat Corporation has cloned Venom to facilitate the extermination of humanity, but the clone ravages its hosts. The clone is responsible for the death of the outpost crew.

Robertson finds an ally in the Suit, a mysterious individual made of the same miniature robots as Bob, revealed to have been accidentally brought to Earth by Reed Richards. The Suit modifies Robertson while she is unconscious to allow her to control the clone if it bonds with her. The Suit sabotages Wolverine, the clones favored host, forcing it to bond with Robertson. One of Bob's agents convinces Robertston to kill the real Venom to save humanity, causing her to free the incarcerated Venom. She and Venom fight, but Venom escapes. Bob remotely deactivates the technology allowing Robertson to control the clone forcing her to rely on willpower. Later, Robertson and Venom again fight, and Venom absorbs the clone. Venom decides to carry out the clone's mission given to it by the Ararat corporation. The series did not continue and the plot remained unresolved as of 2012. Venom would later regurgitate and expel the clone from its body, allowing it to bond with a teenager named Andrea "Andi" Benton. Taking the name Mania, Benton became Agent Venom's partner for a time.

==== Angelo Fortunato ====
Angelo Fortunato first appeared in Marvel Knights Spider-Man #7 created by Mark Millar and Terry Dodson. Angelo is the son of Don Fortunato, a prominent Mafia capo. His frail physique and shy attitude leave Angelo frequently bullied and humiliated by his father, who attends a supervillain auction and purchases Venom from a sickly Brock for $100 million. Brock warns Angelo of the symbiote, but Angelo rebuffs him, saying that he has nothing to lose. After bonding with the symbiote, Angelo discovers the secret identity of Spider-Man, and attempts to kill him to prove his worth. Spider-Man ultimately defeats Angelo and when he tries to escape, the symbiote abandons Angelo for his cowardice while he is leaping between buildings, leaving him to fall to his death. Spider-Man tried to save him, but he ran out of webs.

==== Kulan Gath ====
In the 2008 Spider-Man / Red Sonja miniseries, where Spider-Man and Red Sonja, possessing the body of Mary Jane, fought the evil wizard Kulan Gath, who had possessed a U.S. senator, Kulan detached the symbiote from Eddie and bonded to it, becoming Kulan Venom. Luckily, the symbiote returned to Eddie, following the defeat of Kulan.

==== Ms. Marvel (Carol Danvers) ====
During the Siege, Mac Gargan with the symbiote was fighting Spider-Man and Ms. Marvel. When they separated Mac from Venom, the symbiote briefly bonded to Carol and started flying away. But Carol gathered her powers and detached from the symbiote which rebonded to Mac.

==== Red Hulk (Thunderbolt Ross) ====
During the Circle of Four storyline, when Red Hulk came crashing into Flash's apartment so he can recruit him, the symbiote sensing Red Hulk as a danger, briefly bonds to him so he does not do any harm to Flash. Then when Red Hulk calms down, the symbiote returns to Flash. During the fight against Blackheart, Hulk bonded again with the symbiote along with Zarathos to prevent Hell from coming to Earth.

==== Superior Spider-Man (Otto Octavius) ====
When Flash Thompson with the symbiote was infiltrating into the Crime Master's men, Superior Spider-Man came attacking the criminals who was then confronted by Agent Venom. Doc Ock, thinking that Venom was still evil, attacked Flash with Web Shooters filled with burner fuel and in the process injured Flash. While Flash was recovering, Superior Spider-Man put the symbiote in a canister and gave Flash a pair of prosthetic legs. Then the symbiote broke out and, instead of bonding to Flash, bonded to Superior Spider-Man, as it was still connected to Peter's body. After bonding to the symbiote, Otto called himself the Superior Venom and went solving crime in a much more brutal way. Then Mary Jane called the Avengers to stop the Superior Venom. But the Avengers proved to be no match to Superior Venom since he had the abilities of Spider-Man, powered by Venom, with the mind of Doctor Octopus. In the fight Otto realizes that the symbiote was messing with his head and with the help of Peter's consciousness and Flash's (who had arrived in an Iron Man suit) he separated himself from Venom which returned to Flash.

==== Groot, Rocket Raccoon and Drax ====
When Flash was part of the Guardians of the Galaxy he got separated from the symbiote and his teammates decided to send him to Earth. While traveling, Groot accidentally bonds to the symbiote and started attacking the others. Rocket tried to save his friend, but the symbiote left Groot and bonded to him. He then tried to convince them to leave the ship, but Drax grabbed Rocket by the tail and started bashing him against the wall until the symbiote bonded to Drax and defeated the whole team. The symbiote possessed Drax, took control of the ship, and went to a planet formed from symbiotes named Klyntar (later revealed to be Knull's cage) where the symbiote was purified and bonded to Flash.

==== Mercurio the 4-D Man ====
Agent Venom as Venom Space Knight foils the Gramosian's attempts to steal resources from the home planets of the P'qui and the Wugin, and to acquire chemical weapons derived from the blood of kidnapped Vvexians.

Mercurio forces a Ruu'lto named Pik Rollo, whose child he is holding hostage, to try and assassinate Agent Venom, but Rollo instead betrays Mercurio, and joins forces with Venom. When the two lay siege to Mercurio's headquarters, he incapacitates and imprisons them, and separates Venom from Flash Thompson. Sensing the symbiote's suppressed bloodlust, Mercurio attempts to convince it to join him, but it instead frees and returns to Thompson. The reformed Agent Venom and his allies proceed to dismantle Mercurio's forces, but Mercurio himself escapes, and swears vengeance on both the symbiote and Thompson.

A bout of temporary insanity that Venom subsequently experiences is eventually discerned to have been caused by its brief fusion with Mercurio, whose evil had undone the mental "cleansing" that the creature had earlier undergone.

==== Mysterio (Quentin Beck) ====
In the mini-series Symbiote Spider-Man (set during the period when Spider-Man was still bonded to the symbiote), Mysterio blackmailed Black Cat into stealing a piece of Spider-Man's suit for him. When he had his friend, Jonathan Ohnn, a scientist working for the Kingpin, examine the piece, the symbiote controlling Peter's body came to retrieve it, however, after clashing with the Kingpin's men, was unable to find it and fled. The severed piece of symbiote bonded to Mysterio, allowing him to escape from the Kingpin's interrogation. He then went after Spider-Man to steal the suit and use it for himself.

== Powers and abilities ==
Though it requires a living host to survive, Venom is adept at fending for itself independent of a host. The symbiote is capable of shapeshifting abilities, including the ability to form spikes or expand its size, as well as mimic the appearance of other humanoids after it has obtained a host. The organism can additionally use its shape-shifting abilities to conceal itself by altering its coloration or by becoming completely invisible. It also contains a small "dimensional aperture", allowing its hosts to carry items without adding mass to the costume. The symbiote also exhibits telepathic abilities, primarily when it needs to communicate with its host, possibly also technopathy as it is able to summon a flying device to help it escape from the Baxter Building.

Because of its contact with Spider-Man, the symbiote grants all of its subsequent hosts that hero's powers and cannot be detected by his spider-sense. As Spider-Man's fighting style is partly dependent on his spider-sense, his effectiveness was somewhat hampered when he battled Eddie Brock. Retaining its memory from the time it was bonded with Spider-Man, Venom is also capable of producing webbing similar to Spider-Man's variety created from its biomass.

The symbiote greatly enhances the physical strength of those it bonds with. Its hosts experience a vastly larger size and musculature. The symbiote displays non-human teeth, which are very sharp, and commonly protrudes a long, prehensile tongue from its mouth. Venom is depicted as being physically much bigger than Spider-Man, as well as having more brute strength.

Venom exhibits some immunities to the supernatural powers of others such as the Penance Stare of Ghost Rider or Spider-Man's extrasensory spider-sense.

Some incarnations of Venom are able to self-duplicate. This ability is shown in the 2005–2006 miniseries Spider-Man: Reign when Venom recreates his symbiote to combat his loneliness.

Venom is vulnerable to fire and sonic waves, causing it great pain and exhaustion if it sustains enough exposure. It can sense and track all of its offspring symbiotes except Carnage, who learned how to block this ability shortly after bonding with Cletus Kasady and confronting Venom/Eddie Brock for the first time.

Venom is shown to form giant web-like dragon wings when it was in contact with Knull.

== Other versions ==
=== Mayhem (April Parker) ===
In the Marvel Comics 2 series, some of Venom's genetic material was taken by Norman Osborn and used to create a human/Symbiote hybrid. Mayday Parker, considering the symbiote family, allows it to live with her. The symbiote names itself April Parker and befriends May's friends especially Gene Thompson, Flash Thompson's son. Later on, April becomes jealous towards Mayday and confronts her, but inadvertently kills her in battle. Overcome with guilt, April sacrifices herself to resurrect Spider-Girl. April Parker was created by Tom DeFalco and Ron Frenz, first appearing in Amazing Spider-Girl #20 (July 2008).

=== Marvel 2099 ===
Kron Stone as Venom 2099

Two versions of Venom appear in the Marvel 2099 imprint.

==== Kron Stone ====
Kron Stone is the older half-brother of Spider-Man 2099 (Miguel O'Hara). As a child, Stone was continually abused by an android housekeeper who mistook him for a dog. He later became a bully, taking enjoyment in other people's pain. In his introduction, Stone orders Jake Gallows' family to be killed. Gallows finds Stone and fatally wounds him with a knife. Before he can die, Stone bonds with Venom, which had mutated over the years and gained acidic blood and saliva. With this new power, Stone seeks to emotionally torture Miguel—whom Stone never knew was his half-brother—by hurting those close to him. The symbiote bonds with Stone on a molecular level, giving him an amorphous physiology that allows his body to take on the properties of the symbiote itself.

==== Alea Bell ====
Alea Bell as Venom 2099

A new Venom 2099, Alea Bell, was introduced in a similarly named one-shot published in 2019. When she was a child, her left arm was badly burned in a crash that also killed her mother. Raised by her father Theo, Alea was bullied at school over her scars. She was then selected to undergo an experimental treatment being developed by Alchemax scientist Dr. Russell. She regained consciousness to find that the treatment had worked and her arm was restored. During a confrontation the next day with a girl at school, a black tendril emerges from Alea's hand and slices through her monitoring bracelet. Alea learns that the purported panacea she had been treated with was a piece of Venom, and that Alchemax intended to turn her into a supersoldier using it. Empathizing with its pain, Alea reluctantly agrees to the symbiote's request to be made whole in exchange for her getting her normal life back.

=== Spider-Gwen ===
In this reality, Elsa Brock created the Venom symbiote from radioactive spider isotopes developed by S.I.L.K. leader Cindy Moon to cure the Lizard formula as requested by Matt Murdock, to offer Spider-Woman a solution to losing her powers and curing the new Lizard, Harry Osborn. Gwen is forced to inject Harry with one of her spider isotopes, causing the serum inside him to mutate into Venom and attach to Wolverine before bonding to Gwen. Though Gwen succumbs to the symbiote's bloodlust at first, after discovering her father was brutally beaten by Rhino in prison, she eventually learned to control it.

=== Ultimate Marvel ===
Venom (Ultimate Marvel version).

The Ultimate iteration of Venom was created by writer Brian Michael Bendis and artist Mark Bagley and was introduced in Ultimate Spider-Man #33, while the Conrad Markus version was introduced in Ultimate Spider-Man Volume 2 #16.1. His appearance was designed by Mark Bagley to be more of a monster than a supervillain, describing him as a "huge cancerous/tumorous creature".

==== Eddie Brock Jr. ====
The Ultimate Marvel version of Eddie Brock was a writer for the Daily Globe. He was at Justin Hammer's press conference; his face is not shown, only his hands and arms appear. Eddie Brock Jr. is Peter Parker's childhood friend (along with a college student who is a lab assistant for Curtis Conners) and the Venom symbiote is not extraterrestrial but is the second stage of a genetically created "suit" designed by Richard Parker (Peter's father) and Eddie Brock Sr. (Eddie's father) as a cure for severe disease meant to bond to the user and protect them from internal and external harm. The suit is tailored for a specific DNA (Richard's in this case), and the person to whom it belongs can control the suit more easily. If, however, someone uses a suit designed for somebody else, they are constantly damaged by the suit which requires nourishment, gained by feeding on organic flesh, to function. If bonded to an incompatible host the Venom suit begins consuming them almost immediately, forcing them to feed on others to sustain it or die themselves. When taking a host, the organic matter that comprises the suit completely envelops the host, regardless of resistance, temporarily blinding it, before encasing itself in a hard, purple casing, similar to a pupa, as it bonds further with the host. When the host emerges, the suit then shifts its appearance and function to assist its host, such as creating eyes for it to see through, or tries to take it over, inducing a homicidal rage and attempting to feed itself if bonded with an incompatible host. When bonded with a host and forcibly removed, the Venom suit leaves trace amounts of itself in their bloodstream, which attracts other samples of Venom to itself, and can overload Peter's spider-sense.

==== Conrad Marcus ====
Conrad Marcus was an employee at Oscorp who helped create the spider behind Miles Morales's powers. An employee of the Roxxon Corporation, Marcus willingly becomes the Venom symbiote's new host and was a more larger Venom than the Eddie Brock's version. When investigative reporter Betty Brant incorrectly assumes that the new Spider-Man (Miles Morales) is Jefferson Davis, Venom kills Betty. Afterwards, Venom destroys Oscorp's abandoned building and later appears at Miles's apartment due to his believing Jefferson to be the new Spider-Man. During the ensuing battle between Venom and Spider-Man, Jefferson is injured and taken to a hospital. Venom appears there, leading to another battle with Spider-Man and the police that accidentally kills both Rio Morales and Marcus.

=== Ultimate Universe ===
An alternate universe version of Venom appears in Ultimate Spider-Man (2024). This version is a picotech stealth suit created by Howard Stark. The suit contains webbing built into it, has the ability to shapeshift its appearance, and can compact into a small orb.

== In other media ==
=== Television ===
- Venom appears in Spider-Man: The Animated Series, with Spider-Man's version voiced by Christopher Daniel Barnes and Eddie Brock's version by Hank Azaria. In the three-part episode "The Alien Costume", the symbiote arrives on Earth via a meteorite sample that John Jameson collected called Promethium X. Spider-Man bonds with the symbiote before eventually rejecting it, after which it bonds to Brock, turning him into Venom. They seek revenge on Spider-Man, who defeats and separates them before sending Venom back to space. In the episodes "Venom Returns" and "Carnage", Venom returns to Earth, re-fuses with Brock, and joins forces with Spider-Man and Iron Man to combat Carnage, Dormammu, and Baron Mordo before Venom and Brock sacrifice themselves to ensure the villains' defeat.
- The Eddie Brock incarnation of Venom appears in Spider-Man Unlimited (1999), voiced by Brian Drummond. This version of the Venom symbiote evolved into a more powerful form, gaining full control of its host's body as well as elasticity and the ability to change into a liquid-esque form. Venom and Carnage travel to Counter-Earth to join the Synoptic, a hive mind of symbiotes, and ally themselves with the High Evolutionary while secretly helping the Synoptic grow powerful enough to infect the planet's population with symbiotes.
- Venom appears in The Spectacular Spider-Man, with Spider-Man's version voiced by Josh Keaton and Eddie Brock's version voiced by Benjamin Diskin. Introduced in the episode "The Uncertainty Principle", the symbiote arrives on Earth by stowing away on John Jameson's space shuttle and bonds to Spider-Man. After eventually being rejected, it bonds with Brock to seek revenge in the episode "Intervention", but is ultimately defeated and separated in the episode "Nature vs. Nurture". Venom reappears in the episodes "First Steps", "Growing Pains", and "Identity Crisis", wherein it rejoins Brock and attempts to expose Spider-Man's secret identity, only to be foiled and separated from Brock once more, though it manages to escape.
- Venom appears in Ultimate Spider-Man (2012), with Harry Osborn and Flash Thompson's versions voiced by Matt Lanter and Norman Osborn / Green Goblin's version voiced by Steven Weber. Introduced in a self-titled episode, this version of the Venom symbiote is created by Doctor Octopus using a sample of Spider-Man's blood. After it escapes from its creator, it temporarily fuses with a number of individuals, such as Thompson, Nova, Power Man, Iron Fist and Spider-Man, until it eventually bonds with Harry, who tries to become a hero to impress his father in the episode "Back in Black". However, the Green Goblin takes it for himself in the episode "The Rise of the Green Goblin" and, over the course of the episodes "Carnage", "Venom Bomb", and "The Avenging Spider-Man", uses the symbiote to create the Carnage symbiote, infect himself and the S.H.I.E.L.D. Helicarrier, and create more symbiotic monsters with help from Loki, but is foiled by Harry, Spider-Man and Doc Ock's Anti-Venom formula, and the Avengers respectively. A piece of the symbiote that survived fighting the Avengers later bonds with the Scorpion and eventually Thompson, who shows an unusual amount of control over it and becomes Agent Venom for the rest of the series.
- Venom appears in Phineas and Ferb: Mission Marvel, voiced by Danny Trejo.
- Venom appears in the Hulk and the Agents of S.M.A.S.H. episode "The Venom Within". Doctor Octopus creates a new version of the Venom symbiote that gradually assimilates the Agents of S.M.A.S.H. to absorb their gamma energy and destroy Spider-Man. However, the Agents of S.M.A.S.H. and Spider-Man eventually defeat it.
- Venom appears in Marvel Disk Wars: The Avengers, with Spider-Man's version voiced by Robbie Daymond.
- Venom appears in Lego Marvel Super Heroes: Maximum Overload, voiced by Dee Bradley Baker.
- Venom appears in Spider-Man (2017), with Spider-Man's version voiced again by Robbie Daymond, Eddie Brock's version voiced by Ben Pronsky, and the symbiote in its true form voiced again by Benjamin Diskin. This version was previously created from the remains of All-Black and aided the Klyntar in conquering other planets. Eventually, it ends up inside a meteorite, where it is eventually discovered by a space program, dubbed V-252, and sent to Horizon High for research. The symbiote briefly merges with Spider-Man from the episode "Sandman" until "Stark Expo", and Flash Thompson during the episode "Venom" before it is recaptured. In the second season, the symbiote merges with Eddie Brock, who renames it Venom in the episode "Dead Man's Party". In the episode "Venom Returns", Venom is incapacitated by an experimental sonic device during a failed attempt to publicly expose Spider-Man's secret identity, which leaves Brock in a coma. In the episode "Superior", Venom is reawakened by experimentation that alters its genealogy, enabling it to survive without a host, but it is defeated by Spider-Man. In the episodes "Web of Venom" Pt. 2 and "Amazing Friends", Venom is accidentally freed by Dr. Curt Connors and absorbs a synthetic copy. It returns to the meteorite and uses an energy seed to shoot a beacon into space. Despite being killed by Spider-Man, an army of Venom's fellow Klyntar invade the Earth, though they are ultimately defeated. In the series finale, "Maximum Venom", a fragment of Venom is revealed to have survived and bonded with Max Modell. Seeking revenge on Spider-Man for thwarting its race's invasion, it builds a portal to its home planet and summons more Klyntar, but they are defeated by Spider-Man's allies while Modell overcomes Venom's control and destroys its seed, permanently vanquishing the symbiote.
- A Battleworld incarnation of Venom appears in the Avengers Assemble episode "The Immortal Weapon". After the Beyonder forms Battleworld for an experiment, a satellite containing a Venom symbiote crashes into K'un-L'un, allowing it to escape, find its way to Dracula, and bond with him. Using his new powers, the vampire fights off Iron Fist, Black Panther, and Falcon before Iron Fist uses his powers to separate Dracula from the symbiote.
- Venom appears in the Guardians of the Galaxy episode "Drive My Carnage". A sample of it was held at Horizon High and possesses Spider-Man during the Guardians of the Galaxy's fight with a Carnage-possessed Thanos.
- Venom will appear in the second season of the Disney+ animated series Your Friendly Neighborhood Spider-Man.

=== Film ===
Venom's first appearance in a motion picture was originally planned for a titular film written by David S. Goyer and produced by New Line Cinema, in which Venom would have been portrayed as an antihero and Carnage as the antagonist. By 2007, the film rights to Venom were transferred to Sony Pictures.

In March 2012, Josh Trank was in talks to direct a new Venom film as a part of The Amazing Spider-Man film series. In December 2013, Sony officially announced two spin-offs of The Amazing Spider-Man film series, one of which was a Venom film called Venom: Carnage, written by Alex Kurtzman, Roberto Orci and Ed Solomon, with Kurtzman directing it. In September 2014, Kurtzman stated that they had been considering different incarnations of the character, including Eddie Brock, Anne Weying, and Flash Thompson. The film, along with the other spin-offs, was cancelled prior to the studios' contract agreement with Marvel Studios.

==== Spider-Man trilogy ====
Venom appears in Spider-Man 3, with Peter Parker's version portrayed by Tobey Maguire and Eddie Brock's version portrayed by Topher Grace. After landing on Earth, the symbiote bonds with Spider-Man until he eventually rejects it, after which it bonds with Brock and forms an alliance with Flint Marko to kill Spider-Man, only to be killed by Spider-Man via one of the New Goblin's pumpkin bombs.

In July 2007, Sony executive Avi Arad revealed a spin-off of Sam Raimi's Spider-Man trilogy focused on the still-alive Venom symbiote was in the planning stages, with Jacob Aaron Estes commissioned to write a script, tentatively entitled Venom. In September 2008, Rhett Reese and Paul Wernick signed on to write the film after Estes' script was rejected, while Gary Ross would direct. Variety reported that Venom would become an anti-hero in the film, and Marvel Entertainment would co-produce the film. This potential film was ultimately cancelled.

==== Sony's Spider-Man Universe ====
In March 2016, following the introduction of Spider-Man to the Marvel Cinematic Universe, it was announced that Sony was moving forward with a standalone film after hiring Dante Harper to write the script, and Arad, Matt Tolmach and Amy Pascal producing. The film was initially reported to have no connection to the MCU nor have any relation to Spider-Man; it would be set in its own continuity. A year later, Sony announced that Venom would be released on October 5, 2018, with Scott Rosenberg and Jeff Pinkner signed on as screenwriters. It was reported to be Rated R and the first in a series of Spider-Man character-related spin-off films called the "Sony Pictures Universe of Marvel Characters", later renamed to Sony's Spider-Man Universe. In May 2017, Tom Hardy was announced to be cast as Eddie Brock / Venom, with Ruben Fleischer attached to direct. Furthermore, Brad Venable provides additional sound effects and dialogue for the character. Carlton Drake / Riot appeared as the film's primary antagonist, as did Anne Weying, Brock's ex-wife from the comics. The film has been described by Fleischer as taking inspiration from the works of David Cronenberg and John Carpenter. The supporting cast also consists of Riz Ahmed, Michelle Williams, and Jenny Slate. Variety reported that Kelly Marcel would write the script with Pinkner and Rosenberg. Filming officially began on October 23, 2017. Venom was released in the United States on October 5, 2018, with a PG-13 rating.

A sequel, Venom: Let There Be Carnage was released in the United States on October 1, 2021. Loosely adapting the events of the "Maximum Carnage" comic book story arc and The Venom Saga from Spider-Man: The Animated Series, the film sees Venom and Brock having to battle Cletus Kasady / Carnage and Shriek while also learning how to better live and work together as the "Lethal Protector". The film's post-credits scene sees Eddie and Venom being transported to the Marvel Cinematic Universe (MCU), where they witness J. Jonah Jameson expose Peter Parker's identity as Spider-Man on television. This is continued in the mid-credits scene of the MCU film Spider-Man: No Way Home (2021), where, just as the pair begin to learn about the heroes and major events that occurred in this universe, they are taken back to their home dimension by Doctor Strange's spell along with other universe-displaced individuals; inadvertently leaving behind a piece of the symbiote.

==== Future ====
In February 2026, an animated film was announced to be directed by Zach Lipovsky and Adam Stein.

=== Video games ===
==== Spider-Man games ====
- The Eddie Brock incarnation of Venom appears as a boss in the Sega Mega-CD version of The Amazing Spider-Man vs. The Kingpin.
- The Eddie Brock incarnation of Venom appears as a playable character in Spider-Man and Venom: Maximum Carnage and Venom/Spider-Man: Separation Anxiety.
- The Eddie Brock incarnation of Venom appears as a boss in The Amazing Spider-Man: Lethal Foes.
- The Eddie Brock incarnation of Venom appears as the final boss of Spider-Man (1995).
- The Eddie Brock incarnation of Venom appears as a boss, later a supporting character, in Spider-Man (2000), voiced by Daran Norris.
- The Ultimate Marvel iteration of Eddie Brock / Venom appears as a playable character in and the final boss of Ultimate Spider-Man (2005), voiced by Daniel Capallaro and Arthur Burghardt respectively. Additionally, the symbiote suit is also available as an alternate skin for Spider-Man.
- The Eddie Brock incarnation of Venom appears in the Spider-Man 3 film tie-in game, voiced by Topher Grace. Similarly to the film, Spider-Man removes the symbiote after it becomes a negative influence on his behavior, only for it to then bond with Brock, who seeks revenge against both Spider-Man and Peter Parker. Adopting the alias Venom, he blackmails the Sandman into helping him kill Spider-Man, only to meet his demise in the ensuing fight.
- The Eddie Brock incarnation of Venom appears as a playable character in Spider-Man: Friend or Foe, voiced by Quinton Flynn.
- The Eddie Brock incarnation of Venom appears as the final boss of Spider-Man: Web of Shadows, voiced by Keith Szarabajka. A piece of the Venom symbiote splits off from him and bonds with Spider-Man, re-granting him access to his symbiote suit. Afterward, Venom gains the ability to self-replicate and leads a symbiote invasion. Eventually, Spider-Man appeals to Brock's better nature and, depending on the player's choices, will either kill Venom himself or allow Brock to sacrifice himself to do so.
  - In the PS2 and PSP versions of the game, Venom explodes after a fight with Spider-Man, spreading itself across New York. The Tinkerer subsequently captures Venom in an attempt to weaponize him.
  - In the Nintendo DS version, Venom is not the cause of the invasion. In his efforts to stop it, he allies himself with Spider-Man after the web-slinger defeats him.
- The Ultimate Marvel incarnation of the Venom symbiote suit appears in Spider-Man: Shattered Dimensions, in which Madame Web provides a copy of it to the Ultimate Spider-Man (voiced by Josh Keaton) and telepathically controls it to prevent it from consuming him.
- Two versions of the symbiote suit appear as alternate skins for Spider-Man in The Amazing Spider-Man (2012). One is based on its appearance in the Spider-Man 3 film and the other is a modified version of Spider-Man's costume from the film the game is based on. Backstory for the game also reveals that the game's version of Scorpion was created using a "black goo" recovered from space.
- The Venom symbiote appears in The Amazing Spider-Man 2. Oscorp runs a secret experiment at Ravencroft called the "Venom Project", using nanite-based regenerating body armor that grants enhanced strength. This project later gives Cletus Kasady the Carnage symbiote. The symbiote suit is also available as an alternate costume for Spider-Man via DLC.
  - The Eddie Brock incarnation of Venom appears in the mobile version of the game, voiced again by Benjamin Diskin.
- The Venom symbiote via Spider-Man, Eddie Brock, Anne Weying as She-Venom, Flash Thompson as Agent Venom, Angelo Fortunato, Otto Octavius as Superior Venom, Pork Grind, Lee Price as Maniac, and Inkling versions of Black Cat, Hammerhead, and Mac Gargan all appear as separate playable characters in Spider-Man Unlimited (2014). Additionally, the Eddie Brock incarnation of Venom appears as a boss in the "Symbiote Dimension" limited time event.
- A black, web-like, reactive substance later confirmed to be Venom appears in Spider-Man (2018). Norman Osborn places his terminally ill son Harry in a green vat containing the substance in an attempt to cure him.
- Venom appears as a playable character in and the final boss of Spider-Man 2 (2023), voiced by Tony Todd. In flashbacks, Oscorp obtained Venom and the meteorite he came to Earth in before Norman uses the former on Harry. In the present, believing Venom is an organic exosuit, Harry uses him to become a superhero and help Peter Parker until Parker is mortally wounded by Kraven the Hunter. Upon transferring himself to Parker to heal him, Venom negatively influences his personality and convinces him not to relinquish him until Miles Morales helps Parker remove Venom. While taking him to Curt Connors however, Venom re-bonds to Harry, kills Kraven, steals the meteorite, and launches a symbiote invasion until Parker, Morales, and Mary Jane Watson destroy the meteorite and kill Venom.

==== Other games ====
- The Eddie Brock incarnation of Venom appears as a playable character in Marvel vs. Capcom: Clash of Super Heroes.
- The Eddie Brock incarnation of Venom appears as a playable character in Marvel vs. Capcom 2: New Age of Heroes, voiced by Rod Wilson.
- The symbiote suit appears as an unlockable costume for Spider-Man in X-Men: Mutant Academy 2.
- The Eddie Brock incarnation of Venom appears as a playable character in Marvel Nemesis: Rise of the Imperfects, voiced by Jason Bryden.
- The Eddie Brock incarnation of Venom appears in the Xbox 360 version of Marvel: Ultimate Alliance, voiced by Steve Blum. He appears via the "Villains Pack" DLC. Additionally, the Angelo Fortunato and Mac Gargan incarnations and Venom's Ultimate Marvel design appear as alternate skins while the symbiote suit appears as an alternate skin for Spider-Man.
- The Eddie Brock incarnation of Venom appears in LittleBigPlanet via the "Marvel Costume Kit 3" DLC.
- The Mac Gargan incarnation of Venom appears as a boss and playable character in Marvel: Ultimate Alliance 2, voiced by Chopper Bernet. Additionally, Eddie Brock's incarnation appears as an alternate skin. In the game's story, Venom is among the villains placed under mind control using nanite technology to serve the heroes' cause and can be on either the pro-registration or anti-registration side. During a battle between the two factions, Venom is among the villains who attack S.H.I.E.L.D. agents and set up bombs after the nanites attain sentience.
  - In the PS3, Xbox 360, PS4, Xbox One, and PC versions, Venom is an unlockable playable character. In the story, the heroes fight Venom and the Green Goblin and eventually defeat and cure them.
- The symbiote suit appears as an unlockable costume for Spider-Man in Marvel vs. Capcom 3: Fate of Two Worlds.
- The Eddie Brock incarnation of Venom appears as a playable character in Marvel Super Hero Squad Online, voiced by Travis Willingham. Additionally, the symbiote suit also appears as an alternate skin for Spider-Man.
- The symbiote suit appears as an unlockable alternate skin for Spider-Man in Ultimate Marvel vs. Capcom 3.
- The Eddie Brock incarnation of Venom appears as a playable character in Marvel Avengers: Battle for Earth, voiced by Roger Craig Smith.
- The Eddie Brock incarnation of Venom appears as a playable character in Marvel Heroes, voiced by Neil Kaplan. The symbiote suit also appears as an alternate costume for Spider-Man.
- The Eddie Brock, Mac Gargan, and Flash Thompson incarnations of Venom all appear as a playable characters in Marvel Puzzle Quest.
- The Eddie Brock incarnation of Venom appears as a playable character and boss in Lego Marvel Super Heroes, voiced by Dave Boat. Additionally, the symbiote suit is available as an alternate skin for Spider-Man via DLC.
- The Eddie Brock incarnation of Venom appears as a playable character in Disney Infinity 2.0, voiced by Matt Lanter.
- The Eddie Brock incarnation of Venom appears as a playable character and occasional boss in Marvel Contest of Champions. Additionally, VenomPool (a mixture of Venom and Deadpool), Venom the Duck (a mixture of Venom and Howard the Duck), and the Symbiote Supreme (a mixture of Venom and Doctor Strange) also appear as playable characters.
- The Eddie Brock incarnation of Venom appears as a playable character in Marvel: Future Fight.
- The Eddie Brock incarnation of Venom appears in Disney Infinity 3.0, voiced again by Matt Lanter.
- The Eddie Brock incarnation of Venom appears as a playable character in Marvel Avengers Academy, voiced by Brian Stivale.
- The Eddie Brock incarnation of Venom appears as a downloadable playable character in Marvel vs. Capcom: Infinite, voiced by Andrew Morgado.
- The Eddie Brock and Flash Thompson incarnations of Venom appear as a playable characters in Lego Marvel Super Heroes 2.
- Venom appears in Marvel Powers United VR, voiced again by Ketih Szarabajka.
- The Eddie Brock incarnation of Venom appears as a boss and a playable character in Marvel Ultimate Alliance 3: The Black Order, voiced again by Steve Blum.
- The Eddie Brock incarnation of Venom appears as a non-player character, later a downloadable playable character, in Marvel's Midnight Suns, voiced by Darin De Paul.
- The Eddie Brock incarnation of Venom appears as a playable character in Marvel Rivals, voiced again by Steve Blum. Additionally, VEN#m appears as an alternate skin for SP//dr.
- The Eddie Brock incarnation of Venom appears as a playable character in Marvel Cosmic Invasion.
- The Eddie Brock incarnation of Venom appears as a playable character in Marvel Tōkon: Fighting Souls.

=== Miscellaneous ===
- The Eddie Brock incarnation of Venom appears in The Ultimate Spider-Man short story collection book as part of the short story "An Evening in the Bronx with Venom", by Keith R.A. DeCandido.
- The Eddie Brock incarnation of Venom appears in the Adi Shankar's Bootleg Universe fan film Truth In Journalism, portrayed by Ryan Kwanten and Denis Sergovskiy respectively. This version of the latter was realized via a suit created by Robert Pendergraft and the makeup effects house Aunt Dolly's Garage, based on Todd McFarlane's original Venom sketches, with Rainfall Films designing a computer-generated head and tendrils. For the film's "vomit" scene, Rainfall concocted a mixture of maple syrup, soy sauce, and flour, which was shot separately and digitally inserted into the scene.

== Reception ==
Originally David Michelinie planned to kill Venom in Amazing Spider-Man #400, and have other villains become the host. However, due to the popularity of the character Marvel would not allow this, leading him to create Carnage instead.

Comics journalist and historian Mike Conroy writes of the character: "What started out as a replacement costume for Spider-Man turned into one of the Marvel web-slinger's greatest nightmares." Venom was ranked as the 22nd Greatest Comic Book Villain of All Time in IGN's list of the top 100 comic villains. IGN also ranked Mac Gargan's incarnation of Venom as #17 in their list of "The Top 50 Avengers", while the Flash Thompson incarnation was ranked as #27. The character was listed as #33 on Empire's 50 Greatest Comic Book Characters and was also ranked at #8 in Marvel's Top 10 Spider-Verse Characters. Spike Chunsoft and Danganronpa mascot Monokuma was designed by Rui Komatsuzaki and Kazutaka Kodaka to partially resemble Venom.

=== Legacy ===
The Australian spider Venomius is named after the character, with the species name (V. tomhardyi) referencing Tom Hardy's portrayal of the character.

An original page of the 1984 Marvel Superheroes Secret Wars, showing Spider-Man wearing the black suit for the first time, was sold by Heritage Auctions in January 2022 for over $3 million. At the time, it was the highest price paid for a single comic-book page at an auction.

== See also ==
- List of Venom titles
