= Symbiote (comics) =

Fictional race in Marvel Comics

Symbiotes
- Two symbiotic characters, Venom (above) and Carnage (below), battling each other in the textless cover of Venom #27 (August 2020). Art by Clayton Crain.

Publication information
- Publisher: Marvel Comics
- First appearance: The Amazing Spider-Man #252 (May 1984)
- Created by: Roger Stern; Tom DeFalco; Mike Zeck; David Michelinie

Characteristics
- Place of origin: Gorr's unnamed planet; later moved to Klyntar
- Pantheon: Knull
- Notable members: See List of symbiotes
- Inherent abilities: Symbiosis with a host provides superhuman strength, speed, agility, and endurance; gains characteristics of host; amplifies original powers and traits of hosts

The symbiotes are a fictional species of extraterrestrial fluid-like life forms appearing in American comic books published by Marvel Comics, most commonly in association with Spider-Man. The symbiotes form symbiotic bonds with their hosts, through which a single entity is created. They are able to alter their hosts' personalities and memories, often influencing their darkest desires; amplify their physical and emotional traits and personality; and grant them super-human abilities. The symbiotes are also weakened when in range of extreme sounds or sonic frequencies. There are more than 40 known symbiotes in the Marvel Universe.

The first and most well-known symbiote is Venom, who originally attaches itself to Spider-Man during the 1984 Secret Wars miniseries. After Spider-Man rejects it, the symbiote bonds with his rival, Eddie Brock, with whom it first becomes Venom, though it still possesses the powers of Spider-Man. The character has since endured as one of Spider-Man's archenemies, though he has also been occasionally depicted as an antihero. Other characters have later merged with the Venom symbiote, including the villain Mac Gargan, and Flash Thompson, who became the superhero Agent Venom. Other well-known symbiotes are Carnage, an offspring of Venom who, when merged with its most infamous host, Cletus Kasady, has served as an enemy of both Spider-Man and Venom; and Anti-Venom, which originates when the Venom symbiote re-merged with Brock after being separated from him, gaining a new white appearance and additional powers.

Since their conception, the symbiotes have appeared in various media adaptations, including films, television series, and video games. Venom is the symbiote with the most appearances, appearing in the 2007 film Spider-Man 3, and as the titular protagonist of the 2018 film Venom. Carnage also made its cinematic debut in the film Venom: Let There Be Carnage (2021). Additional symbiotes debuted in the 2024 film Venom: The Last Dance.

== Publication history ==
The first appearance of a symbiote occurs in The Amazing Spider-Man #252, The Spectacular Spider-Man #90, and Marvel Team-Up #141 (released concurrently in May 1984), in which Spider-Man brings one home to Earth after the Secret Wars (Secret Wars #8, which was months later, details his first encounter with it). The concept was created by a Marvel Comics reader; the publisher purchased the idea for $220. The original design was then modified by Mike Zeck, at which point it became the Venom symbiote. The concept has since been explored and used throughout multiple storylines, spin-off comics, and derivative projects.

== Depiction ==
=== Fictional history ===
The cover of Secret Wars #8, which details Spider-Man's first encounter with the black costume.

Symbiotes are created by an ancient malevolent primordial deity named Knull. When the Celestials begin their vast plan to evolve the universe, Knull, seeing that his "Kingdom" is being touched, retaliates by constructing All-Black, the first symbiote, and subsequently cuts off a Celestial's head. The other Celestials then banish Knull, along with the severed Celestial head, deeper into space. After that, he starts using the head's cosmic energies as a forge for the symbiotes, which is how they develop the weaknesses to sound and fire. The head later becomes an interdimensional crossroads and laboratory, Knowhere. Knull then embarks on a campaign of genocide against the other gods. During a battle with the gods, he crashes on a desolate planet where All-Black leaves him and goes to Gorr, drawn to his murderous hate, who tried to kill Knull. After recovering, Knull created an army of symbiotes called the Symbiote Imperium, which he used to conquer planets and destroy entire civilizations. However, when the symbiote dragon Grendel journeyed to Earth, Thor defeated it and destroyed the connection between Knull and the symbiotes. Subsequently, the symbiote hive-mind began to explore notions of honor and nobility as it bonded to benevolent hosts. The symbiotes subsequently rebelled against their god, imprisoning him at the heart of an artificial planet in the Andromeda Galaxy they called Klyntar, from which they derived the name of their species. However, these altruistic goals were imperfect, as the Klyntar symbiotes could be corrupted by hosts with harmful chemical imbalances or problematic personality traits, turning them into destructive parasites that would spread lies and disinformation about their own kind to make other people fear and hate the Klyntar species as a whole. The corrupted Klyntar started taking over planets, creating the Imperium.

During the Kree-Skrull War, the Kree wanted to replicate the Skrull's shapeshifting abilities; they acquired a newborn symbiote which had been outcast from its species on the planet where Knull had created them. They recruited the Kree Tel-Kar to be bonded to the young symbiote, and modified both Tel-Kar and the symbiote so that he could have full control over it. He infiltrated the Skrulls using the symbiote's shapeshifting ability, but was discovered. He deleted the symbiote's memories and separated himself from it. The symbiote then reunited with the parasitic symbiotes, retaining little memory of its first host. When the corrupted symbiotes found out that this symbiote wanted to commit to its host rather than exploit it as they tended to do, they decided that it was insane and trapped it in a canister to be condemned to die on a planet that would later become part of Beyonder's Battleworld. There, it would be encountered by Spider-Man in the 1984 miniseries Secret Wars. In that story, which saw the heroes of Earth transported to this planet to battle their archenemies, Spider-Man sought to repair or replace his tattered costume, which had been damaged in battle, and was directed by Thor and Hulk to a device inside the alien compound that they had come to use as headquarters. Mistaking the device in which the symbiote was imprisoned for the device Thor and Hulk mentioned, Spider-Man activated it, freeing the symbiote, which appeared before him as a black sphere that enveloped his body and took on the form of a black version of his costume that could respond to his mental commands. Spider-Man assumed that the device produced clothing designed to do this. Spider-Man returned to Earth with the symbiote, where, after discovering that it was an alien lifeform that wanted to bond with him, he managed to separate himself from it by using sound waves to hurt the creature, which took refuge in a church's bell tower. It later bonded with Eddie Brock, who went to the church, despondent and vengeful after his journalism career was destroyed because he incorrectly identified the serial killer known as Sin-Eater as a man who later turned out to be a compulsive confessor; he blamed this turn of events on Spider-Man. Having bonded with the symbiote, the two became the being known as Venom. During this time, it spawned seven offspring and a clone; its first child later had three of its own, producing the symbiotes Carnage, Scream, Lasher, Phage, Agony, and Riot.

The Venom symbiote eventually became too much for Eddie to handle, and he separated himself from it. Venom was later bonded to Flash Thompson as part of Project Rebirth. Thompson originally struggled to control the symbiote, who developed a slight affection for him. It is later established that the host's mental state affects the symbiote just as much as the other way around.

=== Culture ===
The symbiotes, when they are created, are used as tools by Knull to conquer the universe. At the time, they have a symbiote dialect. When they are freed from Knull's control and begin learning about compassion, they establish the lie about their nature to redeem themselves. They form the Agents of Cosmos, symbiotes bonded to benevolent hosts, forming noble warriors who try to maintain peace across the universe. However, some symbiotes are corrupted by malevolent hosts, turning them back into monsters and reestablishing the symbiote Imperium first formed by Knull; these symbiotes are cut from the Klyntar hive mind. The symbiote Imperium conquers planets and infects their inhabitants to drain and consume them.

The symbiotes in general do not have a proper culture. As seen with Venom and Carnage, the symbiote's personality and psychology depend largely on the host's nature, as the link between the host and the symbiote is what gives the symbiote a purpose and meaning to their life.

As for the Nameless, a group of Kree explorers infected by the Exolon parasites, after being infected by the parasites, which consumed their souls, they lose all sense of time and sentience and start engaging in gruesome self-inflicted pain rituals to remember their past lives.

=== Biology ===
The symbiote bonding with a host, which it needs to survive

The symbiotes are an alien species of inorganic, amorphous and multicellular symbiotic parasites formed from Knull's "Living Abyss". They record the genetic material of each of their hosts in a genetic codex. They also empower a host's natural abilities to the point that they far exceed those of normal members of the host's species. These abilities include the following:

- Superhuman strength (strong enough to lift 50 tons or more), speed, endurance, agility, healing powers, and intelligence
- Genetic memory, allowing them to recall information from previous hosts. They also leave traces of themselves, called a codex, attached to the host's DNA, to send information to the hive mind.
- The ability to negate damage caused by terminal illnesses and permanent injuries. While symbiotes can somewhat heal their hosts, they generally seek to force their hosts to depend on them in order to ensure their own survival. For example, Eddie Brock was able to survive indefinitely with terminal cancer, and Scott Washington was able to walk despite being paraplegic. Similarly, Flash Thompson and Cletus Kasady had received "legs" when bonded with the Venom symbiote and Carnage symbiote even though they had lost their legs. Wraith was able to use his Exolon powers to cure the Kree who were infected by the Phalanx.
- They can reproduce asexually with a limited number of seeds inside their mass.
- Senses that extend over its entire surface, enabling hosts to "see" what is behind them or otherwise not in their line of sight (like a Spider-Sense).
- The ability to change shape and size at will. This ability functions regardless of the host's actual stature and bodily dimensions, as the symbiotes are living tesseracts. This includes expanding to any size as long as they have something to grow on, such as a host or an object. Symbiotes can form multi-layered shields against powerful attacks and fit inside of small areas, such as electric wires and the insides of cars, to completely disable them. This shapeshifting allows the symbiote to change its color and texture, which allows it to blend into the environment as a form of camouflage, or to change the host's outward appearance (including mimicking the appearances of other beings).
- The ability to sense the thoughts and will of the host. When Spider-Man was originally selected, he had been thinking about Spider-Woman's costume in the Secret Wars. The symbiote acted on this and formed a similar costume to hers and Knull's emblem, which is the one seen on Spider-Man and Venom.
- The ability to excrete matter that enters in its body, like bullets, turning them into the green saliva
- Immortality, as evidenced by Venom 2099, which was still alive in the year 2099, and All-Black, which was created in the beginning of the universe and was still alive in King Thor's timeline.
- The ability to merge with other symbiotes or otherwise absorb one another. This is similar to how Hybrid was formed, or when Carnage absorbed another symbiote, regenerating itself. The symbiote can also absorb the codices of other symbiotes, obtaining their genetic memory - for example, when Spider-Man bonded to two other symbiotes, they absorbed Venom's codex, allowing them to appear exactly like Venom.
- The ability to force their hosts into a comatose state, as shown with Zak-Del and Eddie Brock
- The ability to prolong their host's life by replacing their failing organs with simulacrums manifested from their living abyss - however, they cannot do this indefinitely

Because they record the genetic material of each of its hosts, there are also additional powers that have been demonstrated, but are not necessarily universal to all symbiotes:

- The ability to block parts of the host's mind - Venom and all its descendants possess the ability to bypass Spider-Man's Spider-Sense; because the original symbiote was attached to Peter Parker (Spider-Man) first, it took his genetic information and replicated his powers.
- The ability to form fangs or simple bladed weapons out of their limbs. The first appearance of this was the Carnage symbiote.
- The ability to form tendrils and tentacles of various lengths from their body
- The ability to form wings, as shown when Venom came into contact with Knull and grew a pair of web-like wings; in some cases the symbiote has also been shown to form gliding wings.
- In the case of the purified Klyntar, cosmic awareness, which allows the Agents of Cosmos to sense people in need
- The ability to project the surface of the symbiote to attack at a distance
- The ability to sustain its humanoid body even without a host, but only for a certain period of time
- The ability to stick to walls (adapted from Spider-Man)
- The ability to produce acid, toxins, and venoms, like the venomous bite Venom delivered to Sandman (see Venom, Agony, and Venom 2099)
- The ability to produce webbing from its own mass (adapted from Spider-Man)
- The ability to sense the presence of other beings within a certain distance
- The ability to protect hosts from Ghost Rider's Penance Stare and the Inheritors's life-absorbing touch
- The ability to create storage portals inside of themselves (this allowed Peter Parker to stow and access his camera)
- The ability to filter breathable air for its host, allowing them to breathe underwater (seen in Vengeance of Venom), inhale poisonous fumes, and even survive in the vacuum of space
- The ability to transfer symbiote traits to its host - for example, when Carnage ate Karl Malus and he became a symbiote-human hybrid
- In the case of the Venom symbiote, the possession of empathic abilities, and the ability to project desires and needs into the thoughts of its host or potential hosts; this ability can also aid Venom in detecting the truth from those he interrogates.
- In some realities, the symbiote feeds on the emotions of its host, creating an increasingly hostile personality. The longer the host is exposed to the symbiote, the more overpowering this state of mind becomes.
- Each symbiote has its own unique abilities: Venom has a venomous bite; Toxin can change its shape and form into a Spider-Man-like build (slim, but strong) and Venom-like build (big and muscular) depending on its mood; Scream can use its web-like hair as a weapon; Agony can spit acid and manipulate matter; Phage can create bladed weapons; Lasher can create tendrils on its back; Riot can use bludgeoning weapons and agility; Payback can produce electricity; Scorn can fuse with technology; All-Black can grant its host immortality; and Sleeper can manipulate chemicals, providing limited telepathy and excellent cloaking abilities through pheromones.
- Some symbiotes are immune to sonic attacks and fire through modification, like Anti-Venom, Red Goblin, Mayhem, Payback, and Grendel.
- The ability to change the mood of its host by manipulating their brain chemicals
- The ability to replicate itself, as seen with Carnage and All-Black in the mainstream universe and Venom in Spider-Man Reign

However, the symbiotes also possess weaknesses that can be fatal. Some of these weaknesses include:

- A natural weakness to sonic attacks and heat-based attacks, which Knull unintentionally gave the symbiotes while they were being forged. However, symbiotes have a growing resistance to sound and fire due to their evolution. Still, there has not been an invulnerable symbiote in mainstream continuity, because the newest breeds can be harmed by incredible amounts of sonic waves and heat. Symbiotes, like Krobaa, are also seemingly vulnerable to light. The symbiotes in Ultimate Marvel are only vulnerable to the heat produced by high voltage electricity.
- Vulnerability to chemical and biological attacks - for example, Iron Man created a cure to a virus-like bio-weapon based on the Venom symbiote that was created by Doctor Doom. Venom and Carnage have shown susceptibility to chemical inhibitors. Whether a symbiote can mutate and reduce the effect of these weaknesses is unknown.
- Potential hosts with advanced healing factors, such as Wolverine, have shown resistance to symbiosis.
- In some incarnations, the symbiote is depicted as requiring a certain chemical (most likely phenethylamine) to stay sane and healthy, which can be found abundantly in two sources: chocolate and human brain tissue. Thus, the host is forced to either consume large amounts of chocolate or become a cannibal who devours the brains of those they kill. This peculiar trait has only been witnessed in the Venom symbiote. However, both Carnage and Toxin have threatened their enemies with aspirations to "eat their brains", as well as various other body parts. When Toxin teamed up with Spider-Man and Black Cat, he struggled to keep himself together, but told Spider-Man that he was only "joking" about eating the robbers' brains. Similarly, the Exolons feed on the immortal soul of the hosts, making the hosts immortal; however, this causes the host to descend into madness, as well making them forget all of their old memories unless they inflict pain to themselves in an attempt to keep their memories for longer (see Zak-Del and the Nameless).
- On at least one occasion, Spider-Man was able to exhaust the Venom symbiote by taking advantage of the fact that it made its webbing out of itself; after the symbiote had already used a great deal of webbing to bind him to a bell, Spider-Man forced Venom to use further webbing so that it would exhaust itself, like blood dripping from a wound (although the sheer amount of webbing that the symbiotes would need to use for this weakness to be exploited makes its use in a fight limited).
- The inability to bond to more than one host, as shown when Venom tried to bond to both Eddie and Peter at the same time and again with Flash and Eddie (although the Carnage symbiote did not display this weakness when bonding itself to people in Doverton, Colorado)
- Susceptibility to feelings - in the storyline Planet of the Symbiotes, Eddie Brock releases a cry of pain and agony so great that the entire symbiote race commits mass suicide, but how they kill themselves is not clear.
- The Xenophages, a race of extraterrestrial shapeshifters which prey on symbiotes, generate an unknown incendiary chemical that can paralyze them.
- Numerous occasions have shown that when a corrupted symbiote remains bonded to a host for too long, the symbiote will eventually consume the body of the host, leaving the host a dead husk (see the soldiers who were bonded to the Grendel symbiotes and with Peter Parker in two What If?!)
- When Eddie Brock was diagnosed with cancer, Martin Li used his Lightforce healing ability to cure him, accidentally producing white blood cells in Eddie's blood, which combatted the Venom's symbiote remnants; this created a new, non-sentient symbiote called Anti-Venom. Anti-Venom can cure illness and is corrosive to symbiotes.
- Vulnerability to the abilities of telepaths

== List of symbiotes ==
=== Major symbiote characters ===
The following symbiotes have appeared throughout several years of Spider-Man's history, appeared in multiple media such as film and video games, and were main characters/villains in story arcs.

Name	First appearance	Notable host	Description
Venom	The Amazing Spider-Man #300 (April 1988)	Peter Parker (Spider-Man)	Chronologically introduced in Marvel Super Heroes Secret Wars #8, merged with Spider-Man, and notably Eddie Brock. Mac Gargan then went on to be the symbiote's host for a while. Later, it was acquired by the government and was being used by Flash Thompson under the alias Agent Venom, until it separated from Flash and moved on to Lee Price, only to eventually return to Eddie Brock. It is revealed in Venom: First Host that a Kree soldier named Tel-Kar is chronologically the first host of Venom, prior to Spider-Man.
Venom	The Amazing Spider-Man #300 (April 1988)	Eddie Brock	
Venom	The Amazing Spider-Man #300 (April 1988)	Mac Gargan	
Venom	The Amazing Spider-Man #300 (April 1988)	Flash Thompson (Agent Venom)	
Venom	The Amazing Spider-Man #300 (April 1988)	Dylan Brock	
Venom	The Amazing Spider-Man #300 (April 1988)	Mary Jane Watson	
Carnage	The Amazing Spider-Man #361 (April 1992)	Cletus Kasady	A child-spawn of Venom bonded to serial killer Cletus Kasady through his bloodstream. The symbiote would occasionally be separated from Kasady and bond to other hosts, such as Ben Reilly and Karl Malus, only to be reunited with Kasady again.
Carnage	The Amazing Spider-Man #361 (April 1992)	Ben Reilly (Spider-Carnage)	A child-spawn of Venom bonded to serial killer Cletus Kasady through his bloodstream. The symbiote would occasionally be separated from Kasady and bond to other hosts, such as Ben Reilly and Karl Malus, only to be reunited with Kasady again.
Carnage	The Amazing Spider-Man #361 (April 1992)	Karl Malus (Superior Carnage)	A child-spawn of Venom bonded to serial killer Cletus Kasady through his bloodstream. The symbiote would occasionally be separated from Kasady and bond to other hosts, such as Ben Reilly and Karl Malus, only to be reunited with Kasady again.
Carnage	The Amazing Spider-Man #361 (April 1992)	Norman Osborn (Red Goblin)	A child-spawn of Venom bonded to serial killer Cletus Kasady through his bloodstream. The symbiote would occasionally be separated from Kasady and bond to other hosts, such as Ben Reilly and Karl Malus, only to be reunited with Kasady again.
Scream	Venom: Lethal Protector #4 (May 1993)	Various	In an attempt to create "super-cops" to police their new Utopia, the Life Foundation probed the Venom symbiote and extracted the last five of its "seeds", the materials used to create its spawn. These were cultured and bonded to five of the Life Foundation's best security personnel to form the Guardians: Donna Diego (Scream), Carl Mach (Phage), Leslie Gesneria (Agony), Trevor Cole (Riot), and Ramon Hernandez (Lasher).
Lasher	Venom: Lethal Protector #4 (May 1993)	Various	In an attempt to create "super-cops" to police their new Utopia, the Life Foundation probed the Venom symbiote and extracted the last five of its "seeds", the materials used to create its spawn. These were cultured and bonded to five of the Life Foundation's best security personnel to form the Guardians: Donna Diego (Scream), Carl Mach (Phage), Leslie Gesneria (Agony), Trevor Cole (Riot), and Ramon Hernandez (Lasher).
Phage	Venom: Lethal Protector #4 (May 1993)	Various	In an attempt to create "super-cops" to police their new Utopia, the Life Foundation probed the Venom symbiote and extracted the last five of its "seeds", the materials used to create its spawn. These were cultured and bonded to five of the Life Foundation's best security personnel to form the Guardians: Donna Diego (Scream), Carl Mach (Phage), Leslie Gesneria (Agony), Trevor Cole (Riot), and Ramon Hernandez (Lasher).
Agony	Venom: Lethal Protector #4 (May 1993)	Various	In an attempt to create "super-cops" to police their new Utopia, the Life Foundation probed the Venom symbiote and extracted the last five of its "seeds", the materials used to create its spawn. These were cultured and bonded to five of the Life Foundation's best security personnel to form the Guardians: Donna Diego (Scream), Carl Mach (Phage), Leslie Gesneria (Agony), Trevor Cole (Riot), and Ramon Hernandez (Lasher).
Riot	Venom: Lethal Protector #4 (May 1993)	Various	In an attempt to create "super-cops" to police their new Utopia, the Life Foundation probed the Venom symbiote and extracted the last five of its "seeds", the materials used to create its spawn. These were cultured and bonded to five of the Life Foundation's best security personnel to form the Guardians: Donna Diego (Scream), Carl Mach (Phage), Leslie Gesneria (Agony), Trevor Cole (Riot), and Ramon Hernandez (Lasher).
Hybrid	Venom: Along Came A Spider #1 (January 1996)	Scott Washington	The character was introduced as the fusion of four symbiotes (Lasher, Phage, Agony, and Riot), bonded to prison guard Scott Washington. Years later, Scream and Hybrid were hunted and killed by Eddie Brock, who was eliminating the "evil" of the symbiotes from the Earth. The Hybrid symbiote was able to survive and was taken in by the US Government, forcibly separated, and bonded to four soldiers to battle Carnage: Rico Axelson (Phage), James Murphy (Agony), Howard Ogden (Riot), and Marcus Simms (Lasher).
Toxin	Venom vs. Carnage #2 (September 2004)	Patrick Mulligan	A spawn of Carnage in the 1,000th generation that bonded with police officer Patrick Mulligan, becoming a hero. This was the first symbiote that Spider-Man considered an ally and it became something of a mentee of Spider-Man. It was later forcibly bonded to Eddie Brock by the Crime Master sometime after Mulligan's death.
Toxin	Venom vs. Carnage #2 (September 2004)	Eddie Brock	A spawn of Carnage in the 1,000th generation that bonded with police officer Patrick Mulligan, becoming a hero. This was the first symbiote that Spider-Man considered an ally and it became something of a mentee of Spider-Man. It was later forcibly bonded to Eddie Brock by the Crime Master sometime after Mulligan's death.
Toxin	Venom vs. Carnage #2 (September 2004)	Bren Waters	A spawn of Carnage in the 1,000th generation that bonded with police officer Patrick Mulligan, becoming a hero. This was the first symbiote that Spider-Man considered an ally and it became something of a mentee of Spider-Man. It was later forcibly bonded to Eddie Brock by the Crime Master sometime after Mulligan's death.
Anti-Venom	The Amazing Spider-Man #569 (October 2008)	Eddie Brock	A hybrid symbiote created accidentally when the codexes of the Venom symbiote in Eddie Brock's body were combined with his white blood cells by the mystical energies of Mister Negative. Unlike other symbiotes, Anti-Venom is completely mindless and Eddie Brock is in full control of his actions. Anti-Venom possesses healing powers and other powers that differ from the Venom symbiote, such as the ability to produce antibodies that can cure any known disease and remove any other impurities within a human body. Its touch is corrosive to other symbiotes.
Anti-Venom	The Amazing Spider-Man #569 (October 2008)	Flash Thompson (Agent Anti-Venom)	
Mania	Venom (vol. 2) #38 (July 2013)	Patricia Robertson (Venom)	An unstable clone of Venom created by the Arat corporation. Mania bonded to Patricia Robertson, who became the second She-Venom, but she was defeated by Eddie and Mania was absorbed into Venom. Eugene Thompson's neighbor in Philadelphia, Andi Benton, bonded with the clone to save her from Jack O'Lantern. In "Venom Inc", Lee Price, who was bonded to Venom, stole Mania and became Maniac. Eventually, Cletus Kasady absorbed the symbiote after killing Price.
Mania	Venom (vol. 2) #38 (July 2013)	Andi Benton	An unstable clone of Venom created by the Arat corporation. Mania bonded to Patricia Robertson, who became the second She-Venom, but she was defeated by Eddie and Mania was absorbed into Venom. Eugene Thompson's neighbor in Philadelphia, Andi Benton, bonded with the clone to save her from Jack O'Lantern. In "Venom Inc", Lee Price, who was bonded to Venom, stole Mania and became Maniac. Eventually, Cletus Kasady absorbed the symbiote after killing Price.
Mania	Venom (vol. 2) #38 (July 2013)	Lee Price (Maniac)	An unstable clone of Venom created by the Arat corporation. Mania bonded to Patricia Robertson, who became the second She-Venom, but she was defeated by Eddie and Mania was absorbed into Venom. Eugene Thompson's neighbor in Philadelphia, Andi Benton, bonded with the clone to save her from Jack O'Lantern. In "Venom Inc", Lee Price, who was bonded to Venom, stole Mania and became Maniac. Eventually, Cletus Kasady absorbed the symbiote after killing Price.
Knull	Venom (vol. 4) #3 (August 2018)	No host	A primordial god of darkness who created the symbiotes. He used the first symbiote, All-Black, to kill a Celestial and used the head's cosmic properties to form a suit of symbiote-armor while embarking on his deicidal crusade.
Sleeper	Venom: First Host #3 (September 2018)	Tel-Kar	Sleeper is Venom's child, who was born while he was imprisoned at Alchemax. After the Venom symbiote is stolen by its first host, Tel-Kar, Sleeper bonds to Eddie to help him save Venom. In the battle against Tel-Kar, Sleeper briefly bonds to M'Lanz, and her and Eddie return to Earth with Venom, where she leaves them. When Tel-Kar returns to Earth and tries to kill Eddie, Sleeper intervenes and bonds with Tel-Kar, lobotomizing him in the process.
Sleeper	Venom: First Host #3 (September 2018)	Rick Jones	Sleeper is Venom's child, who was born while he was imprisoned at Alchemax. After the Venom symbiote is stolen by its first host, Tel-Kar, Sleeper bonds to Eddie to help him save Venom. In the battle against Tel-Kar, Sleeper briefly bonds to M'Lanz, and her and Eddie return to Earth with Venom, where she leaves them. When Tel-Kar returns to Earth and tries to kill Eddie, Sleeper intervenes and bonds with Tel-Kar, lobotomizing him in the process.
Meridius	Free Comic Book Day 2021: Spider-Man/Venom #1 (August 14, 2021)	No host	The main villain of the 2021 Venom series, he is a time traveling King in Black with a grudge against Eddie Brock. He is eventually revealed to be a future version of Eddie Brock along with the other Kings in Black.
The Eventuality	Venom (vol. 5) #1 (November 2021)	No host	The seventh and final future incarnation of Eddie Brock.
Rascal	Red Goblin #1 (February 8, 2023)	Normie Osborn	Introduced during the "Dark Web" storyline, Harry Osborn's son Normie receives a piece of a symbiote from Dylan Brock in his journey to find his father Eddie. Taking inspiration from his grandfather Norman Osborn when he possessed Carnage, Normie uses Rascal to reclaim the Osborn name and clean up the mess Norman left from the "Go Down Swinging" storyline. Rascal differs from other symbiotes since its recent creation does not have the knowledge of the Klyntar or Knull.

=== Other symbiote characters ===
The following symbiotes have made only a few other appearances in comic books and are usually excluded from adaptations in other media.

Name	First appearance	Description
Mister E	Marvel Spotlight (vol. 2) #9 (November 1980)	A symbiote who previously fought Steve Coffin when he was briefly Captain Universe. It later resurfaced in the "King in Black" storyline, where it fought Spider-Man and Black Knight.
Rune-Venom	Rune vs Venom #1 (December 1995)	A leftover symbiote from the Planet of the Symbiotes arc, who bonded with the vampiric Rune and tried to frame Venom for murdering civilians. He was later defeated by Venom, after Rune consumed his symbiote due to its influence.
Krobaa	Venom: Seed of Darkness #1 (July 1997)	This symbiote was bonded to a scientist who drove him mad and went on a destructive rampage across the city. Eddie used his camera's flash to defeat the creature.
Big Mother	Captain Marvel (vol. 4) #20 (June 2001)	A Symbiote that would become the alleged mother of Grendel.
Neo-symbiote	Spider-Man Family (vol. 2) #3 (August 2007)	When Mac Gargan encountered Scorpion (Carmilla Black), he was outraged after finding out she was using the Scorpion name and attacked her. However, Carmilla used her stinger to create a neo-symbiote from Venom's webbing, which proved to be harmful to the Venom symbiote. The symbiote dies because Camilla's body is too toxic to sustain it.
Exolon	Annihilation: Conquest: Wraith #2 (October 2007)	The Exolon – created by Knull – are parasites which feed on the souls of living creatures. These parasites infected some Kree explorers, turning them into the Nameless and inhabiting The Exoteric Latitude thousands of years ago. Zak-Del is eventually infected and becomes one of them.
Venom Symbiote Virus	Mighty Avengers #7 (January 2008)	When Doctor Doom got a sample of the Venom symbiote, he created a virus-like symbiote bio-weapon, but it accidentally spread into New York and bonded to various civilians, as well as heroes such as Spider-Man, Spider-Woman, Black Widow, Wolverine, Doctor Strange, Hawkeye and Wasp. Iron Man eventually finds a cure and frees everyone from the symbiote virus.
Payback	True Believers (September 2008)	Bonded to a more evolved cousin of normal race of symbiotes. Is currently a vigilante and head of the True Believers.
ZZZXX	X-Men: Kingbreaker #2 (March 2009)	A brain-eating symbiote that was discovered several years ago by Shi'ar emperor D'Ken. Unlike other symbiotes, ZZZXX was a mutant symbiote and did not bother to ask permission from or care to know his host. After being experimented and tamed, it bonded to Raza Longknife and became a Praetorian Guard. The Nova Corps later captured ZZZXX and surgically removed it from Raza.
Scorn	Carnage #5 (August 2011)	Originally a piece of Carnage recovered after his apparent destruction by Sentry. The piece was used to develop an advanced prosthetic arm used by Tanis Nieves. After she rejected its attempt to bond with her, it became attached to Shriek but grew fearful of her. Nieves accepted its desire to return to her and bonded with the symbiote to become Scorn.
Symbiote Warriors	Venom (vol. 2) #13 (April 2012)	Four clones of X-23 who were bonded to symbiote pieces – seemingly from Toxin. They are all killed by Laura.
Black Berserkers	Thor: God of Thunder #1 (January 2013)	Creatures created by Gorr using All-Black to help him in his quest to kill all of the universe's gods.
All-Black the Necrosword	Thor: God of Thunder #2 (January 2013)	The first symbiote ever created from the shadow of the evil deity Knull and tempered using the divine power of a slain Celestial head. It takes the form of a sword made from living darkness and responds to intense negative emotions, often corrupting its user into committing divine atrocities. After taking The All Black from Knull, Gorr was corrupted by the symbiote and continues the "God killing spree" started by Knull, becoming Gorr the God Butcher.
Marcus	Deadpool: The Gauntlet #8 (February 2014)	An ancient centaur/werewolf hybrid bonded to a black symbiote, Marcus was hired by Dracula to be a member of the New Frightful Four.
Endo-Sym Armor	Superior Iron Man #1 (November 2014)	When Tony Stark's personality was switched during the "AXIS" storyline he created the Armor Mark 50 or The Endo-Sym Armor. This armor was an artificial symbiote based on the Venom symbiote, but it lacked traditional symbiote weaknesses. Tony controlled the artificial symbiote through a device which it reads his thoughts. This symbiote did not have a mind of his own like the original symbiotes. When Tony's mind returned to normal following the "Secret Wars" storyline, he got rid of this armor.
Agents of the Cosmos	Guardians of the Galaxy #23 (March 2015)	An organization of noble warriors from various species that were sought out by symbiotes to act as champions, dedicated to protecting those in need and capable of maintaining peace across the universe. Flash Thompson was formerly a member of this organization when he possessed the Venom symbiote. Following the departure of Agent Venom and Tarna from the organization, the Agents of the Cosmos were attacked and killed by the Poisons.
Karl Malus	Captain America: Sam Wilson #3 (November 2015)	After being consumed by Carnage during the events of Superior Carnage, Malus emerged as a symbiote/human hybrid.
Tarna	Venom Spaceknight #2 (February 2016)	A female Skrull who was part of the Agents of Cosmos and was bonded to a purple symbiote. She assisted the Flash from DC with Venom and after an argument, Venom nearly killed the purple symbiote. The symbiote would be separated from Tarna to be bonded to another host.
Raze	Carnage #10 (September 2016)	Spawned by Carnage and bonded with former FBI special agent Claire Dixon as part of a ritual involving the Darkhold. The symbiote was eventually absorbed into the Toxin symbiote so that it could defeat the newly resurrected Chthon.
Scorpion	Amazing Spider-Man #792 (December 2017)	An offshoot of Venom created when Lee Price had a sample of the Venom symbiote merge with Scorpion.
Killer Thrill	X-Men Blue #21 (February 2018)	A woman who bonded with a sadistic symbiote after purchasing it from a poacher. Before becoming Killer Thrill, she had come into conflict with Drax the Destroyer. She led her team of bounty hunters on a mission to kidnap the Starjammers and sell them to the highest bidder. Killer Thrill enjoyed torturing her captives with her symbiote powers, which enhanced her telepathic abilities and allowed them to become more powerful when she got excited. She was defeated during a battle with Venom and the X-Men and was killed when her symbiote was taken over by a Poison.
X-Men Blue	X-Men Blue #21 (February 2018)	When Cyclops' father and the Starjammers were captured by symbiote-bonded bounty hunters, the young X-Men forced Eddie Brock to help them, since he was bonded to Venom. After going to space, they found a poacher who had sold the symbiotes to the bounty hunters and, during the fight that ensued, the X-Men accidentally became bonded to symbiotes. When they started fighting the bounty hunters, Poisons arrived and consumed them. The X-Men survived and gave their symbiotes to the Starjammers to send them to their home.
Symbiote Dragons	Venom (vol. 4) #1 (May 2018)	Dragon-like Symbiotes created by Knull.
Grendel	Venom (vol. 4) #1 (May 2018)	Grendel is an ancient dragon-like symbiote created by Knull to destroy gods and civilizations. When Grendel arrived on Earth, it was defeated by Thor and trapped in ice. Years later, Nick Fury frees Grendel and uses it to create symbiote-enhanced supersoldiers, dubbed Sym-soldiers, to fight in the Vietnam War.
Tyrannosaurus	Venom (vol. 4) #2 ()	Tyrannosaurus is among the symbiotes created by Nick Fury upon having a Symbiote sample extracted from Grendel and bonded to soldier Rex Strickland. Following Strickland's death, Tyrannosaurus assumes a form resembling him.
N'Jadaka	Black Panther (vol. 7) #4 (September 2018)	2,000 years in the future, N'Jadaka – a man named after Erik Killmonger's real name – and his team were exploring the other planets to expand the Wakanda Empire in the Galaxy. While exploring a planet, they were attacked by the Between. He and his men were trying to survive when he encountered a symbiote. He bonded to the symbiote because they hated the current Wakandan Emperor who had sent N'Jadaka to be killed, because he had rendered the symbiotes an endangered species. With its power, he killed the Shadow People and the Emperor and became the new ruler of Wakanda. He and the symbiote then killed the current Avatar of Bast and became the new Avatar.
Magic Venom	Venom (vol. 4) #13 (June 2019)	During "The War of the Realms" event after Eddie Brock was separated from Venom, he with his son Dylan were approached by one of Malekith's War Witches. She gave Eddie one of the Dark Elves' Dreamstones, in the hope of recruiting Eddie into Malekith's army. The Dreamstone turned into an artificial symbiote, similar to Venom but without a mind of its own. Eddie eventually bonded pieces of the suit to civilians to save them from the invasion.
Void Knight	Silver Surfer: Black #2 (September 2019)	During a confrontation between Knull and the Silver Surfer, Knull infected the Surfer with his Abyss, turning him into his Void Knight. However, Ego freed the Silver Surfer from Knull's control, destroying the symbiote and allowing him to escape.
Extrembiote	King in Black #2 (December 2020)	Iron Man used a sample of Extremis on a Symbiote Dragon that formed this new Symbiote while also merging with the Iron Man Model 70 armor.
Plague	King in Black: Planet of the Symbiotes #1 (January 2021)	A symbiote used by Knull to bond with the long dead serial killer Cortland Kasady, Knull's most faithful servant, reanimating Cortland in the process.
Silence	Extreme Carnage: Phage #1 (July, 2021) (Unnamed) Extreme Carnage: Lasher #1 (August, 2021)	Following the death of the Scream symbiote, Dr. Steven tried to revitalize the symbiote by harvesting samples from the skin and blood of its host, Andi Benton. However, when the process proved unsuccessful, Steven combined the remains of the Scream symbiote with a sample of Anti-Venom Serum, creating a new symbiote. When Andi was mortally wounded by Phage on the orders of Carnage, she bonded with the symbiote, thinking it was Scream. Dubbing itself Silence and characterizing itself as the absence of Scream, the symbiote took over Andi's body and handily defeated Phage using a version of Anti-Venom's cleansing touch, disconnecting it from the symbiote hive-mind.
Bedlam	Venom (vol. 5) #1 (November, 2021)	A large red-colored King in Black who acts as Meridius's enforcer. He is a future version of Eddie Brock who relapsed into his rage state.
Wilde	Venom (vol. 5) #1 (November, 2021)	A future version of Eddie Brock who is cynical and makes jokes to cope with his fate.
Tyro	Venom (vol. 5) #1 (November, 2021)	A future version of Eddie Brock who is subservient to Meridius.
Finnegan	Venom (vol. 5) #1 (November, 2021)	A future version of Eddie Brock who is shocked and depressed.
Skreem	Union #1 (briefly; December 2020) & #4 (full issue; May 2021)	An alias of The Choir before she joined The Union and after the symbiote took control of her.
Urinal Cake	Damage Control (vol. 4) #2 (September 2022)	A slovenly hedonistic Symbiote. It was later eaten by Rooster the Flerken.
Bedlam's Child	Historically: Thor (vol. 6) #27 (September 2022); Chronologically: Venom (vol. 5) #17 (March 2023)	A spawn of Bedlam that was created when Darkoth cut off a part of Bedlam.
Serpent	Thor (vol. 6) #28 (October 2022)	A Symbiote that was a fusion of Promethium and the Symbiote matter of Bedlam's Child.
Princess	Deadpool (vol. 9) #1 (November 2022)	A clone of the Carnage symbiote created by Harrower. It later developed a monstrous hyena-like form when it was adopted by Deadpool.
Misery	Cult of Carnage: Misery #1 (May 2023)	A fusion of the Carnage symbiote and the Anti-Venom symbiote that merged with Liz Allan.
Madness	Cult of Carnage: Misery #2 (June 2023)	Samples of Phage, Riot, Scream, Agony, Lasher, and Toxin were used to create Madness, a seven-headed gestalt symbiote.
Sliver	Venom (vol. 5) #23 (July 2023)	A symbiote spawned by either the Toxin symbiote or the Venom symbiote when they were attempting to rescue an Alchemax employee abducted by a man called No One who had a grudge against the corporation for the death of his son. After No One's warehouse burned down, Natasha Romanoff encountered the newly spawned symbiote amidst the wreckage and bonded to it. The symbiote would later take on the name of Sliver during the Venom War storyline.
Zombiote	Venom (vol. 5) #33 (May 2024)	Meridius manipulated Alchemax scientists into fusing the Mania traces in Lee Price's zombie form and the K-Formula to make the K-44 formula, which creates Zombiotes.
Arachniote	Venom War: Spider-Man #1 (August 2024)	A legendary Symbiote monstrosity with a lethal touch that is so dangerous that even Knull feared it.
Flicker	Venom War: Lethal Protectors #1 (September 2024)	A symbiote of indeterminate origin that was either claimed or created by Alchemax. It given to the new member of the Wild Pack, Lina Abbas, to be used in their mission to retrieve Shriek.
Symbie	Timeslide #1 (December 2024; cameo appearance); The Amazing Spider-Man vol. 7 #11 (September 2025; full appearance)	A small Symbiote.
Freedom	Eddie Brock: Carnage #8 (November 2025)	A Symbiote of indeterminate origin who got along with a rich woman named Melina.
Passenger	Web of Venom #1 (May 2026)	A Symbiote that fell to Earth in 1816 and was placed in a jar labeled "Passenger". It later merged with Boomerang to become Comeback.

== Other versions ==
=== Ultimate Marvel ===
In the Ultimate Marvel universe, Venom was created by Richard Parker and Edward Brock Sr., who were hoping to develop a protoplasmic cure for severe illnesses. Venom used Richard's DNA as the starting base; thus, himself and Peter are "related" to it. When bonding to a host, the organic matter that comprises the suit envelops the host, regardless of resistance, and temporarily blinds it, before encasing itself in a hard casing, similar to a pupa. When the host emerges, the suit then shifts its appearance and function to assist its host, such as creating eyes for it to see through; if bonded with an incompatible host, it tries to take it over, inducing a homicidal rage in the suit's attempt to feed itself. When bonded with a host and forcibly removed, the suit leaves trace amounts of itself in their bloodstream, which attracts other samples of Venom and allows it to overload Peter's spider-sense. Venom's only known weakness is electricity.

The Ultimate Marvel version of Carnage was genetically engineered by Curt Conners and Ben Reilly from Peter's DNA based on Richard's research. Traces of the Venom suit remaining in Peter's blood give Carnage similar properties to those of the Venom suit. It also devours people, but does not require a host. When first introduced, the organism was a blob of instinct, with no intelligence or self-awareness, its only aim to feed on the DNA of others to stabilize itself.

=== Spider-Gwen ===
In Spider-Gwen's universe, Dr. Elsa Brock creates a cure to Harry Osborn's Lizard DNA by using Spider-Gwen's radioactive isotopes, given to her by S.I.L.K. Leader Cindy Moon. When Gwen injects the isotopes into Harry, the Lizard serum combines with the Spider isotopes and transforms into Venom. Venom then bonds to Spider-Gwen, which gives her her powers back and she becomes Gwenom. This symbiote, in its natural form, is made up of some spiders working together and is weak to sonic attacks only when bonded to a host; without a host, it is not susceptible to this weakness.

=== Amalgam Comics ===
In the Amalgam Comics universe, the Project Cadmus facility which created Spider-Boy started experimenting on a substance that they obtained from an alien spaceship. They inadvertently created a crystalline symbiote named Bizarnage (amalgamation of Carnage and Bizarro). It had the powers of Spider-Boy and started attacking everyone, until Spider-Boy defeated it.

=== MC2 ===
In the alternate universe of the Marvel Comics 2, or MC2 imprint, Norman Osborn obtained Eddie's blood (he was still bonded to Venom at the time) and extracted the symbiote codex. Norman then combined the codices with May's DNA and created a symbiote/human hybrid clone of Mayday Parker. The clone stayed in stasis inside a chamber until Peter, with Norman's mind, became Goblin God and awoke the hybrid. When Peter returned to normal, the hybrid, under the alias Mayhem/Spider-Girl, went to live with the Parker family, naming herself April Parker.

In a later timeline, Mayhem accidentally killed the real Spider-Girl and became a murderous vigilante after killing American Dream. The government, in an attempt to stop her, used pieces of the dead Carnage symbiote (after it had been killed by Mayday) to create living weapons dubbed Bio-Predators. The Bio-preds ran wild, decimating the world and its defenders. Mayhem, seeing the error of her ways, went back in time and sacrificed herself to stop her past self from killing Spider-Girl, ensuring the events that led to the Biopreds' creation never occurred, even though she may have survived.

=== "Spider-Verse" ===
During the 2014 "Spider-Verse" storyline, in Spider-Punk's universe, V.E.N.O.M, also known as Variable Engagement Neuro-sensitive Organic Mesh, was created by Oscorp and was worn by the Thunderbolt Department, the police and fire department of Norman Osborn, so that he could have full control over the city. However, they are all subsequently defeated by Spider-Punk using his guitar.

=== "Spider-Geddon" ===
During the 2018 "Spider-Geddon" storyline, in the universe of Peni Parker, aka SP//dr, VEN#m is a giant mech-suit, powered by a Sym Engine and created to serve as back-up in case the SP//dr failed. It was piloted by Addy Brock until, in a battle against a technological monster named M.O.R.B.I.U.S., the suit gained a conscience and went rogue. Though SP//dr is able to defeat VEN#m, she is too late to stop it from consuming Addy, as well as her version of Aunt May, who flew in to fix the problem manually.

=== What If... ===
==== ...Spider-Man had rejected the Spider? ====
"What if?: The Other", set during "The Other" storyline, features an alternative version of Peter who abandons the Spider when given the choice. Some time afterward, the Venom symbiote leaves its current host Mac Gargan and merges with Peter, who was inside a cocoon to become Poison. Poison, now calling himself "I", chooses Mary Jane to be his companion. He fails to gain her affection and digs up the grave of Gwen Stacy instead. The last images reveals Poison watching over a new cocoon like his own, as it bursts forth showing a hand similar to Carnage's, even though the normal symbiotes are unable to bond with dead hosts.

==== "Age of Apocalypse" ====
In a "What if?" "Age of Apocalypse" reality, in which both Charles Xavier and Eric Lensherr were killed, Apocalypse is served by clones of a symbiote Spider-Man who appear to be more symbiote than man.

=== Spider-Man: India ===
In Spider-Man: India, the symbiotes are parasitic demons with outward tusk-like fangs, who had ruled the world in the past but got trapped inside an amulet. The amulet was eventually found by Nalin Oberoi and transformed him into the Green Goblin. During a fight with Spider-Man, the Green Goblin releases a demon to possess Spider-Man, but is expelled. After the defeat of Green Goblin, the amulet is thrown into ocean, leaving Venom the only demon alive.

=== What The--?! ===
In the What The--?!, the Bee-Yonder gives Spider-Ham a version of the black uniform, but Spider-Ham likes his classic suit more, so he gets rid of it. In #20, Pork Grind, a pig version of Venom, is introduced as an enemy of Spider-Ham.

=== Contest of Champions ===
In the 2016 Contest of Champions series, where Maestro and Collector use the heroes of different worlds to battle with each other, when this version of Venom was killed by Punisher 2099, the remnants fused with the remains of the Void, creating the Symbioids.

=== Earth X ===
In the universe of Earth-9997 / Earth X, the symbiotes, like all sentient life, were created by the Celestials as "antibodies" to protect the embryos which resided in the core of the planets. Like the Asgardians and Mephisto, the symbiotes eventually reached the third stage of metamorphosis and became metaphysical entities, given physical form by what others believed them to be and required of them. The Venom symbiote was given form by Spider-Man, who believed it to be a symbiotic living costume; after being bonded to Eddie Brock for years, it bonded to Peter's daughter May Parker, who managed to tame and rehabilitate it to become a superhero.

=== Spider-Man Unlimited ===
In the Spider-Man Unlimited series, a Synoptic is introduced. Synoptics are parasites that can control organic beings via touch. Venom and Carnage, who act as double agents to the High Evolutionary, are able to revive the Synoptic.

=== Spider-Man: Spider's Shadow ===
In the 2021 miniseries Spider's Shadow, the symbiote manages to form a stronger bond with Peter after the Hobgoblin kills May Parker, which leads to Peter succumbing to its influence and killing several of his familiar rogues before the FF are able to expel the symbiote from him. Unfortunately, the symbiote is able to escape captivity and bond with Reed Richards, allowing its subsequent spawn to be altered so that they are immune to most of its traditional weaknesses. Despite these symbiotes managing to bond with various Avengers, X-Factor, and the rest of the FF, Peter and Johnny Storm are able to trick the original symbiote into trying to re-bond with Peter, only to reveal that it was pursuing Johnny while he was using an image inducer. The death of the prime symbiote destroys all of its spawn (although it kills Reed before its defeat).

=== Marvel Adventures ===
In the Marvel Adventures continuity, Venom is a "stealth fabric", a liquid alloy that can quickly adapt to the user's body. Sometime later, Reed Richards of the Fantastic Four analyzes the suit, concluding that it is using Spider-Man's body to power itself and will eventually drain him of his energy.

== In other media ==
=== Television ===
- The Venom and Carnage symbiotes appear in Spider-Man: The Animated Series.
- The Venom and Carnage symbiotes appear in Spider-Man Unlimited.
- The Venom symbiote appears in The Spectacular Spider-Man. Additionally, Carnage was also set to appear before the series was cancelled.
- The Venom, Carnage, and Anti-Venom symbiotes appear in Ultimate Spider-Man.
- A gamma variant of the Venom symbiote appears in the Hulk and the Agents of S.M.A.S.H. episode "The Venom Within".
- The Klyntar, Venom and Carnage symbiotes, and the Exolons appear in Guardians of the Galaxy. This version of the Klyntar's homeworld was destroyed by Thanos, who took them to Planet X to weaponize them by altering their genealogy.
- The Venom, Anti-Venom, Scream, Scorn, and Mania symbiotes, the Klyntar, and Grendel appear in Spider-Man (2017).
- An original symbiote named Syphon8r appears in the Moon Girl and Devil Dinosaur episode "The Borough Bully".

=== Film ===
- The Venom symbiote appears in Spider-Man 3.
- The Venom symbiote makes a cameo appearance in trailers for The Amazing Spider-Man 2, but was replaced with the Rhino's armor in the theatrical cut.

==== Sony's Spider-Man Universe ====
The Symbiotes appear in Sony's Spider-Man Universe:

- The Venom and Riot symbiotes appear in Venom. Additionally, a blue symbiote designated SYM-A02 and a yellow symbiote designated SYM-A03 make minor appearances.
- The Venom and Carnage symbiotes appear in Venom: Let There Be Carnage.
- The Venom, Toxin, Lasher, Lava, Animal, Tendril, Phage and Agony symbiotes, and Knull appear in Venom: The Last Dance.

==== Marvel Cinematic Universe ====
Elements of symbiote-related characters serve as inspiration for media set in the Marvel Cinematic Universe (MCU):

- Exolon monks appear in the live-action film Guardians of the Galaxy as followers of Ronan the Accuser.
- A Necrosword inspired by All-Black appears in the live-action film Thor: Ragnarok as Hela's primary weapon.
- Two Necroswords appear in the Disney+ animated series What If...? episode "What If... T'Challa Became a Star-Lord?", wielded by an alternate reality version of the Collector.
- The SSU incarnation of the Venom symbiote makes an uncredited cameo appearance in the mid-credits scene of Spider-Man: No Way Home.
- A non-symbiote Necrosword appears in Thor: Love and Thunder, wielded by Gorr the God Butcher.
- A symbiotic alien appears in Your Friendly Neighborhood Spider-Man, voiced by Kellen Goff.

=== Video games ===
- An infinite number of symbiote clones created by Doctor Doom serve as the collective final boss of Spider-Man: The Video Game.
- The Venom, Carnage, Scream, Agony, Riot, Lasher, and Phage symbiotes appear in Venom/Spider-Man: Separation Anxiety.
- Clones of the Carnage symbiote created by Doctor Octopus, in addition to the original, appear in Spider-Man (2000).
- The Venom symbiote appears in the Spider-Man 3 film tie-in game. Additionally, an unidentified symbiote bonded to Shriek appears in the PS2, PSP, and Wii versions of the game.
- The Venom symbiote, Klyntar, Snatchers, Zombies, Berserkers, Grapplers, Slashers, Electrolings, Vulturelings, and Symbiote Pods appear in Spider-Man: Web of Shadows.
- The Ultimate Marvel incarnations of the Venom and Carnage symbiotes appear in Spider-Man: Shattered Dimensions.
- The Anti-Venom symbiote appears in Spider-Man: Edge of Time.
- The Venom, Scream, Anti-Venom, and Hybrid symbiotes appear in Marvel Avengers Alliance.
- The Venom symbiote appears in Lego Marvel Super Heroes.
- A nanite-based incarnation of the Venom symbiote appears in The Amazing Spider-Man 2 film tie-in game.
- Numerous symbiote-related characters appear in Spider-Man Unlimited (2014). Additionally, a "Symbiote Dimension" appears as a stage.
- Clones of the Venom symbiote created by the Green Goblin and Mysterio appear in Disney Infinity 2.0.
- The Venom, Carnage, Anti-Venom and Scream symbiotes as well as Knull and symbiotes merged with Adaptoids called Symbioids appear in Marvel Contest of Champions.
- The Venom and Carnage symbiotes as well as original symbiotes Carrier, Horror, Demolisher, and Mutation appear in Marvel Puzzle Quest.
- The Klyntar appear in Marvel Avengers Academy.
- The Venom symbiote, several unnamed symbiotes, and a giant, unnamed symbiote appear in Marvel vs. Capcom: Infinite. Jedah Dohma uses the Soul Stone to steal a million souls from Earth and feed them to the giant symbiote in addition to giving pieces of it to A.I.M.brella, who bond them to virus-infected subjects to stabilize them. Spider-Man, Chris Redfield, Frank West, and Mike Haggar defeat Dohma, but he unleashes the creature on New Metro City. Nonetheless, the Avengers and heroes from the Capcom universe gather three of the Infinity Stones and use them to destroy the giant symbiote.
- The Venom and Carnage symbiotes, along with a hybridization of them called Carnom, appears in Lego Marvel Super Heroes 2.
- The Venom symbiote makes a cameo appearance in the ending of Marvel's Spider-Man (2018).
- The Venom symbiote makes a cameo appearance in the mid-credits scene of Spider-Man: Miles Morales.
- The Venom, Scream, and Anti-Venom symbiotes as well as several unnamed symbiote foot soldiers and Symbiote Behemoths created by Venom appear in Spider-Man 2.

=== Miscellaneous ===
- The Scream symbiote appears in The Amazing Adventures of Spider-Man.
- The Carnage symbiote appears in Spider-Man: Turn Off the Dark.
- On October 10, 2022, Marvel Comics announced the Summer of Symbiotes event for New York Comic Con in summer 2023.
