= Nick Fury Jr. =

Comic book character

- Character template for Captain America #6 (January 2026). Art by Valerio Schiti

Publication information
- Publisher: Marvel Comics
- First appearance: Battle Scars #1 (January 2012)
- Created by: Matt Fraction; Chris Yost; Scot Eaton; Cullen Bunn; Paul Neary (based on Ultimate Nick Fury by Brian Michael Bendis and Mike Allred)

In-story information
- Alter ego: Marcus Johnson
- Species: Human
- Team affiliations: S.H.I.E.L.D. Secret Avengers; United States Army; 75th Ranger Regiment
- Partnerships: Phil Coulson; Teresa Parker
- Notable aliases: Nick Fury
- Abilities: Skilled spy

Nicholas Joseph Fury Jr. (Sgt. Marcus Johnson), also referred to simply as Nick Fury (minus the Junior), is a fictional character appearing in American comic books published by Marvel Comics. He is a son and successor of former U.S. Army hero/super-spy and the intelligence agency S.H.I.E.L.D. director Nick Fury. The character first appeared in Battle Scars #1 (January 2012), which was written by Matt Fraction, Chris Yost, and Cullen Bunn, and penciled by Scot Eaton, and is an adaptation of Ultimate Nick Fury by Brian Michael Bendis and Mike Allred to the main Marvel continuity.

== Publication history ==
The character was introduced in the debut issue of the miniseries Battle Scars (January 2012), which was written by Matt Fraction, Chris Yost, and Cullen Bunn, and penciled by Scot Eaton. The character is an adaptation of the Ultimate Marvel version of Nick Fury and the Marvel Cinematic Universe incarnation as portrayed by Samuel L. Jackson and created by Brian Michael Bendis by Mike Allred (based on Jackson's likeness prior to Jackson portraying him); adapted as the son of the original white Nick Fury, synergetic with the MCU version.

Nick Fury Jr. returns in the 2013 Secret Avengers series by Nick Spencer and Luke Ross.

In January 2017, Marvel announced that the character would get his first ongoing solo series named Nick Fury.

In 2023 the character was the co-main character of the double sized one-shot Fury published to commemorate the character Nick Fury's 60th anniversary.

== Fictional character biography ==
Nick Fury Jr. in Battle Scars #6 (April 2012). Art by Scot Eaton.

Marcus Johnson was raised in Atlanta, Georgia, by Nia Jones. At age 18, Johnson passed on numerous college football scholarships to enlist in the US Army, serving in Iraq. After his enlistment, he earned a degree in philosophy from the University of Georgia. Johnson then re-enlisted in the Army, achieving the rank of staff sergeant.

While serving in Afghanistan with 2nd Battalion, 75th Ranger Regiment, Marcus is told that his mother was murdered back in the United States. He returns home and is attacked by the men who killed his mother, and by Taskmaster, but is saved. S.H.I.E.L.D. agents arrive and take him to one of their facilities; Johnson comes to feel he is being held there against his will and escapes, but is caught by Taskmaster once again. Before he can obtain any information, a man in a mask saves him, but then flees. Johnson catches up to Nick Fury Sr. who is revealed to be his father. Fury and Johnson are captured by the organization Leviathan's former member Orion, who has Johnson's left eye cut out and confirms that Johnson has the Infinity Formula in his DNA, which has been behind Fury's long lifespan. Fury helps Johnson escape, but Fury himself has blood transfused to Orion so Orion's youth can be restored, draining Fury's remaining Infinity Formula. Johnson saves Fury with the help of his Ranger friend Phil Coulson, and later kills Orion. After convalescing, Johnson is given the Super Soldier uniform to wear. As a new agent of S.H.I.E.L.D., he is also informed of his birth name Nick Fury Jr.

As part of the Marvel NOW! branding, Fury, Coulson, and Maria Hill form the S.H.I.E.L.D. version of the Secret Avengers with Hawkeye and Black Widow. Fury is involved in their first mission, which involved fighting a group of al-Qaeda terrorists. Fury then joins the Secret Avengers to raid Bagalia to recruit Taskmaster. While the Secret Avengers are fighting the Masters of Evil, Fury pays Crossfire to free Taskmaster from imprisonment. Fury and Daisy Johnson also dealt with the Iron Patriot armor has been programmed with a low-level A.I. and stolen by A.I.M.

During the "Civil War II" storyline, Fury is on a mission to neutralize a Hydra cell that is posing as a S.H.I.E.L.D. squadron. One of the visions of the Inhuman Ulysses Cain, which were believed to predict the future, indicated that the Hydra cell would launch a deadly attack on S.H.I.E.L.D. When heading to a base in Arizona, Fury is attacked by actual agents, instead of Hydra infiltrators as suspected. In order to find the traitors, Fury fakes his death and goes into hiding. Upon infiltrating the base Ogma, Fury downloads classified data, which leads him to the underground base Kratos. There, he encounters Leader, a rogue Life Model Decoy of his father who states that Cain's prediction does not involve the Hydra cell, and that it will cost him his life. Leader learns about Cain's abilities, and wants to neutralize Fury in order to take over S.H.I.E.L.D. In order to stop Leader, Fury destroys a central support beam that collapses Kratos, killing Leader. Upon surviving the collapse, Fury salvages Leader's head so that he can hack it and learn how he discovered his plan. Fury forgives Hill for sending him on a mission that would've resulted in his death, and states that he is not ready to return to S.H.I.E.L.D. yet.

In the aftermath of the "Secret Empire" story line, S.H.I.E.L.D. is disbanded, but Fury continues to work as an independent operative. Fury observes Frank Castle slay every Hydra agent in an abandoned warehouse as a way to atone for siding with Hydra. Fury then gives Castle access to the War Machine armor for a deniable operation against a rogue Eastern European state caught using old S.H.I.E.L.D. resources. He later imprisons Ripley Ryan (aka Star), bearer of the Reality Gem.

In Infinity Wars, Fury is one of countless individuals who are caught in Gamora's plan to appease the entity Devondra. He is fused with Rick Sheridan (the human host of Sleepwalker), forming Rick Fury. After journeying into the Soul Gem to retrieve Rick Sheridan, Sleepwalker encounters Rick Fury and uses his warp gaze to restore Nick Fury and Rick to their original selves.

== Powers and abilities ==
Nick Fury Jr. initially appears to have no superhuman qualities but he inherited his father's Infinity Formula at birth, slowing his aging process, speeding his healing time, and granting him peak human physical fitness.

Fury was trained in espionage under Maria Hill.

== Reception ==
The reaction by comic book fans to the revelation of Marcus Johnson being Nick Fury's son and replacing his father has been mixed. Tom Brevoort, Marvel's Vice President of publishing, believed this was a prudent move by Marvel because the African American incarnation appears in films, animated shows, and other licensed adaptations.

== See also ==
- Mikel Fury
