= List of Morning Glories characters =

Morning Glories is a comic book series published by Image Comics. Described by writer Nick Spencer as "Runaways meets Lost," the series focuses on six "brilliant but troubled" new recruits at Morning Glory Academy, a prestigious prep school hiding "sinister and deadly" secrets. Featuring interior art by Joe Eisma and cover art by Rodin Esquejo, the series was split into two twenty-five issue seasons and debuted in August 2010, concluding in March 2016. The series is currently on hiatus but Eisma has revealed that a third season is planned.

Aside from the six titular characters, Morning Glories features a large ensemble cast of students, faculty, parents and others, with Eisma estimating that he had drawn 99 uniquely identifiable faces (excluding background characters) by the conclusion of the first season.

== Morning Glories ==
The six titular students who are accepted to Morning Glory Academy in issue #1. The Glories act as the audience's introduction to the series.

=== Casey Blevins ===
A smart, beautiful, blonde student from Chicago, Illinois. Casey is the only one of the six protagonists who does not come from a broken home in some manner. Her parents loved her and gave her affection, especially her father, a former soldier, who taught the tomboyish Casey various survival skills including boxing and how to construct tear gas. When she enters Morning Glory Academy, her parents refuse to cut off contact with her and are murdered by the administration. After this Casey determines to resist and "burn this place to the ground." She appears to be the most academically gifted of the students and shows a real flair for leadership, easily organizing her fellow inductees around her. She has so far been protected from official reprisal by orders of Morning Glory's mysterious Headmaster.

"There's a very maternal aspect to Casey's character, a kind of 'beyond her years' thing in terms of responsibility that makes her want to hold this group together and make sure they're safe. At the same time, I think she's like a lot of those kids you see getting straight A's and doing all the right things, in that she may be pushing herself a bit too hard and taking on too much."

=== Zoe ===
Zoe is an Indian-American student who embodies the stereotype of the popular and mean cheerleader. In her previous school, Zoe had numerous boyfriends all of whom believe that she loved them. Initially her concerns in Morning Glory Academy seem to be a continuation of her previous obsessions with cute boys and popularity. She expresses annoyance with the other students, particularly with the earnestness of Casey and the moodiness of Jade. With the boys, she is disdainful of Ike's crude pickup lines and disdainful of Hunter's lack of status. As the series progresses a darker, and more murderous side to Zoe is seen and it is hinted that she may have a deeper connection to the events at Morning Glory Academy.

"She's not a bad person person, but she's someone who's gotten used to living in the rarified air that is being beautiful and smart. She's very driven and tends to view the people around her within the context of how much they can help her reach her goals - especially guys."

=== Hunter ===
Hunter is the comic book loving, pop-culture savvy son of a single father. Seen by others as largely a non-entity, Hunter is not especially good looking or smart, and has a quirk where he is unable to read clocks or hear their alarms. Hunter can never seem to be on time when something important is happening. Early on he develops an attraction to Casey, but through various quirks of fate is unable to actually go on a date with her.

"Hunter is like a lot of people who grew up in a broken home - he took to pop culture and his own imagination as a way of coping with the world around him. He's eternally well-intentioned and optimistic in ways that often come back around to bite him in the ass."

=== Ike ===
Ike is a rich and entitled student from a privileged Manhattan background. As a teenager he was accused, but eventually acquitted of, murdering his father. A deceptive and manipulative delinquent, Ike claims to care only for himself and brags about his experience in challenging authority. He quickly falls out with the other students after he betrays them to the administration in order to gain more privileges.

"He comes from a very privileged but strange upbringing and he's got a bad reputation. He's the ultimate opportunist and happily inhabits a very sinful, very troublesome life. He's a schemer."

=== Jun Fukayama ===
A very serious student from Japan. In some ways the most straightforwardly heroic student, Jun befriends Hunter and quickly joins in Casey's plans against the school. It is eventually revealed that Jun has an identical twin brother Hisao, who has been a student at Morning Glory Academy for years and that Jun has infiltrated the school with the intent of rescuing his brother. It is later revealed that he is actually Hisao, and that Jun had taken his place before he was supposed to be taken to the academy. Jun had been sent to infiltrate Morning Glory Academy by a group opposed to the Academy's mission. Jun is one of several students sent to infiltrate the Academy, including his boyhood crush Guillaume.

"He's a very serious, very direct person who isn't playing around. And yes, when he needs to, he can definitely kick your ass, so it's probably best not to put him in that position. There's a lot Jun isn't telling us. [...] He seems to know more about The Academy than they do."

=== Jade Ellsworth ===
A young emo student from the Midwest. Raised by a single father, Jade was moody and emotional even before arriving at Morning Glory Academy. This was exacerbated when, shortly after arriving, her father claimed to not know who she was. Depressed, Jade attempts suicide and is put in the custody of the school nurse who performs a mysterious experiment on her. During this experiment, and during a subsequent suicide attempt, Jade has an out of body experience where she travels both to the past as well as to her own future, meeting an adult version of herself who is apparently involved with Morning Glory Academy in some way.

"She's from a very traditional small town where everyone seems to think and act differently from her. [...] She's been through a lot in her life so far, a lot of personal tragedy, and it's certainly done a great deal to shape the way she looks at the people around her."

== Faculty ==
Though the dark forces at work behind the academy are still largely mysterious, a few villains have emerged:

=== Miss Daramount ===
Georgina Daramount is the main teacher who the students interact with. While on the surface she is a traditional strict schoolteacher she is actually a murderous and manipulative villain.

=== Mister Gribbs ===
Reginald Gribbs is the other primary teacher in the early issues of the book. He often acts as the muscle for Miss Daramount. He will sometimes engage in violence personally and often advocates a more direct and confrontational approach than Daramount does.

=== Miss Dagney ===
Susan Dagney is the elderly teacher who also acts as the school librarian. Dagney is arguably the Academy's first teacher, having raised Daramount and Hodge in place of their mothers.

=== Nine ===
The school nurse. Nine's job seems to consist mostly of conducting experiments on the living students and autopsies on dead ones. She is shown to be sadistic and greatly enjoys torturing the students she is supposed to be healing, something that puts her at odds with Hodge and Dagney. Nine is also tasked with looking for "special" children using methods that often result in long-term physical or mental damage. Nine has been working at the Academy since she was a young child as she is shown delivering a lethal injection to Hodge's mother shortly after she gives birth.

After her ordeal in detention shortly after arriving at the Academy, Jade is taken to Nine's office. She escapes with the help of one of Nine's test subjects, Megan, but is eventually subdued by guards, allowing Nine to inject her. After completing her tests, Nine concludes that Jade is of no interest to the Headmaster and voices her desire to "crack her head open and see what comes pouring out". Her plan is thwarted when a guard brings an unconscious Hunter into her office, distracting her long enough for Hisao to remove his disguise, knock her out and escape with Jade.

Later, Nine excitedly shows Hodge the corpses of four students (Amanda, Chad, Steve and Brendan) and specifically delights in the work of Brendan's killer David, whom she refers to as the schools "mascot".

Flashbacks reveal that when Abraham's camp was destroyed, the children there were sent to Nine to receive her "curriculum". When the Truants first arrived at the Academy, it was Fortunato who ended up in Nine's office and that she and Daramount interrupted their attempt to rescue him. Nine then conducted her tests on him. They also show that Nine injected Akiko following her attempt to kill Daramount by blowing up her chalkboard.

In issue #38, Gribbs orders Nine to inject Ike. Although willing to do it, she warns Gribbs that, should anything go wrong or the Headmaster take issue, she is not going to accept any responsibility for what happens.

=== Miss Hodge ===
The sister of Miss Daramount, Lara Hodge is the school guidance counselor and appears more supportive of, and loved by, the students. She claims to be a metaphorical prisoner of the school just as the students are literal prisoners and offers help to Casey in escaping. However, her proclaimed allegiance to the students may be a falsehood.

=== Mr N. ===
Mr N is a rarely-seen member of the faculty, due to his role as a teacher to students who need a more hands-on approach. He is briefly mentioned by Hunter and Fortunato in issue #28.

After her failed revolution against the Academy, Irina is sent to Mr N by Daramount so that he can deliver her a "specialised curriculum" in order to change her behaviour and allow the Academy to reassert its control over her. When they first meet, Irina stabs Mr N in the hand with a fork and the two begin to fight, with N emerging the victor. He encourages Irina to talk about her past and gets her to reveal that she is Daramount's half-sister.

In issue #46, Mr N offers to take Irina on a field trip where he can make use of her skills. Irina quickly determines that he wants her to assassinate someone which he confirms, saying that there are certain things members of the faculty are unable to do for fear of repercussions. N teleports them to Marrakech and reveals that his target is Zoe.

=== The Headmaster ===
Father to both Miss Hodge and Miss Daramount, the headmaster is the mysterious head of the school.

== The Truants ==
A group of students loyal to Abraham, the Truants play a significant role in the latter half of the first season.

== AV Club ==
The A.V. Club are officially introduced in issue #31 when they recruit Hunter after he is able to read their poster which looks blank to the other students. They intend to expose the Academy by starting a secret newspaper. Ian and Akiko are also members of the A.V. Club but the others distance themselves from the rest of the Truants, preferring to use non-violent methods to achieve their goals.

=== Maggie ===
Maggie and Hunter meet during the Woodrun in Volume 3. Maggie is sent by her teammates to "capture" Hisao, forcing him to return to the Academy and leaving Hunter and Zoe with one less team member. She and Hunter seem to get on well together and they flirt before Maggie is called back to her team, who mock her for being attracted to Hunter. That night, Maggie is collecting firewood and is brutally stabbed to death by Zoe as revenge on Hunter who insulted her earlier in the day. Hunter is awoken by the noise and finds Maggie's body, which is collected by the faculty and taken to the morgue.

A memorial service is held for Maggie and the other dead students in issue #31. When Hunter meets with the A.V. Club for the first time, he asks them how they knew to recruit him and Hannah reveals that, before she was killed, Maggie vouched for him and suggested he would be a strong addition to the group.

=== Andres ===
Andres first meets Hunter in the library and helps him find a book that he saw in his dream. He is later revealed to be a member of the AV Club and enjoys wearing clothing that references popular culture such as Star Wars when he is with the club. He attends Casey's election party and is beaten up by the guards after they disrupt it. Andres misses the debate between Casey and Isabel because he is working as the announcer for the Towerball final.

=== Esi ===
Esi was a friend of Maggie's who befriends Hunter based on her recommendation. She interrupts Hunter while he is in the woods expressing his regrets about not doing more to help Zoe. Initially startled, Esi tells Hunter not to worry, as reporting him for being outside after hours would also incriminate her. She asks him to follow her and introduces him to the rest of the AV Club.

=== Hannah ===
Hannah is a member of the AV Club who also works in the Academy library. She has a sarcastic personality and has a particular hatred of Irina. Hannah has multiple sclerosis and uses crutches to get around, something that prevents her from being able to scout out the arrival of Dr Simon and Dr Richmond with the others.

== Students ==
Aside from the Glories and the Truants, many other Morning Glory Academy students appear in the series.

=== Pamela ===
The roommate of Casey, Jade and Zoe, Pamela is the Resident Advisor of their floor. She is extremely excitable, unhinged and prone to violent mood swings, declaring the trio will be her "bestest friends" but later attempting to murder Jade by stabbing her bed. She is also the one who wakes up Casey and takes her down to the basement and gleefully tells her she will not have to worry about her parents anymore by showing her their dead bodies. Pamela and her team collect all of the flags and win the Woodrun, although it is revealed that she had to cut the ear off one of the members of her team in because he would not listen to her. She was also previously the roommate of Irina, Vanessa and Akiko, with Irina wishing Casey good luck after discovering she was roommates with Pamela. At Ike and Casey's election party, Casey finds Pamela hidden under a table where she informs Casey that she is secretly going to vote for her because she despises Isabel. She is also shown to be in charge of delivering the general announcements to the Academy.

=== Brendan ===
A student at the Academy, Brendan meets and becomes romantically involved with Vanessa shortly after she and the other Truants arrive at the Academy. When the Truants discover that Abraham has been captured by the faculty, they attempt to formulate a plan to rescue him and Vanessa recruits Brendan to help, much to the displeasure of the others who are wary of bringing in an outsider. Their plan fails and Brendan is killed by David. Upon her return to the Academy, Hodge inspects Brendan's body in Nine's office. Nine is particularly delighted with the corpse, applauding David's "work". When Vanessa is freed from solitary confinement, Hodge tells her that the nature of his death is "difficult to untangle". In return for a favour in the future, Hodge takes Vanessa to the shrine and allows her to go back in time to their last night together so that she can say goodbye to Brendan. Although confused by her sudden change of clothes and her emotional speech, Brendan admits that he loves Vanessa and the two share a kiss but Hodge erases his memory moments later so Vanessa's actions do not affect the timeline. When Dr Richmond arrives at the Academy, Hodge tells her about Brendan and explains that Vanessa is in a fragile state over his death.

=== Amanda ===
A student and head cheerleader at the Academy, Amanda invites Zoe to try out for the squad after finding out that she was a cheerleader at her old high school. Initially hesitant, Zoe eventually agrees to audition and meets Amanda and the other cheerleaders on the football field after house. Amanda explains to Zoe that the initiation will be composed of three questions, giving her a device that will tell if she is lying. Amanda asks her about her earliest memory (seeing her father kill her mother) and the worst thing she's ever done (killing a teacher and disposing of his body). When she asks the final question, "who is David?", Zoe refuses to answer and flees. Amanda reports her findings to Miss Daramount, who is pleased and tells her that, in return, the next curfew violation made by the cheerleaders will be overlooked. As soon as she leaves the office, Amanda is ambushed by Zoe and stabbed to death. Her body is taken to Nine's office where it is inspected by Hodge upon her return to the Academy.

=== Chad ===
Australian student Chad is introduced to Zoe by Amanda during her pitch to get Zoe to join the cheer squad. Hunter accidentally bumps into Chad and apologises. Chad is friendly, telling him not to worry and welcomes Hunter to the school. Later, when Hunter is on the way to his date with Casey, Chad and Steve threaten him. With the aid of Jun, they tie up Hunter, put a bag over his head and take him to the greenhouse. Hunter hears them mention seeing a new girl (presumably Zoe) followed by silence. When he is rescued by Hisao, Hunter sees that Chad and Steve were hanging from the ceiling with their guts sliced open and the phrase "all will be free" written in their blood. Chad's body is taken to Nine's office and it is inspected by Hodge upon her return to the Academy.

=== Steve ===
Steve is introduced to Zoe by Amanda when she is trying to convince her to join the cheer squad. He and Chad tie Hunter up on the way to his date with Casey and take him to the greenhouse with a bag over his head. Hunter hears them talk about seeing a "new girl" followed by silence. Both he and Chad are killed by Zoe. His body is taken to Nine's office and inspected by Hodge upon her return to the Academy.

=== Isabel Traveiso ===
A classmate who was Casey's academic rival at her old high school. Casey has a deep dislike of Isabel, with the two constantly competing to be first in their class. Isabel also asserts that Casey cheated in a previous science fair, causing her entry to win over Isabel's (this is later revealed that Casey actually did inadvertently cheat in order to beat Isabel at the science fair when Clarkson is asked to be the tie-breaker judge and naturally chooses Casey's project as the winner). They are both freshmen who were permitted to take Clarkson's AP physics class. Much to Casey's chagrin, her parents invite Isabel to her going away party when she is accepted to Morning Glory Academy. She gives Casey a blank farewell card and the two girls eventually admit their mutual hatred of one another.

In issue #39, Isabel is revealed to have been a student at the Academy from a very young age who was planted in Casey's high school in order to give her someone to compete against. Much to Casey's surprise, Isabel is an overwhelmingly popular student, having been elected Class President even during the two years she was attending Casey's school. Hodge reveals that Isabel is one of the only students who has met the Headmaster. She is giving her re-election speech to the student body and is shocked when Casey interrupts and announces that she is running against her. Isabel is confident she will win unless Casey cheats somehow but welcomes the challenge. She crashes Ike's party but he calls the guards instantly, making the other students think she was responsible in an effort to cause her to lose voters. During the debate, Isabel gives academy-friendly responses to each of Dagney's questions and uses Casey's answers against her. When Casey reveals that the Academy killed her parents, Isabel also announces that they killed her parents too but that she chooses to honor their memory by following the rules and being the best student she can be. Thanks to Ike and Ian manipulating reality, Casey defeats Isabel and is elected Class President.

== Others ==
=== Sarah Price ===
Sarah was a high school friend of Zoe's who was on the cheer squad with her. While practising, they are interrupted by one of their teachers who chastises Sarah for being late handing in an assignment but promises he will not fail her if she can get it to him before the end of the day. When Zoe is passing his classroom, she hears screams and rushes in to find the teacher attempting to rape Sarah. Trying to protect her, Zoe hits the teacher over the head but his head strikes the desk as he falls, killing him. Sarah exclaims that they were in love and were "playing". Zoe forces Sarah to help her dispose of the body. Sarah shows immense guilt over the death of her lover and admits to Zoe that she is considering going to the police and confessing. Zoe tells her she cannot because their lives will be ruined forever but Sarah seems certain that it is the right thing to do. A few days later, Sarah is found dead and it is strongly suggested that she was killed by Zoe.

=== Julia Hayes ===
Julia Hayes is a physicist. A Yale graduate, Julia works alongside her father and is instrumental in building the Cylinder. When it is activated for the first time, it kills everyone in the room aside from her father, although he later dies from his injuries in hospital. Responsible for twelve counts of negligent homicide, Julia flees to London and assumes a new identity. She is tracked down the future Jade (who is now in possession of the Cynlinder) and invites her to have a meeting but Julia wishes to be left alone until Jade tells her there are others pursuing her. Julia agrees to go to Jade's office and is invited to join her team. During a visit to the library with older Jade in issue #28, Hunter sees a photograph of Julie in a school yearbook and later searches for information on her with Andres.

=== Dr. Ellen Richmond ===
Dr. Richmond is Vanessa's mother and a teacher at Abraham's school. She worked alongside Dr. Simon in the lab that eventually resulted in the creation of his "son" Ian. Ellen is worried for her daughter's safety when Vanessa and the other truants leave for their mission to take down the Academy and gives Vanessa a special phone that was gives to her by Ms. Clarkson and will allow them to communicate. When Abraham's camp is attacked, she helps several of the students, including Hisao, escape. Once she and Dr. Simon are brought to Morning Glory Academy, she watches Vanessa through screens.
