= Last Remains =

2020 Spider-Man comic storyline

- Publisher: Marvel Comics
- Publication date: October 2020 – January 2021
- Genre: Superhero
Title(s)
The Amazing Spider-Man Vol 5 #50–58
- Main character(s): Spider-Man; Sin-Eater; Norman Osborn; Miles Morales; Spider-Gwen; Cindy Moon; Harry Osborn; Doctor Strange; Mary Jane Watson

Creative team
- Writer: Nick Spencer
- Artist(s): Mark Bagley; Marcelo Ferreira; Patrick Gleason; Federico Vicentini; Takeshi Miyazawa
- Editor(s): Nick Lowe; Tom Groneman; Lindsey Cohick

"Last Remains" is a 2020 storyline published by Marvel Comics, starring the character Spider-Man. The events in this story seem to be a consequence of the events that occurred in 2007's One More Day storyline. This storyline features Spider-Man fighting against a new enemy, called Kindred who has taken control of Miles Morales, Spider-Gwen, Spider-Woman, Anya Corazon, and Julia Carpenter. The entire storyline lasts from The Amazing Spider-Man (vol. 5) #50–55, with several tie-ins, and #56–57 being the epilogues. The main story received mixed to positive reviews, with critics praising the art style, and the character analysis of Spider-Man, but there was heavy criticism on the pacing, the unresolved plot threads, and the identity of Kindred.

== Plot summary ==
=== Main story ===
During the events of "Sins Rising", Spider-Man throws Norman Osborn off a ship and leaves him in the wreckage. Sin-Eater shoots Osborn with his rifle, knocking him out. Kindred uses a centipede to communicate with Sin-Eater and calls him a hypocrite, stating that Sin-Eater hates people who have sins in them, yet he is full of sins. Kindred kills Sin-Eater, absorbing his magic. He possesses Miles Morales, Spider-Gwen, Spider-Woman, Anya Corazon, and Julia Carpenter and forces them to attack Spider-Man. Anya injects Spider-Man with venom before she and the other possessed heroes escape.

Spider-Man manages to make it to the Sanctum Sanctorum before collapsing. Upon recovering, a downcast Peter tells Doctor Strange about something that had occurred, with the doctor being upset that Peter made a deal with a demon and did not expect any consequences. Aiming to help rectify the evil, as Strange inquires about the Order, a demon-possessed Silk attacks the two. Meanwhile, Norman recovers at Ravencroft, newly cleansed of his evil. He begs Ashley Kafka to find Kindred, who aims to enact a worse event upon the city. When Kafka asks to know his reasoning for saving such a person, Norman answers that Kindred is his son Harry Osborn.

Spider-Man uses the Hand of Vashanti, a magical weapon given to him by Doctor Strange, to enter the astral plane. However, he finds the plane in ruins and sees a vision of Mary Jane being eaten by centipedes. Spider-Man wakes up in the middle of a grave and digs himself out before encountering Kindred. Meanwhile, Sin-Eater begs Kindred's forgiveness and says he will not renounce his master's name. Sin-Eater reveals that he is planning to kill Morlun to steal his powers.

Spider-Man fights against Kindred, who brutalizes him with his tendrils before sending him in front of the Brooklyn Bridge, where he sees the possessed spider-heroes causing havoc. Spider-Man sees Spider-Gwen about to throw Miles Morales off the bridge, and starts begging to Kindred. Spider-Man says his friends did not do anything, and that if Kindred lets them go he can have him. Kindred agrees, freeing the spider heroes but snapping Spider-Man's neck. Spider-Man has a dream about the day Harry Osborn returned from Europe and encounters Kindred, who reveals his identity as Harry to him.

Morlun kills the mutated Sin-Eater followers and confronts Sin-Eater. Morlun initially has the upper hand, but is overwhelmed and killed by Sin-Eater. Meanwhile, the spider-heroes and Strange navigate through the astral plane and arrive at Kindred's graveyard.

Kindred repeatedly kills and resurrects Spider-Man. He reveals that he plans to show Peter that Hell is the absence of light and hope, and is worse than death itself. Kindred explains that he revived the Sin-Eater to reform his father, but Peter stopped him because of his self-righteousness. Peter sees Sin-Eater shooting Morlun, and also sees Sin-Eater waiting for the spider-heroes. Julia Carpenter willingly allows Sin-Eater to absorb her precognition, which allows him to see Kindred's identity and intentions. Sin-Eater shoots himself and disappears in a flash of light. Just then, Kindred kidnaps the spider-heroes. It is later revealed that Norman did not have his sins cleansed and is still evil; and he is working with the Kingpin to kill Kindred.

Kindred ties up Peter and calls out his selfishness and fear, stating that all his friends and family died because of his actions. Peter attempts to apologize, but Harry is angered and beats him up. Mary Jane tells him to stop, but Harry explains that he needs to kill Peter because Peter will bring death and suffering to everyone else. Mary Jane offers herself up, but just before Harry is about to make a move, the Green Goblin appears, shocking Kindred. He throws a bomb, mortally wounding Mary Jane, and attacks Kindred.

=== Epilogue ===
It is revealed that Green Goblin threw only a flash grenade, which did not injure Mary Jane. Mary Jane takes the rest of the spider-heroes to safety while Spider-Man, Green Goblin and Kindred confront each other. During the chaos, the sins that Kindred took are freed and returned to their original hosts, resurrecting Morlun and the Juggernaut. Kindred tells the two of them that he wanted Spider-Man to remember what he did, while he also wanted Green Goblin to leave Norman Osborn, but realized that failed and both Peter and Norman do not remember what happened, before Kindred is encased in a black cube. Later that night, Norman reflects on the recent developments, revealing that he'd faked returning to being Green Goblin and that his cleansing and remorse really are genuine. Norman expresses confusion on why he's still good, but nevertheless embraces his newfound empathy and vows to make amends for his years of evil deeds and promises to find out what Kindred is talking about. Spider-Man confronts Norman, who explains that his epiphany is genuine, but Peter refuses to forgive him. Norman admits to all wrongdoings, wanting to start making up for it by asking Spider-Man and him to work together to help Harry.

== Critical reception ==
According to Comic Book Roundup, Amazing Spider Man Vol 5 Issue 50 received a score of 7.1 out of 10 based on 13 reviews. Quin Tassin from Multiversity Comics wrote ""The Amazing Spider-Man #50" is a competently written but ultimately disappointing landmark issue in Nick Spencer's take on our favorite web-slinger."

According to Comic Book Roundup, Issue 50.LR Tie-In received a score of 7.6 out of 10 based on 8 reviews. David Weber from Monkeys fighting Robots wrote "An issue full of gorgeous art, that falls short on having a continuously engaging story."

According to Comic Book Roundup, Issue 51 received a score of 7.9 out of 10 based on 11 reviews. David Brooke from AIPT wrote "While it can be frustrating to try to piece together what is going on, it's hard to deny the general mood and atmosphere of this story suit the spooky season and feels entirely different. For that, The Amazing Spider-Man #51 is an interesting foray into a dark place that is unusual and intriguing."

According to Comic Book Roundup, Issue 51. LR Tie-In received a score of 7.2 out of 10 based on 8 reviews. Harlan Ivester from Comics: The Gathering wrote "As usual, this .LR issue is really required reading for Spencer's Spider-Man story. Thankfully, it's worth the price of admission. There are some questionable or concerning elements, but the ride is enjoyable especially thanks to fantastic art from Vicentini and Menyz. Give this a read."

According to Comic Book Roundup, Issue 52 received a score of 8.4 out of 10 based on 8 reviews. Chris Aiken from Black Nerd Problems wrote "Patrick Gleason's art matches the tone of the issue. Every panel is rough, and I especially love how Peter's suit deteriorates from the beginning to the end of the battle. The possessed Spider-Family members have some pretty unique designs as well. We leave off on a hell of a cliffhanger, but I'm pretty sure it's not the end. Hopefully, we explore a bit more about Harry's turn to Kindred and his goal for Peter."

According to Comic Book Roundup, Issue 52. LR Tie-In received a score of 7.5 out of 10 based on 8 reviews. Megan Peters from Comicbook.com wrote "The Amazing Spider-Man's "Last Remains" puts forth one of its most raw chapters yet this week"

According to Comic Book Roundup, Issue 53 received a score of 6.9 out of 10 based on 9 reviews. Kevin Lainez from Comic Book Revolution wrote "Amazing Spider-Man #53 is all about the big reveal of Peter Parker finding out who Kindred really is. From that perspective Nick Spencer did a great job building up that reveal by using controversial events in Spider-Man's history to create a strong foundation for why this revelation had such an impact on Peter Parker. Unfortunately not much else happens in Amazing Spider-Man #53 as Spencer has left all the other sub-plots of "The Last Remains" to be told in the tie-in issues."

According to Comic Book Roundup, Issue 53. LR received a score of 6.3 out of 10 based on 6 reviews. Harven Ivester from Comics: The Gathering wrote "The art is pretty solid, but I do feel there is a step off. I loved the front half by Vicentini. His work is very sharp and clean, and there is so much depth and dynamics to be found in his action pieces. He does a great job at selling just how brutally fast Morlun is. Miyazawa's half, following the Order of the Web in Peter's psyche, is presented in a much more traditional layout. The cliffhanger is a standout page, making excellent use of a perceived field of depth. I think the Spider-Folk can look just a little wonky in some instances, but I can't complain about too much here."

According to Comic Book Roundup, Issue 54 received a score of 7.3 out of 10 based on 8 reviews. CJ from But Why Tho? wrote "Though it hits a few of the same notes as previous issues, Amazing Spider-Man #54 still manages to put our hero through the wringer. The stage is set for an epic confrontation that may cost Peter Parker everything and could set Kindred up as the foe who truly beat him."

According to Comic Book Roundup, Issue 54. LR Tie-In received a score of 7.5 out of 10 based on 8 reviews. Megan Peters from ComicBook.com wrote "The update checks on Mary Jane's unchecked feelings about Norman Osborne, and fans are met with a shocking fate for one of Peter's comrades."

According to Comic Book Roundup, Issue 55 received a score of 7.5 out of 10 based on 13 reviews. Deron Generally from Super Powered Fancast wrote "Patrick Gleason delivers some beautiful imagery throughout this issue. Not only do the characters look great, but the small details throughout the panels are evocative and visually engaging."

According to Comic Book Roundup, Issue 56 received a score of 6.6 out of 10 based on 10 reviews. wolfcypher from Weird Science Marvel Comics wrote "The writing and the pacing of this story is now wearing on my patience, as Nick Spencer has shockingly gone back to his frustrating habit of drawing things out much longer than they should be. It's a shame that what was a really engaging story is now being halted with an issue more interested in teasing upcoming stories and bringing in more ancillary characters with nothing to do with what we've been following in Last Remains. If you add up both the main issues and the point issues of Last Remains, this is effectively Last Remains Chapter 12, and its still…going…on…with no new answers or revelations."

According to Comic Book Roundup, Issue 57 received a score of 7.4 out of 10 based on 8 reviews. CJ from But Why Tho? wrote "Amazing Spider-Man #57 feels a little overpacked with plot points, though it contains a highly emotional confrontation between Spidey and Norman Osborn. Next issue has promised to start the next era of Spencer's run on the series, and I hope it keeps its focus on a singular plot/character."

== Collected editions ==
Title	Material collected	Published date	ISBN
Amazing Spider-Man by Nick Spencer Vol. 11: Last Remains	Amazing Spider-Man (vol. 5) #50–55	March 2021	978-1302925871
Amazing Spider-Man: Last Remains Companion	Amazing Spider-Man (vol. 5) #50.LR–54.LR	March 2021	978-1302927790
Amazing Spider-Man by Nick Spencer Omnibus Vol. 2	The Amazing Spider-Man (vol. 5) #44–73, #74 (A–B Stories), #50.LR–54.LR, The Amazing Spider-Man: Sins Rising Prelude, The Amazing Spider-Man: The Sins of Norman Osborn, Giant-Size Amazing Spider-Man: King's Ransom, Giant-Size Amazing Spider-Man: Chameleon Conspiracy, Sinister War #1–4	June 2024	978-1302953645
