= Battle Scars (disambiguation) =

Battle Scars may refer to:

- Battle Scars
- Battle Scars (comic book)
- "Battle Scars" (CSI: NY)
- "Battle Scars" (Mercy Point)
- "Battle Scars" (Star Wars: The Bad Batch)
- Battle Scars (film)
