= Fury (2023 one-shot) =

2023 comic book one-shot by Marvel Comics

Publication information
- Publisher: Marvel Comics
- Format: One-shot
- Publication date: May 24 2023
- Main character(s): Nick Fury; Nick Fury Jr. S.H.I.E.L.D. Red Hargrove; Ronald Wolverstone-Clodd; Happy Sam Sawyer; Izzy Cohen; Uatu

Creative team
- Written by: Al Ewing
- Penciller(s): Scot Eaton; Tom Reilly; Adam Kubert; Ramón Rosanas
- Inker(s): Cam Smith; Tom Reilly; Adam Kubert; Ramón Rosanas
- Letterer(s): Joe Caramagna
- Colorist(s): Jordie Bellaire
- Editor(s): Martin Biro; Annalise Bissa; Tom Brevoort

Fury is a 2023 double sized Marvel Comics one-shot celebrating the 60th anniversary of the character Nick Fury.

== Publication history ==
The comic was first announced in February 2023 to be written by Al Ewing (who had previously also written the Ant-Man 60th anniversary comic), along with art by Tom Reilly, Adam Kubert, Scott Eaton, and Ramón Rosanas. Each artist illustrates a different era of Nick Fury's life.

== Plot ==
The premise of the comic revolves around Nick Fury and his son Nick Fury Jr., there are several stories set during different periods of Fury's history as a character. The comic concludes with Fury Sr. ending his work as the Unseen and deciding to travel the multiverse.

== Reception ==
The series holds an average rating of 7.9 by 10 professional critics on the review aggregation website Comic Book Roundup.
