= Morning Glories =

Comic book series

- Teaser Campaign Promo Art by Rodin Esquejo

Group publication information
- Publisher: Image Comics
- First appearance: Morning Glories #1 (August 2010)
- Created by: Nick Spencer; Joe Eisma

Morning Glories

Series publication information
- Schedule: Monthly
- Format: Ongoing series
- Genre: Mystery, Drama, Adventure
- Publication date: August 2010 – July 2016 (on hiatus)
- Number of issues: 50
- Main character(s): Casey; Zoe; Hunter; Ike; Jun; Jade

Creative team
- Writer(s): Nick Spencer
- Artist(s): Joe Eisma; Alex Sollazzo; Johnny Lowe
- Creator(s): Nick Spencer; Joe Eisma

Morning Glories is a comic book series published by Image Comics. Described by writer Nick Spencer as "Runaways meets Lost," the series focuses on six "brilliant but troubled" new recruits at Morning Glory Academy, a prestigious prep school hiding "sinister and deadly" secrets. Featuring interior art by Joe Eisma and cover art by Rodin Esquejo, the series debuted in August 2010.

== Publication history ==
Though sharing qualities with other long form, high-concept mysteries, writer Spencer points out that Morning Glories was launched with a planned run of about 100 issues and a definite ending, culminating in a final series run of fifty issues. The first pages of the debut, Spencer says, will "completely prove that we knew what we were doing from the get go." The series found commercial success from its inception, with four printings of the first issue alone. The first volume of the trade paperback edition (containing issues 1–6) sold 10,000 copies in a month. Critical success is abundant as well, with IGN calling the first issue "one of the most engrossing...in recent memory" and noting that Spencer is "determined to make the rest of the comic book world stand up and take notice."

The first 50 issues are split into two "seasons", with the first encompassing volumes 1–4 (For a Better Future to Truants) and the second, volumes 5–10 (Tests to Expulsion). The third season, titled Summer Vacation, was expected to be released in Winter 2016 or early 2017. Although it is a continuation of the story, it is planned for Summer Vacation to launch as a new issue #1.

Responding to a question on his Tumblr page in December 2017, Eisma stated that he is in semi-regular contact with Spencer but has been given no indication of a start date for work on the third season before adding that he is anxious to continue working on the series as soon as he receives the first script.

== Premise ==
The series takes place almost completely at the fictional Morning Glory Academy, an exclusive boarding school for teenagers. Beneath its placid facade, the school is actually involved in the murder and torture of students as well as various investigations into occult and supernatural phenomena. The main action focuses on six students from diverse backgrounds as they enter Morning Glory Academy, try to survive and fight back against the ruthless faculty.

The series is written using a nonlinear narrative, frequently utilising flashbacks or flash-forwards to confuse, misdirect and inform the reader. Prominent recurring themes include religion, philosophy, science, identity, power, death and authoritarianism. The series also includes science fiction elements, primarily time-travel.

== Characters ==
See: List of Morning Glories Characters for more information.

The story initially centres on six new Morning Glory Academy students: Casey, Zoe, Hunter, Jun, Jade, and Ike, focusing on their early lives with their families as well as their interactions with each other and the school's faculty: Miss Daramount, Mr Gribbs, Miss Dagney, Miss Hodge and Nurse Nine. The villainous Headmaster of the Academy is frequently mentioned but is not seen until issue #50.

As the series progresses, a new significant group of students referred to as the Truants are introduced. Made up of Irina, Guillaume, Vanessa, Ian, Fortunato and Akiko, they are a diverse group of children loyal to Abraham, a man with a connection to the Academy and each of the Glories. The Truants play a pivotal role in the latter half of season one and continue to be important characters during the second season.

In season two, the A.V. Club, a collection of students with the goal of exposing the truth about the Academy through non-violent means, are introduced after they befriend Hunter in issue #31. They are composed of Esi, Andres and Hannah.

== Story arcs ==
=== Season One ===
"For A Better Future" (#1–6)

Six students, Casey, Zoe, Jade, Jun, Hunter and Ike are granted entrance into the prestigious boarding school Morning Glory Academy. After arriving and orientation, Jade tries to contact her parents, but her father claims to not have a daughter. Distressed, she confides in Casey who investigates the matter. Casey then discovers the academy has killed her parents. The faculty apprehends Casey where they ask her the same question over and over: “Whose theorem established that reality must be non-local?” Casey refuses to answer and is thrown into detention where she finds the other five students also there for various reasons. The faculty floods the classroom. Jade attempts to kill herself. The water level nears the top of ceiling when Casey shouts out the answer to the question posed to her earlier. The water is drained and the faculty takes Jade to the infirmary.

When Jade is not seen or heard from for days, Casey comes to believe that the school is going to kill her and hatches a plan with the other four students to save her friend. Ike betrays Casey’s plan to the faculty, and Daramount, with some thugs, arrives to stop the students. Casey and Zoe flee the scene, while Hunter is knocked unconscious. Miss Daramount catches the two girls and leads them back to their dorm, where, much to Daramount’s surprise, Jade is waiting for them. Casey had factored in Ike’s betrayal. While Casey and Zoe were running from the faculty, Jun had infiltrated Daramount’s thugs, took the “unconscious” Hunter to the infirmary and the two of them sprung Jade free. Gribbs threatens Casey with bodily harm if she ever pulls something like this again

Issue #6 is set in what appears to be the future. A red-headed woman offers a scientist, on the run for murder, a place to continue her research on a mysterious device at Morning Glory Academy. This red-headed woman is revealed to be an older version of Jade.
"All Will Be Free" (#7–12)

This arc focuses on one particular character for each issue.

Zoe
A man named Abraham visits India on the hunt for a special child. He finds a young Zoe and she greets Abraham as an old friend and hints that she knew he was coming, implying some sort of psychic ability. It is also stated at this time that Zoe has never spoken or even heard English before, but when she meets Abraham, she speaks it fluently.

In present times, Zoe looks to join the cheerleading squad at MGA. A flashback to her earlier life reveals that Zoe used to be on a cheerleading squad at her old school with a close friend. During a practice, a teacher reprimands Zoe's friend for not completing her homework and instructs her to drop it off before 5. Later, Zoe is leaving practice when she finds the teacher apparently attempting to rape her friend. She rushes to her aid, hitting the teacher on the head in with a book, causing him to fall and strike his head on the edge of a desk, killing him. Her friend then confesses that they were really lovers and they were merely "playing." Zoe, outraged, yells at her to help burn the body. Back in the present, Zoe heads to the midnight initiation ceremony for the squad, where through a series of questions she has to answer truthfully, she confesses that she killed the teacher and destroyed the body. She also reveals that when she was very young, she saw her father kill her mother. However, she refuses to answer a third question, "Who is David?" and leaves the other cheerleaders. The head cheerleader reports back to Daramount this information. As the cheerleader leaves, a figure stalks her and stabs her. The killer is revealed to be Zoe.

Hunter
A young Hunter, running late in meeting his father, is saved from an oncoming truck by Abraham. He gives Hunter a watch so that he can keep track of time.

Back in present day, Hunter asks Casey out on a picnic date, and after some hesitation, she accepts. Excited, Hunter dances through the halls and bumps into an Australian student, Chad, knocking his books askew. Chad seems not to mind and tells Hunter to just pay attention next time. Hunter dresses for his date and asks Jun to please remind him when to leave. A flashback reveals that for important appointments, Hunter is always late because he cannot hear the alarms he sets and the clock always reads 8:13. Hunter heads for his date and is jumped by Chad who apparently is now angry about the earlier altercation. Hunter pleads with Jun who is passing by for help, but Jun screams at Hunter, "What did you just call me?!" and punches Hunter across the face knocking him unconscious. Jun, Chad and another boy tie Hunter up, pull a hood over his face, and drag him to the greenhouse. Hunter awakens to hear his assailants being stabbed. Meanwhile, Casey has arrived by the tree for her date with Hunter, but leaves after waiting for him until the sun sets. Jun finds, unties, and explains to Hunter that it was his brother who attacked him.

Jun
Five years previously, Gribbs and Daramount come to pick up both Jun and his twin brother Hisao for Morning Glory Academy. While the boys are getting ready, their mother mentions to Daramount that Hisao and Jun were born 30 minutes apart unlike what their birth certificates report. Daramount proclaims that they now can only take Hisao. Their mother argues that she will not let them split up the brothers. Jun runs downstairs to see that Daramount has ordered Gribbs to strangle their mother. She orders Gribbs to ignore Jun and grab Hisao. Jun runs upstairs and switches shirts with Hisao so that he can take his place. They take Jun unknowingly and light the house on fire. Abraham arrives and helps Hisao escape from the burning home.

Prior to the events of issue 3, Jun confronts Hisao. Jun has been brainwashed and no longer loves his brother and actually thinks he is Hisao. Hisao tries to convince his brother that he is here to save him, but this only angers Jun. Gribbs arrives, and breaks up the two brothers.

Jade
Jade dreams of a destroyed city, a laboratory, her mother's death and a French aristocrat. Casey wakes her for school, and when Hunter tries to explain to Casey why he was late for their date, but she says that with the current state of affairs, she doesn't think they should go out. Jade and Casey head to class, where the teacher lectures on how to make a hangman's noose and asks the class if anyone can demonstrate how to use one. Jade volunteers and hangs herself. Jade is transported to a room where the older Jade is waiting for her. They discuss Casey, Hunter, Ike and Jade's dreams. The older Jade instructs her not to tell anyone what she saw, except for the shooting stars overhead. Jade awakens in the infirmary and tells Nine that all she saw were silver streaks in the sky.

Ike
A year previously Ike sits over a dead man bleeding on the floor. Abraham tells Ike that he needs to leave and to follow the plan.

In the present, Gribbs approaches Ike with a proposition. Ike will be set free from the Academy if Ike kills someone for him. Ike ponders the offer, but decides to decline because he has no desire to be set free. However, Daramount convinces him to reconsider by seducing him. Gribbs leads Ike down to the basement to the man he must kill, revealed to be Abraham. Ike greets him, acknowledging him as his father.

Hodge

Hodge, Daramount's sister is introduced. All of the students greet Hodge as if one of their favorite teachers. Hodge learns of the killings at the school and confronts Daramount, who is revealed to be her sister. She learns the headmaster is upset with Daramount. Hodge then meets with the six new students. She gives Zoe a revolver telling her she'll need it, but that she wouldn't hold someone hostage, telling her that she is not a killer. She approaches Hisao who seems to know her but does not wish to talk. She gives Jade pills to help stop her nightmares. She tells Hunter that she can help with his condition, saying it is all in his file. Surprisingly, she reveals the file is all empty papers and asks him: "How do you suppose that works?" Finally, she finds Casey down where her parents were hung. Hodge tries to comfort her, but Casey hits her. Before she hits her again, Hodge offers her a way to bring her parents back.
"P.E." (#13–19)

Casey receives a letter from Miss Hodge and, with Jade, frantically tries to find Hunter. However, they are interrupted by the announcement of "Woodrun", a sort of scavenger hunt in the woods around the school. Students are sorted into teams of three with Ike joining Casey and Jade. Hunter is sorted into a group with Zoe, who is angry at him for his hurtful comments to her, and a distracted seeming Jun. As the students begin Woodrun, Casey leads her team to a hidden cave where they find Miss Hodge waiting. Miss Hodge explains that she is going to help Casey escape, but that the process may not go entirely right because Hunter was supposed to be there. While Ike and Jade watch, she and Casey go sit in a pair of seats below them and watch shadows cast on a wall. Eventually, they disappear. Casey discovers that she and Miss Hodge have been sent into her own past, to when she was a child and her father was the military commander of a mysterious base. Captured by the military, Miss Hodge breaks them out by hypnotizing the guards, something she also instructs Casey on how to do. While Hodge returns to Morning Glory Academy, Casey is left to wait until she can try to save her fellow students.

Meanwhile, the sky over Morning Glory Academy suddenly goes from day to night. The students and faculty seem separated into two different realities where the other group has disappeared from the school. Jun abandons Hunter and Zoe, who achieve one of the scavenger hunt items. Hunter then has an encounter with a geeky girl who seems romantically interested in him. However, that night, after an angry conversation with him, Zoe murders the girl. When Hunter sees the attack, Zoe tries to kill him too, but is shot by the leader of a mysterious group of students. A flashback shows Hisao being trained in military matters by Abraham at a desert camp. A number of other children at the camp are selected to be sent to Morning Glory Academy, including Guillaume, who says goodbye by kissing him. In the present, Hisao reunites with Guillaume at the school and the two have sex. They are interrupted by the arrival of Jun and Guillaume then informs Hisao about the others sent to infiltrate the school and says they must find and warn them.
"Truants" (#20–25)

A flashback shows the childhood of Miss Hodge and Miss Daramount. Their initially loving relationship as children turns sour when Hodge becomes their father's apparent favorite. One night, a student from Morning Glory Academy awakens the young Lara Hodge and takes her to the cave in the woods. The student, Vanessa, says that Miss Hodge has sent her from the future where Hodge is the student's ally against the Academy leadership. However, the young Miss Hodge murders Vanessa and offers her up as proof of loyalty to her father. As the first students arrive at Morning Glory Academy, Miss Hodge explains to her governess that while Miss Daramount, who has been selected to run the school, will be hated by the students, she will control them through love. In the present, Daramount emerges from a meeting with the Headmaster (where she told him she had lost the students) covered in vicious cuts. Hodge looks after her and she explains to her sister that she has weakened the rebellious students by tricking Casey into abandoning them.

Irina, the girl who shot Zoe and leader of the Truants, grazes Hunter to stop him fleeing. She introduces him to Vanessa and Ian, who are reunited with Hisao and Guillaume moments later. Irina initially berates Guillaume for leaving his post but he explains that Jun's presence will affect their plan. Hisao reveals his true identity to Hunter and asks him to trust the others. The Truants were initially sent to the Academy from Abraham's camp to infiltrate and acquire information but Irina, believing that taking down the man who built the Academy would help save the world, attempts to kill the Headmaster. Her attempt is unsuccessful and alerts the faculty that Abraham has betrayed them. In retaliation, Daramount burned his camp to the ground and captured him. Learning of his imprisonment, the Truants formulated a plan to rescue him. Irina explains that they must make it to a tower on the Academy grounds to enact their plan, with Guillaume mentioning that they caused the students and faculty to be separated by changing their position in time. Although confused and sceptical, Hunter follows them and the group eventually arrives at the tower. Inside, Jun is preparing a ritual but, Irina kills him, saying a sacrifice is needed. Enraged, Hisao shouts at Hunter to run as Irina prepares to shoot him. Vanessa diverts the shot allowing him to escape where he is rescued by the older Jade.

Hisao, who was knocked unconscious, it taken out of the tower by the Truants. When he wakes, he demands answers. Irina tells him a sacrifice was demanded for their plan to work but Guillaume reveals to the others that she was never planning to rescue Abraham and is instead planning to kill his son. Hisao abandons the group and returns to the ruins to comfort his dying brother. Inside, he runs into Fortunato, another Truant, carrying Akiko who had attempted to stop Irina's plan by offering herself as the sacrifice to David.

Ike and Jade leave the cave and are apprehended by Gribbs who interrogates them over the missing students. Gribbs then threatens Jade's life if Ike does not agree to kill his father. Flashbacks reveal Ike and Abraham's difficult relationship, with Abraham constantly absent due to work commitments. At one point, young Ike dreams about Abraham rescuing Hisao from the fire and burns down his bedroom in the hope it would make his father come home. As he grows up, the rift between the two becomes larger, with Ike's behaviour getting more and more out of control. One night, Ike comes home to find Abraham drunk and discovers a photograph of him with the Truants at his camp, as well as his will. Finding that Abraham is leaving him nothing, Ike stabs his father to death. In the present, Ike agrees to kill him if Jade's life is spared but, after stealing a gun, he kills Gribbs and turns the gun on Jade, threatening to kill her if Abraham does not explain how he is still alive. Abraham warns Ike that Irina is coming to kill him.

Older Jade takes Hunter to the ruins of a monastery that he builds in the future and tells him that they can rewind time, thwarting Irina's plan and stop anyone from dying. They are both unsure if their time travel has worked but Jade says that there is still one person that can save them: Casey.

=== Season Two ===
"Tests" (#26–29)

In the past, time-displaced Casey has a dinner with Abraham but rejects his advances before heading to her hotel and opening the bag Hodge gave her. Inside are instructions telling her what to do next. Casey dyes her hair black and dresses like Daramount, getting a job as "Ms. Clarkson", a physics teacher so that she can teach the younger version of herself and encourage her to apply to Morning Glory Academy in the first place. She eventually falls in love with Tom, a history teacher at the school. At the parent-teacher conference, Casey as Clarkson attempts to convince her mother to let Casey apply to the Academy. She refuses and Casey is forced to hypnotize her mother into allowing it. Hodge arrives moments later and makes a joke. Enraged about having to force her own mother to do something that ultimately gets both of her parents killed, as well as numerous other things she has had to do in the twelve years since she was sent back in time, Casey berates Hodge, who reassures her that her actions will save her parents and warns her it is almost time to return to the present. That night, Casey leaves a note to Tom and gets in her car but is involved in an accident and taken to hospital.

Hodge carries Daramount to the entrance of the cave to wait for Casey to emerge. When she does, she hits Hodge in the face and, although Daramount is sceptical that Casey can help them, Hodge tells her she already has helped them, revealing that all of the missing students have returned. Hodge takes Casey to the basement where a large Cylinder is being held. Casey says she has dreamed of the Cylinder every night since she was sent back in time and knows what to do to put things right.

At a standoff, Abraham attempts to reason with Irina and Jade (who has grabbed Ike's gun after he was knocked unconscious). Irina berates Abraham for being weak but he remains confident that the other Truants will not let her murder Ike. Jade calls the guards, saying Irina killed Gribbs but Irina compels them to follow her and orders for Jade, Ike and Abraham to be taken outside. Daramount demands to know where Irina is but the other Truants cannot give her an answer. Vanessa explains that she told them nothing other than that she wanted to kill the son of Abraham. Irina then arrives outside with her three hostages and a group of guards. She announces to the students that Ike is the cause of their suffering and that killing him will put everything right.

Older Jade explains what is going on to Hunter using a chess analogy. If a player suddenly jumps their bishop to the other side of the board and the other player has to allow it, they are not playing chess anymore. Then, if they return the bishop to its original location, the game has effectively been reset but the rules have changed. Jade reasons that this is what has happened to everyone at the Academy. She leads him to Casey and Hodge, telling him to be there for her. Casey touches the Cylinder and sets everyone to how they were before, causing Irina to lose her hypnosis abilities. Daramount then has the Truants arrested. Abraham is gone but he will return to them as they still have Ike. When Casey wakes up, Hunter asks what happened to her and she says she doesn't remember.

Two months earlier, Clarkson gets out of bed to comfort her baby son David.
"Demerits" (#30–34)

While the other Truants sit in cells, Irina wakes up in a small house and is greeted by Mr N, a member of the faculty who doesn't spent a lot of time at the Academy. He informs her that the Headmaster had suggested that she needs a more "individualized curriculum". He encourages her to relive her past in the Ukraine with her abusive mother who once paid for armed men to rape and kill her, challenging young Irina to murder them before they could. She reinforced the idea that love is weakness and attacked her daughter with a knife, forcing Irina to kill her. Unsure of what to do next, young Irina is approached by Clarkson, who says she has been looking for her. Mr N questions Irina about some insults she made to Daramount regarding her mother, revealing that they have the same one, although N believes it unlikely that Daramount is aware that she has another half-sister.

Hunter heads to the library to try to make sense of what he saw when he was with the older Jade. Miss Dagney holds a memorial for the dead students. Afterwards, Hunter goes into the woods and stands by the spot where Zoe was killed. He tells her that she wasn't mentioned in the memorial and that he doesn't know what the Academy did with her body but expresses remorse over not being able to talk her out of her murderous rage. He is interrupted by Esi, a member of the school's secret A.V. Club. She takes him to meet Hannah and Andres, the two other members. The A.V. Club is planning to expose the Academy's true nature using a secret newspaper but that only certain people whose "eyes have been opened" will be able to read it. Hunter mentions that he was not able to read his file when Hodge showed him it but Esi counters, saying that he was able to read their recruitment poster, suggesting that time-travelling with Jade had opened his eyes. The Club state that Hodge's ability means she will be dangerous. Hannah tells Hunter that before she died, Maggie encouraged them to seek him out.

Vanessa is in a different cell to the other Truants and can only talk to the person in the adjoining cell through a small hole. Hodge opens the door, saying she managed to convince the Headmaster to free her, something she has also secured for Guillaume, Ian and Fortunato. Vanessa is sceptical and believes Hodge is luring her into a trap but Hodge takes her to a small shrine. She explains that the shrine is similar to the cave and the tower and will enable them to travel back to the night before Vanessa's boyfriend Brendan was killed during the Truants plan to rescue Abraham. Hodge allows Vanessa to say goodbye to Brendan on the condition that she repay the favour, with a brief flashback suggesting this favour is going back to see a young Hodge and being killed. Hodge then heads to the other cell, which is revealed to be occupied by an older Vanessa.

Guillaume is the second Truant to be released. He is assigned to the same room as Ike, Hunter and Hisao. He attempts to speak to Hisao but is ignored. He later finds Hisao in the gym and attempts to apologize for what happened at the tower, telling him he would never allowed Irina to go through with her plan if he knew her sacrifice was Jun. Hisao refuses to talk so Guillaume challenges him to a boxing match. Flashbacks reveal that Hisao contacted Hodge after the destruction of Abraham's camp and informs her that the Academy has taken the wrong brother. Hodge tells him she can get him admitted to the Academy but that they cannot release Jun. Hisao writes a letter to Guillaume, declaring his love. As their fight intensifies, Guillaume tells Hisao how he never would have harmed Jun by choice because, even though he knew it wasn't Hisao, Jun would remind him of his first love and gave him hope that they would be together again. Hisao then admits to Guillaume that he is actually Jun and that, as his brother was comforting him before he died, Hisao begged to change places and, as a result, he was sacrificed instead of Jun and the two brothers switched bodies.

Casey wakes up Jade and they meet with Hunter, Ike, Jun, Guillaume and Vanessa so that they can hold a memorial for Hisao. Ike questions why Guillaume and Vanessa are present since their involvement with Irina was the cause of Hisao's death, with Vanessa apologizing for allowing herself to be used. Jade admits her guilt over not being able to express her gratitude to Hisao for rescuing her from the Nurses office and Guillaume expresses his regret over betraying Hisao and using their love as a weapon. Jun says he will burn the Academy to the ground and berates the others for failing at every opportunity to take down the faculty. Casey challenges him for leadership of the group. In a flashback, Jade cries over her mother's dead body. She begs for her to get up and inadvertently resurrects her.
"Honors" (#35–38)

In a flashback, Clarkson interrupts a group of human traffickers in Portugal and kills them in order to rescue their captive, Fortunato. Daramount, who had arranged the kidnapping, arrives moments later to take him away but Clarkson hypnotises her to forget they were there. In the present, Daramount enters Fortunato's cell and complains about how Hodge's releasing of the Truants undermines her authority and makes her look weak to the students and faculty. She then announces that she has overruled her sister when it comes to Fortunato, who will be made an example of. She proceeds to brutally mutilate him before gouging out his eyes with her fingers.

Ian is the final Truant to be released. He reunites with the rest of the A.V. Club and informs them that he overheard from his cell that some important people were being brought to the Academy under heavy guard. They observe the Academy's delivery point and see Daramount escorting Ian's father and Vanessa's mother. Flashbacks show that Ian was raised in a scientific facility as part of a longitudinal experiment by his father. Clarkson arrives to collect him but asks which child she is taking, as the room is full of identical children.

Still in a coma after offering herself as the sacrifice, Akiko dreams of being collected by Clarkson and taken to Abraham's camp, talking older Jade, questioning Ian about why he hasn't visited her and watching her own father's suicide. She then visits Fortunato and comforts him in his cell.

Hodge visits Gribbs who is in the hospital bed next to Akiko. She tells him the bullet missed his brain and he will make a full recovery before swearing that she will ensure he dies in the Academy one day. When Gribbs wakes up, he demands to now where Abraham is. In Marrakech, Abraham makes contact with Walid and Caleb, two of the few surviving children from his camp who were not captured by the Academy. Walid reveals that Vanessa's mother managed to smuggle five children out of the camp but that they have since separated from the othersin order to avoid detection. Abraham is taken to the safehouse where they have been staying and they tell him that, when they discovered he had been captured, they wanted to help but didn't know how but that someone encouraged them not to give up. Abraham enters the room and sees Zoe, who greets him as an old friend. Gribbs confronts Ike and takes him to Abraham's cell where he has Nine inject him with a drug which will help him use his familial connection to Abraham to find out his location. Initially, Ike is unable to provide an answer so Gribbs brutally beats him until he reveals that his father is in Morocco.
"Rivals" (#39–42)

The Academy announces that two popular extra-curricular events: towerball and the science fair, are to be reinstated following their postponing after the Truant's attempted coup. Casey visits Hodge and asks whether what she did in the past was successful and demands to know if her parents are alive. Hodge expresses bemusement that she can't remember her time as Clarkson but says that everything she went through was necessary to prepare her to take the next step in their plan. The student government has also been reinstated and Hodge tells Casey that she must run against Isabel, Casey's rival from her high school who she discovers was planted there alongside Clarkson to make her apply to the Academy. Isabel has run unopposed for years, even being elected in the two years she was undercover in Casey's school. Casey initially refuses to take part in anymore of Hodge's games but Hodge tells her that the Class President is the only student who is allowed to meet the Headmaster.

Miss Dagney introduced Vanessa's mother and Ian's father as guest teachers to help the students with their projects for the science fair. Vanessa is overjoyed to be reunited with her mother, although Daramount insists they be separated while Ian seems less thrilled about seeing his father again. The first edition of the A.V. Club's newspaper is released and is a huge success although the Club struggle to think of ideas for the next issue. Hunter says he overheard some guards talking about where they are holding Fortunato but Ian is convinced the guards are leaking the information deliberately so that those in charge of the newspaper can be apprehended. Ian visits Fortunato and expresses his anger that Akiko chose him before declaring his intention to kill Fortunato at a later date.

Flashbacks show that, after leaving Abraham's camp, Guillaume was placed with a foster family who were charged with raising him until he was old enough to infiltrate the Academy. He confides in his foster-sister about his love for Hisao and dreams about their time together. In the present, Guillaume is called into Gribbs' office. He states that, before he takes a sabbatical from the Academy to pursue Abraham, he has decided to make Guillaume captain of the blue towerball team as punishment for his actions aiding Irina. Hunter is confused about why this angers Guillaume but Andres explains that each season, the red team always wins regardless of how well the blue team play or the calibre of the players because the Headmaster has decided that the reds will always win. Guillaume meets with Jun and informs him that their plan has worked. At selection, Guillaume chooses Jun as part of his team, with the intention that they will lead the blue team to victory, undermining the Headmaster and proving to the other students that his word is not infallible. In return for his help, Jun wakes up Guillaume and tells him he needs his help. Leading him to the basement, Guillaume finds Jade being held captive. Jun states that the two of them will perform the ceremony and resurrect Hisao using Jade as the sacrifice.

Realising Jade is missing, Casey visits Hodge and demands to know where the Academy has taken her. She believes Hodge has kidnapped Jade so that Casey will be forced to run against Isabel and gain an audience with the Headmaster so that she can ask him her location. Hodge refutes this but says that she wants to help. In the basement, Guillaume tells Jun that they can't sacrifice Jade but he tells Guillaume to read her file and that will explain everything. Ian uses his father to gain access to a storage room the Academy and takes something that will help with his "science project". Visiting Fortunato in her dreams, Akiko worries about Ian, saying that without her presence, he starts acting strangely and that everyone should be on their guard. With word spreading around the Academy about Fortunato, Daramount his once again feared by the students. Hodge confronts her, believing that she took Jade but Daramount admits to having no idea where she is. Hodge doesn't believe her and warns that someday the students will gain the upper hand and she won't be able to protect her sister when they come for her.

Having no opponent, Isabel gives her victory speech to the student body but is interrupted by Casey who announces that she will be running for Class President.
"Assembly" (#43–46)

Ike is tormented by dreams of his father. He mocks Casey, who is struggling to distribute her flyers, for setting herself up for failure by not being radical enough. He receives a message from Dagney, asking him to meet her in the library. There, she shows him several books that give him visions of the past and future. He sees Abraham and Gribbs performing a cult-like ritual together over him as a baby and then killing a man who threatened to expose them. He also sees that the Academy are having Ian and Vanessa's parents spy on the students. Finally, he has a vision of his future self, who warns him that he will die alone and that he will watch the only girl he ever loves die over and over. After coming to, Ike asks Dagney who wrote the books and she tells him that he is the author. This prompts Ike to find Casey. He takes her to a room where he has assembled Hunter, Vanessa and Guillaume, and offers to be her campaign manager.

In the past, Clarkson visits Vanessa's mother. She remarks on how Ian's father has chosen to raise him as an experiment whereas Vanessa is living a seemingly normal life. Clarkson warns her that Daramount is on her way to the house and will kill her and take Vanessa but Clarkson offers to take them to Abraham's camp where they will be safe. Clarkson gives her two radios made with technology so that only she and Vanessa will be able to see and use them, so that the two can communicate once she is sent to the Academy. In the present, Vanessa's mother unsuccessfully makes repeated attempts to see her daughter and is captured by Daramount. Hodge makes a deal with her, saying she can grant her access to Vanessa for a few more days of compliance. As a show of good faith, Hodge tells Vanessa's mother about her part in Irina's plan and Brendan's death, saying that while she has potential, Vanessa has a great weakness in her. Ian's father invites the students to submit their ideas for the science fair and Vanessa announces that she is working on something that will disrupt the electromagnetic field around the Academy and allow them contact with the outside world.

Guillaume's teammates grow frustrated that he has chosen Jun because he is a terrible towerball player. Jun takes out his anger on Guillaume who is making him pretend to be a bad player to lull everyone into a false sense of security. In between practice and class, Guillaume cares for Jade, promising her she will be freed once Jun has played his part in the plan to undermine the Headmaster. Jade asks him what in her file makes it so that Jun believes it is acceptable to use her as the sacrifice and Guillaume explains that it is because she keeps trying to kill herself. Flashbacks show that after resurrecting her mother, Jade is constantly verbally abused by her. Knowing what she did, her mother calls her a devil and refuses to speak to her. Jade tells Guillaume that she is no longer suicidal, as her desire to live during the many attempts on her life mean she mustn't really want to die. She then asks why Jun didn't choose a guard as a sacrifice but Guillaume responds that there are specific parameters, namely, the fact that she has already brought someone back from the dead. Jade admits that she did revive her mother and Guillaume begs her to resurrect Hisao but she says that she can't because the person who is brought back is never the same. Flashbacks show that Jade's mother never loved her again. She meets with Clarkson, who offers her money to love Jade until she is ready to attend the Academy but her mother refuses. Clarkson then hypnotises Jade's mother to hang herself.

On her way to take Irina to Abraham's camp, Clarkson is outsmarted and Irina flees. In the present, Mr N. continues to train her. He asks if she is interested in a field trip and she correctly assumes that he has need of her skills. He states that he wants her to assassinate someone but that doing it himself would go against the rules of the Academy. Believing the target to be Clarkson, Irina agrees and the two transport to Marrakech, where N's target is revealed to be Zoe.
"Expulsion" (#47–50)

Ike organises a secret party and invites all of the students as a way to gain their votes in the election. Jun discovers that Guillaume has been looking after Jade and chastises him for it but he counters that their "deal" seems pretty one-sided as, while Jun simply has to play a towerball match, he is asking Guillaume to kill an innocent girl. Jun tells him that they have to keep Jade prisoner regardless because Casey is only running so that she can find out her location. Casey starts giving a speech to the guests but is interrupted by Isabel. Ike contacts Gribbs and tells him about the party. He arrives moments after Isabel with a group of guards and starts attacking the students. Ian congratulates Ike for making everyone think Isabel is responsible but mentions that it will not affect the outcome of the election, as his science fair project will ensure Casey's victory.

Isabel insults Casey, telling her that Jade is already dead and accuses her of cheating in a science fair back in high school, something which is revealed to be true via flashbacks when Clarkson is asked to choose the winner and, naturally, picks Casey. Dagney gathers the students outside for the first ever leadership debate. Isabel gives long, diplomatic, Academy-appeasing answers to each of the questions whereas Casey simply says that she doesn't care about menial things such as locker assignments or the upgrading of gym equipment and only wants to destroy the Academy and be free. Casey reveals to the students that the faculty killed her parents. Isabel then admits that her parents were also killed by the Academy but that she chooses to honor their memory by following the rules and living up to her potential. Vanessa's mother gives her radio to the future version of Vanessa held captive in the basement and gives present-day Vanessa instructions about how to tune hers. Ian takes Ike down to the mysterious Cylinder and tells him they are going to use it to cheat. He explains that Irina was able to gain the power of hypnotism from the Cylinder which enabled her to enact her initial plan. Ian then activates the Cylinder in the same way meaning that Casey will inadvertently hypnotise the students to vote for her.

Counting the ballots, Daramount is furious that Casey has won in a landslide and blames Hodge for putting their father in danger by allowing her to meet with him. Dagney then tell them the Headmaster is not in any danger and states that the Academy must stick to their word and officially declare Casey the winner. In the final of the towerball tournament, the blue and red team are tied with one game apiece after Guillaume forced the reds to forfeit one of their matches by poisoning them. Jun declares he is making his move but Guillaume insists that he wait until the correct time. At the science fair, Ian mocks Vanessa's entry. Dagney tells Casey she has won the election and takes her to meet the Headmaster. As the clock hits 8:13, Guillaume instructs Jun to enact their plan and he quickly scores enough goals for the blue team to win for the first time, proving the Headmaster's rules are not unbreakable. Simultaneously, Vanessa activates her radio and the future Vanessa responds, making everyone believe she has successfully contacted the outside world. Before entering the Headmaster's office, Casey asks why Dagney is letting her meet with him, knowing her plan is to kill him. Dagney then hands her a knife and asks her to do what she was unable to do when the Headmaster was a child. The combination of these events all occurring at 8:13 sends shockwaves through the Academy and Casey is knocked unconscious. She is woken by future Jade who tells she is not where she is supposed to be, that she's fallen into the Headmaster's trap and warns her not to believe anything he says.

Casey finally confronts the Headmaster. He says he's been wanting to talk to her for a while and offers to show her how everything she and the other students have been through has been for a purpose. He shows her monitors watching everyone in the school and invites her to watch with him. As the earthquake ravages the Academy, Vanessa's mother tells Vanessa they can use the opportunity to escape but Hodge, claiming to have always been on their side, begs her not to go. She asks Vanessa if she trusts her, to which she responds "no" and flees with her mother, who takes her to the cell of her future self. Ian nonchalantly tells his father they should continue with the fair and that it is his turn to show what he has been working on. He jokes about always being pulled in different directions, leading his father to ask where else he is. Another Ian arrives at Fortunato's cell and prepares to kill him as Akiko suddenly wakes from her coma. Using the earthquake as a distraction, Jun orders Guillaume down to the basement, saying it is time for Jade to be sacrificed. Desperate to save her life, Guillaume reveals that Jade can resurrect Hisao without the need of a sacrifice. Casey begs the Headmaster to let her help her friends and offers to give him whatever he wants but he simply states that there is nothing she can do. Vanessa struggles to understand how another her is in the cell but their mother insists there is no time. Jun gets more and more restless and Guillaume manages to convince Jade to try to bring back Hisao. Akiko interrupts Ian before he delivers the killing blow. Casey attempts to stab the Headmaster with Dagney's knife but he stops her by using telekinetic powers, lifting her into the air and forcing her to watch. Vanessa discovers that the Vanessa in the cell is from the future. When young Hodge drags her body from the cave, she is still alive, was placed into the cell and has been there ever since. Vanessa expresses her confusion, as knowing that Hodge betrays her means she won't agree to go back in time in the first place, meaning the future Vanessa in the cell won't exist. The other Vanessa then shoots and kills present Vanessa. Jade's resurrection doesn't work and Jun attempts to sacrifice her. Guillaume blocks his path and is accidentally killed instead. Akiko is unable to talk Ian out of killing Fortunato. The second Ian then appears behind her. Clearly unhinged, they both explain that nothing in the Academy is real and therefore, holds no consequence. The two Ians then strangle Akiko to death. Ian's father attempts to stop a third Ian, who is attempting to use the Cylinder to bend reality to his will, but he is unsuccessful; Ian is disintegrated by the Cylinder. The Headmaster expresses his pleasure that five of the six Truants have been killed and insists that something much worse is in store for Irina. As guards surround the other Glories, the Headmaster tells Casey he is not responsible for the death of her parents and that she made a mistake but is not ready to know the truth. He uses his powers to throw her out of a window and tells her to enjoy her "summer vacation". Casey then wakes up on a desert island.

== Collected editions ==
The series has been released in trade paperbacks (TPB) and "Deluxe Edition" hardcovers (HC). Detailed information of the releases is listed below.

#	Title	Release date	Page count	Collected issues	Cover price	TPB ISBN
1	Morning Glories Vol 1: For a Better Future	March, 2011	192	Morning Glories #1–6	$9.99	ISBN 1-60706-307-7
2	Morning Glories Vol 2: All Will Be Free	August, 2011	168	Morning Glories #7–12	$12.99	ISBN 1-60706-407-3
3	Morning Glories Vol 3: P.E.	June, 2012	240	Morning Glories #13–19	$14.99	ISBN 1-60706-558-4
4	Morning Glories Vol 4: Truants	April, 2013	216	Morning Glories #20–25	$14.99	ISBN 1-60706-727-7
5	Morning Glories Vol 5: Tests	September, 2013	136	Morning Glories #26–29	$12.99	ISBN 1-60706-774-9
6	Morning Glories Vol 6: Demerits	December, 2013	144	Morning Glories #30–34	$14.99	ISBN 1-60706-823-0
7	Morning Glories Vol 7: Honors	June, 2014	124	Morning Glories #35–38	$12.99	ISBN 1-60706-943-1
8	Morning Glories Vol 8: Rivals	March, 2015	120	Morning Glories #39–42	$12.99	ISBN 1-63215-140-5
9	Morning Glories Vol 9: Assembly	November, 2015	104	Morning Glories #43–46	$12.99	ISBN 1-63215-560-5
10	Morning Glories Vol 10: Expulsion	August, 2016	136	Morning Glories #47–50	$14.99	ISBN 1-63215-732-2

#	Title	Release date	Page count	Collected issues	Cover price	TPB ISBN
1	Morning Glories Vol 1 Compendium TP	December, 2014	1048?	Morning Glories #1–38	$59.99	ISBN 978-1632152138

#	Title	Release date	Page count	Collected issues	Cover price	HC ISBN
1	Morning Glories Vol 1 Deluxe Edition	November, 2011	352	Morning Glories #1–12	$49.99	ISBN 978-1-60706-430-5
2	Morning Glories Vol 2 Deluxe Edition	October, 2013	480	Morning Glories #13–25	$49.99	ISBN 978-1-60706-793-1
3	Morning Glories Vol 3 Deluxe Edition	October, 2014	440	Morning Glories #26–38	$49.99	ISBN 978-1-63215-164-3
