= John Steele (comics) =

Publication information
- Publisher: Timely Comics; Marvel Comics
- First appearance: Daring Mystery Comics #1 (January 1940)
- Created by: Dean Carr

In-story information
- Full name: John Steele
- Team affiliations: Shadow Council
- Abilities: Expert hand-to-hand combatant Superhuman strength, speed, stamina and durability Healing factor

John Steele is a fictional character, a superhuman World War II soldier appearing in American comic books published by Marvel Comics.

== Publication history ==
The character first appeared in Daring Mystery Comics #1 and was created by Larry Antonette (under the pseudonym Dean Carr). The character received a modern revamp in Ed Brubaker and Steve Epting's The Marvels Project and has made a reappearance as an antagonist in Brubaker's Secret Avengers where, as he's introduced, in the caption it reads "America's real first Super-Soldier" supposedly meaning that Steele was the predecessor of Captain America.

== Fictional character biography ==
John Steele was an American soldier serving during the Civil War and in the trenches in World War I. Through unrevealed means, he possessed super-human strength and durability. He aided French spy Marie Antoinette in delivering plans to General Joseph Carr.

Sometime during the end of World War I, John Steele was captured by the Germans and held in suspended animation for study. Over the years many scientists tried to study his body to discover the source of his abilities. Among the many scientists to do so was Abraham Erskine, creator of the Super-Soldier Formula. Steele was freed from captivity by an Allied bombing. Despite having been in stasis for 20 years, Steele went right back to fighting Germans, this time in secret behind enemy lines. He eventually ran into a secret Allied military unit composed of Nick Fury, Red Hargrove, and the Sky Devils. Steele stayed with Fury and the men until they were called back to the States. Steele decided to remain behind for two reasons; first because he did not want to return home to be a guinea pig, and second because he wanted to track down the Red Skull. He discovered the Red Skull's allegiance with the Japanese and the renegade Atlantean U-Man and how all three parties were planning the attack on Pearl Harbor and an assassination attempt on Winston Churchill. Steele continued to battle the Nazis behind enemy lines until he disappeared shortly after the Invasion of Normandy.

The character later appeared working for the Shadow Council in Secret Avengers. Steve Rogers and his Secret Avengers squad capture Steele and Rogers has Beast use a machine to access Steele's memories to find out why he joined the Shadow Council. It is revealed that Steele was captured by the Shadow Council while teaming with Rogers on a mission in 1943. Steele gets his mind back and Rogers offers him a chance to get back at the Council.

Max Fury and the Masters of Evil capture John Steele after he attempts to escape Bagalia with the Serpent Crown and the Crown of Thorns. John Steele ends up killed by Max Fury.

== Powers and abilities ==
John Steele has superhuman strength, speed, durability and stamina. The extent of these abilities is unknown, but he is strong enough to easily bend steel, fast enough to out-fight Captain America and bulletproof. John possesses a healing factor and is an expert in hand-to-hand combat.
