= Secret Avengers =

Fictional comic book group

- Cover to Secret Avengers, #1 (May 2010). Art by Marko Djurdjević.

Series publication information
- Schedule: Monthly
- Format: Ongoing series
- Genre: Superhero
- Publication date: July 2010 – April 2015

Creative team
- Writer(s): Ed Brubaker; Nick Spencer; Warren Ellis; Rick Remender
- Artist(s): Mike Deodato; David Aja; Michael Lark; Stefano Gaudiano; Will Conrad; Scot Eaton; Jamie McKelvie; Kev Walker; Alex Maleev; John Cassaday; Gabriel Hardman
- Editor(s): Tom Brevoort; Joe Quesada; Lauren Sankovitch

Secret Avengers

Group publication information
- Publisher: Marvel Comics
- First appearance: Secret Avengers #1 (July 2010)

In-story information
- Type of organization: Team
- Leader(s): Maria Hill; Nick Fury Jr. Phil Coulson

Roster

Secret Avengers is an American comic book series published by Marvel Comics featuring a fictional black ops superhero team of the same name. The series started with Ed Brubaker on writing duties, depicting a black-ops sect of Marvel's premier super hero team, the Avengers, which operates under the guidance and leadership of Captain Steve Rogers (the former Captain America). The series is part of the Avengers-line relaunch as part of the "Heroic Age".

== Publication history ==
Writer Ed Brubaker and artist Mike Deodato were announced as the creative team for the Secret Avengers title. A series of teaser images were released by Marvel to promote the upcoming series in February 2010, which slowly revealed the team's roster over the course of two months. The series started in late May 2010 (cover date July 2010).

As of the first issue, the roster includes Beast, War Machine, Valkyrie, Moon Knight, Nova, Black Widow, Sharon Carter and Ant-Man and the team is led by Steve Rogers. In regards to the tone of the new title, Brubaker has said:

Secret Avengers is definitely going to have a lot of the espionage plots and the Steranko influence, and the crazy Kirby technology, but I don't think there's going to be much soap opera. I hope it feels different than any Avengers team, ever.

After Brubaker left the title, author Nick Spencer wrote the first Secret Avengers "Point One" issue (#12.1) and three Fear Itself tie-in one-shots. Secret Avengers was then written by Warren Ellis from issues #16-21 and scribe Rick Remender picked up at #21.1 with former Hulk artist, Gabriel Hardman. Remender confirmed that his final issue of Secret Avengers will be with issue #37.

At New York ComiCon 2012 it was announced that the title would be relaunched as part of the Marvel NOW! initiative, with Nick Spencer returning as writer. Spencer said, "This really is a S.H.I.E.L.D. book. I think it's something we've been long suffering for and is long overdue. This gave us a nice excuse to get a proper S.H.I.E.L.D. comic going. This Avengers initiative within S.H.I.E.L.D. is obviously a big focal point of the book, but it still is a S.H.I.E.L.D initiative so everything originates there. So Nick Fury and Agent Coulson are very much involved in the missions. Nick will be in the field with the team. That's his role. He's the S.H.I.E.L.D agent that goes with these characters on the missions. Coulson has a fun role in that he's backup and support. He's the guy who makes the pitch, and brings in the team. So they're a big part of every issue and in some ways they're even our leads.

The third volume was cancelled with #15 in April, 2015.

== Fictional history ==
=== Volume 1 ===
After the events of "Dark Reign" and Siege, Norman Osborn was deposed as America's "top cop" and his organization H.A.M.M.E.R. was disbanded. In response to his hand in reforming the original Avengers and staving off the Siege of Asgard, the President appointed former Captain America Steve Rogers as America's new foremost law enforcement agent, as well as dissolving the Superhuman Registration Act at Rogers' request. Rogers forms the Secret Avengers as a group of superheroes to operate under a veil of secrecy, in addition to the main Avengers team.

The opening issues show the team being proactive about known threats and cleaning them up, black ops style. They are in direct opposition to a group called the "Shadow Council" seemingly led by Nick Fury. In one such plot they find a dangerous artifact, the Tentacle Crown. After some research the group finds a link to the Roxxon Corporation, which leads to investigations of a mining site on Mars. Richard Rider is on the case, and in his investigations he finds another crown, the Serpent Crown. The crown possesses Nova, but he is pursued by a guardian of the crown claiming to be a collective named the Archon who was created by the Watchers. The possessed Nova directs Shadow Council agents into unearthing a primordial evil. Steve Rogers, with the help of the Xandarian Worldmind, temporarily gains the Nova Force to take out the Serpent Crown/Nova.

The Secret Avengers later have to deal with the fact that someone resembling Nick Fury is shown to be working for the Shadow Council. The real Fury confirms that what they are seeing is a self-aware Life Model Decoy modified by Jake Fury. S.H.I.E.L.D. was going to destroy the LMD, but he was rescued by the Shadow Council and given the name Max. Some other operatives in the Shadow Council are an immortal named Aloysius Thorndrake and former Golden Age hero John Steele.

Shang-Chi offers himself as bait in order to capture his immortal father, Zheng Zu, who needs the blood of a relative to stay alive. Ant-Man accidentally foils that plan, but later the team falls into a trap where Carter is kidnapped. Shang-Chi volunteers to exchange himself for her, but during the exchange Moon Knight disguises himself as a Shadow Council guard. He is able to lead the team to stop the sacrificial ceremony. John Steele is apprehended and Captain America is able to delve into his memories and figures out that because of his actions during a WW2 mission, Steele ended up getting kidnapped and brain washed by the Shadow Council.

During the "Fear Itself" crossover, the Secret Avengers are summoned to defend Washington DC. Beast meets with an old congressman friend, who turns out to be an mutant with the ability to animate statues. In issue 14, Valkyrie's origin story is revealed.

Max Fury and the Shadow Council form a new incarnation of the Masters of Evil, consisting of Princess Python, Vengeance, and Whiplash. The Secret Avengers discover them during a mission run by Captain America, who is testing Hawkeye's leadership skills before making him the new team leader.

Giant-Man, Captain Britain, and the original Human Torch join the Secret Avengers with investigating a new threat called the Descendants, an army of synthezoids. During the battle it seems that Ant-Man is killed and Torch is severely damaged, but Agent Venom rescues the team. Ant-Man reappears uninjured.

The team then crosses over into the Avengers vs. X-Men event. They attempt to intercept the Phoenix Force, but fail to stop it, even with Thor's help. They land in the Kree home world Hala, but Protector and Carol Danvers are subdued by the Kree Hive-mind, which is being manipulated into inviting the Phoenix Force, which is heading for Hala. Vision is able to break the control and Mar-Vell sacrifices himself to stop the Phoenix, which spares Hala.

The Masters of Evil realize John Steele is a double agent, but are able to keep the mystic crowns and even steal the third from Taskmaster, then unleash an evil force called the Abyss on Bagalia, that controls the minds of the Masters and the Avengers. Venom and Ant-Man were immune and are able to separate the three crowns. Black Widow suspects that Ant-Man is a LMD, since he was not affected by the Abyss, but her suspicions are dismissed by Hawkeye due to Ant-Man's heroic actions, causing her to quit in protest.

The Descendants (with the addition of the Human Torch who was reprogrammed to serve them) launched a massive attack on the main cities of the world, starting an invasion to take it and launched a nano-mist, which slowly started turning every human into Descendants. The Secret Avengers fought them, and Human Torch {who Captain Britain made come into his senses} managed to destroy the Orb of Necromancy, which killed every single one of the Descendants of the High-Breed and eliminated the nano-mist from any human. Before dying, the Father told Captain Britain he still felt the presence of another Descendant who didn't die. In the aftermath, the Secret Avengers reunited with Captain America to tell him what happened. Time later, Hawkeye decided to disassemble the unit.

=== Volume 2 ===
As part of the Marvel NOW! event, a new version of the Secret Avengers is formed under the jurisdiction of S.H.I.E.L.D. A mysterious traveler from the future attacks a battalion of S.H.I.E.L.D. agents before he is killed. Following the attack, Maria Hill decides to form S.H.I.E.L.D.'s version of the Secret Avengers. Maria Hill is able to recruit Hawkeye, Black Widow, Nick Fury Jr., and Phil Coulson. Their first operation is to foil a plan of the terrorist group Al-Qaeda from using teleportation knowledge given by Andras Bertesy to execute a terrorist attack on the United States. The Secret Avengers follow the terrorist group to Budapest, where they get the coordinates of the attack from one of their members. After Hawkeye is left to be rescued by Black Widow, Nick Fury Jr. sets a trap for the Al-Qaeda member who was going to perform the attack, by waiting him in the Oval Office to kill him.

In the second mission, the Secret Avengers raid Bagalia and fight through the Masters of Evil, in order to free Taskmaster, who is going to be auctioned off to the highest bidder. Mockingbird joins up with them, using S.H.I.E.L.D. Camo-Tech to masquerade as Aloysius Thorndrake of the Shadow Council. Nick Fury Jr. pays Crossfire to let Taskmaster out of his cell. After Taskmaster agrees to join the Secret Avengers, he goes on a mission to infiltrate A.I.M.'s new High Council (consisting of Andrew Forson, Graviton, Jude the Entropic Man, Mentallo, Superia, and Yelena Belova).

When Daisy Johnson and Nick Fury Jr. were attending the weapons expo, they meet up with Senator Robert Ralston. Daisy notices that one of the items at the expo is the Iron Patriot armor. A.I.M. then attacks the weapons expo which leads to the supposed death of Ralston during A.I.M.'s fight with the Secret Avengers. During the fight, Forson steals the Iron Patriot armor.

Director Daisy Johnson gave Nick Fury, Hawkeye, and Black Widow the Protocol D which is the assassination of the A.I.M. Scientist Supreme. Hulk was recruited to help with the mission when A.I.M. duplicates the technology of the Iron Patriot armor to create an army of sentient drones that A.I.M. would use to incriminate the United States in numerous international attacks. Hulk was able to destroy the Iron Patriot drones that were attacking Iran. Meanwhile, Phil Coulson talks to War Machine about the Iron Patriot armor.

The Secret Avengers raid A.I.M. Island and seemingly killed Andrew Forson. Daisy Johnson ended up suspended for breaking protocol and Maria Hill is put in charge of S.H.I.E.L.D. again. As Andrew Forson was revealed to be alive all along, the news of A.I.M. being a new permanent member of the Security Council is known.

Using holographic communication, S.H.I.E.L.D. hacked into A.I.M.'s network and allowed Rhodes to talk to the suits, who recognized him as "the Pilot", along Tony Stark being "the Maker". Rhodey managed to make the Iron Patriot army understand their actions of abruptly attacking tactical points of enemies of the US was unacceptable, and stated he could teach them better if he could show them, for what the androids sent Rhodes a different version of Iron Patriot armor.

After the mission goes south and Mockingbird is left stranded on A.I.M. Island, Taskmaster works undercover to free her. But when he gets the chance to get her off the island, she doesn't respond to anything he says until both are captured. Later while being interrogated, Taskmaster is shot and seemingly killed by Mockingbird who is now under the control of Andrew Forson.

=== Volume 3 ===
In the All-New Marvel NOW!, a new Secret Avengers team was assembled consisting of Nick Fury Jr., Black Widow, Phil Coulson, and Spider-Woman. Hawkeye rejoins the team, sometime later. The series was cancelled in 2015, after 15 issues.

== Roster ==
=== Original Team (2010–2013) ===
Character	Real Name	Joined In	Notes
Commander Steve Rogers	Steven Rogers	Secret Avengers #1 (May 2010)	Current leader of the main Avengers team (as Captain America). Left this team in Secret Avengers #22
Black Widow	Natalia Alianovna Romanova (a.k.a. Natasha Romanoff)	Secret Avengers #1 (May 2010)	Left team in Secret Avengers #32 due to suspicions about Eric O'Grady. Rejoins team in Secret Avengers #34
Beast	Dr. Henry Philip "Hank" McCoy	Secret Avengers #1 (May 2010)	Left team in Secret Avengers #37
Valkyrie	Brunnhilde	Secret Avengers #1 (May 2010)	Left team in Secret Avengers #37
Moon Knight	Marc Spector	Secret Avengers #1 (May 2010)	Last appeared as members in Secret Avengers #21
Agent 13	Sharon Carter	Secret Avengers #1 (May 2010)	Last appeared as members in Secret Avengers #21
War Machine	James Rupert "Rhodey" Rhodes	Secret Avengers #1 (May 2010)	Last appeared as members in Secret Avengers #21
Ant-Man	Eric O'Grady	Secret Avengers #1 (May 2010)	Suggested killed in Secret Avengers #23. Revealed alive in Secret Avengers #24. Hinted at secretly being replaced with a robot in Secret Avengers #25. The circumstances over whether or not O'Grady is dead remain unclear. Confirmed in #30 as being a double agent controlled by "The Father".
Nova	Richard Rider	Secret Avengers #1 (May 2010)	Left in Secret Avengers #5. Died during the events of The Thanos Imperative.

=== Shattered Heroes recruits ===
Character	Real Name	Joined In	Notes
Hawkeye	Clint Barton	Secret Avengers #21.1 (January 2012)	Former leader of Secret Avengers. Leaves Team in Secret Avengers Vol. 2 #16. Rejoins team in Secret Avengers Vol. 3 #3.
Captain Britain	Brian Braddock	Secret Avengers #22 (February 2012)	Left team in Secret Avengers #37
Human Torch	Jim Hammond (alias)	Secret Avengers #22 (February 2012)	Left team in Secret Avengers #37
Giant-Man	Henry "Hank" Pym	Secret Avengers #22 (February 2012)	Left team in Secret Avengers #37
Agent Venom	Flash Thompson	Secret Avengers #23 (February 2012)	Left team in Secret Avengers #37

=== Marvel NOW! recruits ===
Following the Avengers vs. X-Men storyline and the fight against the Descendants, S.H.I.E.L.D. takes direct control of the Secret Avengers' operations.

Character	Real Name	Joined In	Notes
Maria Hill		Secret Avengers Vol. 2 #1 (February 2013)	S.H.I.E.L.D. leadership.
Marcus Johnson	Nick Fury Jr.	Secret Avengers Vol. 2 #1 (February 2013)	S.H.I.E.L.D. leadership.
Phil Coulson		Secret Avengers Vol. 2 #1 (February 2013)	S.H.I.E.L.D. leadership.
Mockingbird	Barbara "Bobbi" Morse	Secret Avengers Vol. 2 #2	Leaves team in Secret Avengers Vol. 2 #16
Taskmaster	Tony Masters	Secret Avengers Vol. 2 #2	
Hulk	Dr. Robert Bruce Banner	Secret Avengers Vol. 2 #4	Last seen as member in Secret Avengers Vol. 2 #15
Iron Patriot	James "Rhodey" Rhodes	Secret Avengers Vol. 2 #6	Leaves team in Secret Avengers Vol. 2 #16
Sarah Garza		Secret Avengers Vol. 2 #10	Leaves team in Secret Avengers Vol. 2 #11

=== All-New Marvel NOW! recruits ===
Character	Real Name	Joined In	Notes
Spider-Woman	Jessica Drew	Secret Avengers Vol. 3 #1	

=== Honorary ===
These characters temporary joined the team to help on that particular mission.

Character	Real Name	Joined In	Notes
Prince of Orphans	John Aman	Secret Avengers #6 (October 2010)	Turned to villainy to oppose the Defenders in Defenders vol. 4 #6 (July 2012).
Shang-Chi		Secret Avengers #10 (February 2011)	Left after believing he had adequately repaid the favor he owed Steve Rogers in Secret Avengers #18 (December 2011).
Thor	Thor Odinson	Secret Avengers #26 (June 2012)	Temporarily joined as part of a strike team against the Phoenix Force.
Ms. Marvel	Carol Danvers	Secret Avengers #26 (June 2012)	Temporarily joined as part of a strike team against the Phoenix Force.
The Protector	Noh-Varr	Secret Avengers #26 (June 2012)	Temporarily joined as part of a strike team against the Phoenix Force.
Vision	Victor Shade (alias)	Secret Avengers #26 (June 2012)	Temporarily joined as part of a strike team against the Phoenix Force.
Winter Soldier	James Buchanan "Bucky" Barnes	Secret Avengers vol. 2 #1 (January 2013)	Ally of the Secret Avengers during the Marvel NOW! new series. It has been hinted that not being an official member, Barnes takes issue with how S.H.I.E.L.D. erases the team's memories after missions; given how his lover and teammate Black Widow had her memory of him erased after an altercation in which she was brainwashed by one of his enemies.

== Collected editions ==
Title	Material Collected	Publication Date	ISBN
Volume 1
Secret Avengers, Vol. 1: Mission to Mars	Secret Avengers #1–5	January 19, 2011	978-0785146001
Secret Avengers, Vol. 2: Eyes of the Dragon	Secret Avengers #6–12	July 6, 2011	978-0785166894
Secret Avengers by Ed Brubaker: The Complete Collection	Secret Avengers #1-12	June 12, 2018	978-1302912192
Fear Itself: Secret Avengers	Secret Avengers #12.1, 13–15; Fear Itself: Black Widow #1	February 22, 2012	978-0785151777
Secret Avengers, Vol. 3: Run the Mission, Don't Get Seen, Save the World	Secret Avengers #16–21	April 11, 2012	978-0785152569
Secret Avengers by Rick Remender Vol. 1: The Descendants	Secret Avengers #21.1, 22–25	August 8, 2012	978-0785161189
Secret Avengers by Rick Remender Vol. 2: Avengers vs. X-Men	Secret Avengers #26–32	December 5, 2012	978-0785161202
Secret Avengers by Rick Remender Vol. 3: Rise of the Descendants	Secret Avengers #33-37	April 2, 2013	978-0785161226
Secret Avengers by Rick Remender: The Complete Collection	Secret Avengers #21.1, 22-37	April 9, 2019	978-1302916435
Volume 2
Secret Avengers Vol. 1: Reverie	Secret Avengers (vol. 2) #1-5, material from Marvel Now ! Point One	September 17, 2013	978-0785166887
Secret Avengers Vol. 2: Iliad	Secret Avengers (vol. 2) #6-11	March 11, 2014	978-0785166894
Secret Avengers Vol. 3: How to MA.I.M. a Mockingbird	Secret Avengers (vol. 2)#12-16	May 6, 2014	978-0785184829
Volume 3
Secret Avengers Vol. 1: Let's Have a Problem	Secret Avengers (vol. 3) #1-5, Original Sin: Secret Avengers Infinite Comic #1-2	November 11, 2014	978-0785190523
Secret Avengers Vol. 2: The Labyrinth	Secret Avengers (vol. 3) #6-10	April 7, 2015	978-0785190530
Secret Avengers Vol. 3: God Level	Secret Avengers (vol. 3) #11-15	July 7, 2015	978-0785197102

== In other media ==
=== Television ===
The Secret Avengers appear in Avengers Assemble. In the episode "Avengers Disassembled", Captain America leaves the Avengers, joins S.H.I.E.L.D., and forms the Secret Avengers with Black Widow, the Falcon, and the Hulk. In the episode "The Ultron Outbreak", the Secret Avengers rejoin the original Avengers to defeat Ultron.

=== Film ===
The Secret Avengers serve as inspiration for films set in the Marvel Cinematic Universe (MCU):

- In Captain America: The Winter Soldier (2014), Captain America wears a suit based on the "Super Soldier" suit worn by Steve Rogers in Secret Avengers Vol. 1.
- While not directly referred to as such in Avengers: Infinity War (2018), Captain America, Black Widow, Wanda Maximoff, and the Falcon are depicted as an independent group following their separation from the Avengers in the preceding film Captain America: Civil War. Co-director Joe Russo confirmed on the audio commentary for Infinity War that this team is the MCU incarnation of the Secret Avengers.

=== Video games ===
- Captain America's "Super Soldier" suit from Secret Avengers Vol. 1 appears as a DLC costume for Captain America in Marvel vs. Capcom 3: Fate of Two Worlds.
- Captain America's "Super Soldier" suit from Secret Avengers Vol. 1 appears as an unlockable costume for Captain America in Marvel's Avengers.
