= Sins Rising =

2020 Spider-Man comic storyline

- Publisher: Marvel Comics
- Publication date: July – October 2020
- Genre: Superhero
Title(s)
The Amazing Spider-Man Vol 5 #45–49, Amazing Spider-Man Vol 1 #850
- Main characters: Spider-Man; Sin-Eater; Norman Osborn; Miles Morales; Spider-Gwen; Cindy Moon

Creative team
- Writer: Nick Spencer
- Artists: Mark Bagley; Ryan Ottley; Marcelo Ferreira

Sins Rising is a 2020 comic book storyline published by Marvel Comics, starring the character Spider-Man and written by Nick Spencer. The storyline received generally positive reviews for its action, plot, dialogue and art. The storyline lasts from Amazing Spider-Man Vol 5 Issue 45–49, and Amazing Spider-Man: Sins of Norman Osborn #1.

== Plot ==
Peter Parker is getting visions of a centipede going into his arm and has troubled dreams. Meanwhile, Sin-Eater attacks Overdrive as he is driving, which causes the car to flip over. Spider-Man takes Overdrive to a safe house and learns his identity. Spider-Man tries fighting against Sin-Eater but Sin-Eater distracts Spider-Man and shoots a bullet that passes through Spider-Man and hits Overdrive, wounding him severely. Sin-Eater disappears in smoke, and Spider-Man takes Overdrive to Carlie Cooper, where Overdrive suddenly revives.

A few days later, Spider-Man is fighting against the Lethal Legion during a public event when Sin-Eater arrives and shoots the Lethal Legion while absorbing their power. Using Grey Gargoyle's power, Sin-Eater turns Spider-Man to stone temporarily and shoots the rest of the Lethal Legion. Sin-Eater tells Spider-Man saying his methods for dealing with criminals does not work anymore before freeing him. One of Peter Parker's ex-colleagues, Norah Winters, interviews Norman Osborn, who is rehabilitated and in charge of the Ravencroft prison. Spider-Man asks Carlie Cooper why is Overdrive alive and in life support, and Carlie explains that he was beaten by a group of corrupt police officers. Norah is ambushed by Sin-Eater, who gives her a tape of him explaining his ideology and how he will cleanse everyone's sins and give them power. Spider-Man sneaks into Sin-Eater's headquarters at Union Square and fights against Sin-Eater, but is overwhelmed. Sin-Eater explains that he will cleanse Norman Osborn's sins before unleashing his minions on Spider-Man.

Miles Morales saves Spider-Man while New York is in chaos. Sin-Eater's minions storm Ravencroft. Miles tries persuading Spider-Man to let Norman Osborn be cleansed, stating that his universe's version of Green Goblin killed Spider-Man, but Spider-Man ignores Miles and goes to Ravencroft. Ghost-Spider arrives and helps Spider-Man, and Spider-Man realizes Spider-Gwen talked to Miles. Spider-Man meets with Julia Carpenter who tells him to let Norman get cleansed, or else Norman will kill again. Spider-Man thinks for a moment, then decides to save Norman. Meanwhile, Cindy Moon, Anya Corazon, Miles, and Ghost-Spider meet up with Julia Carpenter, and Julia decides they need to stop Spider-Man. They form the Order of the Web.

The Order of the Web reveal that the reason they want to stop Spider-Man from saving Norman Osborn is because they all had a vision where they see Peter Parker being killed in various places (Queens, Brooklyn Bridge, Empire State Building, and the Avengers mansion). The Order of the Web believes that Norman is responsible. Miles and Silk are confused on why Spider-Man won't let Sin-Eater shoot him and Ghost-Spider tells them that if Spider-Man lets Norman die, he fears that he will pay the price and is making the deal with the devil. Meanwhile, Mister Negative asks Sin-Eater to cleanse his sins, to which Sin-Eater complies. Sin-Eater arrives in Ravencroft and breaks open a vault that contained the Juggernaut. Norman explains that after he regained his memory for unknown reasons, he became the director of Ravencroft and has been using his old cell to spy on the prisoners. Sin-Eater shoots the Juggernaut when he attacks him. Spider-Man gets angry at Norman, but Norman reveals he only kept Juggernaut because of Kindred and the only way to stop Sin-Eater is by working together.

Spider-Man reluctantly teams up with Norman Osborn (who ingested the Green Goblin formula) and they fight off Sin-Eater's minions. Sin-Eater grows into a hulking beast and attacks Spider-Man and Green Goblin who barely escape. Spider-Man realizes that teaming up with Green Goblin is difficult because they had never worked together. Julia Carpenter uses an astral projection for all the spider heroes to observe what Spider-Man is doing because they want to wait for the right moment, as well as Sin-Eater being an unpredictable factor. Spider-Gwen decides to side with Peter Parker because she trusts him as this is his fight, they could be making it worse and play it right into someone's hand. Meanwhile, Green Goblin reveals he has an underground waterway beneath Ravencroft, and Sin-Eater overwhelms them again. Spider-Man gives them a distraction by webbing the ceiling and slamming it down on Sin-Eater, but he is caught in the rubble. Green Goblin reveals that he hated Spider-Man because Peter rejected him, but decides to save him by lifting the rubble. They go to the underground waterway, where Norman has an electromagnetic pulse that could cause a blackout at the Eastern Seaboard. Sin-Eater arrives and fights them once more. Spider-Man and Norman briefly gain the advantage because they now have a common enemy, but are overwhelmed by Sin-Eater. Green Goblin asks Spider-Man how did he stop the Juggernaut, and Spider-Man reveals that he stopped the Juggernaut by trapping Juggernaut in wet concrete. Spider-Man reveals the EMP has a compression generator, and wants Green Goblin to aim the EMP toward the ground to make the concrete wet. The plan is successful and Spider-Man slams Sin-Eater into the wet concrete. Just before Spider-Man sinks, he remembers Mary Jane Watson and briefly breaks free, trying to shoot webbing at a ceiling but Green Goblin cuts the webbing, telling him that his debt is already paid. Green Goblin tries to drown Spider-Man, but Spider-Gwen saves him. The spider heroes revealed they were about to stop Spider-Man from saving Norman but Spider-Gwen persuaded them not to. They get into a ship, but Green Goblin overhears Spider-Man calling Spider-Gwen "Gwen" and realizes her true identity. Norman starts harassing her, asking her if she is a clone and alluding to the fact that he and Gwen Stacy had an affair. Spider-Man gets angry and slams Norman to a wall, and Norman says that if he keeps him here, he will kill and harm everyone Spider-Man loved. Miles Morales tells Spider-Man to calm down, and Norman tells Spider-Man to listen to Miles, after all Spider-Man would not want to snap. Fed up, Spider-Man makes the decision and throws Norman off the ship into the concrete before leaving on his ship. Meanwhile, Kindred arrives in a graveyard planning his next scheme.

== Reception ==
According to the review aggregator website Comic Book Roundup, Issue 45 received an Average review of 7.9 out of 10 based on 10 reviews. Kevin Kelein from Cosmic Crusaders wrote "I can't get enough of Peter Parker's Spiderman and this issue doesn't disappoint. It includes all the ingredients of a great Spiderman story."

According to Comic Book roundup, Issue 46 received an average review of 8 out of 10 based on 9 reviews. wolfcypher from Weird Marvel Comics wrote "I really have no idea how any of this is going to tie into Spencer's Kindred story anymore. This issue really cements the idea that this is just its own story, independent of whatever Spider-Man's bigger mystery villain has in store. I'm not seeing what it is that connects the two, besides Kindred being the one to revive Stan Carter and supercharge him with his supernatural enhancements. Even with that said, this issue has a lot going for it. Whether its a bigger piece of an unfinished/still-ongoing work of art or maybe it's its own tapestry, it's shaping to be a fine design."

According to Comic Book Roundup, Issue 47 received an average review of 7.6 out of 10 based on 6 reviews. Kevin Lainez from Comic Book Revolution wrote "Amazing Spider-Man #47 was an intense reading experience. The way Nick Spencer works real world events in the way Sin-Eater is written gave weight to the character's direction that came across as distinct. How that challenges Spider-Man and furthers the greater Kindred storyline added to the interest in where the "Sins Rising" will end up when all things are said and done."

According to Comic Book Roundup, Issue 48 received an Average review of 8.4 out of 10 based on 8 reviews. David Brooke from AIPT wrote "The Amazing Spider-Man #48 is a breakdown of what makes Spider-Man tick, and perhaps one of the finest and most introspective looks at the Green Goblin and Spider-Man dynamic ever made."

According to Comic Book Roundup, Amazing Spider-Man: The Sins of Norman Osborn received an average review of 7.8 out of 10 based on 9 reviews. Deron Generally from The Super Powered Fancast wrote "Federico Vicentini has some awesome, action-packed art that reflects the tension and tone of the story. There is an emotional element to the art that Vicentini is able to bring out through the panels especially in the moments between Norman and Peter. The reveal of the prisoner being kept at the bottom of the institute is handled brilliantly as well."

According to Comic book Roundup, Issue 49 received an Average review of 7.5 out of 10 based on 13 reviews. Jimmy Hayes from Comic Watch wrote "An issue that's truly worthy of its epic numbering (#850). You're gonna have a great time reading this one!!"

== Collected edition ==
Title	Material collected	Published date	ISBN
Amazing Spider-Man by Nick Spencer Vol. 9: Sins Rising	Amazing Spider-Man (vol. 5) #44–49, Amazing Spider-Man: Sins Rising #1, Amazing Spider-Man: Sins of Norman Osborn #1	November 2020	978-1302920241
