= Nick Spencer =

American comic book writer

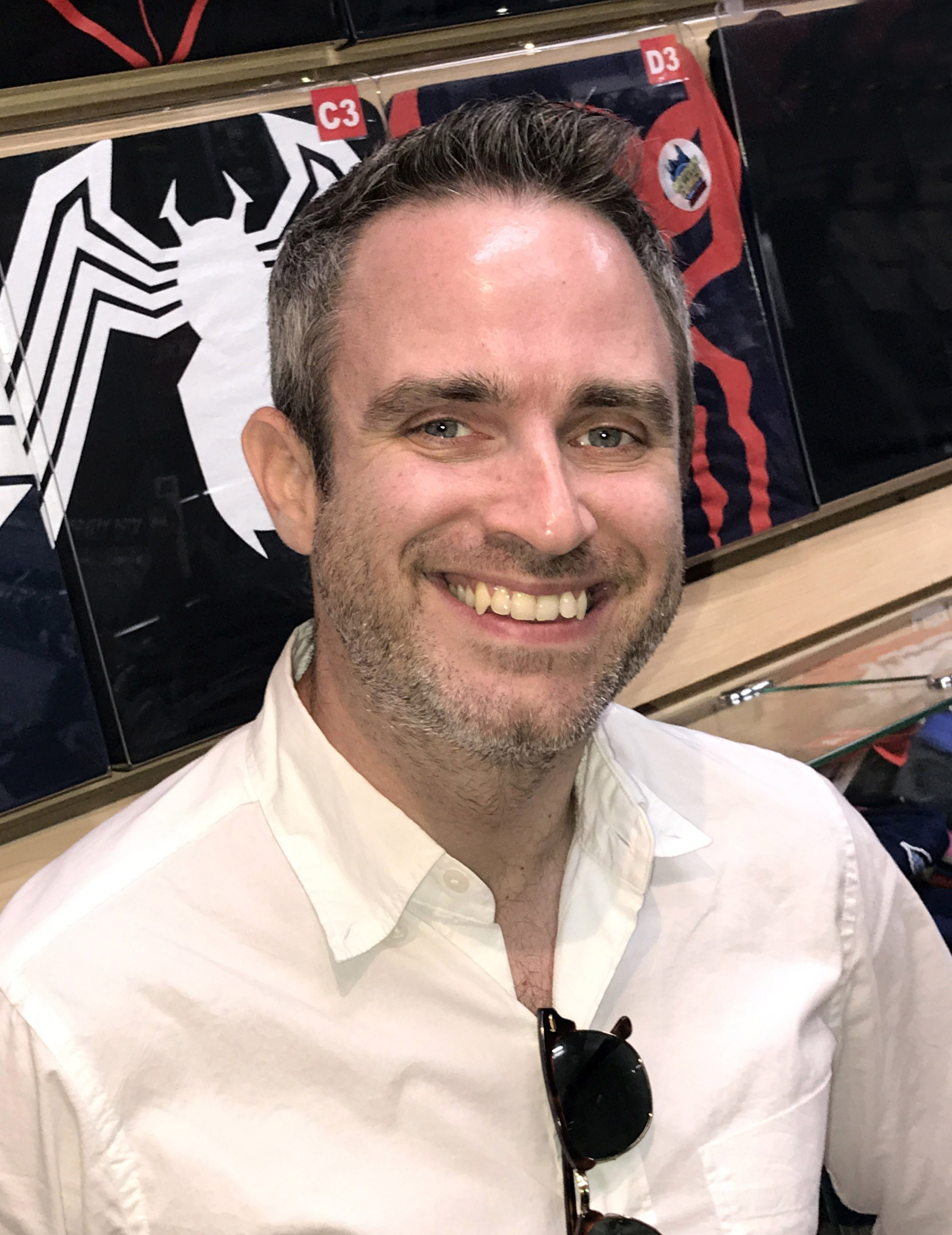
- Spencer at a signing at Midtown Comics in Manhattan
- Area: Writer
- Notable works: Morning Glories; Secret Avengers; Superior Foes of Spider-Man; The Astonishing Ant-Man; Captain America: Steve Rogers; Secret Empire; The Amazing Spider-Man

Nick Spencer is an American comic book writer and former politician best known for his Image series Morning Glories, his collaborations with artist Steve Lieber on the comedic series Superior Foes of Spider-Man and The Fix, a three-year run on Marvel's The Amazing Spider-Man, as well as the Captain America storyline that began with Captain America: Sam Wilson, continued with Captain America: Steve Rogers, and culminated in the 2017 company-wide crossover "Secret Empire".

== Career ==
While in college, Spencer wrote three pitches to Marvel soon after the launch of the Marvel Knights imprint in 1998. According to Spencer, "Joe [Quesada] didn't like the first two but the third one was a Black Cat pitch that was a Jackie Brown kind of Tarantino-esque thing. He said he liked that one but they weren't going to do anything with anybody new at the time." After another pitch was rejected, this time by Oni Press, Spencer went on to work in politics, running twice for the Cincinnati City Council as a candidate of the progressive Charter Party and working for a Democratic politician.

After Spencer moved to New York City, he successfully pitched a series to Jim Valentino at Image Comics. The first issue of Existence 2.0 was released in July 2009 under Valentino's Shadowline imprint, while its follow-up, titled Existence 3.0, launched in November. In January 2010, Newsarama named Spencer one of ten creators to watch for the coming year. Two months later, Paramount Pictures acquired the rights to Existence 2.0, to be developed through Platinum Dunes with Miles Millar and Alfred Gough as executive producers. Meanwhile, Spencer followed up on the Existence duology with three new titles launched in 2010: Forgetless, Shuddertown and his first ongoing series Morning Glories.

In September 2010, Spencer made his Big Two debut with a Jimmy Olsen serial that ran in Action Comics and featured the comic book debut of the character Chloe Sullivan from the TV series Smallville. In 2011, he wrote the modern revamp of T.H.U.N.D.E.R. Agents and was announced as the new writer of the Supergirl ongoing series, although he was taken off the title shortly thereafter. At the 2011 Emerald City Comic Con, it was announced that Spencer had signed an exclusive contract with Marvel, one that would allow him to continue writing his existing titles at both DC and Image.

Spencer's first work for Marvel was the Iron Man 2.0 ongoing series which debuted in February 2011. That same year, he wrote a short arc tying the Secret Avengers series into the company-wide crossover storyline "Fear Itself" and was one of three writers that worked on the relaunch of the Ultimate Marvel line, along with Jonathan Hickman and Brian Michael Bendis, writing Ultimate Comics: X-Men. In 2016, Spencer became the writer of the ongoing series Captain America: Steve Rogers, in which Captain America was replaced by a version of himself loyal to the villainous organization Hydra. The storyline culminated in the crossover event "Secret Empire", for which Spencer wrote the main story.

In March 2018, it was announced that Spencer would be writing a relaunch of The Amazing Spider-Man series set to debut that year, replacing long-time writer Dan Slott, as part of the Fresh Start relaunch that July. Spencer's run concluded in 2021, with issue #74.

In June 2021, it was announced that Spencer was working in an undisclosed leading capacity for Substack's new comics publishing initiative. The following month, it was reported that Spencer led a group of creators, which included Scott Snyder, Jonathan Hickman, Saladin Ahmed, Lee Knox Ostertag, James Tynion IV, that formed a deal with Substack to publish creator-owned comics stories, essays, and instructional guides on that platform.

== Bibliography ==
=== Image Comics ===
- Shadowline:
  - Existence 2.0 #1–3 and Existence 3.0 #1–4 (with Ron Salas, 2009–2010) collected as Existence 2.0/3.0 (tpb, 144 pages, 2010, ISBN 1-60706-299-2)
  - Forgetless #1–5 (with W. Scott Forbes, Jorge Coelho and Marley Zarcone, 2009–2010) collected as Forgetless (tpb, 128 pages, 2010, ISBN 1-60706-361-1)
  - Fractured Fables: "Cinderella" (with Rodin Esquejo, anthology graphic novel, hc, 160 pages, 2010, ISBN 1-60706-269-0; sc, 2012, ISBN 1-60706-496-0)
  - Shuddertown #1–4 (with Adam Geen, 2010) collected as Shuddertown (hc, 128 pages, 2010, ISBN 1-60706-943-1)
    - Issue #5 was solicited for October 2010 but never released.
  - Morning Glories (with Joe Eisma, 2010–2016) collected as:
    - For a Better Future (collects #1–6, tpb, 192 pages, 2011, ISBN 1-60706-307-7)
    - All Will Be Free (collects #7–12, tpb, 168 pages, 2011, ISBN 1-60706-407-3)
    - P. E. (collects #13–19, tpb, 240 pages, 2012, ISBN 1-60706-558-4)
    - Truants (collects #20–25, tpb, 216 pages, 2013, ISBN 1-60706-727-7)
    - Tests (collects #26–29, tpb, 136 pages, 2013, ISBN 1-60706-774-9)
    - Demerits (collects #30–34, tpb, 144 pages, 2013, ISBN 1-60706-774-9)
    - Honors (collects #35–38, tpb, 124 pages, 2014, ISBN 1-60706-943-1)
    - Rivals (collects #39–42, tpb, 120 pages, 2015, ISBN 1-63215-140-5)
    - Assembly (collects #43–46, tpb, 104 pages, 2015, ISBN 1-63215-560-5)
    - Expulsion (collects #47–50, tpb, 136 pages, 2016, ISBN 1-63215-732-2)
  - The Infinite Vacation #1–5 (with Christian Ward and Kendall Bruns, 2011–2013) collected as The Infinite Vacation (hc, 192 pages, 2013, ISBN 1-60706-721-8)
- Thief of Thieves #1–7 (co-written by Spencer and Robert Kirkman, art by Shawn Martinbrough, Skybound, 2012) collected as Thief of Thieves: I Quit (tpb, 152 pages, 2012, ISBN 1-60706-592-4)
- Bedlam (with Riley Rossmo and Ryan Browne, 2012–2014) collected as:
  - Volume 1 (collects #1–6, tpb, 184 pages, 2013, ISBN 1-60706-735-8)
  - Volume 2 (collects #7–11, tpb, 120 pages, 2014, ISBN 1-60706-846-X)
- Paradigms (with Butch Guice, unreleased ongoing series, announced for 2014)
- Cerulean (with Frazer Irving, unreleased ongoing series, announced for 2014)
- The Great Beyond (with Morgan Jeske, unreleased limited series, announced for 2014)
- The Fix (with Steve Lieber, 2016–2018) collected as:
  - Where Beagles Dare (collects #1–4, tpb, 128 pages, 2016, ISBN 1-63215-912-0)
  - Laws, Paws and Flaws (collects #5–8, tpb, 104 pages, 2017, ISBN 1-5343-0048-1)
  - Deal of Fortune (collects #9–12, tpb, 104 pages, 2018, ISBN 1-5343-0374-X)

=== Marvel Comics ===
- Iron Man 2.0 (with Kano, Carmine Di Giandomenico, Barry Kitson (#1–3), Ariel Olivetti, Jorge Lucas (#8), Neil Edwards (#11) and Mirco Pierfederici (#11–12), 2011–2012) collected as:
  - Palmer Addley is Dead (collects #1–7 and the prologue short story from Invincible Iron Man #500, tpb, 176 pages, 2011, ISBN 0-7851-4749-7)
  - Asymmetry (collects #7.1 and 8–12, tpb, 128 pages, 2012, ISBN 0-7851-4751-9)
    - Issue #9 is co-written by Spencer and Joshua Hale Fialkov; issues #10–12 are co-written by Spencer and Will Pfeifer.
- The Avengers:
  - Secret Avengers (with Scott Eaton, 2011; with Luke Ross, Butch Guice (vol. 2 #6–7, 9, 12–14) and Brian Thies (vol. 2 #7), 2013–2014) collected as:
    - Fear Itself (collects vol. 1 #12.1 and 13–15, hc, 120 pages, 2012, ISBN 0-7851-5177-X; tpb, 2012, ISBN 0-7851-5178-8)
    - Reverie (collects vol. 2 #1–5, tpb, 120 pages, 2013, ISBN 0-7851-6688-2)
      - Includes the Nick Fury short story (art by Luke Ross) from Marvel NOW! Point One (anthology one-shot, 2012)
    - Iliad (includes vol. 2 #6–9, tpb, 136 pages, 2014, ISBN 0-7851-6689-0)
    - How to MA.I.M. a Mockingbird (collects vol. 2 #12–16, tpb, 112 pages, 2014, ISBN 0-7851-8482-1)
      - Issues #12–16 of the second volume are co-written by Spencer and Ales Kot.
  - The Avengers vol. 5 #12–17 (co-written by Spencer and Jonathan Hickman, art by Mike Deodato, Jr. (#12–13) and Stefano Caselli (#14–17), 2013)
    - Collected in The Avengers by Jonathan Hickman Omnibus Volume 1 (hc, 1,192 pages, 2017, ISBN 1-302-90708-5)
    - Collected in The Avengers by Jonathan Hickman: The Complete Collection Volume 2 (tpb, 344 pages, 2019, ISBN 1-302-92530-X)
  - Avengers World: The Complete Collection (tpb, 528 pages, 2019, ISBN 1-302-91617-3) includes:
    - All-New Marvel NOW! Point One: "Short Term Fixes" (with Rags Morales, anthology one-shot, 2014)
    - Avengers World #1–16 (with Stefano Caselli, Marco Checchetto (#6, 8, 10, 12, 14–16) and Raffaele Ienco (#11 and 13), 2014–2015)
      - Issues #1–5 are co-written by Spencer and Jonathan Hickman; issues #15–16 are co-written by Spencer and Frank Barbiere.
  - Avengers: Standoff! (hc, 416 pages, 2016, ISBN 1-302-90147-8; tpb, 2017, ISBN 1-302-90885-5) includes:
    - Avengers: Standoff — Welcome to Pleasant Hill (with Mark Bagley, one-shot, 2016)
    - Avengers: Standoff — Assault on Pleasant Hill Alpha (with Jesús Saiz, one-shot, 2016)
    - Avengers: Standoff — Assault on Pleasant Hill Omega (with Daniel Acuña and Angel Unzueta, one-shot, 2016)
- Ultimate Comics:
  - Ultimate Spider-Man: Death of Spider-Man Fallout (hc, 136 pages, 2011, ISBN 0-7851-5912-6; tpb, 2012, ISBN 0-7851-5913-4) includes:
    - Ultimate Fallout (anthology):
      - "Rogue" (with Lee Garbett, in #2, 2011)
      - "Kitty Pryde" (with Eric Nguyen, in #3, 2011)
      - "Valerie Cooper" (with Clayton Crain, in #4, 2011)
      - "Quicksilver" (with Luke Ross, in #5, 2011)
      - "Kitty, Bobby and Johnny" (with Eric Nguyen, in #6, 2011)
  - Ultimate Comics: X-Men (with Paco Medina and Carlo Barberi (#6–8), 2011–2012) collected as:
    - Ultimate Comics: X-Men by Nick Spencer Volume 1 (collects #1–6, hc, 136 pages, 2012, ISBN 0-7851-4015-8; tpb, 2012, ISBN 0-7851-4102-2)
    - Ultimate Comics: X-Men by Nick Spencer Volume 2 (collects #7–12, hc, 136 pages, 2012, ISBN 0-7851-6133-3; tpb, 2013, ISBN 0-7851-6134-1)
- Spider-Island: Cloak and Dagger #1–3 (with Emma Ríos, 2011)
  - Collected in Spider-Man: Spider-Island Companion (hc, 360 pages, 2012, ISBN 0-7851-6228-3; tpb, 2012, ISBN 0-7851-6229-1)
  - Collected in Cloak and Dagger: Runaways and Reversals (tpb, 368 pages, 2018, ISBN 1-302-91058-2)
- Victor Von Doom (with Becky Cloonan, unreleased 4-issue limited series — initially announced for 2011)
  - Three issues were solicited before the series was pulled off schedule.
- Spider-Man:
  - The Superior Foes of Spider-Man (with Steve Lieber and Rich Ellis (#7, 9, 14), 2013–2015) collected as:
    - Getting the Band Back Together (collects #1–6, tpb, 136 pages, 2014, ISBN 0-7851-8494-5)
    - The Crime of the Century (includes #7–9 and 12, tpb, 112 pages, 2014, ISBN 0-7851-8495-3)
    - Game Over (collects #13–17, tpb, 136 pages, 2015, ISBN 0-7851-9170-4)
    - Omnibus (includes #1–9 and 12–17, hc, 376 pages, 2016, ISBN 0-7851-9837-7)
  - The Amazing Spider-Man vol. 5 (with Ryan Ottley, Humberto Ramos (#6–10, 17–18, 20, 22, 25, 49, 74), Steve Lieber (#7), Michele Bandini (#9–10), Chris Bachalo (#14–15, 19.HU), Alberto Albuquerque (#16), Iban Coello (#16.HU, 38–40), Ken Lashley (#18.HU), Gerardo Sandoval (#19 and 21), Cory Smith + Tyler Crook (#20.HU), Kev Walker (#26–28), Francesco Manna (#29), Patrick Gleason (#32–34, 50–52, 55, 61–62), Oscar Bazaldua (#35–36), Zé Carlos (#40, 68–69, 72–74), Kim Jacinto + Bruno Oliveira (#44), Mark Bagley (#45, 48–49, 53–54, 56–57, 60, 66, 74), Marcelo Ferreira (#46–47, 58–59, 67–69, 72–74), Federico Vincentini (#50.LR–54.LR, 63–65, 70–71), Takeshi Miyazawa (#53.LR–54.LR), Federico Sabbatini (#65, 71–72), Carlos Gómez (#67–69, 72–74) and Diogenes Neves + Ivan Fiorelli (#74); issues #50.LR–54.LR are co-written by Spencer and Matthew Rosenberg; issues #68–69 are co-written by Spencer and Ed Brisson; issue #74 is co-written by Spencer and Christos Gage, 2018–2021) collected as:
    - Back to Basics (collects #1–5 and the Free Comic Book Day 2018: The Amazing Spider-Man/Guardians of the Galaxy special, tpb, 152 pages, 2018, ISBN 1-302-91231-3)
    - Friends and Foes (collects #6–10, tpb, 120 pages, 2019, ISBN 1-302-91232-1)
    - Lifetime Achievement (collects #11–15, tpb, 112 pages, 2019, ISBN 1-302-91433-2)
    - Hunted (collects #16–23, 16.HU and 18.HU–20.HU, tpb, 112 pages, 2019, ISBN 1-302-91434-0)
    - Behind the Scenes (collects #24–28, tpb, 112 pages, 2019, ISBN 1-302-91435-9)
    - Absolute Carnage (collects #29–31, tpb, 112 pages, 2020, ISBN 1-302-91727-7)
    - 2099 (collects #32–36, tpb, 112 pages, 2020, ISBN 1-302-92022-7)
    - Threats and Menaces (collects #37–43, tpb, 160 pages, 2020, ISBN 1-302-92023-5)
    - Sins Rising (collects #44–47, tpb, 136 pages, 2020, ISBN 1-302-91727-7)
      - Includes The Amazing Spider-Man: Sins Rising Prelude one-shot (written by Spencer, art by Guillermo Sanna, 2020)
    - Green Goblin Returns (collects #48–49 and the Free Comic Book Day 2020: Spider-Man/Venom special, tpb, 160 pages, 2020, ISBN 1-302-92025-1)
      - Includes The Amazing Spider-Man: Sins of Norman Osborn one-shot (written by Spencer, art by Federico Vincentini, 2020)
    - Last Remains (collects #50–55, tpb, 160 pages, 2021, ISBN 1-302-92587-3)
    - Last Remains Companion (collects #50.LR–54.LR, tpb, 120 pages, 2021, ISBN 1-302-92779-5)
    - Shattered Web (collects #56–60, tpb, 128 pages, 2021, ISBN 1-302-92605-5)
    - King's Ransom (collects #61–65, tpb, 168 pages, 2021, ISBN 1-302-92606-3)
      - Includes Giant-Size Amazing Spider-Man: King's Ransom (written by Spencer, art by Roge Antonio, Carlos Gómez and Zé Carlos, 2021)
    - The Chameleon Conspiracy (collects #66–69, tpb, 168 pages, 2021, ISBN 1-302-92607-1)
      - Includes Giant-Size Amazing Spider-Man: The Chameleon Conspiracy (co-written by Spencer and Ed Brisson, art by Marcelo Ferreira, Carlos Gómez, Zé Carlos and Ig Guara, 2021)
    - What Cost Victory? (collects #70–74, tpb, 176 pages, 2021, ISBN 1-302-92608-X)
  - The Amazing Spider-Man: Full Circle: "Part Three" (with Mike Allred, anthology one-shot, 2019)
  - The Amazing Spider-Man: 2099 Companion (tpb, 296 pages, 2020, ISBN 1-302-92492-3) includes:
    - 2099: Alpha (with Viktor Bogdanovic, one-shot, 2020)
    - 2099: Omega (with Gerardo Sandoval, one-shot, 2020)
    - 2099: Spider-Man (with José Carlos Silva, one-shot, 2020)
  - Sinister War #1–4 (with Mark Bagley, Diogenes Neves (#2 and 4), Carlos Gómez + Zé Carlos (#2–3) and Marcelo Ferreira (#4), 2021) collected as Sinister War (tpb, 136 pages, 2021, ISBN 1-302-93107-5)
    - Issues #2–4 are co-written by Spencer and Ed Brisson.
- The Astonishing Ant-Man: The Complete Collection (tpb, 472 pages, 2018, ISBN 1-302-91132-5) collects:
  - Ant-Man #1–5 (with Ramon Rosanas, 2015) also collected as Ant-Man: Second-Chance Man (tpb, 120 pages, 2015, ISBN 0-7851-9387-1)
  - The Astonishing Ant-Man (with Ramon Rosanas, Annapaola Martello (#6) and Brent Schoonover (#8, 12–13), 2015–2016) also collected as:
    - Everybody Loves Team-Ups (collects #1–4, tpb, 144 pages, 2016, ISBN 0-7851-9948-9)
      - Includes Ant-Man Annual #1 (written by Spencer, art by Ramon Rosanas and Brent Schoonover, 2015)
      - Includes Ant-Man: Last Days (written by Spencer, art by Ramon Rosanas, one-shot, 2015)
    - Small-Time Criminal (collects #5–9, tpb, 112 pages, 2016, ISBN 0-7851-9949-7)
    - The Trial of Ant-Man (collects #10–13, tpb, 120 pages, 2017, ISBN 0-7851-9952-7)
- Captain America:
  - Captain America: Sam Wilson (with Daniel Acuña, Mike Choi (#3), Paul Renaud, Joe Bennett (#6, 23–24), Angel Unzueta, Szymon Kudranski (#16) and Sean Izaakse (#22); issue #24 is co-written by Spencer and Donny Cates, 2015–2017) collected as:
    - The Complete Collection Volume 1 (includes #1–6, tpb, 488 pages, 2020, ISBN 1-302-92325-0)
    - The Complete Collection Volume 2 (collects #7–24, tpb, 504 pages, 2021, ISBN 1-302-92297-1)
      - Includes Captain America #25 (written by Spencer, art by Jesús Saiz and Joe Bennett, 2017) as the series was renamed for its final issue.
      - Includes the Generations: Sam Wilson Captain America and Steve Rogers Captain America one-shot (written by Spencer, art by Paul Renaud, 2017)
  - Captain America: Steve Rogers (with Jesús Saiz, Javier Pina, Miguel Sepulveda (#4), Andres Guinaldo, Ro Stein (#13), Yıldıray Çınar + Jon Malin (#16) and Ramon Bachs (#17); issues #18–19 are co-written by Spencer and Donny Cates, 2016–2017) collected as:
    - Captain America: Steve Rogers — Hail Hydra (collects #1–6 and the Free Comic Book Day 2016: Captain America special, tpb, 168 pages, 2016, ISBN 1-302-90112-5)
    - Captain America: Steve Rogers — The Trial of Maria Hill (collects #7–11, tpb, 120 pages, 2017, ISBN 1-302-90113-3)
    - Captain America: Steve Rogers — Empire Building (collects #12–16, tpb, 152 pages, 2017, ISBN 1-302-90616-X)
      - Includes the Civil War II: The Oath one-shot (written by Spencer, art by Rod Reis, Phil Noto, Raffaele Ienco and Szymon Kudranski, 2017)
    - Captain America: Secret Empire (includes #17–19, tpb, 136 pages, 2017, ISBN 1-302-90849-9)
- Secret Empire (hc, 432 pages, 2017, ISBN 0-7851-9452-5; tpb, 2017, ISBN 0-7851-9453-3) collects:
  - Free Comic Book Day 2017: Secret Empire (with Andrea Sorrentino, one-shot, 2017)
  - Secret Empire #0–10 (with Rod Reis, Daniel Acuña (#0 and 8), Steven McNiven (#1 and 10), Andrea Sorrentino (#2–3, 5, 7), Joshua Cassara (#4–7), Leinil Francis Yu (#4, 6, 9), Sean Izaakse (#8) and Joe Bennett (#9), 2017)
  - Secret Empire Omega (with Andrea Sorrentino and Joe Bennett, one-shot, 2017)
- Not Brand Echh #14: "Secret Empire (Abridged)" (with Scott Koblish, anthology, 2017) collected in Not Brand Echh: The Complete Collection (tpb, 480 pages, 2019, ISBN 1-302-91882-6)
- Doctor Strange: Damnation #1–4 (co-written by Spencer and Donny Cates, art by Rod Reis (#1 and 4) and Szymon Kudranski, 2018)
  - Collected in Doctor Strange: Damnation — The Complete Collection (tpb, 336 pages, 2018, ISBN 1-302-91260-7)
  - Collected in Doctor Strange by Donny Cates (hc, 360 pages, 2019, ISBN 1-302-91529-0)
- Marvel Comics #1001: "Uatu Know" (with Steve Lieber, anthology, 2019) collected in Marvel Comics 1000 (hc, 144 pages, 2020, ISBN 1-302-92137-1)

=== Other publishers ===
- DC Comics:
  - Action Comics #893–896: "Jimmy Olsen's Big Week" (with R. B. Silva, co-feature, 2010–2011)
    - Only four out of seven planned installments were published as a result of DC's decision to discontinue back-up features in their ongoing titles.
    - The last three installments (with art by R. B. Silva and Amilcar Pinna), along with the first four, were published as Jimmy Olsen (one-shot, 2011)
  - Supergirl vol. 5 #60: "Good-Looking Corpse" (co-written by Spencer and James Peaty, art by Bernard Chang, 2011)
    - Despite being announced as the regular series writer, Spencer ended up writing only two thirds of his inaugural issue.
    - In 2013, Spencer revealed the reasons behind his departure from the series as well as some of his plans for story direction.
  - T.H.U.N.D.E.R. Agents:
    - T.H.U.N.D.E.R. Agents vol. 3 #1–10 (with CAFU and Mike Grell (#7–10), 2011) collected as T.H.U.N.D.E.R. Agents Volume 1 (tpb, 240 pages, 2011, ISBN 1-4012-3254-X)
      - Most of the issues featured segments created by guest artists: ChrisCross (#2), Howard Chaykin (#3), George Pérez (#4), Ryan Sook (#5), Dan Panosian (#8–9) and Dan McDaid (#10).
    - T.H.U.N.D.E.R. Agents vol. 4 #1–6 (with Wes Craig, 2012)
      - As with the previous volume, most of the issues featured segments created by guest artists: Jerry Ordway (#2), Walt Simonson (#3), Sam Kieth (#4), Mike Choi (#5) and CAFU (#6).
      - A collected edition was solicited for a 2012 release but subsequently cancelled: T.H.U.N.D.E.R. Agents Volume 2 (tpb, 160 pages, ISBN 1-4012-3492-5)
  - Superman: Red and Blue #3: "Something to Hold On to" (with Christian Ward, anthology, 2021) collected in Superman: Red and Blue (hc, 272 pages, 2021, ISBN 1-77951-280-5; tpb, 2022, ISBN 1-77951-747-5)
- Archie (with Marguerite Sauvage (#700–702), Sandy Jarell (#702–705, 708–709), Jenn St-Onge (#706–707), Archie Comics, 2019–2020) collected as:
  - Archie by Nick Spencer Volume 1 (collects #700–704, tpb, 144 pages, 2019, ISBN 1-68255-783-9)
  - Archie by Nick Spencer Volume 2: Archie and Sabrina (collects #705–709, tpb, 144 pages, 2020, ISBN 1-64576-979-8)
    - Issues #706–709 are co-written by Spencer and Mariko Tamaki.

Preceded by Ed Brubaker	Secret Avengers writer 2011	Succeeded by Warren Ellis
Preceded by Jeph Loeb (Ultimate Comics: X)	Ultimate Comics: X-Men writer 2011–2012	Succeeded by Brian Wood
Preceded by Rick Remender	Secret Avengers writer 2013–2014	Succeeded by Ales Kot
Preceded by Rick Remender	Captain America writer 2015–2017	Succeeded by Mark Waid
Preceded by Dan Slott	The Amazing Spider-Man writer 2018–2021	Succeeded by Zeb Wells
