= Battle Scars (comic book) =

Shattered Heroes: Battle Scars
- Cover to issue five.

Publication information
- Publisher: Marvel Comics
- Schedule: Monthly
- Format: Limited series
- Publication date: 2011
- No. of issues: 6
- Main character(s): Nick Fury Jr; Nick Fury

Creative team
- Written by: Cullen Bunn; Matt Fraction; Christopher Yost
- Artist(s): Scot Eaton; Andrew 'Drew' Hennessy
- Penciller: Scot Eaton
- Inker: Andrew 'Drew' Hennessy
- Letterer: Joe Sabino
- Colorist(s): Antonio Fabela; Matthew 'Matt' Hollingsworth; Paul Mounts
- Editor(s): Axel Alonso; Alejandro Arbona; Tom Brevoort; John Denning; Jennifer Grünwald; Joe Quesada

Shattered Heroes: Battle Scars is a six-issue comic book miniseries published by Marvel Comics in 2011 and 2012. The series was created to introduce Nick Fury Jr, the black son of the original Nick Fury to correspond with the version played in the films by Samuel L. Jackson. The series also introduced the character of Phil Coulson from the Marvel Cinematic Universe into the comics.

== Publication history ==
The series was published from 2011 to 2012.

== Plot ==
While serving in the Middle East, Marcus Johnson receives word that his mother Nia Jones has been killed back in the United States. He returns home and is attacked by the Russian hitmen who killed her, and by Taskmaster, but is saved by Captain America. S.H.I.E.L.D. agents arrive and take him to a S.H.I.E.L.D. facility for medical treatment. After failing to get answers as to why he was targeted and his mother killed, Johnson comes to feel he is being held there against his will and escapes.

While searching for Taskmaster, Johnson is attacked by Deadpool, who is also after Johnson. As they fight, Taskmaster arrives and dispatches Deadpool, but Johnson himself defeats Taskmaster. Johnson is felled, however, by the Serpent Squad. When Deadpool again intervenes, Johnson escapes with Taskmaster as his prisoner, and later interrogates him. Before he can obtain any information, a masked man stuns Taskmaster, drains Johnson's energy for a moment, and escapes. Johnson catches up with the man, who is revealed to be Johnson's father, Nick Fury.

While arguing and eventually coming to blows over the revelation, Fury and Johnson are captured by mercenaries who bring them to Orion (who was a former member of the organization Leviathan). Orion has Johnson's left eye cut out and confirms that Johnson has the Infinity Formula in his DNA. Fury escapes his restraints and gives Johnson enough time to escape, but Fury is captured and his blood transfused to Orion, so that Orion's youth can be restored. The transfusion drains Fury of the remaining Infinity Formula in his system, and he is then tortured and mind-probed by Orion's telepath, who acquires all of Fury's S.H.I.E.L.D. secrets and fail-safes. Johnson saves Fury with the help of S.H.I.E.L.D. agent Phil Coulson and later kills Orion. After convalescing, Johnson is given the Super Soldier uniform that Steve Rogers once wore. As a new agent of S.H.I.E.L.D., Johnson is also informed that his birth name is "Nicholas Fury Jr.".

== Reception ==
The series holds an average rating of 7.0 by 25 professional critics on the review aggregation website Comic Book Roundup.

Joey Esposito of IGN wrote that while he enjoyed the series as a whole, he still added that "its bizarre and frankly lengthy approach to establish parallels with the Marvel movie universe is painfully uninspired and disappointing. While there are nuggets of potential laced in this series' outcome, I'm not sure I have faith in the current state of superhero comics to deliver on it". He also gave credit to the artwork.

Jamil Scalese of Comics Bulletin thought that many fans of Marvel Comics expressed a generally negative reaction to the series. He explained that while the purpose of it is painfully apparent, the story underneath is not so bad that it does not deserve recognition and that the writers Yost and Eaton pull together a solid tale about a regular guy getting caught up in a world he barely understands and adapting.

== Prints ==
=== Issues ===
No.	Title	Cover date	Comic Book Roundup rating	Estimated sales (first month)
#1	"Shattered Heroes: Part 1"	January 2012	6.3 by five professional critics.	32,222, ranked 67th in North America
#2	"Shattered Heroes: Part 2"	February 2012	6.6 by three professional critics.	21,702, ranked 93rd in North America
#3	"Shattered Heroes: Part 3"	March 2012	7.5 by three professional critics.	18,102, ranked 104th in North America
#4	"Shattered Heroes: Part 4"	April 2012	7.1 by four professional critics.	16,753, ranked 120th in North America
#5	"Shattered Heroes: Part 5"	May 2012	8.5 by two professional critics.	15,481, ranked 119th in North America
#6	"Shattered Heroes: Part 6"	June 2012	6.2 by eight professional critics.	15,011, ranked 124th in North America

=== Collected editions ===
Title [Tagline]	Format	Material collected	Pages	Publication date	ISBN	Estimated sales (North America) [Trades]	Rated
Shattered Heroes: Battle Scars	Trade paperback	Battle Scars #1–6	136	June 2012	ISBN 0785163409; ISBN 978-0785163404		12+

== See also ==
- 2011 in comics
- 2012 in comics
