= Scot Eaton =

American comic book artist

Scot Eaton is a comic book artist, best known for his work on Friendly Neighborhood Spider-Man, Thor, X-Men: Endangered Species, and X-Men: Messiah Complex.

== Career ==
In the early 1990s Eaton started penciling Doctor Fate and Swamp Thing for DC Comics. He went on to draw Silver Surfer and Thor for Marvel Comics. He later went to work for CrossGen after relocating to Florida. Eaton eventually quit Crossgen and returned to Vermont.

== Bibliography ==
=== DC ===
- Action Comics vol. 2 #52 (2016)
- The Adventures of Superman #545 (1997)
- Animal Man #56 (1993)
- Aquaman vol. 8 #2, 7–9, 13, 17–18, 21, 23-24 (2016-2017)
- Azrael #8 (along with Barry Kitson) (1995)
- Batman and Robin Eternal #3-5, 8, 17–18, 26 (2015-2016)
- Creature Commandos, miniseries, #1-8 (2000)
- Deathstroke vol. 2 #19 (2013)
- Detective Comics #980 (2018)
- Detective Comics vol. 2 #21, 23.4, 50, Annual #2 (2013-2016)
- Doctor Fate vol. 2 #32-37 (1991–92)
- Doom Patrol, vol. 2, #70 (1993)
- Forever Evil: Arkham War #1-6 (2013-2014)
- Green Lantern, vol. 3, #105 (along with Jeff Johnson) (1998)
- Green Lantern: The New Corps, miniseries, #1-2 (1999)
- Hawkman, vol. 4, #19 (2003)
- JLA Superpower (1999)
- Justice League vol. 3 #13 (2017)
- Lobo vol. 2 #29 (1996)
- Nightwing vol. 4 #32 (2018)
- R.E.B.E.L.S. '95 #7 (1995)
- Scarab (1993–94)
- Secret Files & Origins Guide to the DC Universe (2000)
- Shade, the Changing Man, vol. 2, #39 (along with Chris Bachalo) (1993)
- Showcase '95 #4, 7–8, 10 (1995–96)
- Suicide Squad vol. 5 #32 (2018)
- Suicide Squad: Black Files (2019)
- Superman, vol. 2, #141 (1999)
- Superman Forever (among other artists) (1998)
- Superman: Save the Planet (1998)
- Superman: The Man of Steel #69-74, 83, 86 (1997–98)
- Swamp Thing, vol. 2, #118-135, 138 (1992–93)
- Teen Titans vol. 6 #17-19 (2018)
- Titans: Burning Rage (2019-2020)
- The New 52: Futures End, #8 (2014)
- Wonder Woman vol. 5 #79 (2019)

=== Marvel ===
- Black Panther, vol. 4, #10-19 (2006)
- Captain America, vol. 3, Annual 2000
- Captain America, vol. 4, #29-32 (2004)
- Cosmic Powers, miniseries, #6 (1994)
- Cosmic Powers Unlimited, miniseries, #4-5 (1996)
- Doomwar, miniseries, #1-6 (2010)
- Fantastic Four: House of M, miniseries, #1-3 (2005)
- Friendly Neighborhood Spider-Man #14-16 (2007)
- Guardians of the Galaxy #54 (1994)
- Iron Man, vol. 3, #89 (2004)
- Iron Man/Thor, miniseries, #1-4 (2011)
- New Excalibur (Excalibur, vol. 2) #16-22 (2007)
- New X-Men #40-41 (2007)
- Secret Avengers #12.1, 13-14 (2011)
- Silver Sable and the Will Pack #30, 32 (1994–95)
- Silver Surfer, vol. 2, #95, 117-122 (full art); Annual #7 (along with Tom Grindberg) (1994–96)
- Soldier X #11-12 (2003)
- Starmasters, miniseries, #1-3 (1995–96)
- Thor, vol. 2, #68-73, 75-79 (2003–04)
- Werewolf by Night Vol. 3 (2020)
- Wolverine: Origins #37-38 (2009)
- Wolverine, vol. 7, #11-13 (2021)
- X-Factor, vol. 2, #23, 25-27 (2007–08)
- X-Men, vol. 2, (then, X-Men: Legacy) #200-202, 204, 208–215, 217–218, 220-224 (2007); Annual 2000
- X-Men: Original Sin (along with Mike Deodato) (2008)
- Fury, vol. 3, (2023)

=== Other publishers ===
- Bloodshot #9 (Acclaim, 1998)
- Dreadstar #62-64 (First, 1991)
- Edge #2-5 (CrossGen, 2002)
- Eternal Warrior #45-46 (along with Dale Eaglesham) (Acclaim, 1992)
- Killer Instinct Special #2 (Acclaim, 1996)
- Sigil #10-14, 16–19, 21–26, 29–33, 35 (CrossGen, 2001–03)
