= Generations (Marvel Comics) =

2017 anthology comic book series

- Promotional image of Generations. Art by Alex Ross.

Publication information
- Publisher: Marvel Comics
- Format: Limited series
- Genre: Superhero
- Publication date: August – September 2017
- No. of issues: 10

Creative team
- Written by: Various
- Artist: Various

Collected editions
- Generations: ISBN 978-1-302-90847-8

Generations is a limited ten-issue anthology comic book series published by Marvel Comics that ran from August to September 2017. Each issue, written and drawn by different creative teams, features a different team-up of a classic Marvel superhero with their Modern Age counterpart. The series, first teased in February 2017 with artwork by Alex Ross, immediately follows the events of the "Secret Empire" storyline which concludes with a number of modern heroes being sent through time on a journey of self-discovery. According to Marvel editor-in-chief Axel Alonso, the goal of the series was to examine who these heroes are and suggest where they might be heading in the future.

Despite receiving generally favorable reviews from critics, Generations reported underwhelming sales figures over its two-month course. The events of the series built the foundation of Marvel's company-wide "Marvel Legacy" relaunch of comic books, which saw the return of several classic superheroes in more prominent positions.

The 2023 Marvel Cinematic Universe film The Marvels was so-named after the eighth issue of Generations, The Marvels.

== Publication history ==
In February 2017, Marvel Comics released an image teasing the debut of Generations, featuring artwork by Alex Ross which depicted a line-up of classic Marvel superheroes with their Modern Age counterparts. The following month, the first details of the series were revealed via the description of the collected hardcover edition listed on Amazon.com. The announcement of the series came following criticism from a contingent of fans who believed that Marvel's growing diversified cast of characters came at the expense of some its long-standing heroes.

The series is a ten issue anthology, featuring a team-up of different incarnations of ten different superheroes, that ran from August to September 2017. Despite the fact that at the time of publication some of the characters listed in the pairings were either dead or incapacitated, Marvel Editor-in-Chief Axel Alonso insisted that the series is not self-contained and does not take place in an alternate timeline explaining, "These stories do happen, they really count. They really matter. This isn't some alternate reality story... You don't take these characters off the board with the intention to keep them off the board forever. One of the tropes of our medium is characters get a second wind. They die and come back. That's part of the beauty of what we do."

Alonso stated that the ten pairings should "illuminate who they are and indicate where they will be moving in the future." For instance, Brian Michael Bendis, writer of the Iron Man and Spider-Man issues, said Tony Stark could have a lasting influence on Riri Williams because "[she] is at the most impressionable stage of her life," while Peter Parker and Miles Morales, despite being from different backgrounds, have a "spiritual connection" that allowed him to examine the Spider-Man mantra of "with great power, must come great responsibility" from different perspectives. G. Willow Wilson writer of the Ms. Marvel issue, said Carol Danvers and Kamala Khan have a mentor–student relationship, but "at its heart, Ms. Marvel is about growing up, and a big part of growing up is discovering that your idols have feet of clay – and forgiving them for their flaws as you gain an adult understanding of your own." Tom Taylor writer of Wolverine suggested that Laura's experience with Logan could help her move beyond her violent past. In August 2025, Jordan D. White revealed that he had pitched an eleventh issue of the series, Generations: The Gwens, where Gwen Poole would have been transported back in time to the events of "Sins Past" to prevent Norman Osborn from sleeping with Gwen Stacy (prior to the storyline being retconned in Sinister War), implying Poole would have done so by ending up sleeping with Osborn herself instead and becoming Gabriel's and Sarah's mother retroactively.

== Issues ==
At the conclusion of the "Secret Empire" storyline, Kobik — the sentient Cosmic Cube — sends a number of heroes on a brief journey of self-discovery through a time portal.

Title	Writer	Artist	Team up	Release date
Generations: The Strongest	Greg Pak	Matteo Buffagni	Bruce Banner and Amadeus Cho	August 2, 2017
Amadeus Cho's Hulk is transported back in time and encounters Bruce Banner's Hulk fighting soldiers under the command of General Thunderbolt Ross. After helping Banner destroy a number of unmanned drones, Cho fights Banner to keep him from harming the soldiers. After both Hulks get away and regress back to normal, Cho tries to convince Banner that they are heroes. However, after witnessing Cho nearly lose control in a fight against a sea monster, Banner tells Cho that they are in fact prison guards.
Generations: The Phoenix	Cullen Bunn	RB Silva	Jean Grey (young and older)	August 9, 2017
The teenage time-displaced Jean Grey is transported back in time and encounters her adult self. There, young Grey questions older Grey about the Phoenix Force, which has been hunting her. In response, the older Phoenix-empowered Grey takes them to a planet that is under attack from Galactus. After the duo defeats Galactus, the older Grey tells young Grey that the Phoenix is the protector of life. However, as young Grey is about to respond that the Phoenix is responsible for countless deaths — including her own — Uatu the Watcher appears and warns young Grey that this course of action may cause an irreversible butterfly effect. Young Grey chooses not to reply and is transported back to the future.
Generations: The Best	Tom Taylor	Ramon Rosanas	Logan and Laura Kinney	August 16, 2017
Laura is transported back in time and helps Logan fend off a horde of The Hand's undead ninjas. When the fight is over, Laura and Logan track the ninjas to an airport and discover that Sabretooth hired The Hand to kidnap Logan's foster daughter Amiko Kobayashi as part of an elaborate plan to brainwash and train her to one day kill Logan. After they defeat Sabretooth, Laura suggests to Logan that he allow himself some happiness by spending time with Amiko and is then transported back to the future.
Generations: The Thunder	Jason Aaron	Mahmud Asrar	Odinson and Jane Foster	August 23, 2017
In the past, a young Odinson is called to ancient Egypt by the prayers of Vikings, who have fared into the Nile River and encountered Apocalypse. At the same time, Jane Foster's Thor appears and joins the fight. During the battle, Foster is amazed by how Odinson inspires the Vikings and how they in turn inspire him. When the fight is over, Foster tells Odinson that his love for humanity is what will one day make him worthy to lift Mjolnir before being transported back to the future. Meanwhile, Odin reminisces with the Phoenix Force about their past love affair.
Generations: The Archers	Kelly Thompson	Stefano Raffaele	Clint Barton and Kate Bishop	August 30, 2017
Kate Bishop finds herself in the past on a mysterious island with the world's best marksmen and encounters Clint Barton. After a rocky introduction, Barton explains that he was taken to the island against his will as part of a deadly competition. Barton and Bishop discover that the mastermind behind the competition is Barton's former mentor Swordsman, who was testing Barton's skills. After defeating Swordsman, Bishop realizes that despite Barton's flaws that she is lucky to have Barton as a mentor and is transported back to the future.
Generations: The Iron	Brian Michael Bendis	Marco Rudy	Tony Stark and Riri Williams	September 6, 2017
Riri Williams is transported to a possible future and encounters the children of the Avengers, who take her to see Tony Stark. Stark, now the 126-year-old Sorcerer Supreme, tells Williams that his ultimate goal of world peace has been achieved and that she played a role in creating it. When Williams returns to the past, she immediately goes to her lab to continue inventing.
Generations: The Bravest	Margaret Stohl	Brent Schoonover	Mar-Vell and Carol Danvers	September 13, 2017
Carol Danvers is transported back in time to Mydon, a planet in the Negative Zone that is under attack by Annihilus. Danvers is soon overwhelmed by Annihilus' soldiers but is rescued by Mar-Vell. Danvers returns the favor and saves Mar-Vell while attempting to free a Mydonian civilian aboard Annihilus' mothership. After they defeat Annihilus, Danvers admits to Mar-Vell that despite being loners, they make a good team and is transported back to the future.
Generations: The Marvels	G. Willow Wilson	Paolo Villanelli	Carol Danvers and Kamala Khan	September 20, 2017
Kamala Khan is transported to the past and is mistaken for an intern working at a women's interest magazine, edited by Carol Danvers. Khan arrives just as Barbara Nelson enters negotiations to purchase the publication. Danvers and Khan soon discover that Nelson is actually a Shi'ar exile called Nightscream. After they defeat Nightscream, Khan comes to the realization that although she and Danvers have different methods, their mission is the same. Inspired by her realization, Khan writes a well-received article for the magazine before being transported back to the future.
Generations: The Spiders	Brian Michael Bendis	Ramon Perez	Peter Parker and Miles Morales	September 27, 2017
Miles Morales travels back in time and runs into a young Peter Parker at his university. That evening, Morales goes to Parker's home and finds a distraught Parker. Parker tells Morales how he just survived a near death experience in which Doctor Octopus collapsed a building on top of him while he was searching for a cure for Aunt May's cancer. As they talk, Parker receives a phone call from May's doctor and is relieved to find out that May will be okay. At the same time, Morales learns of the pain and personal sacrifice it takes to be Spider-Man.
Generations: The Americas	Nick Spencer	Paul Renaud	Steve Rogers and Sam Wilson	September 27, 2017
Sam Wilson travels back in time to World War II-era New York City. Wilson, under the name Paul Jefferies, enlists in the military and encounters Steve Rogers on the battlefield. There, Jefferies encourages the newly recruited Rogers to be the symbol that he is meant to be. At the end of the war, Rogers is frozen in suspended animation while Jefferies starts a family, is ordained a minister, and many years later becomes involved in the Civil Rights Movement. After awaking from his hibernation, Rogers reconnects with Jefferies and seeks Jefferies' council from time to time. When Jefferies dies from old age, Wilson awakes in his present body and after meeting with the other heroes who traveled through the time portal returns Captain America's shield to Rogers.

== Reception ==
=== Critical response ===
Aggregate scores
Comic Book Roundup
Issue	Rating	Reviews
The Strongest	6.9/10	20
The Phoenix	7.8/10	18
The Best	8.7/10	13
The Thunder	7.9/10	11
The Archers	8.2/10	12
The Iron	5.9/10	8
The Bravest	6.7/10	7
The Marvels	7.9/10	9
The Spiders	7.5/10	7
The Americas	7.9/10	6

According to the review aggregator website Comic Book Roundup, Generations: The Strongest received an average score of 6.9/10 based on 20 reviews from critics. Jesse Schedeen of IGN gave it an 8.2 out of 10 saying, "Generations isn't shaping up to be a particularly groundbreaking series for Marvel. With little background for the premise of this crossover or its ties to Secret Empire and Marvel Legacy, [Generations: The Strongest] simply plays out as a fun, character-driven team-up between two heroes." David Pepose of Newsarama gave it a 3 out of 10 and said, "[This book] isn't a great first impression for Marvel's latest event. There's something to be said for nostalgia, and giving readers a glimpse at beloved characters who might have been temporarily pushed off the stage, and to that end, Pak makes a solid attempt - but unless you're a diehard Hulk fan, this one-shot will likely prove a disappointment."

Generations: The Phoenix received an average score of 7.8/10 based on 18 reviews from critics on Comic Book Roundup. Blair Marnell of IGN gave it an 8.3 writing, "[Generations: The Phoenix] feels like it should have been an issue or two from the actual Jean Grey ongoing series. Its connections to the overall Generations event are negligible, but it is a very big story for Jean Grey." Justin Partridge of Newsarama gave it a 5 and wrote, "The life of Jean Grey is a complex one, and [Generations: The Phoenix] #1 doesn't do much to make it simpler. But what it does do is attempt to give Jean a bit more control over her tumultuous past and future."

Generations: The Best received an average score of 8.7/10 based on 13 reviews from critics on Comic Book Roundup. Schedeen gave it an 8.1 and said, "It's clear by now that each Generations one-shot is going to follow a very specific formula... But it's one that works well in this Wolverine crossover. This issue makes the most of the Wolverine/X-23 dynamic and celebrates the legacy of a fallen X-Man." Kat Calamia of Newsarama gave it a 9 writing, "[Generations: The Best] #1 keeps the Generations one-shots feeling fresh with a new perspective. If you are a Wolverine fan, this is a must-read issue that delivers an emotional, character-driven story that won't leave a dry eye in the house."

Generations: The Thunder received an average score of 7.9/10 based on 11 reviews from critics on Comic Book Roundup. Schedeen gave it a 5.0 and called it "a weird mashup of different plots, none of them terribly interesting, that isn't saved by its gorgeous pin-up worthy art, or weird story elements stuck at the end." Calamia gave it a 5 writing, "[Generations: The Thunder] #1 lays the ground work for future storylines including Marvel Legacy #1, but misses the heart previous Generations issues delivered on."

Generations: The Archers received an average score of 8.2/10 based on 12 reviews from critics on Comic Book Roundup. Schedeen gave it an 8.0 and said, "It's unclear exactly how much the events of this issue will impact the ongoing Hawkeye series, but it proves there's still plenty of potential left to mine in the Kate/Clint dynamic." Calamia gave it an 8 writing, "[Generations: The Archers] #1 is a fun issue that reestablishes Kate's relationship with her mentor, and reminds us why these two characters work so well together."

Generations: The Iron received an average score of 5.9/10 based on 8 reviews from critics on Comic Book Roundup. Schedeen gave it a 7.2 and said, "I wish there were more consistency as the book shifts from one artist to the next, but Bendis and his artists paint a particularly memorable and hopeful vision of Marvel's future." Calamia gave it a 4 writing, "[Generations: The Iron] has a few nice goodies with the appearances of The Next Avengers and Sorcerer Supreme Tony Stark, but this still isn't enough for the book's $4.99 price tag."

Generations: The Bravest received an average score of 6.7/10 based on 7 reviews from critics on Comic Book Roundup. Marnell gave it a 6.5 and said, "This was one of the Generations one-shots that I had been looking forward to the most, since I'm fans of both versions of Captain Marvel. But Margaret Stohl's story really only delivers one of the title characters."

Generations: The Marvels received an average score of 7.9/10 based on 9 reviews from critics on Comic Book Roundup. Tara Giovannini of IGN gave it an 8.9 and said, "All in all, this was a freaking fun comic in a universe that has seemed of late to be nothing but dour. I can't wait to see how -- or, perhaps it's better to say if -- this comic affects Kamala and Carol's relationship in the future. Even if it doesn't, it was a nice dream. This is the type of comic that reminds you why you love them." Pierce Lydon of Newsarama gave it a 7 writing, "A story like this one, while light and seemingly inconsequential, could definitely affect the relationship that Carol and Kamala have moving forward and this lays the groundwork for some of that. It's something that honors the past while still looking to the future. Wilson, Villanelli, and Herring’s work is the foundation for a new era of Ms. Marvel stories."

Generations: The Spiders received an average score of 7.5/10 based on 7 reviews from critics on Comic Book Roundup. Schedeen gave it a 7.1 and said, "[Generations: The Spiders] ranks among the more disappointing chapters of the series, as it fails to add much to the Peter/Miles dynamic even with the shift in time period. As with Spider-Men II, this story is at its best when Peter is absent from the picture entirely. But for anyone who fell in love with Ramon Perez's art on 'Amazing Spider-Man: Learning to Crawl', this issue is a must-read." Pepose gave it an 8 writing, "The decompression of Bendis's pacing is somewhat apparent - there isn't a ton of story that goes on here, but instead, this book feels more impressionistic, where Bendis uses every inch of page space to create mood rather than plot progression. But thankfully, he's teamed up with an artist who is so talented that he's able to turn this painterly script into a work of art, making [Generations: The Spiders] definitely a book to watch."

Generations: The Americas received an average score of 7.9/10 based on 6 reviews from critics on Comic Book Roundup. Schedeen gave it an 8.5 and said, "[Generations: The Americas] is essential reading for anyone who's been following Nick Spencer's Captain America saga... This issue reads like the proper finale to that long run, offering the closure to Sam Wilson's tenure as Cap that Secret Empire didn't. It doesn't take full advantage of the time travel premise, but it works as well as could be hoped given the limited space available." Partridge gave it a 3 writing, "[Generations: The Americas] won't be for everybody. Hell, it may not be for anybody, but at least now Sam and Steve can dust off their old costumes and see what the future holds for them beyond the Vanishing Points, Secret Empires, and Hydra-Steves of the world."

=== Sales ===
Estimated number of copies sold to direct markets in the debut month of each issue's release.
Issue	Copies
The Strongest	61,311
The Phoenix	55,972
The Best	85,688
The Thunder	76,400
The Archers	45,069
The Iron	51,136
The Bravest	39,555
The Marvels	41,709
The Spiders	59,033
The Americas	50,413

According to Todd Allen of ComicsBeat, initial sales of Generations underperformed with Diamond Comic Distributors reporting less than expected sales figures. The series debuted in August 2017 with The Best coming in 5th place during the month, selling an estimated 85,688 copies, followed by The Thunder in 8th place with 76,400 estimated copies sold, The Strongest in 13th place with 61,311 estimated copies sold, The Phoenix in 16th place with 55,972 estimated copies sold, and The Archers in 28th place with 45,069 estimated copies sold. The series continued into September with The Spiders taking 16th place, selling an estimated 59,033 copies, followed by The Iron in 28th place with 51,136 estimated copies sold, The Americas in 31st place with 50,413 estimated copies sold, The Marvels in 43rd place with 41,709 estimated copies sold, and The Bravest in 51st place with 39,555 estimated copies sold.

== In other media ==
The 2023 Marvel Cinematic Universe film The Marvels was so-named after the eighth issue of Generations, also following Carol Danvers / Captain Marvel (Brie Larson) and Kamala Khan / Ms. Marvel (Iman Vellani) as the superheroes team up.
