= Character Assassination =

- Publisher: Marvel Comics
- Publication date: February – March 2009
- Genre: Superhero
- Title(s): The Amazing Spider-Man #584-#588
- Main character(s): Spider-Man; Vin Gonzales; Menace; Harry Osborn

Creative team
- Writer: Marc Guggenheim
- Penciller: John Romita, Jr.

"Character Assassination" is a four-issue Spider-Man story arc written by Marc Guggenheim with art by John Romita, Jr. and published by Marvel Comics. The arc appears in The Amazing Spider-Man #584-#588. An interlude, "The Spartacus Gambit" was featured in Amazing Spider-Man Extra #1 (June 2008) and later re-released for free online via Marvel Digital Comics Unlimited alongside the release of The Amazing Spider-Man #587 in February 2009.

== Plot summary ==
The race for mayor is hot with Bill Hollister close in the polls to Randall Crowne. The Spider-Tracer murders continue with Shocker and Boomerang walking in on another corpse. Spider-Man is chased by police and is shot in the right arm. Spider-Man hallucinates a fight with Menace in which he unmasks to reveal the face of Harry Osborn. On top of the Statue of Liberty, Harry proposes to Lily, who is not sure what to say.

Meanwhile, Carlie Cooper's lab reverse engineers the Spider-Tracers to track the source. Carlie arrives in Vin and Peter's apartment finding a bag of Spider-Tracers under Vin's bed. Horrified, she demands an explanation from Vin and his partner Cop hints that the entire NYPD is involved with the murders.

Spider-Man attempts to stop Menace from attacking the Hollister Campaign supporters but Menace defeats the wounded Spider-Man leaving him to be captured by the police. Menace retreats to Harry Osborn's apartment "unmasking" to reveal the face of Lily Hollister. Harry walks in and looks in horror.

Lily explains that she discovered notes about the Goblin Serum and hideout through concerns that Harry returned to drugs. A new type of Goblin Serum made contact with Lily's skin mutating her into Menace. She states that she attacked the Hollister campaign to make others sympathize with Bill Hollister and help him become elected. Lily also says that she accepts Harry's marriage proposal and leaves Harry who is flabbergasted by this turn of events.

On election day Harry picks up a vial of the Goblin Serum and picks up a Goblin Gun behind the original Glider.

Spider-Man is arrested by the police for the spider tracer murders and held at Ryker's Island. Matt Murdock arrives as his attorney and files motions to prevent the NYPD or the courts from unmasking him. At the preliminary hearings Iron Fist appears dressed as Spider-Man to create doubt that the Peter is the only Spider-Man or the killer. Black Cat and Murdock smuggle Peter a web-shooter.

Carlie confronts Vin and he and his partner reveal that many NYPD cops from their precinct are planting the tracers on dead bodies to frame Spider-Man in a smear campaign to turn public opinion against him. He states that they are tired of him getting away with vigilante justice. Carlie claims to want in but then turns them into their captain Sergeant Palone, who unknown to her is the leader of the conspiracy. He later has Vin arrested as the sole suspect as Vin's precinct killed Bookie, who solved the murders first. While trapped in Rykers, Spider-Man learns that Vin is also at Rykers and about to be attacked by several inmates due to his career as a policeman and breaks out of his cell to protect his friend and roommate, and then breaks them both out of prison.

At the election day, another battle between Spider-Man and Menace ensues. Just as Menace is about to finish off Spider-Man, Harry shoots her with the vial, which is an antidote that returns her to normal form. He saves Spider-Man from the crowd and leaves. Lily is incarcerated, but later escapes, leaving Harry her ring and a note. Though he wins the election, Bill Hollister voluntarily refuses to accept the position as Mayor, since the truth about his daughter's secret activities has become public knowledge. Vin arrests Palone, and agrees to identify the officers involved in the Spider-Tracer conspiracy, but gets a light punishment of being fired from the NYPD and a six-month sentence in prison for his involvement.

== Reception ==
IGN gave the first issue 6.8 out of 10 and the second issue an 8.6.

== See also ==
- Spider-Man: Brand New Day
- New Ways to Die
