= Kindred (Marvel Comics) =

- Sarah and Gabriel, illustrated by Mike Deodato.

Publication information
- Publisher: Marvel Comics
- First appearance: As the "Stacy Twins": The Amazing Spider-Man #509 (August 2004); As American Son (Gabriel): Amazing Spider-Man Presents: American Son #1 (April 2010); As Kindred (masked): The Amazing Spider-Man (vol. 5) #1 (July 2018); As Kindred (unmasked): The Amazing Spider-Man #802 (September 2018)
- Created by: J. Michael Straczynski (writer); Mike Deodato (artist)

In-story information
- Full name: Gabriel; Sarah
- Species: Human Clones; Demon (as Kindred)
- Team affiliations: Interpol (Sarah)
- Notable aliases: Kindred; Gray Goblin (Gabriel); American Son (Gabriel); Harry Osborn
- Abilities: Gabriel: Gifted hand to hand combatant Superhuman strength, speed, stamina, durability and reflexes Healing factor Genius-level intellect Use of goblin-themed weapons and glider American Son armor grants: Superhuman strength and stamina

The Kindreds, or simply Kindred, is the name of several fictional characters appearing in American comic books published by Marvel Comics. Introduced in 2004 as Gabriel and Sarah, the alleged twin children of Norman Osborn and Gwen Stacy, with Gabriel becoming the Gray Goblin and later the second American Son, their true origin is later revealed during the Sinister War story-arc as a series of constantly dying and recreated clones of Peter Parker (with a combination of Norman Osborn's genes) and Gwen, created by a corrupted A.I. copy of Harry Osborn, that were then transformed into demonic revenants by Mephisto as Kindred (along with both the mastermind A.I. Osborn and the trapped soul of the deceased human Osborn, who would victimize his healthy clone Harry Lyman, the first American Son, for unwittingly stealing his life).

== Fictional character biography ==
=== Sins Past ===
Gabriel fighting Spider-Man.

The story arc "Sins Past" by J. Michael Straczynski reveals that Peter Parker's girlfriend Gwen Stacy became pregnant with twins, a boy and a girl, to whom she gave birth to while in France. Gwen vowed to raise the twins with Peter and refused to allow Norman Osborn / Green Goblin access to them, who in the present claimed the children were his, borne of a supposed affair with Gwen. Seeing Gwen as a threat to his potential heirs, the Green Goblin killed Gwen. Norman then raised Gwen's two children, a boy named Gabriel and a girl named Sarah. Due to Norman's enhanced blood, the twins age about 2-3 times faster than normal and are adults within the span of a few years (speculated to be between five and nine years old). Osborn tells the twins that Peter is their father and was responsible for their mother's death. Gabriel and Sarah then attack Spider-Man, and Spider-Man subsequently deduces their true identities thanks to a note they sent that had been written by Gwen while in Paris. Seeking to confirm it, Peter goes to Gwen's grave and digs up a sample of Gwen's DNA to compare to the twin's DNA which was obtained from the letter's envelope. Peter tells Mary Jane Watson about the initial encounter with Gabriel and Sarah, whereupon Mary Jane reveals of knowing about Norman's involvement with Gwen and tells all to Peter. Mary Jane has kept it from Peter all these years because Gwen was distraught and begged Mary Jane not to say anything, as well as not wanting to taint Peter's memory of the only woman Peter ever loved as much as — if not more than — Mary Jane. Arranging a press conference, Spider-Man tells Gabriel and Sarah to meet on the bridge where Gwen died, telling the truth about the twin's origins. Sarah believes Spider-Man — concluding that Peter would never have dug up Gwen's grave to acquire a DNA sample if there was even a chance of being their father, Spider-Man having never even run his own DNA against theirs because Peter and Gwen never reached that stage in their relationship — but Gabriel does not, resulting in him attempting to attack Spider-Man only to accidentally shoot Sarah. With their metabolisms out of control due to the Goblin formula within their metabolism, Gabriel returns to a secret base that Osborn told them to travel to after they had completed their mission. He takes more Goblin formula, becoming the Gray Goblin. This stabilized his aging at the cost of his sanity. Meanwhile, Sarah is taken to a hospital and given a transfusion of Spider-Man's blood. Spider-Man's abnormal blood also serving to stabilize her condition, both physically and mentally. When the Goblin tries to attack the weakened Spider-Man, Sarah shoots the Goblin's glider, recognizing that Spider-Man is not responsible for their mother's death, causing an explosion that results in her brother vanishing. Gabriel is later found washed up on a beach with no memory of what happened.

=== Sins Remembered ===
A follow-up story titled "Sins Remembered" was written by Samm Barnes with art by Scot Eaton. Peter locates Sarah in Paris, where Sarah has her brother Gabriel restrained in her home. With the help of Spider-Man and Interpol, Sarah helps build a case against the criminal Monsieur Dupres in exchange for Interpol's help with her rapid aging, which is causing her and Gabriel severe headaches. However, Gabriel escapes, prompting Sarah to join Interpol in hopes of finding her brother. This story arc was later collected as a trade paperback in 2005 as The Spectacular Spider-Man vol. 5: Sins Remembered (ISBN 0-7851-1628-1).

Straczynski ultimately wished to retcon the characters out of existence using the events of the "One More Day" story arc, but was not permitted to do so. Spider-Man reacts while confronting the villain Menace by saying there's "enough problems without yet another Gray Goblin to deal with". During the "Dark Reign" storyline, Molecule Man's torment of the Dark Avengers includes Osborn hallucinating a pregnant Gwen about to be killed, and one of Norman's male Super Soldier test subjects is identified as "G. Stacy".

=== Gabriel: American Son II ===
Gabriel returns in the American Son mini-series as the second version of American Son. He introduces himself to Harry Osborn (later known as Harry Lyman), then shoots him in the chest. American Son appears and saves Harry. After his attempt on Harry's life, Gabriel confronts the American Son battlesuit and demands to know why American Son interfered. It is subsequently revealed that Gabriel has stolen the American Son armor and is now suffering from a split personality, committing crimes as himself while American Son undoes the damage he has caused, identifying itself as the part of Gabriel that recognizes that what he is doing is wrong. Gabriel hears a planned ambush by a police squad and proceeds to attack; before he can do any real damage, however, he is stopped by Spider-Man. After kidnapping reporter Norah Winters and luring Harry to a vacant warehouse, Gabriel makes another attempt on Harry's life. While locked in combat, the two discuss their respective views of their father. Harry attempts to convince Gabriel that their father is an evil monster who only craves death and power while Gabriel tells Harry that his half-brother's a waste of the Osborn bloodline. Saddened by the inability to reach Gabriel, Harry hacks into the American Son armor and quickly overpowers Gabriel. After Gabriel is defeated, the warehouse is set on fire and he and Harry are saved by Spider-Man and a police squad. Following his capture, Gabriel is placed in a psychiatric hospital, and informed that the American Son suit is thought to be destroyed. However, a package is soon delivered to his room containing the American Son helmet and a note from his father telling him of loving Gabriel and missing his son.

=== Return as Kindred and new origin ===
An apparent demon going by the name of Kindred picks Mysterio to assist him in carrying out a plan of retaliation against Peter Parker, whom Kindred held accountable for an unpardonable sin. When Kindred meets with Norman Osborn in Ravencroft, Norman's Cletus Kasady persona states to Kindred that he has a message for him from Norman, who states that he is proud of him.

Norman claims to the clone of Ashley Kafka that Kindred is his son. When Kindred reveals itself to Peter, it has the face of Harry Osborn. Kindred torments Peter by showing him the corpses of his dead friends and family, putting Peter's soul through the reenactment of Harry's return, and killing him over and over again as Peter experiences flashbacks to better times with his friends. Norman captures Kindred and speaks to it, believing it to be Harry. Planning to redeem the Osborn name, Norman states to Kindred that he will find the truth that he talked about.

Carlie Cooper is asked to investigate the corpses dug up by Kindred, and is particularly horrified on uncovering an extra one. At that moment she is captured by Kindred. Carlie is imprisoned alongside a non-demonized Harry Lyman, who tells her that they have no chance of escape.

Carlie learns from Harry that he was lured to Europe by Kindred after following a trail of transactions from several dormant Oscorp bank accounts. Arriving at one of his father's former real estate holdings, Harry was attacked and captured by Kindred. Unbeknownst to Harry, Carlie is hiding that the corpse she discovered in the morgue was that of Harry Osborn. Harry suddenly notices that the door to their cell is open and suggests there is a way to escape.

Flashbacks dating back to Harry's childhood reveal that the cause of most of his personal problems, from addiction to insanity, comes from him having a tortured soul which Norman traded to Mephisto in exchange for a more prosperous quality of life, which Norman had been struggling to provide for him and his son. Norman is reminded of these deeds when he visits the house in Europe, discovering two cloning pods as well as an old artificial intelligence unit which houses Harry's brain waves. This version of Harry taunts his father.

The A.I. Harry reveals to his father that his half-siblings Gabriel and Sarah Stacy are not in reality Norman's children, and that he never had an intimate relationship with Gwen Stacy. Sarah and Gabriel were part of a major cloning conspiracy orchestrated by him, Mysterio, Mendel Stromm, and the Chameleon. Several versions of the twins were created, but each died from cellular degeneration. When the latest models were perfected, they were sent out into the world to confront Peter. Gabriel had one further model created that became involved in the American Son storyline. Now both twins have become host bodies for the AI Harry, which is why they have been taking Harry's form and have his memories, and it is revealed there were two Kindreds all along. Harry Lyman, uncovering his own body, confesses to Carlie that he knew all along he was never the true Harry. Harry escapes, but heads back to Kindred's base to confront him.

In a final battle with the Kindreds, Norman reveals the A.I. Harry had been influenced by Mephisto the entire time and apologizes to Harry for selling his soul. When Harry steps between Norman and a blow from Gabriel, he is fatally wounded. Collapsing into Peter's arms, Harry tells Peter this was always how it was "meant to be" and dies. Doctor Strange decides to gamble with Mephisto for the fate of Harry Osborn's soul and succeeds. His victory exorcises Mephisto from the twins, allowing them to die, and Harry's soul is freed.

== Powers and abilities ==
Gabriel and Sarah Stacy aged about 2-3 times faster than normal and were adults within the span of a few years. Their enhanced blood also gave the twins a slight increase in strength, reflexes, healing and endurance. But the aging causes the twins to suffer severe headaches. Sarah's condition was stabilized through a blood transfusion from Spider-Man, leaving her significantly more mentally stable (although her precise strength level is unclear). Meanwhile, Gabriel took the Goblin serum to have his condition stabilized which granted him further increased superhuman strength while also driving him insane as he adopted a Halloween-themed appearance as the Gray Goblin and used an arsenal of high-tech weapons (grenade-like "Pumpkin Bombs" and a bat-shaped "goblin glider"), and later acquired the American Son armor which granted him further strength and stamina.

As Kindred, the twins were bestowed by Mephisto with the demonically enhanced capabilities of immortality, super-strength, and control over centipedes such as the ones that protrude out of them. Each of the Kindreds possesses super-strength, superhuman stamina, enhanced durability, enhanced reflexes, a healing factor, and genius-level intellect. Their demonic abilities enable them to perform magic and revive the dead, perform entomancy (the ability to control insects like centipedes), dream projection, teleportation, and empowerment.

== Other versions ==
A vampiric alternate universe version of Gabriel Stacy / Gray Goblin appears in "Secret Wars".

== Character development ==
J. Michael Straczynski later stated originally wanting Peter Parker to be the father of Gwen Stacy's twins but the editors vetoed the idea, feeling that having two adult children would age the protagonist too much. It was then decided by the whole creative and editorial team that Norman Osborn would be the twins' father. Ultimately, the twins were eventually retconned not to be Stacy's and Osborn's children, but clones created by an A.I. of Norman's son Harry, serving as the true dual identity of Kindred, partly due to the huge backlash the original storyline caused among the fans, angered by the distortion of Gwen Stacy's character after the revelation of her supposed sexual intercourse with a creepy and evil man like Norman Osborn.

== In other media ==
- The Gray Goblin appears as a boss in Spider-Man Unlimited. This version is an alternate universe version of the Green Goblin and a member of a multiversal Sinister Six.
- Kindred appears in Marvel Contest of Champions.

== Reception ==
- In 2020, CBR.com ranked the Kindred 5th in their "Marvel: Dark Spider-Man Villains, Ranked From Lamest To Coolest" list.
- In 2022, Screen Rant ranked Kindred 3rd in their "10 Most Powerful Silk Villains In Marvel Comics" list.
