= The Night Gwen Stacy Died =

1973 story arc of The Amazing Spider-Man

- The Amazing Spider-Man #121 (June 1973). Cover art by John Romita Sr.
- Publisher: Marvel Comics
- Publication date: June – July 1973
- Genre: Superhero
- Title(s): The Amazing Spider-Man #121–122
- Main character(s): Spider-Man; Gwen Stacy; Green Goblin

Creative team
- Writer: Gerry Conway
- Penciller: Gil Kane
- Inker(s): John Romita; Tony Mortellaro
- Letterer: Artie Simek
- Colorist: David Hunt
- Editor: Roy Thomas

"The Night Gwen Stacy Died", alternatively known as "The Green Goblin's Last Stand" and colloquially as "The Death of Gwen Stacy", is a story arc of the Marvel Comics comic book series The Amazing Spider-Man #121–122 (June–July 1973). The two-issue story was written by Gerry Conway, with pencil art by Gil Kane and inking by John Romita Sr. and Tony Mortellaro. The story features a confrontation between Spider-Man and the Green Goblin. Having discovered Spider-Man's identity, the Green Goblin abducts Spider-Man's girlfriend Gwen Stacy. Gwen is killed during the battle, and a subsequent fight results in the Goblin's death.

Prior to the release of the story arc, it was not considered common for major members of a superhero's supporting cast to be killed. As a result, "The Night Gwen Stacy Died" is widely regarded as the most pivotal Spider-Man story outside of his origin and one of the most important comics of all time; its release is widely said to have ended the Silver Age of Comic Books and jumpstarted the Bronze Age, which further increased the emphasis on more mature subject matter pioneered by the Silver Age. Gwen's death and the story at large had major impact on the Marvel brand, as they directly led to increased emphasis on Luke Cage and Mary Jane Watson, the creation of the Punisher, and Green Goblin's status as Spider-Man's archenemy in alternate media and, following his resurrection during the Clone Saga, the comics.

The arc's popularity has led it to be alluded to in various alternate media, most notably partial direct adaptations in the feature films Spider-Man (2002) and The Amazing Spider-Man 2 (2014).

== Plot ==
The Amazing Spider-Man #122 (June 1973). Cover art by John Romita Sr.

Prior to this arc, Norman Osborn had been the Green Goblin, but due to amnesia, he had suspended his identity as the supervillain and forgotten that Spider-Man is Peter Parker. Also, Harry Osborn, Parker's best friend and Norman's son, became addicted to drugs and was sequestered in the Osborn home for detoxification. Norman's parental grief, combined with financial pressure, triggered a breakdown resulting in Norman Osborn remembering his Goblin identity and again targeting Spider-Man and his loved ones for misery.

The Green Goblin abducts Peter's girlfriend, Gwen Stacy, and lures Spider-Man to a tower of either the Brooklyn Bridge (as depicted in the art) or the George Washington Bridge (as given in the text). The Goblin and Spider-Man clash, and the Goblin hurls Gwen off the bridge. Spider-Man shoots a web strand at her legs and catches her. As he pulls her up, he thinks he has saved her, however he quickly realizes she is dead. Unsure whether her neck was broken by the whiplash from her sudden stop or had been already broken by the Goblin prior to her fall, he blames himself for her death. A note on the letters page of The Amazing Spider-Man #125 states: "It saddens us to say that the whiplash effect she underwent when Spidey's webbing stopped her so suddenly was, in fact, what killed her.", although later issues would reveal Gwen died from the fall itself.

The Green Goblin escapes, and Spider-Man cries over Gwen's corpse and swears revenge. The following issue, Spider-Man tracks the Green Goblin to a warehouse and beats him but cannot bring himself to kill him. The Goblin uses the opportunity to send his glider to impale Spider-Man from behind. Warned by his spider-sense, Spider-Man dodges, and the glider instead impales the Green Goblin, seemingly killing him. Later, a devastated Parker, back at home, encounters an equally shocked and saddened Mary Jane Watson, who has lost a close friend with Gwen's death, and the two attempt to comfort each other in the wake of their loss.

== Significance ==
- The death of Gwen Stacy shocked the American comic book community. Previously, it had been unthinkable to kill off such an important character—the girlfriend of a protagonist with a large fanbase. Generally, a superhero did not fail so disastrously unless it was part of their origin story. This story arc has been proposed as a marker of beginning of the end of the Silver Age of Comic Books, and the beginning of the darker, grittier Bronze Age.
- The subsequent tendency for the wives and girlfriends of male superheroes to meet grim fates was referred to as "The Gwen Stacy Syndrome" by the Comics Buyer's Guide.
- A fan poll conducted by Marvel Comics, for their 2001 series The 100 Greatest Marvels of All Time, voted The Amazing Spider-Man (vol. 1) #121 and #122 to be the 6th and 19th greatest issues of all time, respectively.
- Writer Brian Michael Bendis paid tribute to the death of Gwen Stacy in his modernized reboot, Ultimate Spider-Man. In the Ultimate Marvel Universe of Earth-1610, The Green Goblin attempts to retaliate against Spider-Man for turning down his offer to join him by capturing his girlfriend Mary Jane Watson, throwing her off the George Washington Bridge in an homage to Stacy's death. Unlike Stacy in the main continuity, Watson survives, albeit with severe trauma.

== Development ==
=== Behind the scenes ===
Inker John Romita Sr. recalled in a 2015 interview how the character to be killed off for what became The Night Gwen Stacy Died was selected. Romita and Amazing Spider-Man writer Gerry Conway were initially asked by the editors to kill off Aunt May. They organized a plot session at Conway's apartment and disagreed with killing Aunt May, opining that if she were to die, Peter would not have to worry about her anymore and be no longer treated as a child again, thus deciding to kill either Mary Jane Watson or Gwen Stacy. Romita advised against the former, because Mary Jane was a comic relief character at the time. Instead, recalling cartoonist Milton Caniff's decision to kill off a lead character's love interest in Terry and the Pirates, Romita proposed killing Gwen Stacy.

Writer Conway's memory of how Gwen was selected as the character to be killed off is more contradictory: in 2008 he told author Sean Howe that it was he and editor Roy Thomas who first discussed killing off Aunt May, but when Romita heard about this he suggested that Gwen was a more suitable candidate. Later, during a 2013 interview at the Emerald City Comic Con, Conway contradicted himself by claiming that it was initially Romita's idea to kill off Aunt May and that he disagreed and had to talk Romita out of that choice.

Stan Lee, co-creator of both Spider-Man and Gwen Stacy, was consulted by Conway, editor Roy Thomas and Romita about killing Gwen Stacy. When asked about how he accepted the decision, Lee said: "... I was just getting ready to go to Europe on some sort of a business trip... to meet somebody to discuss something about Marvel. And I think I wasn't thinking too clearly, because when they said, 'We'd like to kill Gwen Stacy,' I said, 'Well, if that's what you want to do, okay.' All I wanted to do was get them out of the office so I could finish packing and get out of there. ... and when I came back and found out that Gwen had been killed, I thought 'Why would they do that? Why would Gerry write anything like that?' And I had to be reminded later on that I had perhaps reluctantly or perhaps carelessly said 'Okay' when they asked me." Conversely, Romita recalls that Lee was already out of the country when the decision was made and that they took a time to talk him into it, yet Lee remained very upset.

In the comic book collection The 100 Greatest Marvels of All Time: #9-6 (Amazing Spider-Man #121 was the #6 comic), Conway explained that Gwen and Peter were a "perfect couple", but taking that relationship to the next level (i.e. marriage or at least Peter revealing his secret identity to her) would "betray everything that Spider-Man was about", i.e. personal tragedy and anguish as root of Peter's life as Spider-Man. Killing Gwen Stacy was a perfect opportunity to kill two birds with one stone: breaking up the "unfitting" relationship and reinforcing the element of personal tragedy which was, in his opinion, the essence of Spider-Man.

=== Bridge ===
The bridge in the original issue of Amazing Spider-Man #121 was stated in the text to be the George Washington Bridge. The Pulse #4 (Sept. 2004) also states the bridge to be the George Washington Bridge.

The art of The Amazing Spider-Man #121, however, depicts the Brooklyn Bridge. Some reprints of the issue have had the text amended and now state the bridge to be the Brooklyn Bridge rather than the George Washington Bridge. Titles supporting the Brooklyn Bridge include The Amazing Spider-Man #147–148 (1975), The Amazing Spider-Man Annual #21 (1987), Web of Spider-Man #118 (1994), and Daredevil v. 2 #8 (2000). In a television interview for the Travel Channel's Marvel Superheroes Guide to New York City (2004), Stan Lee said that the artist for the issue had drawn the Brooklyn Bridge, but that he (as editor) mistakenly labeled it the George Washington Bridge. This was corrected in newer prints of the issue.

Different bridges are depicted in subsequent adaptations of the storyline. Mary Jane Watson was thrown off the Queensboro Bridge in both Ultimate Spider-Man #25 and the Spider-Man movie, while in Spider-Man: The Animated Series, Mary Jane is thrown off the George Washington Bridge.

=== Cause of death ===
Gwen Stacy's death in The Amazing Spider-Man #121.

The comic features a "snap" sound effect next to Gwen Stacy's head in the panel in which Spider-Man's webbing catches her. In The Amazing Spider-Man #125 (Oct. 1973), Marvel Comics editor Roy Thomas wrote in the letters column that "it saddens us to have to say that the whiplash effect she underwent when Spidey's webbing stopped her so suddenly was, in fact, what killed her. In short, it was impossible for Peter to save her. He couldn't have swung down in time; the action he did take resulted in her death; if he had done nothing, she still would certainly have perished. There was no way out."

In the History Channel special Spider-Man Tech, Stan Lee states that her neck was indeed snapped.

Physicist and comic collector James Kakalios, in his book The Physics of Superheroes, states that in the real world, the whiplash effect would have killed her. The comic book Civil War: Casualties of War: Captain America/Iron Man (2007) concurred that the proximate cause of death was the sudden stop during a high-speed fall. An issue of Peter Parker: Spider-Man revisits the issue, and further confirms Gwen died of a broken neck due to the use of the webbing.

For some time, however, fans speculated that the shock of the fall itself caused Gwen Stacy's death, due to the Green Goblin telling Spider-Man in The Amazing Spider-Man #121, "Romantic idiot! She was dead before your webbing reached her! A fall from that height would kill anyone — before they struck the ground!" In the 1987 edition of The Official Handbook of the Marvel Universe, Gwen's death is attributed to the fall, not to Spider-Man's webbing. In the fourth issue of Marvels, it was reported that she died from the shock of the fall, however Phil, a photographer and witness, is unsure about exactly what kills her.

=== Replays ===
Several subsequent issues have echoed Gwen's death when others fell from great heights during Spider-Man's battles. On most occasions, he saves them by jumping after them and working with their momentum, rather than trying to stop them with his webbing (as he did in the What If? where he saves Gwen), most notably when he jumped off the same bridge to save Sarah Stacy.

In another storyline, the Green Goblin once again replays the scenario, this time with Spider-Man's wife Mary Jane Watson. As with Gwen, Mary Jane plummets toward her death (this time from the recoil from her gun when she shoots at the Green Goblin). Learning from his previous error, Spider-Man uses multiple weblines and catches every major joint, saving Mary Jane from suffering the same whiplash effect that killed Gwen. A similar event occurs when Spider-Man saves Anna Maria Marconi—the girlfriend of Otto Octavius during a time when he was in Spider-Man's body—when Green Goblin uses her as a hostage and throws her off a building after learning that his true enemy has returned, Peter reflecting as he catches Anna Maria that he has learned over time to catch every joint in moments like this to limit potential whiplash.

During the Civil War, both Iron Man and Captain America cited Gwen as argument for their opinions on the Superhuman Registration Act. Iron Man argued that if Spider-Man had received proper training as registered heroes were given, he would have saved her, while Captain America argued that Gwen was only in danger because the Goblin knew Spider-Man's identity, the Act requiring heroes to register their identities with the government.

After Jane Foster becomes Valkyrie, she is reminded of how Spider-Man failed to save someone in a similar situation when she is forced to use her shape-shifting weapon to catch the fatally wounded Heimdall as he falls from a building after being attacked by Bullseye, and expresses concern that her actions have made Heimdall's wounds worse, but Heimdall gives no indication that he blames Jane for his death.

=== Attempted resurrections ===
As John Romita Sr. recalls, Stan Lee's initial reaction towards Gwen Stacy's death was negative because he thought that Romita, Conway and Thomas had done it behind his back and he demanded that they bring her back immediately. Thomas, Romita and other editorial board members, however, convinced him otherwise, stating that this would be an "embarrassing silliness" and could ruin the emotional impact of her death.

While developing the story for the Spider-Man: One More Day storyline along with Brian Michael Bendis, Mark Millar, Ed Brubaker and Dan Slott; Joe Quesada and J. Michael Straczynski made plans to resurrect Gwen Stacy along with Harry Osborn, who had been killed in The Spectacular Spider-Man #200 and ultimately revived during the story (though this Harry was later revealed to be a clone who later died himself during the "Kindred Rising" storyline). Numerous Marvel writers and editors, however, lobbied for Stacy to remain dead, forcing Quesada and Straczynski to discard their idea upon frustratingly realizing that they were outnumbered. Among the changes to continuity going as far back as 1971, Straczynski's original script had, as a consequence of Mephisto erasing Spider-Man's and Mary Jane's marriage from reality, Gwen Stacy being restored to life as her death never happened as well her affair with Norman Osborn.

Gwen was ultimately resurrected, albeit for just a few minutes, by the Celestial the Progenitor during the event "A.X.E.: Judgment Day", as a gift to Peter for passing his judgment.

In the team-up miniseries Gwenpool: All-New, All-Deadly, Gwen is revived once again, after the severed head of her clone from "Dead No More" is grown a new immortal clone body below the neck by Weapon X and dressed in a purple version of Gwen Poole's suit, who use the nano-charges Ben put in her head to control her as Weapon X-31. After accidentally killing Poole and visiting her own grave, Gwen teams up with Poole's ghost as well as Peter in taking down her most-recent resurrector, while unaware that she should still have her soul. After Poole is revived and reunited with her life partner Kate Bishop and pet Jeff the Land Shark, Gwen asks out Peter again, only to be rejected (due to Peter knowing her to be a clone), with Gwen then passing off her asking as a joke and joining Peter and the other heroes in facing Fin Fang Foom. In addition, the fourth chapter of this miniseries, in which Poole's ghost seeks revenge on Gwen before teaming up with her, is titled "The Death of Gwen Stacy Part II-- This Time, It's Personal!", in reference to the original storyline.

=== What If? ===
In a non-canonical parallel universe story in What If? #24 – "What If Gwen Stacy Had Lived?", Spider-Man saves Gwen by jumping after her rather than catching her with a web-line (in the same way he saved Mary Jane in the film), allowing him to cushion her from the impact as they hit the water and subsequently give her CPR. In the aftermath of this rescue, he proposes to Gwen after revealing his secret identity to her, and, in a subsequent confrontation with the Green Goblin, Norman Osborn finally fights off his evil side when Harry moves to protect him from Spider-Man regardless of what he'd become. Their life, however, is not destined to be a happy one; to ensure his victory, the Goblin had sent J. Jonah Jameson proof of Spider-Man's real identity, which Jonah had subsequently published and used to acquire a warrant for Peter's arrest, thus forcing Peter to escape from the police mere moments after his wedding to Gwen. As the issue ends, Gwen departs with Joe "Robbie" Robertson, who promises Gwen that they would do whatever they could to help Peter after he berates Jonah for his actions and quits the Bugle.

In What If? vol. 2 #42 – "What If Spider-Man Had Kept His Six Arms?", Peter is able to prevent Gwen's death by using his additional arms to catch her as she falls.

At the end of the one-shot What If: The Other by Peter David, Peter (now calling himself "Poison") uses part of the Venom symbiote attached to him resurrect Gwen.

In What If? Punisher #1 – "What if Peter Parker became the Punisher?", Peter, who becomes the Punisher in this continuity, is able to save Gwen by killing the Green Goblin and webbing her body to a suspended scaffold on the bridge. Feeling guilty over almost getting her killed, he quits being the Punisher to be with her, leaving his costume in a bin, where it is found by Frank Castle.

In What If...Dark? Spider-Gwen #1 (which was co-written by Conway), titled "The Night Peter Parker Died", Spider-Man saves Gwen by jumping after her, but the Green Goblin cuts his web line when he tries to shoot it at the bridge, resulting in him breaking his neck on a pillar while his corpse cushions Gwen's fall. Gwen discovers Peter's secret and vows to take revenge on the Goblin while donning Spider-Man's costume. As she lacks training and super powers, she works with Harry to set up a trap for the villain. After successfully capturing him with a web bomb, she prepares to kill him with her father's gun before realizing doing so would betray Peter's memory. Harry however does pull the trigger and is horrified upon discovering his father was the Green Goblin. Blaming Gwen for Norman's death, Harry becomes the new Green Goblin while Gwen promises Peter she will clean up the mess she made as Spider-Woman.

== Reception ==
Gwen's death shocked Spider-Man readers, with some appreciating the bold move and others horrified by the unexpected demise of a popular character. In Amazing Spider-Man #125 (Oct 1973), an editorial comment on the letters page explained the creators' view:

"The relationship between Pete and Gwen had been through a lot of inconsequential ups and downs, and unless the two were to be married, there was nowhere else to take it. But marriage seemed wrong, too. Peter just wasn't ready. So Gerry, Roy and Stan debated the question… All had reached the same inescapable conclusion. Gwen's death was simply fated to happen. Events had shaped themselves in such a way that their only logical resolution was tragedy. So don't blame Gerry. Don't blame Stan. Don't blame anyone. Only the inscrutable, inexorable workings of circumstance are culpable this time."

Fans were not appeased by this explanation, and Romita says that Marvel received some death threats.

== In other media ==
=== Television ===
- "The Night Gwen Stacy Died" was adapted in Spider-Man: The Animated Series. In the episode "Turning Point", the Green Goblin hurtles Mary Jane Watson off the bridge, but instead of dying, she falls through a portal, unseen to Peter Parker believing she has fallen and perished in the water below. The episode's name is the same as the main cover caption of the first issue in "The Night Gwen Stacy Died" arc.
- "The Night Gwen Stacy Died" is somewhat reenacted in the animated series Ultimate Spider-Man. Instead of Gwen Stacy, other female characters that have a connection to Spider-Man are the Green Goblin's would-be victims: White Tiger (Ava Ayala) in the episode "Ultimate", and Petra Parker / Spider-Girl in the episode "The Spider-Verse (Part 1)".
- "The Night Gwen Stacy Died" was loosely adapted in the 2016 four-part season finale of the third season of Agents of S.H.I.E.L.D., collectively known as "Fallen Agent", with Daisy Johnson and Lincoln Campbell respectively taking the roles of Spider-Man and Gwen Stacy. The episodes were marketed with a promotional poster for the event recreating the cover of The Amazing Spider-Man #121 with the series' cast (created by Greg Land, and also appearing as a variant cover for Civil War II #0), teasing the identity of the finale's titular Fallen Agent.

=== Film ===
- "The Night Gwen Stacy Died" was adapted into the end of Sam Raimi's Spider-Man (2002), with Mary Jane Watson again taking the role, although she does not die; Spider-Man manages to save her by jumping after her and catching her in person, subsequently battling the Green Goblin after lowering Mary Jane to safety, although Green Goblin dies similarly to how he did in the comics.
- "The Night Gwen Stacy Died" was adapted in Marc Webb's The Amazing Spider-Man 2 (2014). The Green Goblin—here Harry Osborn rather than Norman—drops Gwen Stacy through the top of a clock tower. Spider-Man saves her and knocks the Goblin off of his glider. The glider collides with the clock tower that Gwen is standing on, and she falls. Spider-Man catches her again and she dangles below until the turning clock gears cut the web Gwen is hanging from, just as the Goblin attacks him. After knocking aside the Goblin, Spider-Man dives down to Gwen, shooting a web to try and save her; but even though the web catches her, her head still hits the floor of the clock tower, the impact of which kills her instantly. In a deleted scene, Peter subsequently takes Harry's glider, hoists it above his head in rage and considers impaling him with it, but decides against it, leaving him to be arrested for her murder. The clock stops at 1:21, a reference to the issue of the comic book in which Gwen died. Additionally, one of the promotional posters for the film recreated the cover of The Amazing Spider-Man #121 with the film's cast.
- "The Night Gwen Stacy Died" was adapted into the end of the Sony's Spider-Man Universe film Venom: Let There Be Carnage (2021), with Anne Weying taking the role of Gwen, Eddie Brock and Venom taking the role of Spider-Man, and Cletus Kasady and Carnage taking the role of the Green Goblin; however, Anne does not die, as Eddie and Venom jointly use the latter's symbiote tendrils to save her by lowering her to safety into the arms of her waiting fiancé Dan Lewis at the bottom of a chapel they were at the top of, before returning to continue fighting Cletus and Carnage after they had tried to kill her. Anne's fall is specifically modeled after Gwen's death as depicted in The Amazing Spider-Man 2, as a subversion of the events depicted.
- Elements from the aforementioned films and the original comic were featured in the Marvel Cinematic Universe (MCU) film Spider-Man: No Way Home (2021), which features characters from the Raimi and Webb films via the plot element of the multiverse. The Green Goblin from the Raimi films kills the MCU version of May by attacking her with his glider and blowing up the floor he and MCU Peter were fighting on, leading Peter to become bitter and vengeful similar to how the comic version was after Gwen's death. When the two alternate Peter Parkers arrive to console the MCU Peter, the Peter from the Webb films mentioned how he stopped pulling his punches after Gwen's death in The Amazing Spider-Man 2, and warns his counterpart not to become like him. During the climax, the Peter from the Webb films manages to save MCU Peter's girlfriend MJ from suffering a similar fate to Gwen as she falls from the Statue of Liberty by jumping after her and catching her in person, breaking down in tears upon finally reaching closure with his previous failure. MCU Peter attempts to kill the Goblin with his own glider, similar to the 2002 film, and recreating The Amazing Spider-Man 2 deleted scene, but is stopped by the Peter from the Raimi films, and instead cures Norman of his insanity.

=== Video games ===
- The storyline was referenced in the fighting game Marvel Tokon: Fighting Souls. On top of the Green Goblin mentioning Gwen's death to Spider-Man in one of their personalized intros, if the Green Goblin wins a match, he'll take his defeated opponent and drop them from a tall height similar to what he did to Gwen.
