= James Kakalios =

American physicist

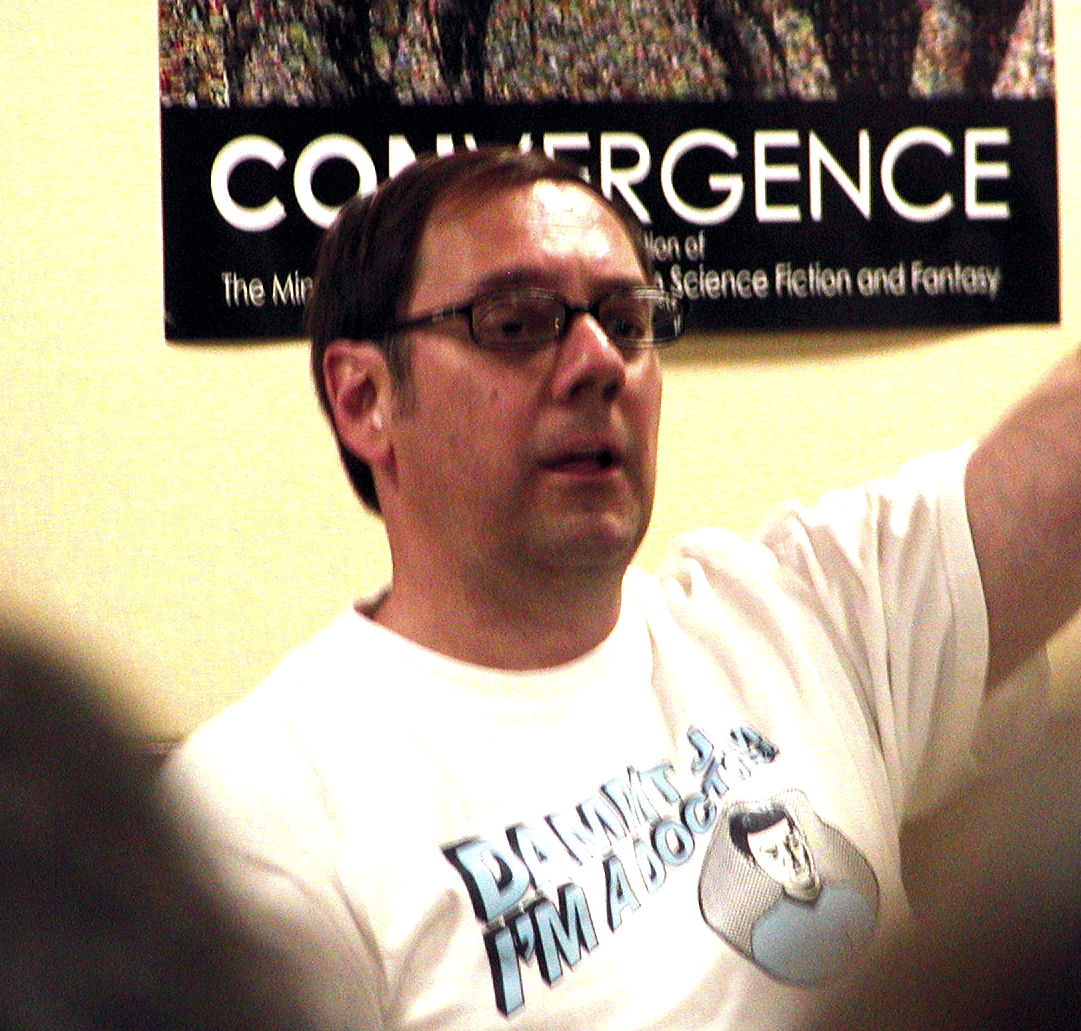
- Kakalios in 2008
- Born: December 27, 1958 (age 67)
- Citizenship: United States
- Education: City College of New York; University of Chicago
- Known for: The Physics of Superheroes
- Scientific career
- Fields: Condensed matter physics
- Workplaces: University of Minnesota
- Website: www.kakalios.com

James Kakalios (born December 27, 1958) is a physics professor and head of the School of Physics and Astronomy at the University of Minnesota. Known within the scientific community for his work with amorphous semiconductors, granular materials, and 1/f noise, he is known to the general public as the author of the book The Physics of Superheroes, which considers comic book superheroes from the standpoint of fundamental physics.

== Biography ==
Kakalios earned his B.S. degree from City College of New York in 1979 and his M.S. and PhD degrees from the University of Chicago in 1982 and 1985. He began his comic book collection as a graduate student as a way to relieve stress. At Minnesota, he taught a freshman seminar that focused on the physics of superheroes as a way to motivate students to think about physics. This course gained great popularity as an enticing alternative to the typical inclined planes and pulleys of physics.

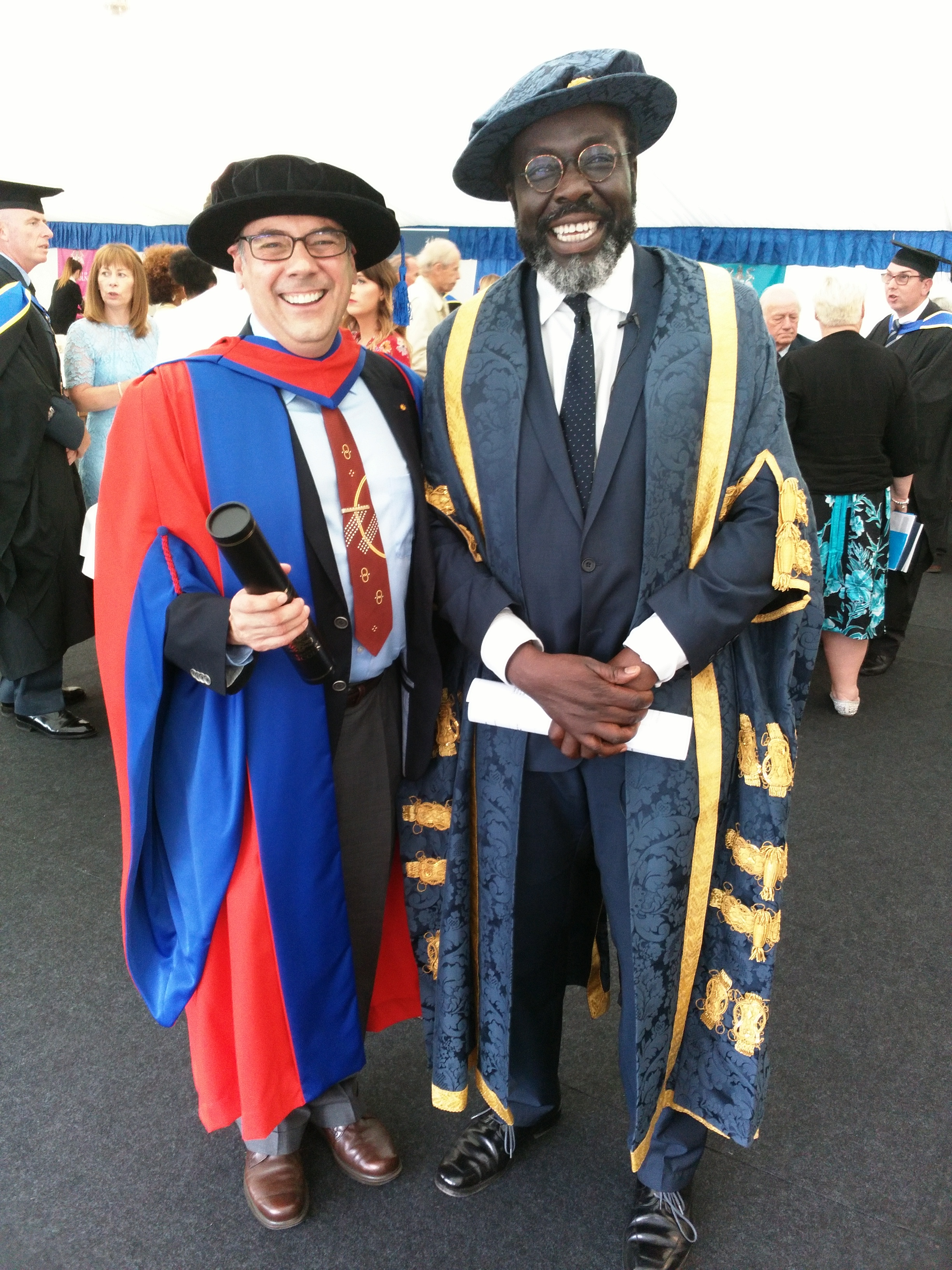
James Kakalios (left) with the University of Lincoln (UK) Chancellor Lord Victor Adebowale (right) after receiving Honorary DSc degree. 7th September 2017, Lincoln, UK.

The seminar was a great success, leading to articles in popular magazines including People, lectures on the subject, and publication of The Physics of Superheroes. In his talks, favorite examples are the death of Gwen Stacy (Spider-Man's girlfriend), "can Superman jump over tall buildings and what does this tell us about Krypton?", the high-velocity actions of The Flash, and the shrinking problem of the Atom. His analysis of Gwen Stacy's death eventually became integral to the plot of a new Spider-Man comic.

Kakalios is of the opinion that the most unrealistic aspect of the comic-book universe is often the sociology. He notes that pedestrians do not usually provide running monologues describing everything around them. There is one aspect of the story of the Atom that he does not question, however. The Atom begins as a physics professor, who encounters a chunk of white dwarf star and picks it up. "By a conservative estimate, he is lifting about 5000 metric tons. This is not unreasonable. We physics professors are just that strong."

He provides content on the DVD of the film Watchmen. Under extras, he is filmed discussing the physics of superheroes. As one of the film's lead scientific consultants of the 2012 film The Amazing Spider-Man, Kakalios designed the film's "decay rate algorithm", which was inspired by the real-life Gompertz–Makeham law of mortality.

Kakalios has been nominated by the University of Minnesota to be one of the USA Science and Engineering Festival's Nifty Fifty Speakers who will speak about his work and career to middle and high school students in October 2010.

James Kakalios was awarded an Honorary Doctor of Science degree from the University of Lincoln, UK (2017).

He was also awarded the AAAS Public Engagement with Science Award in 2014.

== Works ==
- Kakalios, James (2005). The Physics of Superheroes. Gotham Books. ISBN 1-59240-242-9.
- Kakalios, James (2011). The Amazing Story of Quantum Mechanics: A Math-Free Exploration of the Science That Made Our World. Avery. ISBN 978-1592406722.
- Kakalios, James (2017). The Physics of Everyday Things. Crown. ISBN 978-0770437732.
