= Gwen Stacy =

Marvel Comics fictional character

- Artwork from the cover of Gwen Stacy #1 (February 2020); Art by Adam Hughes

Publication information
- Publisher: Marvel Comics
- First appearance: The Amazing Spider-Man #31 (December 1965)
- Created by: Stan Lee (writer); Steve Ditko (artist)

In-story information
- Full name: Gwendolyne Maxine Stacy
- Place of origin: New York City
- Supporting character of: Spider-Man
- Notable aliases: X-31
- Abilities: Gifted biochemist; Expert investigative skills; As Weapon X-31: Superhuman strength, speed, durability, stamina, agility, and reflexes; Indestructible bones via adamantium; Retractable adamantium sword-arms; Regenerative healing factor; Immortality

Gwendolyne Maxine "Gwen" Stacy is a character appearing in American comic books published by Marvel Comics, usually as a supporting character of Spider-Man (Peter Parker). A college student and the daughter of George and Helen Stacy, Gwen was one of Peter's early romantic interests, the first following his high school graduation. In the story "The Night Gwen Stacy Died" (1973), the character is murdered by the Green Goblin (Norman Osborn). The story had a major impact on the series and on the audience for super hero comic books. Stories published long afterwards indicate Peter's unresolved grief regarding her death. The story of her life and death is revisited in Marvels (1994) by Alex Ross and Spider-Man: Blue (2002–2003) by Jeph Loeb; a flashback solo miniseries, Gwen Stacy: Beyond Amazing (2020–2024), was written by Christos Gage.

A posthumous clone of the character was first introduced in the 1970s and reappeared in the 1980s and 1990s. This plotline was later expanded, and has resulted in multiple alternate versions of the character. In "Dead No More: The Clone Conspiracy" (2016–2017), Gwen is resurrected in a clone body with her soul intact, but dies soon afterward from clone degeneration. In the storyline "All-New, All-Deadly", the clone Gwen has her body restored and is made into an assassin called X-31. There are also versions of Gwen Stacy who appear in alternate universe stories. In the Ultimate Marvel (Earth-1610) stories (2000–2011), Gwen is drained and apparently killed by Carnage, before becoming Carnage, her mind overtaking the symbiote. In the Spider-Gwen (Earth-65) series (2015–2024), she becomes Spider-Woman. In a later version of the Ultimate Spider-Man (Earth-6160) series (2024–2026), Gwen becomes Mysterio, the CEO of Oscorp, who is married to the superhero Harry Osborn.

The character was portrayed by Bryce Dallas Howard in Spider-Man 3 (2007) and by Emma Stone in The Amazing Spider-Man film series (2012–2014). The Spider-Gwen version of the character is voiced by Hailee Steinfeld in the animated film Spider-Man: Into the Spider-Verse (2018) and its sequels Across the Spider-Verse (2023) and Beyond the Spider-Verse (2027).

== Publication history ==
=== 1960s ===
Created by writer Stan Lee and artist Steve Ditko, Gwen Stacy first appeared in The Amazing Spider-Man #31 (December 1965) as the primary love interest of Peter Parker. Beginning with issue #39, John Romita Sr. became the primary artist and co-plotter of the series, replacing Ditko. Romita's background was in romance comics, and he was partly chosen to depict the young female characters as "very sexy and flashy," in his words; he drew inspiration from magazines such as Seventeen.

According to Lee, the original intent was for Gwen Stacy to be Spider-Man's central love interest. However, Mary Jane Watson, first depicted in The Amazing Spider-Man #42 (November 1966), became increasingly popular with readers as an alternative girlfriend. This popularity changed the course of the plan, as fans demanded she be Peter Parker's main love interest instead, and that "no matter how we [i.e. Lee and his artist/co-plotter collaborators] wrote it, Mary Jane always seemed more interesting!" As Lee said, "Gwen was a sweet girl, everything about her was pure and wholesome and loyal and wonderful. I thought she'd be the perfect wife for Peter. On the other hand Mary Jane was a real party girl." Romita said that

When I started drawing Gwen, I thought of her as an intelligent, responsible, level-headed and well-behaved young lady, kind of the opposite of Mary Jane. Stan started using Mary Jane to make Gwen jealous of Peter. In other words, Gwen never would have noticed Peter if Mary Jane hadn't started throwing herself at him. Stan decided to fool the readers and make Gwen the girlfriend. I kept trying to make Gwen look more glamorous.

Amazing Spider-Man #56 (January 1968) introduced Gwen's father, NYPD Captain George Stacy; later issues portray her mother Helen Stacy and her uncle Arthur Stacy. Her father is both fond of Peter and supportive of his alter-ego Spider-Man.

=== 1970s ===
In issue #90 (1970), George Stacy is killed by falling debris during a battle involving Spider-Man and Doctor Octopus. Gwen blames Spider-Man for his death, and leaves for Europe to cope with her loss. She wants Peter to ask her to marry him and convince her to stay, but his guilt stops him from proposing. Gwen's feelings for Peter eventually prompt her to return to New York, and their relationship is rekindled.

Gerry Conway and Roy Thomas succeeded Stan Lee as writer and editor, respectively, of The Amazing Spider-Man. Together with inker John Romita, Sr., they came to the decision to have Gwen killed. Romita first suggested the idea, during a plotting session with Conway when Romita was still penciller on The Amazing Spider-Man. Romita said that Thomas and Conway wanted to shock the readers with an unexpected death, initially considering Aunt May, which Romita rejected. Romita recalled the death of a love interest in the comic strip Terry and the Pirates which had significant cultural impact, and decided that "we would really shake up the fans if we killed Peter's girlfriend."

Conway later said his contribution to the decision was motivated by a desire to bring Mary Jane Watson to the forefront, as he shared Lee's feeling that she was a more interesting character than Gwen Stacy: "[Mary Jane] hadn't lost the edge that made her an interesting character. Gwen didn't have an edge. She was just a nice person". In the story arc "The Night Gwen Stacy Died" written by Gerry Conway, published in The Amazing Spider-Man #121–122 (June–July 1973), Gwen is killed off, murdered by the Green Goblin Norman Osborn.

Both the decision to kill Gwen and the method in which Marvel implemented it remain controversial among fans and some writers. Conway claimed that Stan Lee endorsed the decision, but Lee contended that he was sorry that she had been killed off and that he "would have enjoyed keeping both Gwen and MJ and letting them play off against each other." In 2004, Romita recalled:

the fans were outraged. They threatened me and Gary and Stan. Here it is almost forty years later, and the fans are still talking about the death of Gwen Stacy –– so I guess we made the right choice.

In the story, Norman Osborn, the Green Goblin, has become aware of Spider-Man secret identity as Peter Parker, and seeks revenge because he blames Peter for a recent drug overdose experienced by his son, Harry Osborn. The Green Goblin kidnaps Gwen. Although he is ill, Spider-Man searches for Gwen and eventually discovers her, unconscious on top of the Brooklyn Bridge. During the ensuing battle the Goblin slams into Gwen and sends her hurtling toward the water. Spider-Man shoots a webline to catch her, but the sudden stop snaps her neck, killing her.

The death became a pivotal point in both Spider-Man's history and in American comic books in general. Many point to Gwen's death as the end of the Silver Age of Comics. Before her death, except possibly as part of an origin story, superheroes did not fail so catastrophically, nor did the hero's loved ones die so suddenly and without warning. Conway said that he added the "SNAP" sound effect subconsciously without realizing its implications, but became fascinated by the effects of Spider-Man's complicity in Gwen's death on the possibilities of comic books.

A note on the letters page of The Amazing Spider-Man #125 states: "It saddens us to say that the whiplash effect she underwent when Spidey's webbing stopped her so suddenly was, in fact, what killed her". The comic book Civil War: Casualties of War: Captain America/Iron Man (2007) concurred that the proximate cause of death was the sudden stop during a high-speed fall. An issue of Peter Parker/Spider-Man revisits the issue, and further confirms Gwen died of a broken neck due to the use of the webbing. On the other hand, in the 1987 edition of the Official Handbook of the Marvel Universe, Gwen's death is attributed to the fall, not to Spider-Man's webbing, though the listed cause of death is still technically true – if she had not fallen from the bridge, the event that caused her death could not have happened. In his book The Physics of Superheroes, physicist James Kakalios confirms that, consistent with Newton's laws of motion, the sudden stop would have killed Gwen Stacy.

The then-Mexican publisher of Marvel Comics, La Prensa, did not think the Latin American readership would accept Gwen's death, and so diverged El Sorprendente Hombre-Araña into its own continuity with brand new stories (written by Raul Martinez and drawn by José Luis González Durán) in which Peter Parker and Gwen Stacy were still a couple, and Stacy was still alive, for another 60 issues and 45 stories, ending in 1974 when another publisher picked up the Marvel rights.

Stan Lee (who had since become Marvel's publisher) was frequently criticized by fans during his public appearances for killing off Gwen Stacy. Lee, who had also found the character's death objectionable, insisted that Conway write a story bringing her back. While Conway objected, he eventually gave in under the condition that after reviving Gwen, he could write her out of the book as soon as he wanted. He decided that cloning would be the best means to bring the character back. In the resulting story, published in Amazing Spider-Man #144 (May 1975), a clone of Gwen is created, perfectly healthy but with no memory of the time since her death. At the end of the story, Gwen's clone, a creation of Spider-Man villain the Jackal, leaves to find a new life for herself, accepting that she is not really the same person who had a relationship with Peter Parker.

=== 1980s ===
In the 1988 crossover "The Evolutionary War", the High Evolutionary, who had once been Miles Warren's teacher, captures Gwen's clone. He determines that Warren had actually not perfected the process, and instead injected a young woman with a genetic virus carrying Gwen's DNA, turning her into a copy of Gwen. After a subsequent altercation of Spider-Man and the Young Gods against the High Evolutionary's Purifiers, this woman is purged of the virus by the Young Goddess Daydreamer. This is later retconned, with the High Evolutionary stating that Warren had in fact succeeded in perfecting his own cloning technique, and Daydreamer had accidentally given the Gwen clone a false new life under the name of Joyce Delaney.

=== 1990s ===
The death of Gwen Stacy is retold from another perspective in the fourth and final issue of the miniseries Marvels (April 1994), by Kurt Busiek and Alex Ross. In the story, photographer Phil Sheldon befriends Gwen Stacy, who has absolved Spider-Man of any blame for her father's death. Gwen's simple faith in heroes convinces Sheldon of the purpose of superheroes—to protect innocents such as Gwen. He resolves to write a book to praise the heroes and what they should mean to humanity. When the Green Goblin kidnaps Gwen and holds her hostage to bait Spider-Man, Sheldon frantically follows the resulting chase in a taxi and witnesses her death. While it is reported that she died from the shock of the fall, Sheldon thinks it looks like something else, and Sheldon's faith in superheroes is shattered. Gerry Conway credits the story with revealing and exploring the cultural significance of Gwen Stacy's death.

In the second "Clone Saga" that began in 1994, Gwen's clone, Joyce, reappears. Now married to a clone of Professor Warren named Warren Miles, she sees a copy of Peter Parker's book of Spider-Man photos, and remembers (to an extent) her real history. She returns to New York City, but after helping Spider-Man and Scarlet Spider fight the Jackal, she again disappears from Spider-Man's life. She makes herself a new life in London. Another Gwen clone, who believes she is the original Gwen, appears in The Amazing Spider-Man #399 (March 1995). She dies from clone degeneration in Spider-Man #56 (March 1995), the next issue of the story arc.

=== 2000s ===
The story of Gwen Stacy was revisited in Spider-Man: Blue, by Jeph Loeb (2002-2003).

Beginning in 2000, Brian Michael Bendis wrote an alternate continuity for Spider-Man, updated for contemporary culture. An alternate version of Gwen Stacy appeared as a recurring character in Ultimate Spider-Man. She first appears in the Ultimate Marvel universe in Ultimate Spider-Man #15 (January 2002) as a teenage girl at Peter's high school. In this continuity, Gwen, whose rendition by artist Mark Bagley was inspired by an early-career Madonna, wears punk-style clothing, and harbors a rebellious personality. This version of Gwen dies in Ultimate Spider-Man #62 (July 2004), killed by Carnage. However, the Ultimate version of Gwen Stacy returns to life in Ultimate Spider-Man #98 (October 2006). According to Mark Bagley, "Gwen's return is integral to the Clone storyline and is basically a way to rock Peter's world...again". Gwen briefly transforms into a new version of Carnage, but she is restored to normal.

The story arc "Sins Past" (2004-2005) by J. Michael Straczynski apparently reveals that Gwen Stacy had an affair with Norman Osborn and fell pregnant with twins, a girl and a boy, to whom she gave birth while in France, and named Sarah and Gabriel Stacy, respectively. In this retcon, Gwen vowed to raise the twins with Peter Parker and refused to allow Norman access––an event which precipitated Norman's decision to kill her. By the time that Peter and his (then-considered-to-be) wife, Mary Jane Watson-Parker, discovered the twins' existence, they were grown to adult proportions, despite the relatively "short" time since Gwen's death, due to the genetic effects of their father's "goblin formula". Sarah and Gabriel revealed their existence to Peter after their father was publicly exposed as the Green Goblin, sending to Peter a page of an unsent letter from Gwen which revealed her pregnancy. When Peter as Spider-Man went to a genetics lab, where he intended to test Gwen's maternity of the twins, Sarah confronted him, and Spider-Man unmasked Sarah—finding her to be "a dead ringer for Gwen". Gwen Stacy herself, however, only appears in this story arc in flashback, as Mary Jane explained to Peter that she knew about Gwen's illegitimate offspring and Norman's paternity thereof because she overheard Gwen and Norman arguing over custody of the children, Sarah later signed up with Interpol, while Gabriel later become the Gray Goblin. The story was highly controversial for its implausibility and inconsistency with previously established characterization, and was eventually dispelled in the narrative continuity as a hoax.

=== 2010s ===
The alternative version of Gwen Stacy remained a recurring character throughout the Ultimate Spider-Man series, even following the death of Peter Parker in that continuity and the introduction of Miles Morales as the new Spider-Man, in Ultimate Comics: Spider-Man. The character disappeared with the end of the Ultimate universe in 2015.

In 2013, a new Gwen clone appears in the "Sibling Rivalry" crossover storyline between Superior Spider-Man Team-Up and Scarlet Spider. She joins the Jackal (alongside Carrion and a regular Miles Warren clone) in capturing Superior Spider-Man and Kaine. She is sympathetic towards "Peter" and Kaine, but at the same time utterly loyal to the Jackal. When the Spiders break free, Superior Spider-Man disarms and attempts to kill her, but is stopped by Kaine. When the Jackal's lab is engulfed in flames, Kaine offers to save her, but she refuses, and is seemingly consumed by the fire.

In 2015, Dan Slott and Jason Latour introduced a new version of Gwen Stacy, in which she would take on the role of Spider-Woman. The concept of an alternate-universe, spider-powered Gwen Stacy was first conceptualized by longtime Spider-Man writer Dan Slott for the "Spider-Verse" story arc. Slott had suggested "Gwen Stacy as a Spider-Woman" to Spider-Man editor Nick Lowe, who then approached Jason Latour to write a series based on that character. Latour was concerned about restoring Gwen Stacy to life in even an alternate-universe form, given the canonical consequences of her death more than 40 years earlier, but eventually conceded, and approached Robbi Rodriguez to design the character. Latour prompted Rodriguez to keep her mysterious and to avoid anything that would prematurely reveal her identity, saying that she "should feel like anyone could be under that mask." Slott previously had envisioned a costume based on her clothing in the two-part death story, "The Night Gwen Stacy Died" (1973), except red and blue with web patterns and a half mask. She would also have had a trench coat that would have been red with webs. Slott ultimately approved of Rodriquez' design. The character debuted in Edge of Spider-Verse #2 on September 17, 2014 and is commonly referred to as Spider-Gwen.

Latour's inspiration for creating the character came when he realized that he was not familiar with Gwen Stacy outside of being a "fridged" character who was killed for the sake of the hero as a plot progression. Latour also felt he grew up in times when white males were dominant in superhero comics, and saw Gwen Stacy as a potential hero to represent women in a better way, "The fact that it's a woman does change the meaning and subtext of everything that's going on. As a creator, that's really enjoyable and it opens up the story to go in a lot of directions it wouldn't have gone before."

The 2016–2017 crossover event "Dead No More: The Clone Conspiracy" written by Dan Slott and Christos Gage features Gwen Stacy reanimated by Ben Reilly before seemingly dying again. In the "Clone Conspiracy" storyline, a flashback revealed that Gwen Stacy was conscious during Spider-Man and Green Goblin's battle on the bridge, and before she died, she overheard their conversation and realized Peter was Spider-Man. She was angry at Peter for keeping this secret and for his involvement in her father's death. This flashback introduces contradictions with the version of the story established by Sins Past. The Green Goblin declares that Gwen "is just a pawn", contradicting the earlier motive of the 2004-2005 story, in which Osborn wanted to kill her to keep the twins with him and silence her forever.

In the present, Gwen (her soul intact) is revived by Ben Reilly (as the Jackal) in a clone body. Ben offers Gwen the opportunity to be his business partner as he tries to change the world with his new technology. Gwen is hesitant about this new life at first but accepts it when Ben shows that he has reanimated her father, who is in much better health than he was before he died. When Spider-Man arrives at the incorporation and discovers Ben's experiments, he is surprised by Gwen's presence and notes that unlike the other people Ben revived, Gwen does not trigger his spider sense, making him wonder if she was the real one. He is attacked by the "reborn" Doctor Octopus before he can question the issue further.

After Ben breaks up the fight and shows Spider-Man around the New U, George Stacy recognizes something off about Gwen's face and points his gun at her. It is revealed that this Gwen was actually her Earth-65 counterpart Spider-Woman who assists Spider-Man in escaping. The real Gwen is kidnapped by Kaine and taken to Parker Industries to be studied. Kaine reveals that he and Spider-Woman came to this Earth to assist Spider-Man because they saw that Spider-Man agreeing with Ben's offer on other worlds always results in a global disaster. Rhino and the second Electro are sent to retrieve Gwen after attacking the staff, but Gwen tells them to take Kaine with him too because his condition could help Ben's experiments. Anna Maria Marconi also volunteers to come with because she has studied both Kaine and the drug.

When Spider-Man is taken to Haven, he catches up with Gwen in the household in the facility, where she tries to convince him to support New U Technologies. Peter still has a hard time believing she is the real Gwen given his other experiences with clones. Gwen tries justifying her existence by telling Peter her memories, including how she overheard the Green Goblin talking to Spider-Man before her death. Peter thinks she died hating him, but Gwen said that she did not hate him, but rather died feeling betrayed. She tries kissing him, to no avail. Gwen witnesses Ben order his cloned villains to kill Spider-Man and decides to help Peter.

Doctor Octopus pulls a switch that activates the Carrion virus in all of the revived, including Gwen and George, and causes them to start rapidly decaying. After Gwen's father deteriorates in her arms, she assists Spider-Man by helping him get to the lab. When the cloned villains get to the lab doors, Gwen locks Spider-Man inside the lab and sacrifices herself via an explosion to give him more time. Following the Carrion virus being thwarted, Spider-Man and Anna check the building and see that Gwen has been reduced to dust. In the sequel ongoing series Ben Reilly: The Scarlet Spider, Death confirms that all clones Ben created of deceased people had their souls intact on being brought back, while clones of living people (like Ben himself) had unique souls of their own, making Gwen's revival by him a legitimate resurrection.

=== 2020s ===
A flashback solo miniseries following the character, Gwen Stacy, written by Gage and illustrated by Todd Nauck, was published in 2020, concluded with Giant-Size Gwen Stacy in 2022, and collected as Gwen Stacy: Beyond Amazing in 2024.

Nick Spencer retcons and erases the story of Gwen Stacy's affair with Norman Osborn, in his run on Amazing Spider-Man, during the "Sinister War" event (2021). Norman Osborn arrives at the safe house of Gabriel and Sarah in Paris, where an artificial intelligence back-up copy of his son Harry reveals to Norman that he never truly fathered the twins, and that he never had a sexual encounter with Gwen Stacy. The whole plan was to convince him he had the heirs he always wanted, so A.I. Harry hypnotized Norman and Mary Jane Watson with the help of Mysterio and the Chameleon, while Mendel Stromm created the mutated twins in a lab (this explains their rapid aging, as it is not truly related to Osborn's Goblin serum). Thus, this was all an elaborate scheme of Harry's to torment both his father and Peter.

In the A.X.E.: Judgment Day crossover event (2022), the Celestial known as the Progenitor is resurrected and gives humanity 24 hours to justify their existence and judges each human individually. The Progenitor appears to Peter in the form of Gwen, who watches him as he spends the day helping his friends and loved ones. The Progenitor deems Peter worthy and rewards him by briefly resurrecting the real Gwen to give them one last moment together. Norman Osborn witnesses their reunion, but brushes it aside as it is revealed the Progenitor also appeared to him as Gwen.

Gwen Stacy made her next return to Marvel Comics in the Gwenpool series by Cavan Scott and Stefano Nesi beginning May 2025 (collected as The All-New, All-Deadly Gwenpool in January 2026). Weapon X obtains the remains of New U's Gwen Stacy and restores her body, resurrecting her as the assassin Weapon X-31.

== Fictional character biography ==
In her initial appearances, Peter Parker met Gwen while both are studying as undergraduates at Empire State University, but with Aunt May in the hospital, Peter was troubled and ignores her advances. She dated both Flash Thompson and Harry Osborn to make Peter jealous. Gradually, however, a romance develops; Gwen, a science major, appreciated Peter's intellect. Gwen is gifted at biochemistry and is shown to have good investigative skills which she inherited from her father. Their relationship began almost immediately after Peter stops going out with Mary Jane Watson, whom he begins to see as shallow and self-absorbed. Gwen's father, George Stacy, is killed during a battle with Doctor Octopus. Gwen blames Spider-Man for his death and briefly leaves the country out of grief.

In The Amazing Spider-Man #121 ("The Night Gwen Stacy Died", June 1973), the Green Goblin kidnaps Gwen Stacy and throws her off a bridge (depicted as the Brooklyn Bridge but described in the text as the George Washington Bridge). Spider-Man shoots a web strand at Gwen's legs and catches her, but her neck is broken by the whiplash from her sudden stop.

In Superior Spider-Man #3, Peter briefly reunites with Gwen and her father in the afterlife, along with all his other lost loved ones, while in Doctor Octopus's failing body. Peter apologizes to them both for failing them but neither hold Peter accountable with Gwen even saying that “it worked out” because they were “together” and kissed him on the cheek.

Within the Marvel Comics, Gwen Stacy's death has enormous repercussions. Mary Jane Watson feels the loss of Gwen deeply and becomes a more mature, compassionate person. Gwen's death also draws Peter and Mary Jane into a closer friendship, and eventually to romance. Miles Warren, one of Gwen's professors, was secretly in love with her. Following her death, Warren goes insane and adopts the persona of the Jackal.

== Powers and abilities ==
Gwen Stacy is gifted at biochemistry and is shown to have good investigative skills which she inherited from her father. As Weapon X-31, she is given an accelerated healing process rendering her effectively immortal, referred to as her "healing factor", which regenerates damaged or destroyed tissues of her body far beyond that of normal humans, with adamantium fused onto her bones.

== Other versions ==
Many alternate universe versions of Gwen Stacy have appeared throughout the character's publication history.

=== Earth-617 ===
On Earth-617, Gwen Stacy became a detective after being inspired by Spider-Woman, another version of Gwen from a future alternate timeline. After this encounter, Gwen bonded to the Venom symbiote of her reality to become Spider-Woman. With the use of a Dimensional Travel Watch, she was able to travel across the multiverse and encountered other versions of herself; some of which who had also become Spider-Woman. With these Spider-Women, they formed the Council of Spider-Women.

=== Earth-3109 ===
In an alternate universe of Earth-3109 as depicted in Spider-Geddon, Gwen became the hero Green Goblin alongside Harry Osborn as Spider-Man.

=== Earth-14245 ===
On Earth-14245, Gwen Stacy operated as Green Goblin after taking the Goblin Formula. She was recruited by Madame Web to join the Sinister Squadron. In the miniseries Spider-Society, Green Goblin assisted the Sinister Squadron in pursuing the members of the Spider-Society. During the final battle, Green Goblin sacrificed her life to throw herself and Madame Web into the Web of Life and Destiny.

=== Heroes Reborn (2021) ===
In Heroes Reborn, Gwen trained by Nighthawk and became the vigilante Nightbird.

=== House of M ===
In House of M, Gwen survived and went on to marry Peter Parker.

=== Secret Wars ===
In Secret Wars: Battleworld, a version of Gwen with the powers of Wolverine called Gwenverine, was among the versions of Wolverine recruited by Mojo.

=== Spider-Gwen ===
In the alternate reality designated Earth-65, Gwen Stacy is the one bitten by the radioactive spider, and becomes a superhero going by the name of Spider-Woman. She is also a member of a band fronted by Mary Jane Watson, simply called the Mary Janes.

=== Spider-Man: Life Story ===
In Spider-Man: Life Story, Gwen is inadvertently killed when Harry Osborn destroys the tubes containing Jackal's clones. One year later, Jackal's clone of Gwen leaves New York alongside Peter's clone Ben to start a new life.

=== Ultimate Marvel ===
In the Ultimate Marvel universe, Gwen has an appearance inspired by Madonna and punk culture. The Ultimate Marvel version of Gwen is later killed by Carnage, but her consciousness survives inside the symbiote, allowing her to reconstitute her body. After a series of tests, it is concluded that Gwen is the original rather than a clone.

=== Ultimate Universe ===
In the Ultimate Universe series, Gwen is married to Harry Osborn and operates as Mysterio.

=== What If ===
Gwen Stacy has been featured in numerous "What If" stories:

- In "What if Gwen Stacy had lived?", Peter saves Gwen by jumping after her rather than catching her with a web-line. In doing this, he cushions her from the impact as they hit the water and subsequently gives her CPR. After regaining consciousness, Gwen sees him without his mask. After explaining himself to her, Peter proposes to Gwen, and she accepts. Meanwhile, the Green Goblin mails to J. Jonah Jameson proof of Spider-Man's real identity. On the day of Peter's wedding to Gwen, Jonah has published the expose and uses it to acquire a warrant for Peter's arrest. Peter escapes from the police moments after his wedding to Gwen, but the issue ends with Peter on the run from the law and pondering his uncertain future. As the issue ends, Gwen departs with Robbie Robertson, who promises Gwen they will do whatever they can to help Peter and quits the Bugle.
- In "What If Spider-Man Had Kept His Six Arms?", Spider-Man (whose six-arms mutation was permanent here) is able to prevent Gwen Stacy's death.
- At the very end of Peter David's one-shot "What If: The Other", Peter Parker (now calling himself "Poison") uses part of the Venom symbiote attached to him to resurrect Gwen Stacy. She takes the appearance of Carnage.
- In "What if Peter Parker became the Punisher?", Peter (who is the Punisher in this continuity) is able to save Gwen by killing the Green Goblin and webbing her body to a suspended scaffold on the bridge. Feeling guilty over almost getting her killed, he quits being the Punisher to be with her. She later marries Peter and helps him get rid of the Venom symbiote before revealing she's pregnant.
- In What If...Dark?: Spider-Gwen, Peter saves Gwen by jumping after her, but is killed when the Green Goblin cuts his web line and causes him to break his neck on a bridge pillar before his body cushions Gwen's fall. Upon discovering his secret, Gwen protects Peter's identity by discarding his costume and claiming Goblin took them both hostage at random. She subsequently dons Spider-Man's spare costume and vows revenge against the Goblin. She works together with Harry to trap the villain, but refuses to kill him as she realizes doing so would not be what Peter wanted. Harry does choose to kill him, but is horrified when he discovers the Goblin was his father. Blaming Gwen for Norman's death, Harry becomes the new Green Goblin while Gwen promises Peter she will resolve her mistakes as the new Spider-Woman despite being powerless.

== In other media ==
=== Television ===
- An alternate universe version of Gwen Stacy appears in the Spider-Man: The Animated Series two-part series finale "Spider Wars", voiced by Mary Kay Bergman. This version is the fiancée of an alternate universe version of Spider-Man who became a rich industrialist.
- Gwen Stacy appears in The Spectacular Spider-Man, voiced by Lacey Chabert. This version is a teenager and friend of Peter Parker and Harry Osborn who has hidden romantic feelings for the former, expressing hurt whenever he expresses interest in other girls. Throughout the first season, she becomes concerned when Harry becomes addicted to the drug Gobulin Green and kisses Parker, leaving them in an awkward standing in the second season. Despite their feelings for each other, Parker begins dating Liz Allan while Stacy dates Harry. In the series finale, she and Parker acknowledge their feelings for each other and agree to break up with Harry and Allan. Following Norman Osborn's apparent death, Stacy stays with Harry to care for him.

=== Film ===
==== Sam Raimi series ====
- A student in Peter Parker's university class from Spider-Man 2, portrayed by an uncredited extra, is identified as Gwen Stacy in the film's novelization.
- Gwen Stacy appears in Spider-Man 3, portrayed by Bryce Dallas Howard. This version is a model, classmate, and lab partner of Peter's, and Eddie Brock's ex-girlfriend. After Spider-Man rescues Gwen, he urges her to kiss him during a public ceremony, upsetting his girlfriend, Mary Jane Watson. After breaking up with Eddie, Gwen goes on a date with a symbiote-influenced Peter, only to realize he was trying to make Watson jealous. Upset, Gwen apologizes to Mary Jane and leaves Peter. Later, Eddie becomes Venom and targets Parker in revenge for ruining his life.

==== Marc Webb series ====
- Emma Stone portrays Gwen Stacy in The Amazing Spider-Man and its sequel The Amazing Spider-Man 2. This version serves as Peter Parker's love interest, classmate, and character foil. Additionally, she works at Oscorp as an assistant to Dr. Curt Connors. After falling in love in the first film, the second film sees Parker and Stacy going through an on-and-off relationship before she is killed by the Green Goblin.
- In an interview with Screen Rant, Stone expressed interest in returning as a resurrected Stacy in a future The Amazing Spider-Man film, despite the character's death at the end of The Amazing Spider-Man 2. However, by July 2014, development on the follow-up films Sinister Six, The Amazing Spider-Man 3, and The Amazing Spider-Man 4 had stalled. The films would have seen Stone reprise her role, with the plot following Norman Osborn setting a resurrected amnesiac Stacy as Carnage against Parker, Harry, and the Sinister Six. By early 2015, a deal to reboot the series within the Marvel Cinematic Universe was reached, cancelling The Amazing Spider-Man franchise.
- In both films, Kari Coleman, Charlie DePew, Skyler Gisondo, and Jacob Rodier portray members of the Stacy family: Gwen's mother Helen Stacy and Gwen's younger brothers Philip, Howard, and Simon Stacy respectively.

=== Video games ===
- Gwen Stacy appears in The Amazing Spider-Man film tie-in game, voiced by Kari Wahlgren.
- Gwen Stacy appears as a playable character in Lego Marvel Super Heroes, voiced again by Kari Wahlgren.

=== Miscellaneous ===
- Gwen Stacy appears in the Spider-Man Unlimited tie-in comic.
- Paige Embry, a character based on Gwen Stacy, appears in the novel The Refrigerator Monologues as the unofficial leader of the Hell Hath Club, a group of women in the afterlife trying to cope with the brutal termination of their plot lines, and provides connecting narration for each of their stories. Embry was the girlfriend of Tom Thatcher/Kid Mercury and was unceremoniously killed during a fight between him and Dr. Noucture (in a manner referencing the aspiration of her death in The Amazing Spider-Man 2). The novel's author Catherynne Valente said of how her anger at the depiction of Gwen's death in the film inspiring the novel's plot:

[I]t blindsided me in a way that Gwen Stacy taking her dive should never blindside anyone born after 1970, and it was a sucker punch, because more or less the last thing Emma Stone [as Gwen Stacy] does before she quite literally flounces off to meet her doom is snit, "Nobody makes my decisions for me, nobody! This is my choice. Mine." … [S]omeone chose to give her those words. … To make those powerful words the punchline to a sad joke about female agency by punishing her for them, by making sure that no matter how modern and independent the new Gwen might seem, everything is just as it has always been. That old, familiar message slides into our brains with the warm familiarity of a father’s hug: when women make their own choices, disaster results.

== Legacy ==
Gwen Stacy was an American metalcore band from Indianapolis, Indiana, active between 2004 and 2010, whose name came from the comic book character Gwen Stacy. The band announced a reunion in April 2014.

Due to the popularity of Spider-Gwen, an alternate reality version of Gwen as Spider-Woman introduced in Edge of Spider-Verse in September 2014, in June 2015 Marvel published variant covers for 20 of their current series, which saw Gwen Stacy re-imagined as other Marvel characters, such as Doctor Strange, Groot, and Wolverine. One of those variants, for Deadpool's Secret Secret Wars #2, featured an amalgam of the design of Gwen Stacy and Deadpool dubbed "Gwenpool", who became especially popular with fans. As a result, Marvel produced two stories featuring Gwenpool as an original character, a backup story in the series Howard the Duck, and a one-shot, Gwenpool Holiday Special. Howard the Duck establishes the character to be Gwen Poole, a fangirl from an analogue of the real world who is transported to the Marvel Universe. Following the publication of the one-shot, an ongoing series titled The Unbelievable Gwenpool by the same creative team (Christopher Hastings and Gurihiru) was announced, starting in April 2016, with a webtoon spin-off, It's Jeff!, premiering in September 2021.
