= Mendel Stromm =

Marvel Comics supervillain

Professor Mendel Stromm
- Mendel Stromm as depicted in Civil War II: Amazing Spider-Man #3 (August 2016). Art by Travel Foreman.

Publication information
- Publisher: Marvel Comics
- First appearance: The Amazing Spider-Man #37 (June 1966)
- Created by: Stan Lee (writer); Steve Ditko (artist)

In-story information
- Species: Human cyborg
- Team affiliations: Oscorp; Empire State University
- Notable aliases: Robot Master; Gaunt
- Abilities: Genius-level intellect; Cybernetic enhancement grants: Superhuman strength, durability, and athleticism; Regeneration; Technopathy

Professor Mendel Stromm is a supervillain appearing in American comic books published by Marvel Comics. The character has also been known as the Robot Master and Gaunt. Primarily an enemy of Spider-Man, Stromm initially appeared as an assistant to Norman Osborn and contributed to the formula that transformed Osborn into the Green Goblin. After his apparent death, Stromm was converted into a cyborg.

== Publication history ==
Stromm first appeared in The Amazing Spider-Man #37 (June 1966), and was created by Stan Lee and Steve Ditko.

== Fictional character biography ==
In his first appearance, Mendel Stromm watches as Spider-Man battles two of his robots. From The Amazing Spider-Man #37.

Professor Mendel Stromm is Norman Osborn's college professor at Empire State University and later becomes a partner in Oscorp Industries. His early research is on a chemical that would provide enhanced strength in its test subjects and would eventually turn Osborn into the Green Goblin. Osborn, wanting the formula for himself, discovers that Stromm had been embezzling funds from Oscorp. Stromm explains that he is merely borrowing the funds, but Osborn turns him over to the police. After several years in prison, Stromm is released and tries to kill Osborn for revenge using deadly robots. He is stopped by Spider-Man and seemingly dies of a heart attack when he is nearly shot.

Stromm survives by transferring his consciousness into a robotic double. In Spectacular Spider-Man #233 (1996), Stromm returns as a cyborg called Gaunt. Osborn had discovered that Stromm had survived his heart attack thanks to the Goblin Formula, but on a level of consciousness supported only by his suit. Eventually, Stromm is cured of his need for the suit.

Stromm tries to create a sentient robot to kill Osborn, but it turns on him and destroys his body, keeping his severed head alive. The artificial intelligence attempts to take over New York City's electrical grid, but is stopped when Spider-Man fights his way into the robot's core processor and uploads a virus into it, rendering the A.I. and Stromm comatose. Spider-Man tells S.H.I.E.L.D. Stromm's whereabouts, allowing them to rescue him.

Stromm obtains a Tri-Sentinel from the bunker of the bankrupt Life Foundation, which proceeds to battle an Isotope Genome Accelerator duplicate of Spider-Man. After the Tri-Sentinel is defeated, Stromm is approached by Kindred, who gives him a Master Mold that specializes in creating Tri-Sentinels. After Spider-Man defeats the Tri-Sentinels, Stromm is confronted by Kindred, who states that his usefulness has ended and kills him.

== In other media ==
=== Television ===
Wardell Stromm appears in the Spider-Man: The Animated Series episode "Enter the Green Goblin", voiced by Philip Abbott. He is Norman Osborn's assistant and one of the few who knows of Oscorp's connections to the Kingpin.

=== Film ===
- Mendel Stromm appears in Spider-Man (2002), portrayed by Ron Perkins. This version is a scientist employed by Oscorp to develop human performance enhancers, though he expresses doubts in their effectiveness due to their test mice demonstrating violent insanity. After being driven insane by the serum, Norman Osborn kills Stromm.
- A parody of Mendel Stromm, named Dr. Strom, appears in Superhero Movie, portrayed by Brent Spiner.

=== Video games ===
- Mendel Stromm appears in the Spider-Man (2002) tie-in game, voiced by Peter Lurie.
- Mendel Stromm appears in The Amazing Spider-Man, voiced by Fred Tatasciore. This version is an Oscorp scientist who helped create experimental hybrid creatures.
