= Green Goblin =

Marvel Comics supervillain

- Norman Osborn as the Green Goblin. Art by Miguel Mercado.

Publication information
- Publisher: Marvel Comics
- First appearance: The Amazing Spider-Man #14 (July 1964)
- Created by: Stan Lee; Steve Ditko

In-story information
- Full name: Norman Osborn; Harry Osborn; Bart Hamilton; Phil Urich
- Species: Mutated human
- Team affiliations: Doctor Bat and man
- Notable aliases: Green Goblin; Goblin King; Goblin Knight; Red Goblin; Gold Goblin
- Abilities: Superhuman strength, intelligence, speed, stamina, agility, durability, reflexes, and healing; Uses Halloween-themed paraphernalia, high-tech gadgetry, and a Goblin Glider equipped with various weapons

The Green Goblin is the alias of several supervillains appearing in American comic books published by Marvel Comics. Created by writer Stan Lee and artist Steve Ditko, the first and best-known incarnation of Green Goblin is Norman Osborn. He has endured as one of Spider-Man's principal archenemies, alongside Doctor Octopus and Venom. Originally a manifestation of chemically induced insanity, others would later take on the persona, including Norman's son Harry Osborn. The Green Goblin is depicted as a criminal mastermind who uses an arsenal of Halloween-themed equipment, including grenade-like Pumpkin Bombs, razor-sharp bat-shaped blades, and a flying Goblin Glider, to terrorize New York City.

Comics journalist and historian Mike Conroy writes of the character: "Of all the costumed villains who've plagued Spider-Man over the years, the most flat-out unhinged and terrifying of them all is the Green Goblin." The Green Goblin has appeared in numerous media adaptations of Spider-Man over the years, including films, animated television series, and video games. Norman and Harry Osborn were portrayed by Willem Dafoe and James Franco in Sam Raimi's Spider-Man film trilogy (2002–2007), and by Chris Cooper and Dane DeHaan in the film The Amazing Spider-Man 2 (2014). Dafoe reprised his role as Norman Osborn in the Marvel Cinematic Universe (MCU) film Spider-Man: No Way Home (2021) which used the concept of the multiverse to link the Raimi trilogy to the MCU.

== Publication history ==
According to Steve Ditko:

Stan's synopsis for the Green Goblin had a movie crew, on location, finding an Egyptian–like sarcophagus. Inside was an ancient, mythological demon, the Green Goblin. He naturally came to life. On my own, I changed Stan's mythological demon into a human villain.

The Green Goblin debuted in The Amazing Spider-Man #14. At this time his identity was unknown, but he proved popular and reappeared in later issues, which made a point of his secret identity. According to both Stan Lee and John Romita, Sr., who replaced Ditko as the title's artist, Lee always wanted the Green Goblin to be someone Peter Parker knew, while Ditko wanted his civilian identity to be someone who had not yet been introduced. Lee elaborated:

Steve wanted him to turn out to be just some character that we had never seen before. Because, he said, in real life, very often a villain turns out to be somebody that you never knew. And I felt that that would be wrong. I felt, in a sense, it would be like cheating the reader. ... if it's somebody you didn't know and had never seen, then what was the point of following all the clues? I think that frustrates the reader.

However, Lee prefaced this statement by admitting that, due to his self-professed poor memory, he may have been confusing the Green Goblin with a different character. (Note: It is possible that Lee was thinking of the Big Man. The Big Man was a mob villain who, like the Green Goblin, was created by Lee/Ditko and had the mystery of his identity played up before being unmasked as someone Spider-Man knew from his civilian life. Moreover, later in the interview Lee suggests that he had the Green Goblin confused with "a gangster".) Moreover, in an earlier essay he had said that he could not remember whether Norman Osborn being the Green Goblin was his idea or Ditko's. Ditko has maintained that it was his idea, even claiming that he had decided on it before the first Green Goblin story was finished, and that a character he drew in the background of a single panel of Amazing Spider-Man #23 was meant to be Norman Osborn (who is not introduced until issue #37).

The Amazing Spider-Man #14 (July 1964), the Green Goblin's first appearance; the character originally used a turbo-fan-powered "flying broomstick". Cover art by Steve Ditko.

Ditko left the series with issue #38, just one issue after Norman Osborn was introduced as the father of Harry Osborn. The first issue without Ditko saw the Green Goblin unmasked. John Romita, Sr., who replaced Ditko as the title's artist, recalled:

Stan wouldn't have been able to stand it if Ditko did the story and didn't reveal that the Green Goblin was Norman Osborn. I didn't know there was any doubt about Osborn being the Goblin. I didn't know that Ditko had just been setting Osborn up as a straw dog. I just accepted the fact that it was going to be Norman Osborn when we plotted it. I had been following the last couple of issues and didn't think there was really much mystery about it. Looking back, I doubt the Goblin's identity would have been revealed in Amazing #39 if Ditko had stayed on.

In the landmark story, "The Night Gwen Stacy Died" (The Amazing Spider-Man #121–122), the Green Goblin kills Gwen Stacy and later perishes in a fight against Spider-Man. However, the story's writer, Gerry Conway, had Harry Osborn adopt the Green Goblin identity in that story's aftermath, later remarking that "I never had any intention of getting rid of the Green Goblin as a concept". Harry Osborn's becoming the Green Goblin was mostly well-received, with fans remarking that Harry was more menacing than his father had ever been.

Several other characters would take on the Green Goblin identity, and writer Roger Stern later introduced the Hobgoblin to replace the Green Goblin as Spider-Man's archenemy. In addition, a retcon during the "Clone Saga" determined that the original Green Goblin survived the events of The Amazing Spider-Man #122 and had been playing a behind-the-scenes role in Spider-Man's adventures since then.

== Fictional character biography ==
=== Norman Osborn ===
Norman Osborn is the first and most-known version of Green Goblin. He developed the equipment used by the other Green Goblins.

=== Harry Osborn ===
Harold "Harry" Osborn is Norman Osborn's son and the second character who used the Green Goblin alias.

=== Bart Hamilton ===
Bart Hamilton is a psychologist born in Scarsdale, New York and the third character to use the Green Goblin alias. When Harry was put under medical care, Hamilton managed to make Harry bury the vendetta as the Goblin identity from Harry's subconscious via hypnosis. Hamilton uses these secrets to be the third Goblin. Since Harry has no knowledge of where Norman's strength-enhancing Goblin formula is, Hamilton is unable to locate it. He hatches an elaborate plot to kill Silvermane but Harry resumes the Goblin identity to stop him. They battle and Hamilton is accidentally killed by a bomb with which he meant to kill Spider-Man.

=== Phil Urich ===
Phil Urich is the nephew of Ben Urich and the fourth character to use the Green Goblin alias.

=== Nameless construct ===
Norman Osborn conspires with associate Doctor Angst to genetically engineer a new Green Goblin, one devoted to his case. After Norman is incapacitated by the Gathering of Five, the Goblin is left alone and begins to degenerate due to no longer having access to the Goblin Formula required to keep him stable. The Goblin goes after Liz Allan in a desperate bid to find a cure for his condition, but is driven off by Spider-Man. During a second attempt to capture Liz, the Goblin unmasks himself in front of Spider-Man and melts into protoplasm.

== Powers and abilities ==
In his first appearances, the Green Goblin seems to be a normal man (albeit very nimble and athletic) who gets his powers from his many gadgets. In later appearances, it is established that due to the "Goblin Formula", Norman and most successors to the Green Goblin persona possesses superhuman strength (lifting nine tons under optimal conditions), increased speed, reflexes, endurance, intelligence and healing rate.

Norman started with a portion of the chemical's power, because he only received an accidental splash in the face at a time when one had to bathe in it long enough to get the full effect. Eventually a new version of the chemical was developed, which was suitable for directly drinking it. Though much slower than the likes of Wolverine, he can regenerate damaged tissue and organs. However, if seriously wounded, it would leave scars on his body.

His intelligence has been enhanced to gifted levels, though at the price of his sanity. His involvement with the Gathering of the Five loosened his grip on reality, though he is able to maintain some semblance of his sanity via chemically treated dermal patches. When not impaired by mental illness, Osborn is a cunning businessman, masterful strategist, and highly skilled in electronics, mechanics, engineering and chemistry.

He wears a green bulletproof scale armor costume with an overlapping purple tunic. His mask has a built-in gas filter to keep him safe from his own gases, and his gloves are woven with micro-circuited filaments which channel pulsed discharges of electricity at nearly 10,000 volts.

=== Goblin Glider ===
In the Green Goblin's first appearance in The Amazing Spider-Man #14, he rides a steel rocket-powered wingless broomstick. In his second appearance in The Amazing Spider-Man #17, he changes to the familiar bat-shaped glider. The Goblin Glider's controls and microprocessor are located behind the head of the glider. The pilot is attached to the glider via electromagnetic clasps on the wings of the glider. It has great maneuverability and is steered mostly by leaning, but manual controls are available behind the head of the glider. The Goblin later added radio-linked voice controls to his mask.

Its top speed is 90 miles per hour (140 km/h), and it can support about 400 lb (180 kg), though it could lift far more for brief periods. Flying at top speed with a full load and a full fuel tank would deplete its fuel supply in about an hour. In the Goblin's later appearances, the glider possesses a wide array of armaments, including heat-seeking and smart missiles, machine guns, extending blades, a flamethrower and a Pumpkin Bomb dispenser/launcher.

=== Pumpkin Bombs, Ghost Bombs, and the "Bag of Tricks" ===
The Green Goblin wears an over-the-shoulder satchel called his "Bag of Tricks", containing various weapons including grenades called "Pumpkin Bombs", which resemble miniature Jack-o'-lanterns. When thrown, they ignite almost soundlessly and produce enough heat to melt through a 3-inch (76 mm) thick sheet of steel. Other weapons in the satchel include razor bats (akin to bladed boomerangs) and miniature "Ghost Bombs". The Green Goblin has a range of other "Pumpkin Bombs" and "Ghost Bombs" at his disposal, including smoke and gas-emitting bombs. Some release hallucinogenic gases, while others emit a specially created mixture that neutralises Spider-Man's spider-sense for a limited period of time. Still others emit a flame-retarding gas, which the Goblin once used against the Human Torch. All of these are covered in a light plastic coating.

== Groups ==
=== Goblinettes ===
Some time after Norman's death, Harry is abducted by a trio of mysterious female Goblins. With the aid of Ben Urich and Molten Man, Spider-Man discovers that these "Goblinettes" are robots created by Harry, and controlled by a supercomputer containing copies of Harry and Norman's minds. The Goblinettes are destroyed along with the computer, which had been programmed to expose Normie Osborn to the same version of Goblin serum that killed Harry, in attempt to create a new Green Goblin.

=== Order of the Goblin ===
An offshoot of the Scriers cult founded by Norman, consisting of only his most loyal followers.

=== Goblin Gangs ===
Following Norman Osborn's rise and fall from power, a number of Goblin Gangs sprang up across America. Composed mostly of white supremacists who agreed with his plans to remove the Asgardians from the country, they wear purple clothes, green face makeup and have goblin-based tattoos. Vin Gonzales was revealed to have received one of these tattoos while in prison passing a message from Norman to Harry about Stanley Osborn.

=== War Goblins ===
In the eight-month ellipsis that occurred subsequent to the events of Secret Wars, a heavily bandaged arms dealer claiming to be Norman Osborn began selling Goblin-based costumes and equipment on the black market, establishing private armies of "War Goblins".

== Other versions ==
=== Avataars: Covenant of the Shield ===
The Goblin King, a character based on the Green Goblin, appears in Avataars: Covenant of the Shield. This version is a goblin who speaks in rhyme and runs a toll booth in the Webwood. He extorts goods from travelers along with his henchmen, the Six Most Sinister.

=== Earth-6160 ===
In the Ultimate Universe (Earth-6160), Harry Osborn operates as Green Goblin.

=== House of M ===
In the storyline House of M, there are two versions of the Green Goblin.

- The first is Crusher Hogan, who uses the Green Goblin identity in wrestling.
- The second is Peter Parker, who pretends to be a mutant to fit in with the mutant-dominated society. Peter later poses as the Green Goblin to publicly reveal that he is not a mutant.

=== Marvel 2099 ===
In the Marvel 2099 setting, there are several versions of Green Goblin.

==== Unidentified shapeshifter ====
The Goblin is a radical trickster who wants to prove that Spider-Man (Miguel O'Hara) is in the pay of a megacorp like Alchemax. He has bat-like glider-wings and a bag of "tricks", similar to the 20th century version. He also has the ability to project illusions. The Goblin is eventually unmasked, and appears to be Spider-Man's brother Gabriel O'Hara, although it is later revealed, in a retcon, that he is a shapeshifter who took Gabriel's identity. Writer Peter David, who quit the book between creating the character and the unmasking, stated that he intended the Goblin to be a female Catholic priest named Father Jennifer and for Gabriel to be a red herring.

==== Jennifer D'Angelo ====
Jennifer D'Angelo is an ordained priest in each of the 2099 realities.

===== Earth-928 =====
On Earth-928, Jennifer D'Angelo is an ordained priest. She later took on the alias of Goblin 2099 to fight Spider-Man and later allied with Vulture.

===== Unidentified 2099 reality =====
In All-New, All-Different Marvel during a travel to 2099 which turned out to be different from the version that he knows, Spider-Man (O'Hara) is captured by that alternate 2099's era's Venom and Doctor Octopus. Miguel later wakes up in Alchemax, which is run by that era's Sinister Six. The Sinister Six discover that the Goblin is actually Jennifer D'Angelo, an undercover ally of Kasey. After receiving a message from the Sinister Six, Miguel and Kasey go to Alchemax to rescue Jennifer. Upon escaping, Spider-Man and Jennifer arrive at an area where the time door appears, where Jennifer is killed by Doctor Octopus.

=== MC2 ===
Several versions of Green Goblin appear in the Marvel Comics 2 (MC2) imprint.

==== Fury the Goblin Queen ====
Élan DeJunae, daughter of the San Mardeo DeJunae crime family in South America, is betrothed to Normie Osborn as a baby because of her father's involvement with the Order of the Goblin. Élan grows up training to follow Norman Osborn's footsteps, and eventually becomes the leader of the Order of the Goblin.

In the series Spider-Society, Fury appears as a member of the Sinister Squadron.

==== Phil Urich ====
In the MC2 timeline, Phil Urich marries his girlfriend Meredith and is a forensic scientist and friends with Peter Parker. He is aware of both Peter and Spider-Girl's identities. Phil Urich resumes the Goblin identity, first under the name of the Golden Goblin, then as the Green Goblin with the assistance of Normie Osborn. After Phil lost a long series of battles, Normie recreates Phil's original mask, which grants him superhuman strength and other abilities, greatly enhancing his effectiveness. He is also a founding member of the New New Warriors.

=== Spider-Ham ===
In the universe where Marvel characters are animals, Norman Osbird is a crazy turkey who calls himself the Green Gobbler.

=== Spider-Man: India ===
Spider-Man: India features Nalin Oberoi, a ruthless businessman in Mumbai, who is ravaging villages for a mystical amulet to connect with evil, supernatural demons who once ruled the world. The process works and transforms Oberoi into "Green Goblin". He also transforms a meek doctor into Doctor Octopus and sends him to find Pavitr Prabhakar (Spider-Man).

=== Marvel Zombies ===
In the Marvel Zombies universe, a zombified Green Goblin appears attacking Galactus alongside several other undead supervillains, before being defeated and destroyed by Spider-Man. Prior to this, in Marvel Zombies: Dead Days, Green Goblin, alongside several other undead Spider-Man villains, appears to attack Wolverine.
