= The Physics of Superheroes =

Book by James Kakalios

- Author: James Kakalios
- Language: English
- Subject: Physics and Superhero comics
- Genre: Non-fiction
- Publisher: Gotham Books
- Publication date: 2005
- Publication place: United States
- Media type: Print (Hardcover)
- Pages: 365
- ISBN: 1-59240-242-9
- OCLC: 71789063

The Physics of Superheroes is a popular science book by physics professor and long-time comic-book fan James Kakalios. First published in 2005, it explores the basic laws of physics. Kakalios does not set out to show where the world of superheroes contradicts modern science, granting the heroes one or more "miracle exceptions" from natural law. Instead, he focuses on examples of comic book scenes that can be used to understand the diverse laws of physics from an unusual angle, such as Gwen Stacy's death and Ant-Man's ability to punch his way out of a paper bag. Kakalios relates these elements of comic books to principles of physics, such as levers and torque, and in this way covers diverse topics, from mechanics to the quantum world.

== See also ==
- The Physics of Star Trek
