= Sinister War =

Marvel Comics comic book storyline

- Publisher: Marvel Comics
- Publication date: July – September 2021
- Genre: Superhero
Title(s)
The Amazing Spider-Man Vol. 5 #71–73, Sinister War #1–4
- Main character(s): Spider-Man; Kindred; Doctor Octopus; Sinister Six; Vulture; Savage Six; Mary Jane Watson; Norman Osborn; Boomerang; Sinister Syndicate; Mephisto; Doctor Strange

Creative team
- Writer: Nick Spencer
- Artist(s): Mark Bagley; Federico Vicenti

"Sinister War" is a 2021 comic book storyline published by Marvel Comics, starring the character Spider-Man and written by Nick Spencer. The story deals with Spider-Man being in the middle of a conflict between multiple teams of villains, including the Sinister Six and Savage Six, orchestrated by Kindred.

== Plot ==
In Las Vegas, Doctor Strange talks with Mephisto over his part in corrupting Peter Parker's soul. Peter is planning to propose to Mary Jane Watson, but the Savage Six take the opportunity to attack. Mysterio comes to Mary Jane's rescue, exposing his identity to Peter and the Savage Six. Doctor Octopus then attacks the theater with Electro, Kraven the Hunter, Lizard, and Sandman. Mysterio tries to tell Peter that he and Mary Jane's deal with Mephisto is to blame for everything that is presently happening, but Peter is far too distracted by the warring factions. Doctor Octopus offers Mysterio the opportunity to join the Sinister Six as long as he helps them capture Mary Jane. Mysterio complies and teleports away taking Mary Jane with him. Peter is knocked out by Octavius and awakens in Kindred's lair, where the demon again tortures and taunts him using mirrors containing Mary Jane, Mysterio, and a brutalized Norman Osborn.

Prisoners of Kindred, Carlie Cooper tries to give Harry Lyman a motivational speech, reminding him of his family. Harry tells her this is not the first time he has failed them and that no matter how happy he is, how hard he tries to put things right, something is always there to remind him that none of it is real and that none of it will ever last. After more coaxing from Carlie, Harry suddenly notices that the door to their cell is open and suggests there is a way to escape.

Foreigner's group, the Superior Foes, and the Sinister Syndicate find themselves before Kindred. When Taskmaster tries to attack, Kindred causes Taskmaster pain and reveals that he placed centipedes in their heads while they were sleeping. He challenges the villains to kill Spider-Man in order to punish him for his sins as if their "afterlife" depends on it.

Peter fends off the Sinister Six until Doctor Octopus snares him with his tentacles. Peter attempts to appeal to Doctor Octopus' better nature, telling him he is not like this anymore. Doctor Octopus briefly hesitates, but mounting pressure from the rest of the Sinister Six compels him to act though this buys Peter enough time to break free. The Savage Six then attack the Sinister Six, giving Peter time to escape. Boomerang also has a change of heart and helps Peter escape as all of the assembled teams brawl for the right to claim Spider-Man's life. Kindred revives Sin-Eater, who is still angered at Kindred for forsaking him.

Through a series of flashbacks, it is revealed that Harry Osborn's entire life had been defined by a deal his father struck with Mephisto. Over in Europe, Norman discovers a hidden lab housing two cloning pods and an A.I. taking the form of his son. The A.I. explains that being a survivor, he uploaded his brain waves into this machine just so he could taunt his father from the grave. (Note: As depicted in Spider-Man: Legacy of Evil #1) Meanwhile, Harry Lyman and Carlie discover that Carlie's morgue is housed within Kindred's lair and Harry discovers his own body. Kindred admits to Mary Jane he has not been entirely honest with her and is not who she believes him to be. It is time she learned the truth, no matter the cost, and unmasks to reveal a face that shocks Mary Jane.

Spider-Man is cornered by Morlun, who prepares to feast on him before Boomerang saves Spider-Man in the nick of time. Morlun turns on Boomerang and drains him of his life essence. Doctor Octopus activates a transducer and disables the centipedes, knocking out everyone except himself and Spider-Man. Meanwhile in Las Vegas, Mephisto's game of chance ends in a loss for him.

Peter is transported to Paris, where he is beaten by Kindred. Elsewhere at Mysterio's studio, Kindred is revealed to be Sarah Stacy, who for many years was believed to be one of Gwen and Norman's children. It is revealed that Sarah and her brother Gabriel were clones of Gwen and Harry himself created in a lab as part of a conspiracy he orchestrated to toy with Peter and Norman. Elsewhere in Las Vegas, Doctor Strange asks Mephisto to stop playing games, with Mephisto offering him one final wager: the virtue of a hero against the corruption of a soul.

The wager is for the soul of the original Harry Osborn, who is influencing the Kindred twins, with Sarah being the Kindred confronting Mary Jane and Gabriel being the Kindred tormenting Peter. Their souls were tortured by Mephisto each time they died, corrupted, and twisted into his demonic lackeys alongside the Harry Osborn A.I. that Mephisto had controlled from the beginning. Harry Lyman reveals to Carlie that he is also a clone of Harry Osborn. Equipping himself with a goblin glider and pumpkin bombs, Harry helps Peter, Norman, and Mary Jane battle the Kindred Twins, but is eventually killed. After Mary Jane saves Peter's life, their show of love defeats the Kindred twins, who are released from Mephisto's control before dying.

== Critical reception ==
On Comic Book Roundup, the series received an average score of 7.2 out of 10 based on 39 reviews.

On Comic Book Roundup, Amazing Spider-Man: What Cost Victory received an average score of 6.8 out of 10 based on 32 reviews.

== Collected editions ==
Title	Material collected	Published date	ISBN
Sinister War	Sinister War #1–4	January 2022	978-1846533358
Amazing Spider-Man by Nick Spencer Vol. 15: What Cost Victory?	The Amazing Spider-Man (vol. 5) #70–74	November 2021	978-1302926083
Amazing Spider-Man by Nick Spencer Omnibus Vol. 2	The Amazing Spider-Man (vol. 5) #44–73, #74 (A–B Stories), #50.LR–54.LR, The Amazing Spider-Man: Sins Rising Prelude, The Amazing Spider-Man: The Sins of Norman Osborn, Giant-Size Amazing Spider-Man: King's Ransom, Giant-Size Amazing Spider-Man: Chameleon Conspiracy, Sinister War #1–4	June 2024	978-1302953645
