= Carlie Cooper =

- Carlie Cooper. Art by Steve McNiven.

Publication information
- Publisher: Marvel Comics
- First appearance: The Amazing Spider-Man #545 (Dec. 2007)
- Created by: Dan Slott (writer); Joe Quesada (artist)

In-story information
- Full name: Carlie Ellen Cooper
- Team affiliations: NYPD Crime Scene Unit
- Supporting character of: Spider-Man
- Notable aliases: Monster
- Abilities: As Carlie Cooper: Forensics expert As Monster: Superhuman strength, speed and stamina

Carlie Cooper is a comic book character appearing in American comic books published by Marvel Comics. The character is named after Joe Quesada's daughter. She is friends with Peter Parker, Harry Osborn, Vin Gonzales, and Lily Hollister. She is one of Spider-Man's first potential romantic interests in the "One More Day" story arc and eventually is a girlfriend for a time.

== Publication history ==
Carlie Cooper was created by writer Dan Slott and aritst/eidtor Joe Quesada. She made her first appeared in The Amazing Spider-Man #545 (December 2007), which was part of the "Brand New Day" storyline.

== Fictional character biography ==
=== "Brand New Day" ===
Carlie Cooper is the roommate and best friend of Lily Hollister; the two grew up together but Carlie was the brighter of the two. As a child, she was also friends with Gwen Stacy. She is an officer of the New York Police Department's Crime Scene Unit. She campaigned vigorously for Bill Hollister, whom she considers a father figure. Her birth father Ray Cooper was a well-respected cop who reportedly died years earlier.

While preparing a body found in the river for the medical examiner, Carlie finds a spider-tracer in the corpse's mouth, which initiates the police warrant for the "Spider-Tracer Killer". She later discovers that the "Spider-Tracer Killer" is a conspiracy by a group of New York cops who have planted the tracers on dead bodies to frame Spider-Man in an attempt to turn the public against. Carlie informs the precinct's sergeant, who is secretly a part of the conspiracy and issues a warrant for her arrest, claiming that she is aiding and abetting the killer. She goes to the Hollisters and tells the truth of the tracer killings. She escapes the police with the help of Menace. Later, Vin Gonzales finds her and apologizes to her for all that was done to her.

It is discovered that Carlie's father did not die. When Carlie learns that Ray was not the good cop the man was made out to be, she has her father arrested. She then cuts her hair and decides to be more assertive in her life.

After several near misses and almost-dates, Carlie and Peter Parker set up a date at the Coffee Bean. Harry Osborn and Mary Jane Watson happen to be there and the two girls get talking, when all of a sudden Lily bursts through the wall, followed by an attacking team of supervillains. Mary Jane asks Carlie to help Lily, who has gone into labor, but they are held captive by Doctor Octopus. Spider-Man manages to save them and rescue Lily's newborn infant from the supervillains. Later, Harry Osborn and Mary Jane take Lily to safety, but Carlie was too angry with Lily and instead focuses her energy on trying to find Peter. She is confronted by Tombstone. The police arrive and Tombstone escapes but later doubles back to follow her after discovering that Carlie knows Menace's secret identity. Carlie, Mary Jane, and Lily are able to defeat Tombstone when the latter attacks them.

Afterward, Peter and Carlie continue to hang out for a time, but Peter lacks the courage to ask her out, leaving Carlie fuming. She gives an ultimatum and after seeing her at Harry's going-away party, Peter asks her to be his girlfriend. The two kiss and begin dating.

=== "Big Time" ===
Peter and Carlie have now been dating for a short while. When Michele Gonzales moves back to Chicago, Peter considers moving in with Carlie, but she decides that it is too early in their relationship.

During the "Return of Anti-Venom" storyline, Carlie correctly deduces that the new Wraith is her police captain Yuri Watanabe. This becomes more obvious when she visits evidence storage and learns of a mysterious incident that supposedly destroyed Wraith's mask, with Watanabe being the last visitor beforehand. Having secretly placed her cell phone into Watanabe's pocket earlier and following her target, Carlie's suspicions are confirmed. Rather than turn Watanabe in like she previously did to Vin and her father, Carlie agrees to keep it secret and suggests that Watanabe needs to improve on covering tracks for her own safety.

=== "Spider-Island" ===
During the "Spider-Island" storyline, Carlie gains spider-powers due to the Jackal's genetically-altered bedbugs. However, her mutation turns her into a monstrous Man-Spider like the millions of others in New York City under Adriana Soria's control. She and the rest of the civilian population are cured when Spider-Man uses Doctor Octopus's octo-bots to disperse the antidote. When she returns to normal, Carlie breaks up with Peter after deducing that the latter is Spider-Man, furious that she has been lied to once again.

=== "Superior Spider-Man" ===
Around the end of the Dying Wish storyline, Carlie tries to stop Doctor Octopus breaking into the NYPD to reclaim a golden Octobot, not knowing that he is really Peter's mind in Doctor Octopus's body. Peter tries to calm her down, but she shoots Peter, causing the bullet to ricochet and shooting through Carlie's shoulder. She is taken to the hospital, where she recovers.

Later, Mary Jane and Carlie are surprised by some footage showing the Superior Spider-Man shaking hands with Mayor J. Jonah Jameson thanking Spider-Man for stopping the Sinister Six. Carlie mentions that things have been weird since her run in with Doctor Octopus, but does not explain why. Carlie decides to "go back to work", wanting to know what really happened to Peter. After investigating, Carlie uncovers that the Superior Spider-Man is Doctor Octopus controlling Spider-Man's body.

The Goblin King sprays the Goblin formula on Carlie after she refuses to divulge Spider-Man's identity. The Goblin formula used on Carlie begins to take effect, transforming her into a form nicknamed Monster. When prompted to reveal Spider-Man's identity by the Goblin King, Carlie questioned if the Goblin King is really Osborn. Carlie did not believe this and asked to remove the Goblin King's mask to prove the fact. Sajani Jaffrey creates a cure for Carlie, which is administered by Wraith.

=== "Fresh Start" ===
Carlie returned to New York during Marvel's "Fresh Start" relaunch. She catches up with Mary Jane in a coffee shop and reveals she did lab work down in New Orleans before deciding to returning to New York. Noticing that Mary Jane is dating Peter once more, she decides to introduce a support group featuring friends and loved ones of superheroes called "The Lookups".

== Powers and abilities ==
Carlie Cooper is an expert at forensics. For a while, she also had spider abilities which eventually mutated into a Man-Spider. As Monster, she has likely obtained similar powers to various Goblins due to the Goblin Formula circulating within her system which grants her superhuman strength, stamina, and speed.

== Reception ==
In 2021, Screen Rant included Monster in their "Spider-Man: 10 Best Female Villains" list.

== Other versions ==
=== MC2 ===
In the MC-2 Universe, where Peter Parker works with the police department after retiring as Spider-Man, Carlie is the person who gave Peter the idea to work with the police.

=== Spider-Island ===
In the 2011 storyline "Spider-Island", an alternate universe version of Carlie Cooper appears. This version was among those mutated into a spider monster by the Queen. Spider-Man, Agent Venom, and Iron Goblin use the Lizard formula to transform those affected into humanoid lizards, freeing them from the Queen's control.

== In other media ==
Carlie Cooper appears as a non-playable character in Spider-Man Unlimited, voiced by Tara Platt. Another version based on her Spider-Island counterpart is playable.
