= Vin Gonzales =

Marvel Comics character

Publication information
- Publisher: Marvel Comics
- First appearance: Spider-Man: Free Comic Book Day (June 2007)
- Created by: Dan Slott (writer); Phil Jimenez (artist)

In-story information
- Team affiliations: NYPD
- Supporting character of: Spider-Man

Vin Gonzales is a fictional character appearing in American comic books published by Marvel Comics. The character has been depicted as a supporting character of Spider-Man in Marvel's main shared universe. He was the roommate of Peter Parker as well as Parker's first romantic rival since the retconing of his marriage to Mary Jane Watson in "One More Day." He is the younger brother of Michele Gonzales.

== Fictional character biography ==
Vin Gonzales is an NYPD officer and the roommate of Peter Parker. He does not seem to trust Spider-Man and is unaware that Peter is Spider-Man. His anger towards Spider-Man increases when Kraven the Hunter's daughter Ana Kravinoff mistakes him for Spider-Man, which leads to him being suspended from his job. After he is captured by Ana, Vin is saved by the real Spider-Man, who denies being Peter.

Later, Carlie Cooper finds several Spider-tracers in the vicinity of Peter and Vin's apartment. When she investigates, she finds a bag of spider-tracers under Vin's bed. Vin returns to get his key when Carlie reveals the bag and asks for explanation. Vin admits to Carlie that he and Al were involved in a secret conspiracy with other policemen to turn public opinion against Spider-Man in a smear campaign by planting tracers on dead bodies. Vin is captured and taken to Ryker's Island, but is rescued by Spider-Man. His sister, Michele Gonzales, who is an attorney, works out a plea deal for him, giving him six months in prison and a removal from the NYPD in exchange for the names of all the police involved.

== Other versions ==
An alternate universe version of Vin Gonzales from Earth-982 appears in The Amazing Spider-Man Family #4.

== In other media ==
Vin Gonzales makes non-speaking cameo appearances in The Spectacular Spider-Man.

== See also ==
- Kraven's First Hunt
