= Mary Jane Watson =

Marvel Comics character

- Art by Adam Hughes

Publication information
- Publisher: Marvel Comics
- First appearance: Cameo appearance: The Amazing Spider-Man #25 (June 1965); First full appearance: The Amazing Spider-Man #42 (November 1966); As Red Sonja: Marvel Team-Up #79 (December 1979); As Iron Spider: The Amazing Spider-Man (volume 4) #15 (September 2016); As Jackpot: The Amazing Spider-Man (volume 6) #31 (August 2023); As Venom: All-New Venom #1 (December 2024; masked); All-New Venom #5 (April 2025; unmasked)
- Created by: Stan Lee (writer); Steve Ditko (artist/writer); John Romita Sr. (artist)

In-story information
- Full name: Mary Jane Watson
- Place of origin: New York City, United States
- Supporting character of: Spider-Man; Iron Man
- Notable aliases: Mary Jane Watson-Parker; Spider-Woman; Mrs. Spider-Man; Spinneret (Earth-18119); Red Sonja; Jackpot; Venom
- Abilities: Skilled business executive; Master model and actress; As Jackpot: Random superpower generation via Jackpot Bracelet; As Venom: Superhuman strength, speed, agility, and durability; Ability to cling to most surfaces; Organic webbing; Limited shapeshifting and camouflage; Symbiote's autonomous defense capabilities; Undetectable by Spider-Man's "Spider-sense"

Mary Jane Watson is a character appearing in American comic books published by Marvel Comics. The character was created by Stan Lee and Steve Ditko, making her first appearance in The Amazing Spider-Man #15 (August 1964), and subsequently designed by John Romita Sr. in #42 (November 1966). Since then, she has gone on to become Spider-Man's main love interest and later his wife (as Mary Jane Watson-Parker). Mary Jane Watson has also served as a supporting character to Iron Man.

Although she made a brief first appearance in The Amazing Spider-Man #25 with a plant obscuring her face, as part of a long-running recurring gag about Aunt May attempting to set Peter up with her friend's "nice girl" niece, Mary Jane's first official face reveal was a cameo appearance in The Amazing Spider-Man #42. Designed and drawn by John Romita Sr., her entrance is regarded as one of the most iconic introductions in comic history, owing to its build-up, her hyper-vibrant red hair and beauty, and her introductory line, "Face it, Tiger… you just hit the jackpot!". Since then, 'Tiger' has been her most recognizable nickname for Peter, spanning comics and media adaptations.

Throughout her initial appearances, Mary Jane was written as a foil to Peter's initially intended soulmate, Gwen Stacy, with her extroverted, fun-loving personality (a mask for her troubled home life) contrasting with Gwen being more like Peter in demeanor and intellect. Nonetheless, following Gwen's death in "The Night Gwen Stacy Died" story arc, the heartbroken Mary Jane became more caring and empathetic, and eventually one of the few people to consistently know Peter's secret identity. This would result in the two falling deeply in love and eventually getting married, before their marriage was undone in the storyline "One More Day" due to the timeline manipulations by Mephisto. Unbeknownst to them, they are further destined to have a daughter who will end Mephisto's eventual reign over the Earth, whom Mephisto seeks to erase from reality. In Spider-Man/Red Sonja, she becomes Red Sonja, in Armed and Dangerous, she becomes the third Jackpot, while in All-New Venom, she becomes the new host of Venom. In the alternate universes of the Marvel Multiverse, Mary Jane is depicted as the superheroines Spider-Woman in Exiles (as a lesbian) and Marvel Mangaverse (as straight), and Spinneret in Amazing Spider-Man: Renew Your Vows, as well as Carnage in Spider-Gwen.

Since her debut, Mary Jane Watson has been described as one of Marvel's most notable non-powered female characters. In film, Kirsten Dunst portrayed the character in Sam Raimi's Spider-Man trilogy, while Shailene Woodley had an uncredited silent cameo appearance as the character in the 2014 film The Amazing Spider-Man 2; Zoë Kravitz voiced Mary Jane in the 2018 animated film Spider-Man: Into the Spider-Verse, with Nicole Delaney and Melissa Sturm voicing other versions of the character in its 2023 sequel Spider-Man: Across the Spider-Verse.

== Publication history ==
Mary Jane Watson is mentioned in The Amazing Spider-Man #15 (August 1964), and is initially used as a running joke of the series, as Peter Parker's Aunt May repeatedly attempts to set her unwilling nephew up on a date with her. Parker (also known as Spider-Man) consistently worms his way out of meeting Mary Jane who, aside from a brief appearance in #25 (June 1965) with her face obscured, is never actually seen until The Amazing Spider-Man #42 (November 1966). Peter David wrote in 2010 that artist John Romita Sr. "made the definitive statement of his arrival by pulling Mary Jane out from behind the oversized potted plant [that blocked the readers' view of her face in issue #25] and placing her on panel in what would instantly become an iconic moment". Romita has stated that in designing Mary Jane, he "used Ann-Margret from the movie Bye Bye Birdie as a guide, using her coloring, the shape of her face, her red hair and her form-fitting short skirts".

According to co-creator Stan Lee, he and Romita had intended for Gwen Stacy to be Spider-Man's one true love, and introduced Mary Jane "just for fun", but that "somehow, Mary Jane seemed to have all the personality, and much as we tried to make Gwen more attractive, we couldn't! We, ourselves, felt that Mary Jane ended up being not only more beautiful but more fun and more interesting, and we finally decided to let Peter end up with her, but it was… as though the characters had taken over!".

The Amazing Mary Jane, comic book starred by Mary Jane

Mary Jane Watson's unexpected popularity with readers after her debut changed the course of the plan for Gwen Stacy's character, who was intended to be the true love for Peter and was characterized as a sweet Daddy's girl in contrast to Mary Jane's '60s counterculture, vampy and liberated personality. Fans surprisingly liked Mary Jane more and demanded for her to replace Gwen's role as Peter Parker's main love interest as readers found Mary Jane more exciting and that "no matter how we [i.e. Lee and his artist/co-plotter collaborators] wrote it, Mary Jane always seemed more interesting!". Mary Jane's flamboyance and 'life of the party' personality (a mask in reality) were written as a contrast to Gwen, being more on Peter's intellectual and emotional wavelength. However, following Gwen's death in "The Night Gwen Stacy Died" story arc, the character was reworked to be more emotionally grounded and open-hearted.

The names "Mary Jane" and "MJ" are also common slang terms for marijuana. When asked about this, Stan Lee claimed it was purely coincidental, that he knew nothing about drugs and had never tried marijuana.

Gerry Conway succeeded Stan Lee as writer of The Amazing Spider-Man in 1972. Conway pushed Mary Jane to the forefront of the cast, and made her a serious love interest for Peter Parker. Like Lee, Conway found Mary Jane to be more compelling than Gwen: "[Mary Jane] hadn't lost the edge that made her an interesting character. Gwen didn't have an edge. She was just a nice person. I don't think she had a mean bone in her body, and wasn't likely to do something that was likely to screw things up for Peter, out of some misguided sense of self-aggrandizement, which Mary Jane was quite capable of doing—which makes her a much more interesting character".

In 1979, the character was revealed as the modern-day descendant/reincarnation of Red Sonja in Marvel Team-Up #79, able to become the warrior whenever holding her former self's sword. In 1987, the character was married to Spider-Man in The Amazing Spider-Man Annual #21. As a consequence, writer J. M. DeMatteis made Mary Jane and her marriage to Spider-Man one of the central themes of the critically acclaimed "Kraven's Last Hunt", published the same year as the wedding. DeMatteis commented that "'Kraven's Last Hunt' has a lot of darkness in it, but the story primarily is about Peter and his journey into the light and the power of simple human love. The reason Peter makes it out is because he has Mary Jane in his life, and that is his salvation". Mary Jane then returned as Red Sonja in the limited series Spider-Man/Red Sonja by Michael Avon Oeming and Mel Rubi.

Marvel editor-in-chief Joe Quesada said that he feels the marriage ages the characters, making them less appealing to young readers, and lessens the dramatic, "soap opera" possibilities, but also stated that "divorcing or widowing, or annulling the marriage… would only be worse". He has also pointed out that the marriage itself was editorially mandated; Stan Lee decided to marry the characters in his daily newspaper strip and, even though the two were not even dating at the time in the comic book series, it was decided to marry them in the regular Marvel Universe as well. In 2007, Quesada presided over the controversial "One More Day" storyline, which he also drew, in which Peter and Mary Jane's marriage is erased from history and everyone's memories by the devil Mephisto. Quesada states he is an avid fan of the Peter and MJ relationship, and in several interviews has claimed that the alternate MC2 universe, in which Peter and Mary Jane are happily married, is a "natural progression" of the characters.

The erasing of Peter and Mary Jane's marriage was initially adopted in the newspaper strip as well, but due to negative reader reaction Lee later revealed it to be a bad dream. Mary Jane remains Spider-Man's wife in the newspaper strip continuity.

Although the marriage stayed erased, Mary Jane and Peter Parker became a couple again during Nick Spencer's run in Amazing Spider-Man. She got a spin-off comic later, The Amazing Mary Jane, by Leah Williams, Carlos Gomez and Carlos López.

Mary Jane next starred with Black Cat in the limited series Mary Jane & Black Cat by Jed MacKay and Vincenzo Carratu and Jackpot & Black Cat by Celeste Bronfman and Emilio Laiso, and the ongoing series All-New Venom by Al Ewing and Carlos Gómez.

== Fictional character biography ==
=== Early history ===
Of Scottish descent, Mary Jane is depicted as an extremely beautiful, green-eyed redhead and was the primary romantic interest of Peter Parker for the majority of the forty years between her first full appearance in 1966 and the One More Day story in 2007 (Peter and Mary Jane married in 1987). Initially, she competed with others for Peter's affection, most prominently with Gwen Stacy and the Black Cat. Mary Jane's relatively unknown early life was eventually explored in The Amazing Spider-Man #259.

Early issues of The Amazing Spider-Man featured a running joke about Peter dodging his Aunt May's attempts to set him up with "that nice Watson girl next-door", whom Peter had not yet met and assumed would not be his type, since his aunt liked her (in the Parallel Lives graphic novel an identical scenario is shown between Mary Jane and her aunt Anna). Mary Jane made her first actual appearance in The Amazing Spider-Man #25 (June 1965), although her face was obscured. However, she was seen by both Liz Allan and Betty Brant, who are both shocked by how attractive she is. It is not until The Amazing Spider-Man #42 (November 1966) that her face is actually seen. In that issue, on the last page, Peter finally meets her, and he is stunned by her beauty even as she speaks the now-famous line: "Face it, Tiger… you just hit the jackpot!"

Mary Jane's face is shown for the first time, and her famous catchphrase is first uttered. Art by John Romita Sr. From The Amazing Spider-Man #42.

Peter begins to date her, much to the annoyance of Gwen Stacy. However, they eventually become irritated with each other and Peter subsequently chooses to date Gwen. Mary Jane, who becomes Harry Osborn's former love interest and former girlfriend for about a year, remains a close friend to Peter and Gwen. Despite her enjoyment of life, her friendships, and dating, Mary Jane refuses to be tied down for too long. When her relationship with Harry Osborn comes to an end, it has significant impact on Harry, driving him to a drug overdose. This in turn creates a boomerang effect, driving his father Norman Osborn to the brink of insanity, temporarily restoring his memories as the Green Goblin.

After the Green Goblin murders Gwen in The Amazing Spider-Man #121, Mary Jane attempts to comfort Peter. Peter, who is distraught over the loss of Gwen Stacy, angrily confronts MJ about her seemingly flighty and carefree attitude. He questions her ability to ever care about people like him and Gwen, and states "You wouldn't be sorry if your own mother died," unaware that her mother had actually died. Mary Jane is hurt by Peter's comments. She attempts to leave, but hesitates as she approaches the door, and ultimately chooses to stay with him. This served as a turning point in their relationship, and over the next couple of years, she and Peter become very close friends. Eventually, upon realizing the feelings that they share for one another, they decide to take their relationship to the next level. Their relationship has a few initial hurdles, such as MJ's hot temper and Peter's always dashing off to be Spider-Man. Following the events of the original clone saga, Peter realizes that Mary Jane is the girl he has always loved, and the two begin dating again.

Despite loving Peter, MJ does not wish to be tied down. Yet, she allows the relationship to progress and is left with a difficult decision when Peter proposes to her. After taking a short time to consider, she turns him down. Following a series of traumatic experiences involving Peter's absences and his costumed alter ego endangering his Aunt May, a spiritually exhausted MJ leaves New York for several months. Peter meanwhile dates other women, most notably Felicia Hardy.

MJ returns, her behavior showing a marked change with her abandonment of her false front. Following an attack on Peter by Puma, she breaks down and admits her knowledge of Peter's secret identity in The Amazing Spider-Man #257. After learning of her own family history in The Amazing Spider-Man #259, Peter finds a new respect for her and begins to truly understand her. MJ makes it clear to Peter that knowing his identity changes nothing about her feelings, and that she only loves him as a friend, her best friend.

Despite the one-shot graphic novel Amazing Spider-Man: Parallel Lives and Untold Tales of Spider-Man #16 revealing that Mary Jane discovered Peter's secret when she noticed Spider-Man climbing out of Peter's bedroom window after his uncle's murder, many comics published before this revelation claimed that she had simply "figured it out", with the details of how and when left ambiguous to the reader.

After yet another period of reconsidering his priorities in life, Peter contemplates letting go of the Spider-Man mantle, with Mary Jane backing the decision, but his relationship with Felicia Hardy soon resumes. Feeling lost and guilty, Peter visits Mary Jane and apologizes with an awkward kiss before heading to Berlin with Ned Leeds.

Following Ned Leeds' murder at the hands of the Foreigner, a changed and bitter Peter returns to New York, where his lack of direction in life is not helped when Ned is framed as the Hobgoblin, and Felicia elects to leave Peter behind as she is tied to the Foreigner. Mary Jane returns to Peter, presumably to patch things up, but Peter surprises her with a second proposal of marriage, which MJ again turns down. She returns to her family to settle old debts with her father, with Peter following her. After aiding her sister in having her crooked father arrested, and aiding Peter against a Spider-Slayer, Mary Jane has an epiphany on marriage, and agrees to become Peter's wife.

=== Marriage ===
In spite of Peter and Mary Jane's mutual worry that they were marrying too early, Peter's concern for her safety, and her unwillingness to give up her "party girl" lifestyle, they marry. She adds Peter's surname to her own, making her Mary Jane Watson-Parker. They were, at that moment, really in love. Spider-Man wears his black costume around this time, but after Mary Jane is frightened by a stalking Venom, she convinces him to change back to his old costume.

Mary Jane continues to model after her marriage, but is stalked by her wealthy landlord, Jonathan Caesar. When she rejects his advances, he kidnaps her, but she manages to escape. While Caesar is briefly incarcerated, he uses his powerful business connections within the city and has her blacklisted as a model. She gets a role on the soap opera Secret Hospital, but is unhappy with her character's air-headed and mean personality. On top of that, Caesar, who has been released from prison and is still obsessed with Mary Jane, plots to kidnap her again—this time intending to whisk her away to a private island he owns in the Caribbean. After luring Mary Jane to an abandoned studio and threatening to kill her, Caesar is confronted by Officer Goldman, a policeman assigned to Mary Jane's original case against him. Goldman then shoots Caesar dead, saving Mary Jane's life, but she is shocked by his actions. It is then revealed that Goldman is not a police officer but rather another Mary Jane fan who was behind a series of crimes disguised as accidents, involving him deliberately hurting people he believes were harming Mary Jane, including her boss who was killed by Caesar, not before blackmailing him into making the bait. Appalled by Goldman's actions, Mary Jane knocks him out and escapes. Although she successfully petitions her new boss to adjust her character's personality, a deranged fan tries to kill Mary Jane out of hatred for the actions of her soap opera character. Mary Jane quits her job out of fear for her own safety and returns to modeling. This, along with Peter's role as Spider-Man, triggers a growing divide. She briefly flirts with actor Jason Jerome, who tries to tempt her into a secret affair. She resists out of faithfulness to Peter, but her weak rebuffs fail to convince Jerome, and she realizes she is enticed by him in spite of herself. However, she eventually realizes that her craving for romance can be filled by her husband as easily as an extramarital affair, and she pointedly rejects Jerome's advances while rebuking his behavior.

Due to this stress, and the seeming return of her husband's parents, Mary Jane begins smoking (a habit she had quit in high school), only increasing the tension between her and Peter. Peter ultimately convinces her to stop smoking when he tricks her into visiting Nick Katzenberg suffering heavily from lung cancer. When his parents are discovered to be fakes, Peter is unable to cope with the knowledge and disappears for a time. Mary Jane visits her sister Gayle and her father for the first time in years, and finally reconciles with them. Meanwhile, Peter overcomes his problems on his own. When she and Peter reunite, both are happier than they had been in a long time.

=== Pregnancy ===
During the 1994–96 "Clone Saga" storyline, Peter's clone, Ben Reilly, appears. Mary Jane discovers that she is pregnant. While she experiences some complications in her pregnancy, Reilly's scientist friend Seward Trainer helps her. Peter and Ben are told by Trainer that Ben is the real Peter Parker, and Peter is the clone. After conducting the tests themselves (tests which Seward rigged) they confirm Seward's story. A disbelieving Peter, while arguing with Ben, strikes Mary Jane. After this, he decides to quit as Spider-Man, because the stress of his double life is endangering his wife and unborn child. Peter, acting on hypnotic suggestion by the Jackal, attempts to kill Mary Jane, but is prevented by Ben Reilly (as the Scarlet Spider), his teammates the New Warriors, and Kaine. Later, Peter and Mary Jane leave New York and move to Portland, Oregon. They live there peacefully for several months, adapting happily to normal life after an accident causes subtle damage to Peter's genetic structure that disrupts his ability to use his powers. However, they miss New York City and their friends, and move back, a strange illness culminating in the restoration of Peter's powers. During the Onslaught crisis, Mary Jane is scanned by a Sentinel robot, who detects genetic abnormalities in her fetus.

Soon afterward, when Mary Jane's baby is already past due, she is poisoned by Alison Mongrain, an agent of the Green Goblin. Mary Jane's baby is stillborn. Combined with Ben's death in a battle with the reborn Norman Osborn and the revelation that the tests identifying Peter as the clone were actually rigged as part of Osborn's plan to break Peter's spirit, Peter returns to the role of Spider-Man.

=== Marital problems ===
Mary Jane returns to college to major in psychology, but the stress of the ongoing manipulations of Norman Osborn take their toll. After the Gathering of Five incident and the return of Aunt May, Mary Jane begs Peter to quit being Spider-Man.

He is happy to do so for several months, but soon feels the tug of his great power and great responsibility to be a hero. Meanwhile, Mary Jane is offered a new modeling contract and reaches new heights of success. Peter becomes Spider-Man again behind Mary Jane's back, which puts strain on their marriage. At the same time, she begins receiving lewd and threatening phone calls from an anonymous stalker. Mary Jane is flying across America when her airplane explodes in midair in Amazing Spider-Man (vol. 2) #13 (January 2000). Peter is shocked and goes into deep denial over her death. Although he is set up with several other women, and his friends encourage him to move on, he believes she is still alive. Her mysterious stalker, an unnamed, telepathic mutant, has telepathically connected to Peter in some way, and wants to take over his life. He kidnapped Mary Jane as part of his plan and held her hostage for several months. The stalker kills himself after finally gleaning enough of Peter's personality and morality to discover that he had done terrible things. Peter and Mary Jane are reunited in Peter Parker: Spider-Man #29 (June 2001).

The stress of her captivity drives Mary Jane away. She moves to Los Angeles and immerses herself in acting — starring as the doomed love interest in the film Lobster-Man. Although missing Peter after he fails to meet her on a visit back to New York, she refuses to talk to him; Aunt May gets Peter to visit her in Los Angeles, however the two remain separated. Peter's encounter with the supernatural Spider-Wasp Shathra eventually leads to the two of them flying to New York and Los Angeles to see each other. Despite missing each other at their respective homes, they meet in an airport in Denver, Colorado where they reconcile after a brief encounter with Doctor Doom and Latverian terrorists.

=== "Civil War" ===
During the events of the 2006–2007 "Civil War" storyline, when Peter and Mary Jane's apartment and Aunt May's house are burned down by Charlie Weiderman, and Spider-Man joins the New Avengers, Mary Jane and May accompany him to live in Stark Tower. Mary Jane immediately feels at home with the New Avengers and is happy to finally be a part of Spider-Man's world.

The Civil War events forced Peter to stage a secret transfer of Mary Jane out of Stark Mansion, feeling that with the loss of his secret identity and his doubts about Tony Stark's ideas, Mary Jane had become a hostage in a luxurious house. Now residing in a cheap motel, her whole life had been affected, from her increasing difficulties in finding a new job as an actress to her being an easy target and prey, along with Aunt May, for the superpowered foes of Spider-Man.

Peter, Mary Jane, and Aunt May are targeted by an assassin working for Spider-Man's old foe, the Kingpin. When Peter returns to the Parker family's motel hideout, the assassin takes aim at Peter and fires, but hits May instead. Peter and MJ scramble to save May's life, rushing her from hospital to hospital while trying to maintain their fragile cover of anonymity. In trying to keep May alive and hidden from Spider-Man's enemies, they become fugitives on the run.

=== "One More Day" ===
During the 2007 "One More Day" storyline, Peter is forced to decide whether he will accept Mephisto's offer to save Aunt May in return for wiping the knowledge and memory of Peter and MJ's life together as husband and wife from the face of reality, which would leave only a single, subconscious piece of their souls to remember their love and life together, allowing Mephisto to feast on the pain exhibited by those vestiges for eternity.

MJ, despite loving Peter, accepts Mephisto's offer, but only with the caveat that Mephisto promises to restore Spider-Man's secret identity. She also asks to put his life back as it was and have a chance at happiness. Mephisto accepts these terms, and in the revised timeline, which begins at the end of The Amazing Spider-Man #545, and is further explained in the following issues, MJ and Peter were never married but instead "dated seriously for years".

In the epilogue to "One More Day", she attends a "coming home" party held by ex-Harry Osborn during one such visit, with Peter catching a small glimpse of her before she left, after ignoring her.

=== New life ===
At the end of The Amazing Spider-Man #560, as part of the "Brand New Day" storyline, Mary Jane makes her return as the girlfriend of actor Bobby Carr. In The Amazing Spider-Man #561, Mary Jane is seen getting into bed with Carr, and is later attacked by Paperdoll. Concealing herself in the panic room, Mary Jane observes a battle between Spider-Man and Paperdoll, and communicates with Spider-Man over the intercom. Mary Jane says that she and Spider-Man made a great team "in another life" and longingly touches a monitor screen showing his face, hinting that she still has strong feelings and misses him.

Peter does not learn that Mary Jane is the girlfriend of Carr nor that she was the voice on the intercom. Mary Jane is seen at the conclusion of the issue contemplating a phone call to Peter, but is hesitant to do so. She is asked for an autograph by Sara Ehret, an associate of Jackpot. Mary Jane tells her she does not know when she will return to New York. She left a message on Peter's machine but it was cut off before she could say anything.

Mary Jane has been living on the West Coast pursuing her acting career. She returns to New York after Carr is found to be taking Mutant Growth Hormone for a movie role, supplied by the White Rabbit. Carr complains that now she would tell them all about his drug use. His shallowness makes MJ walk away from him and take a TV job, which takes her back to New York City.

Mary Jane and Peter agree to meet with each other. Peter does not remember when or where as he had been drunk, and is further delayed due to his activities as Spider-Man. MJ also was drunk (while waiting for Peter to muster his courage to talk to her) and while she recalls their meeting she has overslept it. Issue 605 flashbacks to Mary Jane recalling a fight with Peter while he was dressed as Spider-Man, where she said that she did not care where he was and that he had a responsibility to their relationship. Peter begins to explain about his Uncle Ben, but Mary Jane interrupts him to say that he cannot let a single moment define his life.

In the 2010 "One Moment in Time" storyline, it is revealed that Mary Jane whispered to Mephisto that Peter would not agree to the deal unless Mary Jane tells him to make it, and that Mephisto will leave Peter alone forever when the deal is done. Mephisto replies "Agreed, as far as I'm concerned—this never happened." MJ did that to protect Peter. In present time MJ shows up at Peter's door. They talk about how they have been acting towards each other lately and both agree they want to be friends. They recall how Peter missed what was supposed to be their wedding day due to his activities as Spider-Man, leading MJ to demand that he retire from crimefighting. His refusal to do so convinced MJ that they must remain unmarried, since any children they might have would be endangered by his being a superhero.

Mary Jane goes to check on Anna Watson, just in time to stop a hitman, who goes after her. Spider-Man saves Mary Jane and dispatches the hitman. Spider-Man brings the wounded Mary Jane to Doctor Strange, who performs a healing spell on her. Peter insists that Doctor Strange should make people forget he is Spider-Man. Peter enters a protective shell to shield himself from the changes. At the last moment, he leaps out of the shield and pulls Mary Jane in with him so she will not forget either. Back in the present, Mary Jane explains that, although she still loves him, she is not strong enough to be at his side. She tells him he has to move on and find somebody who can be with him.

Peter soon begins a new relationship with Carlie Cooper. Though initially jealous, MJ decides to respect their relationship, and encourages Peter to reveal his secret identity to her.

=== "Spider-Island" and "Ends of the Earth" ===
During the "Spider-Island" storyline, much of New York City becomes infected with a virus that gives its inhabitants Peter's Spider-like abilities. MJ, who did not manifest any powers, finds herself caught in a series of riots across the city. Saved by the intervening Future Foundation, MJ later locates Peter and Carlie, the latter having also been granted spider-powers. MJ encourages Peter to use his civilian disguise when displaying his powers and rally the city against the chaos. She would later attain spider-powers herself and come to the aid of defenseless citizens, her prolonged contact with Peter during their relationship granting her a degree of immunity that protected her from Adriana Soria's mutative side-effects of the transformation. Peter successfully cures all of New York.

Shortly after, Carlie Cooper breaks up with Peter, having deduced his secret identity. Conflicted over her lingering feelings for Peter, Carlie confides in Mary Jane, and the two begin to bond over their experiences with Peter.

In the 2012 storyline "Ends of the Earth", Mary Jane purchases a nightclub.

=== "Dying Wish" and The Superior Spider-Man ===
Mary Jane remains in the role of best friend and confidant to Peter until he begins to take an interest in her romantically again. They begin dating again. Unknown to MJ, Peter has had his mind swapped by Otto Octavius. The real Peter Parker, trapped in his rival's dying body, breaks out of prison and attempts to switch back, only for his body to eventually give out on him before he can complete the procedure. As a last resort, Peter downloads all of his memories and experiences into Octavius' mind, convincing his foe to develop some sense of responsibility. Octavius, as Peter, continues to date Mary Jane after this, but she begins noticing distinctly different character traits displayed by him, such as a heavy intake of alcohol and his rude behavior towards his loved ones. Octavius intends to become more intimate with her and makes several advances, only to be rebuffed each time. In desperation and frustration, Octavius relives Peter's memories with MJ, which infuriates Peter. After one of Octavius' Spider-Bots detect Mary Jane in trouble and saves her from the Vulture gang, Mary Jane moves to kiss him, but Octavius, who has by now developed genuine feelings for her, rebuffs her, and breaks up with her, though vowing to continue to protect her.

Peter's mind is returned to his body, and informs Mary Jane that it was Octavius' mind in control of Peter's body for the past several months. Mary Jane tells him that she knows Octavius' actions were not Peter's fault, but she cannot let his dual life affect her anymore. She recognizes and admires the choices Peter has made in his life, but now she wants to build her own life, mostly thanks to the successes she has enjoyed with her nightclub and her new relationship with Ollie.

=== All-New, All-Different Marvel ===
As part of the All-New, All-Different Marvel event, Mary Jane Watson is in Chicago, Illinois hosting the opening of her newest nightclub Jackpot. Having ended her relationship with Ollie, Mary Jane had opened this nightclub after MJ's got destroyed during a superhero battle. When a Belhilio is quickly killed by an energy blast from Madame Masque, people start to run away as Iron Man and Doctor Doom arrive to confront her. With Mary Jane's assistance, Masque is apprehended, but during the fight the nightclub is irrevocably damaged. Three days later, Iron Man approaches Mary Jane Watson in Grant Park while she is mourning the loss of her club and offers her a job working for him. Mary Jane later waits for Tony Stark at Stark Tower, but their audition is interrupted by F.R.I.D.A.Y., who tells them that War Machine is missing. Before Tony becomes Iron Man and flies to Tokyo, Mary Jane gives Tony the emergency number for Peter Parker. It is revealed that Mary Jane declined Tony Stark's offer due to being uncomfortable around F.R.I.D.A.Y. However, Tony sends F.R.I.D.A.Y. to plead Mary Jane to help him stop the board of directors from seizing his company while he is off on a mission. Mary Jane claims to the board of directors that she is the new executive administrator, and she and F.R.I.D.A.Y. convince the board that the company is in safe hands.

In the Amazing Spider-Man series, it is revealed that she has eventually accepted Tony's employment offer when she and Tony attend a Parker Industry event, making Peter very uncomfortable. Later, she catches up with Betty Brant and Harry Osborn, and the three discover that businessman Augustus Roman is actually the powerful being known as Regent who is imprisoning heroes and villains to add to his own strength. Spider-Man and Iron Man try to stop Regent, but are defeated due to Regent's overwhelming power. With few options left, Mary Jane dons Peter's Iron Spider armor and uses her experience in Iron Man's suit and her brief spider powers in Spider-Island to assist Peter and Tony in battling Regent. During the fight, Mary Jane and Tony distract Regent long enough for Peter, Harry, and Miles Morales to release the rest of the prisoners. Mary Jane's attitude towards Peter during her time with him reminds Peter not to let his work take priority over his loved ones. Spider-Man warns Tony not to take Mary Jane for granted as Peter did not realize he lost Mary Jane until after she moved on.

After "Civil War II", Tony was put into a comatose state and his body went missing due to his own covert machinations. Mary Jane along with Riri Williams and Amanda Armstrong went on a search for him, and it was not until F.R.I.D.A.Y. made a calculated analysis that the A.I. duplicate of Tony would know exactly where to find him. However, Tony was continually complicating the search by sending them to other locations, believing he needed his privacy until he was finally ready.

After Peter's company went belly up during the "Secret Empire" storyline and he got a new career as a science editor at the Daily Bugle, Mary Jane started being more supportive of Peter getting his life back on track. After a less than stellar Alchemax demonstration, Mary Jane and Peter started being more romantically involved, but as Peter still wore his Spider-Man suit, Mary Jane was conflicted: she wanted Peter to stop being Spider-Man but people really counted on him and she did not want to be the one to do that. She has Peter exit her apartment as Spider-Man so if anyone sees they will just think she was talking with him because she knows Stark.

After Norman Osborn becomes the Red Goblin, MJ received a warning from Peter and adjusted Stark Tower's defences against a Symbiote intruder. However, because Venom arrived before Red Goblin, the defenses only injured Venom and had no effect on the Red Goblin. Surviving with minor injuries after a short skirmish, MJ urged Peter to absorb the Venom Symbiote, which would give him the edge to stop his arch-enemy. She, along with others attacked by Red Goblin, were cured of his Carnage spikes by Flash Thompson with the Anti-Venom symbiote.

=== Fresh Start ===
As part of the Fresh Start relaunch event, Peter's personal life took serious knocks in both his civilian and heroic life: his doctorate was determined to be based on plagiarized work (due to him having received the doctorate when Doctor Octopus was controlling his body and the scientist used his own work) which led to him being fired from the Bugle, while the Kingpin tried to separate Spider-Man from other heroes by making him the only vigilante he would accept in the new anti-vigilante New York. However, his personal life picked up when he began reconnecting with Mary Jane more regularly and they talked about recent events. Finally, Peter told Mary Jane that he needed her in his life once again, prompting Mary Jane to decide on a "fresh start" and resume her relationship with him one more time.

As she and Peter resume dating, Mary Jane is encouraged by a returning Carlie Cooper to join a special support unit for associates, friends and partners of superheroes run by Jarvis called The Look Ups. Hesitant at first, Mary Jane eventually shares with the group her feelings for Peter, the loss of her job at Stark Industries, and her anxieties and occasional doubts about her importance to him. Afterwards, Jarvis compliments Mary Jane and tells her she is indispensable. MJ lets Peter know this when they spend the night together shortly after Peter's battle with the Thieves Guild. Peter admits to Mary Jane that he revealed his secret identity once more to Felicia Hardy, but Mary Jane tells him that she is not envious of this and understands.

After Peter's return as a college student, Mary Jane joined him for a dinner visit with the Connors family, as Peter and Curt discussed Peter's being Curt's teacher assistant job offer. While Peter was reluctant to take the offer, Mary Jane tried to argue he take it, as the chance could help him going forward. While Peter is ill from fever, Mary Jane tries to care for him, but he goes running headlong into danger as Taskmaster and Black Ant captured Curt Connors' son Billy and she worriedly awaits Peter as he departs. As she waits, she tries to alleviate her anxiety unaware that an unknown entity (Kindred) is stalking her to get to Peter; but Kindred does not hurt her, viewing her as an innocent. After waking up, she tripped on Peter's dropped clothing and broke a window, and as she was cleaning herself up Peter returned in his black suit (courtesy of Kraven the Hunter) in a rushed panic believing some terrible had befallen her, but Mary Jane assured him that she was safe.

While attending a play with Carlie Cooper (Peter missing the planned date as he attempts to find the missing Curt Connors), Mary Jane gets unwittingly involved in an attack by the new Electro, who takes the lead actress hostage and attempts to ransom her online, only to change plans due to the low response to finding out how many people would pay to kill her. After Carlie causes a distraction, Mary Jane is able to switch places with the actress and trick Electro into a trap that knocks the villain out. The subsequent popularity of Mary Jane's speech prompts new public interest in her former acting career, to the point that her old agent calls her about new offers.

Mary Jane accepts one of these new offers, and with Peter's encouragement and support, heads off for a two-month stint in Hollywood filming a new movie. Peter had hoped to accompany Mary Jane to the airport, but he was forced to cancel those plans to help out his sister Teresa Parker. By the time Peter's mission had concluded, MJ had departed. The two would have a conversation by phone later that evening where Mary Jane assured Peter she understood why he could not take her to the airport and gives him all her love. It is revealed Peter had intended to propose to Mary Jane again had he been able to see her off.

Soon after filming started, Mary Jane discovered Mysterio's disguise as the movie's producer, who swore to her that this project was supposed to be an authentic depiction of his life. At first grudgingly, Mary Jane cooperated with him when the Savage Six began attacking the project after the Vulture felt offended for the "unauthorized" usage of his person in the plot. During an appearance on a talk show, Mary Jane witnessed a sinister, oni-masked individual committing a murder, and was placed under witness protection.

During the "Last Remains" storyline, Mary Jane ultimately returned to New York amidst the chaos inflicted by Peter's allies the Order of the Web, who had been possessed by Kindred. Mary Jane is caught in a head-on collision but survives and is rescued by Norman Osborn. Norman takes her back to Ravencroft where he reveals to her that he is now a changed man, cleansed of his sins, and that Kindred is his son Harry Osborn. Mary Jane agrees to help Norman reach Harry and is brought to Kindred's lair, where she finds Peter and the Order of the Web are now captives. Harry tortures Peter, demanding that he confess to something, but MJ tells Harry Peter has no recollection of the precise sin. She tells Harry she blames herself for his downward spiral and offers to sacrifice herself. Norman suddenly attacks and seemingly cuts down Mary Jane with a pumpkin bomb, which enrages Harry. A panicked Peter checks on Mary Jane, but she assures him the bomb is a blank and that this all part of the plan. Kindred is ultimately captured by the alliance of Norman and Wilson Fisk.

Mary Jane decides to remain in New York and help Peter deal with the fall out of Kindred's attack. She takes him to the old theatre where she got her big break and encourages him to use performance art to vent out his frustrations. Peter does so and he eventually breaks down, MJ comforts him. After Peter heads off to attend class at ESU, Mary Jane discovers Mysterio was eavesdropping. Mysterio asks Mary Jane if she will ever tell her boyfriend about their working arrangement, MJ tells him Peter has enough on his mind, and asks Mysterio about Kindred, suspecting he knows the truth, but Mysterio does not commit to an answer

During the "Sinister War" storyline, Peter and Mary Jane eventually attend the premiere of MJ's new movie, and Peter is formerly introduced to Cage McKnight, still in the dark over his true identity. MJ tells Mysterio she will tell Peter the truth later tonight. Peter has a surprise of his own as he is planning to propose to Mary Jane when the movie is over, but the Savage Six take the opportunity to attack, eager for a taste of revenge on Mysterio. As the crowds in the movie theatre disperse, Mary Jane stops to help people who have fallen over, and stands her ground against the Tarantula. Peter switches to Spider-Man and comes to her rescue. Doctor Octopus and the four of his team then attack the theatre. Mysterio assists Mary Jane, exposing his identity to Peter and the Sinister and Savage teams. Mary Jane confesses to a concerned Peter that she knew who Mysterio was all along and vouches for him. Mysterio tries to tell Peter that he and Mary Jane's deal with Mephisto is to blame for everything that is presently happening, but Peter is far too distracted by the warring factions. Otto offers Beck the opportunity to join the Sinister Six, as long as he helps them capture Mary Jane. Mysterio escapes, taking MJ with him, promising her that the 'devil will get his due'.

Beck takes Mary Jane to his old studios, he reveals to her of his prior demise and descent into hell, but that he was offered a chance at renewed life by Harry Osborn. Beck did as instructed and 'did his bidding', in exchange, Kindred opened up new worlds for Beck to explore such as the Ultimate Universe. Over time, the visits from Kindred became less frequent and Beck let his guard down, believing himself to be free, until Kindred had use for him again. Beck then reveals to Mary Jane that he was instrumental in helping her come to terms with Harry's 'death' in his guise of Doctor Ludwig Rinehart, although Mary Jane can barely recall this. Despite Mary Jane's pleas, Mysterio remains loyal to Kindred's plan and leaves her to his master's mercy.

Kindred unmasks to reveal the features of what appears to be Gwen Stacy, but is in actuality the husk of Sarah Stacy, the alleged daughter of Gwen and Norman Osborn. Mary Jane learns Kindred is still Harry using Sarah's body as a host, and that she nor her brother Gabriel was never truly Norman or Gwen's child, but clones created by an A.I version of Harry. Mary Jane also discovers that Mysterio tampered with her memories disguised as her therapist, which led her to believe the cloned twins were Gwen's children. Kindred tells Mary Jane the time has come to face her own sins and opens a doorway to Hell.

Mary Jane flees into one of Kindred's portals and arrives at Sarah and Gabriel's home in Paris, where she tends to a stricken Peter. She and Peter briefly banter until Norman arrives to warn them that Sarah and Gabriel are preparing to ambush them. As Peter holds his own against the twin Kindred, Norman admits to Mary Jane that he made a deal with Mephisto, to which MJ reacts with shock. Norman's son Harry, now revealed to have been a clone of the original, arrives to help tip the scales in Peter's conflict with Kindred, but is eventually, and brutally, cut down and killed. Peter is also eventually buried under rubble. Mary Jane comes to his rescue. Their unwavering commitment to one another rids the Kindred spirits of Mephisto's influence, and the Stacy twins are finally allowed to die. In Las Vegas, Doctor Strange is involved in a high stakes gambit with Mephisto to free the true Harry Osborn's soul from the grasp of the devil, Upon succeeding, Strange asks Mephisto why he has attempted to claim Peter Parker. Mephisto reveals he foresees a future where Peter will defeat him and end his reign over the Earth. As Doctor Strange departs, he reminds Mephisto that the love Peter shares with those closest to him will always enhance his life and make every one of them better. The vision of Mephisto's future changes to show it is a red-headed Spider-Woman, not Peter, who ultimately thwarts the devil's reign. Mary Jane and Peter make their way home to heal and face the dawn of a new day together as a loving, and seemingly 'unbreakable', couple.

=== Spider-Man Beyond ===
In the wake of Harry's death, Mary Jane advises a grieving Peter to perhaps devote some time to properly process the loss and take a break from being Spider-Man. Before Peter can consider these plans though, he is caught up in a battle with the perilous U-Foes that incapacitates him, leading to his hospitalization. His clone Ben Reilly contacts Mary Jane and May Parker. Mary Jane is angry with Ben, believing him to be responsible for Peter's predicament. Peter then slips into a coma, but not before giving Ben his blessing to take the reins as Spider-Man in his absence.

Peter eventually recovers and awakens from his coma, Mary Jane continues to look after him, and at one point saves him from a serial killer stalking the wards of the hospital.

Peter's condition eventually draws out Felicia Hardy, and she and Mary Jane unite to save Peter from the clutches of the Hood, who is need of his cloak. They locate it at the headquarters of Tombstone. Mary Jane disguises herself as the Black Cat and retrieves the cloak, the two then return it to the Hood, where it ends up devouring him. Peter, asleep the entire time, awakes to find Mary Jane and Felicia present, but believes it to be a recurring dream he has of the two women and asks them to be 'gentle' with him. Mary Jane and Felicia later joke about their mutual interest in Peter on the rooftops, with Felicia admitting how 'perfect' MJ is for Peter.

Mary Jane returns home, where she is confronted by Ben Reilly's girlfriend Janine Godbe, aka Elizabeth Tyne, who is in possession of a hard drive provided by Otto Octavius that details the hidden agenda of the Beyond Corporation, which presently employs Ben. Mary Jane takes Janine to the Daily Bugle, but they are confronted by the Queen Goblin. Ben Reilly makes the save, but due to the Beyond Corporation tampering with his mind to make him more controllable, Ben has forgotten how to be selfless and responsible, so he decides to save what is most important to him only and flees with Janine, leaving Mary Jane to the mercy of Kafka. Before Kafka can use her 'goblin gaze' on Mary Jane to draw out her anxieties and innermost fears, they are interrupted by Felicia. Kafka instead uses her gaze on Felicia and its effects compel Felicia to suicide. However, Felicia is saved by Peter. Mary Jane hands over Peter's costume to him and he suits up to confront Kakfa. After Peter defeats the Queen Goblin, Mary Jane tells him to go and find Ben.

Shortly afterwards, Peter fails to save Ben from the manipulations of the Beyond Corporation, denying Ben a chance to reclaim his missing memories. Mary Jane helps Peter grieve the loss of Ben as well as aid in his physical recovery. Weeks pass, and after completing a session at her apartment, Mary Jane asks Peter if he would like to stay with her, not just for today, but for good, believing the time has come once more to share their lives together. Peter readily accepts, only for the two to be interrupted by a mysterious being bathed in light. The being tells Peter a path of blood has led him to his door and that Peter must come with him.

=== Six Months Later/Hellfire Gala ===
Following an incident that decimates a section of Pennsylvania, Peter finds himself alienated from the superhero community and on bad terms with Mary Jane. The two have broken up and Mary Jane is now seemingly dating a man named Paul Rabin, with kids seeing Mary Jane as a mother figure, with the daughter heavily resembling her. Despite their lack of communication, Mary Jane still shows concern for Peter when Felicia Hardy pays her a visit asking about his present whereabouts.

Sometime later, Mary Jane and her aunt Anna have become brand ambassadors for medical treatments supplied by the mutant island nation of Krakoa, with an ailing Anna now suffering from dementia. Mary Jane arranges a meeting with Norman Osborn to verify that the treatments are safe to use. At Oscorp, she meets up with Peter, who apologizes for routinely trying to call her when she did not want to be contacted. Mary Jane accepts his apology and attempts to tell him something truthful about how she is presently feeling when the two are interrupted by Paul. It is implied Paul has had a visceral encounter with Peter in the past. Mary Jane and Paul depart, with MJ telling Paul she has the assurances she needs to try out the medicines, and makes preparations to attend the annual Hellfire Gala.

MJ later finds an intruder in her Aunt's house, the X-Men's former ally-turned-nemesis Moira MacTaggert, who attacks her and renders her unconscious, intending to take her place at the Gala by disguising herself as her.

Using Mary Jane as a "meat puppet", Moira infiltrates the Gala and interacts with several in attendance, including her son Proteus and MJ's ex-boyfriend Peter. Eventually, the X-Men uncover the truth behind Moira's infiltration, and Mary Jane temporarily breaks free of Moira's control to try and warn Logan of her predicament. Eventually, Moira escapes Krakoa along with a clone of Mister Sinister called Doctor Stasis after Moira sides with Orchis, only for Peter and Wolverine to follow them. Later, Moira is seen meeting with Druig of the Eternals revealing the secrets of the Five's resurrection protocols. Moira has abandoned Mary Jane, with the implication that she has killed the Krakoan ambassador.

However, this is not the case, and Peter and Logan rescue Mary Jane. Upon returning to New York, Peter offers to talk to Mary Jane, but she refuses. Peter asks if it is because of Paul. When she confirms this is so, Peter challenges MJ on her feelings for Paul, but MJ angrily says this is not about him, but about something she thought he understood responsibility, and walks away.

=== Dark Web ===
As Peter's friends assembled at the Coffee Bean to honor the memory of the twice dead Harry Osborn during the "Dark Web", Mary Jane decided now was the appropriate time to make peace with Peter and asked if she could share a coffee with him.

Shortly after the party, Mary Jane returned home, where she and her family came under attack from demons possessing the furniture. Felicia Hardy arrived on the scene with the intent on checking in on MJ's well-being, only to find MJ defending her family with newly acquired powers. The exact nature of MJ's abilities are determined by pure chance and she has no control over which ones will manifest. When a curious Felicia teased Mary Jane about her powers, she refused to reveal where the powers came from and that Peter, who is unaware of them, must never know. Mary Jane asks Felicia to watch out for Peter, before both are transported to Limbo where they run into Count Belasco. Belasco reveals to Black Cat that he summoned her there for a reason and considers MJ "a charming bonus". Over dinner he explains to them that he once had a Soul Sword that he made with the help of the Elder Gods, and used to rule over Limbo until the Gods confiscated it from him as a punishment and Magik overthrew him with her own Soul Sword. The Elder Gods put the sword in the Screaming Castle, a place he could never get to until Chasm and Madelyne Pryor's demonic invasion of New York created an opportunity for him. He wanted the two of them to steal back the sword for him so he could re-conquer Limbo and agreed to send them back to Earth once they'd done so. Upon entering the castle the two are attacked by the castles cannibalistic prisoners, with Mary Jane reluctantly using her powers after explaining to Black Cat that her powers work by creating a roulette wheel and she is not sure what will happen if she gets three skulls. The cannibals chase them to a bottomless pit, but Mary Jane and Black Cat are saved by S'ym.

=== The Secret of Paul Rabin ===
A few months after the ordeal in Limbo, Mary Jane prepares for a trip to the park with her family, when suddenly a blizzard hits the city. At the centre of the blizzard is a being the children identify as the "Scribble Man", MJ urges Paul to take the children to safety while she heads towards the scene of the disruption. Paul tells Mary Jane to 'remember how this all works' and promises to catch up with her once the children are safe. Mary Jane frantically calls Peter on the phone, telling him that 'he' has returned.

This individual is Benjamin Rabin, the emissary of the Mayan god of mischief Wayeb'. It is he who confronted Peter and MJ in their apartment at the close of the 'Beyond' event one year ago. After battling Spider-Man in New York, Rabin branded both Peter and Mary Jane with the mark of sacrifice and sent them into an alternate future, it is there that Peter and MJ met Paul. Paul explains Spider-Man is crucial to completing a ceremony that will enable Wayeb' to seize control of the Earth, he develops a device with which to transport him back to Earth, Peter insists Mary Jane go back, but when Wayeb' attacks them, Mary Jane triggers the teleportation device and sends Peter back, splintering Wayeb' in half. Mary Jane is left trapped in the other realm with Paul while Peter and what remains of Wayeb' crash down to Earth, creating the crater in Pennsylvania. Due to the alternative passage of time in Paul's dimension, Mary Jane spends four years there and she and Paul depend on one another for survival, ultimately adopting two young children, who Mary Jane names Romey Stephanie Watson and Owen Watson. Peter, with the aid of Norman Osborn, was able to return for them, only to find MJ unwilling to part with her new family. Unbeknownst to either MJ or Peter, this was due to a curse inflicted upon Mary Jane by Rabin, who prayed to his gods that MJ would, in time, come to 'accept the chains' that bind her. Peter eventually deduces that Paul is really the alternate universe son of Rabin the Emissary, Mary Jane reveals Paul confessed this to her, and that Paul is trying to make up for the part he played in helping his father lay waste to the world he came from. In the present, Rabin schemes the death of the 'scarlet woman' so that he may ascend to godhood. In the final battle with Rabin, Peter discovers Mary Jane has powers and Ms. Marvel dies protecting her from Rabin, who himself is killed by Wayeb's sprit for making the wrong sacrifice. Stephanie and Owen are revealed to be magical constructs created by Rabin, the "chains" which he spoke of, and vanish. Now unshackled, MJ grieves along with Peter and Paul.

Unwilling to live in their apartment without the children, Mary Jane and Paul move in with MJ's aunt Anna. Mary Jane and Peter soon mend their friendship yet again and Peter helps MJ with Anna's birthday celebrations. Unbeknownst to MJ, Orchis has laced her aunt's supply of Krakoan medicines with a kill code which turns Anna into a feral, murderous beast. Peter and MJ subdue Anna using MJ's sleeping pills and commit her to Ravencroft.

=== Debut as Jackpot ===
Coping with severe depression over the loss of Owen and Stephanie, Mary Jane is visited by Felicia Hardy, fresh off of ending her own relationship with Peter, she convinces MJ to use the technology of her special watch to help others in need. Felicia supplies Mary Jane with a costume. MJ hears a commotion outside and admits she finally understands Peter's mantra of how "with great power there must also come great responsibility". She heads out into the city as her new costumed alter ego Jackpot.

Shortly after, Mary Jane and Paul are approached by Norman Osborn who warns them that Peter Parker is on the hunt for them. Peter, having been infected with the sins of the former Green Goblin, attacks the two as they flee by car.

Mary Jane confronts Peter, who after realizing that she was the one who started the relationship with Paul, vengefully threatens to make her pay for betraying him. Peter then attempts to kill Paul who Mary Jane manages to rescue by utilizing the powers of her tech watch. When the Queen Goblin interferes and attempts to kill Peter, Mary Jane prevents the attack and protects him, which enables Norman and Kraven the Hunter to succeed in removing the sins from Peter. Upon the removal of the sins, a remorseful Peter is comforted by Mary Jane, who does not blame him for the ordeal they just went through, and the two finally begin to emotionally reconnect.

During the "Gang War" storyline, Mary Jane Watson as Jackpot helped Spider-Man and She-Hulk fight Menagerie members Armadillo and Man-Bull. Then she had a brief fight with Electro. Jackpot was among the heroes who helped Spider-Man, Miles Morales, She-Hulk, Spider-Woman, and Elektra fight Madame Masque.

Peter and Mary Jane later meet up at Ravencroft to visit MJ's aunt Anna, where they change out of their costumes around one another. Peter is able to give Anna the cure to the Orchis virus as Spider-Man. An orderly at Ravencroft asks if Peter and MJ are a couple, to which Peter replies that they are not. Anna privately tells the orderly she blames her niece for their break-up as Peter takes his leave. Peter and MJ spend a few days fighting crime together as partners and discussing their difficulties in moving on from one another. MJ, realizing she's not yet over him, tells Peter it is best not to team up together quite so regularly. Anna then begins to set Peter up with new blind dates. This leads Peter to start dating a Ravencroft nurse, Shay, although the two decide to be 'non-exclusive' because of Peter's unreliability.

Mary Jane continued to see Peter, inviting him over to have dinner with Paul and herself, and, despite her initial hesitation to team with Peter, she eventually relaxes this stance and again partners with him. Anna and Peter then arrange a double dinner date for the pair and their respective partners. After saving the city from an attack, MJ and Peter head on over to enjoy the date, but not before MJ lets Peter know how appreciative she is of his efforts to rescue her from Rabin's dimension. Peter indicates that things will "eventually" work out between them romantically, which MJ does not object to despite presently seeing someone else.

=== Venom War ===
Peter and MJ would again team together as their costumed alter-egos to deal with the escalating time-spanning conflict between Eddie Brock and Dylan Brock, leading to an outbreak of symbiotes. One such force opposed by Peter and Mary Jane in the crisis is the Arachniote, a powerful symbiote.

During the crisis, Peter finds himself bonded temporarily again with the original Venom symbiote. Venom continually critiques Mary Jane's choice of partner in Paul and reminds Peter of the pain and loss he still feels from Mary Jane's rejection of him. When Mary Jane is consumed by the Arachniote, Peter receives a vision from a possible future where Peter becomes the King in Black, the god of all symbiotes. Mary Jane triumphs over the Arachniote in a test of wills, leaving Paul and becoming Peter's queen.

The two end up having a daughter, May, who is driven away from her parents when Mary Jane is consumed by her power and dies, leaving a bitter Peter broken. Peter becomes a destructive force across the universe, and ultimately kills his and Mary Jane's daughter. The vision of the future ends, with the symbiote telling Pete that there are no eventualities in a timeline continually in flux. Reassured that this future may not come to pass, Peter vows to rescue Mary Jane from the Arachniote, despite Paul's warnings that Mary Jane may likely already be dead. Peter ultimately proves Paul wrong and links to the Arachniote itself to find Mary Jane alive. Meeting up within a psychic dreamscape, the two are able to work together to free themselves and defeat the creature. Peter congratulates Mary Jane for the victory and prepares to leave, to which she asks if he would stay with her to take in the previously defeated Hobgoblin. Peter suggests that she should share the victory with the person she loves instead and leaves, with Mary Jane left looking longingly at him.

=== All-New Venom ===
When Peter finds his secret identity compromised and is blackmailed by a crime lord, he turns to Mary Jane for advice, who suggests that perhaps it is time for him to make something of himself beyond Spider-Man, while berating him that he only became a superhero out of grief for losing his uncle and needs to finally grow up. An irate Peter retorts that Mary Jane only became a superhero herself due to grieving the loss of two children that were never real. Mary Jane admits to Peter that her stint as Jackpot is only temporary while she deals with her grief, but argues that it does not have to be a permanent tenure for him, to which he argues he could not live with himself if someone died because he gave up, and walks out of her apartment. Due to absorbing erratic cosmic powers, Peter would later have a near death experience where he would view all of the realities in the multiverse where he and Mary Jane are still together and have raised several families.

Sometime later, Mary Jane and Paul take in Dylan Brock as he tries to figure out the identity of a new Venom symbiote host, while Mary Jane's experience with the Arachniote has given Paul further cause for concern, causing he and MJ to have fights over her continued activities as Jackpot. The fights are furthered during a heated argument between Paul and Dylan at the dinner table one evening, with MJ pulling Paul aside to remind him of the traumas Dylan has gone through in recent months, Paul argues that trauma is just an excuse for Dylan's unruly behaviour. Paul brings up that MJ has been failing to attend couples counselling, Dylan overhears them and encourages both of them to break up, before belittling Paul for his lack of intelligence and common sense in failing to detect the children he and MJ both cared for were illusions.

On March 31, 2025, it was announced on Marvel's official website that Mary Jane was the new host of the Venom symbiote, and that the reveal would happen in the pages of All-New Venom #5. It is then explained that during the Venom War, at Mary Jane's demand, the symbiote hacked her Jackpot gauntlet to give her the power to overcome the Arachniote, leaving a sliver of itself in it. However, as the symbiote started to die, it caused the device to glitch, leaving Mary Jane with multiple forms and a skull with each turn. Believing the symbiote was trying to use this as a means of hurting Peter, she confronts the symbiote, with two skulls rolling and causing her skin to melt, culminating in her starting to disintegrate once all three skulls are rolled. Venom and MJ can no longer separate, as they are keeping each other alive.

Robbie agrees to be MJ's secret keeper. Paul in the meantime becomes frustrated at the lack of trust, it also means he cannot be 'intimate' any longer with MJ with the symbiote present. He guilts MJ for not being truthful with him. MJ then gets a phone call from Flash who informs her he has to bring Dylan in per S.C.A.R.'s new conditions, and that she has to fight him over it.

As her family life falls apart, Mary Jane's thoughts begin to turn to Peter and how he is doing. She soon learns of Peter's battle with the demigod Hellgate and grows concerned.

A few weeks later, at Aunt May's request, Mary Jane goes to check up on Peter. She tells him that she was always his friend despite what happened between them and wanted to be there for him as much as she wanted to, but he avoided her. She respected his wishes and kept her distance, but now she needs him in her life again and reveals her bond to Venom. Peter, seemingly still hurt by Mary Jane leaving him for Paul, rejects her by stating that her and Venom deserve each other and leaves. Peter is eventually revealed to be Ben Reilly impersonating him, the real Peter having been sent into space, with Mary Jane once again failing to recognize an imposter.

Following a battle with Doctor Octopus, Mary Jane returns home, where Paul informs her that Dylan has figured out her identity and is not on speaking terms with either of them, feeling betrayed and deceived. Paul attempts to apologize for his own recent behaviour, promising he will change and do better, and that he is confident they can make their relationship work. Mary Jane, however, admits to Paul that nothing between them has been working for a considerable while now, and proceeds to break up with him. Venom editor Jordan D. White would later reveal in an interview with Adventures In Poor Taste that Mary Jane's relationship with Paul was based on trauma bonding that proved unsustainable once they were settled in a safer world environment compared to the dimension she had been stranded in with him.

MJ later has a heart to heart with the symbiote, during which she refers to Peter as her 'boyfriend' and questions why the symbiote still carries a torch for Eddie Brock. She and the Symbiote also briefly discuss the nature of their relationship with Flash Thompson. MJ checks in on Flash and Rick Jones shortly afterwards, finding that Rick has become the new host of the symbiote Toxin. At this point, All New Venom ended, with the title reverting to legacy numbering and its original title of Venom with issue #250.

=== Death Spiral ===
Peter eventually learns of Mary Jane's connection to Venom and the two team with Flash, Eddie and Dylan to battle the supervillain Torment, who murders Paul as he tries to protect Dylan. When Torment threatens Mary Jane's loved ones, including Peter, she allows him to fall to his death. Peter and Mary Jane attend Paul's funeral and from there finally talk things over, with Mary Jane revealing she sought solace with Paul because she feared Peter had died and would not come back for her. The two agree to take their reconciliation slowly and stay on friendly terms until both are ready to be together again. Mary Jane then enlists the help of Peter, Tony Stark, and other heroes to battle the Queen in Black, Hela, as she and her armies attack the Earth.

=== Friendly Neighbourhood Mary Jane ===
In the pages of the 60th anniversary one-shot Face It Tiger, it was revealed Mary Jane will part ways with the Venom symbiote and take on the role of a film producer, though the symbiote has left her a piece of itself that she uses to defend herself.

== Powers and abilities ==
For most of her publication history, Mary Jane had no superpowers, and was simply a talented model, actress, and businesswoman. After her experiences in another world, Mary Jane returned with technology that allowed her to tap into special abilities, with the catch that her abilities can be random, ranging from gaining superhuman physical abilities to basically becoming living silly putty.

== Cultural impact and legacy ==
=== Critical reception ===
Mike Avila of Syfy called Mary Jane "incredibly popular", saying, "The redheaded girl-next-door — who was teased, but not seen, throughout Spider-Man's early years — made the greatest entrance in comic book history in the last page of Amazing Spider-Man #42. The John Romita Sr.-drawn panel introduced a vivacious redhead (based on Ann Margaret, incidentally) who would eventually become not just the most important person in Peter Parker's world, but a comics superstar on her own. No other powerless Marvel character holds a candle to MJ. Not Nick Fury, not Jarvis, not Sharon Carter, not even Aunt May." Cole Kennedy of CBR.com wrote, "In a panel that would be recreated in Spider-Man comics for decades to come, Mary Jane makes her first full appearance with the famous line: "Face it, tiger, you just hit the jackpot." From that moment on, Mary Jane was entangled in the crazy web of Spider-Man's life. She's become one of the most popular and recognizable characters in Marvel Comics, starring in several of her own comic book series. If fans look to Marvel's multiverse, they'll find many fascinating versions of MJ, including some who've developed superpowers themselves." Darby Harn of Screen Rant asserted, "Mary Jane Watson has been one of the most significant characters in the world of Spider-Man since her debut and has grown far beyond the standard girlfriend or damsel in distress stock figure that was common in comics at the time of her inception in the 1960s. Her greatest comic book stories have shown her to be one of the most independent and courageous characters in the Marvel Universe."

=== Accolades ===
- In 2014, ComicBook.com ranked Mary Jane 2nd in their "7 Best Female Characters from the Spider-Man Multiverse" list.
- In 2019, CBR.com ranked Mary Jane 10th in their "Spider-Man: His 10 Best Sidekicks" list.
- In 2022, The A.V. Club ranked Mary Jane 36th in their "100 best Marvel characters" list.
- In 2022, CBR.com ranked Mary Jane 3rd in their "Most Wholesome Spider-Man Characters" list and ranked her and Peter Parker 3rd in their "10 Best Marvel Couples" list.

== Literary reception ==
=== Amazing Mary Jane - 2019 ===
According to Diamond Comic Distributors, Amazing Mary Jane #1 was the 6th best selling comic book in October 2019.

Mike Fugue of CBR.com ranked Amazing Mary Jane #1 2nd in their "Comics You Need To Read This Week" list, stating, "The Amazing Mary Jane #1 is a smart, topical, and often hilarious debut starring everyone's favorite redhead, in her very first solo series. Leah Williams' script shines and balances lighthearted quips with serious social commentary masterfully. Carlos Gomez's artwork is gorgeous and while he doesn't get an opportunity to illustrate larger-than-life battles, there is an urgency to his visual pacing and still manages to pull off show-stopping panels. This book is a lot of fun and manages to be so without feeling too twee."

=== Mary Jane & Black Cat: Beyond - 2022 ===
According to Diamond Comic Distributors, Mary Jane & Black Cat: Beyond #1 was the 21st best selling comic book in January 2022.

Sayantan Gayen of CBR.com referred to Mary Jane & Black Cat: Beyond #1 as a "thrilling tale peppered with drama and intrigue," writing, "It is not an exaggeration to say that Mary Jane & Black Cat: Beyond #1 features one of the best Marvel crossovers in recent history. Jed MacKay writes an equally beautiful team-up of Black Cat and Ben Reilly in the Death of Doctor Strange: Spider-Man #1. Mary Jane and Black Cat may look at each other as romantic rivals, but the instant bonding between the two and the comfort they feel in each other's company is heartwarmingly beautiful to see. Mary Jane & Black Cat: Beyond #1 is an enthralling and charming tale."

== Other versions ==
=== Age of X ===
When the Anti-Mutant group known as the Human Coalition decided to also target the Mutates, Peter send his pregnant wife Mary Jane away to France to ensure her safety.

=== The Amazing Spider-Man: The Daily Comic Strip ===
As a major character in the comic strip version of The Amazing Spider-Man, Mary Jane was a prominent character, flirting with Peter and serving as a persistent love interest. Mary Jane spent many years of the strip employed at a computer store. Peter would propose to Mary Jane several times in the strip only for her to reject these advances. Unlike her 616 variant, Mary Jane did not have existing knowledge of Peter's dual identity, only finding out when Peter finally confessed during the 1986 run of comic strips. Peter would propose to Mary Jane once again but she feared accepting would mean they would have children that could be afflicted with side-effects from Peter's radioactive blood, and rejected the proposal. Mary Jane briefly departed New York but eventually returned, fully prepared to leave Peter behind once and for all after becoming envious of the attention he was receiving from another woman. Peter assured Mary Jane his heart was always set on her and proposed one more time, this time Mary Jane accepted and they quickly eloped. Peter would then reveal the origin of his powers and the reason he fights crime to her, making her his total confidante. Peter and MJ would remain married for the duration of the newspaper strip's run, eventually heading off to settle in Australia at its climax in 2019 following the death of Stan Lee.

=== The Amazing Spider-Man: Renew Your Vows ===
Mary Jane Watson on the cover of The Amazing Spider-Man: Renew Your Vows (vol. 2) #1 (October 2016). Art by Stanley Lau.

Following on from the events of Secret Wars, where deadly incursions have laid waste to most of the multiverse, Battleworld, a planet composed of the remains of alternate realities, is created by Doctor Doom and Doctor Strange, with each reality on the world divided into different domains. In this domain called the Regency, Mary Jane is married to Peter and they have a daughter named Annie May Parker. Spider-Man is seemingly the only hero left in the domain after Regent kills the Avengers and establishes himself as ruler of the domain, with Peter opting to retire as Spider-Man to raise Annie and live up to his vows as a father. Peter does not fight Regent initially to protect his family from Venom and ends up killing Eddie Brock in the process at Mary Jane's request.

Eight years later, Mary Jane is still struggling as an actress, while her husband is forced to make money off of photos he cannot publish for fear of making Regent's forces look bad. Mary Jane takes Annie to school and instructs her not to reveal her powers in public even if the situation calls for it. However, they are forced to confront Regent eventually and stand their ground with some of the remaining heroes. After Annie gains a costume and assists her father in combat, Mary Jane obtains armor that acts similarly to Regent's tech which drained the powers of heroes to make him stronger to assist her family. She and Peter defeat the tyrant and resume their peaceful family life with Annie.

In the follow-up series, Mary Jane uses a modified version of the armor she used in the fight against Regent, which now replicates Spider-Man's powers and allows her to assist her family as Spinneret. However, every time she taps into Peter's powers, it weakens him significantly. She now operates her own clothing store in addition to being a mother and superhero.

The Parker family of this world finally meet the Peter Parker of Earth-616 in the 2018 event Spider-Geddon. Peter suggests they look after the now infant and helpless Inheritors, but the Parkers stress to him that taking care of one kid is enough. The adventure also reveals their daughter Annie is part of the Spider-Scroll prophecy, the "Pattern Maker".

=== Earth X ===
In this reality, Mary Jane ended up contracting cancer prior to the Terrigen Mists unlocking the Celestial Seed inside of humanity, which granted the entire species superhuman abilities. She died shortly afterward, but later reappeared as an illusion cast by the Spiders-Man to Peter. She also took care of a younger version of May, who would be bonded with a symbiote in a few years' time.

=== Exiles ===
In Exiles, Mary Jane is Spider-Woman, a member of the Avengers. Mary Jane is a lesbian who fell in love with the reality-hopping Sunfire. The two enjoy a romantic relationship, albeit one interrupted by Sunfire's dimensional jumping responsibilities. The main threat these Avengers face is Phalanx-versions of most of their friends and millions of innocent humans. Sunfire manages to return to Mary Jane for some time, although none of their friends know how long this will be. They resolve to enjoy whatever time they have left, which ends when dimensional energies snatch Sunfire away again during an almost shared bath.

=== House of M ===
The 2005 House of M crossover series version of Mary Jane is depicted as an actress, and she is one of the few humans tolerated by mutants. She has co-starred in films with Spider-Man, who had the false belief that he was a mutant.

=== Incredible Hercules ===
In alternate universe where the Amazonia conquered the world and the females became the dominant gender, Mary Jane was a female version of Spider-Man wearing an identical costume to Spider-Girl and was part of the Avengers, which consisted of Spider-Woman (Mary Jane), Ms. Fantastic (Sue Storm), White Phoenix (Jean Grey) and Wolverine (Laura Kinney).

=== Infinity Wars ===
During the "Infinity Wars" storyline when the universe was folded in half, Mary Jane is fused with Marlene Alraune. She is the assistant of Peter Spector (Arachknight), who is the CEO of his company. Sometimes she aids him in some occasions, since she knows his secret identity.

=== King-Sized Spider-Man Summer Special ===
Mary Jane plays a starring role in Un-Enchanted Evening, a 23-page out-of-continuity short story in the King-Sized Spider-Man Summer Special. In the tale, MJ and her friends Millie the Model and Patsy Walker accidentally end up in the middle of a plot by Enchantress to kidnap and brainwash Clea, She-Hulk, Jean Grey, Scarlet Witch, and Patsy, turning them into her personal army. In the final confrontation between the heroines and Enchantress, MJ and Millie save the day when they distract her long enough for Clea to magically bind and gag her, effectively neutralizing her spell-casting abilities.

=== Mangaverse ===
In the Marvel Mangaverse, Mary Jane Watson is Spider-Woman, a new initiate into the Spider-clan (of ninjas), with her boyfriend (Peter Parker) showing her the ropes. In the 2005-'06 New Mangaverse five part limited series, they join several other heroes in combating a superhero massacre. They are also among the last surviving heroes at the end of the series.

=== Marvel 1602 ===
Marvel 1602, an eight-issue limited series set in the Elizabethan era, was published in 2003. Its popularity led to the publication of two sequels: 1602: New World and Spider-Man: 1602. The character of Marion Jane Watsonne is introduced in Spider-Man: 1602 #3. The Watsonne family are a theatrical troupe, from the same village in Scotland as Peter Parquagh. Marion, an actress, must pose as a boy in England, because women are not allowed on the stage. In France, where Peter sees her, she is under no such restrictions. Marion encounters Peter when he saves the life of her brother, Graeme. After a brief stint as the troupe's acrobat, Peter is kidnapped by Baron Octavius (this reality's version of Doctor Octopus). When he escapes, he discovers the troupe has been hired by Octavius and moved to Vienna. With her family locked in the dungeon and herself being used as bait to lure Peter into a trap, Marion and Peter are reunited. After a violent battle with several 1602 versions of the Green Goblin, the Lizard, and Bullseye, the two find happiness with each other and presumably wed.

=== Marvel Universe vs The Punisher ===
After her husband becomes the first infected in an exposure of a chemical that turns humans into cannibalistic brutes, Mary Jane and Aunt May try to take refuge at a safe haven offered by a priest, though she is kidnapped by Stilt-Man. Through unknown means she is eventually returned to the side of Spider-Man (now dubbed 'Patient Zero') and joins his tribe, despite not being infected. After a few years she becomes pregnant with Patient Zero's child; late in her pregnancy she is abducted by the Kingpin and taken hostage. Patient Zero sends the Punisher to rescue her, but he is captured and tortured for the location of Patient Zero. Mary Jane threatens to kill herself so that she will not reveal Patient Zero's location, but the Kingpin calls her bluff. Eventually Deadpool creates a distraction that allows her to free Punisher, who annihilates all of the cannibals and kills Kingpin. Mary Jane is reunited with Patient Zero, but is left distraught when Punisher kills him. Grieving, she is sent away from Manhattan by Punisher.

=== Marvel Zombies and Marvel Zombies Return ===
In Marvel Zombies, an infected Peter Parker arrives home to save Mary Jane and Aunt May but he loses control and eats them instead. After he has eaten, Peter is consumed by the guilt and grief of what he has done to the last two people who ever loved him, refusing to take off his mask so he will not have to look himself in the eyes again. This guilt is a major plot point. Marvel Zombies Return: Spider-Man reveals that MJ was zombified after Peter ate her. She reappears in an alternative reality and is later seen being eaten by a zombified Sinister Six that the original zombie Spider-Man accidentally created when he succumbed to his hunger while trying to stop his enemies.

=== MC2 ===
Mary Jane Watson on the cover of Amazing Spider-Girl #8.

In the MC2 universe, which depicts an alternative future timeline for the Marvel Universe, Mary Jane remains married to Peter Parker. Peter's original clone Kaine reunited Mary Jane with her baby daughter in this continuity. Kaine had found the child living with agents of Norman Osborn. Mary Jane's daughter became Spider-Girl, alias Mayday Parker. Many years later, after a complicated pregnancy, Mary Jane would give birth to a baby son, Benjamin. She is a respected fashion designer and businesswoman, secretly opening a store selling Spider-Girl related merchandise to pay for May's and Ben's educations. Mary Jane later becomes a guidance counselor at May's school, where she learns of the anti-mutant group Humanity First. She also becomes a mother figure to April Parker, an unstable symbiotic clone of Mayday, for a time.

During the Spider-Verse event, the Parkers come under attack from Daemos, brother to Morlun, and a member of a powerful dimension-hopping family of parasites called Inheritors, who, like Morlun, feed on the animal totems of the living. As Daemos brings the Parker home crashing down around them, Mary Jane hands over Benjamin to her daughter and instructs her to keep him safe, while she elects to stay behind and assist her husband in delaying the Inheritor. Mary Jane is heard to scream off-panel as Mayday evacuates the house with her brother. Peter is shown to have been killed by Daemos. Mayday is saved by other Spider-Men from alternate realities who have been trying to rescue as many Spiders as possible from the Inheritors, and she vows to kill Daemos and avenge her fallen family. It is later revealed Benjy is the "scion" sought after by the Inheritors who will play a major part in a prophecy that will lead to their defeat. Ultimately, Benjy is rescued and Mayday instead shows mercy to the Inheritors when she is presented with an opportunity to slay that family's own father Solus.. Peter is eventually resurrected by The Other in the 2018 Spidergeddon event and is reunited with Mary Jane and the family.

=== New Fantastic Four ===
One of the Ages of Apocalypse created when Apocalypse warped the main universe, on this universe where the X-Men, Fantastic Four, Avengers and Doctor Doom were almost killed, Mary Jane is married to Peter, who is a member of the New Fantastic Four along with Wolverine, Hulk, Ghost Rider. She and Peter also have a daughter named May.

=== Peter Porker, the Spectacular Spider-Ham ===
Peter Porker, the Spectacular Spider-Ham, Tom DeFalco and Mark Armstrong's anthropomorphic parody of Spider-Man, features Mary Jane Waterbuffalo and Mary Crane Watsow, two separate unrelated red-haired women whom Peter Porker has dated at different times in his life. While Mary Crane Watsow was created for an MC2 equivalent future (Earth-90424) as the mother of Swiney-Girl, she was later introduced in the modernity of Earth-8311 as a separate character from Mary Jane Waterbuffalo, Porker's primary love interest, establishing Porker to regularly date redheads named Mary.

=== Silver Surfer: Requiem ===
In the reality where Silver Surfer died due to coating breaking down, Mary Jane is seen where she is still married to Peter.

=== Sinister 60th ===
In the distant future, Mary Jane has booked a dinner for Peter on his 60th birthday, something she arranges every year, but every year he usually arrives late due to commitments to crime fighting. Peter communicates with MJ as he battles a new, younger Vulture, the two sharing a bit of banter, before Peter cuts her off to prevent a mugging. Mary Jane continues to wait for Peter until the restaurant prepares to close, she then learns on the news that Peter was shot while preventing the mugging and left for dead. She heads out to the hospital where she finds a great deal of New York have paid Peter a visit to show their gratitude. Mary Jane finally gets her turn to see him and they flirt some more before sharing a kiss, Mary Jane whispers something in Peter's ear, which Peter interprets as all the times she's saved him. Peter later leaves the ward to prevent another mugging, with Mary Jane angrily telling him to get back to bed. The medical staff all figure out that they are married, but are advised not to confirm it outright. Mary Jane and Peter return to their apartment that they share with their pet dog Daily, where Mary Jane admits to Peter that she ate his birthday cake, just as she does every year.

=== Spectacular Spider-Man magazine ===
In the UK based Spectacular Spider-Man Magazine, which is aimed at considerably younger readers, Mary Jane is Peter's love interest, but possesses no existing knowledge of his dual identity. A look into the future revealed she eventually marries Peter and has a daughter with him, Mayday, who is active as Spider-Girl. This is the third official continuity to incorporate Spider-Girl into the mythology (besides Earth X and the Spider-Girl title).

=== Spider-Gwen ===
In Edge of Spider-Verse #2 and the ongoing Spider-Gwen series, Mary Jane (MJ) of Earth-65 is shown to be the lesbian leader of a band called the Mary Janes, of which Gwen is a member. The band becomes a national sensation via downloads, though due to Gwen's double-life as Spider-Woman, inner-turmoil strikes the band. After a failed search for a new drummer to replace Gwen, Mary Jane and fellow band member and girlfriend Glory beg her to come back. Eventually, she starts to suspect that Gwen is Spider-Woman, but her bandmates dismiss her claims. Her theory is proven correct when Gwen reveals her identity to them, and on breaking up with Glory, struggles with her feelings for Gwen, who is oblivious to MJ being in love with her.

During the King in Black crossover, MJ was summoned to the 616-universe when Gwen attempted to return to her own reality from an attack by Knull as a result of the Jackal capturing the Mary Janes and bonding a sample of Gwen's symbiote with her. Upon arriving, she is bonded to one of the symbiotes taking control of the city and becomes Carnage, with Knull easily taking over her mind due to her repressed feelings towards Gwen. Gwen eventually defeats her and returns her home after Knull's attack, not knowing that part of the symbiote is still inside MJ. During a tour with Dazzler, MJ is kidnapped by Bruce Banner, who uses gamma radiation to reawaken Carnage within her and confess her feelings to Gwen. When she begins turning back into Carnage during fits of anger, she leaves Gwen and the band to go with Natasha Romanoff and find a way to control the symbiote.

=== Spider-Island ===
In the Secret Wars Battleworld version of Spider-Island, Mary Jane, Carlie Cooper, Betty Brant, and Sharon Carter were mutated into spider monsters by the Spider Queen and were used as bait for the resistance, as they also had bombs and tracking devices implanted in them. Spider-Man, Agent Venom, and Iron Goblin manage to subdue them and use Curt Connors' Lizard formula to mutate them into reptilian humanoids which freed them from the Spider Queen's control while the Vision removed the bombs from them just before they exploded.

=== Spider-Man: Fairy Tales ===
Issue #1 of Spider-Man: Fairy Tales mimics the fairy tale of Little Red Riding Hood. In this version of the fairy tale, Mary Jane's character mimics that of Little Red Riding Hood, and Peter is one of the woodsmen. Peter is not very strong but he is fast, agile, and "can climb better than most anyone." Working together, Peter and Mary Jane manage to kill the evil wolf. The two later become engaged.

In issue #4, a gender-reversed version of Cinderella, Mary Jane is a servant girl in the house of Sir Osborn, and is in love with Peter Parker. Peter, in the Cinderella role, does not realize this and disguises himself as the "Prince of Arachne" to win the hand of Princess Gwendolyn. Mary Jane discovers Peter's secret identity and aids him.

=== Spider-Man: Clone Saga ===
In this alternate take on the Clone Saga, Mary Jane and Aunt May are infected by virus from the Jackal, but thankfully are cured by Peter and Ben Reilly when near death. Mary Jane later gives birth to their daughter May, but Alison Mongrain kidnaps the baby. Luckily the baby is returned to them.

=== Spider-Man: Life Story ===
Spider-Man: Life Story features an alternate continuity where the characters naturally age after Peter Parker becomes Spider-Man in 1962. In 1977, Mary Jane is Harry Osborn's fiancée and runs a discothèque called "Studio 54". When Peter attends one night to support her, she drunkenly lashes out at him for not taking action in his personal life after he questions her relationship with Harry, revealing that she knew Peter was Spider-Man in the process. A year later, Harry breaks up with her and leaves her with a massive fortune after he accidentally killed Peter's wife, Gwen Stacy. After Peter and Gwen's clones leave New York to begin a new life, she comforts Peter in his apartment.

By 1984, she is now married to Peter and gave birth to two twins named Benjamin and Claire. She grows intolerable of Peter's absences as Spider-Man as she takes care of the twins and the elderly May around the time where Peter acquires the black suit. After Peter nearly lets the symbiote take over him while attacking Kraven, she leaves him and takes the twins with her. For the next 11 years, she raises the twins as a single mother in Portland while Peter continues to be CEO of Parker Industries and Spider-Man in New York. After he allows his clone Ben Reilly to take over his life in 1995, he returns to her and the children.

In 2006, Peter returns to New York shortly after Morlun kills Ben to draw the vampire out to him and prevent Tony Stark from taking over his company. As Iron Man forces Peter to participate in the Civil War, Morlun arrives at the Parker residence in Portland and attacks the Parker family. After Benjamin deduces that Morlun is vulnerable when feeding off life force, he allows Morlun to briefly feed of him to protect his mother and allow Claire the chance to impale the vampire on a tree. While he survived the encounter, Morlun's attack cripples him for life. In 2019, an elderly Mary Jane and their children unknowingly say goodbye to Peter for the last time before he goes into space and save the world from Doctor Doom's reign, which costs him his life. During his final moments, he imagines Mary Jane telling him everything will turn out fine, and he calls her his "jackpot". Shortly after Peter's funeral, Mary Jane meets with the new Spider-Man, Miles Morales, and gives him Peter's original suit to give the hero a "fresh start" after Otto Octavius took control of his body.

=== Spider-Man: Reign ===
In the alternative future seen in Spider-Man: Reign, Mary Jane died of terminal disease due to prolonged exposure to Peter's radioactive body fluids. After her death, Peter buried his red and blue costume with her, wearing a black suit until his retirement. However, with the coming of the Sinner Six (and thanks to some encouragement from the tentacles of the now-deceased Doctor Octopus), Peter reclaims his original suit from Mary Jane's coffin and returns to his life as Spider-Man. After the Six are defeated and the WEBB surrounding New York is destroyed, Peter visits Mary Jane's grave, assuring her that he will be with her again some day, but, for now, he still has his responsibility. In an alternative past then seen in Spider-Man: Reign 2, on travelling back in time to kill his younger self to prevent MJ's death, Peter creates an alternate timeline where MJ joins with Venom to avenge her Peter, targeting other older Peters who continue to return from their futures to the already-changed past via paradoxes.

=== Spider-Man Loves Mary Jane ===
In Spider-Man Loves Mary Jane, Mary Jane is still a teenager and the book is primarily a teen drama rather than a superhero comic book, although it takes place in a superhero universe with Spider-Man playing a prominent role. In this continuity, Mary Jane is the most popular girl at Midtown High (her high school in Queens, NY) and even has the title of homecoming queen. She is briefly infatuated with Spider-Man and the two go on a date. After their date, she realizes that she would much rather be with Peter Parker. The ongoing series was preceded by two four-issue limited series, Mary Jane and Mary Jane: Homecoming, intended to appeal to female manga readers and the fans of the Mary Jane novels.

=== Spider-Man never existed ===
In a world where Peter Parker had never existed, everyone who had known him in the main universe appears more successful, with Mary Jane becoming a successful actress and starring in the blockbuster film Rescue.

=== Spider-Verse ===
Several versions of Mary Jane appear in the "Spider-Verse" storyline:

- In Edge of Spider-Verse #4, Sarah Jane the next-door neighbor of Patton Parnell (the universe's Peter Parker).
- In Earth-001, the Inheritors home dimension, Mary Jane Watson appears as a Great Hall Guard.

=== Superman/Spider-Man ===
In Superman/Spider-Man, within a 1960s-era universe inhabited by the heroes of both the Marvel and DC Universes, Mary Jane is depicted as dating Peter Parker at the same time as Felicia Hardy, with the trio going out on a date together.

=== Ultimate Marvel ===
Mary Jane Watson of Earth-1610 (Ultimate Marvel), art by Mark Bagley.

This version of Mary Jane, first appearing in Ultimate Spider-Man #1, attends Midtown High School with Peter Parker and Liz Allan. Known as "Mary" to her friends, she later picks up the "MJ" nickname. Unlike the original MJ, Ultimate Mary Jane is a brilliant student and expresses her true feelings instead of masquerading as a party girl. She has an eruptive temper and has even physically attacked some of the bullies at her school, resulting in a detention. At one time, MJ had expressed her wish to become an actress, then a "teacher who cares". She now has an interest in journalism. She and Peter begin dating in Ultimate Spider-Man #13. In that issue she becomes the second person to learn of Peter's secret identity and the first Peter reveals it to. She mends Peter's spare Spider-Man costumes, once calling herself the Betsy Ross of superheroes. Although Peter and MJ love each other very much, Peter's Spider-Man identity places a strain on their relationship. The relationship is further complicated when Gwen Stacy enters their lives.

As part of the Clone Saga arc, MJ is kidnapped from her bedroom by a clone of Peter Parker who is determined to give her powers so that she is no longer in danger from his enemies. He pumps in her bloodstream an unquantified amount of the formula OZ. Upon learning this, she becomes very angry and transforms into a red goblin-like creature. When the real Peter Parker and Spider-Woman show up, she calms down and resumes her original form. MJ is given a cure for the OZ formula, but is left traumatized and worries that she will transform again.

Mary Jane decides to actively pursue a career in broadcast journalism, and she begins a series of on-location webcast reports in New York with Peter as her cameraman. She constantly messes up her surname, causing her to lose her temper, much to Peter's amusement. She eventually helps Kitty Pryde track down Peter when he is captured and unmasked by Shocker.

In the six months since the events of Ultimatum, Peter and Mary Jane have once again broken up and become estranged. Mary Jane especially has become withdrawn and consumed in her work for the school webcast. Although Peter was now in a relationship with Gwen Stacy, he and MJ started to repair their friendship. Gwen eventually broke up with Peter, realizing he loved MJ more. Her appearance has also drastically changed as she now has much shorter hair and wears glasses. She would gradually ditch this look as she and Peter reunited as a couple. Peter would later seemingly perish in battle with Norman Osborn and the Sinister Six while saving his Aunt May's life. Mary Jane contemplated writing a tell-all exposé on how Fury had failed Peter after his death, but abandoned the idea when she saw Fury's genuine remorse at how he had failed to protect Peter.

It is eventually revealed that Peter somehow survived his fateful ordeal, waking up in an abandoned lab in San Francisco. Peter made his way back to New York and reunited with Mary Jane. The two dug up his grave to find no body in the casket. After reuniting with Aunt May and Gwen, and meeting up with Miles Morales, Peter helped his successor confront Norman Osborn, who indicated his OZ formula had effectively granted any infused with it immortality, himself and Peter included. Upon defeating Osborn, Peter elects to leave New York, with Mary Jane deciding to travel with him, and the two depart the city in her family car.

During the Secret Wars (2015) event and the tie-in Ultimate End, the Ultimate Universe was destroyed by a reality-breaking Incursion and formed part of the patchwork planet Battleworld. At the conclusion of the 2017 event Spider-Men II, it is revealed that the Ultimate Universe had been restored to the multiverse and that Peter has returned to New York with Mary Jane and had now fully reestablished himself as Spider-Man.

=== Ultimate Universe ===
In the Ultimate Universe, Peter Parker is not bitten by the radioactive spider due to the Maker's interference. Peter ends up marrying Mary Jane, with whom he has two children named Richard and May, and does not receive powers until he is an adult.

=== What If? ===
Different versions of Mary Jane appear in the different stories of What If:

- A widowed Mary Jane appears in What If? Kraven killed Spider-Man.
- In What If? House of M, where Scarlet Witch removed the powers of all superheroes, Mary Jane is happily married to Peter and the two conceive their daughter May, who would later become a mother herself.
- In What If? The Fantastic Four were killed by De'Lila the New Fantastic Four composed of Spider-Man, Hulk, Wolverine and Ghost Rider have stayed together and moved to Four Freedoms, where Peter's wife Mary Jane became its homemaker.
- In What If? Avengers lost the Operation Galactic Storm, Mary Jane was one of the many countless people killed by the Kree empire.

== In other media ==
=== Television ===
Mary Jane Watson as she appears in Spider-Man (1994).

- Mary Jane Watson appears in the Spider-Man (1967) episode "The Big Brainwasher", voiced by Peg Dixon. This version is the niece of police captain Ned Stacy.
- Mary Jane Watson appears in Spider-Man: The Animated Series, voiced by Sara Ballantine. She first meets Peter Parker in the episode "The Return of the Spider-Slayers" after May Parker sets Peter up on a blind date. At the time, Peter's primary love interest was Felicia Hardy and he did not look forward to meeting Mary Jane, but is left speechless upon meeting her. In the third-season finale, the Green Goblin discovers Spider-Man's secret identity, kidnaps Mary Jane, and takes her to the George Washington Bridge. Spider-Man tries to save her, but she falls into an interdimensional portal created by the Goblin's stolen time dilation accelerator and is presumed dead. In the fourth season, she seemingly resurfaces alive before resuming her relationship with Peter, who eventually reveals his secret identity and proposes to her. In the fifth season, Mary Jane and Peter subsequently marry, but she is kidnapped by Hydro-Man. While in captivity, Mary Jane discovers she possesses water-based powers like her abductor and that they are unstable clones created by Miles Warren. Soon after, Mary Jane and Hydro-Man's bodies break down and disintegrate, but Madame Web reveals to Spider-Man that she knows where the real Mary Jane is. In the series finale "Farewell, Spider-Man", Madame Web promises to help Spider-Man find her.
  - Mary Jane Watson makes a non-speaking cameo appearance in the X-Men '97 three-part episode "Tolerance is Extinction".
- Mary Jane Watson appears in Spider-Man Unlimited (1999), voiced by Jennifer Hale.
- Mary Jane Watson appears in Spider-Man: The New Animated Series, voiced by Lisa Loeb. This version is the on-and-off girlfriend of Peter Parker and has shorter hair than other incarnations due to production-related difficulties related to rendering long hair at the time.
- Mary Jane Watson appears in The Spectacular Spider-Man, voiced by Vanessa Marshall. Introduced in the episode "The Invisible Hand", she takes part in an arranged date to Midtown High's Fall Formal set up by May Parker, which Peter initially dreads before he meets Mary Jane face-to-face.
- Mary Jane Watson, based on the Ultimate Marvel incarnation, appears in Ultimate Spider-Man (2012), voiced by Tara Strong. This version is the childhood best friend of Peter Parker, friend of Harry Osborn and Flash Thompson, and an aspiring journalist who dreams of reforming Daily Bugle Communications and rehabilitating Spider-Man's reputation due to J. Jonah Jameson's slander. For the first two seasons, she initially believes that Peter and Spider-Man are separate individuals and attends Midtown High School as a student. In the fourth season, while Spider-Man, Captain America, and the former's fellow S.H.I.E.L.D. trainees combat the Carnage symbiote, Mary Jane joins Cloak and Dagger in traveling to Midtown High to help evacuate New York's citizens, but is transformed into the Carnage Queen and given a mind control device built by Hydra agent Michael Morbius. Spider-Man, the Patrioteer, and Agent Venom encounter and subsequently fight her before Spider-Man destroys the mind control device. After the Carnage Queen attacks Morbius, the three heroes reveal their secret identities to her, allowing Mary Jane to regain control and break free of the Carnage symbiote, though traces of it remain within her. Curt Connors later experiments on Mary Jane, allowing her to gain control of her symbiote and become Spider-Woman to help the Web Warriors fight the Spider-Slayers before joining the S.H.I.E.L.D. Academy as a new student.
  - The Marvel Noir incarnation of Mary Jane appears in the episodes "The Spider-Verse" and "Return to the Spider-Verse", also voiced by Strong. This version is Spider-Man Noir's ally who is later killed while saving civilians caught in a gang war between Joe Fixit and Hammerhead's gangs.
- Mary Jane Watson appears in Spider-Man (2017), voiced by Felicia Day.
- Mary Jane Watson, based on the Spider-Gwen incarnation, appears in Marvel Rising: Battle of the Bands, voiced again by Tara Strong.
- Mary Jane Watson appears in Lego Marvel Spider-Man: Vexed by Venom, voiced again by Tara Strong.

=== Film ===
- Mary Jane Watson appears in Sam Raimi's Spider-Man film trilogy (2002–2007), portrayed by Kirsten Dunst.
  - First appearing in Spider-Man (2002), this version is Peter Parker's childhood and high school crush and girlfriend of Flash Thompson. Desperate to escape her abusive, alcoholic father to pursue a happier future, she breaks up with Flash after they graduate, becomes a waitress to support her fledgling acting career, and dates Harry Osborn, Peter's best friend who knows of Peter's interest in her, but notes that Peter has never asked her out. She later develops an attraction to Spider-Man after the latter repeatedly rescues her and shares a kiss with him. She also grows closer to Peter, which leads to Harry breaking up with her. When the Goblin deduces Spider-Man's identity, he kidnaps Mary Jane and holds her hostage, but Spider-Man rescues her. Mary Jane later says she loves him and kisses him, but Peter rejects her out of fear that a relationship between them would endanger her. The heartbroken Mary Jane realizes that her kiss with Peter reminded her of the one she shared with Spider-Man.
  - In Spider-Man 2 (2004), Mary Jane, frustrated at Peter's reluctance to be with her and apparent lack of commitment, enters a relationship with John Jameson. Deciding that being without her is too high a cost, Peter resolves to abandon being Spider-Man despite Mary Jane having accepted a marriage proposal from John at the time. However, she comes to realize that she does not truly love John. After Doctor Octopus kidnaps Mary Jane, Spider-Man rescues her, during which he is unmasked in front of her, confirming what she suspected. Refusing to let the potential dangers get in the way of their happiness, Mary Jane breaks up with John and enters a relationship with Peter.
  - In Spider-Man 3 (2007), Peter decides to propose to Mary Jane, but their future is complicated by her professional setbacks, a rivalry for Peter's affections in the form of Gwen Stacy, manipulation by the vengeance-seeking New Goblin, and Peter's behavioral changes brought on by an alien symbiote. After he disposes of said symbiote, it falls into the hands of photographer Eddie Brock, turning him into Venom. He kidnaps Mary Jane, but Spider-Man defeats Venom, destroys the symbiote, and rescues her. In the end, Peter and Mary Jane reconcile.
- In October 2012, Shailene Woodley was confirmed to play Mary Jane Watson in The Amazing Spider-Man 2 (2014), though most of her scenes were cut from the final film, with only a back-of-head cameo appearance in the final scene remaining. Director Marc Webb explained the absence as "a creative decision to streamline the story and focus on Peter [Parker] and Gwen [Stacy] and their relationship". Despite this, Woodley was planned to reprise the role for future installments, starting with The Amazing Spider-Man 3, until Sony's deal with Marvel Studios and Disney resulted in the franchise's cancellation and these plans being unrealized.
- Two incarnations of Mary Jane Watson appear in Spider-Man: Into the Spider-Verse, with one voiced by Zoë Kravitz while the other has no dialogue. In the film's main universe, she was married to Peter Parker prior to his death. Additionally, an alternate reality variant of Mary Jane was previously married to her version of Peter before they divorced due to Peter's fears of having children with her. After encountering the widowed Mary Jane and working with Miles Morales to return to his universe, the alternate Peter becomes inspired to win his former wife back.
  - The second incarnation of Mary Jane Watson appears in Spider-Man: Across the Spider-Verse, voiced by Melissa Sturm. Additionally, Mary Jane / Spinneret and Anna May-Parker / Spiderling from Renew Your Vows make non-speaking appearances as members of the Spider-Society, while the Spider-Gwen incarnation of Mary Jane appears as a member of Gwen Stacy's rock band, voiced by Nicole Delaney. Additionally, Kirsten Dunst's incarnation makes a cameo appearance via a display.
- A character inspired by Mary Jane Watson named Michelle "MJ" Jones-Watson appears in the Marvel Cinematic Universe (MCU) films Spider-Man: Homecoming, Spider-Man: Far From Home, Spider-Man: No Way Home, and Spider-Man: Brand New Day, portrayed by Zendaya. Producer Kevin Feige described the character as "a fun homage" to Spider-Man's past adventures and his past love. According to Spider-Man: Homecoming co-screenwriter John Francis Daley, MJ is intended to be a reinvention of Mary Jane Watson.

=== Video games ===
- Mary Jane Watson appears in The Amazing Spider-Man vs. The Kingpin. She is kidnapped by the titular villain and suspended over an acid tank. If Spider-Man defeats the Kingpin in a timely manner, he is able to save Mary Jane. If not, she will fall to her death, causing Spider-Man to vow revenge as Kingpin is arrested by the police. If Spider-Man loses, both he and Mary Jane die.
- Mary Jane Watson makes a cameo appearance in Marvel Super Heroes via Spider-Man's ending.
- Mary Jane Watson appears in Spider-Man: The Sinister Six, voiced by Laura McPherson.
- Mary Jane Watson makes a cameo appearance in Marvel Super Heroes vs. Street Fighter via Spider-Man's ending.
- Mary Jane Watson appears in Spider-Man (2000), voiced again by Jennifer Hale.
- Mary Jane Watson appears in Spider-Man: Mysterio's Menace.
- Mary Jane Watson, based on Kirsten Dunst's portrayal, appears in the Spider-Man (2002) film tie-in game, voiced by Cat O'Conner.
- Mary Jane Watson appears in the Spider-Man 2 (2004) film tie-in game, voiced by Kirsten Dunst. Similarly to the film, she is unaware of Peter Parker's secret identity until the end. A brief additional storyline sees Peter being tempted to abandon his interest in Mary Jane due to the possibility of a new relationship with the Black Cat, but he eventually abandons this idea after realizing the importance of civilian life.
- The Ultimate Marvel incarnation of Mary Jane Watson appears in Ultimate Spider-Man (2005), voiced by Andrea Baker. This version helps Peter Parker research the villains he fights. In the Nintendo DS version, the player must save an unnamed character with Mary Jane's clothing and hair color.
- Mary Jane Watson appears in Spider-Man: Battle for New York.
- Mary Jane Watson, based on Kirsten Dunst's portrayal, appears in the Spider-Man 3 film tie-in game, voiced by Kari Wahlgren.
- Mary Jane Watson appears in Spider-Man: Web of Shadows, voiced by Dana Seltzer. In the two "Red Suit" endings, she either joins Spider-Man in web-slinging across New York or fails to answer his phone call, during which he apologizes for his actions and begs for her forgiveness. In one of two "Black Suit" endings, she abandons him entirely for using the aforementioned suit.
- Mary Jane Watson appears in Spider-Man: Edge of Time, voiced by Laura Vandervoort.
- Mary Jane Watson appears in Lego Marvel Super Heroes, voiced again by Tara Strong. Mary Jane also appears as a NPC in Lego Marvel Super Heroes 2 during the "Avenger's World Tour" level, she can also be found in the game's character creator.
- Mary Jane Watson makes a cameo appearance in Lego Marvel's Avengers.
- Mary Jane Watson appears in Spider-Man Unlimited (2014), voiced again by Tara Strong. She initially appears as a non-playable character before several playable versions were added in later updates.
- Mary Jane Watson / Iron Spider appears in Marvel Avengers Academy.
- Mary Jane Watson appears as a playable character in Spider-Man (2018), voiced by Laura Bailey. Similarly to her Ultimate Marvel counterpart, this version is an investigative reporter for the Daily Bugle. Additionally, she and Peter Parker were in a relationship months before the game's plot, with MJ being aware of his dual life as Spider-Man, before her frustrations with his over-protectiveness led to them breaking up. After her reporting duties cause her and Peter to cross paths in the present, she offers to work with him as a full partner to investigate the power vacuum left behind by Wilson Fisk's arrest. In the process, she and Peter struggle with defining their relationship romantically and as a crime-fighting duo while their work brings them closer together before they eventually reconcile. Three months after the story's conclusion, she and Peter rekindle their relationship. In The City That Never Sleeps DLC, she assists Peter in stopping Hammerhead and the Maggia before leaving for Symkaria to report on and raise awareness for the civil war taking place there.
- Mary Jane Watson appears as a playable character and boss in Spider-Man 2 (2023), voiced again by Laura Bailey. As of this game, she has undergone combat training with Silver Sable and taken to wielding a stun gun. Additionally, she attempts to earn J. Jonah Jameson's trust after he bought back the Daily Bugle to avoid losing her job. While helping Peter and their friend Harry Osborn with the latter's symbiote, Harry transforms into Venom and infects her with another symbiote, transforming her into Scream. Using her repressed frustrations with Peter and her job, Scream forces Mary Jane to fight him until he reconciles with her, allowing her to resist Scream's control and remove her. Mary Jane subsequently quits the Bugle and, after helping Peter and Miles Morales defeat Venom, starts a podcast called "The New Normal" and moves into May Parker's house with Peter.
- Mary Jane Watson appears in Marvel Tokon: Fighting Souls, appearing in the background of the New York night stage alongside She-Hulk.

=== Novels ===
Romance novelist Judith O'Brien wrote two young adult novels featuring a teenage Mary Jane in 2003 and 2004, with illustrations by Mike Mayhew. This version is a shy, insecure girl who knew Peter Parker from elementary school and deals with anorexia and peer pressure.

- The first novel is a retelling of Spider-Man's origin story from Mary Jane's point of view. After learning Norman Osborn had injected a super drug called OZ into the spider that bit Peter Parker and into sports drinks sold to their classmates, Mary Jane joins Peter in exposing Norman. The novel was successful with teenage girls who were unfamiliar with the comics, but was met with criticism from core fans due to its characterization and changing continuity.
- The second novel, Mary Jane 2, relates Peter and Mary Jane's continuing relationship and the emergence of Gwen Stacy, who develops feelings for Peter after Mary Jane gives her a makeover.

== Collected editions ==
=== Spider-Man/Red Sonja ===
Title	Material collected	Published date	ISBN
Spider-Man/Red Sonja: Sword of the She-Devil	Marvel Team-Up #79 and Spider-Man/Red Sonja #1–5	March 2008	978-0-7851-3210-3

=== The Amazing Mary Jane ===
Title	Material collected	Published date	ISBN
The Amazing Mary Jane: Down in Flames, Up in Smoke	Amazing Mary Jane #1–6	April 2020	978-1-3029-2027-2

=== Mary Jane & Black Cat / Jackpot & Black Cat ===
Title	Material collected	Published date	ISBN
Amazing Spider-Man: Beyond Vol. 3	Mary Jane & Black Cat: Beyond #1 and Amazing Spider-Man (vol. 5) #86–88, 88.BEY	January 2022	978-1-3029-3258-9
Mary Jane & Black Cat: Dark Web	Mary Jane & Black Cat #1–5	July 2023	978-1-3029-4799-6
Jackpot & Black Cat	Jackpot #1 and Jackpot & Black Cat #1–4	November 2024	978-1-3029-5754-4

=== Spider-Man Loves Mary Jane ===
Title	Material collected	Published date	ISBN
Mary Jane Volume 1: Circle of Friends	Mary Jane #1–4	November 2004	978-0-7851-1467-3
Mary Jane Volume 2: Homecoming	Mary Jane: Homecoming #1–4	October 2005	978-0-7851-1779-7
Spider-Man Loves Mary Jane Vol. 1: Super Crush	Spider-Man Loves Mary Jane #1–5	July 2006	978-0-7851-1954-8
Spider-Man Loves Mary Jane Vol. 2: The New Girl	Spider-Man Loves Mary Jane #6–10	January 2007	978-0-7851-2265-4
Spider-Man Loves Mary Jane Vol. 3: My Secret Life	Spider-Man Loves Mary Jane #11–15	June 2007	978-0-7851-2266-1
Spider-Man Loves Mary Jane Vol. 4: Still Friends	Spider-Man Loves Mary Jane #16–20	October 2007	978-0-7851-2564-8
Spider-Man Loves Mary Jane: Sophomore Jinx	Spider-Man Loves Mary Jane (vol. 2) #1–5	July 2009	978-0-7851-3005-5
Spider-Man Loves Mary Jane: The Real Thing	Mary Jane #1–4, Mary Jane: Homecoming #1–4, Spider-Man Loves Mary Jane #1–3	June 2019	978-1-3029-1873-6
Spider-Man Loves Mary Jane: The Unexpected Thing	Spider-Man Loves Mary Jane #4–13	October 2019	978-1-3029-1978-8
Spider-Man Loves Mary Jane: The Secret Thing	Spider-Man Loves Mary Jane #14–20, Spider-Man Loves Mary Jane (vol. 2) #1–5	October 2020	978-1-3029-2537-6

=== All-New Venom / Venom ===
Title	Material collected	Published date	ISBN
Venom by Al Ewing and Carlos Gómez: Who Is All-New Venom?	All-New Venom #1–5	August 12, 2025	978-1-3029-6197-8
Venom by Al Ewing and Carlos Gómez: Confession	All-New Venom #6–10 and Venom #250	February 11, 2026	979-1-0391-4266-3
Venom by Al Ewing and Carlos Gómez: All-New Venom	All-New Venom #1–10	January 6, 2026	978-1-3029-6819-9
Venom by Al Ewing and Carlos Gómez: Behind the Masque	Venom #250–254	November 17, 2026	978-1-3029-6722-2
