= The Amazing Mary Jane =

Comic book series

The Amazing Mary Jane: Down in Flames, Up in Smoke
- Cover to The Amazing Mary Jane: Down in Flames, Up in Smoke (April 2020). Art by Carlos Gomez

Publication information
- Publisher: Marvel Comics
- Format: Limited series
- Genre: Superhero
- Publication date: October 2019 – March 2020
- No. of issues: 6
- Main character: Mary Jane Watson

Creative team
- Written by: Leah Williams
- Artist: Carlos Gomez
- Letterer: Joe Caramagna
- Colorist: Carlos Lopez
- Editor: Kathleen Wisneski

The Amazing Mary Jane: Down in Flames, Up in Smoke, published initially as The Amazing Mary Jane, is a 2019 comic book by Marvel Comics, starring Mary Jane Watson. It is written by Leah Williams with art by Carlos Gomez.

== Editorial history ==
The comic book was first announced at San Diego Comic-Con, with the writer Leah Williams and artist Carlos Gomez. The announcement included several promotional variant covers of Mary Jane alongside other superheroes. The plot of the comic book is a spin-off of plots from The Amazing Spider-Man published at the time.

While it was never officially cancelled by Marvel, the series is widely considered to have been cancelled due to the COVID-19 pandemic. This was corroborated by cover artist Paolo Siqueira, who also said that the series was supposed to last for at least ten issues.

After concluding a story arc in the first five issues, the sixth issue seemed to be setting up a new arc before this cancellation, leading to it being compiled simply as The Amazing Mary Jane: Down in Flames, Up in Smoke.

== Plot ==
Mary Jane Watson moves to Hollywood to make a film about the supervillain Mysterio. The director, unaware of Mary Jane's relation with Spider-Man, confides with her that he's actually Quentin Beck, the original Mysterio, using his illusion powers to conceal his identity. Mary Jane trusts him and proceeds with the film, despite the attempts of the Savage Six to sabotage it.

== Reception ==
Jesse Schedeen at IGN points that the release of a Mary Jane comic book may be justified by her roles in the film Spider-Man: Far From Home, the Spider-Man video game and the ongoing Spider-Man series by Nick Spencer, but doubted that the comic had much content in itself. He considered that the scenes about the woes of Hollywood film-making and the prominence of Mysterio came at the expense of Mary Jane, who looks like a secondary character in her own comic book. He also considers that the art may be appropriate for the superhero genre, and in fact looks similar to the Spider-Man comics of early 2000s, but it felt out of place in a comic book without actual superhero conflicts.

== Collected editions ==
Title	Material collected	Release date	ISBN
The Amazing Mary Jane: Down in Flames, Up in Smoke	The Amazing Mary Jane #1–5	April 22, 2020	978-1-302-92027-2

== See also ==
- List of current Marvel Comics publications
