= Hypno-Hustler =

Publication information
- Publisher: Marvel Comics
- First appearance: Peter Parker, the Spectacular Spider-Man #24 (November 1978)
- Created by: Bill Mantlo; Frank Springer

In-story information
- Alter ego: Antoine Delsoin
- Species: Human
- Team affiliations: The Mercy Killers; Vil-Anon
- Abilities: Hypnosis via specialized goggles Boots grant: Knockout gas projection Retractable knives in the soles

The Hypno-Hustler (Antoine Delsoin) is a supervillain appearing in American comic books published by Marvel Comics. Debuting in Peter Parker, the Spectacular Spider-Man #24 (November 1978), created by Bill Mantlo and Frank Springer, the Hypno-Hustler is a recurring enemy of Spider-Man with the ability to perform hypnosis using technology.

Hypno-Hustler has received negative reception, often noted as a ridiculous character.

== Publication history ==
Hypno-Hustler's debut in Peter Parker, the Spectacular Spider-Man #24, art by Frank Springer

Hypno-Hustler first appeared in Peter Parker, the Spectacular Spider-Man #24 (November 1978), created by Bill Mantlo and Frank Springer.

== Fictional character biography ==
Antoine Desloin is the lead singer of the Mercy Killers, going by the name of Hypno-Hustler. He and his band are scheduled to perform at a nightclub called "Beyond Forever." When the club's manager catches Hypno-Hustler robbing his safe, he used his hypnotic equipment on the manager. When it comes time to perform, Hypno-Hustler and his band use their hypnotizing equipment on the audience in a plan to rob them as well. Peter Parker is at the club at the time and changed into Spider-Man. During the fight, Spider-Man discovers that Hypno-Hustler's headphones protect him from the Mercy Killers' singing. Spider-Man manages to remove the headphones from Hypno-Hustler, causing him to become a victim of his own hypnosis. When the audience is free of the hypnosis, Hypno-Hustler and his Mercy Killers are webbed up and left for the police.

Hypno-Hustler later appears at a Vil-Anon meeting with Armadillo, Big Wheel, Equinox, Man-Bull, and Schizoid Man.

While Tombstone is in prison and in need of a heart bypass, Hypno-Hustler is among the inmates who he hires to protect him.

During the "Origin of the Species" storyline, Hypno-Hustler comes into a police station wanting help, as Spider-Man is on a rampage against various villains following the kidnapping of Menace's child.

After Tinkerer repairs his costume, Hypno-Hustler tries to escape from prison, only to be defeated by Deadpool and Spider-Man.

During the "Hunted" storyline, Hypno-Hustler appears as a patron at the Pop-Up with No Name.

== Powers and abilities ==
The Hypno-Hustler can perform hypnosis with the aid of his goggles, and when teamed with his backup band, The Mercy Killers, can perform mass hypnosis. His boots can emit knockout gas on demand, and have retractable knives in the soles.

== Other versions ==
=== House of M ===
An alternate universe version of Hypno-Hustler makes a minor appearance in House of M.

=== Spider-Man: Reign ===
An alternate universe version of Hypno-Hustler appears in Spider-Man: Reign. This version is an aged supervillain who has come to sympathize with Spider-Man. Realizing that Spider-Man is coming out of retirement and the Reign will be challenged, Hypno-Hustler attempts to incite a rebellion, only to be killed by Reign officers.

== In other media ==
- A solo Hypno-Hustler film set in Sony's Spider-Man Universe (SSU) was in development by Sony Pictures with Donald Glover set to star and produce. Following the financial failures of Madame Web and Kraven the Hunter and the underperformance of Venom: The Last Dance, it was announced that Sony would cease making SSU films, most likely including this film.
- Hypno-Hustler makes a non-speaking cameo appearance in The Avengers: Earth's Mightiest Heroes episode "Some Assembly Required".
- Hypno-Hustler appears as an assist character in the PlayStation 2 and PlayStation Portable versions of Spider-Man: Web of Shadows.
- In late 2025, Hypno-Hustler received a Marvel Legends figure in Series 13 of Hasbro's themed Spider-Man line.

== Reception ==
Hypno-Hustler has received negative reception, sometimes being ranked as one of the worst supervillains in comic books due to his outdated 1970s camp factor. ShortList ranked the Hypno-Hustler as the second worst supervillain of all time. Meanwhile, heavy.com listed him as one of the 20 worst supervillains. CraveOnline put the Hypno-Hustler at number 3 of their "five Spider-Man villains you will never see in theaters" list, describing him as "a recurring joke in the Marvel Universe for decades". Tony Wilson of Dorkly referenced him as one of Spider-Man's "Dumbest Forgotten Villains" in his "Today in Nerd History" sketch comedy video.

In 2022, CBR.com ranked Hypno-Hustler 7th in their "Spider-Man's 10 Funniest Villains" list.

Hypno-Hustler has been noted as an underwhelming villain.
