= Spider-Man: Reign =

2006–07 comic book series by Kaare Andrews

- Cover for Spider-Man: Reign collection. Art by Kaare Andrews.

Publication information
- Publisher: Marvel Comics
- Schedule: Monthly
- Format: Limited series
- Genre: Superhero
- Publication date: December 2006 – March 2007
- No. of issues: 4
- Main character: Spider-Man

Creative team
- Written by: Kaare Andrews
- Artist(s): Kaare Andrews; Jose Villarrubia (4)
- Letterer(s): Chris Eliopoulos; Rus Wooton (4)
- Colorist: Kaare Andrews
- Editor(s): Axel Alonso; Michael O'Connor (4); Joe Quesada (4)

Collected editions
- Hardcover: ISBN 0-7851-1717-2
- Paperback: ISBN 0-7851-2665-1

Spider-Man: Reign is a four-issue comic book limited series featuring Spider-Man, written and illustrated by Kaare Andrews and published by Marvel Comics. Set 30 years into Spider-Man's future, on Earth-70237, it features a retired Spider-Man who returns to combat the injustices of a vastly different New York City.

== Publication history ==
On December 12, 2006, Marvel announced that issue #1 had sold out through Diamond Comic Distributors and that a second printing would be released.

The series has been compared to The Dark Knight Returns, a comparison which Marvel has also quoted when promoting Reign. As well as the thematic similarities between the two stories, both of which revisit aged heroes after the end of their careers, The Dark Knight Returns is also acknowledged within the pages of Reign by the inclusion of a character named Miller Janson (the name reflects Dark Knight Returns creators Frank Miller and Klaus Janson).

The book also has several themes relevant in the post 9/11 world, most notably Mayor Waters taking control of the city of New York to protect it, and the WEBB, an energy field that seals all of New York inside it so no one can leave.

In August 2023, Marvel announced a sequel to Reign with Andrews returning to write and draw the series. The first issue of Spider-Man: Reign 2 was released on July 3, 2024.

== Plot ==
Thirty years into Spider-Man's future, New York City has become a safe, albeit authoritarian territory under the complete control of Mayor Waters and his advisor, Edward Saks. Both superheroes and supervillains are outlawed as "Super-Terrorists", while security is enforced by the authoritarian city police force, "The Reign".

One of three kids fleeing from Reign agents after spray painting is caught while an elderly Peter Parker works as a florist, but he is fired for ruining a couple's wedding by sending the wrong flowers. On his way home the other kid crashes into him, Reign agents accidentally injure Peter in their arrest of the youth. The last kid, a very young girl, escapes.

Parker returns home and is haunted by memories and hallucinations of his deceased wife Mary Jane Watson, who acts as a moral guide for his actions in the present day. Meanwhile, Mayor Waters announces the WEBB system that will operate from the Mayor's tower, that will protect the city by emitting an energy barrier that will prevent anyone from entering or exiting the city without permission. Behind the scenes, he keeps a vegetative Kingpin prisoner, mocking him.

That night at Peter's apartment, he is awoken by knocking, he answers it in his underwear to see J. Jonah Jameson there to talk and give him a package. Jameson apologizes for his years of abuse, explaining he sold the Daily Bugle when he realized he was running it on lies, the biggest being about Spider-Man's character. Peter does not respond and shuts the door. Jameson leaves and starts vandalising, which leads him fighting two Reign officers. Meanwhile, Parker opens the package revealing a camera and his old black-suit mask. He defeats the officers wearing only the mask in underwear, imagining himself in his prime. Jameson asks if Spider-Man is back, Peter punches him and walks away.

The next day, Peter regrets what he did and pleads with his hallucination of MJ to pack so they can flee before WEBB is activated and is pleading while she stares out the window not responding. Jameson announces Spider-Man's return in the streets with young followers, while the Reign-backed Daily Bugle News network reports him as crazed. Mayor Waters is dismayed at the return of Spider-Man and Saks calms him by releasing Electro, Mysterio, Kraven the Hunter, the Sandman, the Scorpion and Hydro-Man from prison, while also advancing WEBB to activate tonight. The Saks then tells the mayor that the newly christened "Sinister Six" understand that if they defeat their old foe, they will be released from prison and New York, and WEBB will prevent them from ever returning. Water's doubts their loyalty but Saks says that they have remote explosives implanted inside them in case they betray Reign.

The graffiti girl is led by a kid named Kasey to a dilapidated church where a large group of kids are listening to Jameson. At his behest, Kasey hacks all electronics in the city to display Jameson's speech and Spider-Man's home address. A crowd gathers outside Peter's apartment including the girl, Jameson, his followers and Reign Agents ordering all to disperse. An elderly Hypno-Hustler is there too and comes out of retirement wishing to aid his former foe. However, the boombox he uses to force Reign to dance soon runs out of battery power due to its age, allowing the Reign to kill him.

MJ continues to look out the window despite Peter's pleas leading him to see outside. Reign agents see him and shoot a missile at his apartment as MJ suddenly smiles. Peter's apartment is destroyed but after the smoke clears, Spider-Man leaps out cheerfully, wearing his full black costume and using his old tactics of taunting his foes. A Reign agent tries to arrest Jameson but is attacked by the crowd of youth and adults. The girl believes they are inspired by seeing Spider-Man fight. However, the rioters morale crumbles seeing Kraven impaling Kasey on his large knife with the rest of the Sinner Six behind him.

Spider-Man is cornered by the Sinner Six but does not fight back. Kraven rips his mask off, further disheartening the crowd when they realize their hero is an old, defeated man. He is saved at the last moment by a deceased Doctor Octopus, whose final command to his still active tentacles cause them to bring Peter to three grave-markers: those of Mary Jane, Aunt May, and Uncle Ben forcing him to confront his despair.

In the Mayor's tower, a detained Jameson attacks him and Saks only for Saks to reveal himself as Venom. Venom activates WEBB system to project his suit, converting the New Yorkers into symbiotes that obey him while WEBB prevents anyone from escaping the city. He says that he is doing this so he will never be alone again like he was after Eddie Brock's death. He tells the Sinner Six to guard the tower before Spider-Man begins his assault, Sandman is on the ground floor commanding Reign Agents.

Ock's tentacles dig out Mary Jane's body from her coffin and put Peter's arms forcing him face-to-face with his fear that MJ had told him to "go" in disgust in her last moments when he wanted to go stop a robbery, but instead learns that she meant "go get em tiger." Ock's tentacles bury themselves, Ock's body, and MJ in a new grave while Peter enters MJ's old coffin to retrieve his famous red-and-blue suit, which he had secretly buried with her.

The girl is chased by a large symbiote and runs back to the ruined church where the kids returned to after the riot. The symbiote catches up and absorbs the kids there and the girl hits the church bell out of desperation and keeps hitting it when seeing the sound hurting it. She rallies the kids to use this knowledge, their youth and will to drive the symbiotes back to the Tower. A kid says that their families will be hunted if they do and the girl says that that is why they will wear masks as she makes Kasey's beanie into a balaclava.

As Spider-Man rises up the tower, he kills or incapacitates the Sinner Six except for Sandman, who is still at the ground floor. There, the girl and the rest of kids from the church arrive, having managed to force some of the symbiotes back to the tower and Sandman shouts at them to return home. Waters calls in and orders them to shoot. The girl gives a speech that anger, courage and truth are related and reveals her power to turn to solid cement. The Reign guards are alarmed by it and start shooting (causing the rest of the kids to run) despite Sandman ordering them to not shoot as he realised that she is his daughter while she holds her ground. Her limbs are broken off into chunks by the shooting and only after Sandman attacks them. He tries to console her and tell her how to regenerate but he is interrupted by symbiotes. After he drives them off he sees that she returned to human form and died.

Spider-Man confronts Venom atop the top floor of the tower where before they fight, Venom says that he blames him for bringing them to a hostile foreign planet and then leaving them to die. The fight leads out the building and to the peak of ther tower where the WEBB system is kept in place with Spider-Man losing and Venom drawing all the symbiotes to the tower to assist him. The Sandman arrives at the last minute and presumably kills the fleeing Mayor and comes to the tower's peak to give Spider-Man the detonator to his and his team's explosives. Spider-Man activates the detonator, causing the Six, whose bodies were left all across the tower's many floors, to explode, also killing Venom and the symbiotes in the process.

After Venom and the Reign are defeated, Jameson reports that all crime levels are back to where they were years ago, but so are the superheroes. As Peter visits Mary Jane's grave, he states that he will join her in peace one day, until which he has responsibilities to attend to.

== Characters ==
- Peter Parker/Spider-Man: Now a lonely senior citizen, Peter Parker lives alone in a small apartment and suffers hallucinations of Mary Jane. With the reappearance of J. Jonah Jameson, he faces his past life as Spider-Man and gradually faces his isolation and fears to re-accept his responsibility to those he has sworn to protect. An alternative version of this character was later killed by Daemos in Spider-Verse using his wife's tombstone as a weapon. Due to his lack of a costume and chronology, this was revealed to be an alternate version of the character.
- Mayor Waters: New York's current mayor. Waters backs a "laser-powered protective barrier", the WEBB, which will supposedly protect the city from any "super-terrorist attack". He has also suspended the normal electoral processes, remaining in office without an election and justifying this as a security issue. His office is known as the Reign.
- J. Jonah Jameson: A seemingly senile old man, often compared to Citizen Kane, he returns "from the mountain" to spread a message of impending disaster. He comes to suspect the Mayor is colluding with the Venom symbiote and laces his rants with metaphorical allusions to the threat. He raises a small army of children to help him in bringing Spider-Man out of retirement to save the city again.
- Mary Jane Watson-Parker: The long-dead wife of Peter Parker. Though dead, she appears as a recurring hallucination to Peter. It is revealed that she died of cancer brought on by exposure to Peter's radioactive semen during intercourse over the years.
- The Sinner Six: A version of the Sinister Six, composed of supervillains now in their senior years. Dubbed the "Sinner Six", this version of the team is forced into the employ of New York's fascist mayor, Mayor Waters. If the team manages to kill Spider-Man, they will gain their freedom from New York, which is sealed within the WEBB security system. The team consists of the Scorpion, Electro, Mysterio, Kraven the Hunter, Hydro-Man, and the Sandman. Spider-Man faces each as he attempts to reach the top of Olympus Tower.
- The Hypno-Hustler: An aged supervillain, now sympathizing with Spider-Man. Realizing that Spider-Man is coming out of retirement and the Reign will be challenged, he attempts to help by using his old hypno-music to distract Reign officers and encourage citizens to revolt. Unfortunately, his boombox loses power and the officers swiftly retaliate with deadly force, killing him immediately.
- Otto Octavius: Doctor Octopus has died years prior to the start of the story. The four arms remain connected to the skeletal remains of Otto Octavius. Still powered, they act on artificial intelligence to carry out his final wish – to find Peter Parker and return him to his costume in an effort to encourage him to retake the mantle of Spider-Man.
- Edward Saks/Venom (Eddie Brock): Waters' assistant, Venom is the mastermind behind the WEBB system, allowing him to summon a symbiotic army. He replicated his symbiote a hundred times and strives to have his final revenge on Spider-Man for abandoning him years ago. He mentions a person named Eddie, mostly likely Eddie Brock. It is unknown whether he and Brock are one and the same.
- The Kingpin: Kept alive via an IV drip, the former Kingpin of Crime is reduced to being a prisoner visited every year by Waters upon the anniversary of the latter's takeover of the city.
- Susie Baker: A pre-teen girl who is William Baker's daughter. She is fashioned as a tomboy in slacks and a jacket over a striped shirt. She is a recurring character and is witness to several events in the story, which builds her courage to lead a group of children in revolt against the symbiote attack. She reveals herself to be the daughter of the Sandman, with the ability to turn herself into cement, and dies in defiance of Reign officers.

== Reception ==
Spider-Man: Reign has been received moderately positive by critics. In 2011, Complex ranked Spider-Man: Reign 17 on a list of the 25 top Spider-Man stories of all time, adding that while it might not be the best original Spider-Man story ever (having been inspired by Frank Miller's The Dark Knight Returns), it is still one of the best, due to being simultaneously heartbreaking and uplifting. Chad Nevett mixedly reviewed the series for CBR.com and noted the series' subject matter to have been inspired by both the plot of The Dark Knight Returns and the lighter, more comedic tone of its sequel The Dark Knight Strikes Again, praising Venom's use in the story, Peter Parker's complexity and maturity and Kaare Andrews' Miller-inspired art style, stating that Spider-Man: Reign may be a horribly-flawed work, but compelling in its own way. io9 ranked the series' version of an older and widowed Peter Parker on a list of the greatest Spider-Men of all time in 2017, citing that Andrews' story is the most perfect example of how miserable Parker's life is in most Spider-Man interpretations.

However, the response to the series has not been completely positive. In a more negative review, Thomas Andrew from liveaboutdotcom ranked Spider-Man: Reign fourth on a list of the five most controversial Spider-Man stories, criticizing it for its lack of originality, fierceness and invention. Another criticized aspect was the revelation that Mary Jane's untimely death was due to her exposure to Peter's radioactivity every time that they had sexual intercourse without protection, citing it as slightly inappropriate for a superhero comic book. When the series was released, Wired criticized Mary Jane's odd death, accusing Marvel Comics of "having finally gone porno".

=== Nudity controversy ===
In issue #1, there is a panel known as the "Nude Panel". As the elderly Peter Parker sits on the edge of his bed (hands on his face), his genitals were exposed for the first time in the character's history. The issue was soon recalled and removed from the second run of Spider-Man: Reign #1 for fear of "corrupting minors".

== In other media ==
A female version of Mayor Waters appears in The Spectacular Spider-Man, voiced by B.J. Ward.

== Collected editions ==
Title	Years covered	Material collected	Format	Pages	Released	ISBN
Spider-Man: Reign	2007	Spider-Man: Reign #1–4	HC	160	18 Apr 2007	978-0785117179
Spider-Man: Reign	2007	Spider-Man: Reign #1–4	TPB	160	2 Apr 2008	978-0785126652
Spider-Man: Reign	2007	Spider-Man: Reign #1–4	TPB	160	4 Jun 2024	978-1302958152
