= Dark Web (Marvel Comics) =

Comic book storyline

- The standard cover art for Dark Web #1. Art by Adam Kubert.
- Publisher: Marvel Comics
- Publication date: November 2022 – February 2023
- Main character(s): Spider-Man; X-Men; Chasm; Madelyne Pryor; Mary Jane Watson; Black Cat; Eddie Brock; Venom; Gold Goblin; Ms. Marvel (Kamala Khan); Hallows' Eve

Creative team
- Writers: Zeb Wells; Christopher Cantwell; Sabir Pirzada; Gerry Duggan; Jed MacKay; Al Ewing; Ram V
- Pencillers: Adam Kubert; Ed McGuinness; Lan Medina; Francesco Mortarino; Rod Reis; Vincenzo Carratù; Bryan Hitch

"Dark Web" is an American comic book crossover storyline written by Zeb Wells with art by Adam Kubert and Ed McGuinness, published in 2022 by Marvel Comics. The story, which serves as a spiritual successor to "Inferno", involves Spider-Man and the X-Men joining forces against Ben Reilly and Madelyne Pryor as the two wronged clones are teaming up as Chasm and Goblin Queen to raise hell across the Marvel Universe.

"Dark Web" is bookended by two one-shots, subtitled Dusk and Dawn, and the story continued in the pages of Zeb Wells' run of Amazing Spider-Man. The storyline tied into various other books like Venom (vol. 5) and limited series including Gold Goblin, Mary Jane & Black Cat, Dark Web: Ms. Marvel, and Dark Web: X-Men.

Amazing Spider-Man (vol. 6) #18, Dark Web Finale, Dark Web: Ms. Marvel #2, Dark Web: X-Men #3, Mary Jane & Black Cat #2, and Venom (vol. 5) #15 were dedicated in memory of Carlos Pacheco.

== Publication history ==
In April 2022, Marvel comics posted a teaser "The Dark Web is being spun" that will involve Spider-Man prior to the release of the Free Comic Book Day: Spider-Man/Venom #1. The comic book issue ended with a teaser revealing Ben Reilly is working with Madelyne Pryor. At San Diego Comic-Con in July 2022, teaser art from Ryan Stegman offered a glimpse on the event with the Goblin Queen looming over Spider-Man, Venom, Black Cat, Cyclops, Jean Grey, Magik, Iceman, Firestar, Mary Jane Watson, Chasm and Hallows' Eve, a new member of Spider-Man's rogue's gallery. It is revealed in the Next Big Thing panel to be a Spider-Man/X-Men crossover spearheaded by current Amazing Spider-Man writer Zeb Wells. The two franchises recently crossed paths when the X-Men's former ally Moira MacTaggert kidnapped Watson and used her as a puppet to infiltrate the Hellfire Gala.

Prelude issues were published in November to set up the event letting readers see exactly what Chasm and the Goblin Queen have been busy with. Venom (vol. 5) #13 set the stage to the crossover as Eddie Brock returns from space and finds an unexpected ally in Madelyne Pryor. Amazing Spider-Man (vol. 6) #14 introduced Chasm, Reilly's new persona, and a brand new villain, Hallows' Eve, who was pivotal to the event.

Limited series Gold Goblin, Mary Jane & Black Cat, Dark Web: Ms. Marvel and Dark Web: X-Men tied directly to the Dark Web saga. Gold Goblin, written by Christopher Cantwell with art from Lan Medina, set up a new status quo for Norman Osborn whose sins were cleansed during the Last Remains storyline. Mary Jane & Black Cat, written by Jed MacKay with art from Vincenzo Carratù, forces two of the greatest loves of Peter Parker's life for another team up after being thrown into each other's path; Mary Jane Watson and Black Cat previously joined forces during the Beyond storyline. Dark Web: Ms. Marvel, written by Sabir Pirzada with art from Francesco Mortarino, took Ms. Marvel in Limbo against deadly experiments going haywire; Kamala Khan recently started her internship with Oscorp in Amazing Spider-Man. In Dark Web: X-Men, written by Gerry Duggan with art from Rod Reis, the new X-Men team defended New York City from Limbo.

== Plot ==
Ben Reilly (Chasm) and Goblin Queen walk through Limbo as she reveals that she has Venom working for her in exchange for helping him find Dylan Brock. Goblin Queen mentions to Chasm that she planned to target the Krakoan base in New York, but cannot attack the X-Men because of her peace agreement with Krakoa. Meanwhile, Cyclops, Jean Grey, Havok, Magik, Iceman, and Firestar are shopping when they see demonic visions. Spider-Man's spider senses go off as demons begin attacking New York. At Oscorp, Norman Osborn is confronted by Chasm, who claims that Peter took his memories. As Osborn starts to initiate the Golden Glider voice key, Chasm attacks him and destroys the Golden Glider.

Chasm confronts Spider-Man, who recognizes him as Ben Reilly and tries to reason with him. When Ms. Marvel arrives, Chasm casts a spell to trap her in Limbo. As Spider-Man continues his fight against Venom, J. Jonah Jameson tells his fellow staff members that Christmas is canceled and that they need to make their story. As Jameson goes to his office, he finds Chasm in it as he claims that "New York's not the only thing going to Hell". Threatening to set the demonic Christmas trees on fire, Spider-Man weakens the Venom symbiote and punches Eddie Brock. With Venom defeated and the remaining trees fleeing, Spider-Man is confronted by Goblin Queen and Hallows' Eve.

At the X-Men's tree house, Goblin Queen and Hallows' Eve arrive with Venom, who is punched off the building to serve as a diversion. Spider-Man and Chasm are still fighting as Spider-Man knocks a sphere out of his hand. After knocking Spider-Man down, Chasm picks up the sphere and starts reciting a spell. Chasm reveals that he sent J. Jonah Jameson and Robbie Robertson to Limbo. Noticing that Chasm is tormenting the people he knows there, Spider-Man tells Chasm to take him to Limbo. Chasm summons a tentacled demon, who drags Spider-Man to Limbo.

In Limbo, Peter punches a shark-like demon who tried to bite the head off of another demon. Peter then gets to work as the demon calls him Parker Pete-Man. Meanwhile, in an abandoned building, a demon is held captive and turned into Limbo's version of Scorpion called Gorepion. At Jameson's demonic apartment, Parker visits Jameson stating that he might have a way to get them out of Limbo. On the streets, the demon operating as Parker-Man runs into his larger brother who has a plan that can help him. The next day, Jameson and Robbie Robertson inform the staff that some demons have been allowed to leave for New York City and sends them to investigate.

After the X-Men call a truce with her, Goblin Queen begins to clean up her home before she can help clean up New York of the demonic invasion. She starts by speaking to Chasm to end his torture on Spider-Man. As Chasm swings off, Hallows' Eve claims to Goblin Queen that they can take care of themselves. Meanwhile, Spider-Man meets Rek-Rap, who helps Spider-Man fight the Insidious Six. Goblin Queen instructs Hallows' Eve to see that her forces withdraw from New York. Instead, Hallows' Eve throws Goblin Queen off the castle, and claims her scythe. As Chasm goes to Limbo's fruit tree, he is confronted by Hallows' Eve wielding Goblin Queen's scythe. Chasm is given the scythe and transforms into King Chasm.

On the streets of Limbo Annex, Chasm and Hallows' Eve walk the streets with the Insidious Six and other demons until the X-Men attack. Chasm orders the Insidious Six to attack the X-Men. Goblin Queen confronts Chasm and Hallows' Eve while killing the demons with them. As Chasm gives the order to focus their forces on Goblin Queen, he and Hallows' Eve are confronted by Spider-Man and Rek-Rap. As demons swarm over Goblin Queen, she unleashes her full power as the demons stop attacking her. Chasm finds that Goblin Queen has turned the demons against him. As Hallows' Eve states that she will not leave Chasm's side, she is teleported away. Cyclops calls for a transport team to take Chasm into custody.

== Issues involved ==
=== Prelude issues ===
| Title | Issues | Writer | Artist | Colorist | Debut date | Conclusion date |
|---|---|---|---|---|---|---|
| Amazing Spider-Man (vol. 5) | #93 | Zeb Wells | Patrick Gleason, Sara Pichelli, & Mark Bagley | Bryan Valenza & Carlos Lopez | March 30, 2022 | |
| New Mutants | #28 | Vita Ayala | Rod Reis & Jan Duursema | Rod Reis & Ruth Redmond | October 17, 2022 | |
| Venom (vol. 5) | #13 | Al Ewing | Bryan Hitch | Alex Sinclair | November 2, 2022 | |
| Amazing Spider-Man (vol. 6) | #14 | Zeb Wells | Michael Dowling, Kyle Holtz, Terry Dodson, Ryan Stegman | Richard Isanove, Dan Brown, Terry Dodson, & Matt Hollingsworth | November 23, 2022 | |

=== Main series ===
| Title | Issues | Writer | Artist | Colorist | Debut date | Conclusion date |
|---|---|---|---|---|---|---|
| Dark Web (Dusk) | #1 | Zeb Wells | Adam Kubert | Frank Martin | December 7, 2022 | |
| Amazing Spider-Man (vol. 6) | #15–18 | Zeb Wells | Ed McGuinness | Marcio Menyz | December 14, 2022 | January 25, 2023 |
| Dark Web Finale (Dawn) | #1 | Zeb Wells | Adam Kubert | Frank Martin | February 1, 2023 | |

=== Tie-in issues ===
| Title | Issues | Writer | Artist | Colorist | Debut date | Conclusion date |
|---|---|---|---|---|---|---|
| Gold Goblin | #2–3 | Christopher Cantwell | Lan Medina | Antonio Fabela | December 21, 2022 | January 4, 2023 |
| Dark Web: Ms. Marvel | #1–2 | Sabir Pirzada | Francesco Mortarino | Dono Sanchez Almara | December 21, 2022 | January 11, 2023 |
| Dark Web: X-Men | #1–3 | Gerry Duggan | Rod Reis | | December 14, 2022 | January 18, 2023 |
| Mary Jane & Black Cat | #1–2 | Jed MacKay | Vincenzo Carratù | Brian Reber | December 21, 2022 | January 11, 2023 |
| Venom (vol. 5) | #14–16 | Al Ewing, Ram V | Bryan Hitch | Alex Sinclair | December 28, 2022 | February 1, 2023 |

== Reception ==
According to the review aggregator Comic Book Roundup, Dark Web #1 received a score of 7.9/10 based on 9 reviews, Amazing Spider-Man (vol. 6) #15 received a score of 7.6/10 based on 6 reviews, and Amazing Spider-Man (vol. 6) #16 received a score of 8.2/10 based on 4 reviews. In terms of sales in December 2022, per ICv2, (Note: Per ICv2, this sales data was collected from December 4 to December 31, 2022. ICv2 states that this data is generated from the "point-of-sale by the ComicHub system at stores selling American comics around the world. During the period for which these reports were generated, there were over 125 stores using the ComicHub system. As this is a small, non-random sample of over 3,000 stores selling American comics worldwide, these rankings may not be typical for all stores, but do represent a variety of locations and store emphases".) Amazing Spider-Man #15 was #4 in units sold and #6 in dollars invoiced, Dark Web #1 was #5 in units sold and #5 in dollars invoiced, and Amazing Spider-Man #16 was #14 in units sold and #22 in dollars invoiced. Some of the tie-in issues, in the same time period, also made the Top 50 list: Mary Jane & Black Cat #1 was #17 in units sold and #13 in dollars invoiced, Dark Web: X-Men #1 was #21 in units sold and #31 in dollars invoiced and Venom #14 was #46 in units sold.

Amer Sawan, for CBR, highlighted that the Dark Web event showcases a Spider-Man who is more efficient but without morals and responsibility. Sawan wrote that Chasm's actions "revealed just how ruthless Spider-Man is if he didn't have a conscience to hold him back". However, Chasm's actions "have turned him into a monster. [...] What Spider-Man would have to trade for guaranteed proficiency is his humanity. Yes, things would become easier, but it would come at the cost of what makes Spider-Man such a great hero".

Chase Magnett, for ComicBook.com, commented that the Dark Web event acts as both a Spider-Man crossover and a sequel to the 1980s Inferno event, which was mainly focused on X-Men. Magnett wrote that, "yet from the midst of much continuity and nostalgia emerges a story that thrills readers entirely of its own accord in a brilliant introduction to a sincerely promising event. [...] With years of thrilling character work climaxing in a hellish vision of Christmas on Manhattan and many of the best creators at Marvel Comics involved in what's still to come, Dark Web #1 promises readers the gift of another spectacular crossover this holiday season". Magnett called Adam Kubert's art "the story's secret weapon" and stated that "Frank Martin's colors are perfectly suited to the densely paneled pages".

David Brooke, reviewing Dark Web #1 for AIPT, also highlighted Kubert's art and commented that "it appears he's playing around with layout design as he did in Wolverine this past year". Brooke wrote, "I can't say the story is all that deep or that it probes its characters, but it certainly brings an unmistakably 1990s Marvel vibe. It also does the very '90s thing of bringing characters rarely together into one crossover, which is exciting". Tony Thornley, reviewing Dark Web #1 for Comicon, wrote that the issue was "a mixed bag" with the "interpersonal drama of Spider-Man’s personal life" great but that the X-Men were "wooden". Thornley called the issue's visuals "fantastic" – "Kubert's figures are incredibly expressive, and even the bad panels look interesting. [...] Martin uses colors that are slightly watercolor-ish, and it creates a surreal unease as things go to hell".

== Collected editions ==
| Title | Material collected | Format | Pages | Released | ISBN |
|---|---|---|---|---|---|
| Dark Web | Dark Web #1, Amazing Spider-Man (vol. 6) #15-18, Venom (vol. 5) #14-15, Dark Web: X-Men #1-3, Dark Web: Ms. Marvel #1-2, Dark Web Finale | TPB | 344 | 2 May 2023 | 978-1302948603 |
| Amazing Spider-Man by Zeb Wells Vol. 4: Dark Web | Dark Web #1, Amazing Spider-Man (vol. 6) #15-18, Dark Web Finale | TPB | 168 | 16 May 2023 | 978-1302947361 |
| Gold Goblin by Christopher Cantwell | Gold Goblin (vol. 1) #1-5 | TPB | 112 | 20 Jun 2023 | 978-1302947989 |
| Mary Jane and Black Cat: Dark Web by Jed MacKay | Mary Jane and Black Cat (vol. 1) #1-5 | TPB | 128 | 25 Jul 2023 | 978-1302947996 |
| Venom by Al Ewing & Ram V Vol. 3: Dark Web | Venom (vol. 5) #11-15 | TPB | 144 | 2 May 2023 | 978-1302948498 |
| Dark Web Omnibus | Dark Web #1, Amazing Spider-Man (vol. 6) #14–18, Venom (2021) #13–16, Dark Web: X-Men #1–3, Dark Web: Ms. Marvel #1–2, Dark Web Finale #1, Mary Jane & Black Cat #1–5, Gold Goblin #1–5 and material from FCBD 2022: Spider-Man/Venom | Omnibus | 528 | 4 Feb 2025 | John Romita Jr cover: 978-1302961152 |
| Dark Web Omnibus | Dark Web #1, Amazing Spider-Man (vol. 6) #14–18, Venom (2021) #13–16, Dark Web: X-Men #1–3, Dark Web: Ms. Marvel #1–2, Dark Web Finale #1, Mary Jane & Black Cat #1–5, Gold Goblin #1–5 and material from FCBD 2022: Spider-Man/Venom | Omnibus | 528 | 4 Feb 2025 | Ryan Stegman DM cover: 978-1302961169 |
