= Ashley Kafka =

Comic book character

- Ashley Kafka

Publication information
- Publisher: Marvel Comics
- First appearance: Ashley Kafka: The Spectacular Spider-Man #178 (July 1991); Queen Goblin: The Amazing Spider-Man Vol. 5 #88 (February 2022)
- Created by: J. M. DeMatteis (writer); Sal Buscema (artist)

In-story information
- Full name: Ashley Kafka
- Notable aliases: Queen Goblin
- Abilities: Professional psychiatrist; As Queen Goblin: Superhuman strength, speed, stamina, agility, durability, reflexes, and healing; Goblin Gaze

Dr. Ashley Kafka is a fictional character appearing in American comic books published by Marvel Comics. She is usually depicted in stories featuring the superhero Spider-Man. Introduced in The Spectacular Spider-Man #178 (July 1991), she was created by writer J. M. DeMatteis and artist Sal Buscema. The character was inspired by therapeutic hypnotist Frayda Kafka.

In the comics, Kafka is a psychiatrist at the Ravencroft Institute for the Criminally Insane, and an occasional ally of Spider-Man. After being killed by Massacre, she was twice "reanimated" in a cloned body by Ben Reilly and Norman Osborn while keeping her soul intact. After dying in her first cloned body to the Carrion Virus, she went on to become the supervillain Queen Goblin in her second cloned body, being magically corrupted by Osborn's "sins" (the Green Goblin persona).

The character has appeared in several forms of media outside of comics, including animated series and video games. A version of the character reimagined as a male German doctor appeared in the 2014 film The Amazing Spider-Man 2, portrayed by Marton Csokas.

== Publication history ==
Ashley Kafka first appeared in The Spectacular Spider-Man #178 (July 1991), and was created by J.M. DeMatteis and Sal Buscema. She was killed in The Superior Spider-Man #4 (April 2013) before being twice revived in Dead No More: The Clone Conspiracy #2 (November 2016) and Ravencroft #5 (September 2020), becoming the Queen Goblin in The Amazing Spider-Man (vol. 5) #88 (February 2022).

== Fictional character biography ==
Ashley Kafka grew up in New York with her mother and her sister, Norma, who had been born with severe facial defects and was mentally challenged. Kafka looked after Norma while growing up. Their mother died when Kafka was nineteen years old and Norma was left at a psychiatric hospital, where she died a short time later. Kafka went to college at Empire State University, where she studied psychology and earned a degree.

Kafka goes on to become a professional psychologist specializing in the criminally insane and founds the maximum security sanitarium Ravencroft, where she treats its inmates. She is later killed by Massacre during a breakout attempt. It is revealed in the mini-series Ben Reilly: Spider-Man that, prior to her death, Kafka had knowledge of Peter Parker's identity as Spider-Man. Peter reached out to Kakfa for help in dealing with the belief that he was a clone of Spider-Man and not the original.

=== First clone of Kafka ===
In "Dead No More: The Clone Conspiracy", Ben Reilly resurrects Kafka in a clone body, but she dies after undergoing cellular degeneration.

=== Second clone of Kafka ===
In the series Ravencroft, Norman Osborn uses Ben Reilly's cloning method to revive Ashley Kafka in a new clone body as part of a plan to get John Jameson to regain his ability to transform into Man-Wolf.

During the "Sins Rising" storyline, the Sin-Eater uses Mister Negative's powers to corrupt Kafka and use her to free Juggernaut from his cell so that he can steal his powers. The Sin-Eater later attacks Norman Osborn and purges him of his sins. Not wanting to give him to the police, Kafka brings Norman to her office, where he confesses to every bad thing that he has done in his life. Norman claims that his son Harry is Kindred and that he must find a way to stop him before he goes further down the path to vengeance.

During the "Beyond" storyline, Kafka begins working for the Beyond Corporation's Superhero Development division. She is also assigned to be Ben Reilly's therapist. In her latest therapy with Ben, Kafka learns that he has lost faith in the Beyond Corporation following a fight with Doctor Octopus. This leads to Kafka learning that the Beyond Corporation is tampering with Ben's memories.

After obtaining the extracted sins of Norman Osborn, the Beyond Corporation captures Kafka to prevent her from interfering with their plans and infuses her with Norman's sins, transforming her into "Queen Goblin". Queen Goblin breaks her restraints and kills the technicians present. She is given Goblin tech and sent to target Janine Godbe, who has escaped from the Beyond Corporation with information about the company's true agenda.

During the "Dark Web" storyline, Norman Osborn learns of Ashley Kafka's transformation when he encounters her on the rooftop of Alchemax. Norman goes on the defense and manages to evade her. When Queen Goblin nearly kills Spider-Man, Norman kills her in self-defense. Shortly afterward, Kafka is revived by the Goblin formula in her bloodstream.

Queen Goblin works with Kraven the Hunter to drain Norman Osborn's sins from her body and into Kraven's spear while allowing her to retain her powers. The two plan to reunite the sins with Norman Osborn, but this is thwarted when Spider-Man throws himself in front of Norman to protect him and is infused with the sins in his place. After Norman and Kraven purge Norman's sins from Spider-Man, Queen Goblin escapes.

== Powers and abilities ==
Ashley Kafka is an expert at psychology. On her second "reanimation" (with a slightly degraded soul) in a cloned body, Kafka was exposed to the sins of Norman Osborn and was mutated into the Queen Goblin, which gave her a red-skinned goblin-like appearance and granted her enhanced strength, speed, durability, and a healing factor. She also possesses a Goblin Gaze that causes anyone hit by it to relive their trauma.

=== Equipment ===
As the Queen Goblin, the second clone of Ashley Kafka rides a Goblin Glider and wields a high-tech Pumpkin Scepter that has two features. The first feature can be used in a rigid state. The second feature is a chain retractable state. In addition, the Pumpkin Scepter can fire explosive blasts through the Pumpkin Scepters extremities.

== Reception ==
In 2022, Screen Rant included Queen Goblin in their "10 Spider-Man Villains That Are Smarter Than They Seem" list.

== Other versions ==
=== DC crossover ===
Ashley Kafka appears in the Marvel/DC crossover Spider-Man & Batman.

=== Earth-71290 ===
An alternate universe version of Ashley Kafka from Earth-71290 appears in the series Spider-Society.

=== MC2 ===
An alternate universe version of Ashley Kafka from Earth-982 appears in the MC2 imprint. This version married John Jameson, with whom she had a son named Jack.

== In other media ==
=== Television ===
- Ashley Kafka appears in Spider-Man: The Animated Series, voiced by Barbara Goodson.
- Ashley Kafka appears in The Spectacular Spider-Man, voiced by Elisa Gabrielli.

=== Film ===
Dr. Ashley Kafka as he appears in The Amazing Spider-Man 2

- Rachel Kafka appears in David S. Goyer's 1997 draft of Venom as Eddie Brock's love interest.
- Ashley Kafka appears in The Amazing Spider-Man 2, portrayed by Marton Csokas. This version is a male German doctor and leading staff member of the Ravencroft Institute for the Criminally Insane, which is controlled by Oscorp.

=== Video games ===
Ashley Kafka appears in The Amazing Spider-Man 2 film tie-in game.
