= Massacre (Marvel Comics) =

Marvel Comics supervillain

- Massacre as seen on the cover of The Superior Spider-Man #4

Publication information
- Publisher: Marvel Comics
- First appearance: The Amazing Spider-Man #655 (April 2011)
- Created by: Dan Slott; Marcos Martin

In-story information
- Alter ego: Marcus Lyman
- Species: Human
- Abilities: Lack of emotion Genius-level intellect Use of guns and bombs

Massacre is a supervillain appearing in American comic books published by Marvel Comics. He primarily appears in Spider-Man related publications. The character is responsible for the murder of Ashley Kafka, a supporting character in various Spider-Man comic books and adapted media.

== Publication history ==
The character's first appearance was in The Amazing Spider-Man #655 (published April 2011), during the Big Time storyline and was created by Dan Slott and Marcos Martin. The character also appeared in the following issue. Massacre would go on to make his return in the fourth issue of the Superior Spider-Man series. He was killed by the eponymous character in the next issue of that series, before being "reanimated" by Ben Reilly in a cloned body (with his soul intact) during Dead No More: The Clone Conspiracy, being one of the few reanimated to survive the event.

== Fictional character biography ==
Marcus Lyman and his wife Judy Lyman are traders for a Wall Street firm in New York City until an unhappy client plants a car bomb on their vehicle. The bomb kills Judy; Marcus survives, but is left with shrapnel penetrating his brain. The shrapnel is successfully removed, but has damaged Marcus' brain and left him unable to feel emotion. Marcus is sent to the Ravencroft institute, where he is treated by Ashley Kafka. Kafka is disturbed by Marcus and finds that there is nothing she can do to help his mental state, advising that he be held under observation indefinitely.

Now calling himself "Massacre", Marcus Lyman escapes Ravencroft and takes several hostages, killing one of them to prove that he was willing to do so. The police begin attempting negotiations with Massacre. Spider-Man arrives in an attempt to free the hostages, but is barely able to do so due to Massacre's heavy artillery. Massacre manages to escape, though not before Spider-Man secretly places a Spider Tracer on him. Massacre resurfaces not long after, taking another group of hostages at his former Wall Street firm. Now donning a bullet proof costume and magnetic webbing, Spider-Man defeats Massacre and rescues the hostages. Massacre is returned to Ravencroft and admits to having no particular motivation for his crimes.

Kafka becomes increasingly afraid of Massacre, believing him to be her most dangerous patient. Her fears are realized when Massacre kills Kafka and escapes Ravencroft. Massacre embarks on a killing spree, threatening to murder anyone who crosses his path. Massacre soon takes hostages at a Burger Town restaurant and kills them in retaliation for an employee pressing an alarm button. Massacre tracks down the manager of Phizzy Cola, Burger Town's parent company, and offers to help repair Phizzy Cola's public image after the killings by continuing to murder civilians who are wearing the logo of Phizzy Cola's rival company in exchange for money. Fearing for her life, the manager agrees to Massacre's offer. Because of all of the harm Massacre has caused to innocent civilians, the Superior Spider-Man (Doctor Octopus's mind in Spider-Man's body) decides to end Massacre's killing spree by killing him with his own gun.

During the Dead No More: The Clone Conspiracy storyline, Massacre is among the villains resurrected by Jackal and his company New U Technologies, with his soul intact.

== Powers and abilities ==
While Massacre does not have any traditional super-powers, an accident made it nearly impossible for him to feel any emotion. Massacre also has a genius level intellect.

=== Equipment ===
Massacre uses guns and bombs.

== See also ==
- List of Spider-Man enemies
