= Hallows' Eve (Marvel Comics) =

Marvel Comics character

Elizabeth Tyne Hallows' Eve
- Hallows' Eve as depicted in The Amazing Spider-Man (vol. 6) #14 (November 2022). Art by Mike Mayhew.

Publication information
- Publisher: Marvel Comics
- First appearance: Spider-Man: The Lost Years #1 (June 1995)
- Created by: J. M. DeMatteis (writer); John Romita Jr. (artist)

In-story information
- Alter ego: Elizabeth Tyne; Janine Godbe
- Species: Human mutate
- Team affiliations: Beyond Corporation; Blood Hunters
- Notable aliases: Franken-Eve
- Abilities: Use of enchanted masks providing various powers and effects; Immunity to Limbo magic

Elizabeth Tyne is a character appearing in American comic books published by Marvel Comics. Created by writer J.M. DeMatteis and artist John Romita Jr., the character first appeared in Spider-Man: The Lost Years #1 (June 1995). Originally introduced as Elizabeth Tyne, she later adopted the name Janine Godbe. She is later transformed into Hallows' Eve, a persona in which she wields enchanted masks that grant her various special abilities. Tyne is a member of the supernatural team the Blood Hunters. Alongside her teammates, she battles the super-powered vampires called the Bloodcoven.

== Development ==
=== Concept and creation ===
The Hallows' Eve persona of Elizabeth Tyne was teased in Amazing Spider-Man #14, which was revealed at the 2022 San Diego Comic-Con. The codename "Hallows' Eve" references the Christian celebration of Halloween. Chris Arrant of Popverse described Tyne as a 1990s character who evolved from being primarily known as the girlfriend of Ben Reilly to a "spooky" hero.

=== Publication history ===
Elizabeth Tyne debuted in Spider-Man: The Lost Years #1 (June 1995), created by J.M. DeMatteis and John Romita Jr.. She subsequently appeared in several Marvel titles, including Amazing Spider-Man (2022), Dark Web Finale (2023), Amazing Spider-Man Annual (2023), Blood Hunters (2024), Chasm: Curse of Kaine (2024), Amazing Spider-Man (2025), and Amazing Spider-Man Halloween Special (2026).

Tyne has also starred in her own comic books. She headlined Hallows' Eve (2023), her first solo comic book series. The first issue was released on March 1, the second on April 19, the third on May 24, the fourth on June 21, and the final issue on July 26. She subsequently returned in Hallows' Eve: The Big Night (2023), a solo one-shot, which was released on October 25.

== Fictional character biography ==
Elizabeth Tyne murdered her abusive father in self-defense, which led her to flee and change her name. She later met Ben Reilly under her new identity, Janine Godbe, and the two began a relationship. However, Kaine Parker, a former supervillain who chased the couple, kidnapped Godbe. Parker wanted to get revenge on Reilly and forced Godbe to fake her death. She finally reappeared after receiving a fake invention from Parker who impersonated Reilly. Godbe later went to the police and confessed to murdering her father.

Godbe is released at the behest of Marcus Momplaisir of the Beyond Corporation, which was looking for any means they could find to secure Reilly's place as the company's Spider-Man. She reunited with Reilly after her release, unaware it was orchestrated by Maxine Danger of the Beyond Corporation to secure his loyalty as their Spider-Man. Despite Reilly's reassurances, Godbe worries about his safety as Spider-Man persisted, heightened by their restricted life at the Beyond Corporation's tower. During a date, Reilly discreetly gives Beyond Corporation's master hard drive to Godbe. While Reilly meets with Ashley Kafka, Godbe uncovers Beyond Corporation's dark secrets, including their plot to sideline Peter Parker. Under surveillance, she escapes and seeks Mary Jane Watson's help, but the Beyond Corporation sends Queen Goblin to destroy the evidence. Reilly saves Godbe and reveals that the Beyond Corporation has been manipulating his memories.

In the lead-up to the "Dark Web" storyline, Godbe continues living with Reilly as he raids Beyond Corporation safe houses for tech. Driven to reclaim his memories, Reilly constructs a device to reach Limbo. Godbe feels uncertain about his plan and considers leaving him, but when reminded of her dark past as her father's killer, she resolved to support him. After Reilly allies with Madelyne Pryor, ruler of Limbo, Godbe confides her insecurities and desire to support Reilly. Pryor uses S'ym's magic to empower Godbe, transforming her into Hallows' Eve and giving her the ability to manifest masks with different abilities. The trio continue living in Limbo, with Hallows' Eve aiding Pryor in manipulating Venom to further their plans.

After Reilly becomes Chasm and is locked up in the Limbo Embassy, Hallows' Eve desperately tries to free him. Using a werewolf mask, she robs a bank, during which she accidentally scratches a security guard named Simon Carter and turned him into a werewolf. Enlisting Marcus Momplaisir to track Carter down, Hallows' Eve uses a police officer mask to work with Detective Shari Sebbens. Upon finding Carter, Hallows' Eve uses a vampire mask to travel to Carter and found him being abducted by the Beyond Corporation. Her pursuit of the Beyond Corporation van is briefly disrupted by Spider-Man. Upon arriving at the Beyond Corporation, Hallows' Eve finds Maxine Danger holding Momplaisir hostage. Amidst the escape of Hallows' Eve, Momplaisir, and Carter, many of Hallows' Eve's masks are scattered and Danger's men utilizes them to battle the approaching police officers. Hallows' Eve reclaims her bag of masks, removes the werewolf mask from Danger, and leaves her for the police.

On Halloween, Empire State University students Armand, Chad, and Ken use the finger of S'ym to cast a spell, transforming the Halloween party attendants into what they were dressed as. After being overwhelmed by zombies, Hallows' Eve uses her Hulk mask to overcome them and destroy the finger, undoing its effects. Finding that Armand, Chad, and Ken have been transformed into bluebirds, Hallows' Eve transports them to the Limbo embassy and leaves them for the inhabitants.

During the "Blood Hunt" storyline, Dagger, White Widow, and Elsa Bloodstone encounter Hallows' Eve in a vampire mask and mistake her for an actual vampire. She had been wearing the mask to throw off the other vampires loyal to Varnae. When more vampires show up, Hallows' Eve pulls out a Spider-Man mask to save White Widow. After taking out the vampires, the four agree to work together to take out the vampires.

Hallow's Eve, Dagger, Elsa Bloodstone, and White Widow come across Miles Morales fighting a group of vampires. After the Bloodcoven members Smoke Eater, Cruel, and Unusual retreat, Hallows' Eve uses a witch mask in an attempt to use a spell to send Dagger to safety, only to end up casting a spell that harms the vampires. Hallows' Eve, Bloodstone, and White Widow catch up to Miles and an exhausted Dagger when the Bloodcoven intercept them. During the showdown at the Bloodcoven's lair, Cloak teleports the Bloodcoven into a pocket dimension at the edge of the Darkforce dimension. The Blood Hunters go their separate ways.

Following Chasm's escape, he and Hallows' Eve settle in a church until Chasm falls under Druig's mind-control. Hallows' Eve fails to free Chasm from the mind-control and is attacked by Druig. After Kaine Parker stops Druig, Chasm joins Hallows' Eve in fighting Mole Man's forces.

== Powers and abilities ==
Tyne possesses immunity to Limbo-based magic.

=== Enchanted Masks ===
Elizabeth Tyne wields a collection of enchanted masks, each conferring distinct superhuman abilities, that are kept in the bag that she carries. These masks are imbued with chaos magic from Limbo. Each is modeled after a particular character, allowing Tyne to adopt their abilities, traits, and even speech patterns:

- A Frankenstein's Monster mask gives her the powers of Frankenstein's Monster.
- A Human Fly-inspired mask gives her abilities similar to Human Fly, including the ability to generate acid.
- A werewolf mask gives her the appearance and abilities of a werewolf.
- A model mask gives her the appearance of a Hollywood icon.
- A ghost mask allows her to become intangible and invisible.
- A police officer mask allows her to pose as a police officer.
- A vampire mask grants her the supernatural abilities of a vampire including flight.
- A black cat mask gives her the appearance of a black cat-like creature.
- A gorilla mask transforms her into a gorilla.
- A mummy mask transforms her into a mummy.
- A witch mask enables her to use magic despite her lack of formal mystic training.
- A Captain America mask provides superhuman strength, speed, and agility while also possessing a shield.
- A Hulk mask gives her superhuman strength.
- A slasher mask gives her the powers of a slasher from a slasher-based horror film.
- A Spider-Man mask gives her the webslinging and other powers of Spider-Man.
- A Wasp mask grants her the powers of Wasp.
- A Kaiju mask enables her to turn into a Godzilla-like Kaiju.

== Reception ==
Taylor Black Forsberg of Screen Rant described Elizabeth Tyne as a breakout horror-themed antihero and noted the character gained cosplay attention after her reintroduction as Hallows' Eve. In 2022, the introduction of Tyne as Hallows' Eve in Amazing Spider-Man #14 was credited as one of the reasons the comic book sold out. Marc Deschamps of ComicBook.com suggested that Elizabeth Tyne would be a strong candidate for inclusion in future Marvel's Spider-Man video games. He noted that while her popularity supports her potential appearance in future titles, it is the character's versatility that would make her a "compelling addition" to Insomniac games.

== Literary reception ==
=== Hallows' Eve (2023) ===
ComicHub reported that Hallows' Eve #1 was the third best-selling comic book in March 2023. The ComicHub Top 200 Comic Books sales chart reflects sales data collected from the ComicHub system at comic shops across the globe that sell American comics. This report was created based on information from more than 125 stores that used the ComicHub system during the reporting period. Marvel Comics also announced that the issue was sold out. The Hallows' Eve trade paper back was the ninth best-selling graphic novel in November 2023.

Alexander Jones of Multiversity Comics gave Hallows' Eve #1 a score of eight out of ten and said the character of Hallows' Eve is characterized in a fascinating way. Jones praised the writing and the artwork, especially the expressions of Hallows' Eve when she switches masks. They also described the comic book as a strong expansion of the Spider-Man universe. Chase Magnett of ComicBook.com gave Hallows' Eve #1 a grade of four out of five and called it an essential reading. They described it as accessible for readers, well-crafted, and thrilling. Magnett praised the artwork and said the comic series has potential. David Brooke of AIPT Comics gave it a score of eight out of ten. They praised the originality of the powers and costume used by Hallows' Eve's. Brooke described the series as a good start, saying it leaves room to further explore the different featured characters.

=== Hallows' Eve: The Big Night (2023) ===
ComicHub reported that Hallows' Eve: The Big Night #1 was the 124th best-selling comic book in October 2023. The ComicHub Top 200 Comic Books sales chart reflects sales data collected from the ComicHub system at comic shops across the globe that sell American comics. This report was created based on information from more than 125 stores that used the ComicHub system during the reporting period.

Hannah Rose of Comic Book Resources said that Hallows' Eve: The Big Night #1 is a fun and thrilling new chapter for the character, praising writer Erica Shultz for exploring the character's comedic and heroic potential. She found the 25-page issue to have tight and straightforward writing, blending inner monologue, exposition, and other devices effectively. Rose stated that the story's use of masks – both Hallows' Eve's superpowered ones and those worn by Halloween partygoers – added to its charm, with the issue bringing a balance of camp and intrigue. She appreciated the subtle character development of Hallows' Eve, who, up until now, has hovered between anti-villain and anti-hero, but here embraces a more heroic role. Rose also praised the visuals, noting how artist Michael Dowling and colorist Brian Reber created a whimsical, vintage Halloween vibe that complemented the fun, spooky tone of the story. She found the issue to be a strong start, offering a potential new role for Hallows' Eve as a hero, with the perfect mix of levity and intrigue. Tim Adams of ComicBook.com gave Hallows' Eve: The Big Night #1 a grade of four out of five and stated that he had not paid much attention to Hallows' Eve before, but praised the Halloween-themed one-shot for giving the character a chance to shine. He found the moment when Hallows^ Eve slipped on a Captain America mask to be endearing, helping him connect with her. Adams stated that the story was the perfect vehicle to showcase her abilities and personality. He appreciated the heroics displayed by the protagonist, suggesting that the one-shot might offer a path to redemption for Hallows' Eve.

== In other media ==
=== Television ===
An original villainous iteration of Hallows' Eve appears in Spidey and the Avengers: Halloween Team-Up!, voiced by Este Haim. This version is a witch who was trapped in a small cauldron. She wields a magic staff that produces spells when she rhymes.

=== Merchandise ===
- In 2023, Hasbro released an action figure of Hallows' Eve as part of the Marvel Legends action figure line.
- In 2024, Gentle Giant Ltd released a statuette of Hallows' Eve for Halloween.
- In 2025, Funko released a Funko Pop figure of Hallows' Eve as part of the Strange Tales figure line.
