= Gold Goblin =

Comic book series by Christopher Cantwell

Publication information
- Publisher: Marvel Comics
- Schedule: Monthly
- Publication date: November 2022 – March 2023
- No. of issues: 5
- Main character(s): Norman Osborn / Gold Goblin; Ben Reilly / Chasm

Creative team
- Written by: Christopher Cantwell
- Artist(s): Lan Medina; Rafael Pimentel

Gold Goblin is an five-issue comic book series written by Christopher Cantwell and drawn by Lan Medina and Rafael Pimentel. Published by Marvel Comics as a tie-in with the event series Dark Web, the story revolves around Norman Osborn, as, forcibly cleansed of his sins but remembering everything he did as the Green Goblin, he attempts to give being a superhero a try, with the media dubbing him the Gold Goblin.

The series received a positive critical reception.

== Publication history ==
In November 2022, a Gold Goblin series was launched as a tie-in with the event series Dark Web, following the sin-purged Norman Osborn as he tries his hand at being a superhero, filled with magically-induced shame for his past actions as the Green Goblin following the events of Sinister War. Written by Christopher Cantwell with art by Lan Medina and Rafael Pimentel, the series ran for five issues from November 16, 2022 to March 15, 2023.

== Reception ==
Gold Goblin received good reviews.

== Collected edition ==
Title	Material collected	Published date	ISBN
Gold Goblin	Gold Goblin (vol. 1) #1–5	June 21, 2023	ISBN 978-1-3029-4798-9
