= Christopher Cantwell (writer) =

American writer, producer, and director

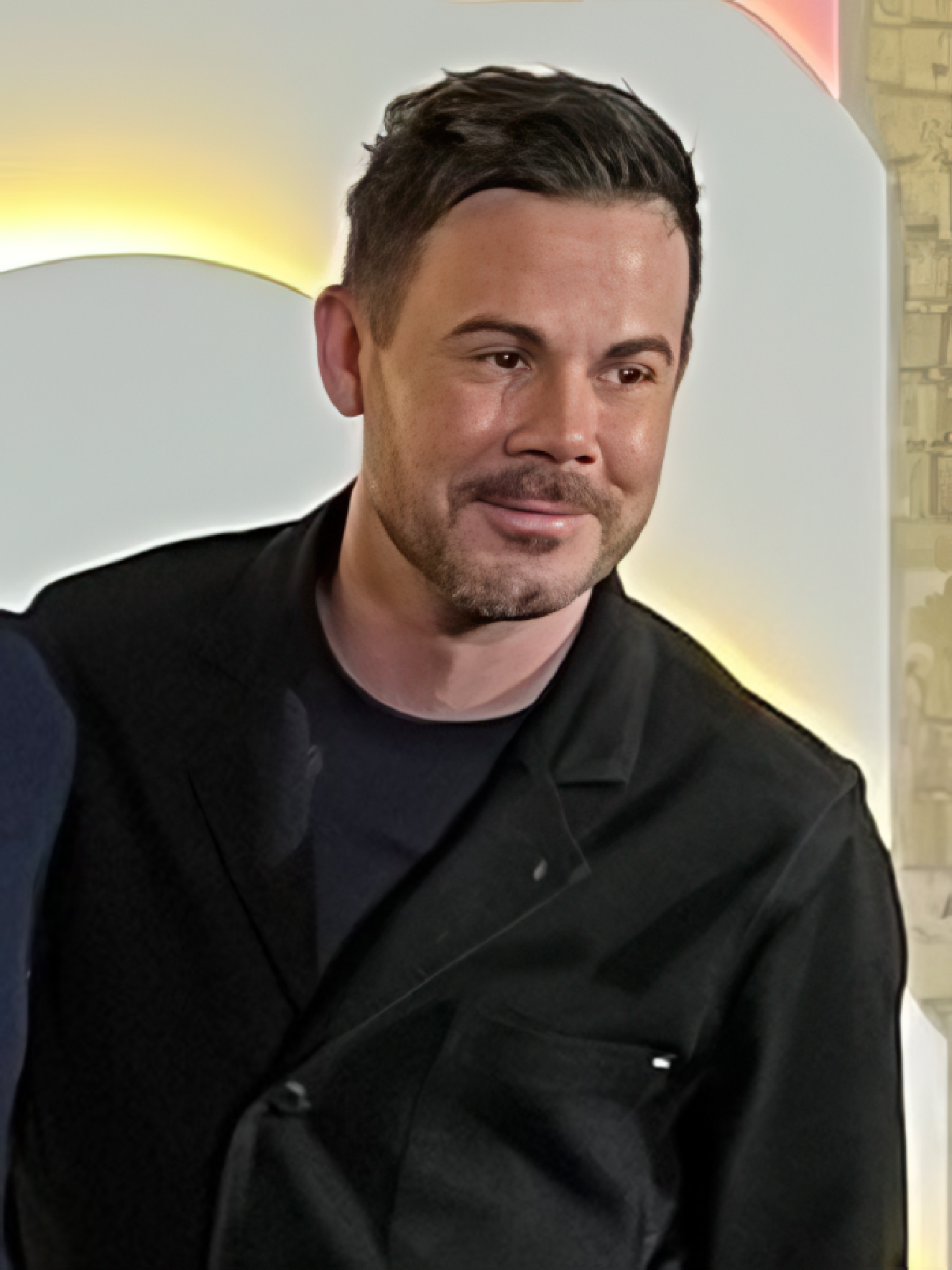
- Cantwell at the 10th anniversary panel for Halt and Catch Fire
- Born: Chicago, Illinois, U.S.
- Education: University of Southern California
- Occupations: Writer, producer, director
- Spouse: Elizabeth Cantwell
- Children: 3

Christopher Cantwell is an American writer, producer, and director who has worked in television, film, and comic books. He is best known as one of the two co-creators of the TV series Halt and Catch Fire, for which he also served as a producer, showrunner, screenwriter, and director. He also directed the 2019 film The Parts You Lose. Cantwell is a writer of comic books that includes The Blue Flame, She Could Fly, Everything, Doctor Doom, The Mask, Iron Man, Captain America, Gold Goblin, and Star Wars: Obi-Wan. He served as an executive producer of the television adaptation of the comic book Paper Girls.

== Background ==
Cantwell was born in Chicago, Illinois. In the 1980s, the family moved to Dallas, Texas. Cantwell attended the University of Southern California and enrolled in its screenwriting program as an undergraduate. He began writing with Christopher C. Rogers in August 2010, and they created Halt and Catch Fire together.

Cantwell wrote a comic book series for the character Doctor Doom. It was nominated for a 2020 Eisner Award for Best New Series.

He currently lives in Highland Park, California, with his wife, Elizabeth Cantwell, a writer, and their three children. On January 14, 2021, he came out as bisexual on his Twitter page.

== Credits ==
Cantwell's screen credits
Year(s)	Title	Medium	Notes
2009	Krantz	Film	Writer and director
2011	Our Footloose Remake	Film	Co-director
2014–2017	Halt and Catch Fire	Television	Co-creator, co-showrunner, writer, director, and executive producer
2019	The Parts You Lose	Film	Director
2022	Paper Girls	Television	Writer and executive producer
2026	The Terror: Devil in Silver	Television	Showrunner, writer and executive producer

Cantwell's comic writing credits
Year	Title	Notes
2018	She Could Fly	
2019	She Could Fly: The Lost Pilot	
2019	The Mask: I Pledge Allegiance to the Mask!	
2019	Doctor Doom	Nominated for 2020 Eisner Award for Best New Series
2019	Everything	
2020	Iron Man	
2021	The Blue Flame	
2021	The United States of Captain America	
2021	Regarding the Matter of Oswald's Body	
2022	Star Wars: Obi-Wan	
2022	Angel	
2022	Briar	
2022	Namor the Sub-Mariner: Conquered Shores	
2022	Moon Knight: Black, White & Blood	
2022	Gold Goblin	
2022	Thanos: Death Notes	
2023	Star Trek: Defiant	
2023	Hellcat	
2023	Batman: The Brave & the Bold	Superman story
