= Lan Medina =

Filipino comic book artist

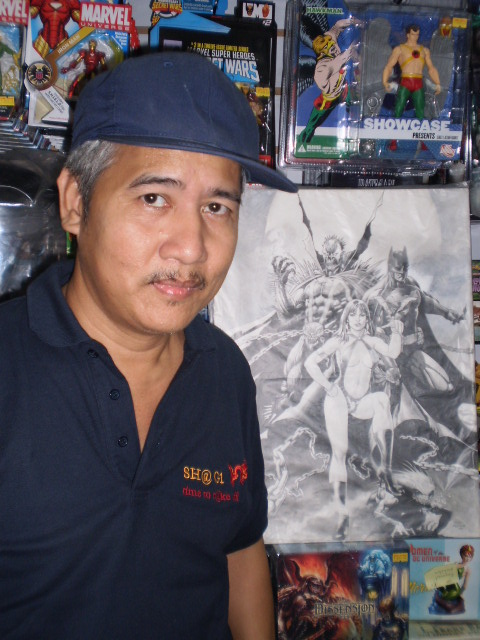
- Born: Rolando Medina; December 22, 1961 (age 64)
- Area: Artist
- Notable works: Fables; Aria; District X Gold Goblin; The Punisher: MAX
- Awards: Eisner Award for Best Serialized Story (2003)

Rolando Medina, commonly known as Lan Medina (born December 22, 1961), is a Filipino comic book artist best known for his work on Fables, Aria, District X, Gold Goblin, and The Punisher: MAX imprint.

== Awards ==
In 2003, Medina won an Eisner Award for Best Serialized Story in 2003 for Fables issues 1-5 "Legends in Exile."

In the 2007 Glyph Comics Awards, the Fan Award for Best Comic was won by Storm, by Eric Jerome Dickey, David Yardin & Lan Medina, and Jay Leisten & Sean Parsons.

== Selected bibliography ==
- American Century
- Gold Goblin
