= Norman Osborn =

Marvel Comics supervillain

- Textless cover of Dark Reign: The Goblin Legacy #1 (July 2009). Art by Kalman Andrasofszky.

Publication information
- Publisher: Marvel Comics
- First appearance: As Green Goblin: The Amazing Spider-Man #14 (July 1964); As Norman Osborn: The Amazing Spider-Man #37 (June 1966)
- Created by: Stan Lee; Steve Ditko

In-story information
- Full name: Norman Virgil Osborn
- Species: Human mutate (Note: In Marvel Comics, the term "mutate" is used as a noun to designate characters that received superpowers from an external source, as opposed to Marvel's mutants.)
- Team affiliations: Oscorp; Sinister Twelve; Commission on Superhuman Activities; Thunderbolts; H.A.M.M.E.R. Dark Avengers; Dark X-Men; Cabal; Goblin Nation
- Notable aliases: Green Goblin, Iron Patriot, Overload, Super-Adaptoid, Mason Banks, Goblin King, Red Goblin, Gold Goblin, Spider-Man
- Abilities: Superhuman strength, speed, stamina, agility, durability, reflexes, and healing; Genius-level intellect; Proficient scientist; Skilled hand-to-hand combatant; Utilizes Halloween-themed paraphernalia, high-tech gadgetry, and a Goblin Glider equipped with various weapons

Norman Virgil Osborn is a character appearing in American comic books published by Marvel Comics. Created by writer Stan Lee and artist Steve Ditko, the character first appeared in The Amazing Spider-Man #14 (July 1964) as the first and best-known incarnation of the Green Goblin. He has since endured as one of the superhero Spider-Man's most prominent villains and is regarded as one of his three archenemies, alongside Doctor Octopus and Venom.

Norman Osborn is the amoral industrialist head of science conglomerate Oscorp and the father of Harry Osborn, the best friend of Spider-Man's alter ego Peter Parker. Osborn, in part due to the death of his wife, is obsessed with attaining as much power as possible and maintains a cold disposition towards Harry, openly favoring Peter for his intellect. In his origin story, Osborn is exposed to an experimental formula that enhances his physical abilities and intellect at the cost of his sanity. He becomes a criminal mastermind known as the Green Goblin and uses an arsenal of advanced, Halloween-themed equipment, including grenade-like Pumpkin Bombs, razor sharp bats, and a flying Goblin Glider, to terrorize New York City.

Osborn has been part of defining Spider-Man stories, including the murder of Gwen Stacy—Peter's love interest—in "The Night Gwen Stacy Died" (1973) and the orchestration of the "Clone Saga" (1994–1996). While his primary foe is Spider-Man, Osborn has often come into conflict with the Human Torch, Iron Man, Captain America and other superheroes in the Marvel Universe. Although Osborn sometimes works with other supervillains such as Doctor Doom and Loki and groups like the Sinister Six and the Dark Avengers, these relationships often collapse due to his obsessive desire for unbridled power. Osborn's largest overarching story came during the line-wide "Dark Reign" and Siege comic book events, during which he originated the persona of the Iron Patriot. On being stripped of his "sins" by Kindred on behalf of A.I. Harry Osborn as revenge for selling human Harry's soul to Mephisto, the forcibly-repentant Norman becomes the superhero Gold Goblin, starring in Gold Goblin.

The character has been in various top villain lists as one of Spider-Man's greatest enemies and one of the greatest comic book villains of all time. The character's popularity has seen him appear on a variety of merchandise, inspire real-world structures (such as theme park attractions) and be referenced in a number of media. He has been adapted to serve as Spider-Man's adversary in live-action, animated, and video game incarnations. Willem Dafoe played the character in Sam Raimi's Spider-Man film trilogy (2002–2007) and reprised the role in the Marvel Cinematic Universe film Spider-Man: No Way Home (2021), while Chris Cooper played the character in the film The Amazing Spider-Man 2 (2014).

== Publication history ==
The Amazing Spider-Man #14 (July 1964), the Green Goblin's first appearance; the character originally used a turbo-fan-powered "flying broomstick". Cover art by Steve Ditko.

Marvel Comics editor and head writer Stan Lee and artist Steve Ditko are credited with creating the character; they collaborated on how the character would be portrayed. According to Ditko: "Stan's synopsis for the Green Goblin had a movie crew, on location, finding an Egyptian-like sarcophagus. Inside was an ancient, mythological demon, the Green Goblin. He naturally came to life. On my own, I changed Stan's mythological demon into a human villain".

The Green Goblin debuted in The Amazing Spider-Man #14. At this time his identity was unknown, but he proved popular and reappeared in later issues, which made a point of his secret identity. According to both Stan Lee and John Romita, Sr., who replaced Ditko as the title's artist, Lee always wanted the Green Goblin to be someone Peter Parker knew, while Ditko wanted his civilian identity to be someone who had not yet been introduced. Lee elaborated: "Steve wanted him to turn out to be just some character that we had never seen before. Because, he said, in real life, very often a villain turns out to be somebody that you never knew. And I felt that that would be wrong. I felt, in a sense, it would be like cheating the reader. ... if it's somebody you didn't know and had never seen, then what was the point of following all the clues? I think that frustrates the reader". However, Lee prefaced this statement by admitting that, due to his self-professed poor memory, he may have been confusing the Green Goblin with a different character, and in an earlier essay he had said that he could not remember whether Norman Osborn being the Green Goblin was his idea or Ditko's. Ditko has maintained that it was his idea, even claiming that he had decided on it before the first Green Goblin story was finished. Though Osborn would not be introduced by name until The Amazing Spider-Man #37, Ditko has said that a character he drew in the background of two panels in issue #23 was intended to be Osborn, seeded in advance of the reveal. Lending credence to Ditko's claim, this then-nameless character—a member of a businessmen's club and a friend of J. Jonah Jameson—reappeared in a scene in The Amazing Spider-Man #25, visiting Jameson at his office, then again in the businessman's club in #26 and #27, and when Norman was formally introduced in issue #37, he too was stated to be a member of the club and friend of Jameson's.

Ditko left the series with issue #38, just one issue after Norman Osborn was introduced as the father of Harry Osborn. The first issue without Ditko saw the Green Goblin unmasked. John Romita, Sr., who replaced Ditko as the title's artist, recalled:

Stan wouldn't have been able to stand it if Ditko did the story and didn't reveal that the Green Goblin was Norman Osborn. I didn't know there was any doubt about Osborn being the Goblin. I didn't know that Ditko had just been setting Osborn up as a straw dog. I just accepted the fact that it was going to be Norman Osborn when we plotted it. I had been following the last couple of issues and didn't think there was really much mystery about it. Looking back, I doubt the Goblin's identity would have been revealed in Amazing #39 if Ditko had stayed on.

In the landmark story "The Night Gwen Stacy Died" (The Amazing Spider-Man #121-122), the Green Goblin kills Gwen Stacy and later dies in a fight against Spider-Man. However, the story's writer, Gerry Conway, had Harry Osborn adopt the Green Goblin identity in the aftermath of "The Night Gwen Stacy Died", later remarking that "I never had any intention of getting rid of the Green Goblin as a concept". Harry Osborn's becoming the Green Goblin was mostly well received, with fans remarking that Harry was more menacing than his father had ever been. Writer Roger Stern later introduced the Hobgoblin to replace the Green Goblin as Spider-Man's archenemy.

=== Return ===
During the "Clone Saga", a retcon was made, which determined that Norman Osborn survived the events of The Amazing Spider-Man #122 and had been playing a behind-the-scenes role in Spider-Man's adventures since then. During the "Clone Saga", the Spider-Man writers were met with a massive outcry from many readers after the decision to replace Peter Parker with his clone Ben Reilly as the true Spider-Man. Eventually, the writers decided to reveal that one of Spider-Man's arch-enemies had been manipulating events from behind the scenes. The initial plan was to use Mephisto, but they felt a more down-to-earth character was needed. It was then suggested that the semi-zombified cyborg "Gaunt" be revealed as Harry Osborn (who was killed in The Spectacular Spider-Man #200).

Gaunt was a late entry to the controversial storyline, created mainly as a plot device to return Harry to life; the plan for the character included Harry regaining his humanity, taking credit for tricking Peter into thinking he was a clone, and assuming his father's Green Goblin identity. However, this narrative was rejected by newly promoted editor in chief Bob Harras, and eventually Norman was chosen to be the mastermind. Following the Clone Saga, Green Goblin re-established himself as a supervillain and Spider-Man's nemesis, serving as the main antagonist of several arcs thereafter.

Osborn returns in Peter Parker: Spider-Man #75 and is blown up at the end of the issue. It is shown in The Spectacular Spider-Man #250 that he has recovered, and he returns to his civilian life. Without the Green Goblin identity, Osborn would then go on to attack Spider-Man indirectly, through minions and via smear campaigns designed to portray him as a monster. However, Norman would still wear his Green Goblin costume when needed.

=== New roles ===
When Spider-Man revealed his public identity, Osborn is apprehended by S.H.I.E.L.D. agents in Paris. Following the Civil War story arc, Warren Ellis began writing Thunderbolts, and Osborn was brought into this title as the director of the eponymous team. He was one of several characters offered to Ellis, who picked him because, according to Thunderbolts editor Molly Lazer, "[t]here was something about Norman, his instability, and his fixation with Spider-Man that Warren liked, so he's in the book!" Ellis admitted not being very familiar with the character, saying: "All I remember of the Norman Osborn character was from the Spider-Man reprints my parents used to buy me when I was very young, and Norman Osborn was this guy with a weird rippled crewcut who was always sweating and his eyes were always bulging out of his head. That guy as a Donald Rumsfeld-like public governmental figure... [Joe Quesada] talked me into writing the book while I was still laughing". Lazer confirmed that the new team was answerable to the Commission on Superhuman Activities, giving him the opportunity to do what he wanted: "He's a free man with a lot of power .... And his agenda, well, it's not that secret. He wants to get Spider-Man".

Writer Christos Gage took over for the Secret Invasion tie-in stories, which end with Osborn taking credit for the defeat of the Skrulls after he kills the Skrull queen Veranke. This allowed the character to be placed into an influential position in the aftermath of Dark Reign. Although the dark turn at the end was always part of the plan for the storyline, Brian Michael Bendis, Secret Invasion's writer, says that Osborn was picked for the leading role because of the changes implemented by Ellis.

Meanwhile, Andy Diggle took over the writing of Thunderbolts. He introduced new characters to serve as Osborn's black ops team, explaining:

To quote the movie Speed, he's 'crazy, not stupid'. He's clearly fiercely intelligent and a natural born leader, with the ego and competitive drive to succeed against all odds. He also just happens to be crazy as a shithouse rat. [...] I think the secret to understanding Norman is that he doesn't realize he's the villain. He thinks he's the hero. He truly believes that he deserves public adulation, and it bugs the hell out of him that so-called 'superheroes' are getting it instead of him.

He appeared as a regular character in the Dark Avengers series from issue #1 (March 2009) through issue #16 (June 2010), as well as the mini-series "Siege", which saw Norman being arrested for his crimes, following the events of the Civil War storyline.

The first was "Brand New Ways To Die" which featured Norman and the Thunderbolts versus Spider-Man and the original Venom. His second appearance explained that following Mephisto's alteration of Spider-Man's past, Norman's return was significantly altered. He had returned earlier than he had originally, and, due to concern for his son's mental wellbeing after once again being the Green Goblin, had arranged for Harry's death to be faked, with help from Mysterio. In his final appearance in the storyline, Norman attempts to convince Harry to become a super-hero so that Norman can kill his son off and exploit said demise. It is also revealed that he was sleeping with the supervillain Menace (Harry's ex-girlfriend), with Norman believing that the villain's child she was carrying was his.

A five issue mini-series followed, written by writer Kelly Sue DeConnick and artist Emma Rios. The mini-series would lead into a dual storyline running in the pages of The New Avengers #17–24 and The Avengers vol. 4 #18–24, in which the character formed a new version of the Dark Avengers and ultimately garnered new powers, having turned himself into a Super-Adaptoid.

== Fictional character biography ==
=== Early life ===
Norman was born in New Haven, Connecticut, as the son of wealthy industrialist Amberson Osborn. Amberson, a brilliant student in the fields of science, became an alcoholic after losing control of his manufacturing company and subsequently his entire fortune, and became physically abusive toward the family. Norman quickly came to despise his father, resolving to be a better breadwinner while developing early homicidal tendencies as a means of relieving the stress of his father's abuse.

In college, where he studied chemistry, business administration, and electrical engineering, Norman meets his college sweetheart, who eventually marries him and has their son Harold "Harry" Osborn. In his adulthood, with the help of his ESU/Empire State University college professor Mendel Stromm, he co-founds the chemical company Oscorp Industries and establishes himself as CEO and President. The company was hugely successful, and Norman re-gained the wealth that he had lost during his childhood. However, his wife becomes ill and dies when Harry is barely a year old, the stress of which pushes Norman to work harder, leading him to emotionally neglect Harry.

Hoping to gain more control of Oscorp Industries, Osborn accused Stromm of embezzlement and has his partner arrested and shares in his company sold to him. Searching his former mentor's possessions, Norman discovers incomplete notes for an experimental strength/intelligence enhancement formula; a botched attempt to recreate Stromm's work results in an explosion that douses Norman with the imperfect formula. The accident greatly increases his intelligence and physical abilities as intended, but also has the side-effect of driving him into self-destructive insanity, just like his father from years ago.

=== The original Green Goblin ===
Norman Osborn as Green Goblin on the cover of Secret Invasion: Dark Reign #1 (Dec. 2008). Art by Bryan Hitch.

Norman adopts the Green Goblin identity with the goal of being the leader of organized crime in New York City, and intends to cement his position by defeating Spider-Man. Acting on his own as the Goblin, or through his employment of other super-criminals such as the Headsman, he would harass Spider-Man many times, but fail to achieve his goal. Soon, Stromm returns from prison, and attempts to exact revenge on Osborn using an army of robots, but Norman is saved by Spider-Man, and Stromm apparently dies of a heart attack.

In order to discover his nemesis's secret identity, Osborn secretly exposes Spider-Man to a gas that nullifies his spider-sense. This allows Osborn to stalk Spider-Man until he learns that his nemesis is Peter Parker, a college student and his son's classmate and best friend. While Parker is going about civilian life, Osborn surprises and knocks Parker out with an asphyxiation grenade, taking the youth to his waterfront base. After unmasking himself to Parker, the latter goads him into recounting how he became the Goblin, and uses the time to break free. In the ensuing battle, Spider-Man accidentally knocks Osborn into a mass of electrical wires, wiping out his memory. Feeling sorry for his nemesis, and wishing to avoid the shame that would befall the Osborn family (especially Parker's best friend Harry), Spider-Man destroys the Goblin costume in the resulting fire and tells the authorities that Osborn lost his memory while helping to defeat the Goblin.

Soon, Osborn is troubled by repressed memories of the Goblin and Spider-Man. After a presentation on supervillains by NYPD Captain George Stacy restores Osborn's memory, he experiences a brief return to his Goblin persona. While abducting Parker's friends and threatening Parker's elderly aunt, he is exposed to one of his own "psychedelic bombs", causing a relapse of amnesia.

Later, Osborn stumbles upon an old Goblin hideout which, again, restores his memory. However, the shock of seeing Harry hospitalized after overdosing on drugs causes Osborn's amnesia to return once more. After the final restoration of his memories, the Goblin kidnaps and takes Gwen Stacy to a bridge. During Spider-Man's rescue attempt, Osborn knocks Gwen off the bridge, resulting in the girl's death. Spider-Man, traumatised and obsessed with revenge, confronts the villain at his lair and beats him near to death. A last-ditch attempt to ram Spider-Man with his glider ends with the Goblin being fatally impaled by its spikes.

=== Return ===
Since his presumed death, Osborn had been retroactively established as an unseen character. While he lies in the morgue, it is revealed that the Goblin formula gave him a previously unknown healing factor which restores him to life; he also murders a homeless man and plants the disfigured body in his costume to feign his death. No longer suffering from bouts of amnesia, Norman escapes to Europe, where he can move freely and unnoticed (as later revealed, he was in France for some time). During this time abroad, believed dead by the general public, he orchestrates several plots, including replacing May Parker with a genetically altered actress, and faking his own son's death (after Mephisto's manipulations of the timeline); prior to the timeline change, Harry's corpse, at one point, was exhumed and tested.

Most significantly, however, he utilizes his fortune to build a vast network of criminals, spies, dupes and co-conspirators to help engineer what would be an almost impossibly complex and meticulously planned plot to destroy Spider-Man's life. To achieve this, he becomes the leader of the Scrier cabal, taking as his pawns Seward Trainer, Judas Traveller, the Jackal and the cyborg Gaunt/Stromm, all of whom he utilizes to carry out revenge against Parker. It is this group of individuals who are crucial in duping Parker into believing that the youth is actually a clone of himself created by Jackal, while claiming that the clone – who comes to be known as Ben Reilly – is actually the original. Frustrated by Parker's perseverance despite everything that's been inflicted, Osborn publicly reveals that he's alive on Halloween. During the battle that ensues between the two, Osborn attempts to kill Parker by impaling his nemesis with his goblin glider. When Reilly sacrifices himself to save Parker from Osborn (and immediately deteriorates upon death as all of the Jackal's clones do), Parker makes his discovery of actually being the original. During this same period, Osborn was also responsible for the murder or abduction of Peter & Mary Jane's newborn daughter, after one of his allies apparently caused the stillbirth of the baby.

Returning to his former seat of power, Osborn regains control of his business and also buys out the Daily Bugle, humiliating former friend and societal peer J. Jonah Jameson as the latter no longer has control over the newspaper. He also torments Ben Urich and demands a retraction over an exposé of his time as the Goblin, providing faked evidence that he never was the supervillain, despite Urich's extensive research. However, he saves his most sadistic treatment for Peter, acting not only as a constant reminder of all the pain he's inflicted on his nemesis over the years, but a looming threat that could strike at any time. This build-up of pressure eventually makes Spider-Man snap by savagely beating the civilian and non-resistant Osborn in front of the latter's CCTV, which, combined with Osborn convincing the Trapster to frame Spider-Man for murder, results in Spider-Man being a fugitive again. To get around this, Peter adopts four new identities, using two of these identities to convince Trapster to expose Osborn's scheme, and provide fake evidence that the individual that beat up Osborn was an impostor.

For a time, Osborn retires his costumed persona and uses a stand-in so as not to be suspected of being the Green Goblin. This fifth Goblin kidnaps Norman's grandson and clashes with the wanted and injured Spider-Man. Norman also crosses paths with Roderick Kingsley and initiates a hostile takeover of Kingsley's corporate empire, in retaliation for raiding the Goblin's arsenal and identity. While his stand-in is masquerading as the Goblin, Osborn joins a cult, hoping to receive great power from the 'Gathering of Five', which will grant the participants Power, Knowledge, Immortality, Madness or Death, but while he believes that he will receive Power, he is instead given Madness, which worsens his already mental instability, and threatens the world with genetic bombs. It is during this time that Peter learns May is alive and Osborn's actress died in May's place. Osborn's complete madness is evident, as he hallucinates unmasking and killing Peter; yet in reality Peter easily defeats him. He is rescued from custody thereafter by his cabal of henchmen.

A few months later, the highly unstable Osborn has partially regained his sanity with the help of anti-psychotic drugs. He comes to see Parker as the son he had always wanted and attempts to have Parker take on the Green Goblin mantle using physiological torture, but ultimately fails. Osborn's next plan involves using Flash Thompson drive drunk a truck into Midtown High School, resulting in an accident that causes Thompson brain damage. This successfully enrages Parker into what Osborn anticipates will be a climactic battle. During this confrontation, the emotionally weary Parker tells Osborn of being tired of their constant battle, and declares a truce.

Osborn's Goblin identity is revealed to the public once again through an investigation by Jessica Jones, after Osborn murders one of the reporters from the Daily Bugle. After a battle with Spider-Man and Luke Cage, Osborn is arrested and sent to prison for the first time. However, things were far from over. From behind bars, Osborn again masterminded a plan against Spider-Man. This time, he has MacDonald "Mac" Gargan as Scorpion kidnap May. The plan was for Spider-Man to break Osborn out of prison in exchange for Parker's aunt's life. Peter reluctantly agreed and with the help of the Black Cat proceeded to break Osborn out, only to have twelve of his greatest enemies waiting on the outside.

Osborn had assembled a team of supervillains. However, Mary Jane Watson had contacted S.H.I.E.L.D., and the villains were faced not only by Spider-Man, but the combined might of Captain America, Iron Man, Yellowjacket, Daredevil and the Fantastic Four. During the fracas, the Goblin manages to escape and kidnap Mary Jane, taking Peter's love interest to the George Washington Bridge in order to replay the murder of the last love interest. However, Doctor Octopus intervenes, attacking the Goblin. Spider-Man is able to save Mary Jane after a bolt of lightning sends the two villains into the river. Following some verbal clues from the Goblin, Peter also discovers where he had hidden May, and rescues the latter as well. It is revealed that Osborn sent Peter a letter before the fight, thanking Peter for giving his life meaning and purpose, but Peter never received the letter due to moving to a different residence.

Years after Gwen's death, it is revealed that Osborn had a one-night stand with Gwen, which led to Gwen's pregnancy with his illegitimate twin children. Osborn thus has three motives for killing Gwen; revenge against Spider-Man, to prevent Gwen from talking of their affair and creating a scandal, and to take their children to raise by himself, thus being his ideal heirs. Mary Jane was the only person who knew of their encounter and their children's existence prior to Gwen's death, despising Osborn for his immoral behaviors long before discovering he's the villainous Goblin. Gabriel and Sarah (who rapidly aged to adulthood years because of the Goblin formula in their genes) return to attack Peter as Osborn has the twins believe that Peter is the twins' father who abandoned the two and responsible for Gwen's death to which Peter learned the details of Gwen's past with Osborn and the twins from Mary Jane. Peter is able to convince Sarah of Osborn's villainy, the truth of Sarah's paternity and circumstances of Gwen's death, and stabilized the Goblin physiology with a blood transfusion due to Peter's blood type matching Sarah's. Meanwhile, Gabriel personally learns the truth of his relation to Osborn after watching a video message at one of the Goblin lairs, aligning with his father to stabilize his own condition using a variation of the Goblin formula at the cost of sanity. All of this was retconned during the Sinister War story-arc, when AI version of Harry Osborn's mind reveals that he masterminded a plan to get revenge of both his father and Peter Parker: he created the twins in a lab with the help of Mendel Stromm and he brainwashed Norman and Mary Jane Watson (thanks to Mysterio) into believing Gwen cheated on Peter with Osborn. The twins aged rapidly because of clonation issues (and not because of Osborn's Goblin Serum), but eventually got better just as Harry started to use them as soldiers for his war against Norman and Spider-Man.

=== H.A.M.M.E.R. and the Dark Avengers ===
Norman Osborn as Iron Patriot on the cover of Dark Avengers vol. 1, #1 (December 2008). Art by Mike Deodato Jr.

Osborn attempts to distance himself from his Green Goblin persona after being prescribed medication for his mental state. During the "Civil War" over the Superhuman Registration Act, Osborn is appointed director of the Thunderbolts superhero team, now tasked to apprehend anyone who resists registering. While in this capacity, he directs the Thunderbolts to apprehend or kill Spider-Man, but after Mephisto changes reality, Harry Osborn is alive once more, and, with the exception of Mary Jane, no one (including Norman) knows Spider-Man's secret identity. In the end, Spider-Man manages to evade this coordinated attack and escape.

During the "Secret Invasion" by shape-shifting extraterrestrials, the Skrulls, Osborn shoots and kills the Skrull queen Veranke. He leverages this widely publicized success, positioning himself as the new director of the S.H.I.E.L.D.-like paramilitary force H.A.M.M.E.R. to advance his agenda, while using his public image to start his own Dark Avengers, substituting Moonstone for Ms. Marvel, Bullseye for Hawkeye, Gargan for Spider-Man, Daken for Wolverine and Noh-Varr for Captain Marvel, as well as manipulating Ares and the Sentry into helping to further his cause. Osborn himself leads the Dark Avengers as the Iron Patriot, a suit of armor fashioned by himself after Iron Man's armor with Captain America's colors. Osborn simultaneously forms the Cabal alliance with Doctor Doom, Emma Frost, Namor, Loki and the Hood, but this 'alliance' quickly falls apart when Namor and Frost betray the Cabal to aid the X-Men. Quasimodo researches different villains for Norman Osborn to see if any of them are a threat, should be locked up, would be good use for him, or would be expendable. When researching Osborn himself, Quasimodo tells him that he looks forward to the changes that he will put through. Norman's attempts to exert his authority are increasingly jeopardized by various superheroes. After the Superhuman Registration Act records are deleted so that Osborn has no access to the information recorded about heroes after it was implemented, Osborn attacked the brain-damaged Tony Stark, thus showing Osborn brutally assaulting a physically and mentally incapable individual that was not even attempting to strike back. After the New Avengers are forced to allow Osborn to capture Cage when needing medical treatment, the team uses a tracking device Osborn had planted in Luke to trick him into blowing up his own house after rescuing Cage from Osborn's custody.

Harry is approached by Norman with the offer of a job within the Dark Avengers. Norman welcomes Harry into Avengers Tower, wanting to make his son into the American Son. When Harry finds a cure for Lily Hollister's Goblin condition for their baby's safety, Lily reveals that it is a ruse to coerce Harry into taking the American Son armor, whom Norman had plotted would die in a tragedy to increase sympathy for Norman and his Dark Avengers. When Lily also reveals that the baby is not Harry's but in fact Norman's, Harry dons his American Son armor, and fights Norman in his Iron Patriot armor. During the battle, Norman declares that Harry is no longer his son, and that he has bred a better child to replace the 'failure' of Harry. After further taunts from Norman, Harry lashes out and defeats his father, declaring "I was never your son!". When Harry has the option of killing Norman, Spider-Man says to decapitate him, since Norman's healing factor may repair a blow to the head. Spider-Man also cautions Harry that killing Norman will cause Harry to "become the son Norman always wanted". Harry instead backs down, and turns away from his father forever.

At Loki's suggestion, Osborn creates a rationale to invade Asgard, claiming the world (which was, at the time, positioned at the outskirts of Broxton, Oklahoma) poses a national security threat, by sending the U-Foes to attack Volstagg in Chicago, leading to the destruction of Soldier Field. During a pitched battle with several superheroes, Sentry causes Thor's world to fall to Earth. Osborn fights with the recently resurrected Steve Rogers, however, Stark removes Osborn's Iron Patriot armor remotely, revealing Osborn used green facepaint to create a goblin-like look. Osborn screams that the Avengers do not know what they have done, only for Spider-Man to knock him down. He tells them they are all dead as the Void is released. Osborn knocks out Rogers and tries to escape, but is captured by Volstagg. Incarcerated in the Raft penitentiary, he blames his Goblin alter-ego for ruining his chance to protect the world.

When transferred to a secret underwater government base, Osborn takes steps to ensure his release from prison. He uses a group of followers known as the "Green Goblin Cult" to break out with the aid of corrupt senators; he plans to turn himself in after killing his fellow escapees, setting him up as a 'champion' of the judicial system. After the breakout, he awaits his trial in a new prison, this one controlled by his cult members. Using his staged persona as a voice for the 'disenfranchised', Osborn plans to regain the Iron Patriot armor and creates a new team of Dark Avengers, this time substituting June Covington for Scarlet Witch, Ai Apaec for Spider-Man, Barney Barton for Hawkeye, Skaar for Hulk, Superia for Ms. Marvel, Gorgon for Wolverine and the A.I.M.-rebuilt Ragnarok for Thor. In the team's first fight with the New Avengers, Osborn reveals himself as the Super-Adaptoid, declares himself the head of world security, and orders that the Avengers be arrested for war crimes. However, double agent Skaar betrays Osborn, allowing the Avengers to dogpile Osborn's body, overloading him with superpowers and sending him into a coma. A.I.M. and Hydra pick up Osborn's leftover resources, and H.A.M.M.E.R. is disbanded. After the Hobgoblin returns to New York, a nurse and doctor are called to Norman's hospital room, only to find him gone.

=== The Goblin King ===
When the children who work for the Vulture are discussing what to do after Superior Spider-Man (Otto Octavius's mind in Spider-Man's body) brutally defeats the Vulture, the Green Goblin approaches and tells the group that he will be the one that crushes Superior Spider-Man. The Green Goblin is later shown having gathered a new gang of followers together in the sewers formed from discarded members of other villains' gangs like Vulture, Owl, and the third White Dragon's gangs. These henchmen escaped their organizations unharmed because Superior Spider-Man is more focused on the larger threats (where the original Spider-Man would focus on individuals).

As he builds this army to attack Superior Spider-Man, he takes on the new alias of the Goblin King. The Hand ninjas who evaded capture arrive at the sewers and join up with the Goblin Nation. The group reveals in the news that, thanks to Superior Spider-Man's assault, Osborn now owns over half of New York's organized crime. He claims he now owns New York City as the Goblin Kingpin of Crime. With Menace's help, Osborn later releases Phil Urich from a prison transport and upgrades Urich's Goblin armor and weapons, asking in return only that Urich's only identity from here on shall be Goblin Knight. Osborn trains Goblin Knight, anxious to confront Superior Spider-Man. Osborn later poses as the Hobgoblin and is sighted by some of the Spiderlings.

Upon Carlie Cooper being brought to his lair by Menace, he receives Carlie's journal from Menace which reveals to him that Otto's mind is in Spider-Man's body. Osborn douses Carlie with the Goblin formula, causing the woman to mutate into the new superhuman villain Monster. He demands to know Spider-Man's identity, but Monster first asks the Goblin to reveal his own identity. He assures Monster that he is Norman, but refuses to remove his Goblin mask until Carlie has proven a loyal follower and dispatches Monster and Menace on a mission. Osborn battles and kills Hobgoblin, although it is revealed to be a servant with Kingsley still in hiding abroad which Goblin Knight discovers.

Having staged a coup of New York after spreading his resources by exploiting Otto's reliance on technology, the Goblin King directly confronts Superior Spider-Man, angry that he was cheated out of the opportunity to defeat his enemy, but offering Otto the chance to join him and Otto rejects the offer. When Otto finds being unable to win against Goblin's resources, having had various allies abandoned, and with faith in his own abilities gone, Otto sacrifices himself to restore the original Spider-Man's mind in order to save Anna Maria Marconi. When Spider-Man arrives for the final confrontation, the Goblin King quickly realizes that Parker is back in control when Spider-Man responds to his nemesis' taunts with his own wisecracks. In the duel that follows, Spider-Man unmasks Osborn, learning that he has undergone plastic surgery to change his appearance, acting as Alchemax's CEO and intending to re-establish himself as businessman Mason Banks, now that his true likeness is too publicly known as a supervillain during his stint as Director of H.A.M.M.E.R. and the Iron Patriot. Spider-Man defeats and strips the villain's powers with Octavius' nanite serum, but Norman manages to escape through Liz Allan's discreet aid. In hiding once again, he reflects that the various heroes will be unprepared for him when he returns with a new identity and approach as a businessman, seemingly no longer afflicted by the bombastic mental illness associated with the Goblin Serum that he surmises wasted time on theatrics at the cost of practicality and thus less effective villainy. However, Osborn's Goblin King position is quickly usurped by Phil Urich.

During the 2015 "Secret Wars" storyline, the Kingpin hosts a viewing party for the incursion between Earth-616 and Earth-1610, with Norman Osborn among the attendees. Festivities are interrupted by the arrival of Punisher who reveals that since he cannot take them with him, he has to put his large supply of bullets somewhere; the Punisher then kills them all.

=== All New, All Different Marvel ===
A mysterious man with a bandaged face sells Goblin-based weaponry globally to attack Parker Industries. This man reveals himself to be Norman alive again post-Secret Wars (following the Fantastic Four's and Molecule Man's restoration of the Marvel Universe and going on to restore the wider Multiverse piecemeal) and still planning on getting revenge on Spider-Man and his peers/allies. He is revealed to have played a part in a recent coup in Symkaria. He restores a semblance of his original features via a twisted form of plastic surgery but which also resembles the Green Goblin's facets, and intends to release a modified version of the Goblin formula to turn the whole country into Goblin-powered soldiers programmed to be loyal to him.

In his final confrontation with Spider-Man, despite exposing his foe to a series of gases to temporarily neutralize all of his powers, and triggering an EMP to shut down all the gadgetry within his new Spider-armor, Spider-Man is still able to defeat Osborn as the two clash. Managing to escape while Peter is distracted, Osborn resolves to find a means of restoring his powers and resume his mantle of the Green Goblin, concluding that he has only ever held the edge against the webhead when allowing himself to draw on his inner demons.

=== Go Down Swinging ===
Norman Osborn as Red Goblin on the cover of The Amazing Spider-Man #799 (June 2018). Art by Alex Ross.

The apparent first step in this plan occurs with Osborn managing to steal the Carnage symbiote from an abandoned S.H.I.E.L.D. storehouse while Spider-Man is occupied with the return of Zodiac. Osborn's efforts to control the Carnage symbiote initially backfire when he merges with it and finds himself overwhelmed by the urge to kill rather than his own prior plan to direct its power against Spider-Man specifically, but he is able to convince it to let him have control in favor of trying something other than its usual mindless slaughter. As a starting favor, he has the symbiote eject the nanites in his bloodstream and re-injects himself with a vial of the Goblin Serum to combine it's augmentation with the symbiote's own wide array of abilities to ramp up his effectiveness. While interrogating a captive Jameson for information on Spider-Man, Osborn takes a brief interval from the torture to kill the self-proclaimed Goblin King who tried to raid one of his old storehouses. After Osborn appeared as the Green Goblin, Jameson mentioned how he could not stop Spider-Man since even throwing Gwen off the bridge could not break his indomitable resolve. This statement allow Norman to remember that Spider-Man's true identity as Peter Parker, which in the past had always been the edge he held against the hero, as he now knew to target his loved ones and friends. Attacking the Daily Bugle in his familiar Goblin attire, Osborn gives the rest of the staff time to evacuate as he fights Peter before revealing his new bond with Carnage, proclaiming himself to be the Red Goblin, driving Spider-Man away with 'Carnage bombs' that injure his leg. Discovering a sound-transmitting spider-tracer planted on him, Osborn uses this to deliver a 'devil's bargain' to Peter; if Peter abandons the Spider-Man identity and never performs any further heroics, Osborn will leave Parker alone, but the second he sees any sign of Spider-Man's return, he will kill everyone in Peter's life. Peter places the Spider-Man top on a flagpole so that Osborn can see it burn but privately vows that he will find a way to defeat Osborn as Peter rather than Spider-Man. Peter is able to contact various allies like Human Torch, Clash, Silk, Miles Morales, and Agent Anti-Venom to watch over his loved ones. When Norman moves against the Osborns and proves immune to Carnage's traditional weaknesses of Human Torch's fire and Clash's sound devices, Peter is forced to step back into action despite the injured leg, with Agent Anti-Venom sacrificing a chance to get back into action himself to heal Spider-Man's injury as Osborn merges a part of the Carnage symbiote with his grandson Normie turning into a miniature version of Red Goblin.

=== Absolute Carnage ===
When an undead resurrected Cletus Kasady starts hunting all former symbiote hosts to extract the samples of the symbiote codex left in them with the goal of awakening a symbiote god via the Grendel symbiote, Spider-Man and Venom attempt to retrieve Osborn from Ravencroft to test a machine that can extract the codex from former hosts, as the Maker is uncertain of potential side-effects. However, Dark Carnage attacks Ravencroft as they attempt to retrieve Osborn, transforming most of the patients into his drone soldiers and turning Osborn into another version of Carnage due to him still believing himself to be Kasady. After the Grendel symbiote leaves Osborn's body, he regains consciousness and escapes.

In the series "Ravencroft", Norman Osborn regains his sanity, blaming his actions on the Carnage symbiote to J.A.N.U.S., and becomes a consultant at Ravencroft. One of his assignments is to help John Jameson regain the ability to become Man-Wolf so that he can become an asset. In addition, Osborn steals the journal of Jonas Ravencroft to give to J.A.N.U.S. to use.

=== Sin Eater's resurrection and Last Remains ===
At the start of the "Last Remains" arc, Sin-Eater uses his gun to purge Norman of his sins. Not wanting to give him to the police, Ashley Kafka brings Norman to her office, where he confesses every bad thing that he has done in his life. Norman claims to Mary Jane that Harry is Kindred, to which Mary Jane states that she just saw Harry alive. It turns out that Norman faked being purged of his sins, as seen when he meets up with Wilson Fisk and his men. Norman and Fisk work on a plan to dispose of Kindred for what he did to them. Norman contacts Fisk stating that Mary Jane got through to Kindred. As Mary Jane offers her life in exchange for Kindred not killing the Order of the Web, Norman as the Green Goblin crashes the confrontation and attacks Mary Jane.

The "Sinister War" arc reveals that Norman was also a victim of a devil's deal with Mephisto, and his descent into villainy is caused by his past deal with the latter at the cost of the original Harry's soul. Osborn starred in the series Gold Goblin, where he becomes the eponymous hero while trying to atone for his sins.

=== Acting as Spider-Man ===
When Peter Parker is lost in space after being defeated by Hellgate, Norman Osborn operates as Spider-Man, with Ben Reilly separately impersonating Peter Parker. Norman returns the mantle to Peter after he returns from space.

== Powers and abilities ==
Norman Osborn as Green Goblin on the cover of Amazing Spider-Man #797 (March 2018). Art by Alex Ross

Norman Osborn was turned into the Green Goblin by a chemical solution he had devised based upon a formula originally conceived by Professor Mendel Stromm. The process granted Osborn superhuman strength, speed, reflexes, and stamina as well as a low-level rapid healing factor. In addition to these physical advantages, the serum also greatly enhanced Norman's already-above average intellect, making him a bona fide genius capable of making breakthroughs in advanced areas of genetics, robotics, engineering, physics and applied chemistry. The goblin formula is also said to have driven Osborn insane; defects in his personality were strongly augmented by the serum, resulting in dangerous mood-swings and hallucinations.

Following his confrontation with the returned Spider-Man after his campaign against Otto Octavius in Spider-Man's body, Osborn has been rid of the Goblin formula from his system and thus has lost his superhuman abilities, forcing him to rely on his intellect and other natural abilities. Otto's anti-serum also prevents Osborn's attempts of restoring his powers; ultimately he seeks to rid himself of it in hopes of having them again despite risking his health and sanity. Norman bonded to the Carnage symbiote to expel the anti-serum from his body, which restores his former powers at the cost of his mind. In addition, the Carnage symbiote eliminates his physical scars.

He has since claimed to have 'perfected' the formula so that it will grant the subjects powers while also reverting those he chooses to a more basic mentality where they will accept his orders.

=== Weapons of Green Goblin ===
The Green Goblin is armed with a variety of devices. He wears a green costume underneath bulletproof chainmail with an overlapping purple tunic. His mask has a built-in gas filter to keep him safe from his own gasses. The Green Goblin's trademark weapons are his pumpkin bombs and razor bats. As their name suggests, the bombs were designed with the appearance of jack-o'-lanterns. These varied in function from smoke bombs to traditional explosives, while the razor edged bat-shaped boomerangs-could cut through very durable surfaces and materials. The gloves of the Goblin uniform were fashioned with minuscule conductors that allowed for the release of electricity at nearly 10,000 amps of an undetermined voltage. Originally, Osborn used a mechanical broomstick to fly through the air during his first few exploits as the Green Goblin. The Flying Broomstick did not last long, however, and was improved upon, creating the Goblin Glider. The Goblin Glider was a more efficient flight system than Norman's Flying Broomstick. The Glider allowed the Goblin to carry a wide array of armaments, including heat-seeking and smart missiles, machine guns, extending blades, a flamethrower and a pumpkin bomb dispenser/launcher with him as he flew and had much greater speed and mobility than the Broomstick.

=== Weapons as Iron Patriot ===
During the events of the "Dark Reign" storyline, Osborn created the Iron Patriot identity (an amalgam of Iron Man and Captain America) to cement his standing as a hero. As the Iron Patriot, he utilized an outdated version of Iron Man's armor painted in Captain America's colors. The armor featured superhuman strength, enhanced durability, flight, magnetic impact blasts, heat seeking missiles, miniaturized lasers, flamethrowers, and a communications system housed in his helmet which allowed him to interface with any U.S.-controlled satellite or computer network. While Iron Man's armor utilized repulsor technology, Osborn's design does not; all but one repulsor was destroyed as "Oz is too stupid" to make his own repulsor-based weapons system. Osborn's star shaped Uni Beam projector on his chest (because of its shape) also has a less powerful output.

=== Powers as Super-Adaptoid ===
Following his time in prison, A.I.M scientists converted Osborn into a Super-Adaptoid, capable of absorbing the abilities of any mutant, mutate, alien, android or other such superpowered being by touching them. In this form he possessed considerably increased strength and durability; where he was once approximately as strong as Spider-Man, he now possessed sufficient strength to overpower and throw Luke Cage a significant distance away from him. He could also levitate, and he was able to defeat the Vision in an aerial conflict between the two.

He is known to have absorbed the abilities of Luke Cage, Vision, Red Hulk and Protector, and it is suggested that he also absorbed the abilities of his current Dark Avengers. In his final form, his body grew to the Hulk's size, and like Hulk he was capable of creating shockwaves by hitting the ground or smashing his hands together. His durability was sufficient to withstand the combined attacks of all the Avengers, and he demonstrated remarkable healing abilities, recovering in seconds after Daisy Johnson used her powers to make his heart explode. He could also turn intangible by manipulating his density, as the Vision does.

However, Osborn had no control over his Super-Adaptoid abilities; he would automatically absorb the powers of any superhuman he touched, even if he did not consciously want to. He was also limited in how many powers his body could hold, as the A.I.M. scientists warned him that absorbing too many powers at once could overload his systems. In the end, he inadvertently absorbed the abilities of all the Avengers and New Avengers when they all touched him at once, and the unstable combination of their multiple different powers caused significant damage to his body chemistry, resulting in him going into a coma. After he regained consciousness, these powers were apparently burnt out, returning him to his Goblin-level strength instead.

=== Powers as Red Goblin ===
After gaining control of the Carnage symbiote's desire for mindless slaughter, Osborn has used it to form a new attire in the form of the Red Goblin, which essentially resembles a red version of his Green Goblin outfit without the purple and green clothing, as well as a long tail and flaming breath. With the symbiote, he can create his own Goblin Glider and what he terms 'Carnage bombs', which are essentially pumpkin bombs that can actually talk to and bite their targets before exploding, as well as the Carnage symbiote's traditional enhancements. Due to the combination of the symbiote with the new Goblin formula injected into his system, Osborn is immune to the symbiote's traditional weaknesses of fire and sound, although the touch of Anti-Venom is still dangerous to him. He also revived its ability to spread its constituent matter to others.

== Characterization ==
Norman Osborn has consistently been depicted with several unusual weaknesses related to his psychosis and to his personality. He has manic depression, has a pronounced narcissistic personality disorder co-morbid with severe anti-social psychopathic traits, and in some depictions, a form of dissociative identity disorder (DID). For some of his early appearances, he and the Goblin were separate personalities; his Goblin side disdaining his human weaknesses, while his Norman Osborn persona was primarily motivated by his concern for Harry. Later depictions, if they were mentioned, portrayed both alters as equally deplorable villains. Although the stress caused by his son's failing health as Norman helped to provoke his transformation back into the Goblin, this supposedly separate and more compassionate side of him never reappeared after he was believed dead. Norman is also highly sadistic, showing a complete lack of empathy for the lives of innocent people who stand between him and his objectives. These weaknesses have often been referenced in stories featuring him and exploited by his enemies.

Norman Osborn is shown to be severely manic depressive. This has been referenced several times in a myriad of Spider-Man stories. When he is not under the direction of a psychiatrist and taking medication, he has dangerous mood swings. At the apex of his mania, he is paranoid, delusional, and experiences visual and auditory hallucinations, including hearing the voice of his Green Goblin persona and seeing its face in the mirror rather than his own. Previously, Osborn's arrogance caused him to refuse to submit to psychiatric treatment unless forced to; he viewed mental illness as an imperfection and therefore would not admit that he is mentally ill. In later conversations with the Sentry, Osborn revealed that he had come to accept his own mental illness. After having rid of his powers after the confrontation with the Superior Spider-Man (Doctor Octopus), Osborn's sanity apparently restored but remains a villain.

Superhuman psychiatrist Leonard Samson says of Osborn: "In clinical terms, the words psychotic and psychopathic are far from synonymous... but in Norman Osborn's case, both apply. I'd characterise him as a bipolar psychotic with concurrent aspects of psychopathic megalomania and malignant narcissism. In layman's terms, a lethal cocktail of intersecting personality disorders that makes him one of the most dangerous human beings on the planet". There are many examples of Osborn's pronounced superiority complex, to the point that he will rarely, if ever, admit that he has made mistakes. He often transfers blame for his shortcomings to others or claims that he was better than he was; even before his accident, he spent more time providing Harry with gifts or outings rather than actually being there for his son or trying to listen to his problems, and nevertheless claims that he was still a good father, likely due to the abusive nature of his own father.

Having become the Goblin, he generally views other people as dim-witted pests, lacking in creative vision, unworthy to be graced by his presence. He goes out of his way to remind others of their personal failures and shortcomings and to remind those in close relationships with him, such as his son, that they are incapable of measuring up to his achievements. When he first learned Spider-Man's identity, he claimed that, when Spider-Man had defeated him in their previous battles, none of those victories counted because Spider-Man had only beaten his lackeys, or been rescued by the intervention of other super powered beings such as the Human Torch, despite the fact that he always departed the battles after Spider-Man's victories rather than trying to defeat his foe himself.

He also missed the opportunity to lead the original Sinister Six because he felt that joining the group would mean admitting he needed the help of others to rid himself of Spider-Man. Although he later formed the 'Sinister Twelve' when Spider-Man sent him to prison, he expressed anger at Mac Gargan for acquiring the Venom symbiote rather than using the new Scorpion suit provided for him simply because Gargan was not doing what he wanted, despite Venom being more powerful than the Scorpion. When he participated in the mystical ritual known as the Gathering of Five, he appeared convinced that he would automatically receive the gift of power from the ritual – which would bestow upon the participants power, immortality, knowledge, madness and death, respectively – only to receive the gift of madness instead, subsequently requiring an elaborate cocktail of drugs to restore himself to a semblance of sanity. During his time in charge of H.A.M.M.E.R. he was provoked into attacking Asgard by his Goblin side because his ego could not allow himself to consider the possibility that the Asgardians would not threaten his power. Later events revealed that Loki at least slightly influenced Osborn's decision to further Loki's own goals. During his attempted takeover of Earth's superhuman security defenses, he was shown reflecting that humans are all barbarians who require the strong like him to control them, dismissing the Avengers as no better than him despite the obvious distinction between Osborn's demands for power and the straightforward respect that the general public have for the Avengers.

It has been shown that since having suppressed the rampaging Green Goblin personality and becoming the more dominant personality, Osborn has proven to be just as evil and cruel. Osborn has demonstrated a high degree of sadism: while in prison, a guard once asked him for his advice in helping his critically ill wife; Osborn's advice led her to a quicker and more agonizing death. As director of H.A.M.M.E.R., he directed his officers to shoot down an airplane full of innocent people just to see whether his enemy Pepper Potts was powerful enough to rescue the passengers with her Rescue armor. His Goblin persona vied for control of his body, as depicted in the January 2010 issue of Dark Avengers, where he is shown writhing on the floor and imploring, apparently to himself, "Why won't this face come off...?", and finally took over when Osborn's Iron Patriot armor was defeated by Captain America and Iron Man at the end of the "Siege" arc. Since being cured of the Goblin formula, Osborn claims that his sanity has also been restored. However, he has expressed satisfaction at plastic surgery that 'restored' him to a twisted version of his original features, and intended to use a modified version of the formula to essentially 'infect' the entire country of Symkaria to become goblin-level soldiers without the intellectual capacity to defy him.

== Alternate versions ==
A number of alternate universe versions of Norman Osborn have appeared throughout the character's publication history.

=== Age of Apocalypse ===
In Age of Apocalypse, Norman Osborn, known as "Red", is a member of Apocalypse's Marauders along with Dirigible, Owl, and Arcade.

=== Amalgam Comics ===
In the Amalgam Comics universe, Harvey Osborn is a composite character with elements of DC Comics character Two-Face (Harvey Dent).

=== Earth X ===
In Earth X, Osborn is the prime economic power and de facto ruler of the United States.

=== Earth-66 ===
On Earth-66, Osborn is a Tyrannosaurus called Norannosaurus who swapped bodies with Pter, a Pteranodon, after they were both exposed to a meteor containing spider-like aliens.

=== Ghost Goblin ===
An unidentified version of Norman Osborn operates as the Ghost Goblin. He is a member of the Masters of Evil, possesses powers similar to Ghost Rider, and throws flaming noggin bombs that are in the shape of a skull. Ghost Goblin fights against Nighthawk and the Prehistoric Ghost Rider. During the fight, Ghost Goblin is depowered by the Prehistoric Ghost Rider, who kills him.

=== Heroes Reborn (2021) ===
In an alternate reality depicted in the 2021 "Heroes Reborn" miniseries, Norman Osborn operates as the Goblin, has Deadpool as a sidekick, and serves as Nighthawk's arch-nemesis.

=== Infinity Wars ===
In the Infinity Wars storyline, Goblin by Night is a composite character with elements of Werewolf by Night.

=== Marvel 1602 ===
In Marvel 1602, Norman Osborne appears as a major villain, attempting to find the Source, which is guarded by the natives of Roanoke Island. Osborn is later gravely wounded in a cannon attack, with Henri Le Pym mutating him into a winged, green-skinned creature to save his life.

=== Marvel 2099 ===
In the unified Marvel 2099 reality of Earth-2099, Norman Osborn kept himself alive by using the Goblin Formula and the bodies of his descendants. While having created the Black Cards needed to avoid arrest, Norman Osborn operated as Patriot of the 2099 version of the Masters of Evil where they slaughtered the 2099 version of the Avengers. He later left the group and formed the Cabal.

As the Galactic Goblin, Norman Osborn fought Spider-Man 2099, Valkyrie 2099, and X-Men 2099 at the sight of the Celestial Guard. After Spider-Man 2099 defeated Galactic Goblin, his Black Cards were destroyed by Nostromos and Ghost Rider destroyed Galactic Goblin's cards as the authorities finally arrest Galactic Goblin.

=== Marvel Noir ===
In the Marvel Noir universe, Osborn is a former circus freak who was mistreated by the audience due to having reptile-like skin.

=== Spider-Geddon ===
Several alternate versions of Norman Osborn appear in the "Spider-Geddon" storyline:

- Norman Osborn of Earth-44145 is a six-armed version of Spider-Man. Osborn is among the spider-powered characters who are recruited into Superior Spider-Man's team.
- During the return of the Inheritors, Spider-Gwen's device to travel through the multiverse got destroyed by Verna and then Spider-Gwen got stranded in an alternate universe. In this universe, Peter Parker and Gwen Stacy got a job at Oscorp and Peter wanted to create a cure for severe illness. Peter was experimenting with spider venom to create the cure but one of the spiders bit Harry Osborn instead, and thus is this universe's Spider-Man. Harry alongside Gwen as this universe's Green Goblin started to fight crime together, until during a fight with Sandman, both Harry and Gwen's father got killed. After that, Gwen lost all of memories, forgetting about Peter and Mary Jane.
- On Earth-11580, another version of Green Goblin is seen alongside Hobgoblin, Demogoblin and Jack O'Lantern during the Goblin Night. Under the Goblin Queen's orders, they try to kill Gwen Stacy, but Spiders-Man arrives and defeats the Goblins.

=== Spider-Man: Clone Saga ===
In the retelling of the Clone Saga by Tom DeFalco, Osborn did not survive his battle with Spider-Man following the death of Gwen Stacy.

=== Spider-Man: Life Story ===
In Spider-Man: Life Story, a timeline that has the characters age naturally rather than adhering to a floating timeline, Osborn is eventually released from prison and feigns his old age affecting his mental state before disappearing from the public. After learning of Harry Osborn's death from Peter, Osborn blames Peter for the incident and tries to attack him, but then dies of a heart attack cursing Spider-Man.

== Cultural impact and legacy ==
=== Popularity and critical response ===
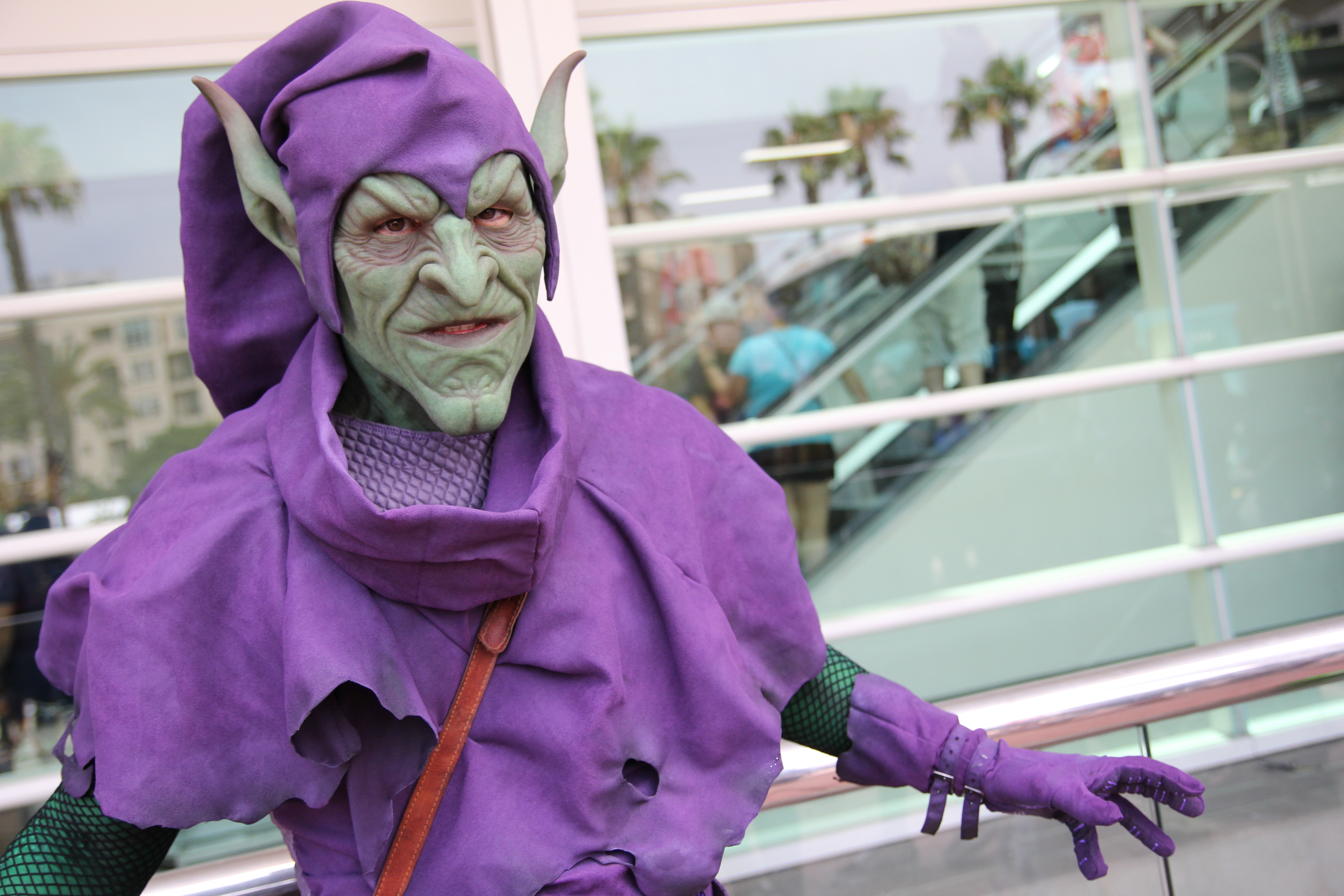
A fan dressed in Green Goblin cosplay.

Comics journalist and historian Mike Conroy writes of the character: "Of all the costumed villains who've plagued Spider-Man over the years, the most flat-out unhinged and terrifying of them all is the Green Goblin."

IGN ranked Norman as the thirteenth greatest comic book villain of all time being the seventh highest Marvel Comics supervillain on the list. They referenced storylines such as "The Night Gwen Stacy Died" and "Dark Reign" saga as one of his most prominent roles. While an ongoing comic book storyline during the time of the list, they praised his depiction in the "Dark Reign" saga stating that while he was once a great villain in his Green Goblin persona, he evolved past that when briefly being successful taking over S.H.I.E.L.D. and the Avengers on his own without the Green Goblin persona. IGN then ranked Osborn as the 13th greatest Marvel Comics supervillain in 2014. Stating that "no villain has taken so much from Peter Parker or left such a lasting impact on his life". IGN also ranked him as twenty fourth on their top 100 villains list in 2016 being the third highest Marvel Comics supervillain on the list after Magneto and Doctor Doom and the fifth highest comic book supervillain with DC Comics supervillains Joker and Lex Luthor being the only other higher ranked. IGN ranked him as the second greatest Spider-Man villain in 2014 only behind Doctor Octopus. His rivalry with Spider-Man is listed as the second greatest archenemies in comics.

Wizard magazine also ranked Norman's Green Goblin persona as the nineteenth greatest villain of all time with Galactus, Magneto and Doctor Doom being the only Marvel Comics characters higher on the list. They also placed him twenty eighth on the greatest comic book character list being the fifth highest supervillain only lower than Doctor Doom, Magneto, Joker and Luthor. Newsarama placed the Green Goblin as the second greatest Spider-Man villain of all time in 2017 behind Doctor Octopus. CollegeHumor ranked him as the fourteenth greatest comic book villain of all time. Complex ranked him as seventh in the 100 greatest comic book villains of all time. WhatCulture named him as the seventeenth greatest comic book villains of all time. Screen Rant named him as the second best Spider-Man villain of all time. Comicbook.com placed the character debut in the third place as the best Spider-Man villain. GamesRadar ranked him as the third in the top 50 greatest Spider-Man villains. ComicsAlliance ranked him as the number one greatest Spider-Man villain.

In 2020, CBR.com included Red Goblin in their "Spider-Man: The Best New Villains of the Century" list.

In 2020, CBR.com ranked Norman Osborn 1st in their "Marvel: Dark Spider-Man Villains, Ranked From Lamest To Coolest" list.

In 2022, Screen Rant ranked Red Goblin in their "10 Most Powerful Silk Villains In Marvel Comics" list.

In 2022, Screen Rant ranked Green Goblin 3rd in their "10 Most Powerful Silk Villains In Marvel Comics" list.

In 2022, CBR.com ranked Green Goblin 2nd in their "10 Most Violent Spider-Man Villains" list.

== In other media ==
Norman Osborn in film
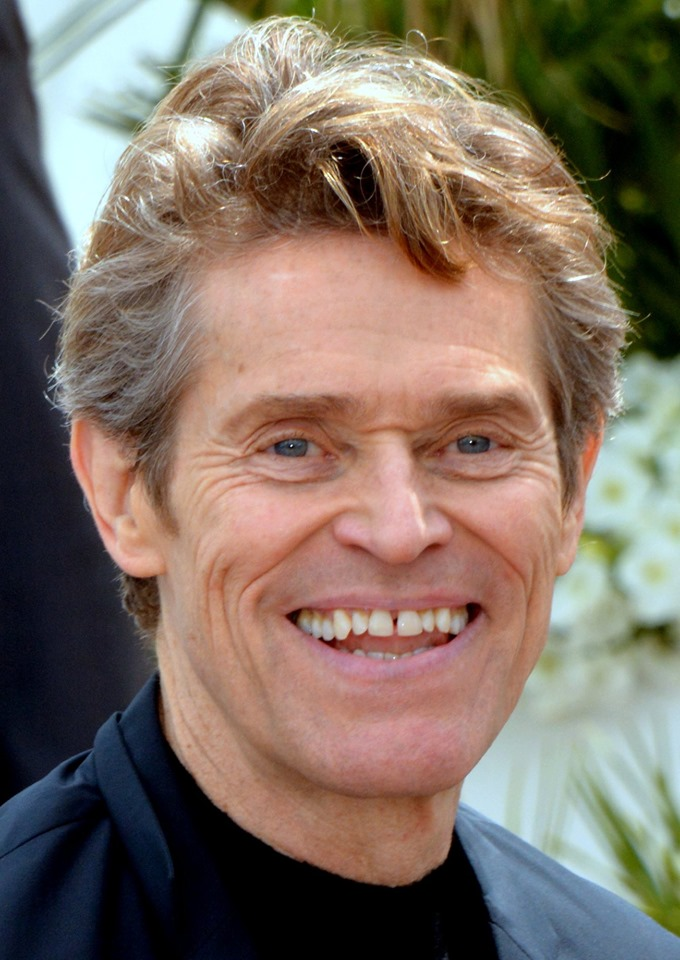
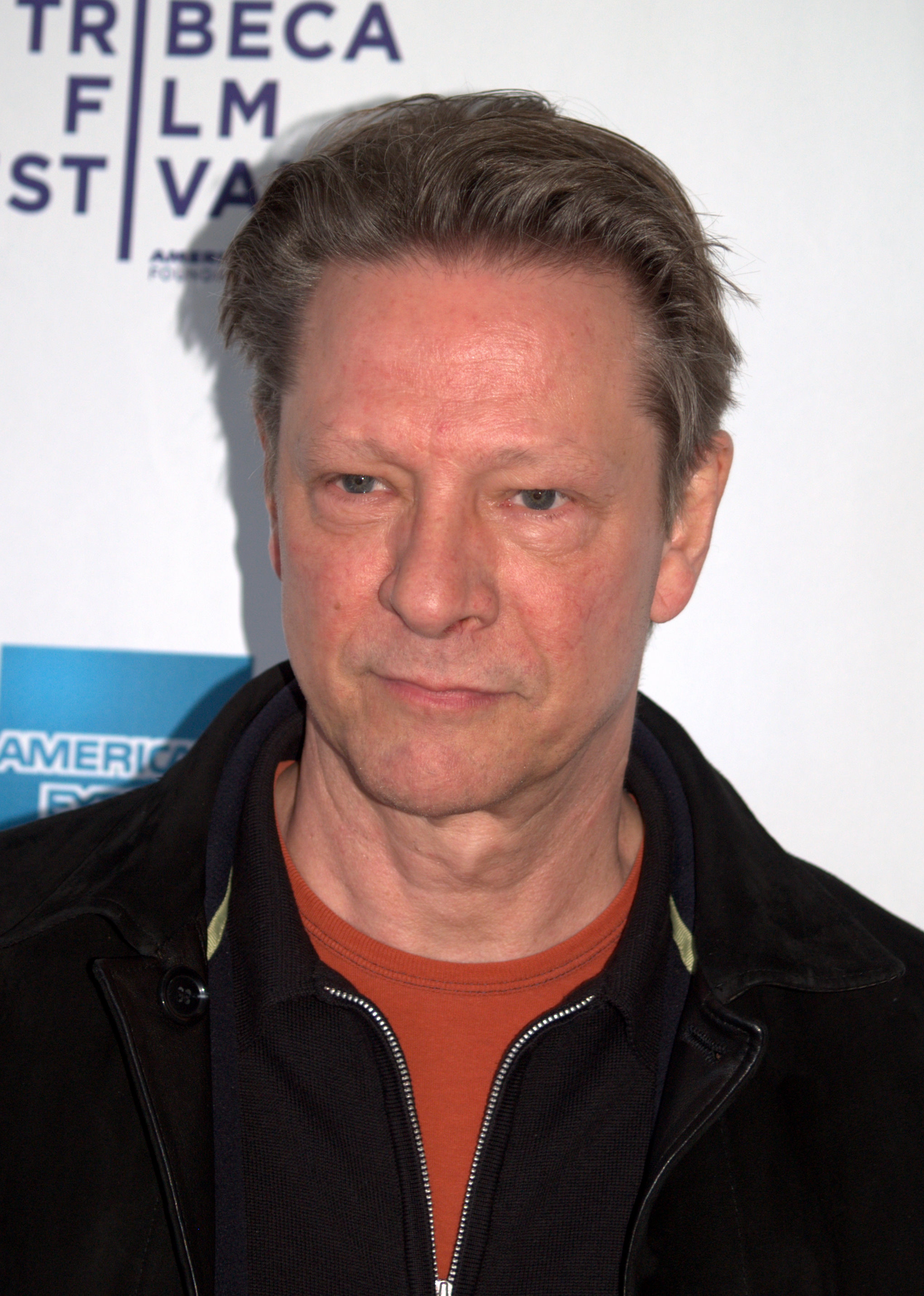
Willem Dafoe (left) and Chris Cooper (right) have portrayed Norman Osborn in film.

Norman Osborn has appeared in comics, cartoons, films, video games, coloring books, novels, records, and children's books. Osborn also appeared in other print forms besides the comics, including novels, children's books, and the daily newspaper comic strip The Amazing Spider-Man, which debuted in January 1977, with the earliest installments written by Stan Lee and drawn by John Romita, Sr. Osborn has been adapted to other media including games, toys, collectibles, and miscellaneous memorabilia, and has appeared as the main character in numerous computer and video games on over 15 gaming platforms.

In television, he first was featured in the ABC animated series Spider-Man (1967–1970) and later on other animated series featuring the superhero include the syndicated Spider-Man (1981–1982), Spider-Man and His Amazing Friends (1981–1983), Fox Kids' Spider-Man: The Animated Series (1994–1998), Spider-Man Unlimited (1999–2000), Spider-Man: The New Animated Series (2003), The Spectacular Spider-Man (2008–2009), Ultimate Spider-Man (2012–2017), Marvel Disk Wars: The Avengers (2014–2015), Spider-Man (2017–2020), and Your Friendly Neighborhood Spider-Man (2025–present), which is part of the Marvel Cinematic Universe (MCU) franchise.

Norman was featured in a trilogy of live-action films directed by Sam Raimi and played by Willem Dafoe. He was the main antagonist in the first film (2002), and later made cameo appearances in Spider-Man 2 (2004) and Spider-Man 3 (2007) as a hallucination. Marc Webb's The Amazing Spider-Man film reboot (2012) featured many references to the character who appeared in the sequel The Amazing Spider-Man 2 (2014) portrayed by Chris Cooper. Dafoe reprised the role, again as the main antagonist, in the Marvel Cinematic Universe film Spider-Man: No Way Home (2021).

Osborn was one of the characters portrayed in the 1987 live adaptation of Spider-Man's wedding at Shea Stadium. Osborn appeared as the main antagonist in the Broadway musical Spider-Man: Turn Off the Dark, began previews on November 14, 2010, at the Foxwoods Theatre on Broadway, with the official opening night on June 14, 2011. He also appears in the 2014 Marvel Universe Live! stage show.

== Collected editions ==
Title	Material collected	Date published	ISBN
Spider-Man: Revenge of the Green Goblin	Spider-Man: Revenge of the Green Goblin #1–3 and Amazing Spider-Man (vol. 2) #20–29, Annual 2001; Peter Parker: Spider-Man #25, 29	September 12, 2017	978-1-302-90700-6
Osborn: Evil Incarcerated	Osborn #1–5	June 15, 2011	978-0-785-15175-3
The Amazing Spider-Man By Nick Spencer Vol. 6: Absolute Carnage	Red Goblin: Red Death and Amazing Spider-Man (vol. 5) #29–31	January 30, 2020	978-1-302-91727-2
Gold Goblin	Gold Goblin #1–5	June 20, 2023	978-1-302-94798-9
